= List of Egyptian Athletics Championships winners =

The Egyptian Athletics Championships is an annual track and field competition which serves as the national championship for Egypt. It is organised by the Egyptian Athletic Federation, Egypt's national governing body for the sport of athletics. The winner of each event at the championships is declared the national champion for that year.

== Men ==
=== 100 metres ===
- 1981: Atef Sayed Awad
- 1982: Mohamed Anwar Mohamed
- 1983: Mohamed Anwar Mohamed
- 1984: Mohamed Anwar Mohamed
- 1985: Mohamed Anwar Mohamed
- 1986: El Samnudi Isama Athman
- 1987: Ossama Mohamed Hassan
- 1988: Ossama Mohamed Hassan
- 1989: Mohamed Shaban Farag
- 1990: Youssef Ahmed Youssef
- 1991: Ahmed Ouda Yad
- 1992: Youssef Ahmed Youssef
- 1993: Ahmed Ouda Yad
- 1994: Ahmed Ouda Yad
- 1995: Ahmed Ouda Yad
- 1996: Rida Mohamed Abdel Hamid
- 1997: Ahmed Ouda Yad
- 1998: Ahmed Ouda Yad
- 1999: Rida Mohamed Abdel Hamid
- 2000: Ahmed Nasr Ahmed
- 2001: Ahmed Nasr Ahmed
- 2002: Ahmed Nasr Ahmed
- 2003: Ahmed Nasr Ahmed
- 2004: Ahmed Nasr Ahmed
- 2005: Salem Eid Suleiman

=== 200 metres ===
- 1981: Adel Fathi Hassan
- 1982: Wahid Salah
- 1983: Nafi Ahmed Mersal
- 1984: Alaa Touni
- 1985: Bakr Abdel Magid Aziz
- 1986: Mohamed Shaban Farag
- 1987: Ossama Mohamed Hassan
- 1988: Rafik Abdel Aziz Jaballah
- 1989: Ahmed Abdel Halim Ghanem
- 1990: Ahmed Ouda Yad
- 1991: Ahmed Ouda Yad
- 1992: Ahmed Ouda Yad
- 1993: Ahmed Ouda Yad
- 1994: Ahmed Ouda Yad
- 1995: Ahmed Ouda Yad
- 1996: Rida Mohamed Abdel Hamid
- 1997: Ahmed Ouda Yad
- 1998: Amin Gomaa Badawi
- 1999: Amin Gomaa Badawi
- 2000: Amin Gomaa Badawi
- 2001: Amin Gomaa Badawi
- 2002: Amin Gomaa Badawi
- 2003: Salem Eid Suleiman
- 2004: Mustafa Amr Ibrahim
- 2005: Salem Solim Awad

=== 400 metres ===
- 1981: Abderrahman Khedir
- 1982: Nafi Ahmed Mersal
- 1983: Nafi Ahmed Mersal
- 1984: Rafik Abdel Aziz Rahab
- 1985: Ahmed Abdel Halim Ghanem
- 1986: Ahmed Abdel Halim Ghanem
- 1987: Rafik Abdel Aziz Jaballah
- 1988: Rafik Abdel Aziz Jaballah
- 1989: Ahmed Abdel Halim Ghanem
- 1990: Ahmed Abdel Halim Ghanem
- 1991: Ahmed Abdel Halim Ghanem
- 1992: Ahmed Ouda Yad
- 1993: Tarek Ibrahim Tabana
- 1994: El Hafni Abdel Maksoud Ibrahim
- 1995: Sayed Awad Suleiman
- 1996: Sayed Awad Suleiman
- 1997: Atef Abdel Hadi Mohamed
- 1998: Amin Gomaa Badawi
- 1999: Amin Gomaa Badawi
- 2000: Amin Gomaa Badawi
- 2001: Amin Gomaa Badawi
- 2002: Amin Gomaa Badawi
- 2003: Amin Gomaa Badawi
- 2004: Amin Gomaa Badawi
- 2005: Amin Gomaa Badawi

=== 800 metres ===
- 1981: Abderrahman Khedir
- 1982: El Sayed Raslan
- 1983: Amgad Labib El Rashidi
- 1984: Hamdi Kamel Ahmed
- 1985: Hamdi Kamel Ahmed
- 1986: Omar Ibrahim Mohamed
- 1987: Omar Ibrahim Mohamed
- 1988: Omar Ibrahim Mohamed
- 1989: Omar Ibrahim Mohamed
- 1990: Omar Ibrahim Mohamed
- 1991: Mohamed Mohamed Hussein
- 1992: Mohamed Mohamed Hussein
- 1993: Omar Ibrahim Mohamed
- 1994: Sayed Awad Suleiman
- 1995: Sayed Awad Suleiman
- 1996: Sayed Awad Suleiman
- 1997: Sayed Awad Suleiman
- 1998: Mustafa Fawzi Shalabi
- 1999: Atef Abdel Hadi Mohamed
- 2000: Sayed Ahmed Sliman
- 2001: Atef Abdel Hadi Mohamed
- 2002: Samir Saad El Sayed El Dessouki
- 2003: Samir Saad El Sayed El Dessouki
- 2004: Amin Gomaa Badawi
- 2005: Abdallah Kader Mohamed

=== 1500 metres ===
- 1981: Adel Abdallah Mahmoud
- 1982: Hamdi Kamel Ahmed
- 1983: ?
- 1984: Hamdi Kamel Ahmed
- 1985: Hamdi Kamel Ahmed
- 1986: Hamdi Kamel Ahmed
- 1987: Omar Ibrahim Mohamed
- 1988: Hamdi Kamel Ahmed
- 1989: Omar Ibrahim Mohamed
- 1990: Hamdi Kamel Ahmed
- 1991: Hamdi Kamel Ahmed
- 1992: Hamdi Kamel Ahmed
- 1993: Hamdi Kamel Ahmed
- 1994: Hamdi Kamel Ahmed
- 1995: Ahmed Mohamed Ibrahim El Jundi
- 1996: Ahmed Mohamed Ibrahim El Jundi
- 1997: Mustafa Fawzi Shalabi
- 1998: Mustafa Fawzi Shalabi
- 1999: Mustafa Fawzi Shalabi
- 2000: Mustafa Fawzi Shalabi
- 2001: Ragab Mohamed Ahmed
- 2002: Ragab Mohamed Ahmed
- 2003: Farid Samir Abdallah
- 2004: Ahmed Sabah Frej
- 2005: Abdallah Kader Mohamed

=== 5000 metres ===
- 1981: Mohamed Abdel Aziz Koreish
- 1982: Waguih Hafez
- 1983: ?
- 1984: Mohamed Idris Ibrahim
- 1985: Mohamed Idris Ahmed
- 1986: Mohamed Idris Ibrahim
- 1987: Ahmed Abdel Malek Abdel Hamid
- 1988: Mohamed Idris Ibrahim
- 1989: Mohsen Mohamed Sayed
- 1990: Ahmed Ali Ellithi
- 1991: Ahmed Ali Ellithi
- 1992: Hamdi Kamel Ahmed
- 1993: Hamdi Kamel Ahmed
- 1994: El Fouli Mustafa Salem
- 1995: El Fouli Mustafa Salem
- 1996: El Fouli Mustafa Salem
- 1997: El Fouli Mustafa Salem
- 1998: Ahmed Abdel Magoud Ahmed
- 1999: Ahmed Abdel Magoud Ahmed
- 2000: Abd El Rasoul El Badri Ahmed
- 2001: Ahmed Abdel Magoud Ahmed
- 2002: Ahmed Abdel Magoud Ahmed
- 2003: Ahmed Abdel Magoud Ahmed
- 2004: Hassan Saber Ahmed
- 2005: Hamzi Mohamed Hamed

=== 10,000 metres ===
- 1981: Mohieddin Mahmoud
- 1982: Waguih Hafez
- 1983: ?
- 1984: Mohamed Idris Ibrahim
- 1985: Mohamed Idris Ahmed
- 1986: Mohamed Idris Ibrahim
- 1987: Mohamed Idris Ibrahim
- 1988: Mohamed Idris Ibrahim
- 1989: Ahmed Ali Ellithi
- 1990: Ahmed Ali Ellithi
- 1991: Mohamed Amin Taha
- 1992: Yasser Daoud Ali
- 1993: Ahmed Ali Ellithi
- 1994: El Fouli Mustafa Salem
- 1995: Issa Rizk Abu Eddaief
- 1996: El Fouli Mustafa Salem
- 1997: El Fouli Mustafa Salem
- 1998: Ahmed Abdel Magoud Ahmed
- 1999: Wael Adam
- 2000: Ahmed Abdel Magoud Ahmed
- 2001: El Fouli Mustafa Salem
- 2002: El Fouli Mustafa Salem
- 2003: Abd El Rasoul El Badri Ahmed
- 2004: El Fouli Mustafa Salem
- 2005: Hamzi Mohamed Hamed

=== Half marathon ===
- 1996: Mahmoud Mohd Ahmed El Bahawi

=== Marathon ===
- 1993: Es Sayed El Haddad Essman
- 1994: ?
- 1995: Ali Abdel Motaleb Slim
- 1996: El Fouli Mustafa Salem

=== 3000 metres steeplechase ===
- 1986: Ahmed Abdel Malek Abdel Hamid
- 1987: Mohamed Idris Ibrahim
- 1988: Mohamed Idris Ibrahim
- 1989: Mohsen Mohamed Sayed
- 1990: Rida Ahmed Abdel Hadi
- 1991: Mohamed Abu Bakr Heremas
- 1992: Magdi Gherib Suleiman
- 1993: Magdi Gherib Suleiman
- 1994: Ahmed Ali Ellithi
- 1995: Iman Anwar Mohamed
- 1996: Iman Anwar Mohamed
- 1997: Magdi Gherib Suleiman
- 1998: Abd El Rasoul El Badri Ahmed
- 1999: Abd El Rasoul El Badri Ahmed
- 2000: Abd El Rasoul El Badri Ahmed
- 2001: Tamer Eid Ayad
- 2002: Abd El Rasoul El Badri Ahmed
- 2003: Awda Sadok Abdallah
- 2004: Awda Sadok Abdallah
- 2005: Abd El Rasoul El Badri Ahmed

=== 110 metres hurdles ===
- 1981: Shaban Ahmed Mahmoud
- 1982: Hisham Mohamed Makin
- 1983: Shaban Ahmed Mahmoud
- 1984: Shaban Ahmed Mahmoud
- 1985: Shaban Ahmed Mahmoud
- 1986: Hisham Mohamed Makin
- 1987: Shaban Ahmed Mahmoud
- 1988: Shaban Ahmed Mahmoud
- 1989: Shaban Ahmed Mahmoud
- 1990: Ismail Ahmed Mahmoud
- 1991: Mohamed Sami Mohamed
- 1992: Mohamed Sami Mohamed
- 1993: Mohamed Sami Mohamed
- 1994: Mohamed Sami Mohamed
- 1995: Mohamed Sami Mohamed
- 1996: Mohamed Sami Mohamed
- 1997: Mohamed Sami Mohamed
- 1998: Mohamed Sami Mohamed
- 1999: Mohamed Sami Mohamed
- 2000: Nader Hosni Saad
- 2001: Mohamed Sami Mohamed
- 2002: Mohamed Gomaa Mohamed
- 2003: Nader Hosni Saad
- 2004: Abdel Aziz Mohamed Mahmoud
- 2005: Mohamed Gomaa Mohamed

=== 400 metres hurdles ===
- 1981: Ahmed Abdel Halim Ghanem
- 1982: Ahmed Abdel Halim Ghanem
- 1983: Ahmed Abdel Halim Ghanem
- 1984: Ahmed Abdel Halim Ghanem
- 1985: Ahmed Abdel Halim Ghanem
- 1986: Ahmed Abdel Halim Ghanem
- 1987: Tarek Ibrahim Tabana
- 1988: Ahmed Abdel Halim Ghanem
- 1989: Ahmed Abdel Halim Ghanem
- 1990: Ahmed Abdel Halim Ghanem
- 1991: Ahmed Abdel Halim Ghanem
- 1992: Tarek Ibrahim Tabana
- 1993: Mohamed Ismaat Abdel Ghani
- 1994: El Hafni Abdel Maksoud Ibrahim
- 1995: El Hafni Abdel Maksoud Ibrahim
- 1996: El Hafni Abdel Maksoud Ibrahim
- 1997: El Hafni Abdel Maksoud Ibrahim
- 1998: El Hafni Abdel Maksoud Ibrahim
- 1999: El Hafni Abdel Maksoud Ibrahim
- 2000: El Hafni Abdel Maksoud Ibrahim
- 2001: Ismail Hashem Ismail
- 2002: Hissam Ahmed Messaoud
- 2003: Magid Mohamed Mansour
- 2004: Magid Mohamed Mansour
- 2005: Hithem Mohamed Ahmed Mahmoud

=== High jump ===
- 1981: Seddik Ahmed Ibrahim (SUD)
- 1982: Ahmed Mohamed Fahmi
- 1983: Ahmed Mohamed Fahmi
- 1984: Ahmed Mohamed Fahmi
- 1985: Hisham Sayed Youssef
- 1986: Hisham Sayed Youssef
- 1987: Mahmoud Hisham Salem Nejim
- 1988: Awail Ahmed Abu Ejla
- 1989: Awail Ahmed Abu Ejla
- 1990: Awail Ahmed Abu Ejla
- 1991: Mohieddin Adel Abdel Moez
- 1992: Mohieddin Adel Abdel Moez
- 1993: Mohieddin Adel Abdel Moez
- 1994: Mohieddin Adel Abdel Moez
- 1995: Khaled Mohieddin Abdel Mohsen
- 1996: Mustafa Mustafa Ali
- 1997: Khaled Mohieddin Abdel Mohsen
- 1998: Khaled Mohieddin Abdel Mohsen
- 1999: Hassan Darwish Mahmoud
- 2000: Hassan Darwish Mahmoud
- 2001: Mustafa Abdel Jalil Hassanine
- 2002: Moshe Adel Abu Maati
- 2003: Nader Mahmoud Mohamed
- 2004: Ahmed Farouk Abdel Zaher
- 2005: Karim Samir Lotfy

=== Pole vault ===
- 1981: Hisham Ismail Ali
- 1982: Walid Riad Hussein
- 1983: Issam Fathi Hassan
- 1984: Walid Riad Hussein
- 1985: Walid Riad Hussein
- 1986: Walid Riad Hussein
- 1987: Issam Fathi Hassan
- 1988: Issam Fathi Hassan
- 1989: Sameh Hassan Farid
- 1990: Issam Fathi Hassan
- 1991: Khaled Ibrahim Ali
- 1992: Sameh Hassan Farid
- 1993: Ahmed Hosni Abu Zid
- 1994: Sameh Hassan Farid
- 1995: Sameh Hassan Farid
- 1996: Sameh Hassan Farid
- 1997: Ahmed Hosni Abu Zid
- 1998: Amru Massoud Sayed
- 1999: Amru Massoud Sayed
- 2000: Medhat Salem Abul Salem
- 2001: Amru Ibrahim Ali
- 2002: Medhat Salem Abul Salem
- 2003: Mustafa Taha Hussein
- 2004: Mustafa Taha Hussein
- 2005: Mohamed Jamel Mohamed Kamel

=== Long jump ===
- 1981: Mohamed Kharib Mansour
- 1982: Mohamed Kharib Mansour
- 1983: Mohamed Kharib Mansour
- 1984: Mohamed Kharib Mansour
- 1985: Ihab Ibrahim Abdel Hamid
- 1986: Ihab Ibrahim Abdel Hamid
- 1987: Gamal Ahmed Abdel Magid
- 1988: Ahmed Hassan Mohamed
- 1989: Youssef Sayed Mohamed Awad
- 1990: Youssef Sayed Mohamed Awad
- 1991: Youssef Sayed Mohamed Awad
- 1992: Mohamed Kamel Abdel Kader
- 1993: Mustafa Yakout Khalil
- 1994: Hatem Mersal
- 1995: Khaled Es Sayed Abu El Wafa
- 1996: Hatem Mersal
- 1997: Assama Ibrahim Abdel Moncef
- 1998: Hithem Noureddin Mohamed
- 1999: Hithem Noureddin Mohamed
- 2000: Assama Ibrahim Abdel Moncef
- 2001: Hithem Noureddin Mohamed
- 2002: Hatem Mersal
- 2003: Hatem Mersal
- 2004: Hatem Mersal
- 2005: Hatem Mersal

=== Triple jump ===
- 1981: Ahmed Hassan Badra
- 1982: Ahmed Hassan Badra
- 1983: Ahmed Hassan Badra
- 1984: Ahmed Hassan Badra
- 1985: Gamal Ahmed Abdel Magid
- 1986: Ahmed Hassan Badra
- 1987: Ahmed Hassan Badra
- 1988: Youssef Sayed Mohamed Awad
- 1989: Ahmed Hassan Badra
- 1990: Mohamed Kamel Abdel Kader
- 1991: Ahmed Hassan Mohamed
- 1992: Mohamed Kamel Abdel Kader
- 1993: Khaled Es Sayed Abu El Wafa
- 1994: Mohamed Kamel Abdel Kader
- 1995: Mohamed Kamel Abdel Kader
- 1996: Mohamed Kamel Abdel Kader
- 1997: Assama Ibrahim Abdel Moncef
- 1998: Mohamed Kamel Abdel Kader
- 1999: Assama Ibrahim Abdel Moncef
- 2000: Assama Ibrahim Abdel Moncef
- 2001: Hithem Noureddin Mohamed
- 2002: Hithem Noureddin Mohamed
- 2003: Mohamed Mohamed El Tohami
- 2004: Mohamed Mohamed El Tohami
- 2005: Ahmed Ibrahim Zhogbi

=== Shot put ===
- 1981: Nagui Asaad
- 1982: Mahmoud Ali Shaheen
- 1983: Ahmed Kamel Shatta
- 1984: Ahmed Kamel Shatta
- 1985: Ahmed Mohamed Ashoush
- 1986: Ahmed Mohamed Ashoush
- 1987: Ahmed Kamel Shatta
- 1988: Ahmed Kamel Shatta
- 1989: Hassan Ahmed Hamad
- 1990: Dhia Kamel Ahmed
- 1991: Mohamed Ismail Muslem
- 1992: Mohamed Ismail Muslem
- 1993: Mohamed Ismail Muslem
- 1994: Dhia Kamel Ahmed
- 1995: Ahmed Sayed Mohamed Ali
- 1996: Mohamed Kacem Awad
- 1997: Dhia Kamel Ahmed
- 1998: Dhia Kamel Ahmed
- 1999: Mohamed Kacem Awad
- 2000: Mohamed Kacem Awad
- 2001: Mohamed Kacem Awad
- 2002: Mohamed Abdelatif Abu Nasr
- 2003: Yasser Ibrahim Farag
- 2004: Yasser Ibrahim Farag
- 2005: Yasser Ibrahim Farag
- 2006: Yasser Ibrahim Farag

=== Discus throw ===
- 1981: Hassan Ahmed Hamad
- 1982: Hassan Ahmed Hamad
- 1983: Mohamed Naguib Hamed
- 1984: Hassan Ahmed Hamad
- 1985: Mohamed Naguib Hamed
- 1986: Mohamed Naguib Hamed
- 1987: Hassan Ahmed Hamad
- 1988: Mohamed Naguib Hamed
- 1989: Hassan Ahmed Hamad
- 1990: Mohamed Naguib Hamed
- 1991: Mohamed Naguib Hamed
- 1992: Mohamed Naguib Hamed
- 1993: Dhia Kamel Ahmed
- 1994: Dhia Kamel Ahmed
- 1995: Dhia Kamel Ahmed
- 1996: Sameh Mohamed Hassan El Hattab
- 1997: Sameh Mohamed Hassan El Hattab
- 1998: Sameh Mohamed Hassan El Hattab
- 1999: Sameh Mohamed Hassan El Hattab
- 2000: Sameh Mohamed Hassan El Hattab
- 2001: Sameh Mohamed Hassan El Hattab
- 2002: Omar Ahmed El Ghazaly
- 2003: Yasser Ibrahim Farag
- 2004: Omar Ahmed El Ghazaly
- 2005: Omar Ahmed El Ghazaly

=== Hammer throw ===
- 1981: Hisham Greiss
- 1982: Hisham Greiss
- 1983: Ahmed Ibrahim Taha
- 1984: Hisham Abdeslam Zaki
- 1985: Ahmed Ibrahim Taha
- 1986: Ahmed Ibrahim Taha
- 1987: Ahmed Ibrahim Taha
- 1988: Ahmed Ibrahim Taha
- 1989: Magdi Zakaria Abdallah
- 1990: Magdi Zakaria Abdallah
- 1991: Sherif Farouk El Hennawi
- 1992: Magdi Zakaria Abdallah
- 1993: Sherif Farouk El Hennawi
- 1994: Magdi Zakaria Abdallah
- 1995: Magdi Zakaria Abdallah
- 1996: Magdi Zakaria Abdallah
- 1997: Sherif Farouk El Hennawi
- 1998: Yamen Hussein Abdel Moneim
- 1999: Yamen Hussein Abdel Moneim
- 2000: Yamen Hussein Abdel Moneim
- 2001: Yamen Hussein Abdel Moneim
- 2002: Yamen Hussein Abdel Moneim
- 2003: Mohsen Mohamed Anani
- 2004: Mohsen Mohamed Anani
- 2005: Ahmed Abderraouf Mohamed

=== Javelin throw ===
- 1981: Slouma Ibrahim Awad
- 1982: Slouma Ibrahim Awad
- 1983: Akram Mohamed Khamis
- 1984: Slouma Ibrahim Awad
- 1985: Akram Mohamed Khamis
- 1986: Mohamed Abdel Halil El Ashri
- 1987: Akram Mohamed Khamis
- 1988: Akram Mohamed Khamis
- 1989: Slouma Ibrahim Awad
- 1990: Akram Mohamed Khamis
- 1991: Magdi Kamel Shaker
- 1992: Khaled Es Sayed Yassin
- 1993: Sayed Mohamed Abderrahman
- 1994: Walid Abderrazak Mohamed
- 1995: Khaled Es Sayed Yassin
- 1996: Khaled Es Sayed Yassin
- 1997: Khaled Es Sayed Yassin
- 1998: Khaled Es Sayed Yassin
- 1999: Khaled Es Sayed Yassin
- 2000: Walid Abderrazak Mohamed
- 2001: Walid Abderrazak Mohamed
- 2002: Sadek Abdel Mohsen Anani
- 2003: Sadek Abdel Mohsen Anani
- 2004: Walid Abderrazak Mohamed
- 2005: Walid Abderrazak Mohamed
- 2006: Walid Abdel Wahab

=== Decathlon ===
- 1985: Abu El Makarem El Hamd
- 1986: Abu El Makarem El Hamd
- 1987: Abu El Makarem El Hamd
- 1988: Abu El Makarem El Hamd
- 1989: Abu El Makarem El Hamd
- 1990: Issam Abdelatif Saber
- 1991: Issam Mohamed El Azzazi
- 1992: Hassan Farouk Sayed
- 1993: Issam Mohamed El Azzazi
- 1994: Hassan Farouk Sayed
- 1995: Hassan Farouk Sayed
- 1996: Hassan Farouk Sayed
- 1997: Hassan Farouk Sayed
- 1998: Issam Abdelatif Saber
- 1999: Issam Abdelatif Saber
- 2000: Mohamed Ahmed El Morsi
- 2001: Mustafa Taha Hussein
- 2002: Mustafa Taha Hussein
- 2003: Mohamed Ahmed El Morsi
- 2004: Mustafa Taha Hussein
- 2005: Abdallah Mohamed Saad Hamed

=== 10,000 metres walk ===
- 1985: Mujahid El Sayed El Sayed
- 1986: ?
- 1987: ?
- 1988: ?
- 1989: ?
- 1990: ?
- 1991: ?
- 1992: ?
- 1993: ?
- 1994: ?
- 1995: ?
- 1996: ?
- 1997: Hamed Farag Abdel Jalil
- 1998: Hamed Farag Abdel Jalil
- 1999: Mahouz Zaki Sayed
- 2000: Hamed Farag Abdel Jalil
- 2001: Rami Ali Dib
- 2002: ?
- 2003: ?
- 2004: ?
- 2005: Hamed Farag Abdel Jalil

=== 20 kilometres walk ===
- 1986: Mujahid El Sayed El Sayed
- 1987: Mujahid El Sayed El Sayed
- 1988: Mujahid El Sayed El Sayed
- 1989: Mujahid El Sayed El Sayed
- 1990: ?
- 1991: ?
- 1992: ?
- 1993: Nehad Es Sayed Abdel Hakim
- 1994: ?
- 1995: ?
- 1996: Nehad Es Sayed Abdel Hakim
- 1997: Hamed Farag Abdel Jalil
- 1998: ?
- 1999: ?
- 2000: ?
- 2001: ?
- 2002: Hamed Farag Abdel Jalil
- 2003: Karim Sobhi Abdel Adhim
- 2004: Mahmoud Mohamed Yassin

== Women ==
=== 100 metres ===
- 1981: Amal Kahil Mohamed
- 1982: Himmat Mohamed
- 1983: ?
- 1984: Amal Mohamed Fathi
- 1985: Wafa Bashir Asr
- 1986: Wafa Bashir Asr
- 1987: Wafa Bashir Asr
- 1988: Wafa Bashir Asr
- 1989: Karima Miskin Saad
- 1990: Muna Mohamed Mansour
- 1991: Wafa Bashir Asr
- 1992: Wafa Bashir Asr
- 1993: Leila Ibrahim Mohamed
- 1994: Habir Atia Hassan
- 1995: Ibtissam Fathi Hassan
- 1996: Karima Miskin Saad
- 1997: Karima Miskin Saad
- 1998: Wafa Mahmoud Mubarak
- 1999: Karima Miskin Saad
- 2000: Wafa Mahmoud Mubarak
- 2001: Wafa Mahmoud Mubarak
- 2002: Sarah Mohamed Mohamed
- 2003: Marwa Samir Idris
- 2004: Azza Abdel Basat Sayed
- 2005: Yousra Mejdi Douida

=== 200 metres ===
- 1981: Amal Kahil Mohamed
- 1982: Fatima Amir
- 1983: ?
- 1984: Nagwa Abd El Hay Riad
- 1985: Wafa Bashir Asr
- 1986: Wafa Bashir Asr
- 1987: Wafa Bashir Asr
- 1988: Wafa Bashir Asr
- 1989: Karima Miskin Saad
- 1990: Wafa Bashir Asr
- 1991: Wafa Bashir Asr
- 1992: Karima Miskin Saad
- 1993: Karima Miskin Saad
- 1994: Karima Miskin Saad
- 1995: Karima Miskin Saad
- 1996: Karima Miskin Saad
- 1997: Karima Miskin Saad
- 1998: Karima Miskin Saad
- 1999: Karima Miskin Saad
- 2000: Wafa Mahmoud Mubarak
- 2001: Sarah Fawzi El Shami
- 2002: Ines Abul Ala Mohamed
- 2003: Wafa Mahmoud Mubarak
- 2004: Azza Abdel Basat Sayed
- 2005: Yousra Mejdi Douida

=== 400 metres ===
- 1981: Fayza Abdel Naba Ibrahim
- 1982: Fatima Amir
- 1983: ?
- 1984: Aba Ahmed Abdel Wahab
- 1985: Aba Ahmed Abdel Wahab
- 1986: Samia Mahjoub Abdel Ghali
- 1987: Karima Miskin Saad
- 1988: Karima Miskin Saad
- 1989: Karima Miskin Saad
- 1990: Karima Miskin Saad
- 1991: Karima Miskin Saad
- 1992: Karima Miskin Saad
- 1993: Karima Miskin Saad
- 1994: Karima Miskin Saad
- 1995: Karima Miskin Saad
- 1996: Hala Ahmed Abderrahim
- 1997: Ibtissam Fathi Hassan
- 1998: Hala Ahmed Abderrahim
- 1999: Hala Ahmed Abderrahim
- 2000: Ines Abul Ala Mohamed
- 2001: Ines Abul Ala Mohamed
- 2002: Ines Abul Ala Mohamed
- 2003: Wafa Mahmoud Mubarak
- 2004: Wala Mohamed Ahmed
- 2005: Wala Mohamed Ahmed

=== 800 metres ===
- 1982: Zeinab Es Sayed Mersal
- 1983: ?
- 1984: Fayza Abdel Naba Ibrahim
- 1985: Fayza Abdel Naba Ibrahim
- 1986: Muna Fathi Jawida
- 1987: Nejia Kamel Mohamed
- 1988: Nejia Kamel Mohamed
- 1989: Huda Hashem Ismail
- 1990: Karima Miskin Saad
- 1991: Karima Miskin Saad
- 1992: Madeleine Fayez Amin
- 1993: Amani Abderrahim Belal
- 1994: Nadia Hamdi Ahmed
- 1995: Nadia Hamdi Ahmed
- 1996: Nadia Hamdi Ahmed
- 1997: Nadia Hamdi Ahmed
- 1998: Nadia Hamdi Ahmed
- 1999: Wala Mohamed Mohamed
- 2000: Wala Mohamed Mohamed
- 2001: Wala Mohamed Mohamed
- 2002: Wala Mohamed Mohamed
- 2003: Wafa Mahmoud Mubarak
- 2004: Wala Mohamed Ahmed
- 2005: Hena Said Jed Ahmed

=== 1500 metres ===
- 1982: Zeinab Es Sayed Mersal
- 1983: ?
- 1984: Sana Abdel Hadim Yacoubi
- 1985: Sana Abdel Hadim Yacoubi
- 1986: Ramzia El Shaffi Mutawali
- 1987: Nejia Kamel Mohamed
- 1988: Nejia Kamel Mohamed
- 1989: Rida Mohamed Ali
- 1990: Rida Mohamed Ali
- 1991: Rida Mohamed Ali
- 1992: Amna Bedawi Jemaa
- 1993: Nadia Hamdi Ahmed
- 1994: Nadia Hamdi Ahmed
- 1995: Nadia Hamdi Ahmed
- 1996: Nadia Hamdi Ahmed
- 1997: Nadia Hamdi Ahmed
- 1998: Nadia Hamdi Ahmed
- 1999: Nahed Salema Suleiman
- 2000: Nejia Jamal Sayed
- 2001: Wala Mohamed Mohamed
- 2002: Wala Mohamed Mohamed
- 2003: Shaymaa Ibrahim El Dessouki
- 2004: Shaymaa Ibrahim El Dessouki
- 2005: Shima Salah Sabri

=== 3000 metres ===
- 1984: Sana Abdel Hadim Yacoubi
- 1985: Sana Abdel Hadim Yacoubi
- 1986: Ramzia El Shaffi Mutawali
- 1987: Muna Sadek Jaber
- 1988: Rihab Wajdi El Hafnawi
- 1989: Rida Mohamed Ali
- 1990: Rida Mohamed Ali
- 1991: Rida Mohamed Ali
- 1992: Amna Bedawi Jemaa
- 1993: Dalia Nabil Abdel Hadim
- 1994: Rashida Amir Mohamed
- 1995: Not held
- 1996: Not held
- 1997: Not held
- 1998: Not held
- 1999: Not held
- 2000: Not held
- 2001: Not held
- 2002: Not held
- 2003: Not held
- 2004: Not held
- 2005: Sara Ahmed Mohamed Hassan

=== 5000 metres ===
- 1995: Rashida Amir Mohamed
- 1996: Rashida Amir Mohamed
- 1997: Iman Khaled Hassan
- 1998: Iman Khaled Hassan
- 1999: Iman Khaled Hassan
- 2000: Aisha Sayed Hafez
- 2001: Muna Mahmoud Mohamed
- 2002: Shaymaa Ibrahim El Dessouki
- 2003: Douaa Adel Es Sayed
- 2004: Douaa Adel Es Sayed
- 2005: Sara Ahmed Mohamed Hassan

=== 10,000 metres ===
- 1987: Amina Sayed Shalabi
- 1988: Fatima Ali Atia
- 1989: Karima Farag Mohamed
- 1990: Karima Farag Mohamed
- 1991: Karima Farag Mohamed
- 1992: Karima Farag Mohamed
- 1993: Iman Khaled Hassan
- 1994: Rashida Amir Mohamed
- 1995: Rashida Amir Mohamed
- 1996: Rashida Amir Mohamed
- 1997: Iman Khaled Hassan
- 1998: Nagwa Ibrahim Saleh Ali
- 1999: Nagwa Ibrahim Saleh Ali
- 2000: Iman Khaled Hassan
- 2001: Shaymaa Ibrahim El Dessouki
- 2002: Aisha Sayed Hafez
- 2003: Douaa Adel Es Sayed
- 2004: Douaa Adel Es Sayed
- 2005: Douaa Adel Es Sayed

=== Half marathon ===
- 1993: Nadia Hamdi Ahmed
- 1994: ?
- 1995: Dalia Nabil Abdel Hadim
- 1996: Naima Kamel Abd

=== 100 metres hurdles ===
- 1982: Dunia Ali Abu Ghazia
- 1983: Saad El Hanna El Lathi Mahmoud
- 1984: Ifaf Abdel Fatah Mohamed
- 1985: Ifaf Abdel Fatah Mohamed
- 1986: Saad El Hanna El Lathi Mahmoud
- 1987: Huda Hashem Ismail
- 1988: Huda Hashem Ismail
- 1989: Huda Hashem Ismail
- 1990: Huda Hashem Ismail
- 1991: Huda Hashem Ismail
- 1992: Huda Hashem Ismail
- 1993: Shirin Mohamed Kheiri El Atrabi
- 1994: Huda Hashem Ismail
- 1995: Rania Abdel Aziz Ahmed
- 1996: Shirin Mohamed Kheiri El Atrabi
- 1997: Rania Abdel Aziz Ahmed
- 1998: Shirin Mohamed Kheiri El Atrabi
- 1999: Nejia Ahmed Fouad
- 2000: Hajer Mohamed Jelel
- 2001: Rania Abdel Aziz Ahmed
- 2002: Nejia Ahmed Fouad
- 2003: Nanassi Zaki Saddik
- 2004: Rania Abdel Aziz Ahmed
- 2005: Ala Sabri Said Mohamed
- 2006: Abeer Assem Ghander

=== 400 metres hurdles ===
- 1984: Mirfat Ali Mabrouk
- 1985: Saad El Hanna El Lathi Mahmoud
- 1986: Saad El Hanna El Lathi Mahmoud
- 1987: Mirfat Ali Mabrouk
- 1988: Huda Hashem Ismail
- 1989: Huda Hashem Ismail
- 1990: Rania Mohamed Ali
- 1991: Hala Ali Morsi
- 1992: Rania Mohamed Ali
- 1993: Rania Mohamed Ali
- 1994: Amani Abderrahim Belal
- 1995: Rania Mohamed Ali
- 1996: Hala Ahmed Abderrahim
- 1997: Amani Abderrahim Belal
- 1998: Hala Ahmed Abderrahim
- 1999: Hala Ahmed Abderrahim
- 2000: Hala Ahmed Abderrahim
- 2001: Hala Ahmed Abderrahim
- 2002: Maha Mohamed Goha
- 2003: Hela Zakaria Jalil
- 2004: Rania Abdel Aziz Ahmed
- 2005: Hela Belsan Jilel

=== High jump ===
- 1982: Huda Abdel Hamid Ibrahim
- 1983: ?
- 1984: Mira Endouria
- 1985: Maha Rashid Mohamed
- 1986: Muna Ibrahim Ahmed
- 1987: Jihan Abdel Moneim Abdallah
- 1988: Ifaf Abdel Fatah Mohamed
- 1989: Jihan Abdel Moneim Abdallah
- 1990: Jihan Abdel Moneim Abdallah
- 1991: Jihan Abdel Moneim Abdallah
- 1992: Jihan Abdel Moneim Abdallah
- 1993: Badia Ali Abdessamia
- 1994: Ghada Mohamed Anwar
- 1995: Wala Hassan Kibad
- 1996: Shirin Mohamed Kheiri El Atrabi
- 1997: Shirin Mohamed Kheiri El Atrabi
- 1998: Nagwa Ibrahim Mohamed
- 1999: Maha Mohamed Mohamed
- 2000: Ghada Mohamed Anwar
- 2001: Fayza Fouad Ateya
- 2002: Fayza Fouad Ateya
- 2003: Fayza Fouad Ateya
- 2004: Amira Khaled Abou El Eta
- 2005: Amira Khaled Abou El Eta

=== Pole vault ===
- 1999: Maha Mohamed Abdel Khalek
- 2000: Maha Mohamed Abdel Khalek
- 2001: Maha Mohamed Abdel Khalek
- 2002: Nesrine Ahmed Imam
- 2003: Maha Mohamed Abdel Khalek
- 2004: Maha Mohamed Abdel Khalek
- 2005: Nada Mohamed Abdelatif Salem

=== Long jump ===
- 1982: Soheir Mohamed Ahmed
- 1983: Ifaf Abdel Fatah Mohamed
- 1984: Ifaf Abdel Fatah Mohamed
- 1985: Ifaf Abdel Fatah Mohamed
- 1986: Ifaf Abdel Fatah Mohamed
- 1987: Nagwa Abd El Hay Riad
- 1988: Nagwa Abd El Hay Riad
- 1989: Nagwa Abd El Hay Riad
- 1990: Nagwa Abd El Hay Riad
- 1991: Nagwa Abd El Hay Riad
- 1992: Iman Hanafi Mahmoud
- 1993: Nagwa Abd El Hay Riad
- 1994: Muna Sabri Mahmoud
- 1995: Muna Sabri Mahmoud
- 1996: Muna Sabri Mahmoud
- 1997: Nagwa Abd El Hay Riad
- 1998: Muna Sabri Mahmoud
- 1999: Muna Sabri Mahmoud
- 2000: Ghada Ismail Mustafa
- 2001: Muna Sabri Mahmoud
- 2002: Muna Sabri Mahmoud
- 2003: Muna Sabri Mahmoud
- 2004: Ghada Ismail Mustafa
- 2005: Dina Ismail Suleiman

=== Triple jump ===
- 1993: Nagwa Abd El Hay Riad
- 1994: Fatima Hassan Salahi
- 1995: Fatima Hassan Salahi
- 1996: Muna Sabri Mahmoud
- 1997: Nagwa Abd El Hay Riad
- 1998: Ghada Ismail Mustafa
- 1999: Ghada Ismail Mustafa
- 2000: Ghada Ismail Mustafa
- 2001: Ghada Ismail Mustafa
- 2002: Ghada Ismail Mustafa
- 2003: Muna Khalifa Kamel
- 2004: Ghada Ismail Mustafa
- 2005: Ghada Ismail Mustafa

=== Shot put ===
- 1982: Ouda Abdel Hamid Ibrahim
- 1983: Amina Mahmoud Mohamed
- 1984: Huda Ibrahim Ahmed
- 1985: Muna Fahmi Abu Rehab
- 1986: Hanan Ahmed Khaled
- 1987: Hanan Ahmed Khaled
- 1988: Hanan Ahmed Khaled
- 1989: Hanan Ahmed Khaled
- 1990: Hanan Ahmed Khaled
- 1991: Hanan Ahmed Khaled
- 1992: Hanan Ahmed Khaled
- 1993: Wafaa Ismail Baghdadi
- 1994: Hanan Ahmed Khaled
- 1995: Wafaa Ismail Baghdadi
- 1996: Hanan Ahmed Khaled
- 1997: Hanan Ahmed Khaled
- 1998: Wafaa Ismail Baghdadi
- 1999: Wafaa Ismail Baghdadi
- 2000: Wafaa Ismail Baghdadi
- 2001: Wafaa Ismail Baghdadi
- 2002: Wafaa Ismail Baghdadi
- 2003: Wafaa Ismail Baghdadi
- 2004: Wafaa Ismail Baghdadi
- 2005: Wafaa Ismail Baghdadi

=== Discus throw ===
- 1982: Ouda Salaheddin Moha
- 1983: Inhar Salah Eddin
- 1984: Shadia Ahmed Abdel Rasoul
- 1985: Inhar Salah Eddin
- 1986: Shadia Ahmed Abdel Rasoul
- 1987: Hanan Ahmed Khaled
- 1988: Hanan Ahmed Khaled
- 1989: Hanan Ahmed Khaled
- 1990: Hanan Ahmed Khaled
- 1991: Hanan Ahmed Khaled
- 1992: Hanan Ahmed Khaled
- 1993: Hanan Ahmed Khaled
- 1994: Hanan Ahmed Khaled
- 1995: Muna Yahia El Bassal
- 1996: Hanan Ahmed Khaled
- 1997: Hanan Ahmed Khaled
- 1998: Wala Khalil Ibrahim
- 1999: Hanan Ahmed Khaled
- 2000: Hiba Meshili Abu Zaghari
- 2001: Hiba Meshili Abu Zaghari
- 2002: Hiba Saad Abdallah
- 2003: Hiba Meshili Abu Zaghari
- 2004: Hiba Meshili Abu Zaghari
- 2005: Chima Mohamed Azzeddine

=== Hammer throw ===
- 1998: Hanan Ahmed Khaled
- 1999: Marwa Hussein
- 2000: Marwa Hussein
- 2001: Marwa Hussein
- 2002: Marwa Hussein
- 2003: Marwa Hussein
- 2004: Marwa Hussein
- 2005: Marwa Hussein

=== Javelin throw ===
- 1982: Zeinab Ali Mabrouk
- 1983: Amina Mahmoud Mohamed
- 1984: Amal Mahmoud El Sayed
- 1985: Amal Mahmoud El Sayed
- 1986: Wajla Abdel Moneim Ali
- 1987: Wajla Abdel Moneim Ali
- 1988: Wajla Abdel Moneim Ali
- 1989: Maya Ali Abdessamad
- 1990: Wajla Abdel Moneim Ali
- 1991: Amira Sayed Madhar
- 1992: Maya Ali Abdessamad
- 1993: Maya Ali Abdessamad
- 1994: Maya Ali Abdessamad
- 1995: Maya Ali Abdessamad
- 1996: Maya Ali Abdessamad
- 1997: Rania Moussa Khaled
- 1998: Hanaa Salah El Melegi
- 1999: Nesrine Mohamed Mohieddin
- 2000: Muna Mustafa Youssef
- 2001: Muna Mustafa Youssef
- 2002: Muna Mustafa Youssef
- 2003: Safar Mohamed El Mekkawi
- 2004: Hanaa Ramadan Omar
- 2005: Hanaa Ramadan Omar

=== Heptathlon ===
- 1985: Saliha Mohamed Mesiri
- 1986: Ifaf Abdel Fatah Mohamed
- 1987: Huda Hashem Ismail
- 1988: ?
- 1989: Badia Ali Abdessamia
- 1990: Huda Hashem Ismail
- 1991: Huda Hashem Ismail
- 1992: Huda Hashem Ismail
- 1993: Shirin Mohamed Kheiri El Atrabi
- 1994: Rania Mohamed Ali
- 1995: Shirin Mohamed Kheiri El Atrabi
- 1996: Rania Abdel Aziz Ahmed
- 1997: Shirin Mohamed Kheiri El Atrabi
- 1998: Houria Hassan Abu Megd
- 1999: Hani Jamal Es Sayed
- 2000: Hani Jamal Es Sayed
- 2001: Hani Jamal Es Sayed
- 2002: Shima Fathi Tehemar
- 2003: Shima Fathi Tehemar
- 2004: Shima Fathi Tehemar
- 2005: Monal Ismail Attar

=== 5000 metres walk ===
- 1985: Karima Si Mohamed
- 1986: ?
- 1987: ?
- 1988: ?
- 1989: ?
- 1990: ?
- 1991: ?
- 1992: ?
- 1993: ?
- 1994: ?
- 1995: ?
- 1996: ?
- 1997: Nagwa Ibrahim Saleh Ali
- 1998: Nagwa Ibrahim Saleh Ali
- 1999: Nagwa Ibrahim Saleh Ali
- 2000: Nagwa Ibrahim Saleh Ali

=== 10,000 metres walk ===
- 2002: Nagwa Ibrahim Saleh Ali
- 2003: Hanaa Es Sayed Jad
- 2004: ?
- 2005: Hanaa Es Sayed Jad

=== 10 kilometres walk ===
- 1987: Amani Mohamed Adel
- 1988: Amani Mohamed Adel
- 1989: Amani Mohamed Adel
- 1990: ?
- 1991: ?
- 1992: ?
- 1993: Nagwa Ibrahim Saleh Ali
- 1994: ?
- 1995: ?
- 1996: Nagwa Ibrahim Saleh Ali
- 1997: Nagwa Ibrahim Saleh Ali
- 1998: ?
- 1999: ?
- 2000: ?
- 2001: ?
- 2002: ?
- 2003: ?
- 2004: Hanaa Es Sayed Jad
