= List of Ugandan records in athletics =

The following are the national records in athletics in Uganda maintained by the Uganda Athletics Federation (UAF), except as indicated.

== Outdoor ==
Key to tables: Awaiting ratification Record not kept by the UAF Not ratified or later rescinded by the UAF

=== Men ===
| Event | Record | Athlete | Date | Meet | Place | Ref. |
|---|---|---|---|---|---|---|
| 100 m | 10.06 (+0.6 m/s) | Tarsis Orogot | 11 May 2024 | SEC Championships | Gainesville, United States | |
| 200 m | 19.75 (+1.0 m/s) | Tarsis Orogot | 11 May 2024 | SEC Championships | Gainesville, United States | |
| 300 m | 32.61 | Davis Kamoga | 13 August 1999 | | Viareggio, Italy | |
| 400 m | 44.37 | Davis Kamoga | 5 August 1997 | World Championships | Athens, Greece | |
| 800 m | 1:43.72 | Abraham Chepkirwok | 5 July 2008 | Meeting de Atletismo | Madrid, Spain | |
| 1000 m | 2:17.10 | Julius Achon | 30 July 1995 | Internationales Leichtathletik-Meeting Rhede | Rhede, Germany | |
| 1500 m | 3:30.58 | Ronald Musagala | 12 July 2019 | Diamond League | Fontvieille, Monaco | |
| 1500 m | 3:30.58 | Ronald Musagala | 24 August 2019 | Diamond League | Paris, France | |
| Mile | 3:53.04 | Ronald Musagala | 1 July 2021 | Bislett Games | Oslo, Norway | |
| Mile (road) | 4:00.72 | Salim Abu Mayanja | 1 October 2023 | World Road Running Championships | Riga, Latvia | |
| 2000 m | 5:08.81 | Julius Achon | 19 August 1994 | | Victoria, Canada | |
| 3000 m | 7:26.64 | Jacob Kiplimo | 17 September 2020 | Golden Gala | Rome, Italy | |
| Two miles | 8:07.54 | Joshua Cheptegei | 30 June 2019 | Prefontaine Classic | Stanford, United States | |
| 5000 m | 12:35.36 | Joshua Cheptegei | 14 August 2020 | Herculis | Fontvieille, Monaco | |
| 5 km (road) | 12:51 | Joshua Cheptegei | 16 February 2020 | Monaco Run 5km | Monaco | |
| 6 km (road) | 16:02+ | Joshua Cheptegei | 1 December 2019 | 10K Valencia Trinidad Alfonso | Valencia, Spain | |
| 4 miles (road) | 17:38 | Phillip Kipyeko | 12 October 2014 | 4 Mijl van Groningen | Groningen, Netherlands | |
| 8 km (road) | 21:37+ | Joshua Cheptegei | 1 December 2019 | 10K Valencia Trinidad Alfonso | Valencia, Spain | |
| 10,000 m | 26:11.00 | Joshua Cheptegei | 7 October 2020 | | Valencia, Spain | |
| 10 km (road) | 26:38 | Joshua Cheptegei | 1 December 2019 | 10K Valencia Trinidad Alfonso | Valencia, Spain | |
| 12 km (road) | 32:49+ | Joshua Cheptegei | 17 November 2024 | Zevenheuvelenloop | Nijmegen, Netherlands | |
| 15 km (road) | 40:07+ | Jacob Kiplimo | 16 February 2025 | Barcelona Half Marathon | Barcelona, Spain | |
| 10 miles (road) | 45:15 | Joshua Cheptegei | 23 September 2018 | Dam tot Damloop | Amsterdam–Zaandam, Netherlands | |
| 20 km (road) | 53:42+ | Jacob Kiplimo | 16 February 2025 | Barcelona Half Marathon | Barcelona, Spain | |
| Half marathon | 56:42 | Jacob Kiplimo | 16 February 2025 | Barcelona Half Marathon | Barcelona, Spain | |
| 25 km (road) | 1:11:12+ | Jacob Kiplimo | 12 October 2025 | Chicago Marathon | Chicago, United States | |
| 30 km (road) | 1:25:31+ | Jacob Kiplimo | 12 October 2025 | Chicago Marathon | Chicago, United States | |
| Marathon | 2:00:28 | Jacob Kiplimo | 26 April 2026 | London Marathon | London, United Kingdom | |
| 110 m hurdles | 14.48 NWI | Jean Baptiste Okello | 3 September 1960 | Olympic Games | Rome, Italy | |
| 400 m hurdles | 47.82 | John Akii-Bua | 2 September 1972 | Olympic Games | Munich, Germany | |
| 2000 m steeplechase | 5:27.63 | Simon Ayeko | 25 June 2010 | Meeting Stanislas | Tomblaine, France | |
| 3000 m steeplechase | 8:03.81 | Benjamin Kiplagat | 8 July 2010 | Athletissima | Lausanne, Switzerland | |
| High jump | 2.12 m A | David Okot | 16 July 2011 | | Nairobi, Kenya | |
| Pole vault | 4.57 m | Teddy Ruge | 15 May 1997 | | Abilene, United States | |
| Long jump | 7.75 m | Fidelis Ndyabagye | 26 July 1978 | All-Africa Games | Algiers, Algeria | |
| Triple jump | 16.26 m | Abraham Munabi | 17 January 1973 | All-Africa Games | Lagos, Nigeria | |
| Shot put | 15.76 m | Yovan Ochola | 4 November 1962 | | Colombo, Sri Lanka | |
| Discus throw | 50.98 m | Samuel Onyac | 29 May 1976 | | Zanzibar City, Tanzania | |
| Hammer throw | 53.72 m A | Yovan Ochola | 15 July 1972 | | Kampala, Uganda | |
| Javelin throw | 75.52 m | Justin Arop | 6 August 1988 | | Ulm, Germany | |
| Decathlon | 6805 points 6809 points | Teddy Ruge | 31 May – 1 June 2003 | | Dallas, United States | |
| Decathlon | 11.84 (100 metres), 6.20 m (20.3 ft) (long jump), 11.53 m (37.8 ft) (shot put), 1.92 m (6.3 ft) (high jump), 52.19 (400 metres), 15.09 (110 metres hurdles), 37.94 m (124.5 ft) (discus), 4.37 m (14.3 ft) (pole vault), 58.01 m (190.3 ft) (javelin), 4:57.42 (1500 metres) | | | | | |
| Decathlon | 6933 pts A | John Akii-Bua | 8–9 October 1971 | | Kampala, Uganda | |
| Decathlon | 100m (wind) / Long jump (wind) / Shot put / High jump / 400m / 110m H (wind) / Discus / Pole vault / Javelin / 1500m | | | | | |
| 20 km walk (road) | 1:57:02 | Nelsensio Byingingo | 27 August 1982 | African Championships | Cairo, Egypt | |
| 4 × 100 m relay | 39.67 A | Moses Musonge; Joseph Ssali; Sunday Olweny; Edward Bitoga | 8 August 1987 | All-Africa Games | Nairobi, Kenya | |
| 4 × 400 m relay | 3:02.09 | John Goville; Moses Kyeswa; Peter Rwamuhanda; Mike Okot | 11 August 1984 | Olympic Games | Los Angeles, United States | |
| 4 × 800 m relay | 7:53.34 | Peter Agaba; Julius Mutekanga; Peter Okwera; Geoffrey Lukwiya Akena | 24 May 2014 | IAAF World Relays | Nassau, Bahamas | |

=== Women ===
| Event | Record | Athlete | Date | Meet | Place | Ref. |
|---|---|---|---|---|---|---|
| 100 m | 11.33 A (+1.2 m/s) | Jacent Nyamahunge | 24 June 2022 | Ugandan Championships | Kampala, Uganda | |
| 200 m | 23.43 A (+1.7 m/s) | Leni Shida | 26 July 2019 | Ugandan Championships | Kampala, Uganda | |
| 400 m | 51.47 A | Leni Shida | 26 July 2019 (Note: by World Athletics and official result sources; 22 July 2018 by federation source, probably a typo) | Ugandan Championships | Kampala, Uganda | |
| 800 m | 1:57.26 | Halimah Nakaayi | 20 July 2024 | London Athletics Meet | London, United Kingdom | |
| 1000 m | 2:31.67 | Halimah Nakaayi | 11 July 2025 | Herculis | Fontvieille, Monaco | |
| 1500 m | 3:59.56 | Winnie Nanyondo | 16 June 2019 | Diamond League | Rabat, Morocco | |
| Mile | 4:18.65 | Winnie Nanyondo | 12 July 2019 | Diamond League | Fontvieille, Monaco | |
| Mile (road) | 4:43.22 Wo | Patience Cherop | 19 September 2026 | World Road Running Championships | Copenhagen, Denmark | |
| 3000 m | 8:31.27 | Sarah Chelangat | 15 June 2025 | BAUHAUS-galan | Stockholm, Sweden | |
| 5000 m | 14:39.38 | Charity Cherop | 16 May 2026 | Shanghai Diamond League | Shaoxing/Keqiao, China | |
| 5 km (road) | 14:28 Wo | Joy Cheptoyek | 31 December 2023 | Cursa dels Nassos | Barcelona, Spain | |
| 8 km (road) | 24:26+ Mx | Peruth Chemutai | 15 November 2026 | Zevenheuvelenloop | Nijmegen, Netherlands | |
| 10,000 m | 30:24.04 | Sarah Chelangat | 25 May 2024 | Prefontaine Classic | Eugene, United States | |
| 10 km (road) | 29:57 Mx | Peruth Chemutai | 11 October 2026 | The Great 10K | Berlin, Germany | |
| 12 km (road) | 36:53+ Mx | Peruth Chemutai | 15 November 2026 | Zevenheuvelenloop | Nijmegen, Netherlands | |
| 15 km (road) | 45:56 Mx | Peruth Chemutai | 15 November 2026 | Zevenheuvelenloop | Nijmegen, Netherlands | |
| 10 miles (road) | 50:41 | Joy Cheptoyek | 12 April 2026 | Cherry Blossom Ten Mile Run | Washington, D.C., United States | |
| 20 km (road) | 1:03:01+ Mx | Sarah Chelangat | 8 March 2026 | Paris Half Marathon | Paris, France | |
| Half marathon | 1:06:31 Mx | Sarah Chelangat | 8 March 2026 | Paris Half Marathon | Paris, France | |
| Half marathon | 1:07:18 Wo | Rebecca Chelangat | 26 January 2025 | Seville Half Marathon | Seville, Spain | |
| 25 km (road) | 1:19:59+ Mx | Stella Chesang | 1 December 2024 | Valencia Marathon | Valencia, Spain | |
| 30 km (road) | 1:36:35+ Mx | Stella Chesang | 1 December 2024 | Valencia Marathon | Valencia, Spain | |
| Marathon | 2:18:26 Mx | Stella Chesang | 1 December 2024 | Valencia Marathon | Valencia, Spain | |
| 100 m hurdles | 13.92 NWI | Ruth Kyalisima | 21 July 1978 | All-Africa Games | Algiers, Algeria | |
| 400 m hurdles | 57.02 | Ruth Kyalisima | 6 August 1984 | Olympic Games | Los Angeles, United States | |
| 2000 m steeplechase | 6:04.46 | Dorcus Inzikuru | 1 June 2005 | Grand Prix Regione Lombardia | Milan, Italy | |
| 3000 m steeplechase | 8:48.03 | Peruth Chemutai | 30 August 2024 | Golden Gala | Roma, Italy | |
| High jump | 1.71 m A | Victoria Atim | 8 December 1973 | | Kampala, Uganda | |
| Pole vault | 2.20 m A | Lucy Angucia | 12 May 2012 | | Kampala, Uganda | |
| Long jump | 6.43 m (+1.8 m/s) | Sarah Nambawa | 9 April 2011 | Boston-Moon Collegiate Classic | Nashville, United States | |
| Triple jump | 14.06 m (±0.0 m/s) | Sarah Nambawa | 9 April 2011 | Boston-Moon Collegiate Classic | Nashville, United States | |
| Shot put | 14.47 m | Joyce Aciro | 24 July 1978 | All-Africa Games | Algiers, Algeria | |
| Discus throw | 46.02 m A | Josephine Joyce Lalam | 22 May 2021 | | Kampala, Uganda | |
| Hammer throw | | | | | | |
| Javelin throw | 57.01 m | Josephine Joyce Lalam | 20 March 2024 | African Games | Accra, Ghana | |
| Heptathlon | 4849 pts | Ruth Kyalisima | 16–17 August 1985 | African Championships | Cairo, Egypt | |
| Heptathlon | 14.18 (100 metres hurdles), 1.57 m (5.2 ft) (high jump), 7.19 m (23.6 ft) (shot put), 24.84 (200 metres), 5.41 m (17.7 ft) (long jump), 25.38 m (83.3 ft) (javelin), 2:15.88 (800 metres) | | | | | |
| 20 km walk (road) | | | | | | |
| 35 km walk (road) | | | | | | |
| 50 km walk (road) | | | | | | |
| 4 × 100 m relay | 45.84 A | Farida Kyakutema; Mary Awora; Grace Buzu; Oliver Acii | 9 August 1987 | All-Africa Games | Nairobi, Kenya | |
| 4 × 400 m relay | 3:32.25 | W. S. Akullu; N. Nabirye; E. Nanziri; L. Shida | 30 August 2019 | | Rabat, Morocco | |

=== Mixed ===
| Event | Record | Athlete | Date | Meet | Place | Ref. |
|---|---|---|---|---|---|---|
| 4 × 400 m relay | 3:15.26 | Uganda; Godfrey Chanwengo; Maureen Banura; Haron Adoli; Leni Shida | 11 May 2025 | World Relays | Guangzhou, China | |

== Indoor ==
=== Men ===
| Event | Record | Athlete | Date | Meet | Place | Ref. |
|---|---|---|---|---|---|---|
| 60 m | 6.83 | Victor Sewankambo | 6 December 2025 | Crimson & Gold Invitational | Pittsburgh, United States | |
| 200 m | 20.17 A | Tarsis Orogot | 10 March 2023 | NCAA Division I Championships | Albuquerque, United States | |
| 400 m | 46.22 A | Emmanuel Tugumisirize | 14 March 2014 | NCAA Division I Championships | Albuquerque, United States | |
| 400 m | 46.05 OT | Emmanuel Tugumisirize | 25 January 2014 | Vanderbilt Invitational | Nashville, United States | |
| 500 m | 1:03.54 | Emmanuel Tugumisirize | 13 January 2018 | Great Dane Classic | Staten Island, United States | |
| 600 m | 1:19.43 | Julius Mutekanga | 14 February 2016 | New Balance Indoor Grand Prix | Roxbury, United States | |
| 800 m | 1:46.10 | Mike Okot | 12 February 1989 | Sparkassen Cup | Stuttgart, Germany | |
| 1500 m | 3:39.14 | Julius Achon | 9 March 2001 | World Championships | Lisbon, Portugal | |
| 3000 m | 7:37.4+ | Moses Kipsiro | 18 February 2012 | Aviva Indoor Grand Prix | Birmingham, United Kingdom | |
| Two miles | 8:08.16 | Moses Kipsiro | 18 February 2012 | Aviva Indoor Grand Prix | Birmingham, United Kingdom | |
| 5000 m | 14:00.38 | Samuel Kosgei | 13 March 2009 | NCAA Division I Championships | College Station, United States | |
| 60 m hurdles | | | | | | |
| 2000 m steeplechase | 5:26.13 | Simon Ayeko | 14 February 2010 | Indoor Flanders Meeting | Ghent, Belgium | |
| High jump | 1.91 m | Joseph Wananda | 16 January 2016 | | Menomonie, United States | |
| Pole vault | | | | | | |
| Long jump | 7.58 m A | Fidelis Ndyabagye | 24 February 1984 | Western Athletic Conference Championships | Colorado Springs, United States | |
| Triple jump | 16.08 m | Vincent Okot | 5 December 2015 | Vanderbilt Opener | Nashville, United States | |
| Shot put | 12.66 m | Vincent Okot | 2 December 2017 | | Nashville, United States | |
| Heptathlon | | | | | | |
| Heptathlon | 60m / Long jump / Shot put / High jump / 60m H / Pole vault / 1000m | | | | | |
| 5000 m walk | | | | | | |
| 4 × 400 m relay | | | | | | |

=== Women ===
| Event | Record | Athlete | Date | Meet | Place | Ref. |
|---|---|---|---|---|---|---|
| 60 m | 7.43 | Scovia Ayikoru | 21 February 2023 | Sun Belt Championships | Birmingham, United States | |
| 200 m | 23.22 | Scovia Ayikoru | 26 February 2023 | Last Chance Qualifier | Boston, United States | |
| 400 m | 53.17 | Scovia Ayikoru | 21 February 2023 | Sun Belt Championships | Birmingham, United States | |
| 800 m | 1:58.58 | Halimah Nakaayi | 17 February 2022 | Meeting Hauts-de-France Pas-de-Calais | Liévin, France | |
| 1000 m | 2:37.80 | Winnie Nanyondo | 10 February 2019 | Meeting Pas de Calais | Liévin, France | |
| 1500 m | 4:02.78 | Halimah Nakaayi | 6 February 2024 | Copernicus Cup | Kujawsko-Pomorska Arena Toruń, Poland | |
| Mile | 4:29.40 | Winnie Nanyondo | 16 February 2019 | Birmingham Indoor Grand Prix | Birmingham, United Kingdom | |
| 3000 m | 8:41.16 | Sarah Chelangat | 15 February 2023 | Meeting Hauts-de-France Pas-de-Calais | Liévin, France | |
| 5000 m | 15:40.03 | Dorcus Inzikuru | 31 January 2004 | Sparkassen Cup | Stuttgart, Germany | |
| 60 m hurdles | | | | | | |
| High jump | | | | | | |
| Pole vault | | | | | | |
| Long jump | 6.37 m | Sarah Nambawa | 7 January 2012 | Ed Temple Invitational | Nashville, United States | |
| Triple jump | 13.90 m | Sarah Nambawa | 11 December 2010 | MTSU Christmas Invitational | Murfreesboro, United States | |
| Shot put | | | | | | |
| Pentathlon | | | | | | |
| Pentathlon | 60m H / High jump / Shot put / Long jump / 800m | | | | | |
| 3000 m walk | | | | | | |
| 4 × 400 m relay | | | | | | |

== U20 (Junior) records ==
=== Men outdoor ===
| Event | Record | Athlete | Date | Meet | Place | Country | Age | Ref. |
|---|---|---|---|---|---|---|---|---|
| 100 m | 10.35 A | Tarsis Orogot | 1 Jul 2021 | National World U20 Trials | Nairobi, Kenya | 18 years, 219 days | | |
| 200 m | 20.37 A | Tarsis Orogot | 20 Aug 2021 | 18th World Athletics U20 Championships | Nairobi, Kenya | 18 years, 269 days | | |
| 400 m | 45.87 | Francis Ogola | 1 Aug 1992 | 25th Olympic Games | Barcelona, Spain | 19 years, 31 days | | |
| 800 m | 1:44.78 | Abraham Chepkirwok | 2 Jul 2007 | Tsiklitiria, Olympic Stadium | Athens, Greece | 18 years, 226 days | | |
| 1000 m | 2:17.10 | Julius Achon | 30 Jul 1995 | | Rhede, Germany | 18 years, 230 days | | |
| 1500 m | 3:36.15 A | Jacob Araptany | 22 Jul 2011 | National Championships | Kampala, Uganda | 19 years, 161 days | | |
| Mile run | 3:58.45 | Alex Cherop | 17 Jun 2009 | | Ostrava, Czech Republic | 16 years, 153 days | | |
| 2000 m | 5:08.81 | Julius Achon | 19 Aug 1994 | | Victoria | Canada | 17 years, 250 days | |
| 3000 m | 7:43.73 | Jacob Kiplimo | 5 May 2017 | IAAF Diamond League Meeting, Khalifa International Stadium | Doha | Qatar | 16 years, 172 days | |
| Two miles | 8:25.17 | Jacob Kiplimo | 25 May 2018 | Prefontaine Classic, IAAF Diamond League, Hayward Field | Eugene OR | United States | 17 years, 192 days | |
| 5000 m | 13:05.47 | Boniface Kiprop | 12 Sep 2004 | 63rd Internationales Stadionfest | Berlin | Germany | 18 years, 336 days | |
| 10,000 m | 27:04.00 | Boniface Kiprop | 3 Sep 2004 | | Bruxelles | Belgium | 18 years, 327 days | |
| 10 km (road) | 27:31 | Jacob Kiplimo | 19 May 2019 | Simplyhealth Great Manchester Run 10K | Manchester | Great Britain | 18 years, 186 days | |
| Half marathon | 1:01:12 | Ben Somikwo | 11 Oct 2015 | Marathon, Semi-Marathon & 10-K de Reims | Reims | France | 19 years, 7 days | |
| Marathon | 2:11:04 | Robert Chemonges | 30 Oct 2016 | VOLKSWAGEN 21. LJUBLJANA MARATHON | Ljubljana | Slovenia | 19 years, 15 days | |
| 2000 m steeplechase | 5:28.48 | Jacob Araptany | 22 May 2011 | 21st Internationales Läufermeeting, Schönbuchstadion | Pliezhausen | Germany | 19 years, 100 days | |
| 3000 m steeplechase | 8:14.29 | Benjamin Kiplagat | 24 May 2008 | | Hengelo | Netherlands | 19 years, 81 days | |
| Long jump | 7.06 m A | Francis Oketayot | 11 Jul 2014 | National Championships | Kampala | Uganda | 18 years, 253 days | |
| Triple jump | 15.33 m A | Felix Watmon | 25 Apr 2015 | 3rd National Trials, Mandela National Stadium | Kampala | Uganda | 18 years, 204 days | |
| Javelin throw | 70.80 m | Bonne Buwembo | 13 Sep 2008 | | Abingdon | Great Britain | 18 years, 264 days | |

=== Women outdoor ===
| Event | Record | Athlete | Date | Meet | Place | Age | Ref. |
|---|---|---|---|---|---|---|---|
| 100 m | 11.70 | Justine Bayiga | 30 May 1996 | | Masindi, Uganda | 17 years, 136 days | |
| 200 m | 24.15 A | Mary Apio | 17 Sep 1999 | | Johannesburg, South Africa | 19 years, 3 days | |
| 400 m | 52.73 | Justine Bayiga | 29 Jul 1998 | 7th IAAF World Junior Championships | Annecy, France | 19 years, 195 days | |
| 800 m | 2:00.40 | Annet Negesa | 29 May 2011 | Fanny Blankers-Koen Games | Hengelo, Netherlands | 19 years, 35 days | |
| 1000 m | 2:42.07 | Annet Negesa | 22 May 2011 | 21st Internationales Läufermeeting | Pliezhausen, Germany | 19 years, 28 days | |
| 1500 m | 4:08.15 | Prisca Chesang | 12 Jun 2021 | Meeting National à Thème de Nice | Nice, France | 17 years, 309 days | |
| 3000 m | 8:49.96 | Charity Cherop | 16 August 2025 | Kamila Skolimowska Memorial | Chorzów, Poland | 18 years, 43 days | |
| 5000 m | 15:00.61 | Sarah Chelangat | 15 Jun 2019 | Next Generation Athletics | Nijmegen, Netherlands | 18 years, 10 days | |
| 10,000 m | 31:06.46 | Sarah Chelangat | 10 Oct 2020 | FBK After Summer Competition | Hengelo, Netherlands | 19 years, 127 days | |
| 10 km (road) | 32:42 | Prisca Chesang | 15 May 2022 | Tcs World 10k Bengaluru | Bengaluru, India | 18 years, 281 days | |
| Half marathon | 1:13:31 | Adha Munguleya | 23 Sep 2018 | Hipporun Mezza Maratona di Vinovo | Vinovo, Italy | 19 years, 121 days | |
| 2000 m steeplechase | 6:31.12 | Loice Chekwemoi | 2 May 2023 | African U18 Championships | Ndola, Zambia | 16 years, 141 days | |
| 3000 m steeplechase | 9:07.94 | Peruth Chemutai | 20 Jul 2018 | 31st Herculis | Monaco | 19 years, 10 days | |
| Discus throw | 42.98 A | Josephine Lalam | 1 Jun 2019 | Akii Bua Memorial Meet | Kampala, Uganda | 18 years, 201 days | |
| Javelin throw | 55.59 A | Josephine Lalam | 22 Jun 2019 | Central Track & Field Championships | Kampala, Uganda | 18 years, 222 days | |

=== Men indoor ===
| Event | Record | Athlete | Date | Meet | Place | Age | Ref. |
|---|---|---|---|---|---|---|---|
| 60 m | 6.91 | Theodore Zake Kigonya | 16 Jan 2016 | South of England AA U20 / Senior Championships | London, United Kingdom | 18 years, 231 days | |
| 800 m | 1:46.91 | Abraham Chepkirwok | 3 Feb 2007 | Sparkassen Cup | Stuttgart, Germany | 18 years, 77 days | |
| 1000 m | 2:20.75 | Abraham Chepkirwok | 11 Feb 2007 | BW-Bank Meeting | Karlsruhe, Germany | 18 years, 85 days | |
| 3000 m | 8:03.03 | Dismas Yeko | 8 Feb 2023 | Meeting Elite en Salle de Mondeville | Mondeville, France | 18 years, 122 days | |
