= Uganda at the 1984 Summer Olympics =

- IOC code: UGA
- NOC: Uganda Olympic Committee

in Los Angeles
- Competitors: 26 (24 men and 2 women) in 5 sports
- Flag bearer: Ruth Kyalisima
- Medals: Gold 0 Silver 0 Bronze 0 Total 0

Summer Olympics appearances (overview)
- 1956; 1960; 1964; 1968; 1972; 1976; 1980; 1984; 1988; 1992; 1996; 2000; 2004; 2008; 2012; 2016; 2020; 2024

Uganda competed at the 1984 Summer Olympics in Los Angeles, United States. Uganda sent a delegation of 26 competitors (24 men and 2 women) across 5 sports, but among all the 26 competitors Uganda didn't win any medal. This marked a break in Uganda's Olympic medal streak, which had seen the country win medals in the three previous participating Summer Games (1968, 1972, and 1980).

== Athletics ==
Men
Track & road events

Athlete	Event	Heat		Quarterfinal		Semifinal		Final	
Athlete	Event	Result	Rank	Result	Rank	Result	Rank	Result	Rank
Wilaon Achia	Marathon	—N/a						DNF	
John Goville	200 m	21.59	2 Q	21.55	7	did not advance			
Moses Kyeswa	400 m	46.78	4	did not advance					
Charles Mbazira	100 m	11.03	7	did not advance					
Mike Okot	400 m	46.68	5	did not advance					
Vincent Ruguga	Marathon	—N/a						2:17:54	29
Peter Rwamuhanda	400 m hurdles	50.55	4	did not advance					
John Goville; Moses Kyeswa; Peter Rwamuhanda; Mike Okot	4 × 400 m relay	3:06.65	3 Q	—N/a		3:04.02	4 Q	3:02.09 NR	8

Field events

Athlete	Event	Qualification		Final	
Athlete	Event	Distance	Position	Distance	Position
Justin Arop	Javelin throw	68.76	27	did not advance	

Women
Track & road events

Athlete	Event	Heat		Quarterfinal		Semifinal		Final	
Athlete	Event	Result	Rank	Result	Rank	Result	Rank	Result	Rank
Evelyn Adiru	800 m	2:07.39	6	did not advance					
Ruth Kyalisima	400 m hurdles	57.38	3 Q	—N/a		57.02	7	did not advance	

== Boxing ==
Men

Athlete	Event	1 Round	2 Round	3 Round	Quarterfinals	Semifinals	Final
Athlete	Event	Opposition Result	Opposition Result	Opposition Result	Opposition Result	Opposition Result	Rank
William Bagonza	Light Flyweight	—N/a	Abbas Zaghayer (IRQ); L RSC-2	Paul Gonzales (USA); L 0-5	did not advance		
John Kakooza	Flyweight	—N/a	Fausto Garcia (MEX); L 0-5	did not advance			
John Siryakibbe	Bantamweight	Manuel Vilchez (VEN); W 3-2	Pedro Nolasco (DOM); L 0-5	did not advance			
Charles Lubulwa	Featherweight	Shane Knox (AUS); W 4-1	Dieudonne Mzatsi (GAB); W 5-0	Paul Fitzgerald (IRL); W 3-2	Peter Konyegwachie (NGR); L 0-5	did not advance	5
Geoffrey Nyeko	Lightweight	BYE	Ama Sodogah (TOG); W 5-0	Pernell Whitaker (USA); L 0-5	did not advance		
William Galiwango	Light Welterweight	Anthony Rose (JAM); W 5-0	Charles Nwokolo (NGR); L 0-5	did not advance			
Peter Okumu	Welterweight	BYE	Neya Mkadala (TAN); W TKO-1	Luciano Bruno (ITA); L 1-4	did not advance		
Vincent Byarugaba	Light Middleweight	BYE	Seifu Retta (NOR); W 4-1	Christophe Tiozzo (FRA); L 0-5	did not advance		
Patrick Lihanda	Middleweight	—N/a	Shin Joon-Sup (KOR); L 0-5	did not advance			
Jonathan Kiriisa	Light Heavyweight	—N/a	Djiguble Traoré (MLI); W 5-0	Kevin Barry (NZL); L 2-3	did not advance		
Dodovic Owiny	Heavyweight	—N/a	BYE	Michael Kenny (NZL); W RSC-2	Willie DeWit (CAN); L TKO-1	did not advance	5

== Cycling ==
Two cyclists represented Uganda in 1984.

Road

Athlete	Event	Time	Rank
Ernest Buule	Men's road race	DNF	
Muharud Mukasa	Men's road race	DNF	

== Swimming ==
Men

Athlete	Event	Heat		Semifinal		Final	
Athlete	Event	Time	Rank	Time	Rank	Time	Rank
Daniel Mulumba	100 metre freestyle	1:07.86	68	Did not advance			

== Weightlifting ==
Men

Athlete	Event	Snatch		Clean & Jerk		Total	Rank
Athlete	Event	Result	Rank	Result	Rank	Total	Rank
Fred Bunjo	−75 kg	105.0	20	140.0	18	245.0	18
John Kyazze	−110 kg	0	AC	120.0	12	120.0	AC

== Notable performance ==
While no medals were secured, some Ugandan athletes achieved notable results;

- The men's 4 × 400 metre relay team (John Goville, Moses Kyeswa, and Mike Okot) finished in eighth place in the final, setting a new national record.
- Boxer Charles Lubulwa reached the quarterfinals in the featherweight category, placing fifth overall.
- Boxer Dodovic Owiny also reached the quarterfinals in the heavyweight category, placing fifth overall.
- Vincent Ruguga finished 29th in the men's marathon.

== See also ==
- Uganda at the 1992 Summer Olympics
- Uganda at the 1996 Summer Olympics
- Uganda at the 2000 Summer Olympics
- Uganda at the 2004 Summer Olympics
- Uganda at the 2008 Summer Olympics
- Uganda at the 2012 Summer Olympics
- Uganda at the 2016 Summer Olympics
- Uganda at the 2020 Summer Olympics
- Uganda at the 2024 Summer Olympics
