= Uganda at the 1983 World Championships in Athletics =

- Flag of Uganda
- WA code: UGA

in Helsinki, Finland August 7–14, 1983
- Competitors: 6 (5 men and 1 woman) in 4 events
- Medals: Gold 0 Silver 0 Bronze 0 Total 0

World Championships in Athletics appearances
- 1983; 1987; 1991; 1993; 1995; 1997; 1999; 2001; 2003; 2005; 2007; 2009; 2011; 2013; 2015; 2017; 2019; 2022; 2023

Uganda competed at the 1983 World Championships in Athletics in Helsinki, Finland, from August 7 to 14, 1983.

== Men ==
Track and road events

Athlete	Event	Heat		Quarterfinal		Semifinal		Final	
Athlete	Event	Result	Rank	Result	Rank	Result	Rank	Result	Rank
Moses Kyeswa	400 metres	46.35	11 Q	46.31	14 Q	46.79	15	Did not advance	
Mike Okot	400 metres	46.69	=19 Q	46.38	16	Did not advance			
Peter Rwamuhanda	400 metres hurdles	50.99	=21	—		Did not advance			
John Goville; Mike Okot; Charles Mbazira; Moses Kyeswa	4 × 400 metres relay	DQ		—		Did not advance			

== Women ==
Track and road events

Athlete	Event	Heat		Semifinal		Final	
Athlete	Event	Result	Rank	Result	Rank	Result	Rank
Ruth Kyalisima	400 metres hurdles	57.58	18	Did not advance			
