= Association of Uganda University Sports =

National federation for university-level sports

- Sport: University Sports
- Jurisdiction: National
- Founded: 1992
- Headquarters: Balintuma Road,Mengo, Kampala, Uganda
- President: George Wagoogo
- (Uganda)

The Association of Uganda University Sports (AUUS) is a national federation for university-level sports in Uganda and it operates under the Ministry of Education and Sports of Uganda.

== History ==
Association of Uganda University Sports (AUUS) was founded in May 1992 under the name National University Sports Federation of Uganda (NUSFU) by four higher education institutions: Makerere University, Mbarara University of Science and Technology (MUST), Institute of Teacher Education Kyambogo (ITEK / now part of Kyambogo University), and Islamic University in Uganda (IUIU).

The founding was led by late Era N.B. Mugisa ( who was a Senior Principal Sports Tutor at Makerere University) by initiating the move to create a national university sports federation. In 1999, AUUS became affiliated with the International University Sports Federation (FISU).

== Governance ==
The Association of Uganda University Sports (AUUS) was led by Peninah Kabenge of Makerere University, who served as president from the early 2000s until 2025. In September 2025, George Wagoogo of Kyambogo University was elected president during the 30th Annual General Meeting held at Uganda Christian University in Mukono, succeeding Peninah Kabenge.

In addition these are the zonal coordinators, responsible for overseeing university sports activities in their respective regions:

- Central Region: Jesca Annet Kabasindi (Kampala International University)
- Eastern Region: Kebba Helon Haruna (Islamic University in Uganda)
- Northern Region: Opiyo Francis (Gulu University)
- Western Region: Arthur Kamugisha (Bishop Stuart University)
- South western Region: Benon Kanyesigye (Mbarara University of Science and Technology.

== Activities ==
National and Regional Competitions: Association of Uganda University Sports organizes inter-university tournaments and the annual AUUS Games across multiple sports.

Training and Coaching: Conducts coaching clinics, workshops, and mentorship programs for athletes and coaches and also it Provides certification and training for referees and sports officials to ensure fair play.

International Representation: AUUS prepares and coordinates university teams for continental and global competitions via FISU and FASU.
