= List of Egyptian athletes =

Egyptian athletes have won Track and Field medals in African, Pan Arab Games and international athletic events. Most of the gold medals in African or international event were won in the throwing events.

In the 1970s and 1980s Nagui Asaad, Hassan Ahmed Hamad, Hisham Greiss, Mohamed Naguib Hamed, Ahmed Kamel Shata and Ahmed Mohamed Ashoush formed one of the strongest Egyptian teams in the throwing events.

Nagui Asaad (1971 Mediterranean Games shot put) and Abdel Herin (1955 Mediterranean Games marathon) are the only Egyptian athletes (Track and field) to win a gold medal in the Mediterranean Gamess.

In the 1990s Hanan Ahmed Khaled won many gold medals in discus throw and shot put.

More recently a new generation of Egyptian athletes supervised by Nagui Asaad—like Yasser Ibrahim Farag and Omar Ahmed El Ghazaly—won a lot of medals in throw events at the African competitions.

== Shot put ==
- Nagui Asaad
- Ahmed Mohamed Ashoush
- Hanan Ahmed Khaled
- Yasser Ibrahim Farag
- Wafa Ismail El Baghdadi
- Omar Ahmed El Ghazaly
- Shebel Hassan Farag
- Gouda Attia

== Discus throw ==
- Mohamed Naguib Hamed
- Hassan Ahmed Hamad
- Nagui Asaad
- Hanan Ahmed Khaled

== Hammer throw ==
- Hisham Greiss
- Marwa Ahmed Hussein
- Mohsen El Anany

== Long jump ==
- Hatem Mersal
- Ezzedin Yacoub Hamed

== 100 metres ==
- Emad El Shafei

== 400 metres ==
- Amin Gomaa Badawi
- Farouk Tadros
- Mohamed El Sayed

== 800 metres ==
- Mohamed Abdel Rahman

== 1500 metres ==
- William Fahmi

== See also ==
- List of Egyptians
- African Championships in Athletics
- Mediterranean Games
- All Africa Games
- Pan Arab Games
