= Fidelis Ndyabagye =

Ugandan long jumper

Personal information
- Born: February 24, 1950 (age 76)
Medal record
Men's Athletics
Representing Uganda
All-Africa Games
Silver medal – second place	1978 Algiers	Long Jump

Fidelis Ndyabagye (born February 24, 1950) is a Ugandan athlete. He represented Uganda at the 1980 Olympics in the long jump. He also competed at the 1978 All-Africa Games where he won the silver medal in the long jump and set the still current Ugandan national record at 7.75 meters.

After the Olympics he attended the University of New Mexico. He won the Western Athletic Conference 1982, 1984 and 1985 Indoor Championships and the 1985 Outdoor championships. By the time of his 1985 championship, he was 35 years old. How he managed to pass the strict NCAA eligibility requirements at that age is not explained. His winning jump of 7.97 m (26 ft 1 3/4 in) at his home stadium in Albuquerque would not only be a new national record, but a masters M35 World Record. The Uganda Athletics Federation does not list the mark as a record, the WAC and University show the mark. The masters record would be surpassed a year later by Yugoslavian Nenad Stekić, who only a few years earlier had held the distinction of being the second best long jumper in history.
