= Boubacar Guèye =

Senegalese high jumper

Personal information
- Born: 2 October 1962 (age 63)

Sport
- Sport: Track and field
Medal record
Representing Senegal
African Championships
Gold medal – first place	1988 Annaba	High jump
Silver medal – second place	1982 Cairo	High jump
Silver medal – second place	1984 Rabat	High jump
Bronze medal – third place	1989 Lagos	High jump

Boubacar Guèye (born 2 October 1962) is a retired Senegalese high jumper.

Regionally, he won silver medals at the 1982 and 1984 African Championships, the gold medal at the 1988 African Championships, a bronze medal at the 1989 African Championships, and the silver at the 1991 All-Africa Games.
