= Masters M35 long jump world record progression =

This is the progression of world record improvements of the long jump M35 division of Masters athletics.

Key

Incomplete information Pending

Distance	Wind	Athlete	Nationality	Birthdate	Location	Date
8.50	1.9	Larry Myricks	United States	10.03.1956	New York City	15.06.1991
8.50	-1.3	Carl Lewis	United States	01.07.1961	Atlanta	29.07.1996
8.19		Nenad Stekic	Yugoslavia	07.03.1951	Formia	13.07.1986
7.97		Fidelis Ndyabagye	Uganda	24.02.1950	Albuquerque	10.05.1985
7.94		Igor Ter-Ovanesyan	Soviet Union	19.05.1938	Moscow	18.07.1973
7.91		Reijo Toivonen	Finland	25.08.1936	Kouvola	03.07.1972
7.90		Tom Chilton	United States	20.04.1937	Knoxville	08.06.1972
7.65		Jozef Schmidt	Poland	28.03.1935	Warsaw	10.10.1970
7.36		Roy Williams	New Zealand	09.09.1934	Auckland	25.01.1970
