= Nagui Asaad =

Egyptian shot putter and discus thrower

Personal information
- Born: 12 September 1945
Medal record
Men's athletics
Representing Egypt
All-Africa Games
Gold medal – first place	1973 Lagos	Shot Put
Gold medal – first place	1978 Algiers	Shot Put
Silver medal – second place	1973 Lagos	Discus
African Championships
Gold medal – first place	1979 Dakar	Shot put
Gold medal – first place	1982 Cairo	Shot put
Mediterranean Games
Gold medal – first place	1971 Izmir	Shot Put
Silver medal – second place	1971 Izmir	Discus
Silver medal – second place	1979 Split	Shot Put

Nagui Asaad Youssef (a.k.a. Nagy Assaad Youssef) ناجى أسعد, (born 12 September 1945), is a retired Egyptian athlete (track and field) who represented Egypt in international athletics events in the 1970s and early 1980s in shot put and discus throw.

== Biography ==
Nagui Asaad was born on 12 September 1945 to a Coptic family in the north of Egypt. He moved to Cairo where he graduated from the Faculty of Sport (Physical) Education for Boys at Helwan University. He later worked as a member of teaching staff in the same faculty after graduation. He obtained PhD in Physical Education, and currently works as a professor in the same faculty.

Nagui Asaad played in the Basketball team of Al Ahly Sporting club between 1966 and 1969 then he joined the Athletic team at the same club and became the Egyptian champion in Shot Put.

Along with his colleagues Hisham Greiss, Hassan Ahmed Hamad and Mohamed Naguib Hamed formed one of the strongest Egyptian teams in throw events, a lot of Egyptian sport experts consider them to be the strongest team Egypt ever had.

Following his retirement from competitive events he Worked for many years in Bahrain as a coach for the national Athletic team and returned to Egypt in the 1990s to work in the same field with the Egyptian national team as the squad's technical manager.

In 1999 as he was setting up a throwing school in Egypt, he recruited Discus thrower Omar Ahmed El Ghazaly and hammer thrower Mohsen El Anany who joined the Egyptian squad after that and won championships in their fields under his supervision. Achievements of the Egyptian team under nagui Asaad's management were described as unprecedented in the history of Egypt's Athletics Federation since its 1910 founding.

== Achievements ==
Nagui Asaad remains the only Egyptian athlete (track and field) to win Gold medals in three major championships, namely; All Africa Games, Mediterranean Games and African Championships in Athletics. He has won a total of three medals at the Mediterranean Games one gold and two silver. He was the first Egyptian to exceed 20 metres in shot put throws.

Nagui Asaad and Abdel Herin (1955 Mediterranean Games Marathon) remain to date the only two Egyptian Track and field athletes to have won a Gold medal each in the Mediterranean Games.

Internationally he ranks as number 130 of the world's 150 all-time best throws shot put by 20.71 Metre.

=== Championships record throws ===
Nagui Asaad held the championship record of the African Championships since 1982 African Championships in Athletics, with a throw of 20.44 metres. until 2004 African Championships in Athletics when Janus Robberts achieved 21.02.

His record shot put throw in All Africa games of 19.48 stood since 1973 All-Africa Games as the championship record for twenty six years until Burger Lambrechts broke it at the 1999 All-Africa Games.

Between 1971 and 1979 Nagui Asaad held the championship record of the Mediterranean Games in Shot Put with a throw of 20.19 Meters, this record was broken by Vladimir Milić from Yugoslavia in 1979.

=== Shot Put Medals ===
- Twice African champion in Shot Put, 1979, 1982.
- Gold medallist in shot put of the 1971 Mediterranean Games, İzmir (Turkey)
- Twice Gold medallist in Shot Put of the All Africa Games, 1973, Nigeria, 1978, Algeria
- Twice Gold medallist in Shot Put of East and Central African Championships 1981, 1982.
- Gold medallist in shot put of the 1980 Liberty Bell Classic (19.69 m), (Olympic Boycott Games) the alternative event arranged for those nations boycotting the 1980 Olympic Games
- Silver medallist in shot put of the 1979 Mediterranean Games, Split, Yugoslavia

Year	Tournament	Venue	Result	Event
1971	Mediterranean Games	İzmir, Turkey	1st	Shot Put
1973	All-Africa Games	Lagos, Nigeria	1st	Shot Put
1978	All-Africa Games	Algiers, Algeria	1st	Shot Put
1979	African Championship	Dakar, Senegal	1st	Shot Put
1979	Mediterranean Games	Split, Yugoslavia	2nd	Shot Put
1980	Olympic Boycott Games	Philadelphia, United States	1st	Shot Put
1982	African Championship	Cairo, Egypt	1st	Shot Put

=== Discus medals ===
- Silver medallist in Discus throw of the 1971 Mediterranean Games, İzmir (Turkey)
- Silver medallist in Discus throw of the All Africa Games, Nigeria, 1973 .

Year	Tournament	Venue	Result	Event
1971	Mediterranean Games	İzmir, Turkey	2nd	Discus
1973	All-Africa Games	Lagos, Nigeria	2nd	Discus

== Olympic Games ==
Despite multiple attempts, Nagui Asaad never competed in any of the Summer Olympic Games

- 1968 Summer Olympics, Nagui Asaad missed qualifying for the Egyptian Olympic team - by two centimeters.
- 1972 Summer Olympics, he went with the Egyptian team to Munich, but was withdrawn by his government after the Munich massacre when members of the Israeli Olympic team were taken hostage and eventually murdered by the Islamic terrorist group Black September.
- 1976 Summer Olympics, after arrival to Montréal, Egypt withdrew from the Games as part of the anti-apartheid boycott. This was due to that in 1972 and 1976 a large number of African countries threatened the IOC with a boycott to force them to ban South Africa and Rhodesia, because of their segregationist regimes. New Zealand was also one of the African boycott targets, due to the "All Blacks" (national rugby team) having toured apartheid-ruled South Africa. The IOC conceded in the first two cases, but refused to ban New Zealand on the grounds that rugby was not an Olympic sport. Fulfilling their threat, twenty African countries were joined by Guyana and Iraq in a Tanzania-led withdrawal from the Montreal Games, after a few of their athletes had already competed. Athletes from Cameroon, Egypt, Morocco, and Tunisia competed on July 18–20 before these nations withdrew from the Games.
- 1980 Summer Olympics, Egypt Boycotted the Moscow Games and he went to become the Gold medallist in shot put of the 1980 Liberty Bell Classic, (Olympic Boycott Games) the alternative event arranged for those nations boycotting the 1980 Olympic Games.

== See also ==
- Egyptian athletes
- List of prominent Copts
- Athletics at the 1973 All-Africa Games
- Athletics at the 1978 All-Africa Games
- 1979 African Championships in Athletics
- 1982 African Championships in Athletics
- List of Egyptians
- Helwan University
- African Championships in Athletics
- Mediterranean Games
- All Africa Games
- List of champions of Africa of athletics
