= Beatrice Ayikoru =

Ugandan athletics administrator, athlete and sports activist

- Other name: Beatrice Patience Ayikoru
- Citizenship: Uganda
- Occupations: Athletics administrator; Athlete; Sports activist
- Employers: World Athletics; Confederation of African Athletics; Uganda Olympic Committee; Uganda Athletics Federation
- Awards: Presidential award for good service in sports; IAAF Pin for good service in Athletics

Beatrice Patience Ayikoru is a Ugandan athletics administrator, former athlete and sports activist. She became the first Ugandan to serve on the World Athletics Council.

Ayikoru is serving as the general secretary for the Uganda Athletics Federation (UAF), secretary general for the Uganda Olympic Committee, deputy director for development on the Confederation of African Athletics.

She served as the second vice president at the Uganda Olympic Committee from 2017 to 2020, elected on the 52nd IAAF Congress in Doha and was on IAAF World Cross Country Committee, currently known as World Athletics. Ayikoru's career in sports leadership has involves advocating for more women in leadership roles within athletics, particularly in Uganda.

== Career ==
Ayikoru served as the treasurer for the Uganda Athletics Federation in 1995, Assistant general secretary for the Uganda Athletics Federation from 1997 to 2005, Chairperson and member of the Uganda Olympic Committee Women Commission 2001 – 2009, second vice president, for the Uganda Olympic Committee (UOC) from 2017 to 2021.

Ayikoru served as the secretary Local Organizing Committee for the IAAF World Cross Country Kampala in 2017, member of the IAAF Cross Country Committee as a female representative, served as a council member of the World Athletics (WA) from 2019 to 2023, member of the jury for the IAAF World U-18 Athletics Championships and a member of the World Athletics Gender Leadership Task Force. She was the Chef de Mission for the XXI Commonwealth Games in Gold Coast. She was the Chef de Mission for Tokyo 2020 Olympic Games.

She has served as general secretary for the Uganda Athletics Federation from 2005 to date (as at 2025), secretary general for the Uganda Olympic Committee (UOC) and the Commonwealth Games Association Uganda since 2021 to date (as at 2025).

== Athletic career ==
Ayikoru was a former athlete in 3000m, 5000m, 10000m road and cross country running, and IAAF Level I Coach education and certification system, also known as the World Athletics Coach Education and Certification System (CECS).

== Awards, recognitions and achievements ==
- Presidential award for good service in sports awarded by Yoweri Kaguta Museveni.
- IAAF Pin for good service in Athletics awarded by the President IAAF, Primo Nebiolo.
- Hosted the World Cross Country Championship.
