= 1988 African Championships in Athletics =

- Dates: 29 August–2 September
- Host city: Annaba, Algeria

The 1988 African Championships in Athletics were held in Annaba, Algeria, between 29 August and 2 September.

== Medal summary ==
=== Men's events ===
Event	Gold		Silver		Bronze	
100 metres (wind: +1.1 m/s)	John Myles-Mills; Ghana	10.25	Charles-Louis Seck; Senegal	10.29	Iziak Adeyanju; Nigeria	10.34
200 metres (wind: -2.3 m/s)	Davidson Ezinwa; Nigeria	20.97	Emmanuel Tuffour; Ghana	21.00	Mustapha Kamel Selmi; Algeria	21.21
400 metres	Innocent Egbunike; Nigeria	45.43	Gabriel Tiacoh; Ivory Coast	45.86	Moses Ugbisie; Nigeria	46.04
800 metres	Babacar Niang; Senegal	1:46.99	Getahun Ayana; Ethiopia	1:47.46	Ahmed Belkessam; Algeria	1:47.49
1500 metres	Getahun Ayana; Ethiopia	3:42.77	Mahmoud Kalboussi; Tunisia	3:43.44	Mustapha Lachaal; Morocco	3:43.48
5000 metres	Brahim Boutayeb; Morocco	13:49.69	Haji Bulbula; Ethiopia	13:50.08	Mohamed Issangar; Morocco	14:02.25
10000 metres	Brahim Boutayeb; Morocco	28:55.28	Haji Bulbula; Ethiopia	29:04.65	Mohamed Choumassi; Morocco	29:30.59
Marathon	Dereje Nedi; Ethiopia	2:27:51	Allaoua Khélil; Algeria	2:28:11	Kebede Balcha; Ethiopia	2:29:04
3000 metre steeplechase	Azzedine Brahmi; Algeria	8:26.56	Abdelaziz Sahere; Morocco	8:27.30	Kamel Benlakhlef; Algeria	8:38.21
110 metres hurdles (wind: -1.0 m/s)	Noureddine Tadjine; Algeria	14.33	Marcelin Dally; Ivory Coast	14.35	Zouhair Khazine; Morocco	14.46
400 metres hurdles	Amadou Dia Bâ; Senegal	48.81	Henry Amike; Nigeria	49.36	Hamidou Mbaye; Senegal	50.27
4 × 100 metres relay	Nigeria; Iziak Adeyanju; Chidi Imoh; Davidson Ezinwa; Olapade Adeniken	39.27 CR	Ghana; Myles Mills; Nelson Boateng; Eric Akogyiram; Emmanuel Tuffour	39.44	Senegal; Charles-Louis Seck; Joseph Diaz; Ibrahima Tamba; Hamidou M'Baye	39.66
4 × 400 metres relay	Ethiopia; Achalew Tesfaye; Baro Worku; Bach Ojulu; Alemayehu Gudeta	3:07.11	Ivory Coast; Akissi Simon Kpidi; Lancine Fofana; Anatole Zongo Kuyo; Gabriel Tiacoh	3:08.45	Burundi; Charles Nkazamyampi; Soter Bimenyimana; Cyprien Rugerinyange; Pierre-Claver Nyabenda	3:09.11
20 kilometre road walk	Mohamed Bouhalla; Algeria	1:27:43 CR	Abdelwahab Ferguène; Algeria	1:34:07	Arezki Boumrar; Algeria	1:41:46
High jump	Boubacar Guèye; Senegal	2.16	Paul Ngadjadoum; Chad	2.16	Fred Salle; Cameroon	2.13
Pole vault	Choukri Abahnini; Tunisia	4.90 CR	Mejdi Drine; Tunisia	4.80	Samir Agsous; Algeria	4.80
Long jump	Yusuf Alli; Nigeria	7.78	Fred Salle; Cameroon	7.53	Lotfi Khaïda; Algeria	7.51
Triple jump	António Santos; Angola	16.43 (NR)	Lotfi Khaïda; Algeria	16.22w	Fethi Khelid Aboud; Libya	16.00
Shot put	Ahmed Mohamed Ashoush; Egypt	19.40	Ahmed Kamel Shata; Egypt	19.00	Adewale Olukoju; Nigeria	17.70
Discus throw	Adewale Olukoju; Nigeria	62.12	Hassan Ahmed Hamad; Egypt	55.94	Yacine Louail; Algeria	47.72
Hammer throw	Hakim Toumi; Algeria	69.06	Djamel Zouiche; Algeria	63.92	Sherif Farouk El Hennawi; Egypt	59.28
Javelin throw	Justin Arop; Uganda	74.52	Tarek Chaabani; Tunisia	67.50	Samir Ménouar; Algeria	64.62
Decathlon	Mahmoud Aït Ouhamou; Algeria	7160 CR	Mourad Mahour Bacha; Algeria	7128	Abdennacer Moumen; Morocco	7051

=== Women's events ===
Event	Gold		Silver		Bronze	
100 metres (wind: +1.5 m/s)	Mary Onyali; Nigeria	11.25	Falilat Ogunkoya; Nigeria	11.51	Lalao Ravaonirina; Madagascar	11.54
200 metres (wind: +2.7 m/s)	Falilat Ogunkoya; Nigeria	23.33w	Martha Appiah; Ghana	23.72w	Veronica Bawuah; Ghana	24.35w
400 metres	Airat Bakare; Nigeria	52.15	Célestine N'Drin; Ivory Coast	52.77	Mercy Addy; Ghana	52.88
800 metres	Hassiba Boulmerka; Algeria	2:06.16	Maria de Lurdes Mutola; Mozambique	2:06.55	Sheila Seebaluck; Mauritius	2:08.26
1500 metres	Hassiba Boulmerka; Algeria	4:12.14	Fatima Aouam; Morocco	4:12.57	Getenesh Urge; Ethiopia	4:17.61
3000 metres	Fatima Aouam; Morocco	8:59.19	Josiane Boullé; Mauritius	9:14.37	Tigist Moreda; Ethiopia	9:15.92
10,000 metres	Marcianne Mukamurenzi; Rwanda	33:03.98	Hassania Darami; Morocco	33:41.75	Malika Benhabylès; Algeria	35:41.80
100 metres hurdles (wind: -1.1 m/s)	Maria Usifo; Nigeria	13.71	Dinah Yankey; Ghana	13.94	Yasmina Azzizi; Algeria	14.08
400 metres hurdles	Maria Usifo; Nigeria	56.74	Ruth Kyalisima; Uganda	57.32	Marie Womplou; Ivory Coast	57.60
4 × 100 metres relay	Ghana; Veronica Bawuah; Dinah Yankey; Mercy Addy; Martha Appiah	44.68	Ivory Coast; Alimata Koné; Louise Kore; Marie Womplou; Patricia Foufoué Ziga	45.59	Senegal; Aida Diop; Ndeye Aminata Niang; Aïssatou Tandian; Nene Sanghare	46.45
4 × 400 metres relay	Uganda; Ajilo; Ruth Kyalisima; Grace Buzu; Farida Kyakutema	3:37.74	Ivory Coast; Marie Womplou; Alimata Koné; Louise Kore; Célestine N'Drin	3:38.30	Morocco; Fatima Aouam; Nezha Bidouane; Chadia Moubtakir; Fatima Najjam	3:50.25
5000 metre track walk	Sabiha Mansouri; Algeria	25:51.70	Dalila Frihi; Algeria	27:06.20	Kheïra Sadat; Algeria	29:19.30
High jump	Lucienne N'Da; Ivory Coast	1.80	Constance Senghor; Senegal	1.68	Salimata Coulibaly; Ivory Coast	1.68
Long jump	Juliana Yendork; Ghana	5.70	Néné Sangharé; Senegal	5.68w	Fatou Tambédou; Senegal	5.56w
Shot put	Hanan Ahmed Khaled; Egypt	15.02	Souad Malloussi; Morocco	14.85	Jeanne Ngô Minyemeck; Cameroon	13.92
Discus throw	Grace Apiafi; Nigeria	50.60	Hanan Ahmed Khaled; Egypt	47.58	Zoubida Laayouni; Morocco	47.50
Javelin throw	Yasmina Azzizi; Algeria	48.82	Samia Djémaa; Algeria	45.74	Schola Mujawamaria; Uganda	44.86
Heptathlon	Yasmina Azzizi; Algeria	5740	Marie-Lourdes Ally Samba; Mauritius	4821	Huda Hashem Ismail; Egypt	4289

== Medal table ==
Rank	Nation	Gold	Silver	Bronze	Total
1	Nigeria (NGR)	11	2	3	16
2	Algeria (ALG)	10	7	11	28
3	Morocco (MAR)	3	4	7	14
4	Ghana (GHA)	3	4	2	9
5	Senegal (SEN)	3	3	4	10
6	Ethiopia (ETH)	3	3	3	9
7	Egypt (EGY)	2	3	2	7
8	Uganda (UGA)	2	1	1	4
9	Ivory Coast (CIV)	1	6	2	9
10	Tunisia (TUN)	1	3	0	4
11	Angola (ANG)	1	0	0	1
11	Rwanda (RWA)	1	0	0	1
13	Mauritius (MRI)	0	2	1	3
14	Cameroon (CMR)	0	1	2	3
15	Chad (CHA)	0	1	0	1
15	Mozambique (MOZ)	0	1	0	1
17	Burundi (BDI)	0	0	1	1
17	Libya (LBA)	0	0	1	1
17	Madagascar (MAD)	0	0	1	1
Totals (19 entries)		41	41	41	123

== See also ==
- 1988 in athletics (track and field)
