= Boubacar Diallo (athlete) =

Senegalese sprinter

Personal information
- Nationality: Senegalese
- Born: 22 November 1954 (age 71)

Sport
- Sport: Sprinting
- Event: 100 metres
Medal record
Men's athletics
Representing Senegal
African Championships
Gold medal – first place	1982 Cairo	200 m
Gold medal – first place	1984 Rabat	4×400 m
Silver medal – second place	1979 Dakar	4×100 m
Silver medal – second place	1982 Cairo	4×100 m
Silver medal – second place	1982 Cairo	4×400 m
Bronze medal – third place	1982 Cairo	100 m

Boubacar Diallo (born 22 November 1954) is a Senegalese former sprinter who represented his country at international competitions. He competed in the men's 100 metres at the 1980 Summer Olympics.

== International competitions ==
Year	Competition	Venue	Position	Event	Time	Notes
1983	World Championships	(Finland) Helsinki	8th (sf)	200 m	20.96	wind +1.4
