= Sarah Chelangat =

Ugandan long-distance runner

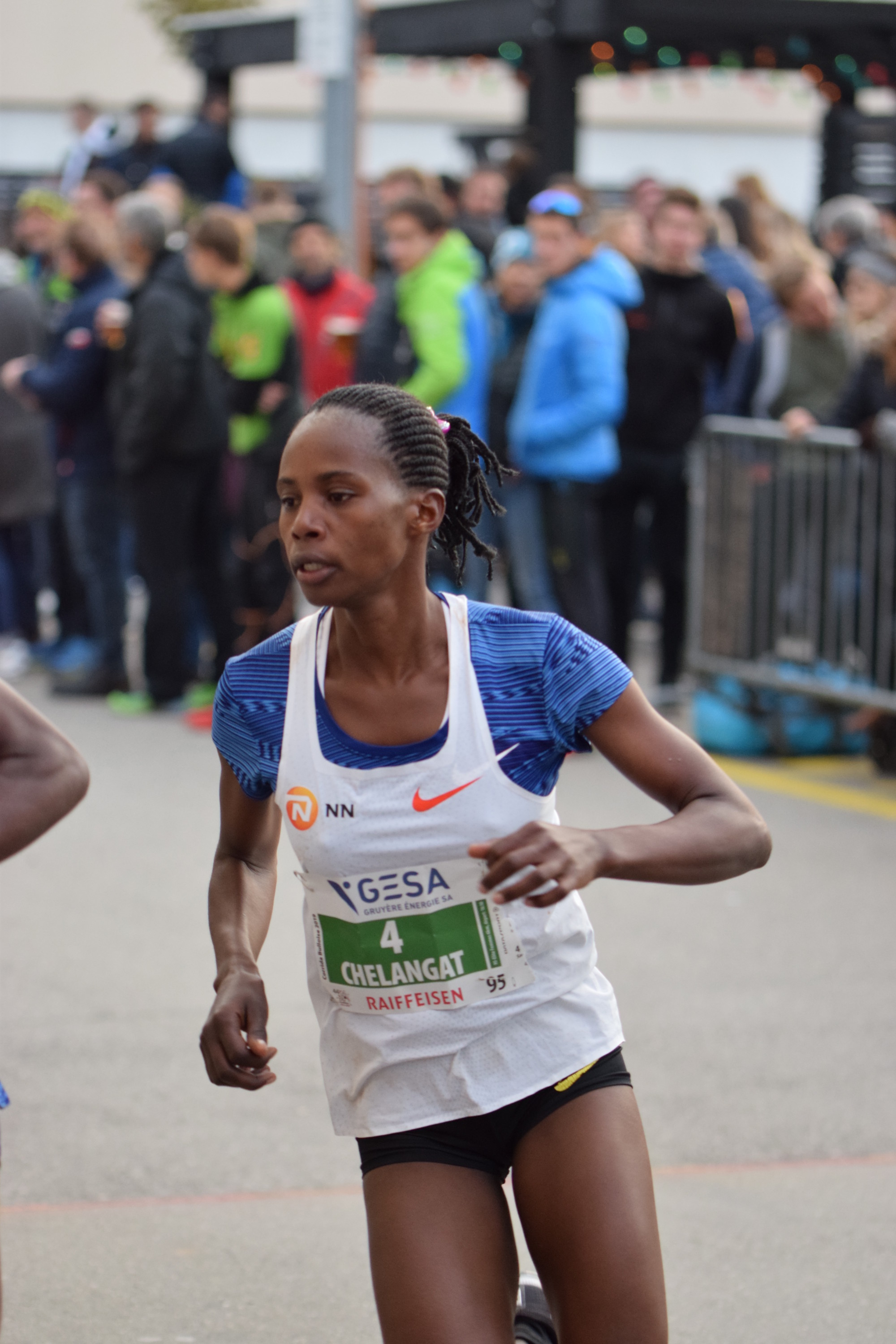
- Chelangat in 2019

Personal information
- Nationality: Ugandan
- Born: 5 June 2001 (age 25)

Sport
- Sport: Athletics
- Events: 1500 metres; 5000 metres; 10000 metres

Achievements and titles
- Personal bests: 1500 meters: 4:18.77 (2019) 3000 meters: 8:32.53 (2023) NR; 5000 meters: 14:40.88 (2024) NR; 10,000 meters: 30:24.04 (2024) NR; 10K: 30:24 (2023) Half marathon: 1:07.59 (2024) NR
Medal record
Women's athletics
Representing Uganda
World Cross Country Championships
Bronze medal – third place	2026 Tallahassee	Senior team

Sarah Chelangat (born 5 June 2001) is a Ugandan track and field athlete who specializes in long-distance running. She represented Uganda at the 2019 World Athletics Championships, competing in women's 5000 metres.

She competed at the 2020 Summer Olympics. She had shin and knee injuries that kept her off the track for most of 2021, and she did not do much at the 2020 Tokyo Olympics.

Her performance in the 5000 metres in Nijmegen in June 2019, 15:00.61, is a Ugandan national record.

In 2024, she set a Ugandan national record for the 10,000m at the Prefontaine Classic in Eugene with a time of 30:24.04.
