= Peninah Kabenge =

Ugandan sports advocate

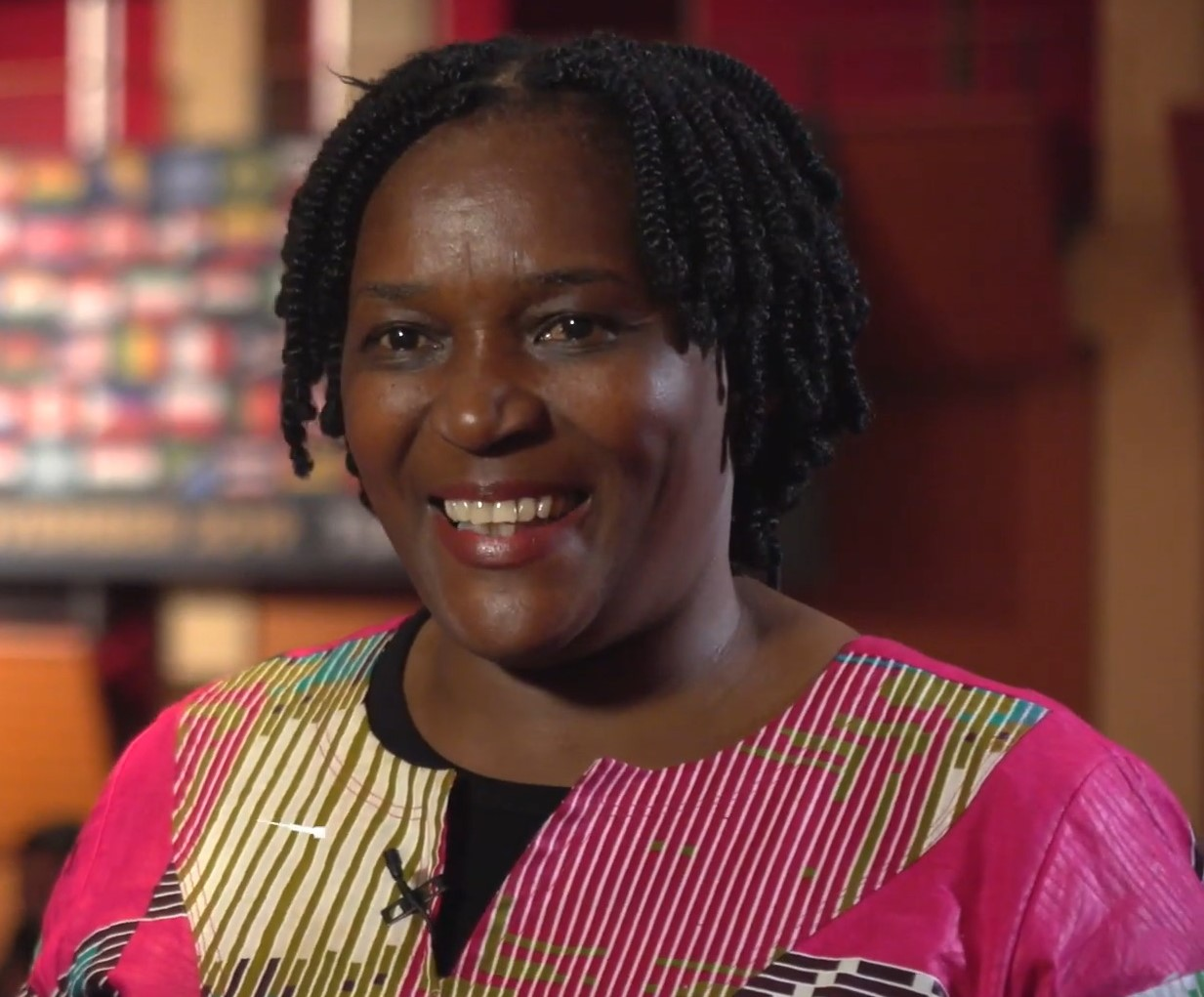
- Kabenge interviewed in 2019
- Born: Peninah Aligawesa Kabenge; November 30, 1964 (age 61); Luwero district, Uganda
- Education: Makerere University
- Occupations: Head of Sports and Recreation
- Known for: Sports advocacy

Peninah Aligawesa Kabenge (born November 30, 1964) is a Ugandan sports advocate. She is the head of sports and recreation at Makerere University, the first female vice president of the International University Sports Federation, and as of 2021 is serving her fifth term as president of the Association of Uganda University Sports.

== Early life ==
Born on 30 November 1964 in Luwero district, Uganda, Kabenge is one of eleven children. Both of her parents were teachers, and she credits them for her teaching ability. She went to Bugema Adventist College for her Ordinary level, and later attended Namasagali College for advanced Level. She attained a bachelor's and master's degree from Makerere University.

== Career ==
=== Sports ===
In 1988, Kabenge got her first job at Makerere University and in 1990 worked as an assistant sports tutor. In 1992-2002, while working as a lecturer in the department of Science and Technical education she was later promoted to the rank of sports tutor at Makerere University. Between 2001 and 2007, Kabenge became lecturer of Sports Psychology at the university and is currently the Head of Sports and Recreation.

In November 2019, Kabenge was voted as the first female vice president of the International University Sports Federation (FISU), elected for a four-year term from 2019 to 2023. As of 2021 she is serving her fifth term as the president of the Association of Uganda University Sports (AUUS), a position she has held since 2004.

Kabenge was also Secretary General of the Uganda Olympic Committee for the years running 2009 - 2012 and the Federation of Africa University Sport for the period running 2011 - 2025.

She also owns a shop that sells sports supplies and clothing.

=== Farming ===
Kabenge owns land in Luwero district where both oranges and mangoes are cultivated. The farm also raises goats.

== Awards ==
In 2012 she was awarded the IOC Women and Sport Award for Africa at the 5th World Conference of Women and Sport. In 2020 she was honoured with a lifetime achievement award by the Federation of Uganda Basketball Associations in recognition of her contributions to basketball.

== Personal life ==
Kabenge is divorced, and has two children.

== See also ==
- Beatrice Ayikoru
- Donald Rukare
