= Marième Boye =

Senegalese sprinter

Personal information
- Nationality: Senegalese
- Born: 7 October 1956 (age 69)

Sport
- Sport: Sprinting
- Event: 100 metres
Medal record
Women's athletics
Representing Senegal
African Championships
| Silver medal – second place | 1979 Dakar | 400 m |
| Silver medal – second place | 1982 Cairo | 200 m |
| Bronze medal – third place | 1979 Dakar | 4×100 m |
| Bronze medal – third place | 1982 Cairo | 400 m |
| Bronze medal – third place | 1982 Cairo | 4×100 m |

Marième Boye (born 7 October 1956) is a Senegalese former sprinter who represented her country in international competitions. She competed in the women's 100 metres at the 1980 Summer Olympics.
