= Dominic Otuchet =

Ugandan teacher and sports administrator (born 1963)

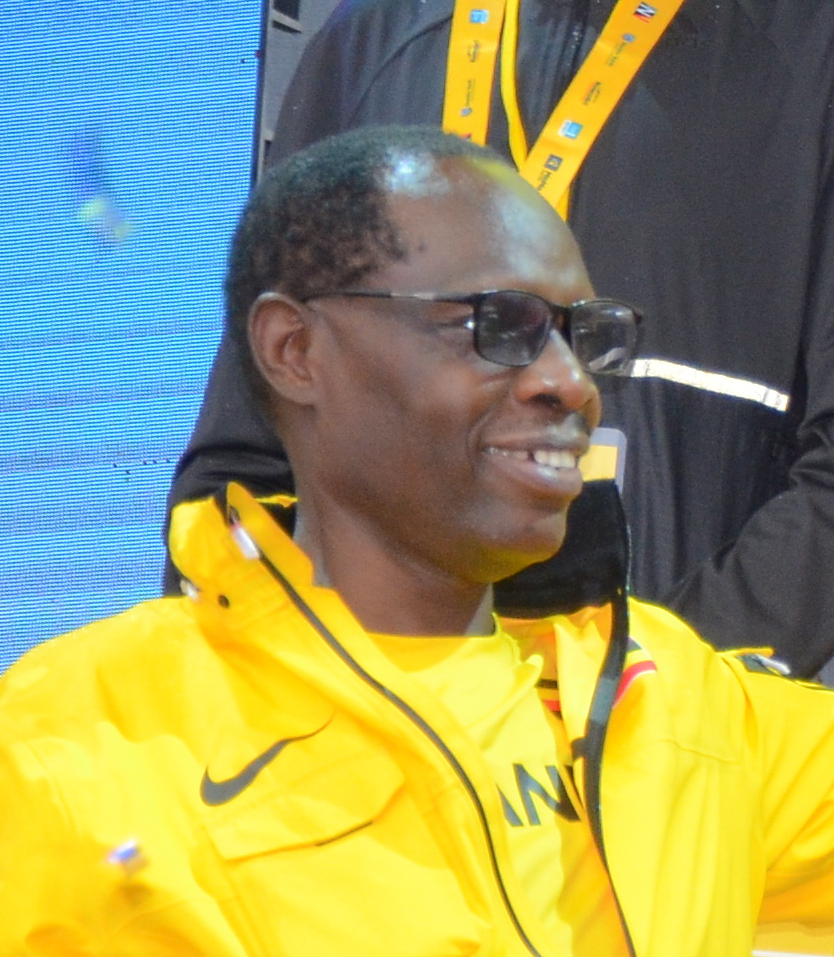
- Born: 28 July 1963 (age 62); Amuria, Uganda
- Citizenship: Uganda
- Education: Bukedi College Kachonga
- Alma mater: Makerere University; Kyambogo University
- Occupations: Teacher and sports administrator
- Known for: President of Uganda Athletics Federation

Dominic Otuchet (born 28 July 1963) is a Ugandan teacher and sports administrator. Since 2010, he has been president of the Uganda Athletics Federation (UAF).

== Early life and education ==
Otuchet was born on 28 July 1963 in Apilac Village, Amuria District. He attended Bukedi College Kachonga, where he specialized in the 400 metres as a runner and later, he went to Makerere College School. Otuchet attended Makerere University and earned a Bachelor of Science in Mathematics & Economics at Makerere University. After his bachelor’s in 1998, he did a postgraduate diploma in teaching at Makerere University, graduating in 2002. He also attended Kyambogo University, where he earned a master of arts in education management.

== Career ==
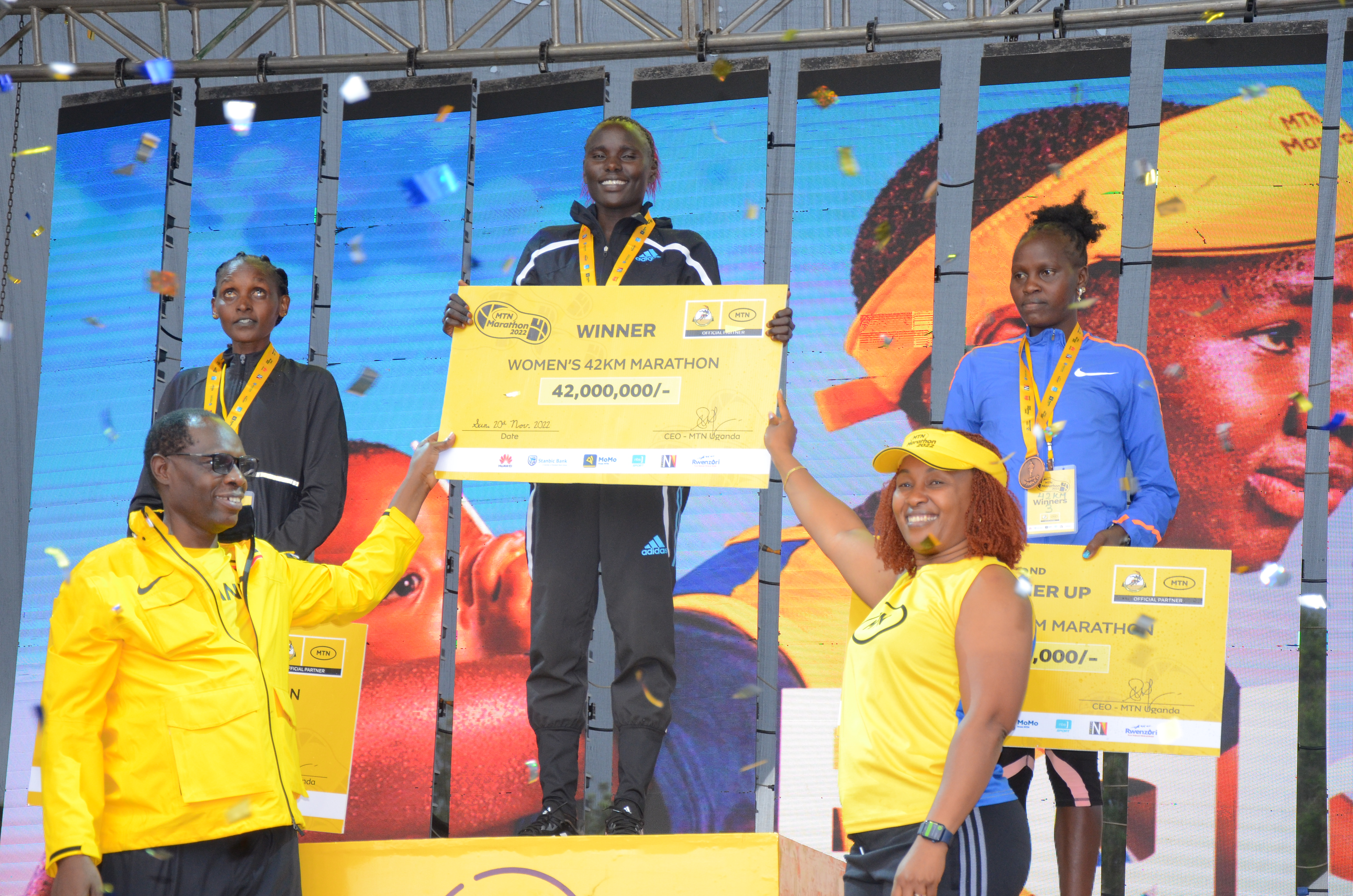
Dominic Otuchet and Sylvia Mulinge award the Kampala MTN Marathon Winner with a cheque.

After university, Otuchet went into teaching. While in his second year, he taught at Bombo Secondary School and later, he became head teacher at Nampunge Community High School, Wakiso District.

In addition, Otuchet has served as treasurer and vice president of the Uganda Athletics Federation. He first became UAF president in 2010, succeeding Daniel Tamwesigire. He was thereafter re-elected in 2014 and 2018, and in January 2022, he was re-elected unopposed to serve another four-year term.

Otuchet is a member of the UAF (Uganda Athletics) Finance Commission.

== Personal life ==
Otuchet is a deacon at Deliverance Church, Kololo and he supports Chelsea Football Club of England.
