= Confederation of African Athletics =

Continental association for the sport of athletics in Africa

- Abbreviation: African Athletics
- Formation: January 17, 1973; 53 years ago
- Type: Sports organisation
- Headquarters: Dakar, Senegal
- Region served: Africa
- Members: 54 national associations
- President: Vacant
- Main organ: African Union Sports Council
- Parent organization: World Athletics
- Website: www.caaweb.org

The Confederation of African Athletics (CAA; French: Confédération Africaine d'Athlétisme) is the continental association for the sport of athletics in Africa. It is headquartered in Dakar, Senegal. It organises the African Championships in Athletics and other continental competitions. From 2003 to May 2026, Hamad Kalkaba Malboum of Cameroon held the position of president.

The organization was founded on 17 January 1973. Before 1992, the organization was known as the Confederation of African Amateur Athletics and sometimes as the African Amateur Athletics Federation.

== Member federations ==
Country	Federation
Northern Region (Sahara)
Algeria	Algerian Athletics Federation
Libya	Libyan Athletics Federation
Morocco	Fédération Royale Marocaine d’Athlétisme
Tunisia	Fédération Tunisienne d'Athlétisme
Western Region (Niger)
Benin	Fédération Béninoise d'Athlétisme Amateur
Burkina Faso	Fédération Burkinabé d'Athlétisme
Cape Verde	Federação Caboverdiana de Atletismo
Côte d'Ivoire	Fédération Ivoirienne d'Athlétisme
Gambia	The Gambia Athletics Association
Ghana	Ghana Athletics Association
Guinea	Fédération Guinéenne d'Athlétisme Amateur
Guinea-Bissau	Federação de Atletismo da Guiné-Bissau (FAGB)
Liberia	Liberia Track and Field Federation
Mali	Fédération Malienne d'Athlétisme Amateur
Mauritania	Fédération d'Athlétisme de la République Islamique de Mauritanie (FAIM)
Niger	Fédération Nigérienne d'Athlétisme
Nigeria	The Athletics Federation of Nigeria
Senegal	Fédération Sénégalaise d'Athlétisme
Sierra Leone	Sierra Leone Amateur Athletic Association
Togo	Fédération Togolaise d'Athlétisme Amateur
Central Region (Congo)
Burundi	Fédération d'Athlétisme du Burundi
Cameroon	Fédération Camerounaise d'Athlétisme
Central African Republic	Fédération Centrafricaine d'Athlétisme
Chad	Fédération Tchadienne d'Athlétisme
Congo, Democratic Republic of the	Fédération d'Athlétisme du Congo
Congo, Republic of the	Fédération Congolaise d'Athlétisme
Equatorial Guinea	Federación Ecuatoguineana de Atletismo
Gabon	Fédération Gabonaise d'Athlétisme
Rwanda	Fédération Rwandaise d'Athlétisme Amateur
São Tomé and Príncipe	Federação Santomense de Atletismo
Eastern Region (Nile)
Djibouti	Fédération Djiboutienne d'Athlétisme
Egypt	Egyptian Athletic Federation
Eritrea	Eritrean National Athletics Federation
Ethiopia	Ethiopian Athletic Federation
Kenya	Athletics Kenya
Somalia	Somali Athletics Federation
South Sudan	South Sudan Athletics Federation
Sudan	Sudan Athletic Association
Tanzania	Tanzania Amateur Athletics Association
Uganda	Uganda Athletics Federation
Southern Region (Kalahari)
Angola	Fédération Angolaise d'Athlétisme
Botswana	Botswana Athletics Association
Comoros	Fédération Comorienne d'Athlétisme
Eswatini	Athletics Eswatini
Lesotho	Lesotho Amateur Athletics Association
Madagascar	Federation Malagasy d'Athletisme
Malawi	Athletics Association of Malawi
Mauritius	Mauritius Amateur Athletic Association
Mozambique	Federação Moçambicana de Atletismo
Namibia	Athletics Namibia
Seychelles	Seychelles Amateur Athletics Federation
South Africa	Athletics South Africa
Zambia	Zambia Amateur Athletic Association
Zimbabwe	National Athletics Association of Zimbabwe

== See also ==
- List of African records in athletics
