= Algerian Athletics Federation =

Governing body for athletics in Algeria

Algerian Athletics Federation AAF
- IOC nation: ALG
- Sport: Athletics

HISTORY
- Year of formation: 1963

AFFILIATIONS
- International federation: World Athletics (WA)
- WA member since: 1963
- Continental association: Confederation of African Athletics
- National Olympic Committee: Algerian Olympic Committee

ELECTED
- President: Yacine Louail
- Address: BP n°61, 16302 Dely Ibrahim, Algiers

The Algerian Athletics Federation (Arabic: الاتحادية الجزائرية لألعاب القوى) is the national governing body for the sport of athletics (including track and field and cross country) in Algeria, recognised by the IAAF and also a member of Confederation of African Athletics. The association is based in Algiers.

== History ==
After Algeria's independence in 1962, the task of structuring Algerian sport was given to Mahmoud Abdoun with the help of Mustapha Agoulmine and Tayeb Mghezzi Chaâ, they founded the Algerian Athletics Federation, of which Mustapha Agoulmine became the first president.

It has been affiliated to the World Athletics called formally the International Association of Athletics Federations since 1963, and since 1974, it has been an active member of the Confederation of African Athletics (CAA) which manages competitions at the continental level. It is also a member of the Arab Athletics Federation.
