= 1982 African Championships in Athletics =

Athletics event in Africa

- Dates: 25–28 August
- Host city: Cairo, Egypt

The 1982 African Championships in Athletics were held in Cairo, Egypt from 25 to 28 August.

== Medal summary ==
=== Men's events ===
Event	Gold		Silver		Bronze	
100 metres	Ernest Obeng; Ghana	10.2 CR	Théophile Nkounkou; Congo	10.2	Boubacar Diallo; Senegal	10.5
200 metres	Boubacar Diallo; Senegal	20.97	Georges Kablan Degnan; Côte d'Ivoire	21.41	Omar Ghizlat; Morocco	21.46
400 metres	Amadou Dia Ba; Senegal	45.8	James Atuti; Kenya	45.9	Mike Okot; Uganda	46.2
800 metres	Juma Ndiwa; Kenya	1:48.10 CR	James Maina; Kenya	1:48.54	Saïd Aouita; Morocco	1:48.80
1500 metres	Kip Cheruiyot; Kenya	3:42.2	Saïd Aouita; Morocco	3:42.2	Wodajo Bulti; Ethiopia	3:42.5
5000 metres	Wodajo Bulti; Ethiopia	13:45.34 CR	Eshetu Tura; Ethiopia	13:50.33	Erastus Kemei; Kenya	13:50.50
10,000 metres	Mohamed Kedir; Ethiopia	28:55.5 CR	Erastus Kemei; Kenya	28:59.3	Ahmed Musa Jouda; Sudan	29:37.0
Marathon	Juma Ikangaa; Tanzania	2:21:05 CR	Djama Robleh; Djibouti	2:31:06	Abdillahi Charmaké; Djibouti	2:39:59
3000 metre steeplechase	Eshetu Tura; Ethiopia	8:30.47 CR	Julius Korir; Kenya	8:32.20	Joshua Kipkemboi; Kenya	8:33.40
110 metres hurdles	Philip Sang; Kenya	13.8 CR	Charles Kokoyo; Kenya	14.2	Hisham Mohamed Makin; Egypt	14.3
400 metres hurdles	Amadou Dia Bâ; Senegal	49.55 CR	Peter Rwamuhanda; Uganda	49.85	Meshak Munyoro; Kenya	51.69
4 × 100 metres relay	Côte d'Ivoire; Amadou Meïté; Otokpa Kouadio; Barthelemy Koffi; Georges Kablan Degnan	40.3	Senegal ? ? ? Mamadou Sène; Boubacar Diallo	40.6	Kenya; John Anzrah; James Atuti; Alfred Nyambane; Moja Shivanda	40.7
4 × 400 metres relay	Kenya; Elisha Bitok; Juma Ndiwa; James Maina Boi; James Atuti	3:05.61 CR	Senegal; Boubacar Diallo; Moussa Fall; Babacar Niang; Amadou Dia Ba	3:05.75	Uganda; Moses Kyeswa; Mike Okot; Peter Rwamuhanda; John Goville	3:06.82
20 kilometre road walk	Shemsu Hassan; Ethiopia	1:41:39	David Munyao; Kenya	1:49:14	Nelsensio Byingingo; Uganda	1:57:02 (NR)
High jump	Moussa Sagna Fall; Senegal	2.20 CR	Boubacar Guèye; Senegal	2.05	Bhaa El Din Bakr; Sudan	2.05
Pole vault	Loué Legbo; Côte d'Ivoire	4.00	Gamal Ramses; Egypt	3.80	Shawki Hassan Abdallah; Egypt	3.50
Long jump	Doudou Ndiaye; Senegal	7.62	Mohamed Kharib Mansour; Egypt	7.51	Moses Kiyai; Kenya	7.47
Triple jump	Mamadou Diallo; Senegal	16.23	Hassan Badra; Egypt	15.50	William Bisereko; Uganda	15.42
Shot put	Youssef Nagui Asaad; Egypt	20.44 CR	Ahmed Kamel Shata; Egypt	18.41	Ahmed Mohamed Ashoush; Egypt	17.89
Discus throw	Mohamed Naguib Hamed; Egypt	59.82 CR	Hassan Ahmed Hamad; Egypt	53.08	Mohamed Fatihi; Morocco	46.94
Hammer throw	Hisham Fouad Greiss; Egypt	60.64 CR	Ahmed Ibrahim Taha; Egypt	57.86	Hisham Abdeslam Zaki; Egypt	55.10
Javelin throw	Zakayo Malekwa; Tanzania	76.18	George Odera; Kenya	71.06	Akram Mohamed Khamis; Egypt	64.24
Decathlon	Charles Kokoyo; Kenya	7080	Patrick Cheruiyot; Kenya	6625	Solomon Kaptich; Kenya	6511

=== Women's events ===
Event	Gold		Silver		Bronze	
100 metres	Alice Adala; Kenya	11.6	Nawal El Moutawakil; Morocco	11.7	Nzaeli Kyomo; Tanzania	11.7
200 metres	Nzaeli Kyomo; Tanzania	23.7	Marième Boye; Senegal	24.5	Ruth Enang; Cameroon	24.6
400 metres	Ruth Atuti; Kenya	54.48	Célestine N'Drin; Côte d'Ivoire	54.58	Marième Boye; Senegal	54.87
800 metres	Evelyn Adiru; Uganda	2:07.00	Célestine N'Drin; Côte d'Ivoire	2:08.20	Mary Chepkemboi; Kenya	2:08.40
1500 metres	Justina Chepchirchir; Kenya	4:22.03	Mary Chepkemboi; Kenya	4:24.58	Linah Cheruiyot; Kenya	4:26.39
3000 metres	Justina Chepchirchir; Kenya	9:20.30	Linah Cheruiyot; Kenya	9:20.80	Hassania Darami; Morocco	9:54.90
100 metres hurdles	Nawal El Moutawakil; Morocco	13.8	Ruth Kyalisima; Uganda	14.0	Chérifa Meskaoui; Morocco	14.0
400 metres hurdles	Nawal El Moutawakil; Morocco	58.42	Ruth Kyalisima; Uganda	59.0	Rose Tata-Muya; Kenya	60.9
4 × 100 metres relay	Kenya; Joyce Odhiambo; Geraldine Shitandayi; Alice Adala; Ruth Atuti	46.77	Côte d'Ivoire; Soungbe Sakanoko; Odette Tape; Seraphine Diambra ?	47.23	Senegal; Marième Boye; Françoise Damado ? ?	50.62
4 × 400 metres relay	Kenya; Selina Chirchir; Ruth Atuti; Mary Chepkemboi; Frida Kiptala	3:43.80	Uganda; Evelyn Adiru; Farida Kyakutema; Ruth Kyalisima; Margaret Komugisha	3:44.90	Morocco; Fatima Aouam; Nawal El Moutawakel; Fatima Salahi; Chaibia Bilali	3:47.40
High jump	Fernande Agnentchoué; Gabon	1.67	Salimata Coulibaly; Côte d'Ivoire	1.67	Lucienne N'Da; Côte d'Ivoire	1.64
Long jump	Jacinta Serete; Kenya	5.37	Ifaf Abdel Fatah Mohamed; Egypt	5.22	Soheir Mohamed Ahmed; Egypt	5.03
Shot put	Odette Mistoul; Gabon	14.21	Souad Malloussi; Morocco	13.74	Herina Malit; Kenya	12.56
Discus throw	Zoubida Laayouni; Morocco	51.50	Helen Alyek; Uganda	42.40	Filomena Silva; Angola	42.20
Javelin throw	Agnès Tchuinté; Cameroon	50.64	Fatiha Belamghar; Morocco	45.86	Eunice Nekesa; Kenya	44.14
Heptathlon	Chérifa Meskaoui; Morocco	5353	Margaret Bisereko; Uganda	5029	Frida Kiptala; Kenya	4808

== Medal table ==
Rank	Nation	Gold	Silver	Bronze	Total
1	Kenya	12	10	12	34
2	Senegal	6	4	3	13
3	Morocco	4	4	6	14
4	Ethiopia	4	1	1	6
5	Egypt	3	7	6	16
6	Tanzania	3	0	1	4
7	Ivory Coast	2	5	1	8
8	Gabon	2	0	0	2
9	Uganda	1	6	4	11
10	Cameroon	1	0	1	2
11	Ghana	1	0	0	1
12	Djibouti	0	1	1	2
13	Congo	0	1	0	1
14	Sudan	0	0	2	2
15	Angola	0	0	1	1
Totals (15 entries)		39	39	39	117

== See also ==
- 1982 in athletics (track and field)
