= Hanan Ahmed Khaled =

Egyptian shot putter (born 1963)

Medal record

Women's athletics

Representing Egypt

African Championships
Gold medal – first place	1988 Annaba	Shot put
Gold medal – first place	1989 Lagos	Shot put
Gold medal – first place	1990 Cairo	Shot put
Gold medal – first place	1996 Yaoundé	Shot put
Silver medal – second place	1988 Annaba	Discus throw
Silver medal – second place	1989 Lagos	Discus throw
Silver medal – second place	1990 Cairo	Discus throw
Silver medal – second place	1992 Belle Vue Harel	Shot put
Bronze medal – third place	1998 Dakar	Shot put
Bronze medal – third place	1998 Dakar	Discus throw

Hanan Ahmed Khaled (Arabic: حنان احمد خالد; born 23 March 1963) is an Egyptian female former track and field athlete, who specialised in the shot put and discus throw events.

She is the most successful female athlete in the history of Egyptian track and field, winning a total of two gold medals in All-Africa Games, four gold, five silver and two bronze medals in African Athletics Championships in discus throw and shot put. She represented her country at the World Championships in Athletics in 1987, 1991 and 1995.

At both the 1988 and 1989 African Championships in Athletics she won the shot put and was runner-up in the discus.

At national level, she won ten shot put titles and eleven discus throw titles, including an undefeated streak in both from 1987 to 1992. She was also her country's first ever hammer throw champion, upon the event's introduction at the national championships in 1998.

She also played football (soccer) and is now a football referee.

== International competitions ==
Year	Competition	Venue	Position	Event	Notes
Representing Egypt
1986	World Junior Championships	Athens, Greece	16th (q)	Shot put	11.07 m
1986	World Junior Championships	Athens, Greece	19th (q)	Discus	32.36 m
1987	All-Africa Games	Nairobi, Kenya	2nd	Discus throw	45.12 m

- Bronze at the 1989 Jeux de la Francophonie in the women's discus throw
- Winner of Discus throw and Shot put in 1991 All-Africa Games
- Gold medal African championship in Shot put 1988, 1989, 1990, 1996
- Silver medal African championship in Shot put 1992, 1996
- Silver medal African championship in Discus throw 1988, 1989, 1990
- Bronze medal African championship in Shot put 1998
- Bronze medal African championship in Discus throw 1998

== See also ==
- List of champions of the African Athletics Championships
- List of Egyptian athletes
