= Ahmed Mohamed Ashoush =

Egyptian athlete

Medal record

Men's athletics

Representing Egypt

African Championships
Gold medal – first place	1984 Rabat	Shot put
Gold medal – first place	1985 Cairo	Shot put
Gold medal – first place	1988 Annaba	Shot put
Bronze medal – third place	1982 Cairo	Shot put

Ahmed Mohamed Ashoush (Arabic: أحمد محمد عشوش) (born 18 November 1955) is an Egyptian former track and field athlete. He competed in the men's shot put at the 1984 Summer Olympics and the 1988 Summer Olympics.

- Three times African champion in shot put, in 1984, 1985 and 1988.
- Won a bronze medal at the 1987 All-Africa Games.

== Achievements ==
Year	Competition	Venue	Position	Event	Notes
Representing Egypt
1982	African Championships	Cairo, Egypt	3rd	Shot put	17.89 m
1984	African Championships	Rabat, Morocco	1st	Shot put	18.45 m
1987	All-Africa Games	Nairobi, Kenya	3rd	Shot put	17.85 m

== See also ==
- List of champions of Africa of athletics
- Egyptian athletes
