= Vincent Ruguga =

Ugandan long-distance runner

Personal information
- Nationality: Uganda
- Born: 12 December 1959 (age 65)
- Height: 1.73 m (5 ft 8 in)
- Weight: 63 kg (139 lb)

Vincent Ruguga (born 12 December 1959) is an Ugandan male long-distance runner. He competed in the marathon event at the 1984 Summer Olympics and 1988 Summer Olympics. His personal best for the marathon is 2h 17' 46", set at the 1990 Boston Marathon.

In 1996, his health began deteriorating. Due to this, Ruguga walked with difficulty and required financial assistance from his brother to pay medical bills.
