= Farida Kyakutema =

Ugandan sprinter

Personal information
- Nationality: Ugandan
- Born: 6 June 1962 (age 64)

Sport
- Sport: Sprinting
- Event: 100 metres
Medal record
Women's athletics
Representing Uganda
African Championships
Gold medal – first place	1988 Annaba	4×400 m
Silver medal – second place	1982 Cairo	4×400 m

Farida Kyakutema (born 6 June 1962) is a Ugandan former sprinter. She competed in the women's 100 metres at the 1988 Summer Olympics. Kyakutema won a bronze medal in the 4 x 100 metres relay at the 1987 All-Africa Games.
