= Hisham Greiss =

Egyptian hammer thrower

Medal record

Men's athletics

Representing Egypt

African Championships
Gold medal – first place	1982 Cairo	Hammer throw
Bronze medal – third place	1979 Dakar	Hammer throw

Hisham Fouad Greiss (Arabic: هشام فؤاد جريس) is a retired male track and field athlete from Egypt who competed in the hammer throw. He is among the few Egyptian athletes who have won gold medals at the African athletic events. Along with his colleagues Nagui Asaad, Hassan Ahmed Hamad and Mohamed Naguib Hamed, Greiss formed one of the strongest Egyptian teams in throw events.

He was twice the winner at the African Championships in Athletics (1979, 1982) and was twice gold medallist at the East and Central African Championships in Athletics (1981, 1982).

Greiss did not compete in the 1976 or 1980 Summer Olympic Games due to boycotts surrounding the games.

== International competitions ==
Year	Competition	Venue	Position	Notes
Representing Egypt
1979	African Championships	Dakar, Senegal	3rd	49.10 m
1982	African Championships	Cairo, Egypt	1st	60.64 m

== See also ==
- List of African Championships in Athletics champions
- List of Egyptians
