= Hassan Ahmed Hamad =

Egyptian discus thrower

Medal record

Men's athletics

Representing Egypt

African Championships
Gold medal – first place	1989 Lagos	Discus throw
Gold medal – first place	1990 Cairo	Discus throw
Silver medal – second place	1982 Cairo	Discus throw
Silver medal – second place	1988 Annaba	Discus throw
Bronze medal – third place	1985 Cairo	Discus throw

Hassan Ahmed Hamad (Arabic: حسن أحمد حماد) is an Egyptian athlete who was a member of the Egyptian athletics team between 1978 and 1992.

He was a member of one of the strongest Egyptian teams in throw events with Nagui Asaad, Hisham Greiss and Mohamed Naguib Hamed. This team is considered the strongest team Egypt ever had by many Egyptian sport experts.

== Achievements ==
- Twice African champion in Discus throw, 1989, 1990.
- Silver medallist African championship in Discus throw, 1988.
- Silver medallist in Discus throw of the 1979 Mediterranean Games
- Bronze medallist African championship in Discus throw, 1985.
- Bronze medallist in Discus throw of the 1987 Mediterranean Games
- Twice Bronze medallist in Discus throw of the All Africa Games, 1987, Nairobi, 1991, Cairo

Year	Competition	Venue	Position	Event	Notes
Representing Egypt
1982	African Championships	Cairo, Egypt	2nd	Discus throw	53.08 m
1987	All-Africa Games	Nairobi, Kenya	3rd	Discus throw	55.84 m

== See also ==
- List of champions of Africa of athletics
- Egyptian athletes
- All-Africa Games
- African Championships in Athletics
- List of Egyptians
