= Mohamed Naguib Hamed =

Egyptian discus thrower (born 1962)

Medal record

Men's athletics

Representing Egypt

African Championships
Gold medal – first place	1982 Cairo	Discus throw
Gold medal – first place	1984 Rabat	Discus throw
Silver medal – second place	1979 Dakar	Discus throw
Silver medal – second place	1985 Cairo	Discus throw
Silver medal – second place	1992 Belle Vue Harel	Discus throw

Mohamed Naguib Hamed (Arabic: محمد نجيب حامد; born September 13, 1962) is an Egyptian athlete and among the very few of his compatriot athletes to win gold medals at African athletic events. He competed in the men's discus throw at the 1984 Summer Olympics and the 1988 Summer Olympics.

Along with his colleagues Nagui Asaad, Hassan Ahmed Hamad, and Hisham Greiss, he formed a strong Egyptian team in throwing events—in fact, a team considered to be the strongest one Egypt has ever had, according to many Egyptian sports experts.

- Twice African champion in Discus Throw: 1982, 1984.
- Silver medallist of the African championship in Discus Throw, 1979.
- Silver medallist in Discus Throw of the 1983 Mediterranean Games.
- Twice Silver medallist in Discus Throw of the All Africa Games: in Nairobi, 1987; Cairo, 1991.
- Four times Gold medallist in Discus Throw of East and Central African Championships: 1981, 1983, 1984, 1985.

With 64.44 metres, he is a former Egyptian recordholder.

== Achievements ==
Year	Competition	Venue	Position	Event	Notes
Representing Egypt
1979	African Championships	Dakar, Senegal	2nd	Discus throw	54.40 m
1982	African Championships	Cairo, Egypt	1st	Discus throw	59.82 m
1983	Mediterranean Games	Casablanca, Morocco	2nd	Discus throw	61.24 m
1984	African Championships	Rabat, Morocco	1st	Discus throw	58.62 m
1987	All-Africa Games	Nairobi, Kenya	2nd	Discus throw	56.08 m
1987	Mediterranean Games	Latakia, Syria	5th	Discus throw	56.88 m
1991	All-Africa Games	Nairobi, Kenya	2nd	Discus throw	55.32 m

== See also ==
- List of champions of Africa of athletics
- Egyptian athletes
- Athletics at the 1987 All-Africa Games
- Athletics at the 1991 All-Africa Games
- List of Egyptians
