= Charles Mbazira =

Ugandan sprinter

Personal information
- Nationality: Ugandan
- Born: 15 May 1958 (age 68)

Sport
- Sport: Sprinting
- Event: 100 metres

Charles Mbazira (born 15 May 1958) is a Ugandan sprinter. He competed in the men's 100 metres at the 1984 Summer Olympics. He won multiple national championships.
