= Egyptian Athletic Federation =

Governing body for the sport of athletics in Egypt

The Egyptian Athletic Federation (Arabic: الاتحاد المصري لألعاب القوى) is the governing body for the sport of athletics in Egypt. It is a member of the Confederation of African Athletics and World Athletics.

The Federation was founded in 1910 and currently based at the Sport Federations Building, Nasr City, Cairo.
