= Mike Okot =

Ugandan sprinter

Medal record

Men's athletics

Representing Uganda

African Championships
Bronze medal – third place	1982 Cairo	400 m
Bronze medal – third place	1982 Cairo	4×400 m

Michael “Mike” Okot (born 25 December 1958) is a retired Ugandan sprinter who specialized in the 400 and 800 metres.

Okot finished seventh in 4 x 400 metres relay at the 1984 Summer Olympics, together with teammates John Goville, Moses Kyeswa and Peter Rwamuhanda, in a national record time of 3:02.09 minutes.

On the individual level, he participated in 400 m at the 1984 Olympics and 4 x 100 metres relay at the 1988 Summer Olympics without reaching the final. He won a bronze medal in the 400 m at the 1982 African Championships, and reached the quarterfinals at the 1983 World Championships. Based in Sweden, he won the Swedish indoor championships in 1988.

== Achievements ==
Year	Competition	Venue	Position	Event	Notes
Representing Uganda
1982	African Championships	Cairo, Egypt	3rd	400 m	46.20s
