= John Goville =

Ugandan sprinter

Medal record

Men's athletics

Representing Uganda

African Championships
Bronze medal – third place	1982 Cairo	4×400 m

John Goville (born 5 January 1962) is a retired Ugandan sprinter who specialized in the 200 and 400 metres.

Govile finished seventh in the 4 x 400 metres relay at the 1984 Summer Olympics, together with teammates Moses Kyeswa, Peter Rwamuhanda and Mike Okot, in a national record time of 3:02.09 minutes.

On the individual level, he participated in the 200 m at the 1984 Olympics and the 400 m at the 1988 Olympics, both times without reaching the final. At the 1988 Olympics he also participated in the 4 x 100 metres relay. He won the East and Central African Championships in 1983 and 1990. In 1984 and 1986 he won the 100 m, 200 m and 400 m events at the Ugandan championships.
