= Moses Kyeswa =

Ugandan sprinter

Medal record

Men's athletics

Representing Uganda

African Championships
Bronze medal – third place	1982 Cairo	4×400 m

Moses Kyeswa (born 12 April 1958) is a retired Ugandan sprinter who specialized in the 400 metres.

Kyeswa finished seventh in the 4 x 400 metres relay at the 1984 Summer Olympics, together with teammates John Goville, Peter Rwamuhanda and Mike Okot, in a national record time of 3:02.09 minutes.

On the individual level, he participated in the 400 m at the 1984 Olympics without reaching the final. He reached the semifinals at the 1983 World Championships. Based in Sweden, he won the Swedish championships in 1986, 1987 and 1988.
