= Ahmed Kamel Shatta =

Personal information
- Born: 27 January 1961
- Died: 4 May 2016 (aged 55)

Sport
- Sport: Track and field
Medal record
Representing Egypt
African Championships
Silver medal – second place	1982 Cairo	Shot put
Silver medal – second place	1984 Rabat	Shot put
Silver medal – second place	1985 Cairo	Shot put
Silver medal – second place	1988 Annaba	Shot put
Silver medal – second place	1990 Cairo	Shot put

Ahmed Muhammad Kamel Shatta (Arabic: أحمد كامل شطة, 27 January 1961 – 4 May 2016) was an Egyptian former track and field athlete who represented Egypt in shot put, winning five silver medals in shot put at the African Championships in Athletics. He died on 4 May 2016 in Dubai, UAE (aged 55).

== Biography ==
He also represented Egypt in 1984 and 1988 Summer Olympics. His personal best is 20.76 metres scored in 1988.

== Achievements ==
Year	Tournament	Venue	Result	Event
1982	African Championship	Cairo, Egypt	2nd	Shot Put
1984	African Championship	Rabat, Morocco	2nd	Shot Put
1985	African Championship	Cairo, Egypt	2nd	Shot Put
1988	African Championship	Annaba, Algeria	2nd	Shot Put
1990	African Championship	Cairo, Egypt	2nd	Shot Put
