= Ruth Kyalisima =

Ugandan sprinter

Personal information
- Nationality: Ugandan
- Born: 21 November 1955 (age 70)

Sport
- Sport: Sprinting
- Event: 4 × 100 metres relay
Medal record
Women's athletics
Representing Uganda
African Championships
Gold medal – first place	1988 Annaba	4×400 m
Silver medal – second place	1982 Cairo	100 m hurdles
Silver medal – second place	1982 Cairo	400 m hurdles
Silver medal – second place	1982 Cairo	4×400 m
Silver medal – second place	1988 Annaba	400 m hurdles
Bronze medal – third place	1979 Dakar	400 m hurdles

Ruth Kyalisima (born 21 November 1955) is a Ugandan former sprinter. She competed in the women's 400 metres hurdles at the 1984 Summer Olympics and in the women's 4 × 100 metres relay at the 1988 Summer Olympics.
