= Uganda Athletics Federation =

Governing body for athletics in Uganda

- Sport: Athletics
- Jurisdiction: Uganda
- Founded: 4 April 1925
- Headquarters: Kampala, Uganda
- President: Domenic Otuchet
- Secretary: Beatrice Ayikoru

Uganda Athletic Federation (UAF) is a World Athletics recognised member officially representing Uganda as the national governing body for the sport of Athletics.

== Establishment ==
The idea of making the body called Uganda Athletes(UA) came back in early 1900s by starting annual athletics competition at Maj.Lawrence's home in Nakasero through informal meeting not until 4 April 1925 that group of notable sport men convened the meeting at today's known Imperial Hotel in Kampala to fully start the body.

== History ==
Uganda achieved their first Olympic gold medal when John Akii-Bua took the 400 metres hurdles, setting a new world record. Dorcus Inzikuru was the winner of the first Women's 3000 metres steeplechase world championship. Stephen Kiprotich won the Olympic gold medal in the marathon and won the World Championship in marathon the following year.

As of 2022, Domenic Otuchet (also spelled Dominic Otuchet, among other spelling variants) was elected the president of the federation.

The body is run by a group of notable people in the World's athletic competition including Ms. Beatrice Ayikoru (General Secretary) and other members of the board.

== See also ==
- Dominec Otuchet
- Beatrice Ayikoru
