= Peter Rwamuhanda =

Ugandan hurdler

Medal record

Men's athletics

Representing Uganda

African Championships
Silver medal – second place	1982 Cairo	400 m hurdles
Bronze medal – third place	1982 Cairo	4×400 m

Peter Keneth Rwamuhanda (11 December 1953 – 9 June 2008) was a Ugandan athlete who competed in the 400 metres hurdles. In the same event, he won silver medals at the 1982 Commonwealth Games, the 1982 African Championships and a bronze at the 1978 All-Africa Games.

== Achievements ==
Year	Competition	Venue	Position	Event	Notes
Representing Uganda
1978	All-Africa Games	Algiers, Algeria	3rd	400 m hurdles	50.18
1982	African Championships	Cairo, Egypt	2nd	400 m hurdles	49.85

- 1984 Olympic Games - seventh place (4x400 metres relay)
- 1982 Commonwealth Games - silver medal
- 1982 East and Central African Championships - gold medal
- 1976 East and Central African Championships - gold medal
