= List of flag bearers for Uganda at the Olympics =

Uganda at the Olympics
- IOC code: UGA
- NOC: Uganda Olympic Committee
- Website: www.nocuganda.com
- Medals: Gold 5 Silver 5 Bronze 3 Total 13

Summer appearances
- 1956; 1960; 1964; 1968; 1972; 1976; 1980; 1984; 1988; 1992; 1996; 2000; 2004; 2008; 2012; 2016; 2020; 2024

This is a list of flag bearers who have represented Uganda at the Olympics.

Flag bearers carry the national flag of their country at the opening ceremony of the Olympic Games.

#	Event year	Season	Flag bearer	Sport
1	1972	Summer	John Akii-Bua	Athletics
2	1984	Summer	Ruth Kyalisima	Athletics
3	1988	Summer	Patrick Lihanda	Boxing
4	1992	Summer	Fred Muteweta	Boxing
5	1996	Summer	Mary Musoke	Table tennis
6	2000	Summer	Sunday Kizito	Boxing
7	2004	Summer	Joseph Lubega	Boxing
8	2008	Summer	Ronald Serugo	Boxing
9	2012	Summer	Ganzi Mugula	Swimming
10	2016	Summer	Joshua Tibatemwa	Swimming
11	2020	Summer	Shadiri Bwogi	Boxing
11	2020	Summer	Kirabo Namutebi	Swimming
12	2024	Summer	Charles Kagimu	Cycling
12	2024	Summer	Gloria Muzito	Swimming

== See also ==
- Uganda at the Olympics
