= Uganda at the 1964 Summer Olympics =

- IOC code: UGA
- NOC: Uganda Olympic Committee

in Tokyo
- Competitors: 13 in 2 sports
- Medals: Gold 0 Silver 0 Bronze 0 Total 0

Summer Olympics appearances (overview)
- 1956; 1960; 1964; 1968; 1972; 1976; 1980; 1984; 1988; 1992; 1996; 2000; 2004; 2008; 2012; 2016; 2020; 2024; 2028

Uganda competed at the 1964 Summer Olympics in Tokyo, Japan. It was the first Summer Olympics where Uganda debuted as an independent nation. During this campaign Uganda as a nation presented their first female Olympians, Irene Muyanga and Mary Musani. Uganda made its first step in Olympic history though it didn't win medals. The 1964 Games marked Uganda's entry into the global Olympic stage, establishing its National Olympic Committee's participation, with future successes in athletics and boxing to follow in later Games.

== Athletics ==
Men

- Men competed in events like the 100m (James Odongo), 200m (Sam Amukun, Aggrey Awori), 400m (Amos Omolo), 400m hurdles (Jorem Ochana), and relays.

Track & road events

Athlete	Event	Heat		Quarterfinal		Semifinal		Final	
Athlete	Event	Result	Rank	Result	Rank	Result	Rank	Result	Rank
Sam Amukun	200 m	21.5	5	did not advance					
Aggrey Awori	200 m	22.2	7	did not advance					
Aggrey Awori	110 m hurdles	14.6	5	did not advance					
Jorem Ochana	400 m hurdles	52.4	4	did not advance					
James Odongo	100 m	10.9	4	did not advance					
Virgil Okiring	110 m hurdles	15.5	7	did not advance					
Amos Omolo	400 m	47.6	5	did not advance					
Aggrey Awori; Sam Amukun; James Odongo; Amos Omolo	4 × 100 m relay	41.4	6	did not advance					

Women

- Irene Muyanga ran the 100m and 200m, while Mary Musani competed in the 80m hurdles.

Track & road events

Athlete	Event	Heat		Quarterfinal		Semifinal		Final	
Athlete	Event	Result	Rank	Result	Rank	Result	Rank	Result	Rank
Irene Muyanga	100 m	12.0	5 Q	12.2	7	did not advance			
Irene Muyanga	200 m	27.6	5	did not advance					
Mary Musani	80 m hurdles	12.9	7	did not advance					

== Boxing ==
Men

- Alex Odhiambo (Lightweight) and Ernest Mabwa (Welterweight) represented Uganda, with Odhiambo winning a couple of bouts before losing in the quarter-finals.

Athlete	Event	1 Round	2 Round	3 Round	Quarterfinals	Semifinals	Final
Athlete	Event	Opposition Result	Opposition Result	Opposition Result	Opposition Result	Opposition Result	Rank
Alex Odhiambo	Lightweight	Chin Hong You (CAM); W RSC-1	Mario Serrano (MEX); W 5-0	János Kajdi (HUN); L 0-5	did not advance		
Ernest Mabwa	Welterweight	—N/a	Maurice Frilot (USA); W 5-0	Constantin Niculescu (ROU); W 3-2	Ričardas Tamulis (URS); L 0-5	did not advance	5
Peter P. Odhiambo	Middleweight	—N/a	Jacoues Marty (FRA); W 5-0	Ahmed Hassan (EGY); L 0-5	did not advance		
Henry Mugwanya	Light Heavyweight	—N/a	Jurgen Schlegel (EUA); L 0-5	did not advance			
George Oywello	Heavyweight	—N/a		Joe Frazier (USA); L RSC-1	did not advance		

== See also ==
- Uganda at the 1968 Summer Olympics
- Uganda at the 1972 Summer Olympics
- Uganda at the 1980 Summer Olympics
- Uganda at the 1984 Summer Olympics
- Uganda at the 1988 Summer Olympics
