= Uganda at the 2016 Summer Olympics =

- IOC code: UGA
- NOC: Uganda Olympic Committee
- Website: www.nocuganda.com

in Rio de Janeiro
- Competitors: 21 in 3 sports
- Flag bearer: Joshua Tibatemwa
- Medals: Gold 0 Silver 0 Bronze 0 Total 0

Summer Olympics appearances (overview)
- 1956; 1960; 1964; 1968; 1972; 1976; 1980; 1984; 1988; 1992; 1996; 2000; 2004; 2008; 2012; 2016; 2020; 2024

Uganda competed at the 2016 Summer Olympics in Rio de Janeiro, Brazil, from 5 to 21 August 2016. Since the nation's official debut in 1956, Ugandan athletes have appeared in every edition of the Summer Olympic Games, with the exception of the 1976 Summer Olympics in Montreal because of its partial support of the African boycott.

The Uganda Olympic Committee fielded a team of 21 athletes, 14 men and 7 women, to compete only in athletics, boxing, and swimming at the games. It was the nation's largest delegation sent to the Olympics since 1988, eclipsing the record of 15 athletes who attended the London games four years earlier. About 80 percent of Uganda's full roster competed in athletics, particularly those who specialized in long-distance running and the marathon.

The Ugandan roster featured six returning Olympians, although only four of them competed in London in 2012: defending marathon champion Stephen Kiprotich, swimmer Jamila Lunkuse, and the steeplechase tandem of Jacob Araptany and Benjamin Kiplagat, who headed to his third games as the most experienced member. Meanwhile, Sweden-based boxers Ronald Serugo (men's flyweight) and Kennedy Katende (men's light heavyweight) staged their Olympic comeback in Rio de Janeiro after eight years of absence.

Other notable athletes on the Ugandan team were Solomon Mutai who won a bronze medal in the men's marathon at the 2015 World Championships in Beijing; 15-year-old distance runner Jacob Kiplimo (men's 5000 metres); and US-based freestyle swimmer Joshua Tibatemwa, who was the nation's flag bearer in the opening ceremony.

Uganda, however, left Rio de Janeiro without a medal, in contrast to the previous Games. Distance runner Joshua Kiprui Cheptegei produced the most successful outcome for Uganda, finishing eighth in the men's 5,000 metres and sixth with a personal best in the men's 10,000 metres. The nation's most celebrated athlete, Kiprotich, failed to retain his marathon title, slipping to a fourteenth-place finish in Rio de Janeiro.

== Athletics ==
Ugandan athletes achieved qualifying standards in the following athletics events (up to a maximum of 3 athletes in each event):

A total of 17 athletes (11 men and 6 women), highlighted by defending Olympic marathon champion Kiprotich, were named as part of Uganda's official team announcement for the Games on 15 July 2016.

Key

- Note–Ranks given for track events are within the athlete's heat only
- Q = Qualified for the next round
- q = Qualified for the next round as a fastest loser or, in field events, by position without achieving the qualifying target
- PB = Personal best
- SB = Season's best
- NR = National record
- N/A = Round not applicable for the event
- Bye = Athlete not required to compete in round

Track & road events
Men

Athlete	Event	Heat		Semifinal		Final	
Athlete	Event	Result	Rank	Result	Rank	Result	Rank
Ronald Musagala	1500 m	3:38.45	4 Q	3:40.37	5 Q	3:51.68	11
Joshua Kiprui Cheptegei	5000 m	13:25.70	4 Q	—		13:09.17	8
Jacob Kiplimo	5000 m	13:30.40	11	—		Did not advance	
Phillip Kipyego	5000 m	13:24.66 SB	11	—		Did not advance	
Joshua Kiprui Cheptegei	10000 m	—				27:10.06 PB	6
Moses Kurong	10000 m	—				28:03.38	22
Timothy Toroitich	10000 m	—				28:04.84	23
Jacob Araptany	3000 m steeplechase	8:21.53	2 Q	—		DNF	
Benjamin Kiplagat	3000 m steeplechase	8:30.76	6	—		Did not advance	
Jackson Kiprop	Marathon	—				2:22:09	80
Stephen Kiprotich	Marathon	—				2:13:32	14
Solomon Mutai	Marathon	—				2:11:49	8

Women

Athlete	Event	Heat		Semifinal		Final	
Athlete	Event	Result	Rank	Result	Rank	Result	Rank
Halimah Nakaayi	800 m	1:59.78 PB	5 q	2:00.63	6	Did not advance	
Winnie Nanyondo	800 m	2:02.77	6	Did not advance			
Juliet Chekwel	5000 m	15:29.07	9	—		Did not advance	
Stella Chesang	5000 m	15:49.80	13	—		Did not advance	
Juliet Chekwel	10000 m	—				DNF	
Peruth Chemutai	3000 m steeplechase	9:31.03 PB	7	—		Did not advance	
Nyakisi Adero	Marathon	—				2:42:39	68

== Boxing ==
Uganda entered two boxers to compete in each of the following weight classes in the Olympic boxing tournament. 2008 Olympians Ronald Serugo and Kennedy Katende, who previously competed for Sweden, had claimed Olympic spots as a result of their box-off triumphs at the 2016 African Qualification Tournament in Yaoundé, Cameroon.

Athlete	Event	Round of 32	Round of 16	Quarterfinals	Semifinals	Final	
Athlete	Event	Opposition Result	Opposition Result	Opposition Result	Opposition Result	Opposition Result	Rank
Ronald Serugo	Men's flyweight	Abgaryan (ARM); L 1–2	Did not advance				
Kennedy Katende	Men's light heavyweight	Buatsi (GBR); L TKO	Did not advance				

== Swimming ==
Uganda received a Universality invitation from FINA to send two swimmers (one male and one female) to the Olympics.

Athlete	Event	Heat		Semifinal		Final	
Athlete	Event	Time	Rank	Time	Rank	Time	Rank
Joshua Tibatemwa	Men's 50 m freestyle	25.98	64	Did not advance			
Jamila Lunkuse	Women's 100 m breaststroke	1:19.64	40	Did not advance			
