= Uganda at the 2012 Summer Olympics =

- IOC code: UGA
- NOC: Uganda Olympic Committee
- Website: www.nocuganda.com

in London
- Competitors: 15 in 4 sports
- Flag bearer: Ganzi Mugula
- Medals Ranked 50th: Gold 1 Silver 0 Bronze 0 Total 1

Summer Olympics appearances (overview)
- 1956; 1960; 1964; 1968; 1972; 1976; 1980; 1984; 1988; 1992; 1996; 2000; 2004; 2008; 2012; 2016; 2020; 2024

Uganda competed at the 2012 Summer Olympics in London, which was held from 27 July to 12 August 2012. The country's participation there marked its 13th appearance in the Summer Olympics since its début at the 1956 Summer Olympics. The delegation consisted of eleven track and field athletes that included Moses Ndiema Kipsiro, Benjamin Kiplagat, and Stephen Kiprotich, one each in badminton and weightlifting (Edwin Ekiring and Charles Ssekyaaya), and two swimmers (Ganzi Mugula and Jamila Lunkuse). Ekiring, Ssekyaaya, Mugula, and Lunkuse had qualified through wildcard places, while the rest of the delegation satisfied the Games' qualification standards for their respective events. Mugula was selected as the team captain. Mugula was also selected as the flag bearer for both the opening and closing ceremonies. The country's best result at these Games was a gold medal for Kiproitch in the men's marathon, its first such medal since the 1972 Munich Olympics.

== Background ==
Uganda participated in thirteen Olympic Games between its début at the 1956 Summer Olympics in Melbourne, Australia and the 2012 Summer Olympics in London, missing only the 1976 Summer Olympics in Montreal, because of a boycott relating to the New Zealand national rugby union team touring South Africa. Seven Ugandan athletes have won medals at the Summer Olympic Games. Uganda would participate in the London Summer Olympics from 27 July to 12 August 2012.

The delegation consisted of athletics competitors Jacob Araptany, Benjamin Kiplagat, Thomas Ayeko, Abraham Kiplimo, Geofrey Kusuro, Julius Mutekanga, Stephen Kiprotich, Moses Kipsiro, Janet Achola, Dorcus Inzikuru and Jane Suuto, badminton player Edwin Ekiring, swimmers Ganzi Mugula and Jamila Lunkuse and weightlifter Charles Ssekyaaya. It was led by its vice-president Edward Ssekandi, and the Uganda Olympic Committee technical vice-president Dennis Galabuzi who served as their chef de mission to help increase morale among the athletes. For the first time since 1956, Uganda did not qualify athletes in boxing. Mugula was selected as the flag bearer for both the opening and closing ceremonies. Middle-distance runner Annet Negesa was due to compete in the women's 800 metres but withdrew due to an Achilles tendon injury.

== Medallists ==
| Medal | Name | Sport | Event | Date |
|---|---|---|---|---|
| Gold | Stephen Kiprotich | Athletics | Men's marathon | 12 August |

== Athletics ==
=== Men ===
==== 800 metres ====
Competing at his first Olympic Games, Julius Mutekanga qualified for the London Games via qualification standards because his fastest time of 1 minute, 46.30 seconds, recorded at the 2011 Ninove Memorial Geert Rasschaert, met the "B" qualifying standard for the men's 800 metres. In an interview with New York Press before the Games he said he promised to ensure that he would make the best of his participation: "When you’re running, you’re looking at improving your personal best time, so it doesn’t matter whether you win or not. As long as you’re running faster and faster, that’s the ultimate goal." Mutekanga took part in the first round's seventh heat on 6 August, finishing fifth out of eight athletes, with a time of 1 minute, 48.41 seconds. Overall he finished 35th out of 52 athletes, (Note: Three athletes were disqualified, and one did not start.) and was 2.06 seconds behind the slowest competitor in his heat who advanced to the semi-final and, therefore, that was the end of his competition.

==== 3000 metres steeplechase ====
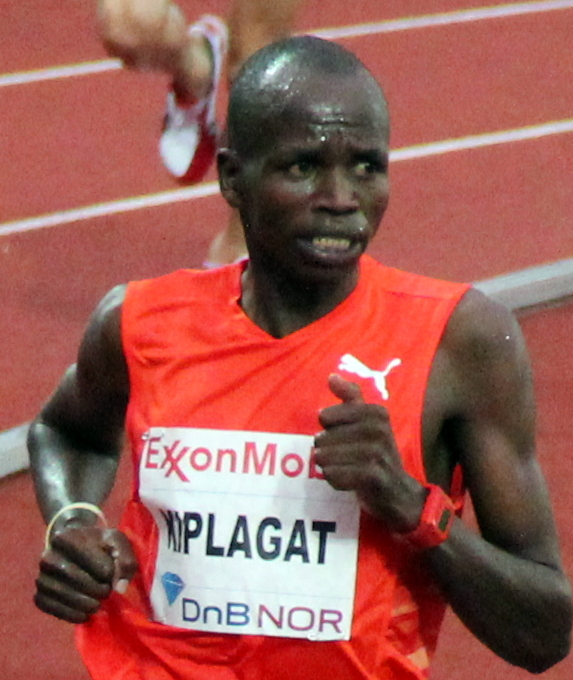
Benjamin Kiplagat (pictured in 2011) was disqualified from the 3000 metres steeplechase final for moving to the track's inside line.

Jacob Araptany was the youngest competitor to represent Uganda in the athletics discipline at the London Olympics, aged 18. He had not participated in any previous Olympic Games. Araptany had intended to take part in the men's 1500 metres and the men's 3000 metres steeplechase, but after consultation with the Ugandan coach, he elected to participate in the latter event because of the close time frame between the two events. He qualified for the Games because his fastest time of 8 minutes, 14.48 seconds, set at the 2011 Golden Gala, exceeded the required "A" standard entry time. He was drawn in the second heat on 3 August, finishing seventh out of twelve runners, with a time of 8 minutes, 35.85 seconds. Araptany finished 25th out of 37 competitors overall, (Note: Two runners, Víctor García and Birhan Getahun, did not finish.) and failed to go through to the final because his time was 6.73 slower than the slowest runner in his heat who made the later stages.

At the age of 23, Benjamin Kiplagat was competing in his second Olympic Games. Like Araptany he qualified for the men's 3000 metres steeplechase because his best time of 8 minutes, 3.81 seconds, recorded at the 2010 Athletissima, met the "A" qualifying standard. Kiplagat said that he wanted to finish in a podium position in the event and revealed that he was not worried about wet-weather conditions affecting his performance. He took part in the event's first heat on 3 August, finishing sixth out of 13 runners, with a time of 8 minutes, 18.44 seconds. Kiglagat led early on although he stumbled over the steeple in the penultimate lap but was able to regain his balance and finished at a slower pace. Nevertheless, his time allowed him to qualify for the final. In the final, held two days later, Kiplagat fell and injured his knee after he was reportedly pushed by another athlete, and moved to the inside line while changing his tactics to stay away from the lead pack. He was initially recorded as finishing 14th out of 15 runners with a time of 8 minutes, 47.85 seconds, but was disqualified for his inside line change.

==== 5000 metres ====
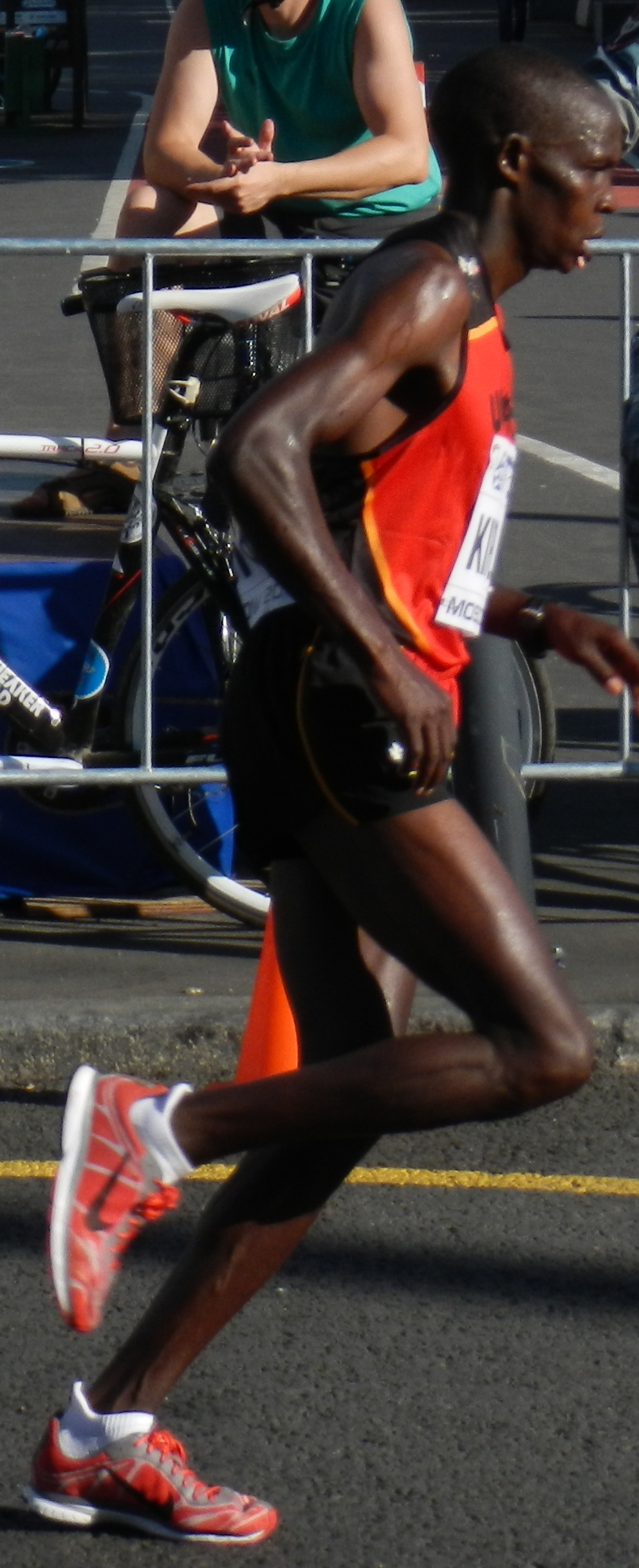
Abraham Kiplimo (pictured in 2013) was eliminated in the first round of the 5000 metres.

Geoffrey Kusuro's participation in the London Olympic Games marked his début in the quadrennial event at the age of 23. He attained qualification to the Games because his fastest time of 13 minutes, 12.32 seconds, set at the 2011 Míting Internacional d´Atletisme Ciutat de Barcelona, exceeded the "A" qualifying standard for the men's 5000 metres. Kusuro was drawn in the first heat of the event on 8 August, finishing 18th out of 20 athletes, with a time of 13 minutes, 59.74 seconds. Overall he finished 38th out of 42 runners, (Note: One competitor, Teklemariam Medhin, did not start.) and did not qualify for the final because his time was 33.58 seconds behind the slowest qualifier.

At the time of the 2012 London Summer Games Abraham Kiplimo was 23 years old and was making his first appearance in the quadrennial event. He obtained qualification to the Games because his fastest time, set at the 2011 Míting Internacional d´Atletisme Ciutat de Barcelona, of 13 minutes, 10.40 seconds was within the "A" qualifying standard. Kiplimo took part in the event's second heat on 8 August, finishing 15th out of 21 competitors, with a time of 13 minutes, 31.57 seconds. He finished 24th out of 42 athletes overall, and was 5.41 seconds slower than the slowest runner who progressed to the final and was eliminated from contention.

Moses Kipsiro was the only runner in the men's 5000 metres to have competed at the 2008 Summer Olympics in Beijing. He qualified for the Games because his best time of 12 minutes and 59.27 seconds, set at the 2009 Weltklasse Zürich, was 20.73 seconds faster than the "A" qualifying standard for this event. Three months before the Games started Kipsiro stated that he took the year the Olympics were held as "special" and was motivated for the event. He participated in the second heat on 8 August, finishing seventh out of 21 runners, with a time of 13 minutes, 17.68 seconds, qualifying him for the final. In the final, Kipsiro finished 15th (and last), with a time of 13 minutes, 52.25 seconds and was 10.59 seconds behind the gold medallist Mo Farah of Great Britain (13 minutes, 41.66 seconds).

==== 10,000 metres ====
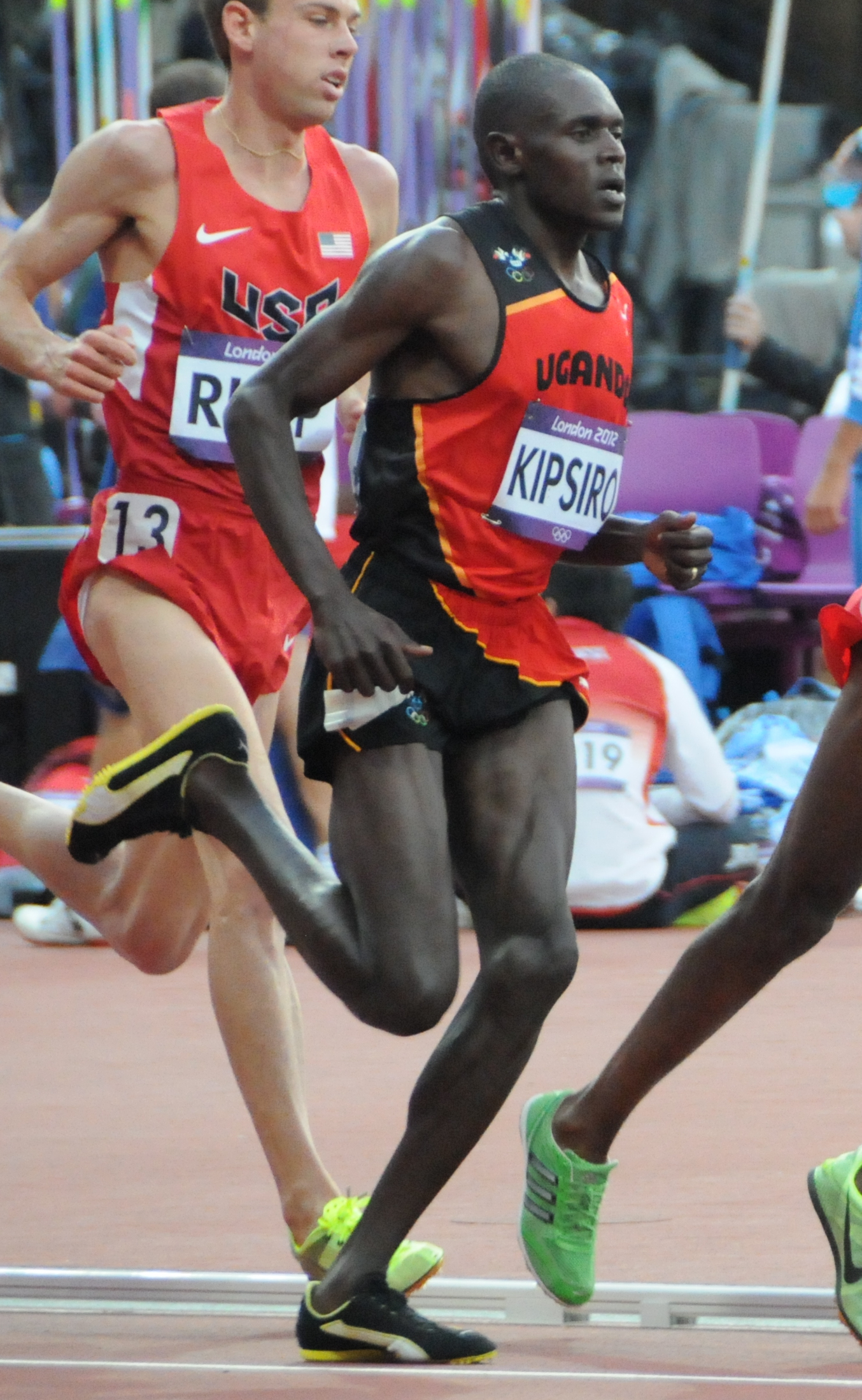
Moses Kipsiro finished tenth in the 10,000 metres.

Kipsiro also entered the men's 10,000 metres in his Olympic debut in the discipline. He qualified for the event by setting a fastest time of 27 minutes, 4.48 seconds at the 2012 British Athletics Grand Prix which was 40.52 seconds quicker than the "A" qualification standard. In the race, held on 4 August, he stumbled and fell onto the track surface after seven minutes and 36 seconds. His foot was stepped on by another competitor while running in the middle of the pack with Kipsiro sustaining a bruised right hand, and felt pain in his shoulders. Kipsiro was able to continue and finished tenth out of 26 athletes overall, (Note: Three athletes were unable to finish the race.) with a time of 27 minutes, 39.22 seconds. He finished 8.80 seconds behind the gold medallist Farah of Great Britain.

Thomas Ayeko, at the age of 20, was making his first appearance at the Olympic Games. He was able to qualify for the Games by recording a time of 27 minutes and 43.22 seconds at the 2012 British Athletics Grand Prix which was 4.03 seconds faster than the required "A" qualifying standard for the 10,000 metres. In the event, he finished 16th with a time of 27 minutes and 58.96 seconds. He finished 28.54 second behind Farah. Ayeko stated post-race he was carrying an injury and called the event "tough".

==== Men's marathon ====
Stephen Kiprotich was 23 years old at the time of the London Games and it was the first time he had competed in the quadrennial event. He was able to qualify for the Games because his fastest time, set at the 2011 Tokyo Marathon, of 2 hours, 7 minutes, 20 seconds, was faster than the required "A" standard qualifying entry time for the men's marathon. In preparation for the marathon Kiprotich spent time training in Kenya's Rift Valley Province alongside long-distance runner Eliud Kipchoge. In the event Kenya's Wilson Kipsang was the early leader but it was reduced when he missed a drinks stop. Kiprotich gained on Kipsang and also joined Abel Kirui in a group of three runners until his Kenyan rivals established a small gap. He had held his leg as the gap between himself and the first two runners grew. Kiportich gained the lead after using a large amount of energy leaving a turn on the course and built a 200 m (660 ft) lead which he held to win the marathon. He finished with a time of 2 hours, 8 minutes, 1 second. and his victory was considered by the media and many people as "surprising" as he had not been expected to win. It was the second time Uganda had won a gold medal at the Summer Olympics, the first since John Akii-Bua won the 400 metres hurdles at the 1972 Munich Olympics, and the seventh in the nation's history.

=== Women ===
Competing at her first Olympic Games at the age of 24, Janet Achola earned qualification into the Games by posting a time of 4 minutes, 5.52 seconds, at the 2012 Fanny Blankers-Koen Games on 30 May, which was 0.48 seconds quicker than the "A" qualifying standard forwomen's 1500 metres. She said the training that she received from coach allowed her to achieve success and set herself the objective of securing her first medal at an international event. Overall she finished 22nd out of 44 competitors, (Note: Two competitors did not start, and one was unable to finish.) and was 3.81 seconds slower than the two slowest athletes who progressed to the semi-finals and, therefore, that was the end of her competition.

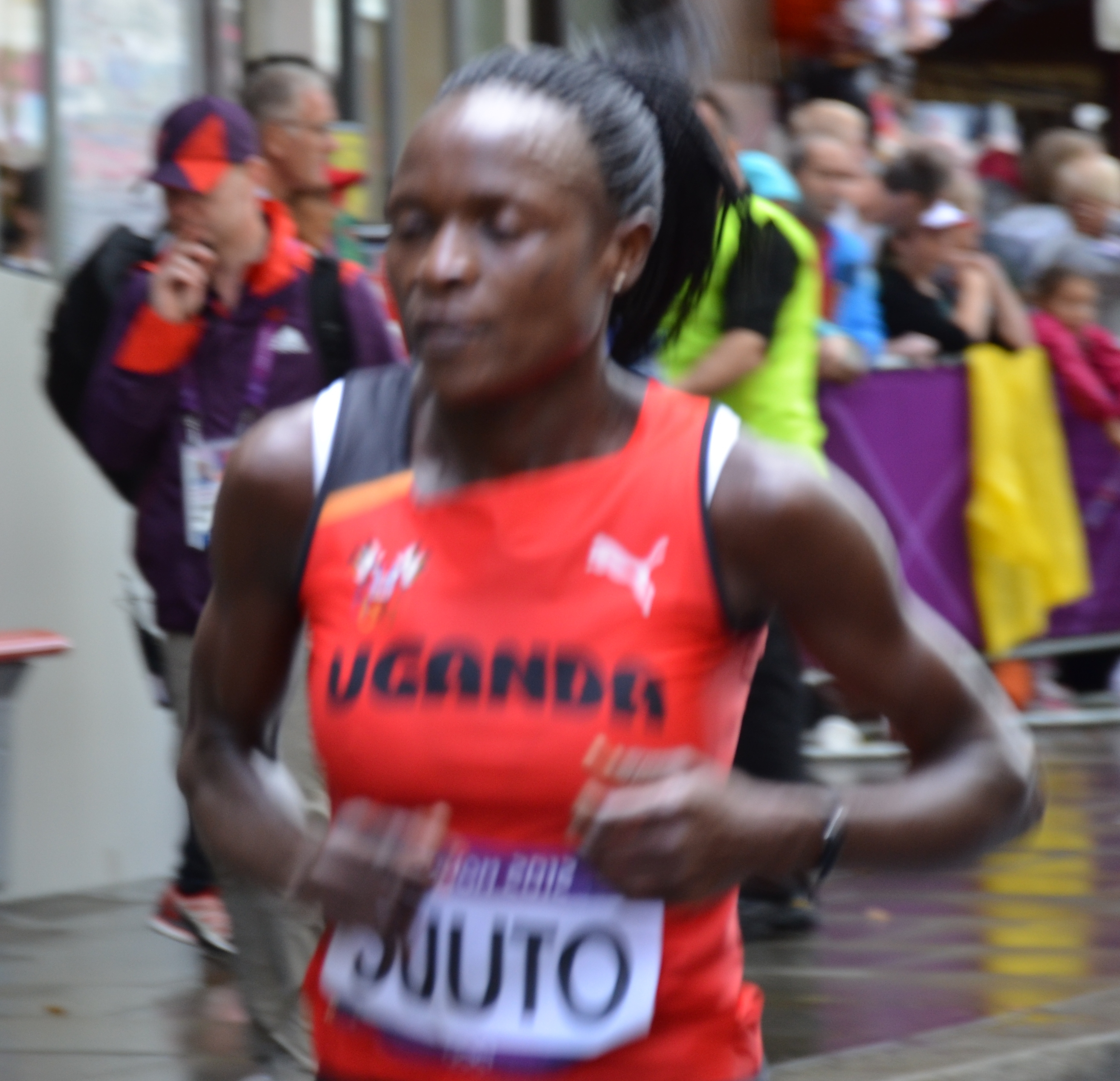
Jane Suuto competing in the women's marathon.

Dorcus Inzikuru was one of the oldest athletes to compete for Uganda at the London Olympic Games at the age of 30. She was the only one of the team's athletes to have taken part in the 2004 Summer Olympics in Athens. Inzikuru gained qualification into the London Games by winning the 3,000 metres steeplechase race at the 2012 International Athletics Bottrop Gala, with a time of 9 minutes, 30.95 seconds, which was 12.05 seconds faster than the "A" qualifying standard for the women's 3000 metres steeplechase, and was the last Ugandan athlete to obtain qualification. To prepare herself for the Games she trained in Iten, Kenya. Inzikuru said that if she performed well at the Games it would allowed her to participate in European events after finding it difficult to obtain visa to travel to the continent but did not promise any medals. She was placed in the third heat on 4 August, finishing seventh out of 14 runners, with a time of 9 minutes, 35.29 seconds. She finished 20th out of 44 runners overall, (Note: Three athletes in the heat stage were disqualified.) and did not qualify for the semi-finals because her time was 5.43 seconds slower than the slowest qualifier in her heat.

Jane Suuto was the joint oldest person to represent Uganda at the London Games at the age of 33. She had not entered any previous Summer Olympics. Sutto qualified for the Games because she achieved a third-place finish at the 2012 Riga Marathon with a time of 2 hours, 42 minutes, 7 seconds, that met the "B" qualifying standard for the women's marathon. In an interview with New Vision before she competed Suuto said: "I will not promise a medal but I will go out there to offer my best and whatever God offers me. I will take it with both hands. I will go out there and fight." In the event held on 5 August, she finished 93rd out of 107 athletes, with a time of two hours, 44 minutes and 46 seconds. Suuto finished 21 minutes, 39 seconds behind winner Tiki Gelana of Ethiopia (2 hours, 23 minutes, 7 seconds). (Note: Eleven runners did not finish.)

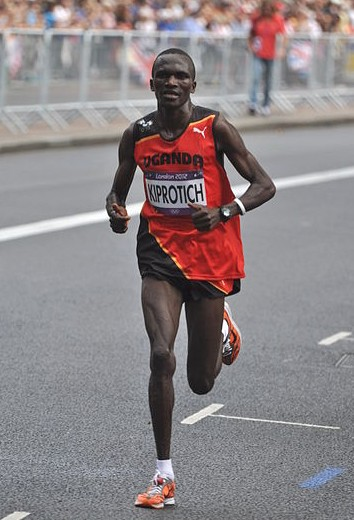
Stephen Kiprotich won the men's marathon, the first gold medal for Uganda since 1972.

Key

- Note–Ranks given for track events are within the athlete's heat only
- q = Qualified for the next round as a fastest loser or, in field events, by position without achieving the qualifying target
- N/A = Round not applicable for the event

Men

| Athlete | Event | Heat | | Semifinal | | Final | |
| Athlete | Event | Result | Rank | Result | Rank | Result | Rank |
|---|---|---|---|---|---|---|---|
| Jacob Araptany | 3000 m steeplechase | 8:35.85 | 7 | — | | did not advance | |
| Thomas Ayeko | 10000 m | — | | | | 27:58.96 | 16 |
| Benjamin Kiplagat | 3000 m steeplechase | 8:18.44 | 6 q | — | | DSQ | |
| Abraham Kiplimo | 5000 m | 13:31.57 | 15 | — | | did not advance | |
| Stephen Kiprotich | Marathon | — | | | | 2:08:01 | (gold) |
| Moses Kipsiro | 5000 m | 13:17.68 | 7 q | — | | 13:52.25 | 15 |
| Moses Kipsiro | 10000 m | — | | | | 27:39.22 | 10 |
| Geoffrey Kusuro | 5000 m | 13:59.74 | 18 | — | | did not advance | |
| Julius Mutekanga | 800 m | 1:48.41 | 5 | did not advance | | | |

Women

| Athlete | Event | Heat | | Semifinal | | Final | |
| Athlete | Event | Result | Rank | Result | Rank | Result | Rank |
|---|---|---|---|---|---|---|---|
| Janet Achola | 1500 m | 4:11.64 | 11 | did not advance | | | |
| Dorcus Inzikuru | 3000 m steeplechase | 9:35.29 | 7 | — | | did not advance | |
| Jane Suuto | Marathon | — | | | | 2:44:46 | 93 |

== Badminton ==
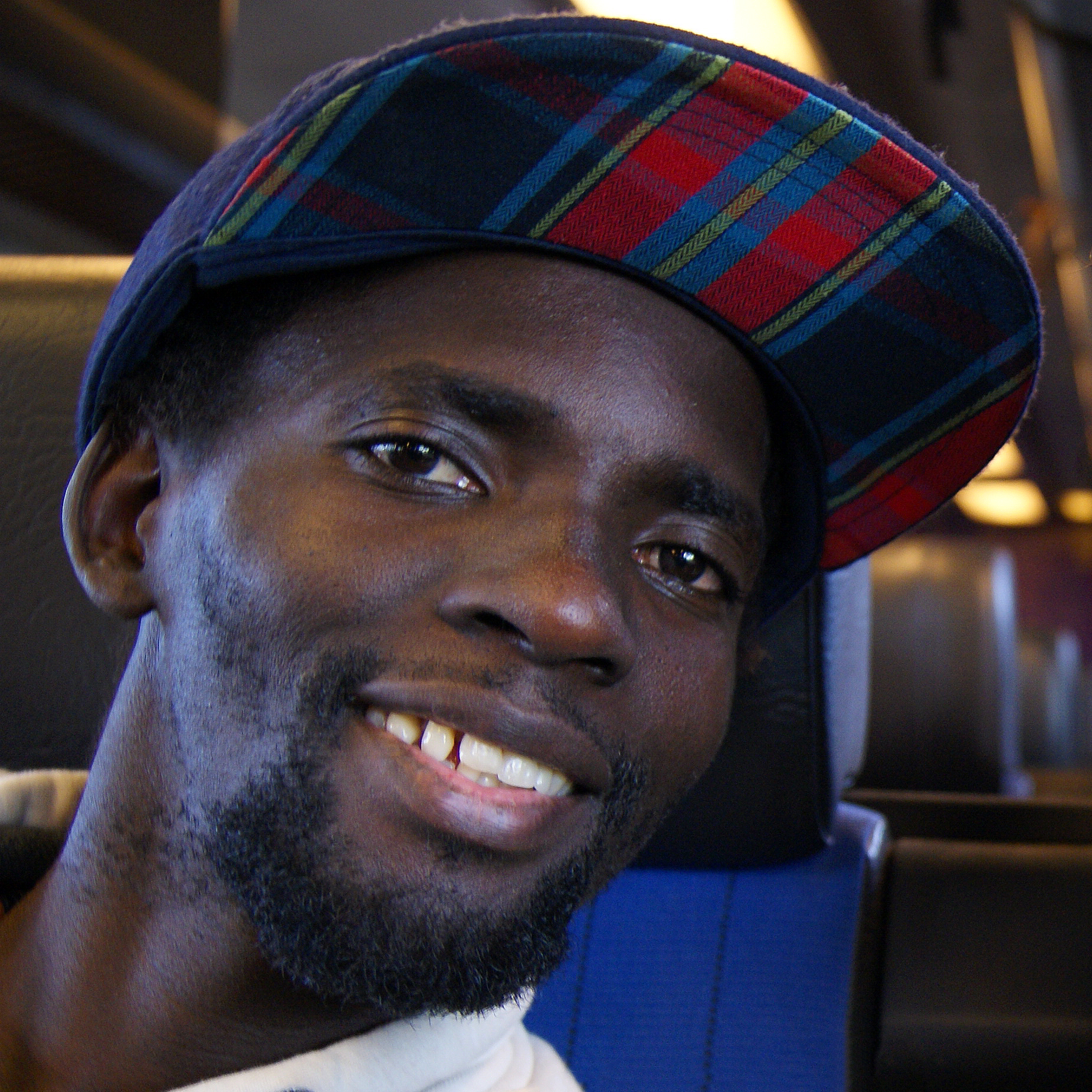
Edwin Ekiring (pictured in 2010) was eliminated from the group stages of men's singles in the Badminton discipline.

Edwin Ekiring was the sole representative for Uganda in the men's singles for Badminton. He was 28 years old and had competed in the 2008 Summer Olympics in Beijing. Ekiring qualified for the Games because he was granted the automatic qualification slot for one player in the African continent partly due to him being placed 98 in the BWF World Ranking in May 2012. He said that his experiences in previous Olympic Games would aid him in progressing up the world rankings. On 28 July, Ekiring played against Brice Leverdez of France in the group stage, whom he lost against in the first round 12–21 and was defeated by his opponent 11–21 in the second round in a 26-minute match. Ekiring's next game was against Hong Kong's Wong Wing Ki two days later whom he lost against in a 26-minute match, scoring ten points while his opponent reached 21 points. He was also defeated in his second round match with a 13-point deficit to Wing Ki and, therefore, he was eliminated from the competition.

| Athlete | Event | Group Stage | | | Elimination | Quarterfinal | Semifinal | Final / BM | |
| Athlete | Event | Opposition Score | Opposition Score | Rank | Opposition Score | Opposition Score | Opposition Score | Opposition Score | Rank |
|---|---|---|---|---|---|---|---|---|---|
| Edwin Ekiring | Men's singles | Wong W K (HKG); L 10–21, 8–21 | Leverdez (FRA); L 12–21, 11–21 | 3 | did not advance | | | | |

== Swimming ==
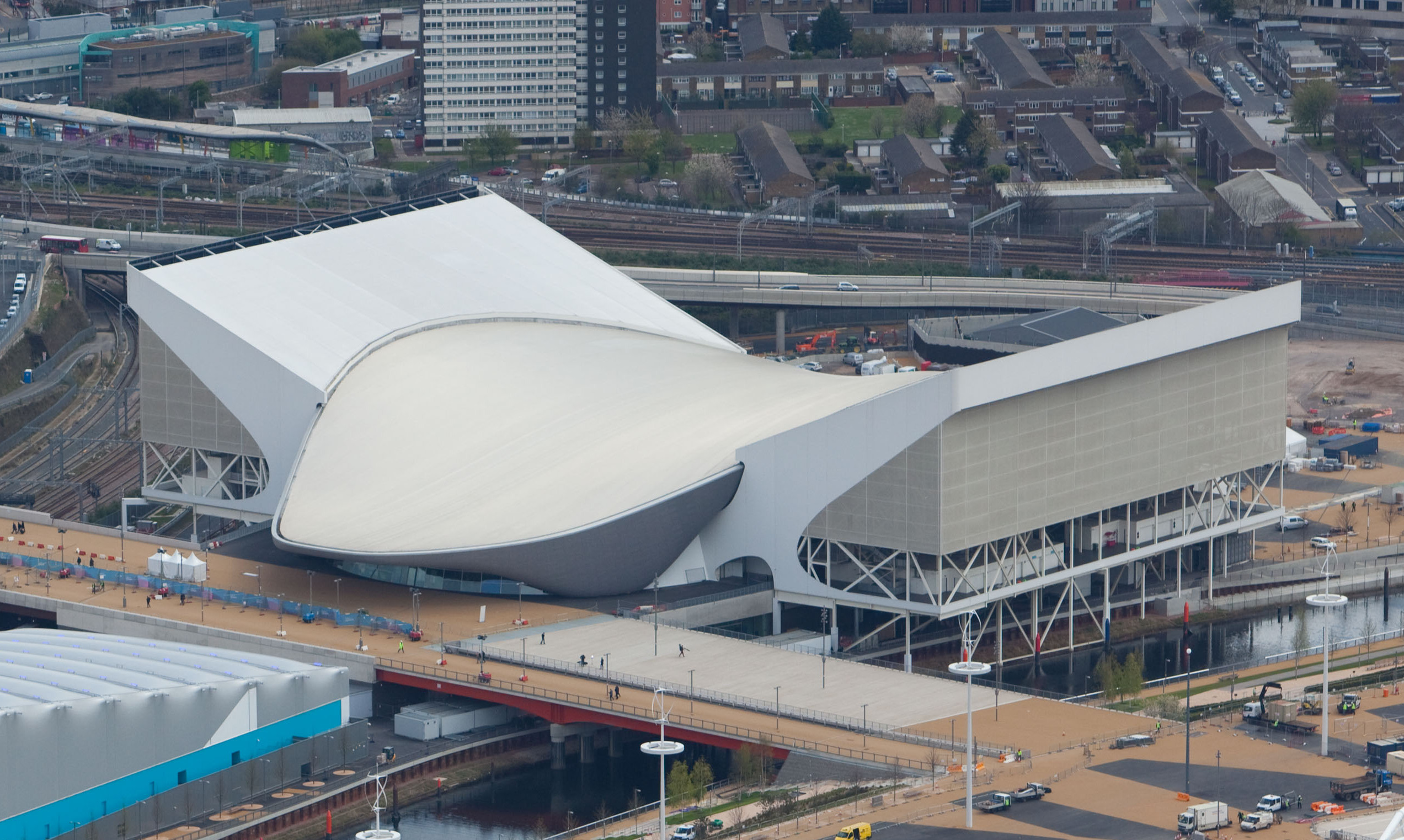
The London Aquatics Centre where Mugula and Lunkuse competed in swimming events.

Ganzi Mugula, who at the age of 33 was participating in his first Olympic Games, was notable for carrying the flag of Uganda in the opening and closing ceremonies. He attempted to qualify for the previous three Olympic Games but did not succeed, but made the London Summer Games via a universality place awarded by FINA because his best time of 27.51 seconds did not reach the "A" or "B" standard entry times for men's 50 metre freestyle. Mugula was drawn in the second heat on 2 August, finishing fifth out of eight swimmers, with a time of 27.58 seconds. Overall he finished 53rd out of 58 swimmers, and was unable to advance to the semi-finals after being 5.11 seconds slower than the slowest competitor who progressed to the later stages. After the event Mugula said: "I felt this time I was fitter. I think psychologically I put too much pressure on myself. But it's OK, I'm not disappointed. I'm an Olympian, that's what counts. It's worth all the effort. Medal or no medal, I'm a winner"

Jamila Lunkuse was the youngest person to represent Uganda at the London Games at the age of 15. Like Mugula she qualified for the Games via a FINA awarded her a universality place because her fastest time of 28.34 seconds was not within the "A" or "B" qualifying standard times for the women's 50 metre freestyle. Mugula stated that while the swimmer had talent, obtaining a medal would be "a tough call" because of her age and inexperience. Lunkuse took part in the event's fifth heat on 2 August, finishing eighth and last of all swimmers, with a time of 28.44 seconds. She finished 52nd out of 73 swimmers, (Note: One swimmer, Eszter Dara, did not start.) and did not qualify for the semi-finals because her time was 3.16 seconds slower than the slowest competitor who progressed to the later stages.

Men

| Athlete | Event | Heat | | Semifinal | | Final | |
| Athlete | Event | Time | Rank | Time | Rank | Time | Rank |
|---|---|---|---|---|---|---|---|
| Ganzi Mugula | 50 m freestyle | 27.58 | 53 | did not advance | | | |

Women

| Athlete | Event | Heat | | Semifinal | | Final | |
| Athlete | Event | Time | Rank | Time | Rank | Time | Rank |
|---|---|---|---|---|---|---|---|
| Jamila Lunkuse | 50 m freestyle | 28.44 | 52 | did not advance | | | |

== Weightlifting ==
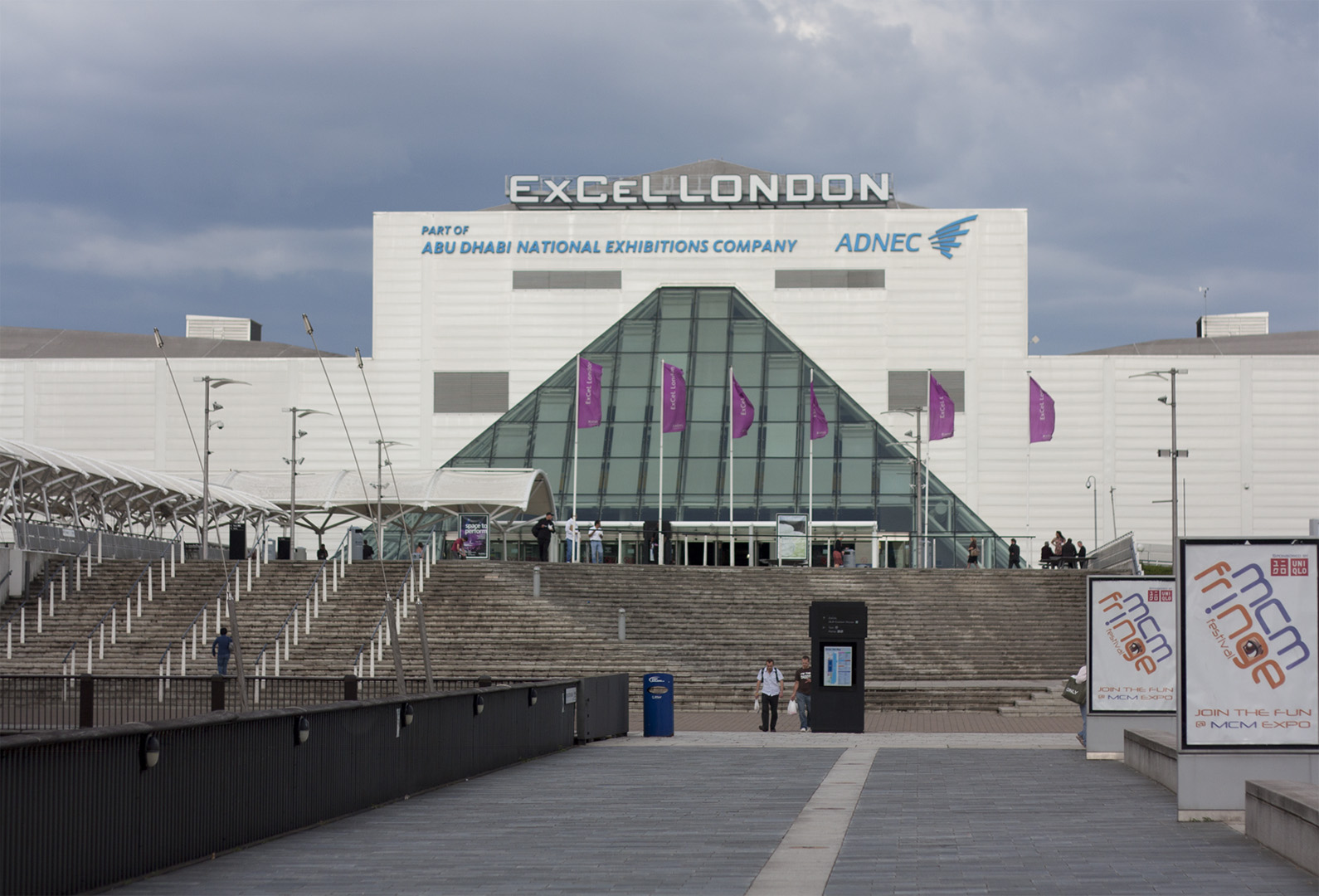
ExCeL London where Ssekyaaya competed in his weightlifting event.

Charles Ssekyaaya participated on Uganda's behalf in the men's 62 kilogram weightlifting discipline. He was 18 years old and had not participated in any previous Olympic Games. Ssekyaaya qualified for the Games after receiving a wildcard from the International Weightlifting Federation after achieving a 28th-place finish in the Africa Olympic Qualifiers. His event took place on 31 July, and included 14 athletes in total. During the event's snatch phase, Ssekyaaya was given three attempts. He successfully attempted to lift over 90 kilograms of weight in his first two attempts, but did not achieve this objective on the third attempt. Ssekyaaya then attempted 130 kilograms during the clean and jerk phrase of the event, successfully lifting it on his first attempt. He did not succeed in lifting 135 kilograms on his second attempt, or 140 on his third. Overall, the combination of Ssekyaaya's highest scores in snatch (105) and clean and jerk (130) yielded a score of 235 points for 13th place. (Note: One weightlifter, Ji Hun-Min, did not finish.)

| Athlete | Event | Snatch | | Clean & Jerk | | Total | Rank |
| Athlete | Event | Result | Rank | Result | Rank | Total | Rank |
|---|---|---|---|---|---|---|---|
| Charles Ssekyaaya | Men's −62 kg | 105 | 14 | 130 | 13 | 235 | 13 |

== See also ==
- Uganda at the 2012 Summer Paralympics
