= Uganda at the 2024 Summer Olympics =

- IOC code: UGA
- NOC: Uganda Olympic Committee
- Website: www.nocuganda.org

in Paris, France 26 July 2024 – 11 August 2024
- Competitors: 24 (11 men and 13 women) in 4 sports
- Flag bearers: Charles Kagimu & Gloria Muzito
- Medals Ranked 55th: Gold 1 Silver 1 Bronze 0 Total 2

Summer Olympics appearances (overview)
- 1956; 1960; 1964; 1968; 1972; 1976; 1980; 1984; 1988; 1992; 1996; 2000; 2004; 2008; 2012; 2016; 2020; 2024

Uganda competed at the 2024 Summer Olympics in Paris from 26 July to 11 August 2024. Since the nation's official debut in 1956, Ugandan athletes have appeared in every edition of the Summer Olympic Games, except for Montreal 1976 as part of the Congolese-led boycott.

Ugandan marathoner Rebecca Cheptegei was murdered by her boyfriend in Eldoret in Kenya over an argument, sustaining multiple burns before dying of multiple organ failure.

== Medalists ==
Medal	Name	Sport	Event	Date
Gold	Joshua Cheptegei	Athletics	Men's 10000 m	2 August
Silver	Peruth Chemutai	Athletics	Women's 3000 m steeplechase	6 August

Medals by sport
Sport	1st place, gold medalist(s)	2nd place, silver medalist(s)	3rd place, bronze medalist(s)	Total
Athletics	1	1	0	2
Total	1	1	0	2

Medals by gender
Gender	1st place, gold medalist(s)	2nd place, silver medalist(s)	3rd place, bronze medalist(s)	Total
Male	1	0	0	1
Female	0	1	0	1
Mixed	0	0	0	0
Total	1	1	0	2

Medals by date
Date	1st place, gold medalist(s)	2nd place, silver medalist(s)	3rd place, bronze medalist(s)	Total
2 August	1	0	0	1
6 August	0	1	0	1
Total	1	1	0	2

== Competitors ==
The following is the list of number of competitors in the Games.

Sport	Men	Women	Total
Athletics	9	11	20
Cycling	1	0	1
Rowing	0	1	1
Swimming	1	1	2
Total	11	13	24

== Athletics ==
Ugandan track and field athletes achieved the entry standards for Paris 2024, either by passing the direct qualifying mark (or time for track and road races) or by world ranking, in the following events (a maximum of 3 athletes each):

Joshua Cheptegei won gold in the men's 10,000 metres final, in a new Olympic record of 26:43.14. Peruth Chemutai won Uganda's second medal of the Games, taking silver in the women's 3000 metres steeplechase while setting a new national record.

Key

- Note–Ranks given for track events are within the athlete's heat only
- Q = Qualified for the next round
- q = Qualified for the next round as a fastest loser or, in field events, by position without achieving the qualifying target
- R = Qualified for Repechage round
- OR = Olympic Record
- NR = National record
- N/A = Round not applicable for the event
- Bye = Athlete not required to compete in round
- DNS = Did not Start

Track and road events
Men

Athlete	Event	Heat		Repechage		Semifinal		Final	
Athlete	Event	Result	Rank	Result	Rank	Result	Rank	Result	Rank
Tarsis Orogot	200 m	20.32	1 Q	—N/a		20.64	6	Did not advance	
Tom Dradriga	800 m	1:46.05	6	1:46.15	5	Did not advance			
Oscar Chelimo	5000 m	13:52.46	5 Q	—N/a				13:31.56	20
Jacob Kiplimo	10000 m	—N/a						26:46.39	8
Joshua Cheptegei	10000 m	—N/a						26:43.14 OR	1st place, gold medalist(s)
Martin Kiprotich	10000 m	—N/a						28:20:72	22
Leonard Chemutai	3000 m steeplechase	8:18.19 SB	2 Q	—N/a				8:20.03	15
Victor Kiplangat	Marathon	—N/a						2:11:59	37
Stephen Kissa	Marathon	—N/a						DNF	
Andrew Rotich Kwemoi	Marathon	—N/a						2:17:28	62

Women

Athlete	Event	Heat		Repechage		Semifinal		Final	
Athlete	Event	Result	Rank	Result	Rank	Result	Rank	Result	Rank
Halimah Nakaayi	800 m	2:00:56	4	2:02:88	6	Did not advance			
Winnie Nanyondo	1500 m	4:07.06	10	4:06.35	8	Did not advance			
Esther Chebet	5000 m	15:10:36	13	—N/a				Did not advance	
Belinda Chemutai	5000 m	15:23:90	12	—N/a				Did not advance	
Joy Cheptoyek	5000 m	DNS		—N/a				Did not advance	
Joy Cheptoyek	10000 m	—N/a						Withdrew	
Sarah Chelangat	10000 m	—N/a						31:02.37	12
Annet Chemengich Chelangat	10000 m	—N/a						31:50.41 PB	21
Peruth Chemutai	3000 m steeplechase	9:10.51	1 Q	—N/a				8:53.34 NR	2nd place, silver medalist(s)
Mercyline Chelangat	Marathon	—N/a						2:39:40 SB	69
Rebecca Cheptegei	Marathon	—N/a						2:32:14 SB	44
Stella Chesang	Marathon	—N/a						2:26:01	8

== Cycling ==
=== Road ===
For the first time since 1984, Uganda entered one male rider to compete in the road race events at the Olympic. The nation's secured those quota through the 2023 African Championships in Accra, Ghana.

Athlete	Event	Time	Rank
Charles Kagimu	Men's road race	6:50:49	77

== Rowing ==
Ugandan rowers qualified one boats in the women's single sculls for the Games through the 2023 African Qualification Regatta in Tunis, Tunisia.

Athlete	Event	Heats		Repechage		Semifinals		Final	
Athlete	Event	Time	Rank	Time	Rank	Time	Rank	Time	Rank
Kathleen Noble	Women's single sculls	8:08.90	5 R	8:15.10	3 SE/F	8:38.70	2 FE	7:56:10	26

Qualification Legend: FA=Final A (medal); FB=Final B (non-medal); FC=Final C (non-medal); FD=Final D (non-medal); FE=Final E (non-medal); FF=Final F (non-medal); SA/B=Semifinals A/B; SC/D=Semifinals C/D; SE/F=Semifinals E/F; QF=Quarterfinals; R=Repechage

== Swimming ==
Uganda sent two swimmers to compete at the 2024 Paris Olympics.

Athlete	Event	Heat		Semifinal		Final	
Athlete	Event	Time	Rank	Time	Rank	Time	Rank
Jesse Ssengonzi	Men's 100 m butterfly	53.76	31	Did not advance			
Gloria Muzito	Women's 100 m freestyle	55.95	22	Did not advance			

Qualifiers for the latter rounds (Q) of all events were decided on a time only basis, therefore positions shown are overall results versus competitors in all heats.
