= Uganda at the 1960 Summer Olympics =

- IOC code: UGA
- NOC: Uganda Olympic Committee

in Rome
- Competitors: 10 in 2 sports
- Medals: Gold 0 Silver 0 Bronze 0 Total 0

Summer Olympics appearances (overview)
- 1956; 1960; 1964; 1968; 1972; 1976; 1980; 1984; 1988; 1992; 1996; 2000; 2004; 2008; 2012; 2016; 2020; 2024

Uganda competed at the 1960 Summer Olympics in Rome, Italy. This was the second time the nation participated, but it represented as a British protectorate though it didn't win any medals.

== Athletics ==
Men

- Benjamin Nguda: Ran in the 100m (reaching the second round) and 200m (first round).
- Patrick Etolu: Finished 12th in the high jump, clearing 1.96m.
- Lawrence Ogwang: Competed in the triple jump (20th place).
- Jean Baptiste Okello: Competed in the 110m hurdles, reaching the semi-finals.

Track & road events

Athlete	Event	Heat		Quarterfinal		Semifinal		Final	
Athlete	Event	Result	Rank	Result	Rank	Result	Rank	Result	Rank
Gadi Ado	400 m	49.0	4	did not advance					
Sam Amukun	100 m	10.6	3 Q	10.6	4	did not advance			
Sam Amukun	200 m	21.3	2 Q	21.3	4	did not advance			
Aggrey Awori	100 m	10.9	5	did not advance					
Aggrey Awori	110 m hurdles	15.36	4 Q	14.94	4	did not advance			
Jean Baptiste Okello	110 m hurdles	14.59	2 Q	14.48	2 Q	14.59	5	did not advance	
Aggrey Awori; Gadi Ado; Sam Amukun; Jean Baptiste Okello	4 × 100 m relay	DQ [41.90]		did not advance					

== Boxing ==
- George Oywello: Competed in the light-heavyweight division.
- Other boxers included Frank Nyangweso, Peter Odhiambo, John Ssentongo, Frank Kisekka, and Grace Sseruwagi.

Athlete	Event	1 Round	2 Round	3 Round	Quarterfinals	Semifinals	Final
Athlete	Event	Opposition Result	Opposition Result	Opposition Result	Opposition Result	Opposition Result	Rank
Frank Kisekka	Flyweight	Paolo Curcetti (ITA); L 1-4	did not advance				
John Sentongo	Bantamweight	BYE	Brunon Bendig (POL); L 0-5	did not advance			
Grace Sseruwagi	Light Welterweight	BYE	Khalid Al-Karkhi (IRQ); L 1-4	did not advance			
Frank Nyangweso	Light Middleweight	—N/a	BYE	Wilbert McClure (USA); L 0-5	did not advance		
Peter Odhiambo	Middleweight	—N/a	BYE	Edward Crook (USA); L 1-4	did not advance		
George Oywello	Light Heavyweight	—N/a	BYE	Gheorghe Negrea (ROU); L 0-5	did not advance		

== See also ==
- Great Britain at the 1960 Summer Olympics
