= Uganda at the 2008 Summer Olympics =

- IOC code: UGA
- NOC: Uganda Olympic Committee
- Website: www.nocuganda.com

in Beijing
- Competitors: 12 in 5 sports
- Flag bearers: Ronald Serugo (opening); Edwin Ekiring (closing)
- Medals: Gold 0 Silver 0 Bronze 0 Total 0

Summer Olympics appearances (overview)
- 1956; 1960; 1964; 1968; 1972; 1976; 1980; 1984; 1988; 1992; 1996; 2000; 2004; 2008; 2012; 2016; 2020; 2024

Uganda competed in the 2008 Summer Olympics held in Beijing, People's Republic of China from August 8 to August 24, 2008. Uganda sent a delegation of eleven competitors, who took part in four sports.

== Athletics ==
The following athletes have secured participation in the Beijing Games.

Men

| Athlete | Event | Heat | | Semifinal | | Final | |
| Athlete | Event | Result | Rank | Result | Rank | Result | Rank |
|---|---|---|---|---|---|---|---|
| Abraham Chepkirwok | 800 m | 1:43.72 | 1 Q | 1:49.16 | 7 | Did not advance | |
| Benjamin Kiplagat | 3000 m steeplechase | 8:20.22 | 4 Q | — | | 8:20.27 | 9 |
| Moses Kipsiro | 5000 m | 13:46.58 | 2 Q | — | | 13:10.56 | 4 |
| Geoffrey Kusuro | 5000 m | 13:50.50 | 11 | — | | Did not advance | |
| Alex Malinga | Marathon | — | | | | 2:18:26 | 31 |
| Boniface Kiprop Toroitich | 10000 m | — | | | | 27:27.28 | 10 |

Women

| Athlete | Event | Heat | | Semifinal | | Final | |
| Athlete | Event | Result | Rank | Result | Rank | Result | Rank |
|---|---|---|---|---|---|---|---|
| Justine Bayigga | 400 m | 54.15 | 7 | Did not advance | | | |

Key

- Note–Ranks given for track events are within the athlete's heat only
- Q = Qualified for the next round
- q = Qualified for the next round as a fastest loser or, in field events, by position without achieving the qualifying target
- NR = National record
- N/A = Round not applicable for the event
- Bye = Athlete not required to compete in round

== Badminton ==
| Athlete | Event | Round of 64 | Round of 32 | Round of 16 | Quarterfinal | Semifinal | Final / BM | |
| Athlete | Event | Opposition Score | Opposition Score | Opposition Score | Opposition Score | Opposition Score | Opposition Score | Rank |
|---|---|---|---|---|---|---|---|---|
| Edwin Ekiring | Men's singles | Bye | Park S-h (KOR); L 5–21, 8–21 | Did not advance | | | | |

== Boxing ==
Uganda qualified one boxer for the Olympic boxing tournament. Ronald Serugo earned Africa's last spot in the light flyweight class, at the second African qualifying tournament.

| Athlete | Event | Round of 32 | Round of 16 | Quarterfinals | Semifinals | Final | |
| Athlete | Event | Opposition Result | Opposition Result | Opposition Result | Opposition Result | Opposition Result | Rank |
|---|---|---|---|---|---|---|---|
| Ronald Serugo | Light flyweight | Serdamba (MGL); L 5–9 | Did not advance | | | | |

== Swimming ==
Men

| Athlete | Event | Heat | | Semifinal | | Final | |
| Athlete | Event | Time | Rank | Time | Rank | Time | Rank |
|---|---|---|---|---|---|---|---|
| Gilbert Kaburu | 50 m freestyle | 27.72 | 82 | Did not advance | | | |

Women

| Athlete | Event | Heat | | Semifinal | | Final | |
| Athlete | Event | Time | Rank | Time | Rank | Time | Rank |
|---|---|---|---|---|---|---|---|
| Olivia Aya Nakitanda | 50 m freestyle | 29.38 | 66 | Did not advance | | | |

== Weightlifting ==
Mubarak Kivumbi was eliminated due to being overweight, at the time he was weighing 58 kg, although some reports state Kivumbi acknowledged he went to the event as a tourist and not a competitor.

| Athlete | Event | Snatch | | Clean & Jerk | | Total | Rank |
| Athlete | Event | Result | Rank | Result | Rank | Total | Rank |
|---|---|---|---|---|---|---|---|
| Mubarak Kivumbi | Men's −56 kg | Did not start | | | | | |

== See also ==
- Uganda at the 2008 Summer Paralympics
