= Uganda at the 2004 Summer Olympics =

- IOC code: UGA
- NOC: Uganda Olympic Committee
- Website: www.nocuganda.com

in Athens
- Competitors: 11 in 4 sports
- Flag bearer: Joseph Lubega
- Medals: Gold 0 Silver 0 Bronze 0 Total 0

Summer Olympics appearances (overview)
- 1956; 1960; 1964; 1968; 1972; 1976; 1980; 1984; 1988; 1992; 1996; 2000; 2004; 2008; 2012; 2016; 2020; 2024

Uganda competed at the 2004 Summer Olympics in Athens, Greece, from 13 to 29 August 2004. This was the nation's twelfth appearance at the Olympics, except the 1976 Summer Olympics in Montreal, because of the African boycott. The Ugandan Olympic Committee sent a total of eleven athletes to the Games, nine men and two women, to compete in four different sports. Half of these athletes had been participating in boxing, including Joseph Lubega, who later became the nation's flag bearer in the opening ceremony. There was only a single competitor in swimming and weightlifting.

Uganda left Athens without a single Olympic medal, since the 1972 Summer Olympics in Munich, where John Akii-Bua won the gold in the men's 400 m hurdles. The nation's best result came with a fourth-place finish from Boniface Kiprop in the men's 10,000 metres.

== Athletics ==
Ugandan athletes have so far achieved qualifying standards in the following athletics events (up to a maximum of 3 athletes in each event at the 'A' Standard, and 1 at the 'B' Standard).

Men

Athlete	Event	Heat		Semifinal		Final	
Athlete	Event	Result	Rank	Result	Rank	Result	Rank
Wilson Busienei	10000 m	—				28:10.75	11
Boniface Kiprop	10000 m	—				27:25.48	4
Paskar Owor	800 m	1:47.87	5	Did not advance			

Women

Athlete	Event	Heat		Final	
Athlete	Event	Result	Rank	Result	Rank
Dorcus Inzikuru	5000 m	15:38.59	12	Did not advance	

Key

- Note–Ranks given for track events are within the athlete's heat only
- Q = Qualified for the next round
- q = Qualified for the next round as a fastest loser or, in field events, by position without achieving the qualifying target
- NR = National record
- N/A = Round not applicable for the event
- Bye = Athlete not required to compete in round

== Boxing ==
Uganda sent five boxers to Athens.

Athlete	Event	Round of 32	Round of 16	Quarterfinals	Semifinals	Final	
Athlete	Event	Opposition Result	Opposition Result	Opposition Result	Opposition Result	Opposition Result	Rank
Jolly Katongole	Light flyweight	Yalçınkaya (TUR); L 7–22	Did not advance				
Brian Mayanja	Featherweight	Jafarov (KAZ); L RSC	Did not advance				
Sam Rukundo	Lightweight	Tamsamani (MAR); W 30–22	de Jesús (PUR); W 24–22	Khrachev (RUS); L 18–31	Did not advance		
Sadat Tebazaalwa	Welterweight	Silamu (CHN); L 17–29	Did not advance				
Joseph Lubega	Middleweight	Prasathinphimai (THA); L 21–30	Did not advance				

== Swimming ==
Men

Athlete	Event	Heat		Semifinal		Final	
Athlete	Event	Time	Rank	Time	Rank	Time	Rank
Edgar Luberenga	50 m freestyle	27.77	75	Did not advance			

== Weightlifting ==
Uganda has qualified a single female weightlifter.

Athlete	Event	Snatch		Clean & Jerk		Total	Rank
Athlete	Event	Result	Rank	Result	Rank	Total	Rank
Irene Ajambo	Women's −69 kg	60	10	90	=8	150	9

== See also ==
- Uganda at the 2004 Summer Paralympics
