= Athletics at the 2012 Summer Olympics – Men's 5000 metres =

Men's 5000 metres at the Games of the XXX Olympiad
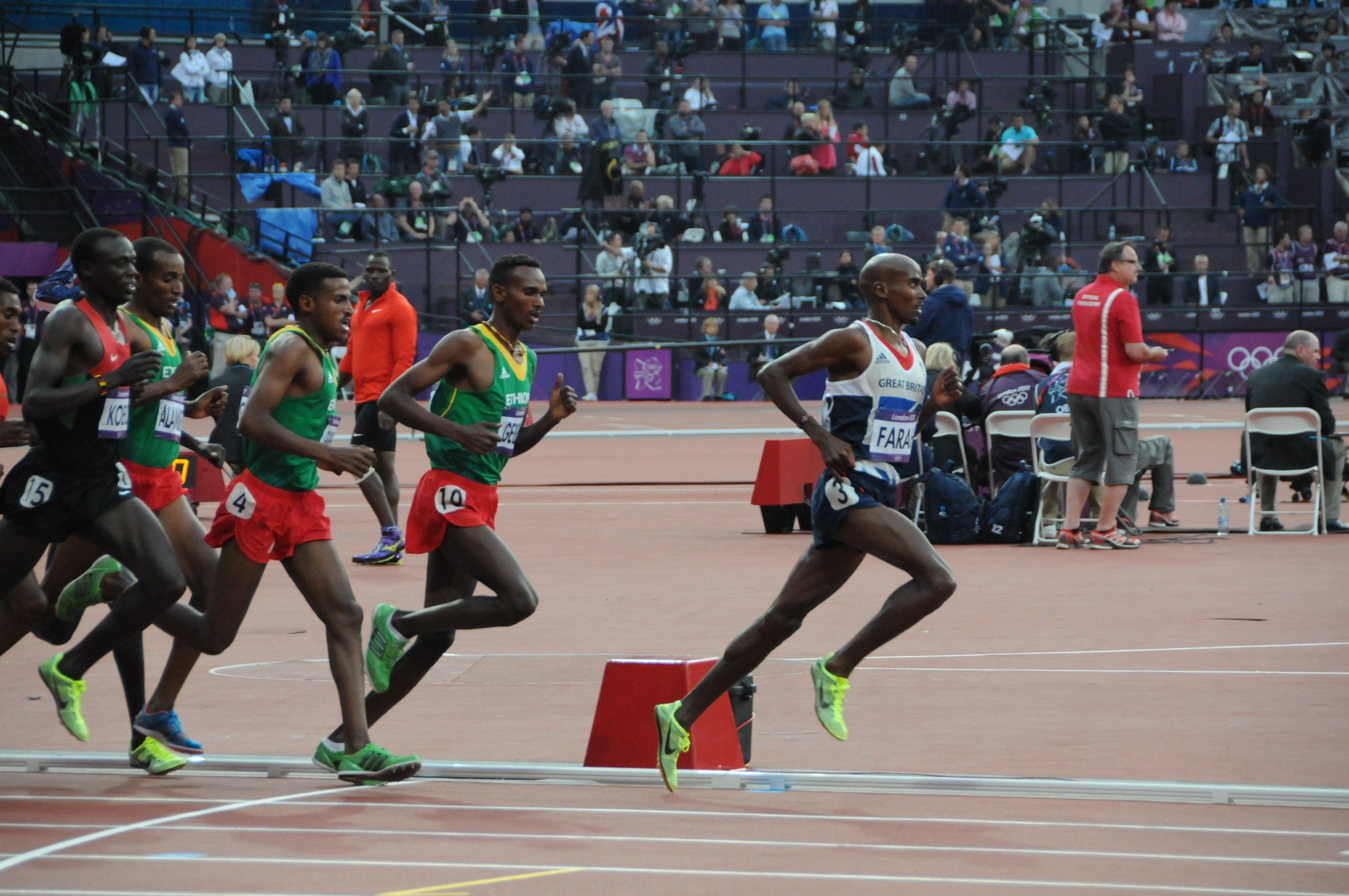
- Farah (right) leading in the closing moments of the race, leading Gebremeskel, Gebrhiwet, Alamirew, and Koech.
- Venue: Olympic Stadium
- Date: 8–11 August
- Competitors: 43 from 26 nations
- Winning time: 13:41.66

Medalists
1st place, gold medalist(s)		Mo Farah	Great Britain
2nd place, silver medalist(s)		Dejen Gebremeskel	Ethiopia
3rd place, bronze medalist(s)		Thomas Pkemei; Longosiwa	Kenya

Official Video

The men's 5000 metres competition at the 2012 Summer Olympics in London, United Kingdom. The event was held at the Olympic Stadium on 8–11 August. In a tactical, slow race, the gold medal was won by 0.32 seconds by reigning World champion Mo Farah of host Great Britain, completing a distance double having won the 10,000 metres a week earlier. Ethiopia's Dejen Gebremeskel took silver, with Thomas Pkemei Longosiwa of Kenya in bronze position.

== Summary ==
The final race started out slowly, the first lap in 74.1 and only that fast because Hayle Ibrahimov accelerated the last 100. The field continued running splits in the 70s, Lopez Lomong leading through 2000 in a pedestrian 5:56.7. In the seventh lap Yenew Alamirew moved to the front and accelerated the pace, the next several laps down below 62, Mo Farah the only one to break up the Ethiopian team at the front. With 700 to go, Farah took the lead, his training partner Galen Rupp joining him with 500 to go, as the rest of the field jostling to be in position to sprint. First Hagos Gebrhiwet challenged, then disappeared. Down the backstretch, Thomas Pkemei Longosiwa challenged, with Abdalaati Iguider immediately behind. Dejen Gebremeskel, Bernard Lagat and Isiah Kiplangat Koech packing up around the final turn. At the head of the stretch, Koech contacted Lagat as he was just coming clear to sprint, Lagat stumbling. Meanwhile, Farah was accelerating ahead of Longosiwa, who couldn't handle the speed. Gebremeskel went around the outside with Lagat's delayed sprint unable to catch Longosiwa. The winning time was more than 15 seconds slower than the slowest time in qualifying.

== Competition format ==
The Men's 5000m competition consisted of heats (Round 1) and a Final. A total of fifteen competitors qualified for the Final from the heats.

== Records ==
Prior to this competition, the existing world and Olympic records were as follows:

World record	Kenenisa Bekele (ETH)	12:37.35	Hengelo, Netherlands	31 May 2004
Olympic record	Kenenisa Bekele (ETH)	12:57.82	Beijing, China	23 August 2008
2012 World leading	Dejen Gebremeskel (ETH)	12:46.81	Paris (Saint-Denis), France	6 July 2012

== Schedule ==
All times are British Summer Time (UTC+1)

Date	Time	Round
Wednesday, 8 August 2012	10:45	Round 1
Saturday, 11 August 2012	19:30	Finals

== Results ==
Official Video of Round 1

=== Round 1 ===
Qual. rule: first 5 of each heat (Q) plus the 5 fastest times (q) qualified.

==== Heat 1 ====
Rank	Athlete	Nation	Time	Notes
1	Hayle Ibrahimov	Azerbaijan	13:25.23	Q
2	Isiah Kiplangat Koech	Kenya	13:25.64	Q
3	Mo Farah	Great Britain	13:26.00	Q
4	Lopez Lomong	United States	13:26.16	Q
5	Hagos Gebrhiwet	Ethiopia	13:26.16	Q
6	Edwin Cheruiyot Soi	Kenya	13:27.06	
7	Arne Gabius	Germany	13:28.01	
8	Daniele Meucci	Italy	13:28.71	
9	Moukheld Al-Outaibi	Saudi Arabia	13:31.47	
10	Bilisuma Shugi	Bahrain	13:31.84	
11	Yuki Sato	Japan	13:38.22	
12	David McNeill	Australia	13:45.88	
13	Olivier Irabaruta	Burundi	13:46.25	
14	Aziz Lahbabi	Morocco	13:47.57	
15	Amanuel Mesel	Eritrea	13:48.13	SB
16	Collis Birmingham	Australia	13:50.39	
17	Serhiy Lebid	Ukraine	13:53.15	
18	Geofrey Kusuro	Uganda	13:59.74	SB
19	Hussain Jamaan Alhamdah	Saudi Arabia	14:00.43	
20	Rene Herrera	Philippines	14:44.11	PB
−	Teklemariam Medhin	Eritrea	DNS	
−	Hassan Hirt	France	DQ	*

- Hassan Hirt originally finished 11th in a time of 13:35.36, but was later disqualified after testing positive for EPO.

==== Heat 2 ====
Rank	Athlete	Nation	Time	Notes
1	Dejen Gebremeskel	Ethiopia	13:15.15	Q
2	Yenew Alamirew	Ethiopia	13:15.39	Q
3	Thomas Pkemei Longosiwa	Kenya	13:15.41	Q
4	Bernard Lagat	United States	13:15.45	Q
5	Abdalaati Iguider	Morocco	13:15.49	Q
6	Galen Rupp	United States	13:17.56	q
7	Moses Ndiema Kipsiro	Uganda	13:17.68	q
8	Cameron Levins	Canada	13:18.29	q, PB
9	Juan Luis Barrios	Mexico	13:21.01	q
10	Mumin Gala	Djibouti	13:21.21	q, SB
11	Abrar Osman Adem	Eritrea	13:24.40	
12	Nick McCormick	Great Britain	13:25.70	
13	Polat Kemboi Arikan	Turkey	13:27.21	
14	Rabah Aboud	Algeria	13:28.38	
15	Abraham Kiplimo	Uganda	13:31.57	
16	Craig Mottram	Australia	13:40.24	
17	Alistair Ian Cragg	Ireland	13:47.01	
18	Soufiyan Bouqantar	Morocco	13:47.63	
19	Javier Carriqueo	Argentina	13:57.07	SB
20	Abdullah Abdulaziz Aljoud	Saudi Arabia	14:11.12	
21	Ruben Sança	Cape Verde	14:35.19	

=== Final ===
Rank	Athlete	Nation	Time	Notes
1st place, gold medalist(s)	Mo Farah	Great Britain	13:41.66	
2nd place, silver medalist(s)	Dejen Gebremeskel	Ethiopia	13:41.98	
3rd place, bronze medalist(s)	Thomas Pkemei Longosiwa	Kenya	13:42.36	
4	Bernard Lagat	United States	13:42.99	
5	Isiah Kiplangat Koech	Kenya	13:43.83	
6	Abdalaati Iguider	Morocco	13:44.19	
7	Galen Rupp	United States	13:45.04	
8	Juan Luis Barrios	Mexico	13:45.30	
9	Hayle Ibrahimov	Azerbaijan	13:45.37	
10	Lopez Lomong	United States	13:48.19	
11	Hagos Gebrhiwet	Ethiopia	13:49.59	
12	Yenew Alamirew	Ethiopia	13:49.68	
13	Mumin Gala	Djibouti	13:50.26	
14	Cameron Levins	Canada	13:51.87	
15	Moses Ndiema Kipsiro	Uganda	13:52.25	

Notes: Q- Qualified by place
q - Qualified by performance (time)
PB - Personal Best
NR - National Record
SB - Seasonal Best
DQ - DisQualified
DNS - Did Not Start
DNF - Did Not Finish
