= Ganzi Mugula =

Ugandan swimmer (born 1979)

Ganzi Mugula OLY
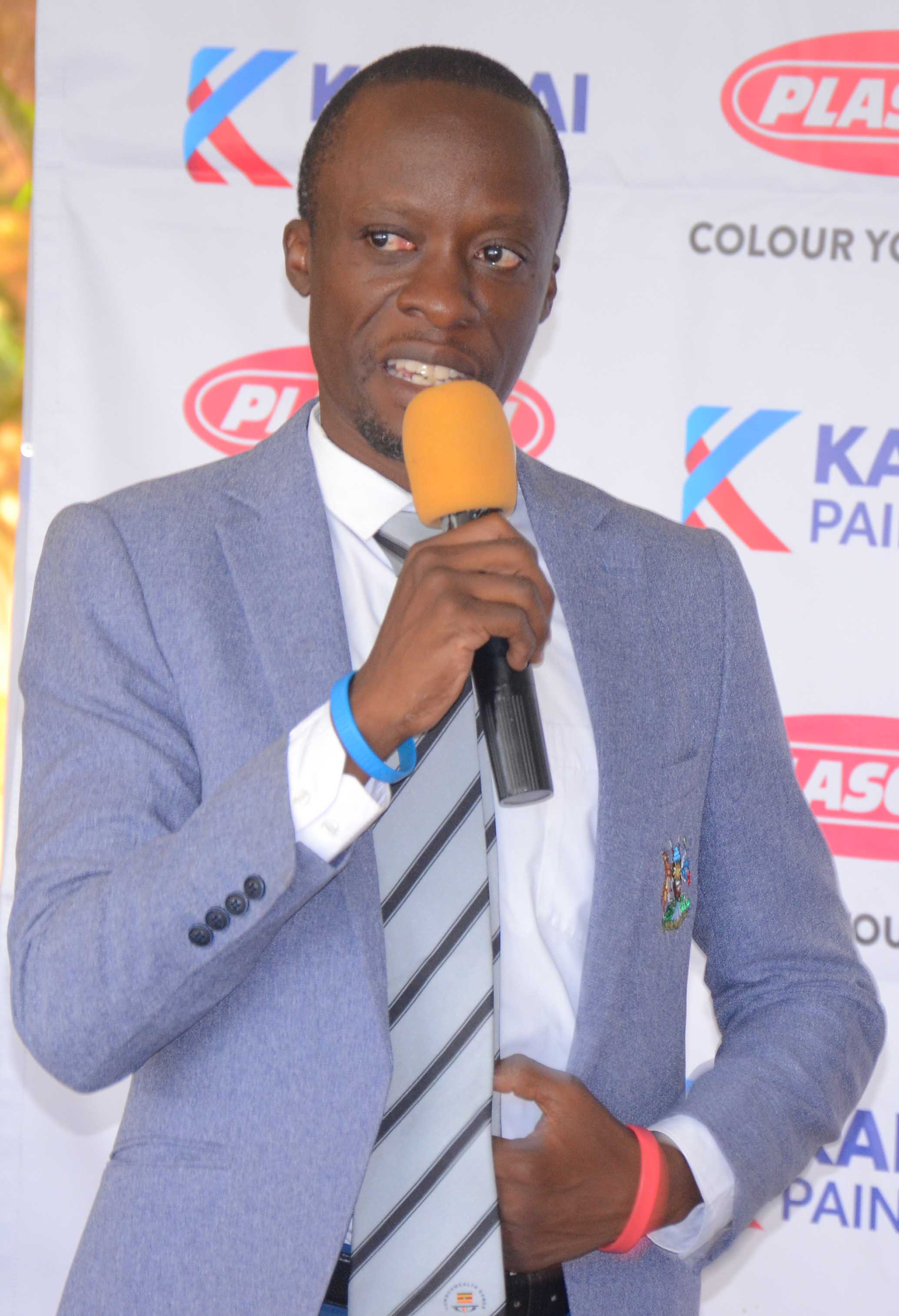

Personal information
- National team: Uganda
- Born: July 24, 1979 (age 47)

Sport
- Sport: Swimming

Ganzi Mugula Semu (born 24 July 1979) is an Olympic swimmer from Uganda. He has swum for Uganda at the:

- Olympics: 2012
- World Championships: 2003, 2009,2011
- Commonwealth Games: 2010
- Short Course Worlds: 2012

Mugula began swimming around 20 years old. At the time of the 2012 Olympics, he was working in IT for a bank in Kampala. At the 2012 Olympics, he served as Uganda's flagbearer.

By 2014, he had transitioned into masters swimming and was a member of the Ugandan Olympic Committee.

Mugula later graduated from the University of London after receiving a scholarship from the World Olympians Association.
