= Uganda at the 1996 Summer Olympics =

- IOC code: UGA
- NOC: Uganda Olympic Committee
- Website: www.nocuganda.com

in Atlanta
- Competitors: 10 (7 men and 3 women) in 4 sports
- Flag bearer: Mary Musoke
- Medals Ranked 71st: Gold 0 Silver 0 Bronze 1 Total 1

Summer Olympics appearances (overview)
- 1956; 1960; 1964; 1968; 1972; 1976; 1980; 1984; 1988; 1992; 1996; 2000; 2004; 2008; 2012; 2016; 2020; 2024

Uganda competed at the 1996 Summer Olympics in Atlanta, United States. During those games Uganda sent a delegation of 10 competitors (7 men and 3 women) to the 1996 Summer Olympics, participating in 4 sports: athletics, boxing, table tennis, and weightlifting. The flag bearer for the opening ceremony was Mary Musoke.

== Medalists ==
Medal	Name	Sport	Event	Date
Bronze	Davis Kamoga	Athletics	Men's 400 metres	July 29

== Competitors ==
The following is the list of number of competitors in the Games.

Sport	Men	Women	Total
Athletics	3	1	4
Boxing	2	–	2
Table tennis	1	2	3
Weightlifting	1	–	1
Total	7	3	10

== Athletics ==
Men
Track & road events

Athlete	Event	Heat		Quarterfinal		Semifinal		Final	
Athlete	Event	Result	Rank	Result	Rank	Result	Rank	Result	Rank
Julius Achon	1500 metres	3:43.08	38	Did not advance					
Davis Kamoga	400 metres	45.56	11 Q	44.82	5 Q	44.85	4 Q	44.53	Bronze medal
Francis Ogola	400 metres	Did not finish		Did not advance					

Women
Track & road events

Athlete	Event	Heat		Quarterfinal		Semifinal		Final	
Athlete	Event	Result	Rank	Result	Rank	Result	Rank	Result	Rank
Grace Birungi	400 metres	53.12	36	Did not advance					

== Boxing ==
Men

Athlete	Event	Round of 32	Round of 16	Quarterfinal	Semifinal	Final
Athlete	Event	Opposition Result	Opposition Result	Opposition Result	Opposition Result	Opposition Result
Franco Agentho	Lightweight	Nieva (ARG); L 12-8	Did not advance			
Charles Kizza	Heavyweight	BYE	Jiang (CHN); L 10-7	Did not advance		

== Table tennis ==
Singles

Athlete	Event	Group round		Round of 16	Quarterfinals	Semifinals	Bronze medal	Final	
Athlete	Event	Opposition Result	Rank	Opposition Result	Opposition Result	Opposition Result	Opposition Result	Opposition Result	Rank
June Kyakobye	Women's singles	Group A Deng Yaping (CHN); L 0 – 2 Marie Svensson (SWE); L 0 – 2 Lisa Lomas (GBR); L 0 – 2	4	Did not advance					
Mary Musoke	Women's singles	Group B Qiao Hong (CHN); L 0 – 2 Rika Sato (JPN); L 0 – 2 Xiaoming Wang-Dréchou (FRA); L 0 – 2	4	Did not advance					
Paul Mutambuze	Men's singles	Group B Wang Tao (CHN); L 0 – 2 Daniel Tsiokas (GRE); L 0 – 2 Danny Heister (NED); L 0 – 2	4	Did not advance					

Doubles

Athlete	Event	Group round		Quarterfinals	Semifinals	Bronze medal	Final	
Athlete	Event	Opposition Result	Rank	Opposition Result	Opposition Result	Opposition Result	Opposition Result	Rank
June Kyakobye; Mary Musoke	Women's doubles	Group D Park Hae-Jeong; Yu Ji-Hye (KOR); L 0 – 2 Bai Hui-Yun; Xu Jing (TPE); L 0 – 2 Emilia Elena Ciosu; Georgeta Cojocaru (ROU); L 0 – 2	4	Did not advance				

== Weightlifting ==
Men

Athletes	Events	Snatch		Clean & jerk		Total	Rank
Athletes	Events	Result	Rank	Result	Rank	Total	Rank
Ali Kavuma	-108 kg	110.0	21	150.0	19	260.0	19

== See also ==
- Uganda at the 1996 Summer Paralympics
- Olympics
- Summer Olympics

== Athlete results (notable) ==
- Davis Kamoga (athletics): Won the only medal for Uganda, a bronze, with a time of 44.37 seconds (a national record).
- Franco Agentho (boxing): Lost in the Round of 32 in the Lightweight category.
- Charles Kizza (boxing): Lost in the Round of 16 in the Heavyweight category.
- Ali Kavuma (weightlifting): Finished 19th in the -108 kg category.
- Mary Musoke, June Kyakobye, and Paul Mutambuze (table tennis): Did not advance past the group rounds in their respective singles and doubles events.
