= Uganda at the 1956 Summer Olympics =

- IOC code: UGA
- NOC: Uganda Olympic Committee

in Melbourne/Stockholm
- Competitors: 3 in 1 sport
- Medals: Gold 0 Silver 0 Bronze 0 Total 0

Summer Olympics appearances (overview)
- 1956; 1960; 1964; 1968; 1972; 1976; 1980; 1984; 1988; 1992; 1996; 2000; 2004; 2008; 2012; 2016; 2020; 2024

Uganda competed in the Summer Olympic Games for the first time at the 1956 Summer Olympics in Melbourne, Australia. They had three competitors, all in the men's track and field athletics. Though Uganda did not represent as an independent, it went as a British protectorate. Uganda has participated in every Summer Olympics since its 1956 debut, except for the 1976 Montreal Games when it joined an African boycott. Their first Olympic medal was a silver won by boxer Eridadi Mukwanga in 1968.

== Competitors ==
- Benjamin Nguda competed in the 100 metres, where he won his first round heat but was knocked out in the second round; and in the 200 metres, where he failed to progress beyond the first round.
- Patrick Etolu competed in the high jump, where he came equal 12th with a height of 1.96m.
- Lawrence Ogwang competed in the long jump, where he failed to qualify for the final; and in the triple jump, where he came 20th with a distance of 14.72m.

== Athletics ==
Men

- Benjamin Nduga: Competed in the men's 100 metres and 200 metres. He advanced to the second round in the 100m but did not progress past the first round in the 200m

Track & road events

Athlete	Event	Heat		Quarterfinal		Semifinal		Final	
Athlete	Event	Result	Rank	Result	Rank	Result	Rank	Result	Rank
Benjamin Nguda	100 m	10.7	1 Q	12.8	6	did not advance			
Benjamin Nguda	200 m	22.89	7	did not advance					

Field events

- Patrick Etolu: Participated in the men's high jump, where he finished tied for 12th place with a height of 1.96 metres.
- Lawrence Ogwang: Competed in both the men's long jump and triple jump. He finished 20th in the triple jump final and failed to qualify for the final in the long jump.

Athlete	Event	Qualification		Final	
Athlete	Event	Distance	Position	Distance	Position
Patrick Etolu	High Jump	1.92	7 Q	1.96	12
Lawrence Ogwang	Long Jump	6.62	27	did not advance	
Lawrence Ogwang	Triple Jump	14.95	14 Q	14.72	20
