= Hassan Hirt =

French long-distance runner

Personal information
- Born: 16 January 1980 (age 46) Saint-Dizier, Haute-Marne, France
- Height: 179 cm (5 ft 10 in)
- Weight: 65 kg (143 lb)

Sport
- Country: France
- Sport: Athletics
- Event: 5000 metres
- Club: Stade Sottevillais 76

Hassan Hirt (born 16 January 1980) is a French long-distance runner. At the 2012 Summer Olympics, he competed in the Men's 5000 metres, finishing 26th overall in Round 1, failing to qualify for the final. He was later disqualified for testing positive for EPO and suspended for 2 years.
