= Uganda at the 2020 Summer Olympics =

- Flag of Uganda
- IOC code: UGA
- NOC: Uganda Olympic Committee
- Website: www.nocuganda.com

in Tokyo, Japan July 23, 2021 – August 8, 2021
- Competitors: 25 in 4 sports
- Flag bearers (opening): Kirabo Namutebi; Shadiri Bwogi
- Flag bearer (closing): Peruth Chemutai
- Medals Ranked 36th: Gold 2 Silver 1 Bronze 1 Total 4

Summer Olympics appearances (overview)
- 1956; 1960; 1964; 1968; 1972; 1976; 1980; 1984; 1988; 1992; 1996; 2000; 2004; 2008; 2012; 2016; 2020; 2024

Uganda competed at the 2020 Summer Olympics in Tokyo. Originally scheduled to take place from 24 July to 9 August 2020, the Games were postponed to 23 July to 8 August 2021, due to the COVID-19 pandemic. Since the nation's official debut in 1956, Ugandan athletes have appeared in every edition of the Summer Olympic Games, with the exception of the 1976 Summer Olympics in Montreal because of its partial support of the African boycott.

== Medalists ==
Medal	Name	Sport	Event	Date
Gold	Peruth Chemutai	Athletics	Women's 3000 m steeplechase	August 4
Gold	Joshua Cheptegei	Athletics	Men's 5000 m	August 6
Silver	Joshua Cheptegei	Athletics	Men's 10000 m	July 30
Bronze	Jacob Kiplimo	Athletics	Men's 10000 m	July 30

== Competitors ==
The following is the list of number of competitors in the Games.

Sport	Men	Women	Total
Athletics	9	10	19
Boxing	2	1	3
Rowing	0	1	1
Swimming	1	1	2
Total	12	13	25

== Athletics ==
Ugandan athletes achieved the entry standards, either by qualifying time or by world ranking, in the following track and field events (up to a maximum of 3 athletes in each event):

Key

- Note–Ranks given for track events are within the athlete's heat only
- Q = Qualified for the next round
- q = Qualified for the next round as a fastest loser or, in field events, by position without achieving the qualifying target
- NR = National record
- N/A = Round not applicable for the event
- Bye = Athlete not required to compete in round

Track & road events
Men

Athlete	Event	Heat		Semifinal		Final	
Athlete	Event	Result	Rank	Result	Rank	Result	Rank
Ronald Musagala	1500 m	DNF		Did not advance			
Oscar Chelimo	5000 m	13:39.07	4 Q	—		13:44.45	16
Joshua Cheptegei	5000 m	13:30.61	5 Q	—		12:58.15	1st place, gold medalist(s)
Jacob Kiplimo	5000 m	13:30.40	4 Q	—		13:02.40	5
Joshua Cheptegei	10000 m	—				27:43.63 SB	2nd place, silver medalist(s)
Jacob Kiplimo	10000 m	—				27:43.88	3rd place, bronze medalist(s)
Stephen Kissa	10000 m	—				DNF	
Albert Chemutai	3000 m steeplechase	8:29.81	9	—		Did not advance	
Felix Chemonges	Marathon	—				2:20:53	51
Stephen Kiprotich	Marathon	—				DNF	
Fred Musobo	Marathon	—				2:18:39	44

Women

Athlete	Event	Heat		Semifinal		Final	
Athlete	Event	Result	Rank	Result	Rank	Result	Rank
Leni Shida	400 m	52.48	6	Did not advance			
Halimah Nakaayi	800 m	2:00.92	4 q	2:04.44	8	Did not advance	
Winnie Nanyondo	800 m	2:02.02	2 Q	1:59.84 SB	5	Did not advance	
Winnie Nanyondo	1500 m	4:02.24	2 Q	4:01.64	4 Q	3:59.80 SB	7
Esther Chebet	5000 m	15:11.47	12	—		Did not advance	
Sarah Chelangat	5000 m	15:59.40 SB	19	—		Did not advance	
Prisca Chesang	5000 m	15:25.72	15	—		Did not advance	
Mercyline Chelangat	10000 m	—				33:10.90	24
Peruth Chemutai	3000 m steeplechase	9:12.72 SB	2 Q	—		9:01.45 NR	1st place, gold medalist(s)
Juliet Chekwel	Marathon	—				2:53:40	69
Immaculate Chemutai	Marathon	—				2:32:23	16

== Boxing ==
Uganda entered three boxers into the Olympic tournament. Shadiri Bwogi scored a box-off victory to secure a spot in the men's welterweight division at the 2020 African Qualification Tournament in Diamniadio, Senegal. Kavuma David Ssemujju (men's middleweight) and Catherine Nanziri (women's flyweight) completed the nation's boxing lineup by topping the list of eligible boxers from Asia and Oceania in their respective weight divisions of the IOC's Boxing Task Force Rankings.

Athlete	Event	Round of 32	Round of 16	Quarterfinals	Semifinals	Final	
Athlete	Event	Opposition Result	Opposition Result	Opposition Result	Opposition Result	Opposition Result	Rank
Shadiri Bwogi	Men's welterweight	Bye	Madiev (GEO); L 1–3	Did not advance			
Kavuma David Ssemujju	Men's middleweight	Nemouchi (ALG); L 0–5	Did not advance				
Catherine Nanziri	Women's flyweight	Namiki (JPN); L 0–5	Did not advance				

== Rowing ==
Uganda qualified one boat in the women's single sculls for the Games by topping the field in the B-final and securing the third of five berths available at the 2019 FISA African Olympic Qualification Regatta in Tunis, Tunisia, marking the country's debut in the sport.

Athlete	Event	Heats		Repechage		Quarterfinals		Semifinals		Final	
Athlete	Event	Time	Rank	Time	Rank	Time	Rank	Time	Rank	Time	Rank
Kathleen Grace Noble	Women's single sculls	8:21.85	5 R	8:36.01	3 SE/F	Bye		8:31.67	2 FE	8:07.00	26

Qualification Legend: FA=Final A (medal); FB=Final B (non-medal); FC=Final C (non-medal); FD=Final D (non-medal); FE=Final E (non-medal); FF=Final F (non-medal); SA/B=Semifinals A/B; SC/D=Semifinals C/D; SE/F=Semifinals E/F; QF=Quarterfinals; R=Repechage

== Swimming ==
Uganda received a universality invitation from FINA to send two top-ranked swimmers (one per gender) in their respective individual events to the Olympics, based on the FINA Points System of June 28, 2021.

Athlete	Event	Heat		Semifinal		Final	
Athlete	Event	Time	Rank	Time	Rank	Time	Rank
Atuhaire Ambala	Men's 100 m freestyle	54.23	63	Did not advance			
Kirabo Namutebi	Women's 50 m freestyle	26.63	47	Did not advance			
