= Uganda at the 1992 Summer Olympics =

- IOC code: UGA
- NOC: Uganda Olympic Committee

in Barcelona
- Competitors: 8 (6 men and 2 women) in 3 sports
- Flag bearer: Fred Muteweta
- Medals: Gold 0 Silver 0 Bronze 0 Total 0

Summer Olympics appearances (overview)
- 1956; 1960; 1964; 1968; 1972; 1976; 1980; 1984; 1988; 1992; 1996; 2000; 2004; 2008; 2012; 2016; 2020; 2024

Uganda competed at the 1992 Summer Olympics in Barcelona, Spain. The nation was represented by eight competitors (six men and two women) across three sports: athletics, boxing, and table tennis, however the nation didn't record any medal.

== Competitors ==
The following is the list of number of competitors in the games.

Sport	Men	Women	Total
Athletics	3	1	4
Boxing	3	–	3
Table tennis	0	1	1
Total	6	2	8

== Athletics ==
Uganda had five athletes compete in the athletics events at the 1992 Summer Olympics in Barcelona, Spain. The team consisted of four men and one woman, none of whom advanced to the final rounds in their events.

Men
Track & road events

Athlete	Event	Heat		Quarterfinal		Semifinal		Final	
Athlete	Event	Result	Rank	Result	Rank	Result	Rank	Result	Rank
Michael Lopeyok	Marathon	—N/a						2:42:54	82
Francis Ogola	200 m	21.29	4 Q	21.41	8	Did not advance			
Francis Ogola	400 m	45.87	4 Q	46.21	7	Did not advance			
Joel Otim	100 m	10.84	5	Did not advance					

Women
Track & road events

Athlete	Event	Heat		Quarterfinal		Semifinal		Final	
Athlete	Event	Result	Rank	Result	Rank	Result	Rank	Result	Rank
Edith Nakiyingi	800 m	2:03.55	7	Did not advance					

== Boxing ==
Uganda was represented by three boxers at the 1992 Summer Olympics in Barcelona: Fred Mutuweta, Davis Lusimbo, and Godfrey Wakaabu. All three boxers were eliminated in the second round of their respective events and did not win any medals.

Men

Athlete	Event	1 Round	2 Round	3 Round	Quarterfinals	Semifinals	Final
Athlete	Event	Opposition Result	Opposition Result	Opposition Result	Opposition Result	Opposition Result	Rank
Fred Mutuweta	Bantamweight	—N/a	Wayne McCullough (IRL); L 7-28	Did not advance			
Davis Lusimbo	Featherweight	—N/a	Mohamed Soltani (TUN); L 8-13	Did not advance			
Godfrey Wakaabu	Light Welterweight	—N/a	Mark Leduc (CAN); L 2-9	Did not advance			

== Table tennis ==
Paul Mutambuze (men's singles), and the pair of Nadunga Kyakobye and Mary Musoke (women's doubles), did not progress past the first round.

Women

Athlete	Event	Group stage				Round of 16	Quarterfinals	Semifinals	Final	
Athlete	Event	Opposition Result	Opposition Result	Opposition Result	Rank	Opposition Result	Opposition Result	Opposition Result	Opposition Result	Rank
Mary Musoke	Women's singles	Emilia Ciosu (ROU); L 0-2	Chan Tan Lui (HKG); L 0-2	BYE	3	Did not advance				

== See also ==
- Olympics
- Summer Olympics
- 1992 Summer Olympics

== Sources ==
- Official Olympic Reports
