= Joshua Tibatemwa =

Ugandan swimmer

Joshua Ekirikubinza Tibatemwa
Personal information
- Nationality: Ugandan
- Born: 10 September 1996 (age 29) Kampala, Uganda

Sport
- Country: Uganda
- Sport: Swimming

Joshua Tibatemwa-Ekirikubinza (born 10 September 1996) is a Ugandan Olympic swimmer. He represented his country at the 2016 Summer Olympics, where he ranked 64th with a time of 25.98 seconds. He did not advance to the semifinals. He was Uganda's flagbearer during the opening ceremony.

== Education ==
He attended and graduated from the Aga Khan Academy in Mombasa in 2015. He later attended Grinnell College in Iowa, USA, where he studied computer science and economics.

== Career ==
He set two national records at the World Championships in Kazan, Russia in 2015, for 50m freestyle and 50m breaststroke. Also, at the Rio 2016 Olympics, he competed in the men's 50m freestyle event finishing 64th out of the 85 swimmers in the heats with a time of 25.98 seconds. Though he did not make it for the semi-finals.

== Major results ==
=== Individual ===
==== Long course ====
Year	Competition	Venue	Position	Event	Notes
Representing Uganda
2013	World Championships	Barcelona, Spain	70th (h)	50 m breaststroke	33.85
2014	Commonwealth Games	(United Kingdom) Glasgow, Great Britain	47th (h)	50 m freestyle	25.78
2014	Commonwealth Games	(United Kingdom) Glasgow, Great Britain	34th (h)	50 m breaststroke	33.72
2014	Commonwealth Games	(United Kingdom) Glasgow, Great Britain	31st (h)	100 m breaststroke	1:16.49
2015	World Championships	Kazan, Russia	80th (h)	50 m freestyle	25.54
2015	World Championships	Kazan, Russia	64th (h)	50 m breaststroke	33.00
2016	Olympic Games	Rio de Janeiro, Brazil	64th (h)	50 m freestyle	25.98
2017	World Championships	Budapest, Hungary	104th (h)	100 m freestyle	58.79
2017	World Championships	Budapest, Hungary	71st (h)	50 m breaststroke	32.77
2018	Commonwealth Games	Gold Coast, Australia	47th (h)	50 m freestyle	24.93
2018	Commonwealth Games	Gold Coast, Australia	43rd (h)	50 m butterfly	27.17

==== Short course ====
Year	Competition	Venue	Position	Event	Notes
Representing Uganda
2012	World Championships	Istanbul, Turkey	122nd (h)	50 m freestyle	26.14
2012	World Championships	Istanbul, Turkey	83rd (h)	50 m breaststroke	32.48
2016	World Championships	Windsor, Canada	-	50 m breaststroke	DNS
2016	World Championships	Windsor, Canada	-	100 m breaststroke	DNS

== See also ==
- 2016 Summer Olympics
- Daniel Mulumba
- Gloria Muzito
- Olivia Aya Nakitanda
- Kirabo Namutebi
- Supra Singhal
- Jesse Ssengonzi

Olympic Games
Preceded by Ganzi Mugula	Flagbearer for Uganda; Rio de Janeiro 2016	Succeeded by Kirabo Namutebi; Shadiri Bwogi
