= Uganda at the 1988 Summer Olympics =

- IOC code: UGA
- NOC: Uganda Olympic Committee

in Seoul
- Competitors: 25 in 3 sports
- Flag bearer: Patrick Lihanda
- Medals: Gold 0 Silver 0 Bronze 0 Total 0

Summer Olympics appearances (overview)
- 1956; 1960; 1964; 1968; 1972; 1976; 1980; 1984; 1988; 1992; 1996; 2000; 2004; 2008; 2012; 2016; 2020; 2024

Uganda competed at the 1988 Summer Olympics in Seoul, South Korea.

== Competitors ==
The following is the list of number of competitors in the Games.

| Sport | Men | Women | Total |
|---|---|---|---|
| Athletics | 9 | 4 | 13 |
| Boxing | 9 | – | 9 |
| Weightlifting | 2 | – | 2 |
| Total | 20 | 4 | 24 |

== Athletics ==
=== Men ===
Track & road events

| Athlete | Event | Heat | | Quarterfinal | | Semifinal | | Final | |
| Athlete | Event | Result | Rank | Result | Rank | Result | Rank | Result | Rank |
|---|---|---|---|---|---|---|---|---|---|
| John Goville | 400 m | 47.11 | 5 | did not advance | | | | | |
| Benjamin Longiross | Marathon | — | | | | | | 2:30.29 | 62 |
| Jackson Fred Ogwang | Marathon | — | | | | | | 2:59.35 | 92 |
| Sunday Olweny | 200 m | 21.79 | 47 | did not advance | | | | | |
| Vincent Ruguga | Marathon | — | | | | | | 2:31.04 | 63 |
| Joseph Ssali | 100 m | 10.95 | 7 | did not advance | | | | | |
| Moses Musonge; Joseph Ssali; John Goville; Mike Okot | 4 × 400 m relay | 41.39 | 6 | did not advance | | | | | |

==== Field events ====
| Athlete | Event | Qualification | | Final | |
| Athlete | Event | Distance | Position | Distance | Position |
|---|---|---|---|---|---|
| Justin Arop | Javelin throw | 69.10 | 33 | did not advance | |

=== Women ===
Track & road events

| Athlete | Event | Heat | | Quarterfinal | | Semifinal | | Final | |
| Athlete | Event | Result | Rank | Result | Rank | Result | Rank | Result | Rank |
|---|---|---|---|---|---|---|---|---|---|
| Oliver Acii | 200 m | 24.39 | 39 | did not advance | | | | | |
| Farida Kyakutewa | 100 m | 12.32 | 8 | did not advance | | | | | |
| Farida Kyakutewa | 400 m | 56.00 | 5 | did not advance | | | | | |
| Ruth Kyalisima | 400 m hurdles | 59.62 | 6 | did not advance | | | | | |
| Oliver Acii; Grace Buzu; Farida Kyakutewa; Ruth Kyalisima | 4 × 100 m relay | 46.55 | 6 | did not advance | | | | | |
| Jane Ajilo; Grace Buzu; Farida Kyakutewa; Ruth Kyalisima | 4 × 400 m relay | DNS | | did not advance | | | | | |

== Boxing ==
Men

| Athlete | Event | 1 Round | 2 Round | 3 Round | Quarterfinals | Semifinals | Final |
| Athlete | Event | Opposition Result | Opposition Result | Opposition Result | Opposition Result | Opposition Result | Rank |
|---|---|---|---|---|---|---|---|
| Fred Mutuweta | Light Flyweight | BYE | Wayne McCullough (IRL); L 0-5 | did not advance | | | |
| Emmanuel Nsubuga | Flyweight | BYE | Salem Obeyb (YMD); W TKO-1 | Benaissa Abed (ALG); L 2-3 | did not advance | | |
| Edward Obewa | Bantamweight | Vedat Tutuk (TUR); L 2-3 | did not advance | | | | |
| Charles Lubulwa | Lightweight | Blessing Onoko (NGR); L RSC-3 | did not advance | | | | |
| Dan Odindo | Light Welterweight | Ollo Destre (GAB); W WO | Sodnomdarjaagiin Altansükh (MGL); L RSC-2 | did not advance | | | |
| Kasmiro Omona | Welterweight | Alexander Künzler (FRG); L 0-5 | did not advance | | | | |
| John Bosco Waigo (Note: otherwise John Boscoe Waigo) | Light Middleweight | BYE | Sounaila Sagnon (BUR); L RSC-1 | did not advance | | | |
| Franco Wanyama | Middleweight | BYE | Omar Dabaj (JOR); W 5-0 | Kieran Joyce (IRL); W 3-2 | Chris Sande (KEN); L 0-5 | did not advance | 5 |
| Patrick Lihanda | Light Heavyweight | — | Nurmagomed Shanavazov (URS); L 2-3 | did not advance | | | |

== Weightlifting ==
Men

| Athlete | Event | Snatch | | Clean & Jerk | | Total | Rank |
| Athlete | Event | Result | Rank | Result | Rank | Total | Rank |
|---|---|---|---|---|---|---|---|
| Joseph Kaddu Kuteesa | −67.5 kg | 90.0 | 22 | 125.0 | 19 | 215.0 | 21 |
| Ali Kavuma | −90 kg | 100.0 | 25 | 132.5 | 24 | 232.5 | 24 |

== See also ==
- Uganda at the 1996 Summer Olympics
- Uganda at the 2000 Summer Olympics
- Uganda at the 2004 Summer Olympics
- Uganda at the 2008 Summer Olympics
- Uganda at the 2012 Summer Olympics
- Uganda at the 2016 Summer Olympics
- Uganda at the 2020 Summer Olympics
- Uganda at the 2024 Summer Olympics
