= Uganda at the 2000 Summer Olympics =

- IOC code: UGA
- NOC: Uganda Olympic Committee
- Website: www.nocuganda.com

in Sydney
- Competitors: 13 (9 men and 4 women) in 5 sports
- Flag bearer: Muhamed Kizito
- Medals: Gold 0 Silver 0 Bronze 0 Total 0

Summer Olympics appearances (overview)
- 1956; 1960; 1964; 1968; 1972; 1976; 1980; 1984; 1988; 1992; 1996; 2000; 2004; 2008; 2012; 2016; 2020; 2024

Uganda was represented at the 2000 Summer Olympics in Sydney, New South Wales, Australia by the Uganda Olympic Committee.

In total, 13 athletes including nine men and four women represented Uganda in five different sports including archery, athletics, boxing, swimming and table tennis.

== Competitors ==
In total, 13 athletes represented Uganda at the 2000 Summer Olympics in Sydney, New South Wales, Australia across five different sports.

| Sport | Men | Women | Total |
|---|---|---|---|
| Archery | 0 | 1 | 1 |
| Athletics | 4 | 1 | 5 |
| Boxing | 4 | – | 4 |
| Swimming | 1 | 1 | 2 |
| Table tennis | 0 | 1 | 1 |
| Total | 9 | 4 | 13 |

== Archery ==
In total, one Ugandan athlete participated in the archery events – Margaret Tumusiime in the women's individual.

The ranking round for the women's individual took place on 16 September 2000. Tumusiime scored 474 points and was ranked 64th. The first round matches took place the following day. Tumusiime lost to the top seed and eventual gold medal winner Kim Soo-Nyung of South Korea by 164–124.

| Athlete | Event | Ranking round | | Round of 64 | Round of 32 | Round of 16 | Quarterfinals | Semifinals | Final / BM | |
| Athlete | Event | Score | Seed | Opposition Score | Opposition Score | Opposition Score | Opposition Score | Opposition Score | Opposition Score | Rank |
|---|---|---|---|---|---|---|---|---|---|---|
| Margaret Tumusiime | Women's individual | 474 | 64 | Kim Soo-Nyung (KOR) (1); L 124–164 | did not advance | | | | | 64 |

== Athletics ==
In total, five Ugandan athletes participated in the athletics events – Julius Achon in the men's 1,500 m, Grace Birungi in the women's 800 m, Davis Kamoga in the men's 400 m, Alex Malinga in the men's marathon and Paskar Owor in the men's 800 m.

The heats for the men's 400 m took place on 22 September 2000. Kamoga finished third in his heat in a time of 45.92 seconds as he qualified for the quarter-finals. The quarter-finals took place the following day. Kamoga finished sixth in his quarter-final in a time of 45.74 seconds. He did not advance to the semi-finals. On 2 August 2008, Kamoga was upgraded to second in his heat and fifth in his quarter-final after the disqualification of Antonio Pettigrew.

The heats for the women's 800 m also took place on 22 September 2000. Birungi finished fifth in her heat in a time of two minutes 3.32 seconds. She did not advance to the semi-finals.

The heats for the men's 800 m took place on 23 September 2000. Owor finished sixth in his heat in a time of one minute 49.99 seconds. He did not advance to the semi-finals.

The heats for the men's 1,500 m took place on 25 September 2000. Achon finished seventh in his heat in a time of three minutes 39.4 seconds. He qualified for the semi-finals as one of the fastest losers. The semi-finals took place on 27 September 2000. Achon finished sixth in his semi-final in a time of three minutes 40.32 seconds which was ultimately not fast enough to advance to the final.

The men's marathon took place on 1 October 2000. Malinga completed the course in a time of two hours 24 minutes 53 seconds and finished 57th overall.

| Athlete | Event | Heat | | Quarterfinal | | Semifinal | | Final | |
| Athlete | Event | Result | Rank | Result | Rank | Result | Rank | Result | Rank |
|---|---|---|---|---|---|---|---|---|---|
| Julius Achon | Men's 1,500 m | 3:39.40 | 7 q | —N/a | | 3:40.32 | 6 | did not advance | |
| Davis Kamoga | Men's 400 m | 45.92 | 3 Q | 45.74 | 25 | did not advance | | | |
| Alex Malinga | Men's marathon | —N/a | | | | | | 2:24:53 | 57 |
| Paskar Owor | Men's 800 m | 1:49.99 | 51 | did not advance | | | | | |
| Grace Birungi | Women's 800 m | 2:03.32 | 5 | did not advance | | | | | |

== Boxing ==
In total, four Ugandan athletes participated in the boxing events – Kassim Napa Adam in the Featherweight, Jackson Asiku in the flyweight category, Muhamed Kizito in the light Flyweight category and Abdu Tebazalwa in the bantamweight category.

The first round of the bantamweight category took place on 16 September 2000. Tebazalwa lost his first round match to César Morales of Mexico.

The first round of the light flyweight category took place on 17 September 2000. Kizito lost his first round match to Ivanas Stapovičius of Lithuania.

The first round of the featherweight category took place on 18 September 2000. Adam lost his first round match to Tulkunbay Turgunov of Uzbekistan.

The first round of the flyweight category took place on 19 September 2000. Asiku lost his first round match to Arlan Lerio of the Philippines.

| Athlete | Event | Round of 32 | Round of 16 | Quarterfinals | Semifinals | Final | |
| Athlete | Event | Opposition Result | Opposition Result | Opposition Result | Opposition Result | Opposition Result | Rank |
|---|---|---|---|---|---|---|---|
| Muhamed Kizito | Light flyweight | Ivanas Stapovičius (LTU); L 3–9 | did not advance | | | | |
| Jackson Asiku | Flyweight | Arlan Lerio (PHI); L RSC-1 | did not advance | | | | |
| Abdu Tebazalwa | Bantamweight | César Morales (MEX); L 8–13 | did not advance | | | | |
| Kassim Napa Adam | Featherweight | Tulkunbay Turgunov (UZB); L 3–12 | did not advance | | | | |

== Swimming ==
In total, two Ugandan athletes participated in the swimming events – Joe Atuhaire in the men's 100 m breaststroke and Supra Singhal in the women's 100 m freestyle.

The heats for the men's 100 m breaststroke took place on 16 September 2000. Atuhaire finished third in his heat in a time of one minute 22.35 seconds which was ultimately not fast enough to advance to the semi-finals.

The heats for the women's 100 m freestyle took place on 20 September 2000. Singhal finished sixth in her heat in a time of one minute 8.15 seconds which was ultimately not fast enough to advance to the semi-finals.

| Athlete | Event | Heat | | Semifinal | | Final | |
| Athlete | Event | Time | Rank | Time | Rank | Time | Rank |
|---|---|---|---|---|---|---|---|
| Joe Atuhaire | Men's 100 m breaststroke | 1:22.35 | 65 | did not advance | | | |
| Supra Singhal | Women's 100 m freestyle | 1:08.15 | 52 | did not advance | | | |

== Table tennis ==
In total, one Ugandan athlete participated in the table tennis events – Mary Musoke in the women's singles.

The preliminary round of the women's singles took place from 17 to 19 September 2000. Musoke contested group N against Irina Palina of Russia and Song Ah Sim of Hong Kong. She lost her first match against Palina 21–9 21–9 21–18 and then lost her second match against Song 21–16 21–9 21–11. She finished third in the group and did not advance.

| Athlete | Event | Group round | | Round of 16 | Quarterfinals | Semifinals | Bronze medal | Final | |
| Athlete | Event | Opposition Result | Rank | Opposition Result | Opposition Result | Opposition Result | Opposition Result | Opposition Result | Rank |
|---|---|---|---|---|---|---|---|---|---|
| Mary Musoke | Women's singles | Group N Irina Palina (RUS); L 0 – 3 Song Ah Sim (HKG); L 0 – 3 | 3 | did not advance | | | | | |
