= Uganda at the 1980 Summer Olympics =

- IOC code: UGA
- NOC: Uganda Olympic Committee

in Moscow
- Competitors: 13 (13 men and 0 women) in 2 sports
- Flag bearer: John Mugabi
- Medals Ranked 32nd: Gold 0 Silver 1 Bronze 0 Total 1

Summer Olympics appearances (overview)
- 1956; 1960; 1964; 1968; 1972; 1976; 1980; 1984; 1988; 1992; 1996; 2000; 2004; 2008; 2012; 2016; 2020; 2024

Uganda competed at the 1980 Summer Olympics in Moscow, USSR. The nation returned to the Olympic Games after boycotting the 1976 Summer Olympics. In this campaign it had a standout performance in boxing where Mugabi John "The Beast" who won a silver medal in the Welterweight division, becoming the sole Ugandan medalist at those games. This was the third boxing medal for Uganda overall. The Ugandan team also included track and field athletes, but Mugabi's success was the highlight, marking a significant moment for Ugandan sports.

== Medalists ==
=== Silver ===
- John Mugabi — Boxing, Men's Welterweight

== Athletics ==
Men

- John Akii-Bua: Men's 400 metres hurdles (did not advance past the semifinals) and 4 × 400 metres relay
- Silver Ayoo: Men's 400 metres and 4 × 400 metres relay
- Charles Dramiga: Men's 400 metres and 4 × 400 metres relay
- Pius Olowo: Men's 4 × 400 metres relay
- Fidelis Ndyabagye: Men's Long Jump
- Justin Arop: Men's Javelin Throw (finished 12th in the final)
- The team included track and field athletes, but the star, John Akii-Bua (400m hurdles), could not replicate his 1972 gold, battling personal issues, though he still competed in relays.

Athlete	Event	Heat		Quarterfinal		Semifinal		Final	
Athlete	Event	Result	Rank	Result	Rank	Result	Rank	Result	Rank
John Akii-Bua	400 m hurdles	50.87	5 Q	—N/a		51.10	7	did not advance	
Silver Ayoo	400 m	47.78	3 Q	47.03	5	did not advance			
Charles Dramiga	400 m	48.69	5	did not advance					
Pius Olowo; Charles Dramiga; John Akii-Bua; Silver Ayoo	4 × 400 m relay	3:07.0	5	did not advance					

Field events

- Justin Arop in the men's Javelin throw
- Fidelis Ndyabangye in the men's long jump

Athlete	Event	Qualification		Final	
Athlete	Event	Distance	Position	Distance	Position
Justin Arop	Javelin throw	82.68	8 Q	77.34	12
Fidelis Ndyabagye	Long jump	NM		did not advance	

== Boxing ==
Men

- Charles Lubulwa: Light Flyweight
- John Siryakibbe: Bantamweight (reached the quarterfinals, finishing 5th)
- Geofrey Nyeko: Lightweight
- John Munduga: Light Welterweight and team captain
- John Mugabi: Welterweight (won the silver medal)
- George Kabuto: Light Middleweight
- Peter Odhiambo: Middleweight (reached the quarterfinals, finishing 5th)

Athlete	Event	1 Round	2 Round	3 Round	Quarterfinals	Semifinals	Final	
Athlete	Event	Opposition Result	Opposition Result	Opposition Result	Opposition Result	Opposition Result	Rank	
Charles Lubulwa	Light Flyweight	—N/a	BYE	György Gedó (HUN); L TKO-1	did not advance			
John Siryakibbe	Bantamweight	—N/a	Aleksandr Radev (BUL); W TKO-1	Ali ben Maghenia (FRA); W 5–0	Bernardo Piñango (VEN); L TKO-2	did not advance		5
Geofrey Nyeko	Lightweight	BYE	Richard Nowakowski (GDR); L TKO-1	did not advance				
John Munduga	Light Welterweight	—N/a	Nelson José Rodriguez (VEN); W 4–1	Farouk Jawad (IRQ); L TKO-1	did not advance			
John Mugabi	Welterweight	—N/a	Georges Koffi (CGO); W TKO-1	Paul Rasamimanana (MAD); W TKO-1	Mehmet Bogujevci (YUG); W TKO-1	Kazimierz Szczerba (POL); W 3–2	Andrés Aldama (CUB); L 1–4	Silver medal
George Kabuto	Light Middleweight	—N/a	Seifu Retta (ETH); W 5–0	Armando Martínez (CUB); L TKO-1	did not advance			
Peter Odhiambo	Middleweight	—N/a	BYE	John Martins (NGR); W TKO-2	Jerzy Rybicki (POL); L 0–5	did not advance		5

== See also ==
- Olympics
- Summer Olympics
- 1980 Summer Olympics
