= Abraham Kiplimo =

Ugandan long-distance runner

- Abraham Kiplimo
- Pronunciation: Kiplimo
- Born: 14/April/1989; Saum Kapchorwa
- Citizenship: Uganda
- Occupation: Athlete
- Known for: long distance running

Abraham Kiplimo
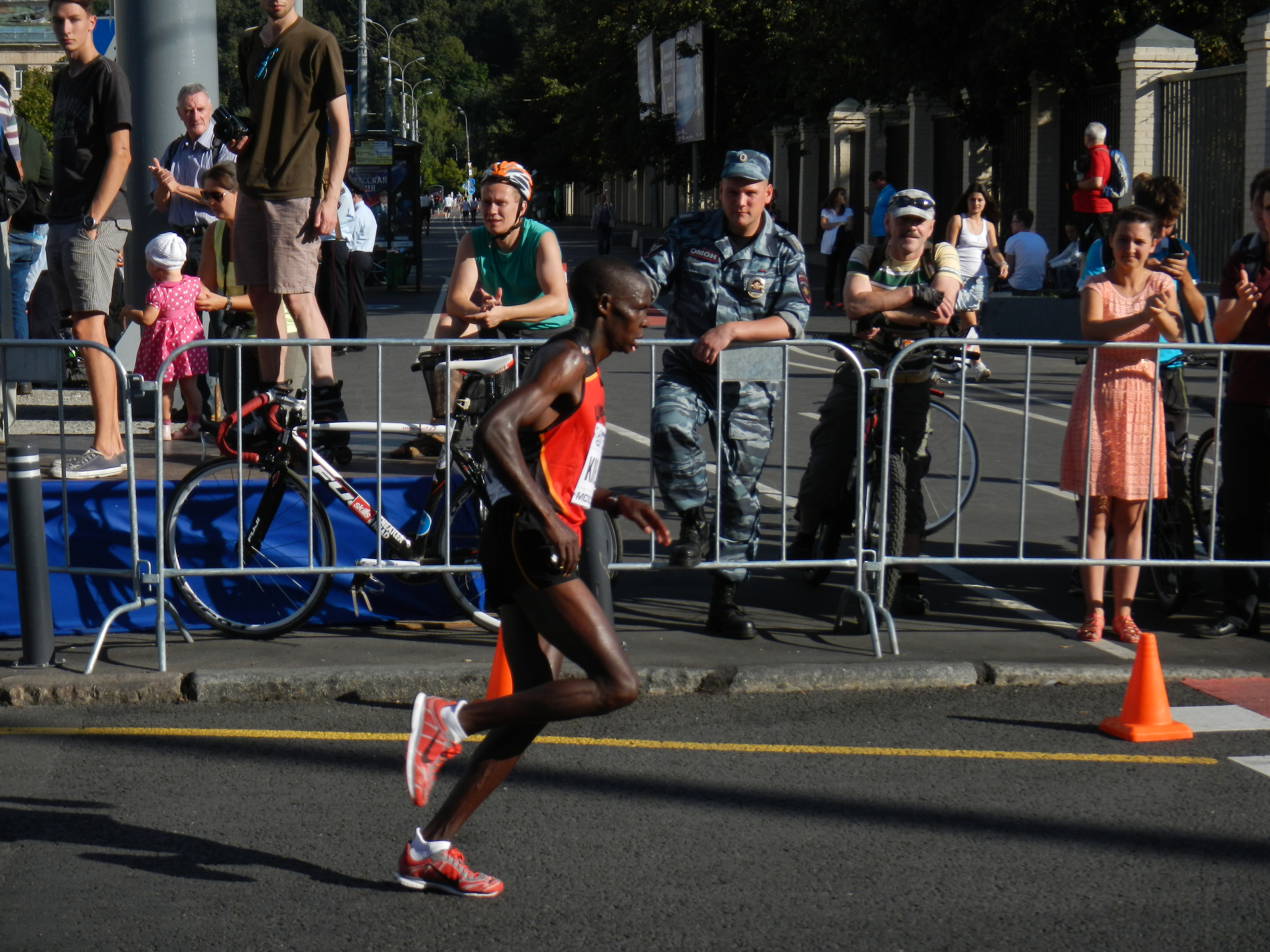
- Abraham Kiplimo

Personal information
- Born: 14 April 1989 (age 37) Suam, Kapchorwa District, Uganda

Sport
- Sport: Track and field, road running
- Events: 5000 metres, marathon

Abraham Kiplimo (born 14 April 1989 in Suam, Kapchorwa District) is a Ugandan long-distance runner. At the 2012 Summer Olympics, he competed in the Men's 5000 metres, finishing 24th overall in Round 1, failing to qualify for the final. At the 2011 World Championships in Athletics he failed to get past the heats of the 5000 m.

== Career ==
Kiplimo made his marathon debut at the 2013 Rotterdam Marathon, finishing eleventh in a time of 2:13:32 hours. He represented his country in the marathon at the 2013 World Championships in Athletics and placed 19th overall. He had his first marathon win at the 2014 Beppu-Oita Marathon in Japan. His victory in a time of 2:09:23 hours (a personal best of over four minutes) marked the first time he had ranked within the top ten over the distance.

At the 2014 Commonwealth Games, Kiplimo won a bronze medal for Uganda in the men's marathon, finishing behind Michael Shelley of Australia and Kenya's Stephen Kwelio Chemlany in a time of 2:12:23 hours. This was Kiplimo's maiden international medal.

== See also ==
- Moses Kipsiro
- Abraham Chepkirwok
