= Mary Musani =

Ugandan hurdler (born 1944)

Mary Musani OLY
Personal information
- Nationality: Ugandan
- Born: 4 September 1944 (age 81)

Sport
- Sport: Track and field
- Event: 80 metres hurdles

Mary Musani (born 4 September 1944) is a Ugandan hurdler. She competed in the women's 80 metres hurdles at the 1964 Summer Olympics.
