= Irene Muyanga =

Ugandan sprinter

Personal information
- Nationality: Ugandan
- Born: 12 November 1943 (age 81)

Sport
- Sport: Sprinting
- Event: 100 metres

Irene P. M. Muyanga (born 12 November 1943) is a Ugandan sprinter. She competed in the women's 100 metres at the 1964 Summer Olympics. She was the first woman to represent Uganda at the Olympics.
