= Charles Kagimu =

Ugandan cyclist (born 1998)

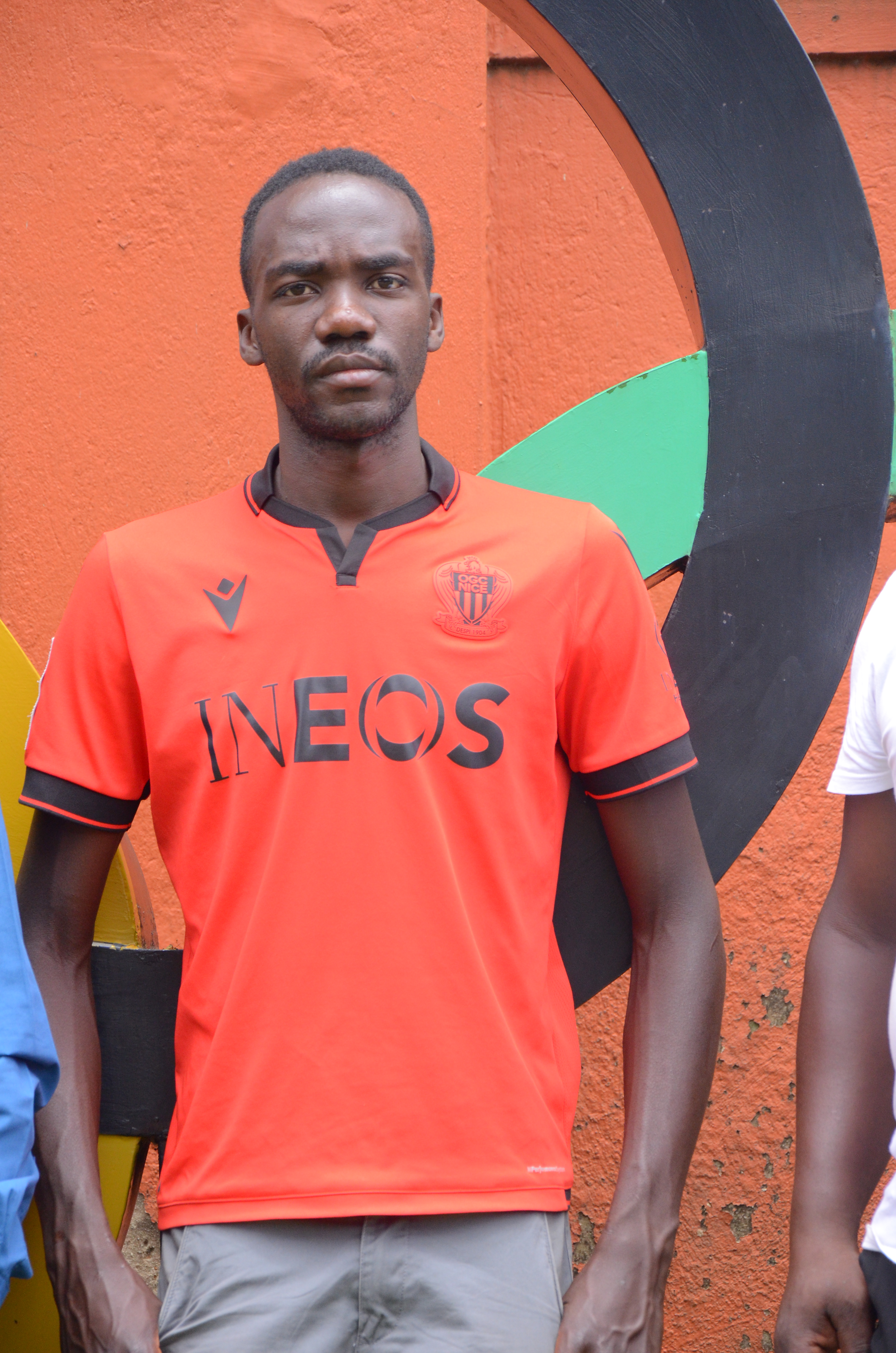

Personal information
- Born: 15 September 1998 (age 28) Kawempe, Kampala
- Height: 1.80 m (5 ft 11 in)
- Weight: 63 kg (139 lb)

Cycling career
- Sport: Cycling
- Current team: Team Amani
- Disciplines: Road; Gravel
- Role: Rider

Amateur teams
- 2023: Kenyan Riders
- 2024: Ride United

Professional teams
- 2017: Bike Aid (stagiaire)
- 2018–2021: Bike Aid
- 2022: ProTouch
- 2025–: Team Amani
Medal record
Men's road bicycle racing
Representing Uganda
African Games
Gold medal – first place	2023 Accra	Time trial
African Championships
Gold medal – first place	2023 Accra	Time trial
Gold medal – first place	2024 Eldoret	Time trial

Charles Kagimu (born 15 September 1998) is a Ugandan professional road and gravel cyclist who won the time trial at the African Road Championships in 2023.

== Career ==
Kagimu rides for Amani Cycling Club in Kenya who led a team of 12 elite riders on a five day 800 km journey to support refugee children in northern Uganda. He was chosen to compete in the road race at the 2023 UCI Road World Championships, but did not finish. He also competed in the road race at the 2024 Summer Olympics.

== Achievements and recognitions ==
- won the gold medal in the time trial at the 2023 African Games held in 2024 in Accra, Ghana.

== Major results ==
=== Road ===
2017
10th Overall Tour of Quanzhou Bay
2021
6th Time trial, African Championships
2022
1st Eddie Njoroge Memorial
2023
African Championships

1st Time trial
7th Road race

1st Great Rift Valley Challenge
2024
1st Time trial, African Championships
African Games

1st Time trial
6th Road race

1st Grand Nairobi Bike Race
6th Overall Tour de Maurice
8th Classique de l'Île Maurice
2025
National Championships

1st Road race
1st Time trial

2nd Kaptagat Cycling Challenge

=== Gravel ===
2023
8th Belgian Waffle Ride North Carolina
2025
UCI World Series

2nd Safari Gravel

7th Overall Gravel Tierra de Campos

== See also ==
- Eric Manizabayo
- Ryan Mullen
- Ernest Buule

Olympic Games
Preceded by Shadiri Bwogi; Kirabo Namutebi	Flag bearer for Uganda; Paris 2024 with Gloria Muzito	Succeeded by Incumbent
