= Grace Sseruwagi =

Ugandan boxer and coach (1933–2018)

Personal information
- Full name: Peter Grace Sseruwagi
- Nationality: Ugandan
- Born: 30 December 1933; Namutamba, Uganda
- Died: 6 February 2018 (aged 84)

Sport
- Sport: Boxing

Peter Grace Sseruwagi (30 December 1933 – 6 February 2018) was a Ugandan boxer and coach for the national team. He competed in the men's light welterweight event at the 1960 Summer Olympics. At the 1960 Summer Olympics, he lost to Khalid Al-Karkhi of Iraq.
