= Uganda at the Olympics =

- IOC code: UGA
- NOC: Uganda Olympic Committee
- Website: www.nocuganda.com
- Medals Ranked 72nd: Gold 5 Silver 5 Bronze 3 Total 13

Summer appearances
- 1956; 1960; 1964; 1968; 1972; 1976; 1980; 1984; 1988; 1992; 1996; 2000; 2004; 2008; 2012; 2016; 2020; 2024

Uganda first participated at the Olympic Games in 1956, and has sent athletes to compete in every Summer Olympic Games since then, except for the boycotted 1976 Summer Olympics. The nation has never competed at the Winter Olympic Games.

Ugandan athletes have won a total of thirteen medals, all in athletics and boxing.

The National Olympic Committee for Uganda was created in 1950 and recognized by the International Olympic Committee in 1956.

== Medal tables ==
=== Medals by Summer Games ===
Games	Athletes	Gold	Silver	Bronze	Total	Rank
1956 Melbourne	3	0	0	0	0	–
1960 Rome	10	0	0	0	0	–
1964 Tokyo	13	0	0	0	0	–
1968 Mexico City	11	0	1	1	2	38
1972 Munich	33	1	1	0	2	24
1976 Montreal	boycotted					
1980 Moscow	13	0	1	0	1	32
1984 Los Angeles	26	0	0	0	0	–
1988 Seoul	24	0	0	0	0	–
1992 Barcelona	8	0	0	0	0	–
1996 Atlanta	10	0	0	1	1	71
2000 Sydney	13	0	0	0	0	–
2004 Athens	11	0	0	0	0	–
2008 Beijing	12	0	0	0	0	–
2012 London	15	1	0	0	1	50
2016 Rio de Janeiro	21	0	0	0	0	–
2020 Tokyo	25	2	1	1	4	36
2024 Paris	24	1	1	0	2	55
2028 Los Angeles	future event					
2032 Brisbane	future event					
Total		5	5	3	13	72

=== Medals by sport ===
Sport	Gold	Silver	Bronze	Total
Athletics	5	2	2	9
Boxing	0	3	1	4
Totals (2 entries)	5	5	3	13

== List of medalists ==
Medal	Name	Games	Sport	Event
Silver	Eridadi Mukwanga	1968 Mexico City	Boxing	Men's bantamweight
Bronze	Leo Rwabwogo	1968 Mexico City	Boxing	Men's flyweight
Gold	John Akii-Bua	1972 Munich	Athletics	Men's 400 metre hurdles
Silver	Leo Rwabwogo	1972 Munich	Boxing	Men's flyweight
Silver	John Mugabi	1980 Moscow	Boxing	Men's welterweight
Bronze	Davis Kamoga	1996 Atlanta	Athletics	Men's 400 metres
Gold	Stephen Kiprotich	2012 London	Athletics	Men's marathon
Gold	Peruth Chemutai	2020 Tokyo	Athletics	Women's 3000 metres steeplechase
Gold	Joshua Cheptegei	2020 Tokyo	Athletics	Men's 5,000 metres
Silver	Joshua Cheptegei	2020 Tokyo	Athletics	Men's 10,000 metres
Bronze	Jacob Kiplimo	2020 Tokyo	Athletics	Men's 10,000 metres
Gold	Joshua Cheptegei	2024 Paris	Athletics	Men's 10,000 metres
Silver	Peruth Chemutai	2024 Paris	Athletics	Women's 3000 metres steeplechase

== See also ==
- List of flag bearers for Uganda at the Olympics
- Category:Olympic competitors for Uganda
- Uganda at the Paralympics
