= Jane Suuto =

Ugandan long-distance runner

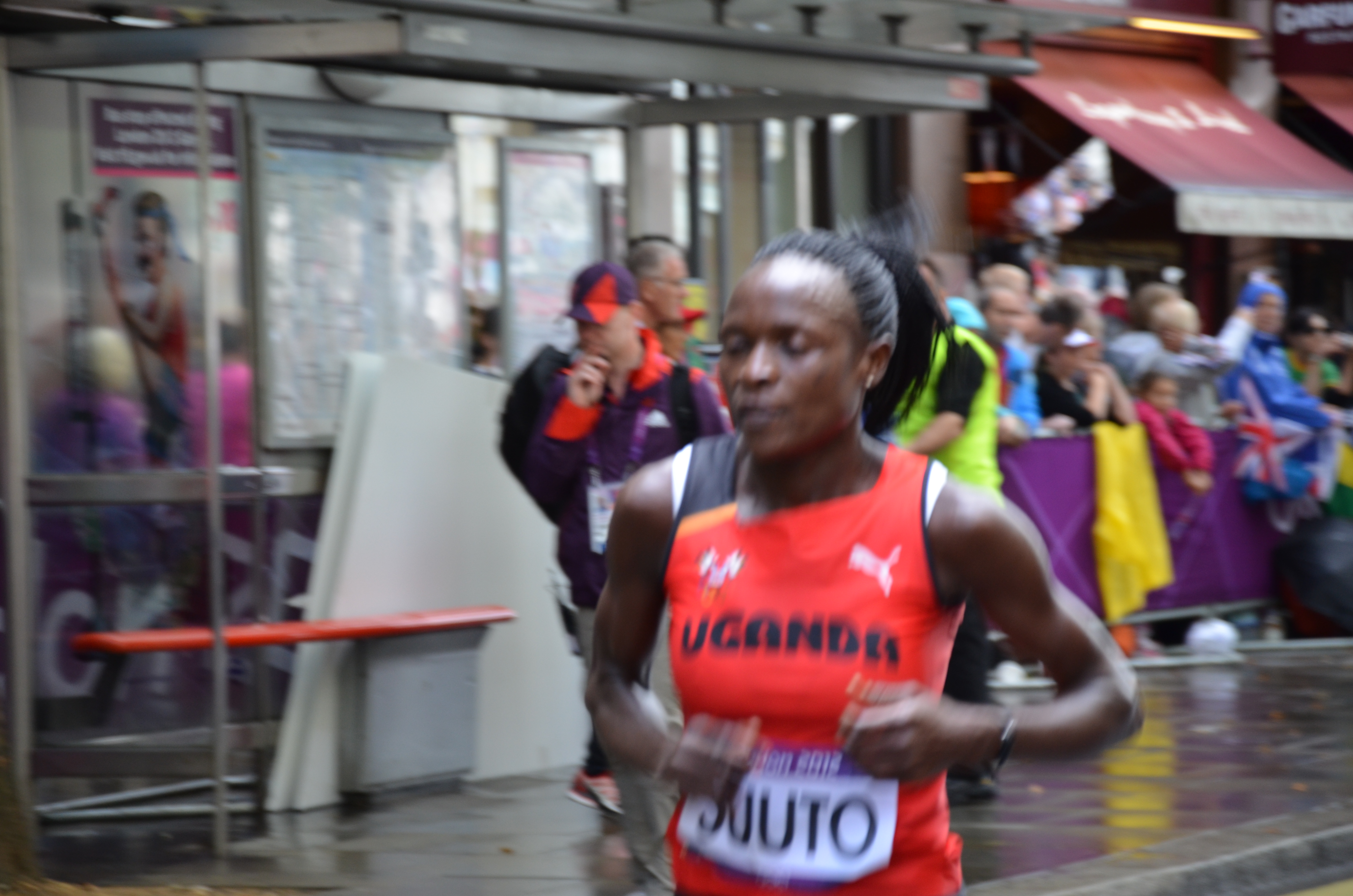
- Suuto in the 2012 Summer Olympics marathon

Personal information
- Born: August 8, 1978 (age 47)
- Height: 1.76 m (5 ft 9 1/2 in)
- Weight: 58 kg (128 lb)

Sport
- Country: Uganda
- Sport: Athletics
- Event: Marathon

Jane Suuto (born 8 August 1978 in Mbale) is a Ugandan long-distance runner. She competed in the marathon at the 2012 Summer Olympics, placing 93rd with a time of 2:44:46.
