= Ronald Serugo =

Ugandan boxer (born 1984)

Personal information
- Nationality: Ugandan
- Born: September 5, 1984 (age 42) Uganda

Boxing career
- Sport: Boxing
- Weight class: Junior flyweight, Flyweight

Achievements and titles
- Olympic finals: 2008, 2016

Ronald Serugo (born 5 September 1984) is a Ugandan amateur boxer who qualified for the 2008 Summer Olympics in the junior flyweight division. He defeated Tresford Kaziwa, then lost to Redouane Bouchtouk 0:11 before winning the third spot by defeating South African Lobogang Pilane. At the Olympics, he lost 5:9 to Pürevdorjiin Serdamba.

Serugo Ronald won a bronze medal in the All Africa Games 2011. After defeating Utoni Jafet of Namibia in the semi-finals. Won a gold medal in the Tammer international tournament in the flyweight category in 2011 in Finland.

Serugo returned to the Olympics in the 2016 Men's flyweight competition, losing a 2-1 decision to Armenia's Narek Abgaryan in the opening round.

== See also ==
- Uganda Boxing Federation
- Uganda at the Olympics
- Boxing at the 2008 Summer Olympics
