= Uganda Olympic Committee =

National Olympic Committee

- Country: Uganda
- Code: UGA
- Created: 1950
- Recognized: 1956
- Continental Association: ANOCA
- Headquarters: Kampala
- President: Donald Rukare
- Secretary General: Beatrice Ayikoru
- Website: Uganda Olympic Committee

The Uganda Olympic Committee (IOC code: UGA) is the National Olympic Committee representing Uganda. It was created in 1950 and officially recognised by the International Olympic Committee in 1956. The Uganda Olympics committee is the official National Olympic Committee for Uganda, which is responsible for managing the Olympic movement and co ordinating the country's participation in the Olympics. Its head quarters are found at Lugogo Sports Complex, Kampala, Uganda. The current President of the committee is Donald Rukare. November 2025, Donald Rukare was also elected as the President of Commonwealth Sport.

== Core function ==
The Uganda Olympic Committee primary roles are:

- Representing Uganda in the International Olympic Committee (IOC).
- Coordinating and overseeing Uganda's participation in the Olympic Games, Commonwealth Games, and other international events.
- Promoting Olympism and Olympic values within the country.
- Ensuring the observance of the Olympic Charter.
- Providing support for athlete development and training for coaches and administrators through programs like Olympic Solidarity.
- Adopting and implementing the World Anti-Doping Code.

== Executive committee members ==
The Uganda Olympic Committee executive committee includes:

Position	Name
President	Donald Rukare
First Vice President	Godwin Arinaitwe Kayangwe
Second Vice President	Moses Mwase
Secretary General	Beatrice Ayikoru
Treasurer	Sadik Nasiwu
Assistant Secretary General	Lydia Gloria Dhamuzungu
Executive Committee Members	Robert Jaggwe, Harriet Ayaa, Richard McBond Asiimwe, Anne Mungoma

== Presidents of the Committee ==
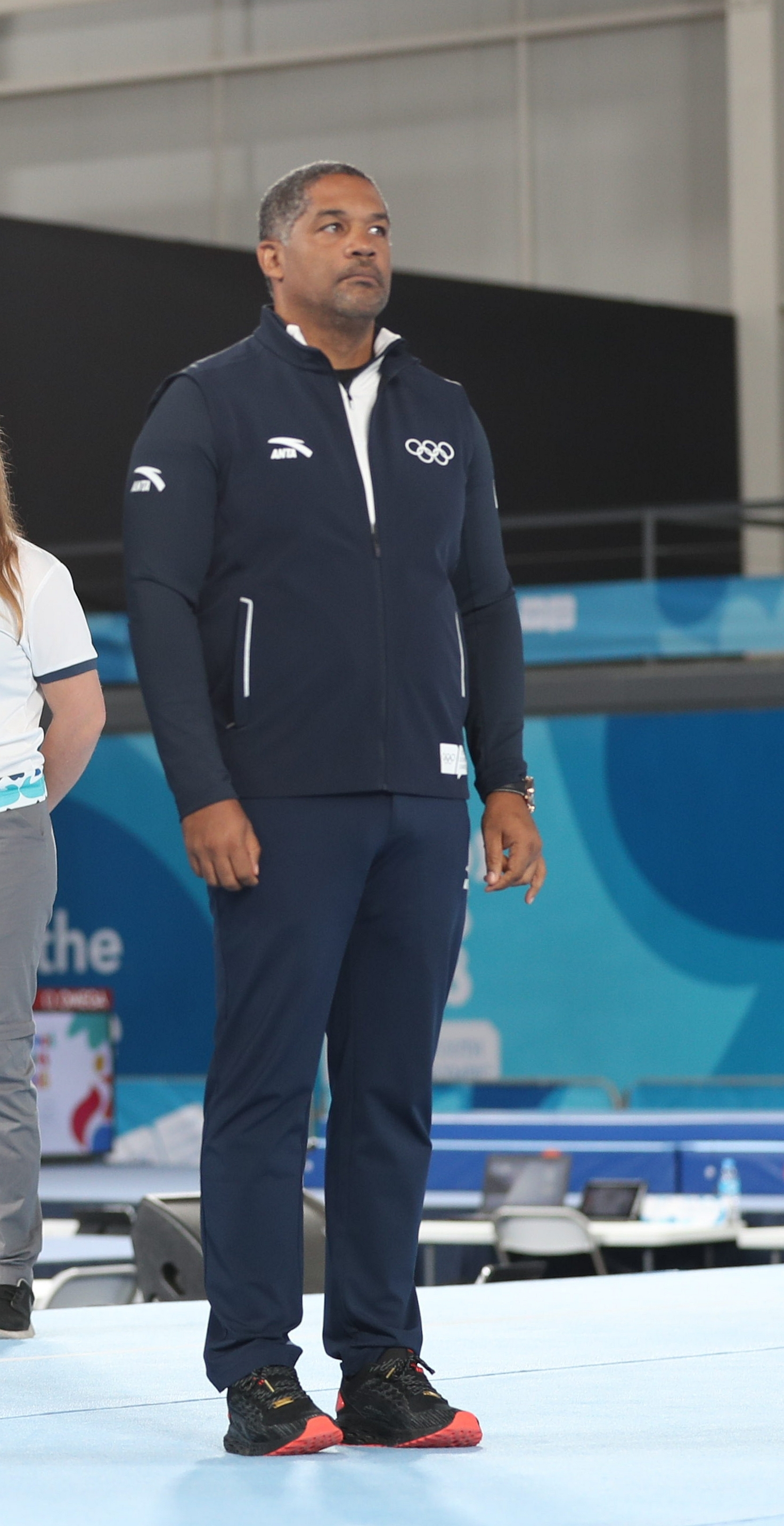
William Frederick Blick in his function as IOC member at a victory ceremony of the 2018 Summer Youth Olympics

- 1950–1958 – Richard Posnett
- 1971–2009 – Francis Nyangweso
- 2009–2012 – Roger Hans Ddungu
- 2013–2021 – William Frederick Blick
- 2021-present - Donald Rukare

== Olympic achievements ==
Ugandan athletes have consistently excelled in distance running and boxing. Notable medalists include:

Name	Sport	Medals Won (Examples)
Joshua Cheptegei	Athletics	2 Gold (2020, 2024), 2 Silver (2020, 2024)
Peruth Chemutai	Athletics	1 Gold (2020), 1 Silver (2024)
John Akii-Bua	Athletics	1 Gold (1972)
Stephen Kiprotich	Athletics	1 Gold (2012)
Leo Rwabwogo	Boxing	1 Silver (1972), 1 Bronze (1968)
Eridadi Mukwanga	Boxing	1 Silver (1968)
John Mugabi	Boxing	1 Silver (1980)

== See also ==
- Uganda at the Olympics
- Uganda at the Commonwealth Games
