= Uganda at the 2025 World Aquatics Championships =

- Flag of Uganda
- World Aquatics code: UGA
- National federation: Uganda Swimming Federation
- Website: ugandaswimming.org

in Singapore
- Competitors: 6 in 2 sports
- Medals: Gold 0 Silver 0 Bronze 0 Total 0

World Aquatics Championships appearances
- 1973; 1975; 1978; 1982; 1986; 1991; 1994; 1998; 2001; 2003; 2005; 2007; 2009; 2011; 2013; 2015; 2017; 2019; 2022; 2023; 2024; 2025

Uganda competed at the 2025 World Aquatics Championships in Singapore from July 11 to August 3, 2025.

== Competitors ==
The following is the list of competitors in the Championships.

Sport	Men	Women	Total
Open water swimming	1	1	2
Swimming	2	2	4
Total	3	3	6

== Open water swimming ==
Men

Athlete	Event	Heat		Semi-final		Final	
Athlete	Event	Time	Rank	Time	Rank	Time	Rank
Benjamin Lutaaya	Men's 5 km	—				Did not finish	

Women

Athlete	Event	Heat		Semi-final		Final	
Athlete	Event	Time	Rank	Time	Rank	Time	Rank
Swagiah Mubiru	Women's 5 km	—				Did not finish	

== Swimming ==
Uganda entered 4 swimmers.

Men

Athlete	Event	Heat		Semi-final		Final	
Athlete	Event	Time	Rank	Time	Rank	Time	Rank
Tendo Mukalazi	50 m freestyle	23.92	70	Did not advance			
Tendo Mukalazi	100 m freestyle	52.82	71	Did not advance			
Jesse Ssengonzil	50 m butterfly	24.32	48	Did not advance			
Jesse Ssengonzil	100 m butterfly	53.32 NR	41	Did not advance			

Women

Athlete	Event	Heat		Semi-final		Final	
Athlete	Event	Time	Rank	Time	Rank	Time	Rank
Gloria Muzito	50 m freestyle	25.76	38	Did not advance			
Gloria Muzito	100 m freestyle	56.04	34	Did not advance			
Kirabo Namutebi	50 m freestyle	26.10	43	Did not advance			
Kirabo Namutebi	50 m butterfly	29.55	64	Did not advance			

Mixed

Athlete	Event	Heat		Final	
Athlete	Event	Time	Rank	Time	Rank
Jesse Ssengonzi; Kirabo Namutebi; Gloria Muzito; Tendo Mukalazi	4 × 100 m freestyle relay	3:41.19	22	Did not advance	
Jesse Ssengonzi; Kirabo Namutebi; Gloria Muzito; Tendo Mukalazi	4 × 100 m medley relay	4:05.65 NR	25	Did not advance	
