= Uganda at the 2024 World Aquatics Championships =

- Flag of Uganda
- FINA code: UGA
- National federation: Uganda Swimming Federation
- Website: ugandaswimming.org

in Doha, Qatar
- Competitors: 6 in 2 sports
- Medals: Gold 0 Silver 0 Bronze 0 Total 0

World Aquatics Championships appearances
- 1973; 1975; 1978; 1982; 1986; 1991; 1994; 1998; 2001; 2003; 2005; 2007; 2009; 2011; 2013; 2015; 2017; 2019; 2022; 2023; 2024

Uganda competed at the 2024 World Aquatics Championships in Doha, Qatar from 2 to 18 February.

== Competitors ==
The following is the list of competitors in the Championships.

| Sport | Men | Women | Total |
|---|---|---|---|
| Open water swimming | 1 | 1 | 2 |
| Swimming | 2 | 2 | 4 |
| Total | 3 | 3 | 6 |

== Open water swimming ==
Men

| Athlete | Event | Time | Rank |
|---|---|---|---|
| Atuhaire Ambala | Men's 5 km | OTL | |

Women

| Athlete | Event | Time | Rank |
|---|---|---|---|
| Swagiah Mubiru | Women's 5 km | OTL | |

== Swimming ==
Uganda entered 4 swimmers.

Men

| Athlete | Event | Heat | | Semifinal | | Final | |
| Athlete | Event | Time | Rank | Time | Rank | Time | Rank |
|---|---|---|---|---|---|---|---|
| Tendo Mukalazi | 50 metre freestyle | 23.63 | 53 | Did not advance | | | |
| Tendo Mukalazi | 100 metre freestyle | 52.63 | 72 | Did not advance | | | |
| Jesse Ssengonzi | 50 metre butterfly | 24.41 | 38 | Did not advance | | | |
| Jesse Ssengonzi | 100 metre butterfly | 54.48 | 39 | Did not advance | | | |

Women

| Athlete | Event | Heat | | Semifinal | | Final | |
| Athlete | Event | Time | Rank | Time | Rank | Time | Rank |
|---|---|---|---|---|---|---|---|
| Gloria Muzito | 50 metre freestyle | 26.01 | 37 | Did not advance | | | |
| Gloria Muzito | 100 metre freestyle | 56.55 | 27 | Did not advance | | | |
| Kirabo Namutebi | 50 metre breaststroke | 33.71 | 34 | Did not advance | | | |
| Kirabo Namutebi | 50 metre butterfly | 29.62 | 42 | Did not advance | | | |

Mixed

| Athlete | Event | Heat | | Semifinal | | Final | |
| Athlete | Event | Time | Rank | Time | Rank | Time | Rank |
|---|---|---|---|---|---|---|---|
| Jesse Ssuubi Ssengonzi; Tendo Mukalazi; Kirabo Namutebi; Gloria Anna Muzito | 4 × 100 m freestyle relay | 3:40.35 | 11 | — | | Did not advance | |
| Jesse Ssuubi Ssengonzi; Tendo Mukalazi; Kirabo Namutebi; Gloria Anna Muzito | 4 × 100 m medley relay | 4:09.94 NR | 26 | — | | Did not advance | |
