= Sudan at the 2025 World Aquatics Championships =

- Flag of Sudan
- World Aquatics code: SUD
- National federation: Sudan Amateur Swimming Association

in Singapore
- Competitors: 4 in 2 sports
- Medals: Gold 0 Silver 0 Bronze 0 Total 0

World Aquatics Championships appearances
- 1973; 1975; 1978; 1982; 1986; 1991; 1994; 1998; 2001; 2003; 2005; 2007; 2009; 2011; 2013; 2015; 2017; 2019; 2022; 2023; 2024; 2025

Sudan competed at the 2025 World Aquatics Championships in Singapore from July 11 to August 3, 2025.

== Competitors ==
The following is the list of competitors in the Championships.

Sport	Men	Women	Total
Open water swimming	2	0	2
Swimming	2	0	2
Total	4	0	4

== Open water swimming ==
Men

Athlete	Event	Heat		Semi-final		Final	
Athlete	Event	Time	Rank	Time	Rank	Time	Rank
Adam Ahmed	Men's 10 km	—				OTL	
Gafar Hassan	Men's 10 km	—				2:28:03.9	62

== Swimming ==
Sudan entered 2 swimmers.

Men

Athlete	Event	Heat		Semi-final		Final	
Athlete	Event	Time	Rank	Time	Rank	Time	Rank
Abobakr Abass	50 m breaststroke	29.34	62	Did not advance			
Abobakr Abass	100 m breaststroke	1:05.79	59	Did not advance			
Yousif Ibrahim	50 m freestyle	25.87	93	Did not advance			
Yousif Ibrahim	100 m freestyle	57.35	94	Did not advance			
