= Uganda at the 2023 World Aquatics Championships =

- Flag of Uganda
- FINA code: UGA
- National federation: Uganda Swimming Federation
- Website: ugandaswimming.org

in Fukuoka, Japan
- Competitors: 6 in 2 sports
- Medals: Gold 0 Silver 0 Bronze 0 Total 0

World Aquatics Championships appearances
- 1973; 1975; 1978; 1982; 1986; 1991; 1994; 1998; 2001; 2003; 2005; 2007; 2009; 2011; 2013; 2015; 2017; 2019; 2022; 2023; 2024

Uganda is set to compete at the 2023 World Aquatics Championships in Fukuoka, Japan from 14 to 30 July.

== Open water swimming ==
Uganda entered 3 open water swimmers.

Men

Athlete	Event	Time	Rank
Adnan Kabuye	Men's 5 km	DNF	
Hayyan Kisitu	Men's 5 km	OTL	

Women

Athlete	Event	Time	Rank
Swagiah Mubiru	Women's 5 km	OTL	

== Swimming ==
Uganda entered 4 swimmers.

Men

Athlete	Event	Heat		Semifinal		Final	
Athlete	Event	Time	Rank	Time	Rank	Time	Rank
Adnan Kabuye	100 metre backstroke	1:05.57	61	Did not advance			
Adnan Kabuye	50 metre butterfly	26.54	70	Did not advance			
Tendo Mukalazi	50 metre freestyle	23.94	69	Did not advance			
Tendo Mukalazi	100 metre freestyle	52.56 NR	77	Did not advance			

Women

Athlete	Event	Heat		Semifinal		Final	
Athlete	Event	Time	Rank	Time	Rank	Time	Rank
Tara Naluwoza	50 metre butterfly	29.07	44	Did not advance			
Tara Naluwoza	100 metre butterfly	1:09.69	48	Did not advance			
Kirabo Namutebi	50 metre freestyle	26.54	50	Did not advance			
Kirabo Namutebi	100 metre freestyle	59.50	44	Did not advance			

Mixed

Athlete	Event	Heat		Final	
Athlete	Event	Time	Rank	Time	Rank
Tendo Mukalazi; Adnan Kabuye; Tara Naluwoza; Kirabo Namutebi	4 × 100 m freestyle relay	3:47.80	30	Did not advance	
Adnan Kabuye; Tendo Mukalazi; Tara Naluwoza; Kirabo Namutebi	4 × 100 m medley relay	4:19.70	31	Did not advance	
