= Uganda at the 2022 World Aquatics Championships =

- Flag of Uganda
- FINA code: UGA
- National federation: Uganda Swimming Association

in Budapest, Hungary
- Competitors: 5 in 2 sports
- Medals: Gold 0 Silver 0 Bronze 0 Total 0

World Aquatics Championships appearances
- 1973; 1975; 1978; 1982; 1986; 1991; 1994; 1998; 2001; 2003; 2005; 2007; 2009; 2011; 2013; 2015; 2017; 2019; 2022; 2023; 2024

Uganda competed at the 2022 World Aquatics Championships in Budapest, Hungary from 18 June to 3 July.

== Open water swimming ==
Athlete	Event	Time	Rank
Adnan Kabuye	Men's 5 km	OTL	
Karimah Katemba	Women's 5 km	OTL	

== Swimming ==
Athlete	Event	Heat		Semifinal		Final	
Athlete	Event	Time	Rank	Time	Rank	Time	Rank
Adnan Kabuye	Men's 100 m freestyle	DNS					
Adnan Kabuye	Men's 50 m backstroke	29.65	48	did not advance			
Tendo Mukalazi	Men's 50 m freestyle	24.58	67	did not advance			
Tendo Mukalazi	Men's 50 m breaststroke	30.03	47	did not advance			
Avice Meya	Women's 100 m freestyle	1:03.16	50	did not advance			
Avice Meya	Women's 50 m backstroke	32.94	36	did not advance			
Kirabo Namutebi	Women's 50 m freestyle	26.26	36	did not advance			
Kirabo Namutebi	Women's 50 m breaststroke	30.03	47	did not advance			
Adnan Kabuye; Avice Meya; Tendo Mukalazi; Kirabo Namutebi	4 × 100 m mixed freestyle relay	3:56.04	23	—		did not advance	
