= 2024 World Aquatics Swimming Championships (25 m) – Mixed 4 × 50 metre freestyle relay =

Swimming competition

Mixed 4 × 50 metre freestyle relay at the 2024 World Aquatics Swimming Championships (25 m)
- Venue: Duna Arena
- Location: Budapest, Hungary
- Dates: 13 December (heats and final)
- Teams: 33
- Winning time: 1:28.50

Medalists
gold medal	Italy
silver medal	Canada
bronze medal	Poland

The mixed 4 × 50 metre freestyle relay event at the 2024 World Aquatics Swimming Championships (25 m) was held on 13 December 2024 at the Duna Arena in Budapest, Hungary.

== Records ==
Prior to the competition, the existing world and championship records were as follows.

World record	France (FRA)	1:27.33	Melbourne, Australia	16 December 2022
Competition record	France (FRA)	1:27.33	Melbourne, Australia	16 December 2022

== Background ==
France, the reigning world record holders, did not enter a team despite returning three legs from their 2022 victory. That left Australia, the USA, Italy, and Neutral Athletes B team as the likely contenders. Australia raced without Kyle Chalmers and Emma McKeon but leaned on Isaac Cooper and Alexandria Perkins. The U.S. introduced Gretchen Walsh and Kate Douglass to a new lineup anchored by Jack Alexy and Chris Guiliano. Italy returned with a strong male trio—Alessandro Miressi, Leonardo Deplano, and Lorenzo Zazzeri—supported by the rising Sara Curtis. The Neutral Athletes B team featured the Russian athletes Arina Surkova and Egor Kornev. Hungary relied on Nándor Németh and Szebasztián Szabó, though lacked depth on the women’s side.

SwimSwam wrote that predicting the winners of the mixed relays was "nigh impossible" due to the amount of variables. They predicted USA would win, Australia would come second and Italy would come third.

== Results ==
=== Heats ===
The heats were started at 9:02.

Rank	Heat	Lane	Nation	Swimmers	Time	Notes
1	5	4	Italy	Leonardo Deplano (21.08); Lorenzo Zazzeri (21.25); Silvia Di Pietro (23.71); Sara Curtis (23.42)	1:29.46	Q
2	5	3	Neutral Athletes B	Dmitrii Zhavoronkov (21.63); Pavel Samusenko (20.56); Alina Gaifutdinova (24.09); Daria Trofimova (23.66)	1:29.94	Q
3	3	6	Poland	Piotr Ludwiczak (21.34); Kamil Sieradzki (21.27); Kornelia Fiedkiewicz (24.07); Katarzyna Wasick (23.46)	1:30.14	Q
4	2	8	Canada	Finlay Knox (21.69); Yuri Kisil (20.65); Penny Oleksiak (24.10); Mary-Sophie Harvey (23.79)	1:30.23	Q
5	4	4	Netherlands	Nyls Korstanje (21.21); Thomas Verhoeven (21.69); Maaike De Waard (23.76); Milou Van Wijk (23.87)	1:30.53	Q
6	4	3	Norway	Bjoernar Laskerud (21.28); Nicholas Lia (21.17); Mari Moen (24.02); Hedda Oritsland (24.42)	1:30.89	Q
7	4	8	Hong Kong	Ian Yentou Ho (21.13); Ralph Yat Ho Koo (21.73); Siobhán Haughey (23.87); Li Sum Yiu (24.21)	1:30.94	Q
8	5	5	Slovakia	Matej Duša (21.55); Tibor Tistan (21.18); Teresa Ivan (24.19); Lillian Slusna (24.08)	1:31.00	Q, NR
9	3	3	United States	Michael Andrew (21.27); Matt King (21.23); Claire Weinstein (24.49); Alex Shackell (24.09)	1:31.08	R
10	2	4	Japan	Masahiro Kawane (21.50); Kaiya Seki (21.12); Yume Jinno (24.10); Mizuki Hirai (24.37)	1:31.09	R
11	4	7	Germany	Artem Selin (21.76); Martin Wrede (21.49); Nina Jazy (23.97); Nele Schulze (24.04)	1:31.26	
12	1	4	Spain	Sergio de Celis Montalban (21.63); Nacho Campos Beas (21.34); Carmen Weiler Sastre (24.41); Maria Daza Garcia (24.26)	1:31.64	NR
13	4	5	Sweden	Robin Hanson (21.61); Elias Persson (21.53); Klara Thormalm (24.47); Sofia Aastedt (24.44)	1:32.05	
14	3	4	Hungary	Benedek Andor (22.36); Boldizsar Magda (21.26); Kiara Pozvai (24.29); Petra Senánszky (24.22)	1:32.13	
15	3	8	South Korea	Kim Jihun (21.66); Ji Yuchan (20.9); Jeong Soeun (25.09); Hur Yeonkyung (24.52)	1:32.17	NR
16	5	8	New Zealand	Jack Hendy (22.04); Hugo Wrathall (22.09); Zoe Pedersen (24.34); Emma Godwin (24.27)	1:32.74	
17	2	7	South Africa	Chris Smith (21.80); Kris Mihaylov (22.44); Caitlin De Lange (24.42); Jessica Thompson (24.61)	1:33.27	
18	1	6	China	Zhao Jiayue (22.13); Jiang Chenglin (22.30); Liu Shuhan (24.20); Xie Ziqi (24.66)	1:33.29	
19	5	1	Iceland	Simon Statkevicius (22.04); Gudmundur Leo Rafnsson (22.61); Johanna Elin Gudmundsdottir (25.16); Snaefridur Sol Jorunnardottir (24.31)	1:34.12	NR
20	1	5	Peru	Anthony Puertas (22.62); Rafael Ponce (22.06); Alexia Sotomayor (25.80); Rafaela Fernandini (25.48)	1:35.96	
21	1	3	Uganda	Tendo Kaumi (23.75); Tendo Mukalazi (22.76); Gloria Anna Muzito (24.74); Kirabo Namutebi (24.75)	1:36.00	NR
22	2	5	Thailand	Pongpanod Trithan (22.99); Surasit Thongdeang (22.88); Jinjutha Pholjamjumrus (26.74); Jenjira Srisa-Ard (24.31)	1:36.92	
23	5	2	Kenya	Haniel Kudwoli (23.70); Sara Mose (25.16); Imara Bella Patricia Thorpe (25.53); Stephen Nyoike (23.14)	1:37.53	NR
24	2	3	Dominican Republic	Josué Domínguez (23.01); Elizabeth Jimenez (26.08); Darielys Ortiz (26.77); Javier Núñez (21.99)	1:37.85	
25	2	6	Jamaica	Sidrell Williams (23.86); Nathaniel Thomas (22.22); Jessica Calderbank (26.77); Leanna Wainwright (26.66)	1:39.51	
26	2	1	Namibia	Oliver Durand (23.01); Molina Smalley (27.48); Jessica Humphrey (26.98); Ronan Wantenaar (22.21)	1:39.68	NR
27	5	6	Samoa	Kokoro Frost (23.39); Hector Langkilde (22.36); Kaiya Brown (27.73); Paige Schendelaar-Kemp (26.28)	1:39.76	
28	4	1	Albania	Grisi Koxhaku (22.41); Kaltra Meca (28.26); Stella Gjoka (27.85); Reidi Resuli (22.73)	1:41.25	
29	1	2	North Korea	Kim Ryong Hyon (24.47); Kim Sol Song (25.88); Pak Mi Song (25.62); Kim Won Ju (25.56)	1:41.53	
30	5	7	Madagascar	Baritiana Andriampenomanana (26.23); Jonathan Raharvel (24.66); Idealy Tendrinavalona (27.39); Antsa Rabejaona (26.06)	1:44.34	NR
	4	2	Australia		Did not start	
	2	2	Maldives	Mohamed Aan Hussain (23.45); Hamna Ahmed (30.10); Meral Ayn Latheef (28.77); Mohamed Rihan Shiham	Disqualified	
	4	6	Kazakhstan	Gleb Kovaleyna (21.76); Adilbek Mussin (21.39); Sofia Spodarenko; Xeniya Ignatova	Disqualified	

=== Final ===
The final was held at 17:32.

Rank	Lane	Nation	Swimmers	Time	Notes
1st place, gold medalist(s)	4	Italy	Leonardo Deplano (20.80); Alessandro Miressi (21.01); Silvia Di Pietro (23.35); Sara Curtis (23.34)	1:28.50	
2nd place, silver medalist(s)	6	Canada	Ilya Kharun (20.80); Yuri Kisil (20.57); Ingrid Wilm (23.72); Mary-Sophie Harvey (23.51)	1:28.60	
3rd place, bronze medalist(s)	3	Poland	Piotr Ludwiczak (21.31); Kamil Sieradzki (20.89); Kornelia Fiedkiewicz (23.70); Katarzyna Wasick (22.90)	1:28.80	NR
4	5	Neutral Athletes B	Egor Kornev (20.88); Roman Shevliakov (21.22); Arina Surkova (23.04); Daria Trofimova (23.81)	1:28.95	
5	2	Netherlands	Nyls Korstanje (21.10); Thomas Verhoeven (21.37); Maaike De Waard (23.77); Milou Van Wijk (23.62)	1:29.86	
6	8	Slovakia	Matej Duša (21.24); Tibor Tistan (21.18); Teresa Ivan (23.91); Lillian Slusna (24.03)	1:30.36	NR
7	1	Hong Kong	Ian Yentou Ho (21.08); Ralph Yat Ho Koo (21.80); Siobhán Haughey (23.52); Li Sum Yiu (24)	1:30.40	NR
8	7	Norway	Bjoernar Laskerud (21.27); Nicholas Lia (21.02); Mari Moen (24.21); Hedda Oritsland (24.47)	1:30.97	
