= Uganda at the 2015 World Aquatics Championships =

- Flag of Uganda
- World Aquatics code: UGA
- National federation: Uganda Swimming Federation
- Website: www.ugandaswimming.org

in Kazan, Russia
- Competitors: 3 in 1 sport
- Medals: Gold 0 Silver 0 Bronze 0 Total 0

World Aquatics Championships appearances
- 1973; 1975; 1978; 1982; 1986; 1991; 1994; 1998; 2001; 2003; 2005; 2007; 2009; 2011; 2013; 2015; 2017; 2019; 2022; 2023; 2024; 2025

Uganda competed at the 2015 World Aquatics Championships in Kazan, Russia from 24 July to 9 August 2015.

== Swimming ==
Ugandan swimmers have achieved qualifying standards in the following events (up to a maximum of 2 swimmers in each event at the A-standard entry time, and 1 at the B-standard):

Men

Athlete	Event	Heat		Semifinal		Final	
Athlete	Event	Time	Rank	Time	Rank	Time	Rank
Arnold Kisulo	50 m backstroke	29.98	61	did not advance			
Arnold Kisulo	100 m backstroke	1:06.14	65	did not advance			
Ekirikubinza Tibatemwa	50 m freestyle	25.54	80	did not advance			
Ekirikubinza Tibatemwa	50 m breaststroke	33.00 NR	64	did not advance			

Women

Athlete	Event	Heat		Semifinal		Final	
Athlete	Event	Time	Rank	Time	Rank	Time	Rank
Jamila Lunkuse	50 m breaststroke	34.93	53	did not advance			
Jamila Lunkuse	100 m breaststroke	1:17.23	56	did not advance			
