= Uganda at the 2013 World Aquatics Championships =

- Flag of Uganda
- World Aquatics code: UGA
- National federation: Uganda Swimming Federation
- Website: www.ugandaswimming.org

in Barcelona, Spain
- Competitors: 3 in 1 sport
- Medals: Gold 0 Silver 0 Bronze 0 Total 0

World Aquatics Championships appearances
- 1973; 1975; 1978; 1982; 1986; 1991; 1994; 1998; 2001; 2003; 2005; 2007; 2009; 2011; 2013; 2015; 2017; 2019; 2022; 2023; 2024; 2025

Uganda competed at the 2013 World Aquatics Championships in Barcelona, Spain between 19 July and 4 August 2013.

== Swimming ==
Ugandan swimmers earned qualifying standards in the following events (up to a maximum of 2 swimmers in each event at the A-standard entry time, and 1 at the B-standard):

Men

Athlete	Event	Heat		Semifinal		Final	
Athlete	Event	Time	Rank	Time	Rank	Time	Rank
Arnold Kisulo	50 m freestyle	28.41	93	did not advance			
Arnold Kisulo	50 m backstroke	31.08	44	did not advance			
Ekirkubinza Tibatemwa	50 m breaststroke	33.85	70	did not advance			

Women

Athlete	Event	Heat		Semifinal		Final	
Athlete	Event	Time	Rank	Time	Rank	Time	Rank
Jamila Lunkuse	100 m freestyle	1:01.25	60	did not advance			
Jamila Lunkuse	100 m breaststroke	1:16.15	52	did not advance			
