= List of Ugandan records in swimming =

The Ugandan records in swimming are the fastest ever performances of swimmers from Uganda, which are recognised and ratified by the Uganda Swimming Federation (USF).

All records were set in finals unless noted otherwise.

== Long course (50 m) ==
=== Men ===
Event	Time		Name	Club	Date	Meet	Location	Ref
50 m freestyle	22.40	sf	Tendo Kaumi	Stipendium Hungaricum	19 April 2026	Hungarian Championships	Sopron, Hungary	
100 m freestyle	51.14	rh	Tendo Kaumi	Uganda	25 July 2026	Commonwealth Games	Glasgow, United Kingdom	
200 m freestyle	2:00.51	h	Atuhaire Ambala	Bisp Flying Fish	20 June 2019	Singaporean Championships	Singapore, Singapore	
400 m freestyle	4:16.74	h	Heer Usadadiya	Rackley	16 April 2026	Australian Age Championships	Gold Coast, Australia	
800 m freestyle	9:02.86		Heer Usadadiya	Uganda	1 May 2025	African Junior Championships	Cairo, Egypt	
1500 m freestyle	17:54.83	h	Atuhaire Ambala	Uganda	30 March 2017	African Junior Championships	Egypt	
50 m backstroke	27.01	h	Tendo Kaumi	Uganda	24 July 2026	Commonwealth Games	Glasgow, United Kingdom	
100 m backstroke	57.27	rh	Tendo Kaumi	Uganda	29 July 2026	Commonwealth Games	Glasgow, United Kingdom	
200 m backstroke	2:12.80	h	Heer Usadadiya	Rackley	18 April 2025	Australian Age Championships	Brisbane, Australia	
50 m breaststroke	29.39		Tendo Mukalazi	Stipendium Hungaricum	1 February 2026	Budapest Cup	Budapest, Hungary	
100 m breaststroke	1:06.91	h	Jordan Ssamula	Nepean Kanata Barracudas	10 July 2025	Ontario Championships	Toronto, Canada	
200 m breaststroke	2:29.09	h	Jordan Ssamula	Nepean Kanata Barracudas	12 July 2025	Ontario Championships	Toronto, Canada	
50 m butterfly	24.22		Jesse Ssuubi Ssengonzi	Uganda	9 November 2025	Islamic Solidarity Games	Riyadh, Saudi Arabia	
100 m butterfly	53.30	sf	Jesse Ssuubi Ssengonzi	Uganda	11 November 2025	Islamic Solidarity Games	Riyadh, Saudi Arabia	
200 m butterfly	2:10.48		Jesse Ssuubi Ssengonzi	Marlins Of Raleigh	17 May 2019	Atlanta Classic Swim Meet	Atlanta, United States	
200 m individual medley	2:12.94	h	Jesse Ssuubi Ssengonzi	Marlins Of Raleigh	17 May 2019	Atlanta Classic Swim Meet	Atlanta, United States	
400 m individual medley	5:03.36	h	Ambala Atuhaire Ogola	Uganda	20 July 2017	Commonwealth Youth Games	Nassau, Bahamas	
4×50 m freestyle relay	1:40.26			Uganda	19 October 2025	Africa Aquatics Zone III Championships	Nairobi, Kenya	
4×100 m freestyle relay	3:32.47	h	Tendo Kaumi (51.94); Jordan Ssamula (55.89); Jesse Ssengonzi (52.01); Tendo Mukalazi (52.63)	Uganda	24 July 2026	Commonwealth Games	Glasgow, United Kingdom	
4×200 m freestyle relay								
4×50 m medley relay	1:54.74			Uganda	16 October 2025	Africa Aquatics Zone III Championships	Nairobi, Kenya	
4×100 m medley relay	3:52.02	h	Tendo Kaumi (57.27); Jordan Ssamula (1:08.35); Jesse Ssengonzi (54.22); Tendo Mukalazi (52.18)	Uganda	29 July 2026	Commonwealth Games	Glasgow, United Kingdom	

Legend: # – Record awaiting ratification by USF; WR – World record; AF – African record; e – equalled existing record;
Records not set in finals: h – heat; sf – semifinal; r – relay 1st leg; rh – relay heat 1st leg; b – B final; † – en route to final mark; so – swim-off; tt – time trial

=== Women ===
Event	Time		Name	Club	Date	Meet	Location	Ref
50 m freestyle	25.29		Gloria Muzito	Stipendium Hungaricum	19 April 2026	Hungarian Championships	Sopron, Hungary	
100 m freestyle	55.26		Gloria Muzito	Uganda	11 November 2025	Islamic Solidarity Games	Riyadh, Saudi Arabia	
200 m freestyle	2:03.70		Gloria Muzito	Uganda	6 May 2026	African Championships	Oran, Algeria	
400 m freestyle	4:40.42		Esther Nabirye	Dolphins	-	Uganda		
800 m freestyle	10:00.51		Peyton Suubi	Uganda	16 December 2025	African Youth Games	Luanda, Angola	
1500 m freestyle								
50m backstroke	31.72	h	Avice Meya	Uganda	16 August 2022	Islamic Solidarity Games	Konya, Turkey	
100m backstroke	1:10.24		Avice Meya	Uganda	14 August 2022	Islamic Solidarity Games	Konya, Turkey	
200m backstroke	2:42.09		Zara Marie Mbanga	Jaguar	-	Uganda		
50m breaststroke	32.99		Kirabo Namutebi	Uganda	3 May 2024	African Championships	Luanda, Angola	
100m breaststroke	1:15.11	h	Jamila Lunkuse	Uganda	27 July 2014	Commonwealth Games	Glasgow, Great Britain	
200m breaststroke	2:49.46		Peyton Suubi	Uganda	18 December 2025	African Youth Games	Luanda, Angola	
50m butterfly	27.61		Gloria Muzito	Uganda	6 May 2026	African Championships	Oran, Algeria	
100m butterfly	1:05.16	h	Rebecca Ssengonzi	Uganda	23 August 2019	African Games	Casablanca, Morocco	
200m butterfly	2:34.24	h	Rebecca Ssengonzi	Uganda	21 August 2019	African Games	Casablanca, Morocco	
200m individual medley	2:33.95		Charlotte Sanford	Sailfish	18 March 2023	Team Luton March Meet	Uganda	
400m individual medley	5:59.93		Mackayla Ssali	Dolphins	29 May 2026	Kenyan Championships	Nairobi, Kenya	
4×50 m freestyle relay	1:56.59			Uganda	19 October 2025	Africa Aquatics Zone III Championships	Nairobi, Kenya	
4×100 m freestyle relay	4:25.59			Uganda	October 2025	Africa Aquatics Zone III Championships	Nairobi, Kenya	
4×200 m freestyle relay								
4×50 m medley relay	2:16.41			Uganda	16 October 2025	Africa Aquatics Zone III Championships	Nairobi, Kenya	
4×100 m medley relay								

Legend: # – Record awaiting ratification by USF; WR – World record; AF – African record; e – equalled existing record;
Records not set in finals: h – heat; sf – semifinal; r – relay 1st leg; rh – relay heat 1st leg; b – B final; † – en route to final mark; so – swim-off; tt – time trial

=== Mixed relay ===
Event	Time		Name	Club	Date	Meet	Location	Ref
4×50 m freestyle relay	1:47.72			Uganda	17 October 2025	Africa Aquatics Zone III Championships	Nairobi, Kenya	
4×100 m freestyle relay	3:37.11	h	Tendo Kaumi (51.14); Jesse Ssengonzi (51.24); Gloria Muzito (55.69); Kirabo Namutebi (59.04)	Uganda	25 July 2026	Commonwealth Games	Glasgow, United Kingdom	
4×50 m medley relay	2:03.97			Uganda	17 October 2025	Africa Aquatics Zone III Championships	Nairobi, Kenya	
4×100 m medley relay	4:05.65	h	Kirabo Namutebi (1:09.52); Tendo Mukalazi (1:06.78); Jesse Ssengonzi (53.55); Gloria Muzito (55.80)	Uganda	30 July 2025	World Championships	Singapore, Singapore	

Legend: # – Record awaiting ratification by USF; WR – World record; AF – African record; e – equalled existing record;
Records not set in finals: h – heat; so – swim-off

== Short course (25 m) ==
=== Men ===
Event	Time		Name	Club	Date	Meet	Location	Ref
50 m freestyle	22.20	h, =	Tendo Kaumi	Stipendium Hungaricum	5 November 2026	Hungarian Championships	Kaposvár, Hungary	
50 m freestyle	22.20	=	Tendo Kaumi	Stipendium Hungaricum	5 November 2026	Hungarian Championships	Kaposvár, Hungary	
100 m freestyle	49.28	h	Jesse Ssengonzi	Uganda	18 October 2025	World Cup	Westmont, United States	
200 m freestyle	1:56.82	h	Tendo Mukalazi	MÚSZ	3 November 2023	Hungarian Championships	Debrecen, Hungary	
400 m freestyle	4:14.90		Heer Usadadiya	Uganda	23 November 2023	Africa Aquatics Zone III Championships	Bujumbura, Burkina Faso	
800 m freestyle	8:46.18		Heer Usadadiya	Uganda	22 November 2023	Africa Aquatics Zone III Championships	Bujumbura, Burkina Faso	
1500 m freestyle	17:48.18		Heer Usadadiya	Gators	24 September 2023	USF League 3 Championships	Kampala, Uganda	
50m backstroke	25.96	h	Tendo Kaumi	Stipendium Hungaricum	4 November 2026	Hungarian Championships	Kaposvár, Hungary	
100m backstroke	56.36		Tendo Kaumi	Dolphins	2 July 2026	Ugandan Championships	Kampala, Uganda	
200m backstroke	2:09.51		Tendo Kaumi	Dolphins	2 July 2025	Ugandan Championships	Kampala, Uganda	
50m breaststroke	28.45		Tendo Mukalazi	Aqua Akii	2 July 2026	Ugandan Championships	Kampala, Uganda	
100m breaststroke	1:03.35	h	Jordan Ssamula	Nepean Kanata Barracudas	8 August 2025	Canadian Championships	Sherbrooke, Canada	
200m breaststroke	2:23.16	h	Jordan Ssamula	Nepean Kanata Barracudas	10 August 2025	Canadian Championships	Sherbrooke, Canada	
50m butterfly	23.79	h	Jesse Ssengonzi	Uganda	13 December 2022	World Championships	Melbourne, Australia	
100m butterfly	51.90	h	Jesse Ssengonzi	Uganda	17 December 2022	World Championships	Melbourne, Australia	
200m butterfly	2:18.70		Heer Usadadiya	Aqua Akii	2 July 2025	Ugandan Championships	Kampala, Uganda	
100m individual medley	56.83	h	Tendo Kaumi	Stipendium Hungaricum	7 November 2026	Hungarian Championships	Kaposvár, Hungary	
200m individual medley	2:08.19	h	Jordan Ssamula	Nepean Kanata Barracudas	11 December 2025	Ontario Junior International	Toronto, Canada	
400m individual medley	4:57.99		Jordan Ssamula	Nepean Kanata Barracudas	19 November 2023	NKB Fall Distance Time Trial	Toronto, Canada	
4×50m freestyle relay	1:48.88		Tendo Mukalazi; Emitu Alvin; Kabuye Adnan; Samora Byansi	Uganda	20 October 2017	CANA Zone III Championships	Dar es Salaam, Tanzania	
4×100m freestyle relay	3:44.26		Tendo Kaumi; Pendo Kaumi; Ethani Ssengooba; Tebi Nyanzi	Uganda	25 November 2023	Africa Aquatics Zone III Championships	Kigali, Rwanda	
4×200m freestyle relay								
4×50m medley relay								
4×100m medley relay								

Legend: # – Record awaiting ratification by USF; WR – World record; AF – African record; e – equalled existing record;
Records not set in finals: h – heat; sf – semifinal; r – relay 1st leg; rh – relay heat 1st leg; b – B final; † – en route to final mark; so – swim-off; tt – time trial

=== Women ===
Event	Time		Name	Club	Date	Meet	Location	Ref
50 m freestyle	24.79		Gloria Muzito	Stipendium Hungaricum	5 November 2026	Hungarian Championships	Kaposvár, Hungary	
100 m freestyle	53.49		Gloria Muzito	Stipendium Hungaricum	4 November 2026	Hungarian Championships	Kaposvár, Hungary	
200 m freestyle	2:11.01		Zara Marie Mbanga	Jaguar	-	-	Uganda	
400 m freestyle	4:45.68		Peyton Suubi	Uganda	23 November 2024	Africa Aquatics Zone III Championships	Bujumbura, Burkina Faso	
800 m freestyle	9:48.96		Charlotte Sanford	Sailfish	20 November 2021	SE Suffolk County Long Distance Qualifier A	Uganda	
1500 m freestyle	18:32.38		Peyton Suubi	-		Uganda		
50m backstroke	30.35	h	Avice Meya	National Aquatic Centre	12 December 2025	Irish Championships	Dublin, Ireland	
100m backstroke	1:10.10		Tyrah Muganzi	Gliders	-	-	Uganda	
200m backstroke	2:31.16		Zara Marie Mbanga	Jaguar	-	-	Uganda	
50m breaststroke	32.47	h	Kirabo Namutebi	Uganda	17 December 2022	World Championships	Melbourne, Australia	
100m breaststroke	1:15.55		Charlotte Sanford	-	6 November 2021	SE East Region Championships	Great Britain	
200m breaststroke	2:43.13		Charlotte Sanford	-	6 November 2021	SE East Region Championships	United Kingdom	
50m butterfly	27.59	b	Gloria Muzito	Stipendium Hungaricum	6 November 2026	Hungarian Championships	Kaposvár, Hungary	
100m butterfly	1:05.28	h	Tara Naluwoza	Uganda	17 December 2022	World Championships	Melbourne, Australia	
200m butterfly	2:34.52		Tara Kisawuzi	Altona	-	Uganda		
100m individual medley	1:07.48		Kirabo Namutebi	Gators	25 February 2023	National Swimming League	Kampala, Uganda	
200m individual medley	2:28.89		Charlotte Sanford	Sailfish	3 December 2022	Great Yarmouth SC Winter Wipeout	Uganda	
400 m individual medley	5:18.18		Charlotte Sanford	Sailfish	3 December 2022	Great Yarmouth SC Winter Wipeout	Uganda	
4×50m freestyle relay	2:16.83		Hannat Nakimuli; Athieno Diana; Racheal Galinda; Meya Avice	Uganda	20 October 2017	CANA Zone III Championships	Dar es Salaam, Tanzania	
4×100m freestyle relay	4:34.26			Uganda	25 November 2023	Africa Aquatics Zone III Championships	Kigali, Rwanda	
4×200 m freestyle relay								
4×50 m medley relay								
4×100 m medley relay								

Legend: # – Record awaiting ratification by USF; WR – World record; AF – African record; e – equalled existing record;
Records not set in finals: h – heat; sf – semifinal; r – relay 1st leg; rh – relay heat 1st leg; b – B final; † – en route to final mark; so – swim-off; tt – time trial

=== Mixed relay ===
Event	Time		Name	Club	Date	Meet	Location	Ref
4×50 m freestyle relay	1:36.00	h	Tendo Kaumi (23.75); Tendo Mukalazi (22.76); Gloria Muzito (24.74); Kirabo Namutebi (24.75)	Uganda	13 December 2024	World Championships	Budapest, Hungary	
4×50 m medley relay	1:49.23	h	Tendo Kaumi (27.40); Tendo Mukalazi (28.48); Kirabo Namutebi (28.94); Gloria Muzito (24.41)	Uganda	11 December 2024	World Championships	Budapest, Hungary	
4×100 m medley relay	4:06.20	h	Kirabo Namutebi (1:07.61); Tendo Mukalazi (1:04.06); Tendo Kaumi (59.94); Gloria Muzito (54.59)	Uganda	14 December 2024	World Championships	Budapest, Hungary	

Legend: # – Record awaiting ratification by USF; e – equalled existing record;
Records not set in finals: h – heat; so – swim-off
