= Swimming at the 2013 World Aquatics Championships – Men's 50 metre backstroke =

Men's 50 metre backstroke at the 2013 World Aquatics Championships
- Venue: Palau Sant Jordi
- Dates: August 3, 2013 (heats & semifinals); August 4, 2013 (final)
- Competitors: 52 from 47 nations
- Winning time: 24.42

Medalists
gold medal	Camille Lacourt	France
silver medal	Jérémy Stravius	France
silver medal	Matt Grevers	United States

Barcelona Palau San Jordi

The men's 50 metre backstroke event in swimming at the 2013 World Aquatics Championships took place on 3–4 August at the Palau Sant Jordi in Barcelona, Spain.

== Records ==
Prior to this competition, the existing world and championship records were:

World record	Liam Tancock (GBR)	24.04	Rome, Italy	2 August 2009
Competition record	Liam Tancock (GBR)	24.04	Rome, Italy	2 August 2009

== Results ==
=== Heats ===
The heats were held at 10:18.

Rank	Heat	Lane	Name	Nationality	Time	Notes
1	6	5	Daniel Orzechowski	Brazil	24.67	Q
2	4	5	Aschwin Wildeboer	Spain	24.72	Q
3	5	4	Jérémy Stravius	France	24.79	Q
4	5	3	Gerhard Zandberg	South Africa	24.85	Q
5	6	4	David Plummer	United States	24.91	Q
6	5	5	Bastiaan Lijesen	Netherlands	24.94	Q
7	4	4	Camille Lacourt	France	24.97	Q
8	5	7	Sun Xiaolei	China	25.01	Q
8	5	6	Guy Barnea	Israel	25.01	Q
10	6	3	Matt Grevers	United States	25.08	Q
11	5	8	Lavrans Solli	Norway	25.15	Q, NR
12	6	6	Jonatan Kopelev	Israel	25.17	Q
13	6	7	Ashley Delaney	Australia	25.36	Q
14	6	2	Pavel Sankovich	Belarus	25.40	Q
15	6	1	Federico Grabich	Argentina	25.44	Q
16	5	2	Juan Miguel Rando	Spain	25.52	Q
17	4	3	Mirco di Tora	Italy	25.54	
18	4	7	Gareth Kean	New Zealand	25.62	
19	6	8	I Gede Siman Sudartawa	Indonesia	25.68	
20	4	8	Alexis Santos	Portugal	25.78	NR
21	4	2	Cheng Feiyi	China	25.83	
22	4	1	Shin Hee-Wong	South Korea	25.84	
23	4	9	Felix Wolf	Germany	25.90	
24	4	0	Charles Francis	Canada	26.10	
25	5	1	Guven Duvan	Turkey	26.25	
26	3	4	Martin Baďura	Czech Republic	26.26	
27	5	9	Bilal Achelhi	Morocco	26.27	
28	6	0	Péter Bernek	Hungary	26.36	
29	5	0	Alexandr Tarabrin	Kazakhstan	26.39	
30	3	5	Charles Hockin	Paraguay	26.41	=NR
31	6	9	Mohamed Khaled	Egypt	26.44	
32	3	6	Artiom Gladun	Moldova	26.93	
33	3	2	Jordan Augier	Saint Lucia	27.16	NR
34	3	1	Ngou Pok Man	Macau	27.18	
35	3	7	Heshan Unamboowe	Sri Lanka	27.23	
36	3	3	Khachik Plavchyan	Armenia	27.97	NR
37	3	9	Hamdan Bayusuf	Kenya	28.20	
38	2	8	Mathieu Marquet	Mauritius	28.54	
39	3	0	Eisner Barberena	Nicaragua	28.71	
40	2	5	Maroun Waked	Lebanon	29.31	
41	2	3	Pablo Feo Mato	Andorra	29.47	
42	2	6	Erdenemunkh Demuul	Mongolia	29.82	
43	2	4	Victor Torres	U.S. Virgin Islands	30.01	
44	2	2	Arnold Kisulo	Uganda	31.08	
45	2	0	Umarkhon Alizoda	Tajikistan	33.37	
46	2	9	Storm Hablich	Saint Vincent and the Grenadines	34.20	
47	1	3	Miraj Prajapati	Nepal	34.74	
48	1	5	Ebrahim Al-Maleki	Yemen	34.84	
49	1	2	Awoussou Ablam	Benin	35.85	
50	2	7	Hamidou Seydou Lansina	Niger	36.65	
51	1	6	Sahr James	Sierra Leone	37.36	
	3	8	Samson Opuakpo	Nigeria		DSQ
	1	4	Abdelrahim Mohamed Abdelrahim	Sudan		DNS
	2	1	Louis Croenen	Belgium		DNS
	4	6	Ryosuke Irie	Japan		DNS

=== Semifinals ===
The semifinals were held at 19.15.

==== Semifinal 1 ====
Rank	Lane	Name	Nationality	Time	Notes
1	6	Guy Barnea	Israel	24.73	Q
2	2	Matt Grevers	United States	24.79	Q
3	4	Aschwin Wildeboer	Spain	24.90	Q
4	7	Jonatan Kopelev	Israel	24.95	Q
5	3	Bastiaan Lijesen	Netherlands	24.99	
6	5	Gerhard Zandberg	South Africa	25.24	
7	8	Juan Miguel Rando	Spain	25.28	
8	1	Pavel Sankovich	Belarus	25.36	

==== Semifinal 2 ====
Rank	Lane	Name	Nationality	Time	Notes
1	6	Camille Lacourt	France	24.39	Q
2	5	Jérémy Stravius	France	24.45	Q
3	4	Daniel Orzechowski	Brazil	24.79	Q
4	2	Sun Xiaolei	China	24.95	Q
5	8	Federico Grabich	Argentina	25.16	
6	7	Lavrans Solli	Norway	25.18	
7	1	Ashley Delaney	Australia	25.21	
8	3	David Plummer	United States	26.00	

=== Final ===
The final was held at 18:02.

Rank	Lane	Name	Nationality	Time	Notes
1st place, gold medalist(s)	4	Camille Lacourt	France	24.42	
2nd place, silver medalist(s)	5	Jérémy Stravius	France	24.54	
2nd place, silver medalist(s)	6	Matt Grevers	United States	24.54	
4	7	Aschwin Wildeboer	Spain	24.58	
5	8	Sun Xiaolei	China	24.76	NR
6	2	Daniel Orzechowski	Brazil	24.87	
7	3	Guy Barnea	Israel	25.14	
8	1	Jonatan Kopelev	Israel	25.19	
