= Uganda at the 2019 World Aquatics Championships =

- Flag of Uganda
- FINA code: UGA
- National federation: Uganda Swimming Federation

in Gwangju, South Korea
- Competitors: 4 in 1 sport
- Medals: Gold 0 Silver 0 Bronze 0 Total 0

World Aquatics Championships appearances
- 1973; 1975; 1978; 1982; 1986; 1991; 1994; 1998; 2001; 2003; 2005; 2007; 2009; 2011; 2013; 2015; 2017; 2019; 2022; 2023; 2024

Uganda competed at the 2019 World Aquatics Championships in Gwangju, South Korea from 12 to 28 July.

== Swimming ==
Uganda entered four swimmers.

Men

Athlete	Event	Heat		Semifinal		Final	
Athlete	Event	Time	Rank	Time	Rank	Time	Rank
Atuhaire Ambala	50 m freestyle	24.69	=86	did not advance			
Atuhaire Ambala	100 m freestyle	53.89	89	did not advance			
Tendo Mukalazi	50 m backstroke	29.70	64	did not advance			
Tendo Mukalazi	50 m breaststroke	32.64	65	did not advance			

Women

Athlete	Event	Heat		Semifinal		Final	
Athlete	Event	Time	Rank	Time	Rank	Time	Rank
Selina Katumba	100 m freestyle	1:03.88	=76	did not advance			
Selina Katumba	50 m butterfly	32.77	57	did not advance			
Avice Meya	50 m freestyle	29.49	75	did not advance			
Avice Meya	100 m butterfly	1:19.69	51	did not advance			

Mixed

Athlete	Event	Heat		Final	
Athlete	Event	Time	Rank	Time	Rank
Atuhaire Ambala; Selina Katumba; Tendo Mukalazi; Avice Meya	4 × 100 m mixed freestyle relay	4:00.09	31	did not advance	
	4 × 100 m mixed medley relay	DNS		did not advance	
