= Hadija =

Hadija is a given name and surname. Notable people with the name include:

- Hadija Haruna-Oelker, German journalist and political scientist
- Hadija Ndangiza Murangwa (born 1975), Rwandan politician
- Hadija Namanda (born 1975), Ugandan sports administrator
- Konstantin Hadija (1809–1888), Serbian politician

== See also ==
- Hadiya people
