= Swimming at the 2024 World Aquatics Championships – Women's 50 metre freestyle =

Women's 50 metre freestyle at the Swimming at the 2024 World Aquatics Championships
- Venue: Aspire Dome
- Location: Doha, Qatar
- Dates: 17 February (heats and semifinal); 18 February (final)
- Winning time: 23.69

Medalists
gold medal	Sarah Sjöström	Sweden
silver medal	Kate Douglass	United States
bronze medal	Katarzyna Wasick	Poland

The Women's 50 metre freestyle competition at the 2024 World Aquatics Championships was held on 17 and 18 February 2024.

== Qualification ==
Each National Federation was permitted to enter a maximum of two qualified athletes in each individual event, but only if both of them had attained the "A" standard qualification time at approved qualifying events. For this event, the "A" standard qualification time was 25.04 seconds. Federations could enter one athlete into the event if they met the "B" standard qualification time. For this event, the "B" standard qualification time was 25.92. Athletes could also enter the event if they had met an "A" or "B" standard in a different event and their Federation had not entered anyone else. Additional consideration was given to Federations who had few swimmers enter through the standard qualification times. Federations in this category could enter at least two men and two women into the competition, all of whom could enter into up to two events.

== Records ==
Prior to the competition, the existing world and championship records were as follows.

World record	Sarah Sjöström (SWE)	23.61	Fukuoka, Japan	29 July 2023
Competition record	Sarah Sjöström (SWE)	23.61	Fukuoka, Japan	29 July 2023

== Results ==
=== Heats ===
The heats were held on 17 February at 09:32.

Rank	Heat	Lane	Name	Nationality	Time	Notes
1	12	4	Sarah Sjöström	Sweden	23.91	Q
2	12	5	Kate Douglass	United States	24.19	Q
3	11	4	Shayna Jack	Australia	24.30	Q
4	10	4	Katarzyna Wasick	Poland	24.36	Q
5	12	3	Anna Hopkin	Great Britain	24.70	Q
6	10	5	Michelle Coleman	Sweden	24.75	Q
7	12	8	Taylor Ruck	Canada	24.84	Q
8	10	2	Kornelia Fiedkiewicz	Poland	24.85	Q
8	12	6	Melanie Henique	France	24.85	Q
10	11	5	Marrit Steenbergen	Netherlands	24.86	Q
11	10	3	Julie Kepp Jensen	Denmark	24.97	Q
12	12	2	Farida Osman	Egypt	25.01	Q
13	11	6	Neža Klančar	Slovenia	25.05	Q
14	11	3	Kim Busch	Netherlands	25.08	Q
15	11	9	Lyu Yue	China	25.10	Q
16	11	1	Kalia Antoniou	Cyprus	25.21	Q
17	11	2	Erin Gallagher	South Africa	25.37	
18	10	1	Teresa Ivan	Slovakia	25.40	
19	11	8	Jenjira Srisaard	Thailand	25.41	
20	9	5	Barbora Janíčková	Czech Republic	25.47	
20	11	7	Quah Ting Wen	Singapore	25.47	
20	12	7	Angelina Köhler	Germany	25.47	
23	9	8	Lismar Lyon	Venezuela	25.50	
23	10	6	Emma Chelius	South Africa	25.50	
25	9	7	Maria Daza Garcia	Spain	25.55	
25	10	0	Nina Stanisavljević	Serbia	25.55	
27	10	8	Hoi Lam Tam	Hong Kong	25.64	
28	12	0	Nagisa Ikemoto	Japan	25.65	
29	9	3	Andrea Berrino	Argentina	25.66	
30	11	0	Huang Mei-chien	Chinese Taipei	25.68	
31	12	9	Sofia Revilak Fonseca	Mexico	25.73	
32	9	9	Jillian Crooks	Cayman Islands	25.79	
33	9	1	Fanny Teijonsalo	Finland	25.82	
34	9	0	Amel Melih	Algeria	25.90	
35	9	4	Sirena Rowe	Colombia	25.91	
36	8	5	Emma Harvey	Bermuda	25.93	
37	8	2	Gloria Muzito	Uganda	26.01	
38	8	3	Cherelle Thompson	Trinidad and Tobago	26.03	
39	10	7	Chiara Tarantino	Italy	26.09	
40	8	0	Maria Brunlehner	Kenya	26.12	
41	9	6	Jasmine Alkhaldi	Philippines	26.14	
42	8	6	Jóhanna Elín Guðmundsdóttir	Iceland	26.20	
43	9	2	Erin Riordan	Ireland	26.26	
44	8	4	Marina Spadoni	El Salvador	26.30	
45	10	9	Smilte Plytnykaite	Lithuania	26.31	
46	8	1	Emily Macdonald	Jamaica	26.55	
47	7	3	Maxine Egner	Botswana	26.58	
48	6	0	Adriana Giles	Bolivia	26.60	
49	7	5	Mia Phiri	Zambia	26.61	
50	8	7	Gabriela Ņikitina	Latvia	26.85	
51	8	9	Paige van der Westhuizen	Zimbabwe	26.86	
52	7	4	Amani Alobaidli	Bahrain	26.87	
53	8	8	Rhanishka Gibbs	Bahamas	26.87	
54	5	5	Elizaveta Pecherskikh	Kyrgyzstan	27.00	
55	1	5	Alicia Kimberley Kok Shun	Mauritius	27.04	
56	7	6	Mikaili Charlemagne	Saint Lucia	27.05	
57	6	6	Aunjelique Liddie	Antigua and Barbuda	27.38	
58	5	8	Arla Dermishi	Albania	27.46	
59	7	1	Tilly Collymore	Grenada	27.48	
60	7	7	Varsenik Manucharyan	Armenia	27.58	
61	6	5	Alejandra Santana	Dominican Republic	27.60	
62	2	1	Zariel Nelson	Saint Vincent and the Grenadines	27.62	
63	7	2	Imane Houda El Barodi	Morocco	27.70	
64	6	8	Jovana Kuljaca	Montenegro	27.71	
65	6	7	Unilez Takyi	Ghana	27.75	
66	6	3	Christina Rach	Eritrea	28.08	
67	6	4	Sara Pastrana	Honduras	28.11	
68	7	0	Georgia-Leigh Vele	Papua New Guinea	28.15	
69	6	1	Kaiya Brown	Samoa	28.30	
70	5	4	Marina Abu Shamaleh	Palestine	28.51	
71	6	2	Aleka Kylela Persaud	Guyana	28.62	
72	2	7	Aaliyah Palestrini	Seychelles	28.69	
73	5	6	Carolann Faeamani	Tonga	28.71	
74	5	7	Kestra Kihleng	Federated States of Micronesia	28.94	
75	6	9	Anastasiya Morginshtern	Turkmenistan	28.98	
76	7	9	N'Hara Fernandes	Angola	29.13	
77	4	3	Taffi Illis	Sint Maarten	29.24	
78	5	3	Lara Dashti	Kuwait	29.27	
79	4	4	Loane Russet	Vanuatu	29.33	
80	5	2	Ekaterina Bordachyova	Tajikistan	29.35	
81	1	3	Aishath Ulya Shaig	Maldives	29.47	
82	4	2	Siwakhile Dlamini	Eswatini	29.66	
83	5	1	Arleigha Hall	Turks and Caicos Islands	29.70	
84	5	0	Makelyta Singsombath	Laos	29.77	
85	1	4	Alicia Mateus	Mozambique	30.02	
86	3	4	Jasmine Schofield	Dominica	30.60	
87	4	6	La Troya Lesa Pina	Cape Verde	30.61	
88	4	7	Iman Kouraogo	Burkina Faso	30.89	
89	2	8	Lois Eliora Irishura	Burundi	30.92	
90	4	5	Mst Sonia Khatun	Bangladesh	30.95	
91	5	9	Jessica Makwenda	Malawi	31.07	
92	4	1	Kayla Hepler	Marshall Islands	31.13	
93	4	8	Natalia Ladha	Tanzania	31.37	
94	4	0	Aya Mpali	Gabon	31.40	
95	3	5	Yuri Hosei	Palau	31.41	
96	4	9	Nada Arkaji	Qatar	31.78	
97	3	6	Leena Mohamedahmed	Sudan	31.83	
98	2	4	Djenabou Jolie Bah	Guinea	31.93	
99	2	2	Grace Manuela Nguelo'o	Cameroon	32.20	
100	3	7	Lina Alemayehu Selo	Ethiopia	32.62	
101	2	0	Kamila Ibrahim	Comoros	33.36	
102	2	5	Nina Amison	Djibouti	33.99	
103	2	9	Nyirabyenda	Rwanda	34.22	
104	3	1	Salima Ahmadou Youssoufou	Niger	34.88	
105	2	6	Tracy Marine Andet	Central African Republic	41.14	
106	3	9	Assita Diarra	Ivory Coast	41.35	
107	3	0	Olamide Sam	Sierra Leone	45.51	
	2	3	Rita Acaba Ocomo	Equatorial Guinea		DNS
	3	3	Imelda Ximenes Belo	Timor-Leste		DNS
	3	8	Vanessa Bobimbo	Congo		DNS
	12	1	Theodora Drakou	Greece		DNS
	3	2	Adele Sodalo Agnes Gaitou	Togo		DSQ
	7	8	Ionnah Eliane Douillet	Benin		DSQ

=== Semifinals ===
The semifinals were held on 17 February at 19:50.

Rank	Heat	Lane	Name	Nationality	Time	Notes
1	2	4	Sarah Sjöström	Sweden	23.90	Q
2	1	5	Katarzyna Wasick	Poland	24.01	Q, NR
3	1	4	Kate Douglass	United States	24.24	Q
4	2	5	Shayna Jack	Australia	24.44	Q
5	2	3	Anna Hopkin	Great Britain	24.51	Q
6	1	3	Michelle Coleman	Sweden	24.65	Q
7	1	6	Kornelia Fiedkiewicz	Poland	24.71	Q
8	2	6	Taylor Ruck	Canada	24.72	Q
9	1	2	Marrit Steenbergen	Netherlands	24.74	
9	2	2	Melanie Henique	France	24.74	
11	2	7	Julie Kepp Jensen	Denmark	24.80	
12	1	1	Kim Busch	Netherlands	24.86	
13	2	1	Neža Klančar	Slovenia	24.87	
14	1	8	Kalia Antoniou	Cyprus	24.96	
15	2	8	Lyu Yue	China	25.04	
16	1	7	Farida Osman	Egypt	25.07	

=== Final ===
The final was held on 18 February at 19:46.

Rank	Lane	Name	Nationality	Time	Notes
1st place, gold medalist(s)	4	Sarah Sjöström	Sweden	23.69	
2nd place, silver medalist(s)	3	Kate Douglass	United States	23.91	AM
3rd place, bronze medalist(s)	5	Katarzyna Wasick	Poland	23.95	NR
4	6	Shayna Jack	Australia	24.27	
5	8	Taylor Ruck	Canada	24.50	
6	2	Anna Hopkin	Great Britain	24.51	
7	1	Kornelia Fiedkiewicz	Poland	24.69	
8	7	Michelle Coleman	Sweden	24.79	

== Sources ==
- "Competition Regulations" (PDF). World Aquatics. Archived (PDF) from the original on 15 February 2026.
