= Uganda at the 2011 World Aquatics Championships =

- Flag of Uganda
- FINA code: UGA
- National federation: Uganda Swimming Federation
- Website: www.ugandaswimming.org

in Shanghai, China
- Competitors: 3 in 1 sport
- Medals: Gold 0 Silver 0 Bronze 0 Total 0

World Aquatics Championships appearances
- 1973; 1975; 1978; 1982; 1986; 1991; 1994; 1998; 2001; 2003; 2005; 2007; 2009; 2011; 2013; 2015; 2017; 2019; 2022; 2023; 2024

Uganda competed at the 2011 World Aquatics Championships in Shanghai, China between 16 and 31 July.

== Swimming ==
Uganda qualified 3 swimmers.

Men

Athlete	Event	Heats		Semifinals		Final	
Athlete	Event	Time	Rank	Time	Rank	Time	Rank
Conrad Gaira	Men's 50 m freestyle	28.65	98	did not advance			
Conrad Gaira	Men's 50 m butterfly	29.36	46	did not advance			
Ganzi Semu Mugula	Men's 50 m freestyle	27.58	84	did not advance			
Ganzi Semu Mugula	Men's 50 m breaststroke	34.38	44	did not advance			

Women

Athlete	Event	Heats		Semifinals		Final	
Athlete	Event	Time	Rank	Time	Rank	Time	Rank
Jamila Lunkuse	Women's 50 m freestyle	28.34	51	did not advance			
Jamila Lunkuse	Women's 50 m breaststroke	36.65	26	did not advance			
