= Uganda at the 2017 World Aquatics Championships =

- Flag of Uganda
- FINA code: UGA
- National federation: Uganda Swimming Federation
- Website: www.ugandaswimming.org

in Budapest, Hungary
- Competitors: 3 in 1 sport
- Medals: Gold 0 Silver 0 Bronze 0 Total 0

World Aquatics Championships appearances
- 1973; 1975; 1978; 1982; 1986; 1991; 1994; 1998; 2001; 2003; 2005; 2007; 2009; 2011; 2013; 2015; 2017; 2019; 2022; 2023; 2024

Uganda competed at the 2017 World Aquatics Championships in Budapest, Hungary from 14 to 30 July.

== Swimming ==
Uganda has received a Universality invitation from FINA to send three swimmers (two men and one woman) to the World Championships.

Athlete	Event	Heat		Semifinal		Final	
Athlete	Event	Time	Rank	Time	Rank	Time	Rank
Ismah Serunjoji	Men's 50 m freestyle	27.37	112	did not advance			
Ismah Serunjoji	Men's 50 m butterfly	28.57	75	did not advance			
Joshua Tibatemwa	Men's 100 m freestyle	58.79	104	did not advance			
Joshua Tibatemwa	Men's 50 m breaststroke	32.77	71	did not advance			
Avice Meya	Women's 50 m freestyle	29.88	70	did not advance			
Avice Meya	Women's 50 m butterfly	33.05	53	did not advance			
