= Sudan at the 2013 World Aquatics Championships =

- Flag of Sudan
- FINA code: SUD
- National federation: Sudan Swimming Federation

in Barcelona, Spain
- Competitors: 5 in 2 sports
- Medals: Gold 0 Silver 0 Bronze 0 Total 0

World Aquatics Championships appearances
- 1973; 1975; 1978; 1982; 1986; 1991; 1994; 1998; 2001; 2003; 2005; 2007; 2009; 2011; 2013; 2015; 2017; 2019; 2022; 2023; 2024

Sudan competed at the 2013 World Aquatics Championships in Barcelona, Spain, between 19 July and 4 August 2013.

== Open water swimming ==
Sudan qualified two quota places for the following events in open water swimming.

Athlete	Event	Time	Rank
Ahmed Abdelrahman Adam	Men's 5 km	OTL	
Amgad Mesad Elsaroor	Men's 5 km	1:23:17.5	52

== Swimming ==
Sudanese swimmers achieved qualifying standards in the following events (up to a maximum of 2 swimmers in each event at the A-standard entry time, and 1 at the B-standard):

Men

Athlete	Event	Heat		Semifinal		Final	
Athlete	Event	Time	Rank	Time	Rank	Time	Rank
Abdelrahim Mohamed Abdelrahim	50 m freestyle	28.78	97	did not advance			
Abdelrahim Mohamed Abdelrahim	50 m backstroke	DNS		did not advance			
Ayoub Kalfo	50 m freestyle	DNS		did not advance			

Women

Athlete	Event	Heat		Semifinal		Final	
Athlete	Event	Time	Rank	Time	Rank	Time	Rank
Mhasin El Nour Fadlalla	50 m freestyle	36.20	81	did not advance			
