= Swimming at the 2019 World Aquatics Championships – Men's 50 metre freestyle =

Men's 50 metre freestyle at the 2019 World Aquatics Championships
- Venue: Nambu University Municipal Aquatics Center
- Location: Gwangju, South Korea
- Dates: 26 July (heats and semifinals); 27 July (final)
- Competitors: 131 from 125 nations
- Winning time: 21.04

Medalists
| gold medal | Caeleb Dressel | United States |
| silver medal | Bruno Fratus | Brazil |
| silver medal | Kristian Golomeev | Greece |

The Men's 50 metre freestyle competition at the 2019 World Championships was held on 26 and 27 July 2019. Caeleb Dressel finished first in the final, retaining the title he won in the previous Championships.

== Records ==
Prior to the competition, the existing world and championship records were as follows.

| World record | César Cielo (BRA) | 20.91 | São Paulo, Brazil | 18 December 2009 |
| Competition record | César Cielo (BRA) | 21.08 | Rome, Italy | 1 August 2009 |

The following new records were set during this competition.

| Date | Event | Name | Nationality | Time | Record |
|---|---|---|---|---|---|
| 27 July | Final | Caeleb Dressel | United States | 21.04 | CR |

== Results ==
=== Heats ===
The heats were held on 26 July at 10:43.

| Rank | Heat | Lane | Name | Nationality | Time | Notes |
|---|---|---|---|---|---|---|
| 1 | 13 | 3 | Caeleb Dressel | United States | 21.49 | Q |
| 2 | 14 | 4 | Benjamin Proud | Great Britain | 21.69 | Q |
| 3 | 13 | 5 | Vladimir Morozov | Russia | 21.70 | Q |
| 4 | 13 | 4 | Bruno Fratus | Brazil | 21.71 | Q |
| 5 | 12 | 3 | Shinri Shioura | Japan | 21.78 | Q |
| 6 | 14 | 5 | Kristian Golomeev | Greece | 21.80 | Q |
| 7 | 14 | 3 | Michael Andrew | United States | 21.82 | Q |
| 8 | 13 | 7 | Cameron McEvoy | Australia | 21.93 | Q |
| 9 | 12 | 5 | Paweł Juraszek | Poland | 21.97 | Q |
| 10 | 12 | 1 | Marcelo Chierighini | Brazil | 22.03 | Q |
| 11 | 14 | 8 | Ali Khalafalla | Egypt | 22.04 | Q |
| 12 | 11 | 3 | Meiron Cheruti | Israel | 22.06 | Q, NR |
| 13 | 14 | 2 | Maxim Lobanovskij | Hungary | 22.11 | Q |
| 14 | 13 | 0 | Maxime Grousset | France | 22.12 | Q |
| 15 | 12 | 2 | Jesse Puts | Netherlands | 22.16 | Q |
| 16 | 11 | 5 | Wu Chun-feng | Chinese Taipei | 22.21 | QSO, =NR |
| 16 | 14 | 9 | Yu Hexin | China | 22.21 | QSO |
| 18 | 12 | 6 | Brad Tandy | South Africa | 22.24 | |
| 19 | 10 | 3 | Yang Jae-hoon | South Korea | 22.26 | NR |
| 20 | 11 | 4 | Pieter Timmers | Belgium | 22.32 | |
| 21 | 13 | 9 | Renzo Tjon A Joe | Suriname | 22.33 | |
| 21 | 14 | 6 | Simonas Bilis | Lithuania | 22.33 | |
| 21 | 14 | 7 | Ari-Pekka Liukkonen | Finland | 22.33 | |
| 24 | 13 | 2 | Oussama Sahnoune | Algeria | 22.37 | |
| 25 | 13 | 1 | Yuri Kisil | Canada | 22.38 | |
| 26 | 10 | 4 | Artsiom Machekin | Belarus | 22.41 | |
| 26 | 12 | 8 | Katsumi Nakamura | Japan | 22.41 | |
| 28 | 10 | 9 | Daniel Zaitsev | Estonia | 22.46 | |
| 29 | 14 | 1 | Luca Dotto | Italy | 22.48 | |
| 30 | 12 | 9 | Nándor Németh | Hungary | 22.51 | |
| 31 | 14 | 0 | Vladislav Grinev | Russia | 22.52 | |
| 32 | 10 | 7 | Hüseyin Emre Sakçı | Turkey | 22.54 | |
| 33 | 13 | 8 | Bruno Blašković | Croatia | 22.55 | |
| 34 | 10 | 2 | Jonathan Tan | Singapore | 22.56 | |
| 34 | 10 | 8 | Emir Muratović | Bosnia and Herzegovina | 22.56 | NR |
| 34 | 12 | 4 | Andrea Vergani | Italy | 22.56 | |
| 37 | 13 | 6 | Andriy Hovorov | Ukraine | 22.57 | |
| 38 | 11 | 6 | Ian Ho Yentou | Hong Kong | 22.59 | |
| 38 | 11 | 8 | Michael Pickett | New Zealand | 22.59 | |
| 40 | 10 | 5 | Juan Francisco Segura | Spain | 22.64 | |
| 41 | 11 | 0 | Dylan Carter | Trinidad and Tobago | 22.65 | |
| 42 | 9 | 6 | Julien Henx | Luxembourg | 22.71 | NR |
| 43 | 11 | 1 | Alexandr Varakin | Kazakhstan | 22.72 | |
| 44 | 9 | 5 | Peter Wetzlar | Zimbabwe | 22.77 | NR |
| 44 | 11 | 2 | Andrej Barna | Serbia | 22.77 | |
| 46 | 11 | 7 | Niksa Stojkovski | Norway | 22.79 | |
| 47 | 10 | 1 | Enzo Martínez | Uruguay | 22.87 | |
| 48 | 10 | 0 | George-Adrian Ratiu | Romania | 22.88 | |
| 49 | 9 | 4 | Bernhard Reitshammer | Austria | 22.91 | |
| 50 | 11 | 9 | Virdhawal Khade | India | 22.95 | |
| 51 | 8 | 3 | Xander Skinner | Namibia | 23.04 | NR |
| 52 | 9 | 2 | Vladimír Štefánik | Slovakia | 23.06 | |
| 52 | 9 | 3 | Tobias Bjerg | Denmark | 23.06 | |
| 54 | 3 | 9 | Constantin Malachi | Moldova | 23.11 | |
| 55 | 9 | 9 | Brett Fraser | Cayman Islands | 23.12 | |
| 56 | 8 | 5 | Andrew Chetcuti | Malta | 23.17 | |
| 57 | 10 | 6 | Bradley Vincent | Mauritius | 23.23 | |
| 58 | 9 | 1 | Luke Gebbie | Philippines | 23.26 | |
| 59 | 9 | 7 | Triady Fauzi Sidiq | Indonesia | 23.36 | |
| 60 | 8 | 4 | Omiros Zagkas | Cyprus | 23.37 | |
| 61 | 9 | 0 | Benyamin Gharehassanloo | Iran | 23.39 | |
| 62 | 7 | 5 | Stefano Mitchell | Antigua and Barbuda | 23.44 | NR |
| 63 | 8 | 7 | Isaac Beitia | Panama | 23.45 | |
| 64 | 8 | 2 | Jean-Luc Zephir | Saint Lucia | 23.51 | |
| 65 | 8 | 1 | Vahan Mkhitaryan | Armenia | 23.62 | |
| 66 | 7 | 3 | Waleed Abdulrazzak | Kuwait | 23.64 | |
| 67 | 8 | 8 | Horus Briseño | Mexico | 23.65 | |
| 68 | 8 | 6 | Marco Flores | Honduras | 23.71 | |
| 69 | 7 | 6 | Danilo Rosafio | Kenya | 23.86 | |
| 70 | 7 | 4 | Abdoul Niane | Senegal | 23.88 | |
| 71 | 3 | 2 | Ghirmai Efrem | Eritrea | 23.92 | |
| 72 | 3 | 5 | Myagmaryn Delgerkhüü | Mongolia | 23.93 | NR |
| 73 | 7 | 0 | Micah Masei | American Samoa | 24.05 | |
| 74 | 3 | 1 | Nixon Hernández | El Salvador | 24.12 | |
| 75 | 7 | 8 | Jared Fitzgerald | Bahamas | 24.15 | |
| 76 | 7 | 2 | Sam Seghers | Papua New Guinea | 24.16 | |
| 76 | 7 | 9 | Filipe Gomes | Malawi | 24.16 | |
| 78 | 8 | 0 | Miguel Mena | Nicaragua | 24.19 | |
| 79 | 6 | 3 | Daniel Francisco | Angola | 24.21 | |
| 79 | 6 | 5 | Boško Radulović | Montenegro | 24.21 | |
| 81 | 6 | 4 | Kerry Ollivierre | Grenada | 24.23 | |
| 82 | 8 | 9 | Jorge Depassier | Chile | 24.29 | |
| 83 | 7 | 1 | Jagger Stephens | Guam | 24.45 | |
| 84 | 5 | 9 | Erico Cuna | Mozambique | 24.60 | |
| 85 | 6 | 2 | Issa Al-Adawi | Oman | 24.65 | |
| 86 | 6 | 8 | Christian Nikles | Brunei | 24.69 | |
| 86 | 6 | 9 | Atuhaire Ambala | Uganda | 24.69 | NR |
| 88 | 3 | 8 | Musa Zhalayev | Turkmenistan | 24.71 | |
| 89 | 6 | 1 | Shane Cadogan | Saint Vincent and the Grenadines | 24.80 | |
| 90 | 1 | 6 | Yellow Yeiyah | Nigeria | 24.81 | |
| 91 | 1 | 2 | Samuele Rossi | Seychelles | 24.90 | |
| 92 | 2 | 3 | Mohd Ariful Islam | Bangladesh | 24.92 | |
| 93 | 6 | 0 | Theo Chiabaut | Monaco | 24.96 | |
| 94 | 7 | 7 | Hilal Hemed Hilal | Tanzania | 25.01 | |
| 95 | 2 | 8 | Hem Puch | Cambodia | 25.13 | |
| 96 | 6 | 6 | Firass Saidi | Qatar | 25.20 | |
| 97 | 6 | 7 | Andrew Fowler | Guyana | 25.26 | |
| 98 | 5 | 3 | Finau Ohuafi | Tonga | 25.32 | |
| 99 | 1 | 5 | Alassane Lancina | Niger | 25.33 | |
| 99 | 5 | 7 | Belly-Cresus Ganira | Burundi | 25.33 | |
| 101 | 2 | 1 | Adama Ouedraogo | Burkina Faso | 25.38 | NR |
| 101 | 2 | 5 | Alexander Shah | Nepal | 25.38 | |
| 103 | 1 | 3 | Nabeel Hatoum | Palestine | 25.42 | NR |
| 104 | 5 | 4 | Mohammed Jibali | Libya | 25.44 | |
| 105 | 3 | 3 | Troy Pina | Cape Verde | 25.64 | |
| 106 | 5 | 6 | Kaleo Kihleng | Federated States of Micronesia | 25.71 | |
| 107 | 5 | 5 | Olimjon Ishanov | Tajikistan | 25.73 | |
| 108 | 3 | 6 | Mark Hoare | Eswatini | 25.76 | |
| 109 | 5 | 1 | Santisouk Inthavong | Laos | 25.79 | |
| 110 | 1 | 4 | Mawupemon Otogbe | Togo | 25.84 | |
| 111 | 5 | 0 | Jefferson Kpanou | Benin | 26.18 | |
| 112 | 5 | 2 | Abobakr Abass | Sudan | 26.21 | NR |
| 113 | 2 | 4 | Guerby Ruuska | Haiti | 27.11 | |
| 114 | 2 | 7 | Joshua Wyse | Sierra Leone | 27.17 | |
| 115 | 4 | 4 | Ali Imaan | Maldives | 27.21 | |
| 116 | 4 | 8 | Abdelmalik Muktar | Ethiopia | 27.39 | |
| 116 | 5 | 8 | Clayment Lafiara | Solomon Islands | 27.39 | |
| 118 | 2 | 6 | Shawn Dingilius-Wallace | Palau | 27.45 | |
| 119 | 4 | 9 | Ebrima Buaro | Gambia | 27.83 | |
| 120 | 4 | 1 | Mamadou Bah | Guinea | 27.91 | |
| 121 | 4 | 0 | Cedrick Niyibizi | Rwanda | 28.27 | |
| 122 | 3 | 0 | Charly Ndjoume | Cameroon | 28.45 | |
| 123 | 4 | 3 | Mohamed Ibrahim | Comoros | 29.17 | |
| 124 | 4 | 6 | Phillip Kinono | Marshall Islands | 29.25 | |
| 125 | 4 | 5 | Tenzin Sangay | Bhutan | 29.49 | |
| 126 | 4 | 2 | José da Silva Viegas | Timor-Leste | 29.51 | |
| 127 | 4 | 7 | Hassan Baidar | Yemen | 29.98 | |
| 128 | 3 | 7 | Adam Mpali | Gabon | 30.26 | |
| 129 | 2 | 9 | Hamid Rahimi | Afghanistan | 30.79 | |
| 130 | 2 | 0 | Diosdado Miko | Equatorial Guinea | 31.78 | |
| | 2 | 2 | Houmed Hussein | Djibouti | DSQ | |
| | 3 | 4 | Thibaut Danho | Ivory Coast | DNS | |
| | 9 | 8 | Khurshidjon Tursunov | Uzbekistan | DNS | |
| | 12 | 0 | Miguel Nascimento | Portugal | DNS | |
| | 12 | 7 | Clément Mignon | France | DNS | |

=== Swim-off ===
The swim-off was held on 26 July at 12:00.

| Rank | Lane | Name | Nationality | Time | Notes |
|---|---|---|---|---|---|
| 1 | 5 | Yu Hexin | China | 22.08 | Q |
| 2 | 4 | Wu Chun-feng | Chinese Taipei | 22.24 | |

=== Semifinals ===
The semifinals were held on 26 July at 20:41.

==== Semifinal 1 ====
| Rank | Lane | Name | Nationality | Time | Notes |
|---|---|---|---|---|---|
| 1 | 5 | Bruno Fratus | Brazil | 21.53 | Q |
| 2 | 4 | Benjamin Proud | Great Britain | 21.56 | Q |
| 3 | 3 | Kristian Golomeev | Greece | 21.60 | Q |
| 4 | 1 | Maxime Grousset | France | 21.86 | |
| 5 | 6 | Cameron McEvoy | Australia | 21.88 | |
| 6 | 7 | Meiron Cheruti | Israel | 22.01 | NR |
| 7 | 8 | Yu Hexin | China | 22.11 | |
| 8 | 2 | Marcelo Chierighini | Brazil | 22.19 | |

==== Semifinal 2 ====
| Rank | Lane | Name | Nationality | Time | Notes |
|---|---|---|---|---|---|
| 1 | 4 | Caeleb Dressel | United States | 21.18 | Q |
| 2 | 5 | Vladimir Morozov | Russia | 21.65 | Q |
| 3 | 2 | Paweł Juraszek | Poland | 21.69 | Q |
| 4 | 3 | Shinri Shioura | Japan | 21.74 | Q |
| 5 | 6 | Michael Andrew | United States | 21.77 | Q |
| 6 | 1 | Maxim Lobanovskij | Hungary | 21.89 | |
| 7 | 8 | Jesse Puts | Netherlands | 21.91 | |
| 8 | 7 | Ali Khalafalla | Egypt | 21.98 | |

==== Final ====
The final was started on 27 July at 20:09.

| Rank | Lane | Name | Nationality | Time | Notes |
|---|---|---|---|---|---|
| 1st place, gold medalist(s) | 4 | Caeleb Dressel | United States | 21.04 | CR, NR |
| 2nd place, silver medalist(s) | 5 | Bruno Fratus | Brazil | 21.45 | |
| 2nd place, silver medalist(s) | 6 | Kristian Gkolomeev | Greece | 21.45 | |
| 4 | 2 | Vladimir Morozov | Russia | 21.53 | |
| 5 | 3 | Benjamin Proud | Great Britain | 21.55 | |
| 6 | 8 | Michael Andrew | United States | 21.62 | |
| 7 | 7 | Paweł Juraszek | Poland | 21.67 | |
| 8 | 1 | Shinri Shioura | Japan | 21.81 | |
