= Ogunsola =

- Gender: Unisex (primarily masculine)
- Language: Yoruba

Origin
- Origin: Nigerian
- Meaning: Ogun makes wealth
- Region of origin: Southwest Nigeria

Ogunsola (audio) is a Nigerian surname and unisex (though primarily masculine) given name. It is of Yoruban origin and means "Ogun makes wealth", Ogun being the Yoruban god of iron. The name also has a diminutive form, Ogunshola.

Notable people with the name include:

- Folarin Ogunsola (born 1997), Gambian swimmer
- Folasade Ogunsola (born 1958), Nigerian professor and microbiologist
