= Piotr Ludwiczak =

Polish swimmer (born 1996)

Piotr Mateusz Ludwiczak
Personal information
- Born: May 1, 1996 (age 30)
- Height: 1.90 m (6 ft 3 in)

Sport
- Country: Poland
- Sport: Swimming
Medal record
Men's swimming
Representing Poland
World Championships (SC)
Bronze medal – third place	2024 Budapest	4×100 m freestyle
Bronze medal – third place	2024 Budapest	4×50 m mixed freestyle
European Championships (SC)
Silver medal – second place	2025 Lublin	4×50 m freestyle
World University Games
Gold medal – first place	2021 Chengdu	4×100 m freestyle

Piotr Mateusz Ludwiczak (born 1 May 1996) is a Polish swimmer specializing in freestyle.

At the 2021 Summer Universiade in Chengdu, held in 2023 due to the COVID-19 pandemic, Ludwiczak won a gold medal in the 4 × 100 m freestyle relay.

At the 2024 European Aquatics Championships in Belgrade in June 2024, he finished fourth in the 50 m freestyle event with a time of 21.90.
