= Swimming at the 2013 World Aquatics Championships – Men's 50 metre freestyle =

Men's 50 metre freestyle at the 2013 World Aquatics Championships
- Venue: Palau Sant Jordi
- Dates: August 2, 2013 (heats & semifinals); August 3, 2013 (final)
- Competitors: 106 from 98 nations
- Winning time: 21.32

Medalists
gold medal	César Cielo	Brazil
silver medal	Vladimir Morozov	Russia
bronze medal	George Bovell	Trinidad and Tobago

Barcelona Palau San Jordi

The men's 50 metre freestyle event in swimming at the 2013 World Aquatics Championships took place on 2–3 August at the Palau Sant Jordi in Barcelona, Spain.

== Records ==
Prior to this competition, the existing world and championship records were:

World record	César Cielo (BRA)	20.91	São Paulo, Brazil	18 December 2009
Competition record	César Cielo (BRA)	21.08	Rome, Italy	1 August 2009

== Results ==
=== Heats ===
The heats were held at 10:00.

Rank	Heat	Lane	Name	Nationality	Time	Notes
1	11	4	Florent Manaudou	France	21.72	Q
2	11	5	César Cielo	Brazil	21.76	Q
3	9	7	Andriy Govorov	Ukraine	21.80	Q, NR
4	9	6	Matthew Abood	Australia	21.84	Q
5	10	5	Anthony Ervin	United States	21.87	Q
6	10	4	Nathan Adrian	United States	21.88	Q
7	9	5	Vladimir Morozov	Russia	21.95	Q
8	11	6	Marcelo Chierighini	Brazil	22.01	Q
8	11	7	Krisztián Takács	Hungary	22.01	Q
10	10	7	Shinri Shioura	Japan	22.02	Q, NR
11	9	4	James Magnussen	Australia	22.04	Q
11	9	3	Roland Schoeman	South Africa	22.04	Q
13	1	1	Andrey Grechin	Russia	22.08	Q
14	10	3	George Bovell	Trinidad and Tobago	22.09	Q
15	11	3	Frédérick Bousquet	France	22.11	Q
16	10	8	Norbert Trandafir	Romania	22.25	Q
17	10	6	Adam Brown	Great Britain	22.30	
18	9	2	Benjamin Proud	Great Britain	22.31	
19	9	8	Ari-Pekka Liukkonen	Finland	22.38	
20	10	9	Oussama Sahnoune	Algeria	22.41	
21	11	2	Luca Dotto	Italy	22.45	
22	8	7	Yang Jung-Doo	South Korea	22.48	NR
23	10	2	Marco Orsi	Italy	22.61	
24	11	1	Kristian Golomeev	Greece	22.62	
25	9	9	Christoph Fildebrandt	Germany	22.64	
26	7	5	Mindaugas Sadauskas	Lithuania	22.69	
27	7	6	Tomáš Plevko	Czech Republic	22.71	NR
28	10	1	Kenta Ito	Japan	22.77	
29	11	0	Hanser García	Cuba	22.78	
29	8	4	Sebastiaan Verschuren	Netherlands	22.78	
31	8	9	Boris Stojanović	Serbia	22.81	
32	7	3	Pjotr Degtjarjov	Estonia	22.84	
33	10	0	Yoris Grandjean	Belgium	22.85	
34	8	5	Doğa Çelik	Turkey	22.89	
35	7	7	Oliver Elliot	Chile	22.90	
35	7	0	Geoffrey Cheah	Hong Kong	22.90	
37	9	0	Roy-Allan Burch	Bermuda	22.93	
38	7	2	Elvis Burrows	Bahamas	22.98	
39	8	3	Christopher Manning	Canada	22.99	
40	8	1	Federico Grabich	Argentina	23.00	
41	7	4	Alejandro Escudero	Mexico	23.07	
42	8	6	Gabriel Melconian Alvez	Uruguay	23.11	
43	8	2	Barry Murphy	Ireland	23.13	
44	7	8	Triady Fauzi Sidiq	Indonesia	23.14	
45	6	6	Sean Gunn	Zimbabwe	23.25	NR
46	8	8	Mohammad Madwa	Kuwait	23.34	NR
47	6	7	Anthony Clark	French Polynesia	23.47	NR
47	6	8	Allan Gutiérrez Castro	Honduras	23.47	
49	7	1	Shehab Younis	Egypt	23.49	
50	6	9	Vahan Mkhitaryan	Armenia	23.58	
51	11	9	Lü Zhiwu	China	23.64	
52	1	4	Bradley Vincent	Mauritius	23.82	
53	6	5	Arsham Mirzaei	Iran	24.00	
54	8	0	Virdhawal Khade	India	24.07	
55	5	5	Mehdi El Hazzaz	Morocco	24.10	
56	6	2	Matthew Zammit	Malta	24.11	
57	5	3	Joshua Daniel	Saint Lucia	24.16	
58	5	6	Rodrigo Suriano	El Salvador	24.32	
59	2	1	Mahfizur Rahman Sagor	Bangladesh	24.39	
60	5	8	Ahmad Attellesey	Libya	24.45	
61	6	1	Davit Sikharulidze	Georgia	24.49	
62	6	0	Sebastián Jahnsen Madico	Peru	24.54	
63	6	4	Lei Cheok Fong	Macau	24.55	
64	5	2	Adrian Todd	Botswana	24.65	
65	7	9	Kirill Vais	Kyrgyzstan	24.69	
66	4	4	Christopher Duenas	Guam	25.00	
67	5	7	Ahmed Al-Dulaimi	Iraq	25.32	
68	5	0	Niall Roberts	Guyana	25.33	
69	4	3	Farhan Sultan	Bahrain	25.39	
70	4	9	Kwaku Addo	Ghana	25.47	
71	4	5	Christian Nikles	Brunei	25.52	
72	5	9	Valdo Lourenco	Mozambique	25.58	
73	4	1	Chris Regis	Grenada	25.61	
74	4	2	Hilal Hemed Hilal	Tanzania	25.64	
75	4	6	Suleyman Atayev	Turkmenistan	25.81	
76	5	4	Mohammad Abdo	Palestine	25.85	
77	1	7	Derek Dainard	Micronesia	25.99	
78	3	5	J'Air Smith	Antigua and Barbuda	26.04	
79	3	5	Giordan Harris	Marshall Islands	26.41	
79	4	8	Pierre Tano	Ivory Coast	26.41	
81	2	0	Ahmed Borhane	Djibouti	26.92	
82	3	4	Folarin Ogunsola	Gambia	26.93	
83	3	3	Umarkhon Alizoda	Tajikistan	27.14	
84	3	1	Patrick Rukundo	Rwanda	27.27	
85	9	1	Hem Thon Ponleu	Cambodia	27.34	
86	2	3	Ibrahima Ela Camara	Guinea	27.46	
86	3	7	Soulasen Phommasen	Laos	27.46	
88	3	8	Robel Kiros Habte	Ethiopia	27.48	
89	2	9	Adnan Mohamed Muthasim	Maldives	27.53	
90	2	5	Nikolas Sylvester	Saint Vincent and the Grenadines	28.25	
91	4	7	Osman Kamara	Sierra Leone	28.30	
92	3	0	Shawn Dingilius	Palau	28.38	
93	4	0	Arnold Kisulo	Uganda	28.41	
94	2	2	Carmel Bavuna	Burundi	28.42	
95	3	2	Miraj Prajapati	Nepal	28.74	
96	3	9	Yousef Al-Nehmi	Yemen	28.75	
97	2	4	Abdelrahim Mohamed Abdelrahim	Sudan	28.78	
98	2	6	Wilfried Tevoedjre	Benin	29.00	
99	2	7	Moctar Albachir	Niger	29.05	
100	11	8	Moise Ngondo	DR Congo	29.08	
101	1	2	Christian Nassif	Central African Republic	29.79	
102	1	6	Emeric Kpegba	Togo	30.54	
103	1	5	Tarnagda Hamadou	Burkina Faso	31.10	
104	1	3	Boubou Togo	Mali	31.78	
105	2	8	Kurt Oniange	Congo	33.15	
	5	1	Yellow Yeiyah	Nigeria		DSQ
	6	3	Omiros Zagkas	Cyprus		DNS

=== Semifinals ===
The semifinals were held at 18:38.

==== Semifinal 1 ====
Rank	Lane	Name	Nationality	Time	Notes
1	3	Nathan Adrian	United States	21.60	Q
1	4	César Cielo	Brazil	21.60	Q
3	7	Roland Schoeman	South Africa	21.67	Q, =AF
4	1	George Bovell	Trinidad and Tobago	21.74	Q
5	6	Marcelo Chierighini	Brazil	21.84	
6	5	Matthew Abood	Australia	21.91	
7	8	Norbert Trandafir	Romania	21.98	NR
8	2	Shinri Shioura	Japan	22.04	

==== Semifinal 2 ====
Rank	Lane	Name	Nationality	Time	Notes
1	4	Florent Manaudou	France	21.37	Q
2	3	Anthony Ervin	United States	21.42	Q
3	8	Frédérick Bousquet	France	21.62	Q
4	6	Vladimir Morozov	Russia	21.63	Q, NR
5	7	James Magnussen	Australia	21.79	
6	5	Andriy Govorov	Ukraine	21.96	
7	1	Andrey Grechin	Russia	22.00	
8	2	Krisztián Takács	Hungary	22.28	

=== Final ===
The final was held at 18:09.

Rank	Lane	Name	Nationality	Time	Notes
1st place, gold medalist(s)	6	César Cielo	Brazil	21.32	
2nd place, silver medalist(s)	7	Vladimir Morozov	Russia	21.47	NR
3rd place, bronze medalist(s)	8	George Bovell	Trinidad and Tobago	21.51	
4	3	Nathan Adrian	United States	21.60	
5	4	Florent Manaudou	France	21.64	
6	5	Anthony Ervin	United States	21.65	
7	1	Roland Schoeman	South Africa	21.85	
8	2	Frédérick Bousquet	France	21.93	
