= Dominica at the 2024 World Aquatics Championships =

- Flag of Dominica
- FINA code: DMA
- National federation: Dominica Amateur Swimming Association

in Doha, Qatar
- Competitors: 1 in 1 sport
- Medals: Gold 0 Silver 0 Bronze 0 Total 0

World Aquatics Championships appearances
- 2023; 2024

Dominica competed at the 2024 World Aquatics Championships in Doha, Qatar from 2 to 18 February.

== Competitors ==
The following is the list of competitors in the Championships.

Sport	Men	Women	Total
Swimming	0	1	1
Total	0	1	1

== Swimming ==
Dominica entered 1 swimmers.

Women

Athlete	Event	Heat		Semifinal		Final	
Athlete	Event	Time	Rank	Time	Rank	Time	Rank
Jasmine Schofield	50 metre freestyle	30.60	86	Did not advance			
Jasmine Schofield	100 metre freestyle	1:07.66	77	Did not advance			
