= Dominica at the 2023 World Aquatics Championships =

- Flag of Dominica
- FINA code: DMA
- National federation: Dominica Amateur Swimming Association

in Fukuoka, Japan
- Competitors: 1 in 1 sport
- Medals: Gold 0 Silver 0 Bronze 0 Total 0

World Aquatics Championships appearances
- 2023; 2024

Dominica competed at the 2023 World Aquatics Championships in Fukuoka, Japan from 14 to 30 July.

== Swimming ==
Dominica entered 1 swimmer.

Men

Athlete	Event	Heat		Semifinal		Final	
Athlete	Event	Time	Rank	Time	Rank	Time	Rank
Warren Lawrence	50 metre freestyle	24.51	79	Did not advance			
Warren Lawrence	50 metre backstroke	27.45	52	Did not advance			
