= Swimming at the 2024 World Aquatics Championships – Women's 100 metre freestyle =

Women's 100 metre freestyle at the 2024 World Aquatics Championships
- Venue: Aspire Dome
- Location: Doha, Qatar
- Dates: 15 February (heats and semifinals); 16 February (final)
- Competitors: 85 from 85 nations
- Winning time: 52.26

Medalists
gold medal	Marrit Steenbergen	Netherlands
silver medal	Siobhán Haughey	Hong Kong
bronze medal	Shayna Jack	Australia

The women's 100 metre freestyle competition at the 2024 World Aquatics Championships was held on 15 and 16 February 2024.

== Qualification ==
Each National Federation was permitted to enter a maximum of two qualified athletes in each individual event, but only if both of them had attained the "A" standard qualification time at approved qualifying events. For this event, the "A" standard qualification time was 54.25 seconds. Federations could enter one athlete into the event if they met the "B" standard qualification time. For this event, the "B" standard qualification time was 56.15. Athletes could also enter the event if they had met an "A" or "B" standard in a different event and their Federation had not entered anyone else. Additional considerations applied to Federations who had few swimmers enter through the standard qualification times. Federations in this category could at least enter two men and two women into the competition, all of whom could enter into up to two events.

== Records ==
Prior to the competition, the existing world and championship records were as follows.

World record	Sarah Sjöström (SWE)	51.71	Budapest, Hungary	23 July 2017
Competition record	Sarah Sjöström (SWE)	51.71	Budapest, Hungary	23 July 2017

== Results ==
=== Heats ===
The heats were started on 15 February at 09:32.

Rank	Heat	Lane	Name	Nationality	Time	Notes
1	7	4	Shayna Jack	Australia	53.50	Q
2	8	5	Marrit Steenbergen	Netherlands	53.66	Q
3	9	4	Siobhán Haughey	Hong Kong	53.70	Q
4	9	1	Barbora Seemanová	Czech Republic	53.97	Q
5	9	5	Kate Douglass	United States	54.12	Q
6	8	3	Stephanie Balduccini	Brazil	54.25	Q
7	7	7	Kalia Antoniou	Cyprus	54.49	Q
7	9	3	Anna Hopkin	Great Britain	54.49	Q
9	9	6	Kornelia Fiedkiewicz	Poland	54.58	Q
10	8	6	Nagisa Ikemoto	Japan	54.70	Q
11	7	5	Michelle Coleman	Sweden	54.72	Q
12	9	2	Chiara Tarantino	Italy	54.87	Q
13	7	2	Kayla Sanchez	Philippines	54.88	Q
14	8	7	Charlotte Bonnet	France	55.12	Q
15	7	3	Ai Yanhan	China	55.19	Q-->WD
16	8	1	Nikolett Pádár	Hungary	55.21	Q-->WD
17	8	8	Maria Daza Garcia	Spain	55.34	Q
18	7	6	Erin Gallagher	South Africa	55.36	Q
19	8	0	Victoria Catterson	Ireland	55.44	
20	9	8	Jillian Crooks	Cayman Islands	55.61	
21	7	1	Daria Golovaty	Israel	55.71	
22	7	8	Quah Ting Wen	Singapore	55.82	
23	8	9	Lillian Slušná	Slovakia	56.01	
24	9	0	Elisbet Gámez	Cuba	56.20	
25	9	7	Smiltė Plytnykaitė	Lithuania	56.34	
26	8	2	Sarah Fournier	Canada	56.39	
27	6	4	Gloria Muzito	Uganda	56.55	
28	6	3	Carla Gonzalez	Venezuela	56.68	
29	6	5	Batbayaryn Enkhkhüslen	Mongolia	56.88	
30	6	6	McKenna DeBever	Peru	56.93	
31	9	9	Amel Melih	Algeria	57.00	
32	6	2	Beatriz Padrón	Costa Rica	57.56	
33	6	7	Emily Macdonald	Jamaica	57.57	
34	5	4	Maria Brunlehner	Kenya	57.84	
35	5	5	Adriana Giles	Bolivia	58.53	
36	6	8	Paige van der Westhuizen	Zimbabwe	58.66	
37	5	2	Rebecca Najem	Lebanon	58.90	
38	5	6	Ariana Dirkzwager	Laos	59.16	
39	5	7	Tilly Collymore	Grenada	59.19	
40	2	0	Saovanee Boonamphai	Thailand	59.36	
41	6	1	Dhinidhi Desinghu	India	59.41	
42	6	9	Ani Poghosyan	Armenia	59.43	
43	5	0	Aunjelique Liddie	Antigua and Barbuda	59.78	NR
44	5	1	Adaku Nwandu	Nigeria	59.83	
45	5	8	Hiruki De Silva	Sri Lanka	59.85	
46	5	3	Sara Pastrana	Honduras	59.94	
47	1	2	Mikaili Charlemagne	Saint Lucia	1:00.05	
48	4	0	María Fernández	Dominican Republic	1:01.03	
49	4	6	Riley Miller	U.S. Virgin Islands	1:01.08	
50	4	5	Mia Lee	Guam	1:01.22	
51	3	3	Arla Dermishi	Albania	1:01.23	
52	4	8	Jovana Kuljača	Montenegro	1:01.36	
53	1	6	Tessa Ip Hen Cheung	Mauritius	1:01.60	
54	4	1	Christina Rach	Eritrea	1:01.64	
55	2	8	Unilez Takyi	Ghana	1:01.68	
56	4	2	Jehanara Nabi	Pakistan	1:01.76	
57	4	3	Georgia-Leigh Vele	Papua New Guinea	1:01.88	
57	5	9	Ionnah Douillet	Benin	1:01.88	
59	4	4	Aleka Persaud	Guyana	1:02.20	
60	7	9	Gizem Güvenç	Turkey	1:02.55	
61	2	1	Zariel Nelson	Saint Vincent and the Grenadines	1:02.56	
62	4	9	Anastasiya Morginshtern	Turkmenistan	1:02.63	
63	4	7	Kaiya Brown	Samoa	1:02.84	
64	1	3	Noor Yussuf Abdulla	Bahrain	1:03.22	
65	3	4	Hayley Wong	Brunei	1:03.49	
66	3	5	Charissa Panuve	Tonga	1:03.60	
67	1	4	Angelina Smythe	Seychelles	1:03.63	
68	1	7	Mira Alshehhi	United Arab Emirates	1:04.17	
69	3	6	Kestra Kihleng	Federated States of Micronesia	1:04.93	
70	1	1	Alicia Mateus	Mozambique	1:05.53	
71	1	8	Lois Irishura	Burundi	1:05.78	
72	3	8	Rana Saadeldin	Sudan	1:05.94	
73	2	4	Loane Russet	Vanuatu	1:05.97	
74	2	9	Aishath Shaig	Maldives	1:06.27	
75	3	7	Siwakhile Dlamini	Eswatini	1:06.32	
76	3	2	Tayamika Changanamuno	Malawi	1:07.53	
77	3	1	Jasmine Schofield	Dominica	1:07.66	
78	3	9	Yuri Hosei	Palau	1:09.06	
79	3	0	Kayla Hepler	Marshall Islands	1:09.67	
80	2	5	Iman Kouraogo	Burkina Faso	1:12.41	
81	2	3	Imelda Ximenes Belo	Timor-Leste	1:15.56	
82	2	2	Daknishael Sanon	Haiti	1:17.09	
83	2	7	Salima Ahmadou	Niger	1:18.69	
84	1	5	Aichata Diabate	Mali	1:30.74	
	6	0	María Schutzmeier	Nicaragua	Did not start	
	7	0	Katarina Milutinović	Serbia	Did not start	
	8	4	Sarah Sjöström	Sweden	Did not start	
	2	6	Adele Gaitou	Togo	Disqualified	

=== Semifinals ===
The semifinals were held on 15 February at 19:11.

Rank	Heat	Lane	Name	Nationality	Time	Notes
1	1	4	Marrit Steenbergen	Netherlands	52.53	Q, NR
2	2	5	Siobhán Haughey	Hong Kong	52.92	Q
3	1	6	Anna Hopkin	Great Britain	53.12	Q
4	2	4	Shayna Jack	Australia	53.16	Q
5	2	3	Kate Douglass	United States	53.31	Q
6	1	5	Barbora Seemanová	Czech Republic	53.76	Q
7	2	2	Kornelia Fiedkiewicz	Poland	54.01	Q, NR
8	1	3	Stephanie Balduccini	Brazil	54.07	Q
9	2	7	Michelle Coleman	Sweden	54.25	
10	1	7	Chiara Tarantino	Italy	54.51	
11	1	8	Erin Gallagher	South Africa	54.53	
12	1	1	Charlotte Bonnet	France	54.72	
13	1	2	Nagisa Ikemoto	Japan	54.76	
14	2	6	Kalia Antoniou	Cyprus	55.04	
15	2	1	Kayla Sanchez	Philippines	55.07	
16	2	8	Maria Daza Garcia	Spain	55.49	

=== Final ===
The final was held on 16 February at 19:02.

Rank	Lane	Name	Nationality	Time	Notes
1st place, gold medalist(s)	4	Marrit Steenbergen	Netherlands	52.26	NR
2nd place, silver medalist(s)	5	Siobhán Haughey	Hong Kong	52.56	
3rd place, bronze medalist(s)	6	Shayna Jack	Australia	52.83	
4	2	Kate Douglass	United States	53.02	
5	3	Anna Hopkin	Great Britain	53.09	
6	8	Stephanie Balduccini	Brazil	54.05	
7	1	Kornelia Fiedkiewicz	Poland	54.06	
8	7	Barbora Seemanová	Czech Republic	54.64	

== Sources ==
- "Competition Regulations" (PDF). World Aquatics. Archived (PDF) from the original on 15 February 2026.
