= Sudan at the 2015 World Aquatics Championships =

- Flag of Sudan
- FINA code: SUD
- National federation: Sudan Swimming Federation

in Kazan, Russia
- Competitors: 5 in 2 sports
- Medals: Gold 0 Silver 0 Bronze 0 Total 0

World Aquatics Championships appearances
- 1973; 1975; 1978; 1982; 1986; 1991; 1994; 1998; 2001; 2003; 2005; 2007; 2009; 2011; 2013; 2015; 2017; 2019; 2022; 2023; 2024

Sudan competed at the 2015 World Aquatics Championships in Kazan, Russia from 24 July to 9 August 2015.

== Open water swimming ==
Sudan has qualified two swimmers to compete in the open water marathon.

Athlete	Event	Time	Rank
Ahmed Abdelrahman Adam	Men's 5 km	OTL	
Amgad Elssafflawe	Men's 5 km	OTL	

== Swimming ==
Sudanese swimmers have achieved qualifying standards in the following events (up to a maximum of 2 swimmers in each event at the A-standard entry time, and 1 at the B-standard):

Men

Athlete	Event	Heat		Semifinal		Final	
Athlete	Event	Time	Rank	Time	Rank	Time	Rank
Abdelaziz Mohammed Ahmed	50 m freestyle	27.88	105	did not advance			
Abdelaziz Mohammed Ahmed	50 m butterfly	29.66	67	did not advance			
Rami Elias	200 m backstroke	2:19.53	37	did not advance			
Rami Elias	200 m individual medley	2:20.94	46	did not advance			

Women

Athlete	Event	Heat		Semifinal		Final	
Athlete	Event	Time	Rank	Time	Rank	Time	Rank
Haneen Ibrahim	50 m freestyle	36.14	106	did not advance			
