= Sudan at the 2024 World Aquatics Championships =

- Flag of Sudan
- World Aquatics code: SUD
- National federation: Sudan Amateur Swimming Association

in Doha, Qatar
- Competitors: 4 in 1 sport
- Medals: Gold 0 Silver 0 Bronze 0 Total 0

World Aquatics Championships appearances
- 1973; 1975; 1978; 1982; 1986; 1991; 1994; 1998; 2001; 2003; 2005; 2007; 2009; 2011; 2013; 2015; 2017; 2019; 2022; 2023; 2024; 2025

Sudan competed at the 2024 World Aquatics Championships in Doha, Qatar from 2 to 18 February.

== Competitors ==
The following is the list of competitors in the Championships.

Sport	Men	Women	Total
Swimming	2	2	4
Total	2	2	4

== Swimming ==
Sudan entered four swimmers.

Men

Athlete	Event	Heat		Semifinal		Final	
Athlete	Event	Time	Rank	Time	Rank	Time	Rank
Abobakr Abass	100 metre breaststroke	1:04.40	54	Did not advance			
Abobakr Abass	200 metre breaststroke	2:20.80	28	Did not advance			
Ziyad Saleem	100 metre backstroke	55.44	26	Did not advance			
Ziyad Saleem	200 metre backstroke	2:00.53	20	Did not advance			

Women

Athlete	Event	Heat		Semifinal		Final	
Athlete	Event	Time	Rank	Time	Rank	Time	Rank
Leena Mohamedahmed	50 metre freestyle	31.83	97	Did not advance			
Leena Mohamedahmed	100 metre butterfly	1:36.65	45	Did not advance			
Rana Saadeldin	100 metre freestyle	1:05.94	72	Did not advance			
Rana Saadeldin	50 metre butterfly	32.03	49	Did not advance			
