= Sudan at the 2011 World Aquatics Championships =

- Flag of Sudan
- FINA code: SUD
- National federation: Sudan Swimming Federation

in Shanghai, China
- Competitors: 3 in 1 sport
- Medals: Gold 0 Silver 0 Bronze 0 Total 0

World Aquatics Championships appearances
- 1973; 1975; 1978; 1982; 1986; 1991; 1994; 1998; 2001; 2003; 2005; 2007; 2009; 2011; 2013; 2015; 2017; 2019; 2022; 2023; 2024

Sudan competed at the 2011 World Aquatics Championships in Shanghai, China between July 16 and 31, 2011.

== Swimming ==
Sudan qualified 3 swimmers.

Men

Athlete	Event	Heats		Semifinals		Final	
Athlete	Event	Time	Rank	Time	Rank	Time	Rank
Mohamed Eltayeb	Men's 50m Freestyle	29.49	105	did not advance			
Mohamed Eltayeb	Men's 50m Backstroke	35.98	38	did not advance			
Mohamed Abdelrawf Mahmoud	Men's 50m Freestyle	27.67	87	did not advance			
Mohamed Abdelrawf Mahmoud	Men's 50m Butterfly	29.02	44	did not advance			

Women

Athlete	Event	Heats		Semifinals		Final	
Athlete	Event	Time	Rank	Time	Rank	Time	Rank
Mhasin El Nour Fadlalla	Women's 50m Freestyle	38.15	81	did not advance			
