= Swimming at the 2023 World Aquatics Championships – Men's 100 metre backstroke =

Men's 100 metre backstroke at the 2023 World Aquatics Championships
- Venue: Marine Messe Fukuoka
- Location: Fukuoka, Japan
- Dates: 24 July (heats and semifinals); 25 July (final)
- Competitors: 62 from 56 nations
- Winning time: 52.22

Medalists
gold medal	Ryan Murphy	United States
silver medal	Thomas Ceccon	Italy
bronze medal	Hunter Armstrong	United States

The men's 100 metre backstroke competition at the 2023 World Aquatics Championships was held on 24 and 25 July 2023.

== Records ==
Prior to the competition, the existing world and championship records were as follows.

World record	Thomas Ceccon (ITA)	51.60	Budapest, Hungary	20 June 2022
Competition record	Thomas Ceccon (ITA)	51.60	Budapest, Hungary	20 June 2022

== Results ==
=== Heats ===
The heats were started on 24 July at 10:51.

Rank	Heat	Lane	Name	Nationality	Time	Notes
1	6	5	Xu Jiayu	China	52.87	Q
2	7	1	Hubert Kós	Hungary	53.12	Q, NR
3	7	3	Ksawery Masiuk	Poland	53.15	Q
4	6	4	Ryan Murphy	United States	53.43	Q
5	6	7	Oliver Morgan	Great Britain	53.52	Q
6	5	3	Mewen Tomac	France	53.57	Q
6	6	6	Ole Braunschweig	Germany	53.57	Q
6	7	2	Roman Mityukov	Switzerland	53.57	Q
9	5	6	Hugo González	Spain	53.70	Q
10	5	1	João Costa	Portugal	53.71	Q, NR
11	6	1	Bradley Woodward	Australia	53.72	Q
12	7	7	Kacper Stokowski	Poland	53.81	Q
13	6	2	Andrew Jeffcoat	New Zealand	53.82	Q
14	7	4	Thomas Ceccon	Italy	53.84	Q
15	5	5	Yohann Ndoye-Brouard	France	53.90	Q
16	5	4	Hunter Armstrong	United States	53.94	Q
17	7	6	Isaac Cooper	Australia	53.95	
18	6	3	Ryosuke Irie	Japan	53.98	
19	7	5	Apostolos Christou	Greece	54.01	
20	5	8	Lee Ju-ho	South Korea	54.21	
21	5	2	Benedek Kovács	Hungary	54.24	
22	6	8	Conor Ferguson	Ireland	54.36	
23	7	0	Guilherme Basseto	Brazil	54.45	
24	6	0	Tomáš Franta	Czech Republic	54.50	
25	7	8	Cameron Brooker	Great Britain	54.54	
26	5	7	Javier Acevedo	Canada	54.58	
27	4	5	Markus Lie	Norway	54.66	
28	4	7	Chuang Mu-lun	Chinese Taipei	54.95	NR
29	4	3	Berke Saka	Turkey	55.09	
30	5	9	Erikas Grigaitis	Lithuania	55.23	
31	7	9	Srihari Nataraj	India	55.26	
32	4	4	Quah Zheng Wen	Singapore	55.30	
33	5	0	Michael Laitarovsky	Israel	55.63	
34	4	6	Andrei-Mircea Anghel	Romania	55.77	
35	4	1	Diego Camacho	Mexico	55.80	
36	4	2	Ģirts Feldbergs	Latvia	55.91	
37	4	8	Ziyad Ahmed	Sudan	56.02	
38	3	3	Jack Kirby	Barbados	56.08	
39	3	5	Charles Hockin	Paraguay	56.56	
40	3	8	Maximillian Wilson	U.S. Virgin Islands	56.65	
41	2	5	Merdan Ataýew	Turkmenistan	56.96	
42	3	9	Jack Harvey	Bermuda	57.04	NR
43	4	9	Armin Evert Lelle	Estonia	57.06	
44	3	6	Noe Pantskhava	Georgia	57.10	
45	2	3	Yazan Al-Bawwab	Palestine	57.16	
46	2	6	Denilson Cyprianos	Zimbabwe	57.29	NR
47	3	0	Davante Carey	Bahamas	57.50	
48	3	7	Filippos Iakovidis	Cyprus	57.51	
49	4	0	Farrel Tangkas	Indonesia	58.06	
50	3	2	Lau Shiu Yue	Hong Kong	58.21	
51	3	4	Jerard Jacinto	Suspended Member Federation	58.40	
52	3	1	Homer Abbasi	Iran	58.45	
53	2	4	Zhulian Lavdaniti	Albania	58.48	
54	2	2	Matthieu Seye	Senegal	58.59	
55	1	4	Mohamad Zubaid	Kuwait	59.56	
56	2	0	Zeke Chan	Brunei	59.61	
57	2	8	Zackary Gresham	Grenada	59.68	
58	2	1	Bede Aitu	Cook Islands	1:01.15	
59	1	3	Omer Huraish	Iraq	1:03.15	
60	1	5	Ali Imaan	Maldives	1:04.98	
61	2	9	Adnan Kabuye	Uganda	1:05.57	
	2	7	Erkhes Enkhtur	Mongolia	DSQ	
	6	9	Bernhard Reitshammer	Austria	DNS	

=== Semifinals ===
The semifinals were started on 24 July at 20:17.

Rank	Heat	Lane	Name	Nationality	Time	Notes
1	1	1	Thomas Ceccon	Italy	52.16	Q
2	2	4	Xu Jiayu	China	52.42	Q
3	1	5	Ryan Murphy	United States	52.56	Q
4	1	3	Mewen Tomac	France	52.86	Q
5	2	8	Yohann Ndoye-Brouard	France	53.06	Q
6	1	4	Hubert Kós	Hungary	53.17	Q
7	2	5	Ksawery Masiuk	Poland	53.20	Q
8	1	8	Hunter Armstrong	United States	53.21	Q
9	2	3	Oliver Morgan	Great Britain	53.26	
10	1	6	Roman Mityukov	Switzerland	53.32	NR
11	2	2	Hugo González	Spain	53.38	
12	2	1	Andrew Jeffcoat	New Zealand	53.46	
13	2	7	Bradley Woodward	Australia	53.73	
14	1	7	Kacper Stokowski	Poland	53.96	
15	2	6	Ole Braunschweig	Germany	54.00	
16	1	2	João Costa	Portugal	54.30	

=== Final ===
The final was held on 25 July at 20:59.

Rank	Lane	Name	Nationality	Time	Notes
1st place, gold medalist(s)	3	Ryan Murphy	United States	52.22	
2nd place, silver medalist(s)	4	Thomas Ceccon	Italy	52.27	
3rd place, bronze medalist(s)	8	Hunter Armstrong	United States	52.58	
4	5	Xu Jiayu	China	52.64	
5	2	Yohann Ndoye-Brouard	France	52.84	
6	1	Ksawery Masiuk	Poland	52.92	
7	7	Hubert Kós	Hungary	53.11	
8	6	Mewen Tomac	France	53.16	
