= Folarin Ogunsola =

Gambian swimmer

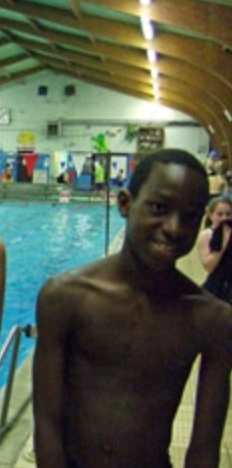
- Folarin Ogunsola

Personal information
- Nickname: Fola
- Nationality: Gambia
- Born: June 23, 1997 (age 29) London

Sport
- Sport: Swimming
- Strokes: freestyle
- Club: Canterbury
- College team: Simon Langton Grammar School for Boys

Folarin L. Ogunsola (born 23 June 1997) is a Gambian swimmer. He competed in the 50 m freestyle and 50 m backstroke events (the latter of which he did not start) at the 2011 World Aquatics Championships and in the 50 m freestyle and 50 m butterfly events at the 2013 World Aquatics Championships.
