= Atuhaire Ambala =

Ugandan swimmer (born 2001)

Personal information
- Born: 26 April 2001 (age 25)

Sport
- Sport: Swimming

Atuhaire Ogola Ambala (born 26 April 2001)is a Ugandan competitive swimmer. He has represented Uganda at multiple major international competitions, such as the 2019 World Aquatics Championships in Gwangju, South Korea. He competed in the men's 50 metre freestyle and men's 100 metre freestyle events. He also competed in the 4 × 100 metre mixed freestyle relay. He also represented his country at the 2020 Summer Olympics in Tokyo and the 2019 World Aquatics Championships. Atuhaire was named Uganda's Best Male Swimmer in 2019 by the Uganda Swimming Federation.

== Early life and background ==
Ambala was born on 26 April 2001.

He is associated with the Dolphins Swim Club, one of Uganda's premier competitive swim teams. He has competed internationally and nationally from a young age, and has emerged as one of the best male swimmers in Uganda.

== International career ==
In 2018, Ambala competed in several events at the African Swimming Championships held in Algiers, Algeria, gaining experience against top continental swimmers.

He represented Uganda at the 2019 World Aquatics Championships in Gwangju, South Korea. He competed in the men's 50 metre freestyle events, and also participated in the 4 * 100 metre mixed freestyle relay. His performance included times of 24.69 seconds in the 50m and 53.89 seconds in the 100m freestyle, both marking competitive entries for Uganda at the global level.

In 2019, he competed in the men's 100 metre butterfly event at the African Games held in Rabat, Morocco.

He represented Uganda at the 2020 Summer Olympics in Tokyo, Japan. He competed in the men's 100 metre freestyle. During the Olympic heats, he finished seventh in his heat, with a time of 54.23 seconds, ending 63rd overall out of 70 swimmers and narrowly missing advancement to the semifinals. This marked Uganda's return to the men's 100 m freestyle event at the Olympics - the first such attempt since 1984.

== See also ==
- List of Ugandan records in swimming
- Uganda at the 2020 Summer Olympics
