= Tara Kisawuzi =

Ugandan swimmer (born 2008)

Personal information
- Full name: Tara Ann Mary Naluwoza Kisawuzi
- Nationality: Ugandan
- Born: 5 August 2008 (age 18)

Sport
- Sport: Swimming
- Club: Gators Swim Club

Tara Ann Mary Naluwoza Kisawuzi (born 5 August 2008) also known as Tara Kisawuzi is a Ugandan swimmer. She has competed for Uganda at international competitions, including the World Aquatics Championships, World Junior Swimming Championships, African Games, Africa Aquatics Junior Swimming Championships and Islamic Solidarity Games.

== Swimming career ==
Tara began swimming with Seals Swim Club in 2017. She moved to Altona Swim Club in 2019 and later joined Gators Swim Club.

In 2022, Tara won eight gold medals in the 13-14 age group at the CANA Zone 3 Swimming Championships in Tanzania. Later that year, she competed at the World Junior Swimming Championships in Lima, Peru. She recorded 28.97 seconds in the 50 metre butterfly and 27.82 seconds in the 50 metre freestyle.

In March 2023, Tara set a Ugandan national record in the 200 metre butterfly with a time of 2:34.52. She competed at the 2023 Africa Aquatics Junior Swimming Championships and the World Aquatics Championships.

In 2024, she represented Uganda at the African Games in Ghana, where she competed in the mixed 4 × 100 metre freestyle and mixed 4 × 100 metre medley relays.

In 2025, Tara competed at the Africa Aquatics Junior Swimming Championships in Cairo, the World Junior Championships and the Islamic Solidarity Games in Riyadh. She was named Uganda Aquatics' Junior Female Swimmer of the Year in 2025.

In May 2026, Kisawuzi competed at the African Aquatics Swimming Championships in Oran, Algeria. She finished seventh in the women's 50 metre freestyle final at 27.81 seconds.

== See also ==
- World Aquatics Championships
- Uganda at the African Games
- World Aquatics Junior Swimming Championships
- African Junior Swimming Championships
