= Sudan at the 2023 World Aquatics Championships =

- Flag of Sudan
- FINA code: SUD
- National federation: Sudan Amateur Swimming Association

in Fukuoka, Japan
- Competitors: 2 in 1 sport
- Medals: Gold 0 Silver 0 Bronze 0 Total 0

World Aquatics Championships appearances
- 1973; 1975; 1978; 1982; 1986; 1991; 1994; 1998; 2001; 2003; 2005; 2007; 2009; 2011; 2013; 2015; 2017; 2019; 2022; 2023; 2024

Sudan is set to compete at the 2023 World Aquatics Championships in Fukuoka, Japan from 14 to 30 July.

== Swimming ==
Sudan entered 4 swimmers.

Men

Athlete	Event	Heat		Semifinal		Final	
Athlete	Event	Time	Rank	Time	Rank	Time	Rank
Ziyad Ahmed	100 metre backstroke	56.02	37	Did not advance			
Ziyad Ahmed	200 metre backstroke	2:00.52	24	Did not advance			

Women

Athlete	Event	Heat		Semifinal		Final	
Athlete	Event	Time	Rank	Time	Rank	Time	Rank
Rana Saadeldin	100 metre freestyle	1:08.38	71	Did not advance			
Rana Saadeldin	50 metre backstroke	36.32 NR	61	Did not advance			
