= Haneen Ibrahim =

Sudanese swimmer

Personal information
- Native name: حنين سامي بشير إبراهيم
- Full name: Haneen Sami Bashir Ibrahim
- Nationality: Sudanese
- Born: 29 June 2000 (age 25)

Sport
- Sport: Swimming

Haneen Sami Bashir Ibrahim (Arabic: حنين سامي بشير إبراهيم; born 29 June 2000) is a Sudanese swimmer.

== career ==
She competed in the women's 50 metre freestyle event at the 2016 Summer Olympics, where she ranked 84th with a time of 36.25 seconds. She did not advance to the semifinals. Ibrahim holds the national record in women's 50 metre freestyle.

In 2019, she represented Sudan at the 2019 World Aquatics Championships held in Gwangju, South Korea. She competed in the women's 50 metre freestyle and women's 100 metre freestyle events. In both events she did not advance to compete in the semi-finals. In 2021, she competed in the women's 50 metre freestyle event at the 2020 Summer Olympics held in Tokyo, Japan.
