= Sudan at the 2019 World Aquatics Championships =

- Flag of Sudan
- FINA code: SUD
- National federation: Sudan Amateur Swimming Association

in Gwangju, South Korea
- Competitors: 4 in 2 sports
- Medals: Gold 0 Silver 0 Bronze 0 Total 0

World Aquatics Championships appearances
- 1973; 1975; 1978; 1982; 1986; 1991; 1994; 1998; 2001; 2003; 2005; 2007; 2009; 2011; 2013; 2015; 2017; 2019; 2022; 2023; 2024

Sudan competed at the 2019 World Aquatics Championships in Gwangju, South Korea from 12 to 28 July.

== Open water swimming ==
Sudan qualified one male open water swimmer.

Men

Athlete	Event	Time	Rank
Mohamed Ibrahim	Men's 5 km	OTL	

== Swimming ==
Sudan entered three swimmers.

Men

Athlete	Event	Heat		Semifinal		Final	
Athlete	Event	Time	Rank	Time	Rank	Time	Rank
Abobakr Abass	50 m freestyle	26.21	112	did not advance			
Abobakr Abass	100 m breaststroke	1:09.34	82	did not advance			
Izzeldin Ibrahim	50 m breaststroke	34.52	68	did not advance			
Izzeldin Ibrahim	50 m butterfly	28.62	78	did not advance			

Women

Athlete	Event	Heat		Semifinal		Final	
Athlete	Event	Time	Rank	Time	Rank	Time	Rank
Haneen Ibrahim	50 m freestyle	34.81	96	did not advance			
Haneen Ibrahim	100 m freestyle	1:22.18	93	did not advance			
