= Hadija Namanda =

Ugandan sports administrator

- Born: Hadija Namanda; November 18, 1975 (age 49); Kampala District
- Occupation: Sports administrator
- Children: Tendo Mukalazi and Kirabo Namutebi
- Parent(s): Sawuya Naggayi (mother) and Abdu Ssenyondo (father)

Hadija Namanda sometimes spelt as Hadijah Namanda born 19 November 1975, is a Ugandan sports administrator and Election officer. She was the first female president in the history of the Uganda Volleyball Federation(2017-2021). She is the proprietor of Tena Tennis Academy and serves as the treasurer of the African Volleyball Confederation (CAVB) in East Africa. Hadijah also works in the Voter Data Management department at the Uganda Electoral Commission.

== Early life ==
She is the first born of the seven children of the late Sawuya Naggayi and Abdu Ssenyondo of Masaka District. Hadija attended Shimoni Demonstration School for primary education and Gayaza High School while she joined Makerere University for her first degree. Hadija currently she pursuing a master's degree in Sports management at the German sports University of Cologne.

== Career ==
Hadija took the mantle as Federation of Uganda Volleyball Federation president on 9 January 2017 after succeeding Sadik Nasiwu. In October 2020, Hadija contested for a gender minority position at the Confederation of African Volleyball (CAVB) however, she did not emerge victorious after Lesotho counterpart won the election. Namanda has practiced a number of sports, including table tennis, in which she was ranked ninth in Africa in 1996, and badminton. She is a certified A Level II FIVB Volleyball Coach and an international referee of Volleyball.

== Family ==
She is a mother to Tendo Mukalazi and Kirabo Namutebi.
