= Abdelrahim Mohamed Abdelrahim =

Sudanese swimmer (born 1994)

Personal information
- National team: Sudan
- Born: 1994 (age 31–32)

Sport
- Sport: Swimming
- Strokes: Backstroke, butterfly, freestyle

Abdelrahim Mohamed Abdelrahim, or Abdel Mohamed Abdelrahim (born 1994) is a Sudanese swimmer. He competed in the 100 m freestyle, 50 m backstroke and 50 m butterfly events at the 2012 FINA World Swimming Championships (25 m) and in the 50 m freestyle event at the 2013 Asian Indoor and Martial Arts Games. Abdelrahim also took part in the 50 m freestyle and 50 m butterfly events at the 2013 World Aquatics Championships.
