= African Junior Swimming Championships =

Swimming competition in Africa

African Junior Swimming Championships are the African championships in the sport of Swimming. It is organised by the African Swimming Confederation (Africa Aquatics) and held biennially. The competitor age In 2019 was two categories the competitor age is for both sexes 13 to 14 and 15 to 16 years. From 2021 the competitor age is for girls 14 to 17 years and for boys 15 to 18 years.

The most recent edition of the Championships was held in September 2019 in Tunis, Tunisia.

== Championships ==
Number	Year	Host city	Host country	Dates	Nations	Swimmers	Events	Best nation
1	1988	Harare	Zimbabwe	7–12 December				Egypt
2	1992	Casablanca	Morocco	20–22 August				Egypt
3	1994	Cairo	Egypt	22–24 September				South Africa
4	1996	Beau Bassin	Mauritius	6–7 December				South Africa
5	1998	Germiston	South Africa	3–6 December				South Africa
6	2003	Casablanca	Morocco	11–13 August				South Africa
7	2005	Beau Bassin	Mauritius	18–21 August				South Africa
8	2009	Beau Bassin	Mauritius	22–25 October				South Africa
9	2011	Port Harcourt	Nigeria	1–4 December				South Africa
10	2013	Lusaka	Zambia	28 November–1 December				South Africa
11	2015	Cairo	Egypt	17–20 October				Egypt
12	2017	Cairo	Egypt	28–31 March				South Africa
13	2019	Tunis	Tunisia	11–15 September			40	South Africa
14	2021	Accra	Ghana	11–17 October			42	South Africa
15	2023	Saint Pierre	Mauritius	6–10 December				Egypt
16	2025	Cairo	Egypt	30 April–3 May			42	South Africa
17	2026	Oran	Algeria	5–10 May			42	South Africa

== See also ==
- African Swimming Championships
- African Masters Swimming Championships
- Swimming at the African Games
