= Mhasin Fadlalla =

Sudanese swimmer (born 1994)

Personal information
- Native name: محاسن النور فضل الله
- Full name: Mhasin Al-Noor Fadlalla
- Nationality: Sudanese
- Born: February 20, 1994 (age 32) Khartoum, Sudan
- Height: 158 cm (62 in) (2012)
- Weight: 40 kg (88 lb) (2012)

Sport
- Sport: Swimming

Mhasin Fadlalla (born 20 February 1994) is a Sudanese swimmer who competed in the women's 50 metre freestyle as one of two women in the Sudan squad at the 2012 Summer Olympics in London, United Kingdom.

== Early life ==
Mhasin Al-Noor Fadlalla was born on 20 February 1994 in Khartoum.

== Swimming career ==
She appeared at the 2011 FINA World Aquatics Championships in Shanghai, China. She finished in 81st position overall out of the 87 athletes in the 50 metre freestyle with a time of 38.15 seconds.

Fadlalla was selected as part of the Sudanese team for the 2012 Summer Olympics in London, United Kingdom. She was one of two women in the squad, alongside Amina Bakhit. Prior to the start of the games, Fadlalla was invited to train using the swimming pool at the Khartoum American School, Khartoum. The school had heard that she was in need of a training facility and wanted to give something back in Sudan. Fadlalla was sponsored by telecommunications company Zain Group for her appearance at the London Games.

On 30 July, she attended the Sudanese embassy in London for an Iftar to break her Ramadan fast with other members of the team. She competed in the second heat of the first round of the women's 50 metre freestyle competition on 3 August. Fadlalla finished in seventh position out of the seven swimmers, with a time of 35.07 seconds, immediately behind Aminata Aboubakar Yacoub from Republic of the Congo (35.64 seconds). Fadlalla failed to qualify for the semi-finals, and her Olympic competition ended with her single appearance. She finished overall in 70th position, one place ahead of fellow African Nafissatou Moussa Adamou from Niger.
