= Jamila Lunkuse =

Ugandan swimmer (born 1997)

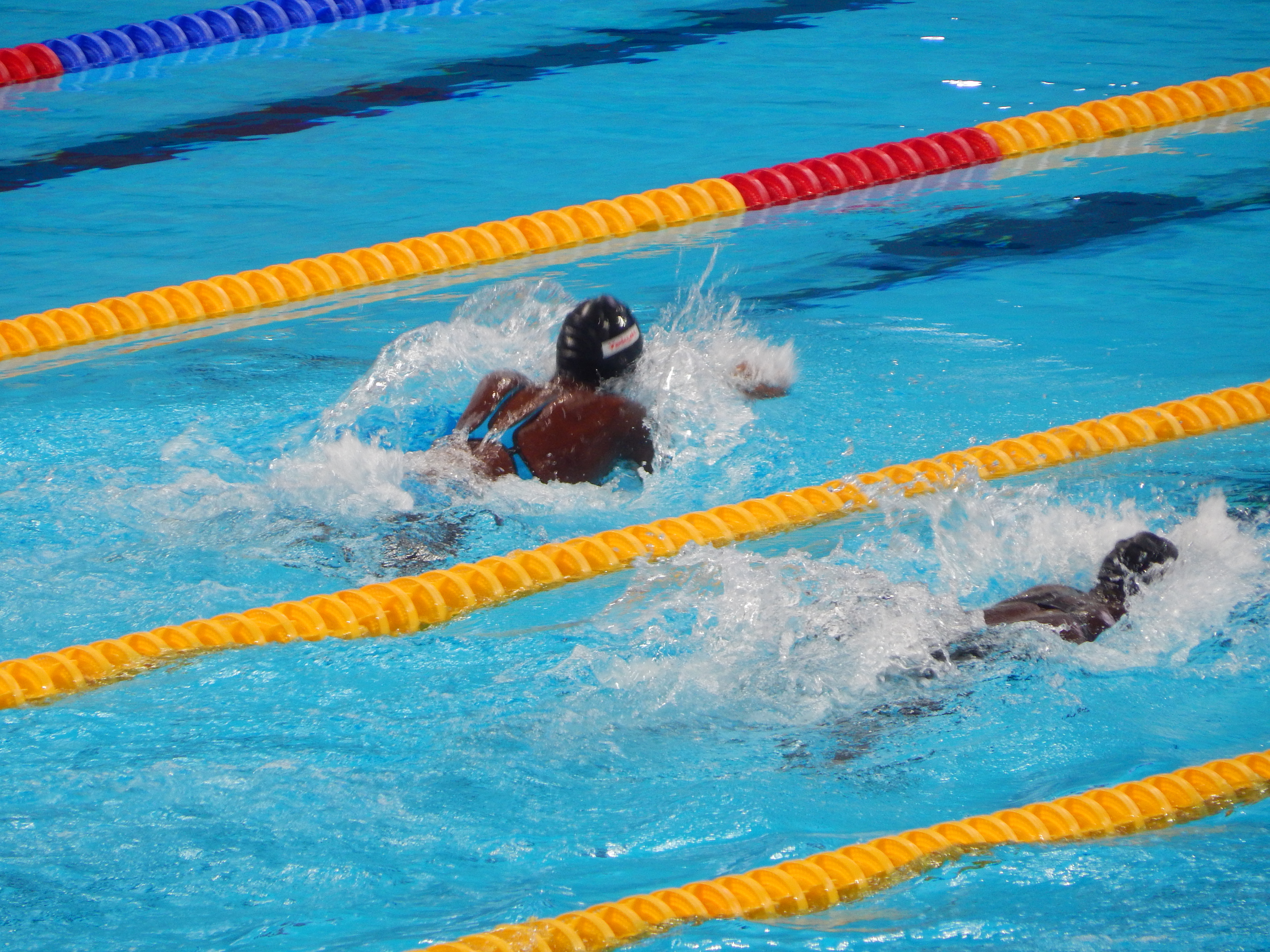
- In lane 4 (right) in Kazan, 2015

Personal information
- Nationality: Ugandan
- Born: 1 January 1997 (age 29)

Sport
- Sport: Swimming

Jamila Lunkuse (born 1 January 1997) is a Ugandan swimmer. She competed in the women's 50m freestyle at the 2012 Summer Olympics in London, finishing with a time of 28.44 seconds in 52nd place in the heats. She also represented Uganda at the Rio 2016 Olympics.

== Education and background ==
Jamila Lunkuse is one of four children born to Yusuf and Janat Nansubuga Nsibambi. She joined Plymouth College in 2013 on a sports scholarship before attending the University of Brighton to study business and marketing.

== Notable achievements ==
In 2013, Lunkuse won eight medals at the CANA Zone 3 and 4 Swimming Championships held in Lusaka, Zambia. She won seven golds in the 50m breaststroke (competition record), 100m breaststroke, 200m breaststroke, 100m freestyle, 200m freestyle, 50m butterfly and 200m. Her silver medal was in the 50m freestyle.

== Awards ==
- 2013 - Rwenzori Uganda Sports Press Association Sportsman of the Month (April)

== See also ==
- List of Ugandan records in swimming
