= Jesse Ssengonzi =

Ugandan swimmer

Jesse Ssengonzi (born August 27, 2002) is a Ugandan swimmer. Ssengonzi swam collegiately at the University of Chicago, where he was a two-time champion in the NCAA Division III men's 100m butterfly. He represented Uganda at the 2024 Summer Olympics, competing in the men's 100m butterfly; despite ranking 31st overall in the event, he set a Ugandan national record for the event.

== Personal life ==
Ssengonzi graduated from the University of Chicago in 2024 with a degree in computer science and economics. His father Robert, a population and health scientist specializing in HIV/AIDS research, died in 2018. He was born in Raleigh, North Carolina and grew up in Cary, North Carolina but his parents retained Ugandan citizenship.

== See also ==
- Ugandan Americans
