= Avice Meya =

Ugandan swimmer (born 1994)

Personal information
- Nationality: Ugandan
- Born: 2 December 1994 (age 31) Kampala, Uganda

Sport
- Sport: Swimming

Avice Meya (born 2 December 1994) is a Ugandan swimmer. She competed in the women's 50 metre freestyle event at the 2017 World Aquatics Championships. She also competed in two events at the 2018 Commonwealth Games. In 2019, she represented Uganda at the 2019 World Aquatics Championships held in Gwangju, South Korea.

== Personal life ==
Meya studied at Kyambogo University. Her father, Andrew, coached the Uganda national cricket team.
