= Gloria Muzito =

Ugandan-Swedish swimmer (born 2002)

Personal information
- National team: Sweden; Uganda
- Born: Gloria Anna Muzito; 29 November 2002 (age 23) Sundsvall, Sweden

Sport
- Sport: Swimming
- Strokes: Freestyle; Butterfly
- Club: Dolphins Swim Club, Uganda; Njurunda Simsallskap, Sweden
- College team: Florida State Seminoles
- Coach: Joseph Kaboggoza (Uganda national team); Muzafaru Muwanguzi (Uganda national team); Neal Studd (Florida State Seminoles)
Medal record
Women's swimming
Representing Uganda
African Games
Bronze medal – third place	2024 Accra	100 m freestyle
African Championships
Gold medal – first place	2024 Luanda	100 m freestyle
Bronze medal – third place	2024 Luanda	50 m freestyle
Representing Sweden
European Youth Summer Olympic Festival
Silver medal – second place	2017 Gyor	Girls' 50 m freestyle
Bronze medal – third place	2017 Gyor	4x100 mixed freestyle relay

Gloria Anna Muzito (born 29 November 2002) is a Ugandan-Swedish swimmer. She won a bronze medal at the 2023 African Games in the 100m freestyle, thereby setting a national record.

== Background and education ==
Muzito was born in Sweden to a Ugandan father and Swedish mother. She studied at Hedbergska Skolan Sundsvall as well as the Sundsvall Gymnasium.

She has been named to a number of Atlantic Coast Conference honours, such as the All-ACC Academic Team and ACC Honor Roll between 2021 and 2022. In late 2022, she was one of the student-athlete recipients of the 2022 Go Teach Dr Pepper Tuition Giveaway to help further her career in education. As of March 2024, Muzito was a student at Florida State University, where she was studying sports management.

== Swimming career ==
On a national level, Muzito represents Uganda. She represented Uganda at the 2024 World Aquatics Championships in Doha, Qatar.

Muzito also represented Sweden between 2014 and 2022, and was a part of the Swedish national junior swim team. She participated at the 2016 European Junior Swimming Championships and the 2017 European Youth Summer Olympic Festival, where alongside Robin Hanson, she won a bronze medal in the mixed relay.

She is also a part of the Florida State University's swim team under its sport collective, the Florida State Seminoles. Muzito was part of the Dolphins Swim Club in Kampala as well as Sundsvall Simsällskap in Sweden.

== See also ==
- List of Ugandan records in swimming

Olympic Games
Preceded by Shadiri Bwogi; Kirabo Namutebi	Flag bearer for Uganda; Paris 2024 with Charles Kagimu	Succeeded by Incumbent
