= Tendo Mukalazi =

Ugandan swimmer (born 2002)

Personal information
- Nickname: "The Baltimore Bullet"
- National team: Uganda
- Born: 15 June 2002 (age 24) Kampala, Uganda
- Height: 6 ft 4 in (1.93 m)
- Weight: 75 kg (165 lb)
- Website: www.tendomukalazi.com

Sport
- Sport: Swimming
- Strokes: Butterfly, individual medley, freestyle, backstroke
- Club: Dolphins Aquatic Club
- Coach: Muzafaru Muwanguzi

Tendo Mukalazi (born 15 June 2002) is a Ugandan swimmer. In the 2022 Commonwealth Games, he represented Uganda in swimming, participating in five events: men’s 50m freestyle, men’s 100m freestyle, mixed 4 x 100m freestyle relay, mixed 4 x 100m medley relay, and men’s 50m breaststroke.

== Early life and education ==
Mukalazi was born and raised in Kampala the capital city of Uganda. He attended British School Kampala. Mukalazi is the eldest brother of Kirabo Namutebi. His mother, Hadija Namanda, is the former president of the Uganda Volleyball Federation. Mukalazi began swimming at the age of seven.

== Swimming career ==
He was the second runner-up at CANA Zone III Championships in Dar es Salaam in 2017 in Tanzania where he won four gold medals and four silver medals.

== Training ==
Mukalazi is coached by Muzafaru Muwanguzi.

== Records ==
=== Personal bests ===
Event	Time	Venue	Date
50 m Backstroke	28.24 (r)	Kazan	27–29 January 2022
50 m Butterfly	00:26.55	Kazan	27–29 January 2022
50 m Butterfly	00:25.58	Petersburg, Russia	27–28 December 2021
100 m freestyle	53.01	Golden Orlando	12–13 June 2021
