= Kirabo Namutebi =

Ugandan swimmer (born 2005)

Personal information
- National team: Uganda
- Born: Kirabo Namutebi; 8 February 2005 (age 21) Kampala
- Parent: Hadijah Namanda (mother)

Sport
- Sport: Swimming
- Strokes: Freestyle
- Coach: Muzafaru Muwanguzi
Medal record
Women's swimming
Representing Uganda
African Championships
Silver medal – second place	2022 Tunis	50 m freestyle
Silver medal – second place	2024 Luanda	50 m freestyle
Bronze medal – third place	2024 Luanda	50 m breaststroke
Islamic Solidarity Games
Silver medal – second place	2021 Konya	50 m freestyle

Kirabo Namutebi (born 8 February 2005) is a Ugandan swimmer who represented Uganda in the Women's 50m Freestyle Heat at the 2020 Olympic Games in Tokyo. During the 2020 ISF World School Games in France, she led team Uganda to France.

== Early life ==
Namutebi was born and raised in Kampala, the capital city of Uganda. She is the second born. She attends British School Kampala. Her mother, Hadija Namanda, is the former president of the Uganda Volleyball Federation. Namutebi began swimming at the age of seven.

== Swimming career ==
Namutebi competed in the 2019 FINA World Junior Swimming Championships in the 50 metre freestyle, breaking the Ugandan national record with a time of 26.98. She placed 38th out of 103 in the qualifying heats and did not advance to the semifinals.

She represented Uganda at the 2020 Summer Olympics in Tokyo, Japan, where she competed in the 50 metre freestyle and was one of two flag bearers for Uganda in the Parade of Nations.

== Honors ==
Namutebi competed at the FINA World Junior Championship in Budapest, Hungary, in 2019, breaking the Uganda national women's 50m freestyle record.

She also participated in the Africa Junior Swimming Championship 2019 in Tunisia, and won two gold medals and two silver medals. In the Montgomery County Swim League 2019, she finished second in the 50 freestyle and among the top six in the 50 breaststroke and 50 butterfly in the All-Stars event that climaxed the league.

In 2013, she was crowned the USPA Swimmer of the Year at 8 years, and was named the USPA Uganda Female Swimmer of the Year in 2019.

Olympic Games
Preceded by Joshua Tibatemwa	Flag bearer for Uganda; Tokyo 2020 with Shadiri Bwogi	Succeeded by Charles Kagimu; Gloria Muzito
