= Flag of Uganda =

Republic of Uganda
- Use: National flag and ensign
- Proportion: 2:3
- Adopted: 9 October 1962; 64 years ago
- Design: Six equal horizontal bands, from top to bottom, of black, yellow, red, black, yellow, and red, with a white disc containing a crested crane superimposed (charged) at the centre
- Designed by: Grace Ibingira

The national flag of Uganda was adopted on 9 October 1962, the day the nation became independent from the United Kingdom. It consists of six equal horizontal bands, from top to bottom, of black, yellow, red, black, yellow, and red, with a white disc containing a crested crane superimposed (charged) at the centre. The National Flag and Armorial Ensigns Act specifies prohibited uses of the flag.

From 1914 to March 1962, the British Protectorate of Uganda flew a Blue Ensign defaced with its colonial badge, which featured a crested crane. The first flag proposed for an independent Uganda consisted of three vertical bands of green, blue, and green separated by thinner yellow bands and charged in the centre with a yellow silhouette of a crested crane. A change in government before independence led to the current flag being adopted instead.

== Design and symbolism ==
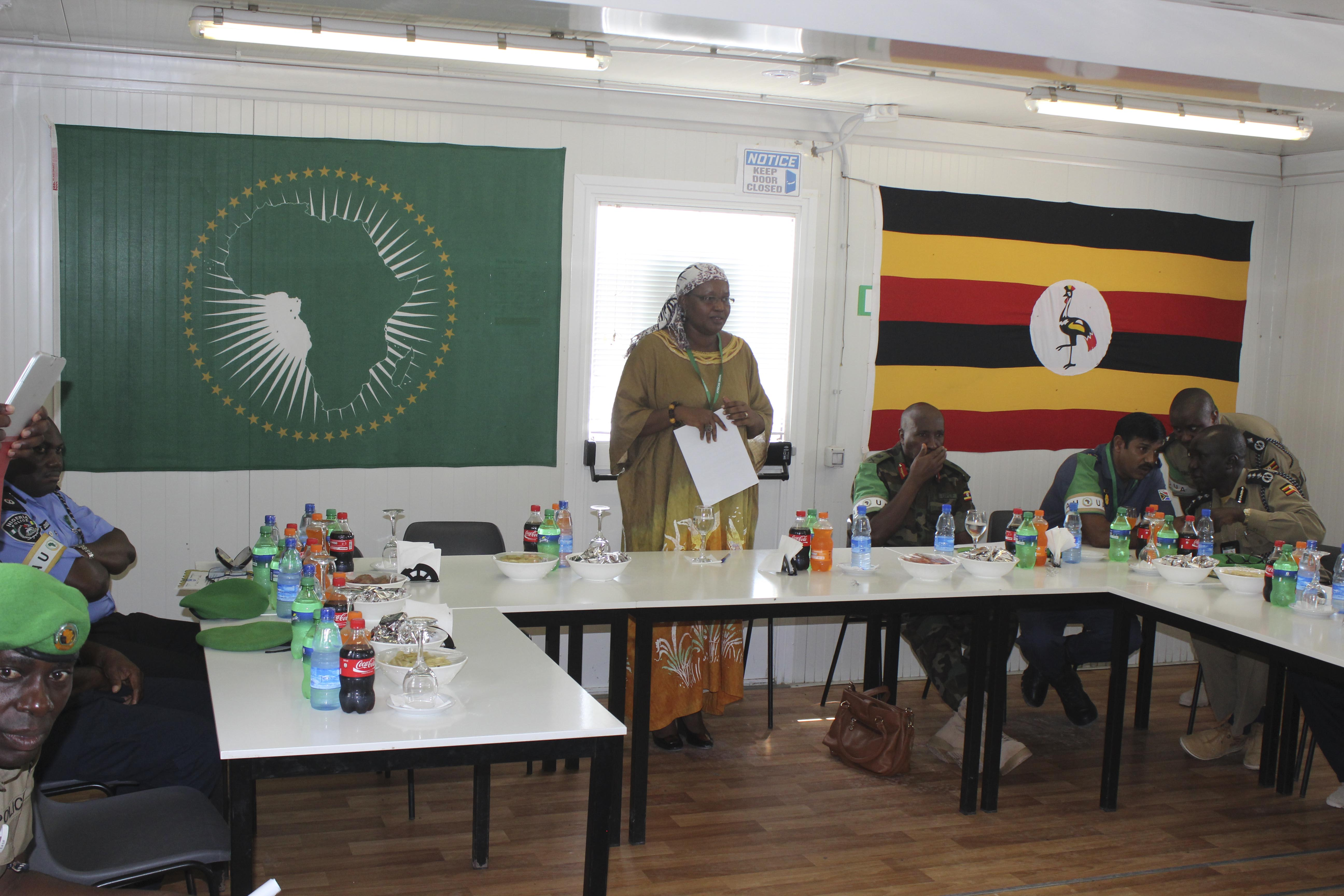
The flag of Uganda alongside the flag of the African Union at an AMISOM ceremony in 2014

Part I of Schedule 2 of Uganda's National Flag and Armorial Ensigns Act (1962) outlines the design of the national flag. It consists of, from top to bottom, six equal horizontal bands of black, yellow, red, black, yellow, and red. Charged in the centre is a white disc with a crested crane. According to American vexillologist Whitney Smith, black symbolises the Ugandan people, yellow symbolises sunshine, and red symbolises brotherhood. The crested crane is the national bird of Uganda and is a symbol of good fortune, longevity, and wealth among the indigenous Baganda (Buganda) people.

== Prohibition of use ==
Articles 3 to 5 of Uganda's National Flag and Armorial Ensigns Act establish legal punishments for the misuse of the national flag. Intentionally insulting the flag verbally, in writing, or through actions is punishable by up to two years in prison. Foreigners convicted of the crime may be deported and barred from reentering Uganda. The national flag and objects that are intentionally made to resemble it cannot be used for commercial purposes without permission from the Minister of Justice and Constitutional Affairs. A person convicted of doing so may be fined twelve currency points (USh 240,000), imprisoned for six months, or both. The minister has the ability to enact further regulations regarding the use of the flag, including the granting of licenses for the flag's commercial use.

== History ==
The British Protectorate of Uganda flew a Blue Ensign defaced with its colonial badge from 1914 to 1962. The Governor of Uganda also had a standard featuring the Union Jack charged with the badge in the centre. Although the subnational Kingdom of Buganda had a national flag prior to colonisation, the British did not want to use any existing symbols tied to a specific region and therefore chose a crested crane to be the main feature of the badge.

The crested crane remained a prominent national symbol as Ugandan independence approached in 1962. In March of that year, a committee chaired by the academic Senteza Kajubi proposed a provisional flag featuring three vertical bands of green, blue, and green separated by thinner yellow bands, with a yellow silhouette of a crested crane charged in the centre. Green represented Uganda's vegetation, blue its water bodies, and yellow its tropical weather. The design's colours reflected those of the then-ruling Democratic Party, but the provisional flag was scrapped after the Uganda People's Congress (UPC) defeated the Democratic Party in the 25 April national election. The decision is often attributed to the change in government, with the first flag of the UPC being credited as the basis of the flag adopted at independence. However, according to then Minister of Justice Grace Ibingira, the provisional flag was rejected on the recommendation of its designers, Messrs Porter Bros, because the green faded quickly in the sun and the blue was not distinctly Ugandan. The newly-formed Cabinet of Uganda consequently created a subcommittee chaired by Ibingira to select a new design. The design that would become the flag of Uganda was first approved by the subcommittee, then by the Cabinet and the British colonial authorities, and was adopted upon Uganda's independence on 9 October.

Although Ibingira is often cited as the flag's designer, other artists have claimed to be the original designer. In 2007, Semei Nyai Matia, a retired teacher from the northern Maracha District, publicly claimed to have submitted the chosen design in May 1961 and demanded USh 1.5 billion, a commercial building, and a truck as compensation for his work. Kajubi responded that, to his recollection, no reward had been offered in the original call for designs.

Flag of the Protectorate of Uganda (1914 – March 1962)

Standard of the Governor of Uganda (1914 – March 1962)

Provisional flag of Uganda (March – 9 October 1962)

First flag of the Uganda People's Congress, on which the flag of Uganda is based

== See also ==
- List of Ugandan flags
- Coat of arms of Uganda
