= Laos at the 2023 World Aquatics Championships =

- Flag of Laos
- FINA code: LAO
- National federation: Lao Swimming Federation

in Fukuoka, Japan
- Competitors: 3 in 1 sport
- Medals: Gold 0 Silver 0 Bronze 0 Total 0

World Aquatics Championships appearances
- 1973; 1975; 1978; 1982; 1986; 1991; 1994; 1998; 2001; 2003; 2005; 2007; 2009; 2011; 2013; 2015; 2017; 2019; 2022; 2023; 2024

Laos is set to compete at the 2023 World Aquatics Championships in Fukuoka, Japan from 14 to 30 July.

== Swimming ==
Laos entered 3 swimmers.

Men

Athlete	Event	Heat		Semifinal		Final	
Athlete	Event	Time	Rank	Time	Rank	Time	Rank
Santisouk Inthavong	50 metre freestyle	25.56	92	Did not advance			
Santisouk Inthavong	100 metre freestyle	58.25	107	Did not advance			
Slava Sihanouvong	50 metre breaststroke	32.93	54	Did not advance			
Slava Sihanouvong	50 metre butterfly	29.13	81	Did not advance			

Women

Athlete	Event	Heat		Semifinal		Final	
Athlete	Event	Time	Rank	Time	Rank	Time	Rank
Makelyta Singsombath	100 metre freestyle	1:01.90	58	Did not advance			
Makelyta Singsombath	50 metre breaststroke	36.83	44	Did not advance			
