= Laos at the 2017 World Aquatics Championships =

- Flag of Laos
- FINA code: LAO
- National federation: Laos Swimming Federation

in Budapest, Hungary
- Competitors: 3 in 1 sport
- Medals: Gold 0 Silver 0 Bronze 0 Total 0

World Aquatics Championships appearances
- 1973; 1975; 1978; 1982; 1986; 1991; 1994; 1998; 2001; 2003; 2005; 2007; 2009; 2011; 2013; 2015; 2017; 2019; 2022; 2023; 2024

Laos competed at the 2017 World Aquatics Championships in Budapest, Hungary from 14 July to 30 July.

== Swimming ==
Laos has received a Universality invitation from FINA to send three swimmers (two men and one woman) to the World Championships.

Athlete	Event	Heat		Semifinal		Final	
Athlete	Event	Time	Rank	Time	Rank	Time	Rank
Santisouk Inthavong	Men's 50 m freestyle	26.36	105	did not advance			
Santisouk Inthavong	Men's 50 m backstroke	31.96	51	did not advance			
Slava Sihanouvong	Men's 50 m breaststroke	32.60	69	did not advance			
Slava Sihanouvong	Men's 50 m butterfly	29.81	77	did not advance			
Siri Arun Budcharern	Women's 50 m freestyle	31.86	78	did not advance			
Siri Arun Budcharern	Women's 50 m breaststroke	40.57	48	did not advance			
