= Laos at the 2019 World Aquatics Championships =

- Flag of Laos
- World Aquatics code: LAO
- National federation: Laos Swimming Federation

World Aquatics Championships appearances
- 1973; 1975; 1978; 1982; 1986; 1991; 1994; 1998; 2001; 2003; 2005; 2007; 2009; 2011; 2013; 2015; 2017; 2019; 2022; 2023; 2024; 2025

Laos competed at the 2019 World Aquatics Championships in Gwangju, South Korea from 12 to 28 July.

== Swimming ==
Laos entered three swimmers.

Men

| Athlete | Event | Heat | | Semifinal | | Final | |
| Athlete | Event | Time | Rank | Time | Rank | Time | Rank |
|---|---|---|---|---|---|---|---|
| Santisouk Inthavong | 50 m freestyle | 25.79 | 109 | did not advance | | | |
| Santisouk Inthavong | 50 m backstroke | 30.75 | 67 | did not advance | | | |
| Slava Sihanouvong | 50 m breaststroke | 32.11 | 64 | did not advance | | | |
| Slava Sihanouvong | 50 m butterfly | 30.40 | 88 | did not advance | | | |

Women

| Athlete | Event | Heat | | Semifinal | | Final | |
| Athlete | Event | Time | Rank | Time | Rank | Time | Rank |
|---|---|---|---|---|---|---|---|
| Siri Arun Budcharern | 50 m freestyle | 31.32 | 88 | did not advance | | | |
| Siri Arun Budcharern | 50 m breaststroke | 40.72 | 48 | did not advance | | | |
