= Laos at the 2024 World Aquatics Championships =

- Flag of Laos
- FINA code: LAO
- National federation: Lao Swimming Federation

in Doha, Qatar
- Competitors: 3 in 1 sport
- Medals: Gold 0 Silver 0 Bronze 0 Total 0

World Aquatics Championships appearances
- 1973; 1975; 1978; 1982; 1986; 1991; 1994; 1998; 2001; 2003; 2005; 2007; 2009; 2011; 2013; 2015; 2017; 2019; 2022; 2023; 2024

Laos competed at the 2024 World Aquatics Championships in Doha, Qatar from 2 to 18 February.

== Competitors ==
The following is the list of competitors in the Championships.

Sport	Men	Women	Total
Swimming	1	2	3
Total	1	2	3

== Swimming ==
Laos entered 3 swimmers.

Men

Athlete	Event	Heat		Semifinal		Final	
Athlete	Event	Time	Rank	Time	Rank	Time	Rank
Slava Sihanouvong	50 metre freestyle	26.48	92	Did not advance			
Slava Sihanouvong	50 metre butterfly	29.55	60	Did not advance			

Women

Athlete	Event	Heat		Semifinal		Final	
Athlete	Event	Time	Rank	Time	Rank	Time	Rank
Ariana Dirkzwager	100 metre freestyle	59.16	38	Did not advance			
Ariana Dirkzwager	200 metre backstroke	2:24.69	29	Did not advance			
Makelyta Singsombath	50 metre freestyle	29.77	84	Did not advance			
Makelyta Singsombath	100 metre breaststroke	1:23.98	50	Did not advance			
