= List of flags of Laos =

The following is a flag list of Laos.

== National ==
=== Present ===
| Flag | Date | Use | Description |
|---|---|---|---|
| | 1975–present | National flag and ensign | Three horizontal stripes, with the middle stripe in blue being twice the height of the top and bottom red stripes. In the middle is a white disc, the diameter of the disc is 4/5 the height of the blue stripe. Ratio is 2:3. |

=== Historical flags ===
| Flag | Date | Use | Description |
|---|---|---|---|
| | 1893–1945; 1946–1953 | Protectorate flag of Kingdom of Laos | Ratio is 2:3. Influences: |
| | Oct. 1945 – Apr. 1946 | State flag and civil ensign of Kingdom of Laos | Three horizontal stripes, with the middle stripe in blue being twice the height of the top and bottom red stripes. In the middle is a white disc, the diameter of the disc is 4/5 the height of the blue stripe. Ratio is 2:3. Influences: |
| | 1953–1975 | State flag and civil ensign of Kingdom of Laos | Ratio is 2:3. Influences: |

== Royal standards ==
| Flag | Date | Use | Description |
|---|---|---|---|
| | 1893–1947 | Royal standard of the Kingdom of Luang Phrabang | Ratio is 2:3. Influences: |
| | 1949–1975 | Royal standard of the Kingdom of Laos | Ratio is 2:3. Influences: |
| | 1949–1975 | Personal standard of the kings | Ratio is 1:1. Influences: |

== Military flags ==
| Flag | Date | Use | Description |
|---|---|---|---|
| | | Flag of the Lao People's Armed Forces | National flag of Laos defaced with Lao inscriptions in the upper stripe: "Lao People's Armed Forces promotes the nature of revolutionary traditions" (ກອງທັບປະຊາຊົນລາວ ເສີມຂະຫຍາຍທາດແທ້ມູນເຊື້ອປະຕິວັດ). |
| | 2018– | Flag of the Lao People's Navy | White and dark blue flag defaced with the emblem of the Lao People's Armed Forces at the centre, and "1.20" inscribed in the top hoist corner. Influences: |
| | 2018– | Flag of the Lao People's Liberation Army Air Force | Light blue and dark green flag defaced with the emblem of the Lao People's Armed Forces at the centre, and "1.20" inscribed in the top hoist corner. Influences: |

== Subjects ==
Kingdoms

Viangchan (1707–1828)

Champasak (1713–1947)

Luang Phrabang (1707–1893)

Laos (1893–1945, 1946–1953)

Luang Phrabang (1945)

Flags of ethnic minorities and minority organisations

Hmong

Lahu

Akha

Khmer Loeu

== Organizations ==
- Lao Front for National Construction
Lao Front for National Construction (1945–present)

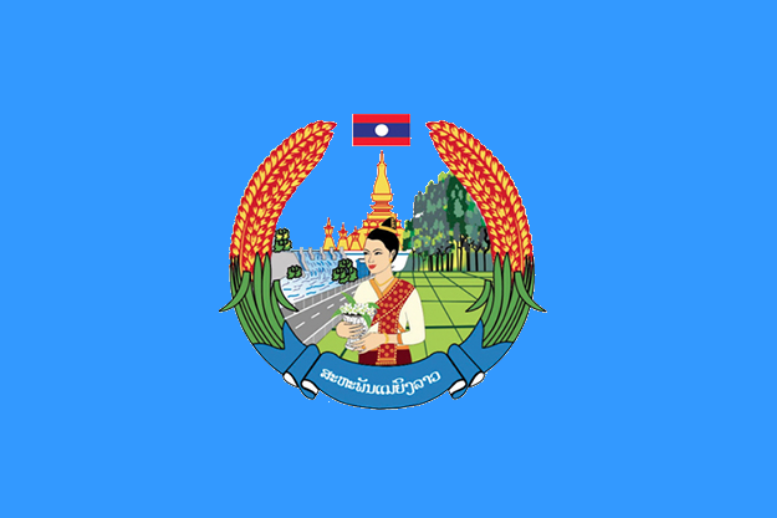
Lao Women's Union (1991–present)

Lao Buddhist Association (1920s–present)

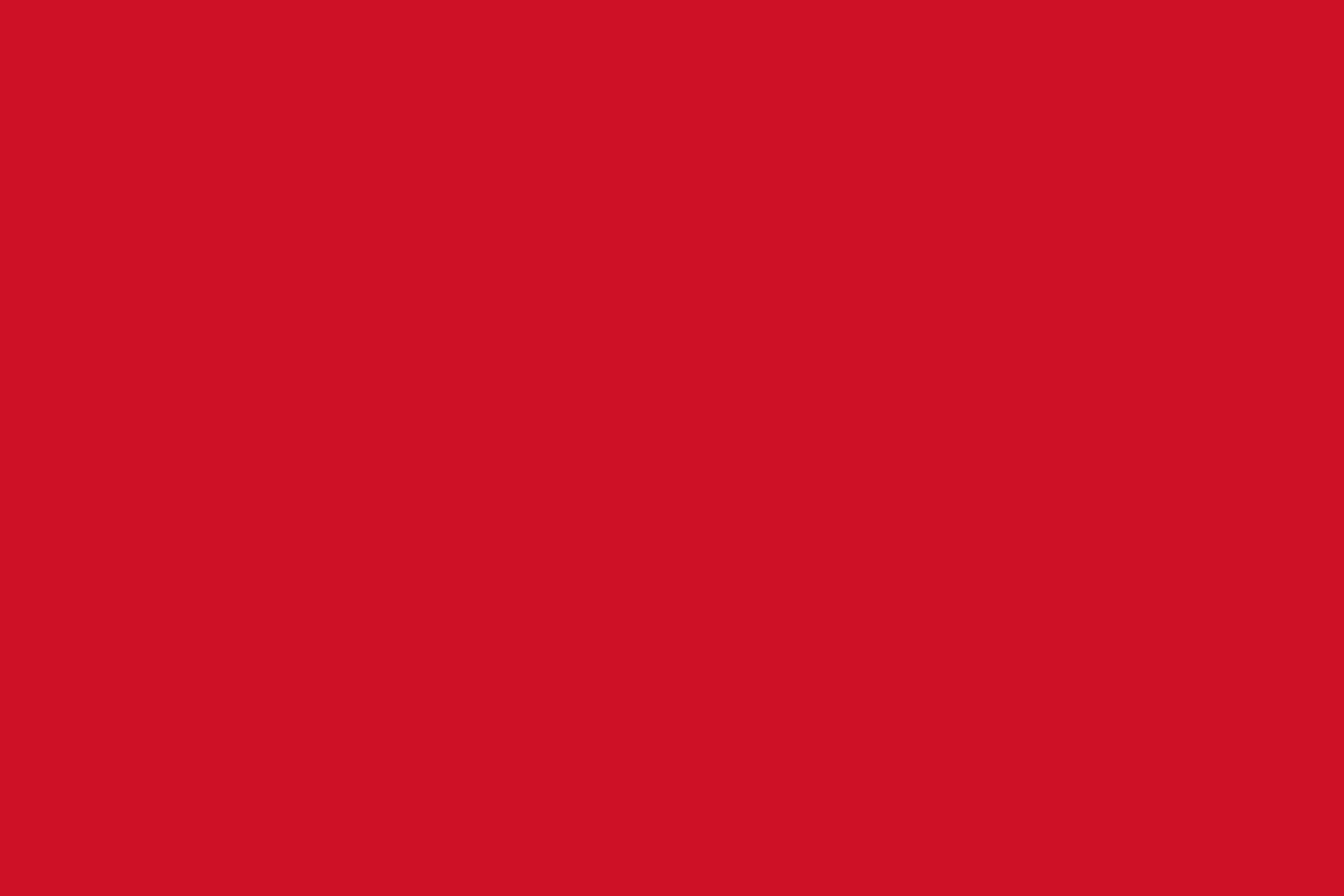
Pathet Lao Armes Forces (1950–1975)
- Lao People's Revolutionary Party
Lao People's Revolutionary Party (1955–present)

Lao People's Revolutionary Youth Union (1955–present)
- Lao Neutralist Movement
Forces Armées Neutralistes (1960–1975)

Laotian Royalist Movement (1975–present)

== Under foreign domination ==
Khmer Empire

Laotian countries under the Khmer empire (802–1431)

Burmese Empire

Lan Xang under the 2nd Burmese Empire (1583–1591)

Kingdom of Vientiane under the 3rd Burmese Empire (1765–1779)

Chinese (2 AD – 1885)

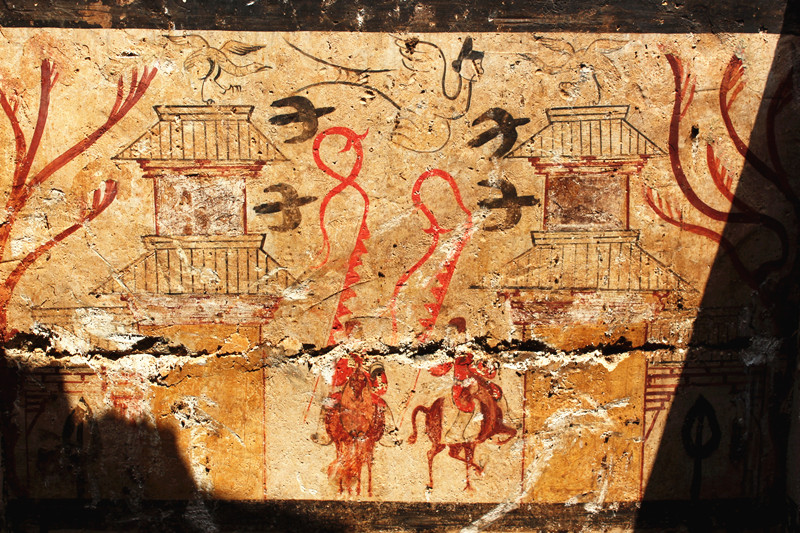
Han dynasty 2–220

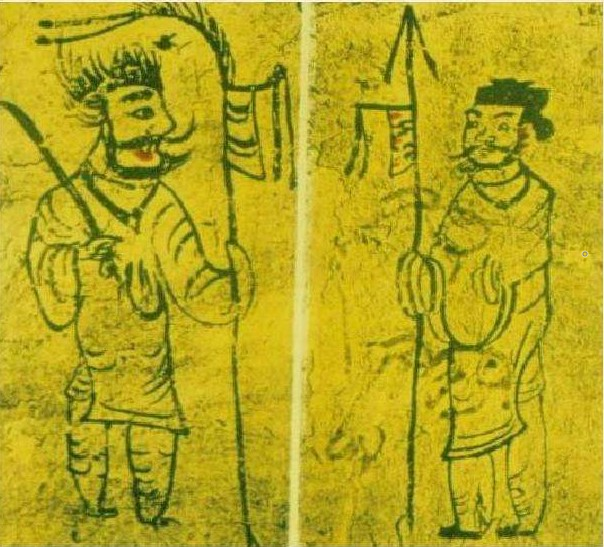
Han dynasty (2–220)

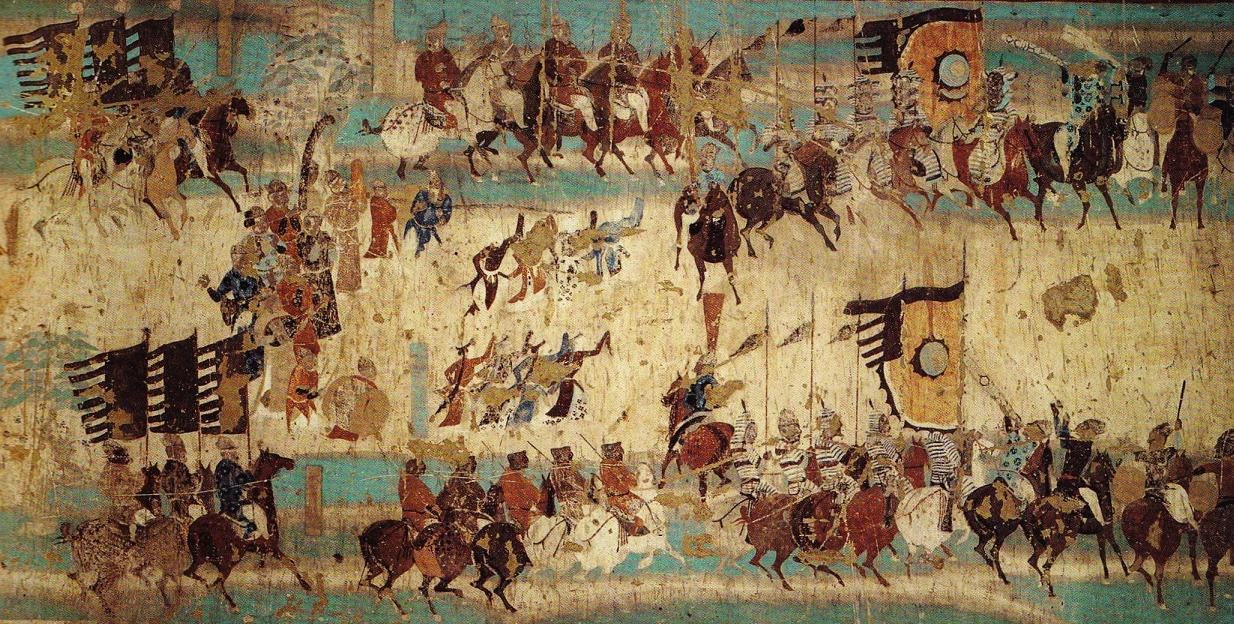
Tang dynasty (669–907)

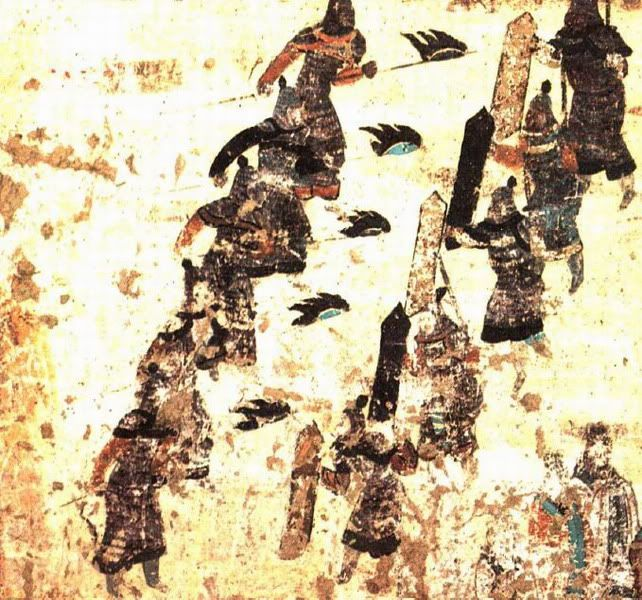
Tang dynasty (669–907)

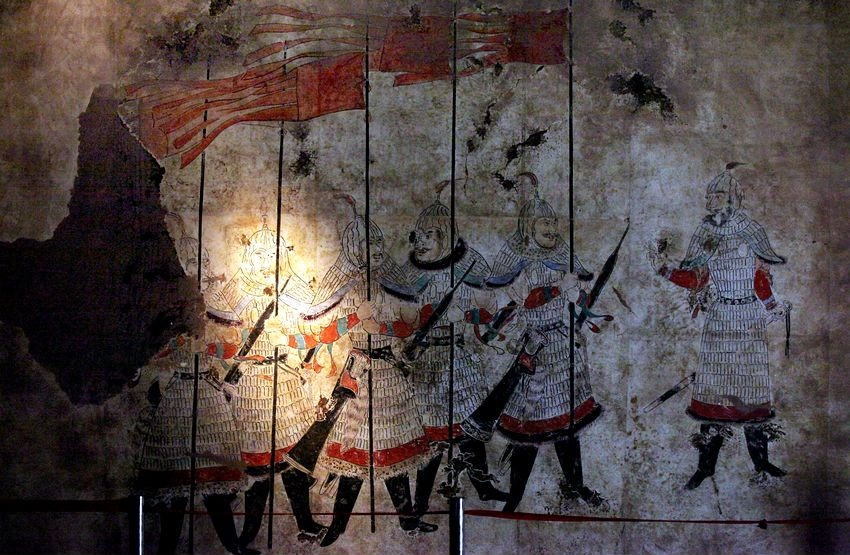
Tang dynasty (669–907)

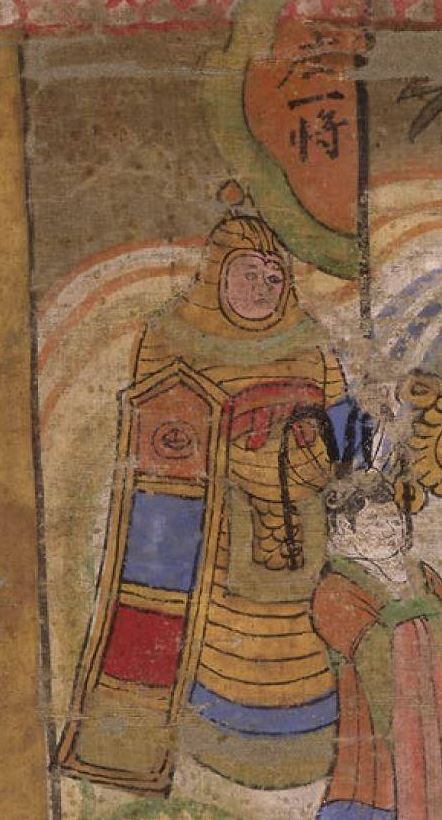
Tang dynasty (669–907)

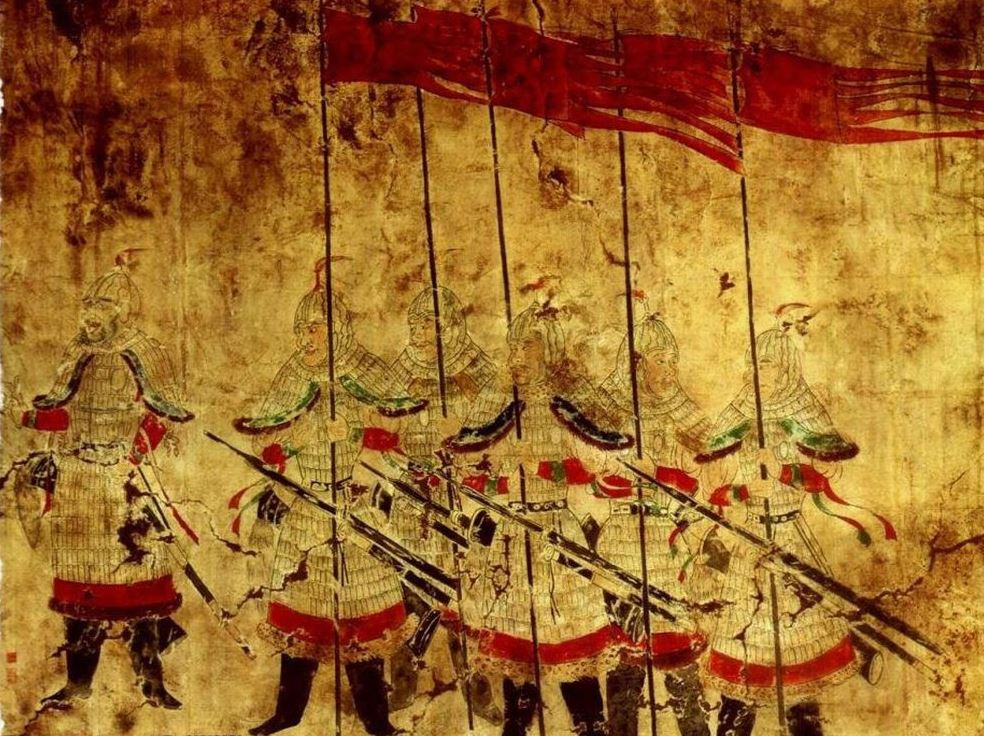
Tang dynasty (669–907)

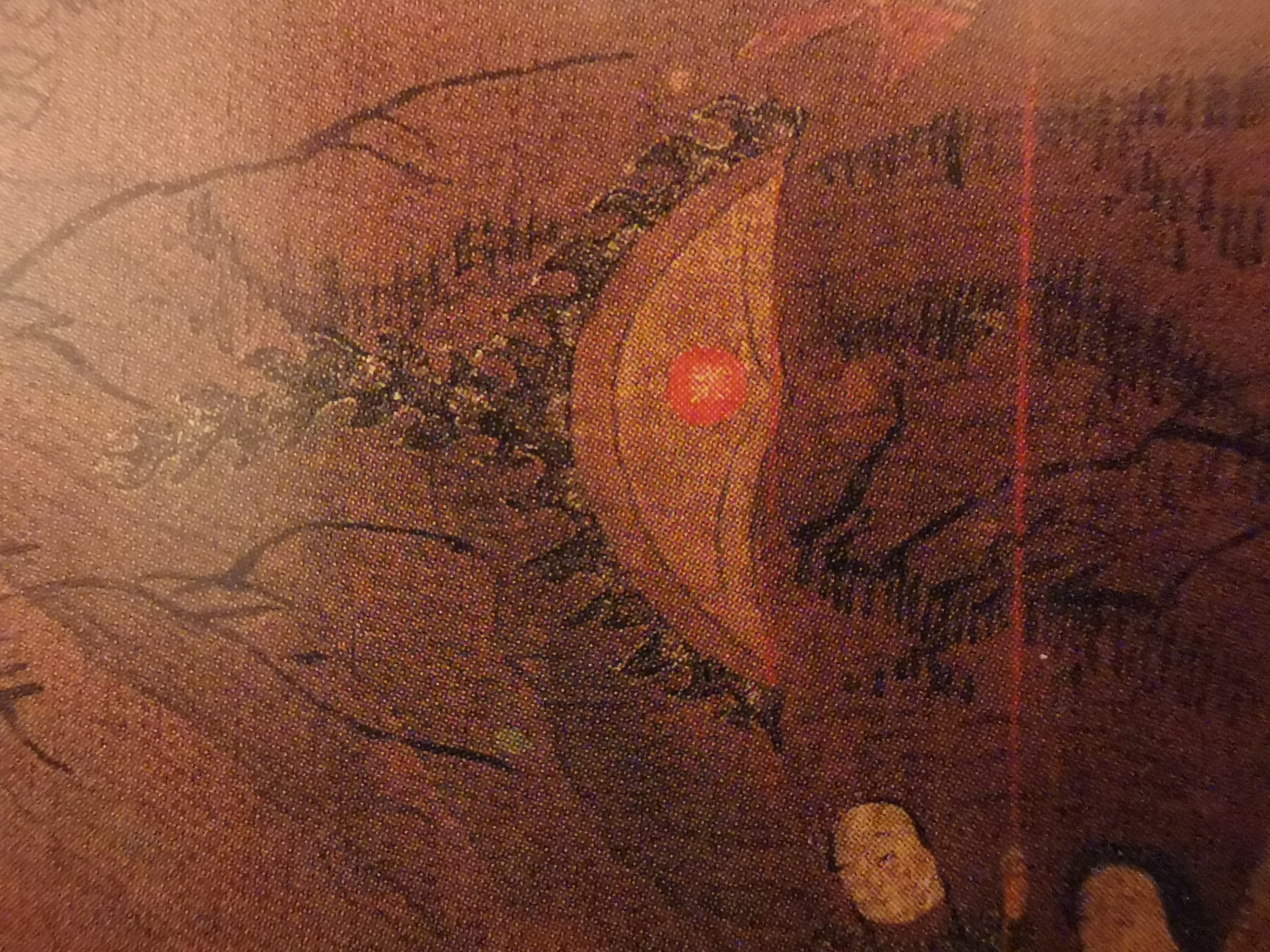
Yuan dynasty (1294–1368)

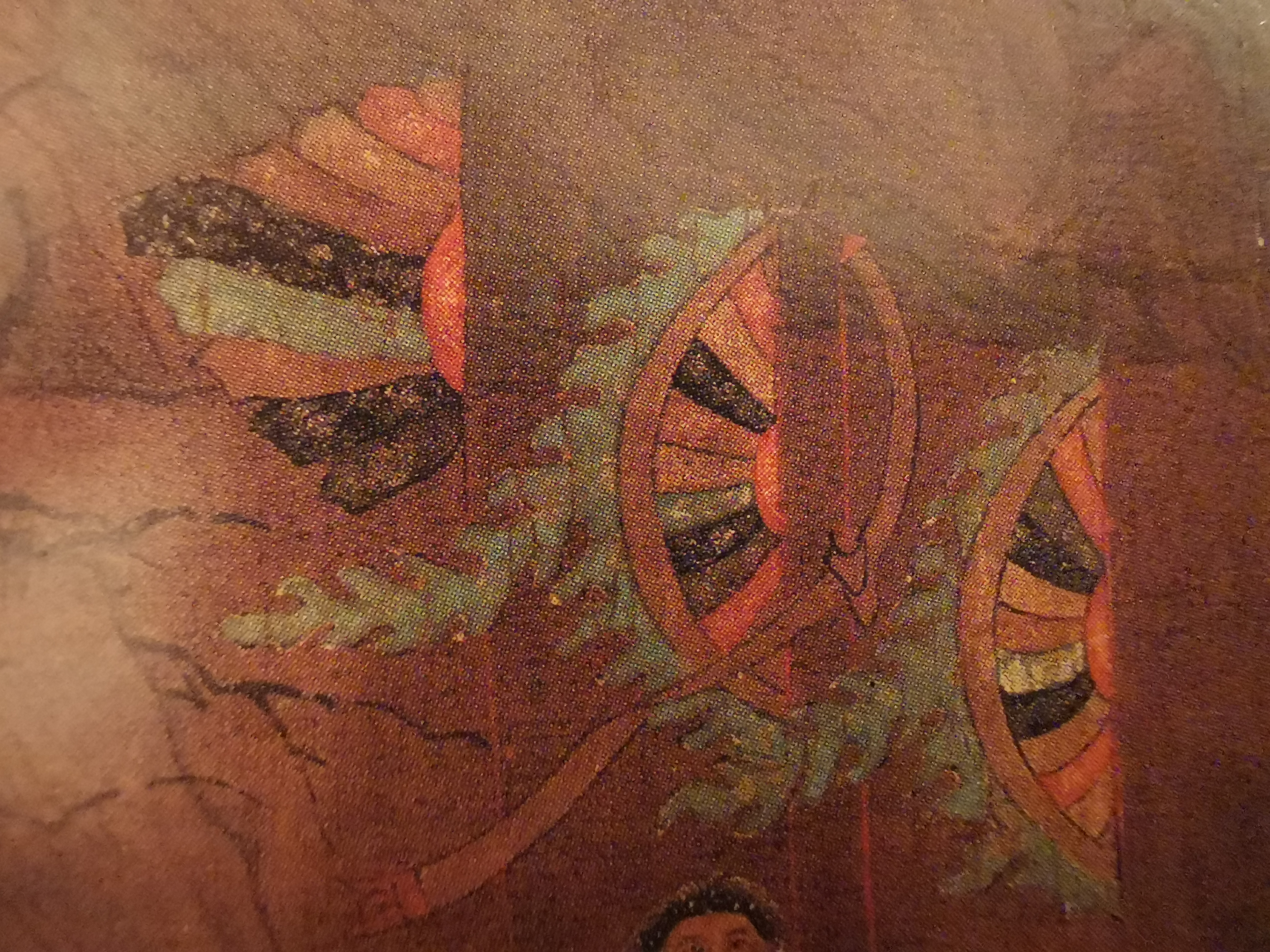
Yuan dynasty (1294–1368)

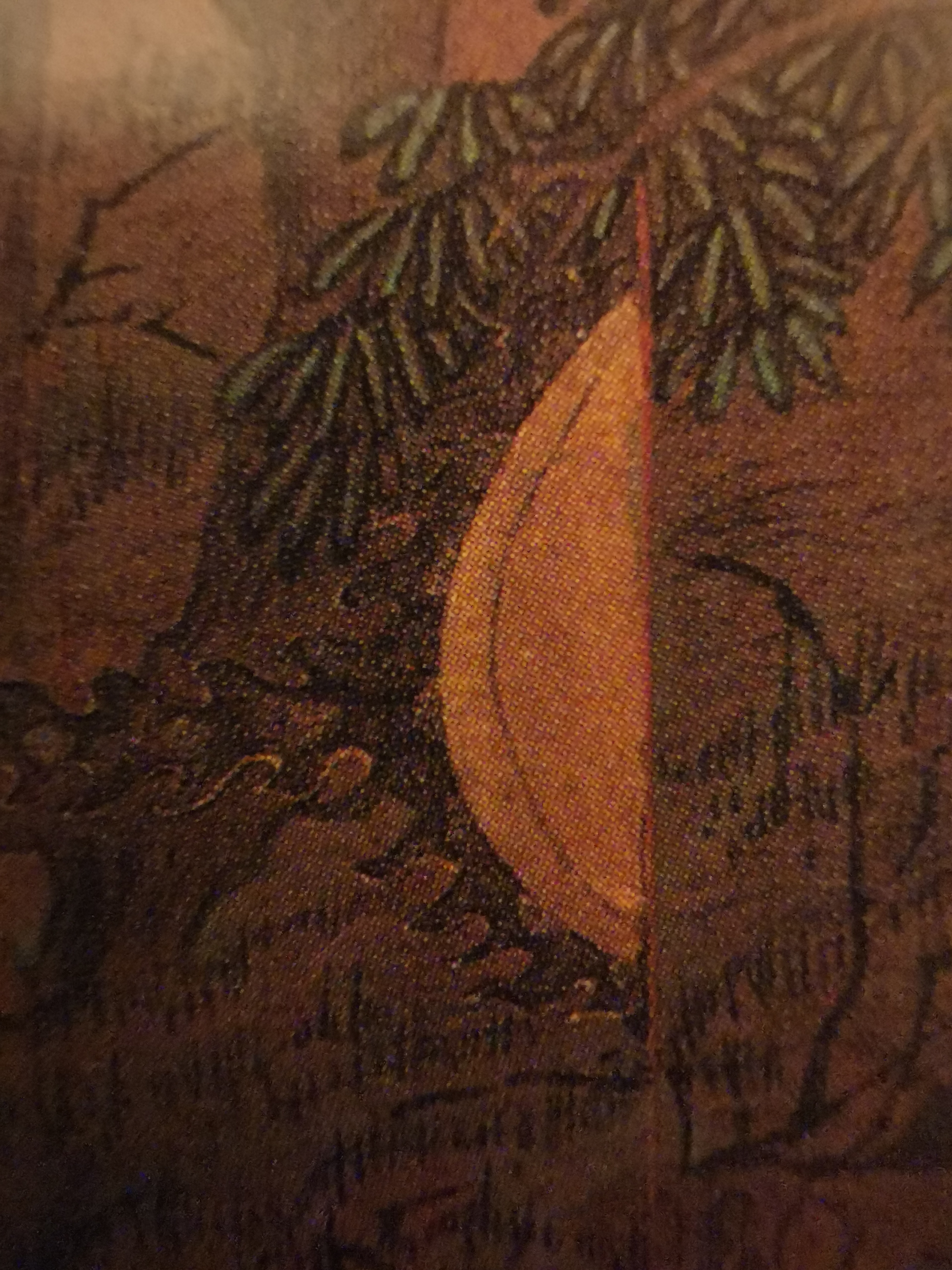
Yuan dynasty (1294–1368)

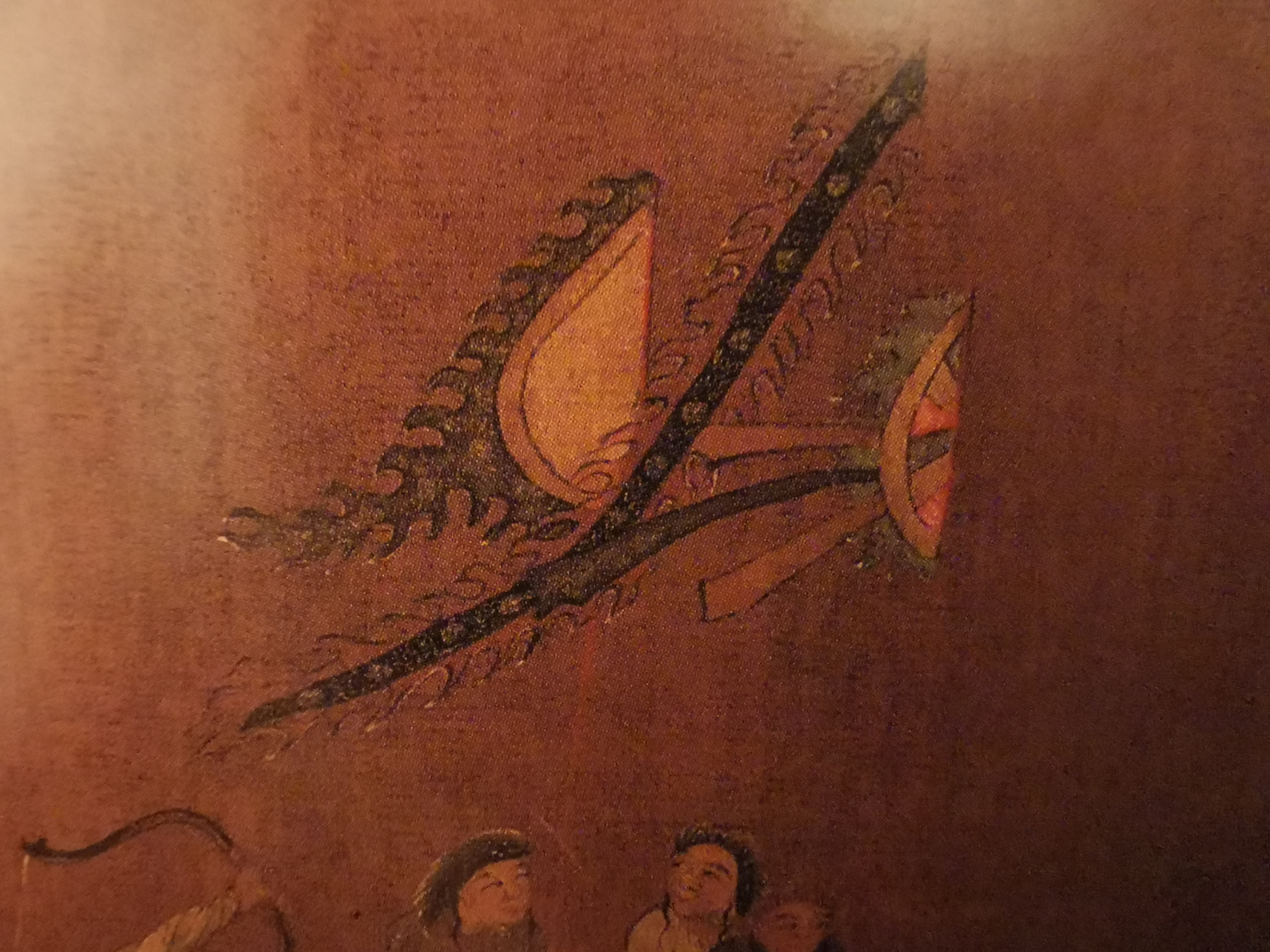
Yuan dynasty (1294–1368)

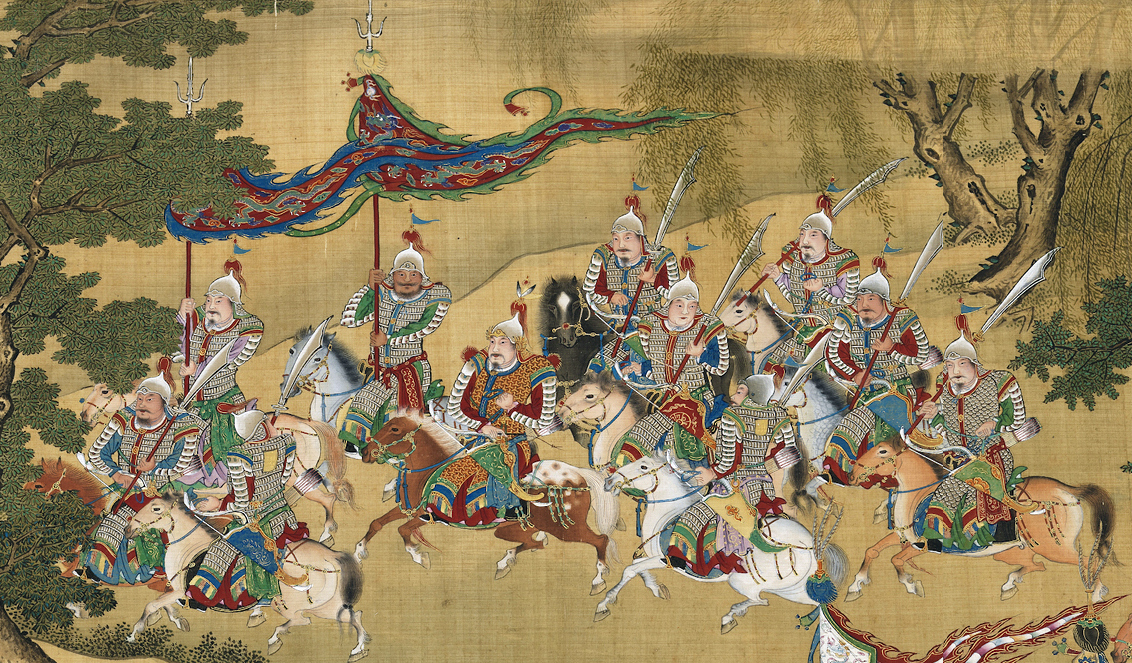
Ming dynasty (1368–1644)

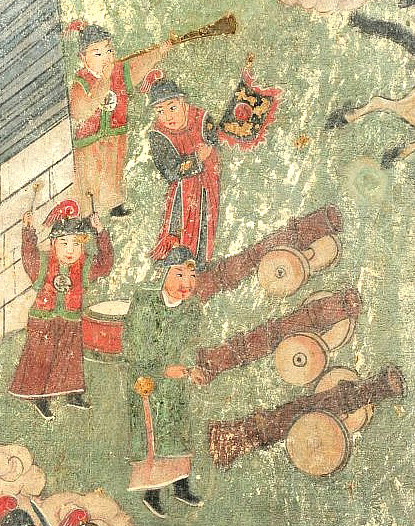
Ming dynasty (1368–1644)

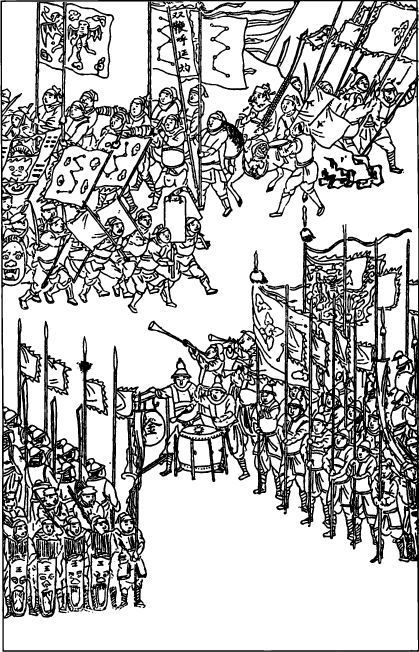
Ming dynasty (1368–1644)

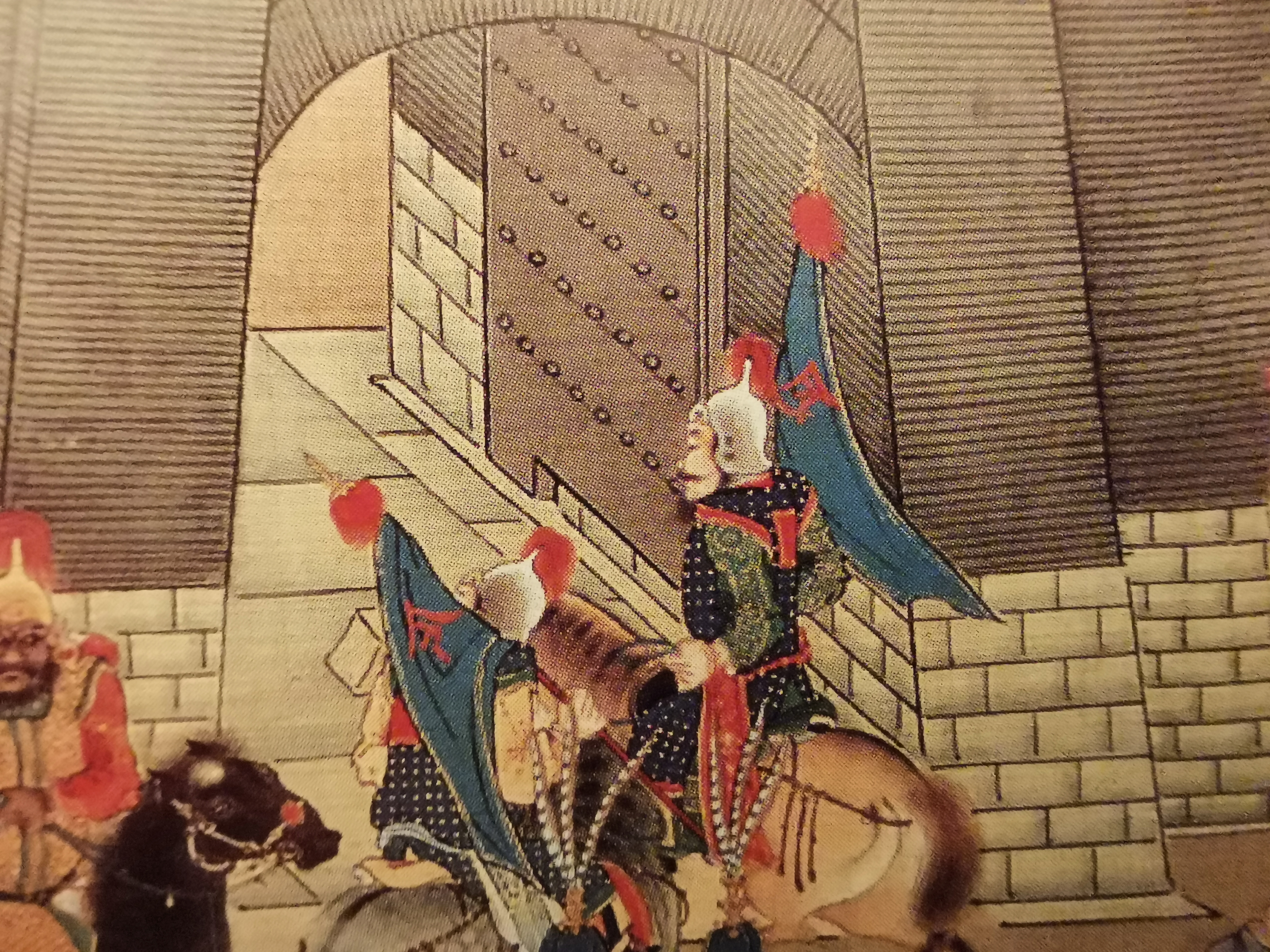
Ming dynasty (1368–1644)

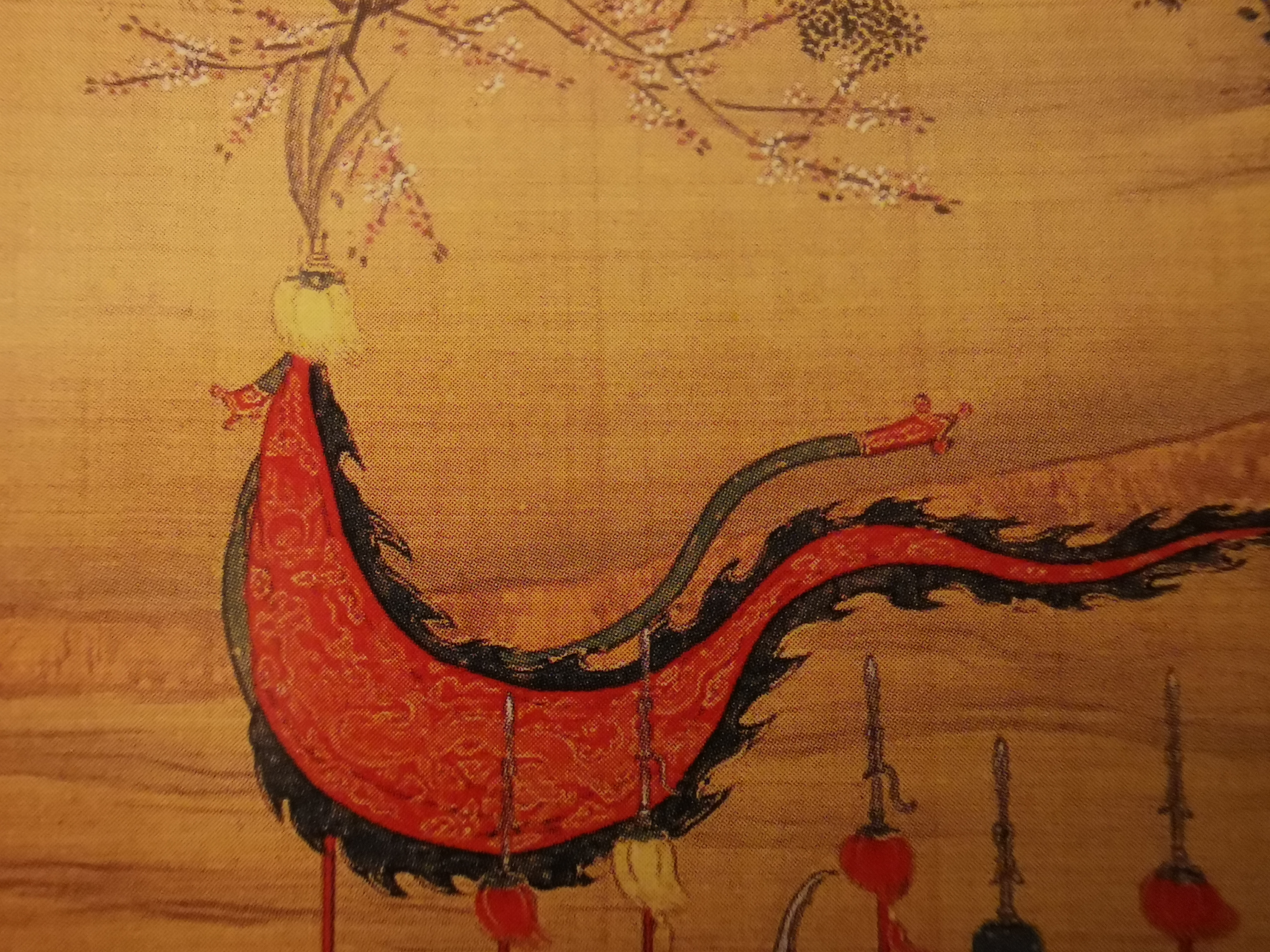
Ming dynasty (1368–1644)

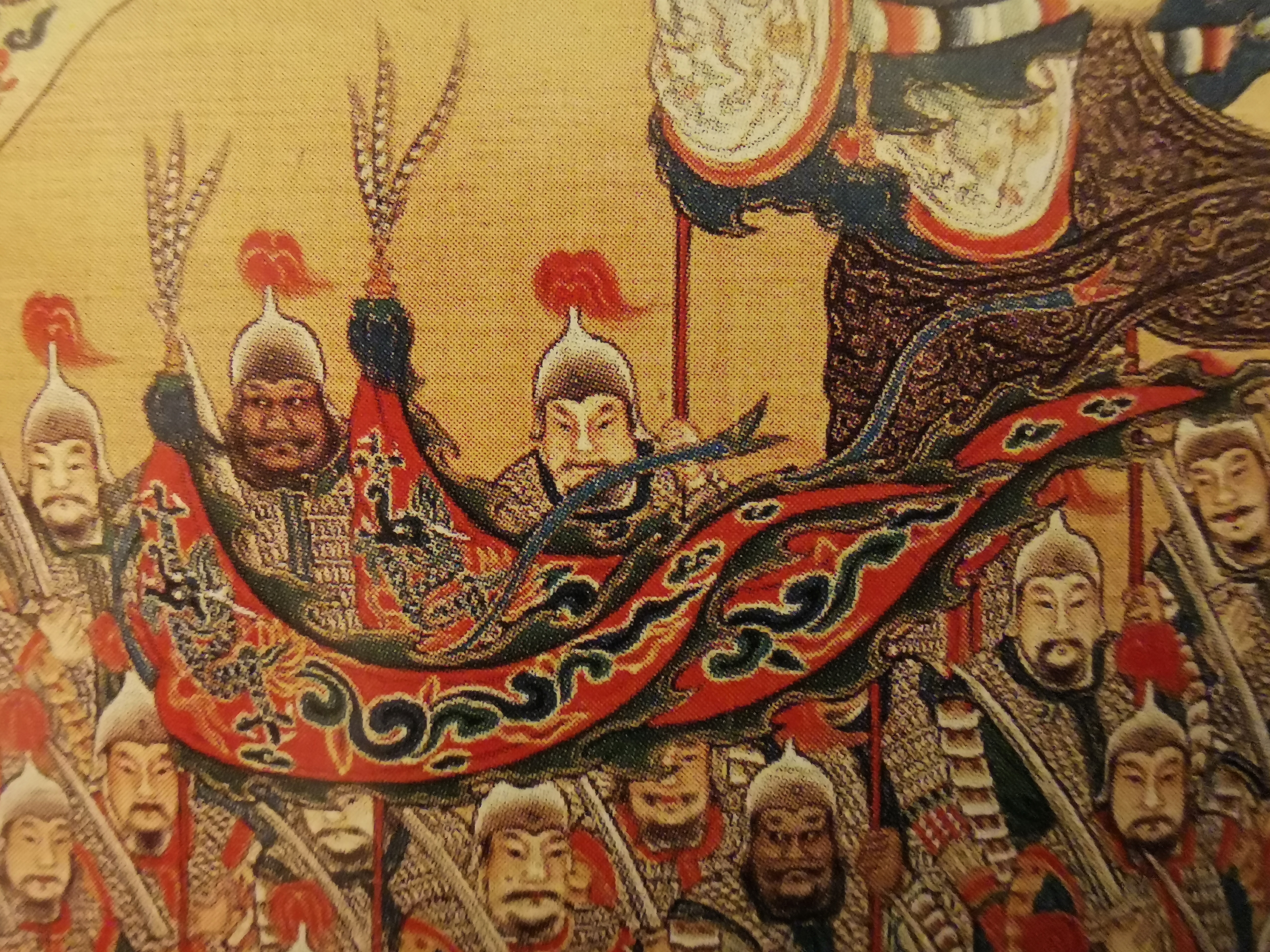
Ming dynasty (1368–1644)

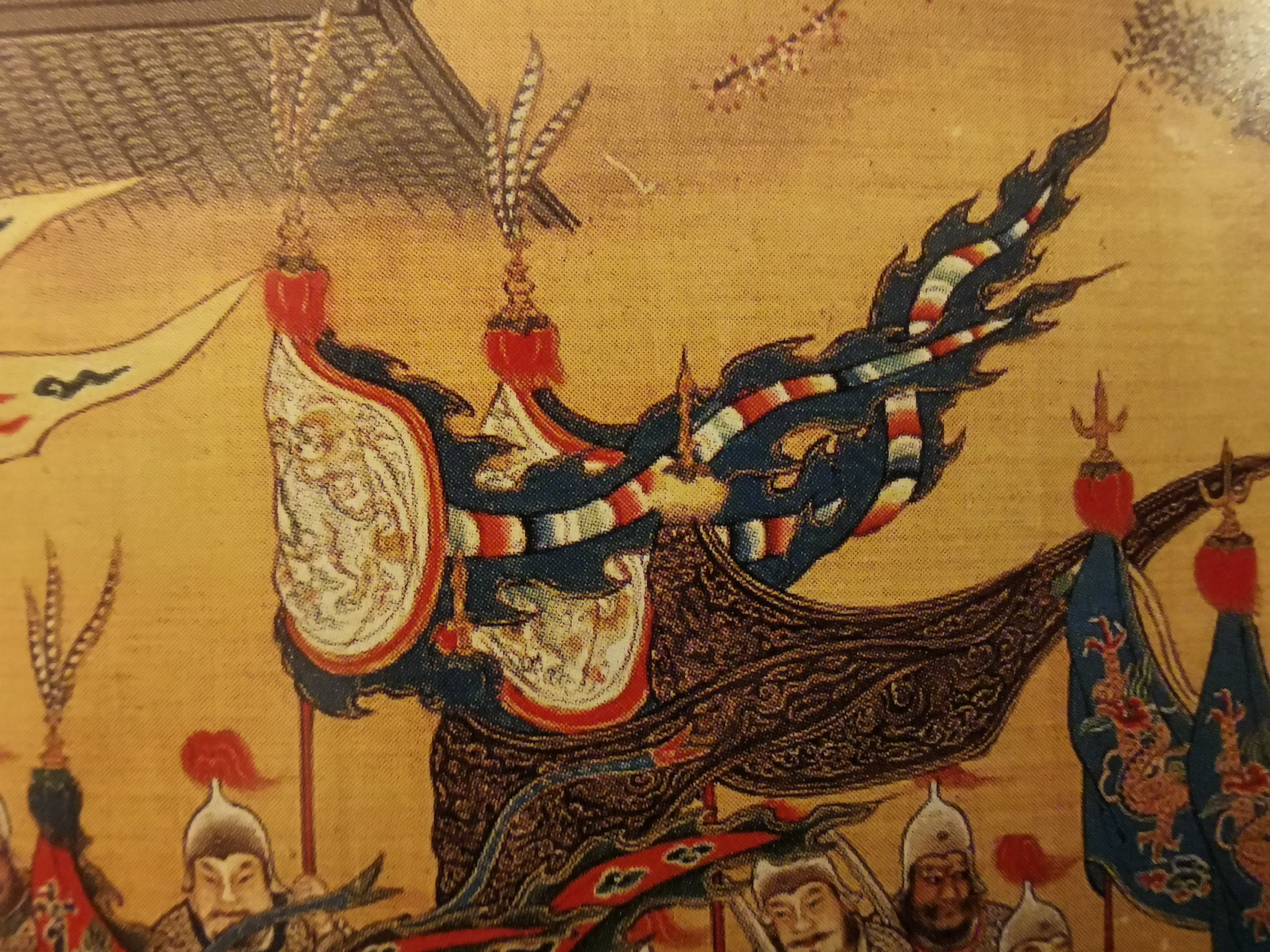
Ming dynasty (1368–1644)

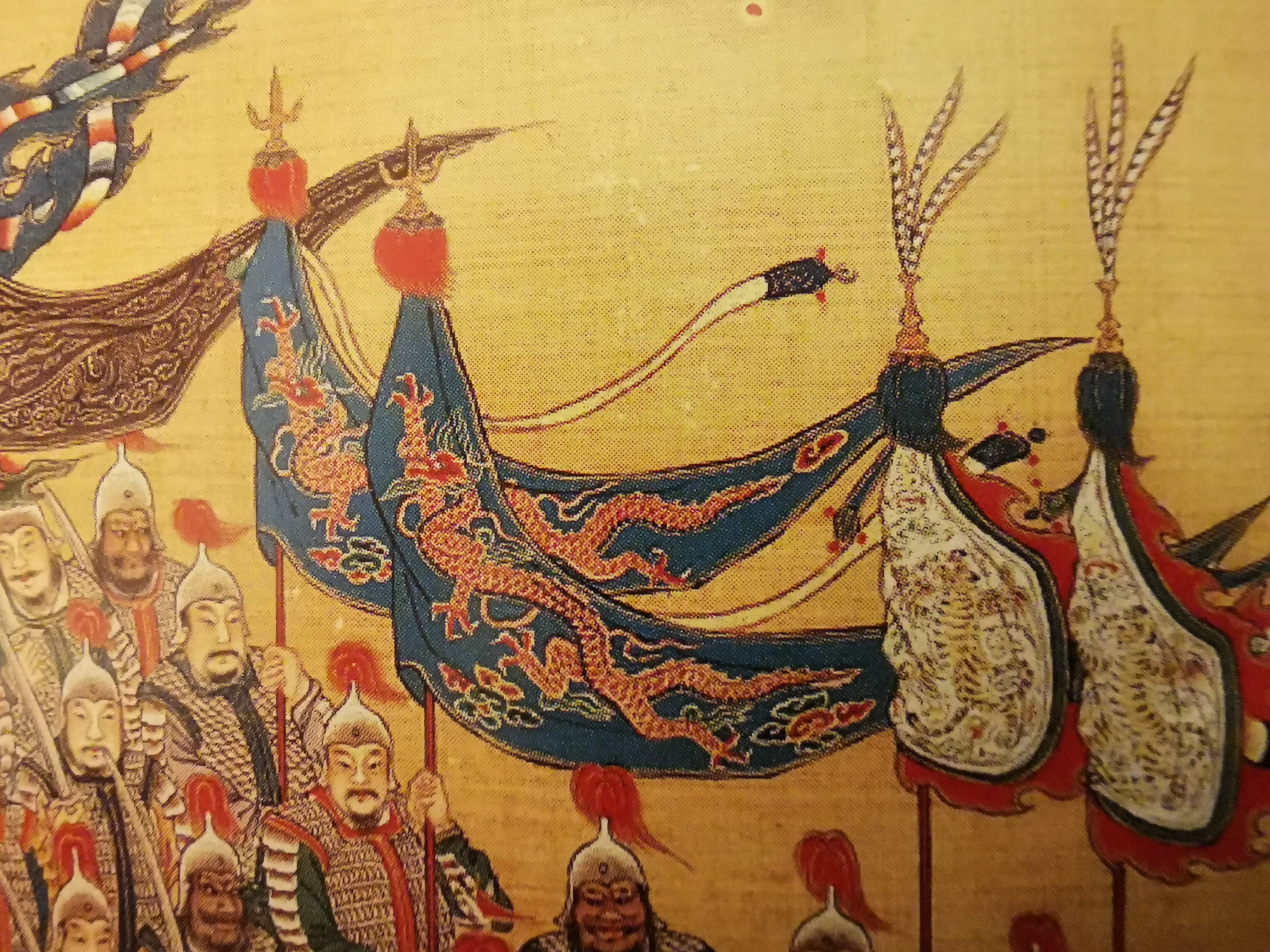
Ming dynasty (1368–1644)

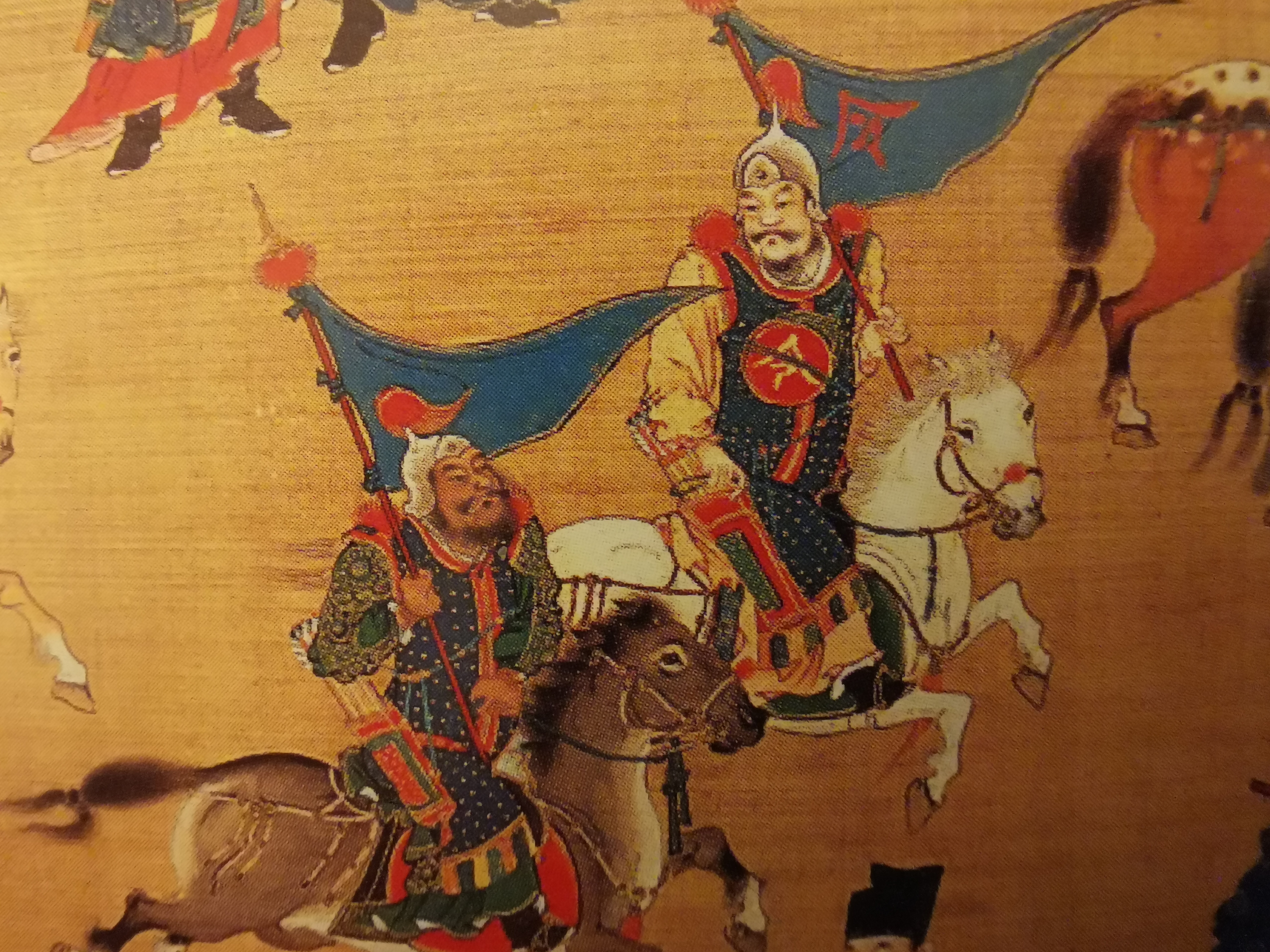
Ming dynasty (1368–1644)

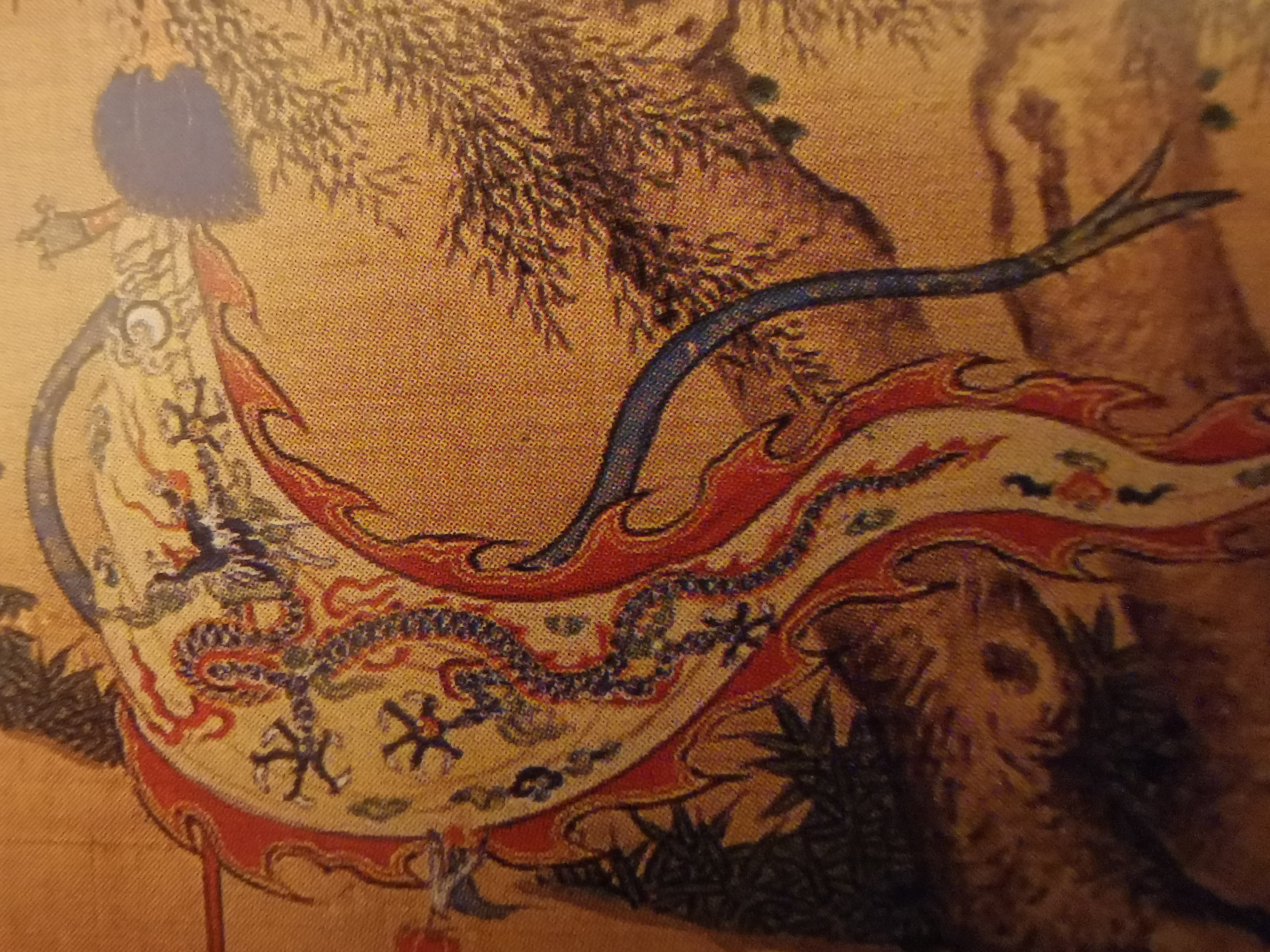
Ming dynasty (1368–1644)

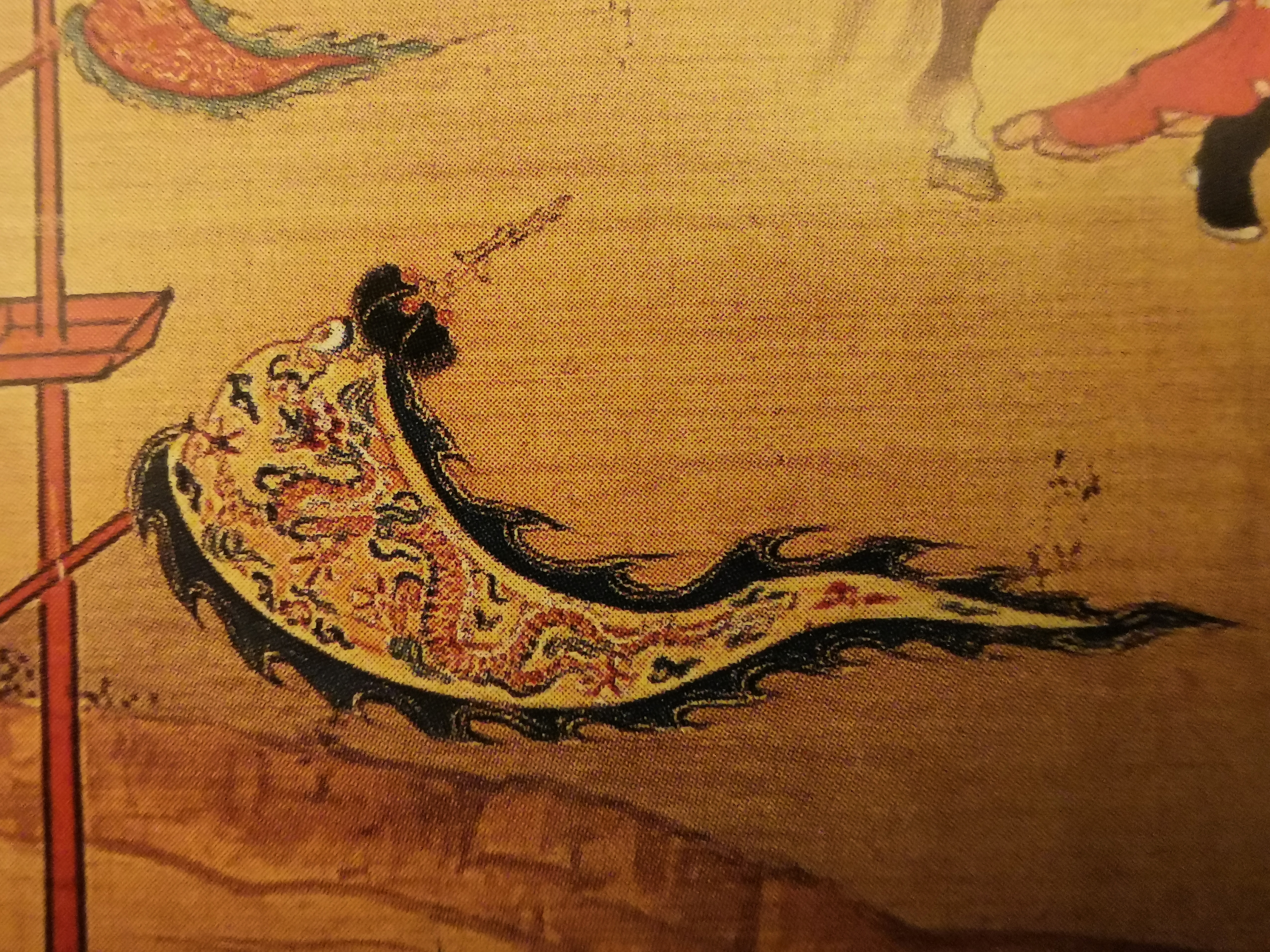
Ming dynasty (1368–1644)

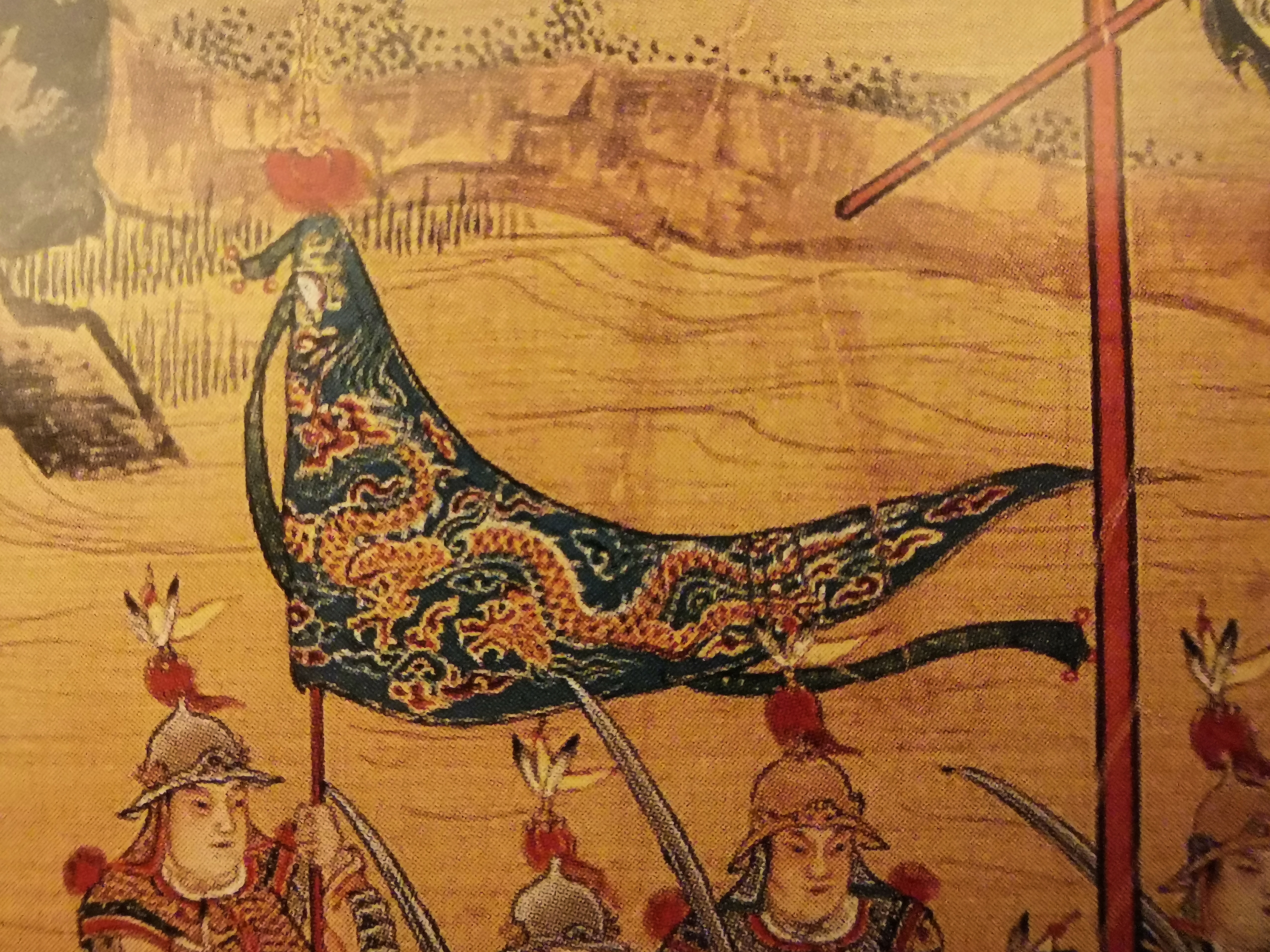
Ming dynasty (1368–1644)

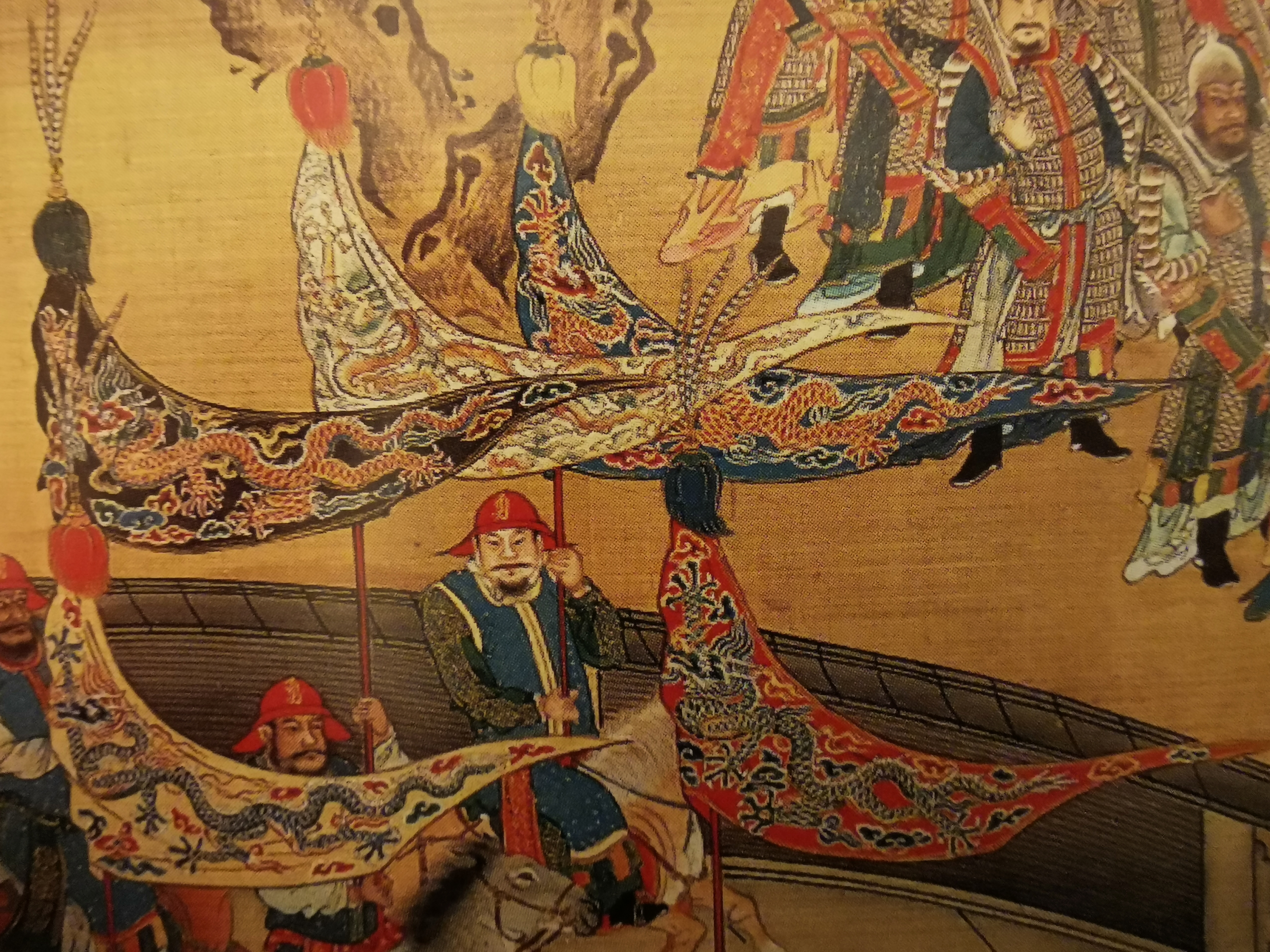
Ming dynasty (1368–1644)

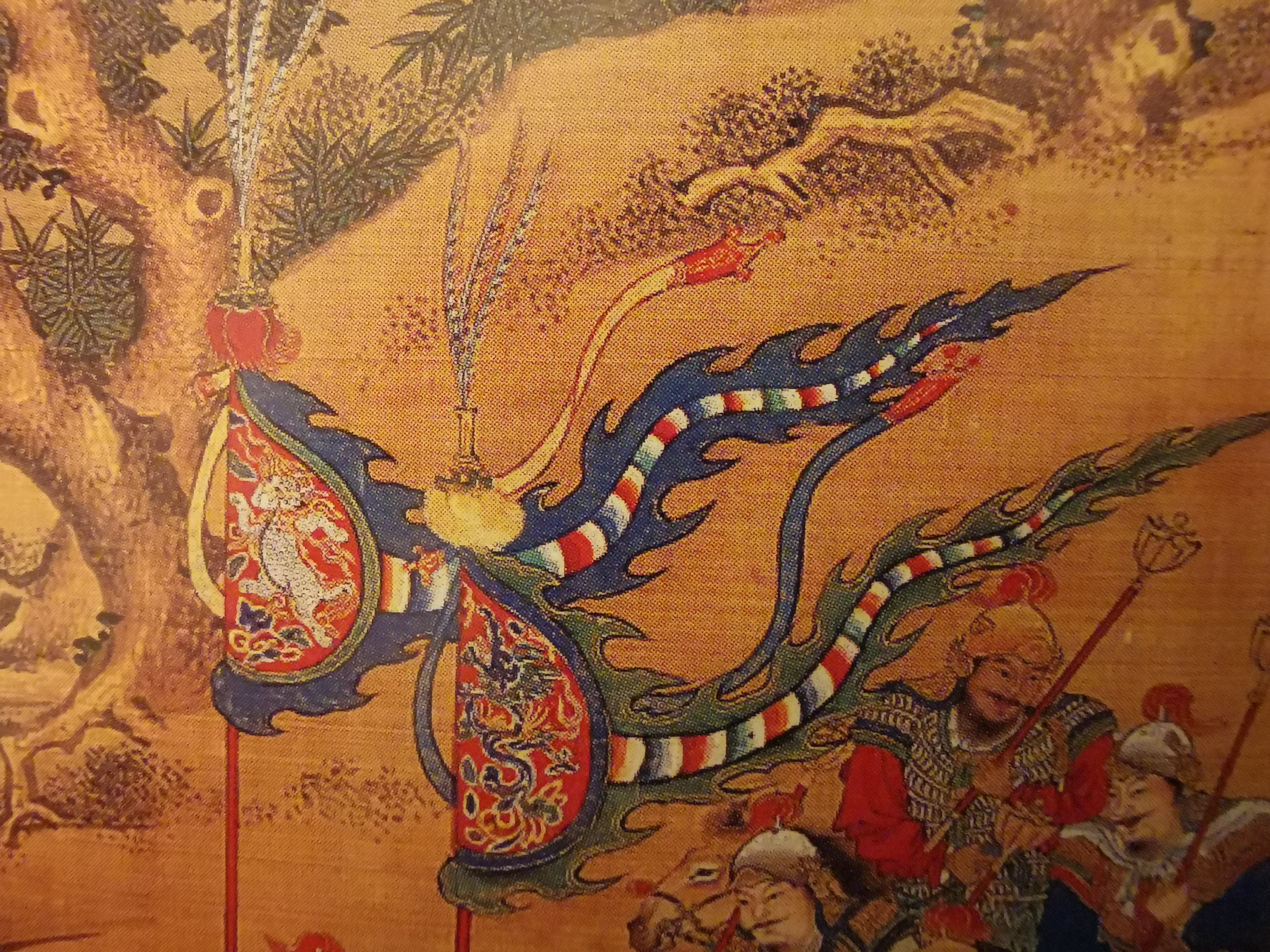
Ming dynasty (1368–1644)

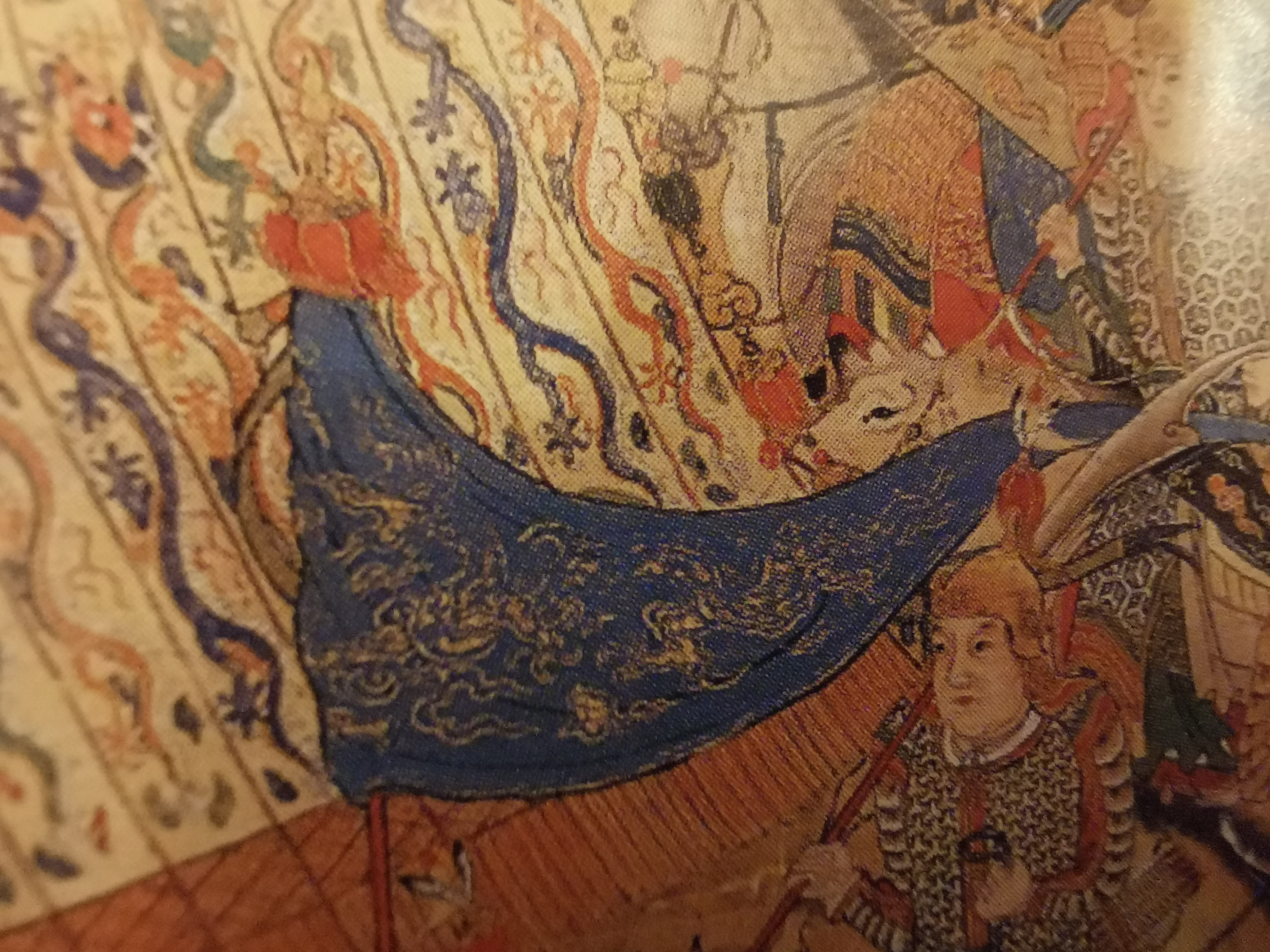
Ming dynasty (1368–1644)

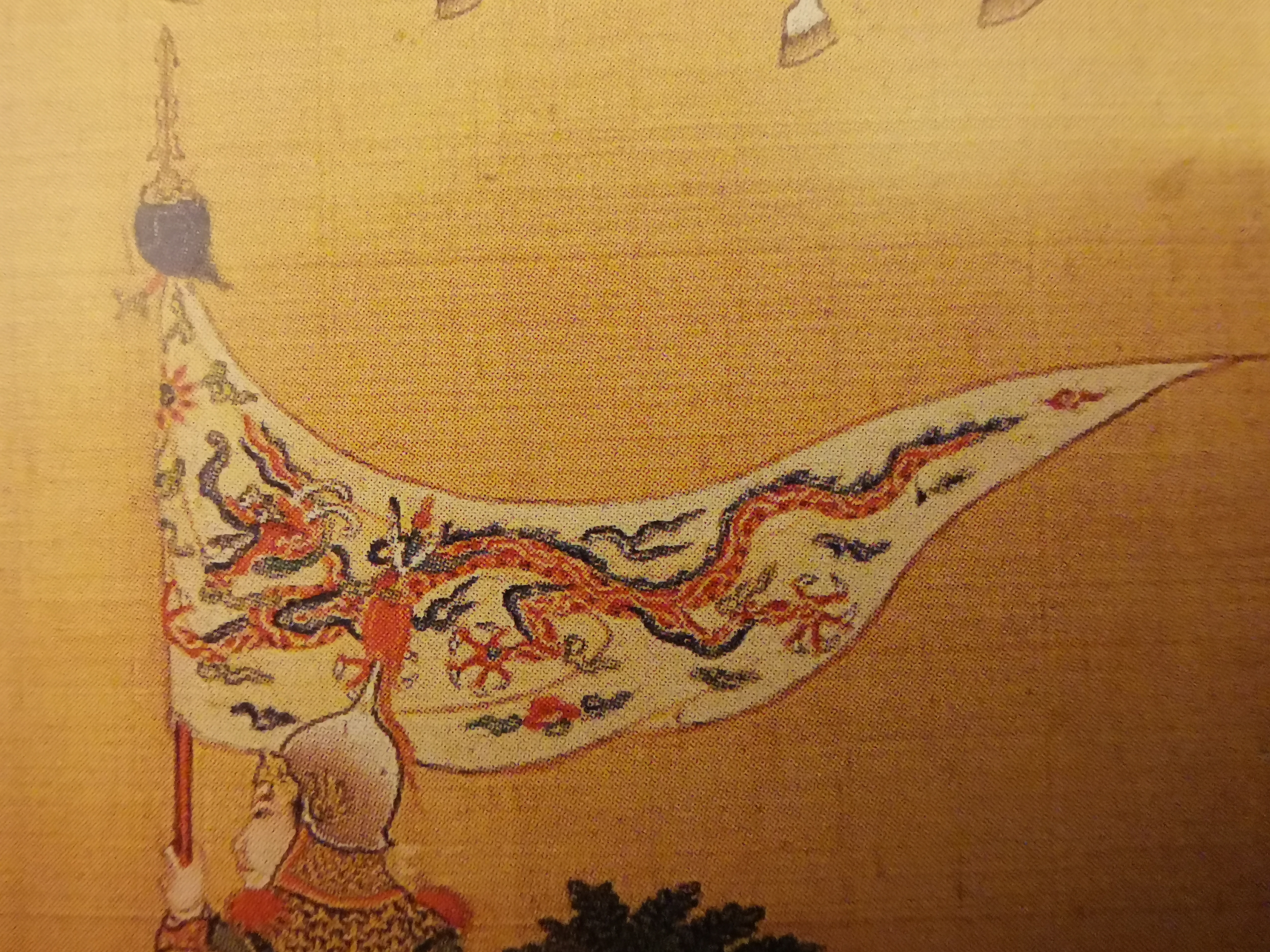
Ming dynasty (1368–1644)

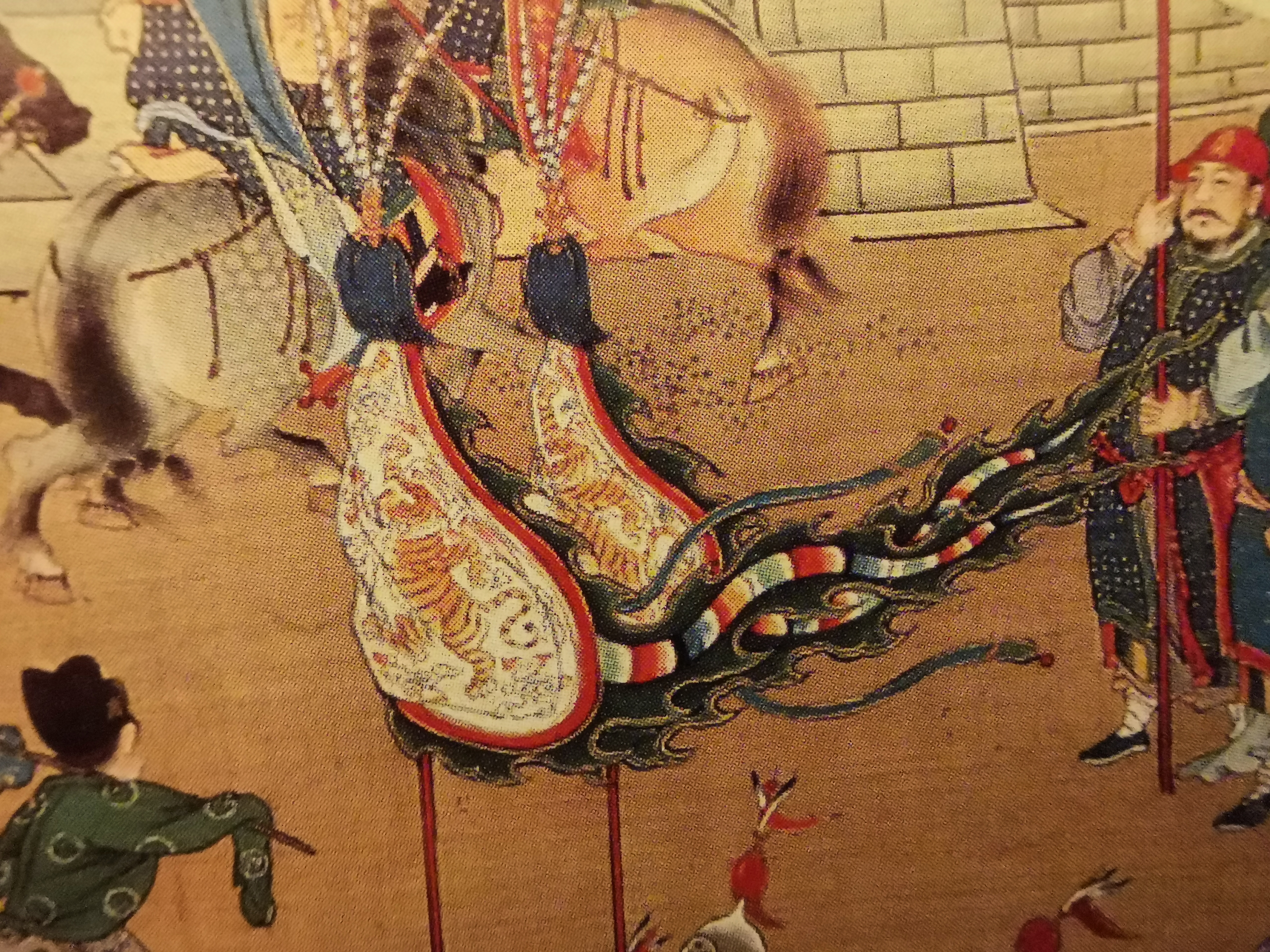
Ming dynasty (1368–1644)

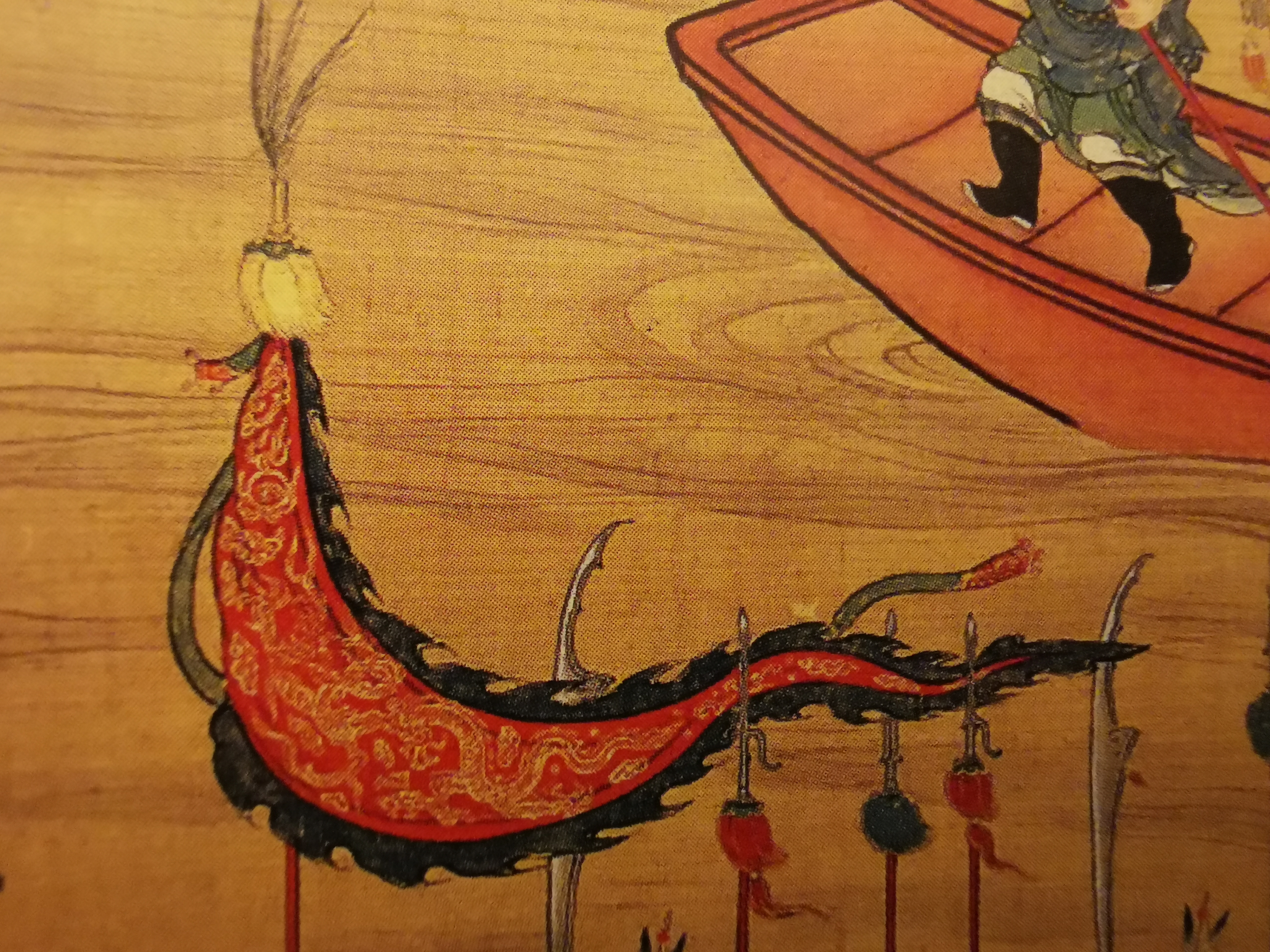
Ming dynasty (1368–1644)

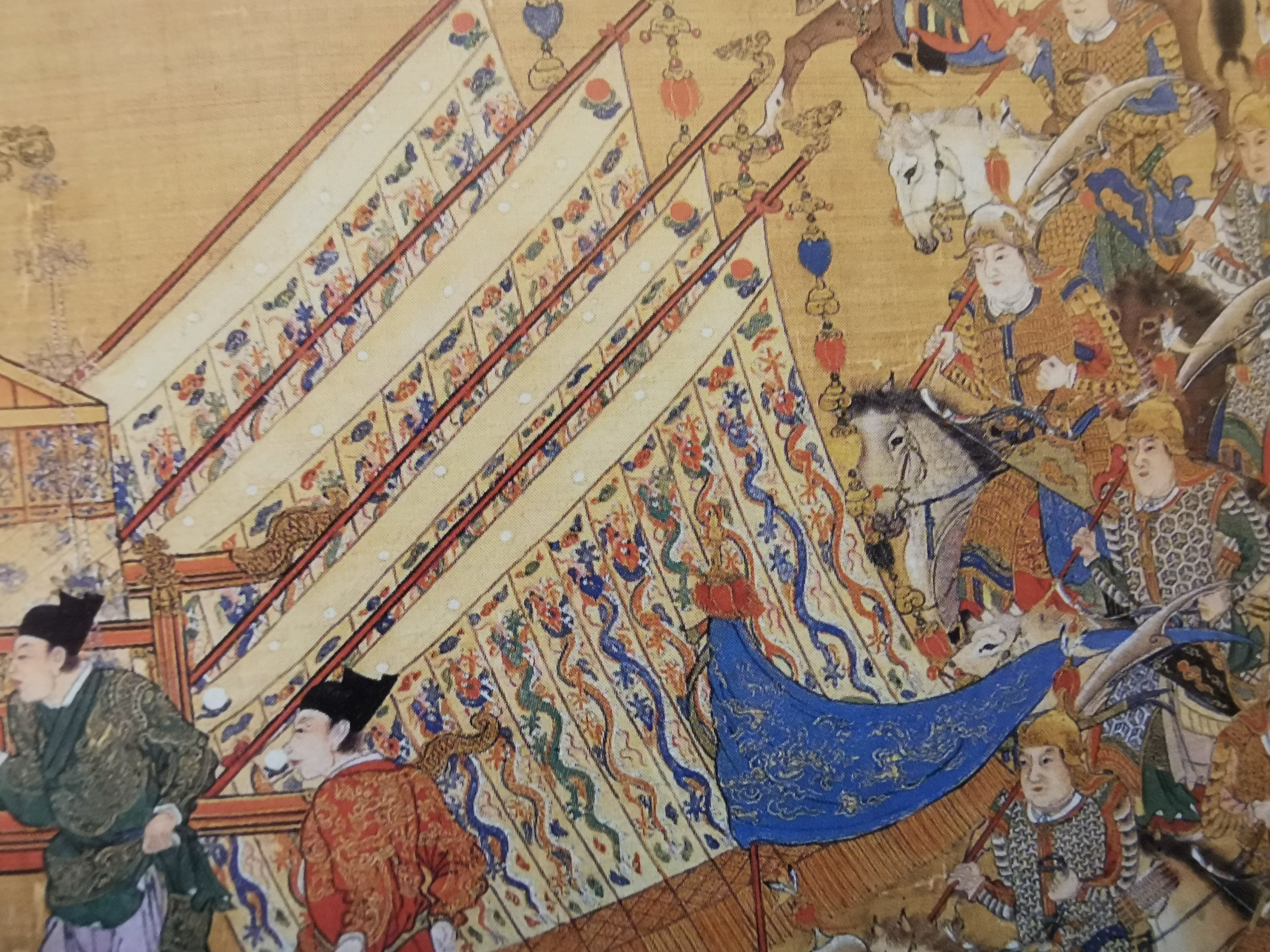
Ming dynasty (1368–1644)

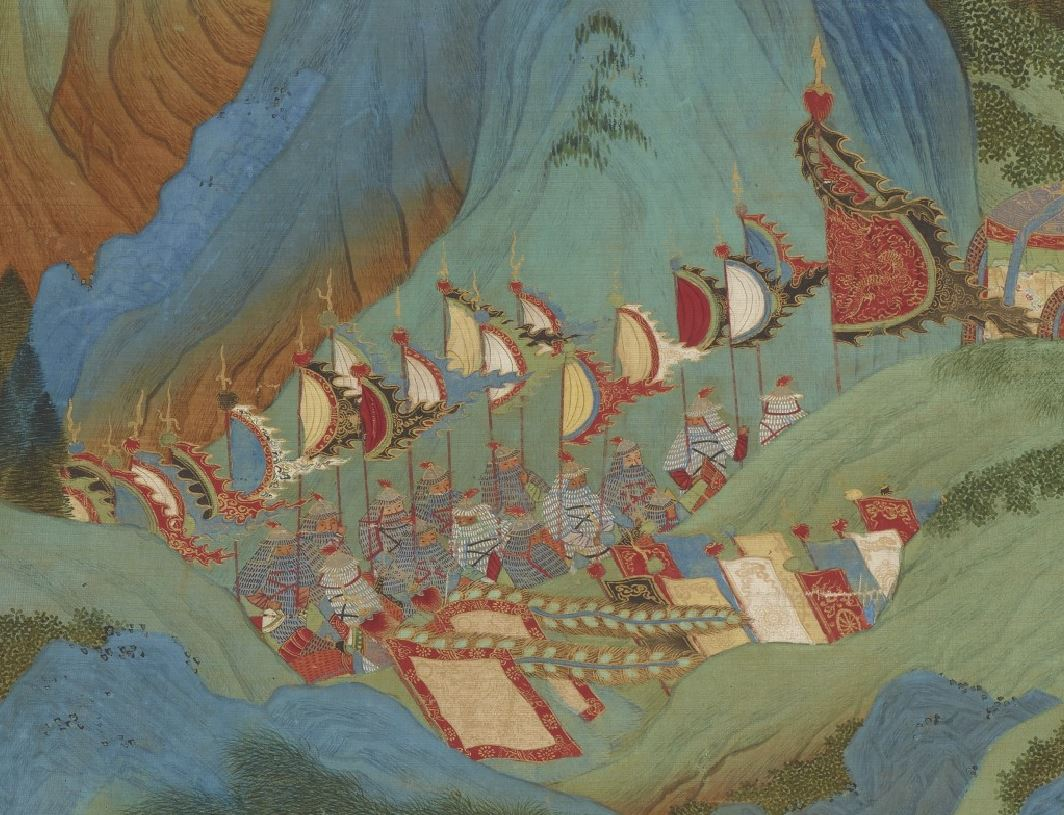
Ming dynasty (1368–1644)

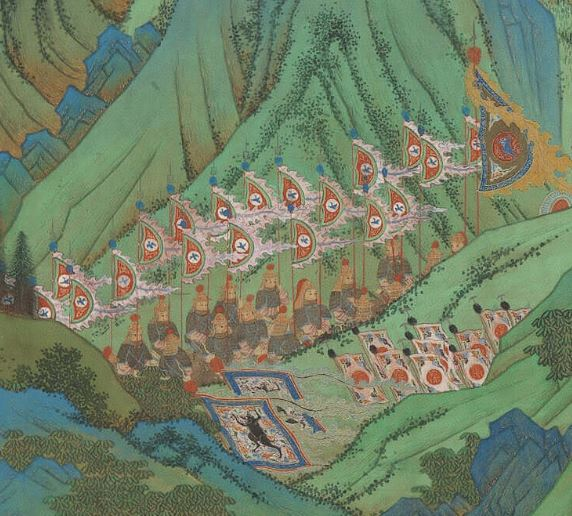
Ming dynasty (1368–1644)

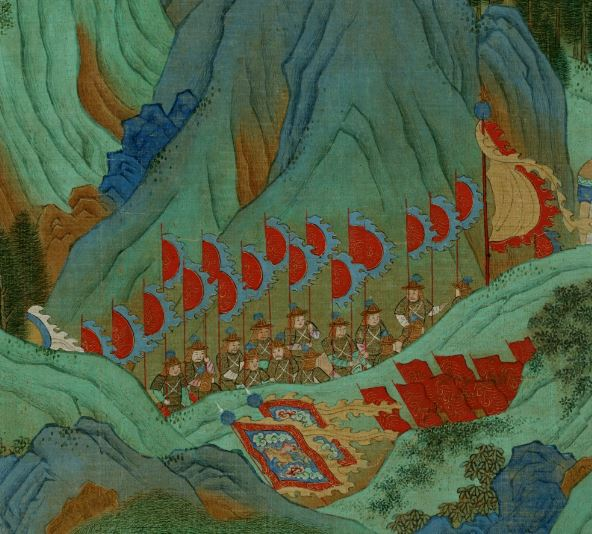
Ming dynasty (1368–1644)

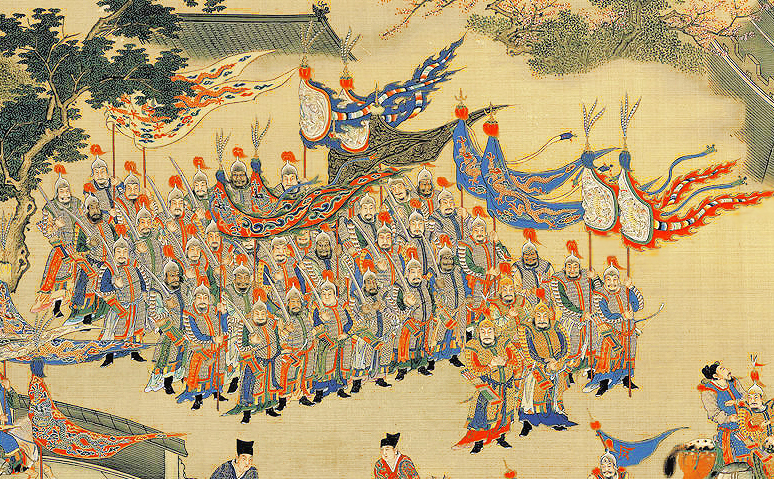
Ming dynasty (1368–1644)

Qing dynasty (1659–1862)

Qing dynasty (1862–1885)

Siamese (1707–1893)

1707–1782

1782–1817

1817–1843

1843–1893

Vietnamese (334 BC – 1848)

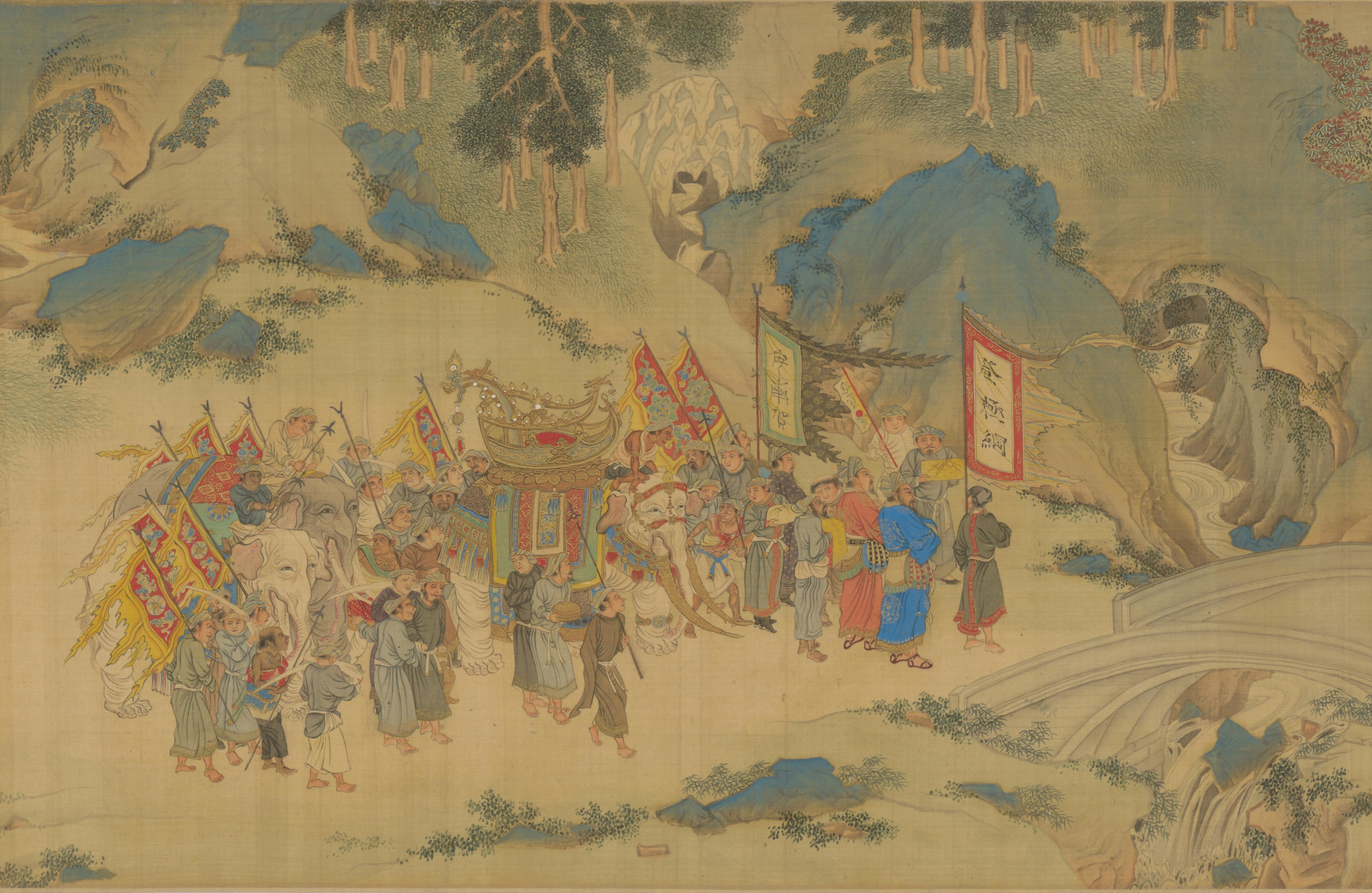
1802–1848

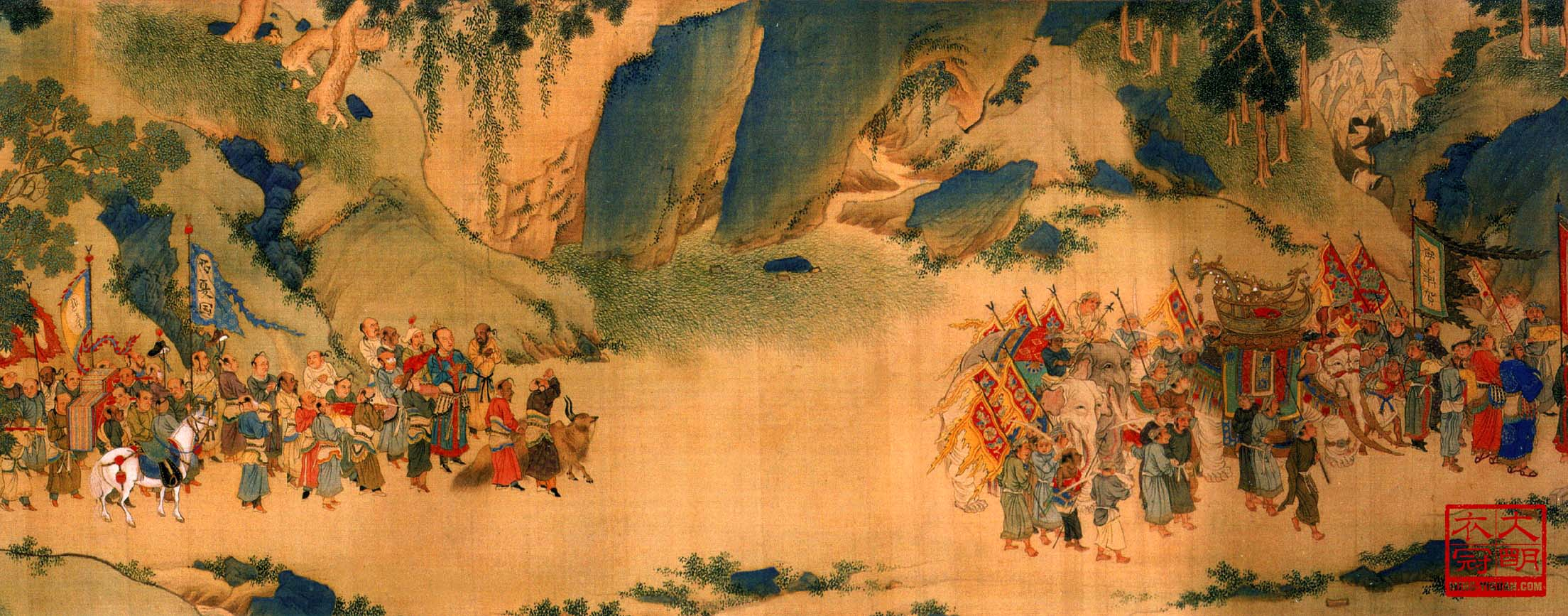
1802–1848

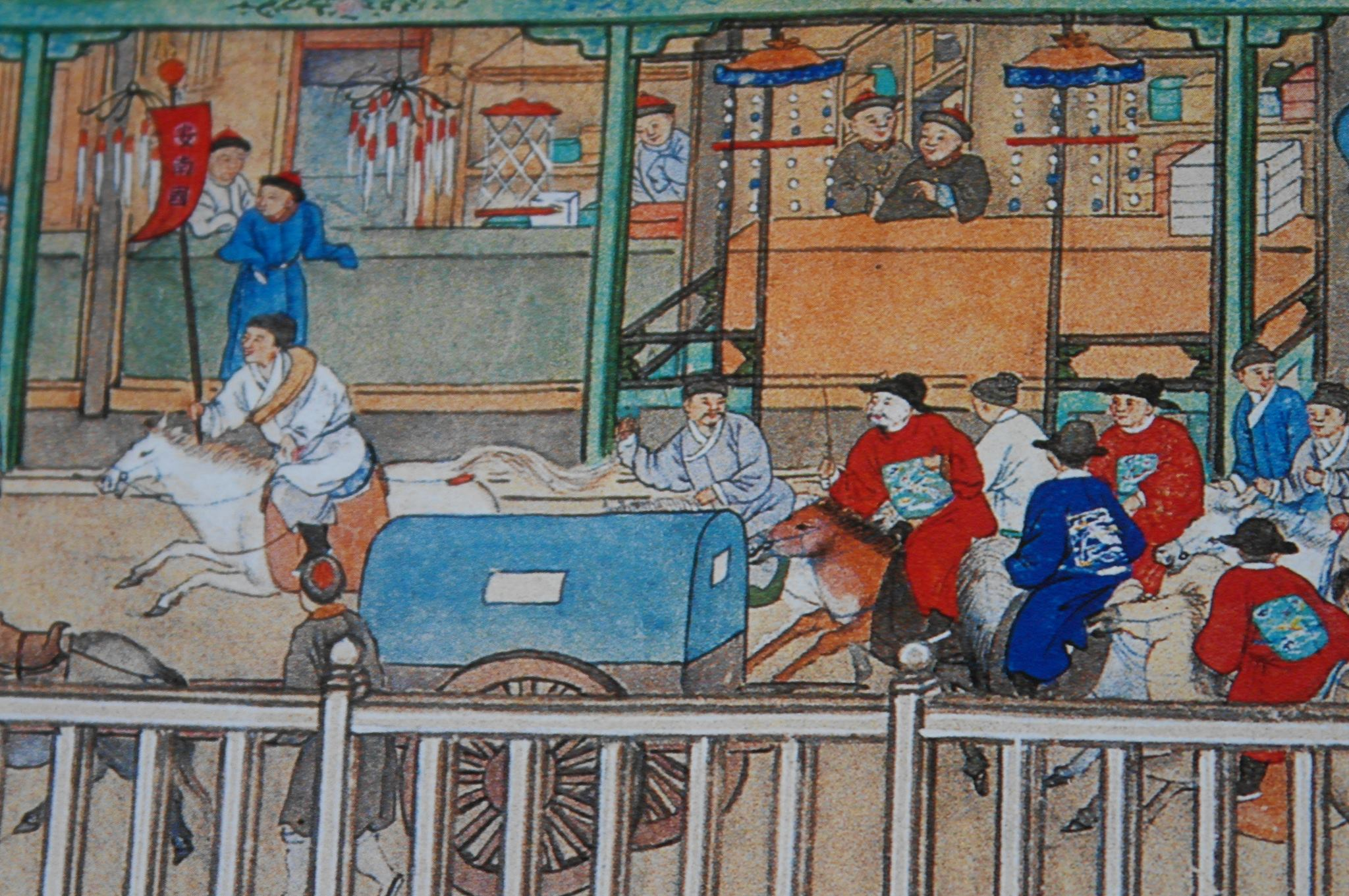
1802–1848

Indochinese (1893–1953)

Laotian countries under the Indochinese union (1893–1945, 1946–1953)

Laotian countries under the Indochinese union (Vichy France) (1940–1941)

Indochina under the GEACPS (Apr. 1945 – Sep. 1945)

Nakhon Champassak and Lan Chang provinces under the Kingdom of Thailand (1941–1946)

North Vietnam during the North Vietnamese invasion of Laos (1958–1959)

== See also ==
- Emblems of Laos
- Anthems of Laos
