= Soulasen Phommasen =

Laotian swimmer

Personal information
- Born: 1992 (age 33–34)

Sport
- Sport: Swimming
- Strokes: Freestyle

Soulasen Phommasen (born 1992) is a Laotian freestyle swimmer. He competed in the 50 m freestyle event at the 2010 FINA World Swimming Championships (25 m) and in the 50 m and 100 m freestyle events at the 2013 World Aquatics Championships.
