= Santisouk Inthavong =

Laotian swimmer

Personal information
- Nationality: Laotian
- Born: 2 September 1999 (age 26) Vientiane, Laos

Sport
- Sport: Swimming

Santisouk Inthavong (born 2 September 1999) is a Laotian backstroke and freestyle swimmer. He competed in the men's 50 metre freestyle event at the 2016 Summer Olympics, where he ranked 69th with a time of 26.54 seconds, a national record. He did not advance to the semifinals.

In 2019, he represented Laos at the 2019 World Aquatics Championships held in Gwangju, South Korea and he finished in 109th place in the heats in the men's 50 metre freestyle event. In the men's 50 metre backstroke he finished in 67th place in the heats.
