= Flag of Laos =

Lao People's Democratic Republic
- Thong dwang deaen (the white moon flag) Sam si (tricolour)
- Use: National flag and ensign
- Proportion: 2:3
- Adopted: 12 October 1945; 2 December 1975 (re-adopted)
- Design: A horizontal triband of red, blue (double height) and red; charged with a white circle in the centre (the diameter of white circle is four-fifths the height of blue band)
- Designed by: Maha Sila Viravong
- Variant of the Lao national flag
- Use: War flag
- Proportion: 2:3

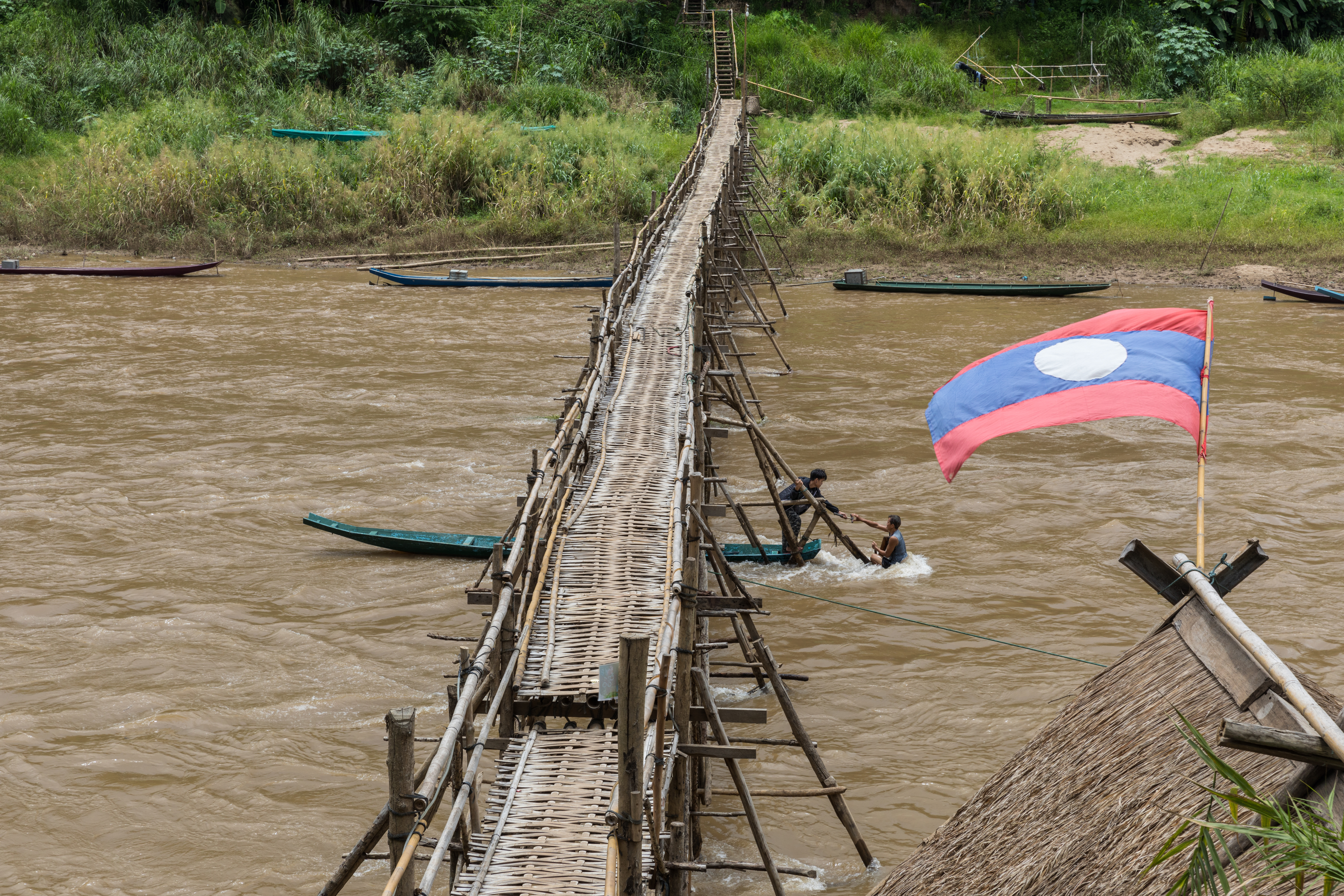
Lao flag in Luang Prabang

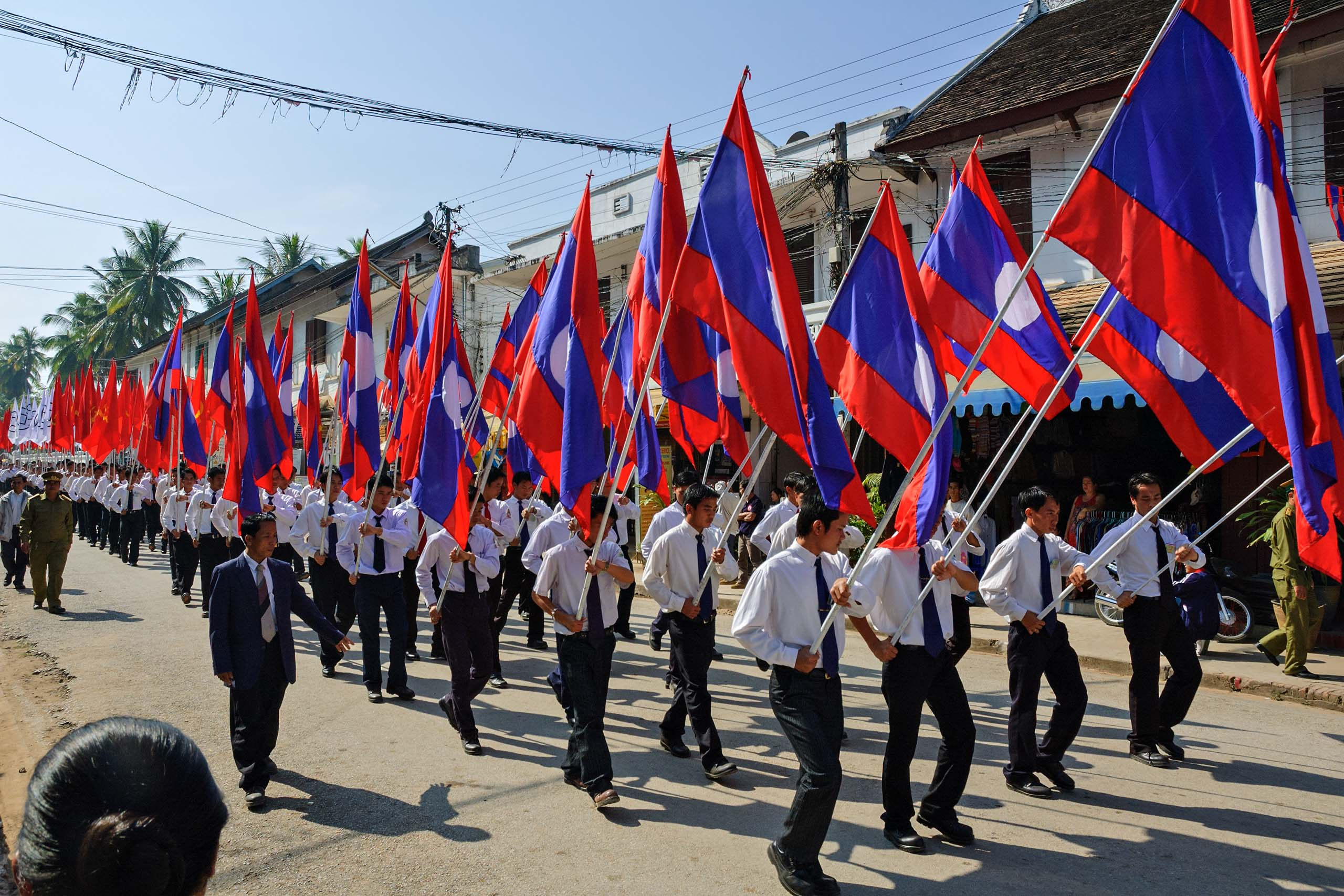
Laos flags in UNESCO World Heritage parade, Luang Prabang, Laos

The national flag of the Lao People's Democratic Republic (Lao: ທຸງດວງເດືອນ, RTGS: thung duang duan, meaning 'Moon flag') consists of three horizontal stripes, with the middle stripe in blue being twice the height of the top and bottom red stripes. In the middle is a white disc, the diameter of the disc is 4/5 the height of the blue stripe. The flag ratio is 2:3. The flag was first adopted in 1945 under the Lao Issara government of 1945–46, then by the Pathet Lao.

== Overview ==
From 1973 to 1975, the Pathet Lao formed part of the government coalition before assuming power directly and prompting the abdication of the king. Their flag was subsequently adopted as the national flag. According to the original creator of the flag, Maha Sila Viravong, the white disk in the center symbolizes the unity of the Lao people (and the future reunification of the two Laotian regions—Laos and northeastern Thailand—divided by the Mekong River) under one nation. It is also said to represent a full moon over the Mekong River.

The red stripes represent the blood shed by the Lao people on both banks of the Mekong River (including the multi-ethnic people of Laos and the Isan people of Northeastern Thailand) in their struggle for freedom and independence from the French, while the blue symbolizes the Mekong River itself, a symbol of the nation’s prosperity.

== History ==
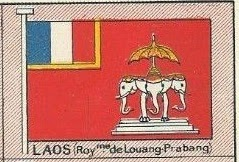
Image of the French protectorate flag of Laos (Kingdom of Luang Prabang)

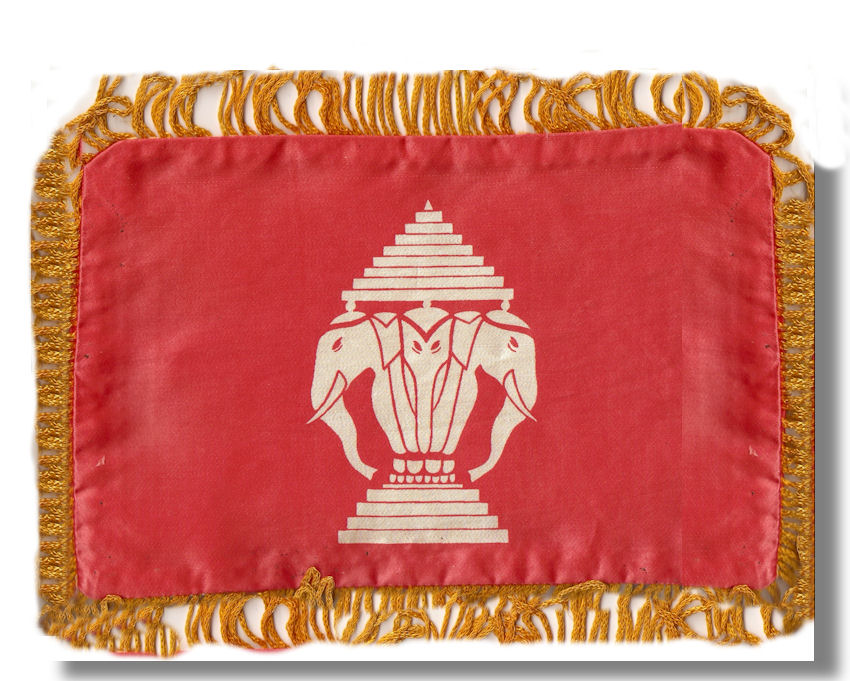
An original 1960s Kingdom of Laos flag with fringe

The flag was designed in 1945 by Maha Sila Viravong, an intellectual, and scholar of literature, history, and culture. As a member of the Lao Issara movement, he was tasked with creating a new Lao national flag that was to be distinct from the royalist red flag with the white 3-headed elephant. Viravong drew inspiration from Thailand's 1917 adoption of a red-white-blue tricolour, replacing the traditional royal flag (a red flag with a white elephant). After the establishment of the Lao Issara government and the adoption of the first Lao constitution on October 12, 1945, Viravong's flag was selected by the government as its national flag, lasting until the reassertion of French control in 1946. The Lao Issara, as a political movement, continued to use the flag in exile until its dissolution in 1949. Its communist-led successor, the Pathet Lao, chose Viravong's flag to represent their movement until the fall of the royal government in 1975, when the Pathet Lao took power and adopted it as the national flag.

From 1952 until the fall of the royal government in 1975, the country had a red flag, with a white 3-headed elephant (representing the Hindu god Erawan) in the middle. On top of the elephant is a 9-folded umbrella, while the elephant itself stands on a 5-level pedestal. The white elephant is a royal symbol in Southeast Asia, including in Myanmar, Thailand and Laos. This flag was adopted by the royal monarchy of Luang Prabang since the beginning of the 20th century under French rule, inspired by its similar flag (red flag with the single white elephant) in Thailand during that time.

The flag remains in use by the Royal Lao Government in Exile and Laotian opposition groups. In 2015, the city of Smithfield, Rhode Island passed a resolution to adopt the royalist flag as its "Heritage and Freedom" flag.

== Historical flags ==
Flag of Kingdom of Vientiane (1707–1828)

Flag of the Kingdom of Luang Phrabang (1707–1893)

Flag of the Kingdom of Champasak (1713–1904)

Flag of French protectorate of Laos (1893–1947)

Flag of the Kingdom of Laos / Royal Lao Government in Exile (1947–1975, 2003-current)

== Colour schemes ==
Laos	Blue	Red	White
RGB	0-40-104	206-17-38	255-255-255
Hexadecimal	#002868	#CE1126	#FFFFFF
CMYK	100, 62, 0, 59	0, 92, 82, 19	0, 0, 0, 0

Laos	Red	White
RGB	215-0-0	255-255-255
Hexadecimal	#D70000	#FFFFFF
CMYK	0, 100, 100, 16	0, 0, 0, 0

== See also ==
- List of flags of Laos
- Flag of Mongolia (similar triband, vertical pattern instead of horizontal)
- Flag of Belize (similar design with a white circle defaced by the national coat of arms)
