= Laos at the 2011 World Aquatics Championships =

Sporting event delegation

Flag of Laos

Laos competed at the 2011 World Aquatics Championships in Shanghai, China between July 16 and 31, 2011.

== Swimming ==
Laos qualified 2 swimmers.

Men

Athlete	Event	Heats		Semifinals		Final	
Athlete	Event	Time	Rank	Time	Rank	Time	Rank
Phathana Inthavong	Men's 50m Freestyle	28.94	101	did not advance			
Phathana Inthavong	Men's 50m Backstroke	35.30	37	did not advance			

Women

Athlete	Event	Heats		Semifinals		Final	
Athlete	Event	Time	Rank	Time	Rank	Time	Rank
Vilayphone Vongphachanh	Women's 50m Freestyle	35.99	79	did not advance			
Vilayphone Vongphachanh	Women's 50m Breaststroke	46.37	32	did not advance			
