= List of Commonwealth Games medallists in athletics (men) =

This is the complete list of Commonwealth Games medallists in men's athletics from 1930 to 2022. In 1970, most track events converted from races measured in yards to near-equivalents measured in metres. The list below treats these as separate events, but includes a link from the metric event to its previous imperial equivalent.

== Current events ==
=== 100 metres ===
Event distances at the Commonwealth Games became metric in 1970. For the equivalent pre-metric events see 100 yrds.

Games	Gold		Silver		Bronze	
1970	Don Quarrie; Jamaica	10.24 w	Lennox Miller; Jamaica	10.32 w	Hasely Crawford; Trinidad and Tobago	10.33 w
1974	Don Quarrie; Jamaica	10.38	John Mwebi; Kenya	10.51	Ohene Karikari; Ghana	10.51
1978	Don Quarrie; Jamaica	10.03 w	Allan Wells; Scotland	10.07 w	Hasely Crawford; Trinidad and Tobago	10.09 w
1982	Allan Wells; Scotland	10.02 w	Ben Johnson; Canada	10.05 w	Cameron Sharp; Scotland	10.07 w
1986	Ben Johnson; Canada	10.07	Linford Christie; England	10.28	Mike McFarlane; England	10.35
1990	Linford Christie; England	9.93 w	Davidson Ezinwa; Nigeria	10.05 w	Bruny Surin; Canada	10.12 w
1994	Linford Christie; England	9.91 GR	Michael Green; Jamaica	10.05	Frankie Fredericks; Namibia	10.06
1998	Ato Boldon; Trinidad and Tobago	9.88 GR	Frankie Fredericks; Namibia	9.96	Obadele Thompson; Barbados	10.00
2002	Kim Collins; Saint Kitts and Nevis	9.98	Uchenna Emedolu; Nigeria	10.11	Pierre Browne; Canada	10.12
2006	Asafa Powell; Jamaica	10.03	Olusoji Fasuba; Nigeria	10.11	Marc Burns; Trinidad and Tobago	10.17
2010	Lerone Clarke; Jamaica	10.12	Mark Lewis-Francis; England	10.20	Aaron Armstrong; Trinidad and Tobago	10.24
2014	Kemar Bailey-Cole; Jamaica	10.00	Adam Gemili; England	10.10	Nickel Ashmeade; Jamaica	10.12
2018	Akani Simbine; South Africa	10.03	Henricho Bruintjies; South Africa	10.17	Yohan Blake; Jamaica	10.19
2022	Ferdinand Omanyala; Kenya	10.02	Akani Simbine; South Africa	10.13	Yupun Abeykoon; Sri Lanka	10.14

=== 200 metres ===
Event distances at the Commonwealth Games became metric in 1970. For the equivalent pre-metric events see 220 yrds.

Games	Gold		Silver		Bronze	
1970	Don Quarrie; Jamaica	20.56	Edwin Roberts; Trinidad and Tobago	20.69	Charles Asati; Kenya	20.74
1974	Don Quarrie; Jamaica	20.73	George Daniels; Ghana	20.97	Bevan Smith; New Zealand	21.08
1978	Allan Wells; Scotland	20.12 w	James Gilkes; Guyana	20.18 w	Colin Bradford; Jamaica	20.43 w
1982	Mike McFarlane; England; Allan Wells; Scotland	20.43	Not awarded		Cameron Sharp; Scotland	20.55
1986	Atlee Mahorn; Canada	20.31	Todd Bennett; England	20.54	Ben Johnson; Canada	20.64
1990	Marcus Adam; England	20.10 w	John Regis; England	20.16 w	Ade Mafe; England	20.26 w
1994	Frankie Fredericks; Namibia	19.97 GR	John Regis; England	20.25	Daniel Effiong; Nigeria	20.40
1998	Julian Golding; England	20.18	Christian Malcolm; Wales	20.29	John Regis; England	20.40
2002	Frankie Fredericks; Namibia	20.06	Marlon Devonish; England	20.19	Darren Campbell; England	20.21
2006	Omar Brown; Jamaica	20.47	Stéphan Buckland; Mauritius	20.47	Chris Williams; Jamaica	20.52
2010	Leon Baptiste; England	20.45	Lansford Spence; Jamaica	20.49	Christian Malcolm; Wales	20.52
2014	Rasheed Dwyer; Jamaica	20.14	Warren Weir; Jamaica	20.26	Jason Livermore; Jamaica	20.32
2018	Jereem Richards; Trinidad and Tobago	20.12	Aaron Brown; Canada	20.34	Leon Reid; Northern Ireland	20.55
2022	Jereem Richards; Trinidad and Tobago	19.80 GR	Zharnel Hughes; England	20.12	Joseph Amoah; Ghana	20.49

=== 400 metres ===
Event distances at the Commonwealth Games became metric in 1970. For the equivalent pre-metric events see 440 yrds.

Games	Gold		Silver		Bronze	
1970	Charles Asati; Kenya	45.01	Ross Wilson; Australia	45.61	Saimoni Tamani; Fiji	45.82
1974	Charles Asati; Kenya	46.04	Silver Ayoo; Uganda	46.07	Claver Kamanya; Tanzania	46.16
1978	Rick Mitchell; Australia	46.34	Joseph Coombs; Trinidad and Tobago	46.54	Glenn Bogue; Canada	46.63
1982	Bert Cameron; Jamaica	45.89	Rick Mitchell; Australia	46.61	Gary Minihan; Australia	46.68
1986	Roger Black; England	45.57	Darren Clark; Australia	45.98	Phil Brown; England	46.8
1990	Darren Clark; Australia	44.60	Samson Kitur; Kenya	44.88	Simeon Kipkemboi; Kenya	44.93
1994	Charles Gitonga; Kenya	45.00	Du'aine Ladejo; England	45.11	Sunday Bada; Nigeria	45.45
1998	Iwan Thomas; Wales	44.52 GR	Mark Richardson; England	44.60	Sugath Thilakaratne; Sri Lanka	44.64
2002	Michael Blackwood; Jamaica	45.07	Shane Niemi; Canada	45.09	Avard Moncur; Bahamas	45.12
2006	John Steffensen; Australia	44.73	Alleyne Francique; Grenada	45.09	Jermaine Gonzales; Jamaica	45.16
2010	Mark Mutai; Kenya	45.44	Sean Wroe; Australia	45.46	Ramon Miller; Bahamas	45.55
2014	Kirani James; Grenada	44.24 GR	Wayde van Niekerk; South Africa	44.68	Lalonde Gordon; Trinidad and Tobago	44.78
2018	Isaac Makwala; Botswana	44.35	Baboloki Thebe; Botswana	45.09	Javon Francis; Jamaica	45.11
2022	Muzala Samukonga; Zambia	44.66	Matthew Hudson-Smith; England	44.81	Jonathan Jones; Barbados	44.89

=== 800 metres ===
Event distances at the Commonwealth Games became metric in 1970. For the equivalent pre-metric events see 880 yrds.

Games	Gold		Silver		Bronze	
1970	Robert Ouko; Kenya	1:46.89	Ben Cayenne; Trinidad and Tobago	1:47.42	Bill Smart; Canada	1:47.43
1974	John Kipkurgat; Kenya	1:43.91	Mike Boit; Kenya	1:44.39	John Walker; New Zealand	1:44.92
1978	Mike Boit; Kenya	1:46.39	Seymour Newman; Jamaica	1:47.30	Peter Lemashon; Kenya	1:47.57
1982	Peter Bourke; Australia	1:45.18	James Maina Boi; Kenya	1:45.45	Chris McGeorge; England	1:45.60
1986	Steve Cram; England	1:43.22 GR	Tom McKean; Scotland	1:44.80	Peter Elliott; England	1:45.42
1990	Sammy Tirop; Kenya	1:45.98	Nixon Kiprotich; Kenya	1:46.00	Matthew Yates; England	1:46.62
1994	Patrick Konchellah; Kenya	1:45.18	Hezekiél Sepeng; South Africa	1:45.76	Savieri Ngidhi; Zimbabwe	1:46.06
1998	Japheth Kimutai; Kenya	1:43.82	Hezekiél Sepeng; South Africa	1:44.44	Johan Botha; South Africa	1:44.57
2002	Mbulaeni Mulaudzi; South Africa	1:46.32	Joseph Mutua; Kenya	1:46.57	Kris McCarthy; Australia	1:46.79
2006	Alex Kipchirchir; Kenya	1:45.88	Achraf Tadili; Canada	1:46.93	John Litei; Kenya	1:46.98
2010	Boaz Kiplagat Lalang; Kenya	1:46.60	Richard Kiplagat; Kenya	1:46.95	Abraham Kiplagat; Kenya	1:47.37
2014	Nijel Amos; Botswana	1:45.18	David Rudisha; Kenya	1:45.48	André Olivier; South Africa	1:46.03
2018	Wyclife Kinyamal; Kenya	1:45.11	Kyle Langford; England	1:45.16	Luke Mathews; Australia	1:45.60
2022	Wyclife Kinyamal; Kenya	1:47.52	Peter Bol; Australia	1:47.66	Ben Pattison; England	1:48.25

=== 1500 metres ===
Event distances at the Commonwealth Games became metric in 1970. For the equivalent pre-metric events see the Mile.

Games	Gold		Silver		Bronze	
1970	Kipchoge Keino; Kenya	3:36.68	Dick Quax; New Zealand	3:38.19	Brendan Foster; England	3:40.63
1974	Filbert Bayi; Tanzania	3:32.16 WR	John Walker; New Zealand	3:32.52	Ben Jipcho; Kenya	3:33.16
1978	David Moorcroft; England	3:35.48	Filbert Bayi; Tanzania	3:35.59	John Robson; Scotland	3:35.60
1982	Steve Cram; England	3:42.37	John Walker; New Zealand	3:43:11	Mike Boit; Kenya	3:43.33
1986	Steve Cram; England	3:50.87	John Gladwin; England	3:52.17	David Campbell; Canada	3:54.06
1990	Peter Elliott; England	3:33.39	Wilfred Kirochi; Kenya	3:34.41	Peter O'Donoghue; New Zealand	3:35.14
1994	Reuben Chesang; Kenya	3:36.70	Kevin Sullivan; Canada	3:36.78	John Mayock; England	3:37.22
1998	Laban Rotich; Kenya	3:39.49	John Mayock; England	3:40.46	Anthony Whiteman; England	3:40.70
2002	Michael East; England	3:37.35	William Chirchir; Kenya	3:37.70	Youcef Abdi; Australia	3:37.77
2006	Nick Willis; New Zealand	3:38.49	Nathan Brannen; Canada	3:39.20	Mark Fountain; Australia	3:39.33
2010	Silas Kiplagat; Kenya	3:41:78	James Kiplagat Magut; Kenya	3:42:27	Nick Willis; New Zealand	3:42:38
2014	James Kiplagat Magut; Kenya	3:39.31	Ronald Kwemoi; Kenya	3:39.53	Nick Willis; New Zealand	3:39.60
2018	Elijah Manangoi; Kenya	3:34.78	Timothy Cheruiyot; Kenya	3:35.17	Jake Wightman; Scotland	3:35.97
2022	Oliver Hoare; Australia	3:30.12 GR	Timothy Cheruiyot; Kenya	3:30.21	Jake Wightman; Scotland	3:30.53

=== 5000 metres ===
Event distances at the Commonwealth Games became metric in 1970. For the equivalent pre-metric events see 3 miles.

Games	Gold		Silver		Bronze	
1970	Ian Stewart; Scotland	13:22.85	Ian McCafferty; Scotland	13:23.34	Kipchoge Keino; Kenya	13:27.6
1974	Ben Jipcho; Kenya	13:14.03	Brendan Foster; England	13:14.06	Dave Black; England	13:23.6
1978	Henry Rono; Kenya	13:23.04	Michael Musyoki; Kenya	13:29.92	Brendan Foster; England	13:31.35
1982	David Moorcroft; England	13:33.00	Nick Rose; England	13:35.97	Peter Koech; Kenya	13:36.95
1986	Steve Ovett; England	13:24.11	Jack Buckner; England	13:25.87	Tim Hutchings; England	13:26.84
1990	Andrew Lloyd; Australia	13:24.86	John Ngugi; Kenya	13:24.94	Ian Hamer; Wales	13:25.63
1994	Robert Denmark; England	13:23.00	Phillimon Hanneck; Zimbabwe	13:23.20	John Nuttall; England	13:23.54
1998	Daniel Komen; Kenya	13:22.57	Tom Nyariki; Kenya	13:28.09	Richard Limo; Kenya	13:37.42
2002	Sammy Kipketer; Kenya	13:13.51	Benjamin Limo; Kenya	13:13.57	William Kirui; Kenya	13:18.02
2006	Augustine Kiprono Choge; Kenya	12:56.41 GR	Craig Mottram; Australia	12:58.19	Benjamin Limo; Kenya	13:05.30
2010	Moses Ndiema Kipsiro; Uganda	13:31.25	Eliud Kipchoge; Kenya	13:31.32	Mark Kiptoo; Kenya	13:32.58
2014	Caleb Ndiku; Kenya	13:12.07	Isiah Koech; Kenya	13:14.06	Zane Robertson; New Zealand	13:16.52
2018	Joshua Cheptegei; Uganda	13:50.83	Mohammed Ahmed; Canada	13:52.78	Edward Zakayo; Kenya	13:54.06
2022	Jacob Kiplimo; Uganda	13:08.08	Nicholas Kimeli; Kenya	13:08.19	Jacob Krop; Kenya	13:08.48

=== 10,000 metres ===
Event distances at the Commonwealth Games became metric in 1970. For the equivalent pre-metric events see 6 miles.

Games	Gold		Silver		Bronze	
1970	Lachie Stewart; Scotland	28:11.72	Ron Clarke; Australia	28:13.45	Dick Taylor; England	28:15.35
1974	Dick Tayler; New Zealand	27:46.40	Dave Black; England	27:48.49	Richard Juma; Kenya	27:56.96
1978	Brendan Foster; England	28:13.65	Michael Musyoki; Kenya	28:19.14	Mike McLeod; England	28:34.30
1982	Gidamis Shahanga; Tanzania	28:10.15	Zakariah Barie; Tanzania	28:10:55	Julian Goater; England	28:16.11
1986	Jon Solly; England	27:57.42	Steve Binns; England	27:58.01	Steve Jones; Wales	28:02.48
1990	Eamonn Martin; England	28:08.57	Moses Tanui; Kenya	28:11.56	Paul Williams; Canada	28:12.71
1994	Lameck Aguta; Kenya	28:38.22	Tendai Chimusasa; Zimbabwe	28:47.72	Fackson Nkandu; Zambia	28:51.72
1998	Simon Maina; Kenya	28:10.00	William Kalya; Kenya	29:01.68	Steve Moneghetti; Australia	29:02.76
2002	Wilberforce Talel; Kenya	27:45.39 GR	Paul Malakwen Kosgei; Kenya	27:45.46	John Yuda Msuri; Tanzania	27:45.78
2006	Boniface Toroitich Kiprop; Uganda	27:50.99	Geoffrey Kipngeno; Kenya	27:51.16	Fabiano Joseph Naasi; Tanzania	27:51.99
2010	Moses Ndiema Kipsiro; Uganda	27:57.39	Daniel Lemashon Salel; Kenya	27:57.57	Joseph Kiptoo Birech; Kenya	27:58.58
2014	Moses Ndiema Kipsiro; Uganda	27:56.11	Josphat Bett Kipkoech; Kenya	27:56.14	Cameron Levins; Canada	27.56.23
2018	Joshua Cheptegei; Uganda	27:19.62	Mohammed Ahmed; Canada	27:20.56	Rodgers Kwemoi; Kenya	27:28.66
2022	Jacob Kiplimo; Uganda	27:09.19 GR	Daniel Ebenyo; Kenya	27:11.26	Kibiwott Kandie; Kenya	27:20.34

=== 110 metres hurdles ===
Event distances at the Commonwealth Games became metric in 1970. For the equivalent pre-metric events see 120 yrds hurdles.

Games	Gold		Silver		Bronze	
1970	David Hemery; England	13.66 (w)	Mal Baird; Australia	13.86 (w)	Godfrey Murray; Jamaica	14.02 (w)
1974	Fatwell Kimaiyo; Kenya	13.69	Berwyn Price; Wales	13.84	Max Binnington; Australia	13.88
1978	Berwyn Price; Wales	13.70 (w)	Max Binnington; Australia	13.73 (w)	Warren Parr; Australia	13.73 (w)
1982	Mark McKoy; Canada	13.37	Mark Holtom; England	13.43	Don Wright; Australia	13.58
1986	Mark McKoy; Canada	13.31 (w)	Colin Jackson; Wales	13.42 (w)	Don Wright; Australia	13.64 (w)
1990	Colin Jackson; Wales	13.08	Tony Jarrett; England	13.34	David Nelson; England	13.54
1994	Colin Jackson; Wales	13.08 GR	Tony Jarrett; England	13.22	Paul Gray; Wales	13.54
1998	Tony Jarrett; England	13.47	Steve Brown; Trinidad and Tobago	13.48	Shaun Bownes; South Africa	13.53
2002	Shaun Bownes; South Africa	13.35	Colin Jackson; Wales	13.39	Maurice Wignall; Jamaica	13.62
2006	Maurice Wignall; Jamaica	13.26	Chris Baillie; Scotland	13.61	Andy Turner; England	13.62
2010	Andy Turner; England	13.38	William Sharman; England	13.50	Lawrence Clarke; England	13.70
2014	Andrew Riley; Jamaica	13.32	William Sharman; England	13.36	Shane Brathwaite; Barbados	13.49
2018	Ronald Levy; Jamaica	13.19	Hansle Parchment; Jamaica	13.22	Nicholas Hough; Australia	13.38
2022	Rasheed Broadbell; Jamaica	13.08 GR	Shane Brathwaite; Barbados	13.30	Andrew Pozzi; England	13.37

=== 400 metres hurdles ===
Event distances at the Commonwealth Games became metric in 1970. For the equivalent pre-metric events see 440 yrds hurdles.

Games	Gold		Silver		Bronze	
1970	John Sherwood; England	50.03	Bill Koskei; Kenya	50.15	Charles Kipkemboi Yego; Kenya	50.19
1974	Alan Pascoe; England	48.83	Bruce Field; Australia	49.32	Bill Koskei; Kenya	49.34
1978	Daniel Kimaiyo; Kenya	49.48	Garry Brown; Australia	50.04	Alan Pascoe; England	50.09
1982	Garry Brown; Australia	49.37	Peter Rwamuhanda; Uganda	49.95	Greg Rolle; Bahamas	50.50
1986	Phil Beattie; Northern Ireland	49.60	Max Robertson; England	49.77	John Graham; Canada	50.25
1990	Kriss Akabusi; England	48.89	Gideon Yego; Kenya	49.25	John Graham; Canada	50.24
1994	Samuel Matete; Zambia	48.67	Gideon Biwott; Kenya	49.43	Barnabas Kinyor; Kenya	49.50
1998	Dinsdale Morgan; Jamaica	48.28	Rohan Robinson; Australia	48.99	Ken Harnden; Zimbabwe	49.06
2002	Chris Rawlinson; England	49.14	Matthew Elias; Wales	49.28	Ian Weakley; Jamaica	49.69
2006	L. J. van Zyl; South Africa	48.05 GR	Alwyn Myburgh; South Africa	48.23	Kemel Thompson; Jamaica	48.65
2010	Dai Greene; Wales	48.52	L. J. van Zyl; South Africa	48.63	Rhys Williams; Wales	49.19
2014	Cornel Fredericks; South Africa	48.50	Jehue Gordon; Trinidad and Tobago	48.75	Jeffery Gibson; Bahamas	48.78
2018	Kyron McMaster; British Virgin Islands	48.25	Jeffery Gibson; Bahamas	49.10	Jaheel Hyde; Jamaica	49.16
2022	Kyron McMaster; British Virgin Islands	48.93	Jaheel Hyde; Jamaica	49.78	Alastair Chalmers; Guernsey	49.97

=== 3000 metres steeplechase ===
Games	Gold		Silver		Bronze	
1930	George Bailey; England	9:52.0	Alex Hillhouse; Australia	?	Vernon Morgan; England	?
1934	Stanley Scarsbrook; England	10:23	Tom Evenson; England	10:25.8e	George Bailey; England	?
1962	Trevor Vincent; Australia	8:43.4 GR	Maurice Herriott; England	8:45.0	Ron Blackney; Australia	9:00.6
1966	Peter Welsh; New Zealand	8:29.44	Kerry O'Brien; Australia	8:32.58	Benjamin Kogo; Kenya	8:32.81
1970	Tony Manning; Australia	8:26.2	Ben Jipcho; Kenya	8:29.6	Amos Biwott; Kenya	8:30.8
1974	Ben Jipcho; Kenya	8:20.67	John Davies; Wales	8:24.8	Evans Mogaka; Kenya	8:28.51
1978	Henry Rono; Kenya	8:26.54	James Munyala; Kenya	8:32.21	Kip Rono; Kenya	8:34.07
1982	Julius Korir; Kenya	8:23.94	Graeme Fell; England	8:26.64	Greg Duhaime; Canada	8:29:14
1986	Graeme Fell; Canada	8:24.49	Roger Hackney; Wales	8:25.15	Colin Reitz; England	8:26.14
1990	Julius Kariuki; Kenya	8:20.64	Joshua Kipkemboi; Kenya	8:24.26	Colin Walker; England	8:26.50
1994	Johnstone Kipkoech; Kenya	8:14.72 GR	Gideon Chirchir; Kenya	8:15.25	Graeme Fell; Canada	8:23.28
1998	John Kosgei; Kenya	8:15.34	Bernard Barmasai; Kenya	8:15.37	Kipkurui Misoi; Kenya	8:18.24
2002	Stephen Cherono; Kenya	8:19.41	Ezekiel Kemboi; Kenya	8:19.78	Abraham Cherono; Kenya	8:19.85
2006	Ezekiel Kemboi; Kenya	8:18.17	Wesley Kiprotich; Kenya	8:19.38	Reuben Kosgei; Kenya	8:19.82
2010	Richard Mateelong; Kenya	8:16.39	Ezekiel Kemboi; Kenya	8:18.47	Brimin Kipruto; Kenya	8:19.65
2014	Jonathan Ndiku; Kenya	8:10.44	Jairus Birech; Kenya	8:12.68	Ezekiel Kemboi; Kenya	8:19.73
2018	Conseslus Kipruto; Kenya	8:10.08 GR	Abraham Kibiwot; Kenya	8:10.62	Amos Kirui; Kenya	8:12.24
2022	Abraham Kibiwot; Kenya	8:11.15	Avinash Sable; India	8:11.20	Amos Serem; Kenya	8:16.83

=== 4 x 100 metres relay ===
Event distances at the Commonwealth Games became metric in 1970. For the equivalent pre-metric events see 4 x 110 yrds relay.

Games	Gold		Silver		Bronze	
1970	Jamaica; Carl Lawson; Don Quarrie; Errol Stewart; Lennox Miller	39.46	Ghana; Edward Owusu; George Daniels; James Addy; Michael Ahey	39.82	England; Brian Green; Dave Dear; Ian Green; Martin Reynolds	40.05
1974	Australia; Andrew Ratcliffe; Graham Haskell; Greg Lewis; Laurie D'Arcy	39.31	Ghana; Albert Lomotey; George Daniels; Kofi Okyir; Ohene Karikari	39.61	Nigeria; Benedict Majekodunmi; James Olakunle; Kola Abdulai; Timon Oyebami	39.70
1978	Scotland; Allan Wells; Drew McMaster; David Jenkins; Cameron Sharp	39.24	Trinidad and Tobago; Christopher Brathwaite; Edwin Noel; Ephraim Serrette; Hasely Crawford	39.29	Jamaica; Colin Bradford; Errol Quarrie; Floyd Brown; Oliver Heywood	39.33
1982	Nigeria; Ikpoto Eseme; Iziaq Adeyanju; Lawrence Adegbeingbe; Samson Oyeledun	39.15	Canada; Tony Sharpe; Ben Johnson; Desai Williams; Mark McKoy	39.30	Scotland; Allan Wells; Drew McMaster; Gus McCuaig; Cameron Sharp	39.33
1986	Canada; Mark McKoy; Atlee Mahorn; Desai Williams; Ben Johnson	39.15	England; Lincoln Asquith; Daley Thompson; Mike McFarlane; Clarence Callender	39.19	Scotland; Jamie Henderson; Cameron Sharp; George McCallum; Elliot Bunney	40.41
1990	England; Clarence Callender; John Regis; Marcus Adam; Linford Christie	38.67	Nigeria; Victor Nwankwo; Davidson Ezinwa; Osmond Ezinwa; Abdullahi Tetengi	38.85	Jamaica; Wayne Watson; John Mair; Clive Wright; Ray Stewart	39.11
1994	Canada; Donovan Bailey; Glenroy Gilbert; Carlton Chambers; Bruny Surin	38.39 GR	Australia; Shane Naylor; Paul Henderson; Tim Jackson; Damien Marsh	38.88	England; Jason John; Philip Goedluck; Toby Box; Terry Williams	39.39
1998	England; Dwain Chambers; Marlon Devonish; Julian Golding; Darren Campbell	38.20 GR	Canada; Bradley McCuaig; Glenroy Gilbert; O'Brian Gibbons; Trevino Betty	38.46	Australia; Gavin Hunter; Darryl Wohlsen; Steve Brimacombe; Matt Shirvington	38.69
2002	England; Jason Gardener; Marlon Devonish; Allyn Condon; Darren Campbell	38.62	Jamaica; Michael Frater; Dwight Thomas; Christopher Williams; Asafa Powell	38.62	Australia; Tim Williams; Paul Di Bella; David Baxter; Patrick Johnson	38.87
2006	Jamaica; Michael Frater; Ainsley Waugh; Chris Williams; Asafa Powell	38.36	South Africa; Lee-Roy Newton; Leigh Julius; Snyman Prinsloo; Sherwin Vries	38.98	Canada; Charles Allen; Anson Henry; Nathan Taylor; E. J. Parris	39.21
2010	England; Ryan Scott; Leon Baptiste; Marlon Devonish; Mark Lewis-Francis	38.74	Jamaica; Lerone Clarke; Lansford Spence; Rasheed Dwyer; Remaldo Rose	38.79	India; Rahamatulla Molla; Suresh Sathya; Shameer Mon; Md Abdul Najeeb Qureshi	38.89
2014	Jamaica; Jason Livermore; Kemar Bailey-Cole; Nickel Ashmeade; Usain Bolt	37.58 GR	England; Adam Gemili; Harry Aikines-Aryeetey; Richard Kilty; Daniel Talbot	38.02	Trinidad and Tobago; Keston Bledman; Marc Burns; Rondel Sorrillo; Richard Thompson	38.10
2018	England; Reuben Arthur; Zharnel Hughes; Richard Kilty; Harry Aikines-Aryeetey	38.13	South Africa; Henricho Bruintjies; Emile Erasmus; Anaso Jobodwana; Akani Simbine	38.24	Jamaica; Everton Clarke; Oshane Bailey; Warren Weir; Yohan Blake	38.35
2022	England; Jona Efoloko; Zharnel Hughes; Nethaneel Mitchell-Blake; Ojie Edoburun	38.35	Trinidad and Tobago; Jerod Elcock; Eric Harrison Jr. Kion Benjamin; Kyle Greaux	38.70	Nigeria; Udodi Onwuzurike; Favour Ashe; Alaba Akintola; Raymond Ekevwo	38.81

=== 4 x 400 metres relay ===
Games	Gold		Silver		Bronze	
1970	Kenya; Munyoro Nyamau; Julius Sang; Robert Ouko; Charles Asati	3:03.63	Trinidad and Tobago; Mel Wong Shing; Ben Cayenne; Kent Bernard; Edwin Roberts	3:05.49	England; Martin Bilham; Len Walters; Mike Hauck; John Sherwood	3:05.53
1974	Kenya; Charles Asati; Francis Musyoki; Julius Sang; Bill Koskei	3:04.43	England; Alan Pascoe; Andy Carter; John Wilson; Bill Hartley	3:06.66	Uganda; Pius Olowo; Samuel Kakonge; Silver Ayoo; William Dralu	3:07.45
1978	Kenya; Daniel Kimaiyo; Joel Ngetich; Washington Njiri; Bill Koskei	3:03.54	Jamaica; Bert Cameron; Clive Barriffe; Colin Bradford; Floyd Brown	3:04.00	Australia; Chum Darvall; Garry Brown; John Higham; Rick Mitchell	3:04.23
1982	England; Garry Cook; Phil Brown; Steve Scutt; Todd Bennett	3:05.45	Australia; Gary Minihan; Greg Parker; John Fleming; Rick Mitchell	3:05.82	Kenya; Elisha Bitok; James Maina Boi; John Anzrah; Juma Ndiwa	3:06:33
1986	England; Kriss Akabusi; Phil Brown; Roger Black; Todd Bennett	3:07.19	Australia; Darren Clark; David Johnston; Bruce Frayne; Miles Murphy	3:07.81	Canada; Andre Smith; Anton Skerritt; Atlee Mahorn; John Graham	3:08.69
1990	Kenya; David Kitur; Samson Kitur; Simeon Kipkemboi; Stephen Mwanzia	3:02.48 GR	Scotland; Mark Davidson; David Strang; Tom McKean; Brian Whittle	3:04.68	Jamaica; Clive Wright; Devon Morris; Trevor Graham; Howard Burnett	3:04.96
1994	England; David McKenzie; Peter Crampton; Adrian Patrick; Du'aine Ladejo	3:02.14 GR	Jamaica; Orville Taylor; Dennis Blake; Linval Laird; Garth Robinson	3:02.32	Trinidad and Tobago; Patrick Delice; Neil de Silva; Hayden Stephen; Ian Morris	3:02.78
1998	Jamaica; Davian Clarke; Greg Haughton; Michael McDonald; Roxbert Martin	2:59.03 GR	England; Mark Richardson; Mark Hylton; Paul Slythe; Solomon Wariso	3:00.82	Wales; Iwan Thomas; Jamie Baulch; Matthew Elias; Paul Gray	3:01.86
2002	England; Jared Deacon, Sean Baldock, Chris Rawlinson, Daniel Caines	3:00.40	Wales; Timothy Benjamin, Iwan Thomas, Jamie Baulch, Matthew Elias	3:00.41	Bahamas; Chris Brown, Troy McIntosh, Dominic Demeritte, Timothy Munnings	3:01.35
2006	Australia (AUS); John Steffensen; Chris Troode; Mark Ormrod; Clinton Hill	3:00.93	South Africa (RSA); Jan van der Merwe; Ofentse Mogawane; Paul Gorries; L. J. van Zyl	3:01.84	Jamaica (JAM); Lansford Davis; Davian Clarke; Lansford Spence; Jermaine Gonzales	3:01.94
2010	Australia (AUS); Joel Milburn; Kevin Moore; Brendan Cole; Sean Wroe	3:03.30	Kenya (KEN); Vincent Kiplangat Kosgei; Vincent Mumo Kiilu; Anderson Mutegi; Mark Mutai	3:03.84	England (ENG); Conrad Williams; Nick Leavey; Richard Yates; Robert Tobin	3:03.97
2014	England; Conrad Williams; Michael Bingham; Daniel Awde; Matthew Hudson-Smith	3:00.46	Bahamas; LaToy Williams; Michael Mathieu; Alonzo Russell; Chris Brown	3:00.51	Trinidad and Tobago; Lalonde Gordon; Jarrin Solomon; Renny Quow; Zwede Hewitt	3:01.51
2018	Botswana; Leaname Maotoanong; Baboloki Thebe; Onkabetse Nkobolo; Isaac Makwala	3:01.78	Bahamas; O'Jay Ferguson; Teray Smith; Stephen Newbold; Alonzo Russell	3:01.92	Jamaica; Jermaine Gayle; Demish Gaye; Jamari Rose; Javon Francis	3:01.97
2022	Trinidad and Tobago; Dwight St. Hillaire; Asa Guevara; Machel Cedenio; Jereem Richards	3:01.29	Botswana; Leungo Scotch; Zibane Ngozi; Anthony Pesela; Bayapo Ndori	3:01.85	Kenya; Wiseman Mukhobe; Mike Nyang'au; William Rayian; Boniface Mweresa	3:02.41

=== Marathon ===
Games	Gold		Silver		Bronze	
1930	Dunky Wright; Scotland	2:43:43	Sam Ferris; England	2:47.13e	Johnny Miles; Canada	2:48:23e
1934	Harold Webster; Canada	2:40:36	Donald Robertson; Scotland	2:45:08	Dunky Wright; Scotland	2:56:20
1938	Johannes Coleman; South Africa	2:30:15	Bert Norris; England	2:37:57	Jackie Gibson; South Africa	2:38:20
1950	Jack Holden; England	2:32:57 GR	Syd Luyt; South Africa	2:37:03	Jack Clarke; New Zealand	2:39:27
1954	Joe McGhee; Scotland	2:39:36	Jackie Mekler; South Africa	2:40:57	Jan Barnard; South Africa	2:51:50
1958	Dave Power; Australia	2:22:46	Jan Barnard; South Africa	2:22:58	Peter Wilkinson; England	2:24:42
1962	Brian Kilby; England	2:21:17	Dave Power; Australia	2:22:16	Rod Bonella; Australia	2:24:07
1966	Jim Alder; Scotland	2:22:08	Bill Adcocks; England	2:22:13	Mike Ryan; New Zealand	2:27:59
1970	Ron Hill; England	2:09:28	Jim Alder; Scotland	2:12:04	Don Faircloth; England	2:12:19
1974	Ian Thompson; England	2:09:12 GR	Jack Foster; New Zealand	2:11:19	Richard Mabuza; Eswatini	2:12:55
1978	Gidamis Shahanga; Tanzania	2:15:40	Jerome Drayton; Canada	2:16:14	Paul Bannon; Canada	2:16:52
1982	Robert de Castella; Australia	2:09:18	Juma Ikangaa; Tanzania	2:09:30	Mike Gratton; England	2:12:06
1986	Robert de Castella; Australia	2:10:15	Dave Edge; Canada	2:11:08	Steve Moneghetti; Australia	2:11:18
1990	Douglas Wakiihuri; Kenya	2:10:27	Steve Moneghetti; Australia	2:10:34	Simon Robert Naali; Tanzania	2:10:38
1994	Steve Moneghetti; Australia	2:11:49	Sean Quilty; Australia	2:14:57	Mark Hudspith; England	2:15:11
1998	Thabiso Moqhali; Lesotho	2:19.15	Simon Mrashani; Tanzania	2:19.42	Andea Geway Suja; Tanzania	2:19.50
2002	Francis Robert Naali; Tanzania	2:11.58	Joshua Chelanga; Kenya	2:12.44	Andrew Letherby; Australia	2:13.23
2006	Samson Ramadhani; Tanzania	2:11:29	Fred Tumbo; Kenya	2:12:03	Dan Robinson; England	2:14:50
2010	John Kelai; Kenya	2:14:35	Michael Shelley; Australia	2:15:28	Amos Tirop Matui; Kenya	2:15:58
2014	Michael Shelley; Australia	2:11:15	Stephen Kwelio Chemlany; Kenya	2:11:58	Abraham Kiplimo; Uganda	2:12:23
2018	Michael Shelley; Australia	2:16:46	Solomon Mutai; Uganda	2:19:02	Robbie Simpson; Scotland	2:19:36
2022	Victor Kiplangat; Uganda	2:10:55	Alphonce Simbu; Tanzania	2:12:29	Michael Mugo Githae; Kenya	2:13:16

=== 10 km walk ===
Games	Gold		Silver		Bronze	
2022	Evan Dunfee; Canada	38:36.37 GR	Declan Tingay; Australia	38:42.33	Sandeep Kumar; India	38:49.21

=== High jump ===
Games	Gold		Silver		Bronze	
1930	Johannes Viljoen; South Africa	1.905 m	Colin Gordon; British Guiana	1.88 m	William Stargratt; Canada	1.855 m
1934	Edwin Thacker; South Africa	1.90 m	Joe Haley; Canada	1.90 m	John Michie; Scotland	1.90 m
1938	Edwin Thacker; South Africa	1.96 m	Robert Heffernan; Australia	1.88 m	Doug Shetliffe; Australia	1.88 m
1950	John Winter; Australia	1.98 m GR	Josiah Majekodunmi; Nigeria; Alan Paterson; Scotland	1.95 m	None awarded	
1954	Emmanuel Ifeajuna; Nigeria	2.03 m GR	Patrick Etolu; Uganda	1.99 m	Nafiu Osagie; Nigeria	1.99 m
1958	Ernle Haisley; Jamaica	2.06 m	Chilla Porter; Australia	2.03 m	Robert Kotei; Ghana	2.00 m
1962	Percy Hobson; Australia	2.11 m GR	Chilla Porter; Australia	2.08 m	Anton Norris; Barbados	2.03 m
1966	Lawrie Peckham; Australia	2.08 m	Samuel Igun; Nigeria	2.03 m	Anton Norris; Barbados	2.00 m
1970	Lawrie Peckham; Australia	2.14 m	John Hawkins; Canada	2.12 m	Sheikh Faye; Gambia	2.10 m
1974	Gordon Windeyer; Australia	2.16 m	Lawrie Peckham; Australia	2.14 m	Claude Ferragne; Canada	2.12 m
1978	Claude Ferragne; Canada	2.20 m	Greg Joy; Canada	2.18 m	Dean Bauck; Canada; Brian Burgess; Scotland	2.15 m
1982	Milton Ottey; Canada	2.31 m	Steve Wray; Bahamas	2.31 m	Clarence Saunders; Bermuda	2.19 m
1986	Milton Ottey; Canada	2.30 m	Geoff Parsons; Scotland	2.28 m	Alain Metellus; Canada; Henderson Pierre; England	2.14 m
1990	Clarence Saunders; Bermuda	2.36 m GR	Dalton Grant; England	2.34 m	Milton Ottey; Canada; Geoff Parsons; Scotland	2.23 m
1994	Tim Forsyth; Australia	2.32 m	Steve Smith; England	2.32 m	Geoff Parsons; Scotland	2.31 m
1998	Dalton Grant; England	2.31 m	Ben Challenger; England	2.28 m	Tim Forsyth; Australia	2.28 m
2002	Mark Boswell; Canada	2.28 m	Kwaku Boateng; Canada	2.25 m	Ben Challenger; England	2.25 m
2006	Mark Boswell; Canada	2.26 m	Martyn Bernard; England	2.26 m	Kyriakos Ioannou; Cyprus	2.23 m
2010	Donald Thomas; Bahamas	2.32 m	Trevor Barry; Bahamas	2.29 m	Kabelo Kgosiemang; Botswana	2.26 m
2014	Derek Drouin; Canada	2.31 m	Kyriakos Ioannou; Cyprus	2.28 m	Michael Mason; Canada	2.25 m
2018	Brandon Starc; Australia	2.32 m	Jamal Wilson; Bahamas	2.30 m	Django Lovett; Canada	2.30 m
2022	Hamish Kerr; New Zealand	2.25 m	Brandon Starc; Australia	2.25 m	Tejaswin Shankar; India	2.22 m

=== Pole vault ===
Games	Gold		Silver		Bronze	
1930	Victor Pickard; Canada	3.73 m	Howard Ford; England	3.73 m	Robert Stoddard; Canada	3.655 m
1934	Syl Apps; Canada	3.88 m	Alf Gilbert; Canada	3.81 m	Fred Woodhouse; Australia	3.66 m
1938	Andries du Plessis; South Africa	4.11 m	Les Fletcher; Australia	3.97 m	Stuart Frid; Canada	3.88 m
1950	Tim Anderson; England	3.97 m	Stan Egerton; Canada	3.97 m	Peter Denton; Australia	3.88 m
1954	Geoff Elliott; England	4.26 m GR	Ron Miller; Canada	4.20 m	Andries Burger; South Africa	4.13 m
1958	Geoff Elliott; England	4.16 m	Robert Reid; Canada	4.16 m	Merv Richards; New Zealand	4.16 m
1962	Trevor Bickle; Australia	4.50 m	Danie Burger; Rhodesia and Nyasaland	4.42 m	Ross Filshie; Australia	4.42 m
1966	Trevor Bickle; Australia	4.80 m	Mike Bull; Northern Ireland	4.72 m	Gerry Moro; Canada	4.65 m
1970	Mike Bull; Northern Ireland	5.10 m	Alan Kane; Canada	4.90 m	Robert Raftis; Canada	4.90 m
1974	Don Baird; Australia	5.05 m	Mike Bull; Northern Ireland	5.00 m	Brian Hooper; England	5.00 m
1978	Bruce Simpson; Canada	5.10 m	Don Baird; Australia	5.10 m	Brian Hooper; England	5.00 m
1982	Ray Boyd; Australia	5.20 m	Jeff Gutteridge; England	5.20 m	Graham Eggleton; Scotland	5.20 m
1986	Andy Ashurst; England	5.30 m	Bob Ferguson; Canada	5.20 m	Neil Honey; Australia	5.20 m
1990	Simon Arkell; Australia	5.35 m	Ian Tullett; England	5.25 m	Simon Poelman; New Zealand	5.20 m
1994	Neil Winter; Wales	5.40 m	Curtis Heywood; Canada	5.30 m	James Miller; Australia	5.30 m
1998	Riaan Botha; South Africa	5.60 m	Paul Burgess; Australia	5.50 m	Jean-Kersley Gardenne; Mauritius	5.35 m
2002	Okkert Brits; South Africa	5.75 m	Paul Burgess; Australia	5.70 m	Dominic Johnson; Saint Lucia	5.60 m
2006	Steve Hooker; Australia	5.80 m GR	Dmitri Markov; Australia	5.60 m	Steven Lewis; England	5.50 m
2010	Steve Hooker; Australia	5.60 m	Steven Lewis; England	5.60 m	Max Eaves; England	5.40 m
2014	Steven Lewis; England	5.55 m	Luke Cutts; England	5.55 m	Shawnacy Barber; Canada	5.45 m
2018	Kurtis Marschall; Australia	5.70 m	Shawnacy Barber; Canada	5.65 m	Luke Cutts; England	5.45 m
2022	Kurtis Marschall; Australia	5.70 m	Adam Hague; England	5.55 m	Harry Coppell; England	5.50 m

=== Long jump ===
Games	Gold		Silver		Bronze	
1930	Len Hutton; Canada	7.20 m	Reg Revans; England	6.86 m	Johannes Viljoen; South Africa	6.86 m
1934	Sam Richardson; Canada	7.17 m	Johann Luckhoff; South Africa	7.10 m	Jack Metcalfe; Australia	6.93 m
1938	Harold Brown; Canada	7.43 m	Jim Panton; Canada	7.25 m	Basil Dickinson; Australia	7.15 m
1950	Neville Price; South Africa	7.31 m	Bevin Hough; New Zealand	7.20 m	David Dephoff; New Zealand	7.08 m
1954	Ken Wilmshurst; England	7.54 m GR	Karim Olowu; Nigeria	7.39 m	Sylvanus Williams; Nigeria	7.22 m
1958	Paul Foreman; Jamaica	7.47 m	Deryck Taylor; Jamaica	7.47 m	Muhammad Ramzan Ali; Pakistan	7.33 m
1962	Michael Ahey; Ghana	8.05 m	Dave Norris; New Zealand	7.74 m	Wellesley Clayton; Jamaica	7.73 m
1966	Lynn Davies; Wales	7.99 m	John Morbey; Bermuda	7.89 m	Wellesley Clayton; Jamaica	7.83 m
1970	Lynn Davies; Wales	8.06 m (w)	Phil May; Australia	7.94 m (w)	Alan Lerwill; England	7.94 m (w)
1974	Alan Lerwill; England	7.94 m	Chris Commons; Australia	7.92 m	Joshua Owusu; Ghana	7.75 m
1978	Roy Mitchell; England	8.06 m (w)	Chris Commons; Australia	8.04 m (w)	Suresh Babu; India	7.94 m (w)
1982	Gary Honey; Australia	8.08 m	Steve Hanna; Bahamas	7.79 m	Steve Walsh; New Zealand	7.75 m
1986	Gary Honey; Australia	8.08 m	Fred Salle; England	7.83 m	Kyle McDuffie; Canada	7.79 m
1990	Yusuf Alli; Nigeria	8.39 m (w)	Dave Culbert; Australia	8.20 m (w)	Festus Igbinoghene; Nigeria	8.18 m (w)
1994	Obinna Eregbu; Nigeria	8.05 m	Dave Culbert; Australia	8.00 m	Ian James; Canada	7.93 m
1998	Peter Burge; Australia	8.22 m	Jai Taurima; Australia	8.22 m	Wendell Williams; Trinidad and Tobago	7.95 m
2002	Nathan Morgan; England	8.02 m	Gable Garenamotse; Botswana	7.91 m	Kareem Streete-Thompson; Cayman Islands	7.89 m
2006	Ignisious Gaisah; Ghana	8.20 m	Gable Garenamotse; Botswana	8.17 m	Fabrice Lapierre; Australia	8.10 m
2010	Fabrice Lapierre; Australia	8.30 m	Greg Rutherford; England	8.22 m	Ignisious Gaisah; Ghana	8.12 m
2014	Greg Rutherford; England	8.20 m	Zarck Visser; South Africa	8.12 m	Ruswahl Samaai; South Africa	8.08 m
2018	Luvo Manyonga; South Africa	8.41 m GR	Henry Frayne; Australia	8.33 m	Ruswahl Samaai; South Africa	8.22 m
2022	LaQuan Nairn; Bahamas	8.08 m	Murali Sreeshankar; India	8.08 m	Jovan van Vuuren; South Africa	8.06 m

=== Triple jump ===
Games	Gold		Silver		Bronze	
1930	Gordon Smallacombe; Canada	14.755 m	Reg Revans; England	14.29 m	Len Hutton; Canada	13.90 m
1934	Jack Metcalfe; Australia	15.63 m	Sam Richardson; Canada	14.65 m	Harold Brainsby; New Zealand	14.62 m
1938	Jack Metcalfe; Australia	15.49 m	Lloyd Miller; Australia	15.41 m	Basil Dickinson; Australia	15.28 m
1950	Brian Oliver; Australia	15.61 m	Les McKeand; Australia	15.28 m	Ian Polmear; Australia	14.67 m
1954	Ken Wilmshurst; England	15.28 m	Peter Esiri; Nigeria	15.25 m	Brian Oliver; Australia	15.14 m
1958	Ian Tomlinson; Australia	15.74 m (w)	Jack Smyth; Canada	15.69 m	Dave Norris; New Zealand	15.45 m
1962	Ian Tomlinson; Australia	16.21 m	John Baguley; Australia	16.08 m	Fred Alsop; England	16.03 m
1966	Samuel Igun; Nigeria	16.40 m (w)	George Ogan; Nigeria	16.08 m	Fred Alsop; England	15.96 m
1970	Phil May; Australia	16.72 m	Mick McGrath; Australia	16.41 m	Mohinder Singh Gill; India	15.90 m
1974	Joshua Owusu; Ghana	16.5 m	Mohinder Singh Gill; India	16.44 m	Moise Pomaney; Ghana	16.23 m
1978	Keith Connor; England	17.21 m (w)	Ian Campbell; Australia	16.93 m (w)	Aston Moore; England	16.69 m
1982	Keith Connor; England	17.81 m	Ken Lorraway; Australia	17.54 m	Aston Moore; England	16.76 m
1986	John Herbert; England	17.27 m	Mike Makin; England	16.87 m	Peter Beames; Australia	16.42 m
1990	Marios Hadjiandreou; Cyprus	16.95 m	Jonathan Edwards; England	16.93 m	Edrick Floréal; Canada	16.89 m
1994	Julian Golley; England	17.03 m	Jonathan Edwards; England	17.00 m	Brian Wellman; Bermuda	17.00 m
1998	Onochie Achike; England	17.10 m	Andrew Owusu; Ghana	17.03 m	Remmy Limo; Kenya	16.89 m
2002	Jonathan Edwards; England	17.86 m GR	Phillips Idowu; England	17.68 m	Leevan Sands; Bahamas	17.26 m
2006	Phillips Idowu; England	17.45 m	Godfrey Khotso Mokoena; South Africa	16.95 m	Alwyn Jones; Australia	16.75 m
2010	Tosin Oke; Nigeria	17.16 m	Hugo Mamba-Schlick; Cameroon	17.14 m	Renjith Maheshwary; India	17.07 m
2014	Godfrey Khotso Mokoena; South Africa	17.20 m	Tosin Oke; Nigeria	16.84 m	Arpinder Singh; India	16.63 m
2018	Troy Doris; Guyana	16.88 m	Yordanys Durañona; Dominica	16.86 m	Marcel Mayack; Cameroon	16.80 m
2022	Eldhose Paul; India	17.03 m	Abdulla Aboobacker; India	17.02 m	Jah-Nhai Perinchief; Bermuda	16.92 m

=== Shot put ===
Games	Gold		Silver		Bronze	
1930	Harry Hart; South Africa	14.58 m	Robert Howland; England	13.46 m	Charles Hermann; Canada	12.98 m
1934	Harry Hart; South Africa	14.67 m	Robert Howland; England	13.53 m	Kenneth Pridie; England	13.43 m
1938	Louis Fouché; South Africa	14.47 m	Eric Coy; Canada	13.96 m	Francis Drew; Australia	13.8 m
1950	Mataika Tuicakau; Fiji	14.64 m	Harold Moody; England	13.92 m	Leo Roininen; Canada	13.68 m
1954	John Savidge; England	16.77 m GR	John Pavelich; Canada	14.95 m	Fanie du Plessis; South Africa	14.93 m
1958	Arthur Rowe; England	17.57 m	Martyn Lucking; England	16.50 m	Barry Donath; Australia	15.79 m
1962	Martyn Lucking; England	18.08 m	Mike Lindsay; Scotland	18.05 m	Dave Steen; Canada	17.90 m
1966	Dave Steen; Canada	18.79 m	Les Mills; New Zealand	18.37 m	George Puce; Canada	17.14 m
1970	Dave Steen; Canada	19.21 m	Jeff Teale; England	18.43 m	Les Mills; New Zealand	18.40 m
1974	Geoff Capes; England	20.74 m	Mike Winch; England	19.36 m	Bruce Pirnie; Canada	18.68 m
1978	Geoff Capes; England	19.77 m	Bruno Pauletto; Canada	19.33 m	Bishop Dolegiewicz; Canada	18.45 m
1982	Bruno Pauletto; Canada	19.55 m	Mike Winch; England	19.36 m	Luby Chambul; Canada	17.46 m
1986	Billy Cole; England	18.16 m	Joe Quigley; Australia	17.97 m	Stuart Gyngell; Australia	17.70 m
1990	Simon Williams; England	18.54 m	Adewale Olukoju; Nigeria	18.48 m	Paul Edwards; Wales	18.17 m
1994	Matt Simson; England	19.49 m	Courtney Ireland; New Zealand	19.38 m	Chima Ugwu; Nigeria	19.26 m
1998	Burger Lambrechts; South Africa	20.01 m	Mikhalis Louka; Cyprus	19.52 m	Shaun Pickering; Wales	19.33 m
2002	Justin Anlezark; Australia	20.91 m GR	Janus Robberts; South Africa	19.97 m	Carl Myerscough; England	19.91 m
2006	Janus Robberts; South Africa	19.76 m	Dorian Scott; Jamaica	19.75 m	Scott Martin; Australia	19.48 m
2010	Dylan Armstrong; Canada	21.02 m GR	Dorian Scott; Jamaica	20.19 m	Dale Stevenson; Australia	19.99 m
2014	O'Dayne Richards; Jamaica	21.61 m GR	Tom Walsh; New Zealand	21.19 m	Tim Nedow; Canada	20.59 m
2018	Tom Walsh; New Zealand	21.41 m	Chukwuebuka Enekwechi; Nigeria	21.14 m	Tim Nedow; Canada	20.91 m
2022	Tom Walsh; New Zealand	22.26 m	Jacko Gill; New Zealand	21.90 m	Scott Lincoln; England	20.57 m

=== Discus throw ===
Games	Gold		Silver		Bronze	
1930	Harry Hart; South Africa	41.425 m	Charles Hermann; Canada	41.22 m	Abe Zvonkin; Canada	41.17 m
1934	Harry Hart; South Africa	41.53 m	Douglas Bell; England	40.44 m	Bernard Prendergast; Jamaica	40.23 m
1938	Eric Coy; Canada	44.75 m	David Young; Scotland	43.04 m	George Sutherland; Canada	41.47 m
1950	Ian Reed; Australia	47.72 m GR	Mataika Tuicakau; Fiji	44.00 m	Svein Sigfusson; Canada	43.48 m
1954	Fanie du Plessis; South Africa	51.70 m GR	Roy Pella; Canada	49.53 m	Mark Pharaoh; England	47.84 m
1958	Fanie du Plessis; South Africa	55.94 m	Les Mills; New Zealand	51.73 m	Gerry Carr; England	51.63 m
1962	Warwick Selvey; Australia	56.48 m	Mike Lindsay; Scotland	52.58 m	John Sheldrick; England	50.67 m
1966	Les Mills; New Zealand	56.18 m	George Puce; Canada	55.94 m	Robin Tait; New Zealand	55.02 m
1970	George Puce; Canada	59.02 m	Les Mills; New Zealand	57.84 m	Bill Tancred; England	56.68 m
1974	Robin Tait; New Zealand	63.08 m	Bill Tancred; England	59.48 m	John Hillier; England	57.22 m
1978	Borys Chambul; Canada	59.70 m	Bradley Cooper; Bahamas	57.30 m	Rob Gray; Canada	55.48 m
1982	Bradley Cooper; Bahamas	64.04 m	Rob Gray; Canada	60.66 m	Bishop Dolegiewicz; Canada	60.34 m
1986	Ray Lazdins; Canada	58.86 m	Paul Nandapi; Australia	57.74 m	Werner Reiterer; Australia	57.34 m
1990	Adewale Olukoju; Nigeria	62.62 m	Werner Reiterer; Australia	61.56 m	Paul Nandapi; Australia	59.94 m
1994	Werner Reiterer; Australia	62.76 m	Adewale Olukoju; Nigeria	62.46 m	Robert Weir; England	60.86 m
1998	Robert Weir; England	64.42 m	Frantz Kruger; South Africa	63.93 m	Jason Tunks; Canada	62.22 m
2002	Frantz Kruger; South Africa	66.39 m GR	Jason Tunks; Canada	62.61 m	Robert Weir; England	59.24 m
2006	Scott Martin; Australia	63.48 m	Jason Tunks; Canada	63.07 m	Dariusz Slowik; Canada	61.49 m
2010	Benn Harradine; Australia	65.45 m	Vikas Gowda; India	63.69 m	Carl Myerscough; England	60.64 m
2014	Vikas Gowda; India	63.64 m	Apostolos Parellis; Cyprus	63.32 m	Jason Morgan; Jamaica	62.34 m
2018	Fedrick Dacres; Jamaica	68.20 m GR	Traves Smikle; Jamaica	63.98 m	Apostolos Parellis; Cyprus	63.61 m
2022	Matthew Denny; Australia	67.26 m	Lawrence Okoye; England	64.99 m	Traves Smikle; Jamaica	64.58 m

=== Hammer throw ===
Games	Gold		Silver		Bronze	
1930	Malcolm Nokes; England	47.12 m	Bill Britton; Ireland	46.89 m	John Cameron; Canada	44.45 m
1934	Malcolm Nokes; England	48.25 m	George Sutherland; Canada	46.24 m	William Mackenzie; Scotland	42.49 m
1938	George Sutherland; Canada	48.71 m	Keith Pardon; Australia	45.11 m	Jim Leckie; New Zealand	44.21 m
1950	Duncan Clark; Scotland	49.94 m GR	Keith Pardon; Australia	47.83 m	Herb Barker; Australia	45.62 m
1954	Muhammad Iqbal; Pakistan	55.37 m GR	Jakobus Dreyer; South Africa	54.75 m	Ewan Douglas; Scotland	52.81 m
1958	Mike Ellis; England	62.9 m	Muhammad Iqbal; Pakistan	61.7 m	Peter Allday; England	57.58 m
1962	Howard Payne; England	61.65 m	Dick Leffler; Australia	59.83 m	Robert Brown; Australia	57.65 m
1966	Howard Payne; England	61.98 m	Praveen Kumar; India	60.12 m	Muhammad Iqbal; Pakistan	59.56 m
1970	Howard Payne; England	67.80 m	Bruce Fraser; England	62.90 m	Barry Williams; England	61.58 m
1974	Ian Chipchase; England	69.56 m	Howard Payne; England	68.02 m	Peter Farmer; Australia	67.48 m
1978	Peter Farmer; Australia	71.10 m	Scott Neilson; Canada	69.92 m	Chris Black; Scotland	68.14 m
1982	Robert Weir; England	75.08 m	Martin Girvan; Northern Ireland	73.62 m	Chris Black; Scotland	69.84 m
1986	Dave Smith; England	74.06 m	Martin Girvan; Northern Ireland	70.48 m	Phil Spivey; Australia	70.30 m
1990	Sean Carlin; Australia	75.66 m	Dave Smith; England	73.52 m	Angus Cooper; New Zealand	71.26 m
1994	Sean Carlin; Australia	73.48 m	Paul Head; England	70.18 m	Peter Vivian; England	69.80 m
1998	Stuart Rendell; Australia	74.71 m	Mick Jones; England	74.02 m	Chris Harmse; South Africa	72.83 m
2002	Mick Jones; England	72.55 m	Philip Jensen; New Zealand	69.48 m	Paul Head; England	68.60 m
2006	Stuart Rendell; Australia	77.53 m GR	Jim Steacy; Canada	74.75 m	Chris Harmse; South Africa	73.81 m
2010	Chris Harmse; South Africa	73.12 m	Alex Smith; England	72.95 m	Mike Floyd; England	69.34 m
2014	Jim Steacy; Canada	74.16 m	Nick Miller; England	72.99 m	Mark Dry; Scotland	71.64 m
2018	Nick Miller; England	80.26 m GR	Matthew Denny; Australia	74.88 m	Mark Dry; Scotland	73.12 m
2022	Nick Miller; England	76.43 m	Ethan Katzberg; Canada	76.36 m	Alexandros Poursanidis; Cyprus	73.97 m

=== Javelin throw ===
Games	Gold		Silver		Bronze	
1930	Stan Lay; New Zealand	63.13 m	Doral Pilling; Canada	55.93 m	Harry Hart; South Africa	53.21 m
1934	Bob Dixon; Canada	60.02 m	Harry Hart; South Africa	58.27 m	Johann Luckhoff; South Africa	56.49 m
1938	Jim Courtright; Canada	62.8 m	Stan Lay; New Zealand	62.21 m	Jack Metcalfe; Australia	55.5 m
1950	Leo Roininen; Canada	57.11 m	Luke Tunabuna; Fiji	56.02 m	Doug Robinson; Canada	55.60 m
1954	James Achurch; Australia	68.52 m GR	Muhammad Nawaz; Pakistan	68.09 m	Jalal Khan; Pakistan	67.50 m
1958	Colin Smith; England	71.29 m	Jalal Khan; Pakistan	70.83 m	Hans Moks; Canada	70.41 m
1962	Alf Mitchell; Australia	78.11 m GR	Colin Smith; England	77.94 m	Nick Birks; Australia	75.07 m
1966	John FitzSimons; England	79.78 m	Nick Birks; Australia	76.16 m	Muhammad Nawaz; Pakistan	69.94 m
1970	Dave Travis; England	79.50 m	John McSorley; England	76.74 m	John FitzSimons; England	73.20 m
1974	Charles Clover; England	84.92 m	Dave Travis; England	79.92 m	John Mayaka; Kenya	77.56 m
1978	Phil Olsen; Canada	84.00 m	Mike O'Rourke; New Zealand	83.18 m	Peter Yates; England	78.58 m
1982	Mike O'Rourke; New Zealand	89.48 m GR	Laslo Babits; Canada	84.88 m	Zakayo Malekwa; Tanzania	80.22 m
1986	David Ottley; England	80.62 m GR	Mick Hill; England	78.56 m	Gavin Lovegrove; New Zealand	76.22 m
1990	Steve Backley; England	86.02 m GR	Mick Hill; England	83.32 m	Gavin Lovegrove; New Zealand	81.66 m
1994	Steve Backley; England	82.74 m	Mick Hill; England	81.84 m	Gavin Lovegrove; New Zealand	80.42 m
1998	Marius Corbett; South Africa	88.75 m GR	Steve Backley; England	87.38 m	Mick Hill; England	83.80 m
2002	Steve Backley; England	86.81 m	Scott Russell; Canada	78.98 m	Nick Nieland; England	78.63 m
2006	Nick Nieland; England	80.10 m	William Hamlyn-Harris; Australia	79.89 m	Oliver Dziubak; Australia	79.89 m
2010	Jarrod Bannister; Australia	81.71 m	Stuart Farquhar; New Zealand	78.15 m	Kashinath Naik; India	74.29 m
2014	Julius Yego; Kenya	83.87 m	Keshorn Walcott; Trinidad and Tobago	82.67 m	Hamish Peacock; Australia	81.75 m
2018	Neeraj Chopra; India	86.47 m	Hamish Peacock; Australia	82.59 m	Anderson Peters; Grenada	82.20 m
2022	Arshad Nadeem; Pakistan	90.18 m GR	Anderson Peters; Grenada	88.64 m	Julius Yego; Kenya	85.70 m

=== Decathlon ===
Games	Gold		Silver		Bronze	
1966	Roy Williams; New Zealand	7270 pts	Clive Longe; Wales	7123 pts	Gerry Moro; Canada	6983 pts
1970	Geoff Smith; Australia	7492 pts	Peter Gabbett; England	7469 pts	Barry King; England	7201 pts
1974	Mike Bull; Northern Ireland	7417 pts	Barry King; England	7277 pts	Rob Lethbridge; Australia	7270 pts
1978	Daley Thompson; England	8467 pts	Peter Hadfield; Australia	7623 pts	Alan Drayton; England	7484 pts
1982	Daley Thompson; England	8410 pts	Dave Steen; Canada	8004 pts	Fidelis Obikwu; England	7726 pts
1986	Daley Thompson; England	8663 pts GR	Dave Steen; Canada	8173 pts	Simon Poelman; New Zealand	8015 pts
1990	Mike Smith; Canada	8525 pts	Simon Poelman; New Zealand	8207 pts	Eugene Gilkes; England	7705 pts
1994	Mike Smith; Canada	8326 pts	Peter Winter; Australia	8074 pts	Simon Shirley; Australia	7980 pts
1998	Jagan Hames; Australia	8490 pts	Scott Ferrier; Australia	8307 pts	Mike Smith; Canada	8143 pts
2002	Claston Bernard; Jamaica	7830 pts	Matthew McEwen; Australia	7685 pts	Jamie Quarry; Scotland	7630 pts
2006	Dean Macey; England	8143 pts	Maurice Smith; Jamaica	8074 pts	Jason Dudley; Australia	8001 pts
2010	Jamie Adjetey-Nelson; Canada	8070 pts	Brent Newdick; New Zealand	7899 pts	Martin Brockman; England	7712 pts
2014	Damian Warner; Canada	8282 pts	Ashley Bryant; England	8109 pts	Kurt Felix; Grenada	8070 pts
2018	Lindon Victor; Grenada	8303 pts	Pierce LePage; Canada	8171 pts	Cedric Dubler; Australia	7983 pts
2022	Lindon Victor; Grenada	8233 pts	Daniel Golubovic; Australia	8197 pts	Cedric Dubler; Australia	8030 pts

== Disability events ==
=== 100 metres T12 ===
Games	Gold		Silver		Bronze	
2002	Adekunle Adesoji; Nigeria	10.76 s WR	Hisham Khaironi; Malaysia	11.53 s	Rory Field; South Africa	11.96 s
2006	Adekunle Adesoji; Nigeria	11.07 s	Hilton Langenhoven; South Africa	11.22 s	Eriyo Etinosa; Nigeria	11.43 s

=== 100 metres T37 ===
Games	Gold		Silver		Bronze	
2014	Fanie van der Merwe; South Africa	11.65 s	Charl du Toit; South Africa	11.89 s	Rhys Jones; Wales	12.04 s

=== 100 metres T46 ===
Games	Gold		Silver		Bronze	
2010	Simon Patmore; Australia	11.14 s	Samkelo Radebe; South Africa	11.25 s	Ayuba Abdullahi; Nigeria	11.37 s

=== 200 metres T46 ===
Games	Gold		Silver		Bronze	
2006	Heath Francis; Australia	22.96 s	David Roos; South Africa	23.12 s	Vitalis Lanshima; Nigeria	23.16 s

=== 800m wheelchair ===
Games	Gold		Silver		Bronze	
1994	Jeff Adams; Canada	1:44.94 GR	David Holding; England	1:45.13	Paul Wiggins; Australia	1:45.40

=== 1500 metres T54 ===
Games	Gold		Silver		Bronze	
2010	Kurt Fearnley; Australia	3:19.86	Richard Colman; Australia	3:20.90	Josh Cassidy; Canada	3:21.14
2014	David Weir; England	3:21.67	Kurt Fearnley; Australia	3:23.08	Alex Dupont; Canada	3:23.26

=== Marathon wheelchair ===
Games	Gold		Silver		Bronze	
1994	Paul Wiggins; Australia	1:37:33 GR	Ivan Newman; England	1:41:55	Ben Lucas; New Zealand	1:42:19

=== Shot put F32/34/52 ===
Games	Gold		Silver		Bronze	
2010	Kyle Pettey; Canada	1021 (11.44 m)	Dan West; England	969 (10.78 m)	Hamish MacDonald; Australia	889 (9.92 m)

=== Discus throw F42-44 ===
Games	Gold		Silver		Bronze	
2014	Dan Greaves; England	59.21 m	Aled Davies; Wales	46.83 m	Richard Okigbazi; Nigeria	39.38 m

=== Discus throw seated ===
Games	Gold		Silver		Bronze	
2006	Tanto Campbell; Jamaica	34.48 m	Jacques Martin; Canada	32.28 m	Ranjith Kumar Jayaseelan; India	29.88 m

== Discontinued events ==
=== 100 yards ===
Games	Gold		Silver		Bronze	
1930	Percy Williams; Canada	9.9	Ernie Page; England	10.2e	John Fitzpatrick; Canada	10.2e
1934	Arthur Sweeney; England	10.0	Marthinus Theunissen; South Africa	10.1e	Ian Young; Scotland	10.1e
1938	Cyril Holmes; England	9.7	John Mumford; Australia	9.8e	Ted Best; Australia	9.9e
1950	John Treloar; Australia	9.7 GR=	Bill de Gruchy; Australia	9.8	Don Pettie; Canada	9.9
1954	Mike Agostini; Trinidad and Tobago	9.6 GR	Don McFarlane; Canada	9.7	Hector Hogan; Australia	9.7
1958	Keith Gardner; Jamaica	9.66	Tom Robinson; Bahamas	9.69	Mike Agostini; Trinidad and Tobago	9.79
1962	Seraphino Antao; Kenya	9.50	Tom Robinson; Bahamas	9.63	Michael Cleary; Australia	9.78
1966	Harry Jerome; Canada	9.41 GR	Tom Robinson; Bahamas	9.44	Edwin Roberts; Trinidad and Tobago	9.52

=== 220 yards ===
Games	Gold		Silver		Bronze	
1930	Stanley Engelhart; England	21.8	John Fitzpatrick; Canada		Willie Walters; South Africa	
1934	Arthur Sweeney; England	21.9	Marthinus Theunissen; South Africa	22.0e	Walter Rangeley; England	22.1e
1938	Cyril Holmes; England	21.2	John Mumford; Australia	21.3e	Ted Best; Australia	21.4e
1950	John Treloar; Australia	21.5	David Johnson; Australia	21.8	Don Jowett; New Zealand	21.8
1954	Don Jowett; New Zealand	21.5	Brian Shenton; England	21.5	Ken Jones; Wales	21.9
1958	Tom Robinson; Bahamas	21.08	Keith Gardner; Jamaica	21.11	Gordon Day; South Africa	21.15
1962	Seraphino Antao; Kenya	21.28	Dave Jones; England	21.59	Johan Du Preez; Rhodesia and Nyasaland	21.70
1966	Stanley Allotey; Ghana	20.65 GR	Edwin Roberts; Trinidad and Tobago	20.93	David Ejoke; Nigeria	20.95

=== 440 yards ===
Games	Gold		Silver		Bronze	
1930	Alex Wilson; Canada	48.8	Willie Walters; South Africa	48.9e	George Golding; Australia	
1934	Godfrey Rampling; England	48.0	Bill Roberts; England	48.5e	Crew Stoneley; England	48.6e
1938	Bill Roberts; England	47.9	William Fritz; Canada	47.9e	Denis Shore; South Africa	48.1e
1950	Edwin Carr; Australia	47.9 GR=	Leslie Lewis; England	48.0	David Batten; New Zealand	48.8
1954	Kevan Gosper; Australia	47.2 GR	Don Jowett; New Zealand	47.4	Terry Tobacco; Canada	47.8
1958	Milkha Singh; India	46.71	Malcolm Spence; South Africa	46.9	Terry Tobacco; Canada	47.05
1962	George Kerr; Jamaica	46.74	Robbie Brightwell; England	46.86	Amos Omolo; Uganda	46.88
1966	Wendell Mottley; Trinidad and Tobago	45.08 GR	Kent Bernard; Trinidad and Tobago	46.06	Don Domansky; Canada	46.42

=== 880 yards ===
Games	Gold		Silver		Bronze	
1930	Tommy Hampson; England	1:52.4	Reg Thomas; England	1:55.5e	Alex Wilson; Canada	1:55.6e
1934	Phil Edwards; British Guiana	1:54	Willie Botha; South Africa	1:55.5e	Hamish Stothard; Scotland	1:55.6e
1938	Pat Boot; New Zealand	1:51.2	Frank Handley; England	1:54.0e	Bill Dale; Canada	1:54.2e
1950	John Parlett; England	1:53.1	Jack Hutchins; Canada	1:53.4	Bill Parnell; Canada	1:53.4
1954	Derek Johnson; England	1:50.7 GR	Brian Hewson; England	1:51.2	Ian Boyd; England	1:51.9
1958	Herb Elliott; Australia	1:49.32	Brian Hewson; England	1:49.47	Mike Rawson; England	1:50.94
1962	Peter Snell; New Zealand	1:47.64 GR	George Kerr; Jamaica	1:47.90	Tony Blue; Australia	1:48.99
1966	Noel Clough; Australia	1:46.9 GR	Wilson Kiprugut; Kenya	1:47.2	George Kerr; Jamaica	1:47.2

=== 1 mile ===
Games	Gold		Silver		Bronze	
1930	Reg Thomas; England	4:14.0	William Whyte; Australia	4:17.0e	Jerry Cornes; England	
1934	Jack Lovelock; New Zealand	4:13	Sydney Wooderson; England	4:13.4e	Jerry Cornes; England	4:16.6e
1938	Jim Alford; Wales	4:11.6	Gerald Backhouse; Australia	4:12.2e	Pat Boot; New Zealand	4:12.6e
1950	Bill Parnell; Canada	4:11.0 GR	Len Eyre; England	4:11.8	Maurice Marshall; New Zealand	4:13.2
1954	Roger Bannister; England	3:58.8 GR	John Landy; Australia	3:59.6	Rich Ferguson; Canada	4:04.6
1958	Herb Elliott; Australia	3:59.03	Merv Lincoln; Australia	4:01.80	Albie Thomas; Australia	4:02.77
1962	Peter Snell; New Zealand	4:04.58	John Davies; New Zealand	4:05.12	Terry Sullivan; Rhodesia and Nyasaland	4:06.61
1966	Kipchoge Keino; Kenya	3:55.34 GR	Alan Simpson; England	3:57.27	Ian Studd; New Zealand	3:58.61

=== 3 mile ===
Games	Gold		Silver		Bronze	
1930	Stan Tomlin; England	14:27.4	Alex Hillhouse; Australia	14:27.6e	Jack Winfield; England	14:29.0e
1934	Wally Beavers; England	14:33	Cyril Allen; England	14:38	Alec Burns; England	14:45
1938	Cecil Matthews; New Zealand	13.59.6	Peter Ward; England	14:05.4	Scotty Rankine; Canada	14:24.0e
1950	Len Eyre; England	14:23.6	Harold Nelson; New Zealand	14:27.8	Anthony Chivers; England	14:28.1
1954	Christopher Chataway; England	13:35.2 GR	Fred Green; England	13:37.2	Frank Sando; England	13:37.4
1958	Murray Halberg; New Zealand	13:14.96	Albie Thomas; Australia	13:24.37	Neville Scott; New Zealand	13:26.06
1962	Murray Halberg; New Zealand	13:34.15	Ron Clarke; Australia	13:35.92	Bruce Kidd; Canada	13:36.37
1966	Kipchoge Keino; Kenya	12:57.4 GR	Ron Clarke; Australia	12:59.2	Allan Rushmer; England	13:08.6

=== 6 mile ===
Games	Gold		Silver		Bronze	
1930	Billy Savidan; New Zealand	30:49.6	Ernie Harper; England	31:01.6e	Tom Evenson; England	
1934	Arthur Penny; England	31:01	Scotty Rankine; Canada	31:03e	Arthur Furze; England	31:04e
1938	Cecil Matthews; New Zealand	30:14.5	Scotty Rankine; Canada	+180 yd	Wally Hayward; South Africa	+250 yd
1950	Harold Nelson; New Zealand	30:29.6	Andrew Forbes; Scotland	30:31.9	Noel Taylor; New Zealand	30:31.9
1954	Peter Driver; England	29:09.4 GR	Frank Sando; England	29:10.0	Jim Peters; England	29:20.0
1958	Dave Power; Australia	28:48.16	John Merriman; Wales	28:48.84	Arere Anentia; Kenya	28:51.48
1962	Bruce Kidd; Canada	28:26.13 GR	Dave Power; Australia	28:33.53	John Merriman; Wales	28:40.26
1966	Naftali Temu; Kenya	27:14.21 GR	Ron Clarke; Australia	27:39.42	Jim Alder; Scotland	28:15.4

=== 120 yard hurdles ===
Games	Gold		Silver		Bronze	
1930	David Burghley; England	14.6	Howard Davies; South Africa	14.7e	Fred Gaby; England	
1934	Don Finlay; England	15.2	James Worrall; Canada	15.5e	Ashleigh Pilbrow; England	15.7e
1938	Tom Lavery; South Africa	14.0 (w)	Larry O'Connor; Canada	14.2e (w)	Sid Stenner; Australia	14.4e (w)
1950	Peter Gardner; Australia	14.3 GR	Ray Weinberg; Australia	14.4	Tom Lavery; South Africa	14.6
1954	Keith Gardner; Jamaica	14.2 GR	Chris Higham; England	14.9	Norman Williams; Canada	14.9
1958	Keith Gardner; Jamaica	14.20 (w) GR	Jacobus Swart; South Africa	14.30 (w)	Ghulam Raziq; Pakistan	14.32 (w)
1962	Ghulam Raziq; Pakistan	14.34	Dave Prince; Australia	14.48	Laurie Taitt; England	14.81
1966	David Hemery; England	14.1	Mike Parker; England	14.2	Ghulam Raziq; Pakistan	14.3

=== 440 yard hurdles ===
Games	Gold		Silver		Bronze	
1930	David Burghley; England	54.4	Roger Leigh-Wood; England	55.9e	Douglas Neame; England	
1934	Alan Hunter; Scotland	55.2	Charles Reilly; Australia	55.8e	Ralph Brown; England	56.0e
1938	John Loaring; Canada	52.9	John Park; Australia	54.6e	Alan McDougall; Australia	55.2e
1950	(Dominion of Ceylon) Duncan White (CEY)	52.5 GR	John Holland; New Zealand	52.7	Geoff Goodacre; Australia	53.1
1954	David Lean; Australia	52.4 GR	Harry Kane; England	53.3	Bob Shaw; Wales	53.3
1958	Gert Potgieter; South Africa	49.73 (WR) GR	David Lean; Australia	50.59	Bartonjo Rotich; Kenya	51.75
1962	Ken Roche; Australia	51.5	Kimaru Songok; Kenya	51.9	Benson Ishiepai; Uganda	52.3
1966	Ken Roche; Australia	50.95	Kingsley Agbabokha; Nigeria	51.46	Peter Warden; England	51.54

=== 20 km road walk ===
Games	Gold		Silver		Bronze	
1998	Nicholas A'Hern; Australia	1:24.59	Arturo Huerta; Canada	1:25.49	Nathan Deakes; Australia	1:26.06
2002	Nathan Deakes; Australia	1:25.35 GR	Luke Adams; Australia	1:26.03	David Kimutai; Kenya	1:28.20
2006	Nathan Deakes; Australia	1:19:55 GR	Luke Adams; Australia	1:21:38	Jared Tallent; Australia	1:23:32
2010	Jared Tallent; Australia	1:22:18	Luke Adams; Australia	1:22:41	Harminder Singh; India	1:23:27
2018	Dane Bird-Smith; Australia	1:19:34 GR	Tom Bosworth; England	1:19:38	Samuel Gathimba; Kenya	1:19:51

=== 20 mile road walk ===
Games	Gold		Silver		Bronze	
1966	Ron Wallwork; England	2:44:43	Ray Middleton; England	2:45:19	Norman Read; New Zealand	2:46:29
1970	Noel Freeman; Australia	2:33:33 GR	Bob Gardiner; Australia	2:35:55	Bill Sutherland; Scotland	2:37:24
1974	John Warhurst; England	2:35:23	Roy Thorpe; England	2:39:03	Peter Fullager; Australia	2:42:09

=== 30 km road walk ===
Games	Gold		Silver		Bronze	
1978	Olly Flynn; England	2:22:04	Willi Sawall; Australia	2:22:59	Tim Erickson; Australia	2:26:34
1982	Steve Barry; Wales	2:10:16	Marcel Jobin; Canada	2:12:24	Guillaume LeBlanc; Canada	2:14:56
1986	Simon Baker; Australia	2:07:47 GR	Guillaume LeBlanc; Canada	2:08:38	Ian McCombie; England	2:10:36
1990	Guillaume LeBlanc; Canada	2:08:28	Andrew Jachno; Australia	2:09:09	Ian McCombie; England	2:09:20
1994	Nicholas A'Hern; Australia	2:07:53	Tim Berrett; Canada	2:08:22	Scott Nelson; New Zealand	2:09:10

=== 50 km road walk ===
Games	Gold		Silver		Bronze	
1998	Saravanan Govindasamy; Malaysia	4:10.05	Duane Cousins; Australia	4:10.30	Dominic McGrath; Australia	4:12.52
2002	Nathan Deakes; Australia	3:52.40 GR	Craig Barrett; New Zealand	3:56.42	Tim Berrett; Canada	4:04.25
2006	Nathan Deakes; Australia	3:42.53 GR	Tony Sargisson; New Zealand	3:58.05	Chris Erickson; Australia	3:58.22

=== 4 x 110 yards relay ===
Games	Gold		Silver		Bronze	
1930	Canada; Jim Brown; John Fitzpatrick; Leigh Miller; Ralph Adams	42.2	England; James Cohen; John Heap; John Hanlon; Stanley Engelhart	42.7e	South Africa; Howard Davies; Werner Gerhardt; Wilfred Legg; Willie Walters	
1934	England; Arthur Sweeney; Everard Davis; George Saunders; Walter Rangeley	42.2	Canada; Allan Poole; Birchall Pearson; Frank Nicks; Bill Christie	42.5e	Scotland; Archie Turner; David Brownlee; Ian Young; Robin Murdoch	43.0e
1938	Canada; Jack Brown; John Loaring; Larry O'Connor; Pat Haley	41.6	England; Cyril Holmes; Ken Richardson; Sandy Duncan; Lawrence Wallace	41.8e	Australia; Alf Watson; Ted Hampson; Ted Best; Howard Yates	41.9e
1950	Australia; Scotchy Gordon; David Johnson; John Treloar; Bill de Gruchy	42.2	England; Brian Shenton; Jack Archer; Leslie Lewis; Nicolas Stacey	42.5	New Zealand; Arthur Eustace; Clem Parker; Kevin Beardsley; Peter Henderson	42.6
1954	Canada (CAN); Don Stonehouse; Bruce Springbett; Harry Nelson; Don McFarlane	41.3 GR	Nigeria (NGR); Abdul Amu; Edward Ajado; Karim Olowu; Muslim Arogundade	41.3	Australia (AUS); Brian Oliver; David Lean; Hector Hogan; Kevan Gosper	41.7
1958	England; Adrian Breacker; David Segal; Roy Sandstrom; Peter Radford	40.72	Nigeria; Jimmy Omagbemi; Smart Akraka; Thomas Obi; Victor Odofin	41.05	Australia; Hector Hogan; Jim McCann; Kevan Gosper; Terry Gale	41.64
1962	England; Alf Meakin; David Jones; Len Carter; Peter Radford	40.62	Ghana; Bonner Mends; Bukari Bashiru; Michael Okantey; Michael Ahey	40.74	Wales; David England; Nick Whitehead; Ron Jones; Berwyn Jones	40.80
1966	Ghana (GHA); Bonner Mends; Ebenezer Addy; James Addy; Stanley Allotey	39.8 GR	Jamaica (JAM); Lynn Headley; Michael Fray; Pablo McNeil; Wes Clayton	40.0	Australia (AUS); Allen Crawley; Gary Holdsworth; Gary Eddy; Peter Norman	40.0

=== 4 x 440 yards relay ===
Games	Gold		Silver		Bronze	
1930	England; Roger Leigh-Wood; Stuart Townend; David Burghley; Kenneth Brangwin	3:19.4	Canada; Art Scott; Stanley Glover; Jimmy Ball; Alex Wilson	3:19.8e	South Africa; John Chandler; Wilfred Legg; Werner Gerhardt; Willie Walters	
1934	England; Denis Rathbone; Geoffrey Blake; Crew Stoneley; Godfrey Rampling	3:16.8	Canada; William Fritz; John Addison; Art Scott; Ray Lewis	3:17.2e	Scotland; Ronnie Wallace; Ronald Wylde; Hamish Stothard; Alan Hunter	+120 yd
1938	Canada; Lee Orr; Bill Dale; William Fritz; John Loaring	3:16.9	England; Frank Handley; Henry Pack; Brian MacCabe; Bill Roberts	3:19.2	New Zealand; Alan Sayers; Arnold Anderson; Graham Quinn; Harold Tyrie	3:22.0
1950	Australia; Edwin Carr; George Gedge; James Humphreys; Ross Price	3:17.8	England; Derek Pugh; John Parlett; Leslie Lewis; Terry Higgins	3:19.3	New Zealand; David Batten; Derek Steward; John Holland; Jack Sutherland	3:20.0
1954	England (ENG); Peter Higgins; Alan Dick; Peter Fryer; Derek Johnson	3:11.2 GR	Canada (CAN); Laird Sloan; Douglas Clement; Joe Foreman; Terry Tobacco	3:11.6	Australia (AUS); Brian Oliver; Don MacMillan; David Lean; Kevan Gosper	3:16.0
1958	South Africa; Gordon Day; Gerald Evans; Gert Potgieter; Malcolm Spence	3:08.21	England; Ted Sampson; John Wrighton; John Salisbury; Derek Johnson	3:09.61	Jamaica; Gerald James; Malcolm Spence; George Kerr; Keith Gardner	3:10.08
1962	Jamaica; George Kerr; Laurie Khan; Malcolm Spence; Mel Spence	3:12.3	England; Adrian Metcalfe; Barry Jackson; Bob Setti; Robbie Brightwell	3:10.2	Ghana; Ebenezer Quartey; Frederick Owusu; James Addy; John Asare-Antwi	3:11.2
1966	Trinidad and Tobago (TTO); Lennox Yearwood; Kent Bernard; Edwin Roberts; Wendell Mottley	3:02.8 GR	Canada (CAN); Ross MacKenzie; Brian MacLaren; Don Domansky; Bill Crothers	3:04.9	England (ENG); Martin Winbolt-Lewis; John Adey; Peter Warden; Tim Graham	3:06.5
