= Athletics at the 1974 British Commonwealth Games – Men's 100 metres =

Men's 100 metres at the 1974 British Commonwealth Games
- Venue: Queen Elizabeth II Park
- Dates: 25-26 January
- Competitors: 36 from 16 nations
- Winning time: 10.38

Medalists
gold medal	Don Quarrie	Jamaica
silver medal	John Mwebi	Kenya
bronze medal	Ohene Karikari	Ghana

The men's 100 metres event at the 1974 British Commonwealth Games was held on 25 and 26 January at the Queen Elizabeth II Park in Christchurch, New Zealand.

== Results ==
=== Heats ===
Held on 25 January

==== Qualification for semifinals ====
The first 3 in each heat (Q) and the next 1 fastest (q) qualified for the semifinals.

==== Wind speed ====
Heat 1: -0.1 m/s, Heat 2: +1.4 m/s, Heat 3: +1.4 m/s, Heat 4: +1.0 m/s, Heat 5: +2.0 m/s

Heats results
Rank	Heat	Name	Nationality	Time	Notes
1	1	Laurie D'Arcy	Australia	10.51	Q
2	1	Chris Monk	England	10.53	Q
3	1	Paul Njoroge	Kenya	10.6	Q
4	1	Albert Lomotey	Ghana	10.65	
5	1	William Dralu	Uganda	10.73	
6	1	Trevor Cochrane	New Zealand	10.86	
7	1	Eston Kaonga	Malawi	10.88	
8	1	Aca Similo	Fiji	11.18	
1	2	Ohene Karikari	Ghana	10.7	Q
2	2	Carl Lawson	Jamaica	10.8	Q
3	2	Robert Martin	Canada	10.9	Q
4	2	Benedict Majekodunmi	Nigeria	10.90	
5	2	Tochi Mochache	Kenya	11.07	
6	2	Grant Anderson	New Zealand	11.13	
7	2	Tony Moore	Fiji	11.30	
1	3	Graham Haskell	Australia	10.42	Q
2	3	Kolawole Abdulai	Nigeria	10.49	Q
3	3	John Mwebi	Kenya	10.5	Q
4	3	Calvin Dill	Bermuda	10.65	
5	3	Brian Green	England	10.78	
6	3	Fidelis Ndyabagye	Uganda	10.92	
7	3	Charles Lupiya	Zambia	11.09	
1	4	Don Quarrie	Jamaica	10.5	Q
2	4	Don Halliday	Scotland	10.6	Q
3	4	Norman Chihota	Tanzania	10.7	Q
4	4	Ian Matthews	England	10.74	
5	4	Edgar Chellah	Zambia	11.17	
6	4	Eliki Nukutabu	Fiji	11.17	
7	4	Stephen Higgins	Isle of Man	11.76	
1	5	George Daniels	Ghana	10.38	Q
2	5	Lennox Miller	Jamaica	10.5	Q
3	5	Greg Lewis	Australia	10.54	Q
4	5	Les Piggot	Scotland	??.?	q
5	5	Japhet Kwimba	Tanzania	10.83	
6	5	James Olakunle	Nigeria	10.84	
7	5	Kerry Hill	New Zealand	10.85	

=== Semifinals ===
Held on 26 January

==== Qualification for final ====
The first 4 in each semifinal (Q) qualified directly for the final.

==== Wind speed ====
Heat 1: +1.3 m/s, Heat 2: +0.8 m/s

Semifinal results
Rank	Heat	Name	Nationality	Time	Notes
1	1	George Daniels	Ghana	10.46	Q
2	1	Graham Haskell	Australia	10.50	Q
3	1	Don Quarrie	Jamaica	10.60	Q
4	1	Les Piggot	Scotland	10.63	Q
5	1	Norman Chihota	Tanzania	10.74	
6	1	Paul Njoroge	Kenya	10.75	
7	1	Carl Lawson	Jamaica	10.76	
8	1	Robert Martin	Canada	10.80	
1	2	John Mwebi	Kenya	10.46	Q
1	2	Greg Lewis	Australia	10.46	Q
3	2	Kolawole Abdulai	Nigeria	10.49	Q
4	2	Ohene Karikari	Ghana	10.52	Q
5	2	Laurie D'Arcy	Australia	10.57	
6	2	Lennox Miller	Jamaica	10.63	
7	2	Don Halliday	Scotland	10.63	
8	2	Chris Monk	England	10.64	

=== Final ===
Held on 26 January

==== Wind speed ====
+0.8 m/s

Final result
Rank	Lane	Name	Nationality	Time	Notes
1st place, gold medalist(s)	8	Don Quarrie	Jamaica	10.38	
2nd place, silver medalist(s)	2	John Mwebi	Kenya	10.51	
3rd place, bronze medalist(s)	7	Ohene Karikari	Ghana	10.51	
4	5	George Daniels	Ghana	10.53	
5	3	Greg Lewis	Australia	10.55	
6	4	Kolawole Abdulai	Nigeria	10.55	
7	1	Les Piggot	Scotland	10.56	
8	6	Graham Haskell	Australia	10.66	
