= Athletics at the 1974 British Commonwealth Games – Men's 200 metres =

Men's 200 metres at the 1974 British Commonwealth Games
- Venue: Queen Elizabeth II Park
- Dates: 27 and 29 January 1974

Medalists
gold medal	Don Quarrie	Jamaica
silver medal	George Daniels	Ghana
bronze medal	Bevan Smith	New Zealand

The men's 200 metres event at the 1974 British Commonwealth Games was held on 27 and 29 January at the Queen Elizabeth II Park in Christchurch, New Zealand.

== Medallists ==
Medal winners
Gold	Silver	Bronze
Don Quarrie; Jamaica	George Daniels; Ghana	Bevan Smith; New Zealand

== Results ==
=== Heats ===
Held on 27 January

==== Qualification for semifinals ====
The first 3 in each heat (Q) and the next 1 fastest (q) qualified for the semifinals.

==== Wind speed ====
Heat 1: +0.9 m/s, Heat 2: +3.1 m/s, Heat 3: +2.8 m/s, Heat 4: +1.1 m/s, Heat 5: +1.6 m/s

Results of heats
Rank	Heat	Name	Nationality	Time	Notes
1	1	George Daniels	Ghana	20.92	Q
2	1	David Jenkins	Scotland	21.0	Q
3	1	Carl Lawson	Jamaica	21.4	Q
4	1	Charles Asati	Kenya	21.5	q
5	1	Japhet Kwimba	Tanzania	21.47	
6	1	Brian Green	England	21.90	
7	1	Timon Oyebami	Nigeria	22.24	
1	2	Bevan Smith	New Zealand	20.9	Q
2	2	Ian Matthews	England	21.3	Q
3	2	Richard Hardware	Jamaica	21.5	Q
4	2	Nestor Rweyemamu	Tanzania	21.53	
5	2	Joseph Chivers	Northern Ireland	21.89	
6	2	Michael Delaney	Wales	21.91	
7	2	Tony Moore	Fiji	21.92	
	2	Ohene Karikari	Ghana	DNS	
1	3	Don Quarrie	Jamaica	20.7	Q
2	3	Greg Lewis	Australia	20.84	Q
3	3	Calvin Dill	Bermuda	21.2	Q
4	3	Trevor Cochrane	New Zealand	21.68	
5	3	Tochi Mochache	Kenya	21.69	
6	3	Samuela Yavala	Fiji	22.20	
7	3	Bambo Fatty	Gambia	22.27	
1	4	Albert Lomotey	Ghana	21.3	Q
2	4	Robert Martin	Canada	21.4	Q
3	4	Andrew Ratcliffe	Australia	21.56	Q
4	4	Grant Anderson	New Zealand	21.95	
5	4	Solomon Opiepie	Nigeria	22.10	
6	4	Eliki Nukutabu	Fiji	22.48	
7	4	Enoch Mtelemuka	Malawi	22.59	
8	4	Wavala Kali	Papua New Guinea	22.90	
1	5	Chris Monk	England	20.88	Q
2	5	John Mwebi	Kenya	21.5	Q
3	5	Graham Haskell	Australia	21.53	Q
4	5	Don Halliday	Scotland	21.69	
5	5	Motsapi Moorosi	Lesotho	21.73	
6	5	William Dralu	Uganda	21.86	
7	5	Eston Kaonga	Malawi	21.87	
8	5	Stephen Higgins	Isle of Man	23.79	

=== Semifinals ===
Held on 29 January

==== Qualification for final ====
The first 4 in each semifinal (Q) qualified directly for the final.

==== Wind speed ====
Heat 1: +1.4 m/s, Heat 2: +0.4 m/s

Semifinal results
Rank	Heat	Name	Nationality	Time	Notes
1	1	Greg Lewis	Australia	20.95	Q
2	1	David Jenkins	Scotland	20.97	Q
2	1	John Mwebi	Kenya	20.97	Q
4	1	Graham Haskell	Australia	21.12	Q
5	1	Calvin Dill	Bermuda	21.17	
6	1	Albert Lomotey	Ghana	21.48	
7	1	Ian Matthews	England	21.58	
8	1	Richard Hardware	Jamaica	21.86	
1	2	George Daniels	Ghana	21.0	Q
2	2	Don Quarrie	Jamaica	21.1	Q
3	2	Bevan Smith	New Zealand	21.2	Q
4	2	Chris Monk	England	21.2	Q
5	2	Andrew Ratcliffe	Australia	21.51	
6	2	Robert Martin	Canada	21.54	
7	2	Charles Asati	Kenya	21.56	
8	2	Carl Lawson	Jamaica	21.71	

=== Final ===
Held on 29 January

==== Wind speed ====
-0.6 m/s

Final result
Rank	Lane	Name	Nationality	Time	Notes
1st place, gold medalist(s)	1	Don Quarrie	Jamaica	20.73	
2nd place, silver medalist(s)	2	George Daniels	Ghana	20.97	
3rd place, bronze medalist(s)	6	Bevan Smith	New Zealand	21.08	
4	4	Graham Haskell	Australia	21.12	
5	3	Greg Lewis	Australia	21.17	
6	7	Chris Monk	England	21.26	
7	8	David Jenkins	Scotland	21.49	
8	5	John Mwebi	Kenya	21.60	
