= Athletics at the 1974 British Commonwealth Games – Men's 4 × 100 metres relay =

Commonwealth games relay event

Men's 4 × 100 metres relay at the 1974 British Commonwealth Games
- Venue: Queen Elizabeth II Park

Medalists
gold medal	Greg Lewis, Laurie D'Arcy, Andrew Ratcliffe, Graham Haskell	Australia
silver medal	Albert Lomotey, Ohene Karikari, Kofi Okyir, George Daniels	Ghana
bronze medal	Timon Oyebami, Benedict Majekodunmi, Kola Abdulai, James Olakunle	Nigeria

The men's 4 × 100 metres relay event at the 1974 British Commonwealth Games was held on 31 January and 2 February at the Queen Elizabeth II Park in Christchurch, New Zealand.

== Medallists ==
Medal winners
Gold	Silver	Bronze
Australia; Greg Lewis, Laurie D'Arcy, Andrew Ratcliffe, Graham Haskell	Ghana; Albert Lomotey, Ohene Karikari, Kofi Okyir, George Daniels	Nigeria; Timon Oyebami, Benedict Majekodunmi, Kola Abdulai, James Olakunle

== Results ==
=== Heats ===
==== Qualification for final ====
The first 3 teams of each heat (Q) plus the next 2 fastest (q) qualified for the final.

Heats results
Rank	Heat	Nation	Athletes	Time	Notes
1	1	Jamaica	Alfred Daley, Richard Hardware, Don Quarrie, Lennox Miller	40.1	Q
2	1	Nigeria	Timon Oyebami, Benedict Majekodunmi, Kola Abdulai, James Olakunle	40.2	Q
3	1	Ghana	Albert Lomotey, Ohene Karikari, Kofi Okyir, George Daniels	40.3	Q
4	1	New Zealand	Bevan Smith, Grant Anderson, Kerry Hill, Trevor Cochrane	40.5	q
5	1	Tanzania	Claver Kamanya, Japhet Kwimba, Norman Chihota, Salum Hassan	40.92	
1	2	Australia	Greg Lewis, Laurie D'Arcy, Andrew Ratcliffe, Graham Haskell	39.7	Q
2	2	Nigeria	Timon Oyebami, Benedict Majekodunmi, Kola Abdulai, James Olakunle	40.1	Q
3	2	Ghana	Albert Lomotey, Ohene Karikari, Kofi Okyir, George Daniels	40.3	Q
4	2	Kenya	Charles Asati, John Mwebi, Paul Njoroge, Tochi Mochache	40.8	q
5	2	Fiji	Eliki Nukutabu, Samuela Bulai, Samuela Yavala, Tony Moore	41.77	

Note: the newspaper report mentions Nigeria and Ghana for both heats and does not mention England or Scotland

=== Final ===
Final result
Rank	Lane	Nation	Athletes	Time	Notes
1st place, gold medalist(s)	4	Australia	Greg Lewis, Laurie D'Arcy, Andrew Ratcliffe, Graham Haskell	39.31	GR, AR
2nd place, silver medalist(s)	6	Ghana	Albert Lomotey, Ohene Karikari, Kofi Okyir, George Daniels	39.61	
3rd place, bronze medalist(s)	2	Nigeria	Timon Oyebami, Benedict Majekodunmi, Kola Abdulai, James Olakunle	39.70	
4	8	Jamaica	Alfred Daley, Richard Hardware, Don Quarrie, Lennox Miller	39.77	
5	7	Scotland	Les Piggot, Don Halliday, Gus McKenzie, David Jenkins	39.80	
6	1	England	Brian Green, Chris Monk, Derek Cole, Ian Matthews	39.97	
7	3	New Zealand	Bevan Smith, Grant Anderson, Kerry Hill, Trevor Cochrane	40.41	
8	5	Kenya	Charles Asati, John Mwebi, Paul Njoroge, Tochi Mochache	40.50	
