= Athletics at the 1974 British Commonwealth Games – Men's 4 × 400 metres relay =

Men's 4 × 400 metres relay at the Commonwealth Games
- Venue: Queen Elizabeth II Park
- Dates: 2 February

Medalists
gold medal	Charles Asati, Francis Musyoki, Bill Koskei, Julius Sang	Kenya
silver medal	Alan Pascoe, Andy Carter, John Wilson, Bill Hartley	England
bronze medal	Pius Olowu, William Dralu, Samuel Kakonge, Silver Ayoo	Uganda

The men's 4 × 400 metres relay event at the 1974 British Commonwealth Games was held on 2 February at the Queen Elizabeth II Park in Christchurch, New Zealand.

== Results ==
Final results
Rank	Nation	Athletes	Time	Notes
1st place, gold medalist(s)	Kenya	Charles Asati, Francis Musyoki, Bill Koskei, Julius Sang	3:04.43	
2nd place, silver medalist(s)	England	Alan Pascoe, Andy Carter, John Wilson, Bill Hartley	3:06.66	
3rd place, bronze medalist(s)	Uganda	Pius Olowu, William Dralu, Samuel Kakonge, Silver Ayoo	3:07.45	
4	Australia	Bruce Field, Gary Knoke, Max Binnington, Bill Hooker	3:07.51	
5	New Zealand	Bevan Smith, Phillip Kear, Richard Endean, Trevor Cochrane	3:08.01	
6	Wales	Colin O'Neill, Michael Delaney, Phil Lewis, Wynford Leyshon	3:08.61	
7	Nigeria	Alade Owoeye, Bruce Ijirighwo, Mamman Makama, Musa Yaro	3:08.81	
8	Fiji	Aca Similo, Richard Kermode, Samuela Bulai, Seru Gukilau	3:23.35	
