= Athletics at the 1974 British Commonwealth Games – Men's 400 metres =

Men's 400 metres at the 1974 British Commonwealth Games
- Venue: Queen Elizabeth II Park
- Dates: 25 and 26 January

Medalists
gold medal	Charles Asati	Kenya
silver medal	Silver Ayoo	Uganda
bronze medal	Claver Kamanya	Tanzania

The men's 400 metres event at the 1974 British Commonwealth Games was held on 25 and 26 January at the Queen Elizabeth II Park in Christchurch, New Zealand.

== Medallists ==
Medal winners
Gold	Silver	Bronze
Charles Asati; Kenya	Silver Ayoo; Uganda	Claver Kamanya; Tanzania

== Results ==
=== Heats ===
Held on 25 January

==== Qualification for semifinal ====
The first 3 in each heat (Q) and the next 1 fastest (q) qualified for the semifinals.

Heats results
Rank	Heat	Name	Nationality	Time	Notes
1	1	Silver Ayoo	Uganda	46.4	Q
2	1	Kim Rowe	Jamaica	47.1	Q
3	1	Bruce Field	Australia	47.66	Q
4	1	Bruce Ijirighwo	Nigeria	47.91	
5	1	Michael Delaney	Wales	48.17	
6	1	Motsapi Moorosi	Lesotho	48.87	
7	1	Seru Gukilau	Fiji	50.98	
1	2	Claver Kamanya	Tanzania	46.9	Q
2	2	Seymour Newman	Jamaica	47.0	Q
3	2	Julius Sang	Kenya	47.7	Q
4	2	Enoch Mtelemuka	Malawi	49.74	
5	2	Samuela Bulai	Fiji	50.45	
6	2	Raymond Hearn	England	52.19	
	2	Laurie D'Arcy	Australia	DNS	
1	3	Charles Asati	Kenya	46.3	Q
2	3	Pius Olowu	Uganda	46.52	Q
3	3	Mamman Makama	Nigeria	46.7	Q
4	3	Bill Hooker	Australia	47.24	q
5	3	Richard Endean	New Zealand	47.94	
6	3	Samuela Yavala	Fiji	48.54	
7	3	Bambo Fatty	Gambia	50.07	
8	3	Blackie Masalila	Botswana	50.99	
1	4	Francis Musyoki	Kenya	46.8	Q
2	4	Philip Kear	New Zealand	47.7	Q
3	4	Trevor Campbell	Jamaica	47.74	Q
4	4	Omari Abdallah	Tanzania	48.24	
5	4	Musa Yaro	Nigeria	49.03	
6	4	Wilfred Kareng	Botswana	50.02	
7	4	Wavala Kali	Papua New Guinea	50.20	
1	5	David Jenkins	Scotland	47.0	Q
2	5	Bevan Smith	New Zealand	47.2	Q
3	5	John Wilson	England	47.5	Q
4	5	Joseph Chivers	Northern Ireland	47.76	
5	5	Samuel Kakonge	Uganda	48.80	
6	5	Jacques Bazerd	Mauritius	50.30	
7	5	Stephen Higgins	Isle of Man	52.91	

=== Semifinals ===
Held on 26 January

==== Qualification for final ====
The first 4 in each semifinal (Q) qualified directly for the final.

Semifinal results
Rank	Heat	Name	Nationality	Time	Notes
1	1	Claver Kamanya	Tanzania	46.2	Q
2	1	Bevan Smith	New Zealand	46.50	Q
3	1	Pius Olowu	Uganda	46.7	Q
4	1	Mamman Makama	Nigeria	46.9	Q
5	1	Kim Rowe	Jamaica	47.12	
6	1	Julius Sang	Kenya	47.23	
	1	Trevor Campbell	Jamaica	DNF	
	1	Bill Hooker	Australia	DNS	
1	2	Silver Ayoo	Uganda	45.68	Q
2	2	Charles Asati	Kenya	45.68	Q
3	2	David Jenkins	Scotland	45.9	Q
4	2	Bruce Field	Australia	46.11	Q
5	2	Francis Musyoki	Kenya	46.39	
6	2	Seymour Newman	Jamaica	46.82	
7	2	John Wilson	England	47.06	
8	2	Philip Kear	New Zealand	47.13	

=== Final ===
Held on 26 January

Final result
Rank	Lane	Name	Nationality	Time	Notes
1st place, gold medalist(s)	6	Charles Asati	Kenya	46.04	
2nd place, silver medalist(s)	8	Silver Ayoo	Uganda	46.07	
3rd place, bronze medalist(s)	1	Claver Kamanya	Tanzania	46.16	
4	7	David Jenkins	Scotland	46.46	
5	4	Bruce Field	Australia	46.58	
6	2	Bevan Smith	New Zealand	46.60	
7	3	Pius Olowu	Uganda	46.84	
8	5	Mamman Makama	Nigeria	47.19	
