= Athletics at the 1974 British Commonwealth Games =

Athletics at the 10th British Commonwealth Games
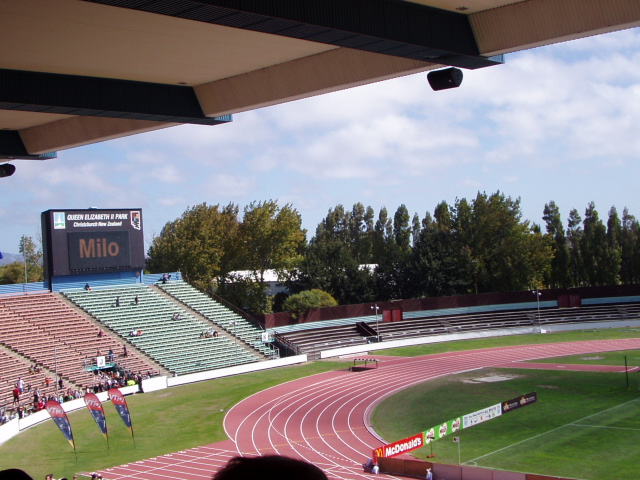
- The QE II Park was purpose-built for the 1974 Games.
- Dates: 25 January – 2 February 1974
- Host city: Christchurch, New Zealand
- Venue: Queen Elizabeth II Park
- Level: Senior
- Events: 37
- Participation: 468 athletes from 35 nations
- Records set: 1 WR, 18 GR

At the 1974 British Commonwealth Games, the athletics events were held at the Queen Elizabeth II Park in Christchurch, New Zealand between 25 January and 2 February. Athletes competed in 37 events — 23 for men and 14 for women.

== Medal summary ==
=== Men ===
Men's track and road events, medallists and times by event
Event	Gold		Silver		Bronze	
Event	Athlete	Time	Athlete	Time	Athlete	Time
100 metres (wind: +0.8 m/s)	(Jamaica) Don Quarrie	10.38	(Kenya) John Mwebi	10.51	(Ghana) Ohene Karikari	10.51
200 metres (wind: -0.6 m/s)	(Jamaica) Don Quarrie	20.73	(Ghana) George Daniels	20.97	(New Zealand) Bevan Smith	21.08
400 metres	(Kenya) Charles Asati	46.04	(Uganda) Silver Ayoo	46.07	(Tanzania) Claver Kamanya	46.16
800 metres	(Kenya) John Kipkurgat	1:43.91 GR	(Kenya) Mike Boit	1:44.39	(New Zealand) John Walker	1:44.92
1500 metres	(Tanzania) Filbert Bayi	3:32.16 WR	(New Zealand) John Walker	3:32.52	(Kenya) Ben Jipcho	3:33.16
5000 metres	(Kenya) Ben Jipcho	13:14.4 GR	(England) Brendan Foster	13:14.6	(England) Dave Black	13:23.6
10,000 metres	(New Zealand) Dick Tayler	27:46.40	(England) Dave Black	27:48.49	(Kenya) Richard Juma	27:56.96
Marathon	(England) Ian Thompson	2:09:12 GR	(New Zealand) Jack Foster	2:11:19	(Eswatini) Richard Mabuza	2:12:55
110 metres hurdles (wind: -0.1 m/s)	(Kenya) Fatwell Kimaiyo	13.69 GR	(Wales) Berwyn Price	13.84	(Australia) Max Binnington	13.88
400 metres hurdles	(England) Alan Pascoe	48.83 GR	(Australia) Bruce Field	49.32	(Kenya) William Koskei	49.34
3000 metres steeplechase	(Kenya) Ben Jipcho	8:20.67 GR	(Wales) John Davies	8:24.8	(Kenya) Evans Mogaka	8:28.51
4 × 100 metres relay	Australia: Greg Lewis, Laurie D'Arcy, Andrew Ratcliffe, Graham Haskell	39.31 GR	Ghana: Albert Lomotey, Ohene Karikari, Kofi Okyir, George Daniels	39.61	Nigeria: Timon Oyebami, Benedict Majekodunmi, Kola Abdulai, James Olakunle	39.70
4 × 400 metres relay	Kenya: Charles Asati, Francis Musyoki, Bill Koskei; Julius Sang	3:04.43	England: Alan Pascoe, Andy Carter, John Wilson, Bill Hartley	3:06.66	Uganda: Pius Olowu, William Dralu, Samuel Kakonge, Silver Ayoo	3:07.45
20 miles walk	(England) John Warhurst	2:35:23	(England) Roy Thorpe	2:39:03	(Australia) Peter Fullager	2:42:09

Men's field events, medallists and distances by event
Event	Gold		Silver		Bronze	
Event	Athlete	Distance	Athlete	Distance	Athlete	Distance
High jump	(Australia) Gordon Windeyer	2.16 GR	(Australia) Lawrie Peckham	2.14	(Canada) Claude Ferragne	2.12
Pole vault	(Australia) Don Baird	5.05	(Northern Ireland) Mike Bull	5.00	(England) Brian Hooper	5.00
Long jump	(England) Alan Lerwill	7.94	(Australia) Chris Commons	7.92	(Ghana) Joshua Owusu	7.75
Triple jump	(Ghana) Joshua Owusu	16.50	(India) Mohinder Singh Gill	16.44	(Ghana) Moise Pomaney	16.23
Shot put	(England) Geoff Capes	20.74 GR	(England) Mike Winch	19.36	(Canada) Bruce Pirnie	18.68
Discus throw	(New Zealand) Robin Tait	63.08 GR	(England) Bill Tancred	59.48	(England) John Hillier	57.22
Hammer throw	(England) Ian Chipchase	69.56	(England) Howard Payne	68.02	(Australia) Peter Farmer	67.48
Javelin throw	(England) Charles Clover	84.92 GR	(England) Dave Travis	79.92	(Kenya) John Mayaka	77.56

Men's mixed events, medallists and points
Event	Gold		Silver		Bronze	
Event	Athlete	Points	Athlete	Points	Athlete	Points
Decathlon	(Northern Ireland) Mike Bull	7417	(England) Barry King	7277	(Australia) Rob Lethbridge	7270

=== Women ===
Women's track events, medallists and times by event, with link to details: GR means Games Record
Event	Gold		Silver		Bronze	
Event	Athlete	Time	Athlete	Time	Athlete	Time
100 metres (wind: +0.5 m/s)	(Australia) Raelene Boyle	11.27 GR	(England) Andrea Lynch	11.31	(Australia) Denise Robertson	11.50
200 metres (wind: +0.2 m/s)	(Australia) Raelene Boyle	22.50 GR	(Australia) Denise Robertson	22.73	(Ghana) Alice Annum	22.90
400 metres	(Canada) Yvonne Saunders	51.67	(England) Verona Bernard	51.94	(Australia) Charlene Rendina	52.08
800 metres	(Australia) Charlene Rendina	2:01.11 GR	(New Zealand) Sue Haden	2:02.04	(Kenya) Sabina Chebichi	2:02.61
1500 metres	(Canada) Glenda Reiser	4:07.08 GR	(England) Joan Allison (Page)	4:10.66	(Canada) Thelma Wright (Fynn)	4:12.26
100 metres hurdles (wind: +1.0 m/s)	(England) Judy Vernon	13.45	(Australia) Gaye Dell	13.54	(Nigeria) Modupe Oshikoya	13.69
4 × 100 metres relay	Australia; Denise Robertson; Jennifer Lamy; Raelene Boyle; Robyn Boak	43.51 GR	England; Barbara Martin; Andrea Lynch; Judy Vernon; Sonia Lannaman	44.30	Ghana; Alice Annum; Hannah Afriyie; Josephine Ocran; Rose Asiedua	44.35
4 × 400 metres relay	England; Jannette Roscoe; Ruth Kennedy; Sue Pettett; Verona Bernard	3:29.23	Australia; Charlene Rendina; Judy Canty; Margaret Ramsay; Terri Cater	3:30.72	Canada; Brenda Walsh; Margaret McGowen; Maureen Crowley; Yvonne Saunders	3:33.92

Women's field events, medallists and heights or distances by event, with link to details: GR means Games Record
Event	Gold		Silver		Bronze	
Event	Athlete	Height or Distance	Athlete	Height or Distance	Athlete	Height or Distance
High jump	(England) Barbara Lawton	1.84	(Canada) Louise Hanna	1.82	(Canada) Brigitte Bittner	1.80
Long jump	(Nigeria) Modupe Oshikoya	6.46	(Canada) Brenda Eisler	6.38	(Wales) Ruth Martin-Jones	6.38
Shot put	(Canada) Jane Haist	16.12	(New Zealand) Valerie Young	15.29	(Australia) Jean Roberts	15.24
Discus throw	(Canada) Jane Haist	55.52 GR	(Scotland) Rosemary Payne	53.94	(Canada) Carol Martin	53.16
Javelin throw	(Australia) Petra Rivers	55.48	(Australia) Jenny Symon	52.14	(England) Sharon Corbett	50.26

Women's mixed event, medallists and points, with link to details
Event	Gold		Silver		Bronze	
Event	Athlete	Points	Athlete	Points	Athlete	Points
Pentathlon	(Northern Ireland) Mary Peters	4455	(Nigeria) Modupe Oshikoya	4423	(England) Ann Wilson	4236

== Medal table ==
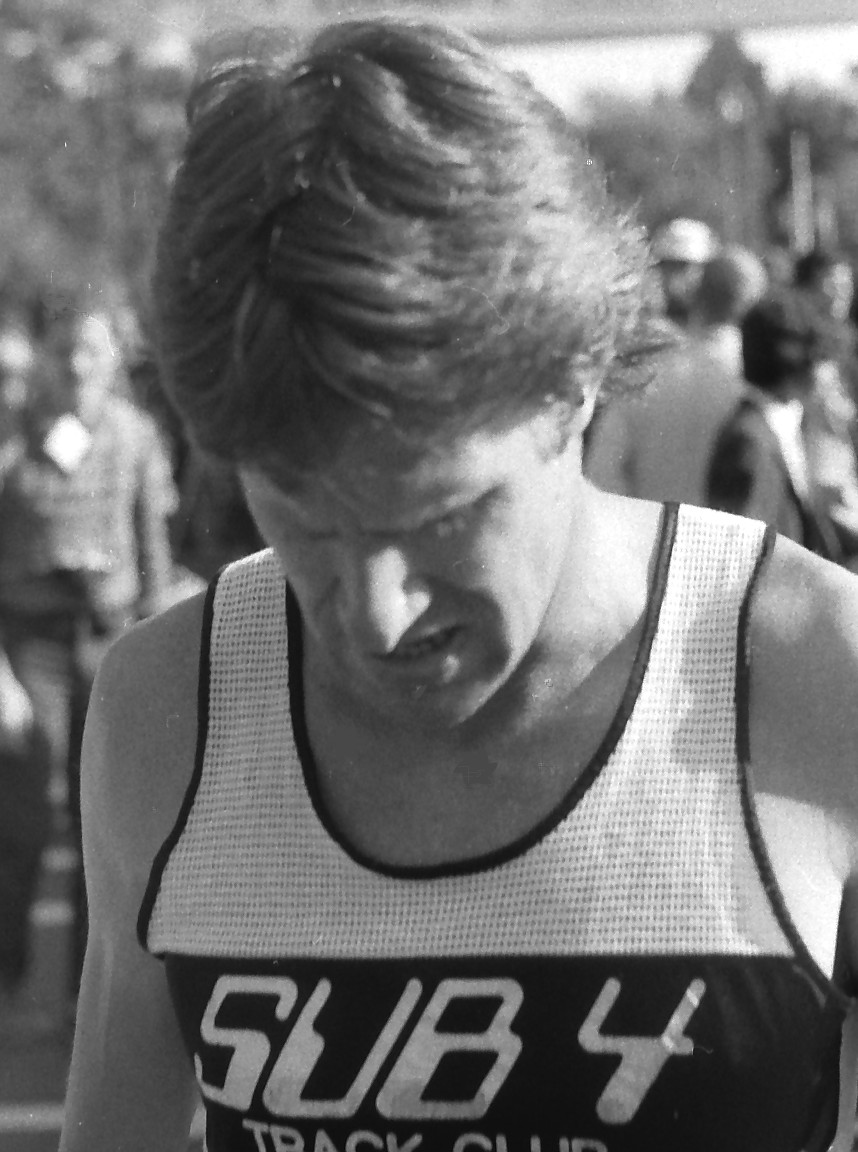
New Zealand's John Walker won medals in the 800 and 1500 metres.

* Host nation (New Zealand)

Rank	Nation	Gold	Silver	Bronze	Total
1	England (ENG)	10	13	5	28
2	Australia (AUS)	8	7	7	22
3	Kenya (KEN)	6	2	6	14
4	Canada (CAN)	4	2	6	12
5	New Zealand (NZL)*	2	4	2	8
6	Northern Ireland (NIR)	2	1	0	3
7	Jamaica (JAM)	2	0	0	2
8	Ghana (GHA)	1	2	5	8
9	Nigeria (NGR)	1	1	2	4
10	Tanzania (TAN)	1	0	1	2
11	Wales (WAL)	0	2	1	3
12	Uganda (UGA)	0	1	1	2
13	India (IND)	0	1	0	1
13	Scotland (SCO)	0	1	0	1
15	Swaziland	0	0	1	1
Totals (15 entries)		37	37	37	111

== Participating nations ==
- Australia (61)
- Barbados (2)
- Bermuda (5)
- Botswana (5)
- Canada (30)
- Cook Islands (2)
- England (66)
- Fiji (15)
- Gambia (2)
- Ghana (16)
- Gibraltar (1)
- Grenada (1)
- Guernsey (4)
- India (1)
- Isle of Man (5)
- Jamaica (12)
- Jersey (1)
- Kenya (32)
- Lesotho (6)
- Malawi (5)
- Malaysia (2)
- Mauritius (5)
- New Zealand (59)
- Nigeria (30)
- Northern Ireland (11)
- Papua New Guinea (4)
- Scotland (26)
- Singapore (2)
- Swaziland (3)
- Tanzania (16)
- Tonga (4)
- Uganda (14)
- Wales (15)
- Western Samoa (3)
- Zambia (2)
