= Nigeria at the 1972 Summer Olympics =

- IOC code: NGR
- NOC: Nigeria Olympic Committee

in Munich
- Competitors: 11
- Flag bearer: Benedict Majekodunmi
- Medals Ranked 43rd: Gold 0 Silver 0 Bronze 1 Total 1

Summer Olympics appearances (overview)
- 1952; 1956; 1960; 1964; 1968; 1972; 1976; 1980; 1984; 1988; 1992; 1996; 2000; 2004; 2008; 2012; 2016; 2020; 2024

Nigeria competed at the 1972 Summer Olympics in Munich, West Germany.

== Medalists ==
=== Bronze ===
- Isaac Ikhouria — Boxing, Men's Light Heavyweight

== Results by event ==
=== Athletics ===
Men's 100 metres

- Benedict Majekodumni

- First Heat — 10.70s (→ did not advance)

Men's 800 metres

- Jaiye Abidoye

- Heat — 1:52.0 (→ did not advance)

Men's 1500 metres

- Jaiye Abidoye

- Heat — 3:48.8 (→ did not advance)

Men's 4 × 100 m Relay

- Kola Abdulai, Rux Bazunu, James Olakunle, and Timon Oyebami

- Heat — 39.66s
- Semifinals — 39.73s (→ did not advance)

Women's 4 × 100 m Relay

- Emilie Edet, Ashanti Obi, Helen Olaye, and Modupe Oshikoya

- Heat — 45.15s (→ did not advance, 12th place)

Women's Long Jump

- Modupe Oshikoya

- Qualifying Round — 6.22m (→ did not advance, 19th place)

Women's Pentathlon

- Modupe Oshikoya

- First Heat — 4.279 points (→ 14th place)

=== Boxing ===
Men's Heavyweight (+ 81 kg)

- Fatai Ayinla

- First Round — Lost to Carroll Morgan (CAN), 2:3
