= Kofi Okyir =

Ghanaian athlete (born 1951)

Personal information
- Born: Kofi Okyir; 7 June 1951 (age 75)

Sport
- Country: Ghana
- Sport: Athletics
- Event: Sprints
Medal record
All-Africa Games
Silver medal – second place	1973 Lagos	4 x 100m
British Commonwealth Games
Silver medal – second place	1974 Christchurch	4 x 100m

Kofi Okyir (born 7 June 1951) is a Ghanaian former athlete.

A specialist sprinter, Okyir ran for Angelo State University in Texas and was a teammate of Ghanaian long jumper Joshua Owusu, who he grew up with in Kumasi and had recommended Okyir to recruiters. Okyir was the NAIA champion in the 100 yard dash in 1973.

Okyir won 4 x 100 metres silver medals at the 1973 All-Africa Games and 1974 British Commonwealth Games. He holds the African record for the 100 yard dash, setting a mark of 9.40 seconds in Austin in 1974.
