= Richard Juma =

Kenyan long-distance runner

Personal information
- Nationality: Kenyan
- Born: 19 July 1945 (age 80)

Sport
- Sport: Long-distance running
- Event: Marathon

Richard Juma (born 19 July 1945) is a Kenyan long-distance runner. He competed in the marathon at the 1972 Summer Olympics. Juma won bronze medals in the 10,000 metres in the 1973 All-Africa Games and in the 1974 British Commonwealth Games.
