= Eston Kaonga =

Malawian sprinter (born 1948)

Personal information
- Nationality: Malawian
- Born: 22 February 1948 (age 78)

Sport
- Sport: Sprinting
- Event: 200 metres

Eston Kaonga (born 22 February 1948) is a Malawian sprinter. He competed in the men's 200 metres at the 1972 Summer Olympics.

Kaonga also represented Malawi in the 100 m and 200 m at the 1974 Commonwealth Games. His times from those championships stood as Malawian records until 2019, when Stern Liffa broke them.
