= Roy Thorpe =

British racewalker (born 1934)

Personal information
- Nationality: English
- Born: 18 May 1934 (age 92)
Medal record
Athletics
Representing England
Commonwealth Games
| Silver medal – second place | 1974 Christchurch | 20km walk |

Roy Thorpe (born 18 May 1934) is a British former racewalker.

== Athletics career ==
Thorpe represented England at the 1974 British Commonwealth Games in Christchurch, New Zealand, where he won a silver medal in the 20 miles race walk. In the 1976 World Championships in Athletics he placed 32nd in the 50 kilometres race walk.
