= Charles Clover (athlete) =

British track and field athlete

Personal information
- Nationality: English
- Born: 13 May 1955 (age 71) Ipswich, Suffolk
Medal record
Athletics
Representing England
Commonwealth Games
Gold medal – first place	1974 Christchurch	Javelin throw

Charles Phillip Clover (born 13 May 1955) is a male British former track and field athlete who competed in the javelin throw.

== Athletics career ==
From Ipswich, Clover established himself as one of Britain's top young throwers in the early 1970s, setting a British youth record of 77.58 m (254 ft 6 1/4 in) in 1972. His first major competition was the 1973 European Athletics Junior Championships, where a throw of 72.10 m (236 ft 6 1/2 in) placed him fourth overall. He proved himself at the top of the national scene with a win at the Commonwealth Games trials in 1973, gaining his first senior selection for England in the process.

Representing England at the 1974 British Commonwealth Games, held in February in Christchurch, the 18-year-old Clover caused an upset by beating his compatriot and defending champion Dave Travis in the final. Clover improved his personal best by more than seven metres over the course of the competition and ended with a best of 84.92 m (278 ft 7 1/4 in) – a European, Commonwealth and European junior record. It was also a new games record by a margin of more than five metres. Among British men, this mark was not beaten for a decade and remains the national record at junior level.

After this performance he never again reached such heights. He was the 1974 winner at the AAA Junior Championships, but wins at the South of England Championships in 1976 and 1982 proved to be the highest level accolades he won after the Commonwealth title.
