= Dave Black (runner) =

British long-distance runner

Personal information
- Nationality: British (English)
- Born: 2 October 1952 (age 73) Tamworth, Staffordshire, England

Sport
- Sport: Athletics
- Event: Long-distance running/Marathon
- Club: Small Heath Harriers; Tamworth AC
Medal record
Athletics
Representing England
Commonwealth Games
Silver medal – second place	1974 Christchurch	10,000m
Bronze medal – third place	1974 Christchurch	5,000m

David John Black (born 2 October 1952) is a male British retired long-distance runner who competed at the 1976 Summer Olympics and the 1980 Summer Olympics.

== Biography ==
Black finished third behind Brendan Foster in the 5000 metres event at the 1973 AAA Championships.

He represented England and won a silver medal in the 10,000 metres and a bronze medal in the 5,000 metres, at the 1974 British Commonwealth Games in Christchurch, New Zealand. The following year, he became the British 10,000 metres champion after winning the British AAA Championships title at the 1975 AAA Championships.

In 1976 while living in Polesworth, he represented Great Britain at the 1976 Olympics Games in Montreal. He then became the British 5000 metres champion at the 1977 AAA Championships.

He represented England again at the Commonwealth Games, in the 10,000 metres, at the 1978 Commonwealth Games in Edmonton, Canada and went to a second Olympics when he represented Great Britain in the marathon at the 1980 Olympics Games in Moscow.
