= Bill Koskei =

Ugandan-Kenyan hurdler and sprinter

Personal information
- Nationality: Kenyan
- Born: William Koskei; 28 December 1947 (age 78)
- Height: 1.83 m (6 ft 0 in)
- Weight: 72 kg (159 lb)

Sport
- Country: Uganda; Kenya
- Sport: Men's athletics
Medal record
All-Africa Games
Silver medal – second place	1973 Lagos	400 m hurdles
Commonwealth Games
Gold medal – first place	1974 Christchurch	4 × 400 m relay
Gold medal – first place	1978 Edmonton	4 × 400 m relay
Bronze medal – third place	1974 Christchurch	400 m hurdles
Representing Uganda
Commonwealth Games
Silver medal – second place	1970 Edinburgh	400 m hurdles

William Koskei (born 28 December 1947) was a Kenyan track and field athlete who specialised in the 400 metres hurdles and 4 × 400 metres relay.

== Biography ==
Koskei trained in Uganda early in his career and won a silver medal for his adopted country in the 400 metres hurdles at the 1970 British Commonwealth Games.

His appearance at the 1972 Summer Olympics came after he switched allegiances back to his native Kenya. He competed in the 400 metres hurdles where he was eliminated following his first heat, which he finished in fourth position.

He won further 400 metres hurdles medals over the next two years, a silver at the 1973 All-Africa Games and a bronze at the 1974 British Commonwealth Games in Christchurch. At the 1974 British Commonwealth Games he was also a member of Kenya's gold medal-winning 4 × 400 metres relay team.

He won another gold medal with the 4 × 400 metres relay team at the 1978 Commonwealth Games.

== See also ==
- List of Commonwealth Games medallists in athletics (men)
- List of African Games medalists in athletics (men)
