= John Kipkurgat =

Kenyan middle-distance runner

Medal record

Men's athletics

Representing Kenya

British Commonwealth Games
Gold medal – first place	1974 Christchurch	800 metres

All-Africa Games
Silver medal – second place	1973 Lagos	800 metres

John Kipkurgat (born 16 March 1944) is a Kenyan former middle-distance runner who won gold in men's 800 metres at the 1974 British Commonwealth Games.

== Career ==
Kipkurgat won silver in men's 800 metres behind fellow Kenyan Cosmas Silei at the 1973 All-Africa Games in Lagos, Nigeria. At the 1974 Commonwealth Games in Christchurch, New Zealand Kipkurgat won gold, leading the 800 m final from gun to tape; his winning time of 1:43.91 was a new African and Commonwealth record, and only two-tenths off Marcello Fiasconaro's world record of 1:43.7.

Kipkurgat attempted to break Fiasconaro's world record two months later in Pointe-à-Pierre, Trinidad and Tobago. He split 1:13.2 for 600 m, but ran completely out of energy and almost walked to the finish; his 600 m split, however, remains the fastest ever in an 800 m race and one of the fastest 600 m times in any conditions.

Kipkurgat later joined the International Track Association, a professional circuit; at the time, athletics was primarily an amateur sport where most athletes only received under-the-table money, and turning openly professional disqualified him from running in further major international meets.
