= Claude Ferragne =

Canadian high jumper (1952–2024)

Personal information
- Full name: Claude Ferragne
- Born: October 14, 1952 Montreal, Quebec, Canada
- Died: July 7, 2024 (aged 71)
Medal record
Men's athletics
Representing Canada
Commonwealth Games
Gold medal – first place	1978 Edmonton	High jump
Bronze medal – third place	1974 Christchurch	High jump

Claude Ferragne (14 October 1952 – 7 July 2024) was a Canadian high jumper who competed in the 1976 Summer Olympics. Ferragne was born in Montreal, Quebec. He died on 7 July 2024, at the age of 71.
