= John Hillier =

British discus thrower

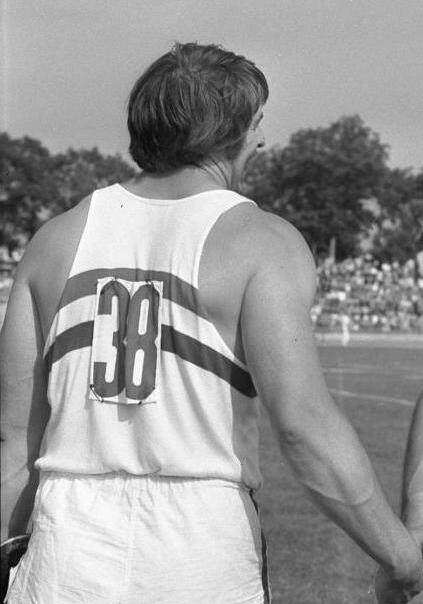
- Hillier in 1975

Personal information
- Born: 29 December 1944 (age 81) Woolwich, London, England

Sport
- Sport: Athletics
- Event: discus throw
- Club: Hillingdon AC

Achievements and titles
- Personal best: 59.76m
Medal record
Athletics
Representing England
Commonwealth Games
Bronze medal – third place	1974 Christchurch	discus

John Noel Hillier (born 29 December 1944) is a former athlete who represented both England and Great Britain. John threw a PB of 59.76m on the 27th of July, 1976, in Edinburgh, Scotland.

== Biography ==
Hillier finished second behind Bill Tancred in the discus throw event at the 1973 AAA Championships. He then represented England and won a bronze medal in the discus event, at the 1974 British Commonwealth Games in Christchurch, New Zealand.

Hillier would podium at the AAAs three more times in 1974, 1977 and 178 and represented England in the discus event, at the 1978 Commonwealth Games in Edmonton, Canada.

== Coaching ==
After retiring from competing, Hillier took up being an athletics coach, and has coached the likes of Myrtle Augee, Lawrence Okoye, Shaunagh Brown & Nicholas Percy. He continues to coach a large number of athletes across a wide range of ages.
