= Andrew Ratcliffe (sprinter) =

Australian sprinter

Personal information
- Born: Andrew William Ratcliffe; 27 April 1955 (age 71)

Sport
- Country: Australia
- Sport: Athletics
- Event: Sprinting
Medal record
British Commonwealth Games
Gold medal – first place	1974 Christchurch	4×100 metres

Andrew William Ratcliffe (born 27 April 1955) is an Australian former athlete who competed as a sprinter. He was a four-time New South Wales state 100 metres champion and a Commonwealth Games gold medalist.

== Athletics career ==
Active in the 1970s, Ratcliffe is an Old Boy of Scots College in Sydney and was a GPS record holder. He received coaching from Trinidad Olympic athlete Mike Agostini. In 1973, Ratcliffe represented Australia at the Pacific Conference Games in Toronto and the World University Games in Moscow. He was a 4×100 metres gold medalist at the 1974 British Commonwealth Games in Christchurch (teamed with Greg Lewis, Laurie D'Arcy and Graham Haskell).
