= Bruce Ijirighwo =

Nigerian sprinter

Personal information
- Nationality: Nigerian
- Born: 6 November 1949 (age 76)

Sport
- Sport: Sprinting
- Event: 400 metres

Bruce Ijirighwo (born 6 November 1949) is a Nigerian sprinter. He competed in the men's 400 metres at the 1972 Summer Olympics.
