= Don Baird =

Australian pole vaulter (1951–2026)

Donald George Baird (29 May 1951 – February 2026) was an Australian pole vaulter. He set his personal best (5.53 metres) on 16 April 1977 at a meet in Long Beach. He was coached by pole vault coach Walter Chisholm.

== Biography ==
Competing for the Long Beach State Beach track and field team, Baird won the 1977 pole vault at the NCAA Division I Indoor Track and Field Championships with a mark of 5.28 metres.

After retiring as an athlete, Baird continued living in California, working as a corporate fundraiser for high school athletics programs. He died in California in February 2026, at the age of 74.

== Achievements ==
Year	Competition	Venue	Position	Notes
1974	Commonwealth Games	Christchurch, New Zealand	1st	5.05 m
1977	IAAF World Cup	Düsseldorf, West Germany	4th	5.20 m
1978	Commonwealth Games	Edmonton, Canada	2nd	5.10 m

== Sources ==
- trackfield.brinkster
