= Evans Mogaka =

Kenyan long-distance runner

Personal information
- Nationality: Kenyan
- Born: 21 December 1949
- Died: 17 June 1977 (aged 27)

Sport
- Sport: Long-distance running
- Event: 5000 metres

Evans Mogaka (21 December 1949 – 17 June 1977) was a Kenyan long-distance runner. He competed in the men's 5000 metres at the 1972 Summer Olympics.
