= Moise Pomaney =

Ghanaian athletics competitor

Personal information
- Full name: Moise Atsu Pomaney
- Nationality: Ghanaian
- Born: March 22, 1945 (age 81)
- Height: 6 ft (1.83 m) (1972)
- Weight: 159 lb (72.1 kg) (1972)

Sport
- Country: Ghana
- Sport: Triple jump Long jump

Achievements and titles
- Regional finals: 1974 British Commonwealth Games Bronze medallist, triple jump
- Personal best(s): Long jump 7.53 metres Triple jump 16.23 metres

Moise Atsu Pomaney (born March 22, 1945) is a retired Olympic track and field athlete from Ghana. He specialized in the long jump and the triple jump.

Pomaney represented Ghana at the 1972 Olympic Games held in Munich, Germany. He claimed the bronze medal in the men's triple jump event at the 1974 British Commonwealth Games held in Christchurch, New Zealand with a jump of 16.23 metres (also a personal best for the event).

Moise Atsu Pomaney was inducted into the National Athletics Intercollegiate Association (NAIA) Track and Field Hall of Fame in 1991. Moises was also a member of the 1971 Pan-African Track and Field team.
