= Graham Haskell =

Australian athletics competitor

Personal information
- Born: Graham Haskell; 30 August 1948 (age 78) England

Sport
- Country: Australia
- Sport: Athletics
- Event: Sprinting
Medal record
British Commonwealth Games
Gold medal – first place	1974 Christchurch	4×100 metres

Graham Haskell (born 30 August 1948) is an Australian former athlete of the 1970s.

Born in England, Haskell competed as a sprinter and previously held the national record in the 100 metres at 10.1 seconds. He was a two-time national 100 metres champion. At the 1974 British Commonwealth Games in Christchurch he was a member of the gold medal-winning 4×100 metres relay team (with Laurie D'Arcy, Greg Lewis and Andrew Ratcliffe). He also made both the 100 m and 200 m individual finals, finishing eighth and fourth respectively.

Haskell now lives in Tasmania and is a contemporary artist.
