= Calvin Dill =

Bermudian sprinter

Personal information
- Full name: Calvin Leroy Dill
- Nationality: Bermudian
- Born: 4 September 1955 (age 70)

Sport
- Sport: Sprinting
- Event: 200 metres

Calvin Leroy Dill (born 4 September 1955) is a Bermudian sprinter. He competed in the men's 200 metres at the 1976 Summer Olympics.
