= William Dralu =

Ugandan sprinter (born 1947)

Personal information
- Nationality: Ugandan
- Born: 5 June 1947 (age 79)

Sport
- Sport: Sprinting
- Event: 100 metres

William Santino Dralu (born 5 June 1947) is a Ugandan sprinter from Logoba Parish, Moyo sub-county, Moyo district. He competed in the men's 100 metres at the 1968 Olympics and 1972 Summer Olympics. He won a bronze medal at the 1974 British Commonwealth Games in the 4 x 400 metres relay.

== See also ==
- Uganda at the 1968 Summer Olympics
- Uganda at the 1972 Summer Olympics
- Athletics Uganda
- List of Commonwealth Games medalists in athletics
