= Chris Monk =

British sprinter

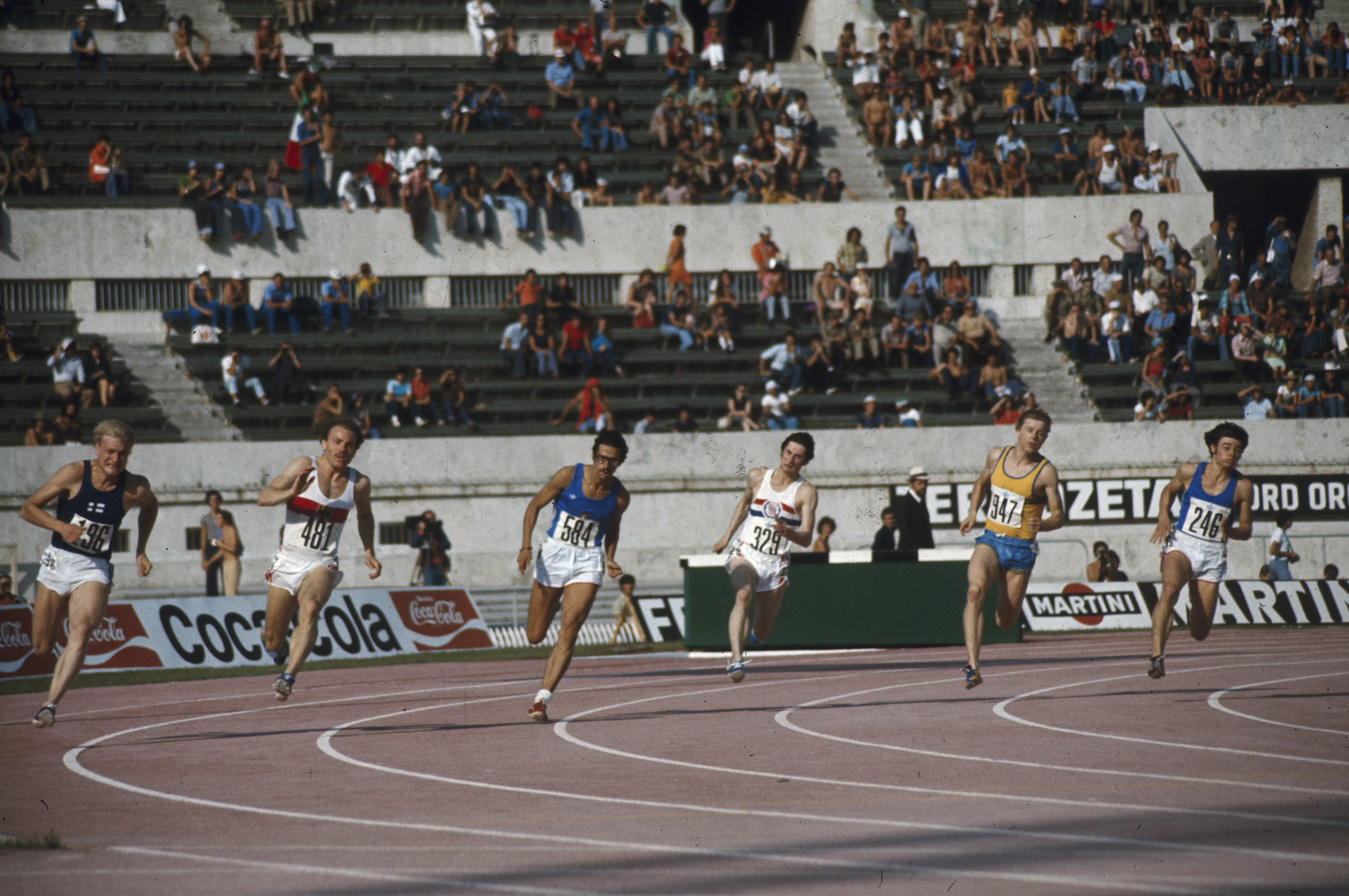
- Chris Monk (third from right) competing at the 1974 European Athletics Championships in Rome

Personal information
- Nationality: British (English)
- Born: 29 September 1951 (age 74) Ealing, Middlesex, England

Sport
- Sport: Athletics
- Event: Sprints
- Club: Leicester Coritanian AC
Medal record
Representing Great Britain
European Cup
Gold medal – first place	1973 Edinburgh	200m
Summer Universiade
Silver medal – second place	1973 Moscow	200m

Christopher Leslie Monk (born 29 September 1951), is a male retired athlete who competed for Great Britain and England.

== Biography ==
Monk became the British 200 metres champion after winning the British AAA Championships title at the 1973 AAA Championships. Later that year he won the gold medal at the European Cup.

Monk was British champion again at the 1974 AAA Championships by virtue of being the highest placed British athlete, finishing second behind American Mark Lutz.

He also represented England in the sprint events, at the 1974 British Commonwealth Games in Christchurch, New Zealand.
