= John Wilson (sprinter) =

Personal information
- Nationality: English
- Born: 11 October 1948 (age 77)
Medal record
Athletics
Representing England
Commonwealth Games
Silver medal – second place	1974 Christchurch	4 x 400m relay

John Alan Wilson (born 1948), is a former athlete who competed for England.

== Athletics career ==
He represented England and won a silver medal in the 4 x 400 metres relay with Alan Pascoe, Andy Carter and Bill Hartley, at the 1974 British Commonwealth Games in Christchurch, New Zealand. He also competed at the European Athletics Championships 1971 in Helsinki.
