= Samuela Yavala =

Fijian sprinter (born 1947)

Personal information
- Nationality: Fijian
- Born: 24 August 1947 (age 78)

Sport
- Sport: Sprinting
- Event: 400 metres

Samuela Yavala (born 24 August 1947) is a Fijian sprinter. He competed in the men's 400 metres at the 1972 Summer Olympics.
