= Bruce Field (athlete) =

Australian former athlete

Personal information
- Born: Bruce William Field; 22 January 1947 (age 79) Melbourne, Australia
- Height: 1.77 m (5 ft 9 1/2 in)
- Weight: 72 kg (159 lb)

Sport
- Country: Australia
- Sport: Athletics
- Event: Sprint / Hurdles / Long jump
- Club: St. Stephens Harriers
Medal record
Men's Athletics
British Commonwealth Games
Silver medal – second place	1974 Christchurch	400 m hurdles

Bruce William Field (born 22 January 1947) is an Australian former athlete who competed at the 1972 Summer Olympics and won a silver medal at the 1974 British Commonwealth Games. He specialised in sprint races, hurdles and the long jump.

Field was born in Melbourne and trained at St. Stephens Harriers in Mount Waverley.

== Career ==
At the 1972 Summer Olympics he took part in both the long jump and 400 metres hurdles. The only Australian in the long jump competition, he finished in 15th position with a leap of 7.76m, finishing 3 cm short of a place in the final. He was in the fourth heat for the 400 metres hurdles, which was won by eventual gold medalist John Akii-Bua. Field placed fourth and was eliminated from the competition.

In 1974 he was the national champion in the 400 metres hurdles and in the same year won a silver medal in the 400 metres hurdles event, behind England's Alan Pascoe, at the British Commonwealth Games in Christchurch. His time of 49.32 set in Christchurch remained a national record for 20 years. He also had top five finishes in the 400 metres and long jump.

== Post-athletics ==
While competing in athletics, Field also studied for a PhD at the University of Melbourne.

He is now an Associate Professor in the Monash University Department of Mechanical Engineering.
