= Silver Ayoo =

Ugandan athlete (born 1950)

Personal information
- Nationality: Ugandan
- Born: Silver Ayoo; 26 November 1950 (age 75)
- Height: 1.88 m (6 ft 2 in)
- Weight: 72 kg (159 lb)

Sport
- Country: Uganda
- Sport: Athletics
Medal record
Men's Athletics
All-Africa Games
Bronze medal – third place	1973 Lagos	400m hurdles
Commonwealth Games
Silver medal – second place	1974 Christchurch	400 metres
Bronze medal – third place	1974 Christchurch	4 x 400m relay

Silver Ayoo (born 26 November 1950) is a Ugandan former athlete who competed as a sprinter in 400 metre events. He represented Uganda at the 1972 Summer Olympics and 1980 Summer Olympics.

Ayoo took part in the 400 metres race at the 1972 Summer Olympics and was eliminated in the opening heats.

At the 1973 All-Africa Games in Lagos, Ayoo was a bronze medallist in the 400 metres hurdles.

Ayoo won a silver and bronze medal at the 1974 British Commonwealth Games, in the 400 metres and 4 x 400 metres relay respectively.

He missed the 1976 Summer Olympics as Uganda were one of the countries that boycotted.

Back at the Olympics in 1980 he improved on his previous performance in the 400 metres by progressing to the quarter-finals. He was also a member of Uganda's 4 × 400 metres relay team at those games.
