= Joshua Owusu =

Ghanaian long and triple jumper

Medal record

Men's Athletics

Representing Ghana

British Commonwealth Games
Gold medal – first place	1974 Christchurch	Triple Jump

All-Africa Games
Gold medal – first place	1973 Lagos	Long Jump

Joshua Owusu (born October 2, 1948) is a retired Olympic track and field athlete from Ghana. He specialised in the triple jump and the long jump events during his career.

Owusu represented Ghana at the 1972 Olympic Games where he finished in fourth place, 2 cm out of a medal. He claimed the gold medal in the men's triple jump event at the 1974 British Commonwealth Games for his native West African country.

Owusu was recruited to Eastern New Mexico University, where he ran for the Eastern New Mexico Greyhounds track and field team alongside Mike Murei.
