= Pius Olowo =

Ugandan sprinter

Personal information
- Nationality: Ugandan
- Born: 21 June 1948 (age 78)
- Died: 2 may 2023 Kampala

Sport
- Sport: Sprinting
- Event: 4 × 400 metres relay

Pius Olowo (born 21 June 1948) is a Ugandan sprinter. He competed in the men's 4 × 400 metres relay at the 1980 Summer Olympics.
