= Benedict Majekodunmi =

Nigerian sprinter (1940–2023)

Personal information
- Nationality: Nigerian
- Born: 12 January 1940
- Died: January 2023 (aged 82)

Sport
- Sport: Sprinting
- Event: 100 metres

Benedict A. Majekodunmi (12 January 1940 – January 2023) was a Nigerian sprinter. He competed in the men's 100 metres at the 1972 Summer Olympics, and was a member of Nigeria's 4 × 100 metres relay team in 1968 and 1972. Majekodunmi won a bronze medal in the 4 x 100 metres relay at the 1974 British Commonwealth Games.
