= John Mwebi =

Kenyan sprinter (born 1950)

Personal information
- Nationality: Kenyan
- Born: 18 January 1950 (age 76)

Sport
- Sport: Sprinting
- Event: 100 metres

John Mwebi (born 18 January 1950) is a Kenyan sprinter. He competed in the men's 100 metres at the 1972 Summer Olympics. He won a silver medal in the 100 metres at the 1974 British Commonwealth Games. Mwebi also won bronze medals in the 100 and 200 metres at the 1973 All-Africa Games.
