= Kola Abdulai =

Nigerian sprinter (1947–2009)

Personal information
- Nationality: Nigerian
- Born: 22 July 1947 Zaria, Nigeria
- Died: 30 July 2009 (aged 62)

Sport
- Sport: Sprinting
- Event: 100 metres

Lawal Kowawole “Kola” Abdulai (22 July 1947 – 30 July 2009) was a Nigerian sprinter. He competed in the 100 metres at the 1968 Summer Olympics and the 1972 Summer Olympics. Abdulai won a bronze medal in the 4 x 100 metres relay at the 1974 British Commonwealth Games.
