= Albert Lomotey =

Ghanaian sprinter (born 1955)

Personal information
- Nationality: Ghanaian
- Born: 25 August 1955 (age 70)

Sport
- Sport: Sprinting
- Event(s): 100 m, 200 m

Albert Lomotey (born 25 August 1955) is a Ghanaian sprinter.

He participated at the 1974 British Commonwealth Games in Christchurch, winning a silver medal. He also participated at the 1978 Commonwealth Games in Edmonton.

His personal bests are:

- 100 metres: 10.0 (hand time), in College Park, Maryland (USA) 15 MAY 1977;
- 200 metres: 20.91 (-0.7 m/s), in Montreal (CAN) 27 July 1975
