= Timon Oyebami =

Nigerian sprinter (born 1943)

Personal information
- Nationality: Nigerian
- Born: 12 July 1943 (age 82)

Sport
- Sport: Sprinting
- Event: 4 × 100 metres relay

Timon Oyebami (born 12 July 1943) is a Nigerian sprinter. He competed in the 4 × 100 metres relay at the 1968 Summer Olympics and the 1972 Summer Olympics. Oyebami won a bronze medal in the 4 x 100 metres relay at the 1974 British Commonwealth Games.
