= Ohene Karikari =

Ghanaian sprinter (born 1954)

Medal record

Men's Athletics

Representing Ghana

Commonwealth Games
Silver medal – second place	1974 Christchurch	4 x 100 m relay
Bronze medal – third place	1974 Christchurch	100 m

All-Africa Games
Gold medal – first place	1973 Lagos	100 m
Gold medal – first place	1973 Lagos	200 m
Bronze medal – third place	1978 Algiers	100 m

Ohene Karikari (born 1 December 1954) is a former sprinter from Ghana, who represented his native West African country at the 1972 Summer Olympics in Munich, West Germany. He is best known for winning two gold medals (100 and 200 metres) at the 1973 All-Africa Games in Lagos, Nigeria.

Karikari was an All-American sprinter for the Colorado Buffaloes track and field team, finishing runner-up in the 55 metres at the 1974 NCAA Indoor Track and Field Championships. In 1973, he tied the world record of 6.5 seconds in the 60 yards hurdles.

== Personal bests ==
- 100 metres – 10.39 (1979)
