= James Olakunle =

Nigerian sprinter (born 1947)

Personal information
- Nationality: Nigerian
- Born: 14 June 1947 (age 79)

Sport
- Sport: Sprinting
- Event: 4 × 100 metres relay

James Alanai Olakunle (born 14 June 1947) is a Nigerian sprinter. He competed in the men's 4 × 100 metres relay at the 1972 Summer Olympics. Olakunle won a bronze medal in the 4 x 100 metres relay at the 1974 British Commonwealth Games.
