= George Daniels (sprinter) =

Ghanaian sprinter (1950–2005)

George Kofi Daniels (8 March 1950 – 13 August 2005) was a Ghanaian sprinter who competed in the 1972 Summer Olympics and 1976 Summer Olympics. Additionally, he participated in the 1970 British Commonwealth Games and won a silver medal at the 1974 British Commonwealth Games.

Daniels was an All-American sprinter for the Colorado Buffaloes track and field team, placing runner-up in the 200 metres at the 1971 NCAA University Division Outdoor Track and Field Championships.

In 2004, Daniels was sentenced to seven years in prison for raping his niece. He died on August 13, 2005, at the age of 56.
