= Bevan Smith =

New Zealand sprinter

Personal information
- Born: Bevan Duncan Smith; 18 July 1950 (age 76) Lower Hutt, New Zealand
- Height: 193 cm (6 ft 4 in)
- Weight: 83 kg (183 lb)

Sport
- Country: New Zealand
- Sport: Athletics
- Events: 100 m; 200 m; 400 m
- Club: Kiwi Athletic Club
Medal record
Men's athletics
Representing New Zealand
British Commonwealth Games
Bronze medal – third place	1974 Christchurch	200 m

Bevan Duncan Smith (born 18 July 1950) is a former New Zealand sprinter. He won the bronze medal in the men's 200 metres at the 1974 British Commonwealth Games.

He represented New Zealand at the 1972 Summer Olympics, placing 4th in his heat of the 2nd round of the 200 metres.

At the 1974 British Commonwealth Games he came 4th in the 400 metres, and was part of the men's 4 × 100 m and 4 × 400 m relay teams that placed 7th and 5th respectively. Smith competed at his second Commonwealth Games in 1978 where he made the quarter finals of the 200 metres and ran in the 4 x 100 and 4 x 400 relay teams again.

Smith finished third behind David Jenkins in the 400 metres event at the 1975 AAA Championships.
