= Laurie D'Arcy =

New Zealand sprinter

Lawrence Leys D'Arcy (born 3 May 1947 in Timaru) is a former sprinter who competed in the 1972 Summer Olympics for New Zealand and at the 1974 Commonwealth Games for Australia, winning a gold medal in 4 × 100 m relay.
