= Greg Lewis (sprinter) =

Australian sprinter (born 1946)

Personal information
- Born: 9 December 1946 (age 79) East Melbourne, Victoria, Australia
Medal record
Men's athletics
Representing Australia
Commonwealth Games
Gold medal – first place	1974 Christchurch	4x100m relay
Summer Universiade
Bronze medal – third place	1967 Tokyo	4x100m relay

Gregory Lewis (born 9 December 1946) is an Australian retired Olympic athlete who competed in the 100 metres and 200 metres.

== Achievements ==
Lewis won six Australian Championships during his career and represented Australia at the 1968 Olympic Games and two Commonwealth Games. In his final international competition, the 1974 British Commonwealth Games in Christchurch, Lewis won a gold medal as part of the victorious Australian 4 x 100 metres relay team.

== Additional information ==
In 1972, Lewis married Commonwealth Games High jumper Carolyn Wright. Their daughter Tamsyn Manou is a three-time Olympian, specialising in the 800 metres, who has won three Commonwealth Games relay gold medals and one World Indoor 800m gold medal.

== Statistics ==
Personal Bests

Event	Performance	Wind	Place	Date
100y	9.4		Melbourne, Australia	16 March 1966
100m (hand)	10.1	+0.8	Melbourne, Australia	11 November 1972
100m (auto)	10.46	+0.8	Auckland, New Zealand	26 January 1974
200m	20.53	+0.6	Mexico City, Mexico	16 October 1968

== See also ==
- Australian athletics champions
