= Athletics at the 1970 British Commonwealth Games – Men's 4 × 100 metres relay =

Men's 4 × 100 metres relay at the 1970 British Commonwealth Games
- Venue: Meadowbank Stadium, Edinburgh
- Dates: 25 July 1970

Medalists
gold medal	Errol Stewart, Lennox Miller, Carl Lawson, Don Quarrie	Jamaica
silver medal	Michael Ahey, James Addy, Edward Owusu, George Daniels	Ghana
bronze medal	Ian Green, Martin Reynolds, Dave Dear, Brian Green	England

The men's 4 × 100 metres relay event at the 1970 British Commonwealth Games was held on 25 July at the Meadowbank Stadium in Edinburgh, Scotland. It was the first time that the metric distance was contested at the Games, replacing the 4 × 110 yards relay.

== Medallists ==
Medallists
Gold	Silver	Bronze
Jamaica; Errol Stewart, Lennox Miller, Carl Lawson, Don Quarrie	Ghana; Michael Ahey, James Addy, Edward Owusu, George Daniels	England; Ian Green, Martin Reynolds, Dave Dear, Brian Green

== Results ==
=== Heats ===
==== Qualification for final ====
The first 4 teams in each heat (Q) qualified directly for the final.

Heats results
Rank	Heat	Nation	Athletes	Time	scope=col Notes
1	1	Trinidad and Tobago	Wendell Mottley, Carl Archer, Hasely Crawford, Edwin Roberts	40.3	Q
2	1	England	Ian Green, Martin Reynolds, Dave Dear, Brian Green	40.5	Q
3	1	Nigeria	Timon Oyebami, Robert Ojo, Benedict Majekodunmi, Kolawole Abdulai	40.9	Q
4	1	Northern Ireland	Mike Bull, Gerard Carson, Joe Chivers, John Kilpatrick	41.2	Q
5	1	Antigua and Barbuda	Calvin Greenaway, Cuthbert Jacobs, Fred Sowerby, Patrick Francis	42.8	
	1	Australia	Greg Lewis, Phil May, Gary Eddy, Peter Norman	DNF	
	1	Bahamas	Bernard Nottage, Gerald Wisdom, Kevin Johnson, Tom Robinson	DNF	
1	2	Jamaica	Errol Stewart, Lennox Miller, Carl Lawson, Don Quarrie	40.0	Q
2	2	Ghana	Michael Ahey, James Addy, Edward Owusu, George Daniels	40.1	Q
3	2	Wales	Terry Davies, Lynn Davies, John Williams, Howard Davies	40.5	Q
4	2	Scotland	Ian Turnbull, Les Piggot, Stuart Bell, Don Halliday	40.5	Q
	2	Canada	Brian Donnelly, George Neeland, Rich McDonald, Rick Cuttell	DQ	
	2	Pakistan	Ghulam Qadir, Iqbal Shinwari, John Permal, Muhammad Mohddin	DQ	
	2	Gambia	Dodou Joof, Percy Coker, Pierre Jallow, Sheikh Tidiane Faye	DQ	

=== Final ===
Final results
Rank	Nation	Athletes	Time	Notes
1st place, gold medalist(s)	Jamaica	Errol Stewart, Lennox Miller, Carl Lawson, Don Quarrie	39.46	GR
2nd place, silver medalist(s)	Ghana	Michael Ahey, James Addy, Edward Owusu, George Daniels	39.82	
3rd place, bronze medalist(s)	England	Brian Green, Dave Dear, Ian Green, Martin Reynolds	40.05	
4	Scotland	Ian Turnbull, Les Piggot, Stuart Bell, Don Halliday	40.0	
5	Wales	Terry Davies, Lynn Davies, John Williams, Howard Davies	40.2	
6	Trinidad and Tobago	Wendell Mottley, Carl Archer, Hasely Crawford, Edwin Roberts	40.3	
7	Nigeria	Timon Oyebami, Robert Ojo, Benedict Majekodunmi, Kolawole Abdulai	40.9	
8	Northern Ireland	Mike Bull, Gerard Carson, Joe Chivers, John Kilpatrick	41.1	
