= Athletics at the 1970 British Commonwealth Games – Men's 100 metres =

Event at 1970 British Commonwealth Games

Men's 100 metres at the 1970 British Commonwealth Games
- Venue: Meadowbank Stadium
- Dates: 17 and 18 July
- Competitors: 56 from 24 nations
- Winning time: 10.24 secs

Medalists
gold medal	Don Quarrie	Jamaica
silver medal	Lennox Miller	Jamaica
bronze medal	Hasely Crawford	Trinidad and Tobago

The men's 100 metres event at the 1970 British Commonwealth Games was held on 17 and 18 July at the Meadowbank Stadium in Edinburgh, Scotland. It was the first time that the metric distance was contested at the Games, replacing the 100 yards event.

== Results ==
=== Heats ===
Held on 17 July

==== Qualification for quarterfinals ====
The first 4 in each heat (Q) qualified directly for the quarterfinals.

==== Wind speeds ====
- Heat 1: +5.3 m/s
- Heat 2: +9.8 m/s
- Heat 3: +3.5 m/s
- Heat 4: +5.8 m/s
- Heat 5: +3.0 m/s
- Heat 6: +6.0 m/s
- Heat 7: +5.0 m/s
- Heat 8: +4.3 m/s

Heats results
Rank	Heat	Name	Nationality	Time	Notes
1	1	Eric Bigby	Australia	10.29	Q
2	1	Hasely Crawford	Trinidad and Tobago	10.31	Q
3	1	Lennox Miller	Jamaica	10.46	Q
4	1	Tony Powell	Canada	10.62	Q
5	1	John Williams	Wales	10.67	
6	1	Timon Oyebami	Nigeria	10.77	
7	1	Muhammad Mohddin	Pakistan	10.98	
1	2	Gary Eddy	Australia	10.34	Q
2	2	Lynn Davies	Wales	10.48	Q
3	2	Ian Turnbull	Scotland	10.65	Q
4	2	Abdulai Conteh	Sierra Leone	10.69	Q
5	2	Iqbal Shinwari	Pakistan	10.75	
6	2	Amos Omolo	Uganda	10.76	
7	2	Gaston Clarenc	Mauritius	10.78	
8	2	Bernard Nottage	Bahamas	10.79	
1	3	Don Quarrie	Jamaica	10.43	Q
2	3	William Dralu	Uganda	10.57	Q
3	3	Ronald Jones	Wales	10.62	Q
4	3	John Permal	Pakistan	10.87	Q
5	3	Peter Mamba	Swaziland	11.04	
6	3	Maurice Sweeney	Antigua and Barbuda	11.9	
	3	Ian Gordon	Canada	DNS	
1	4	Ian Green	England	10.46	Q
2	4	Greg Lewis	Australia	10.50	Q
3	4	Jessymon Wishkoti	Zambia	10.61	Q
4	4	Carl Archer	Trinidad and Tobago	10.64	Q
5	4	Kofi Okyir	Ghana	10.69	
6	4	Cuthbert Jacobs	Antigua and Barbuda	11.17	
7	4	Pierre Jallow	Gambia	11.19	
1	5	Errol Stewart	Jamaica	10.45	Q
2	5	Benedict Majekodunmi	Nigeria	10.55	Q
3	5	Brian Green	England	10.62	Q
4	5	Saimoni Tamani	Fiji	10.69	Q
5	5	Canagasabai Kunalan	Singapore	10.71	
6	5	Obedi Mwanga	Tanzania	10.92	
7	5	Vikimbi Radebe	Swaziland	11.74	
1	6	Rocky Symonds	Bermuda	10.25	Q
2	6	Don Halliday	Scotland	10.38	Q
3	6	John Kilpatrick	Northern Ireland	10.49	Q
4	6	James Addy	Ghana	10.57	Q
5	6	Kevin Johnson	Bahamas	10.59	
6	6	Hamadi Saidi	Tanzania	11.13	
7	6	Dodou Joof	Gambia	11.61	
1	7	Kolawole Abdulai	Nigeria	10.32	Q
2	7	Norman Chihota	Tanzania	10.41	Q
3	7	John Harrison	England	10.51	Q
4	7	Bohdan Domansky	Canada	10.56	Q
5	7	Lloyd Giddings	Guyana	10.62	
6	7	Gerard Carson	Northern Ireland	10.73	
7	7	Calvin Greenaway	Antigua and Barbuda	10.93	
1	8	George Daniels	Ghana	10.35	Q
2	8	Les Piggot	Scotland	10.43	Q
3	8	Melvin Wong Shing	Trinidad and Tobago	10.63	Q
4	8	John Oryem	Uganda	10.68	Q
5	8	Mike Sands	Bahamas	10.73	
6	8	Yeo Kian-chye	Singapore	10.79	

=== Quarterfinals ===
Held on 17 July

==== Qualification for semifinals ====
The first 4 in each heat (Q) qualified directly for the semifinals.

==== Wind speed ====
- Heat 1: +6.2 m/s
- Heat 2: +3.4 m/s
- Heat 3: +6.9 m/s
- Heat 4: +5.9 m/s

Quarterfinal results
Rank	Heat	Name	Nationality	Time	Notes
1	1	Errol Stewart	Jamaica	10.30	Q
2	1	Brian Green	England	10.44	Q
3	1	Les Piggot	Scotland	10.47	Q
4	1	Jessymon Wishkoti	Zambia	10.50	Q
5	1	Tony Powell	Canada	10.65	
6	1	Lynn Davies	Wales	10.66	
7	1	John Oryem	Uganda	10.72	
8	1	Eric Bigby	Australia	10.85	
1	2	Don Quarrie	Jamaica	10.29	Q
2	2	Hasely Crawford	Trinidad and Tobago	10.31	Q
3	2	Rocky Symonds	Bermuda	10.34	Q
4	2	Norman Chihota	Tanzania	10.41	Q
5	2	John Harrison	England	10.65	
6	2	Bohdan Domansky	Canada	10.67	
7	2	Abdulai Conteh	Sierra Leone	10.77	
8	2	Ian Turnbull	Scotland	10.82	
1	3	Gary Eddy	Australia	10.25	Q
2	3	Benedict Majekodunmi	Nigeria	10.33	Q
3	3	Don Halliday	Scotland	10.38	Q
4	3	Ian Green	England	10.38	Q
5	3	John Kilpatrick	Northern Ireland	10.53	
6	3	James Addy	Ghana	10.55	
7	3	William Dralu	Uganda	10.56	
8	3	Melvin Wong Shing	Trinidad and Tobago	10.65	
1	4	Lennox Miller	Jamaica	10.27	Q
2	4	Greg Lewis	Australia	10.39	Q
3	4	George Daniels	Ghana	10.39	Q
4	4	Kolawole Abdulai	Nigeria	10.42	Q
5	4	Saimoni Tamani	Fiji	10.55	
6	4	Ronald Jones	Wales	10.56	
7	4	Carl Archer	Trinidad and Tobago	10.69	
8	4	John Permal	Pakistan	10.74	

=== Semifinals ===
Held on 18 July

==== Qualification for final ====
The first 4 in each semifinal (Q) qualified directly for the final.

==== Wind speed ====
- Heat 1: +2.3 m/s
- Heat 2: +4.7 m/s

Semifinal results
Rank	Heat	Name	Nationality	Time	Notes
1	1	Lennox Miller	Jamaica	10.37	Q
2	1	Errol Stewart	Jamaica	10.46	Q
3	1	George Daniels	Ghana	10.47	Q
4	1	Les Piggot	Scotland	10.60	Q
5	1	Greg Lewis	Australia	10.62	
6	1	Benedict Majekodunmi	Nigeria	10.65	
7	1	Brian Green	England	10.69	
8	1	Jessymon Wishkoti	Zambia	10.81	
1	2	Don Quarrie	Jamaica	10.29	Q
2	2	Hasely Crawford	Trinidad and Tobago	10.34	Q
3	2	Gary Eddy	Australia	10.38	Q
4	2	Rocky Symonds	Bermuda	10.39	Q
5	2	Ian Green	England	10.43	
6	2	Kolawole Abdulai	Nigeria	10.51	
7	2	Don Halliday	Scotland	10.52	
8	2	Norman Chihota	Tanzania	10.68	

=== Final ===
Held on 18 July

==== Wind speed ====
+3.6 m/s

Final results
Rank	Lane	Name	Nationality	Time	Notes
1st place, gold medalist(s)	4	Don Quarrie	Jamaica	10.24	
2nd place, silver medalist(s)	7	Lennox Miller	Jamaica	10.32	
3rd place, bronze medalist(s)	5	Hasely Crawford	Trinidad and Tobago	10.33	
4	3	Gary Eddy	Australia	10.34	
5	6	George Daniels	Ghana	10.38	
6	1	Rocky Symonds	Bermuda	10.42	
7	8	Errol Stewart	Jamaica	10.50	
8	2	Les Piggot	Scotland	10.55	
