= Athletics at the 1970 British Commonwealth Games – Men's 200 metres =

Men's 200 metres at the 1970 British Commonwealth Games
- Venue: Meadowbank Stadium, Edinburgh
- Dates: 21 and 22 July 1970

Medalists
| gold medal | Don Quarrie | Jamaica |
| silver medal | Edwin Roberts | Trinidad and Tobago |
| bronze medal | Charles Asati | Kenya |

The men's 200 metres event at the 1970 British Commonwealth Games was held on 21 and 22 July at the Meadowbank Stadium in Edinburgh, Scotland. It was the first time that the metric distance was contested at the Games replacing the 220 yards event.

== Medalists ==
Medallists
| Gold | Silver | Bronze |
|---|---|---|
| Don Quarrie; Jamaica | Edwin Roberts; Trinidad and Tobago | Charles Asati; Kenya |

== Results ==
=== Heats ===
Held on 21 July

==== Qualification for quarterfinals ====
The first 4 in each heat (Q) qualified directly for the quarterfinals.

==== Wind speed ====
Heat 1: ? m/s, Heat 2: +3.1 m/s, Heat 3: ? m/s, Heat 4: ? m/s, Heat 5: +5.3 m/s, Heat 6: ? m/s, Heat 7: ? m/s, Heat 8: +5.8 m/s

Heats results
| Rank | Heat | Name | Nationality | Time | Notes |
|---|---|---|---|---|---|
| 1 | 1 | Edwin Roberts | Trinidad and Tobago | 20.6 | Q |
| 2 | 1 | Julius Sang | Kenya | 20.9 | Q |
| 3 | 1 | Stuart Bell | Scotland | 21.3 | Q |
| 4 | 1 | Amos Odelusi | Nigeria | 21.6 | Q |
| 5 | 1 | Joseph Chivers | Northern Ireland | 21.6 | |
| 6 | 1 | Bernard Nottage | Bahamas | 21.9 | |
| 7 | 1 | Peter Ndovi | Malawi | 22.9 | |
| 1 | 2 | Charles Asati | Kenya | 20.5 | Q |
| 2 | 2 | Martin Reynolds | England | 20.8 | Q |
| 3 | 2 | Gary Eddy | Australia | 21.06 | Q |
| 4 | 2 | Rocky Symonds | Bermuda | 21.5 | Q |
| 5 | 2 | Zuku Tofile | Swaziland | 22.6 | |
| | 2 | Mike Sands | Bahamas | DNF | |
| | 2 | John Oryem | Uganda | DNF | |
| | 2 | Lloyd Giddings | Guyana | DNS | |
| 1 | 3 | George Daniels | Ghana | 21.0 | Q |
| 2 | 3 | Melvin Wong Shing | Trinidad and Tobago | 21.4 | Q |
| 3 | 3 | John Williams | Wales | 21.4 | Q |
| 4 | 3 | Norman Chihota | Tanzania | 21.5 | Q |
| 5 | 3 | Carl Lawson | Jamaica | 21.7 | |
| 6 | 3 | Brian Cowley | Isle of Man | 22.9 | |
| 7 | 3 | Anthony Perera | Gibraltar | 23.3 | |
| | 3 | Canagasabai Kunalan | Singapore | DNS | |
| 1 | 4 | Ralph Banthorpe | England | 21.3 | Q |
| 2 | 4 | Kevin Johnson | Bahamas | 21.3 | Q |
| 3 | 4 | Horace Levy | Jamaica | 21.4 | Q |
| 4 | 4 | Kofi Okyir | Ghana | 21.9 | Q |
| 5 | 4 | Ghulam Qadir | Pakistan | 22.9 | |
| 6 | 4 | Pierre Jallow | Gambia | 23.2 | |
| 1 | 5 | Peter Norman | Australia | 20.87 | Q |
| 2 | 5 | Jessymon Wishkoti | Zambia | 21.6 | Q |
| 3 | 5 | Tony Powell | Canada | 21.6 | Q |
| 4 | 5 | Terry Davies | Wales | 21.8 | Q |
| 5 | 5 | Peter Mamba | Swaziland | 22.3 | |
| 6 | 5 | Obedi Mwanga | Tanzania | 22.7 | |
| 1 | 6 | Don Quarrie | Jamaica | 20.8 | Q |
| 2 | 6 | Dave Dear | England | 21.3 | Q |
| 3 | 6 | William Dralu | Uganda | 21.5 | Q |
| 4 | 6 | Carl Archer | Trinidad and Tobago | 21.6 | Q |
| 5 | 6 | Yeo Kian Chye | Singapore | 21.9 | |
| 6 | 6 | Cuthbert Jacobs | Antigua and Barbuda | 22.0 | |
| 7 | 6 | Gaston Clarenc | Mauritius | 24.4 | |
| | 6 | Les Piggot | Scotland | DNS | |
| 1 | 7 | Robert Ojo | Nigeria | 21.6 | Q |
| 2 | 7 | Howard Davies | Wales | 21.8 | Q |
| 3 | 7 | Hezekiah Nyamau | Kenya | 21.8 | Q |
| 4 | 7 | Doug Chapman | Canada | 21.9 | Q |
| 5 | 7 | Dodou Joof | Gambia | 22.5 | |
| 6 | 7 | Francisco Mvula | Malawi | 22.7 | |
| 7 | 7 | Maurice Sweeney | Antigua and Barbuda | 23.9 | |
| 1 | 8 | Greg Lewis | Australia | 21.41 | Q |
| 2 | 8 | Edward Owusu | Ghana | 21.6 | Q |
| 3 | 8 | Don Halliday | Scotland | 21.6 | Q |
| 4 | 8 | Bohdan Domansky | Canada | 21.7 | Q |
| 5 | 8 | Muhammad Mohddin | Pakistan | 22.4 | |
| 6 | 8 | Omubo Peters | Nigeria | 22.7 | |
| | 8 | Calvin Greenaway | Antigua and Barbuda | DNS | |
| | 8 | Vikimbi Radebe | Swaziland | DNS | |

=== Quarterfinals ===
Held on 21 July

==== Qualification for semifinals ====
The first 4 in each heat (Q) qualified directly for the semifinals.

==== Wind speed ====
Heat 1: +7.7 m/s, Heat 2: ? m/s, Heat 3: +6.9 m/s, Heat 4: +4.9 m/s

Quarterfinals results
| Rank | Heat | Name | Nationality | Time | Notes |
|---|---|---|---|---|---|
| 1 | 1 | Charles Asati | Kenya | 20.6 | Q |
| 2 | 1 | Peter Norman | Australia | 20.79 | Q |
| 3 | 1 | Melvin Wong Shing | Trinidad and Tobago | 21.1 | Q |
| 4 | 1 | Doug Chapman | Canada | 21.2 | Q |
| 5 | 1 | Norman Chihota | Tanzania | 21.3 | |
| 6 | 1 | Howard Davies | Wales | 21.3 | |
| 7 | 1 | William Dralu | Uganda | 21.6 | |
| 8 | 1 | Kofi Okyir | Ghana | 22.9 | |
| 1 | 2 | Edwin Roberts | Trinidad and Tobago | 20.8 | Q |
| 2 | 2 | Dave Dear | England | 21.1 | Q |
| 3 | 2 | Rocky Symonds | Bermuda | 21.2 | Q |
| 4 | 2 | Julius Sang | Kenya | 21.3 | Q |
| 5 | 2 | Bohdan Domansky | Canada | 21.5 | |
| 6 | 2 | Edward Owusu | Ghana | 21.6 | |
| 7 | 2 | Terry Davies | Wales | 21.8 | |
| 8 | 2 | Robert Ojo | Nigeria | 21.9 | |
| 1 | 3 | Martin Reynolds | England | 20.8 | Q |
| 2 | 3 | George Daniels | Ghana | 20.9 | Q |
| 3 | 3 | Gary Eddy | Australia | 21.06 | Q |
| 4 | 3 | Stuart Bell | Scotland | 21.4 | Q |
| 5 | 3 | Horace Levy | Jamaica | 21.4 | |
| 6 | 3 | Hezekiah Nyamau | Kenya | 21.7 | |
| 7 | 3 | Carl Archer | Trinidad and Tobago | 21.9 | |
| 8 | 3 | Amos Odelusi | Nigeria | 22.1 | |
| 1 | 4 | Don Quarrie | Jamaica | 20.4 | Q |
| 2 | 4 | Greg Lewis | Australia | 21.03 | Q |
| 3 | 4 | Tony Powell | Canada | 21.1 | Q |
| 4 | 4 | Ralph Banthorpe | England | 21.1 | Q |
| 5 | 4 | Don Halliday | Scotland | 21.2 | |
| 6 | 4 | Kevin Johnson | Bahamas | 21.3 | |
| 7 | 4 | John Williams | Wales | 21.5 | |
| 8 | 4 | Jessymon Wishkoti | Zambia | 21.7 | |

=== Semifinals ===
Held on 22 July

==== Qualification for final ====
The first 4 in each semifinal (Q) qualified directly for the final.

==== Wind speed ====
Heat 1: +4.6 m/s, Heat 2: +3.0 m/s

Semifinals results
| Rank | Heat | Name | Nationality | Time | Notes |
|---|---|---|---|---|---|
| 1 | 1 | Martin Reynolds | England | 20.61 | Q |
| 2 | 1 | Edwin Roberts | Trinidad and Tobago | 20.7 | Q |
| 3 | 1 | Charles Asati | Kenya | 20.8 | Q |
| 4 | 1 | Julius Sang | Kenya | 20.9 | Q |
| 5 | 1 | Greg Lewis | Australia | 21.03 | |
| 6 | 1 | Ralph Banthorpe | England | 21.3 | |
| 7 | 1 | Doug Chapman | Canada | 21.6 | |
| | 1 | Rocky Symonds | Bermuda | DNS | |
| 1 | 2 | Don Quarrie | Jamaica | 20.7 | Q |
| 2 | 2 | Gary Eddy | Australia | 20.89 | Q |
| 3 | 2 | Peter Norman | Australia | 20.95 | Q |
| 4 | 2 | George Daniels | Ghana | 20.9 | Q |
| 5 | 2 | Dave Dear | England | 21.08 | |
| 6 | 2 | Tony Powell | Canada | 21.3 | |
| 7 | 2 | Melvin Wong Shing | Trinidad and Tobago | 21.4 | |
| 8 | 2 | Stuart Bell | Scotland | 21.5 | |

=== Final ===
Held on 22 July

==== Wind speed ====
+1.7 m/s

Final results
| Rank | Lane | Name | Nationality | Time | Notes |
|---|---|---|---|---|---|
| 1st place, gold medalist(s) | 3 | Don Quarrie | Jamaica | 20.56 | =GR |
| 2nd place, silver medalist(s) | 7 | Edwin Roberts | Trinidad and Tobago | 20.69 | |
| 3rd place, bronze medalist(s) | 8 | Charles Asati | Kenya | 20.74 | |
| 4 | 4 | Martin Reynolds | England | 20.83 | |
| 5 | 2 | Peter Norman | Australia | 20.86 | |
| 6 | 6 | George Daniels | Ghana | 20.9 | |
| 7 | 1 | Gary Eddy | Australia | 21.01 | |
| 8 | 5 | Julius Sang | Kenya | 21.0 | |
