= Carl Lawson (sprinter) =

Jamaican sprinter (born 1947)

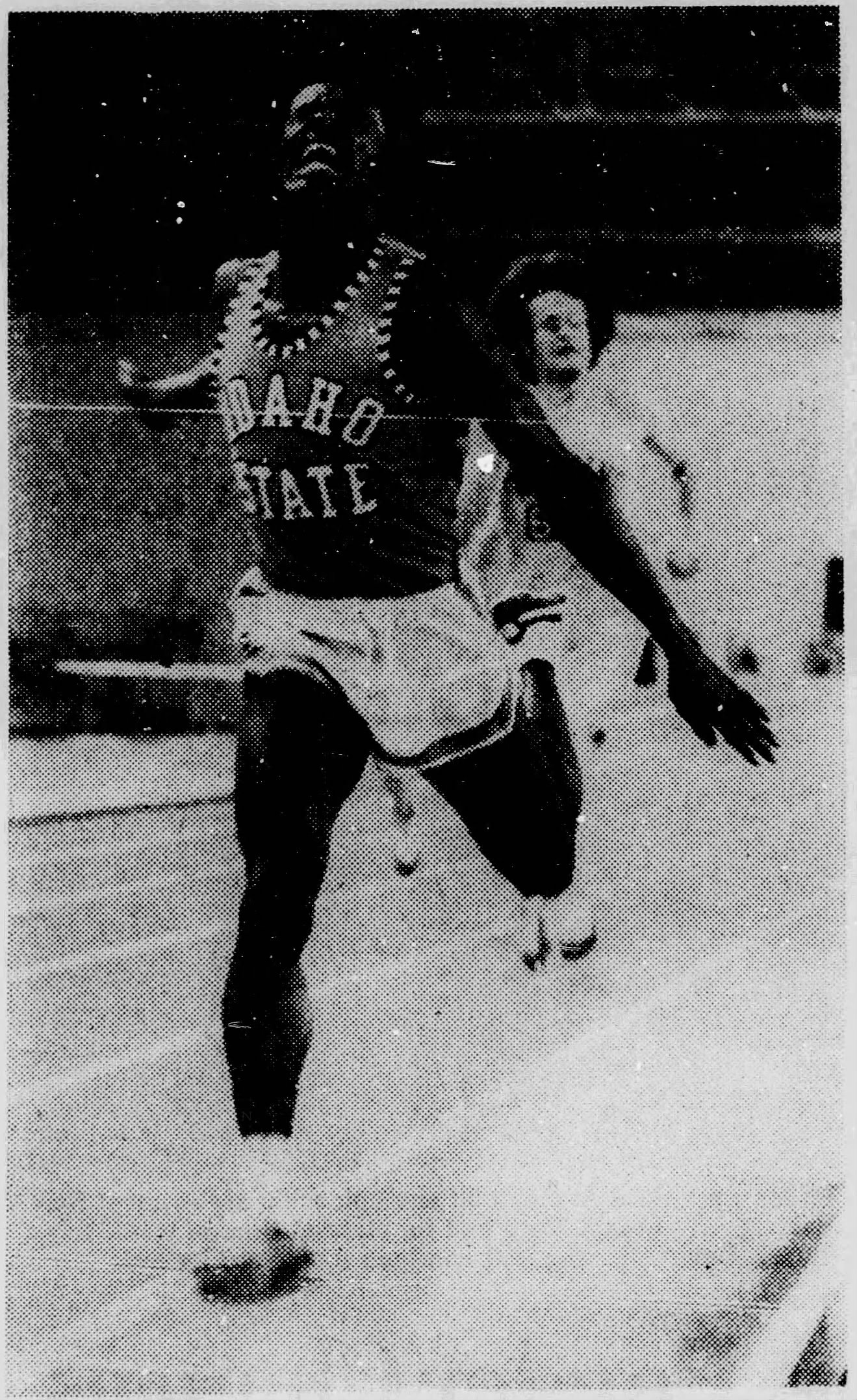
- Lawson in 1972

Personal information
- Full name: Carl Anthony Lawson
- Born: 27 October 1947 (age 79)

Sport
- Country: Jamaica
- Sport: Athletics
- Event: 200 metres

Achievements and titles
- Personal bests: 100 y: 9.3 i (1971, =WR); 220 y: 21.1 i (1974, WR); 4×220 y: 1:26.9 i (1971, WR); SMR: 1:31.4 i (1974, WR)
Medal record
Men's athletics
Representing Jamaica
Commonwealth Games
Gold medal – first place	1970 Edinburgh	4 × 100 m relay
Pan American Games
Gold medal – first place	1971 Cali	4 × 100 m relay
Central American and Caribbean Championships
Gold medal – first place	1971 Kingston	4 × 100 m relay
Gold medal – first place	1973 Maracaibo	4 × 100 m relay
Bronze medal – third place	1973 Maracaibo	100 m

Carl Anthony Lawson (born 27 October 1947) is a Jamaican former sprinter. Running for Holmwood Tech, SC Bayer 05, and Idaho State University, Lawson broke indoor world records in four events during his career, including the 220 yards indoor world record in 1974. He won gold medals in the 4 × 100 metres relay at the Commonwealth Games, Pan American Games, and Central American and Caribbean Championships. Lawson was selected to represent Jamaica at the 1972 Summer Olympics, but withdrew from the competition due to an emergency appendectomy the night before his first race.

== Career ==
=== Early career ===
Lawson was born on 27 October 1947. As a youth he competed for Holmwood Technical High School. While studying in Krefeld, West Germany, he was a member of the SC Bayer-05 athletics club. He competed in Europe during the summer of 1969, winning a 100 metres race in Mettmann, Germany, on 12 July.

Lawson entered the 200 metres and 4 × 100 metres relay at the 1970 Commonwealth Games. He finished 5th in his 200 m heat and did not advance, but he won his 4 × 100 m heat and advanced to the finals in that event. In the relay finals, he won the gold medal as the third leg, with his team setting a new Commonwealth Games record time of 39.46 seconds. During a Jamaica v. Sweden dual meet, Lawson won the 100 yards and 220 yards events in 9.4 and 20.6 seconds respectively. He was originally earmarked to run for a United States junior college along with three other Jamaicans, but the coach left the school. The coach recommended Lawson to Bob Beeten of the Idaho State Bengals track and field team, and Beeten offered Lawson the opportunity to run for Idaho State.

=== Idaho State University ===
In 1971, Lawson began competing for the Idaho State Bengals track and field team as a freshman. He joined the team at 5 ft 10 in (1.78 m) and 135 pounds (61 kg) with a 100 yards best of 9.3 seconds and a 220 yards best of 20.5 seconds. In January 1971, Lawson set the American all-comer's record of 30.4 seconds in the indoor 300 yards, which would have equaled the American indoor record had he not been a Jamaican citizen. The following month, Lawson broke the school's indoor 100 yards record by running 9.4 seconds, equaling the American record despite a slow start. His mark was later amended to 9.3 seconds after Track and Field News advised that because two watches recorded 9.3 and only one recorded 9.4 seconds, the faster time should have been used – meaning Lawson had equaled the world indoor record. One week later, he broke the world record in the indoor 220 yards at the 1971 Simplot Games, running 21.4 seconds. The time was slower than John Carlos' 21.2 indoor best, but Carlos' time was not considered record-eligible as it was run on a dirt track. Lawson also broke the indoor 4 × 220 yards relay world record in 1:26.9 minutes, but the team was later disqualified for a faulty pass. On their second attempt at the 1971 Big Sky Conference indoor championships, the team ran 1:26.9 again to officially break the record, with Lawson running a 21.4-second first leg. The American indoor 300 yards record he equaled was later broken that same season by Cliff Branch, who split 30.2 seconds. Lawson ended his indoor season with a 48.3-second school record in the 440 yards in his first time running the event.

During an outdoor meet on 3 April, Lawson ran a 9.4 100 yards time to set a school record despite running into a headwind. The mark also tied the Big Sky Conference record. At the 1971 Big Sky Conference outdoor championships, Lawson won his 100 yards heat and then broke the conference record in the finals, running 9.3 seconds – the fastest time ever run in Montana. He also broke the conference 220 yards record, running 20.6 seconds. At the 1971 USA–USSR Track and Field Dual Meet Series, Lawson teamed with Alfred Daley, Don Quarrie, and Lennox Miller to form a Jamaican "World All-Stars" team that beat both the U.S. and USSR to win the 4 × 100 m relay.

Lawson won the 1971 Jamaican Athletics Championships in the 200 m. At the 1971 Central American and Caribbean Championships, Lawson finished 4th in the 200 metres and won the 4 × 100 m gold medal, setting a championship record of 39.2 seconds. He advanced to the 200 m finals at the 1971 Pan American Games, where he finished 5th. In the 4 × 100 m finals, Lawson won another gold medal running second leg for the Jamaican team.

=== 1972 Olympics ===
Lawson was considered a probable favorite to make the 1972 Jamaican Olympic team. He traveled to California to compete at the Modesto Relays in a bid to increase his chance for Olympic selection. Lawson repeated as the 1972 Big Sky Champion in the 100 and 220 yards but failed to make either final at the 1972 NCAA Division I Outdoor Track and Field Championships. He finished runner-up in the 100 m at the 1972 Jamaican Olympic trials behind Errol Stewart, and was selected to the nation's Olympic 100 m and 4 × 100 m teams. As late as the day before the Olympic 100 m heats, he was expected to compete. But that night, he developed appendicitis and had to receive an emergency appendectomy the night before his heat. Lawson ultimately did not participate in any Olympic races.

Lawson had begun to feel stomach pains five to six days earlier, but it was alleged that athletes and officials prevented him from seeing the team doctor. Even after his hospital visit, the team doctor informed the press that Lawson could still run. As Don Quarrie was also unavailable and Errol Stewart had a rheumatic fever, Jamaica was unable to field a 4 × 100 m team at the Games.

=== Junior and senior years ===
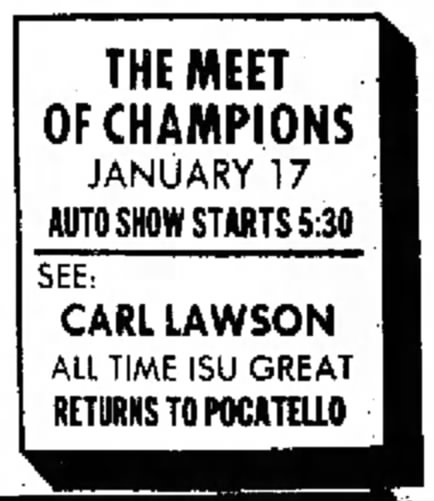
Advertisement for Carl Lawson at the 1975 Idaho State Meet of Champions

During the 1973 indoor season, Lawson set a school record 6.0 seconds over 60 yards. At the 1973 NCAA Division I Indoor Track and Field Championships, Lawson finished 4th in the 60 yards. He set U.S.-leading mark of 9.3 in the 100 yards during the regular season outdoors. Going into the 1973 Big Sky Championships, Lawson was rated as the top sprinter in the nation for that year. He ran wind-aided times of 9.2 and 19.9 seconds to sweep the 100 and 220 yards, leading Idaho State to the conference team title in a feat that was described as the most impressive performance in the world that season to date. Lawson finished 3rd in a six-way dead heat in the 100 yards at the 1973 NCAA University Division Outdoor Track and Field Championships, running 9.54 seconds. At the 1973 Central American and Caribbean Championships, Lawson entered the 100 m and 4 × 100 m relay. He won a bronze medal in the 100 m and gold as the third leg in the Jamaican relay team.

In January 1974, Lawson competed individually in the 100 metres and 200 metres at the Commonwealth Games in Christchurch, New Zealand. He was runner-up in his 100 m heat but 7th in his semi-final and did not advance. In the 200 m, Lawson was 3rd in his heat and 8th in his semi-final. He returned to Idaho to help set a world indoor best in the sprint medley relay (with legs of 110 yards, 110 yards, 220 yards, and 440 yards). Lawson ran the 220 yards leg and contributed to a 1:31.4-minute clocking that broke Stanford University's 1:32.5 record.

On 2 March 1974, Lawson broke the men's 220 yards indoor world record at the U.S. Intermountain Track and Field Federation Championships, running 21.1 seconds to beat both his own and John Carlos' 21.2 dirt track indoor best. The mark was also counted as a 200 metres indoor world record. He led Idaho State to another team title at his final Big Sky championships, winning the 100 yards, 220 yards, and anchoring the winning 4 × 110 yards relay. He was named co-athlete of the meet. He returned to Pocatello in 1975 to compete representing Jamaica. He won the 300 yards at the 1975 Idaho State Meet of Champions meet.

== Personal life ==
Lawson is from southeastern Kingston, Jamaica, where he attended boarding school. He originally played association football but switched to track because he said "it was dangerous getting kicked and all that". Before coming to the United States for college, he spent time in West Germany on a Jamaican industrial scholarship to study electrical power plants, during which time he also visited Romania. He then studied engineering at Idaho State University, where he was president of the International Students Association and received an award from the Association of Black Students. Lawson majored in nuclear science and was the vice president of the Engineering Fraternity in addition to being a member of the school's athletic committee. He was also a student curriculum advisor. In four years at Idaho State, he never missed a track practice. He was hosted by Muriel and Donald Roberts in Pocatello.

Lawson lamented the commercialization of the Olympics, saying they were "not what they used to be" since they began to be televised. He also expressed disagreements with the requirement of amateurism at the time. He was accustomed to traveling and did not become homesick at Idaho, though he found it difficult to adjust to the weather and high altitude. He accepted a graduate fellowship at the University of Oklahoma, for which he won a $1,000 scholarship from the NCAA. In 1984, he was inducted into the Idaho State University Sports Hall of Fame.

Lawson has several relatives also named Carl Lawson. His grand-nephew Carl Lawson is an NFL defensive end for the Cincinnati Bengals. His grand-nephew's father was a football player for the 1990 Georgia Tech national championship-winning team.
