= Peter Norman =

Australian sprinter (1942–2006)

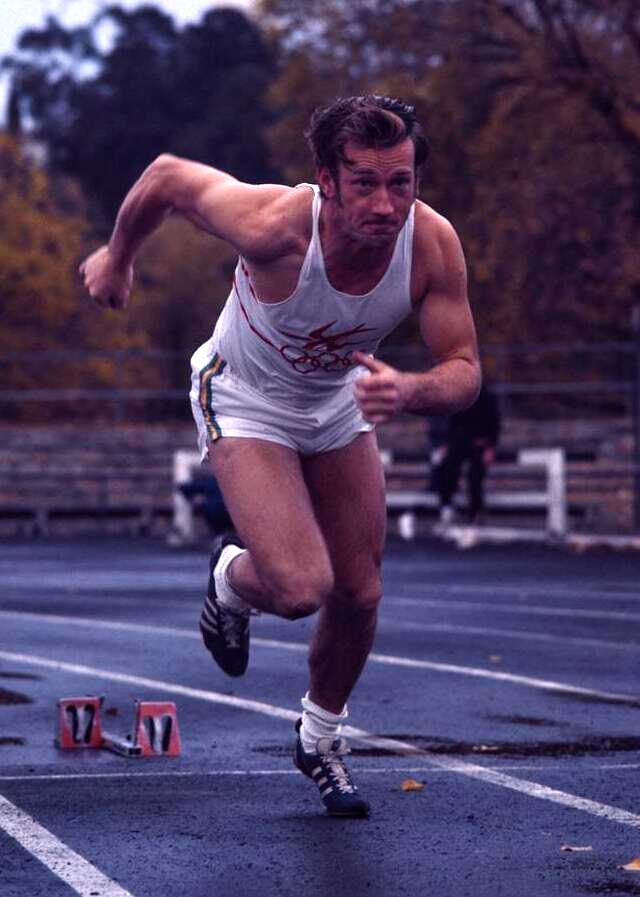
- Norman in 1970

Personal information
- Full name: Peter George Norman
- Born: 15 June 1942 Coburg, Victoria, Australia
- Died: 3 October 2006 (aged 64) Melbourne, Victoria, Australia
- Height: 1.78 m (5 ft 10 in)
- Weight: 73 kg (161 lb)

Sport
- Country: Australia
- Sport: Athletics
- Event: Sprint
- Club: East Melbourne Harriers

Achievements and titles
- Personal bests: 20.06 s (200 m, 1968)
Medal record
Men's athletics
Representing Australia
Olympic Games
Silver medal – second place	1968 Mexico City	200 metres
British Empire and Commonwealth Games
Bronze medal – third place	1966 Kingston	4×110 yards relay

Peter George Norman (15 June 1942 – 3 October 2006) was an Australian track athlete. He won the silver medal in the 200 metres at the 1968 Summer Olympics in Mexico City, with a time of 20.06 seconds, which remained the Oceania 200 m record for more than 56 years. He was a five-time national 200-metre champion.

Norman was one of the three athletes in the 1968 Olympics protest salute photograph taken during the medal ceremony for the 200-metre event. He knew the salute was to occur and wore a badge of the Olympic Project for Human Rights in support of fellow athletes John Carlos and Tommie Smith.

== Early life ==
Norman grew up in a devout Salvation Army family, living in Coburg, a suburb of Melbourne in Victoria. Initially an apprentice butcher, Norman later became a teacher, and worked for the Victorian Department of Sport and Recreation towards the end of his life.

During his athletics career, Norman was coached by Neville Sillitoe.

== Career ==
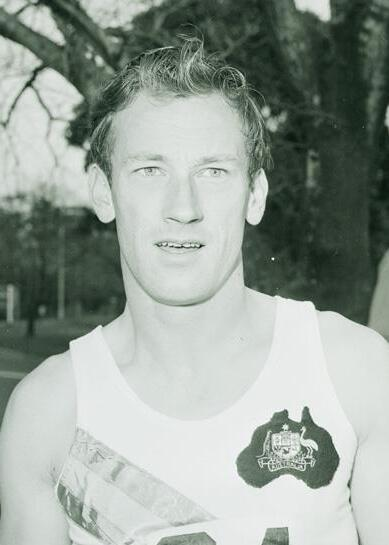
Norman in 1968

=== 1968 Summer Olympics ===
The 200 metres event at the 1968 Olympics started on 15 October and finished on 16 October; Norman won his heat in a time of 20.17 seconds, which was briefly an Olympic record. He won his quarter-final and was second in the semi-final.

On the morning of 16 October, US athlete Tommie Smith won the 200-metre final with a world-record time of 19.83 seconds. Norman finished second in a time of 20.06 s after passing U.S. athlete John Carlos at the finish line. Carlos ran 20.10 s.

=== Later career ===
Norman represented Australia at the 1969 Pacific Conference Games in Tokyo, and the 1970 Commonwealth Games in Edinburgh.

The Australian Olympic Committee maintains that Norman was not selected for the 1972 Munich Olympics because he did not meet the selection standard of equalling or bettering the IOC qualifying standard (20.9) and performing credibly at the 1972 Australian Athletics Championships at which he finished third behind Greg Lewis and Gary Eddy in a time of 21.6.

He played 67 games for West Brunswick Australian rules football club from 1972 to 1977 before coaching an under-19 team in 1978 (Before the 1968 Olympics, he is said to have been a trainer for West Brunswick as a way of keeping fit over winter during the athletics off-season).

In 1985, Norman contracted gangrene after tearing his Achilles tendon during a charity race, which nearly led to his leg being amputated. Depression, heavy drinking and painkiller addiction followed.

After battling depression, Norman worked at Athletics Australia as a sports administrator until 2006.

== Death ==
Norman died of a heart attack on 3 October 2006 in Melbourne at the age of 64. The US Track and Field Federation proclaimed 9 October 2006, the date of his funeral, as Peter Norman Day. Thirty-eight years after the three first made history, both Smith and Carlos gave eulogies and were pallbearers at Norman's funeral. At the time of his death, Norman was survived by his second wife, Jan, and their daughters. Additionally, he was survived by his first wife, Ruth, and their children and grandchildren.

== Black power salute ==
=== Medal ceremony ===
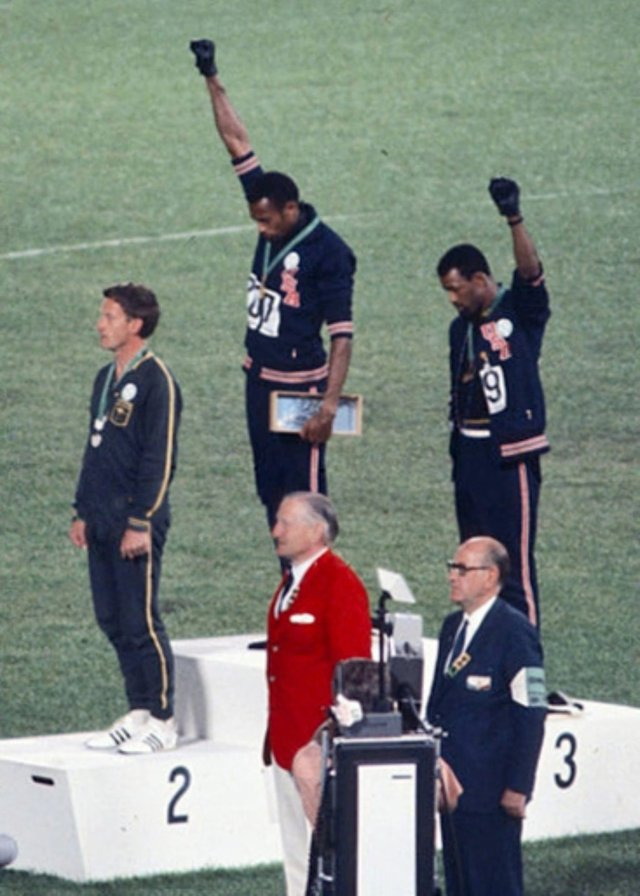
The Black Power salute by Tommie Smith (center) and John Carlos (right). Norman (left) wears an OPHR badge in solidarity with them.

On the medal podium after the medal presentation by David Cecil, 6th Marquess of Exeter and during the playing of the US anthem, "The Star-Spangled Banner", Tommie Smith and John Carlos performed a Black Power salute (which Tommie Smith later described in his 2007 autobiography as a human rights salute, rather than an outright Black Power salute).

Norman wore a badge on the podium in support of the Olympic Project for Human Rights (OPHR). After the final, Carlos and Smith had told Norman what they were planning to do during the ceremony. Journalist Martin Flanagan wrote: "They asked Norman if he believed in human rights. He said he did. They asked him if he believed in God. Norman, who came from a Salvation Army background, said he believed strongly in God. We knew that what we were going to do was far greater than any athletic feat. He said, 'I'll stand with you'. Carlos said he expected to see fear in Norman's eyes. He didn't; 'I saw love'." On the way to the medal ceremony, Norman saw the OPHR badge being worn by Paul Hoffman, a white member of the US rowing team, and asked him if he could wear it. It was Norman who suggested that Smith and Carlos share the black gloves used in their salute, after Carlos left his pair at the Olympic Village. This is the reason Smith raised a gloved right fist and Carlos raised his gloved left.

=== Treatment between 1968–1972 ===
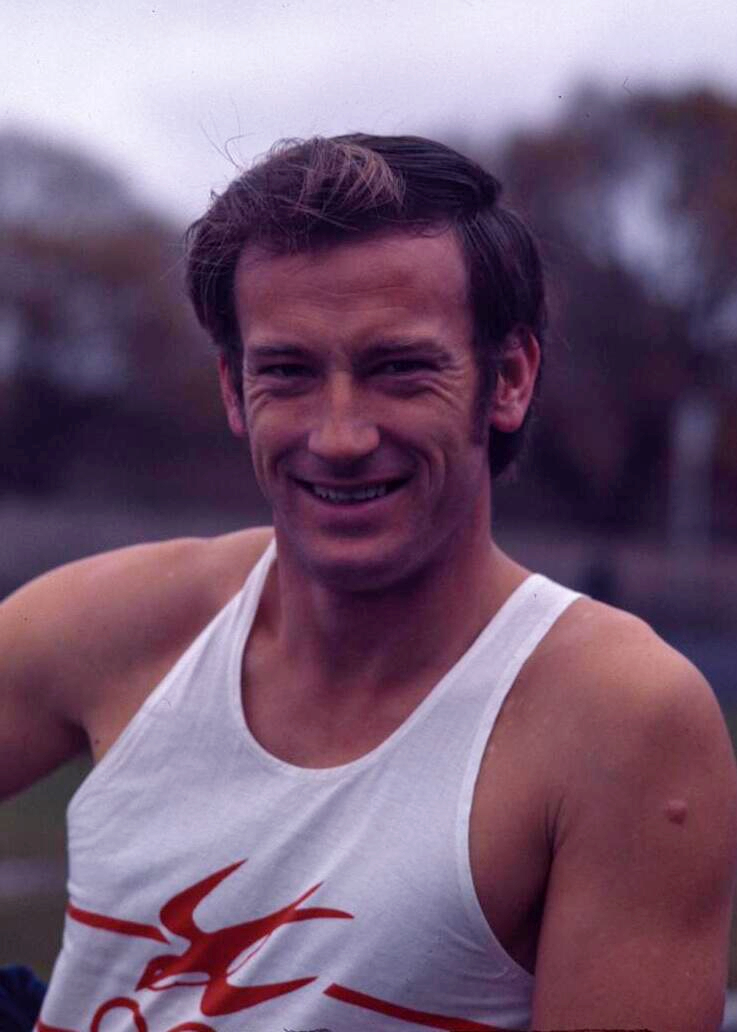
Norman in 1970

Various commentary has claimed that, after the 1968 Olympics, Norman's career suffered greatly, e.g., a 2012 CNN profile said that "he returned home to Australia a pariah, suffering unofficial sanction and ridicule as the Black Power salute's forgotten man. He never ran in the Olympics again." Norman represented Australia at the smaller-scale 1969 Pacific Conference Games in Tokyo, winning the gold medal over 200 metres, and the 1970 Commonwealth Games in Edinburgh before finishing his career.

Various commentators say he was not selected for the Olympic Games in Munich in 1972 despite recording qualifying times, but the Australian Olympic Committee maintains that Norman was not selected for the 1972 Olympics because he did not meet the selection standard of equalling or bettering the Olympic qualifying standard (20.9) and performing creditably at the Australian Athletics Championships. Norman ran several qualifying times from 1969 to 1971 but he finished third in the 1972 Australian Athletics Championships behind Greg Lewis and Gary Eddy in a time of 21.6.

Contemporaneous reports show mixed opinion on whether Norman should have been sent to the Munich Olympics. After coming third in the trials, Norman commented: "All I had to do was to win, even in a slow time, and I think I would have been off to Munich". The Age correspondent wrote Norman "probably ran himself out of the team at the National titles"—yet also noted he was injured—and continued, "If the selectors do the right thing, Norman should still be on the plane to Munich." On the other hand, Australasian Amateur Athletics' magazine stated "The dilemma for selectors here was how could they select Norman and not Lewis. Pity that Peter did not win because that would have been the only requirement for a Munich ticket".

=== Recognition ===
For his involvement as an ally in the 1968 Olympics Black Power salute protest, Norman has appeared in many works of public art, as well as movies on the subject.

- An airbrush mural of the trio on podium was painted in 2000 in the inner-city suburb of Newtown in Sydney. (Note: Mural at 39, Pine Street, Newtown, New South Wales, Australia.) Silvio Offria, who allowed an artist known only as "Donald" to paint the mural on his house in Leamington Lane, said that Norman came to see the mural: "He came and had his photo taken, he was very happy." The monochrome tribute, captioned "THREE PROUD PEOPLE MEXICO 68", was under threat of demolition in 2010 to make way for a rail tunnel but is now listed as an item of heritage significance.
- On 17 October 2005, San Jose State University unveiled a statue, titled Victory Salute, commemorating the 1968 Olympic protest. Norman was not included as part of the statue itself, as he insisted that his place be left unoccupied so that others viewing the statue could "take a stand" against racism; however, he was invited to deliver a speech at the ceremony.
- John Carlos and Tommie Smith were invited by Norman's family to read eulogies at his funeral on October 9, 2006, and also served as pallbearers.
- Norman's nephew Matt Norman directed, produced, and wrote the documentary film Salute (2008), about him and his role in the 1968 Olympics Black Power salute. Paul Byrnes, in his Sydney Morning Herald review of Salute, said that the documentary makes it clear why Norman stood with the other two athletes. Byrnes writes, "He was a devout Christian, raised in the Salvation Army [and] believed passionately in equality for all, regardless of colour, creed or religion—the Olympic code". In October 2018, Matt Norman with the help of journalist Andrew Webster released his uncle's official biography The Peter Norman Story.
- In September 2016, a statue of Norman on the 1968 medal podium with Smith and Carlos was unveiled at the National Museum of African American History and Culture in Washington, D.C.
- During the building of Lakeside Stadium in Melbourne, Athletics Australia in partnership with the Victorian Government announced the erecting of a bronze statue of Norman to honour Norman's legacy as an athlete and advocate for human rights. They will also enshrine 9 October as Peter Norman Day within their organisation. It was unveiled on 9 October 2019 at the Albert Park athletics track, Melbourne.

=== Posthumous apology ===
In August 2012, the Australian House of Representatives debated a motion to provide a posthumous apology to Norman. The chamber passed an official apology motion on 11 October 2012, which read:

15 PETER NORMAN

The order of the day having been read for the resumption of the debate on the motion of Dr Leigh— That this House:

(1) recognises the extraordinary athletic achievements of the late Peter Norman, who won the silver medal in the 200 metres sprint running event at the 1968 Mexico City Olympics, in a time of 20.06 seconds, which still stands as the Australian record;
(2) acknowledges the bravery of Peter Norman in donning an Olympic Project for Human Rights badge on the podium, in solidarity with African-American athletes Tommie Smith and John Carlos, who gave the 'black power' salute;
(3) apologises to Peter Norman for the treatment he received upon his return to Australia, and the failure to fully recognise his inspirational role before his untimely death in 2006; and
(4) belatedly recognises the powerful role that Peter Norman played in furthering racial equality.

The original plan for the apology had point (3) state that the House: 'apologises to Peter Norman for the wrong done by Australia in failing to send him to the 1972 Munich Olympics, despite repeatedly qualifying'. This acknowledgement of a punitive reaction by Australia to his support of Smith and Carlos was omitted from the final apology.

In a 2012 interview advocating for the apology, Carlos said:

There's no-one in the nation of Australia that should be honoured, recognised, appreciated more than Peter Norman for his humanitarian concerns, his character, his strength and his willingness to be a sacrificial lamb for justice.

After the parliamentary apology, the Australian Olympic Committee (AOC) and others disputed the claims made about Norman being ostracised for supporting Carlos and Smith. The AOC did not believe that Norman was owed an apology, citing the following:

- Norman was cautioned by the AOC but not punished. Chef de Mission Judy Patching cautioned him on the evening of the medal ceremony and then gave Norman as many tickets as he wanted to go and watch a field hockey match.
- Norman was not selected for the 1972 Munich Olympics, as he did not meet the selection standard which entailed an athlete equalling or bettering the Olympic qualifying standard (20.9) and performing creditably at the Australian Athletics Championships. Norman ran several qualifying times from 1969 to 1971, but he finished third in the 1972 Australian Athletics Championships behind Greg Lewis and Gary Eddy in a time of 21.6.
- In the lead-up to the 2000 Sydney Olympics, the AOC stated "Norman was involved in numerous Olympic events in his home city of Melbourne. He announced several teams for the AOC in Melbourne and was on the stage in his Mexico 1968 blazer congratulating athletes. He was acknowledged as an Olympian and the AOC valued his contribution." Due to cost considerations, the AOC did not have the resources to bring all Australian Olympians to Sydney, and Norman was offered the same chance to buy tickets as other Australian Olympians. However, the United States invited him to participate and take part in the 2000 Sydney Olympics when they heard that his own country had failed to do so.

In 2018, the AOC awarded Norman posthumously the Order of Merit for his involvement of the 1968 protest, with AOC President John Coates stating: "I'm absolutely certain from all the history I've read that we didn't do the wrong thing by him. But I absolutely think we've been negligent in not recognising the role he played back then."

== Competitive record ==
=== International competitions ===
Year	Competition	Venue	Position	Event	Notes
1962	Commonwealth Games	Perth, Western Australia	6th S/F 1; 12/43	220 yards	21.8(22.03)(−2.8)
1966	Commonwealth Games	Kingston, Jamaica	6th Q/F; 29/54	100 yards	10.2(10.27)(−5.0)
1966	Commonwealth Games	Kingston, Jamaica	6th S/F 1; 10/56	220 yards	21.2(0.0)
1966	Commonwealth Games	Kingston, Jamaica	3rd	4×110 yards	40.0
1966	Commonwealth Games	Kingston, Jamaica	5th	4×440 yards	3:12.2
1968	Olympic Games	Mexico City, Mexico	2nd	200 m	20.0 (20.06)(+0.9)
1969	Pacific Conference Games	Tokyo, Japan	4th	100 m	10.8(−0.1)
1969	Pacific Conference Games	Tokyo, Japan	1st	200 m	21.0(−0.1)
1969	Pacific Conference Games	Tokyo, Japan	1st	4 × 100 m	40.8
1970	Commonwealth Games	Edinburgh, Scotland	5th	200 m	20.86(+1.7)
1970	Commonwealth Games	Edinburgh, Scotland	DNF Heat1; 14th	4 × 100 m	Dropped baton

=== National championships ===
Year	Competition	Venue	Position	Event	Notes
1965/66	Australian Championships	Perth, Western Australia	1st	200 m	20.9 (−1.2)
1966/67	Australian Championships	Adelaide, South Australia	1st	200 m	21.3
1967/68	Australian Championships	Sydney, New South Wales	1st	200 m	20.5 (0.0)
1968/69	Australian Championships	Melbourne, Victoria	2nd	100 m	10.6 (−0.5)
1968/69	Australian Championships	Melbourne, Victoria	1st	200 m	21.3 (−3.1)
1969/70	Australian Championships	Adelaide, South Australia	1st	200 m	21.0 (−2.1)
1971/72	Australian Championships	Perth, Western Australia	3rd	200 m	21.6

== Honours ==
Later in life and posthumously, Norman received a number of honours from Australian sport bodies, including:

- 1999 – Sport Australia Hall of Fame inductee
- 2000 – Australian Sports Medal
- 2010 – Athletics Australia Hall of Fame inductee
- 2018 – Order of Merit from Australian Olympic Committee
- 2022 – The Dawn Award
