= Holmwood Technical High School =

Coordinates: 18.1567°N 77.4877°W

Information
- Type: Technical High School
- Motto: Deeds Not Words
- Established: March 2, 1936
- Principal: Hidran McKulsky

Holywood Technical High School is a co-educational school in Christiana, Manchester, Jamaica. It was initially established as the first Practical Training Centre on March 2, 1936, and was later converted into a technical high school (Jamaican nomenclature for secondary education) by the government of Jamaica in 1961.

In 2023, Holmwood Tech was expanded on a J$184,000,000 (US$1214281) contract.

Holmwood Tech is known for its track and field teams, particularly its women's team performance at the Inter-Secondary Schools Boys and Girls Championships.

== Notable alumni ==
- Carl Lawson (sprinter) (born 1947), Jamaican sprinter
- Janieve Russell (born 1993), Jamaican hurdler
- Ashley Williams (sprinter) (born 1996), Jamaican sprinter
