= 1973 AAA Championships =

Outdoor track and field competition

- Dates: 13–14 July 1973
- Host city: London, England
- Venue: Crystal Palace National Sports Centre
- Level: Senior
- Type: Outdoor

The 1973 AAA Championships was the 1973 edition of the annual outdoor track and field competition organised by the Amateur Athletic Association (AAA). It was held from 13 to 14 July 1973 at Crystal Palace National Sports Centre in London, England.

== Summary ==
The Championships covered two days of competition. The marathon was held in Harlow.

The 10 miles event was discontinued.

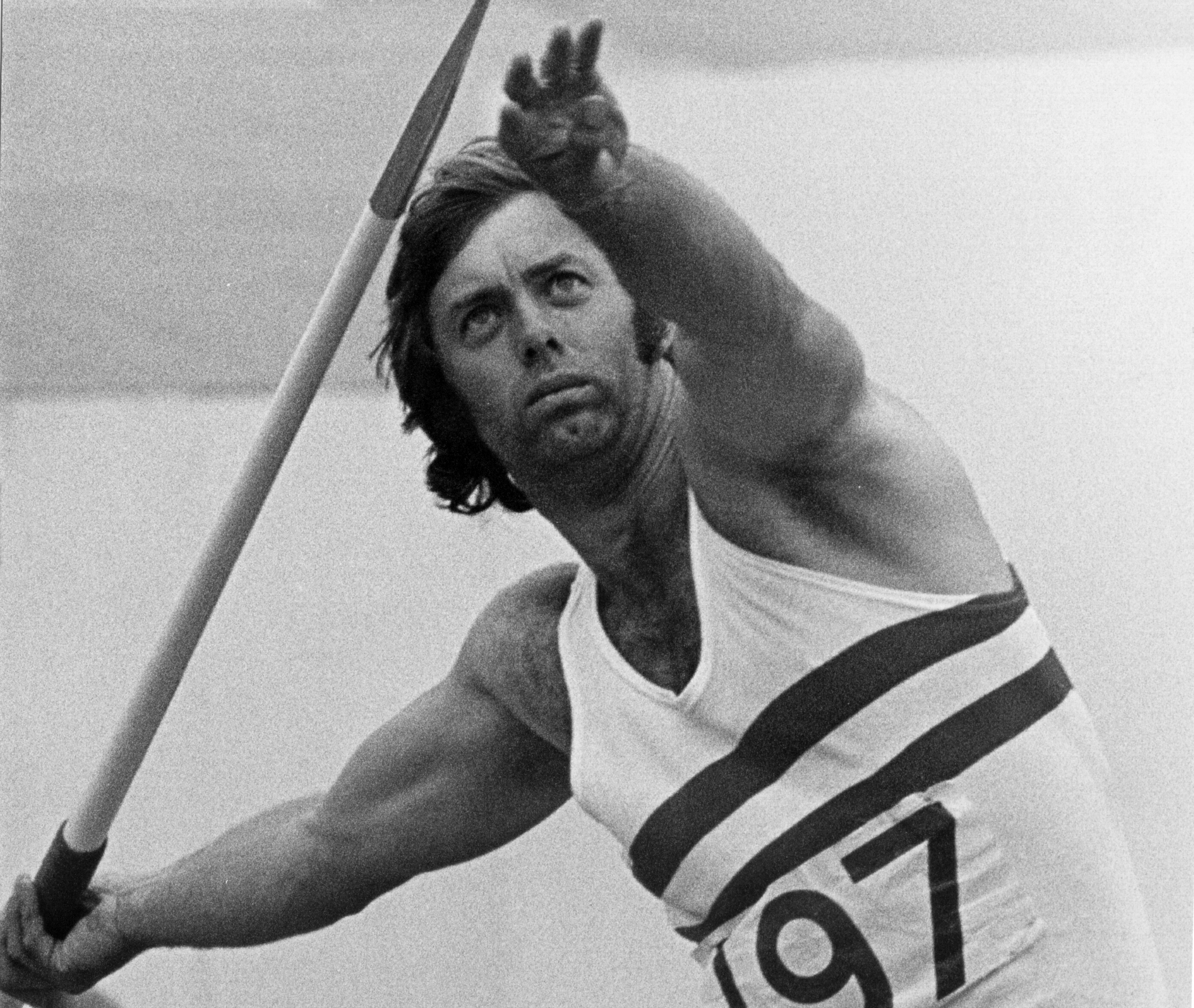
Dave Travis won his 6th of 7 AAA javelin titles

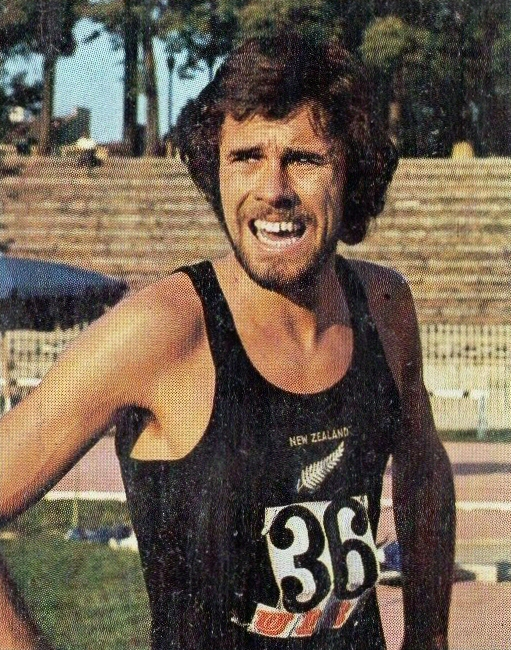
New Zealander Rod Dixon won the 1500 metres

== Results ==
Event	Gold		Silver		Bronze	
100m	(Scotland) Don Halliday	10.60	Brian Green	10.63	(Scotland) Les Piggot	10.69
200m	Chris Monk	21.12	(Australia) David Stokes	21.24	Ian Matthews	21.31
400m	(Scotland) David Jenkins	46.42	(South Africa) Joseph Leserwane	46.64	(Sweden) Erik Carlgren	46.85
800m	Andy Carter	1:45.12 NR	(South Africa) Danie Malan	1:45.21	(Australia) Bill Hooker	1:45.36
1,500m	(New Zealand) Rod Dixon	3:38.99	(Scotland) Frank Clement	3:39.41	Phil Banning	3:40.35
5,000m	Brendan Foster	13:23.71	(Scotland) Ian Stewart	13:30.84	Dave Black	13:33.24
10,000m	Dave Bedford	27:30.80 WR	(Wales) Tony Simmons	28:19.19	Bernie Plain	28:30.22
marathon	Ian Thompson	2:12:40	Ron Hill	2:13:22	Colin Kirkham	2:15:25
3000m steeplechase	Steve Hollings	8:30.81	John Bicourt	8:32.29	Gerry Stevens	8:35.26
110m hurdles	(Wales) Berwyn Price	14.10	Graham Gower	14.43	(Sweden) Bo Forssander	14.45
400m hurdles	Alan Pascoe	49.77	(United States) Bob Steele	50.43	Bill Hartley	50.45
3,000m walk	Roger Mills	12:16.8	Paul Nihill	12:18.6	Peter Marlow	12:28.8
10,000m walk	Roger Mills	44:38.6	Olly Flynn	44:52.4	Shaun Lightman	44:53.2
high jump	(United States) Chris Dunn	2.06	(Australia) Tony Sneazwell	2.06	(Republic of Ireland) James Fanning	2.06
pole vault	Brian Hooper	5.16	Mike Bull	5.00	(Sweden) Ingemar Jernberg	4.80
long jump	Geoff Hignett	7.37	Jerry Gangadeen	7.34	(Scotland) Stewart Atkins	7.31
triple jump	Tony Wadhams	15.76	Peter Blackburn	15.47	Andy Vincent	15.24
shot put	Geoff Capes	20.27 NR	Mike Winch	19.54	Bill Tancred	18.14
discus throw	Bill Tancred	61.22	John Hillier	58.10	Pete Tancred	54.22
hammer throw	Howard Payne	67.98	Barry Williams	67.02	Ian Chipchase	66.96
javelin throw	Dave Travis	73.58	Kevin Shappard	70.24	Brian Roberts	68.98
decathlon	(Scotland) David Kidner	6969	Nick Phipps	6654	Mike Corden	6595

== See also ==
- 1973 WAAA Championships
