= Jacob Harris (cricketer) =

Pakistani cricketer

Personal information
- Born: Karachi, Bombay Presidency, British India (now Pakistan)
- Batting: Right-handed
- Bowling: Right-arm Leg spin

Domestic team information
- Years: Team
- 1932/33–1935/36: Sind
- 1936/37–1937/38: Maharashtra
- 1938/1939: Sind
- 1939/40: Maharashtra

Career statistics
Competition	FC
Matches	25
Runs scored	881
Batting average	22.58
100s/50s	1/1
Top score	100
Balls bowled	1,706
Wickets	63
Bowling average	27.07
5 wickets in innings	1
10 wickets in match	0
Best bowling	5/67
Catches/stumpings	7/–
- Source: ESPNcricinfo, 28 October 2023

Jacob Harris was a first-class cricketer and sports coach from Karachi, Pakistan.

He was born in Karachi, when it was still part of British India. He studied at St Patrick's High School, Karachi. He played cricket as a right-hand batsman and a leg-break bowler. He played for the Sindh main first-class team from 1932/33 to 1938/39 and the Maharashtra main first-class team from 1936/37 and 1939/40. Between 1932 and 1943 he played 25 first-class matches. Between 1953 and 1957 he umpired six first-class matches as well.

He coached Wallis Mathias, Antao D'Souza, Khalid Wazir, Wasim Bari, Rashid Israr, all who became Test cricketers for Pakistan.

The undisputed fastest human in Pakistan John Permal attributed his success on the track to the support of his school coach Jacob Harris.

The Jacob Harris Shield Inter School Cricket Tournament was started in his honour in Karachi in 2009. Forty schools participated in the tournament.
