= Calvin Symonds =

Bermudian cricketer and footballer (born 1932)

Personal information
- Full name: Roderick Calvin Hilgrove Symonds
- Born: 29 March 1932 (age 94); Pembroke Parish, Bermuda
- Nickname: Bummy
- Batting: Right-handed
- Bowling: Right-arm medium pace
- Role: All-rounder

International information
- National side: Bermuda (1952–1965)
- Source: CricketArchive, 20 February 2017
Association football career
- Position: Centre forward
Senior career*
Years	Team	Apps	(Gls)
- PHC Zebras
1954–1955	Rochdale	1	(0)
- Key West Rangers
- * Club domestic league appearances and goals

Roderick Calvin Hilgrove Symonds, known as Calvin "Bummy" Symonds (born 29 March 1932), is a retired Bermudian cricketer and footballer. He represented the Bermuda national cricket team and played one match in the English Football League for Rochdale.

His nephew was NFL player and sprinter Rocky Thompson.

== Cricket career ==
Symonds was born in Pembroke Parish, Bermuda. He was a right-handed batsman and bowled right-arm medium pace concentrating on 'line and length'. "I bowled outside the off stick and tried to move the ball into you and hit your off stump or get you lbw.". He played for St George's Cricket Club and made his debut in the Annual Cup Match played between St George's CC and Somerset CC in 1950. Cup Match is the highlight of the cricket season in Bermuda, an island-wide celebration timed to coincide with the abolition of slavery and Mary Prince Day. Batting at No.4 he made just two runs before getting out, "nerves got the better of me that day." He didn't get the chance to redeem himself in the 2nd innings as he damaged his hand attempting a catch during Somerset's innings. After this inauspicious start he went on to become the most successful captain in Cup Match history, leading St George's to a run of nine matches unbeaten between 1961 and 1969, winning eight times and drawing once (in 1963). Symonds individual record in Cup Match was: 624 runs at an average of 24.00; 30 wickets taken at an average of 14.27; and 24 catches held. He also played for Western Stars, Pond Hill Stars and Pembroke Hamilton Club, and as an overseas professional in England for Rochdale CC of the Central Lancashire League.

He represented the Bermuda national team in unofficial matches between 1952 and 1965. Symonds played for Bermuda in December 1953 against the touring Marylebone Cricket Club (MCC) team, en route to their Test series in the West Indies. In the 1st innings he took the wickets of Denis Compton, Jim Laker, Tony Lock and Fred Trueman, and in the 2nd innings clean-bowled Tom Graveney. When Bermuda batted he played his part in a dogged 2nd innings partnership, scoring 11 not out, that secured a draw for the home team. (Note: This was the full England cricket team; by convention, they were billed as MCC for non-Test fixtures.) He also played against the touring Pakistanis and New Zealanders, but never appeared in any first-class or List A matches.

He went on tours with Bermuda to: Canada and the US as a callow seventeen year-old ("the grass was higher than I was, that was disastrous"); Jamaica (in 1958); and to England in 1960 and 1962 with the Bermuda Wanderers. The club teams they played in England had under-estimated the strength of the opposition and the Wanderers won all but one of their eight fixtures, often with ease." When they returned in 1962, they played against County 2nd XIs and, although they lost against Middlesex, they drew with a Surrey team that included a young Geoff Arnold who would go on to play 35 times for England. In 1965 an International XI, captained by Fred Titmus visited Bermuda and, in the International XI's 2nd innings Symonds added the name of Garfield Sobers to the list of illustrious batsmen whose wickets he took during his career. In 1968 Symonds was awarded the MBE for distinguished service to sport in Bermuda. He retired in 1969 but returned to coach the Bermuda team during the 1990s, passing on his experience to a younger generation. In 2020 Symonds was honoured when the Minister for Community Affairs and Sport unveiled a plaque in his honour at his former school, Northlands Primary.

== Football career ==
Symonds played football as a centre forward, initially for PHC Zebras. He was spotted by a scout visiting Bermuda from England and recommended for a trial, initially with Bolton Wanderers. Two weeks before he was due to leave the island that trial fell through and a trial was arranged with Rochdale AFC instead. He was met off the plane at London's Heathrow airport by Rochdale manager, Harry Catterick and he signed a contract with the club in October 1954. He scored twice on his debut for the reserves. He came up against some strong teams in the reserves and recalls playing against a Manchester United side that included a young Bobby Charlton and Tommy Taylor. He remembers being well received by the local community and, on 15 September 1955, he made his 1st team debut in an away game against Barrow AFC, thus becoming the first Black player to represent the club. His career in England was hampered by a recurring knee injury that two operations failed to resolve and he ended his contract with the club by mutual agreement, returning to Bermuda in November 1955. Following his return he was able to resume playing competitive football in Bermuda and played for Key West Rangers. He fondly recalls scoring five goals in a Bermuda League game in 1961. He retired from the game in 1962.
