= Olympic Project for Human Rights =

Former civil rights organization

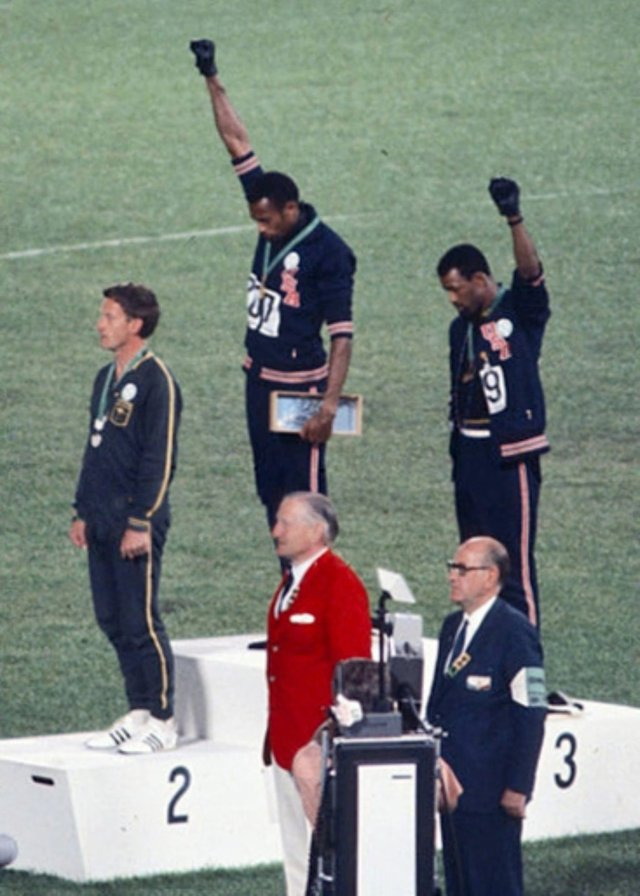
Image of the 1968 Olympics Black Power salute. Gold medalist Tommie Smith (center) and bronze medalist John Carlos (right) showing the raised fist on the podium after the 200 m race at the 1968 Summer Olympics; both wear Olympic Project for Human Rights badges. Peter Norman (silver medalist, left) from Australia also wears an OPHR badge in solidarity with Smith and Carlos.

The Olympic Project for Human Rights (OPHR) was an American organization established by sociologist Harry Edwards and multiple Black American athletes, including noted Olympic sprinters Tommie Smith and John Carlos, on October 7, 1967. The purpose of the group was to advocate for civil rights and human rights for Black people in the United States and Africans abroad (such as South Africa), along with protesting racism in sport in general. The OPHR proposed a complete Black athlete boycott of the 1968 Summer Olympics in Mexico City to achieve its goals. While the OPHR advocated for a boycott backed by all Black Americans, the group did not actively include women in its discussions and in the end was mostly composed of track and field athletes.

The proposed boycott from the OPHR failed to materialize. Instead, multiple athletes affiliated with the OPHR performed individual protests at the 1968 Summer Olympics in October. These protests included Smith's and Carlos' Black Power salute at the Games. In his autobiography, Smith expresses his concern that the OPHR and his salute have become viewed as being strictly about Black Power and reasserts that they were about human rights, stating they were for, "all humanity, even those who denied us ours." The OPHR and Smith's and Carlos' salutes are part of a long history of athletes advocating for racial equality. In 2020, Edwards described Colin Kaepernick's protests before National Football League (NFL) games in 2016 and the boycotts of multiple professional sporting leagues that occurred following the shooting of Jacob Blake in August 2020 as being natural continuations of the OPHR.

== Background to the OPHR ==
In the middle of the 20th century, many sports commentators and media outlets cited Black American athletes' success in sports as a sign of racial progress, implying that institutional racism was less of an issue in the United States than it was at the time. In an interview with Vox, Dexter Blackman, a professor of history at Morgan State University, states: "The media began to promote the black athlete as a symbol that racial democracy existed in the United States ... a factor that was used to dismiss the question of institutionalized racism." Amidst the growing Black Power and student movements in the 1960s, Black American athletes increasingly showed a heightened racial awareness. Some athletes began to speak against the idea of sport being an equalizer between races and discussed racial injustices they experienced on and off the field. Bill Russell was one prominent Black athlete that stressed the need for further progress in achieving equality in American sport and society at the time. He spoke, for example, about his experiences facing racial prejudices in his 1965 memoir Going Up for Glory.

Calls for Black Americans to boycott the Olympic Games over race relations in the United States emerged alongside these mid-20th century conversations about the role of athletics. The idea for a Black athlete boycott of the Olympics originated with comedian and civil rights activist Dick Gregory, who promoted boycotts of the 1960 and 1964 Summer Olympics. The idea to boycott the 1968 Mexico City Olympics originated from two different sources. First was Tommie Smith, who suggested the possibility that Black American athletes would boycott during an interview at the 1967 University Games in Tokyo. Second was Harry Edwards, who organized a successful boycott of San Jose State College's (now San Jose State University) first football game in the Fall 1967 season, drawing attention to the college's discriminatory policies in housing, admissions, and fraternity life. This boycott's success showed Edwards sporting protests' potential to accomplish positive changes in the lives of Black Americans.

Carrying on the momentum from his San Jose State boycott, Edwards hosted a meeting at his home on October 7, 1967, to organize a larger demonstration. At this meeting, attendees, including Smith and his San Jose State teammate Lee Evans, created the OPHR and planned a workshop to discuss the potential for a Black American boycott of the upcoming Summer Olympics. This workshop took place at the Lost Angeles Black Youth Conference on November 23, 1967, where there was an audience of 200. Those in attendance included several notable Black athletes, like Smith, Evans, John Carlos, Otis Burrell, and Lew Alcindor (Kareem Abdul-Jabbar). Alcindor summarized the challenges Black athletes faced when he spoke at the conference: "I found out last summer we don't catch hell because we aren't basketball stars or because we don't have money. We catch hell because we are black." Following the meeting, Edwards announced that the athletes at the event unanimously voted to support a boycott of the 1968 Summer Olympics.

== Proposed boycott of the 1968 Summer Olympics ==
The OPHR sought to bring the public's attention to the need for human rights for Black Americans and the racism that existed in American sports with this proposed boycott of the 1968 Summer Olympic Games in Mexico City. The group maintained that the boycott would occur unless its six conditions were met:

- The barring of South Africa and Rhodesia from Olympic competition (both countries were under white minority rule at the time). Despite this condition, athletes from Rhodesia at the time were in fact banned from competing in the 1968 Olympics, and also the two succeeding Olympics in 1972 and 1976, due to the nation being an unrecognized country.
- The restoration of Muhammad Ali's heavyweight boxing title and right to box
- The removal of Avery Brundage as president of the International Olympic Committee (IOC), who OPHR members thought was racist and antisemitic
- The hiring of more Black coaches to the United States Olympic team, as there was only one Black coach at the time
- The inclusion of Black individuals in the United States Olympic Committee (USOC); there was no Black member on the committee as of 1967
- The boycotting of New York Athletic Club (NYAC) events over the club's racist and antisemitic policies.

Harry Edwards announced these six demands on December 13, 1967, at the Americana Hotel, where he was joined by Floyd McKissick, then director of the Congress of Racial Equality, and Martin Luther King Jr.

Reactions to the proposed boycott varied amongst the media and Black Americans. Sports reporters generally dismissed the boycott, as they viewed sport as an avenue that provided many Black Americans opportunities, such as a college education, they otherwise would not have had access to. Differences in opinions on whether competing or boycotting most benefitted them existed between Black Americans. Some Black athletes believed in the idea many media outlets promoted, that sport served as an equalizer between races. American sprinter Jim Hines said the following in a 1968 interview: "I couldn't say I have been used...I was running for my benefit." Others that supported the boycott, such as Tommie Smith, John Carlos, and Lee Evans, were more critical of sport's ability to improve conditions of Black people in the United States. Individuals like them believed sports exploited Black athletes and did not provide them with benefits equal to those received by their white counterparts. Evans explained his pessimistic view of sport in a 1968 magazine: "If I go to the Olympics and win a gold medal...I still would have to come home to the poverty and degradation and that just isn't fair."

== OPHR before the 1968 Summer Olympics ==
=== New York Athletic Club (NYAC) Boycott ===
Members of the OPHR acted upon one of the organization's six demands on February 16, 1968, when the group organized a Black athlete boycott of the NYAC's annual indoor track meet at Madison Square Garden. At the time, the NYAC excluded Black and Jewish individuals from normal membership at the club but allowed them to compete in its events, as their athletic performances drew large crowds and higher ticket sales for the organization. The efforts of the OPHR were supported by groups like the American Jewish Congress and individuals like H. Rap Brown, of the Student Nonviolent Coordinating Committee. Sources at the time considered the boycott a success, which gave credibility to the possibility that a similar protest would work at the 1968 Summer Olympics. Media cited that times at the event were poor, with only 9 Black athletes amongst the 400 athletes that competed. Several teams of white athletes, including those from universities, like Villanova, Manhattan, and Georgetown, and a seven-man Russian squad, also pulled out to support this boycott against racism and antisemitism. The withdrawal of the Russian athletes was in line with other ways members of the Soviet Union weaponized sport and the subpar race relations of the United States to argue against democracy during the Cold War.

=== South Africa ===
At the same time the OHPR boycotted the NYAC, on February 15, 1968, the IOC announced its decision to readmit South Africa into Olympic competition, on the condition the country send an integrated team to Mexico City. This decision reversed the suspension the country received for its policy of apartheid in 1963 and conflicted with the six demands the OPHR had announced two months prior. A coalition of countries soon threatened to withdraw from the Games if South Africa was not once again banned. By March 1968, nearly all 32 nations of the Supreme Council for Sport in Africa committed to boycotting. Countries from Asia, the Middle East, and Caribbean similarly expressed their intention to boycott. Other nations, like Bulgaria, France, Czechoslovakia, Hungary, Japan, Belgium, and Soviet Union, called on the IOC to reverse its decision.

The OPHR also involved itself in the campaign to oust South Africa from the Olympics. Individuals associated with the OPHR, such as Lee Evans and John Carlos, were among the 65 athletes that signed a petition from the American Committee on Africa that supported the boycotting of the Olympics over South Africa's involvement. Harry Edwards also released a press release on behalf of the OPHR, which expressed the group's support for the nations withdrawing from competition. The statement read: "To all nations which have pulled out of the Mexico City Games...the Black Nation in this country endorses fully their decisions to pull out and that it is our firm intention to follow suit." This pressure led the IOC to reverse its decision, which Avery Brundage announced on April 24, 1968. South Africa would not compete in the 1968 Olympics games, or any Olympics which occurred between 1964 and 1988. Following South Africa's resuspension, members of the media began to speculate whether the OPHR's proposed boycott would still occur, as the IOC had just met one of the six conditions the group outlined in December 1967. At the time of South Africa's resuspension, most members of the OPHR remained committed to the boycott unless their other five demands were met, but a final decision still had not yet been reached.

=== Decision on boycott ===
The final decision on whether Black American athletes would go through with the OPHR's boycott occurred at the semi-final United States Olympic track and field trials in Los Angeles on June 29–30, 1968. At a prior meeting between OPHR members, they decided that a vote would take place at Los Angeles and if two-thirds of the Black athletes voted in favor of a boycott, the group would move forward with it. Of the 26 Black track and field athletes expected to qualify for the Olympics, 13 opposed, 12 favored, and 1 was undecided on the boycott. Since a two-thirds majority was not reached, discussions of boycotting halted. Conversations instead transitioned to what athletes from the OPHR would perform individual protests at the Mexico City Games and what these displays would look like.

The reasons for abandoning the boycott were numerous. Harry Edwards explains in his reflection on the OPHR, The Revolt of the Black Athlete, that some felt boycotting was "self-defeating" and had requested the OPHR consider other approaches to promoting the group's human rights message months before the Los Angeles trials. Without a total boycott from Black American track and field athletes, OPHR members also feared the USOC would simply replace individuals still intending to boycott, such as Tommie Smith, John Carlos, and Lee Evans, with other athletes. The final United States Olympic track and field trials in Lake Tahoe had yet to occur, as they took place on September 6–16, 1968, which would have given the USOC enough time to substitute potential boycotters with those that had qualifying times from the earlier Los Angeles trials. Those in the OPHR believed if these substitutions happened it would leave the sacrifices of those that actually boycotted worthless. Thus, the remnants of the OPHR began to emphasize the need for individual protests rather than a total boycott.

== Black Power salute ==
While the boycott failed to materialize, two members of the OPHR, Tommie Smith and John Carlos, became part of what some consider one of the most iconic, controversial, and important moments in sport history. On October 16, 1968, Smith won gold in the 200-meter dash, while Carlos earned third place and the bronze medal. At the awards ceremony for the race, the pair performed their protest. The pair wore OPHR buttons, black socks on their shoeless feet, and a black glove on a single hand while they received their medals on the podium. The pair then made raised fists with their black-gloved hands and lowered their heads during the playing of "The Star-Spangled Banner".

In an interview with Howard Cosell for the American Broadcasting Company, Smith interpreted the different visual elements of the protest, stating:

My raised right hand stood for power in black America. Carlos's left hand stood for unity of black America. Together, they formed an arch of unity and power...The black socks with no shoes stood for black poverty in racist America. The totality of our effort was regaining of black dignity.

Smith and Carlos also both incorporated elements unique into their own salutes. Smith wore a black scarf to represent Black pride. Carlos wore beads around his neck, which he later claimed were for the Black individuals lynched in the United States throughout the country's history. Carlos also unzipped his track jacket, which violated Olympic tradition, to represent blue-collar workers in America. Smith and Carlos were also accompanied by Peter Norman, the white Australian sprinter that placed second in the 200-meter finals. Norman wore an OPHR button in solidarity with the two Black Americans while they protested.

The USOC first responded to Smith's and Carlos' protest on October 17, 1968. The USOC issued an apology to the IOC for the sprinters' actions and warned other American athletes to not consider doing their own displays, but the committee did not initially take any formal action against Smith and Carlos. After receiving pressure from the IOC, however, the USOC suspended Smith and Carlos, confiscating their Olympic credentials and demanding they leave the Olympic Village and Mexico City within 48 hours. The American media also reacted to the Black sprinters' salute from October 16. According to historian Martin A. Berger, much of white individuals' responses were unsympathetic, even hostile. Sportswriter Brent Musburger, for example, described Smith and Carlos as, "a couple of black-skinned storm troopers." Complaints largely centered on how Smith and Carlos politicized the unpolitical Olympics, that their protest would negatively impact race relations in the United States, and that they were disrespectful to their country. Upon returning to the United States, Smith and Carlos experienced backlash for their actions for many years. The two received hate mail and death threats, struggled economically as employers refused to hire them, and experienced troubled marriages, due, in part, to the pressure caused by these other forms of backlash they encountered.

== Other OPHR supporters at the 1968 Summer Olympics ==
=== Lee Evans and other Black American men ===
Despite the USOC's warning and the committee sending former Olympian Jesse Owens to advise a group of Black Americans to not protest, some remained upset over Smith's and Carlos' suspensions and performed minor displays at the Olympics. Lee Evans, an active member of the OPHR and Smith's college teammate, won the 400-meter dash on October 18, 1968. Evans' fellow Black American teammates Larry James and Ron Freeman placed second and third in the race. During the medal ceremony, Evans, James, and Freeman took the podium wearing black berets in the style of the Black Panther Party, while Evans wore an OPHR button. The three made Black Power salutes after receiving their medals, but removed their berets and faced the American flag during the playing of "The Star-Spangled Banner." While Evans, James, and Freeman made raised fist gestures like Smith and Carlos had, the trio did not receive the same negative responses from the media or the USOC. A representative of the USOC remarked that: "Lee Evans accepted his medal in fine style." Sources speculate that Evans and company avoided similar treatment as Smith and Carlos, as he, James, and Freeman avoided demonstrating during the national anthem unlike the 200-meter sprinters. Harry Edwards later expressed his own disappointment with the extent of Evans' protest.

Black American long jumper Bob Beamon earned the gold medal in his event and accepted the award while wearing black socks with rolled up pantlegs, just like how Smith and Carlos had worn their pants when they protested. Ralph Boston, a Black American who initially opposed the OPHR but later warmed to its proposed boycott, received third place in the long jump event. Boston did not wear shoes or socks while on the awards podium and later suggested the USOC send him home for his protest, just as the committee had done to Smith and Carlos. As with Evans and his fellow 400-meter sprinters, however, Beamon and Boston did not push their demonstrations far enough to elicit the same critical responses Smith and Carlos had received a few days prior.

=== White supporters ===
Members of the Harvard University men's rowing team were among the OPHR's few white supporters. In July 1967, six of the nine-member team issued a statement before the press: an "Act of Conscience in support of the Olympic Project for Human Rights." The statement concluded by stating:

Surely the spirit of the Olympic Games requires us, as white participants, to explore all the means at our disposal to further the cause of brotherhood and the claims to equality to our black colleagues.

Prior to making their statement, two members of the crew, Cleve Livingston and Paul Hoffman, had met with Harry Edwards, who was also present when the team announced its support of the OPHR. Leading up to the 1968 Summer Olympics, members of the Harvard rowing team wrote letters to other white American athletes to encourage them to think of the issues Black Americans faced and how these concerns necessitated the OPHR and its goal of broadcasting these problems to the world. Due to their support of the OPHR, members of the Harvard crew were consistently harassed by individuals from the USOC. The USOC president, for instance, threatened to send the team home from their Olympic training in Colorado over the letters members had been sending to other athletes. Later, in Mexico City, on October 17, 1968, the USOC called-in and investigated Hoffman, who sat with Tommie Smith's and John Carlos' wives during the sprinters' protest, for his involvement in the pair's Black Power salute. The investigation jeopardized the Harvard team, who had yet to compete in their event at the Olympics.

Peter Norman, another of the OPHR's few white allies, was the Australian sprinter that stood alongside Smith and Carlos during their salutes. Prior to the awards ceremony, Norman asked Smith and Carlos if there was any way he could support the two's protest, before eventually borrowing an OPHR button from Paul Hoffman. Norman's support for Smith's, Carlos', and the OPHR's human rights and race relations concerns stemmed from his own opposition to his country's discriminatory White Australia policy. In an interview, Carlos said Norman's parents' involvement in the Salvation Army also gave the Australian an appreciation for human rights. After standing in solidarity with the two Americans, the Australian Olympic Committee (AOC), according to some sources, ostracized Norman. Despite recording qualifying times, the AOC did not select Norman to participate in the 1972 Summer Olympics in Munich and the committee also did not invite him to be a representative for the 2000 Summer Olympics in Sydney. The Parliament of Australia later issued an apology to Norman in 2012, six years after his death, for the country's treatment of him and its failure to recognize the significance of his role in supporting Smith and Carlos, while the AOC also presented him an Order of Merit posthumously in 2018.

=== Black American women ===
The OPHR did not attempt to recruit prominent Black American women athletes into the organization. Sprinter Wyomia Tyus noted this exclusion, as she criticized the men of the OPHR for believing Black women supported the group's objective without seeking their involvement. According to historian Amy Bass, the omittance of women in the group's ranks was not a unique issue to the OPHR but was a common practice observable in other social justice movements throughout the 1960s as well.

Despite the upper ranks of the OPHR ignoring them, some Black American women showed their support for the group. When traveling to the Mexico City Olympics, members of the Tennessee State Tigerbelles, like Tyus, Martha Watson, and Ellie Montgomery, wore OPHR buttons. At the 1968 Summer Olympics, Tyus communicated with other Americans in the Olympic Village to discuss protesting in support of the OPHR's fight against racial injustice. Tyus, herself, protested by wearing a pair of black shorts when she ran in the 100-meter dash and 4 × 100 meter-relay. Tyus and the other Americans of the gold-winning 4 x 100 meter-relay team (Barbara Ferrell, Margaret Bailes, and Mildrette Netter) also dedicated their medals to Tommie Smith and John Carlos following the pair's salutes and subsequent suspensions.

=== International support ===
Along with sparking conversations amongst Americans, Smith's and Carlos' protest directed international attention to the racism found in American sport and onto the role of politics within the Olympics, as well. While some international athletes criticized the sprinters' actions, there were others alongside Norman that lent their support to the OPHR's mission in fighting for Black individuals' human rights globally. For their part, the Cuban women's 4 x 100 meter-relay team presented their silver medal in the event to OPHR founder Harry Edwards. While Martin Jellinghaus, the anchor to the German men's 4 x 400 meter-relay team, wore an OPHR button when him and his teammates received their bronze medals for the event.

== Recent sporting protests ==
In a 2020 interview, Harry Edwards compared the OPHR and Tommie Smith's and John Carlos' salutes to Colin Kaepernick's protests. In the fall of 2016, Kaepernick began to sit, and later kneel, during the playing of "The Star-Spangled Banner" before the start of games in the NFL, protesting racial injustice and police brutality against Black people in the United States. Like Carlos and Smith, Kaepernick specifically protested during the playing of the national anthem and experienced backlash for his actions from the media, politicians, veteran supporters, and other sources. Kaepernick's actions inspired other athletes from different sports, professional and amateur, to perform similar demonstrations as well. The police murder of George Floyd and killing of Breonna Taylor in 2020 also contributed to new waves of activism from athletes on the issue of human rights. Following the police shooting of Jacob Blake on August 23, 2020, in Kenosha, Wisconsin, the Milwaukee Bucks refused to take the court for their National Basketball Association (NBA) playoff game on August 26 in protest. The other NBA teams joined the Buck's boycott, leading to the NBA postponing the remaining games for that day. Other professional sporting organizations such as Major League Baseball, Major League Soccer, and Women's National Basketball Association—a long-time leader in advocating for social justice—joined the NBA in postponing games.

At the 2020 Summer Olympics in Tokyo, a tradition of protesting at the Olympics, which Smith and Carlos partook in, continued. American track and field athlete Raven Saunders placed second in the shot put event at the 2020 Tokyo Olympics, while on the medal podium she crossed her arms in the shape of an "X." Saunders later stated her gesture was for oppressed people throughout the world. Race Imboden, American fencer, received his bronze medal for the team foil competition at the 2020 Olympics with a symbol drawn on his right hand. Imboden had earlier received a 12-month probation from the United States Olympic & Paralympic Committee for his protest at the 2019 Pan American Games, where he took a knee during the playing of "The Star-Spangled Banner" to protest against racism and gun violence within the United States.
