= John Harrison (sprinter) =

British sprinter (born 1949)

Personal information
- Nationality: British (English)
- Born: c.1949 England

Sport
- Sport: Athletics
- Event: Sprinting
- Club: Warrington AC

John Harrison (born c.1949) is a former international sprinter who competed at the Commonwealth Games.

== Biography ==
Harrison was a member of the Warrington Athletic Club and specialised in the sprint distances from 80 metres to 400 metres. Aged 15, he ran 49.5 seconds for 440 yards, which was a European age record and in 1966 he set a UK U17 record of 21.7 seconds for the 200 metres. He represented Great Britain as a junior and in 1969 set a club record of 21.5 seconds, which lasted for 44 years.

Harrison represented the England team at the 1970 British Commonwealth Games in Edinburgh, Scotland, where he competed in the 100 metres event.

In 1973, he was a teacher by profression and lived at Laburnum Avenue in Runcorn.
