= Yeo Kian Chye =

Singaporean sprinter

Yeo Kian Chai
Personal information
- Nationality: Singaporean
- Born: 2 November 1943 (age 82)

Sport
- Sport: Sprinting
- Event: 100 metres

Yeo Kian Chai (born 2 November 1943) is a Singaporean sprinter. He competed in the men's 100 metres and the 200 metres at the 1972 Summer Olympics.

Yeo competed in the men's 4x100 m relay at the 1967 Southeast Asian Peninsular Games (SEAP Games) and won a silver medal. In the 1969 SEAP Games, he competed in the same event and won a bronze medal.

In 1970, Yeo competed in the men's 100 metres and the 200 meters at the British Commonwealth Games. At the 1971 SEAP Games, Yeo won the silver medals for both the men's 100 m and men's 4x100 m relay. He won bronze medals for the men's 200 m and the men's 4x100 m relay.

In 1972, Yeo competed in the men's 100 and 200 metres at the 1972 Summer Olympics and did not qualify out of his heats. At the 1973 SEAP Games, Yeo won the silver medal for the men's 100 m. At the 1975 SEAP Games, Yeo continued to win the silver medal for the men's 100 m and also the silver medal in the men's 4x100 m relay.
