= Carl Archer =

Trinidad and Tobago sprinter

Carl Archer (born September 17, 1948 in Trinidad) is a retired athlete from Trinidad and Tobago who specialized in the 100 metres.

At the 1970 British Commonwealth Games he finished sixth in the 4 x 100 metres relay, together with teammates Hasely Crawford, John Mottley and Edwin Roberts. He reached the quarterfinals in both the 100 and 200 metres at the same games. He also competed at the 1968 Summer Olympics and the 1970 Central American and Caribbean Games

== International competitions ==
Year	Competition	Venue	Position	Event	Notes
Representing Trinidad and Tobago
1968	Olympic Games	Mexico City, Mexico	10th (sf)	4 × 100 m relay	39.5
1970	Central American and Caribbean Games	Panama City, Panama	5th	4 × 100 m relay	41.6
1970	Commonwealth Games	Edinburgh, United Kingdom	27th (qf)	100 m	10.69
1970	Commonwealth Games	Edinburgh, United Kingdom	29th (qf)	200 m	21.9
1970	Commonwealth Games	Edinburgh, United Kingdom	6th	4 × 100 m relay	40.3

== Personal bests ==
- 100 metres – 10.4H (Pointe-a-Pierre 1969)
- 200 metres – 21.0H (Pointe-a-Pierre 1969)
