= Don Quarrie =

Jamaican sprinter (born 1951)

The Honourable Don Quarrie CD
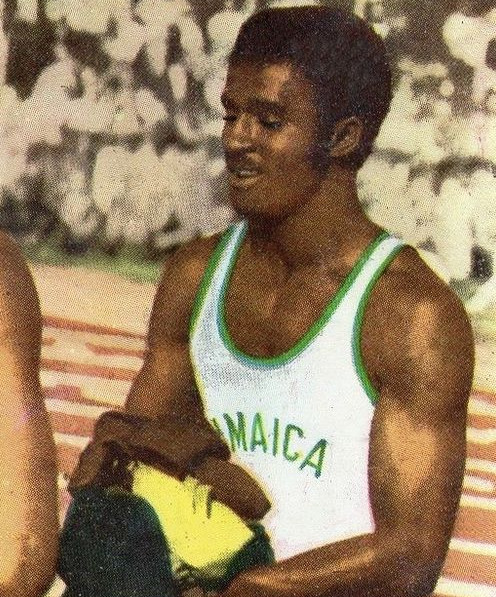

Personal information
- Full name: Donald O'Reilly Quarrie
- Born: 25 February 1951 (age 75) Kingston, Jamaica
- Height: 175 cm (5 ft 9 in)
- Weight: 70 kg (154 lb)

Sport
- Sport: Track and field
- Events: 100 m, 200 m

Achievements and titles
- Personal bests: 100 m – 9.99 (1976); 200 m – 19.86 (1971)
Medal record
Men's athletics
Representing Jamaica
Olympic Games
| Gold medal – first place | 1976 Montreal | 200 metres |
| Silver medal – second place | 1976 Montreal | 100 metres |
| Bronze medal – third place | 1980 Moscow | 200 metres |
| Silver medal – second place | 1984 Los Angeles | 4 × 100 m relay |
Pan American Games
| Gold medal – first place | 1971 Cali | 100 metres |
| Gold medal – first place | 1971 Cali | 200 metres |
| Gold medal – first place | 1971 Cali | 4 × 100 metres |
Commonwealth Games
| Gold medal – first place | 1970 Edinburgh | 100 metres |
| Gold medal – first place | 1970 Edinburgh | 200 metres |
| Gold medal – first place | 1970 Edinburgh | 4 × 100 metres |
| Gold medal – first place | 1974 Christchurch | 100 metres |
| Gold medal – first place | 1974 Christchurch | 200 metres |
| Gold medal – first place | 1978 Edmonton | 100 metres |
Representing Americas
IAAF World Cup
| Bronze medal – third place | 1977 Düsseldorf | 4 × 100 metre relay |
- Updated on 28 December 2015

Donald O'Riley Quarrie CD (born 25 February 1951) is a Jamaican former track and field athlete, one of the world's top sprinters during the 1970s. At the 1976 Summer Olympics he was the gold medallist in the Olympic 200 meters and silver medallist in the Olympic 100 meters. In all, he competed in five Olympic Games and won four Olympic medals during his career.

He nearly equalled the 200 meters world record in 1971, coming within .03 seconds of the time set by Tommie Smith in 1968. He has a personal best of 19.86 seconds set in Cali, Colombia on 3 August 1971. As of 2024, this remains the track record.

He won 100 metres/200 metres sprint doubles at the 1970 Commonwealth Games, 1971 Pan American Games, and 1974 Commonwealth Games. He was the first male to defend either the 100 m or 200 m title at the Commonwealth Games and a 100 m win at the 1978 Commonwealth Games makes him the only person to have won that title three times. He won nine gold medals in the sprints at the Central American and Caribbean Championships in Athletics from 1971 to 1981.

He has received recognition both on and off the field. He was a five-time winner at the Jamaican Sportsperson of the Year and a statue of him is positioned at the entrance to Jamaica's National Stadium. There is also a school (Donald Quarrie High School) that bears his name in Eastern Kingston. Reggae artists have paid respect to his achievements with songs including "Tribute to Donald Quarrie", one by Joe Gibbs and The Guerrillas and one by Bongo Herman.

== Athletics career ==
Quarrie made the Jamaican 100 m team for the 1968 Summer Olympics as a 17-year-old, but he injured himself in training, and could not take part. He moved to the United States and attended the University of Nebraska–Lincoln and later the University of Southern California, where he graduated with a degree in Business and Public Administration. There, his sprinting capabilities gradually increased. At the 1970 Commonwealth Games, Quarrie won the gold medal in both the 100 and 200 m, surprising his more experienced competitors. Anchoring the Jamaican 4 × 100 m relay team, he pocketed a third Commonwealth title.

Quarrie repeated his sprint double the following year at the Pan American Games in Cali and his time in the 200 meters was a hand-timed 19.8. One of the favourites for the upcoming Munich Olympics, Quarrie again suffered from injuries at the Olympic Games. He did compete in the 200 m but had to abandon his 200 m semi-final after pulling a muscle.

In 1974 Quarrie repeated his 1970 performance by grabbing the 100 and 200 m titles at the Commonwealth Games in Christchurch, becoming the first athlete to retain the title in either event. The next season, he again tied the 200 m world record, 19.8. He also tied the 100 m record with a hand-timed mark (9.9) in 1976 at the California Relays at Modesto Junior College, one of only a few athletes to have held these records simultaneously. This time was actually 10.07 seconds.

In 1976 after winning both the 100 and 200 AAA Championships titles at the 1976 AAA Championships, Quarrie could finally compete at the Olympics without injuries. He first made the 100 m final, which he led until overtaken by Trinidadian Hasely Crawford. In the 200 m Quarrie led the pack coming out of the turn and held off all challenges to take the title in 20.22.

At the 1978 Commonwealth Games he won his third consecutive 100 m title but was eliminated in the 200 m after a cramp attack. Quarrie's participation in his fourth Olympics in Moscow was in doubt after he was involved in a car crash the previous year. He recovered in time to compete but was eliminated in the 100 m semi-finals. His title defense failed in the 200 m but he did make the final and finished third, adding a bronze medal to his collection.

Quarrie won two more British AAA Championships over 200 metres in 1978 and 1982.

By 1984 Quarrie was no longer among the world's best in the individual sprint events and it was therefore no surprise he was eliminated in the heats of the 200 m event at the Los Angeles Olympics. However, he won a fourth Olympic medal with the Jamaican 4 × 100 m relay team, which finished second behind the United States. His final competitive race was a 200 m in London in September 1984, in which he finished 3rd.

== International competitions ==
| Year | Competition | Venue | Position | Event | Notes |
Representing Jamaica
| 1970 | Commonwealth Games | Edinburgh, United Kingdom | 1st | 100 m | 10.24 |
| 1970 | Commonwealth Games | Edinburgh, United Kingdom | 1st | 200 m | 20.56 |
| 1970 | Commonwealth Games | Edinburgh, United Kingdom | 1st | 4 × 100 m relay | 39.46 |
| 1971 | Central American and Caribbean Championships | Kingston, Jamaica | 1st | 100 m | 10.2 |
| 1971 | Central American and Caribbean Championships | Kingston, Jamaica | 1st | 200 m | 20.6 |
| 1971 | Central American and Caribbean Championships | Kingston, Jamaica | 1st | 4 × 100 m relay | 39.2 |
| 1971 | Pan American Games | Cali, Colombia | 1st | 100 m | 10.29 |
| 1971 | Pan American Games | Cali, Colombia | 1st | 200 m | 19.86 |
| 1971 | Pan American Games | Cali, Colombia | 1st | 4 × 100 m relay | 39.28 |
| 1972 | Olympic Games | Munich, West Germany | 3rd (qf) | 200 m | 20.43^{1} |
| 1973 | Central American and Caribbean Championships | Maracaibo, Venezuela | 1st | 100 m | 10.2 |
| 1973 | Central American and Caribbean Championships | Maracaibo, Venezuela | 1st | 200 m | 20.1 |
| 1973 | Central American and Caribbean Championships | Maracaibo, Venezuela | 1st | 4 × 100 m relay | 39.9 |
| 1974 | Commonwealth Games | Christchurch, New Zealand | 1st | 100 m | 10.38 |
| 1974 | Commonwealth Games | Christchurch, New Zealand | 1st | 200 m | 20.73 |
| 1974 | Commonwealth Games | Christchurch, New Zealand | 4th | 4 × 100 m relay | 39.77 |
| 1975 | Central American and Caribbean Championships | Ponce, Puerto Rico | 1st | 200 m | 21.5 |
| 1975 | Central American and Caribbean Championships | Ponce, Puerto Rico | 1st | 4 × 100 m relay | 40.6 |
| 1976 | Olympic Games | Montreal, Canada | 2nd | 100 m | 10.08 |
| 1976 | Olympic Games | Montreal, Canada | 1st | 200 m | 20.23 |
| 1976 | Olympic Games | Montreal, Canada | 5th | 4 × 400 m relay | 3:02.84 |
| 1977 | World Cup | Düsseldorf, West Germany | 3rd | 4 × 100 m relay | 38.66^{2} |
| 1978 | Commonwealth Games | Edmonton, Canada | 1st | 100 m | 10.03 |
| 1978 | Commonwealth Games | Edmonton, Canada | 12th (sf) | 200 m | 21.49 |
| 1979 | Pan American Games | San Juan, Puerto Rico | 4th | 4 × 100 m relay | 39.83 |
| 1980 | Olympic Games | Moscow, Soviet Union | 13th (sf) | 100 m | 10.55 |
| 1980 | Olympic Games | Moscow, Soviet Union | 3rd | 200 m | 20.29 |
| 1980 | Olympic Games | Moscow, Soviet Union | 9th (h) | 4 × 100 m relay | 39.71 |
| 1981 | Central American and Caribbean Championships | Santo Domingo, Dominican Republic | 2nd | 200 m | 20.93 |
| 1981 | Central American and Caribbean Championships | Santo Domingo, Dominican Republic | 1st | 4 × 100 m relay | 39.30 |
| 1981 | World Cup | Rome, Italy | 4th | 200 m | 20.66^{2} |
| 1981 | World Cup | Rome, Italy | 5th | 4 × 100 m relay | 39.13^{2} |
| 1982 | Commonwealth Games | Brisbane, Australia | 12th (sf) | 100 m | 10.43 |
| 1982 | Commonwealth Games | Brisbane, Australia | 18th (sf) | 200 m | 22.04 |
| 1984 | Olympic Games | Los Angeles, United States | 11th (sf) | 200 m | 20.77 |
| 1984 | Olympic Games | Los Angeles, United States | 2nd | 4 × 100 m relay | 38.62 |

^{1}Did not finish in the semifinals
^{2}Representing the Americas

== See also ==
- Athletics in Jamaica
- Jamaica at the Olympics

Sporting positions
| Preceded by John Carlos; Steve Williams | Men's 200 m world leading performance 1971; 1974–1975 | Succeeded by Valeriy Borzov; Millard Hampton |
