= Lennox Miller =

Jamaican runner

Medal record

Men's athletics

Representing Jamaica

Olympic Games
Silver medal – second place	1968 Mexico City	100 m
Bronze medal – third place	1972 Munich	100 m

British Commonwealth Games
Gold medal – first place	1970 Edinburgh	4×100 m relay
Silver medal – second place	1970 Edinburgh	100 m

Pan American Games
Gold medal – first place	1971 Cali	4×100 m relay
Silver medal – second place	1971 Cali	100 m

Lennox Valencia Miller (8 October 1946 – 8 November 2004) was a Jamaican runner and father of Inger Miller.

== Career ==
Miller won the silver medal in the 100 meters in the 1968 Summer Olympics and the bronze in the 1972 Summer Olympics, also in the 100.

He and Inger are the first father-daughter to win Olympic track and field medals. He was her coach prior to her winning gold in the 1996 Summer Olympics. Both ran for the University of Southern California, where Miller earned a degree in psychology and graduated from the dental school. He had been a dentist in Pasadena for 30 years.

While at USC, Miller anchored the still standing World Record 4×110 yard relay at the NCAA Men's Outdoor Track and Field Championships, held at Brigham Young University in Provo, Utah. The Imperial distance became defunct as the IAAF now only recognizes metric races (except the one Mile run), so the event is rarely run and not part of elite competition. The record was also complicated because of Miller's Jamaican citizenship, the makeup of the team was not entirely from one country. Miller took the baton from O. J. Simpson. Also on the team was future NFL star Earl McCullouch.

== International competitions ==
Year	Competition	Venue	Position	Event	Notes
Representing Jamaica
1965	British West Indies Championships	Bridgetown, Barbados	1st	100 m	10.6
1966	Central American and Caribbean Games	San Juan, Puerto Rico	–	100 m	DNF
1966	British Empire and Commonwealth Games	Kingston, Jamaica	16th (sf)	100 y	10.7
1968	Olympic Games	Mexico City, Mexico	2nd	100 m	10.04
1968	Olympic Games	Mexico City, Mexico	4th	4 × 100 m relay	38.4
1970	British Commonwealth Games	Edinburgh, United Kingdom	2nd	100 m	10.32 (W)
1970	British Commonwealth Games	Edinburgh, United Kingdom	1st	4 × 100 m relay	39.46
1971	Central American and Caribbean Championships	Kingston, Jamaica	2nd	100 m	10.2
1971	Central American and Caribbean Championships	Kingston, Jamaica	1st	4 × 100 m relay	39.2
1971	Pan American Games	Cali, Colombia	2nd	100 m	10.32
1971	Pan American Games	Cali, Colombia	1st	4 × 100 m relay	39.28
1972	Olympic Games	Munich, West Germany	3rd	100 m	10.33
1974	British Commonwealth Games	Christchurch, New Zealand	9th (sf)	100 m	10.63
1974	British Commonwealth Games	Christchurch, New Zealand	4th	4 × 100 m relay	39.77
