= John Carlos =

American track and field athlete

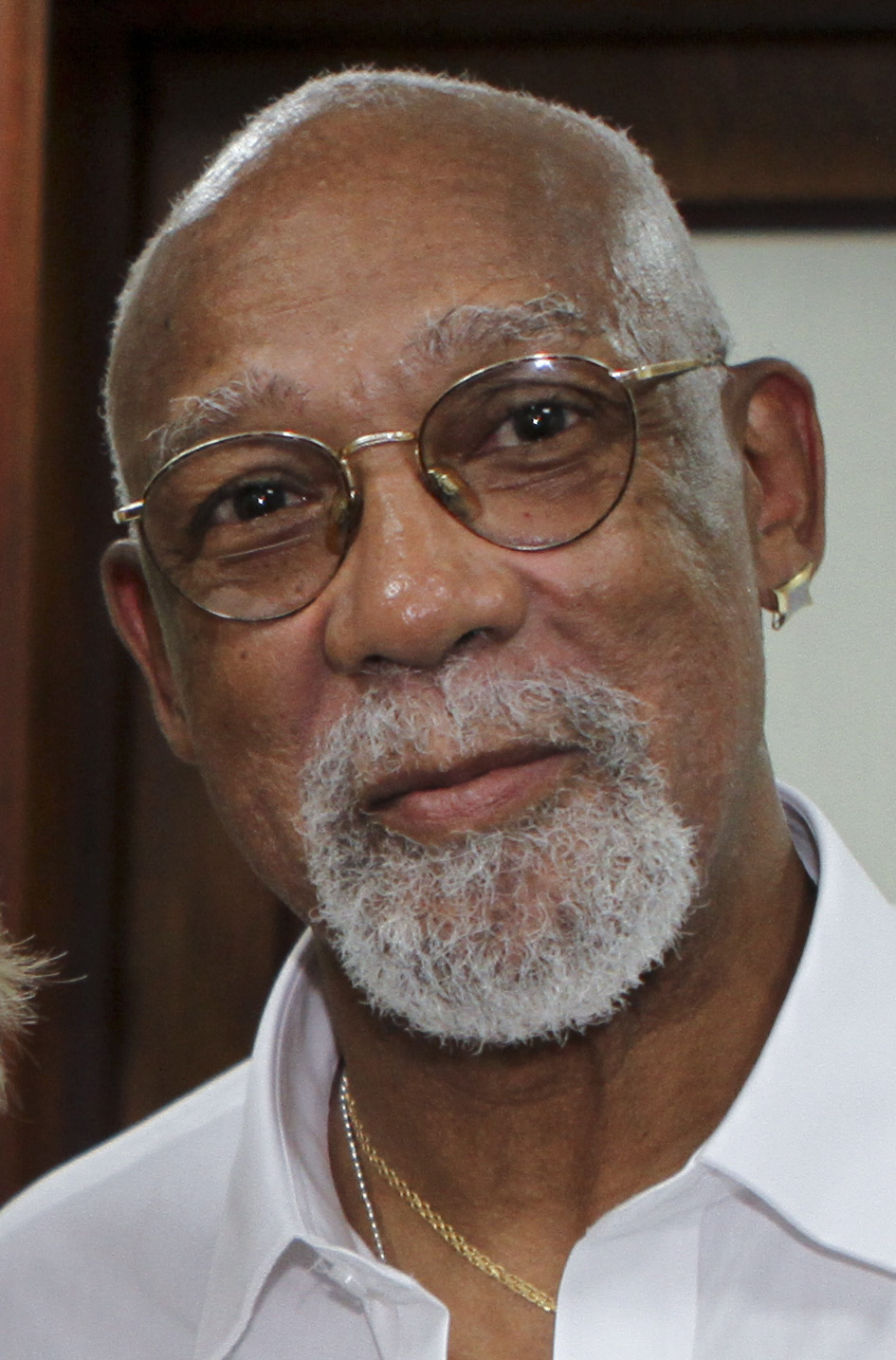
- Carlos in 2012

Personal information
- Full name: John Wesley Carlos
- Born: June 5, 1945 (age 81) New York City, U.S.
- Height: 6 ft 4 in (1.93 m)
- Weight: 187 lb (85 kg)

Sport
- Sport: Sprint running
- Club: Santa Clara Valley Youth Village

Achievements and titles
- Personal bests: 100 y – 9.1 (1969); 100 m – 10.0 (1968); 200 m – 19.92 (1968); 440 y – 47.0 (1967)
Medal record
Men's athletics
Representing the United States
Olympic Games
Bronze medal – third place	1968 Mexico City	200 m
Pan American Games
Gold medal – first place	1967 Winnipeg	200 m

John Wesley Carlos (born June 5, 1945) is an American former track and field athlete and professional football player. He was the bronze-medal winner in the 200 meters at the 1968 Summer Olympics, where he displayed the Black Power salute on the podium with Tommie Smith. He went on to tie the world record in the 100-yard dash and beat the 200 meters world record (although the latter achievement was never certified). After his track career, he enjoyed a brief stint in the Canadian Football League but retired due to injury.

He became involved with the United States Olympic Committee and helped to organize the 1984 Summer Olympics. Following this, he became a track coach at Palm Springs High School. He was inducted into the USA Track & Field Hall of Fame in 2003.

He is the author, with sportswriter Dave Zirin, of The John Carlos Story: The Sports Moment That Changed the World, published in 2011 by Haymarket Books.

The swedish band Nationalteatern made a song about him called "Mr John Carlos" on their album Livet är en fest, 1974.

== Early life and education ==
Born in The Bronx, Carlos was raised in the Harlem neighborhood of New York City. His mother, Vioris (née Lawrence, 1919–2016), was born in Jamaica to Black Cuban parents and grew up in Santiago, Cuba. His father, Earl V. Carlos Sr. (1895–1969), was from South Carolina. Carlos participated in a 200-meter dash and as a member of the 4×400-meter relay helped lead ETSU to the 1967 Lone Star Conference Championship. After his first year, Carlos enrolled at San Jose State University where he was trained by future National Track & Field Hall of Fame coach Lloyd (Bud) Winter.

Carlos was awarded an honorary doctorate from California State University in 2008. In 2012, he was awarded honorary doctorates from his alma maters Texas A&M University-Commerce (formerly East Texas State University) and San Jose State University.

== Olympics ==
The 1968 Olympic Trials were held on the Californian side of Lake Tahoe at Echo Summit trailhead, which at 7,377 feet above sea level is approximately the same altitude as Mexico City. Carlos won the 200-meter dash in 19.92 seconds, beating world-record holder Tommie Smith and surpassing his record by 0.3 seconds. Though the record was never ratified because the spike formation on Carlos's shoes ("brush spikes") was not accepted at the time, the race reinforced his status as a world-class sprinter.

Carlos became a founding member of the Olympic Project for Human Rights (OPHR), and originally advocated a boycott of the 1968 Mexico City Olympic Games unless four conditions were met: withdrawal of South Africa and Rhodesia from the games, restoration of Muhammad Ali's world heavyweight boxing title, Avery Brundage to step down as president of the IOC, and the hiring of more African-American assistant coaches. As the boycott failed to achieve support after the IOC withdrew invitations for South Africa and Rhodesia, he decided, together with Smith, to participate but to stage a protest in case he received a medal. Following his third-place finish behind fellow American Smith and Australian Peter Norman in the 200 meters at the Mexico Olympics, Carlos and Smith made headlines around the world by raising their black-gloved fists at the medal award ceremony. Both athletes wore black socks and no shoes on the podium to represent African-American poverty in the United States. In support, Peter Norman, the silver medalist who was a white athlete from Australia, participated in the protest by wearing an OPHR badge.

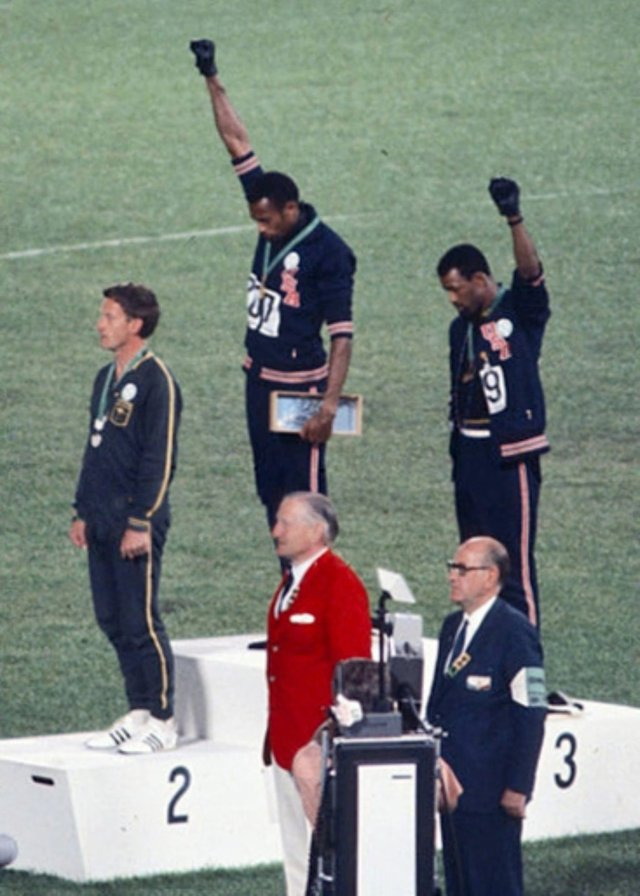
John Carlos (right) and Tommie Smith (center) showing the raised fist on the podium after the 200 m race at the 1968 Summer Olympics; both wear Olympic Project for Human Rights badges. Peter Norman (silver medalist, left) from Australia also wears an OPHR badge in solidarity with Smith and Carlos.

International Olympic Committee (IOC) president Avery Brundage deemed it to be a domestic political statement unfit for the supposedly apolitical, international forum the Olympic Games were claimed to be. In response to their actions, he ordered Smith and Carlos suspended from the US team and banned from the Olympic Village. When the US Olympic Committee refused, Brundage threatened to ban the entire US track team. This threat led to the expulsion of the two athletes from the Games.

A spokesman for the IOC called Smith and Carlos's actions "a deliberate and violent breach of the fundamental principles of the Olympic spirit." Brundage, who was president of the United States Olympic Committee in 1936, had made no objections against Nazi salutes during the Berlin Olympics. He argued that the Nazi salute, being a national salute at the time, was acceptable in a competition of nations, while the athletes' salute was not of a nation and therefore unacceptable.

Carlos had his greatest year in track and field in 1969, equaling the world 100-yard record of 9.1, winning the AAU 220-yard run, and leading San Jose State to its first NCAA championship with victories in the 100 and 220 and as a member of the 4×110-yard relay. He was featured on the cover of Track and Field News' May 1969 issue.

He was also the gold medalist at 200 meters at the 1967 Pan American Games in Winnipeg, Manitoba, Canada, and set indoor world bests in the 60-yard dash (5.9) and the indoor 220-yard dash (21.2).

The 1968 Olympics were in the middle of several significant events pertaining to the Civil Rights movement: Martin Luther King Jr. was assassinated on April 4, 1968, the Fair Housing Act law was passed on April 11, 1968, and the 1968 Olympics were in October 1968. At this time, countless protests around the country in response to the Vietnam War and US laws on individual human rights being actively fought for. The 1968 Olympics were broadcast nationally and internationally through television and radio, giving athletes a platform to share their thoughts on issues around the world in front of a large audience of people. The international press the games were given was a tool used in international relations during the cold war. Acts of peaceful protest by popular athletes in sports is something that is still very prevalent in today's society.

== Career ==
Following his track career, Carlos, a 15th-round selection in the 1970 NFL draft, tried professional football, but a knee injury curtailed his tryout with the Philadelphia Eagles of the National Football League. He then went on to the Canadian Football League where he played one season for the Montreal Alouettes. Following his retirement from football, Carlos worked for Puma, the United States Olympic Committee, the Organising Committee of the 1984 Summer Olympics and the City of Los Angeles.

In 1985, Carlos became a counselor and in-school suspension supervisor, as well as the track and field coach, at Palm Springs High School in California. In 2003, he was elected to the National Track & Field Hall of Fame. In 2005, a statue titled Victory Salute showing Carlos and Smith on the medal stand was constructed by political artist Rigo 23 and dedicated on the campus of San Jose State University.

In 2006, John Carlos delivered a eulogy at Peter Norman's funeral and was also a pallbearer at the ceremony, as was Tommie Smith.

In 2007, John Carlos was honored at the Trumpet Awards in Las Vegas, Nevada.

Carlos is the godfather of Chicago White Sox General Manager Kenny Williams. Carlos ran track with Williams's father in college.

In April 2008, Carlos was a torch-bearer for the Human Rights Torch, which ran in parallel to the 2008 Summer Olympics torch relay and focusing attention on China's human rights record.

On July 16, 2008, John Carlos and Tommie Smith accepted the Arthur Ashe Award for Courage for their salute, at the 2008 ESPY Awards held at NOKIA Theatre L.A. LIVE in Los Angeles, California.

On October 10, 2011, Carlos spoke and raised his fist at Occupy Wall Street. He said: "Today I am here for you. Why? Because I am you. We're here forty-three years later because there's a fight still to be won. This day is not for us but for our children to come." The following day he appeared on MSNBC and on Current TV's Countdown with Keith Olbermann.

In July 2018, Carlos attended the Socialism 2018 conference hosted by the International Socialist Organization.

== Personal life ==
Carlos married his first wife, Karen Benjamin "Kim" Groce, in 1965 when the two were still in high school. The two divorced in 1974, and in 1977, Kim committed suicide. He remarried to Charlene Norwood in 1984.

In 1986, Carlos was arrested for cocaine possession. After he was found guilty in court, he attended a drug rehabilitation program, after which his conviction was expunged.

Carlos has identified with various religions, including a period of Catholicism that brought him into conflict with Black Power ideologies. He later stated that he is no longer a Christian.

== Awards ==
- World Athletics Awards – President's award: 2020

Sporting positions
Preceded by (United States) Tommie Smith	Men's 200m Best Year Performance; 1969–1970	Succeeded by (Jamaica) Don Quarrie
