= Eric Bigby =

Australian sprinter (born 1940)

Eric James Bigby (born 6 March 1940) is an Australian former sprinter who competed in the 1964 Summer Olympics.
