= Men's 200 metres world record progression =

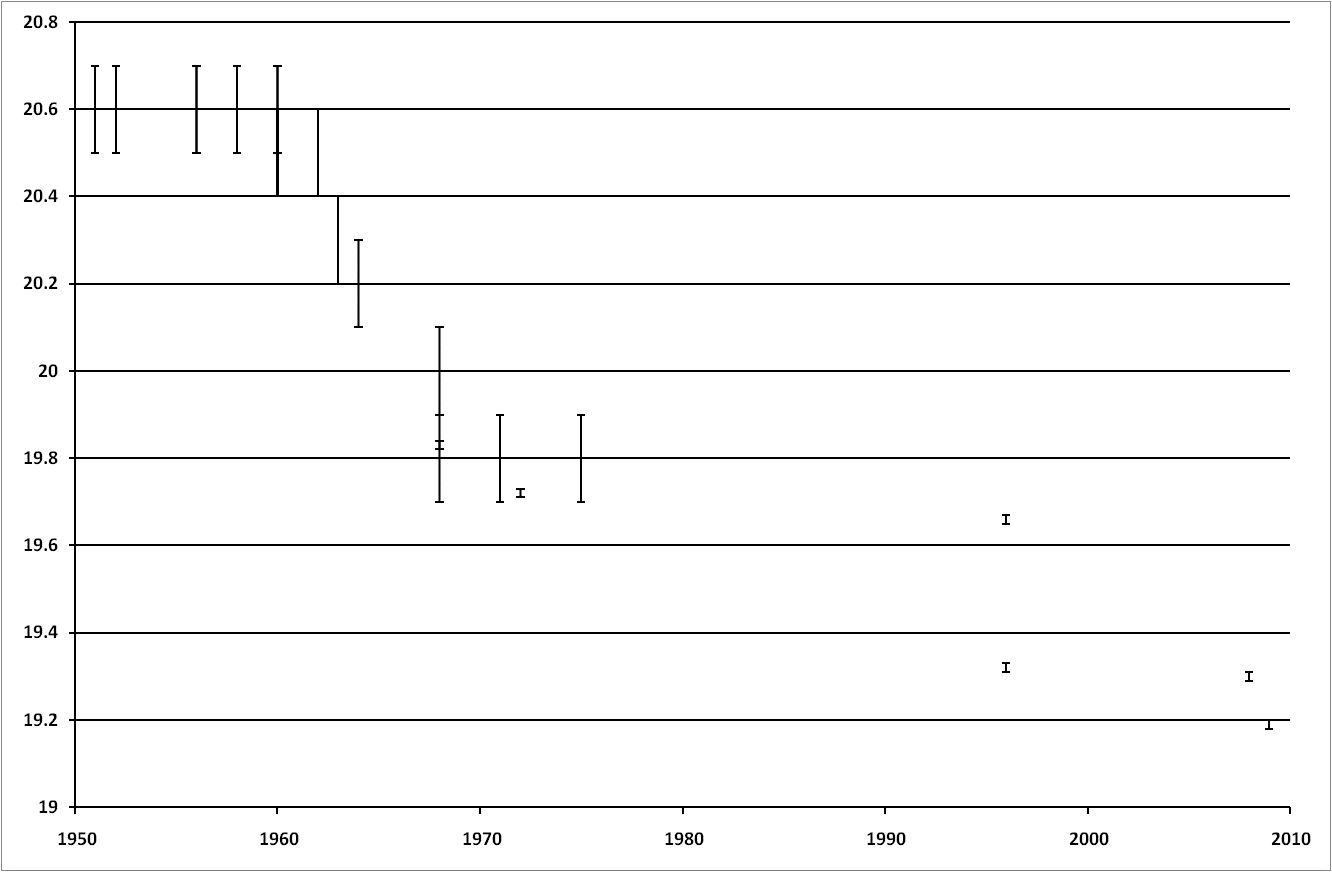
World record progression for the men's 200 m.

The following table shows the world record progression in the men's 200 metres, as ratified by the IAAF. The current record of 19.19 seconds was set by Usain Bolt at the 2009 World Championships in Athletics.

The IAAF maintained separate records for 200 m over a straight track and over a curved track until 1976, when records for the former were discarded. The IAAF ratified the first record for 200 m on a curved track in 1951. "y" denotes times for 220 yards (201.17 m) which were also ratified for the event.

As of 2018, the IAAF has ratified 24 outdoor world records in the event.

== Indoor ==
Indoor records are run on a shorter 200 metres track. "y" indicates marks were set over the 220 yards (201.17 m) imperial distance, and an asterisk indicates a record was repeated. Only Marie-Rose, Christie, and Fredericks' records were ratified by the IAAF.

Time	Athlete	Nationality	Location of race	Date
Manual timing
22.6y	Maxie Long	United States	Buffalo	19 January 1901
22.6y*	Loren Murchison	United States	Brooklyn	28 April 1919
22.4y	Loren Murchison	United States	New York	6 January 1925
22.2y	Loren Murchison	United States	New York	6 January 1925
22.2y*	Ted Ellison	United States	New York	1 March 1935
21.7y	Thomas Robinson	Bahamas	Chicago	18 January 1959
21.7y*	James Green	United States	Chicago	23 December 1967
21.6*	Dieter Hübner	West Germany	Stuttgart	2 March 1968
21.6	Bernd Jacob	West Germany	Stuttgart	2 March 1968
21.2y (Note: Some considered Carlos' time invalid for records as it was run on a dirt track.)	John Carlos	United States	East Lansing	14 February 1970
21.1y	Carl Lawson	Jamaica	Pocatello	2 March 1974
21.1	Günter Arnold	East Germany	Berlin-Est	18 January 1976
20.6y	Erwin Skamrahl	West Germany	Sindelfingen	11 February 1983
Electronic timing
21.43	Manfred Ommer	West Germany	Stuttgart	26 February 1972
21.40	Manfred Ommer	West Germany	Munich	23 February 1974
21.16	Karl-Heinz Weisenseel	West Germany	Stuttgart	22 February 1975
21.11	Karl-Heinz Weisenseel	West Germany	Sindelfingen	25 February 1978
21.11*	Pietro Mennea	Italy	Milan	4 March 1978
21.05	Mauro Zuliani	Italy	Genova	9 February 1980
20.99	Erwin Skamrahl	West Germany	Dortmund	13 February 1982
20.98	Ralf Lübke	West Germany	Sindelfingen	11 February 1983
20.77	Ralf Lübke	West Germany	Sindelfingen	12 February 1983
20.74	Pietro Mennea	Italy	Genova	13 February 1983
20.67	Ralf Lübke	West Germany	Stuttgart	10 February 1984
20.57	Ralf Lübke	West Germany	Stuttgart	11 February 1984
20.52	Stefano Tilli	Italy	Turin	21 February 1985
20.36	Bruno Marie-Rose	France	Liévin	22 February 1987
20.25	Linford Christie	Great Britain	Liévin	19 February 1995
19.92	Frank Fredericks	Namibia	Liévin	18 February 1996

== Outdoor ==
=== Records 1951–1976 ===
Time	Wind	Auto	Athlete	Nationality	Location of race	Date
20.6y			Andy Stanfield	United States	Philadelphia, United States	26 May 1951
20.6			Andy Stanfield	United States	Los Angeles, United States	28 June 1952
20.6	±0.0		Thane Baker	United States	Bakersfield, United States	23 June 1956
20.6		20.75	Bobby Morrow	United States	Melbourne, Australia	27 November 1956
20.6			Manfred Germar	West Germany	Wuppertal, Germany	1 October 1958
20.6y	−1.6		Ray Norton	United States	Berkeley, United States	19 March 1960
20.6			Ray Norton	United States	Philadelphia, United States	30 April 1960
20.5y			Peter Radford	United Kingdom	Wolverhampton, United Kingdom	28 May 1960
20.5	±0.0	20.75	Stone Johnson	United States	Stanford, United States	2 July 1960
20.5	±0.0		Ray Norton	United States	Stanford, United States	2 July 1960
20.5		20.65	Livio Berruti	Italy	Rome, Italy	3 September 1960
20.5	±0.0	20.62	Livio Berruti	Italy	Rome, Italy	3 September 1960
20.5y	−1.1	20.67	Paul Drayton	United States	Walnut, United States	23 June 1962
20.3y	−0.1		Henry Carr	United States	Tempe, United States	23 March 1963
20.2y	+0.5		Henry Carr	United States	Tempe, United States	4 April 1964
20.0y	±0.0		Tommie Smith	United States	Sacramento, United States	11 June 1966
19.8 A	+0.9	19.83 A	Tommie Smith	United States	Mexico City, Mexico	16 October 1968
19.8 A	+0.9	19.86 A	Don Quarrie	Jamaica	Cali, Colombia	3 August 1971
19.8y	+1.3		Don Quarrie	Jamaica	Eugene, United States	7 June 1975

The "Time" column indicates the ratified mark; the "Wind" column indicates the wind assistance in metres per second, 2.0 m/s the current maximum allowable, a negative indicates the mark was set running into a wind; the "Auto" column indicates a fully automatic time that was also recorded in the event when hand-timed marks were used for official records, or which was the basis for the official mark, rounded to the 10th or 100th of a second, depending on the rules then in place.

John Carlos ran 19.7A seconds (19.92A auto) (1.9 ms wind), at altitude, at the 1968 US Olympic Trials in Echo Summit. The run was not ratified as a world record because Carlos was wearing shoes with 'brush' spikes which did not have sanction as official footwear.

Henry Carr's winning time at the 1964 Olympics (17 October) was a hand timed 20.3 seconds. The electronic time was 20.36 seconds, which was the fastest auto time to that date. Tommie Smith ran 20.26 for 220 yards at Provo in 1967. By deducting .12 seconds for the 200-metre equivalent, he is estimated to have run 20.14 for that distance.

=== Records post-1977 ===
Beginning in 1975, the IAAF accepted separate automatically electronically timed records for events up to 400 metres. Starting on January 1, 1977, the IAAF required fully automatic timing to the hundredth of a second for these events.

Tommie Smith's 1968 Olympic gold medal victory was the fastest recorded fully electronic 200-metre sprint up to that time.

Time	Wind	Auto	Athlete	Nationality	Location of race	Date
19.83 A	+0.9		Tommie Smith	United States	Mexico City, Mexico	16 October 1968
19.72 A	+1.8		Pietro Mennea	Italy	Mexico City, Mexico	12 September 1979
19.66	+1.7		Michael Johnson	United States	Atlanta, United States	23 June 1996
19.32	+0.4	19.313	Michael Johnson	United States	Atlanta, United States	1 August 1996
19.30	−0.9	19.296	Usain Bolt	Jamaica	Beijing, China	20 August 2008
19.19	−0.3	19.190	Usain Bolt	Jamaica	Berlin, Germany	20 August 2009

The record progressions for automatic times at low altitude (after Carr's 20.36 in 1964) were 20.30 seconds by Valeriy Borzov at Helsinki in 1971, then Larry Black 20.28, 1972 at Munich, 20.00 (Borzov, 1972 also at Munich), 19.96 (Mennea, 1980), 19.75 (Carl Lewis, 1983), 19.75 (Joe DeLoach, 1988) and 19.73 (Michael Marsh, 1992), before Michael Johnson ran 19.66 in 1996.

== See also ==
- Women's 200 metres world record progression
- Men's 100 metres world record progression
