= Ian Green =

English sprinter (born 1946)

Personal information
- Nationality: British (English)
- Born: 13 January 1946 (age 80) Buckrose, East Riding of Yorkshire, England

Sport
- Sport: Athletics
- Event: Sprints
- Club: Luton United AC
Medal record
Athletics
Representing England
Commonwealth Games
Bronze medal – third place	1970 Edinburgh	4 x 100m relay

Ian David Green (born 13 January 1946), is a male former athlete who competed for England.

== Biography ==
Running for Luton United AC, Green finished second behind Don Halliday in the 100 metres event at the 1969 AAA Championships. He then competed in the 1969 European Athletics Championships.

He represented England and won a bronze medal in the 4 x 100 metres relay, at the 1970 British Commonwealth Games in Edinburgh, Scotland. Shortly after the Games, Green finished on the podium again at the 1970 AAA Championships.
