= Tony Powell (sprinter) =

Canadian sprinter

Personal information
- Nationality: Canadian
- Born: Anthony Joseph Burwood Powell; 13 September 1943 (age 83) Thetford, Norfolk, England

Sport
- Sport: Athletics
- Events: 4 × 400 metres relay, 100 metres, 200 metres, 400 metres, 4 x 100 metres relay
- Club: East York Track Club

Anthony Joseph Burwood Powell (born 13 September 1943) is a Canadian sprinter. He competed in Athletics at the 1969 Canada Games -Men's 200 metres, 400 metres, 4 x 100 metres relay and the 4 x 400 metres relay, winning four gold medals (one in each event). Powell competed in Athletics at the 1969 Pacific Conference Games – Men's 400 Metres (Bronze Medal) and anchored the Men's 4 x 400 metres relay (Silver Medal). In 1969, Powell was Canadian Champion in the 200 metres and 400 metres and was named "Outstanding Male Athlete" at the Canadian National Championships, Powell competed in Athletics at the 1970 Commonwealth Games – Men's 100 metres and 200 metres, and anchored the Men's 4 × 400 metres relay. In 1970, he was Canadian champion in the 400 metres. He also anchored the Men's 4 × 400 metres relay at the 1972 Olympic Games,

Powell was a member of McMaster University's Track Team from 1963 to 1967. In his final year led the team to the 1967 O.Q.A.A. Track and Field Championships. Powell also played goal for the 1963 Soccerams, helping them to McMaster's first O.Q.A.A. soccer championship. Powell was inducted into the McMaster Athletics Hall Of Fame in 1994. Powell competed in Masters Events in the 100 metres and 200 metres and in 2014 his 200 metres time was ranked second in the world in the 70-75 age group.
