= John Permal =

Pakistani sprinter (1946–2019)

John Permal (May 31, 1946 – March 27, 2019) was a Pakistani sprinter, who, for a decade (1964-1974), held the distinction of being the fastest man in Pakistan. Permal represented Pakistan at the 1972 Summer Olympics and the Asian Games in 1966 and 1970. He became Pakistan’s fastest man after finishing second in the 1965 Lahore Games. He also won a gold medal for Sindh in the 400 metres relay at the National Games at Dhaka in 1968.

== Early years ==
Born in Karachi, British India, Permal obtained his primary education from St. Anthony's School, and then St. Patrick's where he completed school. Permal used to sprint from his home in Saddar, Karachi, to his school, Saint Patrick's, every morning. He received a bachelor's degree in commerce in 1966.

== Sprinting career ==
From 1964 to 1974, Permal was considered to be the fastest man in Pakistan. He first became Pakistan's fastest man at the 1965 National Games in Lahore, where he actually finished second. He retained the 100 m fastest-man-in-Pakistan title in Rawalpindi in 1967, at Dhaka in 1968, at Karachi in 1970, at Nawabshah in 1971, and again in Lahore for the last time in 1973. His best time came in 1969 at a Bonn athletics meet where he clocked 10.4 seconds for the 100 metres event.

The biggest triumph of his athletic career was the gold medal that he won for Sindh in the 400 metres relay at the National Games at Dacca in 1968. During the pinnacle of his career, the international press considered him to be one of the most feared sprinters from his part of the world. He represented Pakistan with distinction at two Asian Games, both at Bangkok, in 1966 and 1970, and the Commonwealth Games in Edinburgh in 1970.

When interviewed by the local English daily, Dawn, Permal attributed his success on the track to the support of his school coach Jacob Harris.

== Later years ==
Having retired from sprinting in 1974, Permal took up a position with a travel agency in Saudi Arabia. Between 1976 and 1994 he worked in the travel industry.

== Personal life ==
Permal married Josephine in 1978 and they had three children. He returned to Pakistan in 1994.

== Death ==
In February 2019, Permal was reported to be suffering from pancreatic cancer. He died on 27 March 2019 while undergoing treatment for the disease. He was 72.
