= Dave Dear =

British sprinter

Personal information
- Nationality: British (English)
- Born: 8 June 1946 (age 80) Southampton, England

Sport
- Sport: Athletics
- Event: Sprints
- Club: Southampton & Eastleigh AAC
Medal record
Athletics
Representing England
British Commonwealth Games
Bronze medal – third place	1970 Edinburgh	4 x 100 metres relay

David Glyndwr Dear (born 8 June 1946 in Southampton) is a British former 100 metres sprinter.

== Athletics career ==
He competed in the 1972 Summer Olympics.

He represented the 1966 England team in the sprint events, at the 1966 British Empire and Commonwealth Games in Kingston, Jamaica.

Four years later he won a bronze medal at the 1970 British Commonwealth Games, in Edinburgh, Scotland.
