= Edward Owusu =

Ghanaian sprinter (born 1944)

Edward Owusu (born 15 March 1944) is a Ghanaian former sprinter who competed in the 1968 Summer Olympics.
