= Martin Reynolds (athlete) =

English sprinter

Personal information
- Nationality: British (English)
- Born: 22 February 1949 (age 77) Eton, Buckinghamshire, England
- Height: 185 cm (6 ft 1 in)
- Weight: 77 kg (170 lb)

Sport
- Sport: Athletics
- Event: Sprints
- Club: Thames Valley Harriers
Medal record
Men's Athletics
Representing Great Britain
Olympic Games
Silver medal – second place	1972 Munich	4x400 m relay
Summer Universiade
Gold medal – first place	1970 Turin	200 m
Representing England
Commonwealth Games
Bronze medal – third place	1970 Edinburgh	4x100 m relay

Martin Edward Reynolds (born 22 February 1949) is a British former track and field athlete who competed mainly in the 200 metres and appeared at the 1972 Summer Olympics.

== Biography ==
Reynolds became the British 200 metres champion after winning the British AAA Championships title at the 1970 AAA Championships. Shortly afterwards he represented England and won a bronze medal in the 4 x 100 metres relay, at the 1970 British Commonwealth Games in Edinburgh, Scotland.

Reynolds competed for Great Britain at the 1972 Summer Olympics held in Munich, where he won the silver medal with his team mates Alan Pascoe, David Hemery and David Jenkins in the men's 4x400 metres relay event. He had to switch to the 400 metres in the Olympic year which was also the year of his final exams at university. He competed in more 400 metres events at Munich than he had done in his entire career up to that point.
