= Obedi Mwanga =

Tanzanian sprinter

Personal information
- Nationality: Tanzanian
- Born: 1 December 1940 (age 85)

Sport
- Sport: Sprinting
- Event: 4 × 100 metres relay

Obedi Mwanga (born 1 December 1940) is a Tanzanian sprinter. He competed in the men's 4 × 100 metres relay at the 1972 Summer Olympics.
