= Les Piggot =

British sprinter (1942–2022)

Personal information
- Nationality: British (Scottish)
- Born: 11 May 1942 Glasgow, Scotland
- Died: 30 October 2022 (aged 80) East Kilbride, Scotland
- Height: 180 cm (5 ft 11 in)
- Weight: 70 kg (154 lb)

Sport
- Sport: Athletics
- Event: Sprints
- Club: Garscube Harriers

Leslie MacDonald Piggot (11 May 1942 – 30 October 2022) was a British sprinter who competed in the 1972 Summer Olympics.

== Biography ==
Piggot was born in Rutherglen on 11 May 1942. He played rugby and competed in athletics at school but was involved in a serious car accident after leaving school.

In 1968, Piggot married fellow sprinter Morag Carmichael. Piggot finished second behind Brian Green in the 100 metres event at the 1971 AAA Championships and on two further occasions finished third at both the 1972 AAA Championships and 1973 AAA Championships.

At the 1972 Olympics Games in Munich, he represented Great Britain in the 100 metres and 4 x 100 metres relay. At retirement he had represented Great Britain between 1965 and 1976 over 50 times and had won 14 medals at the Scottish Championships (the last in 1976 when he defeated Allan Wells).

He died in East Kilbride on 30 October 2022, at the age of 80.
