= Don Halliday =

Scottish sprinter (born 1947)

Personal information
- Nationality: British (Scottish)
- Born: 16 June 1947 (age 79) Perth, Scotland
- Height: 174 cm (5 ft 9 in)
- Weight: 65 kg (143 lb)

Sport
- Sport: Athletics
- Event: Sprints
- Club: Wolverhampton & Bilston AC; RAF AC

Donald George Halliday (born 16 June 1947) is a Scottish former sprinter who competed in the 100 metres at the 1972 Summer Olympics.

== Biography ==
Halliday finished second behind Ron Jones in the 100 metres event at the British 1969 AAA Championships. He also achieved the first of his three Scottish 100 metres titles in 1969 (the others coming in 1973 and 1974.

He represented Scotland at the 1970 British Commonwealth Games in Edinburgh and in 1971, Halliday finished third behind Brian Green at the 1971 AAA Championships in addition to winning the AAA indoor 60 metres title.

At the 1972 Olympics Games in Munich, he represented Great Britain in the 100 metres and 4 x 100 metres events. The following year Halliday finally became the British 100 metres champion after winning the British AAA Championships title at the 1973 AAA Championships.

He continued his success in 1974, winning the Scottish Championships over 200 metres (in addition to his 100 metres win), claiming a second AAA indoor 60 metres title and representing Scotland again at the 1974 British Commonwealth Games. He was also considered the British 100 metres champion again by virtue of being the highest placed British athlete at the 1974 AAA Championships.
