= Rocky Thompson (American football) =

American football player (born 1947)

No. 22
- Position: Running back

Personal information
- Born: November 8, 1947 (age 78); Paget, Bermuda
- Listed height: 5 ft 11 in (1.80 m)
- Listed weight: 200 lb (91 kg)

Career information
- College: West Texas State
- NFL draft: 1971: 1st round, 18th overall pick

Career history
- New York Giants (1971–1973)

Career NFL statistics
- Rushing attempts-yards: 68-217
- Receptions-yards: 16-85
- Touchdowns: 3
- Stats at Pro Football Reference

Ralph Gary "Rocky" Thompson-Symonds (born November 8, 1947) is a Bermudan former professional American football player for the New York Giants in the National Football League (NFL).

Thompson, a running back/wide receiver, played college football at Hartnell College and West Texas State, where he was the roommate of future Dallas Cowboys star Duane Thomas. Thompson also competed on Hartnell's soccer team.

Thompson was a world-class sprinter who won the AAA Championships 100 metres in 1970 with a time of 10.1 seconds, and representing Bermuda, he reached the final of the 100 metres at the 1970 British Commonwealth Games, finishing sixth.

The Giants drafted Thompson in the first round of the 1971 NFL draft with the 18th overall selection. He appeared in all 28 regular-season games for the Giants in 1971 and 1972, primarily as a kickoff returner, but his NFL career was ended by a severe neck injury during play. The Giants subsequently released Thompson before the start of the 1974 season.

Shortly after Thompson was selected in the first round of the 1971 draft out of West Texas State, The New York Times reported that Rocky Thompson is listed in Bermuda and in official Brit track records as Ralph Gary Symonds. Thompson explained that his mother's maiden name was Symonds but when she remarried he took his stepfather's name of "Thompson." But he competed at track under his mother's maiden name, and later as Rocky Thompson-Symonds, since his mother had also ran track for Bermuda.

Thompson was born in Bermuda and grew up there as well as in Yokohama, Japan. He was the nephew of Calvin Symonds.

After retirement, Thompson became an assistant coach for the Columbia Lions football team in 1985.
