= Errol Stewart (sprinter) =

Jamaican former sprinter (born 1950)

Errol Stewart (born 2 March 1950) is a Jamaican former sprinter who competed in the 1968 Summer Olympics. He was born in Kingston, Jamaica. He was also a gold medallist at the 1970 British Commonwealth Games with the Jamaican 4×100 metres relay team.

Stewart was introduced to track and field by running lamp post to lamp post in Kingston, Jamaica to decide who was the fastest on his block. Before 1968, his 100 metres best was only 10.7 seconds, but by the time the Olympics started he improved to 10.1 seconds.

Stewart was an All-American sprinter for the UTEP Miners track and field team, finishing 3rd in the 100 m at the 1972 NCAA University Division Outdoor Track and Field Championships.
