= Calvin Greenaway =

Antigua and Barbuda sprinter

Personal information
- Nationality: Antigua and Barbuda
- Born: 5 November 1948
- Died: 14 January 2016 (aged 67) Pembroke Pines, Florida, U.S.

Sport
- Sport: Sprinting
- Event: 4 × 100 metres relay

Calvin Greenaway (5 November 1948 – 14 January 2016) was an Antigua and Barbuda sprinter. He competed in the men's 4 × 100 metres relay at the 1976 Summer Olympics.

Greenaway was raised in Antigua and studied at the University of East London in England. He competed there as a sprinter and as the captain of their volleyball team. He is also an Antiguan national record holder in pole vault. He jumped the record 380 in Newham, United Kingdom in June 1973.

Outside of athletics, he worked as a land surveyor for the Antiguan government, serving as the Chief Surveyor in the Lands and Survey Department for Antigua & Barbuda until his retirement in 2009. He moved to Florida, U.S. after his retirement, where be died in 2016.
