= Brian Green (athlete) =

British sprinter (born 1941)

Personal information
- Nationality: British (English)
- Born: 15 May 1941 Ormskirk, England
- Died: 7 December 2025 (aged 84) Southport, England
- Height: 166 cm (5 ft 5 in)
- Weight: 68 kg (150 lb)

Sport
- Sport: Athletics
- Event: Sprints
- Club: Pilkington Harriers, St. Helens
Medal record
Athletics
Representing England
Commonwealth Games
Bronze medal – third place	1970 Edinburgh	4 x 100m relay

Brian William Green (born 15 May 1941) is a British former sprinter.

== Biography ==
Green attended Walton Grammar School and worked as an advertising assistant. He came to sprinting late, having previously divided his time between other sporting interests including squash, badminton, and hockey.

Standing at 1.66 m (5 ft 5 in) Green was once told he was too short to be a sprinter. Despite this, at the age of 31, Green became the fastest man in Britain, recording a time of 10.1 seconds in Bratislava.

Green was second behind Gary Symonds in the 100 metres event at the 1970 AAA Championships but by virtue of being the highest placed British athlete was considered the British 100 metres champion. Shortly afterwards he represented England and won a bronze medal at the 1970 British Commonwealth Games in the 4×100 metres relay.

After winning the AAA title in 1971, Green competed in the 1972 Summer Olympics, participating in the 100 metres, 200 metres and 4×100 metres relay. Green also finished runner-up in the 100 metres at both the 1972 AAA Championships and 1973 AAA Championships.

He represented England in the sprint events, at the 1974 British Commonwealth Games in Christchurch, New Zealand and represented England in the 100 metres and 4×100 metres relay at the 1978 Commonwealth Games in Edmonton, Canada.
