= 1972 Olympics Black Power salute =

Political protest at the 1972 Summer Olympics

The 1972 Olympics Black Power salute was a political protest by two U.S. Olympic runners, Vincent Matthews and Wayne Collett, during the medal ceremony for the Men's 400 metres at the 1972 Summer Olympics in Munich, West Germany. This event is sometimes referred to as "The Forgotten Protest". It came four years after the 1968 Olympics Black Power salute, and was overshadowed by the Munich massacre.

== Before the Games ==
Matthews was a 1968 Olympian who had retired. He was frustrated by problems that included having to pay for his own travel to the US trials.

== Protest ==
In the Men's 400 metres, Matthews won gold and Collett won silver.

During the medal ceremony, both runners refused to stand at attention for the US national anthem. They subsequently stroked their beards, and twirled their medals as they left the stadium. The German crowd booed both runners for their display.

== Media reaction ==
The Associated Press described the casual behavior of Matthews and Collett during the playing of the anthem as "disrespectful," and described the event as follows:

Collett, bare-footed, leaped from the No. 2 tier to the No. 1 stand beside his teammate. They stood sideways to the flag, twirling their medals, with Matthews stroking his chin. Their shoulders slumped, neither stood erect nor looked at the flag. ... As whistles and catcalls continued, Collett raised a clenched fist to the crowd before entering the portal of the dressing room.

Robert Markus reported in the Chicago Tribune on September 9, 1972:

[Matthews] was angry at Coach Bill Bowerman—as most of the U.S. trackmen seem to be—because Bowerman had hinted he would like to remove him from the place he had earned in the 400-meter field. He was angry that he had been forced to train on his own in unsuitable facilities, had to travel 4 or 5 times from N.Y. to the west coast in order to get any kind of competition, and had been put down by some of the press as a drag on America's hopes for a 400-meter sweep.

The Chicago Tribune further reported:

Matthews said his and Collett's actions were directed at the U.S. coaching staff, not the flag or the National Anthem. "We were just mad about a lot of things. We didn't think it would blow up like this. We were asked to apologize. I'm not really sorry for what I did. I'm sorry for the way people took it [hoots and whistles from the stands when the anthem finished]. What I tried to get across to the Olympic Committee was if it was pre-meditated I could have done something better than that. It was just something that happened. We didn't realize the implications to the people in the stands."

In an interview after the medal ceremony with the American Broadcasting Company, Collett said the national anthem meant nothing to him. He explained that he had felt unable to honor the anthem, because of the struggle faced by African Americans at the time: "I couldn't stand there and sing the words because I don't believe they're true. I wish they were. I believe we have the potential to have a beautiful country, but I don't think we do." The pair were banned from future Olympic competition by the International Olympic Committee (IOC). IOC president Avery Brundage deemed it to be a domestic political statement unfit for the apolitical, international forum the Olympic Games were intended to be. Since John Smith had pulled a hamstring 80 meters into the final while leading and had been ruled unfit to run, the U.S. were now unable to field a team in the 4 × 400 meter relay and were forced to scratch from the event.

=== Athlete statements ===
Matthews stated:

I wasn't acting any differently than I usually do, but we were like goldfish in a fishbowl, in front of all those people. If they wanted me to stand at attention, I could've probably done that, but it wouldn't be me, and I was led to believe that the Olympics was for the athlete. We consider ourselves athletes, not politicians, or marching bands. Our athletic competition was over, and we were both happy.

== After the Games ==
Both runners received a life ban from the IOC. This ban also forced the US to scratch from the 4 × 400 meter relay, where the Americans would have been favored to win.

Both runners were eventually elected to the Black Olympian Hall of Fame. This display by the athletes would be overshadowed by the Munich massacre.

Collett went on to become a lawyer.

In 2011, Matthews was elected to the USATF Hall of Fame.

In December 2022, the life bans were lifted by the IOC: while Matthews was still alive at the time, Collett had died of cancer in 2010.
