= HSI (track team) =

Track and field training group

Hudson Smith International (or simply HSI), is a track and field training group and team centered on former UCLA coach John Smith and sports agent and attorney Emanuel Hudson. The group was formed in 1996 after Smith, a former sprinter who competed at the 1972 Summer Olympics, had led Quincy Watts and Kevin Young to gold medals at the 1992 Olympics.

Past members of the group include Olympic medalists Maurice Greene, Ato Boldon, Allen Johnson, Tasha Danvers, Inger Miller, Jon Drummond and Dawn Harper. From its inception, the team dominated global sprinting events for a decade. Members of the team have combined to run relays under the HSI banner. Team members were known for their boasting and brashness.

As the world record holder in the 100 metres from 1999 to 2002, Greene was the most publicized of HSI's athletes. From 1997 to 2001, Greene dominated the field in that event at the World Athletics Championships and Olympics, his closest competitor frequently being Boldon. Johnson had a similar winning streak in the 110 metres hurdles between 1995 and 2003.

== American members ==
- Christian Coleman 2 World Championship silver medals, World Indoor Championship Gold Medal, World Indoor record holder for the 60 meter dash
- Dalilah Muhammad Olympic Gold Medal, 2 World Championship silver medals
- English Gardner 1 Olympic Gold Medal, 2 World Championship silver medals
- Dawn Harper 2 Olympic medals, 1 gold, 2 World Championship medals
- Kristi Castlin 1 Olympic bronze medal
- Michael Norman 2 World Junior Championship gold medals, World Indoor 400m record holder
- Dezerea Bryant 1 World Championship silver medal
- Jon Drummond 2 Olympic medals, 1 gold, 2 World Championship gold medals
- Torri Edwards 1 Olympic medal, 4 World Championship medals, including 2 gold
- Kenneth Ferguson
- Maurice Greene 4 Olympic medals, 2 gold, 5 World Championship gold medals, 100 metre world record-holder from 1999 to 2002
- Regina Jacobs 2 World Championship silver medals
- Allen Johnson Olympic gold medal, 5 World Championship medals, 4 gold
- Lawrence Johnson Olympic silver medal
- Inger Miller 1 Olympic gold medal, 5 World Championship medals, including 2 gold
- David Neville 2 Olympic medals, 1 gold
- Jason Pyrah
- Jason Richardson Olympic silver medal, World Championship gold medal
- Quincy Watts 2 Olympic gold medals, 2 World Championship medals, including 1 gold
- Kevin Young Olympic gold medal former 400 metres hurdles world record-holder, 1 World Championship gold medal
- Leonard Scott World Indoor Championship Gold Medal

== International members ==
The members of the training group were not limited to American athletes. Athletes from several countries trained together in Los Angeles.

- Hussein Taher Al-Sabee Saudi Arabia
- Hadi Soua'an Al-Somaily Saudi Arabia Olympic silver medal
- Ato Boldon Trinidad and Tobago 4 Olympic medals, 4 World Championship medals, 1 gold
- Emmanuel Callender Trinidad and Tobago 2 Olympic medals, 1 World Championship medal
- Tasha Danvers United Kingdom 1 Olympic medal
- Cathy Freeman Australia trained with the group for a short period of time. 2 Olympic medals, 1 gold, 2 World Championship gold medals
- Anju Bobby George India first World Championship medal for India
- Jehue Gordon Trinidad and Tobago 1 World Championship gold medal
- Khalifa St. Fort Trinidad and Tobago 1 World Championship bronze medal
- Martial Mbandjock France
- Pilar McShine Trinidad and Tobago
- Jaysuma Saidy Ndure Norway
- Marie-José Pérec France 3 Olympic gold medals, 2 World Championship gold medals
- Mohammed Shaween Saudi Arabia
- Richard Thompson Trinidad and Tobago 3 Olympic medals, 1 World Championship medal
- Teddy Venel France
- Rhonda Watkins Trinidad and Tobago
