= Athletics at the 1972 Summer Olympics – Men's 400 metres =

Men's 400 metres at the Games of the XX Olympiad
- Venue: Olympic Stadium, Munich, West Germany
- Date: 3 September 1972; 4 September 1972; 7 September 1972
- Competitors: 64 from 49 nations
- Winning time: 44.66

Medalists
1st place, gold medalist(s)		Vince Matthews; United States
2nd place, silver medalist(s)		Wayne Collett; United States
3rd place, bronze medalist(s)		Julius Sang; Kenya

The men's 400 metres was an event at the 1972 Summer Olympics in Munich. The competition was held on 3, 4 and 7 September. Sixty-four athletes from 49 nations competed. The maximum number of athletes per nation had been set at 3 since the 1930 Olympic Congress. The event was won by 0.14 seconds by Vince Matthews of the United States, the nation's fifth consecutive and 12th overall victory in the event (all by different men). The Americans' hopes to repeat their podium sweep of four years earlier were dashed by injury in the final. Bronze medalist Julius Sang became the first black African to win a sprint Olympic medal, earning Kenya's first medal in the event.

On the victory podium, Vince Matthews and Wayne Collett talked to each other and failed to stand at attention during the medal ceremony. On the advice of Avery Brundage, the International Olympic Committee banned them from further competition. Since the third American competitor, John Smith, had pulled a hamstring while leading 80 metres into the final and had been ruled unfit to run, the United States were left unable to field a 4 x 400 relay team, and were thus forced to scratch from the event.

== Background ==
This was the seventeenth appearance of the event, which is one of 12 athletics events to have been held at every Summer Olympics. Three finalists, but no medalists, from 1968 returned: fourth-place finisher Amadou Gakou of Senegal, sixth-place Tegegne Bezabeh of Ethiopia, and seventh-place Andrzej Badeński of Poland (who had won bronze in 1964). Despite the complete turnover from their 1968 podium sweep, the United States team was again favored—this time led by John Smith, the 440-yard world record holder and AAU champion.

Dahomey, Cambodia, the Republic of the Congo, Fiji, Kuwait, Lebanon, Madagascar, Malawi, Paraguay, Peru, Saudi Arabia, and Zambia appeared in this event for the first time. The United States made its seventeenth appearance in the event, the only nation to compete in it at every Olympic Games to that point.

== Competition format ==
The competition retained the basic four-round format from 1920. The "fastest loser" system, introduced in 1964, was applied in the first round and quarterfinals. There were 9, each scheduled to have 7 or 8 athletes but some with only 6 starters. The top four runners in each heat advanced to the quarterfinals along with the next four fastest overall. The 5 quarterfinals each had 8 runners; the top three athletes in each quarterfinal heat advanced to the semifinals, with one spot for the next fastest finisher. The semifinals featured 2 heats of 8 runners each. The top four runners in each semifinal heat advanced, making an eight-man final.

== Records ==
Prior to the competition, the existing World and Olympic records were as follows.

World record	Lee Evans (USA)	43.86	Mexico City, Mexico	18 October 1968
Olympic record	Lee Evans (USA)	43.86	Mexico City, Mexico	18 October 1968

No world or Olympic records were set during this event.

== Schedule ==
All times are Central European Time (UTC+1)

Date	Time	Round
Sunday, 3 September 1972	16:00	Round 1
Monday, 4 September 1972	11:35; 17:45	Quarterfinals; Semifinals
Thursday, 7 September 1972	17:30	Final

== Results ==
=== Round 1 ===
The top four runners in each of the nine heats (darker green) and the next four fastest (lighter green), advanced to the quarterfinal round.

==== Heat 1 ====
Rank	Lane	Athlete	Nation	Time	Notes
1	4	Andrzej Badeński	Poland	46.21	Q
2	3	Charles Joseph	Trinidad and Tobago	46.38	Q
3	5	Mulugetta Tadesse	Ethiopia	46.38	Q
4	7	Wickremasinghe Wimaladasa	Ceylon	46.62	Q
5	2	Bjarni Sefánsson	Iceland	46.76	q
6	6	Jozo Alebić	Yugoslavia	47.01	
7	8	Silver Ayoo	Uganda	47.04	
8	1	Nusrat Iqbal Sahi	Pakistan	49.57	

==== Heat 2 ====
Rank	Lane	Athlete	Nation	Time	Notes
1	2	David Jenkins	Great Britain	46.15	Q
2	7	Anders Faager	Sweden	46.29	Q
3	8	Munyoro Nyamau	Kenya	46.33	Q
4	5	Omar Ghizlat	Morocco	46.37	Q
5	3	Bruce Ijirighwo	Nigeria	46.59	q
6	6	Samuela Yavala	Fiji	47.76	
7	1	Théophile Nkounkou	Republic of the Congo	47.86	
8	4	Francisco Menocal	Nicaragua	50.96	

==== Heat 3 ====
Rank	Lane	Athlete	Nation	Time	Notes
1	8	Georg Nückles	West Germany	46.64	Q
2	6	Yoshiharu Tomonaga	Japan	47.01	Q
3	3	Francis Kerbiriou	France	47.01	Q
4	1	Sam Bugri	Ghana	47.83	Q
5	2	Thomas N'Ma	Liberia	49.73	
6	5	Jean-Max Faustin	Haiti	52.33	
—	—	Marcello Fiasconaro	Italy	DNS	
—	—	Michael Frederiksson	Sweden	DNS	

==== Heat 4 ====
Rank	Lane	Athlete	Nation	Time	Notes
1	5	Alberto Juantorena	Cuba	45.94	Q
2	1	Wayne Collett	United States	46.00	Q
3	3	Claver Kamanya	Tanzania	46.18	Q
4	4	Gilles Bertould	France	46.36	Q
5	2	Eric Phillips	Venezuela	46.74	q
6	7	Pedro Ferrer	Puerto Rico	47.90	
7	7	Nicodemus Maipampe	Zambia	48.84	

==== Heat 5 ====
Rank	Lane	Athlete	Nation	Time	Notes
1	2	Tegegne Bezabeh	Ethiopia	45.88	Q
2	1	Vince Matthews	United States	45.94	Q
3	7	Angelo Hussein	Sudan	47.01	Q
4	3	Robert Ojo	Nigeria	47.03	Q
5	5	Fanahan McSweeney	Ireland	47.07	
6	6	Fernando Silva	Portugal	47.67	
7	4	Kassem Hamzé	Lebanon	49.20	

==== Heat 6 ====
Rank	Lane	Athlete	Nation	Time	Notes
1	8	Charles Asati	Kenya	45.16	Q
2	5	Leighton Priestley	Jamaica	45.75	Q
3	2	Fernando Acevedo	Peru	45.80	Q
4	6	Jan Werner	Poland	45.93	Q
5	4	Gary Armstrong	Great Britain	46.48	q
6	3	Francisco Rojas	Paraguay	47.46	
7	1	Brian MacLaren	Canada	47.65	
—	—	Caspar Springer	Barbados	DNF	

==== Heat 7 ====
Rank	Lane	Athlete	Nation	Time	Notes
1	5	Julius Sang	Kenya	45.24	Q
2	1	Martin Reynolds	Great Britain	46.46	Q
3	2	Daniel Velasques	France	46.70	Q
4	3	Karl Honz	West Germany	46.77	Q
5	7	Franklin Rahming	Bahamas	48.30	
6	6	Ibrahima Idrissou	Dahomey	48.50	
7	4	William Msiska	Malawi	48.81	

==== Heat 8 ====
Rank	Lane	Athlete	Nation	Time	Notes
1	3	Horst-Rüdiger Schlöske	West Germany	45.27	Q
2	7	John Smith	United States	46.00	Q
3	1	Kyriakos Onisiforou	Greece	46.94	Q
4	5	Reza Entezari	Iran	47.89	Q
5	6	Mohamed Saad	Kuwait	49.61	
6	4	Mohamed Jaman Al-Dosari	Saudi Arabia	49.67	
—	—	Lucijano Sušanj	Yugoslavia	DNS	

==== Heat 9 ====
Rank	Lane	Athlete	Nation	Time	Notes
1	6	Markku Kukkoaho	Finland	46.05	Q
2	3	Zbigniew Jaremski	Poland	46.20	Q
3	7	Arthur Cooper	Trinidad and Tobago	47.15	Q
4	8	Amadou Gakou	Senegal	47.68	Q
5	4	Tambusamy Krishnan	Malaysia	48.31	
6	1	Frédérique Andrianaivo	Madagascar	48.72	
7	5	Savin Chem	Khmer Republic	48.82	
—	—	Jimmy Sierra	Colombia	DNS	

=== Quarterfinals ===
The top three runners in each of the five heats, and the next fastest, advanced to the semifinal round.

==== Quarterfinal 1 ====
Rank	Lane	Athlete	Nation	Time	Notes
1	2	Wayne Collett	United States	45.80	Q
2	6	Alberto Juantorena	Cuba	45.96	Q
3	7	Jan Werner	Poland	46.02	Q
4	5	Martin Reynolds	Great Britain	46.11	q
5	1	Charles Joseph	Trinidad and Tobago	46.14	
6	8	Robert Ojo	Nigeria	46.73	
7	4	Omar Ghizlat	Morocco	46.84	
8	3	Sam Bugri	Ghana	47.34	

==== Quarterfinal 2 ====
Rank	Lane	Athlete	Nation	Time	Notes
1	2	Horst-Rüdiger Schlöske	West Germany	45.41	Q
2	3	Vince Matthews	United States	45.62	Q
3	6	Tegegne Bezabeh	Ethiopia	45.97	Q
4	1	Gilles Bertould	France	46.14	
5	5	Wickremasinghe Wimaladasa	Ceylon	46.50	
6	7	Leighton Priestley	Jamaica	47.76	
7	4	Arthur Cooper	Trinidad and Tobago	48.29	
8	8	Reza Entezari	Iran	48.69	

==== Quarterfinal 3 ====
Rank	Lane	Athlete	Nation	Time	Notes
1	7	David Jenkins	Great Britain	45.99	Q
2	8	John Smith	United States	46.04	Q
3	4	Markku Kukkoaho	Finland	46.11	Q
4	3	Munyoro Nyamau	Kenya	46.80	
5	2	Bruce Ijirighwo	Nigeria	46.81	
6	6	Daniel Velasques	France	46.91	
7	5	Amadou Gakou	Senegal	46.96	
8	1	Angelo Hussein	Sudan	47.33	

==== Quarterfinal 4 ====
Rank	Lane	Athlete	Nation	Time	Notes
1	3	Karl Honz	West Germany	45.87	Q
2	7	Julius Sang	Kenya	45.92	Q
3	5	Zbigniew Jaremski	Poland	46.52	Q
4	1	Anders Faager	Sweden	46.54	
5	4	Francis Kerbiriou	France	46.63	
6	2	Yoshiharu Tomonaga	Japan	46.92	
7	6	Gary Armstrong	Great Britain	47.10	
8	8	Kyriakos Onisiforou	Greece	47.22	

==== Quarterfinal 5 ====
Rank	Lane	Athlete	Nation	Time	Notes
1	1	Charles Asati	Kenya	46.04	Q
2	5	Andrzej Badeński	Poland	46.19	Q
3	4	Georg Nückles	West Germany	46.30	Q
4	8	Claver Kamanya	Tanzania	46.55	
5	6	Mulugetta Tadesse	Ethiopia	46.85	
6	7	Bjarni Stefánsson	Iceland	46.92	
7	2	Eric Phillips	Venezuela	46.97	
—	3	Fernando Acevedo	Peru	DNS	

=== Semifinals ===
Top four in each of the two heats advanced to the final round.

==== Semifinal 1 ====
Rank	Lane	Athlete	Nation	Time	Notes
1	4	Vince Matthews	United States	44.94	Q
2	3	Karl Honz	West Germany	45.32	Q
3	1	John Smith	United States	45.46	Q
4	2	Charles Asati	Kenya	45.47	Q
5	8	David Jenkins	Great Britain	45.91	
6	6	Tegegne Bezabeh	Ethiopia	45.98	
7	5	Georg Nückles	West Germany	46.28	
8	7	Andrzej Badeński	Poland	46.38	

==== Semifinal 2 ====
Rank	Lane	Athlete	Nation	Time	Notes
1	1	Julius Sang	Kenya	45.30	Q
2	3	Horst-Rüdiger Schlöske	West Germany	45.62	Q
3	2	Wayne Collett	United States	45.77	Q
4	4	Markku Kukkoaho	Finland	46.02	Q
5	5	Alberto Juantorena	Cuba	46.07	
6	8	Jan Werner	Poland	46.26	
7	7	Martin Reynolds	Great Britain	46.71	
—	6	Zbigniew Jaremski	Poland	DNS	

=== Final ===
Smith was leading at 80 metres when he pulled his hamstring and could not finish.

Rank	Lane	Athlete	Nation	Time
1st place, gold medalist(s)	2	Vince Matthews	United States	44.66
2nd place, silver medalist(s)	3	Wayne Collett	United States	44.80
3rd place, bronze medalist(s)	5	Julius Sang	Kenya	44.92
4	8	Charles Asati	Kenya	45.13
5	7	Horst-Rüdiger Schlöske	West Germany	45.31
6	4	Markku Kukkoaho	Finland	45.49
7	1	Karl Honz	West Germany	45.68
—	6	John Smith	United States	DNF
