= Arthur Cooper (athlete) =

Trinidad and Tobago sprinter

Personal information
- Nationality: Trinidad and Tobago
- Born: 10 May 1952 (age 74)

Sport
- Sport: Sprinting
- Event: 400 metres

Arthur Cooper (born 10 May 1952) is a Trinidad and Tobago sprinter. He competed in the men's 400 metres at the 1972 Summer Olympics. He attended Seton Hall University, where he was part of the NCAA record-setting 4 x 440 yard relay team in 1974.
