= Gary Armstrong (athlete) =

British sprinter (born 1952)

Personal information
- Nationality: British (English)
- Born: 9 April 1952 (age 74) Manchester, England
- Height: 181 cm (5 ft 11 in)
- Weight: 65 kg (143 lb)

Sport
- Sport: Athletics
- Event: Sprinting/400 metres
- Club: Manchester AC

Gary Armstrong (born 9 April 1952) is a British sprinter who competed at the 1972 Summer Olympics.

== Biography ==
Armstrong born in manchester, was a bank clerk and a member of Manchester Athletic Club and set a junior world record as part of the British 4 x 400 metres team on 26 September 1971. The team consisted of Armstrong, David Jenkins, Desmond Coneys and Joe Caines. He was also the Northern 400 metres champion in 1971.

Armstrong finished second behind David Jenkins in the 400 metres event at the 1972 AAA Championships. Shortly afterwards he represented Great Britain at the 1972 Olympics Games in Munich in the men's 400 metres event. He was left out of the relay team that won the Olympic silver medal at the same Games, partially as a result of only recently overcoming a hamstring injury. He was replaced by Alan Pascoe.

Armstrong continued to fight for a 1976 Olympics place but ultimately was not selected.
