= Mulugetta Tadesse =

Ethiopian sprinter

Personal information
- Nationality: Ethiopian
- Born: 24 July 1946 (age 79)

Sport
- Sport: Sprinting
- Event: 400 metres

Mulugetta Tadesse (born 24 July 1946) is an Ethiopian sprinter. He competed in the men's 400 metres at the 1972 Summer Olympics.

He won the bronze medal at the 1973 All-Africa Games in the 400 metres event.
