= Franklin Rahming =

Bahamian sprinter

Personal information
- Nationality: Bahamian
- Born: 25 May 1945 (age 81)

Sport
- Sport: Sprinting
- Event: 400 metres

Franklin Benjamin Rahming (born 25 May 1945) is a Bahamian sprinter. He competed in the men's 400 metres at the 1972 Summer Olympics.
