= Raised fist =

Symbol of solidarity and support

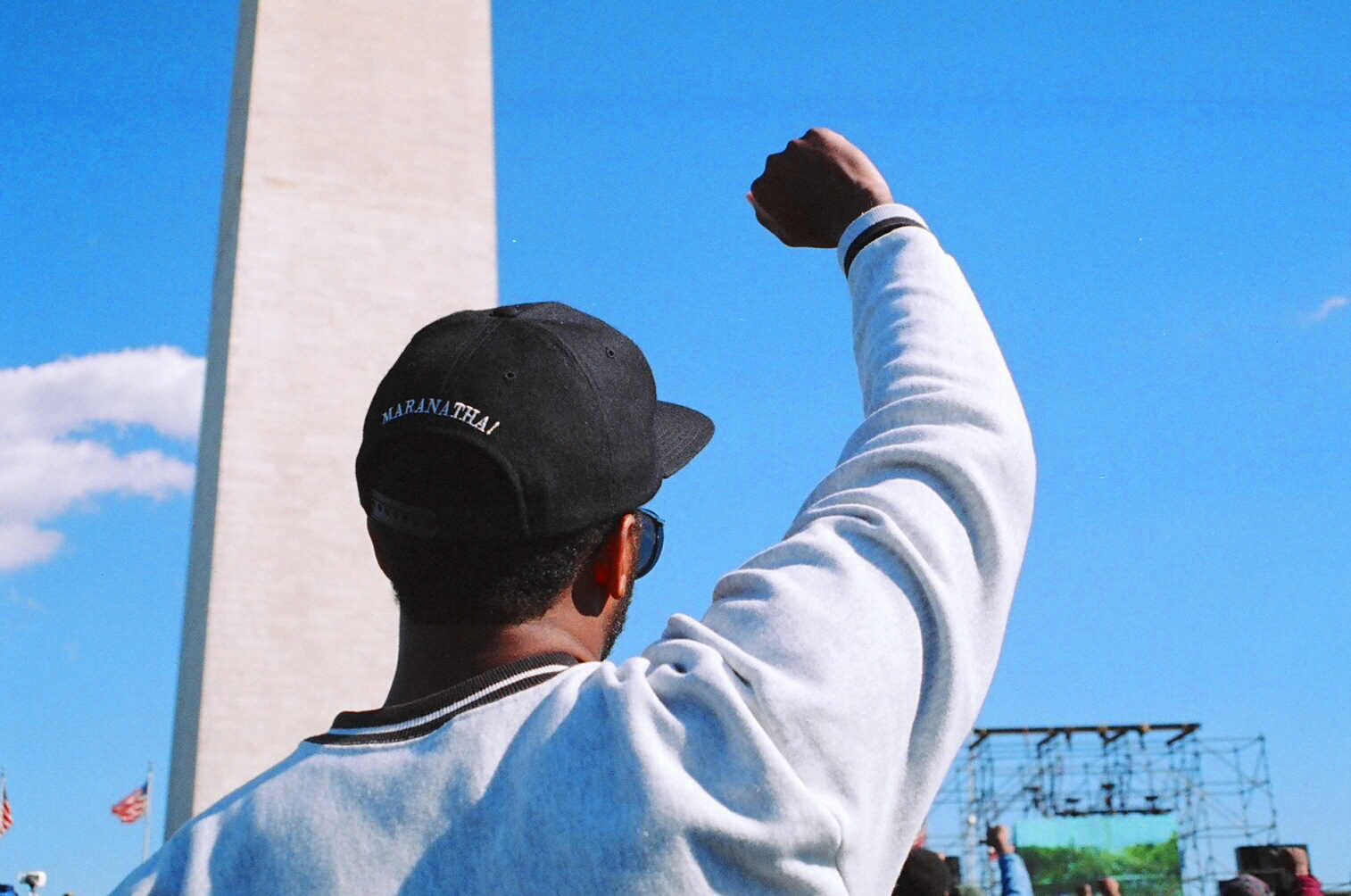
An attendant of the 1995 Million Man March raising their fist

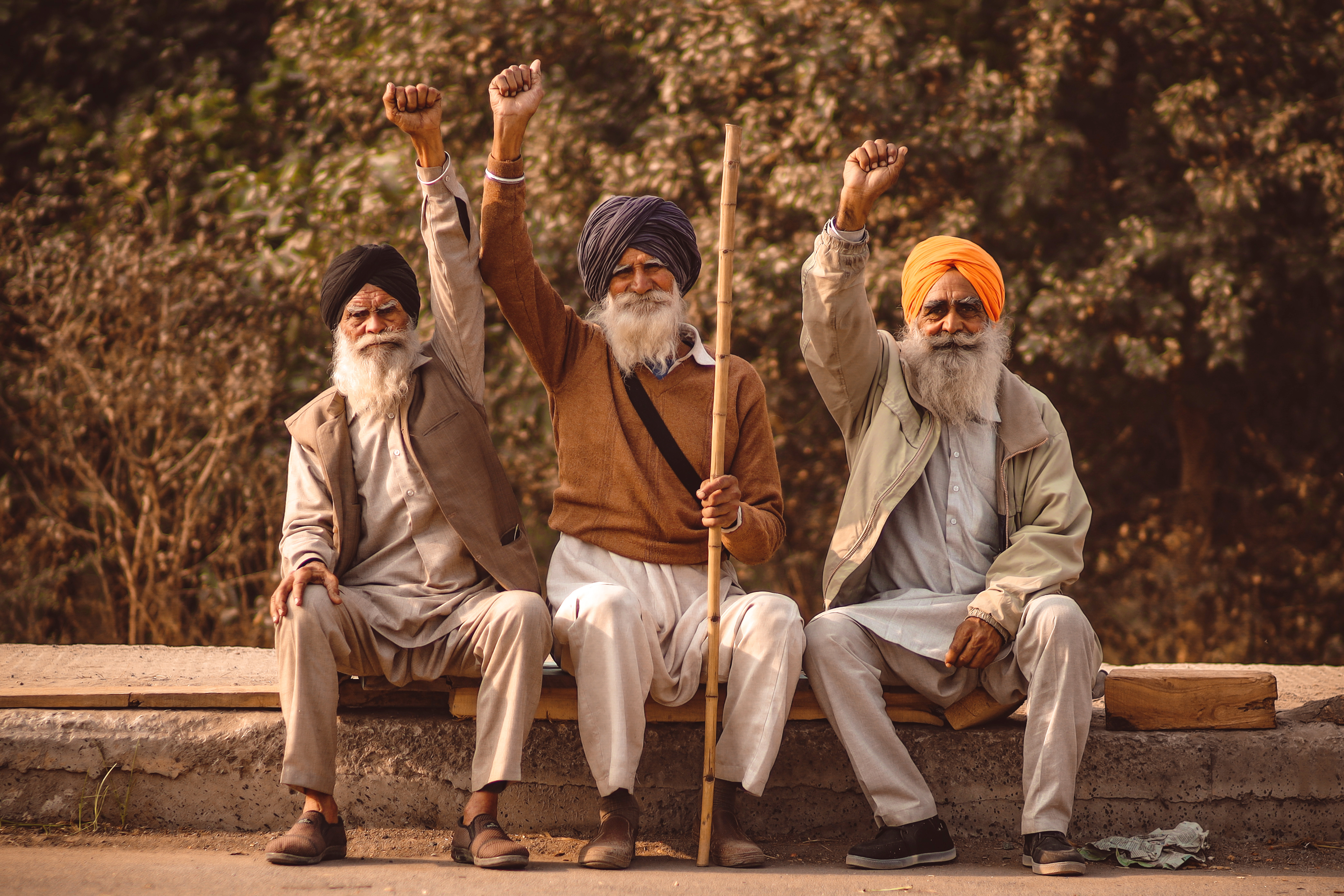
Indian farmers raising their fists as part of the farmers' protests

The raised fist, or the clenched fist, is a long-standing image of mixed meaning, often a symbol of solidarity, especially with a political movement. It is a common symbol representing a wide range of political ideologies, most notably socialism, communism, anarchism, and trade unionism, and can also be used as a salute expressing unity, strength, or resistance.

== History ==
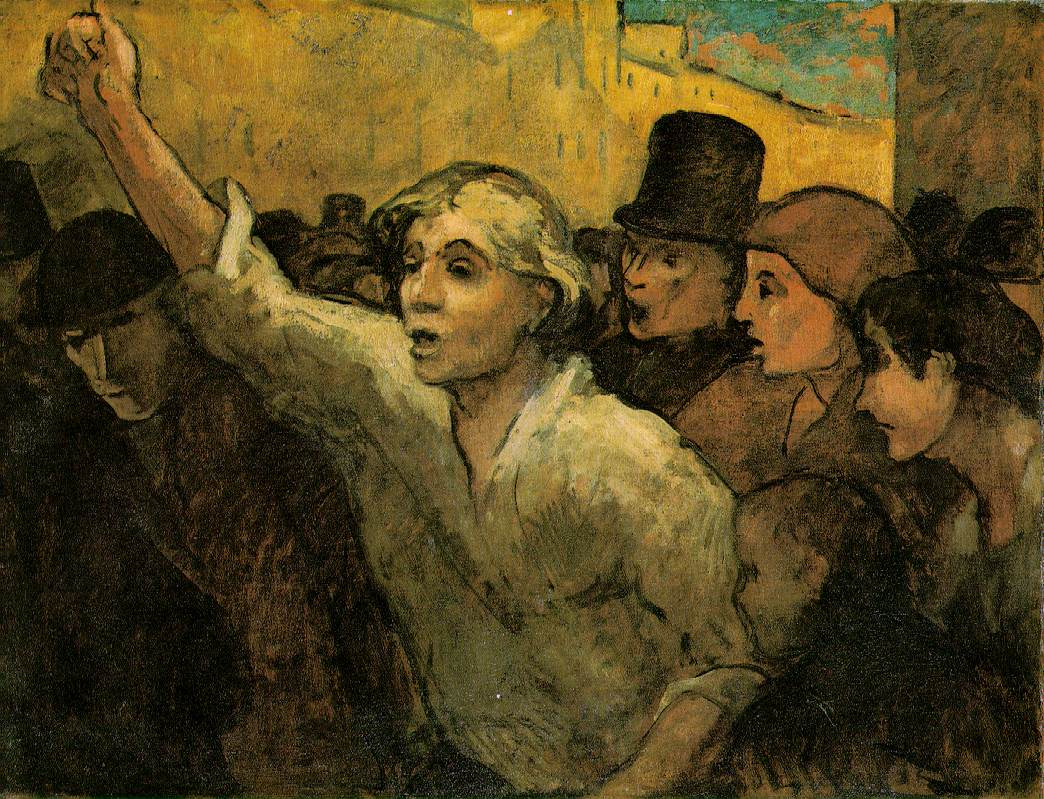
This painting by Honoré Daumier of the French Revolution of 1848 includes a possible early example of a "political clenched fist", according to curator Francesca Seravalle.

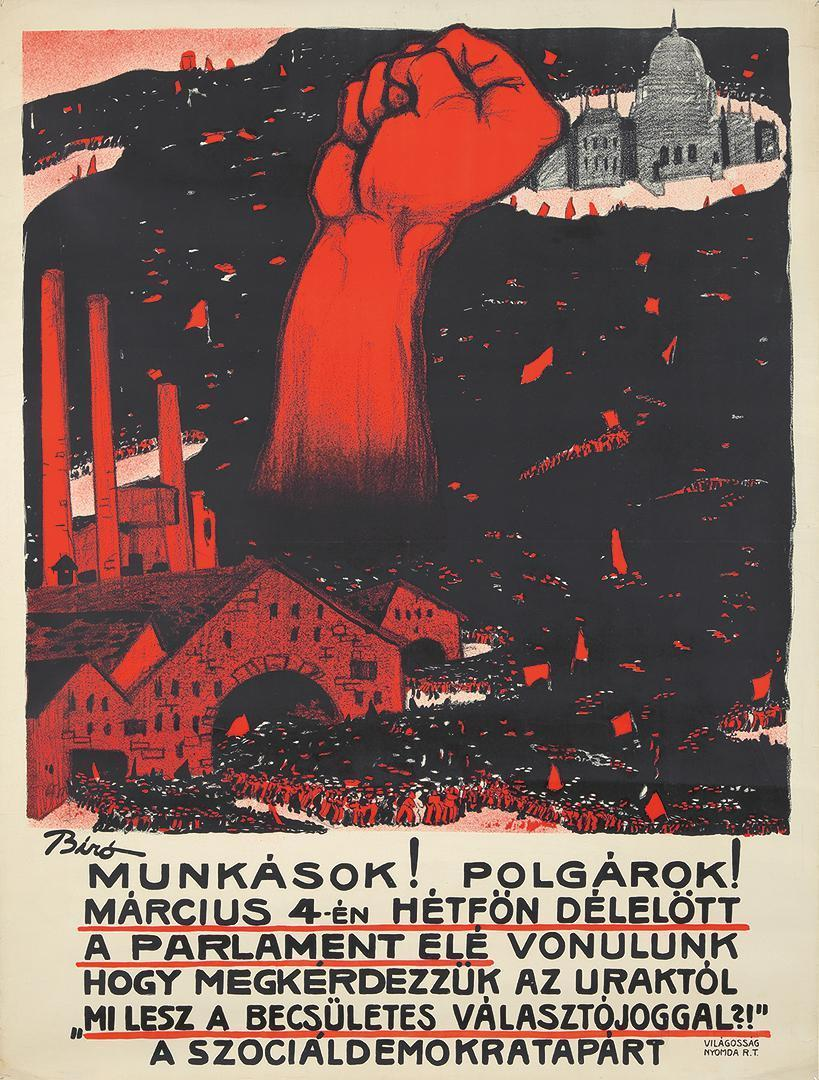
This 1912 poster by Mihály Bíró uses the fist as a symbol of the collective power of the massed workers from whom it rises.

The origin of the raised fist as either a symbol or gesture is unclear. Its use in trade unionism, anarchism, and the labor movement had begun by the 1910s. William "Big Bill" Haywood, a founding member of the Industrial Workers of the World, used the metaphor of a fist as something greater than the sum of its parts during a speech at the 1913 Paterson silk strike. Journalist and socialist activist John Reed described hearing a similar description from a participant in the strike. A large raised fist rising from a crowd of striking workers was used to promote a mass strike in Budapest in 1912. In the United States, clenched fist was described by the magazine Mother Earth as "symbolical of the social revolution" in 1914.

The use of the fist as a salute by communists and antifascists is first evidenced in 1924, when it was adopted for the Communist Party of Germany's Roter Frontkämpferbund ("Alliance of Red Front-Fighters"). In reaction, the Nazi Party adopted the well-known Roman salute two years later. The Social Democratic Party of Germany's Iron Front adopted the greeting of "freedom" and the raised fist to counter the Roman salute. The gesture of the raised fist was apparently known in the United States as well, and is seen in a photograph from a May Day march in New York City in 1936. It is perhaps best known in this era from its use during the Spanish Civil War of 1936–1939, as a greeting by the Republican faction, and known as the "Popular Front salute" or the "anti-fascist salute".

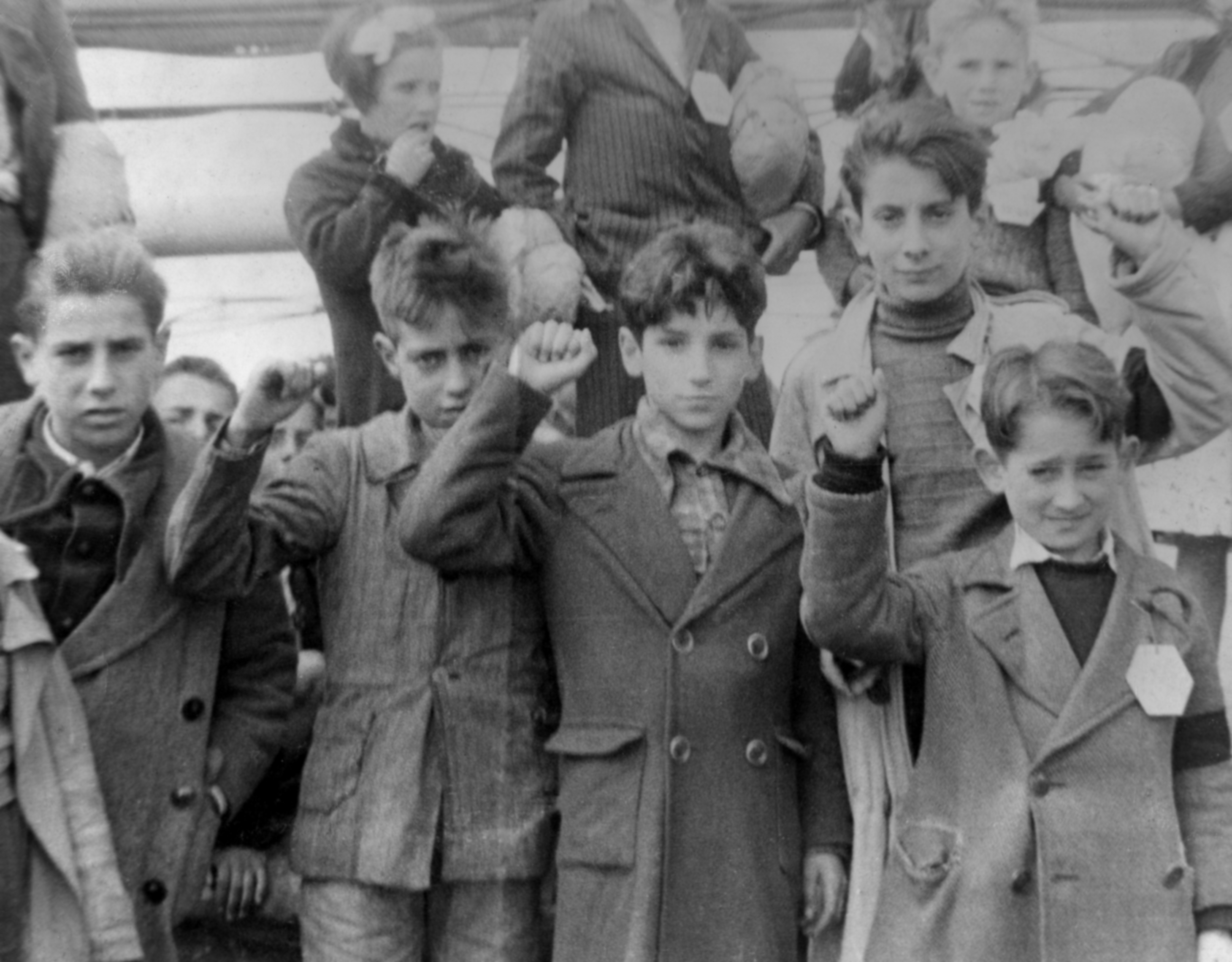
Children preparing for evacuation during the Spanish Civil War (1930s), some giving the Republican salute. The Republicans showed a raised right fist whereas the Nationalists gave the Roman salute.

The graphic symbol was popularised in 1948 by Taller de Gráfica Popular, a print shop in Mexico that used art to advance revolutionary social causes. Its use spread through the United States in the 1960s after artist and activist Frank Cieciorka produced a simplified version for the Student Nonviolent Coordinating Committee: this version was subsequently used by Students for a Democratic Society and the Black Power movement.

The raised right fist was frequently used in posters produced during the May 1968 revolt in France, such as La Lutte continue, depicting a factory chimney topped with a clenched fist.

The South African Students' Organization used the clenched and raised black fist as its logo, and the image became a symbol for the Black Consciousness Movement. Anti-apartheid activist Steve Biko's coffin also featured the image.

Robin Morgan designed the feminist symbol of a raised fist within the Venus symbol for a protest of the 1969 Miss America pageant, where it was popularized.

A raised fist incorporating the outline of the state of Wisconsin, as designed in 2011, is meant for union protests against the state rescinding collective bargaining.

== Logo ==
The raised fist logo generally carries the same symbolism as a hand gesture. It was an important symbol of workers rights and labor movements, as well as specific labor actions, such as strikes, boycotts, and walk-outs.

Notable examples include the fist and rose, a white fist holding a red rose, used by the Socialist International and some socialist or social democratic parties, such as the French Socialist Party and the Spanish Socialist Workers' Party. The fist can represent ethnic solidarity, such as in the Black Power fist of Black nationalism and the Black Panther Party, a Black Marxist group in the 1960s, or the White Power fist of White nationalism. A Black fist logo was also adopted by the northern soul music subculture. Loyalists in Northern Ireland occasionally use a red clenched fist on murals depicting the Red Hand of Ulster, which is also featured on the flag of Ulster. Irish republicans, on the other hand, have been seen displaying raised fists.

The image gallery shows how a raised fist is used in visual communication. Combined with another graphic element, a raised fist is used to convey polysemous gestures and opposing forces. Depending on the elements combined, the meaning of the gesture changes in tone and intention. For example, a hammer and sickle combined with a raised right fist is part of communist symbolism, while the same right fist combined with a Venus symbol represents feminism, and combined with a book, it represents some librarians who oppose digital rights management. The Gonzo fist emblem, characterized by two thumbs and four fingers holding a peyote button, was originally used in Hunter S. Thompson's 1970 campaign for sheriff of Aspen, Colorado. It has become a symbol of Thompson and gonzo journalism as a whole.

The Unicode character for the raised fist is U+270A ✊ RAISED FIST.

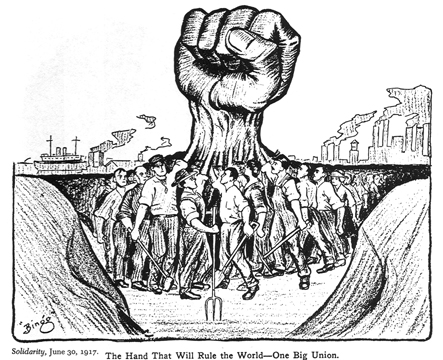
Solidarity cartoon 1917

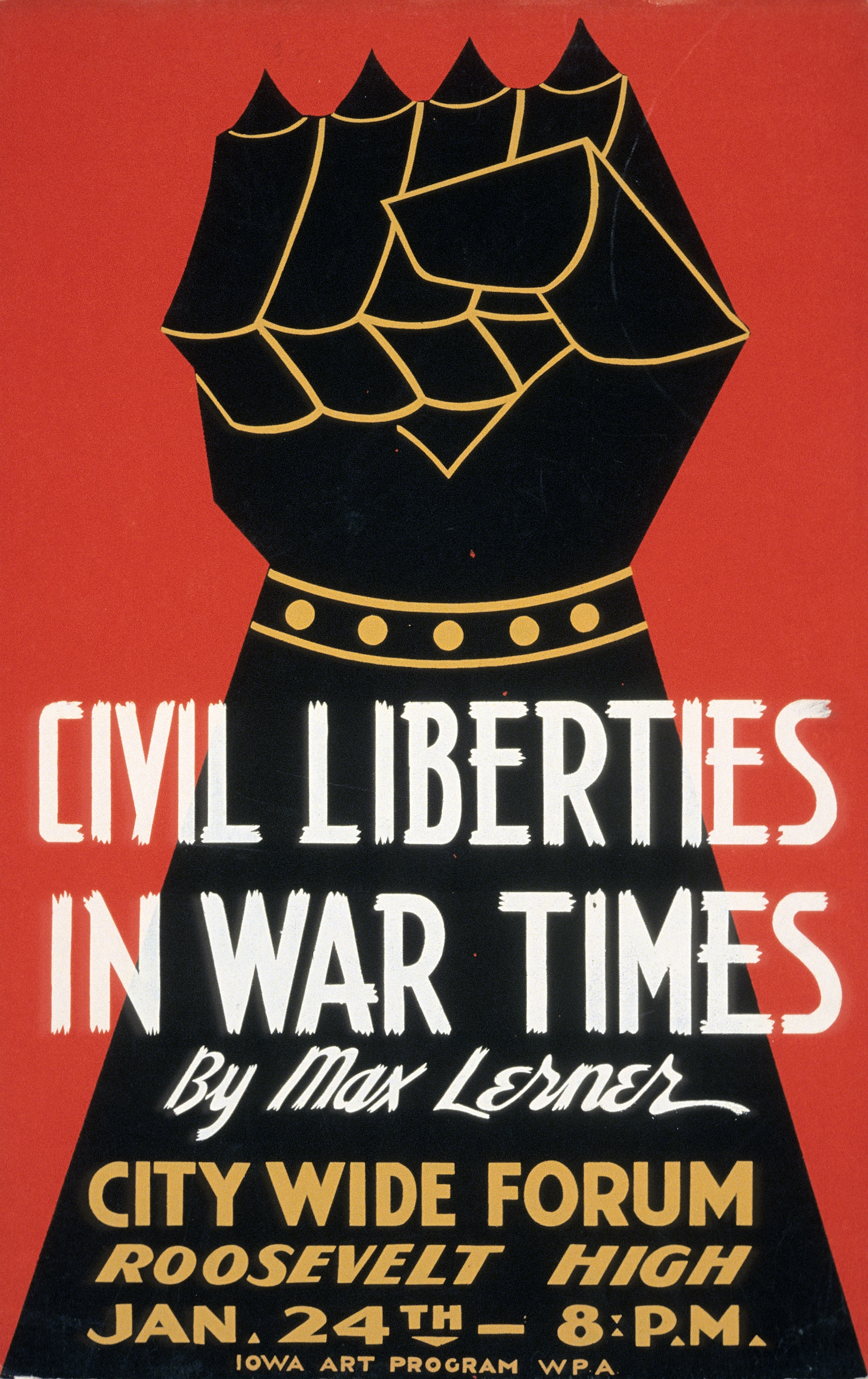
Civil liberties poster 1940

Painted symbol of the Power Fist

Fist and rose

Feminism

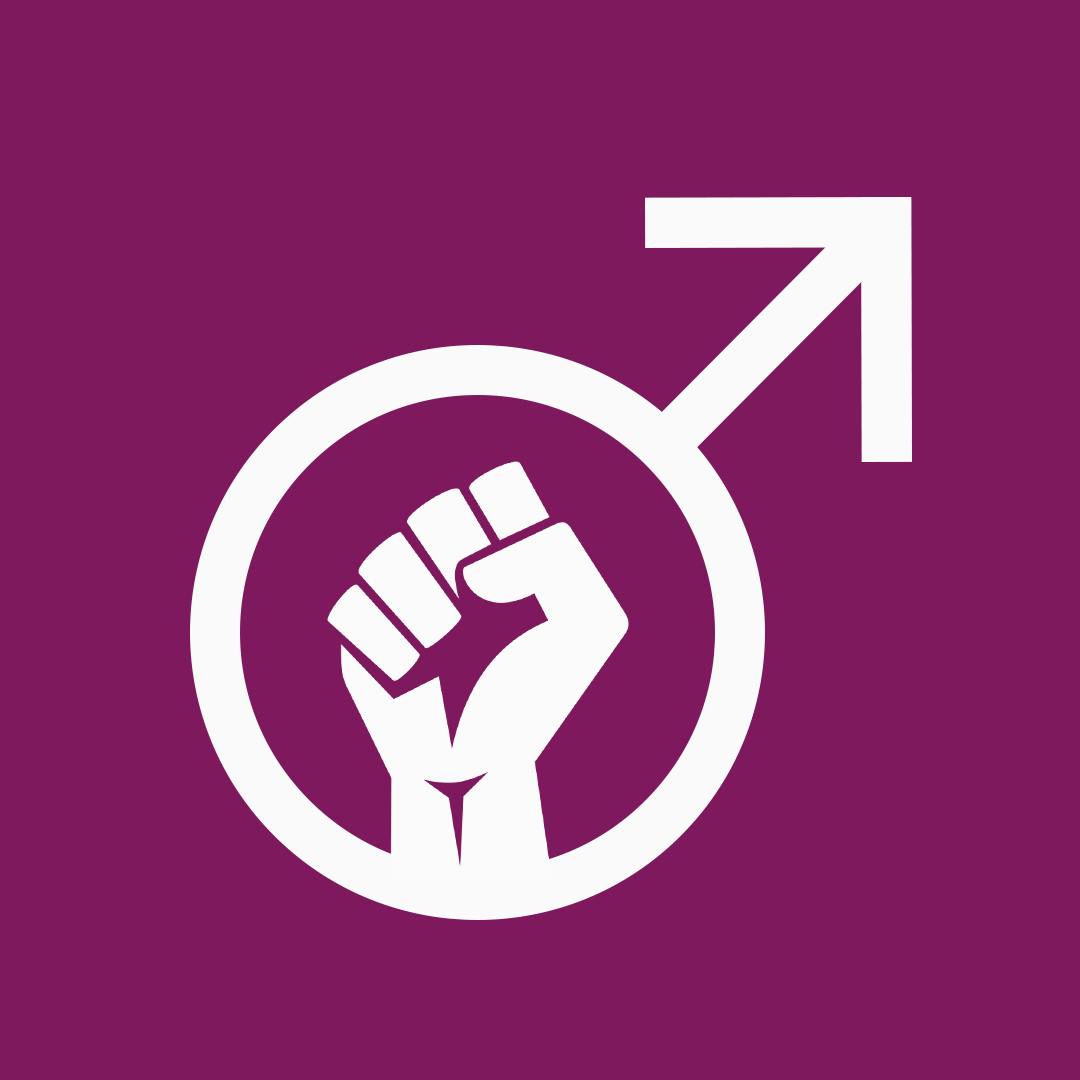
Masculism

The "Gonzo fist"

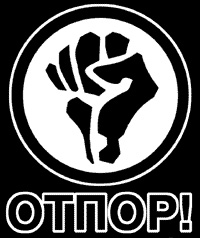
Otpor!

Kach and Kahane Chai

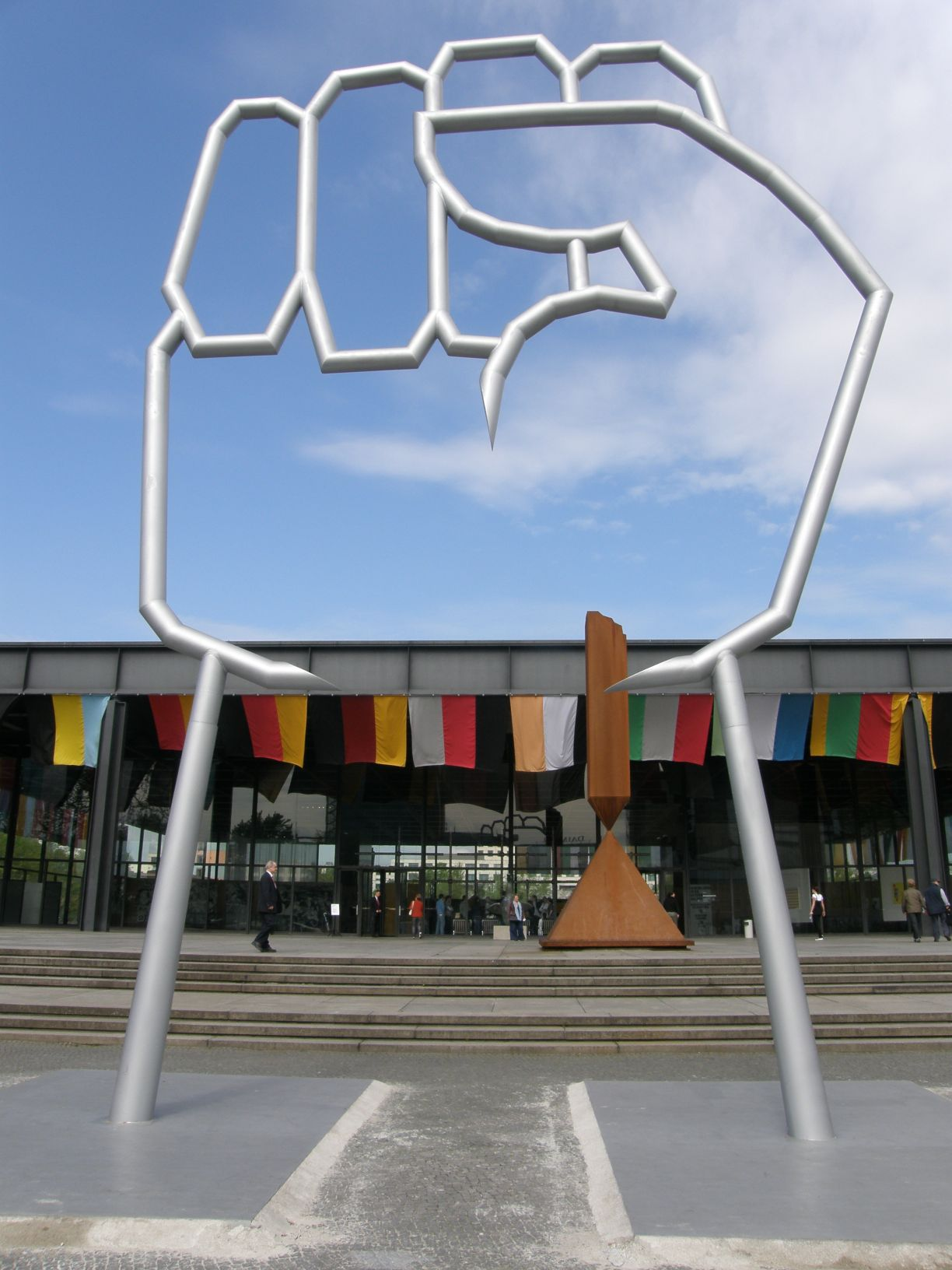
Piotr Uklański, Untitled (Fist) 2008

Librarians Against DRM

White power fist, used by white nationalists and white supremacists, popularised by the band Skrewdriver

== Salute ==
Different movements sometimes use different terms to describe the raised fist salute: amongst communists and socialists, raised right fist is sometimes called the red salute, whereas in the United States it is widely known as the Black Power salute due to use by many African-American activists. The Rotfrontkämpferbund paramilitary organization of Communist Party of Germany used the right hand fist salute as early as 1924. By this time, the Soviet Union had already established the use of a traditional Russian military salute. During the Spanish Civil War, it was sometimes known as the anti-fascist salute. A letter from the Spanish Civil War stated: "...the raised fist which greets you in Salud is not just a gesture—it means life and liberty being fought for and a greeting of solidarity with the democratic peoples of the world."

At the 1968 Summer Olympics in Mexico City, medal winners John Carlos and Tommie Smith gave the raised fist salute during the American national anthem as a sign of black power, and as a protest on behalf of the Olympic Project for Human Rights. They were banned from further Olympic activities by the IOC, as the rules then in place prohibited any political statements at the Olympics. The event was one of the most overtly political statements in the history of the modern Olympic Games. Tommie Smith stated in his autobiography, "Silent Gesture", that the salute was not a Black Power salute, but in fact a human rights salute.

Nelson Mandela also used the clenched right fist salute upon his release from Victor Verster Prison in 1990.

The raised right fist is used by officials in People's Republic of China when being sworn into office.

Psychologist Oliver James has suggested that the appeal of the salute is that it allows the individual to indicate that they "intend to meet malevolent, massive institutional force with force of (their) own", and that they are bound in struggle with others against common oppression.

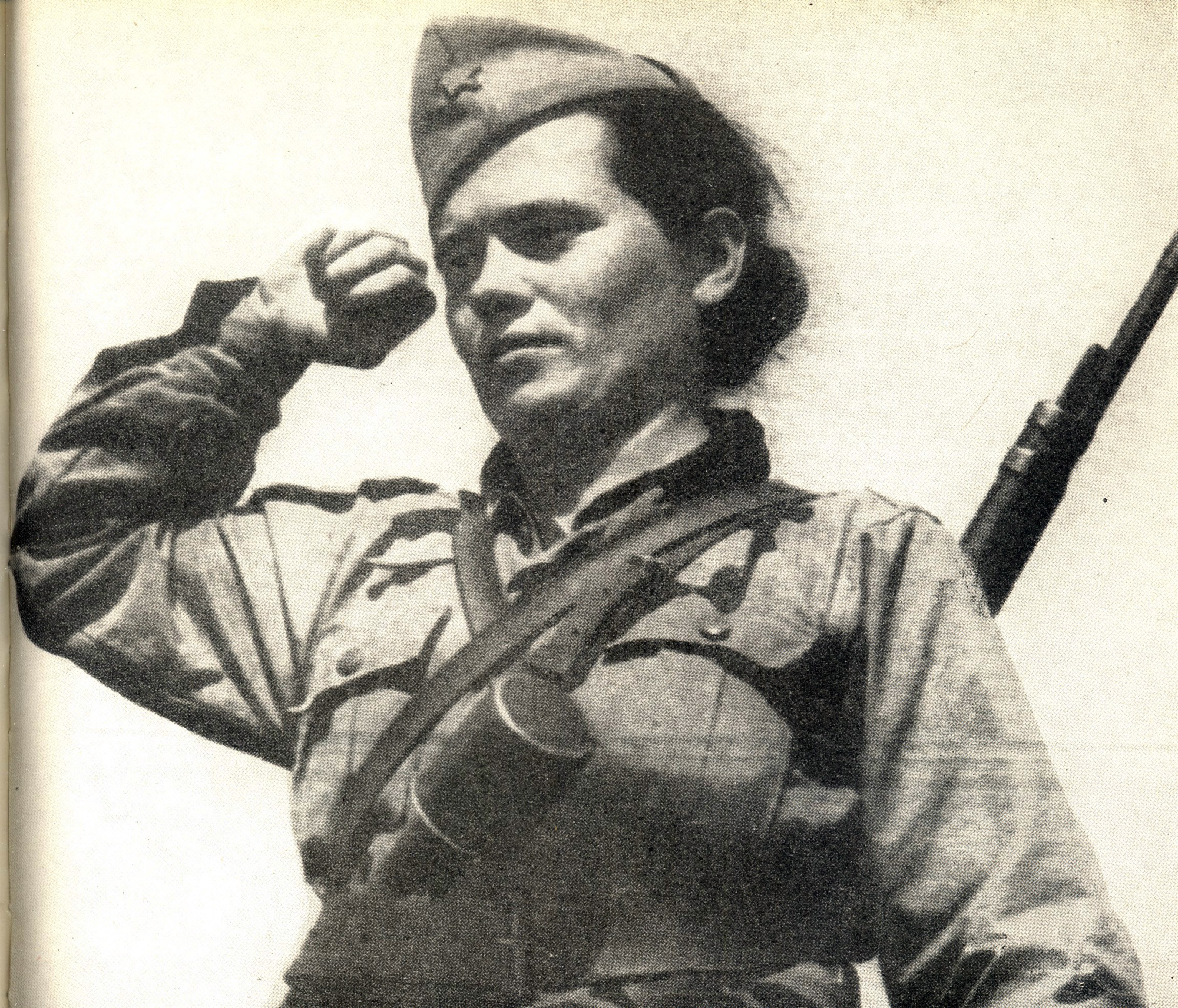
The raised fist was the official salute of communist partisan armies throughout the Balkans during World War II, as performed by this Yugoslav partisan.

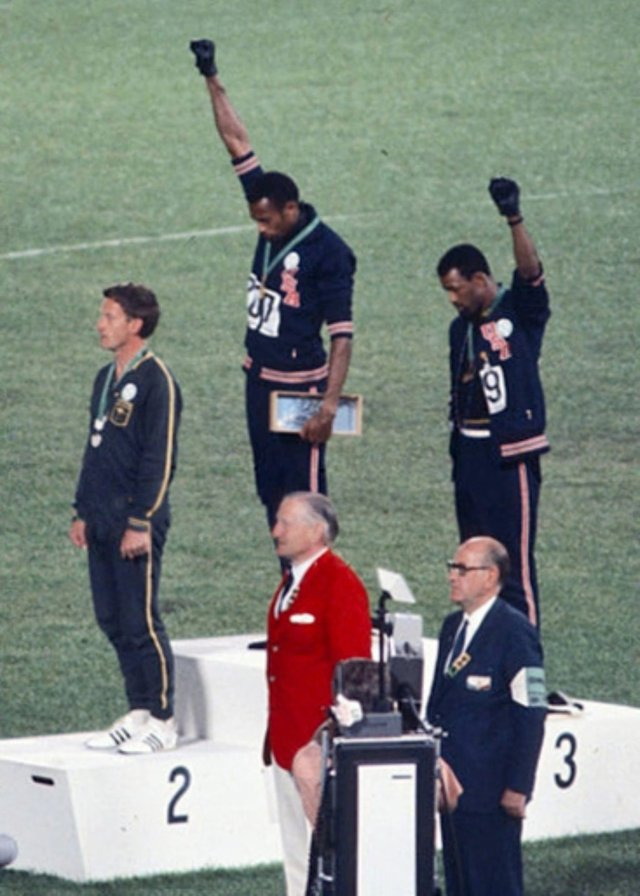
Gold medalist Tommie Smith (center) and bronze medalist John Carlos (right) showing the raised fist on the podium after the 200 m race at the 1968 Summer Olympics

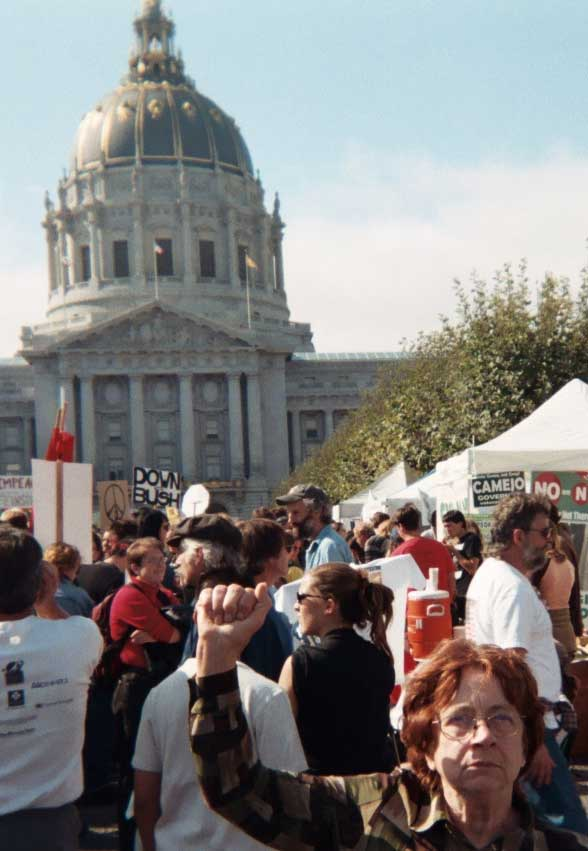
February 15, 2003: A woman raises her right fist in solidarity with protestors opposing the 2003 invasion of Iraq.

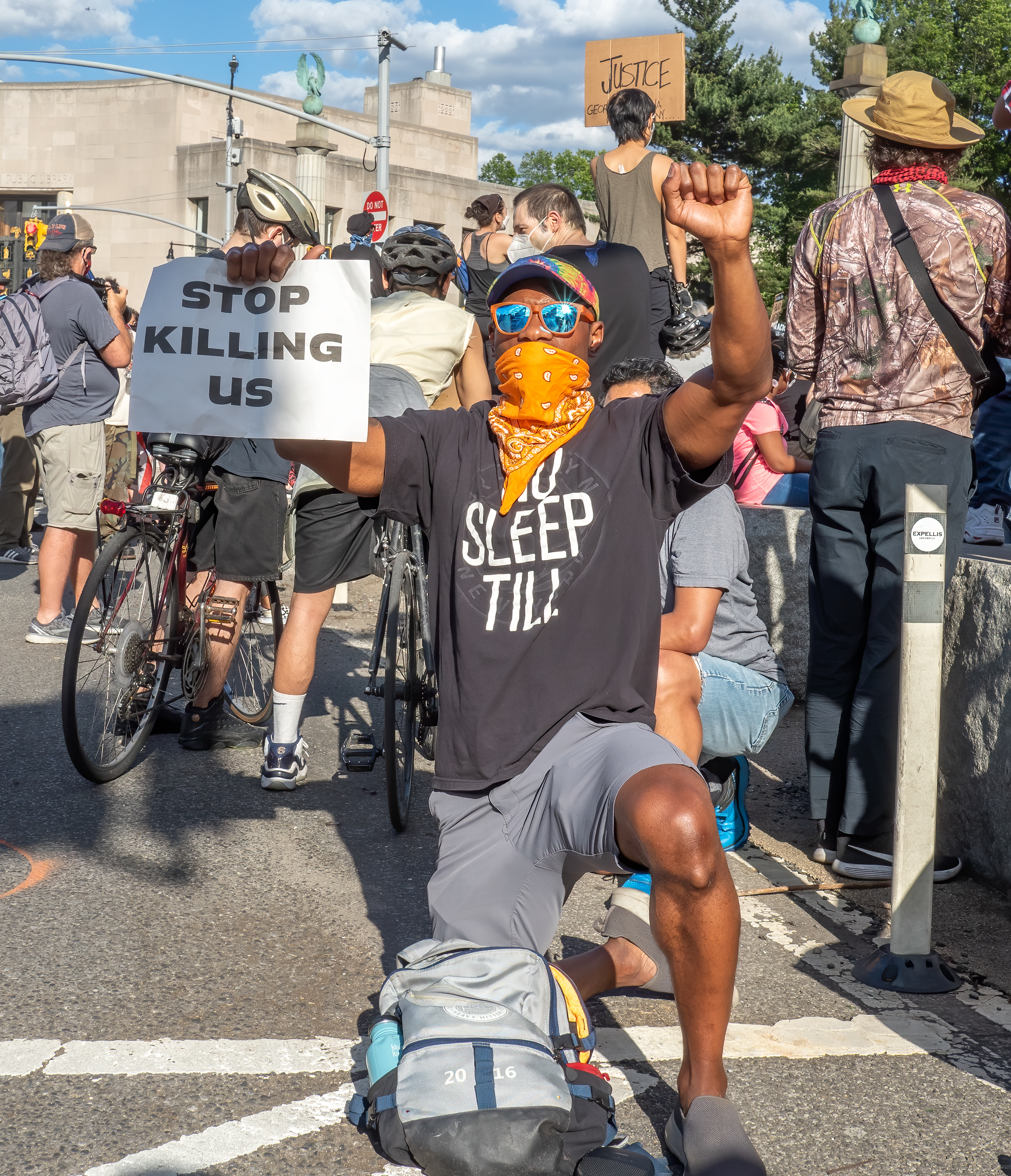
George Floyd protest, 2020

== See also ==
- 1968 Olympics Black Power salute
- 1972 Olympics Black Power salute
- Black Lives Matter
- Bras d'honneur
- Civil disobedience
- Donald Trump raised-fist photographs
- Roman salute
- Fist and rose
- "Hands up, don't shoot"
- Lal Salam
- Taking the knee
