= 1968 Olympics Black Power salute =

Protest during 1968 Olympic Games

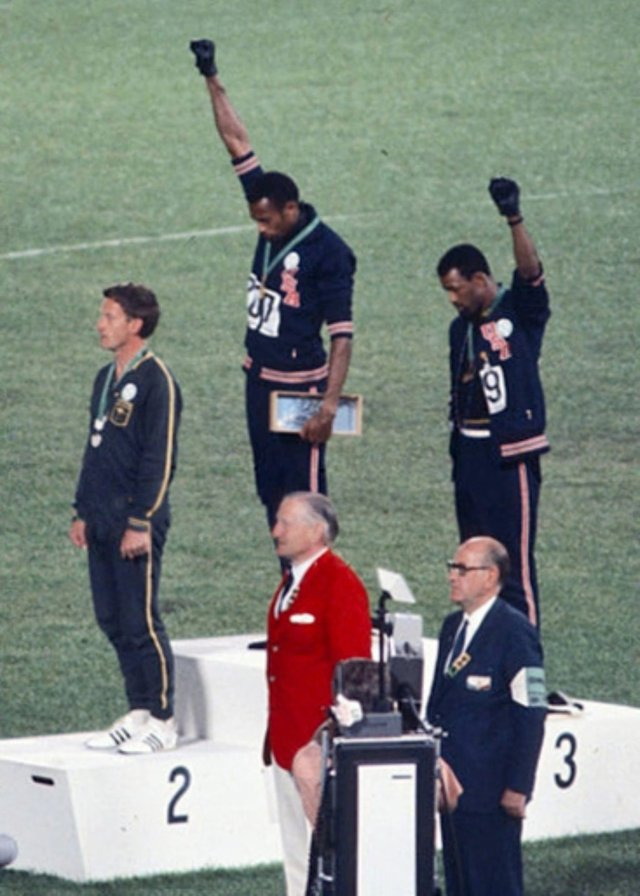
Gold medalist Tommie Smith (center) and bronze medalist John Carlos (right) showing the raised fist on the podium after the 200 m race at the 1968 Summer Olympics; both wear Olympic Project for Human Rights badges. Peter Norman (silver medalist, left) from Australia also wears an OPHR badge in solidarity with Smith and Carlos.

During their medal ceremony in the Olympic Stadium in Mexico City on October 16, 1968, two African-American athletes, Tommie Smith and John Carlos, each raised a black-gloved fist during the playing of the US national anthem, "The Star-Spangled Banner". While on the podium, Smith and Carlos, who had won gold and bronze medals respectively in the 200-meter running event of the 1968 Summer Olympics, turned to face the US flag and then kept their hands raised until the anthem had finished. In addition, Smith, Carlos, and Australian silver medalist Peter Norman all wore human-rights badges on their jackets.

In his autobiography, Silent Gesture, published nearly 30 years later, Smith declared that his gesture was not a "Black Power" salute, but rather a "human rights" salute. The demonstration has been called one of the most overtly political statements in the history of the modern Olympics.

== Protest ==
On the morning of October 16, 1968, US athlete Tommie Smith won the 200-meter race with a world-record time of 19.83 seconds. Australia's Peter Norman finished second with a time of 20.06 seconds (an Oceania record that stood for 56 years), and the US's John Carlos finished in third place with a time of 20.10 seconds. After the race was completed, the three went to the podium for their medals to be presented by David Cecil, 6th Marquess of Exeter. The two US athletes received their medals shoeless, but wearing black socks, to represent black poverty. Smith wore a black scarf around his neck to represent black pride, Carlos had his tracksuit top unzipped to show solidarity with all blue-collar workers in the US and wore a necklace of beads which he said "were for those individuals that were lynched, or killed and that no-one said a prayer for, that were hung and tarred. It was for those thrown off the side of the boats in the Middle Passage." All three athletes wore Olympic Project for Human Rights (OPHR) badges after Norman, a critic of Australia's then White Australia Policy, expressed empathy with their ideals. Sociologist Harry Edwards, the founder of the OPHR, had urged black athletes to boycott the games; reportedly, the actions of Smith and Carlos on October 16, 1968, were inspired by Edwards' arguments.

The famous picture of the event was taken by photographer John Dominis. The salute was aired live on television, transmitted around the world by broadcast satellite and Eurovision.

Both US athletes intended to bring black gloves to the event, but Carlos forgot his, leaving them in the Olympic Village. It was Peter Norman who suggested Carlos wear Smith's left-handed glove. For this reason, Carlos raised his left hand as opposed to his right, differing from the traditional Black Power salute. When "The Star-Spangled Banner" played, Smith and Carlos delivered the salute with heads bowed, a gesture which became front-page news around the world. As they left the podium, they were booed by the crowd. Smith later said, "If I win I am an American, not a black American. But if I did something bad then they would say 'a Negro'. We are black and we are proud of being black ... Black America will understand what we did tonight."

Tommie Smith stated in later years that "We were concerned about the lack of black assistant coaches. About how Muhammad Ali got stripped of his title. About the lack of access to good housing and our kids not being able to attend the top colleges."

== International Olympic Committee response ==
International Olympic Committee (IOC) president Avery Brundage, himself an American, deemed it to be a domestic political statement unfit for the apolitical, international forum the Olympic Games were intended to be. In response to their actions, he ordered Smith and Carlos suspended from the US team and banned from the Olympic Village. When the US Olympic Committee refused, Brundage threatened to ban the entire US track team. This threat led to the expulsion of the two athletes from the Games. However, contrary to a common misconception, the IOC did not force Smith and Carlos to return their medals.

A spokesman for the IOC said Smith and Carlos's actions were "a deliberate and violent breach of the fundamental principles of the Olympic spirit." Brundage, who was president of the United States Olympic Committee in 1936, had made no objections against Nazi salutes during the Berlin Olympics. He argued that the Nazi salute, being a national salute at the time, was acceptable in a competition of nations, while the athletes' salute was not of a nation and therefore unacceptable.

Brundage had been accused of being one of the United States' most prominent Nazi sympathisers even after the outbreak of the Second World War, and his removal as president of the IOC had been one of the three stated objectives of the Olympic Project for Human Rights.

In 2013, the official IOC website stated that "Over and above winning medals, the black American athletes made names for themselves by an act of racial protest."

== Aftermath ==
Smith and Carlos were largely ostracized by the US sporting establishment and they were subject to criticism. Time magazine on October 25, 1968, wrote: "'Faster, Higher, Stronger' is the motto of the Olympic Games. 'Angrier, nastier, uglier' better describes the scene in Mexico City last week." Back home, both Smith and Carlos were subject to abuse, and they and their families received death threats. Brent Musburger, a writer for the Chicago American before rising to prominence at CBS Sports and ESPN, described Smith and Carlos as "a couple of black-skinned storm troopers" who were "ignoble," "juvenile," and "unimaginative." One of the few individuals to publicly defend the actions of Smith and Carlos was Robert D. Clark, then-president of San Jose State University, where both athletes were students.

Smith continued in athletics, playing in the NFL with the Cincinnati Bengals before becoming an assistant professor of physical education at Oberlin College. In 1995, he helped coach the US team at the World Indoor Championships at Barcelona. In 1999, he was awarded the California Black Sportsman of the Millennium Award. He is now a public speaker.

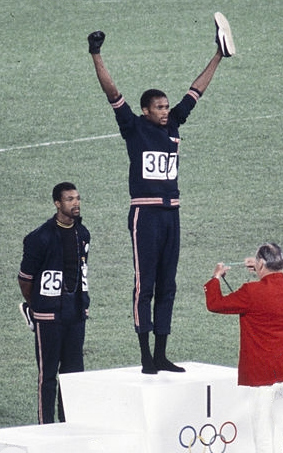
John Carlos (left) and Tommie Smith (center) wearing black gloves, black socks, and no shoes at the 200 m award ceremony of the 1968 Olympics

Carlos's career followed a similar path. He tied the 100-yard dash world record the following year. Carlos also tried professional football, and was a 15th-round selection in the 1970 NFL draft, but a knee injury curtailed his tryout with the Philadelphia Eagles. He then went on to the Canadian Football League, where he played one season for the Montreal Alouettes. He fell upon hard times in the late 1970s. In 1977, his ex-wife died by suicide, leading him to a period of depression. In 1982, Carlos worked with the Organizing Committee for the 1984 Summer Olympics in Los Angeles. In 1985, he became a track and field coach at Palm Springs High School. As of 2012, Carlos worked as a counselor at the school.

Smith and Carlos received an Arthur Ashe Courage Award at the 2008 ESPY Awards honoring their action.

Silver medalist Norman, who was sympathetic to his competitors' protest, was reprimanded by his country's Olympic authorities, and he was criticized and ostracized by conservatives in the Australian media. He was not sent to the 1972 games, despite several times making the qualifying time, though opinions differ over whether that was due to the 1968 protest. When Sydney hosted the 2000 Summer Olympics, he was not invited to take part in the celebrations in Sydney, although he played a part in announcing Australian Olympic Teams in his role as a sports administrator in Melbourne. The United States extended him an invitation to the celebrations when they learned that his own country had not done so.

When Norman died in 2006, Smith and Carlos were pallbearers at his funeral.

In 2012, the Australian House of Representatives formally passed an apology to Norman, with MP Andrew Leigh telling Parliament that Norman's gesture "was a moment of heroism and humility that advanced international awareness of racial inequality." In 2018, the Australian Olympic Committee awarded Norman posthumously the AOC Order of Merit for his involvement in the protest, with AOC President John Coates stating "we've been negligent in not recognising the role he played back then."

Wayne Collett and Vincent Matthews were banned from the Olympics after they staged a similar protest at the 1972 games in Munich.

== Documentary films ==
The 2008 Sydney Film Festival featured a documentary about the protest entitled Salute. The film was written, directed, and produced by Matt Norman, a nephew of Peter Norman.

On July 9, 2008, BBC Four broadcast a documentary, Black Power Salute, by Geoff Small, about the protest. In an article, Small noted that the athletes of the British team attending the 2008 Olympics in Beijing had been asked to sign gagging clauses which would have restricted their right to make political statements but that they had refused.

Carlos and Smith are interviewed in the 1999 documentary Fists Of Freedom.

== Play (theatre) ==
Written by the journalist Alain Coltier and staged by Gilles Champion, Mexico 68 : trois hommes, un destin (ABS éditions, 2009) started to be played in Lyon and its surroundings from June 2025.

== Tributes ==
In a 2011 speech to the University of Guelph, Akaash Maharaj, a member of the Canadian Olympic Committee and head of Canada's Olympic equestrian team, said, "In that moment, Tommie Smith, Peter Norman, and John Carlos became the living embodiments of Olympic idealism. Ever since, they have been inspirations to generations of athletes like myself, who can only aspire to their example of putting principle before personal interest. It was their misfortune to be far greater human beings than the leaders of the IOC of the day."

=== San Jose statue ===
In 2005, San Jose State University honored former students Smith and Carlos with a 22-foot-high (6.7 m) statue of their protest titled Victory Salute, created by artist Rigo 23. A student, Erik Grotz, initiated the project; "One of my professors was talking about unsung heroes and he mentioned Tommie Smith and John Carlos. He said these men had done a courageous thing to advance civil rights, and, yet, they had never been honored by their own school." The statues are located in a central part of the campus at 37.335495°N 121.882556°W, next to Robert D. Clark Hall and Tower Hall.

Those who come to view the statue are allowed to participate by standing on the monument. Peter Norman is not included in the monument so viewers can be in his place; there is a plaque in the empty spot inviting those to "Take a Stand". Norman requested that his space was left empty so visitors could stand in his place and feel what he felt. The bronze figures are shoeless but there are two shoes included at the base of the monument. The right shoe, a bronze, blue Puma, is next to Carlos; while the left shoe is placed behind Smith. The signature of the artist is on the back of Smith's shoe, and the year 2005 is on Carlos's shoe.

The faces of the statues are realistic and emotional. "The statue is made of fiberglass stretched over steel supports with an exoskeleton of ceramic tiles." Rigo 23 used 3D scanning technology and computer-assisted virtual imaging to take full-body scans of the men. Their track pants and jackets are a mosaic of dark blue ceramic tiles, while the stripes of the tracksuits are detailed in red and white.

In January 2007, History San Jose opened a new exhibit called Speed City: From Civil Rights to Black Power, covering the San Jose State athletic program "from which many student athletes became globally recognized figures as the Civil Rights and Black Power movements reshaped American society."

In 2002, San Jose State students and faculty embedded the Victory Salute statue into their Public Art as Resistance project.

=== West Oakland mural ===
A large mural depicting Smith and Carlos stood in the African-American neighborhood of West Oakland, California on an abandoned gas station shed at the corner of 12th Street and Mandela Parkway. The owner of the station wanted to pay respects to the men and constructed a mural on his private property. Above the life-sized depictions read "Born with insight, raised with a fist" (Rage Against the Machine lyrics); previously it read "It only takes a pair of gloves". In early February 2015, the former station was razed.

=== Washington, DC statue ===
The National Museum of African American History and Culture in Washington, DC, which opened in 2016, features a statue of all three athletes on the podium.

=== Sydney mural ===
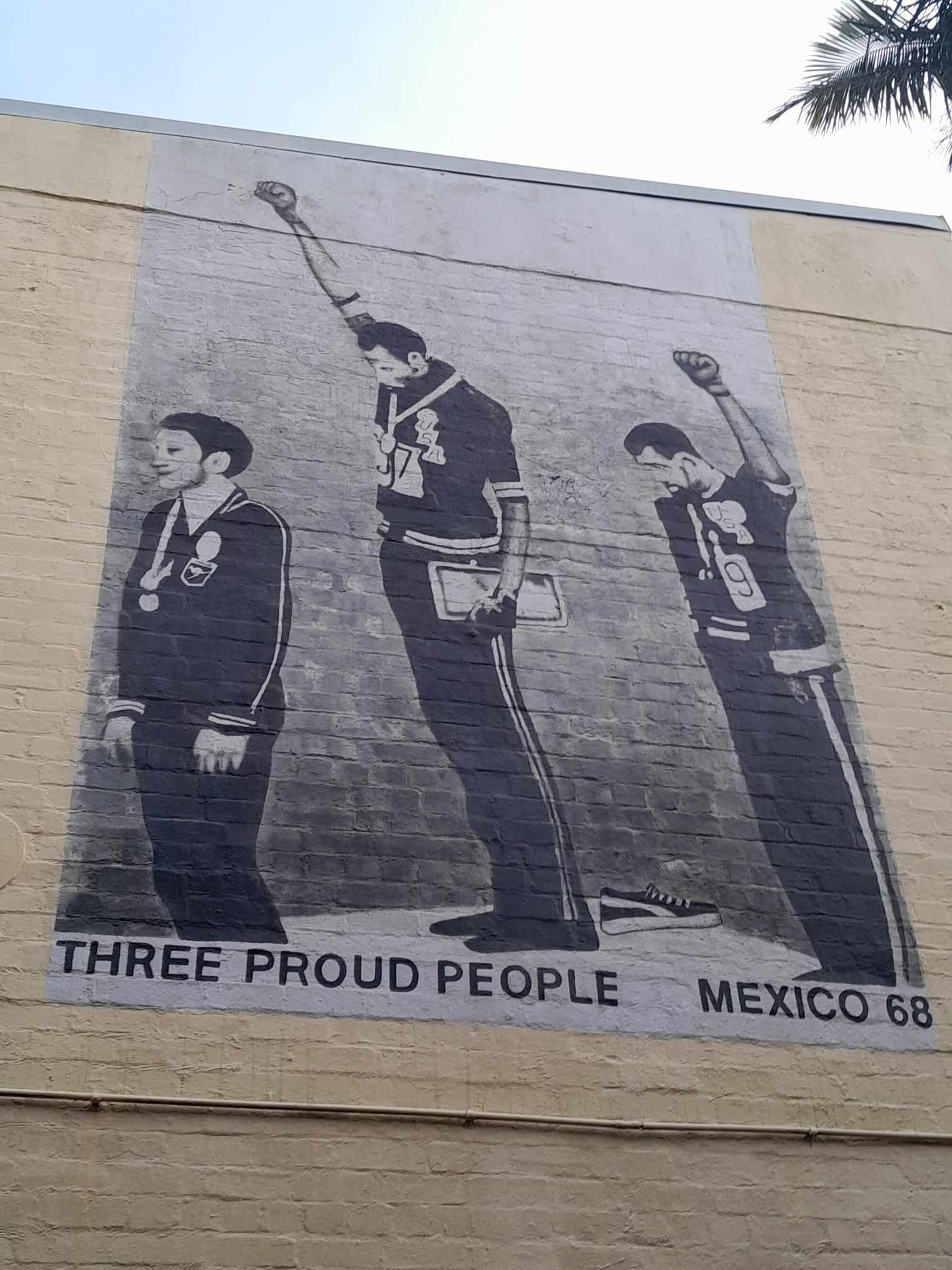
Sydney's "Three Proud People Mexico 68" mural, painted in 2000 by Donald Urquhart and restored in 2019 by Kelly Wallwork

In 2000, six weeks before the Sydney Olympics, a mural entitled "Three Proud People Mexico 68" was painted by Donald Urquhart on the side of a terrace house next to the railroad tracks in Sydney's Newtown neighbourhood, adjacent to Macdonaldtown railway station. The mural was designed to be visible to train commuters, and was for several years until a soundproof wall went up around the train lines. Today, from Macdonaldtown station, the Black Power fists are just visible protruding above the wall to keen observers. Norman visited the mural in 2006. The mural was under threat of demolition in 2010 to make way for a rail tunnel but is now listed as an item of heritage significance. It was restored by Kelly Wallwork in 2019.

=== Melbourne statue ===
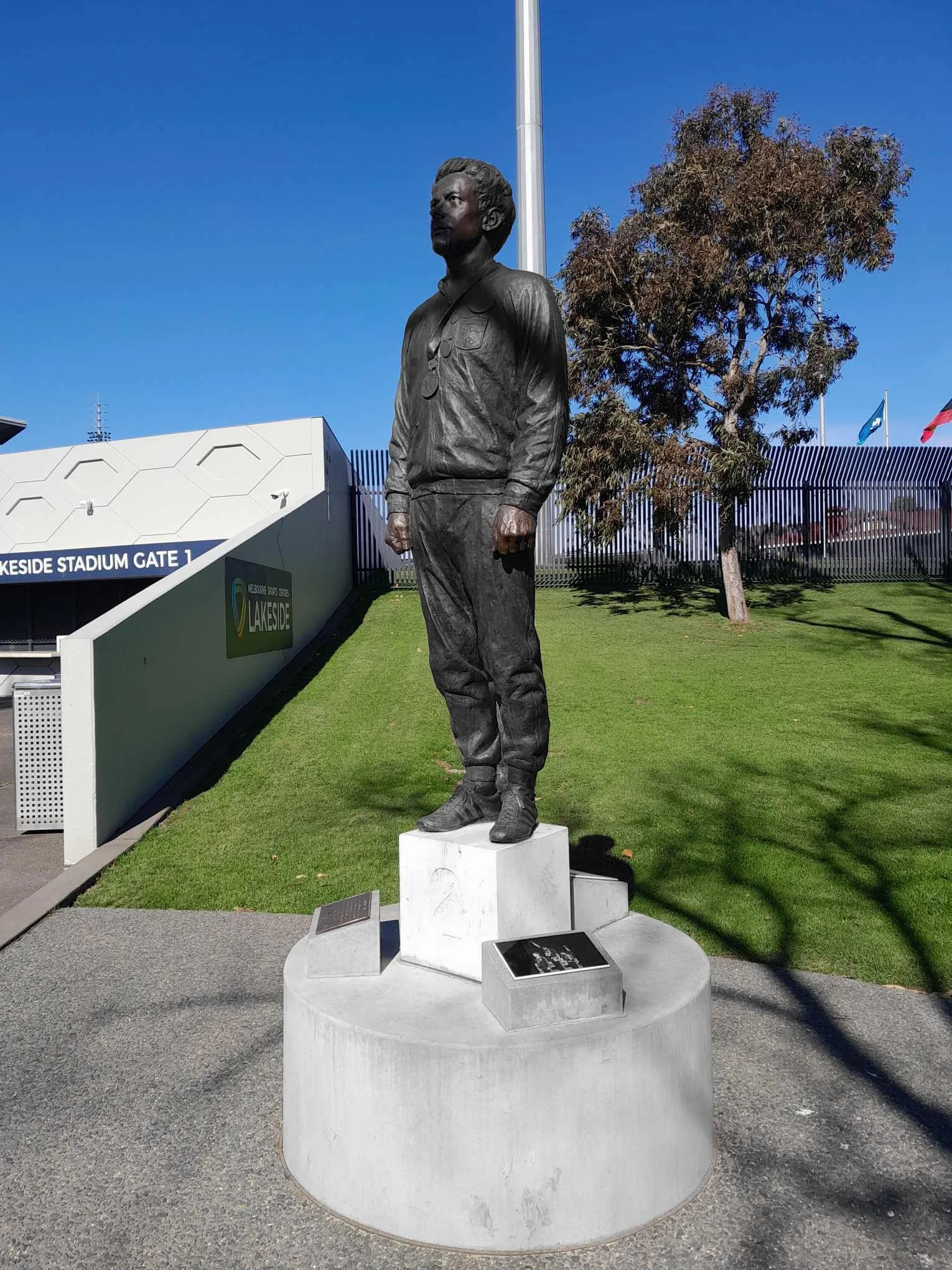
Statue of Peter Norman next to Lakeside Stadium in Albert Park, Melbourne.

In 2017, a group known as the Peter Norman Commemoration Committee began to advocate for a memorial to Norman in his hometown of Melbourne. This culminated in a statue of Norman being unveiled on October 9, 2019 (known as Peter Norman Day), at the side of Lakeside Stadium in Albert Park. The statue was designed by Louis Laumen. Indigenous Australian athlete and former politician Nova Peris called the statue "long overdue" and posed for a photo alongside it with her children, all raising their fists to replicate the original salutes.

=== References in music ===
- The song "Mr. John Carlos" by the Swedish group Nationalteatern on their 1974 album Livet är en fest is about the event and its aftermath.
- The music video for Scritti Politti's 1984 single, "Wood Beez (Pray Like Aretha Franklin)", features several direct visual references to the 1968 protest.
- Rage Against the Machine used a cropped photo of the salute on the cover art for the "Testify" single (2000). The image has both men wearing shoes.
- The cover art for the single "HiiiPoWeR" (2011) by American rapper Kendrick Lamar features a cropped photo of the salute.
- The song "Hoarse" (2013) by American rapper Earl Sweatshirt features the lines "pinnacle of titillating crispate, fists clenched, emulating '68 Olympics".
- The music video for "The Story of O.J." (2017) by American rapper Jay-Z features a depiction of the protest.
- The song "Shivers" by Peter Perrett, best known as the frontman of The Only Ones, features the lines "The torch of liberty, Tommie Smith's black glove".
- The music video for "The Space Program" (2016) by American Hip-Hop group A Tribe Called Quest features Pharrell Williams imitating the salute.

== Works ==
- October 1968 : Three Men in Mexico by Alain (Philippe) Coltier, foreword by Colin Tatz, Red Kelpies Project (2012) ISBN 9780987294005
- The John Carlos Story: The Sports Moment That Changed the World, by John Carlos and Dave Zirin, Haymarket Books (2011) ISBN 978-1-60846-127-1
- Three Proud People (2000) [Mural]. 39 Pine Street Newtown NSW Australia.

== See also ==
- 1972 Olympics Black Power salute
- List of photographs considered the most important
- List of Olympic Games scandals and controversies
- Doug Roby
- Kozakiewicz's gesture
- Jesse Owens
- Colin Kaepernick
- Raven Saunders
- U.S. national anthem protests
