= Vincent Matthews (athlete) =

American sprinter

Vince Matthews
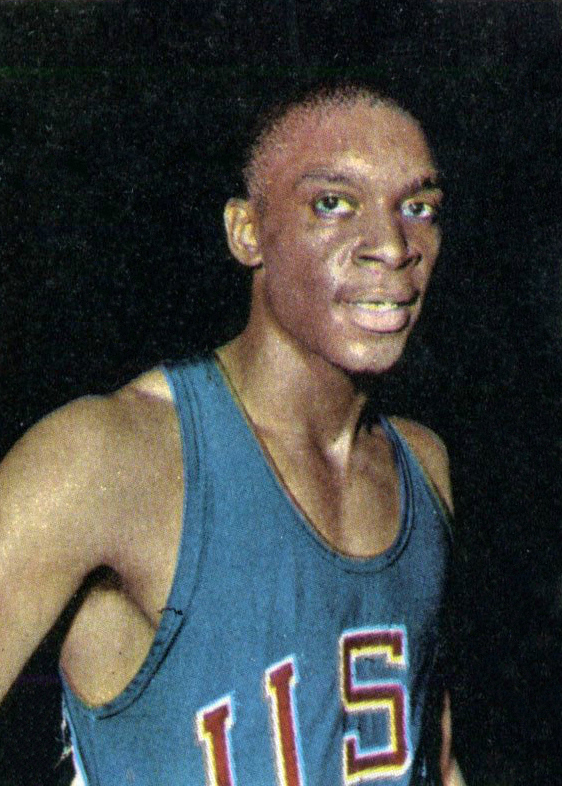

Personal information
- Born: December 16, 1947 (age 78) Queens, New York, United States
- Height: 1.87 m (6 ft 2 in)
- Weight: 81 kg (179 lb)

Sport
- Sport: Athletics
- Events: 200 m, 400 m
- Club: BOHAA Club

Achievements and titles
- Personal bests: 200 m – 20.7 (1972); 400 m – 44.66 (1972)
Medal record
Representing the United States
Olympic Games
Gold medal – first place	1968 Mexico City	4 × 400 m relay
Gold medal – first place	1972 Munich	400 m
Pan American Games
Gold medal – first place	1967 Winnipeg	4 × 400 m relay
Silver medal – second place	1967 Winnipeg	400 m

Vincent "Vince" Edward Matthews (born December 16, 1947) is an American former sprinter, winner of two Olympic gold medals, at the 1968 Summer Olympics and 1972 Summer Olympics.

== Career ==
Matthews was one of the best African American long sprinters to appear in the mid-1960s, and developed a fierce rivalry with future Olympic champion Lee Evans. The pair first met in their teens, and then duelled several times in 1967, with Evans coming out on top in the AAU Championships and Pan American Games.

At the warm-up meet two weeks before the Olympic Trials in 1968, Matthews set the new world record 44.4 s in 400 m, but his time was rejected as a world record due to his use of PUMA's illegal "brush spikes". At the Trials themselves, he was then beaten out of the top three by Evans, Larry James and Ron Freeman.

At the 1968 Olympic Games in Mexico City, Matthews ran the first leg on the United States gold medal-winning 4 × 400 m relay team that set the world record of 2:56.16, which lasted for 20 years.

=== 1972 Olympics ===
After Mexico, Matthews gave up track and field for a year as he struggled with the demands of work and marriage, but worked his way back to full fitness and into contention for the 1972 Olympic Games in Munich. At the 400 m Olympic Trials, Matthews finished third behind John Smith and Wayne Collett, beating old rival Lee Evans into fourth. In the Olympic final, Smith took the early lead but dropped out due to a hamstring injury after 80 meters. The race turned into a battle between Matthews and Collett, with Matthews winning in 44.66 s and Collett coming second in 44.80 s.

The triumph was tarnished by the events during the medal ceremony, where they were talking to each other and fidgeting while the US national anthem played, leading many to believe it was a Black Power protest like that of Tommie Smith and John Carlos in 1968.

The Associated Press noted that the casual behavior of Matthews and Collett during the playing of the anthem was "disrespectful," and described the conduct as follows:

Collett, bare-footed, leaped from the No. 2 tier to the No. 1 stand beside his teammate. They stood sideways to the flag, twirling their medals, with Matthews stroking his chin. Their shoulders slumped, neither stood erect nor looked at the flag. ... As whistles and catcalls continued, Collett raised a clenched fist to the crowd before entering the portal of the dressing room.

Robert Markus reported in the Chicago Tribune on September 9, 1972

[Matthews] was angry at Coach Bill Bowerman-as most of the U.S. trackmen seem to be-because Bowerman had hinted he would like to remove him from the place he had earned in the 400-meter field. He was angry that he had been forced to train on his own in unsuitable facilities, had to travel 4 or 5 times from N.Y. to the west coast in order to get any kind of competition, and had been put down by some of the press as a drag on America's hopes for a 400-meter sweep.

The Chicago Tribune reported

Matthews said his and Collett's actions were directed at the U.S. coaching staff, not the flag or the National Anthem. "We were just mad about a lot of things. We didn't think it would blow up like this. We were asked to apologize. I'm not really sorry for what I did. I'm sorry for the way people took it [hoots and whistles from the stands when the anthem finished]. What I tried to get across to the Olympic Committee was if it was pre-meditated I could have done something better than that. It was just something that happened. We didn't realize the implications to the people in the stands.

However, in an interview after the medal ceremony with the American Broadcasting Company, Collett said the national anthem meant nothing to him. He explained that he had felt unable to honor the anthem because of the struggle faced by African Americans at the time: "I couldn't stand there and sing the words because I don't believe they're true. I wish they were. I believe we have the potential to have a beautiful country, but I don't think we do."

The two were banned from future Olympic competition by the IOC. Since John Smith had pulled a hamstring 80 meters into the 400 m final while leading and had been ruled unfit to run, the USA were missing three runners and were unable to field a team in the 4 × 400 m relay and were forced to scratch from the event.

On the March 1973 cover of Track and Field News Matthews and Collett are pictured from the award stand promoting an article "All Gold Does Not Glitter."

== Personal life ==
Matthews is also an artist - burning images onto wood panels - with works on display with the Art of the Olympians.
