= Wayne Collett =

American sprinter

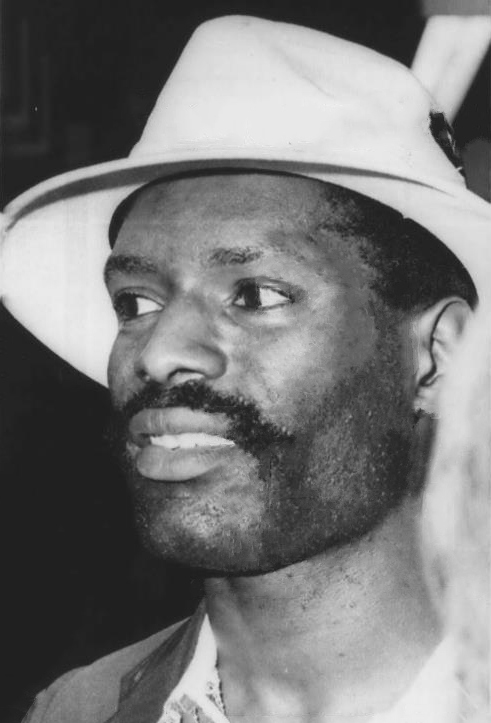
- Collett in 1972

Personal information
- Born: October 20, 1949 Los Angeles, U.S.
- Died: March 17, 2010 (aged 60) Los Angeles, U.S.
- Height: 188 cm (6 ft 2 in)
- Weight: 84 kg (185 lb)

Sport
- Sport: Athletics
- Events: 100–800 m, hurdles
- Club: UCLA Bruins, Los Angeles

Achievements and titles
- Personal bests: 100 yd – 9.6 (1971); 200 m – 20.2 (1968); 400 m – 44.1 (1972); 400 mH – 48.9 (1970); 880 yd – 1:52.6 (1971)
Medal record
Representing the United States
Olympic Games
| Silver medal – second place | 1972 Munich | 400 m |

Wayne Curtis Collett (October 20, 1949 – March 17, 2010) was an American Olympic sprinter. Collett won a silver medal in the 400 m at the 1972 Summer Olympics. During the medal ceremony Collett and winner Vincent Matthews talked to each other, shuffled their feet, stroked their chins and fidgeted while the US national anthem played, leading many to believe it was a Black Power protest like the 1968 Olympics Black Power salute by Tommie Smith and John Carlos.

The Associated Press noted that the casual behavior of Matthews and Collett during the playing of the anthem was interpreted as "disrespectful", and described the conduct as follows:

Collett, bare-footed, leaped from the No. 2 tier to the No. 1 stand beside his teammate. They stood sideways to the flag, twirling their medals, with Matthews stroking his chin. Their shoulders slumped, neither stood erect nor looked at the flag. ... As whistles and catcalls continued, Collett raised a clenched fist to the crowd before entering the portal of the dressing room.

In an interview after the medal ceremony with the American Broadcasting Company, Collett said the national anthem meant nothing to him. He explained that he had felt unable to honor the anthem, because of the struggle faced by African Americans at the time: "I couldn't stand there and sing the words because I don't believe they're true. I wish they were. I believe we have the potential to have a beautiful country, but I don't think we do." The pair were banned from future Olympic competition by the IOC; since John Smith had pulled a hamstring 80 meters into the final while leading and had been ruled unfit to run, the USA were missing three runners and were unable to field a team in the 4 × 400 m relay and were forced to scratch from the event.

While still on the rise as an athlete, Collett was pictured on the March 1970 cover of Track and Field News as a hurdler. On the March 1973 cover, he and Mathews are pictured from the award stand promoting an article "All Gold Does Not Glitter."

Collett graduated from UCLA in 1971, where he later earned M.B.A. and J.D. degrees. He practiced law and worked in real estate and mortgage finance. In 1992 he was inducted into the UCLA Athletics Hall of Fame. He died of cancer at St. Vincent Medical Center in Los Angeles on March 17, 2010, aged 60.

Records
| Preceded by ? | Men's World Junior Record Holder, 400 metres 13 September 1968 – 24 July 1982 | Succeeded by (United States) Darrell Robinson |
