= Tommie Smith =

American track and field athlete (born 1944)

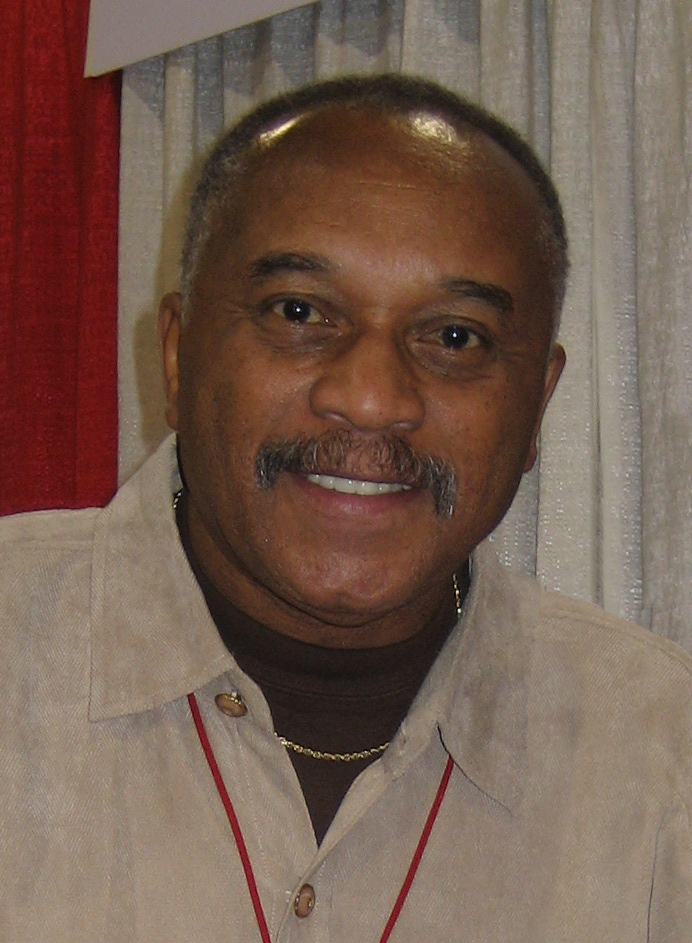
- Smith in 2009

Personal information
- Born: June 6, 1944 (age 82) Clarksville, Texas, U.S.
- Height: 6 ft 3 in (1.91 m)
- Weight: 185 lb (84 kg)
- Football career

No. 24
- Position: Wide receiver

Personal information
- Listed height: 6 ft 3 in (1.91 m)
- Listed weight: 190 lb (86 kg)

Career information
- High school: Lemoore (CA)
- College: San Jose State
- NFL draft: 1967: 9th round, 226th overall pick

Career history
- Cincinnati Bengals (1969)
- Stats at Pro Football Reference

Sport
- Sport: Track and field
- Event: Sprints
- College team: San Jose State Spartans
- Club: Santa Clara Valley Youth Village

Achievements and titles
- Personal bests: 100 m: 10.1 seconds, hand-timed (San Jose, 1966); 200 m: 19.83 (Mexico City, 1968); 400 m: 44.50 (San Jose, 1967)
Medal record
Men's athletics
Representing the United States
Olympic Games
Gold medal – first place	1968 Mexico City	200 m
Universiade
Gold medal – first place	1967 Tokyo	200 m
Silver medal – second place	1967 Tokyo	100 m

Tommie C. Smith (born June 6, 1944) is an American former track and field athlete and wide receiver in the American Football League. At the 1968 Summer Olympics, Smith, aged 24, won the 200-meter sprint finals and gold medal in 19.83 seconds – the first time the 20-second barrier was broken officially. His Black Power salute with John Carlos atop the medal podium caused controversy, as it was seen as politicizing the Olympic Games. It remains a symbolic moment in the history of the Black Power movement.

== Early life and career ==
Tommie Smith was born on June 6, 1944, in Clarksville, Texas, the seventh of twelve children born to Richard and Dora Smith. He suffered from pneumonia as a child, but still grew to be an athletic youth. While attending Lemoore High School in Lemoore, California, Smith showed great potential, setting most of the school's track records, many of which remain. He won the 440-yard dash in the 1963 CIF California State Meet. He was voted Lemoore's "Most Valuable Athlete" in basketball, football, and track and field, and was also voted vice president of his senior class. His achievements earned him a scholarship to San José State University.

On May 7, 1966, while he was at San Jose State, Smith set a world best of 19.5 seconds in the 200 m straight, which he ran on a cinder track. That record for 200 m was finally beaten by Tyson Gay on May 16, 2010, just over 44 years later, though Smith still holds the record for the slightly longer 220-yard event. Since the IAAF has abandoned ratifying records for the event, Smith still retains the official record for the straightaway 200 m/220 yards in perpetuity.

A few weeks later, on June 11, 1966, Smith set the record for 200 meters and 220 yards around a turn at 20.0, the first man to do that in 20 seconds. Six days later he won the NCAA Men's Outdoor Track and Field Championship. Smith also won the national collegiate 220-yard (201.17 m) title in 1967 before adding the AAU furlong (201.17m) crown as well. He traveled to Japan for the 1967 Summer Universiade and won the 200 m gold medal. He repeated as U.S. 200 m champion in 1968 and made the Olympic team.

== 1968 Summer Olympics ==
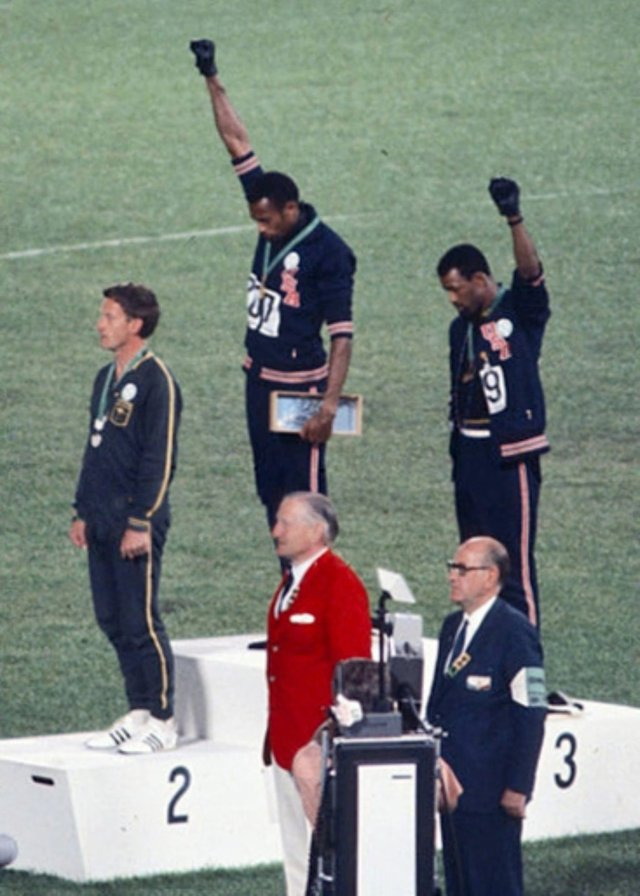
Tommie Smith (center) and John Carlos (right) showing the raised fist on the podium after the 200 m race at the 1968 Summer Olympics; both wear Olympic Project for Human Rights badges. Peter Norman (silver medalist, left) from Australia also wears an OPHR badge in solidarity with Smith and Carlos.

Leading up to the Olympics, at the U.S. Olympic Trials at Echo Summit, California, San Jose State teammate John Carlos beat Smith and his world record, running 19.92A. John Carlos' record was disallowed because of the brush spike shoes he was wearing, as was a similar record by Vince Matthews in the 400 meters.

As a member of the Olympic Project for Human Rights (OPHR) Smith originally advocated a boycott of the 1968 Olympics, the restoration of Muhammad Ali's world heavyweight boxing title, Avery Brundage to step down as president of the International Olympic Committee (IOC), and the hiring of more African-American assistant coaches. As the boycott failed to achieve support after the IOC withdrew invitations for South Africa and Rhodesia, he decided, together with Carlos, to not only wear their gloves but also go barefoot to protest poverty, wear beads to protest lynchings, and wear buttons that said OPHR.

At the 1968 Summer Olympics in Mexico, Smith nursed an injured groin into the 200 m final. In the race, teammate Carlos powered out to the lead through the turn, while Smith got a slow start. Coming off the turn, Smith charged past Carlos and sped to victory. Knowing he had passed his training partner and closest opponent, his victory was so clear, he raised his arms to celebrate 10 m before the finish line. Still, he improved upon his own world record that would last for 11 years until Pietro Mennea would surpass it on the same track. Smith's time of 19.83 was among the first automatically timed world records for the event as recorded by the IAAF.

Video on YouTube pre-Olympic trials interview anticipating potential action

Carlos and Smith made headlines around the world by raising their black-gloved fists at the medal award ceremony. Both athletes wore black socks and no shoes on the podium to represent African-American poverty. In support, Peter Norman, the silver medalist who was a white athlete from Australia, participated in the protest by wearing an OPHR badge.

IOC president Avery Brundage deemed it to be a domestic political statement unfit for the apolitical, international forum the Olympic Games were intended to be. In response to their actions, he ordered Smith and Carlos suspended from the US team and banned from the Olympic Village. When the US Olympic Committee refused, Brundage threatened to ban the entire US track team. This threat led to the expulsion of the two athletes from the Games.

A spokesman for the IOC called Smith and Carlos's actions "a deliberate and violent breach of the fundamental principles of the Olympic spirit." Brundage, who was president of the United States Olympic Committee in 1936, had made no objections against Nazi salutes during the Berlin Olympics. He argued that the Nazi salute, being a German national salute at the time, was acceptable in a competition of nations, while the athletes' salute was not of a nation and therefore unacceptable.

Smith and Carlos faced consequences for challenging white authority in the U.S. Ralph Boston, a black U.S. long jumper at the 1968 games, stated: "The rest of the world didn't seem to find it such a derogatory thing. They thought it was very positive. Only America thought it was bad." The men's gesture had lingering effects for all three athletes, the most serious of which were death threats against Smith, Carlos and their families. Following their suspension by the IOC, they faced economic hardship. Silver medalist Norman's career suffered greatly in his native Australia as "he returned home […] a pariah, suffering unofficial sanction and ridicule as the Black Power salute's forgotten man. He never ran in the Olympics again."

Smith stated in later years that "We were concerned about the lack of black assistant coaches. About how Muhammad Ali got stripped of his title. About the lack of access to good housing and our kids not being able to attend the top colleges."

== Athletics and later career ==
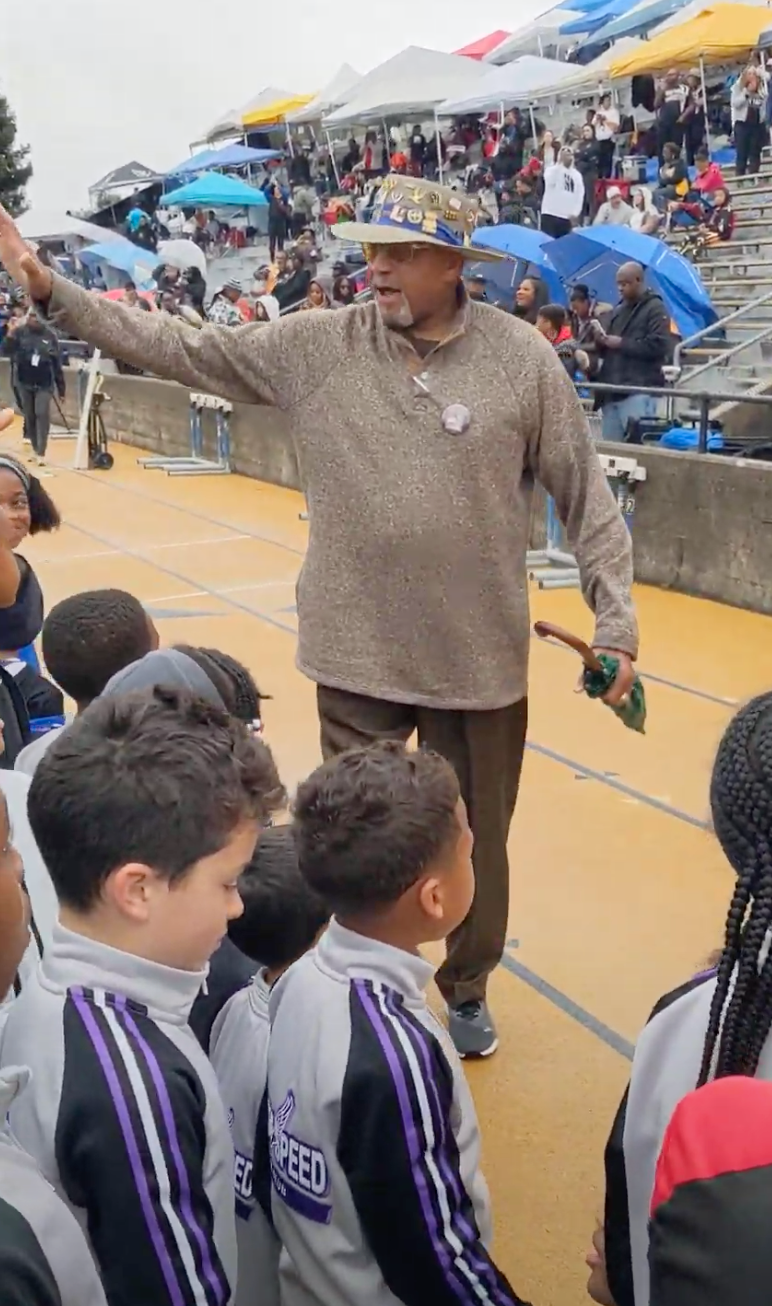
Tommie Smith leads the parade at his Youth Track Meet 2023

During his career, Smith set seven individual world records and also was a member of several world-record relay teams at San Jose State, where he was coached by Lloyd (Bud) Winter. With personal records of 10.1 for 100 meters, 19.83 for 200 and 44.5 for the 400, Smith still ranks high on the world all-time lists.

Smith, who had been drafted by the National Football League's Los Angeles Rams in the ninth round of the 1967 NFL draft, signed to play for the American Football League's Cincinnati Bengals and was part of the team's taxi squad for most of three seasons as a wide receiver. During the 1969 season, he played in two games, catching one pass for 41 yards.

A year after his Olympic win, Smith finished his BA in Social Science at San Jose State University and went on to earn a master's in Social Change from Goddard College, whose program enabled Smith to integrate his teaching and writing practices into his coursework.

After his track and football careers, he became a member of the United States National Track and Field Hall of Fame in 1978. In 1996, Smith was inducted into the California Black Sports Hall of Fame, and in 1999 he received that organization's Sportsman of the Millennium Award. In 2000 and 2001 the County of Los Angeles and the State of Texas presented Smith with commendation, recognition and proclamation awards.

He later became a track coach at Oberlin College in Ohio, where he also taught sociology and until 2005 was a faculty member teaching physical education at Santa Monica College in Santa Monica, California.

In August 2008, he gave 2008 Olympic triple gold winner Usain Bolt of Jamaica one of his shoes from the 1968 Olympics as a birthday gift.

In 2010, Smith put his gold medal and spikes up for auction. Bids started at $250,000, and the sale was scheduled to close November 4, 2010. In 2013, Goddard College honored Smith as an alumnus by awarding him the Presidential Award for Activism in 2013.

== Books ==
Smith's autobiography (co-written with David Steele), Silent Gesture was published in 2007 by Temple University Press. It was named a 2008 Adult Nonfiction Honor Book by the Black Caucus of the American Library Association and nominated for a 2008 NAACP Image Award.

Smith's second book Victory. Stand! Raising My Fist for Justice was published in 2022 by Norton Young Readers. The graphic memoir was co-written with Derrick Barnes and illustrated by Dawud Anyabwile. The book received literary acclaim. It won the 2023 YALSA Award for Excellence in Nonfiction and was recognized as a 2023 Corretta Scott King Award Author and Illustrator Honor Book as well as a finalist for the 2022 National Book Award for Young People's Literature.

== Personal life ==
Smith first married Jimi Denise Paschal from 1967 to 1973, with whom he had one child. He then married Denise M. "Akiba" Kyle in 1977, with whom he had four children. The two divorced in 2000, and Smith married Delois Jordan in the same year.

== Recognition ==
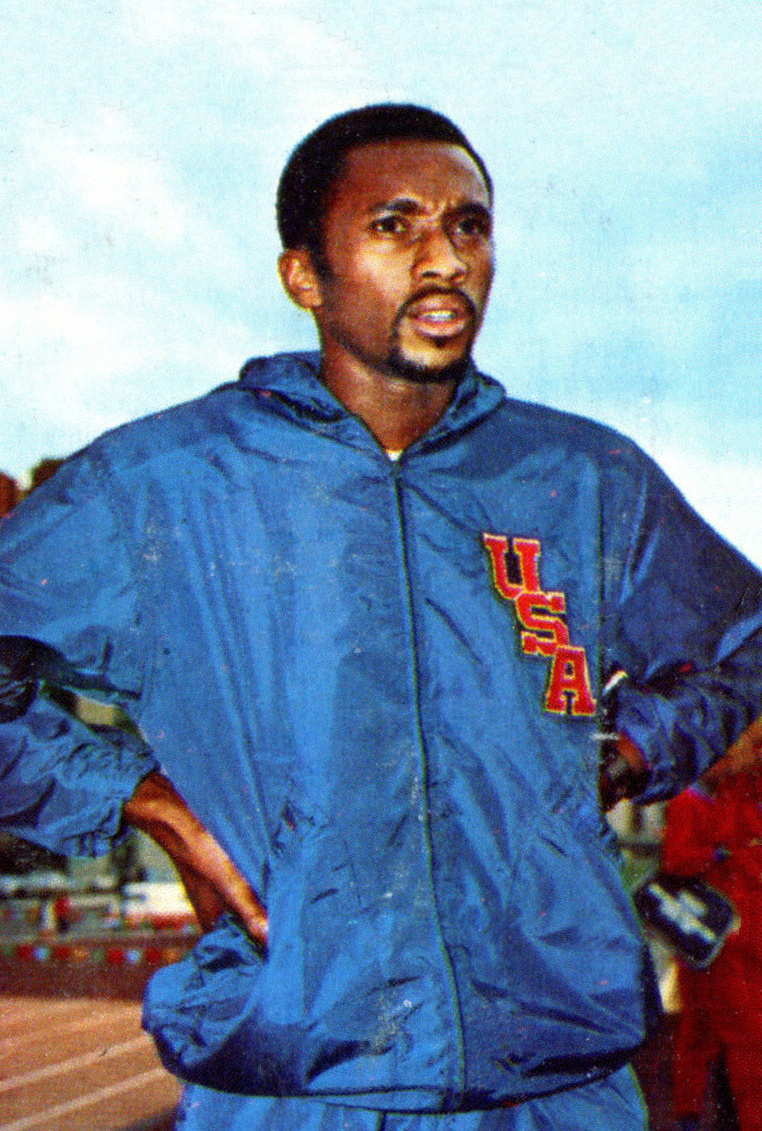
Tommie Smith in the 1960s

Tommie Smith is featured in the 1999 HBO documentary Fists of Freedom: The Story of the '68 Summer Games. The documentary looks at events leading up to, during and after the 1968 Olympics. It features interviews with Smith, Carlos and sociologist Harry Edwards. There is archival footage of the Games and the fallout after the raised fist salutes by Carlos and Smith. Smith says in the programme:

We were not Antichrists. We were just human beings who saw a need to bring attention to the inequality in our country. I don't like the idea of people looking at it as negative. There was nothing but a raised fist in the air and a bowed head, acknowledging the American flag – not symbolizing a hatred for it.

For his lifelong commitment to athletics, education, and human rights, Smith received the Courage of Conscience Award from The Peace Abbey in Sherborn, Massachusetts. In 2004, a sports hall bearing his name was inaugurated in his presence at Saint-Ouen, France.

In 2005, a statue titled Victory Salute showing Smith and Carlos on the medal stand was constructed by political artist Rigo 23 and dedicated on the campus of San Jose State University. Norman's silver medal position was left vacant at his request, so visitors could pose for photos in solidarity with Smith and Carlos, as Norman had stood.

A mural of the photo taken with Smith on the podium at the 1968 Olympics with Carlos and Norman was painted on the brick wall of a residence in Newtown, New South Wales, Australia, titled "Three Proud People Mexico 68". The house's owner, Silvio Offria, allowed an artist known only as "Donald" to paint the mural, and said that Norman came to Newtown to see the mural and have his photo taken with it before he died in 2006. The mural faces the train tracks linking Sydney city to the Western and Southern Suburbs. In 2012, the Sydney City Council heritage listed the mural to safeguard it, after it had faced possible demolition in 2010 to make way for a railway tunnel. Smith and Carlos were pallbearers at Norman's funeral in Melbourne in 2006.

On July 16, 2008, Smith and Carlos accepted the Arthur Ashe Award for Courage for the salute at the 2008 ESPY Awards. In 2018, Smith received the Dresden Peace Prize.

The Tommie Smith Youth Track Meet is held annually in his honor. It has been both an AAU and USATF-sponsored event, held at the University of California, Berkeley at Edwards Stadium.

San Jose State University has secured funding to rebuild the track and field complex. The centerpiece is Speed City Legacy Center, which pays tribute to SJSU alumni track stars and civil rights advocates.

== Awards ==
- World Athletics Awards - President's award：2020

== See also ==
- Timeline of the civil rights movement
- Bay Area Sports Hall of Fame
- Other American Football League players
- Men's 200 metres world record progression

Records
Preceded by (United States) Henry Carr	Men's 200 meters world record holders October 16, 1968 – September 12, 1979	Succeeded by (Italy) Pietro Mennea

Achievements
Preceded by (United States) Henry Carr	Men's 200 meters season's best 1965–1968	Succeeded by (United States) John Carlos
