= John Smith (sprinter) =

American sprinter

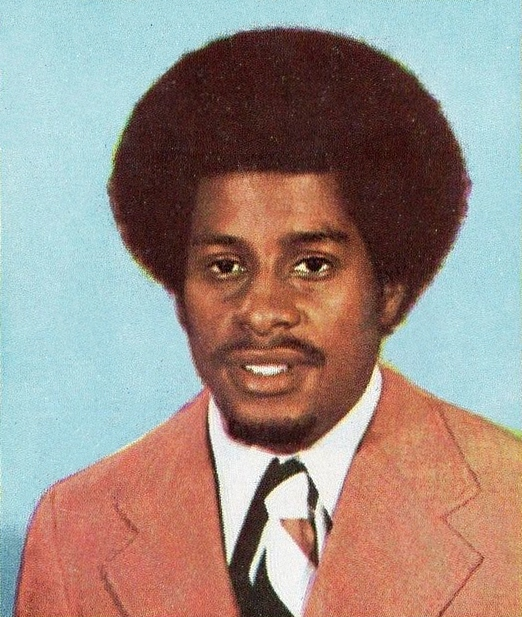

Personal information
- Born: August 5, 1950 (age 76) Los Angeles, California, U.S.
- Height: 188 cm (6 ft 2 in)
- Weight: 83 kg (183 lb)

Sport
- Sport: Athletics
- Events: Sprint, long jump
- Club: Southern California Striders

Achievements and titles
- Personal bests: 100 y – 9.4 (1971); 220 y – 20.7 (1970); 400 m – 44.2 (1971); 440 y – 44.5 WR (1971); LJ – 7.43 m (1968)
Medal record
Representing the United States
Pan American Games
Gold medal – first place	1971 Cali	400 m
Gold medal – first place	1971 Cali	4×400 m relay

John Walton Smith (born August 5, 1950) is an American former athlete, who competed in the sprints events during his career. He is best known for winning the 400 m event at the 1971 Pan American Games. He remains the world record holder for the 440 yard dash at 44.5 seconds. He set the record while winning the USA Outdoor Track and Field Championships on June 26, 1971 while running for the Southern California Striders. The record has stood since then due to metrification in the sport. Contemporary athletes rarely run or are timed officially for the extra 2.34 meters to equal 440 yards.

Smith came as a favorite to the 1972 Summer Olympics, but injured a hamstring in the 400 m final and failed to finish the race.

After retiring from competition, he became a sprint coach, training Maurice Greene and Ato Boldon amongst others. At the time, his team called HSI (standing for Hudson Smith International) was the top sprint team in the world. He coached Carmelita Jeter, who held the second fastest 100 m time after Florence Griffith-Joyner. He also coaches/coached Norwegian sprinter Jaysuma Saidy Ndure, Nigerian sprinter Blessing Okagbare, Commonwealth Games Champion, and English Gardner, NCAA Champion at Oregon and US Outdoor Champion.

Smith ran for Fremont High School in Los Angeles, finishing fifth in the 440 at the CIF California State Meet two consecutive seasons, 1967-8. He also won the City Championships in the long jump. In 1967, he finished one place behind Wayne Collett from Gardena High School, one year his senior. He would next join Collett at UCLA, forming a powerhouse team. They won the NCAA 4×440/400 relay championships four consecutive seasons, 1969-72. Smith won the individual 440 in 1971 and 400 in 1972 and both years UCLA won the overall team championship. Both Collett and Smith qualified for the 1972 Olympic team in the 400. Following his athletic career, he coached UCLA for 17 years before branching off to the HSI team.

== Athletes coached by John Smith ==
- Steve Lewis 3 Olympic gold medals, 1 silver, World Junior Record 400 meters since 1988
- Marie-José Pérec France 3 Olympic gold medals, 2 World Championship gold medals
- Kevin Young Olympic gold medal, 1 World Championship gold medal, world record 400 meters hurdles since 1992
- Danny Everett Olympic gold and bronze medals
- Michael Marsh 2 Olympic gold medals, 1 silver, 1 World Championship gold medal
- Quincy Watts 2 Olympic gold medals, 2 World Championship medals, 1 gold
- Mike Powell 2 Olympic silver medals, 2 World Championship gold medals, world record in the long jump since 1991
- Maurice Greene 4 Olympic medals, 2 gold, 5 World Championship gold medals, World record 100 metres
- Inger Miller 1 Olympic gold medal, 5 World Championship medals, 3 gold but 1 disqualified due to Marion Jones
- David Neville 2 Olympic medals, 1 gold
- Lawrence Johnson Olympic silver medal
- Hadi Soua'an Al-Somaily Saudi Arabia Olympic silver medal
- Ato Boldon Trinidad and Tobago 4 Olympic medals, 4 World Championship medals, 1 gold
- Dalilah Muhammad Olympic Gold Medal, 2 World Championship Silver Medals
- Jon Drummond 2 Olympic medals, 1 gold, 2 World Championship gold medals
- Allen Johnson Olympic gold medal, 5 World Championship medals, 4 gold
- English Gardner 1 Olympic Gold Medal, 2 World Championship Silver Medals
- Dawn Harper 2 Olympic medals, 1 gold, 2 World Championship Medals
- Richard Thompson Trinidad and Tobago 3 Olympic medals, 1 World Championship medal
- Emmanuel Callender Trinidad and Tobago 2 Olympic medals, 1 World Championship medal
- Tasha Danvers United Kingdom 1 Olympic medal
- Kristi Castlin 1 Olympic Bronze Medal
- Cathy Freeman Australia trained with HSI for a short period of time. 2 Olympic medals, 1 gold, 2 World Championship gold medals
- Torri Edwards 1 Olympic medal disqualified due to Marion Jones, 4 World Championship medals, 2 gold
- Jason Richardson Olympic silver medal, World Championship gold medal
- Christian Coleman 2 World Championship Silver Medals, World Indoor Championship Gold Medal, World Indoor Record Holder for the 60 meter dash
- Regina Jacobs 2 World Championship silver medals
- Anju Bobby George India first World Championship medal for India
- Jehue Gordon Trinidad and Tobago 1 World Championship Gold Medal
- Khalifa St. Fort Trinidad and Tobago 1 World Championship Bronze Medal
- Dezerea Bryant 1 World Championship Silver Medal
- Michael Norman 2 World Junior Championship Gold Medals, World Indoor 400m Record Holder
- Leonard Scott World Indoor Championship Gold Medal
- Martial Mbandjock France
- Pilar McShine Trinidad and Tobago
- Jaysuma Saidy Ndure Norway
- Mohammed Shaween Saudi Arabia
- Kenneth Ferguson
- Jason Pyrah
- Marie-Josée Ta Lou
