= List of African Games medalists in athletics (men) =

This is the complete list of African Games medalists in men's athletics from 1965 to 2015.

== 100 metres ==
Games	Gold	Silver	Bronze
1965	Gaoussou Koné (CIV)	John Owiti (KEN)	Folu Erinle (NGR)
1973	Ohene Karikari (GHA)	Barka Sy (SEN)	John Mwebi (KEN)
1978	Amadou Meïté (CIV)	Peter Okodogbe (NGR)	Ohene Karikari (GHA)
1987	Chidi Imoh (NGR)	Eric Akogyiram (GHA)	Charles-Louis Seck (SEN)
1991	Frankie Fredericks (NAM)	Davidson Ezinwa (NGR)	Emmanuel Tuffour (GHA)
1995	Davidson Ezinwa (NGR)	Emmanuel Tuffour (GHA)	Osmond Ezinwa (NGR)
1999	Leonard Myles-Mills (GHA)	Francis Obikwelu (NGR)	Frankie Fredericks (NAM)
2003	Deji Aliu (NGR)	Uchenna Emedolu (NGR)	Leonard Myles-Mills (GHA)
2007	Olusoji Fasuba (NGR)	Eric Nkansah (GHA)	Uchenna Emedolu (NGR)
2011	Amr Seoud (EGY)	Ben Youssef Meïté (CIV)	Obinna Metu (NGR)
2015	Ben Youssef Meïté (CIV)	Ogho-Oghene Egwero (NGR)	Wilfried Koffi Hua (CIV)
2019	Raymond Ekevwo (NGR)	Arthur Cissé (CIV)	Usheoritse Itsekiri (NGR)

== 200 metres ==
Event	Gold		Silver		Bronze	
1965 Brazzaville	Gaoussou Koné (CIV)	21.1	David Ejoke (NGA)	21.4	Jean-Louis Ravelomanantsoa (MAD)	21.7
1973 Lagos	Ohene Karikari (GHA)	21.13	George Daniels (GHA)	21.32	John Mwebi (KEN)	21.53
1978 Algiers	Hassan El Kashief (SUD)	20.77 (NR)	Patrice Ouré (CIV)	20.90	Roland Joe Siai-Siai (NGA)	20.98
1987 Nairobi	Simeon Kipkemboi (KEN)	20.90	John Myles-Mills (GHA)	20.94	Ikpoto Eseme (NGA)	21.01
1991 Cairo	Frankie Fredericks (NAM)	20.28	Emmanuel Tuffour (GHA)	20.59	Daniel Effiong (NGA)	20.62
1995 Harare	Sunday Bada (NGA)	20.28	Emmanuel Tuffour (GHA)	20.29	Joseph Gikonyo (KEN)	20.80
1999 Johannesburg	Francis Obikwelu (NGA)	20.06 (GR)	Joseph Batangdon (CMR)	20.37	Daniel Effiong (NGA)	20.49
2003 Abuja	Uchenna Emedolu (NGA)	20.42	Frankie Fredericks (NAM)	20.43	Aziz Zakari (GHA)	20.51
2007 Algiers	Leigh Julius (RSA)	20.81	Seth Amoo (GHA)	20.88	Obinna Metu (NGA)	20.94
2011 Maputo	Idrissa Adam (CMR)	20.66	Ben Youssef Meïté (CIV)	20.76	Obakeng Ngwigwa (BOT)	20.94
2015 Brazzaville	Wilfried Koffi Hua (CIV)	20.42	Divine Oduduru (NGR)	20.45	Tega Odele (NGR)	20.58
2019 Rabat	Sydney Siame (ZAM)	20.35	Divine Oduduru (NGR)	20.54	Anaso Jobodwana (RSA)	20.56

== 400 metres ==
Event	Gold		Silver		Bronze	
1965	Wilson Kiprugut; Kenya	46.9	James Addy; Ghana	47.4	Amadou Gakou; Senegal	47.7
1973	Charles Asati; Kenya	46.31	Tegegne Bezabeh; Ethiopia	46.8	Mulugetta Tadesse; Ethiopia	47.17
1978	Hassan El Kashief; Sudan	45.32	Dele Udo; Nigeria	45.65	Cyril Etoori; Uganda	45.65
1987	Innocent Egbunike; Nigeria	44.23	David Kitur; Kenya	44.93	Moses Ugbisien; Nigeria	45.35
1991	Samson Kitur; Kenya	45.40	Sunday Bada; Nigeria	45.81	Francis Ogola; Uganda	46.21
1995	Samson Kitur; Kenya	44.36	Sunday Bada; Nigeria	45.03	Jude Monye; Nigeria	45.17
1999	Kennedy Ochieng; Kenya	44.77	Clement Chukwu; Nigeria	45.31	Philip Mukomana; Zimbabwe	45.43
2003	Ezra Sambu; Kenya	44.98	Nagmeldin Ali Abubakr; Sudan	45.22	Sofiane Labidi; Tunisia	45.42
2007	California Molefe; Botswana	45.59	Young Talkmore Nyongani; Zimbabwe	45.76	Mathieu Gnanligo; Benin	45.89
2011	Rabah Yousif (SUD)	45.27	Tobi Ogunmola (NGR)	45.82	Mark Mutai (KEN)	46.52
2015	Isaac Makwala (BOT)	44.35	Boniface Mweresa (KEN)	45.01	Onkabetse Nkobolo (BOT)	45.50

== 800 metres ==
Event	Gold		Silver		Bronze	
1965	Wilson Kiprugut; Kenya	1:47.4	Papa M'Baye N'Diaye; Senegal	1:48.6	Peter Francis; Kenya	1:49.1
1973	Cosmas Silei; Kenya	1:45.38	John Kipkurgat; Kenya	1:47.29	Mohamed Sid Ali Djouadi; Algeria	1:48.70
1978	James Maina Boi; Kenya	1:47.14	Amar Brahmia; Algeria	1:47.54	Peter Lemashon; Kenya	1:47.83
1987	Billy Konchellah; Kenya	1:45.99	Stephen Marai; Kenya	1:46.64	Dieudonné Kwizera; Burundi	1:46.69
1991	William Tanui; Kenya	1:47.40	Robert Kibet; Kenya	1:47.69	Kennedy Osei; Ghana	1:48.41
1995	Arthémon Hatungimana; Burundi	1:47.42	Vincent Malakwen; Kenya	1:47.43	Savieri Ngidhi; Zimbabwe	1:47.61
1999	Japheth Kimutai; Kenya	1:44.91	Djabir Saïd-Guerni; Algeria	1:45.32	Hezekiél Sepeng; South Africa	1:45.58
2003	Samwel Mwera; Tanzania	1:46.13	Mbulaeni Mulaudzi; South Africa	1:46.44	Justus Koech; Kenya	1:46.50
2007	Abubaker Kaki Khamis; Sudan	1:45.22	Mbulaeni Mulaudzi; South Africa	1:45.54	Justus Koech; Kenya	1:45.80
2011	Taoufik Makhloufi (ALG)	1:46:32	Boaz Lalang (KEN)	1:46:40	Job Koech Kinyor (KEN)	1:46:52
2015	Nijel Amos (BOT)	1:50.45	Taoufik Makhloufi (ALG)	1:50.72	Job Koech Kinyor (KEN)	1:50.79

== 1500 metres ==
Event	Gold		Silver		Bronze	
1965	Kipchoge Keino; Kenya	3:41.1	Charles Maina; Kenya	3:47.8	Ahmed Issa; Chad	3:47.8 (NR)
1973	Filbert Bayi; Tanzania	3:37.23	Kipchoge Keino; Kenya	3:39.63	Shibrou Regassa; Ethiopia	3:40.04
1978	Filbert Bayi; Tanzania	3:36.21	Wilson Waigwa; Kenya	3:36.48	Amar Brahmia; Algeria	3:37.33
1987	Sisa Kirati; Kenya	3:39.40	Wilfred Kirochi; Kenya	3:39.66	Joseph Chesire; Kenya	3:39.84
1991	William Kemei; Kenya	3:41.97	Desta Asgedom; Ethiopia	3:42.65	Alemayehu Roba; Ethiopia	3:42.91
1995	Vincent Malakwen; Kenya	3:40.11	Reuben Chesang; Kenya	3:40.66	Julius Achon; Uganda	3:40.83
1999	Hailu Mekonnen; Ethiopia	3:39.73	David Lelei; Kenya	3:40.46	Fred Cheruiyot; Kenya	3:41.21
2003	Paul Korir; Kenya	3:37.52	Robert Rono; Kenya	3:38.13	Benjamin Kipkurui; Kenya	3:38.94
2007	Asbel Kiprop; Kenya	3:38.97	Antar Zerguelaïne; Algeria	3:39.04	Tarek Boukensa; Algeria	3:39.18
2011	Caleb Ndiku (KEN)	3:39.12	Collins Cheboi (KEN)	3:39.72	Taoufik Makhloufi (ALG)	3:39.99
2015	Mekonnen Gebremedhin (ETH)	3:45.73	Abdi Waiss Mouhyadin (DJI)	3:45.98	Salim Keddar (ALG)	3:46.31

== 5000 metres ==
Event	Gold		Silver		Bronze	
1965	Kipchoge Keino; Kenya	13:44.4	Naftali Temu; Kenya	13:58.4	Mamo Wolde; Ethiopia	14:18.6
1973	Ben Jipcho; Kenya	14:07.21	Miruts Yifter; Ethiopia	14:07.57	Paul Mose; Kenya	14:08.43
1978	Yohannes Mohamed; Ethiopia	13:44.39	Michael Musyoki; Kenya	13:44.79	Suleiman Nyambui; Tanzania	13:49.60
1987	John Ngugi; Kenya	13:31.87	Paul Kipkoech; Kenya	13:36.32	Peter Koech; Kenya	13:44.94
1991	Fita Bayisa; Ethiopia	13:36.91	Ibrahim Kinuthia; Kenya	13:37.67	Ondoro Osoro; Kenya	13:38.60
1995	Josephat Machuka; Kenya	13:31.11	Habte Jifar; Ethiopia	13:45.11	Ayele Mezgebu; Ethiopia	13:46.02
1999	Julius Gitahi; Kenya	13:49.06	Fita Bayisa; Ethiopia	13:49.79	Tom Nyariki; Kenya	13:50.40
2003	Kenenisa Bekele; Ethiopia	13:26.16 GR	Hailu Mekonnen; Ethiopia	13:26.73	John Kibowen; Kenya	13:29.14
2007	Moses Ndiema Kipsiro; Uganda	13:12:51	Josphat Kiprono Menjo; Kenya	13:12.64	Tariku Bekele; Ethiopia	13:13.43
2011	Moses Ndiema Kipsiro (UGA)	13:43.08	Yenew Alamirew (ETH)	13:43.33	Abayneh Ayele (ETH)	13:43.51
2015	Getaneh Molla (ETH)	13:21.88	Leulsi Gebresilase (ETH)	13:22.13	Thomas Longosiwa (KEN)	13:22.72

== 10000 metres ==
Event	Gold		Silver		Bronze	
1973	Miruts Yifter; Ethiopia	29:04.6	Paul Mose; Kenya	29:50.8	Richard Juma; Kenya	29:24.3
1978	Henry Rono; Kenya	27:58.90	Michael Musyoki; Kenya	28:05.20	Mohamed Kedir; Ethiopia	28:42.00
1987	Paul Kipkoech; Kenya	28:34.77	Abebe Mekonnen; Ethiopia	28:58.70	Some Muge; Kenya	28:59.96
1991	Thomas Osano; Kenya	27:56.45	William Koech; Kenya	27:56.86	Chala Kelele; Ethiopia	28:11.73
1995	Josephat Machuka; Kenya	28:03.6	Habte Jifar; Ethiopia	28:26.3	Paul Koech; Kenya	28:28.8
1999	Assefa Mezgebu; Ethiopia	28:12.15	David Chelule; Kenya	28:13.71	Habte Jifar; Ethiopia	28:15.11
2003	Sileshi Sihine; Ethiopia	27:42.13	Gebregziabher Gebremariam; Ethiopia	27:43.12	Dejene Berhanu; Ethiopia	27:47.19
2007	Zersenay Tadese; Eritrea	27:00.30 GR	Tadese Tola; Ethiopia	27:28.08	Gebregziabher Gebremariam; Ethiopia	27:41.24
2011	Ibrahim Jeilan (ETH)	28:18.22	Bedan Karoki Muchiri (KEN)	28:19.22	Azmeraw Bekele (ETH)	28:19.32
2015	Tsebelu Zewude (ETH)	27:27.19	Leonard Barsoton (KEN)	27:27.55	Adugna Takele (ETH)	27:28.40

== Marathon ==
Event	Gold		Silver		Bronze	
1973	Mamo Wolde; Ethiopia	2:17:33	Lengissa Bedane; Ethiopia	2:18:16	Richard Mabuza; Swaziland	2:34:18
1978	Richard Mabuza; Swaziland	2:21:53	Dereje Nedi; Ethiopia	2:23:08	Girma Guebre; Ethiopia	2:27:35
1987	Belayneh Dinsamo; Ethiopia	2:14:47	Dereje Nedi; Ethiopia	2:15:27	Kebede Balcha; Ethiopia	2:16:07
1991	Tena Negere; Ethiopia	2:31:17	Ernest Tjela; Lesotho	2:31:42	Allaoua Khellil; Algeria	2:32:29
1995	Nicolas Nyengerai; Zimbabwe	2:20:08	Honest Mutsairo; Zimbabwe	2:20:15	Simon Mrashani; Tanzania	2:20:21
1999	Joshua Peterson; South Africa	2:19:07	Fokasi Wilbrod; Tanzania	2:20:47	Frank Pooe; South Africa	2:23:36
2003	Johannes Kekana; South Africa	2:25:01	Gashaw Asfaw; Ethiopia	2:26:08	Gudisa Shentema; Ethiopia	2:27:39

== Half-marathon ==
Event	Gold		Silver		Bronze	
2007	Deriba Merga; Ethiopia	1:02:24	Martin Sulle; Tanzania	1:03:01	Yonas Kifle; Eritrea	1:03:19
2011	Lelisa Desisa (ETH)	1:04:31	Kenneth Kipkemoi (KEN)	1:04:44	Bekana Daba (ETH)	1:04:51
2015	Zersenay Tadese (ERI)	1:03.11	Luka Kanda (KEN)	1:03.27	Hiskel Tewelde (ERI)	1:03.39

== 3000 metre steeplechase ==
Event	Gold		Silver		Bronze	
1965	Benjamin Kogo; Kenya	8:47.4	Naftali Chirchir; Kenya	8:54.2	Eddy Okadapau; Uganda	9:05.8
1973	Ben Jipcho; Kenya	8:20.74	Evans Mogaka; Kenya	8:26.11	Yohannes Mohamed; Ethiopia	8:32.86
1978	Henry Rono; Kenya	8:15.82	James Munyala; Kenya	8:25.68	Kip Rono; Kenya	8:26.38
1987	Patrick Sang; Kenya	8:33.69	Joshua Kipkemboi; Kenya	8:45.94	Astère Havugiyarémye; Burundi	8:57.19
1991	Moses Kiptanui; Kenya	8:27.09	William Mutwol; Kenya	8:28.29	Johnstone Kipkoech; Kenya	8:33.88
1995	Bernard Barmasai; Kenya	8:27.15	Gideon Chirchir; Kenya	8:29.17	Eliud Barngetuny; Kenya	8:34.57
1999	Kipkurui Misoi; Kenya	8:32.42	Wilson Boit Kipketer; Kenya	8:41.33	Christopher Koskei; Kenya	8:41.35
2003	Ezekiel Kemboi; Kenya	8:12.27 GR	Paul Kipsiele Koech; Kenya	8:14.77	Tewodros Shiferaw; Ethiopia	8:27.33
2007	Willy Komen; Kenya	8:15.11	Ezekiel Kemboi; Kenya	8:16.93	Nahom Mesfin Tariku; Ethiopia	8:39.67
2011	Birhan Getahun (ETH)	8:17.40	Roba Gari (ETH)	8:18.40	Sisay Koreme Mojo (ETH)	8:20.70
2015	Clement Kemboi Kimutai (KEN)	8:20.31	Hillary Kemboi Cheserek (KEN)	8:22.96 SB	Hailemariyam Amare (ETH)	8:24.19 SB

== 110 metres hurdles ==
Event	Gold		Silver		Bronze	
1965	Folu Erinle; Nigeria	14.6	Edward Akika; Nigeria	14.6	Simbara Maki; Ivory Coast	14.7
1973	Fatwell Kimaiyo; Kenya	14.19	Adeola Aboyade-Cole; Nigeria	14.54	Abdoulaye Sarr; Senegal	14.56
1978	Fatwell Kimaiyo; Kenya	13.89	Philip Sang; Kenya	14.02	Thomas Nnakwe; Nigeria	14.35
1987	Judex Lefou; Mauritius	14.11	Gideon Yego; Kenya	14.24	René Djédjémel Mélédjé; Ivory Coast	14.30
1991	Judex Lefou; Mauritius	14.12	Noureddine Tadjine; Algeria	14.17	Emeka Osaji; Nigeria	14.22
1995	William Erese; Nigeria	13.73	Kehinde Aladefa; Nigeria	13.79	Moses Oyiki; Nigeria	13.84
1999	William Erese; Nigeria	13.71	Joseph-Berlioz Randriamihaja; Madagascar	13.85	Kehinde Aladefa; Nigeria	13.86
2003	Joseph-Berlioz Randriamihaja; Madagascar	13.77	Todd Matthews-Jouda; Sudan	13.81	Frikkie van Zyl; South Africa	13.94
2007	Selim Nurudeen; Nigeria	13.59 GR	Joseph-Berlioz Randriamihaja; Madagascar	13.72	Shaun Bownes; South Africa	13.81
2011	Athmane Hadj Lazib (ALG)	13.48 GR	Selim Nurudeen (NGA)	13.61	Samuel Okon (NGA)	13.75
2015	Antonio Alkana (RSA)	13.32 GR	Lyès Mokdel (ALG)	13.49	Tyron Akins (NGA)	13.54

== 400 metres hurdles ==
Event	Gold		Silver		Bronze	
1965	Kimaru Songok; Kenya	51.7	Mamadou Sarr; Senegal	51.9	Samuel Sang; Kenya	52.5
1973	John Akii-Bua; Uganda	48.54	Bill Koskei; Kenya	50.22	Silver Ayoo; Uganda	50.25
1978	Daniel Kimaiyo; Kenya	49.48	John Akii-Bua; Uganda	49.55	Peter Rwamuhanda; Uganda	50.18
1987	Amadou Dia Ba; Senegal	48.03	Shem Ochako; Kenya	48.97	Henry Amike; Nigeria	49.08
1991	Erick Keter; Kenya	48.95	Gideon Yego; Kenya	49.09	Amadou Dia Ba; Senegal	49.12
1995	Ibou Faye; Senegal	49.12	Gideon Biwott; Kenya	49.19	Julius Masvanise; Zimbabwe	49.86
1999	Ibou Faye; Senegal	48.30	Ken Harnden; Zimbabwe	48.47	Erick Keter; Kenya	49.17
2003	Osita Okeagu; Nigeria	50.25	Victor Okorie; Nigeria	50.36	Ibou Faye; Senegal	50.89
2007	L. J. van Zyl; South Africa	48.74	Pieter De Villiers; South Africa	48.91	Alwyn Myburgh; South Africa	48.91
2011	Abderrahmane Hammadi (ALG)	50:48	Kurt Couto (MOZ)	51.04	Julius Rotich (KEN)	51.15
2015	Abdelmalik Lahoulou (ALG)	48.67	Miloud Rahmani (ALG)	49.27	Mohamed Sghaier (TUN)	49.32

== High jump ==
Event	Gold		Silver		Bronze	
1965	Samuel Igun; Nigeria	2.07	Henri Elendé (Republic of the Congo) Congo-Brazzaville	2.03	Ahmed Sénoussi; Chad	1.99
1973	Abdullah Noor Wasughe; Somalia	2.04	Sheikh Tidiane Faye; Gambia	2.04	Ahmadou Evélé; Cameroon	2.00
1978	Paul Ngadjadoum; Chad	2.16	Hamid Sahil; Algeria	2.14	Amadou Dia Ba; Senegal	2.08
1987	Othmane Belfaa; Algeria	2.19	Asmir Okoro; Nigeria	2.16	Paul Ngadjadoum; Chad	2.16
1991	Othmane Belfaa; Algeria	2.18	Boubacar Guèye; Senegal	2.16	Yacine Mousli; Algeria	2.16
1995	Pierre Vorster; South Africa	2.22	Anthony Idiata; Nigeria; Khemraj Naiko; Mauritius	2.19		
1999	Anthony Idiata; Nigeria	2.27 GR	Abderrahmane Hammad; Algeria	2.24	Malcolm Hendriks; South Africa	2.24
2003	Kabelo Mmono; Botswana	2.15	Jude Sidonie; Seychelles	2.10	Samson Idiata; Nigeria	2.10
2007	Kabelo Kgosiemang; Botswana	2.27	Abderrahmane Hammad; Algeria	2.24	Mohamed Benhadia; Algeria; Arinze Obiora; Nigeria	2.20
2011	Ali Mohd Younes Idriss (SUD)	2.25	Kabelo Kgosiemang (BOT)	2.20	William Woodcock (SEY)	2.15
2015	Kabelo Kgosiemang (BOT)	2.25	Ali Mohd Younes Idriss (SUD)	2.22	Chris Moleya (RSA)	2.22

== Pole vault ==
Event	Gold		Silver		Bronze	
1965	Brou Elloé; Ivory Coast	4.15	Mohamed Alaa Ghita; United Arab Republic	4.05	Bernard Gnéplou; Ivory Coast; Jean-Prosper Tsondzabéka (Republic of the Congo) Congo-Brazzaville	4.05
1973	Mohamed Alaa Ghita; Egypt	4.25	Lakhdar Rahal; Algeria	4.20	Jean-Prosper Tsondzabéka; Congo	4.20
1978	Lakhdar Rahal; Algeria	5.00	Ahmed Rezki; Algeria	4.80	Mohamed Bensaad; Algeria	4.80
1987	Choukri Abahnini; Tunisia	4.85	Abdelatif Chekir; Tunisia	4.75	Sami Si Mohamed; Algeria	4.70
1991	Sami Si Mohamed; Algeria	5.20	Belgacem Touami; Algeria	5.10	Jean-Kersley Gardenne; Mauritius	5.00
1995	Okkert Brits; South Africa	5.50	Jean-Kersley Gardenne; Mauritius	5.20	Sameh Hassan Farid; Egypt; Rafik Mefti; Algeria	4.80
1999	Okkert Brits; South Africa	5.40	Mohamed Bédoui; Tunisia	4.80	none	
2003	Béchir Zaghouani; Tunisia	5.20	Fanie Jacobs; South Africa	5.20	Karim Sène; Senegal	5.00
2007	Abderrahmane Tamada; Tunisia	5.10	Karim Sène; Senegal	5.10	Hamdi Dhouibi; Tunisia	4.90
2011	Larbi Bourrada (ALG)	5:00	Mourad Souissi (ALG)	4.00	No mark	
2015	Hichem Khalil Cherabi (ALG)	5.25	Jordan Yamoah (GHA)	5.20	Mohamed Romdhana (TUN)	5.10

== Long jump ==
Event	Gold		Silver		Bronze	
1965	Edward Akika; Nigeria	7.49	Ezzedin Yacoub Hamed; United Arab Republic	7.49	Mansour Dia; Senegal	7.29
1973	Joshua Owusu; Ghana	8.00w	John Okoro; Nigeria	7.83	Mansour Dia; Senegal	7.71
1978	Charlton Ehizuelen; Nigeria	7.92	Fidelis Ndyabagye; Uganda	7.75 (NR)	Emmanuel Mifetu; Ghana	7.57
1987	Paul Emordi; Nigeria	8.23	Yusuf Alli; Nigeria	8.18w	Joseph Kio; Nigeria	7.96
1991	George Ogbeide; Nigeria	8.22	Yusuf Alli; Nigeria	7.81	James Sabulei; Kenya	7.72
1995	Cheikh Touré; Senegal	8.10	Andrew Owusu; Ghana	8.01	Jacob Katonon; Kenya	7.80
1999	Hatem Mersal; Egypt	8.09	Téko Folligan; Togo	8.00	Mark Anthony Awere; Ghana	7.96
2003	Ignisious Gaisah; Ghana	8.30	Ndiss Kaba Badji; Senegal	7.92	Godfrey Khotso Mokoena; South Africa	7.83
2007	Gable Garenamotse; Botswana	8.08 (+0.7)	Arnaud Casquette; Mauritius	8.03 (+1.4)	Godfrey Khotso Mokoena; South Africa	7.99 (+0.6)
2011	Luvo Manyonga (RSA)	8.02 -0.1	Ignisious Gaisah (GHA)	7.86; 0.2	Ndiss Kaba Badji (SEN)	7.83 -0.6
2015	Ndiss Kaba Badji (SEN)	7.74	Mamadou Gueye (SEN)	7.69	Romeo N'tia (BEN)	7.44

== Triple jump ==
Event	Gold		Silver		Bronze	
1965	Samuel Igun; Nigeria	16.27	Mansour Dia; Senegal	15.93	Laurent Sarr; Senegal	15.38
1973	Mansour Dia; Senegal	16.53	Abraham Munabi; Uganda	16.26 (NR)	Moise Pomaney; Ghana	16.09
1978	Charlton Ehizuelen; Nigeria	16.51	Abdoulaye Diallo; Senegal	16.29	Saïd Saad; Algeria	15.93
1987	Francis Dodoo; Ghana	17.12	Joseph Taiwo; Nigeria	16.90w	Toussaint Rabenala; Madagascar	16.35
1991	James Sabulei; Kenya	16.53	Paul Nioze; Seychelles	16.50	Benjamin Koech; Kenya	16.26
1995	Jacob Katonon; Kenya	16.93	Mohamed Karim Sassi; Tunisia	16.75	Ndabazinhle Mdhlongwa; Zimbabwe	16.60
1999	Andrew Owusu; Ghana	16.89	Remmy Limo; Kenya	16.84	Toussaint Rabenala; Madagascar	16.60
2003	Andrew Owusu; Ghana	16.41	Godfrey Khotso Mokoena; South Africa	16.28	Olivier Sanou; Burkina Faso	16.21
2007	Ndiss Kaba Badji; Senegal	16.80 (+0.0)	Hugo Mamba-Schlick; Cameroon	16.61 (+0.0)	Andrew Owusu; Ghana	16.32 (+1.0)
2011	Tosin Oke (NGR)	16.65	Issam Nima (ALG)	16.54	Hugo Mamba-Schlick (CMR)	16.17
2015	Tosin Oke (NGA)	17.00	Olu Olamigoke (NGA)	16.98	Mamadou Chérif Dia (MLI)	16.54

== Shot put ==
Event	Gold		Silver		Bronze	
1965	Denis Ségui Kragbé; Ivory Coast	16.32	Hassan Mahrous; United Arab Republic	14.87	Yovan Ochola; Uganda	14.84
1973	Nagui Asaad; Egypt	19.48	Namakoro Niaré; Mali	16.81	Jean-Marie Djebaili; Algeria	16.63
1978	Nagui Asaad; Egypt	18.88	Namakoro Niaré; Mali	17.16	Emad Fayez; Egypt	16.93
1987	Adewale Olukoju; Nigeria	18.13	Martin Mélagne; Ivory Coast	17.89 (NR)	Ahmed Mohamed Ashoush; Egypt	17.85
1991	Chima Ugwu; Nigeria	17.64	Adewale Olukoju; Nigeria	17.58	Martin Mélagne; Ivory Coast	17.33
1995	Henk Booysen; South Africa	18.80	Chima Ugwu; Nigeria	18.55	Jaco Snyman; South Africa	18.44
1999	Burger Lambrechts; South Africa	19.50	Janus Robberts; South Africa	19.16	Karel Potgieter; South Africa	18.90
2003	Burger Lambrechts; South Africa	18.87	Chima Ugwu; Nigeria	18.66	Yasser Ibrahim Farag; Egypt	17.96
2007	Yasser Fathy Ibrahim Farag; Egypt	19.20	Roelie Potgieter; South Africa	19.02	Mohammed Medded; Tunisia	17.94
2011	Yasser Ibrahim Farag (EGY)	19.73 GR	Jaco Engelbrecht (RSA)	18.89	Roelie Potgieter (RSA)	18.68
2015	Franck Elemba (CGO)	20.25 GR, NR	Mohamed Magdi Hamza (EGY)	19.78	Jaco Engelbrecht (RSA)	19.55

== Discus throw ==
Event	Gold		Silver		Bronze	
1965	Namakoro Niaré; Mali	51.20	Denis Ségui Kragbé; Ivory Coast	50.84	Patrick Anukwa; Nigeria	45.16
1973	Namakoro Niaré; Mali	55.28	Nagui Asaad; Egypt	53.60	Denis Ségui Kragbé; Ivory Coast	52.12
1978	Namakoro Niaré; Mali	58.02	Abderrazak Ben Hassine; Tunisia	55.74	Tiékité Somet; Côte d'Ivoire	51.86
1987	Adewale Olukoju; Nigeria	56.50	Mohamed Naguib Hamed; Egypt	56.08	Hassan Ahmed Hamad; Egypt	55.84
1991	Adewale Olukoju; Nigeria	59.22	Mohamed Naguib Hamed; Egypt	55.32	Hassan Ahmed Hamad; Egypt	54.90
1995	Adewale Olukoju; Nigeria	61.68	Mickaël Conjungo; Central African Republic	58.94	Frits Potgieter; South Africa	58.54
1999	Frantz Kruger; South Africa	61.02	Frits Potgieter; South Africa	60.59	Mickaël Conjungo; Central African Republic	57.09
2003	Omar Ahmed El Ghazaly; Egypt	63.61 GR	Hannes Hopley; South Africa	62.86	Johannes van Wyk; South Africa	62.43
2007	Omar Ahmed El Ghazaly; Egypt	62.28	Yasser Fathy Ibrahim Farag; Egypt	61.58	Hannes Hopley; South Africa	57.79
2011	Yasser Ibrahim Farag (EGY)	63.20	Victor Hogan (RSA)	62.60	Russell Tucker (RSA)	55.98
2015	Russell Tucker (RSA)	60.41	Essohounamondom Tchalim (TOG)	52.72 NR	Franck Elemba (CGO)	50.30

== Hammer throw ==
Event	Gold		Silver		Bronze	
1973	Yovan Ochola; Uganda	50.64	Gabriel Luzira; Uganda	49.86	Seifullah Negmeddin Shaheen; Egypt	47.58
1978	Youssef Ben Abid; Tunisia	54.90	Abdellah Boubekeur; Algeria	54.74	Noureddine Bendifallah; Algeria	52.20
1987	Hakim Toumi; Algeria	70.10	Yacine Louail; Algeria	63.66	Ahmed Ibrahim Taha; Egypt	57.52
1991	Sherif Farouk El Hennawi; Egypt	67.58	Hakim Toumi; Algeria	63.12	Magdi Zakaria Abdallah; Egypt	62.10
1995	Hakim Toumi; Algeria	67.12	Sherif Farouk El Hennawi; Egypt	66.68	Mohamed Karim Horchani; Tunisia	65.78
1999	Chris Harmse; South Africa	74.75	Samir Haouam; Algeria	65.80	Yamen Hussein Abdel Moneim; Egypt	65.25
2003	Chris Harmse; South Africa	75.17	Saber Souid; Tunisia	70.81	Samir Haouam; Algeria	68.95
2007	Chris Harmse; South Africa	76.73	Mohsen Mohamed Anani; Egypt	72.00	Saber Souid; Tunisia	70.01
2011	Mostafa El Gamel (EGY)	74.76	Chris Harmse (RSA)	74.66	Hassan Mohamed Mahmoud (EGY)	69.70
2015	Mostafa El Gamel (EGY)	74.92	Chris Harmse (RSA)	73.49	Nicholas Li Yun Fong (MRI)	59.36

== Javelin throw ==
Event	Gold		Silver		Bronze	
1965	Anthony Oyakhire; Nigeria	71.52	Cheruon Kiptalam; Kenya	70.46	Elie Yanyambal; Chad	68.54
1973	Jacques Ayé Abehi; Ivory Coast	77.22	John Mayaka; Kenya	71.08	François Ganongo; Congo	69.26
1978	Justin Arop; Uganda	76.94	Ali Memmi; Tunisia	71.28	John Mayaka; Kenya	70.76
1987	Justin Arop; Uganda	73.42	Zakayo Malekwa; Tanzania	72.32	George Odera; Kenya	71.30
1991	Christian Okemefula; Nigeria	77.14	Pius Bazighe; Nigeria	71.78	James Saina; Kenya	71.44
1995	Pius Bazighe; Nigeria	77.56	Phillip Spies; South Africa	76.24	Louis Fouché; South Africa	75.04
1999	Marius Corbett; South Africa	78.74	Johan Vosloo; South Africa	75.60	Maher Ridane; Tunisia	72.18
2003	Gerhardus Pienaar; South Africa	76.95	Walid Abderrazak Mohamed; Egypt	73.79	Brian Erasmus; South Africa	72.94
2007	John Robert Oosthuizen; South Africa	78.05	Gerhardus Pienaar; South Africa	76.70	Mohamed Ali Kebabou; Tunisia	71.77
2011	Julius Yego (KEN)	78.34 NR	Bernard Crous (RSA)	72.68	Friday Osanyade (NGR)	71.01
2015	Ihab Abdelrahman (EGY)	85.37 GR	John Ampomah (GHA)	82.94	Phil-Mar van Rensburg (RSA)	76.85

== Decathlon ==
Event	Gold		Silver		Bronze	
1978	Mohamed Bensaad; Algeria	7338	Brown Ebewele; Nigeria	6876	Alain Smaïl; Algeria	6822
1987	Mourad Mahour Bacha; Algeria	7104	Mbanefo Akpom; Nigeria	6979	Geoffrey Seurey; Kenya	6918
1991	Mourad Mahour Bacha; Algeria	7431	Tommy Ozono; Nigeria	7163	Sid Ali Sabour; Algeria	6956
1995	Danie van Wyk; South Africa	7339	Anis Riahi; Tunisia	7165	Sid Ali Sabour; Algeria	6986
1999	Anis Riahi; Tunisia	7497	Rédouane Youcef; Algeria	7401	Patrick Legrand; Mauritius	6034
2003	Mustafa Taha Hussein; Egypt	7400 points	Lee Okoroafor; Nigeria	7240 points	Rédouane Youcef; Algeria	7119 points
2007	Hamdi Dhouibi; Tunisia	7838 points GR	Boualem Lamri; Algeria	7473 points	Larbi Bourrada; Algeria	7349 points
2011	Jangy Addy (LBR)	7985 pts GR	Guillaume Thierry (MRI)	7481 pts NR	Ali Kamé (MAD)	7458 pts
2015	Guillaume Thierry (MRI)	7591 NR	Atsu Nyamadi (GHA)	7478	Fredriech Pretorius (RSA)	7186

== 20 km road walk ==
Event	Gold		Silver		Bronze	
1978	Benamar Kachkouche; Algeria	1:39:21	Hunde Ture; Egypt	1:39:51	Elisha Kasuka; Kenya	1:43:21
1987	Shemsu Hassan; Ethiopia	1:35:57	William Sawe; Kenya	1:42:30	Mutisya Kilonzo; Kenya	1:43:04
1991	Shemsu Hassan; Ethiopia	1:29:04	Abdelwahab Ferguène; Algeria	1:35:21	Abderrahmane Djebbar; Algeria	1:38:11
1995	Chris Britz; South Africa	1:28:06	David Kimutai; Kenya	1:31:02	Shemsu Hassan; Ethiopia	1:32:03
1999	David Kimutai; Kenya	1:29:12	Moussa Aouanouk; Algeria	1:29:36	Vincent Asumang; Ghana	1:48:00
2003	Hatem Ghoula; Tunisia	1:30:32	Moussa Aouanouk; Algeria	1:30:36	Arezki Yahiaoui; Algeria	1:35:19
2007	Hatem Ghoula; Tunisia	1:22:33	David Kimutai; Kenya	1:24:16	Mohamed Ameur; Algeria	1:25:12
2011	Hassanine Sebei (TUN)	1:24:53	Hédi Teraoui (TUN)	1:26:44	Gabriel Ngintedem (CMR)	1:32:08
2015	Lebogang Shange (RSA)	1:26.43	Samuel Gathimba (KEN)	1:26.44	Wayne Snyman (RSA)	1:27.32

== 4 × 100 metres relay ==
Event	Gold		Silver		Bronze	
1965	Senegal	40.5	Nigeria	40.8	Ghana	40.9
1973	Nigeria	39.89	Ghana	40.01	Ivory Coast	40.23
1978	Ghana	39.24	Nigeria	39.39	Congo	39.79
1987	Nigeria	39.06	Kenya	39.64	Senegal	39.70
1991	Nigeria	39.36	Sierra Leone	39.66	Senegal	40.00
1995	Ghana	39.12	Sierra Leone	39.51	Ivory Coast	39.61
1999	Nigeria; Daniel Effiong; Chinedu Oriala; Innocent Asonze ?	38.56 GR	South Africa	38.88	Ivory Coast	39.09
2003	Ghana; Christian Nsiah; Eric Nkansah; Aziz Zakari; Leonard Myles-Mills	38.63	Nigeria; Aaron Egbele; Tamunosiki Atorudibo; Deji Musa; Deji Aliu	38.70	Senegal; Oumar Loum; Doudou Felou Sow; Gora Diop; Abdou Demba Lam	39.79
2007	Nigeria; Isaac Uche, Obinna Metu, Chinedu Oriala, Olusoji Fasuba	38.91	South Africa; Morné Nagel, Leigh Julius, Lee-Roy Newton, Sherwin Vries	39.11	Zimbabwe; Ngonidzashe Makusha, Gabriel Mvumvure, Brian Dzingai, Lewis Banda	39.16 NR
2011	Nigeria	38.93	Ghana	38.95	Botswana	39.09
2015	Ivory Coast; Christopher Naliali; Wilfried Koffi Hua; Arthur Cissé; Ben Youssef Meïté	38.93	Namibia; Even Tjiviju; Hitjivirue Kaanjuka; Dantago Gurirab; Jesse Urikhob	39.22	Ghana; Daniel Gyasi; Solomon Afful; Emmanuel Dasor; Shepherd Agbeko	39.71

== 4 × 400 metres relay ==
Event	Gold		Silver		Bronze	
1965	Senegal	3:11.5	Kenya	3:12.2	Ghana	3:12.2
1973	Kenya	3:06.38	Nigeria	3:06.98	Uganda	3:07.21
1978	Nigeria	3:03.24	Uganda	3:04.20	Kenya	3:05.92
1987	Nigeria; Moses Ugbisien; Joseph Fallaye; Henry Amike; Innocent Egbunike	3:00.55 GR	Kenya; John Anzarah; Tito Sawe; Elkana Nyangau; David Kitur	3:01.00	Burundi; P.C. Nyabenda; C. Rugerinyange; A. Nsazurwimo; Dieudonné Kwizera	3:06.91
1991	Kenya	3:03.14	Nigeria	3:03.72	Ghana	3:08.18
1995	Nigeria	3:01.63	Kenya	3:03.11	South Africa	3:03.65
1999	Nigeria	3:01.20	South Africa	3:01.34	Kenya; Kennedy Ochieng; Hillary Maritim; Matilu Abednego; Julius Chepkwony	3:01.73
2003	Botswana; California Molefe; Kagiso Kilego; Oganeditse Moseki; Johnson Kubisa	3:02.24 NR	Nigeria; Abayomi Agunbiade; James Godday; Bolaji LawaAudul; Musa Audu	3:04.49	Zimbabwe; Crispen Mutakanyi; Godwin Tauya; Temba Ncube; Young Talkmore Nyongani	3:05.62
2007	Botswana; Zacharia Kamberuka, Isaac Makwala, Obakeng Ngwigwa, Tshepo Kelaotse	3:03.16	Nigeria; Olusegun Ogunkule, Edu Nkami, Victor Isaiah, Saul Weigopwa	3:03.99	Zimbabwe; Nelton Ndebele, Young Talkmore Nyongani, Gabriel Chikomo, Lewis Banda	3:04.84
2011	Kenya; Anderson Mureta; Jonathan Kibet; Vincent Mumo Kiilu; Mark Mutai	3:03.10	Nigeria	3:05.26	Botswana	3:05.92
2015	Kenya; Raymond Kibet; Alex Sampao; Kiprono Koskei; Boniface Mweresa	3:00.34 GR	Botswana; Onkabetse Nkobolo; Nijel Amos; Leaname Maotoanong; Isaac Makwala	3:00.95	Algeria; Miloud Laradt; Miloud Rahmani; Sofiane Bouhedda; Abdelmalik Lahoulou	3:03.07
