= Athletics at the 1965 All-Africa Games =

Athletics at the I All-Africa Games
- Dates: 18–28 July 1965
- Host city: Brazzaville, Congo

The inaugural All African Games were held in Brazzaville, Republic of Congo in July 1965.

== Medal summary ==
=== Men's events ===
Event	Gold		Silver		Bronze	
100 metres	Gaoussou Koné; Ivory Coast	10.3	John Owiti; Kenya	10.5	Folu Erinle; Nigeria	10.6
200 metres	Gaoussou Koné; Ivory Coast	21.1	David Ejoke; Nigeria	21.4	Jean-Louis Ravelomanantsoa; Madagascar	21.7
400 metres	Wilson Kiprugut; Kenya	46.9	James Addy; Ghana	47.4	Amadou Gakou; Senegal	47.7
800 metres	Wilson Kiprugut; Kenya	1:47.4	Papa Mambaye N'Diaye; Senegal	1:48.6	Peter Francis; Kenya	1:49.1
1500 metres	Kip Keino; Kenya	3:41.1	Charles Maina; Kenya	3:47.8	Ahmed Issa; Chad	3:47.8 (NR)
5000 metres	Kip Keino; Kenya	13:44.4	Naftali Temu; Kenya	13:58.4	Mamo Wolde; Ethiopia	14:18.6
3000 metre steeplechase	Benjamin Kogo; Kenya	8:47.4	Naftali Chirchir; Kenya	8:54.2	Eddy Okadapau; Uganda	9:05.8
110 metres hurdles	Folu Erinle; Nigeria	14.6	Edward Akika; Nigeria	14.6	Simbara Maki; Ivory Coast	14.7
400 metres hurdles	Kimaru Songok; Kenya	51.7	Mamadou Sarr; Senegal	51.9	Samuel Sang; Kenya	52.5
4 × 100 metres relay	Senegal; Abdoulaye N'Diaye; Bassirou Doumbia; Malick Diop; Mané Malang	40.5	Nigeria; Sydney Asiodu; Folu Erinle; David Ejoke; Lawrence Okoroafor	40.8	Ghana; James Addy; Michael Ahey; Stanley Allotey; Bonner Mends	40.9
4 × 400 metres relay	Senegal; Amadou Gakou; Papa M'Baye N'Diaye; Daniel Thiaw; Mamadou Sarr	3:11.5	Kenya; Peter Francis; Wilson Kiprugut; Kimaru Songok; Samuel Sang	3:12.2	Ghana; John Asare-Antwi; Samuel Bugri; Ebenezer Quartey; William Quaye	3:12.2
High jump	Samuel Igun; Nigeria	2.07	Henri Elendé (Republic of the Congo) Congo-Brazzaville	2.03	Ahmed Sénoussi; Chad	1.99
Pole vault	Brou Elloé; Ivory Coast	4.15	Mohamed Alaa Ghita; United Arab Republic	4.05	Bernard Gnéplou; Ivory Coast; Jean-Prosper Tsondzabéka (Republic of the Congo) Congo-Brazzaville	4.05
Long jump	Edward Akika; Nigeria	7.49	Ezzedin Yacoub Hamed; United Arab Republic	7.49	Mansour Dia; Senegal	7.29
Triple jump	Samuel Igun; Nigeria	16.27	Mansour Dia; Senegal	15.93	Laurent Sarr; Senegal	15.38
Shot put	Denis Ségui Kragbé; Ivory Coast	16.32	Hassan Mahrous; United Arab Republic	14.87	Yovan Ochola; Uganda	14.84
Discus throw	Namakoro Niaré; Mali	51.20	Denis Ségui Kragbé; Ivory Coast	50.84	Patrick Anukwa; Nigeria	45.16
Javelin throw	Anthony Oyakhire; Nigeria	71.52	Cheruon Kiptalam; Kenya	70.46	Elie Yanyambal; Chad	68.54

=== Women's events ===
Event	Gold		Silver		Bronze	
100 metres	Olajumoke Bodunrin; Nigeria	12.4	Regina Okafor; Nigeria	12.5	Rose Hart; Ghana	12.5
80 metres hurdles	Rose Hart; Ghana	11.7	Diana Monks; Kenya	11.8	Mopelope Obayemi; Nigeria	11.9
4 × 100 metres relay	Nigeria; Olajumoke Bodunrin; Regina Okafor; Irene Erondu; Uche Ezekwesili	48.0	Ghana; Alice Annum; Rose Hart; Phyllis Laryea; Habibah Atta	49.1	Cameroon; Rhita Mahouvet; Marguerite Handy; Bernardette Osogo; Agnes Lembe	49.2
High jump	Amelia Okoli; Nigeria	1.62	Habibah Atta; Ghana	1.59	Regina Awori; Uganda	1.56
Long jump	Alice Anum; Ghana	5.63	Angelina Osuagwu; Nigeria	5.34	Teddy Nakisuyi; Uganda	5.22
Javelin throw	Helena Okwara; Nigeria	40.30	Theresa Dismas; Tanzania	40.24	Angelina Anyikwa; Nigeria	39.48

== Medal table ==
Rank	Nation	Gold	Silver	Bronze	Total
1	Nigeria (NGR)	9	5	4	18
2	Kenya (KEN)	6	7	2	15
3	Ivory Coast (CIV)	4	1	2	7
4	Senegal (SEN)	2	4	2	8
5	Ghana (GHA)	2	2	4	8
6	Mali (MLI)	1	0	0	1
7	United Arab Republic (UAR)	0	3	0	3
8	Congo (CGO)	0	1	1	2
9	Tanzania (TAN)	0	1	0	1
10	Uganda (UGA)	0	0	4	4
11	Chad (CHA)	0	0	3	3
12	Cameroon (CMR)	0	0	1	1
12	Ethiopia (ETH)	0	0	1	1
12	Madagascar (MAD)	0	0	1	1
Totals (14 entries)		24	24	25	73
