= Athletics at the 1966 British Empire and Commonwealth Games – Men's 880 yards =

Men's 880 yards at the 1966 British Empire and Commonwealth Games
- Venue: Independence Park, Kingston
- Dates: August 6 and 8, 1966

Medalists
| gold medal | Noel Clough | Australia |
| silver medal | Wilson Kiprugut | Kenya |
| bronze medal | George Kerr | Jamaica |

The men's 880 yards event at the 1966 British Empire and Commonwealth Games was held on 6 and 8 August at the Independence Park in Kingston, Jamaica. It was the last time that the imperial distance was contested at the Games later being replaced by the 800 metres.

== Medalists ==
Medallists
| Gold | Silver | Bronze |
|---|---|---|
| Noel Clough; Australia | Wilson Kiprugut; Kenya | George Kerr; Jamaica |

== Results ==
=== Heats ===
Qualification: First 3 in each heat (Q) and the next 1 fastest (q) qualify for the semifinals.

Heats results. See qualification criteria
| Rank | Heat | Name | Nationality | Time | Notes |
|---|---|---|---|---|---|
| 1 | 1 | Wilson Kiprugut | Kenya | 1:50.7 | Q |
| 2 | 1 | Robert Rwakojo | Uganda | 1:51.0 | Q |
| 3 | 1 | Keith Wheeler | Australia | 1:51.6 | Q |
| 4 | 1 | Keith Forde | Barbados | 1:51.6 | q |
| 5 | 1 | Ramsay Subramaniam | Malaysia | 1:52.6 | |
| 6 | 1 | Tex Francis | Jamaica | 1:53.2 | |
| 1 | 2 | George Kerr | Jamaica | 1:52.3 | Q |
| 2 | 2 | Benedict Cayenne | Trinidad and Tobago | 1:52.3 | Q |
| 3 | 2 | Lloyd Bacchus | Guyana | 1:52.4 | Q |
| 4 | 2 | Michael Varah | England | 1:52.5 | |
| 5 | 2 | Ergas Leps | Canada | 1:53.1 | |
| 6 | 2 | Franklin Rahming | Bahamas | 1:58.9 | |
| 7 | 2 | Tony Harris | Wales | 2:02.2 | |
| 1 | 3 | John Boulter | England | 1:52.4 | Q |
| 2 | 3 | Brian McLaren | Canada | 1:54.2 | Q |
| 3 | 3 | Noel Clough | Australia | 1:54.4 | Q |
| 4 | 3 | Yvo Labonte | Mauritius | 2:01.9 | |
| 5 | 3 | Fred Sowerby | Antigua and Barbuda | 2:12.0 | |
| | 3 | Neville Myton | Jamaica | DNF | |
| 1 | 4 | Bill Crothers | Canada | 1:51.9 | Q |
| 2 | 4 | Peter Francis | Kenya | 1:51.9 | Q |
| 3 | 4 | Chris Carter | England | 1:51.9 | Q |
| 4 | 4 | Sanghar Khan | Pakistan | 1:53.4 | |
| 5 | 4 | John Amatepey | Ghana | 1:54.3 | |
| 6 | 4 | Ronald Haddad | Jamaica | 1:56.3 | |
| 7 | 4 | Derek Cambridge | Bahamas | 1:58.5 | |
| 1 | 5 | Lennox Yearwood | Trinidad and Tobago | 1:55.0 | Q |
| 2 | 5 | Graeme Grant | Scotland | 1:55.0 | Q |
| 3 | 5 | Ralph Doubell | Australia | 1:55.9 | Q |
| 4 | 5 | Dave Bailey | Canada | 1:56.6 | |
| 5 | 5 | Charles Harewood | Barbados | 1:57.8 | |
| 6 | 5 | Herbert Couacaud | Mauritius | 2:02.3 | |

=== Semifinals ===
Qualification: First 4 in each heat (Q) qualify directly for the final.

Semifinals results
| Rank | Heat | Name | Nationality | Time | Notes |
|---|---|---|---|---|---|
| 1 | 1 | George Kerr | Jamaica | 1:47.7 | Q |
| 2 | 1 | Noel Clough | Australia | 1:47.9 | Q |
| 3 | 1 | Bill Crothers | Canada | 1:47.9 | Q |
| 4 | 1 | Peter Francis | Kenya | 1:48.2 | Q |
| 5 | 1 | Keith Wheeler | Australia | 1:48.6 | |
| 6 | 1 | John Boulter | England | 1:48.8 | |
| 7 | 1 | Benedict Cayenne | Trinidad and Tobago | 1:49.3 | |
| 8 | 1 | Keith Forde | Barbados | 1:49.3 | |
| 1 | 2 | Ralph Doubell | Australia | 1:48.3 | Q |
| 2 | 2 | Wilson Kiprugut | Kenya | 1:48.7 | Q |
| 3 | 2 | Chris Carter | England | 1:49.1 | Q |
| 4 | 2 | Lennox Yearwood | Trinidad and Tobago | 1:49.8 | Q |
| 5 | 2 | Lloyd Bacchus | Guyana | 1:49.8 | |
| 6 | 2 | Brian McLaren | Canada | 1:50.5 | |
| 7 | 2 | Robert Rwakojo | Uganda | 1:51.5 | |
| 8 | 2 | Graeme Grant | Scotland | 1:53.4 | |

=== Final ===
Final results
| Rank | Name | Nationality | Time | Notes |
|---|---|---|---|---|
| 1st place, gold medalist(s) | Noel Clough | Australia | 1:46.9 | GR |
| 2nd place, silver medalist(s) | Wilson Kiprugut | Kenya | 1:47.2 | |
| 3rd place, bronze medalist(s) | George Kerr | Jamaica | 1:47.2 | |
| 4 | Bill Crothers | Canada | 1:47.3 | |
| 5 | Chris Carter | England | 1:48.1 | |
| 6 | Ralph Doubell | Australia | 1:48.3 | |
| 7 | Peter Francis | Kenya | 1:48.3 | |
| 8 | Lennox Yearwood | Trinidad and Tobago | 1:57.5 | |
