= Athletics at the 1973 All-Africa Games =

Athletics at the II All-Africa Games
- Dates: 9–17 January 1973
- Host city: Lagos, Nigeria

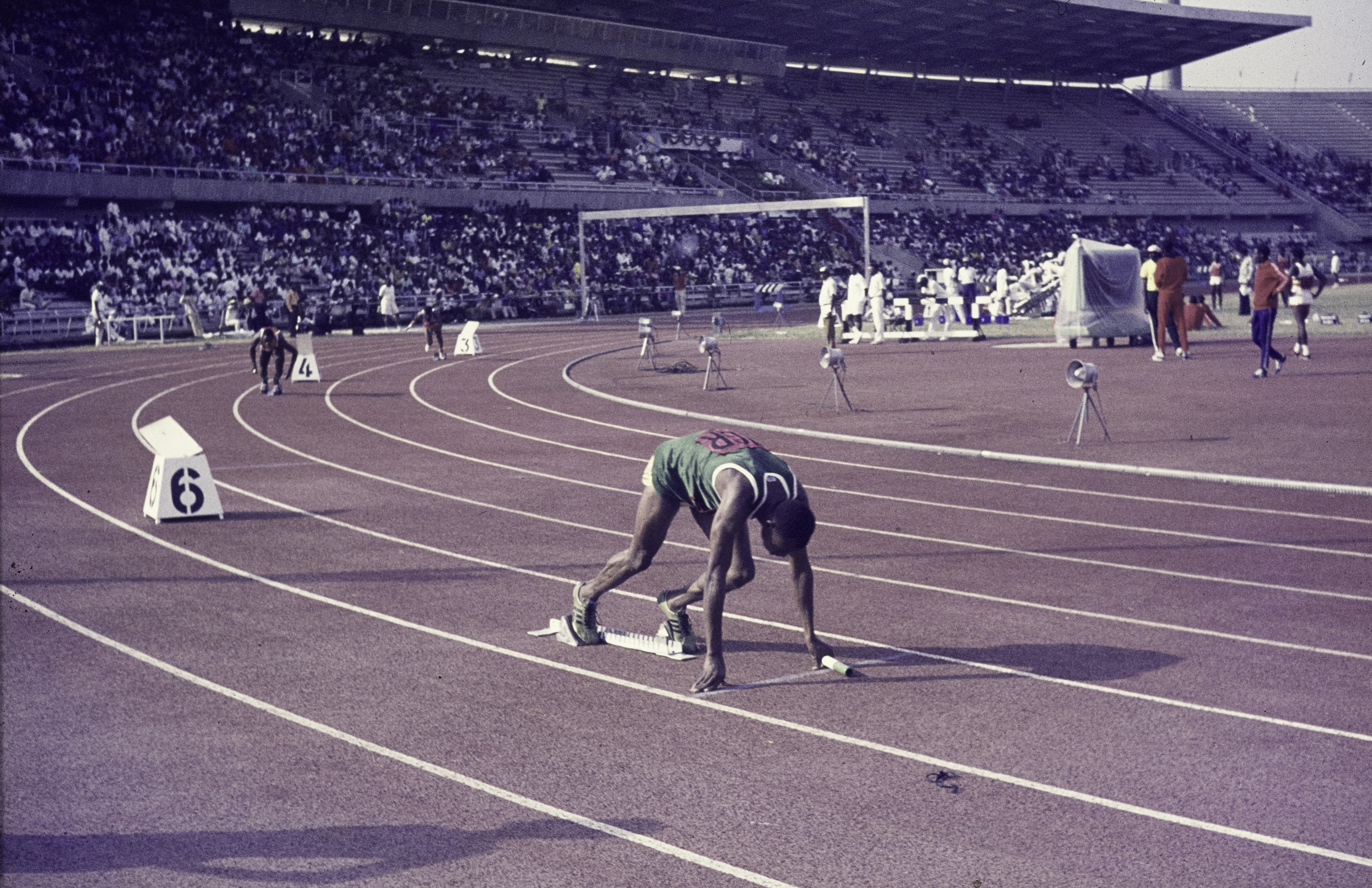
Running at the 1973 All-Africa Games

The second All-Africa Games were held in Lagos, Nigeria in January 1973.

Ten new events were added, three for the men, 10,000 metres, marathon and hammer throw and seven for the women, 200 metres, 400 metres, 800 metres, 1500 metres, shot put, discus throw and 4 × 400 metres relay. Also the women's hurdles were changed from the 80 metre hurdles to the 100 metre hurdles as had happened across the world.

Five nations won medals for the first time these being Somalia, Algeria, Gambia, Togo and Swaziland while both Egypt and PR Congo won medals under new names.

Only one athlete defended his title from the 1965 Games, namely Malian discus thrower Namakoro Niaré. Four track and field athletes, two male and two female, won more than one event:

- Ohene Karikari, Ghana (100 metres and 200 metres men)
- Alice Annum, Ghana (100 metres and 200 metres women)
- Modupe Oshikoya, Nigeria (high jump, long jump and 100m hurdles)
- Ben Jipcho, Kenya (5000 metres and steeplechase)

Several women's events was added. These were 200 metres, 400 metres, 800 metres, 1500 metres, discus throw, shot put and 4 × 400 metres relay.

- Nagui Asaad won his first gold medal in Shot Put of the All Africa Games, 1973, Nigeria, and then he went to win a second time in 1978, All-Africa Games Algeria, He also was the Silver medallist in Discus throw of the All Africa Games, 1973

== Medal summary ==
=== Men's events ===
| Event | Gold | | Silver | | Bronze | |
|---|---|---|---|---|---|---|
| 100 metres | Ohene Karikari; Ghana | 10.60 | Barka Sy; Senegal | 10.67 | John Mwebi; Kenya | 10.76 |
| 200 metres (wind: +0.1 m/s) | Ohene Karikari; Ghana | 21.13 GR | George Daniels; Ghana | 21.32 | John Mwebi; Kenya | 21.53 |
| 400 metres | Charles Asati; Kenya | 46.31 GR | Telegne Bezabeh; Ethiopia | 46.8 | Mulugetta Tadesse; Ethiopia | 47.17 |
| 800 metres | Cosmas Silei; Kenya | 1:45.38 GR | John Kipkurgat; Kenya | 1:47.29 | Sid Ali Djouadi; Algeria | 1:48.70 |
| 1500 metres | Filbert Bayi; Tanzania | 3:37.23 GR | Kip Keino; Kenya | 3:39.63 | Shibru Regassa; Ethiopia | 3:40.04 |
| 5000 metres | Ben Jipcho; Kenya | 14:07.21 | Miruts Yifter; Ethiopia | 14:07.57 | Paul Mose; Kenya | 14:08.43 |
| 10,000 metres | Miruts Yifter; Ethiopia | 29:04.6 | Paul Mose; Kenya | 29:50.8 | Richard Juma; Kenya | 29:24.3 |
| Marathon | Mamo Wolde; Ethiopia | 2:17:33 | Lenyissa Bedame; Ethiopia | 2:18:16 | Richard Mabuza; Swaziland | 2:34:18 |
| 3000 metre steeplechase | Ben Jipcho; Kenya | 8:20.74 GR | Evans Mogaka; Kenya | 8:26.11 | Yohannes Mohamed; Ethiopia | 8:32.86 |
| 110 metres hurdles | Fatwell Kimaiyo; Kenya | 14.19 GR | Aboyade Cole; Nigeria | 14.54 | Abdoulaye Sarr; Senegal | 14.56 |
| 400 metres hurdles | John Akii-Bua; Uganda | 48.54 GR | William Koskei; Kenya | 50.22 | Silver Ayoo; Uganda | 50.25 |
| 4 × 100 metres relay | Nigeria; Benedict Majekodunmi; Kola Abdulai; James Olakunle; Timon Oyebami | 39.89 GR | Ghana; Ohene Karikari; George Daniels; Kofi Okyir; Albert Lomotey | 40.01 | Ivory Coast; Koukau Komenan; Amadou Meïté; Gaoussou Koné; Kouami N'Dri | 40.23 |
| 4 × 400 metres relay | Kenya; Munyoro Nyamau ? Bill Koskei; Charles Asati | 3:06.38 GR | Nigeria; Mousa Dogon Yaro; Bruce Ijirighwo; Mamman Makama; Robert Ojo | 3:06.98 | Uganda; Remy Okida; Daniel Oboth; Silver Ayoo; John Akii-Bua | 3:07.21 |
| High jump | Abdulle Noor Wasughe; Somalia | 2.04 | Sheikh Tidiane Faye; Gambia | 2.04 | Ahmadou Evélé; Cameroon | 2.00 |
| Pole vault | Mohamed Alaa Ghita; Egypt | 4.25 | Lakhdar Rahal; Algeria | 4.20 | Jean-Prosper Tsondzabéka; Congo | 4.20 |
| Long jump | Joshua Owusu; Ghana | 8.00w | John Okoro; Nigeria | 7.83 | Mansour Dia; Senegal | 7.71 |
| Triple jump | Mansour Dia; Senegal | 16.53 GR | Abraham Munabi; Uganda | 16.26 (NR) | Moise Pomaney; Ghana | 16.09 |
| Shot put | Youssef Nagui Asaad; Egypt | 19.48 GR | Namakoro Niaré; Mali | 16.81 | Jean-Marie Djebaili; Algeria | 16.63 |
| Discus throw | Namakoro Niaré; Mali | 55.28 GR | Youssef Nagui Asaad; Egypt | 53.60 | Denis Ségui Kragbé; Ivory Coast | 52.12 |
| Hammer throw | Yovan Ochola; Uganda | 50.64 | Gabriel Luzira; Uganda | 49.86 | Seifullah Negmeddin Shaheen; Egypt | 47.58 |
| Javelin throw | Jacques Ayé Abehi; Ivory Coast | 77.22 GR | John Mayaka; Kenya | 71.08 | François Ganongo; Congo | 69.26 |

=== Women's events ===
| Event | Gold | | Silver | | Bronze | |
|---|---|---|---|---|---|---|
| 100 metres | Alice Anum; Ghana | 11.77 | Rose Asiedua; Ghana | 11.93 | Utifon Ufon Oko; Nigeria | 12.06 |
| 200 metres | Alice Anum; Ghana | 23.88 | Beatrice Ewuzie; Nigeria | 24.78 | Josephine Ocran; Ghana | 24.82 |
| 400 metres | Tekla Chemabwai; Kenya | 54.06 | Grace Bakari; Ghana | 55.63 | Florence Mgbakwe; Nigeria | 56.08 |
| 800 metres | Christine Anyakun; Uganda | 2:09.5 | Rosalind Joshua; Nigeria | 2:10.7 | Helena Opoku; Ghana | 2:11.7 |
| 1500 metres | Peace Kesiime; Uganda | 4:38.7 | Mary Wagaki; Kenya | 4:38.8 | Ruth Yeboah; Ghana | 4:42.3 |
| 100 metres hurdles | Modupe Oshikoya; Nigeria | 14.28 | Emilia Edet; Nigeria | 14.48 | Budesia Nyakecho; Uganda | 15.29 |
| 4 × 100 metres relay | Ghana ? Rose Asiedua; Josephine Ocran; Alice Annum | 46.25 | Nigeria ? ? Ashanti Obi; Utifon Ufon Oko | 46.58 | Kenya; Tekla Chemabwai; Alice Adala; Emily Kubasu; Reboy James | 48.53 |
| 4 × 400 metres relay | Uganda | 3:45.42 | Nigeria | 3:45.69 | Kenya | 3:46.06 |
| High jump | Modupe Oshikoya; Nigeria | 1.71 | Agnes Aghagba; Nigeria | 1.69 | Magdalena Chesire; Kenya | 1.60 |
| Long jump | Modupe Oshikoya; Nigeria | 6.16 | Margaret Odafin; Nigeria | 6.07 | Christine Kabanda; Uganda | 5.73 |
| Shot put | Evelyn Okeke; Nigeria | 13.59 | Nnenna Njoku; Nigeria | 12.39 | Brigitte Goze; Ivory Coast | 11.90 |
| Discus throw | Rose Hart; Ghana | 41.06 | Adobi Okoli; Nigeria | 40.82 | Albestine de Zouza; Togo | 38.20 |
| Javelin throw | Constance Rwabiryagye; Uganda | 47.50 | Lilian Cherotich; Kenya | 41.94 | Angelina Chekpiyeng; Kenya | 39.12 |

== Medal table ==
| Rank | Nation | Gold | Silver | Bronze | Total |
|---|---|---|---|---|---|
| 1 | Kenya | 7 | 8 | 8 | 23 |
| 2 | Ghana | 7 | 4 | 4 | 15 |
| 3 | Uganda | 6 | 2 | 4 | 12 |
| 4 | Nigeria | 5 | 12 | 2 | 19 |
| 5 | Ethiopia | 2 | 3 | 3 | 8 |
| 6 | Egypt | 2 | 1 | 1 | 4 |
| 7 | Senegal | 1 | 1 | 2 | 4 |
| 8 | Mali | 1 | 1 | 0 | 2 |
| 9 | Ivory Coast | 1 | 0 | 3 | 4 |
| 10 | Somalia | 1 | 0 | 0 | 1 |
| 10 | Tanzania | 1 | 0 | 0 | 1 |
| 12 | Algeria | 0 | 1 | 2 | 3 |
| 13 | Gambia | 0 | 1 | 0 | 1 |
| 14 | Congo | 0 | 0 | 2 | 2 |
| 15 | Cameroon | 0 | 0 | 1 | 1 |
| 15 | (Eswatini) Swaziland | 0 | 0 | 1 | 1 |
| 15 | Togo | 0 | 0 | 1 | 1 |
| Totals (17 entries) | | 34 | 34 | 34 | 102 |
