= Keino =

Keino is a surname of Kenyan origin that may refer to:

- Joseph Keino (born 1963), Kenyan half marathon runner
- Kipchoge Keino (born 1940), Kenyan distance runner and two-time Olympic champion
- Moses Kiprono arap Keino (1937–1998), Kenyan politician and Speaker of the Parliament of Kenya
- Phyllis Keino, Kenyan nurse and philanthropist
