= Athletics at the 1966 British Empire and Commonwealth Games – Men's 1 mile =

Men's 1 mile at the 1966 British Empire and Commonwealth Games
- Venue: Independence Park, Kingston
- Dates: August 11 and 13, 1966

Medalists
gold medal	Kip Keino	Kenya
silver medal	Alan Simpson	England
bronze medal	Ian Studd	New Zealand

The men's 1 mile event at the 1966 British Empire and Commonwealth Games was held on 11 and 13 August at the Independence Park in Kingston, Jamaica. It was the last time that the imperial distance was contested at the Games, being replaced subsequently by the 1500 metres, until its return in the 2026 Commonwealth Games in Glasgow.

== Medalists ==
Medallists
Gold	Silver	Bronze
Kip Keino; Kenya	Alan Simpson; England	Ian Studd; New Zealand

== Results ==
=== Heats ===
Qualification: First 4 in each heat (Q) qualify directly for the final.

Heats results. See the qualification criteria
Rank	Heat	Name	Nationality	Time	Notes
1	1	Kip Keino	Kenya	3:57.4	Q
2	1	Walter Wilkinson	England	4:05.7	Q
3	1	Keith Wheeler	Australia	4:07.77	Q
4	1	Ian Studd	New Zealand	4:09.5	Q
5	1	Pascal Mfyomi	Tanzania	4:10.2	
6	1	John Linaker	Scotland	4:14.5	
7	1	Yvo Labonte	Mauritius	4:33.2	
	1	Robert Lightburn	British Honduras	DNS	
	1	John Boulter	England	DNS	
	1	Mohamed Ismail	Aden	DNS	
1	2	Ergas Leps	Canada	4:09.1	Q
2	2	Derek Graham	Northern Ireland	4:09.4	Q
3	2	Kerry O'Brien	Australia	4:09.84	Q
4	2	Graeme Grant	Scotland	4:10.1	Q
5	2	Neill Duggan	England	4:10.2	
6	2	Earl Belcher	Jamaica	4:13.8	
7	2	Franklin Rahming	Bahamas	4:34.2	
	2	Ron Clarke	Australia	DNS	
	2	Charles Harewood	Barbados	DNS	
	2	Allieu Massaquoi	Sierra Leone	DNS	
	2	Lennox Yearwood	Trinidad and Tobago	DNS	
1	3	Alan Simpson	England	4:02.5	Q
2	3	Ralph Doubell	Australia	4:04.0	Q
3	3	Arthur Pyne	New Zealand	4:04.5	Q
4	3	Robert Rwakojo	Uganda	4:04.7	Q
5	3	Edward Sequeira	India	4:07.0	
6	3	Dave Bailey	Canada	4:12.2	
7	3	Ramsay Subramaniam	Malaysia	4:16.6	
8	3	Tony Harris	Wales	4:24.6	
9	3	Frederick Sowerby	Antigua and Barbuda	5:08.0	
	3	Derek Cambridge	Bahamas	DNS	
	3	Benedict Cayenne	Trinidad and Tobago	DNS	
	3	Omari Abdallah	Tanzania	DNS	

=== Final ===
Final results: GR means Games Record
Rank	Name	Nationality	Time	Notes
1st place, gold medalist(s)	Kip Keino	Kenya	3:55.34	GR
2nd place, silver medalist(s)	Alan Simpson	England	3:57.27	
3rd place, bronze medalist(s)	Ian Studd	New Zealand	3:58.61	
4	Walter Wilkinson	England	3:59.3	
5	Derek Graham	Northern Ireland	3:59.4	
6	Keith Wheeler	Australia	3:59.81	
7	Ergas Leps	Canada	4:01.0	
8	Kerry O'Brien	Australia	4:02.72	
9	Robert Rwakojo	Uganda	4:03.0	
10	Arthur Pyne	New Zealand	4:03.2	
	Ralph Doubell	Australia	DNF	
	Graeme Grant	Scotland	DNF	
