= Alice Annum =

Ghanaian sprinter (born 1948)

Personal information
- Nickname: Baby Jet
- Nationality: Ghanaian
- Born: 20 October 1948 (age 77) Accra

Sport
- Country: Ghana
- Sport: Track and Field
- Events: 100m, 200m, 4x100m Long jump
- College team: Tennessee

Achievements and titles
- Personal best: 200 m: 22.9 sec (Christchurch, 1974)
Medal record
Women's athletics
Representing Ghana
Commonwealth Games
Bronze medal – third place	1974 Christchurch	200 m
Silver medal – second place	1970 Edinburgh	100 m
Silver medal – second place	1970 Edinburgh	200 m
All-Africa Games
Gold medal – first place	1973 Lagos	100 m
Gold medal – first place	1973 Lagos	200 m
Gold medal – first place	1965 Brazzaville	Long jump

Alice Annum alias "Baby Jet" (born 20 October 1948 in Accra) is a retired Ghanaian sprinter. Her personal best time in the 200 metres was 22.89 seconds, achieved at the 1972 Olympic Games in Munich. She was the first woman to represent Ghana at the Olympics. Alice later participated in the 1964 Olympics held in Tokyo, 1968 in Mexico and the 1972 Olympics held in Munich.

Annum was one of many athletes through the defunct National Sports Festivals organised annually in Ghana. She benefited from the sponsorship of Ghanaian athletes by the United States and competed for the University of Tennessee. She competed in the 1964 Olympic Games but did not advance past the preliminary stages in the long jump, placing 28th with a best jump of 5.45 metres.

In 1970, she won silver at the Commonwealth Games in both 100 m and 200 m. She was honoured in 2010 for her achievements in sports by the Action Progressive Institute in Ghana.

== Personal life ==
Alice has 3 children.

== International competitions ==
Year	Competition	Venue	Position	Event	Notes
1965	All-Africa Games	Brazzaville, Congo	1st	Long jump	
1970	British Commonwealth Games	Edinburgh, Scotland	2nd	100 m	
1970	British Commonwealth Games	Edinburgh, Scotland	2nd	200 m	
1972	Olympic Games	Munich, Germany	6th	100 m	
1972	Olympic Games	Munich, Germany	7th	200 m	
1973	All-Africa Games	Lagos, Nigeria	1st	100 m	
1973	All-Africa Games	Lagos, Nigeria	1st	200 m	
1974	British Commonwealth Games	Christchurch, New Zealand	3rd	200 m	
