= Habiba Atta Forson =

Ghanaian football administrator

Personal information
- Full name: Habiba Atta Forson
- Nationality: Ghanaian
- Born: Kumasi, Ghana

Sport
- Country: Ghana
- Sport: High jump 4 × 100 metres relay 100 metres
- Event: Women's 1.84m
Medal record
Women's athletics
Representing Ghana
Silver medal – second place	1965 Brazzaville	Triple jump

Habiba Atta Forson (born 18 August) is a Ghanaian veteran football administrator and a former track and field athlete for Ghana. On 24 October 2019, she contested and won a slot to serve on the Executive Council of the Ghana Football Association, making her the only woman currently serving on the Ghana Football Association's executive council. She is known for being the first person to introduce women's football in Ghana.

She is also the founder of Fabulous Ladies, one of the popular women football team in Ghana.

== Early life ==
Forson started her basic school education at Yaa Achiaa Girls Basic in Kumasi, where she started developing the love for sports. She proceeded to T.I. Ahmadiyya Senior High School, Kumasi where she continued to nurture and develop her skill in high jump and other field events. Whilst in school she represented Ashanti Region during National Sports Festivals where excelled by winning medals in high Jump, shot put, javelin throw and 4 × 100 metres relay events.

== Career ==
=== Athletics ===
In 1965, during the first All-Africa Games held in Congo Brazzaville, she was part of the Ghana's track and field athlete team and won silver in the high jump contest. She was also a member of the team that also won silver in 4 × 100 metres relay.

Between 1962 and 1965, Forson made a huge impact in track and field when she won the national high jump championship consecutively and set a national record in 1963 - a record which stayed intact for five years before it was broken. In 1977, she won the regional tennis championship at which point in time she had bowed out from active athletics competitions.

=== Football administration ===
Forson was a staff and coach at Kumasi Secondary Technical College (KISCO). She is known for her instrumental role in transforming players like Frimpong Manso from a striker into a defender and George Kennedy to become a lethal striker on the local scene. Frimpong Manso went on to play for Asante Kotoko and Ghana national team.

In 1985, Forson started Ghana Women's Premier League side Fabulous Ladies, with the name Ashtown Ladies. She vied for position on a position on Ghana Football Association executive committee via the sole Constituent Bodies slot on two occasions but lost to Leanier Addy. However, in October 2019, she was won a slot on the executive committee via the newly created women's football slot. She polled eight of the 16 available votes edging her closest challenger Evelyn Nsiah Asare by a solitary vote. One of her tasks as the women's representative was to work along with Naa Odofoley Nortey to come up with a comprehensive policy document on women's football, with focus on improving visibility, packaging and branding.

In 2020, she was appointed as the Black Queens management committee chairperson, retaining the position also in 2021. Prior to that, she has served on the committee as a member for several years. She also headed and worked as a member of several other sports committees including working Ashanti Regional Women's League and juveniles committees. In December 2019, she was appointed as the head of Ghana Women's FA Cup Committee retaining that position also in 2021.

She is also a former management member of Kumasi Asante Kotoko.

== Personal life ==
Forson has six children.

== Honours ==
In June 2021, during the 2021 Ghana Football Awards, Forson was honoured with the Special Achievement Award for her immense contribution to Ghana football and specifically women's football in Ghana.
