= Athletics at the 1970 British Commonwealth Games – Men's high jump =

Men's high jump at the 1970 British Commonwealth Games
- Venue: Meadowbank Stadium, Edinburgh
- Dates: 17 and 18 July 1970

Medalists
| gold medal | Lawrie Peckham | Australia |
| silver medal | John Hawkins | Canada |
| bronze medal | Sheikh Faye | The Gambia |

The men's high jump event at the 1970 British Commonwealth Games was held on 17 and 18 July at the Meadowbank Stadium in Edinburgh, Scotland.

== Medallists ==
Medallists
| Gold | Silver | Bronze |
|---|---|---|
| Lawrie Peckham; Australia | John Hawkins; Canada | Sheikh Faye; Gambia |

== Results ==
=== Qualification ===
Athletes eliminated before final
| Rank | Name | Nationality | Height | Notes |
|---|---|---|---|---|
| 13 | Crawford Fairbrother | Scotland | 1.93 | |
| 13 | Phil Taylor | England | 1.93 | |
| 15 | Cosmos Julien | Mauritius | 1.83 | |
| 15 | Raymond Anthony | Grenada | 1.83 | |
| | Granville Buckley | Antigua and Barbuda | DNS | |
| | L. Turnquest | Bahamas | DNS | |

=== Final ===
Final results
| Rank | Name | Nationality | Height | Notes |
|---|---|---|---|---|
| 1st place, gold medalist(s) | Lawrie Peckham | Australia | 2.14 | |
| 2nd place, silver medalist(s) | John Hawkins | Canada | 2.12 | |
| 3rd place, bronze medalist(s) | Sheikh Faye | Gambia | 2.10 | |
| 4 | Bhim Singh | India | 2.06 | |
| 5 | Rick Cuttell | Canada | 2.06 | |
| 6 | Anthony Holbrook-Smith | Ghana | 2.06 | |
| 7 | David Wilson | Scotland | 2.04 | |
| 8 | Mike Campbell | England | 2.01 | |
| 9 | Nor Azhar Abdul Hamid | Singapore | 1.98 | |
| 10 | Leon Hall | England | 1.96 | |
| 11 | Samuel Igun | Nigeria | 1.96 | |
| 12 | Henry Jackson | Jamaica | 1.88 | |
