= Francis Musyoki =

Kenyan athlete

Personal information
- Born: Francis Musyoki Kamba; 1953 (age 72–73)

Sport
- Sport: Athletics
- Event: 400 metres
Medal record
Representing Kenya
All-Africa Games
Gold medal – first place	1973 Lagos	4 × 400 m relay
British Commonwealth Games
Gold medal – first place	1974 Christchurch	4 × 400 m relay

Francis Musyoki Kamba (born 1953) is a Kenyan former athlete.

Active in the 1970s, Musyoki was a sprinter who specialised in the 400 metres and competed locally for the General Service Unit. He was a member of gold medal-winning Kenyan 4 × 400 m relay teams at the 1973 All-Africa Games in Lagos and 1974 British Commonwealth Games in Christchurch.

Musyoki lives in Itangini, Makueni County and is a farmer.
