= John Linaker =

John Linaker may refer to:

- Johnny Linaker (1927–2013), English footballer
- John Linaker (runner) (born 1939), Scottish middle-distance runner
