= Erinle (surname) =

Erinle is a surname. Notable people with the surname include:

- Ayoola Erinle (born 1980), English rugby union player
- Folu Erinle (born 1940), Nigerian hurdler
- Titus Erinle (1927–?), Nigerian sprinter
