= Leon Hall (high jumper) =

British high jumper

Personal information
- Nationality: British (English)
- Born: c.1945 England

Sport
- Sport: Athletics
- Event: High jump
- Club: Polytechnic Harriers

Leon Hall (born c.1945) is a former international high jumper who competed at the Commonwealth Games.

== Biography ==
Hall studied at the University of Oxford. He was a member of the Polytechnic Harriers and specialised in the high jump.

He twice finished on the medal podium at the AAA Indoor Championships in 1967 and 1970 and won the Southern Counties title in 1968.

Hall represented the England team at the 1970 British Commonwealth Games in Edinburgh, Scotland, where he competed in the men's high jump event, reaching the final.
