= Phil Taylor (high jumper) =

British high jumper

Personal information
- Nationality: British (English)
- Born: c.1949 England

Sport
- Sport: Athletics
- Event: High jump
- Club: Liverpool University AC; Liverpool Harriers

Philip Taylor (born c.1949) is a former international high jumper who competed at the Commonwealth Games.

== Biography ==
Taylor studied law at the University of Liverpool and was a member of the Liverpool University Athletics Club, specialising in the high jump. At the 1970 Universities Championshionship in Durham, he set a new student record of 6 feet, 10.25 inches. After University he competed for the Liverpool Harriers and jumped for Cheshire at county level.

He twice finished on the medal podium at the AAA Indoor Championships in 1968 and 1971

Taylor represented the England team at the 1970 British Commonwealth Games in Edinburgh, Scotland, where he competed in the men's high jump event.
