= Ian Studd =

New Zealand middle-distance runner

Medal record

Men's Athletics

Representing New Zealand

Commonwealth Games
Bronze medal – third place	1966 Kingston	Mile

Ian Spurgeon Studd (born 1943) is a former middle-distance runner from New Zealand.

In 1966, Studd competed at the British Empire and Commonwealth Games in Kingston, Jamaica, winning the bronze medal in the men's mile.
