= Amadou Gakou =

Senegalese sprinter

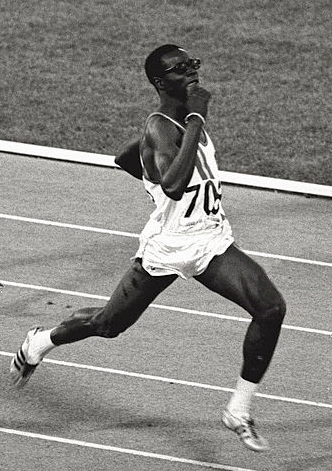
- Amadou Gakou at the 1968 Olympics

Personal information
- Born: 25 March 1940 (age 86) Dakar, Senegal
- Height: 1.75 m (5 ft 9 in)
- Weight: 69 kg (152 lb)

Sport
- Sport: Sprint running

Achievements and titles
- Personal best: 400 m – 45.01 (1968)
Medal record
Representing Senegal
All-Africa Games
Bronze medal – third place	1965 Brazzaville	400 m

Amadou Gakou (born 25 March 1940) is a retired Senegalese sprinter. He competed in the 400 m event at the 1964, 1968 and 1972 Olympics with the best achievement of fourth place in 1968, setting a national record at 45.01 seconds. He won a silver medal at the 1965 All-Africa Games.

His sister is the grandmother of 400 metres runner Fatou Bintou Fall.
