= Christine Anyakun =

Ugandan middle-distance runner

Sport
- Sport: Athletics
- Event: 800 metres

Achievements and titles
- Personal best: 800 m: 2:09.48
Medal record
Representing Uganda
African Games
Gold medal – first place	1973 Lagos	800 m

Christine "Christie" Anyakun is a retired Ugandan middle-distance runner. She won the gold medal in the 800 metres at the 1973 All-Africa Games in Lagos, the first time the 800 m was contested at the All-Africa Games. She was also the winner of the 1972 East African Championships in the women's 800m.

In 1971, Anyakun traveled to Duke University to compete in the inaugural (and only) Pan Africa-USA International Track Meet, which pitted Africa against America in a team-based scoring event for charity. She finished last in her 800m final in a time of 2:24.43.

Anyakun was a member of the Uganda National Police as part of the Uganda Prisons Service.
