= Amelia Okoli =

Nigerian high jumper

Personal information
- Born: 14 May 1941
- Died: 1 November 2017 (aged 76) America
Medal record
Women's Athletics
Representing Nigeria
All-Africa Games
Gold medal – first place	1965 Brazzaville	High Jump

Amelia Okoli-Okpalaoka (14 May 1941 – 1 November 2017) was a female track and field athlete from Nigeria. She specialised in the high jump event during her career. Okoli represented Nigeria at the 1964 Olympic Games. She claimed a gold medal for her native West African country at the 1965 All-Africa Games. Okoli finished tenth in the 1958 British Empire and Commonwealth Games high jump.
