= Neill Duggan =

English athlete

Personal information
- Nationality: British (English)
- Born: 1 September 1940 Loughborough, England

Sport
- Sport: Athletics
- Event: Middle-distance
- Club: Sparkhill Harriers, Birmingham

Thomas Neill Duggan (born 1 September 1940), is a male former athlete who competed for England.

== Biography ==
Duggan was selected by England to represent his country in athletics events.

He represented the England team at the 1966 British Empire and Commonwealth Games in Kingston, Jamaica, in the 1 mile event.

He was a member of the Sparkhill Harriers Athletics Club in Birmingham. He held a scholarship at Allan Hancock College, California and set a United States national junior college mile record of 4 min. 2.7 sec.

He also holds fast times on the all time UK list for 1500 metres and 1 mile. (3:41.6 and 3:56.1) respectively.
