= Modupe Oshikoya =

Nigerian athlete

Personal information
- Born: 2 May 1954 (age 72) Lagos, Nigeria
- Education: Methodist Girls' High School, Yaba, Lagos, Nigeria
Medal record
Women's athletics
Representing Nigeria
Commonwealth Games
Gold medal – first place	1974 Christchurch	Long jump
Silver medal – second place	1974 Christchurch	Pentathlon
Bronze medal – third place	1974 Christchurch	100m hurdles
All-Africa Games
Gold medal – first place	1973 Lagos	100 m hurdles
Gold medal – first place	1973 Lagos	High jump
Gold medal – first place	1973 Lagos	Long jump
Gold medal – first place	1978 Algiers	High jump
Gold medal – first place	1978 Algiers	Long jump

Modupe Oshikoya (born 2 May 1954) is a former female track and field athlete from Nigeria, who competed in the women's sprint and long jump events during her career. She is a one-time Olympian (1972), and also competed in the heptathlon. Oshikoya won a total number of five gold medals at the All-Africa Games (1973 and 1978). Oshikoya competed and won Gold for her University in the US, UCLA in the 100 meters, the Long Jump, 100 meters hurdles and the hepthatlon at the NCAA championships in 1982.
