= Ben Jipcho =

Kenyan athlete (1943–2020)

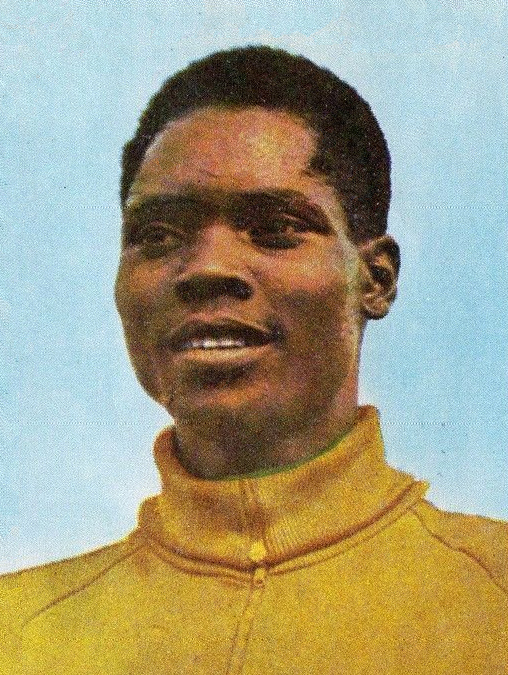
- Jipcho in 1972

Personal information
- Full name: Benjamin Wabura Jipcho
- Born: 1 March 1943 Mount Elgon District, Western Province, Kenya
- Died: 24 July 2020 (aged 77) Eldoret, Kenya
- Height: 1.70 m (5 ft 7 in)
- Weight: 71 kg (157 lb)

Sport
- Sport: Athletics
- Event: 1500-5000 m

Achievements and titles
- Personal bests: 1500 m – 3:33.16 (1974); 5000 m – 13:14.3 (1974); 3000 m – 8:13.91 (1973)
Medal record
Olympic Games
Representing Kenya
Silver medal – second place	1972 Munich	3000 m steeplechase
Commonwealth Games
Gold medal – first place	1974 Christchurch	5000 m
Gold medal – first place	1974 Christchurch	3000 m steeplechase
Bronze medal – third place	1974 Christchurch	1500 m
All-Africa Games
Gold medal – first place	1973 Lagos	5000 m
Gold medal – first place	1973 Lagos	3000 m steeplechase

Benjamin Wabura Jipcho (1 March 1943 – 24 July 2020) was a track and field athlete from Kenya who won the silver medal in the 3000 metres steeplechase at the 1972 Summer Olympics.

Jipcho won the silver medal in the 3000m steeplechase at the 1970 Commonwealth Games held in Edinburgh, Scotland ahead of fellow Kenyan and Olympic champion, Amos Biwott. Jipcho won the 5000 m at the 1973 All-Africa Games. He also won the gold medal in the 5000 m and 3000 m steeplechase and the bronze medal in the 1500 metres at the 1974 Commonwealth Games in Christchurch, New Zealand.

He played a role in team-mate Kip Keino's victory over Jim Ryun in the high altitude 1968 Summer Olympics in Mexico City. Sacrificing his own chances for a medal to team tactics, Jipcho pulled Keino through a 56-second first 400 metres, before being passed by his teammate with 800 metres to go and drifting back into the pack. By that point, Keino had established a lead of 20 metres or more, which Ryun's famous finishing speed could not erase. Jipcho later apologized to Ryun for acting as Keino's rabbit.

He was later quoted:

"Running for money doesn't make you run fast. It makes you run first."

His granddaughter Esther Chemutai is also a runner, while he was a distant uncle to the siblings Linet Masai and Moses Masai.

Jipcho died of cancer in Fountain Hospital in Eldoret, Kenya.

Records
Preceded by (Sweden) Anders Gärderud	Men's 3000 m steeplechase world record holder 15 January 1973 – 25 June 1975	Succeeded by (Sweden) Anders Gärderud
Awards
Preceded by (Finland) Lasse Virén	Track & Field Athlete of the Year; 1973	Succeeded by (United States) Rick Wohlhuter
Sporting positions
Preceded by (Belgium) Emiel Puttemans	Men's 5000 m best year performance 1974	Succeeded by (Belgium) Emiel Puttemans
Preceded by (Sweden) Anders Gärderud	Men's 3000 m steeplechase best year performance 1973	Succeeded by (Sweden) Anders Gärderud
