= Leanier Addy =

Ghanaian sports executive

Chairperson of the Ghana Women's League Board
- In office 2012–2018
- President: Kwesi Nyantakyi
- Succeeded by: Habiba Atta Forson

Personal details
- Born: Leanier Afiyea-Obo Addy Ghana
- Occupation: Sports Executive and Administrator

Leanier Afiyea-Obo Addy is a Ghanaian association football executive and administrator. She previously served as the Chairperson of the Ghana Women's League Board and as head of the women football in the country. She also served on the Ghana Football Association Executive Committee, making her the first female to do so.

== Career ==
Addy served as the Chairperson of the Ghana Women's League Board. She also served as the Ghana Football Association (GFA) Executive Committee Member for eight years. She was first voted unto the executive committee in 2010 after pulling five votes from the total ballot cast of eight, to win the sole slot via the Constituent Bodies on the executive committee. She beat off competition from Habiba Atta Forson who pulled two votes and Sylvester Twintoh Mensah who also had one vote. That made her the first female to serve on the executive committee. In 2015, she was reelected unto the committee via the Constituent Bodies slot for another 4-year term. She pulled 6 votes to beat Habiba Atta Forson again who got 2 out of a total of 8 votes cast.

The Constituent bodies were Women's Football, the Referees’ Association of Ghana, the Security Services, School and Colleges, Coaches Association, Players, Juvenile Football and University Sports. Addy also worked at Social Security and National Insurance Trust (SSNIT). In 2017, she showed interest in standing for the GFA President role after Kwesi Nyantakyi declared that he would not running in the next elections in 2019. She also served the chairperson of the Black Queens, the Ghana women's national football team and was a member of the local organizing committee of the 2018 Africa Women Cup of Nations which was held in Ghana.

== Controversies ==
In June 2018, Addy was involved in a corruption controversy, after she was caught on camera during the premiering of the Number 12: When Greed and Corruption Become the Norm an undercover investigation documentary by Anas Aremeyaw Anas taking an amount of Gh¢ 300 to supposedly manipulate an MTN FA Cup match between Accra Hearts of Oak and second-tier side Kotoku Royals. The incident happened in 2017, when a Tiger Eye P. I. agent posed himself as a team official and offered her the money when allegedly discharging her duties as a Match Commissioner. Later on 21 May 2017, Hearts of Oak managed to beat Kotoku Royals by 4–0 which helped them to progress to the quarters of the MTN FA Cup.

After the allegations, the GFA was dissolved, automatically causing her to lose her roles on any GFA related board or committee.
