= Naftali Temu =

Kenyan long-distance runner (1945–2003)

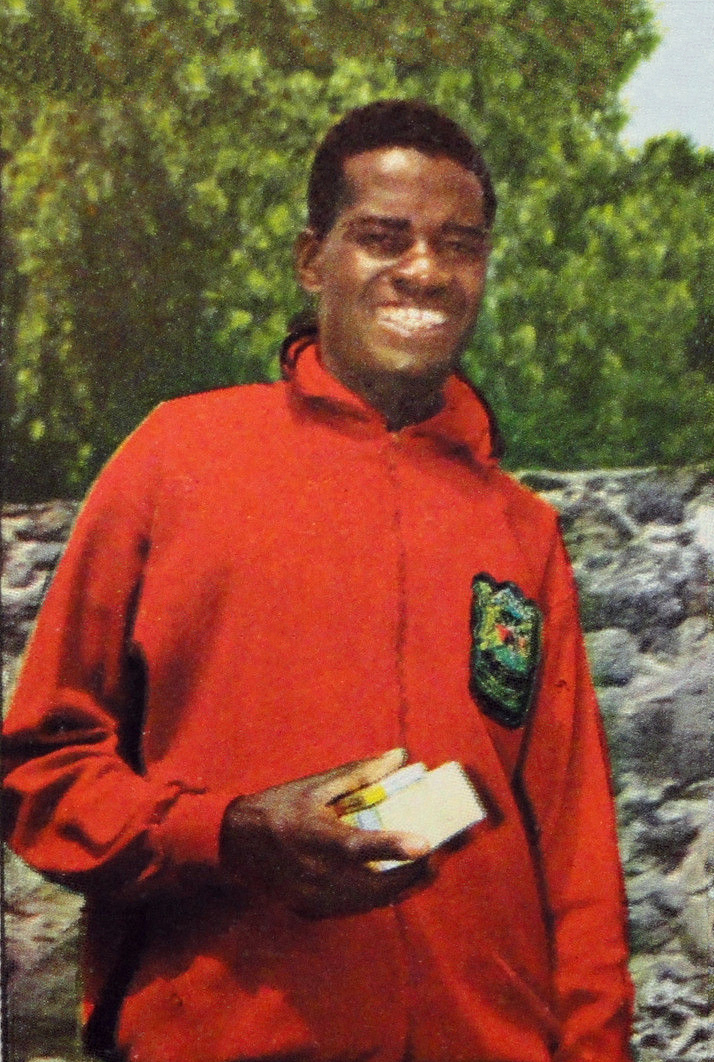
- Temu at the 1968 Summer Olympics

Personal information
- Nationality: Kenyan
- Born: Naftali Temu; 20 April 1945 Nyamira, Kenya
- Died: 10 March 2003 (aged 57) Nairobi, Kenya

Sport
- Sport: Athletics
- Events: 5000 m, 10,000 m

Achievements and titles
- Personal bests: 5000 m: 13:36.6; 10,000 m: 28:21.80
Medal record
Representing Kenya
Olympic Games
Gold medal – first place	1968 Mexico City	10000 m
Bronze medal – third place	1968 Mexico City	5000 m
All-Africa Games
Silver medal – second place	1965 Brazzaville	5000 m

Nabiba Naftali Temu (20 April 1945 – 10 March 2003) was a Kenyan long-distance runner. He became Kenya's first gold medalist when he won the 10,000 metres race at the 1968 Summer Olympics in Mexico City.

== Biography ==
Temu started systematic training in long-distance running at the age of 14. After completing school education, he served at the Kenyan Army. At the 1964 Olympics he was 49th in the marathon and failed to finish his 10,000 m race.

He won the silver medal in 5,000 m at the inaugural All-Africa Games in 1965, behind compatriot Kipchoge Keino. At the 1966 Commonwealth Games in Kingston, Jamaica, he beat the world record holder Ron Clarke to win the six mile race. Two days later, Temu finished fourth in the three miles.

At the Mexico Olympics, in the 10,000 m final, only Mamo Wolde from Ethiopia could keep to Temu's pace. Mamo Wolde went to lead at the bell, but Temu passed him with 50 m remaining to win the gold. Four days later, he won a bronze medal in the 5,000 m, narrowly beaten by Mohammed Gammoudi from Tunisia and fellow countryman Kipchoge Keino. Temu also competed against Mamo Wolde in the marathon, but Mamo Wolde broke away after the 30 km mark, while Temu finished 19th.

Temu's career went downhill after 1968. He finished nineteenth in the 10,000 m at the 1970 British Commonwealth Games, and was eliminated in the 10,000 m heats at the 1972 Summer Olympics. He retired in 1973 to run a farm in North Mugirango, which was a gift from president Jomo Kenyatta. On 10 March 2003, he died of prostate cancer at the Kenyatta National Hospital, aged 57.
