= Fabulous Ladies F.C. =

Football club in Ghana

- Full name: Fabulous Ladies Football Club
- Founded: 1985; 41 years ago as Ashtown Ladies F.C.
- Ground: Kumasi
- Owner: Habiba Atta Forson
- League: Ghana Women’s Premier League

Fabulous Ladies F.C. is a Ghanaian professional women's football club based in Kumasi in the Ashanti Region of Ghana. The club was formed by Habiba Atta Forson in 1985. The club is a founding member of the Ghana Women’s Premier League, the top level women's football league in Ghana and have been featuring in the league since 2012.

== History ==
The club was formed by Habiba Atta Forson in 1985, as the first female club in Ghana named Ashtown Ladies. In the 1990s after consulting the late Otumfuo Opoku Ware II the club was given the permission to use the Kotoko logo. The club was one twelve founding members of the inaugural Ghana Women’s Premier League in 2012. The club is based in the Northern Zone of the league.

== Notable players ==
For details on notable Fabulous Ladies F.C. footballers see Category:Fabulous Ladies F.C. players.
