= Mary Wagaki =

Kenyan long-distance runner

Personal information
- Nationality: Kenyan
- Born: 20 June 1954 (age 72)

Sport
- Sport: Long-distance running
- Event: Marathon

Mary Wagaki (born 20 June 1954) is a Kenyan long-distance runner. She competed in the women's marathon at the 1984 Summer Olympics. Wagaki won a silver medal in the 1500 metres at the 1973 All-Africa Games.
