= Graeme Grant =

Scottish athlete

Personal information
- Nationality: British (Scottish)
- Born: c.1946

Sport
- Sport: Athletics
- Event: Middle-distance
- Club: Dumbarton AAC

Graeme David Grant (born c.1946) is a former track and field athlete from Scotland who competed at the 1966 British Empire and Commonwealth Games (now Commonwealth Games).

== Biography ==
Grant was a member of the Dumbarton Amateur Athletic Club and a Scottish international middle-distance runner.

He won two 880 yards titles at the Scottish AAA Championship in 1965 and 1966.

Grant represented the Scottish Empire and Commonwealth Games team at the 1966 British Empire and Commonwealth Games in Kingston, Jamaica, participating in one event, the 1 mile race.
