= Edward Akika =

Nigerian hurdler and long jumper

Personal information
- Born: 18 July 1941 (age 84)
Medal record
Men's Athletics
Representing Nigeria
All-Africa Games
Gold medal – first place	1965 Brazzaville	Long Jump

Edward Akika (born 18 July 1941) is a retired Olympic track and field athlete from Nigeria. He specialised in the hurdling and the long jump events during his career.

Akika represented Nigeria at the 1964 Olympic Games. He claimed the gold medal for his native West African country in the men's long jump event at the 1965 All-Africa Games.
