= Phyllis Keino =

Kenyan philanthropist

Phyllis Keino is a Kenyan philanthropist known for her work with the Lewa Children's Home and the Baraka Farm, which serve orphaned and impoverished children in Eldoret, Kenya.

She was the wife of the Olympian runner Kip Keino with whom she founded the orphanage and farm. In addition to the work with the Lewa Children's House and the Baraka Farm, she serves as the volunteer spokesperson for the non-governmental organization Bread and Water for Africa.

== Life ==
Keino became a registered nurse in 1976 after several years of training, during which time she became committed to improving the lives of orphans and abandoned children living in poverty. In partnership with her husband Kip Keino, she undertook numerous humanitarian efforts including founding the Lewa Children's Home, Kazi Mingi Farm, Baraka Farm, and the Kipkeino schools in Eldoret.

In 1987, she organized with a Benedictine priest to secure funding to acquire 500 acres of land from the Craig family, members of the Lewa Conservatory, on which she could construct a home for orphans and children living in poverty.

In 2003, Phyllis and Kip had significant disagreements which led to their separation and a split between her humanitarian efforts and his foundations. She has given birth to eight children with Kip Keino and has adopted many others.

== Humanitarian work ==
Lewa Children's Home
Keino is the founder and director of the Lewa Children's Home in Eldoret which serves orphans from all over Kenya.

The home provides food, shelter, healthcare, education, clothing, and counseling regularly for over 80 children with three full-time caretakers in addition to Keino and her mother. In addition, over 190 children receive food, clothing and money for school fees through Lewa's home-base sponsorship program annually.

A 2014 profile estimated over 600 children have been housed at the orphanage since its creation. While Kip used his winnings to provide much of the initial funding, he credits Phyllis with maintaining the orphanage saying, "My wife is the one who has organized and made this work."

Kipkeino School
Keino is the founder and director of the Kipkeino Primary School which was founded in 1999 to provide education for the children in the Lewa Children's Home and the Eldoret area.

Baraka Farm
As part of her management of the orphanage, Phyllis is also the director of the Baraka Farm, founded in the mid-1990s, which provides food for the orphanage and the school as well as providing hands-on agricultural training for youth.

Bread and Water for Africa
Keino is the volunteer spokesperson for Bread and Water for Africa.

== Awards and honors ==
- Christian Relief Services Charities 20th Anniversary Gala Awards: Visionary Award. April 2006
- The International Alliance for Women - World of Difference 100 Award (Not for profit, NGO category), 25 October 2010.
