= Abdoulaye Sarr (athlete) =

Senegalese hurdler

Personal information
- Nationality: Senegalese
- Born: 9 December 1947 (age 78)

Sport
- Sport: Track and field
- Event: 110 metres hurdles

Abdoulaye Sarr (born 9 December 1947) is a Senegalese hurdler. He competed in the 110 metres hurdles at the 1972, 1976 and the 1980 Summer Olympics. Sarr won a bronze medal in the 110 metres hurdles at the 1973 All-Africa Games.
