= Ezzedin Yacoub Hamed =

Egyptian long jumper

Izz al-Din Yacoub is a retired Egyptian Long Jumper.

== Achievements ==
Year	Tournament	Venue	Result	Event
1965	All-Africa Games	Brazzaville, Republic of the Congo	2nd	Long Jump
1965	Pan Arab Games		1st	Long Jump

== See also ==
- Egyptian athletes
