= Sheikh Faye =

Gambian high and long jumper (1948–2013)

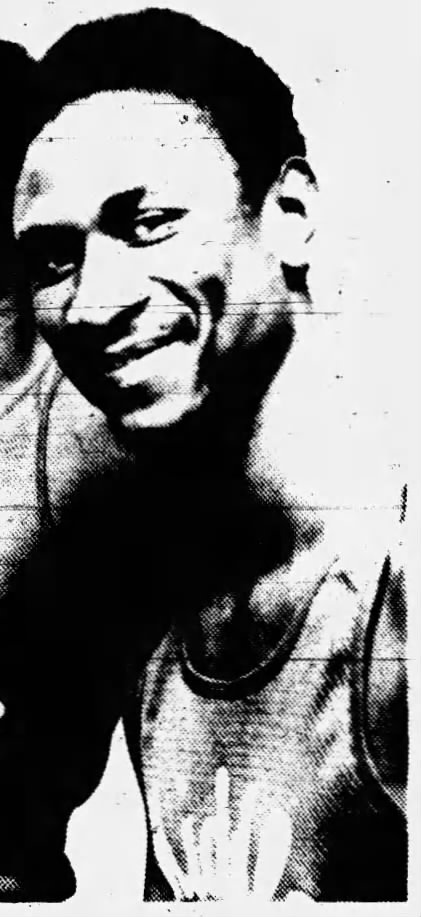
- Faye at Middle Tennessee State in 1976

Personal information
- Full name: Sheikh Tidiane Faye
- Born: 19 February 1948
- Died: 12 February 2013 (aged 64)
- Height: 195 cm (6 ft 5 in)
- Weight: 84 kg (185 lb)

Sport
- Country: Gambia
- Sport: Athletics
- Events: Long jump High jump
Medal record
Men's athletics
Representing the Gambia
Commonwealth Games
| Bronze medal – third place | 1970 Edinburgh | High jump |
African Games
| Silver medal – second place | 1973 Lagos | High jump |

Sheikh Tidiane Faye Sr. (Note: also spelled Cheikh Tidiane Faye or Sheikh Teejan Faye) (19 February 1948 – 12 February 2013) was a Gambian high jumper and long jumper. In the high jump, he won the first medal for the Gambia at the Commonwealth Games at their inaugural appearance, and later won a silver medal at the 1973 African Games. He was selected to Gambian teams for the 1972 and 1976 Olympics, but did not ultimately get to compete due to successive boycotts. Representing the Middle Tennessee Blue Raiders track and field team, he was the runner-up in the long jump at the 1976 NCAA Division I Outdoor Track and Field Championships.

== Career ==
Faye was introduced to the high jump in 1964 by an American Peace Corps coach in the Gambia. He went on to coach himself by reading books on the subject.

In July 1969, Faye set a 2.16 m high jump personal record to win a meet at Bathurst, Australia. The following year, he won a bronze medal at the 1970 Commonwealth Games high jump. It was the first ever Gambian medal at the Commonwealth Games, and remained their only medal in any sport until Faye Njie won a judo silver medal in 2022. Faye also finished 14th in the long jump and was a member of the Gambian 4 × 100 m team which was disqualified in their heat.

Faye was selected as the only member of the Gambia's 1972 Olympic team, and he trained in Germany in preparation. However, he did not compete due to an African-led boycott because Rhodesia was allowed to enter the Games.

In 1973, Faye won a silver medal in the high jump at the African Games behind Somalian winner Abdullah Noor Wasughe.

Faye returned to the 1974 Commonwealth Games where he finished 7th in the high jump final. He jumped a 2.18 m Gambian high jump record at a meet later that year in Banjul.

Faye competed representing Pan Africa at the 1975 U.S. Triangular meet in Durham, North Carolina, finishing 4th place in the high jump behind winner Wolfgang Killing. He also finished 3rd at the 1975 U.S.-Pan-Africa Meet at Baldwin Wallace University one week later.

Beginning in 1976, Faye was part of a Middle Tennessee State University squad of jumpers known as the "Grasshopper Gang". He excelled in the long jump, finishing 4th at the 1976 NCAA Indoor Track and Field Championships and runner-up behind Larry Myricks at the 1976 NCAA Division I Outdoor Track and Field Championships in that event.

Faye was also selected for the Gambia's 1976 Olympic team but the nation participated in the boycott. Faye argued with the Gambian delegation that he should stay, but they did not permit him resulting in Faye never starting an Olympic competition.

Faye earned his third All-American placing at the 1977 NCAA Division I Outdoor Track and Field Championships, placing 5th in the long jump.

== Personal life ==
Faye was born in Banjul. His birth name Sheikh is a given name and not the honorific title. He worked as a police corporal before his arrival at the 1970 Commonwealth Games.

Faye was a member of the well-known Fayen family of Dobson Street in Banjul, The Gambia.

After retirement from athletics, Faye worked for Nissan Motors where he was showcased at a celebration event for the 1996 Summer Olympics.

In 2009, he was inducted into the Middle Tennessee Blue Raiders Hall of Fame.

Faye lived in Murfreesboro, Tennessee and the Gambia, and became the vice chairman of the Gambian National Sports Council.

He won The Gambia National Olympic Committee's 2011 Most Outstanding Sports Personality Of The Year.

Faye died on 12 February 2013. The executive secretary of the Gambian National Sports Council announced his death.
