= Simbara Maki =

Ivorian hurdler

Personal information
- Nationality: Ivorian
- Born: 12 October 1938
- Died: 8 October 2010 (aged 71)

Sport
- Sport: Track and field
- Event: 110 metres hurdles

Simbara Maki (12 October 1938 – 8 October 2010) was an Ivorian hurdler. He competed in the 110 metres hurdles at the 1964, 1968 and the 1972 Summer Olympics. Maki won a bronze medal in the 110 metres hurdles at the 1965 All-Africa Games.
