= Ralph Doubell =

Australian middle-distance runner

Ralph Doubell AM
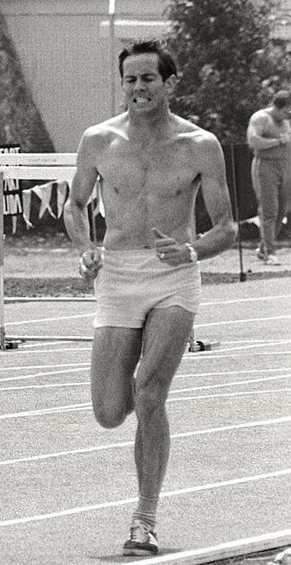
- Doubell in 1968

Personal information
- Born: 11 February 1945 (age 81) Melbourne, Australia
- Education: University of Melbourne
- Height: 1.80 m (5 ft 11 in)
- Weight: 65 kg (143 lb)

Sport
- Sport: Middle-distance running
- Club: University of Melbourne

Achievements and titles
- Personal bests: 1:44.30 (800 m, 1968)
Medal record
Representing Australia
Olympic Games
Gold medal – first place	1968 Mexico City	800 metres
Summer Universiade
Gold medal – first place	1967 Tokyo	800 metres
Bronze medal – third place	1967 Tokyo	4x400 metre relay

Ralph Douglas Doubell AM (born 11 February 1945) is an Australian former athlete, and gold medallist at the 1968 Summer Olympics.

== Athletic career ==
Doubell was born in Melbourne, was educated at Melbourne High School and graduated from the University of Melbourne, where he had come under the tutelage of Austrian-born coach Franz Stampfl.

Doubell's first major international victory in 800 metres was at the World Student Games in Tokyo in 1967 in a time of 1:46.7. His next season (the Olympic season) was severely curtailed by Achilles' tendon injuries, and he was unable to compete for six months prior to the Olympic Games in Mexico City. Doubell, however, was able to recover in time for Mexico City and won the 800 m gold medal, passing the pre-race favourite Wilson Kiprugut of Kenya down the straight to win in a world record equalling time of 1:44.3.

Doubell also won the 800 metres gold medal at the 1969 Pacific Conference Games, in a time of 1:48.0.

Doubell had planned to compete at the 1972 Olympics in Munich, but was prevented from doing so by calf injuries, which brought on his retirement from competitive athletics.

== Post-athletic career ==
After retirement from sports, Doubell enrolled at Harvard Business School. He then worked as a Head of Relationship Management and a Director and Divisional Head of Corporate and Institutional Banking of the Deutsche Bank Group in Australia. He was a Director of Telstra Stadium in Sydney until 2007.

Doubell was inducted into the Sport Australia Hall of Fame in 1985. On 12 June 2006, in the Queen's Birthday Honours List, he was made a Member (AM) of the Order of Australia, for "services to athletics through administrative roles, particularly with Athletics New South Wales, and as a competitor".

Records
Preceded by (New Zealand) Peter Snell	Men's 800 metres World Record Holder equalled by Dave Wottle (USA) on 1972-07-01; 1968-10-15 – 1973-06-27	Succeeded by (Italy) Marcello Fiasconaro
