= John Linaker (runner) =

British steeplechase athlete

Personal information
- Nationality: British (Scottish)
- Born: 16 November 1939 Southport, England

Sport
- Sport: Athletics
- Events: Steeplechase, cross country, middle-distance
- Club: Pitreavie AAC

John Henry Linaker (born 16 November 1939) is an English-born former track and field athlete who competed for Scotland at the 1966 British Empire and Commonwealth Games (now Commonwealth Games).

== Biography ==
Linaker was born in Southport, England, but was a resident of Scotland for most of his life. He was a member of the Pitreavie Amateur Athletic Club.

He won six steeplechase titles at the Scottish AAA Championship in 1960, 1961, 1962, 1963, 1965 and 1966. Additionally, he was the national cross country champion.

Linaker represented the Scottish Empire and Commonwealth Games team at the 1966 British Empire and Commonwealth Games in Kingston, Jamaica, participating in one event, the 1 mile race.
