= Hamadou Evelé =

Cameroonian high jumper

Personal information
- Nationality: Cameroonian
- Born: 15 October 1949 (age 76)
- Height: 186 cm (6 ft 1 in)
- Weight: 73 kg (161 lb)

Sport
- Sport: Athletics
- Event: High jump
Medal record
Men's athletics
Representing Cameroon
African Games
Bronze medal – third place	1973 Lagos	High jump

Hamadou Evelé also written as Amadou Evele or Ahmadou Evélé (born 15 October 1949) is a Cameroonian high jumper and sports administrator.

He won the bronze medal at the 1973 African Games and competed in the men's high jump at the 1972 Summer Olympics.

== Personal life ==
Evelé was born Guirvidig. He studied at the CREPS in Nancy, France.

== Athletics career ==
Evelé was seeded in the 'B' group qualifying round at the 1972 Olympics. He jumped 1.90 metres to place 17th in his group. The same year he set his personal best of 2.10 metres.

Evelé later competed in the 1973 African Games. He won a bronze medal, jumping 2.00 metres.

== Sports administration ==
After his high jump career, Evelé worked in various administrative roles including being the Director of Semry. At the CDBF session of 8 November 2011, Evelé was pledged guilty of mismanagement in 2006 and 2007. He was declared a debtor to the Public Treasury for the sum of 6.1 million representing the damage suffered by Semry with an additional fine of one million also imposed on him. As a lawyer in sports he was involved in the global ban on Cameroon for government interference. In October 2017, following the appointment of a new normalization committee to lead the Fédération Camerounaise de Football (FECAFOOT), he was named as a member of the Commission de la Coupe du Cameroun by the new leadership under Dieudonné Happi. In this capacity, Evele was tasked with organising the 2017 edition of the Coupe du Cameroun, having been retained from the previous normalization committee led by Joseph Owona.
