= Mansour Dia =

Senegalese triple jumper

Mansour Mamadou Dia (27 December 1940 – 28 May 1999) was a Senegalese triple jumper. At the 1965 All-Africa Games he won the silver medal in triple jump and bronze in long jump. At the 1973 All-Africa Games he won another bronze in long jump, but now a gold medal in the triple jump. He finished thirteenth at the 1964 Summer Olympics, eighth at the 1968 Summer Olympics, and sixth at the 1972 Summer Olympics.
