= Gaoussou Koné =

Ivorian sprinter

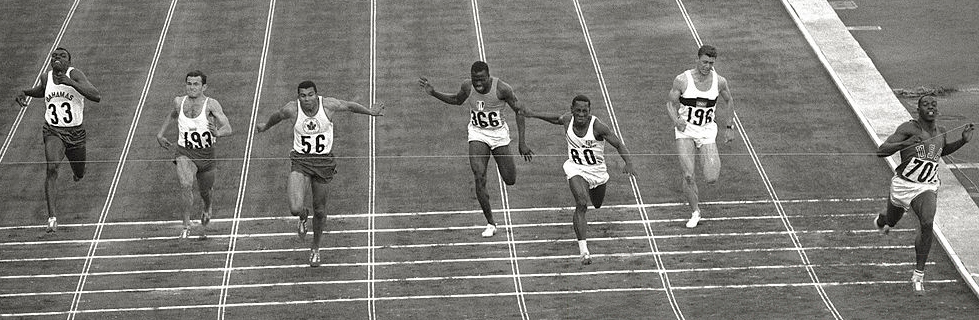

Personal information
- Born: 28 April 1944 (age 82)
Medal record
Men's Athletics
Representing Ivory Coast
All-Africa Games
Gold medal – first place	1965 Brazzaville	100 m
Gold medal – first place	1965 Brazzaville	200 m
Summer Universiade
Gold medal – first place	1967 Tokyo	100 m

Gaoussou Koné (born 28 April 1944) is a former sprinter from Côte d'Ivoire, who represented his native West African country at three consecutive Summer Olympics: 1964, 1968 and 1972. He is best known for winning two gold medals (100 and 200 metres) at the 1965 All-Africa Games.

== Personal bests ==
- 100 metres – 10.21 (1967)
- 200 metres – 21.1 (1965)
