= Peter Francis (runner) =

Kenyan middle-distance runner

Personal information
- Nationality: Kenyan
- Born: 22 December 1936 (age 88)

Sport
- Sport: Middle-distance running
- Event: 800 metres

Peter Francis (born 22 December 1936) is a Kenyan middle-distance runner. He competed in the men's 800 metres at the 1964 Summer Olympics. He won a bronze medal in the 800 metres at the 1965 All-Africa Games.
