= Laurent Sarr =

Senegalese long jumper

Personal information
- Nationality: Senegalese
- Born: 1943 (age 82–83)

Sport
- Sport: Athletics
- Event: Long jump

Laurent Sarr (born 1943) is a Senegalese athlete. He competed in the men's long jump at the 1968 Summer Olympics.
