= Mamadou Sarr (sprinter) =

Senegalese sprinter (1938–2022)

Personal information
- Nationality: Senegalese
- Born: 11 August 1938 Saint-Louis, French West Africa
- Died: 18 June 2022 (aged 83)

Sport
- Sport: Sprinting
- Event: 4 × 400 metres relay

Mamadou Sarr (11 August 1938 – 18 June 2022) was a Senegalese sprinter. He competed in the men's 4 × 400 metres relay at the 1968 Summer Olympics.
