= Papa M'Baye N'Diaye =

Senegalese sprinter (born 1938)

Personal information
- Nationality: Senegalese
- Born: 11 May 1938 (age 87)

Sport
- Sport: Sprinting
- Event: 4 × 400 metres relay

Papa M'Baye N'Diaye (born 11 May 1938) is a Senegalese sprinter. He competed in the 4 × 400 metres relay at the 1964 Summer Olympics and the 1968 Summer Olympics.
