= Folu Erinle =

Nigerian hurdler (born 1940)

Folu Erinle (born 29 January 1940) is a Nigerian former hurdler who competed in the 1964 Summer Olympics.
