= Wilson Kiprugut =

Kenyan sprinter and middle-distance runner (1938–2022)

Wilson Arap Chuma Kiprugut
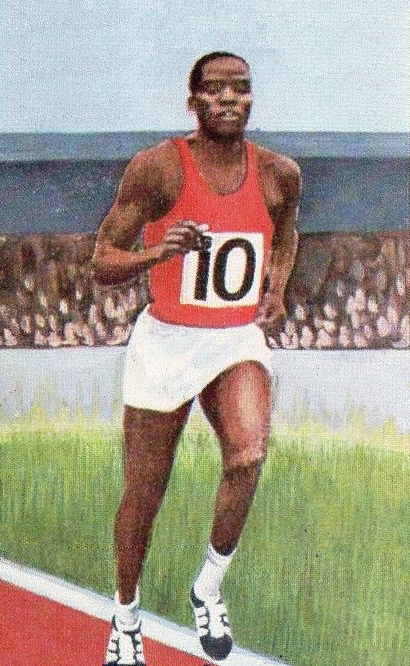
- Kiprugut in 1968

Personal information
- Born: 1938 Kericho, British Kenya
- Died: 1 November 2022 (aged 84) Kericho, Kenya
- Height: 1.78 m (5 ft 10 in)
- Weight: 71 kg (157 lb)

Sport
- Sport: Athletics
- Events: 400 m, 800 m

Achievements and titles
- Personal bests: 400 m: 46.6 (1965); 800 m: 1:44.57 (1968)
Medal record
Men's athletics
Representing Kenya
Olympic Games
Silver medal – second place	1968 Mexico City	800 m
Bronze medal – third place	1964 Tokyo	800 m
British Empire and Commonwealth Games
Silver medal – second place	1966 Kingston	880 yd
All-Africa Games
Gold medal – first place	1965 Brazzaville	400 m
Gold medal – first place	1965 Brazzaville	800 m

Wilson Arap Chuma Kiprugut (1938 – 1 November 2022) was a Kenyan sprinter and middle-distance runner. He competed at the 1964 Tokyo and 1968 Mexico Olympics and won two medals in the 800 metres event; in 1964 he also ran 400 metres, but failed to reach the final. He was the first person from Kenya ever to win an Olympic medal.

At the 1962 Commonwealth Games, Kiprugut was part of the Kenyan 4 × 440 yards relay team which finished fifth. At the 1966 Commonwealth Games, he won the 880 yards silver medal. He won two gold medals (in the 400 and 800 metres) at the inaugural All-Africa Games in 1965.

In 2010, he won the Kenyan Sports Personality of the Year award.

Kiprugut grew up in Kericho and began running as a child while at Kaptebeswet Primary School and Sitotwet Intermediate School. His talent was first identified when he ran at the East and Central African Championships – an event where he won no less than three 880-yard titles.

Kiprugut died on 1 November 2022, at the age of 84.
