= Samuel Igun =

Nigerian athlete

Personal information
- Born: 28 February 1938 (age 88)
Medal record
Men's Athletics
Representing Nigeria
Commonwealth Games
Gold medal – first place	1966 Kingston	Triple Jump
Silver medal – second place	1966 Kingston	High Jump
All-Africa Games
Gold medal – first place	1965 Brazzaville	Triple Jump
Gold medal – first place	1965 Brazzaville	High Jump

Samuel Igun (born 28 February 1938 in Warri, Delta State) is a retired Olympic athlete from Nigeria. He specialised in the triple jump, high jump and long jump events during his career.

Igun represented Nigeria at four consecutive Olympic Games, starting in 1960. He claimed the gold medal in the men's triple jump event at the 1966 British Empire and Commonwealth Games for his native African country.
