= Denis Ségui Kragbé =

Ivorian athlete (1938–1998)

Denis Ségui Kragbé (10 April 1938 – 4 July 1998) was an Ivorian shot putter and discus thrower who competed in the 1964 Summer Olympics and in the 1968 Summer Olympics.
