= Namakoro Niaré =

Malian discus thrower (born 1943)

Namakoro Koto te Niaré (born 4 June 1943 in Bamako) is a Malian former discus thrower who competed in the 1968 Summer Olympics, in the 1972 Summer Olympics, and in the 1980 Summer Olympics. He is the father of French shot putter Yves Niaré and French High Jumper Gaëlle Niaré.
