= Kipchoge Keino =

Kenyan athlete

Kip Keino
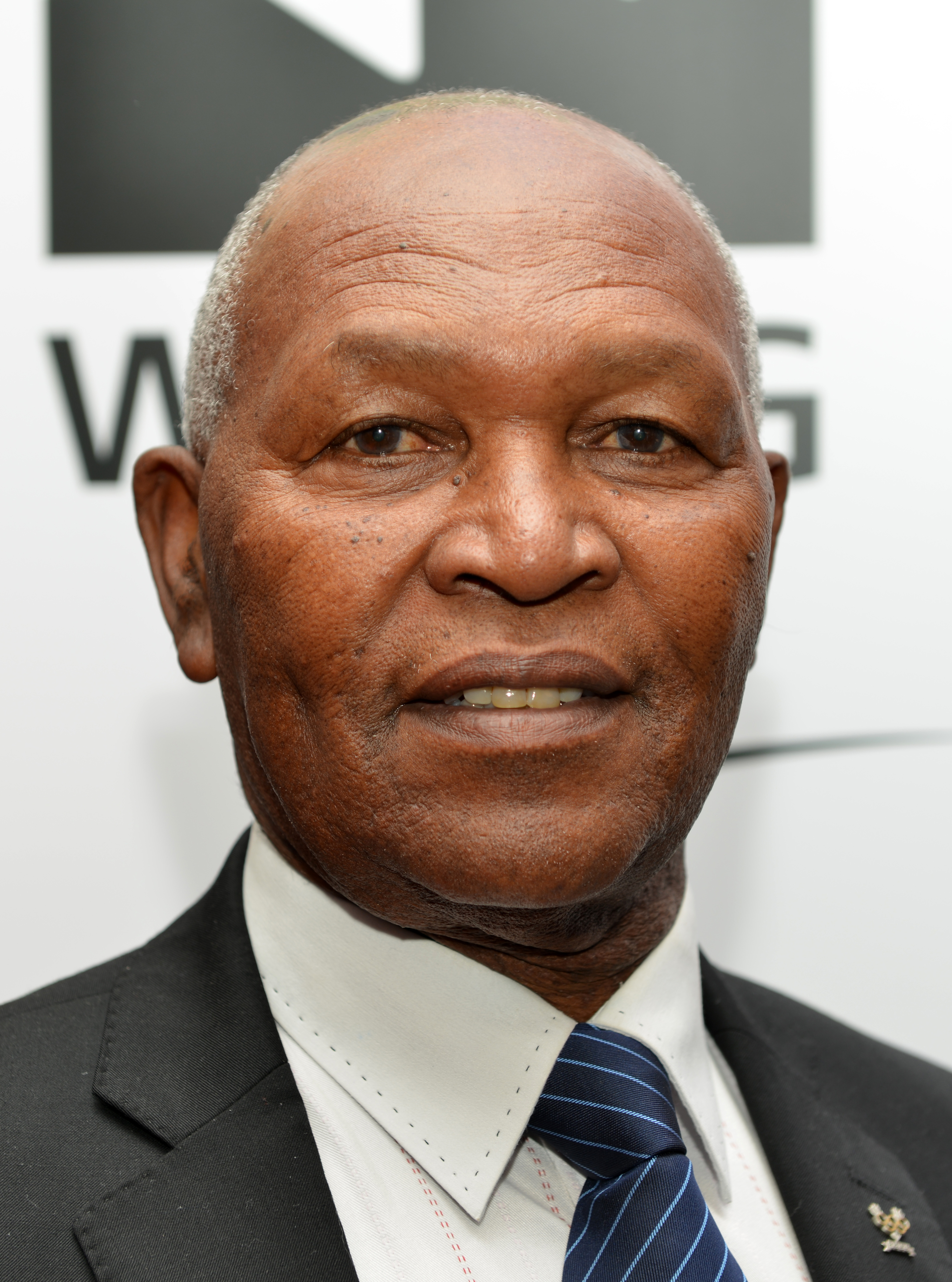
- Kipchoge Keino in January 2014

Personal information
- Full name: Kipchoge Hezekieh Keino
- Born: 17 January 1940 (age 86) Kipsamo, Nandi, Rift Valley, Kenya
- Height: 173 cm (5 ft 8 in)
- Weight: 66 kg (146 lb)
- Spouse: Phyllis Keino

Achievements and titles
- Olympic finals: 1964 Tokyo; 5000 m, 5th 1500 m, 10th 1968 Mexico City; 10,000 m, DNF; 5000 m, Silver; 1500 m, Gold; 1972 Munich; 3000 m steeple, Gold; 1500 m, Silver
- Personal bests: 800 m: 1:46.41 (Munich 1972); 1500 m: 3:34.91 (Mexico City 1968); Mile: 3:53.1 (Kisumu 1967); 3000 m: 7:39.6 (Helsingborg 1965); 5000 m: 13:24.2 (Auckland 1965); 10,000 m: 28:06.4 (Leningrad 1968); 3000 m steeple: 8:23.64 (Munich 1972)
Medal record
Men's athletics
Representing Kenya
Olympic Games
| Gold medal – first place | 1972 Munich | 3000 m steeple |
| Gold medal – first place | 1968 Mexico City | 1500 m |
| Silver medal – second place | 1972 Munich | 1500 m |
| Silver medal – second place | 1968 Mexico City | 5000 m |
Commonwealth Games
| Gold medal – first place | 1970 Edinburgh | 1500 m |
| Gold medal – first place | 1966 Kingston | Mile |
| Gold medal – first place | 1966 Kingston | 3 mile |
| Bronze medal – third place | 1970 Edinburgh | 5000 m |
All-Africa Games
| Gold medal – first place | 1965 Brazzaville | 5000 m |
| Gold medal – first place | 1965 Brazzaville | 1500 m |
| Silver medal – second place | 1973 Lagos | 1500 m |
- Updated on 10 June 2015

Kipchoge Hezekiah Keino (born 17 January 1940) is a retired Kenyan track and field athlete. He was the chairman of the Kenyan Olympic Committee (KOC) until 29 September 2017. A two-time Olympic gold medalist, Keino was among the first in a long line of successful middle and long distance runners to come from the country and has helped and inspired many of his countrymen and women to become the athletics force that they are today. In 2000, he became an honorary member of the International Olympic Committee (IOC). In 2012, he was one of 24 athletes inducted as inaugural members of the IAAF Hall of Fame.

== Early life ==
Keino was born on 17 January 1940 in Kipsamo, Nandi District, Kenya. His name, Kipchoge, is a Nandi language expression for "born near the grain storage shed." His parents died when he was a youngster and he was raised by an aunt. After finishing school, he joined the Kenya Police. Before taking up athletics, he played rugby.

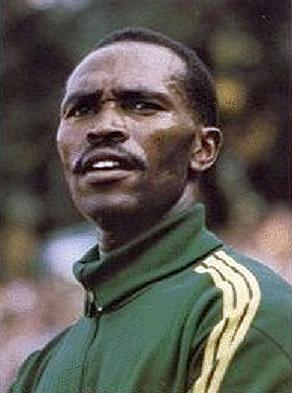
Kipchoge Keino (1972)

== Athletic career ==
He began his international career at the 1962 Commonwealth Games in Perth, Western Australia where he came eleventh in the three miles. At the 1964 Summer Olympics he finished fifth in 5000 m and just missed qualification for the 1500 m final.

On 27 August 1965, Keino lowered the 3000 m world record by over 6 seconds to 7:39.6 in his first attempt at the distance. He won two gold medals (1500 and 5000 metres) at the inaugural All-Africa Games. Later in that year, he broke the 5000 m world record held by Ron Clarke, clocking 13:24.2. At the 1966 Commonwealth Games in Kingston, Jamaica, he won both the mile run and three-mile run. In the next Commonwealth Games, Keino won the 1500 metres and was third in the 5000 metres.

At the 1968 Summer Olympics in Mexico City, he won the 1500 metres gold medal (defeating American favourite and world record holder Jim Ryun by 20 metres, the largest winning margin in the history of the event) and 5000 m silver medal. Four years later, he won the 3000 metres steeplechase gold and 1500 metres silver at the 1972 Summer Olympics in Munich, Germany. Keino was the flag bearer for Kenya in the 1964 Summer Olympics and the 1972 Summer Olympics opening ceremonies. Keino retired in 1973. He is on the cover of the October 1968 issue of Track and Field News, the first issue following the Olympics. He shared the cover of the September 1969 issue with Naftali Bon.

== After athletics ==
- With his wife, Phyllis Keino, he has dedicated significant efforts to humanitarian work in Eldoret, Kenya. They have established the Lewa Children's Home for orphans, the KipKeino Primary School in 1999, and the Kip Keino Secondary School in 2009.
- For his work with orphans, he shared Sports Illustrated magazine's "Sportsmen and Sportswomen of the Year" award in 1987 with seven others, characterized as "Athletes Who Care". In 1996, Kipchoge Keino Stadium in Eldoret was named after him.
- In 2007, he was made an honorary Doctor of Law by the University of Bristol. Earlier, Egerton University in Nakuru had awarded him an honorary degree. In July 2012, he received further recognition from the City of Bristol after the Kenyan Olympic Committee, under his presidency, made Bristol the training base for its athletes in preparation for the London 2012 Olympics. In 2012, Kipchoge Keino was among the inductees in the IAAF Hall of Fame. The Bristol City Council awarded him freedom of the city, making him the first to receive this honour from Bristol since Sir Winston Churchill.
- On 5 August 2016, at the Olympic opening ceremony in Rio de Janeiro, Brazil, Keino was awarded the first Olympic Laurel, for outstanding service to the Olympic movement.
- On 14 May 2021, Jovian asteroid 39285 Kipkeino, discovered by astronomers at Spacewatch in 1997, was named in his honour.

== Personal life ==
Keino resides on a farm in Eldoret, Kenya where he runs a charitable organization for orphans. He is married to Phyllis Keino.

== See also ==
Records
| Preceded by (East Germany) Siegfried Herrmann | Men's 3000 m World Record Holder; 27 August 1965 – 14 September 1972 | Succeeded by (Belgium) Emiel Puttemans |
Sporting positions
| Preceded by (United States) Bob Schul | Men's 5000 m Best Year Performance; 1965 | Succeeded by (Australia) Ron Clarke |
