= 1965 All-Africa Games =

Multi-sport event in Brazzaville, Congo

I All-Africa Games
- Host city: Brazzaville, Congo
- Opening: 18 July 1965
- Closing: 25 July 1965
- Opened by: Alphonse Massemba-Débat

The 1st All-Africa Games (French: 1ers Jeux africains), also known as Brazzaville 1965, was a multi-sport event played from 18 to 25 July 1965, in Brazzaville, Congo.

== History ==
The first games to open to the entire African continent occurred a full forty years after they were first envisioned. Pierre de Coubertin had proposed the first African Games be held in Algiers, Algeria in 1925. The games were never organized. Four years later, Alexandria, Egypt had almost completed preparations for the African Games of 1929 when the colonial powers stepped in to cancel the games, weeks before they were to begin. The colonizers felt the games might serve to unite Africa, and help them break free from their colonial status. The idea of a continental games languished for a time until regional games in West Africa in the early sixties paved the way for the first continental games to be held in July 1965.

Foreshadowing what was to become accepted protocol at major international games, and reflecting the continent's relative political instability, the Congo-Brazzaville Army was on high alert throughout the games for "malcontents" and "counter-revolutionaries". All highways in and out of Brazzaville were patrolled by armored vehicles and all cars within the city, except for games participants and journalists, were stopped and inspected at major checkpoints.

2500 athletes from 29 nations marched into the stadium. Avery Brundage, the IOC president attended the games as the IOC's chief observer.

The games' success was due in large part to the emerging African stars, such as Wilson Kiprugut Chuma (silver medalist in the Tokyo 800 meters), Mohammed Gammoudi (silver medalist in Tokyo, 10,000 meters), and Kip Keino, Naftali Temu and Mamo Wolde, who would all win medals three years later at the Mexico City Olympic Games.

Men competed in ten sports, while women competed in just two: athletics and basketball.

The top medal winning nation was the United Arab Republic, at one time a political union of Egypt and Syria.*

- (It is not yet known if any athletes from Syria competed or won medals in the African Games)

== Participating nations ==
Among the countries that participated at the 1965 All Africa Games were:

- Algeria
- Cameroon
- Chad
- Central African Republic
- Republic of the Congo
- (Democratic Republic of the Congo) DR Congo
- Ivory Coast
- Ethiopia
- Gabon
- Ghana
- Kenya
- Madagascar
- Mali
- Niger
- Nigeria
- Senegal
- Sudan
- Tanzania
- Togo
- Tunisia
- Uganda
- United Arab Republic
- Upper Volta
- Zambia
- Benin (Dahomey)

== Sports ==
- Athletics
- Boxing
- Cycling
- Judo
- Tennis
- Swimming
- Football
- Basketball
- Volleyball
- Handball

== Medal table ==
* Host nation (Congo (Congo-Brazzaville))

| Rank | Nation | Gold | Silver | Bronze | Total |
|---|---|---|---|---|---|
| 1 | United Arab Republic (UAR) | 17 | 10 | 3 | 30 |
| 2 | Nigeria (NGR) | 9 | 6 | 4 | 19 |
| 3 | Kenya (KEN) | 8 | 11 | 4 | 23 |
| 4 | Senegal (SEN) | 6 | 3 | 7 | 16 |
| 5 | Ivory Coast (CIV) | 5 | 2 | 5 | 12 |
| 6 | Ghana (GHA) | 2 | 4 | 6 | 12 |
| 7 | Algeria (ALG) | 2 | 3 | 6 | 11 |
| 8 | Mali (MLI) | 2 | 1 | 0 | 3 |
| 9 | Sudan (SUD) | 1 | 6 | 2 | 9 |
| 10 | Tunisia (TUN) | 1 | 5 | 6 | 12 |
| 11 | Cameroon (CMR) | 1 | 2 | 2 | 5 |
| 11 | Congo (Congo-Brazzaville)* | 1 | 2 | 2 | 5 |
| 13 | Madagascar (MAD) | 0 | 2 | 4 | 6 |
| 14 | Uganda (UGA) | 0 | 1 | 4 | 5 |
| 15 | Upper Volta (VOL) | 0 | 1 | 1 | 2 |
| 16 | Chad (CHA) | 0 | 0 | 3 | 3 |
| 16 | Gabon (GAB) | 0 | 0 | 3 | 3 |
| 18 | Togo (TOG) | 0 | 0 | 2 | 2 |
| 19 | DR Congo (COD) | 0 | 0 | 1 | 1 |
| 19 | Ethiopia (ETH) | 0 | 0 | 1 | 1 |
| 19 | Niger (NIG) | 0 | 0 | 1 | 1 |
| 19 | Tanzania (TAN) | 0 | 0 | 1 | 1 |
| 19 | Zambia (ZAM) | 0 | 0 | 1 | 1 |
| Totals (23 entries) | | 55 | 59 | 69 | 183 |

== Athletics ==
Several athletes, all male, won more than one event:

- Gaoussou Koné, Côte d'Ivoire (100 metres and 200 metres)
- Wilson Kiprugut, Kenya (400 metres and 800 metres)
- Kipchoge Keino, Kenya (1500 metres and 5000 metres)
- Samuel Igun, Nigeria (high jump and triple jump)

In addition, Senegal won both relay races for men (4x100 metres and 4x400 metres).

Women were only allowed to compete in 100 metres, 80 metres hurdles, high jump, long jump, javelin throw, and 4 x 100 metres relay.

== Football ==
The football tournament was won by the host country Congo, their only gold medal at the Games.

| Gold: | Silver: | Bronze: |
|---|---|---|
| Congo | Mali | Ivory Coast |
