= List of African Championships in Athletics medalists (women) =

This is the complete list of women's medalists at the African Championships in Athletics from 1979 to 2018.

== Current program ==
=== 100 metres ===
Championships	Gold	Silver	Bronze
1979 Dakar	Oguzoeme Nsenu (NGR)	Hannah Afriyie (GHA)	Nzaeli Kyomo (TAN)
1982 Cairo	Alice Adala (KEN)	Nawal El Moutawakel (MAR)	Nzaeli Kyomo (TAN)
1984 Rabat	Doris Wiredu (GHA)	Joyce Odhiambo (KEN)	Grace Armah (GHA)
1985 Cairo	Rufina Ubah (NGR)	Doris Wiredu (GHA)	Lynda Eseimokumo (NGR)
1988 Annaba	Mary Onyali (NGR)	Falilat Ogunkoya (NGR)	Lalao Ravaonirina (MAD)
1989 Lagos	Mary Onyali (NGR)	Tina Iheagwam (NGR)	Rufina Ubah (NGR)
1990 Cairo	Onyinye Chikezie (NGR)	Chioma Ajunwa (NGR)	Mary Tombiri (NGR)
1992 Belle-Vue	Elinda Vorster (RSA)	Marcel Winkler (RSA)	Rufina Ubah (NGR)
1993 Durban	Beatrice Utondu (NGR)	Elinda Vorster (RSA)	Christy Opara-Thompson (NGR)
1996 Yaoundé	Georgette Nkoma (CMR)	Marliese Steyn (RSA)	Myriam Léonie Mani (CMR)
1998 Dakar	Mary Onyali (NGR)	Endurance Ojokolo (NGR)	Rose Aboaje (NGR)
2000 Algiers	Myriam Léonie Mani (CMR)	Aïda Diop (SEN)	Monica Twum (GHA)
2002 Radès	Endurance Ojokolo (NGR)	Myriam Léonie Mani (CMR)	Chinedu Odozor (NGR)
2004 Brazzaville	Endurance Ojokolo (NGR)	Mercy Nku (NGR)	Geraldine Pillay (RSA)
2006 Bambous	Vida Anim (GHA)	Geraldine Pillay (RSA)	Endurance Ojokolo (NGR)
2008 Addis Ababa	Damola Osayomi (NGR)	Vida Anim (GHA)	Delphine Atangana (CMR)
2010 Nairobi	Blessing Okagbare (NGR)	Ruddy Zang Milama (GAB)	Oludamola Osayomi (NGR)
2012 Porto-Novo	Ruddy Zang Milama (GAB)	Blessing Okagbare (NGR)	Gloria Asumnu (NGR)
2014 Marrakech	Blessing Okagbare (NGR)	Murielle Ahouré (CIV)	Marie-Josée Ta Lou (CIV)
2016 Durban	Murielle Ahouré (CIV)	Carina Horn (RSA)	Marie-Josée Ta Lou (CIV)

=== 200 metres ===
Games	Gold		Silver		Bronze	
1979	Hannah Afriyie; Ghana	23.81	Nzaeli Kyomo; Tanzania	24.48	Ruth Waithera; Kenya	24.66
1982	Nzaeli Kyomo; Tanzania	23.7	Marième Boye; Senegal	24.5	Ruth Enang; Cameroon	24.6
1984	Nawal El Moutawakil; Morocco	23.93	Mercy Addy; Ghana	24.42	Joyce Odhiambo; Kenya	24.44
1985	Rufina Uba; Nigeria	23.79	Mary Onyali; Nigeria	23.98	Martha Appiah; Ghana	24.10
1988	Falilat Ogunkoya; Nigeria	23.33w	Martha Appiah; Ghana	23.72w	Veronica Bawuah; Ghana	24.35w
1989	Mary Onyali; Nigeria	23.00	Falilat Ogunkoya; Nigeria	23.74	Lalao Ravaonirina; Madagascar	23.94
1990	Fatima Yusuf; Nigeria	23.19	Emily Odoemenam; Nigeria	23.59	Helena Amoako; Ghana	24.36
1992	Elinda Vorster; South Africa	23.60	Marcel Winkler; South Africa	23.60	Yolanda Steyn; South Africa	24.11
1993	Mary Onyali; Nigeria	22.71	Yolanda Steyn; South Africa	23.22	Evette de Klerk; South Africa	23.29
1996	Georgette Nkoma; Cameroon	23.1	Marliese Steyn; South Africa	23.3	Myriam Léonie Mani; Cameroon	23.5
1998	Falilat Ogunkoya; Nigeria	22.22	Rose Aboaje; Nigeria	22.83	Heide Seÿerling; South Africa	22.89
2000	Myriam Léonie Mani; Cameroon	22.54	Aïda Diop; Senegal	23.01	Fatima Yusuf; Nigeria	23.27
2002	Nadjina Kaltouma; Chad	22.80w	Aïda Diop; Senegal	23.29w	Myriam Léonie Mani; Cameroon	23.30w
2004	Geraldine Pillay; South Africa	23.18	Kadiatou Camara; Mali	23.22	Nadjina Kaltouma; Chad	23.29

=== 400 metres ===
Games	Gold		Silver		Bronze	
1979	Grace Bakari; Ghana	53.33	Marième Boye; Senegal	54.52	Mary Chemweno; Kenya	55.41
1982	Ruth Atuti; Kenya	54.48	Célestine N'Drin; Ivory Coast	54.58	Marième Boye; Senegal	54.87
1984	Ruth Atuti; Kenya	54.05	Mable Esendi; Kenya	54.88	Mercy Addy; Ghana	56.36
1985	Kehinde Vaughan; Nigeria	53.33	Doris Wiredu; Ghana	53.62	Grace Bakari; Ghana	53.72
1988	Airat Bakare; Nigeria	52.15	Célestine N'Drin; Ivory Coast	52.77	Mercy Addy; Ghana	52.88
1989	Falilat Ogunkoya; Nigeria	51.22	Fatima Yusuf; Nigeria	52.30	Airat Bakare; Nigeria	52.38
1990	Fatima Yusuf; Nigeria	50.85	Charity Opara; Nigeria	51.68	Emily Odoemenam; Nigeria	53.30
1992	Omotayo Akinremi; Nigeria	52.53	Aïssatou Tandian; Senegal	52.64	Omolade Akinremi; Nigeria	53.14
1993	Tina Paulino; Mozambique	51.82	Emily Odoemenam; Nigeria	52.26	Aïssatou Tandian; Senegal	53.00
1996	Saidat Onanuga; Nigeria	52.85	Grace Birungi; Uganda	53.40	Alimata Koné; Ivory Coast	54.31
1998	Falilat Ogunkoya; Nigeria	50.07	Charity Opara; Nigeria	50.13	Ony Paule Ratsimbazafy; Madagascar	52.11
2000	Claudine Komgang; Cameroon	51.35	Mireille Nguimgo; Cameroon	51.81	Nadjina Kaltouma; Chad	52.27
2002	Nadjina Kaltouma; Chad	51.09	Mireille Nguimgo; Cameroon	51.61	Awatef Ben Hassine; Tunisia	52.22
2004	Fatou Bintou Fall; Senegal	50.62	Nadjina Kaltouma; Chad	50.80	Hortense Béwouda; Cameroon	51.15

=== 800 metres ===
Games	Gold		Silver		Bronze	
1979	Mary Chemweno; Kenya	2:08.4a	Rose Tata; Kenya	2:10.9a	Amsala Woldegebriel; Ethiopia	2:11.9a
1982	Evelyn Adiru; Uganda	2:07.0	Célestine N'Drin; Ivory Coast	2:08.2	Mary Chepkemboi; Kenya	2:08.4
1984	Justina Chepchirchir; Kenya	2:04.52	Florence Wanjiru; Kenya	2:05.96	Célestine N'Drin; Ivory Coast	2:07.72
1985	Selina Chirchir; Kenya	2:03.70	Mary Chemweno; Kenya	2:04.58	Fatima Aouam; Morocco	2:04.91
1988	Hassiba Boulmerka; Algeria	2:06.16	Maria Mutola; Mozambique	2:06.55	Sheila Seebaluck; Mauritius	2:08.26
1989	Hassiba Boulmerka; Algeria	2:06.8	Zewde Haile Mariam; Ethiopia	2:08.2	Emebet Shiferaw; Ethiopia	2:09.3
1990	Maria Mutola; Mozambique	2:13.54	Edith Nakiyingi; Uganda	2:14.00	Zewde Haile Mariam; Ethiopia	2:15.14
1992	Zewde Haile Mariam; Ethiopia	2:06.20	Najat Ouali; Morocco	2:07.40	Ilse Wicksell; South Africa	2:07.48
1993	Maria Mutola; Mozambique	1:56.36	Gladys Wamuyu; Kenya	2:01.24	Ilse Wicksell; South Africa	2:03.75
1996	Naomi Mugo; Kenya	2:02.8	Léontine Tsiba; Congo	2:09.1	Adama Njie; Gambia	2:10.1
1998	Maria Mutola; Mozambique	1:57.95	Hasna Benhassi; Morocco	2:01.24	Julia Sakara; Zimbabwe	2:01.55
2000	Hasna Benhassi; Morocco	1:59.01	Nouria Mérah-Benida; Algeria	1:59.73	Gladys Wamuyu; Kenya	2:00.32
2002	Maria Mutola; Mozambique	2:03.11	Agnes Samaria; Namibia	2:03.63	Mina Aït Hammou; Morocco	2:03.94
2004	Saïda El Mehdi; Morocco	2:03.52	Charity Wandia; Kenya	2:04.08	Caroline Chepkwony; Kenya	2:04.58

=== 1500 metres ===
Games	Gold		Silver		Bronze	
1979	Sakina Boutamine; Algeria	4:23.6a	Rose Thomson; Kenya	4:25.0a	Hassania Darami; Morocco	4:26.5a
1982	Justina Chepchirchir; Kenya	4:22.03	Mary Chepkemboi; Kenya	4:24.58	Linah Cheruiyot; Kenya	4:26.39
1984	Justina Chepchirchir; Kenya	4:18.45	Fatima Aouam; Morocco	4:22.75	Leïla Bendahmane; Algeria	4:23.15
1985	Mary Chemweno; Kenya	4:17.90	Fatima Aouam; Morocco	4:19.11	Hellen Kimaiyo; Kenya	4:22.85
1988	Hassiba Boulmerka; Algeria	4:12.14	Fatima Aouam; Morocco	4:12.57	Getenesh Urge; Ethiopia	4:17.61
1989	Hassiba Boulmerka; Algeria	4:13.85	Hellen Kimaiyo; Kenya	4:16.42	Emebet Shiferaw; Ethiopia	4:20.81
1990	Maria Mutola; Mozambique	4:25.27	Edith Nakiyingi; Uganda	4:25.34	Margaret Ngotho; Kenya	4:27.14
1992	Elana Meyer; South Africa	4:18.44	Gwen Griffiths; South Africa	4:20.79	Najat Ouali; Morocco	4:23.22
1993	Elana Meyer; South Africa	4:12.56	Gwen Griffiths; South Africa	4:13.17	Getenesh Urge; Ethiopia	4:13.68
1996	Naomi Mugo; Kenya	4:12.3	Stéphanie Nicole Zanga; Cameroon	4:34.2	Léontine Tsiba; Congo	4:35.6
1998	Jackline Maranga; Kenya	4:11.75	Julia Sakara; Zimbabwe	4:13.64	Bouchra Benthami; Morocco	4:17.83
2000	Nouria Mérah-Benida; Algeria	4:16.14	Gladys Wamuyu; Kenya	4:16.56	Berhane Herpassa; Ethiopia	4:16.87
2002	Jackline Maranga; Kenya	4:18.91	Abir Nakhli; Tunisia	4:19.02	Hasna Benhassi; Morocco	4:20.15
2004	Nancy Lagat; Kenya	4:24.56	Saïda El Mehdi; Morocco	4:24.87	Jeruto Kiptum; Kenya	4:25.85

=== 3000 metres ===
Games	Gold		Silver		Bronze	
1979	Sakina Boutamine; Algeria	9:31.1a	Rose Thomson; Kenya	9:32.1a	Hassania Darami; Morocco	9:39.7a
1982	Justina Chepchirchir; Kenya	9:20.3	Linah Cheruiyot; Kenya	9:20.8	Hassania Darami; Morocco	9:54.9
1984	Mary Chepkemboi; Kenya	9:19.05	Regina Chemeli; Kenya	9:22.17	Leïla Bendahmane; Algeria	9:26.28
1985	Hellen Kimaiyo; Kenya	9:18.53	Hassania Darami; Morocco	9:19.82	Regina Chemeli; Kenya	9:20.62
1988	Fatima Aouam; Morocco	8:59.19	Josiane Boullé; Mauritius	9:14.37	Tigist Moreda; Ethiopia	9:15.92
1989	Hellen Kimaiyo; Kenya	9:14.97	Jane Ngotho; Kenya	9:15.43	Luchia Yishak; Ethiopia	9:24.31
1990	Derartu Tulu; Ethiopia	9:11.21	Luchia Yishak; Ethiopia	9:15.99	Margaret Ngotho; Kenya	9:16.41
1992	Derartu Tulu; Ethiopia	9:01.12	Gwen Griffiths; South Africa	9:03.10	Getenesh Urge; Ethiopia	9:03.32
1993	Gwen Griffiths; South Africa	9:13.92	Merima Denboba; Ethiopia	9:14.48	Hellen Chepngeno; Kenya	9:14.49
1998	Zahra Ouaziz; Morocco	8:53.75	Genet Gebregiorgis; Ethiopia	9:13.47	Yimenashu Taye; Ethiopia	9:13.59

=== 5000 metres ===
Games	Gold		Silver		Bronze	
1996	Florence Djépé; Cameroon	17:59.32	Marie Python; Cameroon	18:14.40	Cathreen Ngwang; Cameroon	19:27.39
1998	Berhane Adere; Ethiopia	15:54.31	Sally Barsosio; Kenya	15:59.12	Merima Denboba; Ethiopia	16:11.16
2000	Asmae Leghzaoui; Morocco	15:43.46	Meseret Defar; Ethiopia	15:49.86	Merima Denboba; Ethiopia	15:53.68
2002	Berhane Adere; Ethiopia	15:51.08	Dorcus Inzikuru; Uganda	15:54.22	Ejegayehu Dibaba; Ethiopia	15:56.02
2004	Etalemahu Kidane; Ethiopia	16:25.83	Priscah Jepleting; Kenya	16:26.15	Angele Haronsimana; Burundi	16:55.99

=== 10,000 metres ===
Games	Gold		Silver		Bronze	
1985	Hassania Darami; Morocco	35:09.68	Karima Farag Mohamed; Ethiopia	44:01.32	only 2 finishers	35:41.80
1988	Marcianne Mukamurenzi; Rwanda	33:03.98	Hassania Darami; Morocco	33:41.75	Malika Benhabylès; Algeria	34:09.48
1989	Jane Ngotho; Kenya	33:05.60	Tigist Moreda; Ethiopia	34:05.58	Marcianne Mukamurenzi; Rwanda	34:24.67
1990	Derartu Tulu; Ethiopia	33:37.82	Jane Ngotho; Kenya	33:39.26	Tigist Moreda; Ethiopia	32:28.86
1992	Derartu Tulu; Ethiopia	31:32.25	Lydia Cheromei; Kenya	31:41.09	Luchia Yishak; Ethiopia	32:55.32
1993	Berhane Adere; Ethiopia	32:48.52	Lydia Cheromei; Kenya	32:54.55	Fatuma Roba; Ethiopia	34:08.79
2000	Souad Aït Salem; Algeria	34:02.28	Genet Teka; Ethiopia	34:05.18	Bouchra Chaabi; Morocco	32:21.60
2002	Susan Chepkemei; Kenya	31:45.14	Leah Malot; Kenya	32:00.78	Eyerusalem Kuma; Ethiopia	32:35.71
2004	Eyerusalem Kuma; Ethiopia	31:56.77	Irene Kwambai; Kenya	31:57.54	Catherine Kirui; Kenya	None

=== 3000 metres steeplechase ===
Games	Gold		Silver		Bronze	
2004	Bouchra Chaabi; Morocco	9:53.46	Nawal Baïbi; Morocco	10:11.42	Tebogo Masehla; South Africa	10:34.40

=== 100 metres hurdles ===
Games	Gold		Silver		Bronze	
1979	Judy Bell-Gam; Nigeria	14.13	Bella Bell-Gam; Nigeria	14.36	Fatima El Faquir; Morocco	14.52
1982	Nawal El Moutawakil; Morocco	13.8	Ruth Kyalisima; Uganda	14.0	Chérifa Meskaoui; Morocco	14.0
1984	Maria Usifo; Nigeria	13.42	Awa Dioum-Ndiaye; Senegal	14.40	Chérifa Meskaoui; Morocco	14.55
1985	Maria Usifo; Nigeria	13.52	Cécile Ngambi; Cameroon	13.81	Albertine Koutouan; Ivory Coast	14.27
1988	Maria Usifo; Nigeria	13.71	Dinah Yankey; Ghana	13.94	Yasmina Azzizi; Algeria	14.08
1989	Dinah Yankey; Ghana	13.68	Hope Obika; Nigeria	13.80	Mosun Adesina; Nigeria	13.86
1990	Dinah Yankey; Ghana	13.55	Nezha Bidouane; Morocco	13.70	Mosun Adesina; Nigeria	13.85
1992	Ime Akpan; Nigeria	13.14	Karen van der Veen; South Africa	13.29	Annemarie le Roux; South Africa	13.70
1993	Nicole Ramalalanirina; Madagascar	13.32	Taiwo Aladefa; Nigeria	13.50	Annemarie le Roux; South Africa	13.74
1996	Glory Alozie; Nigeria	13.62	Lana Uys; South Africa	13.78	Mame Tacko Diouf; Senegal	14.21
1998	Glory Alozie; Nigeria	12.77	Mame Tacko Diouf; Senegal	13.08	Corien Botha; South Africa	13.25
2000	Glory Alozie; Nigeria	13.09	Lalanirina Rosa Rakotozafy; Madagascar	13.21	Maria-Joëlle Conjungo; Central African Republic	13.77
2002	Lalanirina Rosa Rakotozafy; Madagascar	13.13w	Angela Atede; Nigeria	13.16w	Kéné Ndoye; Senegal	13.72w
2004	Lalanirina Rosa Rakotozafy; Madagascar	13.73	Carole Kaboud Mebam; Cameroon	14.07	Alima Soura; Burkina Faso	14.38

=== 400 metres hurdles ===
Games	Gold		Silver		Bronze	
1979	Fatima El Faquir; Morocco	59.73	Rose Tata; Kenya	59.85	Ruth Kyalisima; Uganda	60.41
1982	Nawal El Moutawakil; Morocco	58.42	Ruth Kyalisima; Uganda	59.00	Rose Tata-Muya; Kenya	60.9
1984	Nawal El Moutawakil; Morocco	56.01	Rachida Ferdjaoui; Algeria	63.17	only 2 finishers	59.85
1985	Nawal El Moutawakil; Morocco	56.00	Maria Usifo; Nigeria	57.02	Marie Womplou; Ivory Coast	57.60
1988	Maria Usifo; Nigeria	56.74	Ruth Kyalisima; Uganda	57.32	Marie Womplou; Ivory Coast	59.51
1989	Maria Usifo; Nigeria	55.45	Marie Womplou; Ivory Coast	57.57	Zewde Haile Mariam; Ethiopia	58.83
1990	Nezha Bidouane; Morocco	57.17	Omolade Akinremi; Nigeria	57.97	Omotayo Akinremi; Nigeria	57.43
1992	Myrtle Bothma; South Africa	56.02	Nadia Zétouani; Morocco	57.31	Omolade Akinremi; Nigeria	58.23
1993	Omotayo Akinremi; Nigeria	57.59	Lana Uys; South Africa	57.60	Karen Swanepoel; South Africa	60.19
1996	Saidat Onanuga; Nigeria	56.64	Lana Uys; South Africa	57.05	Kleintjie Mogotsi; South Africa	56.84
1998	Nezha Bidouane; Morocco	54.24	Mame Tacko Diouf; Senegal	55.06	Saidat Onanuga; Nigeria	62.45
2000	Mame Tacko Diouf; Senegal	57.48	Gnima Touré; Senegal	58.96	Nabila Jami; Tunisia	58.86
2002	Zahra Lachgar; Morocco	57.91	Carole Kaboud Mebam; Cameroon	58.11	Mame Tacko Diouf; Senegal	57.12
2004	Surita Febbraio; South Africa	55.12	Mame Tacko Diouf; Senegal	55.62	Zahra Lachgar; Morocco	None

=== High jump ===
Games	Gold		Silver		Bronze	
1979	Kawther Akrémi; Tunisia	1.69	Elizabeth Ezo; Nigeria	1.69	Fernande Agnentchoué; Gabon	1.63
1982	Fernande Agnentchoué; Gabon	1.67	Salimata Coulibaly; Ivory Coast	1.67	Lucienne N'Da; Ivory Coast	1.64
1984	Awa Dioum-Ndiaye; Senegal	1.76	Lucienne N'Da; Ivory Coast	1.73	Salimata Coulibaly; Ivory Coast	1.70
1985	Awa Dioum-Ndiaye; Senegal	1.76	Kawther Akrémi; Tunisia	1.76	Lucienne N'Da; Ivory Coast	1.70
1988	Lucienne N'Da; Ivory Coast	1.80	Constance Senghor; Senegal	1.68	Salimata Coulibaly; Ivory Coast	1.68
1989	Lucienne N'Da; Ivory Coast	1.81	Nkechi Madubuko; Nigeria	1.78	Yasmina Azzizi; Algeria	1.78
1990	Lucienne N'Da; Ivory Coast	1.80	Stella Agbaegbu; Nigeria	1.77	Ifeanyi Aduba; Nigeria	1.68
1992	Lucienne N'Da; Ivory Coast	1.95	Charmaine Weavers; South Africa	1.92	Desiré du Plessis; South Africa	1.86
1993	Charmaine Weavers; South Africa	1.90	Lucienne N'Da; Ivory Coast	1.86	Desiré du Plessis; South Africa	1.80
1996	Irène Tiendrébéogo; Burkina Faso	1.84	Lolita Nack; Cameroon	1.80	Jeanine Blé; Ivory Coast	1.75
1998	Hestrie Storbeck; South Africa	1.92	Irène Tiendrébéogo; Burkina Faso	1.84	Nkechinyere Mbaoma; Nigeria	1.75
2000	Hind Bounouar; Morocco	1.75	Amina Lemgherbi; Algeria	1.70	Hamida Benhocine; Algeria	1.70
2002	Hestrie Cloete (Storbeck); South Africa	1.95	Amina Lemgherbi; Algeria	1.70	Hanène Dhouibi; Tunisia	1.70
2004	Hestrie Cloete; South Africa	1.95	Samantha Dodd; South Africa	1.60	Janice Josephs; South Africa	1.50

=== Pole vault ===
Games	Gold		Silver		Bronze	
2000	Syrine Balti; Tunisia	3.85	Annelie van Wyk; South Africa	3.80	Rasha Abdel Khalek; Egypt	3.10
2002	Syrine Balti; Tunisia	4.06	Aïda Mohsni; Tunisia	3.60	Asma Akkari; Tunisia	3.40
2004	Syrine Balti; Tunisia	4.00	Samantha Dodd; South Africa	3.80	Nancy Cheekoussen; Mauritius	3.70

=== Long jump ===
Games	Gold		Silver		Bronze	
1979	Bella Bell-Gam; Nigeria	6.24	Florence Ochonogor; Nigeria	6.18	Jeanette Yawson; Ghana	6.04
1982	Jacinta Serete; Kenya	5.37	Ifaf Abdel Fatah Mohamed; Egypt	5.22	Soheir Mohamed Ahmed; Egypt	5.03
1984	Marianne Mendoza; Senegal	5.93	Basma Gharbi; Tunisia	5.77	Dalila Tayebi; Algeria	5.68
1985	Marianne Mendoza; Senegal	6.15	Grace Armah; Ghana	6.01	Caroline Nwajei; Nigeria	6.00
1988	Juliana Yendork; Ghana	5.70	Néné Sangharé; Senegal	5.68w	Fatou Tambédou; Senegal	5.56w
1989	Chioma Ajunwa; Nigeria	6.53	Beatrice Utondu; Nigeria	6.20	Christy Opara; Nigeria	6.18
1990	Chioma Ajunwa; Nigeria	6.13	Stella Emefesi; Nigeria	5.79	Nagwa Abd El Hay Riad; Egypt	5.71
1992	Karen Botha; South Africa	6.78	Stella Emefesi; Nigeria	5.98	Maryna van Niekerk; South Africa	5.98
1993	Christy Opara-Thompson; Nigeria	6.57	Beatrice Utondu; Nigeria	6.44	Hiwot Sisay; Ethiopia	6.23
1996	Grace Umelo; Nigeria	6.13	Béryl Laramé; Seychelles	5.98	Kéné Ndoye; Senegal	5.85
1998	Chioma Ajunwa; Nigeria	6.78	Chinedu Odozor; Nigeria	6.45	Baya Rahouli; Algeria	6.36
2000	Kéné Ndoye; Senegal	6.39	Elisa Cossa; Mozambique	6.20	Béryl Laramé; Seychelles	6.18
2002	Françoise Mbango Etone; Cameroon	6.68w	Kéné Ndoye; Senegal	6.45w	Chinedu Odozor; Nigeria	6.39
2004	Kéné Ndoye; Senegal	6.64	Kadiatou Camara; Mali	6.29	Yah Koïta; Mali	6.27

=== Triple jump ===
Games	Gold		Silver		Bronze	
1992	Awa Dioum-Ndiaye; Senegal	12.47	Ndounga Kolossi; Kenya	12.41	Sonya Agbéssi; Benin	12.17
1993	Petrusa Swart; South Africa	12.95w	Béryl Laramé; Seychelles	12.20w	Sonya Agbéssi; Benin	12.02w
1996	Kéné Ndoye; Senegal	12.99	Abiola Williams; Nigeria	12.68	Françoise Mbango Etone; Cameroon	12.51
1998	Baya Rahouli; Algeria	13.96	Françoise Mbango Etone; Cameroon	13.80	Kéné Ndoye; Senegal	13.30
2000	Baya Rahouli; Algeria	14.23	Françoise Mbango Etone; Cameroon	13.87	Kéné Ndoye; Senegal	13.81
2002	Françoise Mbango Etone; Cameroon	14.95	Kéné Ndoye; Senegal	14.28	Baya Rahouli; Algeria	13.78
2004	Yamilé Aldama; Sudan	14.90	Kéné Ndoye; Senegal	14.44	Mariette Mien; Burkina Faso	12.61

=== Shot put ===
Games	Gold		Silver		Bronze	
1979	Odette Mistoul; Gabon	13.45	Grace Apiafi; Nigeria	13.24	Joyce Aciro; Uganda	12.95
1982	Odette Mistoul; Gabon	14.21	Souad Malloussi; Morocco	13.74	Herina Malit; Kenya	12.56
1984	Odette Mistoul; Gabon	15.51	Souad Malloussi; Morocco	15.31	Aïcha Dahmous; Algeria	13.44
1985	Souad Malloussi; Morocco	15.20	Agnès Tchuinté; Cameroon	14.74	Odette Mistoul; Gabon	14.54
1988	Hanan Ahmed Khaled; Egypt	15.02	Souad Malloussi; Morocco	14.85	Jeanne Ngo Minyemeck; Cameroon	13.92
1989	Hanan Ahmed Khaled; Egypt	14.28	Mariam Nnodu; Nigeria	14.02	Ann Otutu; Nigeria	13.88
1990	Hanan Ahmed Khaled; Egypt	15.21	Elizabeth Olaba; Kenya	14.26	Fouzia Fatihi; Morocco	14.12
1992	Fouzia Fatihi; Morocco	15.82	Hanan Ahmed Khaled; Egypt	15.49	Elizabeth Olaba; Kenya	14.77
1993	Louise Meintjies; South Africa	14.66	Elizabeth Olaba; Kenya	14.42	Luzanda Swanepoel; South Africa	14.23
1996	Hanan Ahmed Khaled; Egypt	14.47	Wafa Ismail El Baghdadi; Egypt	14.24	Oumou Traoré; Mali	12.84
1998	Veronica Abrahamse; South Africa	15.07	Amel Ben Khaled; Tunisia	14.83	Hanan Ahmed Khaled; Egypt	14.68
2000	Hanaa Salah El Melegi; Egypt	16.01	Amel Ben Khaled; Tunisia	15.39	Wafa Ismail El Baghdadi; Egypt	14.97
2002	Vivian Chukwuemeka; Nigeria	17.60	Amel Ben Khaled; Tunisia	15.94	Wafa Ismail El Baghdadi; Egypt	15.43
2004	Wafa Ismail El Baghdadi; Egypt	15.53	Amel Ben Khaled; Tunisia	15.45	Alifatou Djibril; Togo	15.16

=== Discus throw ===
Games	Gold		Silver		Bronze	
1979	Zoubida Laayouni; Morocco	46.18	Fathia Jerbi; Tunisia	45.18	Helen Alyek; Uganda	43.04
1982	Zoubida Laayouni; Morocco	51.50	Helen Alyek; Uganda	42.40	Filomena Silva; Angola	42.20
1984	Zoubida Laayouni; Morocco	52.70	Aïcha Dahmous; Algeria	50.12	Chérifa Meskaoui; Morocco	46.04
1985	Zoubida Laayouni; Morocco	51.80	Mariette van Heerden; Zimbabwe	50.14	Aïcha Dahmous; Algeria	48.84
1988	Grace Apiafi; Nigeria	50.60	Hanan Ahmed Khaled; Egypt	47.58	Zoubida Laayouni; Morocco	47.50
1989	Zoubida Laayouni; Morocco	51.14	Hanan Ahmed Khaled; Egypt	50.32	Nabila Mouelhi; Tunisia	46.80
1990	Zoubida Laayouni; Morocco	53.10	Hanan Ahmed Khaled; Egypt	49.90	Elizabeth Olaba; Kenya	45.04
1992	Lizette Etsebeth; South Africa	54.84	Nanette van der Walt; South Africa	53.40	Zoubida Laayouni; Morocco	52.74
1993	Lizette Etsebeth; South Africa	54.16	Nanette van der Walt; South Africa	51.58	Sandra Willms; South Africa	50.56
1996	Monia Kari; Tunisia	53.00	Caroline Fournier; Mauritius	48.80	Felicia Nkiru Ojiego; Nigeria	45.58
1998	Elizna Naudé; South Africa	50.28	Caroline Fournier; Mauritius	50.28	Hanan Ahmed Khaled; Egypt	42.82
2000	Monia Kari; Tunisia	58.46	Ndoumbé Gaye; Senegal	50.81	Felicia Nkiru Ojiego; Nigeria	49.65
2002	Monia Kari; Tunisia	55.28	Vivian Chukwuemeka; Nigeria	54.12	Elizna Naudé; South Africa	51.89
2004	Elizna Naudé; South Africa	57.50	Alifatou Djibril; Togo	52.62	Hiba Meshili Abu Zaghari; Egypt	50.58

=== Hammer throw ===
Games	Gold		Silver		Bronze	
1998	Caroline Fournier; Mauritius	54.29	Marwa Ahmed Hussein; Egypt	47.55	Djida Yalloulène; Algeria	47.43
2000	Caroline Fournier; Mauritius	59.60	Marwa Ahmed Hussein; Egypt	57.15	Djida Yalloulène; Algeria	49.72
2002	Marwa Ahmed Hussein; Egypt	61.64	Caroline Fournier; Mauritius	58.39	Hayat El Ghazi; Morocco	58.27
2004	Marwa Ahmed Hussein; Egypt	66.14	Mouna Dani; Morocco	57.98	Hayat El Ghazi; Morocco	57.67

=== Javelin throw ===
Games	Gold		Silver		Bronze	
1979	Agnès Tchuinté; Cameroon	50.20	Eunice Nekesa; Kenya	49.98	Constance Rwabiryagye; Uganda	41.64
1982	Agnès Tchuinté; Cameroon	50.64	Fatiha Belamghar; Morocco	45.86	Eunice Nekesa; Kenya	44.14
1984	Ténin Camara; Ivory Coast	45.48	Samira Benhamza; Morocco	44.90	Naïma Fouad; Morocco	44.40
1985	Agnès Tchuinté; Cameroon	54.00	Samia Djémaa; Algeria	50.50	Samira Benhamza; Morocco	49.32
1988	Yasmina Azzizi; Algeria	48.82	Samia Djémaa; Algeria	45.74	Schola Mujawamaria; Uganda	44.86
1989	Chinweoke Chikwelu; Nigeria	52.18	Milka Johnson; Kenya	50.32	Yasmina Azzizi; Algeria	48.16
1990	Seraphina Nyauma; Kenya	46.82	Matilda Kisava; Tanzania	46.44	Kate Nwani; Nigeria	45.44
1992	Seraphina Nyauma; Kenya	53.02	Liezl Roux; South Africa	52.42	Rhona Dwinger; South Africa	51.28
1993	Liezl Roux; South Africa	48.24	Rhona Dwinger; South Africa	47.60	Michelle Bradbury; South Africa	43.92
1996	Fatma Zouhour Toumi; Tunisia	51.88	Lindy Leveaux; Seychelles	42.24	Monique Djikada; Cameroon	40.78
1998	Lindy Leveaux; Seychelles	47.56	Bernadette Ravina; Mauritius	46.79	Monique Djikada; Cameroon	45.61
2000	Aïda Sellam; Tunisia	53.35	Lindy Leveaux; Seychelles	50.88	Hanaa Salah El Melegi; Egypt	42.31
2002	Aïda Sellam; Tunisia	55.46	Sorochukwu Ihuefo; Nigeria	55.30	Bernadette Ravina; Mauritius	51.49
2004	Sunette Viljoen; South Africa	60.13	Aïda Sellam; Tunisia	54.68	Cecilia Kiplagat; Kenya	48.78

=== Pentathlon ===
Games	Gold		Silver		Bronze	
1979	Bella Bell-Gam; Nigeria	3607	Florence Ochonogor; Nigeria	3524	Julie-Marie Gomis; Senegal	3409

=== Heptathlon ===
Games	Gold		Silver		Bronze	
1982	Chérifa Meskaoui; Morocco	5353	Margaret Bisereko; Uganda	5029	Frida Kiptala; Kenya	4808
1984	Chérifa Meskaoui; Morocco	5448	Frida Kiptala; Kenya	5292	Nacèra Achir; Algeria	5195
1985	Chérifa Meskaoui; Morocco	5294	Nacèra Achir; Algeria	5286	Yasmina Azzizi; Algeria	4909
1988	Yasmina Azzizi; Algeria	5740	Marie-Lourdes Ally Samba; Mauritius	4821	Huda Hashem Ismail; Egypt	4289
1989	Yasmina Azzizi; Algeria	5957	Nacèra Zaaboub (Achir); Algeria	5573	Chinweoke Chikwelu; Nigeria	5503
1990	Albertine Koutouan; Ivory Coast	5065	Huda Hashem Ismail; Egypt	4716	Marie-Lourdes Ally Samba; Mauritius	4501
1992	Chrisna Oosthuizen; South Africa	5056	Caroline Kola; Kenya	4994	Albertine Koutouan; Ivory Coast	4977
1993	Chrisna Oosthuizen; South Africa	5339	Maralize Visser; South Africa	5159	Caroline Kola; Kenya	4925
1996	Caroline Kola; Kenya	5270	Anne-Marie Mouri-Nkeng; Cameroon	4372	Adélaïde Koudougnon; Ivory Coast	3453
1998	Patience Itanyi; Nigeria	5376	Mary Dolly Zé Oyono; Cameroon	5211	Paulette Mendy; Senegal	4716
2000	Yasmina Kettab (Azzizi); Algeria	5837	Maralize Fouché (Visser); South Africa	5726	Patience Itanyi; Nigeria	5611
2002	Margaret Simpson; Ghana	6105w	Stéphanie Domaingue; Mauritius	5206	Imène Chatbri; Tunisia	5103
2004	Margaret Simpson; Ghana	6154	Janice Josephs; South Africa	5785	Céline Laporte; Seychelles	5172

=== 5000 metres track walk ===
Games	Gold		Silver		Bronze	
1988	Sabiha Mansouri; Algeria	25:51.7	Dalila Frihi; Algeria	27:06.2	Kheïra Sadat; Algeria	29:19.3
1989	Agnetha Chelimo; Kenya	26:36.18	Mercy Nyambura; Kenya	27:08.58	only 2 finishers	27:11.6
1990	Agnetha Chelimo; Kenya	25:45.2	Méryem Kouch; Morocco	26:36.7	Amani Mohamed Adel; Egypt	25:45.64
1992	Dounia Kara; Algeria	24:57.02	Maryse Pyndiah; Mauritius	25:11.95	Susan Bingham; South Africa	25:32.68
1993	Dounia Kara; Algeria	24:33.56	Amsale Yakobe; Ethiopia	24:39.04	Felicita Falconer; South Africa	24:05.7
1996	Dounia Kara; Algeria	23:15.8	Nagwa Ibrahim Ali; Egypt	24:05.4	Monica Akoth; Kenya	25:33.11
1998	Nagwa Ibrahim Ali; Egypt	24:28.42	Dounia Kara; Algeria	25:17.17	Anne-Hortense Ebéna; Cameroon	None

=== 10 kilometres road walk ===
Games	Gold		Silver		Bronze	
2000	Bahia Boussad; Algeria	49:33	Nagwa Ibrahim Ali; Egypt	50:15	Dounia Kara; Algeria	50:55
2002	Nagwa Ibrahim Ali; Egypt	49:26	Bahia Boussad; Algeria	49:57	Grace Wanjiru; Kenya	51:35

=== 20 kilometres road walk ===
Games	Gold		Silver		Bronze	
2004	Grace Wanjiru; Kenya	1:42:45	Nicolene Cronjé; South Africa	1:43:57	Bahia Boussad; Algeria	1:46:12

=== 4 × 100 metres relay ===
Games	Gold		Silver		Bronze	
1979	Ghana; Ghana	45.63	Nigeria; Nigeria	46.45	Senegal; Senegal	50.23
1982	Kenya; Kenya	46.77	Ivory Coast; Ivory Coast	47.23	Senegal; Senegal	50.62
1984	Kenya; Kenya	46.18	Ghana; Ghana	46.20	Gambia; Gambia	47.20
1985	Ghana; Ghana	45.08	Nigeria; Nigeria	45.45	Ivory Coast; Ivory Coast	46.98
1988	Ghana; Ghana	44.68	Ivory Coast; Ivory Coast	45.59	Senegal; Senegal	46.45
1989	Nigeria; Nigeria	44.60	Ghana; Ghana	45.40	Ivory Coast; Ivory Coast	46.00
1990	Nigeria; Nigeria	45.06	Ghana; Ghana	45.87	Egypt; Egypt	46.79
1992	South Africa; South Africa	44.53	Nigeria; Nigeria	45.19	Madagascar; Madagascar	45.38
1993	Nigeria; Nigeria	43.49	Madagascar; Madagascar	44.93	South Africa; South Africa	45.15
1996	Cameroon; Cameroon	44.7	Ivory Coast; Ivory Coast	45.5	Senegal; Senegal	46.8
1998	Nigeria; Nigeria	43.75	Madagascar; Madagascar	43.78	Ghana; Ghana	43.89
2000	Ghana; Ghana	43.99	Senegal; Senegal	44.62	Cameroon; Cameroon	46.97
2002	South Africa; South Africa	45.60	Ivory Coast; Ivory Coast	47.15	Ghana; Ghana	47.41
2004	Nigeria; Nigeria	44.32	South Africa; South Africa	44.42	Senegal; Senegal	45.21

=== 4 × 400 metres relay ===
Games	Gold		Silver		Bronze	
1979	Ghana; Ghana	3:41.8a	Kenya; Kenya	3:46.1a	Nigeria; Nigeria	3:54.9a
1982	Kenya; Kenya	3:43.8	Uganda; Uganda	3:44.9	Morocco; Morocco	3:47.4
1984	Kenya; Kenya	3:37.76	Ghana; Ghana	3:45.96	Morocco; Morocco	3:54.41
1985	Nigeria; Nigeria	3:36.13	Kenya; Kenya	3:39.66	Ghana; Ghana	3:42.32
1988	Uganda; Uganda	3:37.74	Ivory Coast; Ivory Coast	3:38.30	Morocco; Morocco	3:50.25
1989	Nigeria; Nigeria	3:33.12	Kenya; Kenya	3:39.60	Ivory Coast; Ivory Coast	3:41.87
1990	Nigeria; Nigeria	3:40.04	Kenya; Kenya	3:45.99	Mauritius; Mauritius	3:46.94
1992	Nigeria; Nigeria	3:33.13	South Africa; South Africa	3:36.19	Mauritius; Mauritius	3:42.68
1993	Nigeria; Nigeria	3:33.21	South Africa; South Africa	3:37.24	Ghana; Ghana	3:39.66
1996	Nigeria; Nigeria	3:39.2	Cameroon; Cameroon	3:40.5	Gabon; Gabon	3:54.8
1998	Nigeria; Nigeria	3:31.07	Senegal; Senegal	3:31.42	Cameroon; Cameroon	3:33.85
2000	Cameroon; Cameroon	3:32.89	Morocco; Morocco	3:42.91	Algeria; Algeria	3:51.01
2002	Cameroon; Cameroon	3:35.33	Nigeria; Nigeria	3:38.25	Algeria; Algeria	3:39.70
2004	Senegal; Senegal	3:29.41	South Africa; South Africa	3:30.12	Cameroon; Cameroon	3:30.77

=== Men's decathlon ===
Games	Gold		Silver		Bronze	
1999	Rédouane Youcef; Algeria	7375	Christo Blignaut; South Africa	7347	Amine Hafed; Algeria	7042
2005	François Potgieter; South Africa	7168	Anis Riahi; Tunisia	7140	Jannie Botha; South Africa	7004

=== Women's heptathlon ===
Games	Gold		Silver		Bronze	
1999	Stéphanie Domaingue; Mauritius	4857	Fatima Zahra Dkouk; Morocco	4742	Zahra Lachgar; Morocco	4715
2005	Sarah Bouaoudia; Algeria	5492	Mona Jabir Ahmed; Sudan	4919	Aïda Chaabane; Tunisia	4747
