= 1985 IAAF World Cup – Results =

These are the full results of the 1985 IAAF World Cup which was held on 4–6 October 1985 at the Bruce Stadium in Canberra, Australia.

== Results ==
=== 100 m ===
==== Men ====
4 October
Wind: -0.4 m/s

| Rank | Athlete | Team | Time | Points | Notes |
|---|---|---|---|---|---|
| 1 | Ben Johnson (CAN) | Americas | 10.00 | 8 | |
| 2 | Chidi Imoh (NGR) | Africa | 10.11 | 7 | |
| 3 | Frank Emmelmann | East Germany | 10.17 | 6 | |
| 4 | Kirk Baptiste | United States | 10.17 | 5 | |
| 5 | Gerrard Keating (AUS) | Oceania | 10.22 | 4 | |
| 6 | Nikolay Yushmanov | Soviet Union | 10.26 | 3 | |
| 7 | Marian Woronin (POL) | Europe | 10.45 | 2 | |
| 8 | Zheng Cheng (CHN) | Asia | 10.48 | 1 | |

==== Women ====
5 October
Wind: -0.6 m/s

| Rank | Athlete | Team | Time | Points | Notes |
|---|---|---|---|---|---|
| 1 | Marlies Göhr | East Germany | 11.10 | 8 | |
| 2 | Grace Jackson (JAM) | Americas | 11.30 | 6.5 | |
| 2 | Marina Zhirova | Soviet Union | 11.30 | 6.5 | |
| 4 | Anelia Nuneva (BUL) | Europe | 11.50 | 5 | |
| 5 | Rufina Ubah (NGR) | Africa | 11.55 | 4 | |
| 6 | Jenny Flaherty (AUS) | Oceania | 11.79 | 3 | |
| 7 | Kathrene Wallace | United States | 11.86 | 2 | |
| 8 | Lee Young-sook (KOR) | Asia | 11.92 | 1 | |

=== 200 m ===
==== Men ====
6 October
Wind: +0.5 m/s

| Rank | Athlete | Team | Time | Points | Notes |
|---|---|---|---|---|---|
| 1 | Robson da Silva (BRA) | Americas | 20.44 | 8 | |
| 2 | Frank Emmelmann | East Germany | 20.44 | 7 | |
| 3 | Darren Clark (AUS) | Australia | 20.78 | 6 | |
| 4 | Jang Jae-keun (KOR) | Asia | 20.90 | 5 | |
| 5 | Carlo Simionato (ITA) | Europe | 21.09 | 4 | |
| 6 | Vladimir Muravyev | Soviet Union | 21.13 | 3 | |
| 7 | Simon Kipkemboi (KEN) | Africa | 21.50 | 2 | |
| | Kirk Baptiste | United States | DQ | 0 | |

==== Women ====
4 October
Wind: -0.7 m/s

| Rank | Athlete | Team | Time | Points | Notes |
|---|---|---|---|---|---|
| 1 | Marita Koch | East Germany | 21.90 | 8 | |
| 2 | Grace Jackson (JAM) | Americas | 22.61 | 7 | |
| 3 | Marina Zhirova | Soviet Union | 22.66 | 6 | |
| 4 | Ewa Kasprzyk (POL) | Europe | 23.05 | 5 | |
| 5 | Pam Marshall | United States | 23.15 | 4 | |
| 6 | Maree Chapman (AUS) | Oceania | 23.71 | 3 | |
| 7 | Rufina Ubah (NGR) | Africa | 24.02 | 2 | |
| 8 | Vandana Rao (IND) | Asia | 24.38 | 1 | |

=== 400 m ===
==== Men ====
5 October

| Rank | Athlete | Team | Time | Points | Notes |
|---|---|---|---|---|---|
| 1 | Michael Franks | United States | 44.47 | 8 | |
| 2 | Thomas Schönlebe | East Germany | 44.72 | 7 | |
| 3 | Innocent Egbunike (NGR) | Africa | 44.99 | 6 | |
| 4 | Darren Clark (AUS) | Oceania | 45.12 | 5 | |
| 5 | Vladimir Krylov | Soviet Union | 45.73 | 4 | |
| 6 | Hector Daley (PAN) | Americas | 46.04 | 3 | |
| 7 | Aldo Canti (FRA) | Europe | 46.21 | 2 | |
| 8 | Mohammed Al-Malki (OMA) | Asia | 47.18 | 1 | |

==== Women ====
4 October

| Rank | Athlete | Team | Time | Points | Notes |
|---|---|---|---|---|---|
| 1 | Marita Koch | East Germany | 47.60 | 8 | WR |
| 2 | Olga Vladykina | Soviet Union | 48.27 | 7 | |
| 3 | Lillie Leatherwood | United States | 50.43 | 6 | |
| 4 | Ana Quirot (CUB) | Americas | 50.86 | 5 | |
| 5 | Jarmila Kratochvílová (TCH) | Europe | 50.95 | 4 | |
| 6 | Debbie Flintoff (AUS) | Oceania | 51.57 | 3 | |
| 7 | Pilavullakandi Usha (IND) | Asia | 51.61 | 2 | |
| 8 | Kehinde Vaughan (NGR) | Africa | 53.16 | 1 | |

=== 800 m ===
==== Men ====
4 October

| Rank | Athlete | Team | Time | Points | Notes |
|---|---|---|---|---|---|
| 1 | Sammy Koskei (KEN) | Africa | 1:45.14 | 8 | |
| 2 | Viktor Kalinkin | Soviet Union | 1:45.72 | 7 | |
| 3 | Agberto Guimarães (BRA) | Americas | 1:45.80 | 6 | |
| 4 | Detlef Wagenknecht | East Germany | 1:45.83 | 5 | |
| 5 | Rob Druppers (NED) | Europe | 1:46.27 | 4 | |
| 6 | John Marshall | United States | 1:47.46 | 3 | |
| 7 | Peter Pearless (NZL) | Oceania | 1:54.15 | 2 | |
| | Batumalai Rajakumar (MAS) | Asia | DNF | 0 | |

==== Women ====
5 October

| Rank | Athlete | Team | Time | Points | Notes |
|---|---|---|---|---|---|
| 1 | Christine Wachtel | East Germany | 2:01.57 | 8 | |
| 2 | Jarmila Kratochvílová (TCH) | Europe | 2:01.99 | 7 | |
| 3 | Nadiya Olizarenko | Soviet Union | 2:02.17 | 6 | |
| 4 | Ana Quirot (CUB) | Americas | 2:03.57 | 5 | |
| 5 | Joetta Clark | United States | 2:03.81 | 4 | |
| 6 | Salina Chirchir (KEN) | Africa | 2:04.16 | 3 | |
| 7 | Wendy Old (AUS) | Oceania | 2:05.36 | 2 | |
| 8 | Shiny Abraham (IND) | Asia | 2:06.39 | 1 | |

=== 1500 m ===
==== Men ====
5 October

| Rank | Athlete | Team | Time | Points | Notes |
|---|---|---|---|---|---|
| 1 | Omer Khalifa (SUD) | Africa | 3:41.16 | 8 | |
| 2 | Olaf Beyer | East Germany | 3:41.26 | 7 | |
| 3 | Igor Lotaryov | Soviet Union | 3:41.92 | 6 | |
| 4 | José Manuel Abascal (ESP) | Europe | 3:42.16 | 5 | |
| 5 | Mike Hillardt (AUS) | Oceania | 3:42.65 | 4 | |
| 6 | Craig Masback | United States | 3:46.54 | 3 | |
| 7 | David Campbell (CAN) | Americas | 3:47.93 | 2 | |
| 8 | Bagicha Singh (IND) | Asia | 3:54.88 | 1 | |

==== Women ====
4 October

| Rank | Athlete | Team | Time | Points | Notes |
|---|---|---|---|---|---|
| 1 | Hildegard Körner | East Germany | 4:10.86 | 8 | |
| 2 | Ravilya Agletdinova | Soviet Union | 4:11.21 | 7 | |
| 3 | Doina Melinte (ROM) | Europe | 4:19.66 | 6 | |
| 4 | Yang Liuxia (CHN) | Asia | 4:20.73 | 5 | |
| 5 | Ulla Marquette (CAN) | Americas | 4:21.25 | 4 | |
| 6 | Mary Chemweno (KEN) | Africa | 4:24.97 | 3 | |
| 7 | Anne McKenzie (NZL) | Oceania | 4:27.33 | 2 | |

=== 5000/3000 m ===
==== Men ====
6 October

| Rank | Athlete | Team | Time | Points | Notes |
|---|---|---|---|---|---|
| 1 | Doug Padilla | United States | 14:04.11 | 8 | |
| 2 | Stefano Mei (ITA) | Europe | 14:05.99 | 7 | |
| 3 | Wodajo Bulti (ETH) | Africa | 14:07.17 | 6 | |
| 4 | Frank Heine | East Germany | 14:07.60 | 5 | |
| 5 | Aleksandr Khudyakov | Soviet Union | 14:10.35 | 4 | |
| 6 | Dean Crowe (NZL) | Oceania | 14:11.32 | 3 | |
| 7 | Mauricio González (MEX) | Americas | 14:11.78 | 2 | |
| 8 | Kozu Akutsu (JPN) | Asia | 14:12.72 | 1 | |

==== Women ====
6 October

| Rank | Athlete | Team | Time | Points | Notes |
|---|---|---|---|---|---|
| 1 | Ulrike Bruns | East Germany | 9:14.65 | 8 | |
| 2 | Tatyana Pozdnyakova | Soviet Union | 9:15.65 | 7 | |
| 3 | Cindy Bremser | United States | 9:21.15 | 6 | |
| 4 | Sharon Dalton (AUS) | Oceania | 9:27.34 | 5 | |
| 5 | Li Xiuxia (CHN) | Asia | 9:31.80 | 4 | |
| 6 | Hellen Kimaiyo (KEN) | Africa | 9:33.41 | 3 | |
| 7 | Geri Fitch (CAN) | Americas | 9:46.68 | 2 | |
| 8 | Monika Schäfer (FRG) | Europe | 10:03.47 | 1 | |

=== 10,000 m ===
==== Men ====
4 October

| Rank | Athlete | Team | Time | Points | Notes |
|---|---|---|---|---|---|
| 1 | Wodajo Bulti (ETH) | Africa | 29:22.96 | 8 | |
| 2 | Pat Porter | United States | 29:23.02 | 7 | |
| 3 | Werner Schildhauer | East Germany | 29:25.63 | 6 | |
| 4 | Martín Pitayo (MEX) | Americas | 29:35.85 | 5 | |
| 5 | Vincent Rousseau (BEL) | Europe | 29:53.23 | 4 | |
| 6 | Rex Wilson (NZL) | Oceania | 30:06.23 | 3 | |
| 7 | Gennadiy Temnikov | Soviet Union | 30:09.94 | 2 | |
| 8 | Zhang Guowei (CHN) | Asia | 30:26.58 | 1 | |

==== Women ====
5 October

| Rank | Athlete | Team | Time | Points | Notes |
|---|---|---|---|---|---|
| 1 | Aurora Cunha (POR) | Europe | 32:07.50 | 8 | |
| 2 | Mary Knisely | United States | 32:19.93 | 7 | |
| 3 | Olga Bondarenko | Soviet Union | 32:27.70 | 6 | |
| 4 | Ines Bibernell | East Germany | 32:45.58 | 5 | |
| 5 | Hassania Darami (MAR) | Africa | 33:46.69 | 4 | |
| 6 | Mónica Regonesi (CHI) | Americas | 34:04.42 | 3 | |
| | Yuko Gordon (HKG) | Asia | DNF | 0 | |
| | Lisa Martin (AUS) | Oceania | DNF | 0 | |

=== 110/100 m hurdles ===
==== Men ====
6 October
Wind: +3.1 m/s

| Rank | Athlete | Team | Time | Points | Notes |
|---|---|---|---|---|---|
| 1 | Tonie Campbell | United States | 13.35 | 8 | |
| 2 | Sergey Usov | Soviet Union | 13.62 | 7 | |
| 3 | Jörg Naumann | East Germany | 13.76 | 6 | |
| 4 | Don Wright (AUS) | Oceania | 13.79 | 5 | |
| 5 | Yu Zhicheng (CHN) | Asia | 13.83 | 3.5 | |
| 5 | György Bakos (HUN) | Europe | 13.83 | 3.5 | |
| 7 | René Djédjémel (CIV) | Africa | 14.20 | 2 | |
| 8 | Jesús Aguilasocho (MEX) | Americas | 14.64 | 1 | |

==== Women ====
5 October
Wind: -1.8 m/s

| Rank | Athlete | Team | Time | Points | Notes |
|---|---|---|---|---|---|
| 1 | Cornelia Oschkenat | East Germany | 12.72 | 8 | |
| 2 | Ginka Zagorcheva (BUL) | Europe | 12.72 | 7 | |
| 3 | Svetlana Gusarova | Soviet Union | 13.01 | 6 | |
| 4 | Liu Huajin (HUN) | Asia | 13.20 | 5 | |
| 5 | Glynis Nunn (AUS) | Oceania | 13.25 | 4 | |
| 6 | Maria Usifo (NGR) | Africa | 13.34 | 3 | |
| 7 | Pam Page | United States | 13.49 | 2 | |
| 8 | Cecilia Branch (CAN) | Americas | 13.75 | 1 | |

=== 400 m hurdles ===
==== Men ====
4 October

| Rank | Athlete | Team | Time | Points | Notes |
|---|---|---|---|---|---|
| 1 | Andre Phillips | United States | 48.42 | 8 | |
| 2 | Aleksandr Vasilyev | Soviet Union | 48.61 | 7 | |
| 3 | Harald Schmid (FRG) | Europe | 48.83 | 6 | |
| 4 | Amadou Dia Ba (SEN) | Africa | 48.98 | 5 | |
| 5 | Hans-Jürgen Ende | East Germany | 50.22 | 4 | |
| 6 | Ahmed Hamada (BHR) | Asia | 50.63 | 3 | |
| 7 | Pedro Chiamulera (BRA) | Americas | 51.44 | 2 | |
| 8 | Wayne Paul (NZL) | Oceania | 52.15 | 1 | |

==== Women ====
4 October

| Rank | Athlete | Team | Time | Points | Notes |
|---|---|---|---|---|---|
| 1 | Sabine Busch | East Germany | 54.44 | 8 | |
| 2 | Judi Brown King | United States | 55.10 | 7 | |
| 3 | Debbie Flintoff (AUS) | Oceania | 55.34 | 6 | |
| 4 | Nawal El Moutawakel (MAR) | Africa | 56.05 | 5 | |
| 5 | P.T. Usha (IND) | Asia | 56.35 | 4 | |
| 6 | Margarita Khromova | Soviet Union | 56.90 | 3 | |
| 7 | Genowefa Błaszak (POL) | Europe | 57.50 | 2 | |
| 8 | Gwen Wall (CAN) | Americas | 58.13 | 1 | |

=== 3000 m steeplechase ===
==== Men ====
5 October

| Rank | Athlete | Team | Time | Points | Notes |
|---|---|---|---|---|---|
| 1 | Julius Kariuki (KEN) | Africa | 8:39.51 | 8 | |
| 2 | Henry Marsh | United States | 8:39.55 | 7 | |
| 3 | Graeme Fell (CAN) | Americas | 8:40.30 | 6 | |
| 4 | Ivan Konovalov | Soviet Union | 8:41.46 | 5 | |
| 5 | Hagen Melzer | East Germany | 8:42.92 | 4 | |
| 6 | Joseph Mahmoud (FRA) | Europe | 8:50.86 | 3 | |
| 7 | Peter Renner (NZL) | Oceania | 8:54.96 | 2 | |
| 8 | Shigeyuki Aikyo (JPN) | Asia | 8:55.35 | 1 | |

=== 4 × 100 m relay ===
==== Men ====
5 October

| Rank | Team | Athletes | Time | Points | Notes |
|---|---|---|---|---|---|
| 1 | United States | Harvey Glance, Kirk Baptiste, Calvin Smith, Dwayne Evans | 38.10 | 8 | |
| 2 | Americas | Desai Williams (CAN), Robson da Silva (BRA), Leandro Peñalver (CUB), Ben Johnson (CAN) | 38.31 | 7 | |
| 3 | Soviet Union | Nikolay Yushmanov, Aleksandr Semyonov, Aleksandr Yevgenyev, Vladimir Muravyov | 38.35 | 6 | |
| 4 | East Germany | Heiko Truppel, Steffen Bringmann, Torsten Heimrath, Frank Emmelmann | 38.39 | 5 | |
| 5 | Europe | Antonio Ullo (ITA), Stefano Tilli (ITA), Pierfrancesco Pavoni (ITA), Carlo Simionato (ITA) | 38.76 | 4 | |
| 6 | Oceania | Rob Stone (AUS), Peter Van Miltenburg (AUS), Clayton Kearney (AUS), Gerrard Keating (AUS) | 39.35 | 3 | |
| 7 | Africa | Victor Edet (NGR), Ikpoto Eseme (NGR), Iziaq Adeyanju (NGR), Chidi Imoh (NGR) | 39.55 | 2 | |
| 8 | Asia | Li Feng (CHN), Cai Jianming (CHN), Yu Zhuanghui (CHN), Zheng Cheng (CHN) | 39.74 | 1 | |

==== Women ====
6 October

| Rank | Team | Athletes | Time | Points | Notes |
|---|---|---|---|---|---|
| 1 | East Germany | Silke Gladisch, Sabine Rieger, Ingrid Auerswald, Marlies Göhr | 41.37 | 8 | WR |
| 2 | Soviet Union | Antonina Nastoburko, Natalya Bochina, Marina Zhirova, Elvira Barbashina | 42.54 | 7 | |
| 3 | Europe | Iwona Pakuła (POL), Ginka Zagorcheva (BUL), Ewa Pisiewicz (POL), Ewa Kasprzyk (POL) | 43.38 | 6 | |
| 4 | Americas | Angela Phipps (CAN), Grace Jackson (JAM), Esmie Lawrence (CAN), Molly Killingbeck (CAN) | 43.39 | 5 | |
| 5 | United States | Pam Page, Susan Shurr, Ella Smith, Pam Marshall | 44.03 | 4 | |
| 6 | Africa | Grace Armah (GHA), Doris Wiredu (GHA), Cynthia Quartey (GHA), Martha Appiah (GHA) | 44.76 | 3 | |
| 7 | Asia | Zhang Jianmei (CHN), Pan Weixin (CHN), Tian Yumei (CHN), Liu Huajin (CHN) | 45.16 | 2 | |
| | Oceania | Kerry Johnson (AUS), Maree Chapman (AUS), Jenny Flaherty (AUS), Andrea Wade (NZL) | DQ | 0 | |

=== 4 × 400 m relay ===
==== Men ====
6 October

| Rank | Team | Athletes | Time | Points | Notes |
|---|---|---|---|---|---|
| 1 | United States | Walter McCoy, Andre Phillips, Ray Armstead, Mike Franks | 3:00.71 | 8 | |
| 2 | East Germany | Frank Möller, Mathias Schersing, Guido Lieske, Thomas Schönlebe | 3:00.82 | 7 | |
| 3 | Oceania | Bruce Frayne (AUS), Gary Minihan (AUS), Alan Ozolins (AUS), Darren Clark (AUS) | 3:01.35 | 6 | |
| 4 | Europe | Pierfrancesco Pavoni (ITA), Klaus Just (FRG), Jörg Vaihinger (FRG), Ángel Heras (ESP) | 3:01.46 | 5 | |
| 5 | Soviet Union | Aleksandr Troshchilo, Aleksandr Vasilyev, Vladimir Prosin, Vladimir Krylov | 3:03.17 | 4 | |
| 6 | Americas | Leandro Peñalver (CUB), Ian Morris (TRI), Héctor Daley (PAN), Roberto Hernández (CUB) | 3:03.52 | 3 | |
| 7 | Asia | Takeo Suzuki (JPN), Abdul Yussouf (IRQ), Hiromi Kawasumi (JPN), Mohammed Al-Malki (OMA) | 3:10.20 | 2 | |
| | Africa | Sunday Uti (NGR), David Kitur (KEN), Gabriel Tiacoh (CIV), Innocent Egbunike (NGR) | DQ | 0 | |

==== Women ====
4 October

| Rank | Team | Athletes | Time | Points | Notes |
|---|---|---|---|---|---|
| 1 | East Germany | Kirsten Emmelmann, Sabine Busch, Dagmar Neubauer, Marita Koch | 3:19.49 | 8 | |
| 2 | Soviet Union | Tatyana Alekseyeva, Irina Nazarova, Mariya Pinigina, Olga Vladykina | 3:20.60 | 7 | |
| 3 | Europe | Rositsa Stamenova (BUL), Erica Rossi (ITA), Alena Bulirová (TCH), Jarmila Kratochvílová (TCH) | 3:28.47 | 6 | |
| 4 | Americas | Norfalia Carabalí (COL), Jocelyn Joseph (ATG), Molly Killingbeck (CAN), Ana Quirot (CUB) | 3:29.34 | 5 | |
| 5 | United States | Susan Shurr, Judi Brown King, Roberta Belle, Lillie Leatherwood | 3:30.99 | 4 | |
| 6 | Oceania | Sharon Stewart (AUS), Andrea Wade (NZL), Maree Chapman (AUS), Debbie Flintoff-King (AUS) | 3:35.93 | 3 | |
| 7 | Africa | Nawal El Moutawakel (MAR), Airat Bakare (NGR), Kehinde Vaughan (NGR), Doris Wiredu (GHA) | 3:36.86 | 2 | |
| 8 | Asia | Vandana Rao (IND), Emma Tahapary (IND), Shiny Abraham (IND), P.T. Usha (IND) | 3:37.59 | 1 | |

=== High jump ===
==== Men ====
6 October

| Rank | Athlete | Team | Result | Points | Notes |
|---|---|---|---|---|---|
| 1 | Patrik Sjöberg (SWE) | Europe | 2.31 | 8 | |
| 2 | James Howard | United States | 2.28 | 7 | |
| 3 | Javier Sotomayor (CUB) | Americas | 2.28 | 6 | |
| 4 | Igor Paklin | Soviet Union | 2.25 | 5 | |
| 5 | Andreas Sam | East Germany | 2.20 | 4 | |
| 6 | Shuji Ujino (JPN) | Asia | 2.15 | 3 | |
| 7 | Moussa Sagna Fall (SEN) | Senegal | 2.10 | 2 | |
| 8 | John Atkinson (AUS) | Oceania | 2.10 | 1 | |

==== Women ====
4 October

| Rank | Athlete | Team | Result | Points | Notes |
|---|---|---|---|---|---|
| 1 | Stefka Kostadinova (BUL) | Europe | 2.00 | 8 | |
| 2 | Tamara Bykova | Soviet Union | 1.97 | 7 | |
| 3 | Susanne Helm | East Germany | 1.97 | 6 | |
| 4 | Silvia Costa (CUB) | Americas | 1.97 | 5 | |
| 5 | Christine Stanton (AUS) | Oceania | 1.88 | 4 | |
| 6 | Yang Wenqin (CHN) | Asia | 1.85 | 3 | |
| 7 | Coleen Sommer | United States | 1.80 | 2 | |
| 8 | Awa Dioum-Ndiaye (SEN) | Africa | 1.70 | 1 | |

=== Pole vault ===
==== Men ====
5 October

| Rank | Athlete | Team | Result | Points | Notes |
|---|---|---|---|---|---|
| 1 | Sergey Bubka | Soviet Union | 5.85 | 8 | |
| 2 | Philippe Collet (FRA) | Europe | 5.60 | 7 | |
| 3 | Tim Bright | United States | 5.40 | 6 | |
| 4 | Ji Zebiao (CHN) | Asia | 5.20 | 5 | |
| 5 | Christoph Pietz | East Germany | 5.20 | 4 | |
| 6 | Neil Honey (AUS) | Oceania | 4.70 | 3 | |
| 7 | Choukri Abahnini (TUN) | Africa | 4.50 | 2 | |
| | Rubén Camino (CUB) | Americas | NM | 0 | |

=== Long jump ===
==== Men ====
5 October

| Rank | Athlete | Team | Result | Points | Notes |
|---|---|---|---|---|---|
| 1 | Mike Conley | United States | 8.20 | 8 | |
| 2 | Robert Emmiyan | Soviet Union | 8.09 | 7 | |
| 3 | László Szalma (HUN) | Europe | 8.09 | 6 | |
| 4 | Gary Honey (AUS) | Oceania | 7.98 | 5 | |
| 5 | Liu Yuhuang (CHN) | Asia | 7.98 | 4 | |
| 6 | Ubaldo Duany (CUB) | Americas | 7.87 | 3 | |
| 7 | Uwe Lange | East Germany | 7.76 | 2 | |
| 8 | Paul Emordi (NGR) | Africa | 7.63 | 1 | |

==== Women ====
6 October

| Rank | Athlete | Team | Result | Points | Notes |
|---|---|---|---|---|---|
| 1 | Heike Drechsler | East Germany | 7.27 | 8 | |
| 2 | Galina Chistyakova | Soviet Union | 7.00 | 7 | |
| 3 | Carol Lewis | United States | 6.88 | 6 | |
| 4 | Robyn Lorraway (AUS) | Oceania | 6.80 | 5 | |
| 5 | Sabine Braun (FRG) | Europe | 6.62 | 4 | |
| 6 | Shonel Ferguson (BAH) | Americas | 6.53w | 3 | |
| 7 | Huang Donghuo (CHN) | Asia | 6.29 | 2 | |
| 8 | Marianne Mendoza (SEN) | Africa | 5.40 | 1 | |

=== Triple jump ===
==== Men ====
4 October

| Rank | Athlete | Team | Result | Points | Notes |
|---|---|---|---|---|---|
| 1 | Willie Banks | United States | 17.58 | 8 | |
| 2 | Oleg Protsenko | Soviet Union | 17.47 | 7 | |
| 3 | Khristo Markov (BUL) | Europe | 17.13 | 6 | |
| 4 | Volker Mai | East Germany | 17.07 | 5 | |
| 5 | Paul Emordi (NGR) | Africa | 16.89 | 4 | |
| 6 | Lázaro Balcindes (CUB) | Americas | 16.74w | 3 | |
| 7 | Tian Hongxin (CHN) | Asia | 16.49 | 2 | |
| 8 | Peter Beames (AUS) | Oceania | 16.12 | 1 | |

=== Shot put ===
==== Men ====
5 October

| Rank | Athlete | Team | Result | Points | Notes |
|---|---|---|---|---|---|
| 1 | Ulf Timmermann | East Germany | 22.00 | 8 | |
| 2 | Sergey Smirnov | Soviet Union | 21.72 | 7 | |
| 3 | Alessandro Andrei (ITA) | Europe | 21.14 | 6 | |
| 4 | Dave Laut | United States | 20.51 | 5 | |
| 5 | Gert Weil (CHI) | Americas | 19.50 | 4 | |
| 6 | Mohammed Achouche (EGY) | Africa | 18.41 | 3 | |
| 7 | Balwinder Singh (IND) | Asia | 17.11 | 2 | |
| 8 | Wayne Barber (AUS) | Oceania | 16.15 | 1 | |

==== Women ====
4 October

| Rank | Athlete | Team | Result | Points | Notes |
|---|---|---|---|---|---|
| 1 | Natalya Lisovskaya | Soviet Union | 20.69 | 8 | |
| 2 | Heike Hartwig | East Germany | 19.98 | 7 | |
| 3 | Helena Fibingerová (TCH) | Europe | 19.17 | 6 | |
| 4 | Gael Martin (AUS) | Oceania | 18.04 | 5 | |
| 5 | Cong Yuzhen (CHN) | Asia | 17.83 | 4 | |
| 6 | Ramona Pagel | United States | 17.31 | 3 | |
| 7 | Rosa Fernández (CUB) | Americas | 16.65 | 2 | |
| 8 | Souad Maloussi (MAR) | Africa | 15.80 | 1 | |

=== Discus throw ===
==== Men ====
4 October

| Rank | Athlete | Team | Result | Points | Notes |
|---|---|---|---|---|---|
| 1 | Georgiy Kolnootchenko | Soviet Union | 69.08 | 8 | CR |
| 2 | Jürgen Schult | East Germany | 68.30 | 7 | |
| 3 | Luis Delís (CUB) | Americas | 67.60 | 6 | |
| 4 | Imrich Bugár (TCH) | Europe | 62.96 | 5 | |
| 5 | John Powell | United States | 62.82 | 4 | |
| 6 | Paul Nandapi (AUS) | Oceania | 58.84 | 3 | |
| 7 | Ahmed Kamel Shata (EGY) | Africa | 35.74 | 2 | |
| | Li Weinan (CHN) | Asia | DNS | 0 | |

==== Women ====
6 October

| Rank | Athlete | Team | Result | Points | Notes |
|---|---|---|---|---|---|
| 1 | Martina Opitz | East Germany | 69.78 | 8 | |
| 2 | Galina Savinkova | Soviet Union | 67.30 | 7 | |
| 3 | Maritza Martén (CUB) | Americas | 66.54 | 6 | |
| 4 | Tsvetanka Khristova (BUL) | Europe | 61.90 | 5 | |
| 5 | Li Xiaohui (CHN) | Asia | 57.74 | 4 | |
| 6 | Carol Cady | United States | 56.52 | 3 | |
| 7 | Sue Reinwald (AUS) | Oceania | 53.92 | 2 | |
| 8 | Zoubida Laayouni (MAR) | Africa | 49.68 | 1 | |

=== Hammer throw ===
==== Men ====
5 October

| Rank | Athlete | Team | Result | Points | Notes |
|---|---|---|---|---|---|
| 1 | Jüri Tamm | Soviet Union | 82.12 | 8 | |
| 2 | Günther Rodehau | East Germany | 78.44 | 7 | |
| 3 | Jud Logan | United States | 76.68 | 6 | |
| 4 | František Vrbka (TCH) | Europe | 71.62 | 5 | |
| 5 | Hakim Toumi (ALG) | Africa | 69.84 | 4 | |
| 6 | Hans-Martin Lotz (AUS) | Oceania | 67.30 | 3 | |
| 7 | Francisco Soria (CUB) | Americas | 62.38 | 2 | |
| 8 | Raghubir Singh Bal (IND) | Asia | 60.92 | 1 | |

=== Javelin throw ===
==== Men ====
6 October

| Rank | Athlete | Team | Result | Points | Notes |
|---|---|---|---|---|---|
| 1 | Uwe Hohn | East Germany | 96.96 | 8 | |
| 2 | Heino Puuste | Soviet Union | 87.40 | 7 | |
| 3 | Tom Petranoff | United States | 87.34 | 6 | |
| 4 | David Ottley (GBR) | Europe | 87.00 | 5 | |
| 5 | John Stapylton-Smith (NZL) | Oceania | 76.94 | 4 | |
| 6 | Michael Mahovlich (CAN) | Americas | 76.14 | 3 | |
| 7 | Pubu Ciren (CHN) | Asia | 75.46 | 2 | |
| 8 | Ahmed Mahour Bacha (ALG) | Africa | 72.72 | 1 | |

==== Women ====
4 October

| Rank | Athlete | Team | Result | Points | Notes |
|---|---|---|---|---|---|
| 1 | Olga Gavrilova | Soviet Union | 66.80 | 8 | |
| 2 | Petra Felke | East Germany | 66.22 | 7 | |
| 3 | Fatima Whitbread (GBR) | Europe | 65.12 | 6 | |
| 4 | Sue Howland (AUS) | Oceania | 63.58 | 5 | |
| 5 | Agnès Tchuinté (CMR) | Africa | 57.86 | 4 | |
| 6 | Zhu Hongyang (CHN) | Asia | 55.90 | 3 | |
| 7 | María Caridad Colón (CUB) | Americas | 54.00 | 2 | |
| 8 | Cathy Sulinski | United States | 53.78 | 1 | |
