= Adeyanju =

- Gender: Male
- Language: Yoruba

Origin
- Origin: Nigerian
- Region of origin: South -West Nigeria

Adéyanjú is a name of Yoruba origin meaning "the crown or royalty is complete". Notable people with the surname include:

- Iziaq Adeyanju (born 1959), Nigerian sprinter
- Victor Adeyanju (born 1983), American football player
