= Wiredu =

Wiredu is a surname. Notable people with the surname include:

- Brendan Wiredu (born 1999), English footballer
- Doris Wiredu (born 1964), Ghanaian track and field athlete
- Edward Kwame Wiredu (c. 1936–2008), Chief Justice of Ghana between 2001 and 2003
- Kwadwo Baah Wiredu (1952–2008), Ghanaian politician and a Chartered Accountant
- Kwasi Wiredu (1931–2022), African philosopher
- Murphy Wiredu (born 1985), Canadian former soccer player
