= Choukri Abahnini =

Tunisian pole vaulter (born 1960)

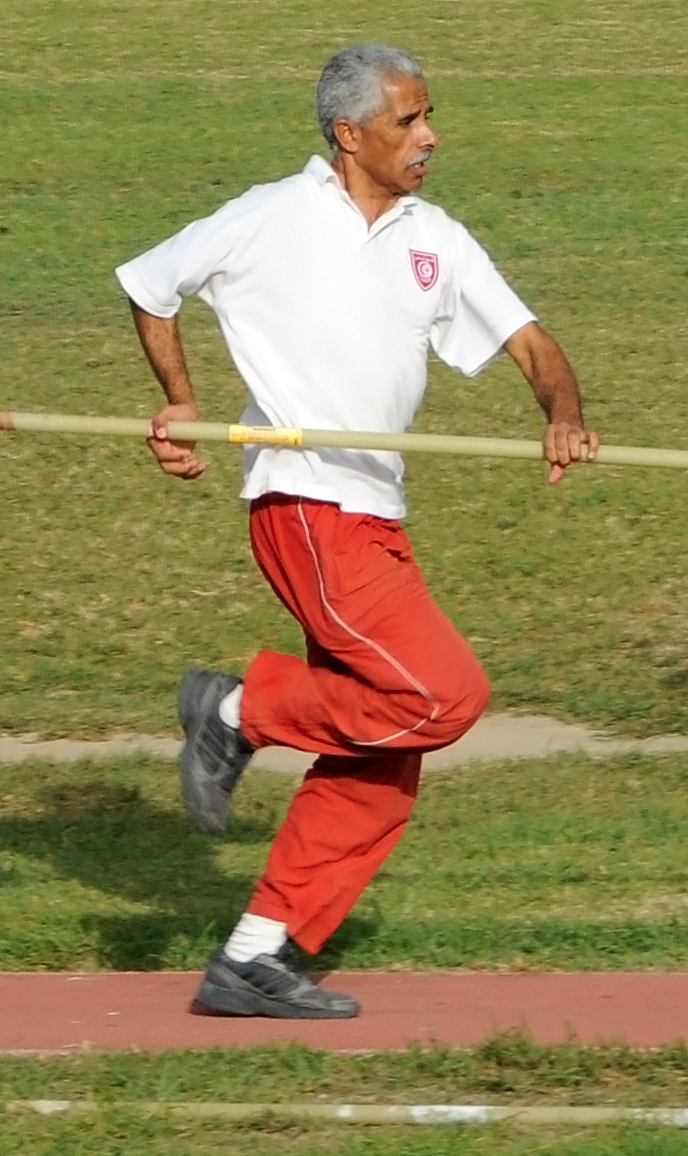

Medal record

Men's athletics

Representing Tunisia

African Games
Gold medal – first place	1987 Nairobi	Pole vault

African Championships
Gold medal – first place	1985 Cairo	Pole vault
Gold medal – first place	1988 Annaba	Pole vault
Bronze medal – third place	1984 Rabat	Pole vault

Choukri Abahnini (born 1960) is a former athlete from Tunisia who competed in the pole vault.

He competed for Tunisia in the 1984 African Championships held in Rabat, Morocco in the pole vault finishing in the bronze medal position with a performance of 4.40 m. At the following years African Championships held in Cairo, Egypt he improved this 4m60 enough to win the gold. A feat he repeated at both the 1987 African Games held in Nairobi, Kenya and 1988 African Championships held in Annaba, Algeria with vaults of 4.90 m and 4.85 m respectively.

== International competitions ==
Year	Competition	Venue	Position	Event	Notes
Representing Tunisia
1983	Maghreb Championships	Casablanca	2nd	Pole vault	4.50 m (14 ft 9 in)
1983	Arab Championships	Amman	2nd	Pole vault	4.50 m (14 ft 9 in)
1984	African Championships	Rabat	3rd	Pole vault	4.40 m (14 ft 5 in)
1985	African Championships	Cairo	1st	Pole vault	4.60 m (15 ft 1 in)
1985	World Cup	Canberra	7th	Pole vault	4.50 m (14 ft 9 in)^{1}
1986	Maghreb Championships	Tunis	1st	Pole vault	4.83 m (15 ft 10 in)
1987	All-Africa Games	Nairobi	1st	Pole vault	4.85 m (15 ft 11 in)
1987	Arab Championships	Algiers	2nd	Pole vault	4.70 m (15 ft 5 in)
1988	African Championships	Annaba	1st	Pole vault	4.90 m (16 ft 1 in)
1989	Arab Championships	Cairo	3rd	Pole vault	4.70 m (15 ft 5 in)

^{1}Representing Africa
