= Rose Aboaje =

Nigerian sprinter

Personal information
- Nationality: Nigerian
- Born: Rose Aboaje; 1977 (age 48–49) Nigeria
- Height: 163 cm (5 ft 4 in)
- Weight: 58 kg (128 lb)

Sport
- Country: Nigeria
- Sport: Athletics
- Event(s): 100 metres, 200 metres
Medal record
Women's athletics
Representing Nigeria
African Championships
Gold medal – first place	1998 Dakar	4×100 m
Silver medal – second place	1998 Dakar	200 m
Bronze medal – third place	1998 Dakar	100 m

Rose Aboaje (born 1977) is a Nigerian former sprinter who competed for Nigeria at national and international athletics competitions. She won the bronze and silver medals in the 100 metres and 200 metres events at the 1998 African Championships in Athletics.

== International competitions ==
Year	Competition	Venue	Position	Event	Notes
Representing Nigeria
1998	African Championships	Dakar, Senegal	3rd	100 m	11.31
1998	African Championships	Dakar, Senegal	2nd	200 m	22.83
1998	World Cup	Johannesburg, South Africa	4th	4 × 100 m	42.91
1999	All-Africa Games	Johannesburg, South Africa	5th (sf)	200 m	23.73

== Personal bests ==
- 100 metres – 11.31 (1998)
- 200 metres – 22.83 (1998)

== See also ==
- List of African Championships in Athletics medalists (women)
