= Moussa Fall =

Senegalese runner

Personal information
- Born: 28 August 1963 (age 62) Saint-Louis, Senegal

Sport
- Sport: Track and field
Medal record
Representing Senegal
African Championships
Gold medal – first place	1984 Rabat	4×400 m
Silver medal – second place	1982 Cairo	4×400 m
Silver medal – second place	1984 Rabat	800 m
Silver medal – second place	1985 Cairo	800 m
Bronze medal – third place	1985 Cairo	4×400 m
Summer Universiade
Silver medal – second place	1987 Zagreb	800m

Moussa Fall (born 28 August 1963) is a retired Senegalese runner who specialized in the 400 and 800 metres.

He was born in Saint-Louis, Senegal. He competed at the 1983 World Championships (400), the 1984 Olympic Games (800), the 1987 World Championships (800) and the 1988 Olympic Games without reaching the final. He also competed in the 4 × 400 metres relay at the 1983 World Championships, the 1984 Olympic Games and the 1988 Olympic Games, but the team never reached the final.

He won a silver medal at the 1987 Summer Universiade.

Regionally, he won silver medals at the 1984 and 1985 African Championships, a gold medal at the 1989 Jeux de la Francophonie.

His personal best time was 47.34 seconds in the 400 metres (1989) and 1:44.06 minutes in the 800 metres (1988).
