= Sammy Koskei =

Kenyan middle-distance runner

Medal record

Men's athletics

Representing Kenya

African Championships
| Gold medal – first place | 1984 Rabat | 800 m |
| Gold medal – first place | 1985 Cairo | 800 m |

Sammy Koskei (born 14 May 1961) is a former Kenyan middle distance runner who specialized in the 800 metres.

Koskei was one of the best Kenyan 800m competitors in the 1980s, setting fast times, but lacked success at the international major championships. His breakthrough year was 1982 when the youngster broke 1:45 second barrier for the first time in his career. That same year he made the 800m final at the Commonwealth Games in Brisbane, but finished a distant last. The same fate befell Sammy at the World Championships in Helsinki in 1983, this time in the preliminaries.

A year later, Koskei won his first title in the 800m at the African Championships in Rabat. However, he found it difficult to represent his country at international competitions due to the great depth of Kenyan talents and failed to reach the final at the Olympic Games in Los Angeles in 1984. On 26 August 1984 he ran the 800 metres in 1:42.28 minutes, finishing second behind Joaquim Cruz who won the race in 1:41.77. These times were the two fastest times in the world that season, and moreover, the second and third fastest times in history at the time, behind Sebastian Coe.

In 1985, Koskei retained his African 800m title at championships in Cairo and had another successful European circuit season recording 8th fastest time in the World in 1985 with a time of 1:43.78min. On 30 August, at Brussels, he won the 1000 metres with a superb time of 2:14.95 min. In October, he represented Africa at the World Cup in Canberra and won 800m race easily in a time of 1:45.14 min.

He stayed very competitive in future years, but missed selection at 1987 World Championships in Rome when finished 4th at Kenyan trials. In 1988, Koskei was still 9th fastest 800m runner in the World with his season's best of 1:44.06 min, but once again he narrowly missed the place at the Kenyan team for the Olympic Games in Seoul finishing 4th at Kenyan trials. He competed for several more years often accepting pacemaking role.

Since Wilson Kipketer represented Denmark when he set his world record, Koskei's 1:42.28 was the African record, that lasted for 25 years until 2009 when David Rudisha of Kenya posted a faster time (1:42.01).

He is from Arwos, Nandi District. After retirement, he has been a sports administrator, and a farmer in Kapsabet.

Koskei competed for the SMU Mustangs track and field team in the 1980s, winning multiple NCAA DI titles in the 800 m. In 1982, the Kenyan government provided information to Southern Methodist University and its conference that "bears upon the issue of Koskei's age and eligibility". SMU argued Kosgei was 20, but rival coaches claimed he was 24 years old, which was too old to compete according to NCAA rules at the time. In light of the evidence presented, Kosgei was declared immediately ineligible.

== Achievements ==
| Year | Competition | Venue | Position | Event | Notes |
Representing Kenya
| 1984 | African Championships | Rabat, Morocco | 1st | 800 m | 1:45.17 |
