= Joshua Kipkemboi =

Kenyan athletics competitor

Personal information
- Born: 22 February 1959 (age 67)

Sport
- Sport: Athletics
- Event: 3000 m steeplechase
Medal record
Men's athletics
Representing Kenya
African Championships
| Gold medal – first place | 1984 Rabat | 3000 m st. |
| Silver medal – second place | 1985 Cairo | 3000 m st. |
| Bronze medal – third place | 1982 Cairo | 3000 m st. |

Joshua Kipkemboi (born 22 February 1959) is a retired Kenyan athlete who specialised in the 3000 metres steeplechase. He represented his country at the 1987 World Championships reaching the final where he failed to finish the race. In addition, he won the silver medal at the 1990 Commonwealth Games in addition to multiple medals at the continental level.

His personal best in the event is 8:14.13 set in Koblenz in 1986.

== International competitions ==
| Year | Competition | Venue | Position | Event | Notes |
Representing Kenya
| 1982 | African Championships | Cairo, Egypt | 3rd | 3000 m s'chase | 8:33.40 |
| 1984 | African Championships | Rabat, Morocco | 1st | 3000 m s'chase | 8:27.88 |
| 1985 | African Championships | Cairo, Egypt | 2nd | 3000 m s'chase | 8:21.70 |
| 1987 | All-Africa Games | Nairobi, Kenya | 2nd | 3000 m s'chase | 8:45.94 |
| 1987 | World Championships | Rome, Italy | 8th (h) | 3000 m s'chase | 8:20.75^{1} |
| 1990 | Commonwealth Games | Auckland, New Zealand | 2nd | 3000 m s'chase | 8:24.26 |

^{1}Did not finish in the final

== Personal bests ==
Outdoor

- 1500 metres – 3:38.4 (Kisumu 1989)
- 3000 metres – 7:48.19 (Seville 1988)
- 5000 metres – 13:39.8 (Koblenz 1983)
- 3000 metres steeplechase – 8:14.13 (Koblenz 1986)
- Marathon – 2:11:45 (St. Paul 2002)
