= Hakim Toumi =

Algerian hammer thrower

Personal information
- Native name: الحكيم التومي
- Nationality: Algerian
- Born: 30 January 1961 (age 65) Algiers

Sport
- Country: Algeria
- Sport: Hammer throw

Achievements and titles
- Personal best: 74.76 metres (245.3 ft) (1998)
Medal record
Men's athletics
Representing Algeria
African Championships
| Gold medal – first place | 1984 Rabat | Hammer throw |
| Gold medal – first place | 1985 Cairo | Hammer throw |
| Gold medal – first place | 1988 Annaba | Hammer throw |
| Gold medal – first place | 1989 Lagos | Hammer throw |
| Gold medal – first place | 1992 Belle Vue Harel | Hammer throw |
| Gold medal – first place | 1993 Durban | Hammer throw |
| Gold medal – first place | 1996 Yaoundé | Hammer throw |
| Silver medal – second place | 1998 Dakar | Hammer throw |
| Bronze medal – third place | 1990 Cairo | Hammer throw |

Hakim Toumi OLY (Arabic: الحكيم التومي; born 30 January 1961) is a retired male hammer thrower from Algeria.

Toumi twice represented his native country at the Summer Olympics, in 1984 and 1988. He set his personal best distance of 74.76 metres (245.3 ft) on 8 August 1998 in Algiers.

== International competitions ==
| Year | Competition | Venue | Position | Notes |
Representing Algeria
| 1981 | World Cup | Rome, Italy | 8th | 59.80 m^{1} |
| 1983 | World Championships | Helsinki, Finland | 26th (q) | 65.54 m |
| 1983 | Mediterranean Games | Casablanca, Morocco | 5th | 66.64 m |
| 1984 | African Championships | Rabat, Morocco | 1st | 68.64 m |
| 1984 | Olympic Games | Los Angeles, United States | 17th (q) | 67.68 m |
| 1985 | African Championships | Cairo, Egypt | 1st | 70.56 m |
| 1985 | World Cup | Canberra, Australia | 5th | 69.84 m^{1} |
| 1986 | Goodwill Games | Moscow, Soviet Union | 13th | 67.00 m |
| 1987 | All-Africa Games | Nairobi, Kenya | 1st | 70.10 m |
| 1987 | Mediterranean Games | Latakia, Syria | 4th | 68.64 m |
| 1988 | African Championships | Annaba, Algeria | 1st | 69.06 m |
| 1988 | Olympic Games | Seoul, South Korea | 26th (q) | 65.78 m |
| 1989 | African Championships | Lagos, Nigeria | 1st | 69.98 m |
| 1989 | Universiade | Duisburg, West Germany | 10th | 66.94 m |
| 1989 | World Cup | Barcelona, Spain | 8th | 67.62 m^{1} |
| 1990 | African Championships | Cairo, Egypt | 3rd | 66.34 m |
| 1991 | All-Africa Games | Cairo, Egypt | 2nd | 63.12 m |
| 1992 | African Championships | Mauritius | 1st | 69.80 m |
| 1992 | World Cup | Havana, Cuba | 7th | 68.14 m^{1} |
| 1993 | African Championships | Durban, South Africa | 1st | 69.82 m |
| 1994 | World Cup | London, United Kingdom | 7th | 69.38 m^{1} |
| 1995 | World Championships | Gothenburg, Sweden | 31st (q) | 68.38 m |
| 1995 | All-Africa Games | Harare, Zimbabwe | 1st | 67.12 m |
| 1996 | African Championships | Yaoundé, Cameroon | 1st | 69.32 m |
| 1997 | Mediterranean Games | Bari, Italy | 8th | 69.14 m |
| 1997 | World Championships | Athens, Greece | 36th (q) | 68.32 m |
| 1998 | African Championships | Dakar, Senegal | 2nd | 69.36 m |
| 1999 | All-Africa Games | Johannesburg, South Africa | 4th | 64.11 m |

^{1}Representing Africa
