= Mamadou Diallo (athlete) =

Senegalese triple jumper

Medal record

Men's athletics

Representing Senegal

African Championships
Gold medal – first place	1982 Cairo	Triple jump
Bronze medal – third place	1984 Rabat	Triple jump
Bronze medal – third place	1985 Cairo	Triple jump

Mamadou Diallo (born November 16, 1954) is a retired triple jumper from Senegal. He competed at the 1984 Summer Olympics in Los Angeles, California, finishing in 12th place in the final rankings with a jump of 15.99 meters.

== Achievements ==
Year	Competition	Venue	Position	Event	Notes
Representing Senegal
1982	African Championships	Cairo, Egypt	1st	Triple jump	16.23 m
1984	African Championships	Rabat, Morocco	3rd	Triple jump	16.68 m
1984	Olympic Games	Los Angeles, United States	12th	Triple jump	15.99 m
