= Alfred Nyambane =

Kenyan sprinter

Personal information
- Nationality: Kenyan
- Born: 15 June 1956 (age 70)

Sport
- Sport: Sprinting
- Event: 200 metres
Medal record
Men's athletics
Representing Kenya
African Championships
| Gold medal – first place | 1985 Cairo | 4×400 m |
| Silver medal – second place | 1985 Cairo | 4×100 m |
| Bronze medal – third place | 1982 Cairo | 4×100 m |
| Bronze medal – third place | 1985 Cairo | 200 m |

Alfred Nyambane (born 15 June 1956) is a Kenyan former sprinter. He competed in the men's 200 metres at the 1984 Summer Olympics.
