= Justina Chepchirchir =

Kenyan middle-distance runner

Personal information
- Nationality: Kenyan
- Born: 20 October 1968 (age 57)
- Height: 1.50 m (4 ft 11 in)
- Weight: 42 kg (93 lb)

Sport
- Sport: Athletics
- Events: 800 m, 1500 m, 3000 m

Achievements and titles
- Personal best: 1500 m: 4:15.4
Medal record
Women's athletics
Representing Kenya
African Championships
Gold medal – first place	1982 Cairo	1500 m
Gold medal – first place	1982 Cairo	3000 m
Gold medal – first place	1984 Rabat	800 m
Gold medal – first place	1984 Rabat	1500 m
Gold medal – first place	1984 Rabat	4×400 m

Justina Chepchirchir (born 20 October 1968) is a former Kenyan middle-distance runner who specialised in the 800 meters, 1500 metres, and 3000 meters events. She won gold medals in the 1982 African Championships in Athletics in 1500 m and 3000 m. In the 1984 edition she retained her title in 1500 metres and won another gold in 800 meters. She also competed for Kenya in the 1984 Summer Olympics in 1500 metres, but did not progress to the finals.

== Achievements ==
Year	Competition	Venue	Position	Event	Notes
1982	African Championships	Cairo, Egypt	1st	1500 m	4:22.03
1982	African Championships	Cairo, Egypt	1st	3000 m	9:20.30
1984	Summer Olympics	Los Angeles, United States	17th	1500 m	4:21.97
1984	African Championships	Rabat, Morocco	1st	800 m	2:04.52
1984	African Championships	Rabat, Morocco	1st	1500 m	4:18.45
