= Fatima Aouam =

Moroccan middle-distance runner

Personal information
- Born: December 16, 1959 Casablanca, Morocco
- Died: December 27, 2014 (aged 55) Casablanca, Morocco

Sport
- Sport: Track and field
Medal record
Representing Morocco
African Championships
Gold medal – first place	1988 Annaba	3000 m
Silver medal – second place	1984 Rabat	1500 m
Silver medal – second place	1985 Cairo	1500 m
Silver medal – second place	1988 Annaba	1500 m
Bronze medal – third place	1982 Cairo	4×400 m
Bronze medal – third place	1984 Rabat	4×400 m
Bronze medal – third place	1985 Cairo	800 m
Bronze medal – third place	1988 Annaba	4×400 m
Mediterranean Games
Gold medal – first place	1987 Latakia	1500m
Gold medal – first place	1987 Latakia	3000m

Fatima Aouam (December 16, 1959 – December 27, 2014) was a Moroccan middle-distance runner from Settat Guisser. She is best known for winning two gold medals at the 1987 Mediterranean Games in Latakia, Syria. Aouam set her personal best (4:05.49) in the 1,500 m in 1986. She died at the age of 55 in 2014.

== Achievements ==
Year	Competition	Venue	Position	Event	Notes
Representing Morocco
1984	African Championships	Rabat, Morocco	1st	1,500 m	
1985	African Championships	Cairo, Egypt	1st	800 m	
1985	African Championships	Cairo, Egypt	1st	1,500 m	
1987	Mediterranean Games	Latakia, Syria	1st	1,500 m	
1987	Mediterranean Games	Latakia, Syria	1st	3,000 m	
1987	World Championships	Rome, Italy	17th (h)	1,500 metres	
1988	African Championships	Annaba, Algeria	1st	1,500 m	
1988	African Championships	Annaba, Algeria	1st	3,000 metres	
1988	Olympic Games	Seoul, South Korea	10th	1500 m	4:08.00
1988	Olympic Games	Seoul, South Korea	heats	3000 m	DNF
