= Zoubida Laayouni =

Moroccan discus thrower (born 1956)

Medal record

Women's athletics

Representing Morocco

African Championships
Gold medal – first place	1979 Dakar	Discus throw
Gold medal – first place	1982 Cairo	Discus throw
Gold medal – first place	1984 Rabat	Discus throw
Gold medal – first place	1985 Cairo	Discus throw
Gold medal – first place	1989 Lagos	Discus throw
Gold medal – first place	1990 Cairo	Discus throw
Bronze medal – third place	1988 Annaba	Discus throw
Bronze medal – third place	1992 Belle Vue Harel	Discus throw

Zoubida Laayouni (born 5 February 1956) is a Moroccan discus thrower. She won eight medals at the African Championships in Athletics, including a record-setting six gold medals.

Her personal best in the event is 56.94 metres set in Meknès in 1994. This is the still standing national record.

== Competition record ==
Year	Competition	Venue	Position	Event	Notes
Representing Morocco
1979	African Championships	Dakar, Senegal	1st	Discus throw	46.18 m
1979	World Cup	Montreal, Canada	8th	Discus throw	46.08 m^{1}
1979	Mediterranean Games	Split, Yugoslavia	4th	Discus throw	45.88 m
1981	Arab Championships	Tunis, Tunisia	1st	Discus throw	49.88 m
1981	World Cup	Rome, Italy	9th	Discus throw	45.24 m^{1}
1982	African Championships	Cairo, Egypt	1st	Discus throw	51.50 m
1983	Maghreb Championships	Casablanca, Morocco	1st	Discus throw	50.92 m
1983	Arab Championships	Amman, Jordan	1st	Discus throw	47.84 m
1983	Mediterranean Games	Casablanca, Morocco	4th	Discus throw	51.48 m
1984	African Championships	Rabat, Morocco	1st	Discus throw	52.70 m
1985	African Championships	Cairo, Egypt	1st	Discus throw	51.80 m
1985	World Cup	Canberra, Australia	8th	Discus throw	49.68 m^{1}
1987	Arab Championships	Algiers, Algeria	2nd	Discus throw	49.79 m
1987	Mediterranean Games	Latakia, Syria	5th	Discus throw	51.34 m
1988	African Championships	Annaba, Algeria	3rd	Discus throw	47.50 m
1989	African Championships	Lagos, Nigeria	1st	Discus throw	51.14 m
1989	Jeux de la Francophonie	Casablanca, Morocco	5th	Discus throw	48.66 m
1989	World Cup	Barcelona, Spain	9th	Discus throw	48.34 m^{1}
1989	Arab Championships	Cairo, Egypt	2nd	Discus throw	52.12 m
1990	African Championships	Cairo, Egypt	1st	Discus throw	53.10 m
1990	Maghreb Championships	Algiers, Algeria	1st	Discus throw	54.00 m
1991	Mediterranean Games	Athens, Greece	6th	Discus throw	53.22 m
1992	African Championships	Belle Vue Maurel, Mauritius	3rd	Discus throw	52.74 m
1993	Mediterranean Games	Narbonne, France	5th	Discus throw	52.92 m
1994	Jeux de la Francophonie	Bondoufle, France	6th	Discus throw	53.12 m
1995	Arab Championships	Cairo, Egypt	3rd	Discus throw	

^{1}Representing Africa
