= Omer Khalifa =

Sudanese retired middle distance runner (born 1956)

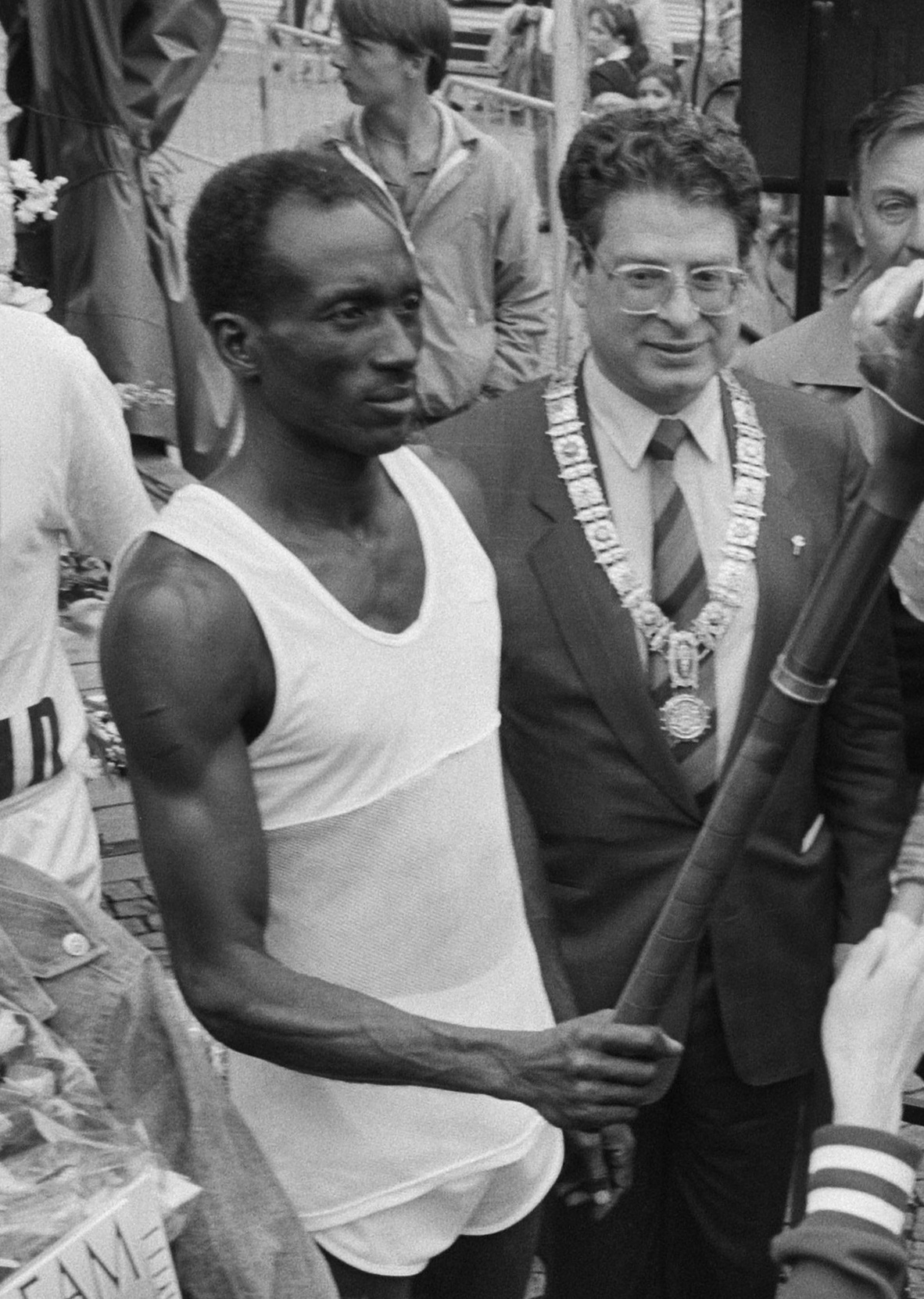
- Khalifa in 1986

Personal information
- Nationality: Sudanese
- Born: 18 December 1956 (age 69)
- Height: 1.74 m (5 ft 9 in)
- Weight: 64 kg (141 lb)

Sport
- Sport: Track
- Events: 800 meters, 1500 meters, Mile

Achievements and titles
- Personal bests: 800 metres: 1:44.75; 1500 metres: 3:33.28; Mile: 3:53.28
Medal record
Men's athletics
Representing Sudan
African Championships
| Gold medal – first place | 1985 Cairo | 1500 m |
| Silver medal – second place | 1979 Dakar | 800 m |
| Silver medal – second place | 1984 Rabat | 1500 m |
| Bronze medal – third place | 1984 Rabat | 800 m |

Omer Khalifa (born 18 December 1956) is a Sudanese retired middle distance runner who set a national record of 3:33.28 minutes over 1500 meters in Grosseto of 1986. Prior to this, he won silver medals in the 800 m and 1500 m races at the Olympic Boycott Games in 1980. Khalifa won the 1500 m race at the World Cup 1985 in Canberra. He finished fifth in the 1500 m final at the 1987 World Championships in Athletics in Rome and eighth in the 1984 Summer Olympics in the same event. He also competed at the 1988 Summer Olympics, finishing 12th.

== Running career ==
Khalifa ran at the 1983 World Championships in Helsinki, both in the 800 meters and over 1500 meters, but different from each in the flow. In 1984 he reached at the Olympic Games in Los Angeles the finals over 1500 meters and finished second in 3:37.11 minutes eighth place, about 800 meters he missed his fifth semifinal in 1:44.87 minutes only just the final. In 1985 Khalifa won the 1500 meter race at the World Cup in Canberra. His best finish at a world championship took place at the 1987 World Championships in Rome, when he was in fifth over 1500 meters in a track separation. At the 1988 Summer Olympics Khalifa reached the 1500 meters in the finals again. In the course of the race he led for a long time in the top, but fell in the final sprint to twelfth and last place.

Khalifa studied at Loughborough University during the same time when Sebastian Coe and David Moorcroft studied. During his career in competitive running he was 1.77 meters tall and weighed 64 kilograms.

He won the British AAA Championships title in the 800 metres event at the 1980 AAA Championships.

== In popular culture ==
Khalifa is the protagonist of the 1988 video game The Race Against Time.

== See also ==
- Sudan at the 1988 Summer Olympics
