= Iziaq Adeyanju =

Nigerian sprinter

Personal information
- Born: 21 October 1959 (age 66)

Sport
- Sport: Track and field
Medal record
Representing Nigeria
Commonwealth Games
Gold medal – first place	1982 Brisbane	4x100m relay
African Championships
Gold medal – first place	1984 Rabat	4×100 m
Gold medal – first place	1985 Cairo	4×100 m
Gold medal – first place	1988 Annaba	4×100 m
Bronze medal – third place	1988 Annaba	100 m

Iziaq Adeyanju (sometimes written Iziak Adeyanju; born 21 October 1959) is a Nigerian former sprinter who competed in the 1984 Summer Olympics and in the 1988 Summer Olympics.

In the 4 x 100 metres relay he won a gold medal at the 1982 Commonwealth Games and the 1985 African Championships, and also finished seventh with the African team at the 1985 World Cup.

He won a 100/200 m double at the Nigerian Athletics Championships in 1988.
