= Innocent Egbunike =

Nigerian sprinter (born 1961)

Personal information
- Born: 30 November 1961 (age 64)
Medal record
Men's athletics
Representing Nigeria
Olympic Games
| Bronze medal – third place | 1984 Los Angeles | 4x400 m relay |
World Championships
| Silver medal – second place | 1987 Rome | 400 m |
All-Africa Games
| Gold medal – first place | 1987 Nairobi | 400 m |
African Championships
| Gold medal – first place | 1984 Rabat | 200 m |
| Gold medal – first place | 1985 Cairo | 400 m |
| Gold medal – first place | 1988 Annaba | 400 m |
| Silver medal – second place | 1985 Cairo | 200 m |
| Silver medal – second place | 1985 Cairo | 4×400 m |
Summer Universiade
| Gold medal – first place | 1983 Edmonton | 200 m |

Innocent Ejima Egbunike (born 30 November 1961) is a former sprinter from Nigeria.

He studied at Azusa Pacific University, where he still holds the school record in the 400 metres and the automatically timed NAIA meet record in the 200 metres.

== Medals ==
At the 1983 Summer Universiade he won the 200 metres. At the regional level he won the 1987 All-Africa Games as well as three gold medals at the African Championships.

He won an Olympic bronze medal in 4 x 400 metres relay in Los Angeles 1984. He finished sixth in the final of the individual 400 metres contest. Four years later in Seoul he placed fifth. In addition he won a silver medal in the 400 metres at the 1987 World Championships.

He also won the gold medal in the 200 metres at the 1983 Summer Universiade with a personal best of 20.42 seconds; he followed this by finishing 6th in a world class field in the 200 metre final at the 1983 World Championships in Athletics in Helsinki.

He also won the Soviet 100 metres in 1983.

== Post athletics ==
After retiring from competition he became a coach. He was coach of the Nigerian track and field team at the 1996 and 2000 Summer Olympics, and head coach at the 2008 Summer Olympics. He was coach of Angelo Taylor, the gold medalist in the 400m hurdles at the 2008 Summer Olympics, coach of Chris Brown, the fourth-place finisher in the 400m at the 2008 Summer Olympic Games. Egbunike is currently the head coach of Pasadena City College's track and field team.

== Achievements ==
| Year | Competition | Venue | Position | Event | Notes |
Representing Nigeria
| 1984 | African Championships | Rabat, Morocco | 1st | 200 m | 20.66 |
| 1987 | All-Africa Games | Nairobi, Kenya | 1st | 400 m | 44.23 |

== Personal bests ==
- 100 metres - 10.15 s (1984)
- 200 metres - 20.42 s (1983)
- 400 metres - 44.17 s (1987) - Commonwealth Record until the 2012 Olympic final
- 800 metres - 1.51.1 min (1986)

== Personal life ==
Egbunike is good friends with former Kansas City Chiefs' running back Christian Okoye and met him when they were both training for Nigeria's national track and field team. While at Azusa Pacific, he told coaches about Okoye's ability in the discus and they decided to offer Okoye a scholarship for track and field.
