= Chidi Imoh =

Nigerian sprinter (born 1965)

Personal information
- Full name: Chukwudi Imoh
- Born: 27 August 1965 (age 60)
Medal record
Men's athletics
Representing Nigeria
Olympic Games
Silver medal – second place	1992 Barcelona	4x100 m relay
Goodwill Games
Silver medal – second place	1986 Moscow	100 m
World Indoor Championships
Bronze medal – third place	1991 Seville	60 m
African Championships
Gold medal – first place	1984 Rabat	100 m
Gold medal – first place	1984 Rabat	4×100 m
Gold medal – first place	1985 Cairo	100 m
Gold medal – first place	1985 Cairo	4×100 m
Gold medal – first place	1988 Annaba	4×100 m
All-Africa Games
Gold medal – first place	1987 Nairobi	100 m
Summer Universiade
Gold medal – first place	1983 Edmonton	100 m
Gold medal – first place	1985 Kobe	100 m

Chukwudi "Chidi" Imoh (born 27 August 1965) is a Nigerian former sprinter who won a silver medal in the 4 x 100 metres relay at the 1992 Summer Olympics. He also won a silver medal in the 100 metres at the 1986 Goodwill Games, finishing behind Ben Johnson and ahead of Carl Lewis. He won a 60 metres bronze medal at the 1991 World Indoor Championships, and he became African champion in 1984 and 1985.

In 1986 he posted the world leading time for that year in the 100 metres.

He won the 100 metres race in the 1987 All-Africa Games.

Imoh also competed for the University of Missouri in Columbia, where he holds the school records in the 200 metres outdoor with a time of 19.9 seconds, the 100 metres outdoor with a time of 10.00 seconds, and the 55 metres indoor with a time of 6.10 seconds.

== Personal bests ==
- 100 metres - 10.00 (1986)
- 200 metres - 21.04 (1985)
