= Lucienne N'Da =

Ivorian high jumper (born 1965)

Personal information
- Born: 6 July 1965 (age 61)
- Height: 1.74 m (5 ft 9 in)
- Weight: 60 kg (132 lb)

Sport
- Country: Ivory Coast
- Sport: Track and field
- Event: High jump

Achievements and titles
- Personal best: High jump: 1.95 m (1992)
Medal record
Women's athletics
Representing Ivory Coast
African Championships
Gold medal – first place	1988 Annaba	High jump
Gold medal – first place	1989 Lagos	High jump
Gold medal – first place	1990 Cairo	High jump
Gold medal – first place	1992 Belle-Vue	High jump
Silver medal – second place	1984 Rabat	High jump
Silver medal – second place	1993 Durban	High jump
Bronze medal – third place	1982 Cairo	High jump
Bronze medal – third place	1985 Cairo	High jump
All-Africa Games
Gold medal – first place	1991 Cairo	High jump
Representing Africa
World Cup
Bronze medal – third place	1992 Havana	High jump

Lucienne N'Da (born 6 July 1965) is an Ivorian retired high jumper and four-time African champion. Her personal best jump of 1.95 metres, achieved at the 1992 African Championships in Belle Vue Maurel, is the current national record. She also competed at two Olympic Games, in Seoul 1988 and Barcelona 1992.

== International competitions ==
Year	Competition	Venue	Position	Event	Notes
Representing Ivory Coast
1982	African Championships	Cairo, Egypt	3rd	High jump	1.64 m
1983	Universiade	Edmonton, Canada	14th (q)	High jump	1.75 m
1984	African Championships	Rabat, Morocco	2nd	High jump	1.73 m
1985	African Championships	Cairo, Egypt	3rd	High jump	1.70 m
1988	African Championships	Annaba, Algeria	1st	High jump	1.80 m
1988	Olympic Games	Seoul, South Korea	24th (q)	High jump	1.75 m
1989	African Championships	Lagos, Nigeria	1st	High jump	1.81 m
1989	World Cup	Barcelona, Spain	7th	High jump	1.80 m
1990	African Championships	Cairo, Egypt	1st	High jump	1.80 m
1991	All-Africa Games	Cairo, Egypt	1st	High jump	1.83 m
1992	African Championships	Belle Vue Maurel, Mauritius	1st	High jump	1.95 m NR
1992	Olympic Games	Barcelona, Spain	37th (q)	High jump	1.79 m
1992	World Cup	Havana, Cuba	3rd	High jump	1.88 m
1993	African Championships	Durban, South Africa	2nd	High jump	1.86 m
1994	Jeux de la Francophonie	Évry, France	3rd	High jump	1.87 m
