= Paul Emordi =

Nigerian athlete (born 1965)

Personal information
- Born: 25 December 1965 (age 60)

Sport
- Sport: Track and field
Medal record
Representing Nigeria
World Indoor Championships
Silver medal – second place	1987 Indianapolis	Long jump
African Championships
Gold medal – first place	1984 Rabat	Long jump
Gold medal – first place	1985 Cairo	Long jump
Gold medal – first place	1985 Cairo	Triple jump
Summer Universiade
Silver medal – second place	1987 Zagreb	Long jump

Paul Azuka Emordi (born 25 December 1965) is a retired Nigerian athlete who competed in the long jump and triple jump.

His personal best in long jump was 8.25 metres, achieved in June 1987 in Baton Rouge. This ranks him third among Nigerian long jumpers, only behind Yusuf Alli (8.27 m) and Charlton Ehizuelen (8.26 indoor).

In 1987, Emordi won an NCAA title in the long jump representing the Texas Southern Tigers track and field team.

== Achievements ==
Year	Competition	Venue	Position	Event	Notes
Representing Nigeria
1984	African Championships	Rabat, Morocco	1st	Long jump	7.90 m
1984	Olympic Games	Los Angeles, United States	21st	Triple jump	15.88 m
1985	African Championships	Cairo, Egypt	1st	Long jump	7.90 m
1985	African Championships	Cairo, Egypt	1st	Triple jump	16.56 m
1987	World Indoor Championships	Indianapolis, United States	2nd	Long jump	8.01 m
1987	Universiade	Zagreb, Yugoslavia	2nd	Long jump	8.11 m
1987	All-Africa Games	Nairobi, Kenya	1st	Long jump	8.23 m
1987	World Championships	Rome, Italy	16th	Long jump	7.80 m

== See also ==
- List of champions of Africa of athletics
