= Veronica Bawuah =

Ghanaian sprinter (born 1967)

Personal information
- Nationality: Ghanaian
- Born: 5 December 1967 (age 58)

Sport
- Sport: Sprinting
- Event: 4 × 100 metres relay
Medal record
Women's athletics
Representing Ghana
African Championships
Gold medal – first place	1988 Annaba	4×100 m
Gold medal – first place	2000 Algiers	4×100 m
Bronze medal – third place	1985 Cairo	4×400 m
Bronze medal – third place	1988 Annaba	200 m
Bronze medal – third place	1998 Dakar	4×100 m

Veronica Bawuah (born 5 December 1967) is a Ghanaian sprinter. She competed in the 4 × 100 metres relay at the 1988 Summer Olympics and the 2000 Summer Olympics.
