= Mercy Addy =

Ghanaian sprinter

Personal information
- Nationality: Ghanaian
- Born: Mercy Addy; 7 May 1964 (age 62) Ghana
- Occupation(s): Sports, Sprinter
- Years active: 1989
Medal record
Women's athletics
Representing Ghana
African Championships
Gold medal – first place	1988 Annaba	4×100 m
Silver medal – second place	1984 Rabat	200 m
Silver medal – second place	1984 Rabat	4×100 m
Silver medal – second place	1984 Rabat	4×400 m
Bronze medal – third place	1984 Rabat	400 m
Bronze medal – third place	1988 Annaba	400 m

Mercy Addy (born 7 May 1964) is a Ghanaian sprinter who specialized in the 400 metres.

Her personal best time is 51.0 seconds (hand-timed), which she achieved in October 1989 in Accra. This time currently stands as the Ghanaian record. She also recorded a time of 52.08 seconds with electronic timing.

== Achievements ==
Year	Competition	Venue	Position	Event	Notes
Representing Ghana
1984	African Championships	Rabat, Morocco	2nd	200 m	
1984	African Championships	Rabat, Morocco	3rd	400 m	
1987	All-Africa Games	Nairobi, Kenya	3rd	400 m	
1988	African Championships	Annaba, Algeria	3rd	400 m	
