= Cynthia Quartey =

Ghanaian sprinter

Medal record

Women's athletics

Representing Ghana

African Championships
Gold medal – first place	1985 Cairo	4×100 m
Silver medal – second place	1984 Rabat	4×100 m
Silver medal – second place	1990 Cairo	4×100 m

Cynthia Quartey (born 3 November 1965) is a Ghanaian former athlete who specialized in sprinting.

She represented her country at the 1984 Summer Olympics in Los Angeles, where she participated in the 4 x 100 meter relay winning a medal.
