= 1985 African Championships in Athletics =

- Dates: 15–18 August
- Host city: Cairo, Egypt

The 1985 African Championships in Athletics were held in Cairo, Egypt between 15 and 18 August.

== Medal summary ==
=== Men's events ===
Event	Gold		Silver		Bronze	
100 metres (wind: +1.8 m/s)	Chidi Imo; Nigeria	10.22	Charles-Louis Seck; Senegal	10.37	Victor Edet; Nigeria	10.44
200 metres (wind: +1.9 m/s)	Simeon Kipkemboi; Kenya	20.82	Innocent Egbunike; Nigeria	20.85	Alfred Nyambane; Kenya	20.92
400 metres	Innocent Egbunike; Nigeria	45.22 CR	Gabriel Tiacoh; Ivory Coast	45.44	David Kitur; Kenya	46.01
800 metres	Sammy Koskei; Kenya	1:45.30	Moussa Fall; Senegal	1:45.95	Juma Ndiwa; Kenya	1:46.67
1500 metres	Omer Khalifa; Sudan	3:37.74 CR	Abdi Bile; Somalia	3:38.19	Joseph Chesire; Kenya	3:38.72
5000 metres (Note: The athletes ran an extra lap, making the distance 5400 metres in total.)	Wodajo Bulti; Ethiopia	14:40.12	Paul Kipkoech; Kenya	14:43.05	John Ngugi; Kenya	14:44.33
10,000 metres	Wodajo Bulti; Ethiopia	28:22.43	Kipsubai Koskei; Kenya	28:26.63	Paul Kipkoech; Kenya	28:29.64
Marathon	Ahmed Salah; Djibouti	2:23:01	Kebede Balcha; Ethiopia	2:24:31	Dereje Nedi; Ethiopia	2:25:41
3000 metre steeplechase	Julius Kariuki; Kenya	8:20.74 CR	Joshua Kipkemboi; Kenya	8:21.70	Féthi Baccouche; Tunisia	8:38.94
110 metres hurdles (wind: +0.7 m/s)	René Djédjémel Mélédjé; Ivory Coast	14.14	Ikechukwu Mbadugha; Nigeria	14.47	Hisham Mohamed Makin; Egypt	14.52
400 metres hurdles	Amadou Dia Bâ; Senegal	48.29 CR	Henry Amike; Nigeria	49.16	René Djédjémel Mélédjé; Ivory Coast	49.59
4 × 100 metres relay	Nigeria; Iziaq Adeyanju; Ikpoto Eseme; Victor Edet; Chidi Imo	39.28 CR	Kenya; Alfred Nyambane; Simeon Kipkemboi; Joseph Sainah; Peter Wekesa	39.91	Algeria; Abdesslam Kadouri; Abdelkader Kaci; Djamel Boudebibah; Mustapha Kamel Selmi	40.14
4 × 400 metres relay	Kenya; Julius Sang; Tito Sawe; Alfred Nyambane; David Kitur	3:01.86 CR	Nigeria; Henry Amike; Innocent Egbunike; Moses Ugbisien; Sunday Uti	3:05.51	Senegal; Amadou Dia Ba; Ousmane Diarra; Moussa Fall; Babacar Niang	3:07.94
20 kilometre road walk	Abdelwahab Ferguène; Algeria	1:33:28	Shemsu Hassan; Ethiopia	1:42:26	Abderrahmane Djebbar; Algeria	1:49:26
High jump	Moussa Sagna Fall; Senegal	2.17	Ogmore Okoro; Nigeria	2.17	Khalid Koughbar; Morocco	2.11
Pole vault	Choukri Abahnini; Tunisia	4.60	Mourad Mahour Bacha; Algeria	4.50	Youssef Qortobi; Morocco	4.50
Long jump	Paul Emordi; Nigeria	7.90	Joseph Kio; Nigeria	7.81	Mustapha Benmrah; Morocco	7.56
Triple jump	Paul Emordi; Nigeria	16.56	Joseph Kio; Nigeria	16.26	Mamadou Diallo; Senegal	16.17
Shot put	Ahmed Mohamed Ashoush; Egypt	19.34	Ahmed Kamel Shata; Egypt	19.23	Mohamed Fatihi; Morocco	17.40
Discus throw	Christian Okoye; Nigeria	63.56 CR	Mohamed Naguib Hamed; Egypt	62.24	Hassan Ahmed Hamad; Egypt	55.38
Hammer throw	Hakim Toumi; Algeria	70.56 CR	Yacine Louail; Algeria	61.30	Ahmed Ibrahim Taha; Egypt	61.54
Javelin throw	Ahmed Mahour Bacha; Algeria	80.04 CR	Mongi Alimi; Tunisia	75.30	Justin Arop; Uganda	74.60
Decathlon	Mourad Mahour Bacha; Algeria	6712	Abu El Makarem El Hamd; Egypt	5642	Landry Nzambé-Busugu; Gabon	5259

=== Women's events ===
Event	Gold		Silver		Bronze	
100 metres (wind: +0.9 m/s)	Rufina Uba; Nigeria	11.61	Doris Wiredu; Ghana	11.82	Lynda Eseimokumo; Nigeria	11.86
200 metres	Rufina Uba; Nigeria	23.79	Mary Onyali; Nigeria	23.98	Martha Appiah; Ghana	24.10
400 metres	Kehinde Vaughan; Nigeria	53.33	Doris Wiredu; Ghana	53.62	Grace Bakari; Ghana	53.72
800 metres	Selina Chirchir; Kenya	2:03.70	Mary Chemweno; Kenya	2:04.58	Fatima Aouam; Morocco	2:04.91
1500 metres	Mary Chemweno; Kenya	4:17.90	Fatima Aouam; Morocco	4:19.11	Hellen Kimaiyo; Kenya	4:22.85
3000 metres	Hellen Kimaiyo; Kenya	9:18.53	Hassania Darami; Morocco	9:19.82	Regina Chemeli; Kenya	9:20.62
10,000 metres	Hassania Darami; Morocco	35:09.68	Karima Farag Mohamed; Ethiopia	44:01.32		
100 metres hurdles (wind: +1.3 m/s)	Maria Usifo; Nigeria	13.52	Cécile Ngambi; Cameroon	13.81	Albertine Koutouan; Ivory Coast	14.27
400 metres hurdles	Nawal El Moutawakil; Morocco	56.00	Maria Usifo; Nigeria	57.02	Marie Womplou; Ivory Coast	59.85
4 × 100 metres relay	Ghana; Martha Appiah; Grace Armah; Cynthia Quartey; Doris Wiredu	45.08	Nigeria; Beatrice Utondu; Mary Onyali; Lynda Eseimokumo; Rufina Ubah	45.45	Ivory Coast; Patricia Foufoué Ziga; Célestine N'Drin; Louise Koré; Seraphine Murekatete	46.98
4 × 400 metres relay	Nigeria; Airat Bakare; Maria Usifo; Kehinde Vaughan; Sadia Showunmi	3:36.13	Kenya; Selina Jeruto; Mary Chemweno; Selina Chirchir; Esther Kawaya	3:39.66	Ghana; Mary Mensah; Veronica Bawuah; Doris Wiredu; Ayishetu Adam	3:42.32
High jump	Awa Dioum-Ndiaye; Senegal	1.76	Kawther Akrémi; Tunisia	1.76	Lucienne N'Da; Ivory Coast	1.70
Long jump	Marianne Mendoza; Senegal	6.15	Grace Armah; Ghana	6.01	Caroline Nwajei; Nigeria	6.00
Shot put	Souad Malloussi; Morocco	15.20	Agnès Tchuinté; Cameroon	14.74	Odette Mistoul; Gabon	14.54
Discus throw	Zoubida Laayouni; Morocco	51.80	Mariette Van Heerden; Zimbabwe	50.14	Aïcha Dahmous; Algeria	48.84
Javelin throw	Agnès Tchuinté; Cameroon	54.00	Samia Djémaa; Algeria	50.50	Samira Benhamza; Morocco	49.32
Heptathlon	Chérifa Meskaoui; Morocco	5294	Nacèra Achir; Algeria	5286	Yasmina Azzizi; Algeria	4909

== Medal table ==
Rank	Nation	Gold	Silver	Bronze	Total
1	Nigeria (NGR)	11	10	3	24
2	Kenya (KEN)	7	6	8	21
3	Morocco (MAR)	5	2	6	13
4	Algeria (ALG)	4	4	4	12
5	Senegal (SEN)	4	2	2	8
6	Ethiopia (ETH)	2	3	1	6
7	Egypt (EGY)	1	3	3	7
7	Ghana (GHA)	1	3	3	7
9	Tunisia (TUN)	1	2	1	4
10	Cameroon (CMR)	1	2	0	3
11	Ivory Coast (CIV)	1	1	5	7
12	Djibouti (DJI)	1	0	0	1
12	Sudan (SUD)	1	0	0	1
14	Somalia (SOM)	0	1	0	1
14	Zimbabwe (ZIM)	0	1	0	1
16	Gabon (GAB)	0	0	2	2
17	Uganda (UGA)	0	0	1	1
Totals (17 entries)		40	40	39	119

== See also ==
- 1985 in athletics (track and field)
