= Joyce Odhiambo =

Kenyan sprinter

Personal information
- Nationality: Kenyan
- Born: 29 June 1963 (age 63)

Sport
- Sport: Sprinting
- Event: 100 metres
Medal record
Women's athletics
Representing Kenya
African Championships
Gold medal – first place	1982 Cairo	4×100 m
Gold medal – first place	1984 Rabat	4×100 m
Silver medal – second place	1984 Rabat	100 m
Bronze medal – third place	1984 Rabat	200 m

Joyce Odhiambo (born 29 June 1963) is a Kenyan sprinter who specialised in the 100 meters. She competed in the women's 100 metres at the 1988 Summer Olympics.
