= Célestine N'Drin =

Ivorian sprinter

Personal information
- Born: 20 July 1965 (age 61)

Sport
- Sport: Track and field
Medal record
Representing Ivory Coast
African Games
Bronze medal – third place	1978 Algiers	800m
African Championships
Silver medal – second place	1982 Cairo	400 m
Silver medal – second place	1982 Cairo	800 m
Silver medal – second place	1988 Annaba	400 m
Silver medal – second place	1988 Annaba	4×400 m
Bronze medal – third place	1984 Rabat	800 m
Bronze medal – third place	1985 Cairo	4×100 m

Célestine N'Drin (born 20 July 1965) is a Côte d'Ivoire former track and field athlete who specialized in the 400 and 800 metres. She represented her country at the Summer Olympics on three occasions: 1976, 1984 and 1988. She was the first woman to represent Ivory Coast at the Olympics.

== Achievements ==
Year	Competition	Venue	Position	Event	Notes
Representing Ivory Coast
1978	All-Africa Games	Algiers, Algeria	3rd	800 m	
1980	World Championships	Sittard, Netherlands	23rd	400 m hurdles	1:04.91
1982	African Championships	Cairo, Egypt	2nd	400 m	
1982	African Championships	Cairo, Egypt	2nd	800 m	
1984	African Championships	Rabat, Morocco	3rd	800 m	
1988	African Championships	Annaba, Algeria	2nd	400 m	52.77

=== Personal bests ===
- 400 metres - 52.04 s (1988) - national record.
- 800 metres - 2:02.99 min (1990) - national record
