= Hellen Kimaiyo =

Kenyan runner

Medal record

Women's athletics

Representing Kenya

African Championships
Gold medal – first place	1985 Cairo	3000 m
Gold medal – first place	1989 Lagos	3000 m
Silver medal – second place	1989 Lagos	1500 m
Bronze medal – third place	1985 Cairo	1500 m

Hellen Kimaiyo Kipkoskei (born September 8, 1968 in Moiben) is a retired runner from Kenya.

She won many continental competitions. She competed at the 1984 Summer Olympics aged less than 16 and at the 1992 Summer Olympics. She is also a multiple Kenyan champion.

In addition, she was a successful road runner. She won the Peachtree Road Race three times a row (1996–1998) and Dam tot Damloop four times a row (1992–1995). Kimaiyo won Zevenheuvelenloop in 1995. She won in 1994.

She held the African records for 1500 and 3000 metres.

Kimaiyo went to the Singore Girls Secondary School in Iten. She is married to Charles Kipkorir, who is also a former Kenyan runner. Soon after the 1984 Olympics she became pregnant and gave birth to her first child. She had a second child following her 1990 pregnancy.

== International competitions ==
Representing Kenya
Year	Competition	Venue	Position	Event	Notes
1985	African Championships	Cairo, Egypt	1st	3000 m	
1985	African Championships	Cairo, Egypt	3rd	1500 m	
1987	All-Africa Games	Nairobi, Kenya	2nd	3000 m	
1989	African Championships	Lagos, Nigeria	1st	3000 m	
1989	African Championships	Lagos, Nigeria	2nd	1500 m	
1992	World Cross Country Championships	Boston, United States	11th	Long race	
1992	World Cross Country Championships	Boston, United States	1st	Team race	
1992	Summer Olympics	Barcelona, Spain	9th	10,000 m	
1993	World Cross Country Championships	Amorebieta, Spain	12th	Long race	
1993	World Cross Country Championships	Amorebieta, Spain	1st	Team race	
1994	World Cross Country Championships	Budapest, Hungary	12th	Long race	
1994	World Cross Country Championships	Budapest, Hungary	3rd	Team race	

== See also ==
- List of African Games medalists in athletics (women)
- List of African Championships in Athletics medalists (women)

Sporting positions
Preceded by (United Kingdom) Liz McColgan	Zevenheuvelenloop Women's Winner (15km); 1995	Succeeded by (Belgium) Marleen Renders
