= Arwos =

- Location within Kenya
- Coordinates: 0.2°N 35.2°E
- Country: Kenya
- Province: Rift Valley Province
- Elevation: 2,022 m (6,634 ft)
- Time zone: UTC+3 (EAT)
- Climate: Cfb

Arwos is a settlement in Kenya's Nandy County, in the former Rift Valley Province. It is roughly 152 miles NW of Nairobi, the capital of Kenya.

== Ethnicity ==
The people of the Rift Valley are a meshwork of different tribes; the Kalenjin and the Maasai are the two best-known. Most of Kenya's top runners come from the Kalenjin community. The Maasai people have the most recognizable cultural identity, both nationally and internationally; they serve as Kenya's international cultural symbol.
