= 1984 African Championships in Athletics =

- Dates: 12–15 August
- Host city: Rabat, Morocco

The 1984 African Championships in Athletics were held in Rabat, Morocco from August 12 to 15, 1984 in the Prince Moulay Abdellah Stadium.

== Medal summary ==
=== Men's events ===
Event	Gold		Silver		Bronze	
100 metres	Chidi Imo; Nigeria	10.40 CR	Charles-Louis Seck; Senegal	10.49	Eseme Ikpoto; Nigeria	10.58
200 metres	Innocent Egbunike; Nigeria	20.66 CR	Eseme Ikpoto; Nigeria	21.19	Ali Bakhta; Algeria	21.32
400 metres	Gabriel Tiacoh; Ivory Coast	45.52	Sunday Uti; Nigeria	46.16	El Kashief Hassan; Sudan	46.47
800 metres	Sammy Koskei; Kenya	1:45.17 CR	Moussa Fall; Senegal	1:45.56	Omer Khalifa; Sudan	1:45.78
1500 metres	Saïd Aouita; Morocco	3:38.18 CR	Omer Khalifa; Sudan	3:39.90	Mehdi Aidet; Algeria	3:40.85
5000 metres	Abderrazak Bounour; Algeria	13:41.94 CR	Samson Obwocha; Kenya	13:41.98	Kipsubai Koskei; Kenya	13:42.05
10,000 metres	Kipsubai Koskei; Kenya	28:11.70 CR	Ahmed Salah; Djibouti	28:17.40 (NR)	Mohamed Ali Chouri; Tunisia	28:49.80
3000 metre steeplechase	Joshua Kipkemboi; Kenya	8:27.88 CR	Lahcene Babaci; Algeria	8:36.60	Habib Chérif; Algeria	8:38.26
110 metres hurdles	Philip Sang; Kenya	14.15	Riad Benhaddad; Algeria	14.36	Hisham Mohamed Makin; Egypt	14.6
400 metres hurdles	Amadou Dia Bâ; Senegal	49.30 CR	Henry Amike; Nigeria	49.95	Ahmed Abdel Halim Ghanem; Egypt	50.77
4 × 100 metres relay	Nigeria; Nigeria; Iziak Adeyanju; Ikpoto Eseme; Samson Oyeledun; Chidi Imoh	39.49 CR	Côte d'Ivoire; Ivory Coast; Otokpa Kouadio; Barthelemy Koffi; Georges Kablan Degnan; Gabriel Tiacoh	39.94	Senegal; Senegal; Hamidou Diawara; Ibrahima Fall; Charles-Louis Seck; Mamadou Sène	40.86
4 × 400 metres relay	Senegal; Senegal; Boubacar Diallo; Babacar Niang; Moussa Fall; Amadou Dia Ba	3:04.76 CR	Nigeria; Nigeria; Henry Amike; Olurotimi Peters; Moses Ugbisien; Sunday Uti	3:04.85	Kenya; Kenya; Elkana Nyangau; Tito Sawe; James Maina Boi; Peter Kipchumba	3:06.73
20 kilometre road walk	Abdelwahab Ferguène; Algeria	1:30:02 CR	Benamar Kachkouche; Algeria	1:30:02	Hassan Kouchaoui; Morocco	1:32:46
High jump	Mohamed Aghlal; Morocco	2.17	Boubacar Guèye; Senegal	2.14	Azzedine Mostéfa; Algeria; Belba Ngaroudel; Chad	2.05
Pole vault	Mohamed Bouihiri; Morocco	4.60	Mongi Labidi; Tunisia	4.40	Choukri Abahnini; Tunisia	4.40
Long jump	Paul Emordi; Nigeria	7.90	Yusuf Alli; Nigeria	7.88	Joseph Kio; Nigeria	7.82
Triple jump	Joseph Taiwo; Nigeria	17.19 CR	Ajayi Agbebaku; Nigeria	16.96	Mamadou Diallo; Senegal	16.68
Shot put	Ahmed Mohamed Ashoush; Egypt	18.45	Ahmed Kamel Shata; Egypt	18.09	Mohamed Fatihi; Morocco	16.95
Discus throw	Mohamed Naguib Hamed; Egypt	58.62	Abderrazak Ben Hassine; Tunisia	54.46	Mohamed Fatihi; Morocco	48.86
Hammer throw	Hakim Toumi; Algeria	68.64 CR	Hisham Abdeslam Zaki; Egypt	61.04	Yacine Louail; Algeria	59.90
Javelin throw	Tarek Chaabani; Tunisia	77.40 CR	Mongi Alimi; Tunisia	73.88	Ahmed Mahour Bacha; Algeria	71.86
Decathlon	Mourad Mahour Bacha; Algeria	7022	Hatem Bachar; Tunisia	6890	Abdennacer Moumen; Morocco	6810

=== Women's events ===
Event	Gold		Silver		Bronze	
100 metres	Doris Wiredu; Ghana	11.88	Joyce Odhiambo; Kenya	11.93	Grace Armah; Ghana	11.98
200 metres	Nawal El Moutawakel; Morocco	23.93	Mercy Addy; Ghana	24.42	Joyce Odhiambo; Kenya	24.44
400 metres	Ruth Atuti; Kenya	54.05	Mable Esendi; Kenya	54.88	Mercy Addy; Ghana	56.36
800 metres	Justina Chepchirchir; Kenya	2:04.52	Florence Wanjiru; Kenya	2:05.96	Célestine N'Drin; Ivory Coast	2:07.72
1500 metres	Justina Chepchirchir; Kenya	4:18.45	Fatima Aouam; Morocco	4:22.75	Leïla Bendahmane; Algeria	4:23.15
3000 metres	Mary Chepkemboi; Kenya	9:19.05	Regina Chemeli; Kenya	9:22.17	Leïla Bendahmane; Algeria	9:26.28
100 metres hurdles	Maria Usifo; Nigeria	13.42	Awa Dioum-Ndiaye; Senegal	14.40	Chérifa Meskaoui; Morocco	14.55
400 metres hurdles	Nawal El Moutawakel; Morocco	56.01	Rachida Ferdjaoui; Algeria	63.17	only two finalists	
4 × 100 metres relay	Kenya; Esther Kawaya; Joyce Odhiambo; Ruth Atuti; Mable Esendi	46.18	Ghana; Mercy Addy; Grace Armah; Cynthia Quartey; Doris Wiredu	46.20	Gambia; Georgiana Freeman; Jabou Jawo; Amie N'Dow; Frances Jatta	47.20
4 × 400 metres relay	Kenya; Justina Chepchirchir; Esther Kawaya; Ruth Atuti; Mable Esendi	3:37.76	Ghana; Mercy Addy; Martha Appiah; Doris Wiredu ?	3:45.96	Morocco ? ? Fatima Aouam; Nawal El Moutawakel	3:54.41
High jump	Awa Dioum-Ndiaye; Senegal	1.76	Lucienne N'Da; Ivory Coast	1.73	Salimata Coulibaly; Ivory Coast	1.70
Long jump	Marianne Mendoza; Senegal	5.93	Basma Gharbi; Tunisia	5.77	Dalila Tayebi; Algeria	5.68
Shot put	Odette Mistoul; Gabon	15.51	Souad Malloussi; Morocco	15.31	Aïcha Dahmous; Algeria	13.44
Discus throw	Zoubida Laayouni; Morocco	52.70	Aïcha Dahmous; Algeria	50.12	Chérifa Meskaoui; Morocco	46.04
Javelin throw	Ténin Camara; Ivory Coast	45.48	Samira Benhamza; Morocco	44.90	Naïma Fouad; Morocco	44.40
Heptathlon	Chérifa Meskaoui; Morocco	5,448	Frida Kiptala; Kenya	5,292	Nacèra Achir; Algeria	5,195

== Medal table ==
Rank	Nation	Gold	Silver	Bronze	Total
1	Kenya	10	6	3	19
2	Morocco	7	3	8	18
3	Nigeria	6	6	2	14
4	Algeria	4	5	11	20
5	Senegal	4	4	2	10
6	Egypt	2	2	2	6
6	Ivory Coast	2	2	2	6
8	Tunisia	1	5	2	8
9	Ghana	1	3	2	6
10	Gabon	1	0	0	1
11	Sudan	0	1	2	3
12	Djibouti	0	1	0	1
13	Chad	0	0	1	1
13	Gambia	0	0	1	1
Totals (14 entries)		38	38	38	114

== See also ==
- 1984 in athletics (track and field)
