= Agnès Tchuinté =

Cameroonian javelin thrower (1959–1990)

Personal information
- Nationality: Cameroonian
- Born: 30 January 1959
- Died: 1990 (aged 30–31)

Sport
- Sport: Athletics
- Event: Javelin throw
Medal record
Women's athletics
Representing Cameroon
African Championships
Gold medal – first place	1979 Dakar	Javelin throw
Gold medal – first place	1982 Cairo	Javelin throw
Gold medal – first place	1985 Cairo	Javelin throw
Silver medal – second place	1985 Cairo	Shot put

Agnès Tchuinté (30 January 1959 – 1990) was a Cameroonian athlete who specialized in the javelin throw. She competed in the women's javelin throw at the 1980 Summer Olympics and the 1984 Summer Olympics.
