= Grace Armah =

Ghanaian athletics competitor

Personal information
- Born: 22 September 1958 (age 67)
- Height: 1.60 m (5 ft 3 in)
- Weight: 56 kg (123 lb)

Sport
- Country: Ghana
- Sport: Track and field
- Event(s): 100 m, long jump

Achievements and titles
- Personal best: 100 m: 11.98 (1984)
Medal record
Women's athletics
Representing Ghana
African Championships
Gold medal – first place	1985 Cairo	4×100 m
Silver medal – second place	1984 Rabat	4×100 m
Silver medal – second place	1985 Cairo	Long jump
Bronze medal – third place	1984 Rabat	100 m

Grace Armah (full name: Grace Armah Allan-Gayinah born on 22 September 1958) is a Ghanaian retired female track and field athlete who specialised in 100 metres and long jump events. She won a silver medal and a bronze medal in the 1984 and 1985 editions of the African Championships. Her personal best in 100 metres was 11.98. She also competed for Ghana in the 1984 Summer Olympics in Los Angeles as part of Ghana's 4×100 metres relay women's team, which finished 5th in its semi-final heat and failed to progress to the final round.

== International competitions ==
Year	Competition	Venue	Position	Event	Notes
Representing Ghana
1983	World Championships	Helsinki, Finland	15th (q)	4 × 100 m relay	47.51
1984	African Championships	Rabat, Morocco	3rd	100 m	11.98
1984	Summer Olympics	Los Angeles, United States	9th (q)	4 × 100 m relay	45.20
1985	African Championships	Cairo, Egypt	2nd	Long jump	6.01 m
