= Martha Appiah =

Ghanaian sprinter

Personal information
- Nationality: Ghanaian
- Born: 19 December 1965 (age 60)

Sport
- Sport: Sprinting
- Event: 4 × 100 metres relay
Medal record
Women's athletics
Representing Ghana
African Championships
Gold medal – first place	1985 Cairo	4×100 m
Gold medal – first place	1988 Annaba	4×100 m
Silver medal – second place	1984 Rabat	4×400 m
Silver medal – second place	1988 Annaba	200 m
Bronze medal – third place	1985 Cairo	200 m

Martha Appiah (born 19 December 1965) is a Ghanaian sprinter. She competed in the women's 4 × 100 metres relay at the 1987 Summer Olympics which took place in Stadio Olimpico, Rome. She took part in 4 x 400 metres relay in 1984 which took place at the Memorial Coliseum in Los Angeles.
