= El-Hassania Darami =

Moroccan long-distance runner

Personal information
- Born: 10 December 1953 (age 72)

Sport
- Country: Morocco

Achievements and titles
- Personal best: 10,000 m: 32:01.52
Medal record
Women's athletics
Representing Morocco
African Championships
| Gold medal – first place | 1985 Cairo | 10,000 m |
| Silver medal – second place | 1985 Cairo | 3000 m |
| Silver medal – second place | 1988 Annaba | 10,000 m |
| Bronze medal – third place | 1979 Dakar | 1500 m |
| Bronze medal – third place | 1979 Dakar | 3000 m |
| Bronze medal – third place | 1982 Cairo | 3000 m |
Jeux de la Francophonie
| Silver medal – second place | 1989 Rabat | 10,000 m |

El-Hassania Darami (listed in some sources as "Elhassania" or "Hassania"; born 10 December 1953) is a former Moroccan long-distance runner who specialised in 1500 metres, 3000 metres, and 10,000 metres events. She won six medals in four different African Championships from 1979 to 1988, including the gold in 10,000 metres at the 1985 African Championships in Athletics. She also competed for Morocco in the 1988 Summer Olympics in the same event, but did not progress to the finals.

== Achievements ==
| Year | Competition | Venue | Position | Event | Notes |
|---|---|---|---|---|---|
| 1979 | African Championships | Dakar, Senegal | 3rd | 1500 m | 4:26.5 |
| 1979 | African Championships | Dakar, Senegal | 3rd | 3000 m | 9:39.7 |
| 1982 | African Championships | Cairo, Egypt | 3rd | 3000 m | 9:54.90 |
| 1985 | African Championships | Cairo, Egypt | 1st | 10,000 m | 35:09.68 |
| 1985 | African Championships | Cairo, Egypt | 2nd | 3000 m | 9:18.53 |
| 1986 | World Military Cross Country Championships | Algiers, Algeria | 1st | 5 km race | |
| 1988 | African Championships | Annaba, Algeria | 2nd | 10,000 m | 33:41.75 |
| 1988 | Summer Olympics | Seoul, South Korea | 28th | 10,000 m | 33:01.52 |
