= Awa Dioum-Ndiaye =

Senegalese athlete

Personal information
- Born: 21 November 1961 (age 64)

Sport
- Country: Senegal
- Sport: Track and field
- Event(s): High jump, triple jump, hurdling
Medal record
Women's athletics
Representing Senegal
African Championships
Gold medal – first place	1984 Rabat	High jump
Gold medal – first place	1985 Cairo	High jump
Gold medal – first place	1992 Belle-Vue	Triple jump
Silver medal – second place	1984 Rabat	100 m hurdles
All-Africa Games
Gold medal – first place	1987 Nairobi	High jump

Awa Dioum-Ndiaye (also spelled N'Diaye; born 21 November 1961) is a retired track and field athlete from Senegal who competed in the hurdling, high jump and the heptathlon events during her career in the 1980s. She is best known for winning the gold medal in the women's high jump contest at the 1987 All-Africa Games. She was twice winner at the African Championships in Athletics, winning in 1984 and 1985—the first athlete to win it twice.

== International competitions ==
Year	Competition	Venue	Position	Event	Notes
Representing Senegal
1984	African Championships	Rabat, Morocco	2nd	100 m hurdles	14.40
1984	African Championships	Rabat, Morocco	1st	High jump	1.76 m
1985	African Championships	Cairo, Egypt	1st	High jump	1.76 m
1987	All-Africa Games	Nairobi, Kenya	1st	High jump	1.80 m
1992	African Championships	Belle Vue Maurel, Mauritius	1st	Triple jump	12.47 m
Representing Africa
1985	IAAF World Cup	Canberra, Australia	8th	High jump	1.70 m
