= Kehinde Vaughan =

Nigerian sprinter

Personal information
- Nationality: Nigerian
- Born: 19 December 1961 (age 64)

Sport
- Sport: Sprinting
- Event: 400 metres
Medal record
Women's athletics
Representing Nigeria
African Championships
Gold medal – first place	1985 Cairo	400 m
Gold medal – first place	1985 Cairo	4×400 m relay
Bronze medal – third place	1979 Dakar	4×400 m relay
Summer Universiade
Bronze medal – third place	1987 Zagreb	4x400 m relay

Kehinde Vaughan (born 19 December 1961) is a Nigerian sprinter. She competed in the women's 400 metres at the 1980 Summer Olympics.
