= Airat Bakare =

Nigerian sprinter

Personal information
- Born: 20 May 1967 (age 59) Lagos, Nigeria
- Height: 1.78 m (5 ft 10 in)
- Weight: 60 kg (132 lb)

Sport
- Country: Nigeria
- Sport: Athletics
- Event: 400 m

Achievements and titles
- Personal best: 400 m: 51.83
Medal record
Women's athletics
Representing Nigeria
All-Africa Games
Bronze medal – third place	1991 Cairo	400 m
African Championships
Gold medal – first place	1985 Cairo	4×400 m relay
Gold medal – first place	1988 Annaba	400 m
Gold medal – first place	1989 Lagos	4×400 m relay
Gold medal – first place	1992 Belle Vue Harel	4×400 m relay
Bronze medal – third place	1989 Lagos	400 m
Summer Universiade
Bronze medal – third place	1987 Zagreb	4x400 m relay

Airat Bakare (born 20 May 1967) is a retired Nigerian female sprinter who specialized in the 400 metres event.

Bakare finished fifth in 4 x 400 metres relay at the 1991 World Championships, together with teammates Fatima Yusuf, Mary Onyali-Omagbemi and Charity Opara.

On the individual level, Bakare won a bronze medal at the 1991 All-Africa Games, a gold medal at the 1988 African Championships and a bronze medal at the 1989 African Championships.

She now resides in New York City with her two daughters and husband.
