= Maria Usifo =

Nigerian hurdler

Personal information
- Born: 1 August 1964 (age 61)

Sport
- Sport: Track and field
Medal record
Representing Nigeria
African Championships
Gold medal – first place	1984 Rabat	100 m hurdles
Gold medal – first place	1985 Cairo	100 m hurdles
Gold medal – first place	1985 Cairo	4×400 m relay
Gold medal – first place	1988 Annaba	100 m hurdles
Gold medal – first place	1988 Annaba	400 m hurdles
Gold medal – first place	1989 Lagos	400 m hurdles
Silver medal – second place	1985 Cairo	400 m hurdles
African Games
Gold medal – first place	1987 Nairobi	100m hurdles
Gold medal – first place	1987 Nairobi	400m hurdles
Summer Universiade
Bronze medal – third place	1987 Zagreb	4x400 m relay

Maria Usifo (born 1 August 1964) is a Nigerian athlete and former Olympian who represented Nigeria at Los Angeles (1984) and Seoul (1988) Olympic Games. She specialized in the 100 and 400 metres hurdles. She is one of the female athletes in Nigerian sports history who dominated athletic events both at national and international levels.

== Career in sports ==
Usifo started her career in sports in Nigeria in the 1970s when the school sports system was functional. She was a former hurdler and quarter-miler whose athletic opened opportunities for her to choose from 10 foreign universities after her outstanding performance at the Commonwealth Games in Brisbane, Australia in 1982. She participated in the Olympic Games in Los Angeles in 1984 and Seoul in 1988. Usifo was All-Africa Games Gold medallist and African Championships Gold medallist.

In 1986, Usifo became the first Texas Southern Tigers track and field athlete to win an individual NCAA DI title, in the 400 m hurdles.

== International competitions ==
Year	Competition	Venue	Position	Event	Notes
Representing Nigeria
1987	All-Africa Games	Nairobi, Kenya	1st	100 m hurdles	13.29
1987	All-Africa Games	Nairobi, Kenya	1st	400 m hurdles	55.72

- 1989 African Championships - gold medal (400 m h)
- 1988 African Championships - gold medal (100 m h)
- 1988 African Championships - gold medal (400 m h)
- 1985 African Championships - gold medal (100 m h)
- 1985 African Championships - silver medal (400 m h)
- 1984 African Championships - gold medal (100 m h)
