= Doris Wiredu =

Ghanaian sprinter (born 1964)

Personal information
- Born: 1 February 1964 (age 62)
- Height: 1.50 m (4 ft 11 in)
- Weight: 45 kg (99 lb)

Sport
- Country: Ghana
- Sport: Track and field
- Event(s): 100 m, 400 m

Achievements and titles
- Personal best: 100 m: 11.75 (1985)
Medal record
Women's athletics
Representing Ghana
African Championships
Gold medal – first place	1984 Rabat	100 m
Gold medal – first place	1985 Cairo	4×100 m
Silver medal – second place	1984 Rabat	4×100 m
Silver medal – second place	1984 Rabat	4×400 m
Silver medal – second place	1985 Cairo	100 m
Silver medal – second place	1985 Cairo	400 m
Bronze medal – third place	1985 Cairo	4×400 m

Doris Frema Wiredu (born 1 February 1964) is a retired Ghanaian female track and field athlete who specialised in 100 metres. She won a gold medal in the 1984 African Championships in the event, and two silvers in 100 metres and 400 metres events in the 1985 edition. Her personal best in 100 metres was 11.75, set in 1985. She also competed for Ghana in the 1984 Summer Olympics in Los Angeles as part of Ghana's 4×100 metres relay women's team, which finished 5th in its semi-final heat, without progressing to the final round.

== International competitions ==
Year	Competition	Venue	Position	Event	Notes
Representing Ghana
1984	African Championships	Rabat, Morocco	1st	100 m	11.88
1984	Summer Olympics	Los Angeles, United States	25th (q)	100 m	12.00
1984	Summer Olympics	Los Angeles, United States	9th (q)	4 × 100 m relay	45.20
1985	African Championships	Cairo, Egypt	2nd	100 m	11.82
1985	African Championships	Cairo, Egypt	2nd	400 m	53.62
