= East and Central African Championships =

International athletics competition

- Sport: Athletics
- Founded: 1955
- Ceased: 1990
- Continent: East and Central Africa

The East and Central African Championships was an annual international athletics competition between nations in East and Central Africa.

The event was established as the East African Championships in 1955, building upon of international athletics matches between Kenya and Uganda (first held in 1934), which had themselves expanded to include Tanganyika in 1952. The competition remained between these countries (with Tanzania replacing Tanganyika after it merged with Zanzibar) until 1969, at which point Tanzania's southern neighbour Zambia was invited. Zambia became the first host outside the founding three nations shortly after, with the 1971 championships being held in its capital Lusaka. More countries joined in the 1970s, including Ethiopia, Somalia, and this was expanded again in the 1980s (including Djibouti, Egypt, Zimbabwe, Mozambique). Somalia hosted the 1977 edition and the Egyptian capital Cairo was the venue in 1982 and 1985.

The championships had its final edition in 1990, with the absence of founding nation Kenya indicating the lack of support for its continuation. It had lasted for 32 editions from its inception, having been missed in the years 1962, 1966, 1978 and 1980.

== Editions ==
Edition	Year	Venue	City	Country
1st	1955		Nairobi	Kenya
2nd	1956		Moshi	Tanganyika
3rd	1957		Kampala	Uganda
4th	1958		Nairobi	Kenya
5th	1959		Arusha	Tanganyika
6th	1960		Kampala	Uganda
7th	1961		Nakuru	Kenya
—	1962			
8th	1963		Kampala	Uganda
9th	1964		Kisumu	Kenya
10th	1965		Dar es Salaam	Tanzania
—	1966			
11th	1967		Kisumu	Kenya
12th	1968		Dar es Salaam	Tanzania
13th	1969		Kampala	Uganda
14th	1970		Nairobi	Kenya
15th	1971		Lusaka	Zambia
16th	1972		Dar es Salaam	Tanzania
17th	1973		Nairobi	Kenya
18th	1974		Bugembe	Uganda
19th	1975		Mombasa	Kenya
20th	1976		Zanzibar City	Tanzania
21st	1977		Mogadishu	Somalia
—	1978			
22nd	1979		Mombasa	Kenya
—	1980			
23rd	1981		Mombasa	Kenya
24th	1982		Cairo	Egypt
25th	1983		Jinja	Uganda
26th	1984		Nairobi	Kenya
27th	1985		Cairo	Egypt
28th	1986		Nairobi	Kenya
29th	1987		Nairobi	Kenya
30th	1988	Moi International Sports Centre	Nairobi	Kenya
31st	1989		Arusha	Tanzania
32nd	1990		Jinja	Uganda

== Events ==
By the latter years of the championships, a total of 35 athletics events had been regularly contested, 20 by men and 15 by women.

Track running

- 100 metres, 200 metres, 400 metres, 800 metres, 1500 metres, 3000 metres (women only), 5000 metres (men only), 10,000 metres (men only)

Obstacle events

- 100 metres hurdles (women only), 110 metres hurdles (men only), 400 metres hurdles, 3000 metres steeplechase (men only)

Jumping events

- Pole vault (men only), high jump, long jump, triple jump (men only)

Throwing events

- Shot put, discus throw, javelin throw, hammer throw (men only)

Relays

- 4 × 100 metres relay, 4 × 400 metres relay

Events were contested over imperial distances up to 1968.

A men's marathon was contested between 1968 and 1981, with the first race being held separately from the main championships. Combined events featured at the 1972 edition, with Uganda's Alex Ochen taking the honours in the men's decathlon and his compatriot Budesia Nyakecho doing so in the women's pentathlon. Men's 20 kilometres race walks were held between 1975 and 1981, with Ethiopians Hunde Ture (1975, 1979) and Shemsu Hassan (1981) winning these events.

Women were present at the championships at least as early as 1967, with eleven women's events being contested that year. In 1970, a women's 1500 m and 4 × 400 m relay was added and the 80 metres hurdles was replaced by the international standard 100 m distance. A 3000 m for women was first held in 1976 and a women's 400 m hurdles in 1979. A women's 5000 m was first held in 1986 (won by Kenya's Susan Sirma), though it is not known if this was contested in any of the other later editions.

== Men's champions ==
=== Sprints ===
Year	100 metres	200 metres	400 metres
1961	Seraphino Antao (KEN)	Seraphino Antao (KEN)	Erasmus Amukun (UGA)
1964	Seraphino Antao (KEN)	Seraphino Antao (KEN)	Amos Omolo (UGA)
1967	Julius Sang (KEN)	Julius Sang (KEN)	Daniel Rudisha (KEN)
1968	Charles Obilu (UGA)	Charles Asati (KEN)	Amos Omolo (UGA)
1969	William Dralu (UGA)	Charles Asati (KEN)	Charles Asati (KEN)
1970	Norman Chihota (TAN)	Julius Sang (KEN)	Julius Sang (KEN)
1971	Norman Chihota (TAN)	Julius Sang (KEN)	Julius Sang (KEN)
1972	John Mwebi (KEN)	John Mwebi (KEN)	Hezekiah Nyamau (KEN)
1975	John Mwebi (KEN)	John Mwebi (KEN)	Charles Asati (KEN)
1976	John Mwebi (KEN)	Charles Asati (KEN)	Stephen Chepkwony (KEN)
1977	John Mwebi (KEN)	Tochi Mochache (KEN)	Joel Ngetich (KEN)
1979	David Lukuba (TAN)	Tochi Mochache (KEN)	James Atuti (KEN)
1981	Lemi Kipkirong (KEN)	John Anzrah (KEN)	Elijah Sogomo (KEN)
1982	Alfred Nyambane (KEN)	Alfred Nyambane (KEN)	James Atuti (KEN)
1983	Peter Wekesa (KEN)	John Goville (UGA)	Mike Okot (UGA)
1984	Peter Wekesa (KEN)	David Kitur (KEN)	Elijah Sogomo (KEN)
1985	Peter Wekesa (KEN)	Simon Kipkemboi (KEN)	David Kitur (KEN)
1986	Peter Wekesa (KEN)	Simon Kipkemboi (KEN)	Alfred Nyambane (KEN)
1988	Kennedy Ondiek (KEN)	Joseph Gikonyo (KEN)	Luka Sang (KEN)
1989	Moses Musonge (UGA)	Samson Kitur (KEN)	Samson Kitur (KEN)
1990	Joel Otim (UGA)	John Goville (UGA)	Joel Otim (UGA)

=== Distance events ===
Year	800 metres	1500 metres	5000 metres	10,000 metres
1961	Kiptergech Kesio (KEN)	Peter Francis (KEN)	Anthony Ngatia (KEN)	Nyabera (KEN)
1964	Wilson Kiprugut (KEN)	Kip Keino (KEN)	?	Naftali Temu (KEN)
1967	Wilson Kiprugut (KEN)	Kip Keino (KEN)	Kip Keino (KEN)	Naftali Temu (KEN)
1968	Wilson Kiprugut (KEN)	Ben Jipcho (KEN)	Kip Keino (KEN)	Naftali Temu (KEN)
1969	Naftali Bon (KEN)	Kip Keino (KEN)	Kip Keino (KEN)	Naftali Temu (KEN)
1970	Naftali Bon (KEN)	Kip Keino (KEN)	Kip Keino (KEN)	Wuhib Masresha (ETH)
1971	Thomas Saisi (KEN)	Ben Jipcho (KEN)	Kip Keino (KEN)	?
1972	Kip Keino (KEN)	Filbert Bayi (TAN)	Ben Jipcho (KEN)	Richard Juma (KEN)
1975	Daniel Omwanza (KEN)	Filbert Bayi (TAN)	Miruts Yifter (ETH)	Miruts Yifter (ETH)
1976	Daniel Omwanza (KEN)	Filbert Bayi (TAN)	Miruts Yifter (ETH)	Miruts Yifter (ETH)
1977	James Maina (KEN)	Kipsubai Koskei (KEN)	Mike Musyoki (KEN)	Mike Musyoki (KEN)
1979	James Maina (KEN)	Kassa Belcha (ETH)	Yohannes Mohamed (ETH)	Mohamed Kedir (ETH)
1981	Juma Ndiwa (KEN)	Samson Obwocha (KEN)	Jackson Ruto (KEN)	Alfred Nyasani (KEN)
1982	Juma Ndiwa (KEN)	Kip Cheruiyot (KEN)	Erastus Kemei (KEN)	Hussein Ahmed Salah (DJI)
1983	Sisa Kirati (KEN)	Sisa Kirati (KEN)	Some Muge (KEN)	Some Muge (KEN)
1984	Charles Onsare (KEN)	Joseph Chesire (KEN)	Kipsubai Koskei (KEN)	Juma Ikangaa (TAN)
1985	Joseph Chesire (KEN)	John Ngugi (KEN)	Jackson Ruto (KEN)	Kipsubai Koskei (KEN)
1986	Edwin Koech (KEN)	Getahun Ayana (ETH)	John Ngugi (KEN)	Kipsubai Koskei (KEN)
1988	Nixon Kiprotich (KEN)	Charles Cheruiyot (KEN)	Jackson Ruto (KEN)	Gidamis Shahanga (TAN)
1989	Sammy Tirop (KEN)	David Kibet (KEN)	Patrick Umbe (TAN)	Simon Robert Naali (TAN)
1990	Maximilian Irange (TAN)	Honest Umbe (TAN)	Andrew Sambu (TAN)	Juma Mnyampanda (TAN)

=== Hurdling ===
Year	110 m hurdles	400 m hurdles	3000 m steeplechase
1961	Langat (KEN)	Kimaru Songok (KEN)	Ngweta (KEN)
1964	?	Jerom Ochana (UGA)	Benjamin Kogo (KEN)
1967	Samuel Bor (KEN)	Samuel Sang (KEN)	Benjamin Kogo (KEN)
1968	Kimaru Songok (KEN)	Kimaru Songok (KEN)	Benjamin Kogo (KEN)
1969	John Akii-Bua (UGA)	William Koskei (UGA)	Ben Jipcho (KEN)
1970	John Kiplangat (KEN)	Charles Kipkemboi Yego (KEN)	Ben Jipcho (KEN)
1971	John Kiplangat (KEN)	John Akii-Bua (UGA)	Ben Jipcho (KEN)
1972	Fatwell Kimaiyo (KEN)	William Koskei (KEN)	Evans Mogaka (KEN)
1975	Fatwell Kimaiyo (KEN)	John Akii-Bua (UGA)	Yohannes Mohamed (ETH)
1976	Fatwell Kimaiyo (KEN)	Peter Rwamuhanda (UGA)	Yohannes Mohamed (ETH)
1977	Philip Sang (KEN)	William Koskei (KEN)	Nelsensio Byingingo (UGA)
1979	Philip Sang (KEN)	Daniel Kimaiyo (KEN)	Kip Rono (KEN)
1981	Philip Sang (KEN)	Peter Kipchumba (KEN)	Hillary Tuwei (KEN)
1982	Philip Sang (KEN)	Peter Rwamuhanda (UGA)	Joshua Kipkemboi (KEN)
1983	Philip Sang (KEN)	Simon Kitur (KEN)	Joshua Kipkemboi (KEN)
1984	Philip Sang (KEN)	Simon Kitur (KEN)	Wilson Musonik (KEN)
1985	Hisham Mohamed Makin (EGY)	Ahmed Abdel Halim Ghanem (EGY)	Joshua Kipkemboi (KEN)
1986	Charles Kokoyo (KEN)	Simon Kitur (KEN)	Joshua Kipkemboi (KEN)
1988	?	Joseph Maritim (KEN)	Boniface Merande (KEN)
1989	Shem Ochako (KEN)	Shem Ochako (KEN)	Solomon Mitei (KEN)
1990	Eric Anyuru (UGA)	Domingos Mendes (MOZ)	Antony Mwangereza (TAN)

=== Jumps ===
Year	Pole vault	High jump	Long jump	Triple jump
1961	Kiprop Koech (KEN)	Joseph Leresae (KEN)	Paul Odhiambo (KEN)	Lawrence Ogwang (UGA)
1964	?	?	?	Rukuba (UGA)
1967	Kiprop Koech (KEN)	E. Mumo (KEN)	Julius Sang (KEN)	Patrick Onyango (KEN)
1968	Kiprop Koech (KEN)	Edward Malakwen (KEN)	Moses Nyaigoti (KEN)	Jack Buga (UGA)
1969	Kiprop Koech (KEN)	Edward Malakwen (KEN)	Abraham Munabi (UGA)	Abraham Munabi (UGA)
1970	Kiprop Koech (KEN)	Abdulle Noor Wasughe (SOM)	Henry Rono (KEN)	Jack Buga (UGA)
1971	Patrick Oriana (UGA)	Abdulle Noor Wasughe (SOM)	John Okuthe (KEN)	John Okuthe (KEN)
1972	Ezechiel Chepkwony (KEN)	Abdulle Noor Wasughe (SOM)	Joshua Limo (KEN)	Abraham Munabi (UGA)
1975	Joseph Kitur (KEN)	Willie Rotich (KEN)	Bogger Mushanga (ZAM)	Joshua Limo (KEN)
1976	J. Kipkeno (KEN)	Francis Senkaba (UGA)	Fidelis Ndyabagye (UGA)	Joshua Limo (KEN)
1977	Joseph Kitur (KEN)	Ali Mohammed Mudey (SOM)	Fidelis Ndyabagye (UGA)	William Bisereko (UGA)
1979	?	?	Fidelis Ndyabagye (UGA)	Bogger Mushanga (ZAM)
1981	Japhet Kiplimo (KEN)	Nathan Rotich (KEN)	Moses Kiyai (KEN)	Charles Kokoyo (KEN)
1982	Shawki Hassan Abdallah (EGY)	Ahmed Mohamed Fahmi (EGY)	Moses Kiyai (KEN)	Moses Kiyai (KEN)
1983	B. Akena (UGA)	Nathan Rotich (KEN)	Mohamed Kharib Mansour (EGY)	Ahmed Hassan Badra (EGY)
1984	Walid Riad Hussein (EGY)	Nathan Rotich (KEN)	Moses Kiyai (KEN)	Ahmed Hassan Badra (EGY)
1985	Issam Fathi Hassan (EGY)	Ahmed Mohamed Fahmi (EGY)	Ihab Ibrahim Abdel Hamid (EGY)	Ahmed Hassan Badra (EGY)
1986	Simon Maina (KEN)	Nathan Rotich (KEN)	Benson Mugun (KEN)	James Kipngetich (KEN)
1988	?	?	David Lamai (KEN)	?
1989	?	Bernard Rotich (KEN)	Amos Rutere (KEN)	William Bisereko (UGA)
1990	?	A. Odwong (UGA)	Bua Okello (UGA)	?

=== Throws ===
Year	Shot put	Discus throw	Hammer throw	Javelin throw
1961	Yovan Ochola (UGA)	Winder (KEN)	Yovan Ochola (UGA)	Mamboria Tesot (KEN)
1964	?	?	?	Mamboria Tesot (KEN)
1967	Yovan Ochola (UGA)	Philip Otieno (KEN)	Anthony Kipruto (KEN)	Wilson Kiptalam (KEN)
1968	Yovan Ochola (UGA)	Philip Otieno (KEN)	Anthony Kipruto (KEN)	John Okello-Nono (UGA)
1969	Yovan Ochola (UGA)	Philip Otieno (KEN)	Anthony Kipruto (KEN)	John Okello-Nono (UGA)
1970	Yovan Ochola (UGA)	Philip Otieno (KEN)	Anthony Kipruto (KEN)	John Mayaka (KEN)
1971	Samuel Kassaye (ETH)	Philip Otieno (KEN)	Yovan Ochola (UGA)	John Mayaka (KEN)
1972	Samuel Onyac (UGA)	Walter Otim (UGA)	Gabriel Luzira (UGA)	John Mayaka (KEN)
1975	Samuel Kassaye (ETH)	Samuel Onyac (UGA)	Gabriel Luzira (UGA)	John Mayaka (KEN)
1976	Samuel Kassaye (ETH)	Samuel Onyac (UGA)	Gabriel Luzira (UGA)	Justin Arop (UGA)
1977	Michael Obange (KEN)	Peter Okot Omony (UGA)	Gabriel Luzira (UGA)	Justin Arop (UGA)
1979	Joshua Limo (KEN)	Peter Okot Omony (UGA)	David Mitala (UGA)	Zakayo Malekwa (TAN)
1981	Youssef Nagui Asaad (EGY)	Mohamed Naguib Hamed (EGY)	Hisham Fouad Greis (EGY)	Justin Arop (UGA)
1982	Youssef Nagui Asaad (EGY)	Ahmed Mohamed Ashoush (EGY)	Hisham Fouad Greis (EGY)	Justin Arop (UGA)
1983	Ahmed Kamel Shata (EGY)	Mohamed Naguib Hamed (EGY)	Hisham Abdeslam Zaki (EGY)	George Odera (UGA)
1984	Ahmed Kamel Shata (EGY)	Mohamed Naguib Hamed (EGY)	Ahmed Ibrahim Taha (EGY)	George Odera (UGA)
1985	Ahmed Kamel Shata (EGY)	Mohamed Naguib Hamed (EGY)	Ahmed Ibrahim Taha (EGY)	Justin Arop (UGA)
1986	Simon Murei (KEN)	Joshua Pondo (KEN)	Peter Monyancha (KEN)	George Odera (KEN)
1988	Joshua Pondo (KEN)	?	?	Zakayo Malekwa (TAN)
1989	Justin Arop (UGA)	Daniel Kimeli Tanui (KEN)	Cornelius Kemboi (KEN)	Justin Arop (UGA)
1990	S. Lakwenyero (UGA)	Lawrence Oyet (UGA)	S. Lutara (UGA)	Justin Arop (UGA)

=== Relays ===
Year	4 × 100 metres relay	4 × 400 metres relay
1961	Uganda (UGA)	Kenya (KEN)
1964	?	Uganda (UGA)
1967	Kenya (KEN)	Kenya (KEN)
1968	Kenya (KEN)	Kenya (KEN)
1969	Kenya (KEN)	Kenya (KEN)
1970	Tanzania (TAN)	Kenya (KEN)
1971	Kenya (KEN)	Kenya (KEN)
1972	Kenya (KEN)	Kenya (KEN)
1975	?	Uganda (UGA)
1976	Kenya (KEN)	Kenya (KEN)
1977	Kenya (KEN)	Kenya (KEN)
1979	Kenya (KEN)	Kenya (KEN)
1981	Uganda (UGA)	Uganda (UGA)
1982	Kenya (KEN)	Kenya (KEN)
1983	Uganda (UGA)	Uganda (UGA)
1984	Kenya (KEN)	Kenya (KEN)
1985	Kenya (KEN)	Kenya (KEN)
1986	Kenya (KEN)	Kenya (KEN)
1988	Kenya (KEN)	Kenya (KEN)
1989	Uganda (UGA)	—
1990	?	?

=== Marathon ===
- 1968: James Wahome (KEN) (2:23:39†)
- 1969: Stephen Akhwari (TAN) (2:33:06A)
- 1970: Yetneberk Belte (ETH) (2:18:49A)
- 1971: Gebru Merawi (ETH) (2:21:22A)
- 1972: John Kambole (ZAM) (2:39:23)
- 1976: Guebre Gurmu (ETH) (2:13:25)
- 1977: Emanuel Namando (TAN) (2:18:55)
- 1979: Dereje Nedi (ETH) (2:22:13)
- 1981: Getachew Kebede (ETH) (2:17:35)

== Women's champions ==
=== Sprints ===
Year	100 metres	200 metres	400 metres
1967	Lydia Stevens (KEN)	Tekla Chemabwai (KEN)	Tekla Chemabwai (KEN)
1968	Judith Ayaa (UGA)	Tekla Chemabwai (KEN)	Tekla Chemabwai (KEN)
1969	Judith Ayaa (UGA)	Judith Ayaa (UGA)	Judith Ayaa (UGA)
1970	Judith Ayaa (UGA)	Judith Ayaa (UGA)	Judith Ayaa (UGA)
1971	Emily Kubasu (KEN)	Tekla Chemabwai (KEN)	Judith Ayaa (UGA)
1972	Alice Adala (KEN)	Grace Munene (ZAM)	Judith Ayaa (UGA)
1975	Alice Adala (KEN)	Alice Adala (KEN)	A. Kaheru (UGA)
1976	Alice Adala (KEN)	Christine Byobona (UGA)	Ruth Kyalisima (UGA)
1977	Ruth Waithera (KEN)	Ruth Waithera (KEN)	Ruth Waithera (KEN)
1979	Ruth Waithera (KEN)	Ruth Waithera (KEN)	Ruth Waithera (KEN)
1981	Harriet Naitore (KEN)	Harriet Naitore (KEN)	Mary Chemweno (KEN)
1982	Joyce Odhiambo (KEN)	Joyce Odhiambo (KEN)	Ruth Atuti (KEN)
1983	Joyce Odhiambo (KEN)	Ruth Kyalisima (UGA)	Ruth Atuti (KEN)
1984	Joyce Odhiambo (KEN)	Leticia Athanas (TAN)	?
1985	Joyce Odhiambo (KEN)	Esther Kavaya (KEN)	Esther Kavaya (KEN)
1986	Joyce Odhiambo (KEN)	Joyce Odhiambo (KEN)	Geraldine Shitandayi (KEN)
1988	Joyce Odhiambo (KEN)	Pharis Wanja (KEN)	Esther Kavaya (KEN)
1989	Oliver Acii (UGA)	Oliver Acii (UGA)	Ruth Kyalisima (UGA)
1990	Teddy Kunihira (UGA)	Teddy Kunihira (UGA)	Jane Ajilo (UGA)

=== Distance events ===
Year	800 metres	1500 metres	3000 metres
1967	Gladys Njeri (KEN)	—	—
1968	Elizabeth Chesire (KEN)	—	—
1969	R. Cherop (KEN)	—	—
1970	R. Cherop (KEN)	Elizabeth Chelimo (KEN)	—
1971	Mary Wambui (KEN)	Elizabeth Chelimo (KEN)	—
1972	Christine Anyakun (UGA)	Jennie Mboma (TAN)	—
1975	Rose Tata (KEN)	Anna Kiprop (KEN)	—
1976	Alice Amacar (UGA)	Theresia Chalamila (TAN)	Rose Tata (KEN)
1977	Mary Chemweno (KEN)	Waima Kiteti (KEN)	Magdalena Wangare (KEN)
1979	Mary Chemweno (KEN)	Elizabeth Onyambu (KEN)	Rose Thomson (KEN)
1981	Mary Chemweno (KEN)	Justina Chepchirchir (KEN)	Justina Chepchirchir (KEN)
1982	Clara Bwalei (KEN)	Justina Chepchirchir (KEN)	Justina Chepchirchir (KEN)
1983	Agnes Nafuna Famba (KEN)	Susan Sirma (KEN)	Hellen Kimaiyo (KEN)
1984	Justina Chepchirchir (KEN)	Mary Chepkemboi (KEN)	Hellen Kimaiyo (KEN)
1985	Selina Chirchir (KEN)	Hellen Kimaiyo (KEN)	Hellen Kimaiyo (KEN)
1986	Lilian Nyiti (TAN)	Selina Chirchir (KEN)	Susan Sirma (KEN)^{[nb1]}
1988	Francisca Chepkurui (KEN)	Susan Sirma (KEN)	Anne Wangari (KEN)
1989	Lilian Nyiti (TAN)	Josephine Nate (TAN)	—
1990	Elizabeth Tungaraza (TAN)	Maria Mutola (MOZ)	Beatrice Ayikoru (UGA)

- ^{nb1} Women's 3000 m was not contested in 1986 and instead a women's 5000 m was held.

=== Throws ===
Year	100 m hurdles	400 m hurdles	High jump	Long jump
1967	Rosemary Namusisi (UGA)	—	Caroline Nyankori (UGA)	Christine Kabanda (UGA)
1968	Rosemary Namusisi (UGA)	—	Rose Nyaguthi (KEN)	Christine Kabanda (UGA)
1969	Ann Cherotich (KEN)	—	Caroline Nyankori (UGA)	Christine Kabanda (UGA)
1970	Budesia Nyakecho (UGA)	—	Rose Nyaguthi (KEN)	Rebecca Chiagi (KEN)
1971	Ann Cherotich (KEN)	—	Magdalena Chesire (KEN)	Audrey Chikani (ZAM)
1972	Rebby James (KEN)	—	Rose Nyaguthi (KEN)	Christine Kabanda (UGA)
1975	Ruth Kyalisima (UGA)	—	Jane Nakamate (UGA)	Christine Kabanda (UGA)
1976	Ruth Kyalisima (UGA)	—	Caromella Mumbi (ZAM)	Christine Kabanda (UGA)
1977	Ruth Kyalisima (UGA)	—	Christine Kabanda (UGA)	Christine Kabanda (UGA)
1979	Ruth Kyalisima (UGA)	Rose Tata (TAN)	Charity Muhuhe (KEN)	Christine Kabanda (UGA)
1981	Alice Adala (KEN)	—	Alice Chepchirchir (KEN)	Margaret Bisereko (UGA)
1982	Ruth Kyalisima (UGA)	Ruth Kyalisima (UGA)	Rosettee Kaggwa (UGA)	Jacinta Serete (KEN)
1983	Ruth Kyalisima (UGA)	Ruth Kyalisima (UGA)	Rosettee Kaggwa (UGA)	Margaret Ayoo (UGA)
1985	Selina Jeruto (KEN)	Selina Jeruto (KEN)	Rebecca Chepkoech (KEN)	Joyce Odhiambo (KEN)
1986	—	—	Lenah Serem (KEN)	Joyce Odhiambo (KEN)
1988	?	?	?	Ruth Onsarigo (KEN)
1989	Ruth Kyalisima (UGA)	Ruth Kyalisima (UGA)	Victoria Mwase (ZAM)	Wata Lupapa (TAN)
1990	Zulfa Mohammed (TAN)	Rebecca Nambogo (UGA)	J. Achola (UGA)	—

=== Throws ===
Year	Shot put	Discus throw	Javelin throw
1967	Anastasia Wanja (KEN)	F. Mudondo (UGA)	Dorcas Sigara (KEN)
1968	R. Mandu (KEN)	S. Agono (KEN)	P. Peru (KEN)
1969	Anastasia Wanja (KEN)	F. Mudondo (UGA)	Dorcas Sigara (KEN)
1970	F. Mudondo (UGA)	F. Mudondo (UGA)	Dorcas Sigara (UGA)
1971	Bihla Akenga (KEN)	Nancy Mtawali (TAN)	Lilian Cherotic (KEN)
1972	Betty Akello (UGA)	Herina Malit (KEN)	Constance Rwabiryagye (UGA)
1975	Herina Malit (KEN)	Betty Akello (UGA)	Lilian Cherotic (KEN)
1976	Betty Akello (UGA)	Helen Alyek (UGA)	Elizabeth Anjala (KEN)
1977	Joyce Aciro (UGA)	Helen Alyek (UGA)	Constance Rwabiryagye (UGA)
1979	Joyce Aciro (UGA)	Helen Alyek (UGA)	Eunice Nekesa (KEN)
1981	Elizabeth Olaba (KEN)	Helen Alyek (UGA)	Constance Rwabiryagye (UGA)
1982	Elizabeth Olaba (KEN)	Helen Alyek (UGA)	Eunice Nekesa (KEN)
1983	Catherine Nyamko (TAN)	Helen Alyek (UGA)	Seraphina Nyauma (KEN)
1984	Catherine Nyamko (TAN)	Phyllis Macharia (KEN)	Esther Chepkemboi (KEN)
1985	Mariette van Heerden (ZIM)	Mariette van Heerden (ZIM)	Samia Mohamed (EGY)
1986	Herina Malit (KEN)	Helen Alyek (UGA)	Milka Johnson (KEN)
1988	Elizabeth Olaba (KEN)	?	Catherine Nyamko (TAN)
1989	Bupe Andambike (TAN)	Alfamande Somi (TAN)	Matilda Kisava (TAN)
1990	Bupe Andambike (TAN)	Ludovina de Oliveira (MOZ)	Matilda Kisava (TAN)

=== Relays ===
Year	4 × 100 metres relay	4 × 400 metres relay
1967	Uganda (UGA)	—
1968	Kenya (KEN)	—
1969	Uganda (UGA)	—
1970	Kenya (KEN)	Kenya (KEN)
1971	Uganda (UGA)	Uganda (UGA)
1972	Uganda (UGA)	Kenya (KEN)
1975	?	Kenya (KEN)
1976	Uganda (UGA)	Uganda (UGA)
1977	Uganda (UGA)	Kenya (KEN)
1979	Kenya (KEN)	Kenya (KEN)
1981	Kenya (KEN)	Uganda (UGA)
1982	Uganda (UGA)	Uganda (UGA)
1983	Kenya (KEN)	Uganda (UGA)
1985	Kenya (KEN)	Kenya (KEN)
1986	—	Kenya (KEN)
1989	Uganda (UGA)	Tanzania (TAN)
1990	Uganda (UGA)	Uganda (UGA)
