= Athletics at the 1964 Summer Olympics – Men's 400 metres hurdles =

Men's 400 metres hurdles at the Games of the XVIII Olympiad
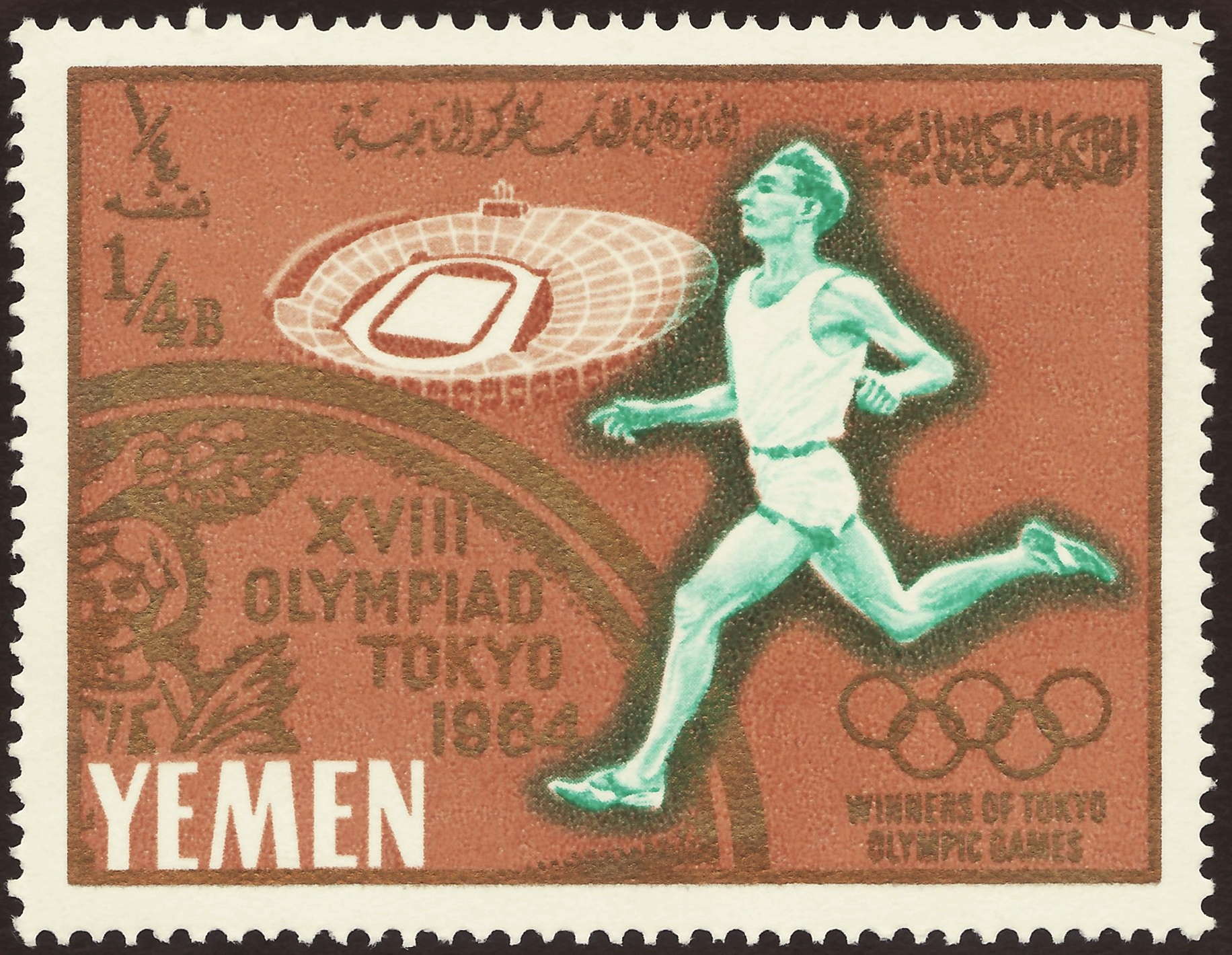
- Yemeni stamp commemorating 1964 Olympic athletics
- Venue: Olympic Stadium
- Dates: 14–16 October 1964
- Competitors: 39 from 26 nations
- Winning time: 49.6

Medalists
| 1st place, gold medalist(s) | | Rex Cawley; United States |
| 2nd place, silver medalist(s) | | John Cooper; Great Britain |
| 3rd place, bronze medalist(s) | | Salvatore Morale; Italy |

The men's 400 metres hurdles was the longer of the men's hurdle races in the Athletics at the 1964 Summer Olympics program in Tokyo. It was held on 14 October, 15 October, and 16 October 1964. 39 athletes from 26 nations competed, with 1 more not starting in the first round. The maximum number of athletes per nation had been set at 3 since the 1930 Olympic Congress. The first round was held on 14 October, with the semifinals on 15 October and the final on 16 October. The event was won by Rex Cawley of the United States, the nation's sixth consecutive and 11th overall victory in the men's 400 metres hurdles. For the first time since 1952, the Americans did not sweep the event. John Cooper earned Great Britain's first medal in the event since 1928 with his silver; Salvatore Morale took Italy's first-ever medal in the 400 metres hurdles with his bronze.

== Background ==
This was the 13th time the event was held. It had been introduced along with the men's 200 metres hurdles in 1900, with the 200 being dropped after 1904 and the 400 being held through 1908 before being left off the 1912 programme. However, when the Olympics returned in 1920 after World War I, the men's 400 metres hurdles was back and would continue to be contested at every Games thereafter.

None of the six finalists from the 1960 Games returned. American Rex Cawley was the favorite after setting a world record at the U.S. trials; he was also the 1963 AAU champion.

Malaysia, Peru, Senegal, and Uganda each made their debut in the event. The United States made its 13th appearance, the only nation to have competed at every edition of the event to that point.

== Competition format ==
The competition used the three-round format used every Games since 1908 (except the four-round competition in 1952): heats, semifinals, and a final. Ten sets of hurdles were set on the course. The hurdles were 3 feet (91.5 centimetres) tall and were placed 35 metres apart beginning 45 metres from the starting line, resulting in a 40 metres home stretch after the last hurdle. The 400 metres track was standard.

The format also continued to use the "fastest loser" system introduced in 1960. The 1964 event standardized later-round heat sizes at 8 rather than 6.

There were 5 first round heats with 8 athletes each (before one withdrawal). The top 3 men in each heat advanced to the semifinals, along with the next fastest hurdler overall. The 16 semifinalists were divided into 2 semifinals of 8 athletes each, with the top 4 in each semifinal advancing to the 8-man final.

== Records ==
Prior to the competition, the existing world and Olympic records were as follows.

| World record | Rex Cawley (USA) | 49.1 | Los Angeles, United States | 13 September 1964 |
| Olympic record | Glenn Davis (USA) | 49.3 | Rome, Italy | 2 September 1960 |

No new world or Olympic records were set during the competition.

== Schedule ==
All times are Japan Standard Time (UTC+9)

| Date | Time | Round |
|---|---|---|
| Wednesday, 14 October 1964 | 14:00 | Heats |
| Thursday, 15 October 1964 | 14:15 | Semifinals |
| Friday, 16 October 1964 | 16:00 | Final |

== Results ==
=== Heats ===
The top three runners in each of the 5 heats as well as the fastest remaining runner advanced.

==== Heat 1 ====
| Rank | Athlete | Nation | Time (hand) | Time (automatic) | Notes |
|---|---|---|---|---|---|
| 1 | John Cooper | Great Britain | 50.5 | 50.58 | Q |
| 2 | Gary Knoke | Australia | 50.9 | 50.94 | Q |
| 3 | Roberto Frinolli | Italy | 51.2 | 51.23 | Q |
| 4 | Edvins Zageris | Soviet Union | 51.5 | 51.59 | q |
| 5 | Bill Gairdner | Canada | 53.8 | – | |
| 6 | Helmut Haid | Austria | 54.6 | – | |
| — | Horst Gieseler | United Team of Germany | DNF | – | |
| — | Nicola Dimitrov Dagorov | Bulgaria | DNS | – | |

==== Heat 2 ====
| Rank | Athlete | Nation | Time (hand) | Time (automatic) | Notes |
|---|---|---|---|---|---|
| 1 | Rex Cawley | United States | 50.8 | 50.88 | Q |
| 2 | Juan Carlos Dyrzka | Argentina | 51.1 | 51.17 | Q |
| 3 | Peter Warden | Great Britain | 51.6 | 51.61 | Q |
| 4 | Joachim Singer | United Team of Germany | 52.1 | – | |
| 5 | Bogusław Gierajewski | Poland | 52.8 | – | |
| 6 | Samir Ambrose Vincent | Iraq | 54.0 | – | |
| 7 | Kiyoo Yui | Japan | 54.7 | – | |
| 8 | Michael Ryan | Australia | 58.0 | – | |

==== Heat 3 ====
| Rank | Athlete | Nation | Time (hand) | Time (automatic) | Notes |
|---|---|---|---|---|---|
| 1 | Wilfried Geeroms | Belgium | 51.2 | 51.24 | Q |
| 2 | Ken Roche | Australia | 51.5 | 51.52 | Q |
| 3 | Jay Luck | United States | 51.7 | 51.77 | Q |
| 4 | Jerom Ochana | Uganda | 52.4 | – | |
| 5 | Robert Poirier | France | 52.6 | – | |
| 6 | Valeriu Jurca | Romania | 52.7 | – | |
| 7 | Kimaru Songok | Kenya | 54.5 | – | |
| 8 | Mansour ul-Haq Awan | Pakistan | 55.3 | – | |

==== Heat 4 ====
Anisimov is listed in the Official Report results for heat 4 as being a competitor for the United States; however, the Official Report lists his nationality as Soviet in all other instances in the report.

| Rank | Athlete | Nation | Time (hand) | Time (automatic) | Notes |
|---|---|---|---|---|---|
| 1 | Salvatore Morale | Italy | 51.1 | 51.17 | Q |
| 2 | Vasyl Anisimov | Soviet Union | 51.7 | 51.72 | Q |
| 3 | Ferdinand Haas | United Team of Germany | 52.2 | – | Q |
| 4 | Mike Hogan | Great Britain | 52.5 | – | |
| 5 | Keiji Ogushi | Japan | 53.6 | – | |
| 6 | José Cavero | Peru | 53.7 | – | |
| 7 | Karu Selvaratnam | Malaysia | 53.8 | – | |
| — | Ðani Kovač | Yugoslavia | DSQ | – | |

==== Heat 5 ====
| Rank | Athlete | Nation | Time (hand) | Time (automatic) | Notes |
|---|---|---|---|---|---|
| 1 | Billy Hardin | United States | 51.3 | 51.37 | Q |
| 2 | Víctor Maldonado | Venezuela | 51.6 | 51.64 | Q |
| 3 | Jaakko Tuominen | Finland | 51.8 | 51.88 | Q |
| 4 | Jean-Jacques Behm | France | 52.2 | 52.20 | |
| 5 | Keiko Iijima | Japan | 52.8 | – | |
| 6 | Mamadou Sarr | Senegal | 53.2 | – | |
| 7 | Amrit Pal | India | 53.3 | – | |
| 8 | Imants Kukličs | Soviet Union | 53.3 | – | |

=== Semifinals ===
The fastest four runners of each of the two semifinals advanced to the final.

==== Semifinal 1 ====
| Rank | Athlete | Nation | Time (hand) | Time (automatic) | Notes |
|---|---|---|---|---|---|
| 1 | Rex Cawley | United States | 49.8 | 49.89 | Q |
| 2 | Roberto Frinolli | Italy | 50.2 | 50.28 | Q |
| 3 | Gary Knoke | Australia | 50.6 | 50.63 | Q |
| 4 | Wilfried Geeroms | Belgium | 51.0 | 51.00 | Q |
| 5 | Peter Warden | Great Britain | 51.2 | – | |
| 6 | Ferdinand Haas | United Team of Germany | 51.6 | – | |
| 7 | Edvin Zageris | Soviet Union | 52.2 | – | |
| 8 | Jaakko Tuominen | Finland | 54.0 | – | |

==== Semifinal 2 ====
| Rank | Athlete | Nation | Time (hand) | Time (automatic) | Notes |
|---|---|---|---|---|---|
| 1 | John Cooper | Great Britain | 50.4 | 50.40 | Q |
| 2 | Jay Luck | United States | 50.4 | 50.43 | Q |
| 3 | Salvatore Morale | Italy | 50.4 | 50.48 | Q |
| 4 | Vasyl Anisimov | Soviet Union | 50.7 | 50.72 | Q |
| 5 | Ken Roche | Australia | 50.8 | 50.86 | |
| 6 | Billy Hardin | United States | 50.9 | 50.90 | |
| 7 | Víctor Maldonado | Venezuela | 51.1 | 51.19 | |
| 8 | Juan Carlos Dyrzka | Argentina | 53.1 | – | |

=== Final ===
| Rank | Athlete | Nation | Time |
|---|---|---|---|
| 1st place, gold medalist(s) | Rex Cawley | United States | 49.6 |
| 2nd place, silver medalist(s) | John Cooper | Great Britain | 50.1 |
| 3rd place, bronze medalist(s) | Salvatore Morale | Italy | 50.1 |
| 4 | Gary Knoke | Australia | 50.4 |
| 5 | Jay Luck | United States | 50.5 |
| 6 | Roberto Frinolli | Italy | 50.7 |
| 7 | Vasyl Anisimov | Soviet Union | 51.1 |
| 8 | Wilfried Geeroms | Belgium | 51.4 |

== Results summary ==
| Rank | Athlete | Nation | Heats | Semifinals | Final |
|---|---|---|---|---|---|
| 1st place, gold medalist(s) | Rex Cawley | United States | 50.8 | 49.8 | 49.6 |
| 2nd place, silver medalist(s) | John Cooper | Great Britain | 50.5 | 50.4 | 50.1 |
| 3rd place, bronze medalist(s) | Salvatore Morale | Italy | 51.1 | 50.4 | 50.1 |
| 4 | Gary Knoke | Australia | 50.9 | 50.6 | 50.4 |
| 5 | Jay Luck | United States | 51.7 | 50.4 | 50.5 |
| 6 | Roberto Frinolli | Italy | 51.2 | 50.2 | 50.7 |
| 7 | Vasyl Anisimov | Soviet Union | 51.7 | 50.7 | 51.1 |
| 8 | Wilfried Geeroms | Belgium | 51.2 | 51.0 | 51.4 |
| 9 | Ken Roche | Australia | 51.5 | 50.8 | Did not advance |
| 10 | Billy Hardin | United States | 51.3 | 50.9 | Did not advance |
| 11 | Víctor Maldonado | Venezuela | 51.6 | 51.1 | Did not advance |
| 12 | Peter Warden | Great Britain | 51.6 | 51.2 | Did not advance |
| 13 | Ferdinand Haas | United Team of Germany | 52.2 | 51.6 | Did not advance |
| 14 | Edvin Zageris | Soviet Union | 51.5 | 52.2 | Did not advance |
| 15 | Juan Carlos Dyrzka | Argentina | 51.1 | 53.1 | Did not advance |
| 16 | Jaakko Tuominen | Finland | 51.8 | 54.0 | Did not advance |
| 17 | Joachim Singer | United Team of Germany | 52.1 | Did not advance | |
| 18 | Jean-Jacques Behm | France | 52.2 | Did not advance | |
| 19 | Jerom Ochana | Uganda | 52.4 | Did not advance | |
| 20 | Mike Hogan | Great Britain | 52.5 | Did not advance | |
| 21 | Robert Poirier | France | 52.6 | Did not advance | |
| 22 | Valeriu Jurca | Romania | 52.7 | Did not advance | |
| 23 | Bogusław Gierajewski | Poland | 52.8 | Did not advance | |
| 23 | Keiko Iijima | Japan | 52.8 | Did not advance | |
| 25 | Mamadou Sarr | Senegal | 53.2 | Did not advance | |
| 26 | Amrit Pal | India | 53.3 | Did not advance | |
| 26 | Imants Kukličs | Soviet Union | 53.3 | Did not advance | |
| 28 | Keiji Ogushi | Japan | 53.6 | Did not advance | |
| 29 | José Cavero | Peru | 53.7 | Did not advance | |
| 30 | Bill Gairdner | Canada | 53.8 | Did not advance | |
| 30 | Karu Selvaratnam | Malaysia | 53.8 | Did not advance | |
| 32 | Samir Ambrose Vincent | Iraq | 54.0 | Did not advance | |
| 33 | Kimaru Songok | Kenya | 54.5 | Did not advance | |
| 34 | Helmut Haid | Austria | 54.6 | Did not advance | |
| 35 | Kiyoo Yui | Japan | 54.7 | Did not advance | |
| 36 | Mansour ul-Haq Awan | Pakistan | 55.3 | Did not advance | |
| 37 | Michael Ryan | Australia | 58.0 | Did not advance | |
| — | Horst Gieseler | United Team of Germany | DNF | Did not advance | |
| — | Djani Kovac | Yugoslavia | DSQ | Did not advance | |
| — | Nicola Dimitrov Dagorov | Bulgaria | DNS | Did not advance | |
