= 1966 European Athletics Championships – Men's 400 metres hurdles =

Men's 400 metres hurdles at the European Athletics Championships

The men's 400 metres hurdles at the 1966 European Athletics Championships was held in Budapest, Hungary, at Népstadion on 31 August, 1 and 2 September 1966.

== Medalists ==
Gold	Roberto Frinolli; Italy
Silver	Gerd Lössdorfer; West Germany
Bronze	Robert Poirier; France

== Results ==
=== Final ===
2 September

Rank	Name	Nationality	Time	Notes
1st place, gold medalist(s)	Roberto Frinolli	Italy	49.8	
2nd place, silver medalist(s)	Gerd Lössdorfer	West Germany	50.3	
3rd place, bronze medalist(s)	Robert Poirier	France	50.5	
4	Vasyl Anisimov	Soviet Union	50.5	
5	Jaakko Tuominen	Finland	50.9	
6	Horst Gieseler	West Germany	51.2	
7	Jean-Jacques Behm	France	51.3	
8	Alain Hébrard	France	52.9	

=== Semi-finals ===
1 September

==== Semi-final 1 ====
Rank	Name	Nationality	Time	Notes
1	Roberto Frinolli	Italy	50.3	Q
2	Alain Hébrard	France	50.7	Q
3	Gerd Lössdorfer	West Germany	50.7	Q
4	Jaakko Tuominen	Finland	50.9	Q
5	Bertil Vistam	Sweden	52.1	
6	Robin Woodland	Great Britain	52.3	
7	Edvīns Zāģeris	Soviet Union	52.3	
8	Helmut Haid	Austria	53.6	

==== Semi-final 2 ====
Rank	Name	Nationality	Time	Notes
1	Horst Gieseler	West Germany	50.5	Q
2	Robert Poirier	France	50.6	Q
3	Vasyl Anisimov	Soviet Union	50.7	Q
4	Jean-Jacques Behm	France	50.7	Q
5	John Sherwood	Great Britain	50.7	
6	Wilfried Geeroms	Belgium	51.0	
7	Stanisław Gubiec	Poland	51.7	
8	Peter Warden	Great Britain	53.4	

=== Heats ===
31 August

==== Heat 1 ====
Rank	Name	Nationality	Time	Notes
1	Gerd Lössdorfer	West Germany	52.0	Q
2	Alain Hébrard	France	52.1	Q
3	Helmut Haid	Austria	52.8	Q
4	John Sherwood	Great Britain	54.2	Q
5	Cengiz Akıncı	Turkey	55.0	
6	Vincenc Kacagjeli	Albania	55.8	

==== Heat 2 ====
Rank	Name	Nationality	Time	Notes
1	Roberto Frinolli	Italy	51.0	Q
2	Jean-Jacques Behm	France	52.2	Q
3	Bertil Vistam	Sweden	52.3	Q
4	Robin Woodland	Great Britain	52.7	Q
5	Gerd Hennige	West Germany	54.6	

==== Heat 3 ====
Rank	Name	Nationality	Time	Notes
1	Horst Gieseler	West Germany	51.1	Q
2	Vasyl Anisimov	Soviet Union	51.8	Q
3	Stanisław Gubiec	Poland	52.1	Q
4	Peter Warden	Great Britain	52.4	Q
5	John Skjelvaag	Norway	52.6	
6	Ferenc Oros	Hungary	53.4	

==== Heat 4 ====
Rank	Name	Nationality	Time	Notes
1	Robert Poirier	France	51.3	Q
2	Jaakko Tuominen	Finland	51.6	Q
3	Edvīns Zāģeris	Soviet Union	52.1	Q
4	Wilfried Geeroms	Belgium	52.4	Q
5	Leif Librand	Sweden	52.6	
6	Luigi Carrozza	Italy	52.9	

== Participation ==
According to an unofficial count, 23 athletes from 14 countries participated in the event.

- Albania (1)
- Austria (1)
- Belgium (1)
- Finland (1)
- France (3)
- Hungary (1)
- Italy (2)
- Norway (1)
- Poland (1)
- Soviet Union (2)
- Sweden (2)
- Turkey (1)
- Great Britain (3)
- West Germany (3)
