= Athletics at the 1962 British Empire and Commonwealth Games – Men's 120 yards hurdles =

Men's 440 yards hurdles at the 1962 British Empire and Commonwealth Games
- Venue: Perry Lakes Stadium
- Date: 29 November 1962
- Competitors: 15 from 8 nations
- Winning time: 14.3

Medalists
gold medal	Ghulam Raziq	Pakistan
silver medal	Dave Prince	Australia
bronze medal	Laurie Taitt	England

The men's 120 yards hurdles at the 1962 British Empire and Commonwealth Games as part of the athletics programme was held at the Perry Lakes Stadium on Thursday 29 November 1962.

The top two runners in each of the three heats qualified for the final.

The event was won by Pakistan's Ghulam Raziq in 14.3 seconds, ahead of Australia's Dave Prince and Laurie Taitt from England who won bronze. This was Pakistan's only medal in the track and field program.

Uganda's Benson Ishiepai who won bronze in the 440 yards hurdles event, withdrew prior to the start of his heat.

== Records ==
World record	Martin Lauer (FRG); Lee Calhoun (USA)	13.2	Zürich, Switzerland; Bern, Switzerland	7 July 1959; 21 August 1960
Commonwealth record				
Games record	Tom Lavery (SAF)	14.0	Sydney, Australia	12 February 1938

== Heats ==
=== Heat 1 ===
Rank	Name	Nationality	Time	Notes
1	Laurie Taitt	England	14.3	Q
2	Michael Devlin	Australia	14.5	Q
3	Gary Knoke	Australia	14.6	
4	Charles Eswau	Uganda	15.0	
5	Iqbal Sahi	Pakistan	15.3	

=== Heat 2 ===
Rank	Name	Nationality	Time	Notes
1	Mick Daws	Australia	14.5	Q
2	Bob Birrell	England	14.6	Q
3	Danie Burger	Rhodesia and Nyasaland	14.8	
4	Logan Aikman	New Zealand	15.6	
	Kuda Ditta	Sarawak		DSQ

=== Heat 3 ===
Rank	Name	Nationality	Time	Notes
1	Ghulam Raziq	Pakistan	14.2	Q
2	Dave Prince	Australia	14.2	Q
3	Paul Dallow	New Zealand	15.1	
4	Christopher Salole	Aden	15.8	
	Benson Ishiepai	Uganda		DNS

== Final ==
Rank	Name	Nationality	Time	Notes
1st place, gold medalist(s)	Ghulam Raziq	Pakistan	14.3	
2nd place, silver medalist(s)	Dave Prince	Australia	14.4	
3rd place, bronze medalist(s)	Laurie Taitt	England	14.7	
4	Michael Devlin	Australia	14.9	
5	Mick Daws	Australia	14.9	
6	Bob Birrell	England	15.2	
