= Athletics at the 1966 British Empire and Commonwealth Games – Men's 440 yards hurdles =

Men's 440 yards hurdles at the 1966 British Empire and Commonwealth Games
- Venue: Independence Park, Kingston
- Dates: August 6 and 8, 1966

Medalists
gold medal	Ken Roche	Australia
silver medal	Kingsley Agbabokha	Nigeria
bronze medal	Peter Warden	England

The men's 440 yards hurdles event at the 1966 British Empire and Commonwealth Games was held on 6 and 8 August at the Independence Park in Kingston, Jamaica. It was the last time that the imperial distance was contested at the Games later being replaced by the 400 metres hurdles.

== Medalists ==
Medallists
Gold	Silver	Bronze
Ken Roche; Australia	Kingsley Agbabokha; Nigeria	Peter Warden; England

== Results ==
=== Heats ===
Qualification: First 4 in each heat (Q) qualify directly for the final.

Heats results
Rank	Heat	Name	Nationality	Time	Notes
1	1	Gary Knoke	Australia	51.34	Q
2	1	John Sherwood	England	51.7	Q
3	1	Robin Woodland	England	51.7	Q
4	1	Roger Johnson	New Zealand	51.7	Q
5	1	Samuel Sang	Kenya	52.5	
6	1	Tony Harper	Bermuda	53.8	
7	1	James Grant	Jamaica	56.5	
1	2	Kingsley Agbabokha	Nigeria	51.8	Q
2	2	Peter Warden	England	51.8	Q
3	2	Ken Roche	Australia	51.77	Q
4	2	Bill Gairdner	Canada	52.2	Q
5	2	David Prince	Australia	52.36	
6	2	Kimaru Songok	Kenya	54.3	
7	2	Colin Davey	Bermuda	54.6	
8	2	Charles Clarke	Jamaica	55.1	

=== Final ===
Final results
Rank	Name	Nationality	Time	Notes
1st place, gold medalist(s)	Ken Roche	Australia	50.95	
2nd place, silver medalist(s)	Kingsley Agbabokha	Nigeria	51.46	
3rd place, bronze medalist(s)	Peter Warden	England	51.54	
4	Robin Woodland	England	51.8	
5	Gary Knoke	Australia	51.94	
6	Bill Gairdner	Canada	52.3	
7	Roger Johnson	New Zealand	56.0	
	John Sherwood	England	DNS	
