= Athletics at the 1962 British Empire and Commonwealth Games – Men's 440 yards hurdles =

Men's 440 yards hurdles at the 1962 British Empire and Commonwealth Games
- Venue: Perry Lakes Stadium
- Date: 24 November 1962 (heats); 26 November 1962 (final)
- Competitors: 14 from 9 nations
- Winning time: 51.5

Medalists
gold medal	Ken Roche	Australia
silver medal	Kimaru Songok	Kenya
bronze medal	Benson Ishiepai	Uganda

The men's 440 yards hurdles at the 1962 British Empire and Commonwealth Games as part of the athletics programme was held at the Perry Lakes Stadium on Saturday 24 November and Monday 26 November 1962.

The top three runners in each of the two heats qualified for the final.

The event was won by Australian Ken Roche in 51.5 seconds, ahead of Kenya's Kimaru Songok and Benson Ishiepai from Uganda. Roche was trailing Songok at the final hurdle but managed to seal the victory over the final 10 yards by 0.4 seconds.

== Records ==
World record	Gert Potgieter (SAF)	49.3	Bloemfontein, South Africa	16 April 1960
Commonwealth record				
Games record	Gert Potgieter (SAF)	49.7	Cardiff, Wales	22 July 1958

== Heats ==
=== Heat 1 ===
Rank	Name	Nationality	Time	Notes
1	Benson Ishiepai	Uganda	52.0	Q
2	Gary Knoke	Australia	52.1	Q
3	Kimaru Songok	Kenya	52.6	Q
4	Dave Prince	Australia	53.7	
5	George Shepherd	Canada	54.3	
6	Kuda Ditta	Sarawak	55.7	
	Paul Dallow	New Zealand		DNF

=== Heat 2 ===
Rank	Name	Nationality	Time	Notes
1	Ken Roche	Australia	52.3	Q
2	Michael Devlin	Australia	52.5	Q
3	Chris Surety	England	53.8	Q
4	Karu Selvaratnam	Malaya	54.2	
5	Logan Aikman	New Zealand	56.2	
	Jerome Ochana	Uganda		DNF
	Ken Peters	Hong Kong		DNS

== Final ==
Rank	Name	Nationality	Time	Notes
1st place, gold medalist(s)	Ken Roche	Australia	51.5	
2nd place, silver medalist(s)	Kimaru Songok	Kenya	51.9	
3rd place, bronze medalist(s)	Benson Ishiepai	Uganda	52.3	
4	Gary Knoke	Australia	52.5	
5	Michael Devlin	Australia	52.6	
6	Chris Surety	England	53.3	
