= 1964 United States Olympic trials (track and field) =

1964 United States Olympic track and field trials
- Dates: September 12–13
- Host city: Los Angeles, United States
- Venue: Los Angeles Memorial Coliseum
- Level: Senior
- Type: Outdoor

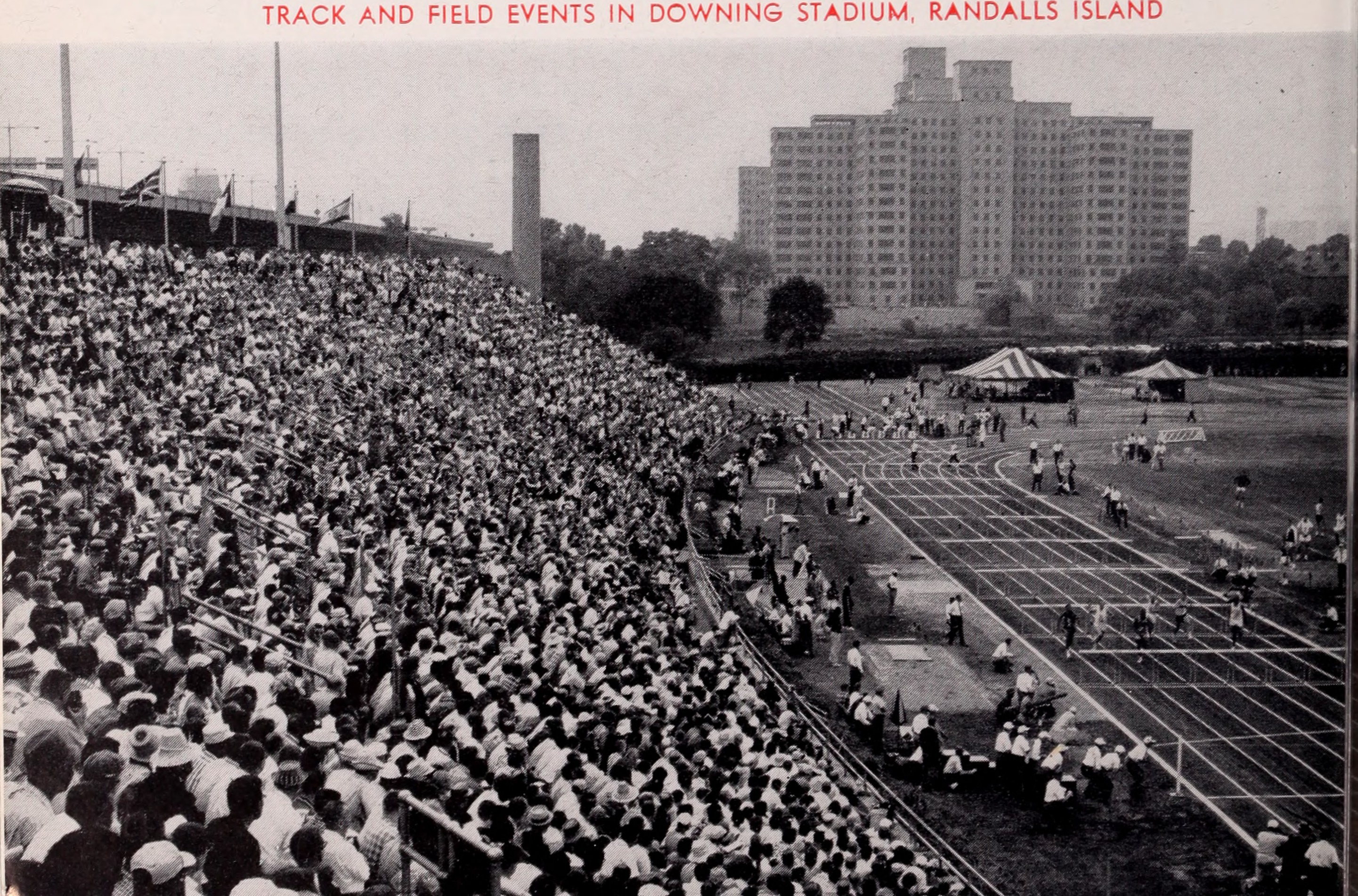
The 1964 U.S. Olympic track and field trials at Downing Stadium in Randalls Island

Video on YouTube

The men's 1964 United States Olympic trials for track and field were a two-tiered event. Athletes first met for semi-final Olympic trials at Downing Stadium in Randalls Island, New York, from July 3 to 4. The final trials were held at the Los Angeles Memorial Coliseum, Los Angeles, California, between September 12 and 13. The Coliseum had hosted the Olympics 32 years earlier and would come to host the Olympics a second time 20 years later. The races at Los Angeles were only the finals, selected from the top runners in the semi-final Olympic trials in New York. The 20 kilometer walk trials were held in Pittsburgh, Pennsylvania, on July 5, and the 50 kilometer walk trials were held on September 5 in Seattle, Washington. Two marathon trials were held, the AAU National Championships in Yonkers, New York, on May 24 selected one entrant, while the Western Hemisphere Marathon in Culver City, California, on July 26 selected two. American resident, but Taiwanese citizen C. K. Yang was allowed to participate in the decathlon, but his dominant performance did not displace the American athletes in the trials. The process was organized by the AAU.

The women's Olympic trials were held separately in Downing Stadium on Randalls Island, New York, between August 6 and 8.

== Men's results ==
Key: ≠ Athlete without "A" standard, not selected.

=== Men track events ===
Event	Gold		Silver		Bronze	
100 meters	Bob Hayes	10.1	Trenton Jackson	10.2	Mel Pender	10.3
200 meters^{[a]}	Paul Drayton	20.4	Dick Stebbins	20.6	Bob Hayes	20.7
400 meters	Mike Larrabee	44.9 =WR	Ulis Williams	45.0	Ollan Cassell	45.6
800 meters	Morgan Groth	1:47.1	Tom Farrell	1:48.0	Jerry Siebert	1:48.3
1500 meters	Dyrol Burleson	3:41.2	Tom O'Hara	3:41.5	Jim Ryun	3:41.9
5000 meters	Bob Schul; Bill Dellinger	13:55.6			Oscar Moore	13:58.8
10,000 meters	Gerry Lindgren	29:02.0	Billy Mills	29:10.4	Ron Larrieu	29:20.4
110 m hurdles	Willie Davenport	13.6	Hayes Jones	13.6	Blaine Lindgren	13.8
400 m hurdles	Rex Cawley	49.1 WR	Billy Hardin	49.8	Jay Luck	50.4
3000 m s'chase	George Young	8:44.2	Vic Zwolak	8:46.2	Jeff Fishback	8:55.8
20K racewalk	Ron Laird	1:34:45	Ron Zinn	1:36:37	Jack Mortland	1:37:05
50K racewalk	Chris McCarthy	4:45:31	Bruce MacDonald	4:49:22	Mike Brodie	4:55:21
AAU Marathon	Buddy Edelen	2:24:25.6 (selected)	Adolf Gruber	2:44:11.4	John J. Kelley	2:44:46.4
Western Hemisphere Marathon	Pete McArdle	2:27:01 (selected)	Billy Mills	2:27:29 (selected)	Jim Green	2:30:58

=== Men field events ===
Event	Gold		Silver		Bronze	
High jump	Ed Caruthers	2.08 m (6 ft 9 3/4 in)	John Thomas	2.08 m (6 ft 9 3/4 in)	John Rambo	2.03 m (6 ft 7 3/4 in)
Pole vault	Fred Hansen	5.03 m (16 ft 6 in)	John Pennel	5.03 m (16 ft 6 in)	Billy Pemelton	4.87 m (15 ft 11 1/2 in)
Long jump	Ralph Boston	8.49 m (27 ft 10 1/4 in)w 8.34 m (27 ft 4 1/4 in) WR	Gayle Hopkins	8.04 m (26 ft 4 1/2 in)	Phil Shinnick	8.01 m (26 ft 3 1/4 in)
Triple jump	Ira Davis	16.18 m (53 ft 1 in) 16.13	Bill Sharpe	16.18 m (53 ft 1 in) 15.80	Kent Floerke	15.55 m (51 ft 0 in)
Shot put	Dallas Long	19.74 m (64 ft 9 in)	Randy Matson	19.45 m (63 ft 9 1/2 in)	Parry O'Brien	19.25 m (63 ft 1 3/4 in)
Discus throw	Jay Silvester	60.55 m (198 ft 7 in)	Al Oerter	58.95 m (193 ft 4 in)	Dave Weill	58.28 m (191 ft 2 in)
Hammer throw	Hal Connolly	68.11 m (223 ft 5 in)	Ed Burke	65.55 m (215 ft 0 in)	Albert Hall	65.46 m (214 ft 9 in)
Javelin throw	Frank Covelli	77.05 m (252 ft 9 in)	Les Tipton	73.77 m (242 ft 0 in)	Ed Red	73.69 m (241 ft 9 in)
Decathlon	C. K. Yang Taiwan; Paul Herman	8641; 7853	Don Jeisy	7794	Russ Hodge	7678

==== Notes ====
^{a} Fourth place Henry Carr was selected instead of Hayes based on his superior performance in the Semi-Olympic trials. Carr went on to win the gold medal.

== Women's results ==
=== Women track events ===
Event	Gold		Silver		Bronze	
100 meters Wind aided	Edith McGuire	11.3w	Marilyn White	11.4w	Wyomia Tyus	11.5w
200 meters Wind aided	Edith McGuire	23.4w	Debbie Thompson	23.6w	Vivian Brown	23.7w
400 meters	Janell Smith	55.6	Patricia Clark	56.2	Valerie Carter	57.1
800 meters	Sandra Knott	2:13.1	Leah Ferris	2:14.8	Carol Mastronarde	2:15.0
80 m hurdles Wind aided	Rosie Bonds	10.8w	Cherrie Sherrard	10.9w	Lacey O'Neal	10.9w

=== Women field events ===
Event	Gold		Silver		Bronze	
High jump	Eleanor Montgomery	5 ft 8 in (1.72 m)	Terrezene Brown	5 ft 6 in (1.67 m)	Estelle Baskerville	5 ft 6 in (1.67 m)
Long jump	Willye White	6.50 m (21 ft 3 3/4 in)	Martha Watson	6.47 m (21 ft 2 1/2 in)	Jo Ann Grissom	6.08 m (19 ft 11 1/4 in)
Shot put	Earlene Brown	14.98 m (49 ft 1 3/4 in)	Lynn Graham	13.67 m (44 ft 10 in)	Cynthia Wyatt	12.99 m (42 ft 7 1/4 in)
Discus throw	Olga Connolly	49.51 m (162 ft 5 in)	Earlene Brown	45.52 m (149 ft 4 in)	Sharon Shepherd	44.84 m (147 ft 1 in)
Javelin throw	RaNae Bair	53.64 m (175 ft 11 in) NR	Virginia Husted	45.34 m (148 ft 9 in)	Lurline Hamilton	42.85 m (140 ft 7 in)
Pentathlon	Pat Winslow	4554	Sally Griffith	4225	Denise Paschal	4120
