= Frinolli =

Frinolli is an Italian surname. Notable people with the surname include:

- Giorgio Frinolli (born 1970), Italian sprint runner
- Roberto Frinolli (born 1940), Italian sprint runner, father of Giorgio
