= Athletics at the 1978 Commonwealth Games – Women's 800 metres =

Women's 800 metres at the Commonwealth Games

The women's 800 metres event at the 1978 Commonwealth Games was held on 8 and 10 August at the Commonwealth Stadium in Edmonton, Alberta, Canada.

== Medalists ==
Gold	Silver	Bronze
Judy Peckham; Australia	Tekla Chemabwai; Kenya	Jane Colebrook; England

== Results ==
=== Heats ===
Held on 8 August

Qualification: First 4 in each heat (Q) and the next 4 fastest (q) qualify for the semifinals.

Rank	Heat	Name	Nationality	Time	Notes
1	1	Liz Barnes	England	2:03.9	Q
2	1	Tekla Chemabwai	Kenya	2:05.1	Q
3	3	Evelyn McMeekin	Scotland	2:06.1	Q
4	3	Francine Gendron	Canada	2:06.5	Q
5	3	Jane Colebrook	England	2:06.7	Q
6	3	Judy Peckham	Australia	2:06.8	Q
7	2	Adrienne Smyth	Northern Ireland	2:07.5	Q
8	1	Carmen Campton	Australia	2:07.6	Q
9	2	Alison Wright	New Zealand	2:07.7	Q
10	2	Charlene Rendina	Australia	2:07.9	Q
11	2	Anne Mackie-Morelli	Canada	2:08.2	Q
12	1	Debbie Campbell	Canada	2:08.4	Q
12	3	Rose Tata	Kenya	2:08.4	q
14	2	Paula Newnham	England	2:09.7	q
15	1	Helen Opoku	Ghana	2:10.3	q
16	1	Pamela Reece	Northern Ireland	2:11.0	q
17	2	Gladys Konadu	Ghana	2:12.93	
18	2	Violet Molobeka	Zambia	2:15.02	
19	3	Helen Blake	Jamaica	2:20.79	
20	1	Theodora Corea	Saint Vincent and the Grenadines	2:22.20	
21	3	Jennifer Boca	Grenada	2:22.58	
22	3	Hannah Bantamoi	Sierra Leone	2:52.59	

=== Semifinals ===
Held on 8 August

Qualification: First 4 in each semifinal (Q) qualify directly for the final.

Rank	Heat	Name	Nationality	Time	Notes
1	1	Evelyn McMeekin	Scotland	2:02.99	Q
2	1	Charlene Rendina	Australia	2:04.78	Q
3	1	Jane Colebrook	England	2:04.78	Q
4	1	Anne Mackie-Morelli	Canada	2:05.05	Q
5	2	Judy Peckham	Australia	2:05.22	Q
6	2	Liz Barnes	England	2:05.38	Q
7	1	Debbie Campbell	Canada	2:05.47	
8	2	Francine Gendron	Canada	2:05.66	Q
9	2	Tekla Chemabwai	Kenya	2:05.71	Q
10	2	Adrienne Smyth	Northern Ireland	2:06.68	
11	2	Alison Wright	New Zealand	2:06.71	
12	1	Paula Newnham	England	2:07.68	
13	2	Carmen Campton	Australia	2:08.30	
14	1	Rose Tata	Kenya	2:13.72	
15	2	Helen Opoku	Ghana	2:18.79	
16	1	Pamela Reece	Northern Ireland	2:20.12	

=== Final ===
Held on 10 August

Rank	Name	Nationality	Time	Notes
1st place, gold medalist(s)	Judy Peckham	Australia	2:02.82	
2nd place, silver medalist(s)	Tekla Chemabwai	Kenya	2:02.87	
3rd place, bronze medalist(s)	Jane Colebrook	England	2:03.10	
4	Liz Barnes	England	2:03.41	
5	Francine Gendron	Canada	2:04.02	
6	Evelyn McMeekin	Scotland	2:04.10	
7	Anne Mackie-Morelli	Canada	2:04.16	
8	Charlene Rendina	Australia	2:04.82	
