= Athletics at the 1966 British Empire and Commonwealth Games – Men's 120 yards hurdles =

Men's 120 yards hurdles at the 1966 British Empire and Commonwealth Games
- Venue: Independence Park, Kingston
- Dates: August 11, 1966

Medalists
gold medal	David Hemery	England
silver medal	Mike Parker	England
bronze medal	Ghulam Raziq	Pakistan

The men's 120 yards hurdles event at the 1966 British Empire and Commonwealth Games was held on 11 August at the Independence Park in Kingston, Jamaica. It was the last time that the imperial distance was contested at the Games later replaced by the 110 metres hurdles.

== Medalists ==
Medallists
Gold	Silver	Bronze
David Hemery; England	Mike Parker; England	Ghulam Raziq; Pakistan

== Results ==
=== Heats ===
Qualification: First 2 in each heat (Q) and the next 2 fastest (q) qualify for the final.

Wind:
Heat 1: +1.2 m/s, Heat 2: +0.4 m/s, Heat 3: 0.0 m/s

Heats results: see qualification criteria for final
Rank	Heat	Name	Nationality	Time	Notes
1	1	David Hemery	England	14.2	Q
2	1	Ghulam Raziq	Pakistan	14.2	Q
3	1	David Prince	Australia	14.4	q
4	1	Folu Erinle	Nigeria	14.4	q
5	1	Michael Murray	Jamaica	15.0	
6	1	Kimaru Songok	Kenya	15.2	
1	2	Gurbachan Singh Randhawa	India	14.3	Q
2	2	Mike Parker	England	14.4	Q
3	2	Gary Knoke	Australia	14.9	
4	2	Anthony Carr	Jamaica	14.9	
	2	Samuel Sang	Kenya	DNF	
	2	Alfred Belleh	Nigeria	DQ	
1	3	Laurie Taitt	England	14.4	Q
2	3	Ray Harvey	Jamaica	14.6	Q
3	3	Bill Gairdner	Canada	14.7	
4	3	Osman Merican	Singapore	14.8	
5	3	Wayne Athorne	Australia	15.4	

=== Final ===
Wind: 0.0 m/s

Final results
Rank	Name	Nationality	Time	Notes
1st place, gold medalist(s)	David Hemery	England	14.1	
2nd place, silver medalist(s)	Mike Parker	England	14.2	
3rd place, bronze medalist(s)	Ghulam Raziq	Pakistan	14.3	
4	Ray Harvey	Jamaica	14.3	
5	Laurie Taitt	England	14.3	
6	Folu Erinle	Nigeria	14.5	
7	Gurbachan Singh Randhawa	India	14.6	
8	David Prince	Australia	14.6	
