= Jane Finch =

Jane Finch may refer to:

- Jane and Finch, a neighbourhood in Toronto, Canada
- Jane Colebrook (born 1957), British distance runner formerly known as Jane Finch
