= Judith Ayaa =

Ugandan sprinter (1952–2002)

- Ayaa at the 1970 British Commonwealth Games

Personal information
- Nationality: Ugandan
- Born: 15 June 1952 Koch-Goma, Uganda
- Died: 2002 (aged 49–50) Kampala, Uganda
- Height: 174 cm (5 ft 9 in)
- Weight: 55 kg (121 lb)

Sport
- Sport: Sprinting
- Event: 400 metres

Achievements and titles
- Personal best: 52.6 (1972)

Judith Ayaa (15 June 1952 – 2002) was a Ugandan sprinter. After establishing herself as a multiple gold medallist at the East and Central African Championships in several events, Ayaa won a bronze medal in the 400 metres at the 1970 British Commonwealth Games. She was the first Ugandan woman to win a medal at a Commonwealth Games.

== Early life ==
Ayaa was born in Koch-Goma, a settlement in the Nwoya District of Northern Uganda.

== Career ==
=== Early career ===
At the age of 16, Ayaa won gold in the women's 100m race at the 1968 East and Central African Championships in Dar es Salaam, Tanzania with a time of 11.5 seconds. Ayaa began to establish dominance at the championships, winning the 100m, 200m and 400m in the 1969 competition in the capital of Uganda, Kampala. She was also a member of the 4 × 100 m relay team that claimed gold at the event. Her best time in the 400m of 53.6 seconds ranked her among the top 10 athletes in the world at the time for the event. She repeated her sweep at the 1970 championships in Nairobi, Kenya, winning all three of her events.

Later the same year, Ayaa was selected to represent Uganda at the 1970 British Commonwealth Games in the 100m and 400m events. In the 100m, Ayaa finished second in her heat, behind Australian Jenny Lamy. In the semi-finals, she was eliminated after finishing in sixth position. In the 400m event, Ayaa set a new African record for the distance of 52.86 seconds on the way to winning her qualifying race for the semi-final. The time placed her as the 11th fastest woman over 400m in the world for the year. In the 400m semi-finals, she again won her race, finishing more than a second ahead of second placed Australian Sandra Brown. The final was dominated by 17-year old Jamaican Marilyn Neufville who set a new world record with her victory. Ayaa and Brown competed for second place. Having been leading into the final straight, Ayaa slowed significantly which has been attributed to her exertion in winning the semi-final by some distance. Brown overtook Ayaa in a photo finish to claim silver, with Ayaa winning bronze. Her podium finish made her the first Ugandan woman to win a medal at a commonwealth games. Her achievements also led to her being named Sports Woman of the Year by the Uganda Amateur Athletics Association.

In 1971, Ayaa won a 400m gold medal at a USA vs the rest of the world event. Her time of 54.69 second was nearly a second faster than her nearest competitors, Americans Gwendolyn Norman and Jarvis Scott. Later the same year, in the East and Central African Championships, Ayaa claimed another haul of gold medals. She won the 400 m event before adding golds in the 4 × 100 m and 4 × 400 m team events.

=== 1972 Summer Olympics and later career ===
Ayaa was selected for the Uganda delegation for the 1972 Summer Olympics in Munich, West Germany. She was one of only two women in the squad, along with 200m runner Rose Musani. Ayaa finished fourth in her heat after running the race in 52.85 seconds. In the quarter-final, Ayaa was drawn alongside reigning Olympic champion Colette Besson. Ayaa finished third in the race, setting a new African 400m record of 52.68 seconds that was not beaten for more than three decades. Besson failed to qualify after placing fifth. Ayaa's competition ended in the semi-finals when she finished seventh in her race, eliminating her from the Games.

After the Olympics, Ayaa returned to the East and Central African Championships in Dar el Salaam where she won her fourth gold in the 400m event. She also won gold in the 4 × 100 m team event.

== Later life ==
Ayaa drifted away from athletics after 1972, marrying and giving birth to several children in quick succession which ultimately brought an end to her sporting career. She had at least four children, Nancy, Emmanuel, Priscila and Henry. She worked in the Ugandan prison service as a warden during her athletics career and continued the role after retirement.

The economic downturn in Uganda under the regime of Idi Amin pushed Ayaa into poverty and she was forced to beg on the streets of Kampala before earning a living by breaking stones. John Akii-Bua, a teammate of Ayaa's at the 1972 Summer Olympics who won gold in the men's 400m hurdles, discovered Ayaa's plight and raised awareness. Donations were made to support her before she died at Mulago Hospital in Kampala in 2002. A nursery school, named the Ayaa Foundation was set up in her hometown to care for orphans and vulnerable children. In 2014, plans were announced for a statue of Ayaa to be erected in Koch-Goma.

== See also ==
Peruth Chemutai

Dorcus Inzikuru

Jacob Kiplimo
