= Uganda at the 1962 British Empire and Commonwealth Games =

- CGF code: UGA
- CGA: Uganda Olympic Committee
- Website: nocuganda.com

in Perth, Western Australia
- Flag bearers: Opening: Closing:
- Medals Ranked 11thth: Gold 1 Silver 1 Bronze 4 Total 6

British Empire and Commonwealth Games appearances
- 1954; 1958; 1962; 1966; 1970; 1974; 1978; 1982; 1986; 1990; 1994; 1998; 2002; 2006; 2010; 2014; 2018; 2022; 2026; 2030

Uganda competed at the 1962 British Empire and Commonwealth Games in Perth, Western Australia, from 22 November to 1 December 1962.

== Medalists ==
Medal	Name	Sport	Event	Date
Bronze	Benson Ishiepai	Athletics	Men's 440 yards hurdles	26 November
Bronze	Amos Omolo	Athletics	Men's 440 yards	29 November

== Athletics ==
Men
Track & road events

Athlete	Event	Round 1		Round 2		Semifinal		Final	
Athlete	Event	Result	Rank	Result	Rank	Result	Rank	Result	Rank
James Odongo Oduka	100 yd	9.9	4 Q	10.3	5	did not advance			
James Odongo Oduka	220 yd	22.6	4 Q	22.5	5	did not advance			
Amos Omolo	440 yd	47.1	1 Q	—N/a		46.9	2 Q	46.8	3rd place, bronze medalist(s)
Amos Omolo	440 yd	48.5	3	—N/a		did not advance			
Robert Rwakojo	1 mile	4:11.1	6	—N/a		did not advance			
Charles Eswau	120 yd hurdles	15.0	4 Q	—N/a				did not advance	
Benson Ishiepai	120 yd hurdles	DNS		—N/a				did not advance	
Benson Ishiepai	440 yd hurdles	52.0	1 Q	—N/a				52.3	3rd place, bronze medalist(s)
Jerome Ochana	440 yd hurdles	DNF		—N/a				did not advance	
Ludovico Amukun	3000 m steeplechase	—N/a						9:32.0	9
Vinancio Okwera	Marathon	—N/a						DNF	
Deogatius Rwabugwene	Marathon	—N/a						2:42:28	11
George Zebukire	Marathon	—N/a						DNF	

Field events

Athlete	Event	Final	
Athlete	Event	Distance	Rank
Patrick Etolu	High jump	6 ft 6 in (1.98 m)	9
William Kamanyi	Long jump	23 ft 11 1/2 in (7.30 m)	10
Sev Obura	Long jump	23 ft 9 1/4 in (7.25 m)	11
Lawrence Ogwang	Triple jump	48 ft 9 in (14.86 m)	9
Yovan Ochola	Shot put	50 ft 5 in (15.37 m)	8

== See also ==
- Uganda at the 1960 Summer Olympics
- Uganda at the 1964 Summer Olympics
