= Ghulam Raziq =

Pakistani hurdler (1932–1989)

Personal information
- Nationality: Pakistani
- Born: 11 November 1932 Nathot, Punjab, British Raj
- Died: 24 June 1989 (aged 56) Rawalpindi, Punjab, Pakistan
- Height: 183 cm (6 ft 0 in)
- Weight: 72 kg (159 lb)

Sport
- Sport: Athletics
- Event: Hurdling
Medal record
Men's Athletics
Representing Pakistan
Event	1st	2nd	3rd
Asian Games	2	1	1
Commonwealth Games	1	–	2
Total	3	1	3
Commonwealth Games
Gold medal – first place	1962 Perth	120 yards hurdles
Bronze medal – third place	1966 Kingston	120 yards hurdles
Bronze medal – third place	1958 Cardiff	120 yards hurdles
Asian Games
Gold medal – first place	1958 Tokyo	110 m hurdles
Gold medal – first place	1966 Bangkok	110 m hurdles
Silver medal – second place	1962 Jakarta	110 m hurdles
Bronze medal – third place	1958 Tokyo	4 × 110 m relay

Ghulam Raziq (11 November 1932 – 24 June 1989) was a Pakistani hurdler who competed at the 1956, 1960, and the 1964 Summer Olympics.

== Career ==
Ghulam Raziq was born on 11 November 1932 in Jhelum District, British India. In the Asian Games, Raziq won the gold medal in 1958 and 1966, and a silver in 1962.

Raziq won the British AAA Championships title in the 120 yards hurdles event at the 1960 AAA Championships.

At the Commonwealth Games, Raziq won medals three successive times. He first secured a bronze medal in 1958 in Cardiff, followed by gold in 1962 in Perth. He again secured bronze medal in 1966 in Kingston.

At the Olympics, Raziq made it to the semi-finals in 1956 and 1960 Summer Olympics in Rome. In 1960, he was involved in a photo finish for the third place in his semi-final round, and missed out on a finals place by a whisker.

== Personal life ==
Raziq hailed from Domeli in the Jhelum district. Like several athletes in Pakistan's early history, Raziq was a soldier in the Pakistan Army. He also participated in the World Military Games.

== Awards and recognition ==
Ribbon	Decoration	Country	Year
	Pride of Performance	Pakistan	1964

Ghulam Raziq was awarded the Pride of Performance Award in 1964 in recognition of his outstanding achievements and contributions to athletics.

== Death ==
Ghulam Raziq died on 24 June 1989 in Rawalpindi, Punjab, Pakistan.

== See also ==
- List of Pakistani records in athletics
- Athletics in Pakistan
- Pakistan at the Olympics
