= Chris Commons =

Kris or Chris Commons may refer to:

- Chris Commons (basketball) (born 1984), American professional basketball player
- Chris Commons (long jumper) (born 1950), Australian long jumper
- Kris Commons (born 1983), Scottish professional footballer
