= Caistor Yarborough Academy =

Location
- Grimsby Road; Caistor, Lincolnshire, LN7 6QZ; England
- Coordinates: 53.4977°N 0.31042°W

Information
- Type: Academy
- Motto: "Value, Respect, Achieve"
- Established: 1938
- Department for Education URN: 136958 Tables
- Ofsted: Reports
- Chair of Governors: Trevor Wray
- Principal: Mark Midgley
- Gender: Co-educational
- Age: 11 to 16
- Enrolment: 560 (Self-imposed limit)
- Houses: Tennyson; Newton; Jennings
- Colours: Green, Gold, Black
- Website: http://www.caistoryarboroughacademy.org.uk/

Caistor Yarborough Academy is a mixed 11–16 yrs secondary school based in the Lincolnshire market town of Caistor, England. The school was founded as Caistor Yarborough School on 18 October 1938, and celebrated its 75th anniversary in 2013. The school serves a large area of rural Lincolnshire, with a number of pupils travelling from outside the local area to attend the school, including pupils from Grimsby and Scunthorpe. It performs consistently well at GCSE.

== About the school ==
=== Location ===
The academy occupies a hilltop site on the edge of the town of Caistor. Featuring predominantly Georgian architecture, Caistor was established as a Roman fortress, due to its excellent strategic position on the North Western edge of the Lincolnshire Wolds, and a number of ancient freshwater springs, which would have been the primary water source for the settlement. Now recognised as a valuable historical site, Caistor has numerous listed buildings and two scheduled monuments, one being the original Roman walls.

The academy is on the eastern edge of the town and the main access is from Grimsby Road (A1084) to the North of the site, with the A46 Caistor Bypass forming the Southern boundary of the site. The nearest major towns and cities include Grimsby, approximately 11 miles northeast of Caistor; Scunthorpe, 17 miles to the northwest; Louth, 19 miles to the southeast and the City of Lincoln, which lies approximately 24 miles southwest of the town.

=== History ===
Caistor Secondary Modern School was built in 1938. The school was officially opened by Charles Duncombe, 3rd Earl of Feversham, who returned twenty one years later, to present awards at a speech night. Also present in October 1959 was the Earl of Yarborough, and John Birkbeck, the director of education of Lindsey. On Thursday 23 November 1950, the headmaster since 1938, Mr Norman Graham Collins, died in Scunthorpe War Memorial Hospital, in his mid-40s.

In March 1951 Ernest Urry, a geography teacher at Brigg Grammar School, was appointed headteacher. He had attended Brigg Grammar School and St Edmund Hall, Oxford, and began his position in April 1951; he served in the RAF as a Flt Lt in World War II. Olga May Urry, his wife, from Scunthorpe, died aged 35 on 31 December 1951 in Scunthorpe War Memorial Hospital.

Buildings were added in the mid-1950s, as part of a joint construction contract, with work on the nearby grammar school. In April 1956 Mr Urry was appointed as the first headmaster of Brigg Redcombe-road Secondary Modern School, which opened in January 1957 as Glanford Secondary School. Ernest Urry died in August 1990, aged 82. 44-year-old Charles E Hallett, the deputy headmaster at Spilsby Secondary Modern School, was appointed as the new headteacher in May 1956; he had attended the Wintringham Grammar School in Grimsby.

After nineteen years, the school was renamed Yarborough Modern School in September 1957, named after John Edward Pelham, the 7th Earl of Yarborough. In the early 1960s the school buildings had to be improved again, according to the School Premises Regulations. By the mid-1960s it was called the Caistor Yarborough Secondary School.

There were comprehensive school proposals in January 1967, whereby the school would be a four-form entry comprehensive school, and the grammar would be a sixth form and a boarding house. In September 1967, the prizes were given out by John Barnett, the chief constable of Lincolnshire Police. The Lindsey Director of Education, Mr George Venables Cooke, handed out prizes in October 1969, and warned against 'hippies'. He said that a lot of natural discipline had disappeared, and the 'workshy' could live off the welfare state, without the need to work. He said that in 1969 there was a threat to the country that was subtle. Mr Cooke, appointed aged 45 in January 1965, had attended Sandbach School, and had read Modern History at Lincoln College, Oxford, previously being the deputy director of education for Sheffield.

A new £180,000 teaching block opened in October 1974 with eleven classrooms, and two practical rooms. The headteacher Charles Hallett retired in December 1974; he died in January 1988 aged 76, in Louth County Hospital.

In 1974, under new headteacher Mr K Haye, there were brief discussions about making the school from ages 11–18, and closing the nearby grammar school, but the grammar school was largely too broadly revered for that to be much of a possibility. The Gainsborough and Sturton areas were also being discussed. By 1976, if there was to be a comprehensive, Lincolnshire council would only want one, on one site, which would mean closing one of the schools, which no-one much wanted to do. This remaining difficulty would keep the selective system in Caistor.

On Thursday 19 October 1978 the campaigner, Mary Whitehouse, spoke to the school PTA in Caistor Town Hall, and about how her campaign against vulgar broadcasting began in 1962, when she was a teacher. She said that over the last 20 years there had been a 'total attack' on faith, culture, standards and tradition. She said that crime rose from 1956, when television increased, and that people asked her why there were 'crazy dreadful people' on television. She visited Caistor as the former Lincolnshire chief constable, John Barnett, compiled, for her, a report on TV violence on children. She sent the report to the BBC, who took no notice. He became the first chairman of her campaigning organisation.

Comprehensive education in Caistor was discussed in early 1980, but parents were now beginning to move to the area from further to the north (the new county of Humberside), merely for the type of school found in Caistor, which would not strengthen the case for a comprehensive school, and discussed in 1984, with the possibility of closing both schools and sending all 700 to Market Rasen, or to have one comprehensive school, to be decided in January 1985. The Caistor Comprehensive Campaign was headed by Dr Chris Allison, who favoured closing both schools, and sending most children to Market Rasen. But most teachers in Market Rasen felt that would be too much of an unworkable change. The Education for Caistor Campaign favoured more cooperation, but to keep both schools. It was decided in January 1985 to retain both schools in the same form, but with more shared resources. A possible plan had been to send Caistor sixth formers to Market Rasen. In March 1985 there was a plan for a sixth form at the school. The headmaster in 1985 was Barry Tointon. A new system, between the two schools, was introduced in September 1986.

O-level results were improving in the 1980s, with two gaining 10 O-levels, and nine gaining 5 or more, in 1986. At the same time, Grimsby's comprehensive schools were not achieving, resulting in most losing their sixth forms in 1990.

The school became grant maintained in 1992, and the school was now over-subscribed. Comprehensive schools in nearby Grimsby were often unappealing to parents, with known discipline difficulties, and Caistor was seen as a much safer bet, being a smaller school, and in a charming rural town. A good position in the local school league tables, published from 1992, would attract many parents from the Grimsby area. Towards the end of the 1990s the school steamed ahead in its GCSE results, mostly thanks to parents choosing the school over local comprehensives; teachers were also attracted to the school, from Grimsby.

It became an academy in 2011 and changed its name to Caistor Yarborough Academy. It is sited near the border of the Brocklesby House estate, the Yarborough family seat, and the landmark Pelham's Pillar is situated a mile to the north of the Academy. The Pillar is in the grounds of the Brocklesby estate and is an observation tower built as a memorial to Charles Anderson-Pelham, 1st Earl of Yarborough.

=== Creative arts ===
In September 2006, Caistor Yarborough was designated a specialist Arts College, as part of the (now defunct) Specialist Schools Programme, which was established in England in 1995. As part of the schools new status, a Creative Arts facility was built on the school site at a cost of over £1,500,000. The facilities were opened on 17 October 2007, by John Godber, a renowned English playwright and Artistic Director of Hull Truck Theatre Company. The new facility houses purpose built studios for dance, music and drama, with a recording studio and other state of the art equipment. For a number of years, the school was also the holder of the Artsmark award from Arts Council England, achieving Gold level in 2007. The award was in recognition of the high level of arts provision in the school curriculum.

== Facilities ==
Today the Academy has a variety of buildings of different ages including some temporary facilities, due to ongoing development of the site in to ensure that it meets the requirements of a modern educational establishment.

Like many schools of the era, the original building was constructed around a small quadrangle, with the main hall to the east side and classrooms built around the other three sides. This building still exists, housing mainly technology workshops. The 'old school', as it is known, also houses the main entrance, school office, and information technology rooms. On a clear day, Lincoln Cathedral, approximately 24 miles southwest of the town, can clearly be seen in the distance from various points around the school site.

=== Site developments ===
The first major development of the site, was the construction of a two-storey classroom block for English and Mathematics, and a single storey block of purpose built labs for Science.

Later, in 1996, another two-storey teaching block was constructed, housing classrooms for Religious Studies, History, Geography and Modern Foreign Languages. This new building was attached to the existing English & Maths block and the layouts of some of the existing rooms were changed to provide direct access between the two buildings on both floors. The school library was relocated to a mobile classroom which was no longer needed after the new block was built and an IT suite was installed in its place. The new facility was officially opened in 1998 by Charles Pelham, the current Earl of Yarborough.

Caistor Sports Hall, a new £609,000 purpose-built sports centre was constructed from March 1995 by TopCon, which opened on 25 April 1996; now grant-maintained, the school could start to choose how any funding was divided, and not dictated by the local council. The Sports Council of Great Britain had donated £70,000, and help from the Foundation for Sport and the Arts. A sports development officer was funded by the district and county councils. The building houses a fully equipped, multi-purpose sports hall, a weights room, changing rooms, showers, offices, lockers and vending machines. When it was built, it was intended that the sports hall would double as a community sports venue, to ensure financial sustainability for the school. A Sports Development Officer was appointed to schedule an ongoing programme of out of hours community events and bookings, however financial losses estimated at £10,000 per year forced the school to consider closing the facility to the public, as it would have been illegal for the school to subsidise these losses using its own funds. Following a campaign to retain community use of the facility, West Lindsey District Council agreed to manage the building on the school's behalf, commencing 1 April 2006. The council now work in partnership with the school to ensure that the building operates profitable outside of school hours and it is run as a satellite from the De Aston Sports Hall, which is also a shared school/community facility based at the De Aston School in Market Rasen.

Following the construction of the new creative arts facility at the school in 2006, various changes were made to the site. The new building was constructed on the former staff car park, which was relocated. As the facility houses a canteen, this replaced the existing building, which was demolished along with other buildings also left redundant as a result of the build. These buildings had been grouped together next to the schools main driveway, so a new parking area was built in their place, designed to ease the ongoing problem of congestion caused by lack of space for school buses in the driveways. As well as being a creative arts facility for the school, the new building also houses facilities which double as a youth centre for the local community outside of school hours.

== Curriculum ==
Caistor Yarborough follows the National Curriculum of England at Key Stage 3 and Key Stage 4, with the ultimate goal of all students achieving GCSE passes. The arts college status of the school permits the provision of supplementary qualifications including:

- BTEC First Certificate, Acting
- BTEC First Certificate, Dance
- BTEC First Certificate, Music

== Notable former pupils ==
=== Yarborough School ===
- Jane Colebrook (born 1957), and her sister Teena (born 1956), 800m runner, came third in the 800m at the 1978 Commonwealth Games in Canada; Teena took part in the 1500 metres

== Sources ==
- Market Rasen Mail - "Sports hall future secured"
- Listed Buildings in Caistor, Lincolnshire
- Key dates in Caistor's History, showing the year that the school was established
