= Abdullah Noor Wasughe =

Somali former high jumper (born 1947)

Abdullah Noor Wasughe (born 13 December 1947) is a Somali former high jumper who competed in the 1972 Summer Olympics. He also won the 1970, 1971 and 1972 East and Central African Championships and the 1973 All-Africa Games.

His personal best jump was 5.05 metres, achieved in 1972.
