= Jane Colebrook =

British middle-distance runner

Personal information
- Nationality: British (English)
- Born: 8 November 1957 (age 68)

Sport
- Sport: Athletics
- Event: middle-distance
- Club: Cannock Chase
Medal record
Representing Great Britain
Women's Athletics
World Indoor Games
| Silver medal – second place | 1985 Paris | 800 m |
European Indoor Championships
| Gold medal – first place | 1977 San Sebastián | 800 m |
Representing England
Commonwealth Games
| Bronze medal – third place | 1978 Edmonton | 800 m |

Katrina Jane Weston (née Colebrook, formerly Finch; born 8 November 1957) is a former British middle-distance runner who specialised in the 800 metres. Competing as Jane Colebrook, she equalled the world indoor best to win at the 1977 European Indoor Championships and won a bronze medal at the 1978 Commonwealth Games. Competing as Jane Finch, she won a silver medal at the 1985 World Indoor Games.

== Early life ==
Born Jane Colebrook in Lincolnshire, she started out as a sprinter and won the under-15s 200 metres race at the 1972 AAAs Junior Championships, with her sister Teena, at Yarborough School in Caistor, living in Nettleton.

== Career ==
She stepped up to longer distances over the next two years, winning both indoor and outdoor under-17s title in the 400 metres and 800 metres. She was the winner of the intermediate 800 m race at the 1974 English Schools Championships. In December 1976 she ran a British indoor junior record of 2:05.0 minutes for the 800 m (later bettered by Kirsty Wade in 1981).

She had her greatest achievement at the 1977 European Athletics Indoor Championships at the age of nineteen, where after qualifying for the final as one of the fastest losers she went on to beat Totka Petrova to win the 800 m gold medal with a world indoor record-equalling time of 2:01.1 minutes. This time was a British indoor record for 26 years, becoming the longest-standing British record at one point, and was improved upon by Kelly Holmes in 2003. It remains the fastest ever time by a female British under-23 runner. That July, she ran her lifetime best for the 800 m outdoors in Oulu, Finland, clocking a time of 2:00.6 minutes, which made her the second best British performer in the event at that point, behind Rosemary Stirling. Colebrook also won the women's title at the North of England Cross Country Championships that year.

She won a 400/800 m double at the UK Athletics Championships in 1978. Colebrook went on to represent England in the latter event at the 1978 Commonwealth Games and won the bronze medal behind Judy Peckham and Tekla Chemabwai.

When married, she moved to Aylesby in the 1980s, and ran for Cannock Chase, where she trained every Tuesday. She ran 23 miles each week in the summer, and 30 miles in the winter.

She won the final major medal of her career at the 1985 IAAF World Indoor Games, where she took the 800 m silver medal behind the Romanian Olympic medallist Cristieana Cojocaru. She brought her professional career to a close in order to focus on her family and raising her three children. She returned to competition as a masters athlete and won the over-35s 1500 metres title at the European Veterans Indoor Championships.

In her later career she was known under her married name Finch. She was later divorced, competing as Jane Colebrook again, and then remarried and ran as Jane Weston. She was coached by Dave Sunderland. Her sister, Teena Colebrook, was also a runner and won seven NCAA Division II titles in middle distance events for California Polytechnic State University.

== International competitions ==
| Year | Competition | Venue | Position | Event | Notes |
Representing Great Britain / England
| 1977 | European Indoor Championships | San Sebastián, Spain | 1st | 800 m | 2:01.12 |
| 1978 | Commonwealth Games | Edmonton, Canada | 3rd | 800 m | 2:03.10 |
| 1983 | European Indoor Championships | Budapest, Hungary | 6th | 800 m | 2:03.21 |
| 1985 | World Indoor Games | Paris, France | 2nd | 800 m | 2:04.71 |

== Personal life ==
She married Terry Finch of Healing, in August 1979 at Caistor register office.

Her older sister Teena had moved to Deeping St James by 1983. Her sister Teena (born October 1956) was a P E instructor for eight years in the WRAF until 1981, with her last three years at RAF Wittering, in 1980, training at St Athan in 1975 Teena represented the UK in the 1500 metres in the 1990 European Championships.
