= Ian Campbell (triple jumper) =

Australian triple jumper

Ian Bernard Campbell (born 18 April 1957 in Victoria) is a retired long and triple jumper from Australia. He is best known for being "fouled" multiple times during the 1980 Moscow Olympics, under controversial circumstances.

== 1980 Olympics ==
Campbell represented Australia in the triple jump at the 1980 Summer Olympics in Moscow, USSR. There he finished in fifth place, with a leap of 16.72 metres (54 ft 10 in). In the final, Campbell, missed a likely gold medal after his fourth jump was fouled; this decision has been disputed since. He was accused of dragging his trail leg during the second, or "step" portion of the event. He had several jumps over 17.37 metres and at least one estimated to be just under 17.60 metres (the Olympic record was 17.39, and the winning jump in 1980 was 17.35), but after each of those jumps, and sometimes with a few seconds' hesitation, a judge's red flag indicated a foul.

In 2015, Athletics Australia submitted a request to the IAAF to award Campbell a gold medal for the 1980 triple jump, claiming that video recordings of the disputed fourth jump clearly show that the foul decision was erroneous. A similar request was submitted for the women's 200 metres sprint at the 1948 Olympics, claiming that Shirley Strickland should posthumously be awarded the bronze medal.

== Other athletics achievements ==
Competing for the Washington State Cougars track and field team, Campbell won the 1977 and 1978 triple jump at the NCAA Division I Indoor Track and Field Championships, jumping 16.97 m at the 1978 edition.

He also won the silver medal at the 1978 Commonwealth Games with 16.93 and was third in 1979 IAAF World Cup with 16.76. His personal best result was 17.09.

== Later career ==
In 2003, he was appointed CEO of the Richmond Football Club.
