= Michael Ryan (hurdler) =

Australian hurdler (1941–2017)

Personal information
- Nationality: Australian
- Born: 19 December 1941
- Died: 7 November 2017 (aged 75)

Sport
- Sport: Track and field
- Event: 400 metres hurdles

Michael Ryan (19 December 1941 – 7 November 2017) was an Australian hurdler. He competed in the men's 400 metres hurdles at the 1964 Summer Olympics.
