= Athletics at the 1978 Commonwealth Games – Men's triple jump =

Men's triple jump at the Commonwealth Games

The men's triple jump event at the 1978 Commonwealth Games was held on 11 and 12 August at the Commonwealth Stadium in Edmonton, Alberta, Canada.

== Medalists ==
Gold	Silver	Bronze
Keith Connor; England	Ian Campbell; Australia	Aston Moore; England

== Results ==
=== Qualification ===
Held on 11 August

Qualification: 15.50 m (Q) or at least 12 best (q) qualified for the final.

Rank	Name	Nationality	Result	Notes
	Ian Campbell	Australia	16.56	Q
	Ken Lorraway	Australia	15.63	Q
14	Bogger Mushanga	Zambia	15.45	
15	Ronald Chambers	Jamaica	15.44	
	James Malleh Wadda	Gambia	NM	
	Suresh Babu	India	DNS	

=== Final ===
Held on 12 August

Rank	Name	Nationality	Result	Notes
1st place, gold medalist(s)	Keith Connor	England	17.21w	
2nd place, silver medalist(s)	Ian Campbell	Australia	16.93w	
3rd place, bronze medalist(s)	Aston Moore	England	16.69	
4	Ken Lorraway	Australia	16.27	
5	Mike Nipinak	Canada	16.24	
6	Phil Wood	New Zealand	16.05	
7	Steve Hanna	Bahamas	15.97	
8	David Johnson	England	15.84	
9	John Phillips	Wales	15.59	
10	Dave Watt	Canada	15.29	
11	Gideon Cheruiyot	Kenya	15.28	
12	Gerry Swan	Bermuda	15.06	
13	Maxwell Peters	Antigua and Barbuda	15.06	
