= Athletics at the 1974 British Commonwealth Games – Men's long jump =

Men's long jump at the 1974 British Commonwealth Games
- Venue: Queen Elizabeth II Park
- Dates: 27 and 29 January

Medalists
gold medal	Alan Lerwill	England
silver medal	Chris Commons	Australia
bronze medal	Joshua Owusu	Ghana

The men's long jump event at the 1974 British Commonwealth Games was held on 27 and 29 January at the Queen Elizabeth II Park in Christchurch, New Zealand.

== Medallists ==
Medal winners
Gold	Silver	Bronze
Alan Lerwill; England	Chris Commons; Australia	Joshua Owusu; Ghana

== Results ==
=== Qualification ===
Held on 27 January.

Qualification result
Rank	Name	Nationality	Distance	Notes
	Bruce Field	Australia	7.73	
	Chris Commons	Australia	7.65	
	Tony Moore	Fiji	7.65	
	Murray Tolbert	Australia	7.46	
13	Johnson Mogusu	Kenya	7.15	
14	Yesaya Mhango	Malawi	7.13	
15	Charles Lupiya	Zambia	7.12	
16	Alfred Ogunfeyimi	Nigeria	7.10	
17	William Clark	Scotland	7.07	
18	Sakaraia Tuva	Fiji	5.97	
	Kenneth Atkins	Scotland	NM	
	Johnson Amoah	Ghana	DNS	

=== Final ===
Held on 29 January.

Final result
Rank	Name	Nationality	Result	Notes
1st place, gold medalist(s)	Alan Lerwill	England	7.94	
2nd place, silver medalist(s)	Chris Commons	Australia	7.92	
3rd place, bronze medalist(s)	Joshua Owusu	Ghana	7.75	
4	Kingsley Adams	Ghana	7.68	
5	Bruce Field	Australia	7.63	
6	John Okoro	Nigeria	7.58	
7	Fidelis Ndyabagye	Uganda	7.50	
8	Murray Tolbert	Australia	7.42	
9	Tuariki Delamere	New Zealand	7.31	
10	Kerry Hill	New Zealand	7.18	
11	William Kirkpatrick	Northern Ireland	6.90	
	Tony Moore	Fiji	NM	
