= Laurie Taitt =

British sprint hurdler (1934–2006)

Personal information
- Nationality: British/Guyanan
- Born: 28 March 1934 Georgetown, Demerara-Mahaica, British Guiana
- Died: 18 October 2006 (aged 72) Croydon, Greater London, England
- Height: 5 ft 11 in (1.80 m)
- Weight: 163 lb (74 kg)

Sport
- Sport: Athletics
- Event: Hurdles
- Club: Herne Hill Harriers
Medal record
Men's athletics
Representing England
British Empire and Commonwealth Games
Bronze medal – third place	1962 Perth	120 yd hurdles

John Lawrence Taitt (28 March 1934 – 18 October 2006) was a British sprint hurdler. He was born in Georgetown, Demerara-Mahaica, British Guiana (present day Guyana) and competed at the 1964 Summer Olympics.

== Biography ==
Taitt first competed internationally at the 1958 British Empire and Commonwealth Games in Cardiff, Wales. Representing British Guiana, he reached the semi-finals of the 120 yards hurdles.

Four years later, now representing Great Britain, Taitt reached the semi-finals of the 110 metres hurdles at the 1962 European Athletics Championships in Belgrade, Yugoslavia. Two months later representing England, Taitt won the bronze medal in the 120 yards hurdles at the 1962 British Empire and Commonwealth Games in Perth, Western Australia in a time of 14.7 seconds. He was also due to compete in the high jump but pulled out to focus on the hurdles.

Taitt won his first of two British AAA Championships titles at the 1963 AAA Championships (his second would come two years later at the 1965 AAA Championships).

At the 1964 Summer Olympics in Tokyo, Taitt in the 110 metres hurdles finished fourth in his heat after crossing the line in 14.5 seconds. This was not enough for him to advance to the semi-finals. Two years later at the 1966 British Empire and Commonwealth Games in Kingston, Jamaica, Taitt finished fifth in the final of the 120 yards hurdles in a time of 14.3 seconds. At his final major meet, the 1966 European Athletics Championships in Budapest, Hungary, Taitt was unable to make the final of the 110 metres hurdles.

Taitt died on 18 October 2006 in Croydon, Greater London, at the age of 72.
