= Giorgio Frinolli =

Italian hurdler (born 1970)

Giorgio Frinolii
Personal information
- Full name: Giorgio Frinolli Puzzilli
- Nationality: Italian
- Born: 12 July 1970 (age 56) Rome, Italy
- Height: 1.80 m (5 ft 11 in)
- Weight: 70 kg (154 lb)

Sport
- Country: Italy
- Sport: Athletics
- Event: 400 metres hurdles
- Club: G.S. Fiamme Azzurre

Achievements and titles
- Personal best: 400 m hs: 49.04 (2001)
Medal record
Mediterranean Games
Silver medal – second place	1993 Narbonne	400 metres

Giorgio "Tito" Frinolii (born 12 July 1970) is a former Italian hurdler. He is the son of the 1966 European champion, Roberto Frinolli, and the coach of the Italian sprinter Jessica Paoletta.

== Biography ==
He won one medal, at senior level, at the International athletics competitions. He competed for Italy in the 400 metres hurdles at the 2000 Summer Olympics. He has 22 caps in the national team from 1993 to 2001.

== Achievements ==
Year	Competition	Venue	Position	Event	Notes
Representing Italy
1994	European Championships	Helsinki, Finland	32nd (h)	400m hurdles	51.16
2000	Olympic Games	Sydney, Australia	SF	400 metres hurdles	50.10

== National titles ==
Giorgio Frinolli has won 3 times consecutively the individual national championship.

- 3 wins in the 400 metres hurdles (1993, 1994, 2000)

== See also ==
- Italian all-time top lists - 400 metres hurdles
