= Billy Hardin =

American retired track and field athlete (born 1942)

William Foster Hardin (born January 13, 1942, in Shreveport, Louisiana) is an American retired track and field athlete. He represented the United States at the 1964 Olympics in the 400 meters hurdles. He is the son of 1936 Olympic champion Glenn Hardin. Like his father, he ran for the LSU Tigers and won the NCAA championship in the 400 hurdles 30 years after his father repeated in the 440 yard dash. He was also the USA champion at 400 meters hurdles that year, duplicating a championship his father won three times. He finished second to Rex Cawley at the 1964 Olympic Trials as Cawley set the world record. Video on YouTube @:40 In the Olympics, he was the fastest of the first round, but finished in a non-qualifying sixth in his semi-final. Cawley went on to win the gold medal.
