= Keiki Iijima =

Japanese hurdler (born 1938)

Personal information
- Nationality: Japanese
- Born: 16 May 1938 (age 88) Tokyo, Japan

Sport
- Sport: Track and field
- Event: 400 metres hurdles
Medal record
Representing Japan
Asian Games
Silver medal – second place	1962 Jakarta	400m hurdles
Bronze medal – third place	1962 Jakarta	4x400m relay

Keiki Iijima (Japanese: 飯島 恵喜, Hepburn: Iijima Keiki; born 16 May 1938) is a Japanese hurdler. He competed in the men's 400 metres hurdles at the 1964 Summer Olympics.
