= Seraphina Nyauma =

Kenyan javelin thrower (born 1965)

Medal record

Women's athletics

Representing Kenya

African Championships
| Gold medal – first place | 1990 Cairo | Javelin throw |
| Gold medal – first place | 1992 Belle Vue Harel | Javelin throw |

Seraphina Nyauma (born 1965) is a retired Kenyan javelin thrower.

She won the gold medal at the 1983 East and Central African Championships, the silver medal at the 1987 All-Africa Games, the gold medal at the 1990 African Championships, the gold medal at the 1991 All-Africa Games and the gold medal at the 1992 African Championships and finished eighth at the 1992 IAAF World Cup.
