= Peter Warden =

British athlete

Personal information
- Nationality: British (English)
- Born: 7 July 1941 (age 85)
- Height: 5 ft (152 cm) 6.5"
- Weight: 128 lb (58 kg)

Sport
- Sport: Track and field
- Event: 400 metres hurdles
- College team: Loughbrough University
- Club: Airedale Harriers - Athlete Preston Harriers - Coach

Achievements and titles
- Personal bests: 400 Hurdles - 50.68; 400 meters - 46.9
Medal record
Athletics
Representing England
British Empire & Commonwealth Games
Bronze medal – third place	1966 Kingston	440y hurdles
Bronze medal – third place	1966 Kingston	440y relay

Peter Warden BEM (born 7 July 1941) is a British hurdler and former National Coach.

== Biography ==
Warden finished second behind John Cooper in the 440 yards hurdles event at the 1964 AAA Championships.

Later that year, Warden competed in the men's 400 metres hurdles at the 1964 Summer Olympics. Warden, Mike Hogan and the eventual silver medalist John Cooper were the only British men to contest the event. Warden progressed to the semi-final after placing third in his heat with a time of 51.6 seconds. He missed out on a place in the Olympic final by just two hundredths of a second after placing fifth in his semi-final behind the gold medalist Rex Cawley.

Representing England, Warden won a bronze medal in the 440 yard hurdles and the 4 x 440 yards relay at the 1966 British Empire and Commonwealth Games. In this individual race 'Little Peter Warden' as he was dubbed by the commentator, hits the first hurdle and flicks grit from the cinder track into his eye, but continues racing and pulls out a staggering finish. The English relay team consisted of Martin Winbolt-Lewis, John Adey and Timothy Graham, with Warden running the third leg. The team were drawn in lane 4 with the favourites, Trinidad and Tabago on their outside in lane 8. The team finished a fantastic third and gained England another medal and contributing to their total of 80 medals at these Games.

Warden finished on the podium again at the 1966 AAA Championships and 1967 AAA Championships. Also in 1967, Warden competed at the Kenya AAA's Championships (known as the 'Three As') and finished third despite the oxygen deprivation caused by competing at 1,795m above sea-level. In the report by British Pathé, Warden and the British athletes had to be given pure oxygen after their races due to the impact of the altitude on their bodies.

He is currently listed as 66th on the British All-Time list for the 400 meter hurdles

Under the British Athletics Federation (later became UK Athletics) Warden was made National Coach for the North West and was later made National Jumps Coach. In this position he coached many athletes including Max Robertson and was team manager at several Olympiads. However, in 1997 when the British Athletics Federation collapsed Warden, along with 8 other National Coaches including Bruce Longden who was instrumental in the career of Sally Gunnell, were made redundant.

In 2012 Peter carried the Olympic torch during the torch relay for the 2012 London Summer Olympics and was awarded the British Empire Medal (BEM) in the 2021 New Year Honours for services to athletics in North West England.

== Publications ==
Publications include 'Sprinting and Hurdling (The Skills of the Game)'.
