= Athletics at the 1978 Commonwealth Games – Men's long jump =

Men's long jump at the Commonwealth Games

The men's long jump event at the 1978 Commonwealth Games was held on 8 and 10 August at the Commonwealth Stadium in Edmonton, Alberta, Canada.

== Medalists ==
Gold	Silver	Bronze
Roy Mitchell; England	Chris Commons; Australia	Suresh Babu; India

== Results ==
=== Qualification ===
Held on 8 August

Rank	Name	Nationality	Result	Notes
	Chris Commons	Australia	7.81w	q
	Ken Lorraway	Australia	7.35	q
	Elijah Mbaabu	Kenya	7.25	q
13	Steve Hanna	Bahamas	7.22	
14	Barry Boyd	Canada	7.17	
15	Ronald Chambers	Jamaica	6.86	
16	Emmanuel Mbogo	Tanzania	6.85	
17	James Malleh Wadda	Gambia	6.54	

=== Final ===
Held on 10 August

Rank	Name	Nationality	Result	Notes
1st place, gold medalist(s)	Roy Mitchell	England	8.06w	
2nd place, silver medalist(s)	Chris Commons	Australia	8.04w	
3rd place, bronze medalist(s)	Suresh Babu	India	7.94w	
4	Dennis Trott	Bermuda	7.89	
5	Richard Rock	Canada	7.85	
6	Emmanuel Mifetu	Ghana	7.82	
7	Bogger Mushanga	Zambia	7.68	
8	Ken Lorraway	Australia	7.57w	
9	William Kirkpatrick	Northern Ireland	7.53	
10	Jim McAndrew	Canada	7.48	
11	Ravi Kumara	India	7.41	
	Elijah Mbaabu	Kenya	DNS	
