= Logan Aikman =

New Zealand athlete

Personal information
- Full name: Logan Ross Aikman

Sport
- Country: New Zealand
- Sport: Track and field
- Event: Hurdles

Achievements and titles
- National finals: 120 yards hurdles champion (1964)

Logan Ross Aikman is a former New Zealand athletics representative in the hurdles. He represented his country at the 1962 British Empire and Commonwealth Games in Perth in the 120 and 440 yards hurdles, but did not progress beyond the heats in either event. In 1964, representing Waikato, Aikman won the 120 yards hurdles title, at the New Zealand national athletics championships, with a winning time of 14.5 seconds.
