= Ferdinand Haas =

German hurdler

Personal information
- Nationality: German
- Born: 12 January 1940 (age 86)

Sport
- Sport: Track and field
- Event: 400 metres hurdles

Ferdinand Haas (born 12 January 1940) is a German hurdler. He competed in the men's 400 metres hurdles at the 1964 Summer Olympics.
