= Bogger Mushanga =

Zambian athlete

Personal information
- Nationality: Zambian
- Born: 6 June 1952 (age 74)

Sport
- Sport: Athletics
- Event: Triple jump
Medal record
Men's athletics
Representing Zambia
East and Central African Championships
Gold medal – first place	1975 Mombasa	Long jump
Silver medal – second place	1976 Zanzibar	Long jump
Gold medal – first place	1979 Mombasa	Triple jump
Bronze medal – third place	1979 Mombasa	Long jump

Bogger Mushanga (born 6 June 1952) is a Zambian long and triple jumper. He was a two-time East and Central African Championships gold medallist, was a finalist at the 1978 Commonwealth Games, and competed at the 1980 Summer Olympics. He was called the best long and triple jumper in Zambian history.

== Career ==
Mushanga won two gold medals at the East and Central African Championships, beginning in 1975. At that year's edition in Mombasa, Kenya, he won a long jump gold medal.

Mushanga also won a silver medal at the 1976 East and Central African Championships in Zanzibar, also in the long jump.

On 28 May 1976, Mushanga set the Zambian national long jump record. He jumped 7.63 metres at a meeting in Zanzibar City, Tanzania.

In July 1978, Mushanga competed in the long and triple jump at the 1978 African Games. He placed 5th in both events, jumping 15.54 metres to set the Zambian triple jump national record and 7.54 m in the long jump. He was called "unlucky not to have at least managed a bronze" with his performance.

The following month, Mushanga competed in the long and triple jump at the 1978 Commonwealth Games. In the triple jump, he was the first non-qualifier for the finals with a 15.45 m best. In the long jump qualifiers on 8 August, he jumped 7.41 m to advance, winning his qualification group. In the finals, he improved to 7.68 m wind-aided, finishing in 7th place overall. His place was the highest placing of any Zambian athlete at the Commonwealth Games in any event.

At the 1979 East and Central African Championships again in Mombasa, Mushanga won a gold medal in the triple jump and a bronze in the long jump.

Mushanga entered in the long and triple jump at the 1980 Summer Olympics, but he only started in the triple jump. He jumped 14.79 m on his first attempt and passed the following two attempts, placing 17th overall and failing to advance to the finals.

== Personal life ==
Mushanga was also the Police Coach and National Coach of the Zambian teams while he was still competing. He was called the best long and triple jumper in Zambian history, made more impressive by his achievements despite his Police and National coaching responsibilities.
