= The Vale Academy =

School in North Lincolnshire, England

Location
- Atherton Way; Brigg, North Lincolnshire, DN20 8AR; England; 53°33′33″N 0°29′31″W

Information
- School type: Academy Academy converter
- Motto: 'Join in, Join in.'
- Religious affiliation: Mixed
- Opened: 1 September 2011
- Local authority: North Lincolnshire
- Department for Education URN: 137453 Tables
- Ofsted: Reports
- Chair of Governors: Steven Hodsman
- Principal: Sarah Stokes
- Staff: 82
- Gender: Coeducational
- Age: 11 to 18
- Enrolment: 742
- Website: https://www.valeacademy.org.uk

The Vale Academy is a co-educational secondary school with academy status on Atherton Way in the market town of Brigg, North Lincolnshire, England.

The Vale Academy is one of two schools in Brigg, the other being Sir John Nelthorpe School, they previously operated as the Brigg Sixth Form College.

== History ==
=== Two Secondary modern schools ===
The school was previously a secondary modern school. Building began in 1955. It was to be called Brigg Secondary Modern School, but was called Glanford Secondary School, and cost £110,089, for the Lindsey Education Committee. It was a two-form entry.

There were seven classrooms, two dining rooms, four rooms for woodwork, housecraft, arts and crafts, and science, and a hall and gymnasium. It opened on Thursday 10 January 1957 on Redcombe Road. Another two-form secondary modern school was planned for Broughton. The headteacher was Mr Ernest Urry, the former head of Caistor Secondary Modern School (now Caistor Yarborough Academy) from 1951, and there were 13 teachers and 320 children.

The school was officially opened 6 November 1957 by Colonel Nelthorpe. Ernest Urry died in August 1990, aged 82, in Stamford, Lincolnshire.

The adjoining Brigg Westmoor Secondary opened in September 1959. This school, to the north, was officially opened on Wednesday 21 September 1960 by the Bishop of Lincoln, Kenneth Riches. It cost £110,000, with ten teachers, nine classrooms and 280 children.

In 1972, both schools became Brigg Secondary School.

=== Comprehensive School ===
It became a comprehensive school in September 1976. At the time, it had around 800 children on the Westmoor school site. It became a Music and Technology College in 2007. It joined the Schools Partnership Trust and officially became an academy on 1 September 2011.

In 2011 the Vale had GCSE results of 69% at grades A*-C, which was above the local education authority's average of 52%. The students at the school make good progress – in the last two years value added scores for student progress have been positive. The Sixth Form value added score is also positive for progress at 0.22 and A*-C grades at A level have risen to 86%.

In 2013 the school received a Grade 2 (good) rating for overall effectiveness in its Ofsted inspection. This was consolidated with a shorter follow up inspection performed in 2017 where The Academy retained its good rating.

In January 2017, the Vale moved into a new building. The old school buildings of Glanford and Westmoor Schools were demolished later that year along with a 3rd building which was formerly used for PE and Tech lessons.

In 2024, Brigg Sixth Form split to form The Vale Academy Sixth Form and Brigg Sixth Form @ SJN.

=== Visits ===
- On 11 December 2018, the Princess Royal visited

== Admissions ==
The Vale Academy follows local authority policy on admissions.

== Notable former pupils ==
- Guy Martin – Motorcycle racer and TV presenter.
