= Nathot =

Village in Punjab, Pakistan

Coordinates: 32°51′N 73°13′E

Nathot is a village in Jhelum District, Punjab, Pakistan. It is situated about 68 km from Jhelum and near Chakwal city. It has a population of 2,646 per the 2017 Pakistani census.

The language spoken in the village is Punjabi. Most people make a living from farming, cattle, and particularly from growing wheat. However number of People working abroad specially Middle east has increased in last few years. The army is second most favourite job for residents. Almost every family has at least one person serving in the Pakistan Army.
