= Joel Otim =

Ugandan sprinter (1971–2021)

Joel Otim Bua (2 July 1971 – 16 June 2021) was a Ugandan sprinter.

== Biography ==
He competed in the men's 100m competition at the 1992 Summer Olympics. He recorded a 10.94, not enough to qualify for the next round past the heats. His personal best was 10.50, set in 1990. He was vice-president of the Uganda Olympians Association (UOA) since its inception in 2014. He died in Kampala.
