= Jorem Ochana =

Ugandan hurdler

Personal information
- Nationality: Ugandan
- Born: 21 June 1935 (age 90)

Sport
- Sport: Track and field
- Event: 400 metres hurdles

Jorem Ochana (born 21 June 1935) is a Ugandan hurdler. He competed in the men's 400 metres hurdles at the 1964 Summer Olympics.
