= Moses Kiyai =

Kenyan athletics competitor

Personal information
- Born: 1962 (age 63–64) Kapsabet, Kenya

Sport
- Sport: Track and field
Medal record
Representing Kenya
African Championships
Bronze medal – third place	1982 Cairo	Long jump

Moses Kiyai (born 1962) is a retired Kenyan long jumper and triple jumper.

Kiyai competed for the Iowa State Cyclones track and field team in the NCAA.

Kiyai won a bronze medal at the 1982 African Championships. He won the East African Championships in the long jump in 1981, 1982 and 1984 and became triple jump champion in 1982. At the 1982 Commonwealth Games he finished sixth in the long jump and eighth in the triple jump. He also competed at the 1984 Olympic Games without reaching the final in neither long nor triple jump.

His personal best jump was 8.08 metres, achieved in May 1984 in Lincoln, Nebraska. In the triple jump he had 16.27 metres from 1986.
