= Chris Commons (long jumper) =

Australian long jumper

Personal information
- Born: Christopher John Commons; 9 December 1950 (age 75)

Sport
- Country: Australia
- Sport: Athletics
- Event: Long jump
- Club: Box Hill Athletics Club, Melbourne University Athletics Club, Geelong Guild Athletics Club
Medal record
Men's Athletics
Representing Australia
British Commonwealth Games
Silver medal – second place	1974 Christchurch	Long jump
Silver medal – second place	1978 Edmonton	Long jump
Pacific Conference Games
Silver medal – second place	1973 Toronto	Long jump
Gold medal – first place	1977 Canberra	Long jump
New Zealand Games 1975
Gold medal – first place	1975 Christchurch	Long jump

Christopher John Commons (born 9 December 1950) is a retired long jumper from Australia, who represented his country in the 1976 Summer Olympics in Montreal.

Commons won silver medals in the 1974 and 1978 Commonwealth Games during his career. A four-time national champion in the men's long jump (1973–1976), he held the Australian Residential Long Jump Record of 8.08 metres. He won the Pacific Conference Games in 1977 and was second in the event in 1973.

He won the New Zealand Games in Christchurch in 1975 and competed in the World University Games (Universiade) in 1973 in Moscow.

Commons was ranked sixth in the world by the magazine Track & Field News in 1975. He received the Athlete of the Year award from the Athletics International organisation for the 1974–5 season.

As a young athlete, Commons was the Australian Junior Champion (under 19 years of age) in the triple jump for three consecutive years (1967–9).

His brothers, Don Commons, a triple jumper, and David Commons, were also notable athletes.

== Academic career ==
Commons completed a Doctor of Philosophy (PhD) degree in inorganic chemistry at the University of Melbourne in 1975. In later years, he had a distinguished career as a teacher of chemistry and as an educational administrator. He has authored numerous secondary school chemistry text books as well as chemistry research articles, in the fields of X-ray crystallography and coordination complexes.

== See also ==
- Australian athletics champions
- Athletics at the 1973 Summer Universiade
- Craven, John G. (2022). The Conquerors: 100 Geelong Region All-Time Sports Greats and Brownlow Medallists. Bas Publishing. ISBN 9-781921-49648-6.
