= Lilian Nyiti =

Tanzanian middle-distance runner

Personal information
- Nationality: Tanzanian
- Born: 3 June 1959 (age 67)

Sport
- Sport: Middle-distance running
- Event: 800 metres

Lilian Nyiti (born 3 June 1959) is a Tanzanian middle-distance runner. She competed in the women's 800 metres at the 1980 Summer Olympics.
