= Edvīns Zāģeris =

Latvian hurdler

Personal information
- Nationality: Latvian
- Born: 10 May 1943 (age 82) Daudzevas pagasts, Reichskommissariat Ostland

Sport
- Country: Soviet Union
- Sport: Track and field
- Event: 400 metres hurdles

Edvīns Zāģeris (born 10 May 1943), also known as Edvin Zageris (Russian: Эдвин Загерис), is a Latvian hurdler. He competed for the Soviet Union at the 1964 Summer Olympics in the men's 400 metres hurdles event.
