= Justin Arop =

Ugandan javelin thrower

Medal record

Men's athletics

Representing Uganda

African Championships
Gold medal – first place	1988 Annaba	Javelin throw
Bronze medal – third place	1985 Cairo	Javelin throw
Bronze medal – third place	1990 Cairo	Javelin throw

Justin Arop (March 24, 1958 – 1994) was a track and field athlete from Uganda, who competed in the men's javelin throw event during his career. A two-time winner at the All-Africa Games (1978 and 1987) he represented his native East African country at three consecutive Summer Olympics, starting in Moscow, Soviet Union (1980). There he set his best Olympic result by finishing in 12th place in the overall-rankings.

At the Lite Summer Games held at the Duke University Campus in Durham (North Carolina, USA), on June 27, 1982, Arop threw the javelin to a winning personal best of 84.58 meters (old design). He currently holds the Ugandan record with 75.52 m (new design).

== International competitions ==
Year	Competition	Venue	Position	Event	Notes
Representing Uganda
1984	Olympic Games	Los Angeles, United States	27th	Javelin throw	69.76 m
1987	All-Africa Games	Nairobi, Kenya	1st	Javelin throw	73.42 m
1987	World Championships	Rome, Italy	29th	Javelin throw	71.76 m
1988	Olympic Games	Seoul, South Korea	33rd	Javelin throw	69.10 m

== Seasonal bests by year ==
- 1987 - 71.76
- 1988 - 75.72 NR
