= Koch-Goma =

Ugandan settlement

- Map of Uganda showing location of Koch-Goma
- Coordinates: 02°36′16″N 32°10′25″E
- Country: Uganda
- Region: Northern Region
- Sub-region: Acholi sub-region
- District: Nwoya District
- Elevation: 997 m (3,271 ft)

Population (2014 Census)
  - Total: 15,000
- Time zone: UTC+3 (EAT)

Koch-Goma, also Koch Goma, is a human settlement in Nwoya District, in the Northern Region of Uganda.

== Location ==
The town lies in Nwoya District, approximately 21 kilometres (13 mi) by road, east of Nwoya Town, where the district headquarters are located.

Koch-Goma is located approximately 25 kilometres (16 mi), southwest of Gulu, the largest city in the Northern Region of Uganda, along a new asphalt-topped road.

The geographical coordinates of Koch-Goma are: 2°36'16.0"N, 32°10'25.0"E (Latitude:2.604444; Longitude:32.173611). Koch-Goma sits at an average elevation of 997 metres (3,271 ft), above sea level.

== Overview ==
On February 23, 1988, during the War in Uganda, rebels of the Holy Spirit Movement led by Joseph Kony attacked the town, killing over 40 civilians as well as many government soldiers.

In July 2019, Koch-Goma was reported to be the fastest-growing settlement in Nwoya District, according to the Daily Monitor newspaper. It is a nascent urban centre which is also the headquarters of Koch-Goma sub-county.

== Population ==
The national census and household population survey enumerated the population of Koch-Goma at 15,000 people.

== Education ==
The available schools in the community range from nursery schools, elementary school and secondary schools. The schools range from private, community and government schools. They include (a) Koch-Goma Central Primary School (b) Coo-Rom Primary School (c) Kalang Primary School (d) Ter-Okono Community School and (e) Koch-Goma Senior Secondary School, among others.

== Energy ==
As of July 2019, Koch-Goma was not yet connected to Uganda's national electricity grid. Those with electric connections use private solar energy installations.

== Agriculture ==
The soils around Koch-Goma are very fertile. Crops supported include cotton, cassava and sim sim. The sub-county is a leading supplier of sim sim in Uganda.
