= Jean-Jacques Behm =

French hurdler (born 1942)

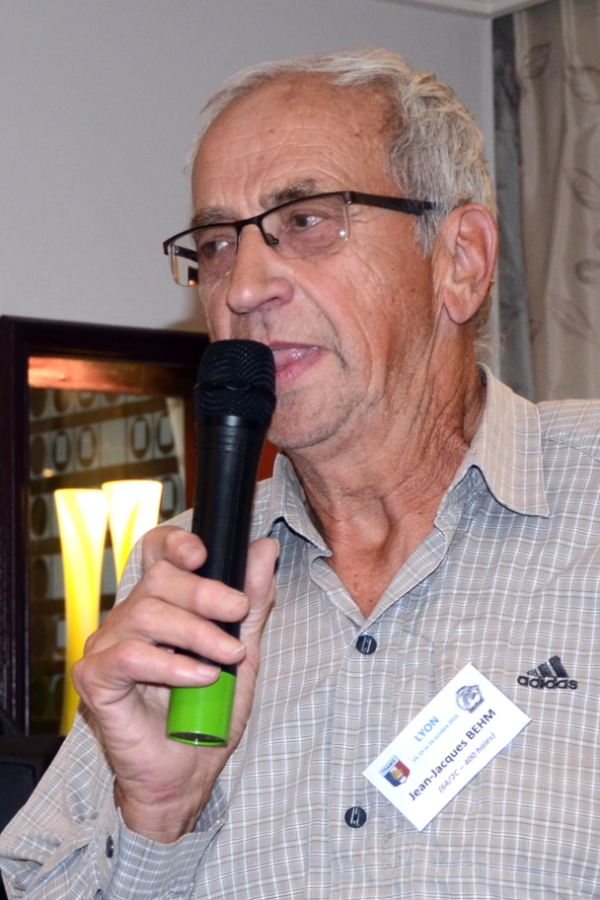
- Jean-Jacques Behm in 2016

Personal information
- Nationality: French
- Born: 4 May 1942 (age 84) Lyon, France

Sport
- Sport: Track and field
- Event: 400 metres hurdles

Jean-Jacques Behm (born 4 May 1942) is a French hurdler. He competed in the men's 400 metres hurdles at the 1964 Summer Olympics.
