= Vasyl Anisimov =

Soviet hurdler

Personal information
- Nationality: Soviet
- Born: 23 January 1938 (age 88) Kharkiv, Ukrainian SSR, USSR

Sport
- Sport: hurdling, sprinting
- Events: 400 m hurdles, 4 × 400 metres relay

Vasyl Anisimov (Ukrainian: Василь Анісімов; born 23 January 1938) is a former Soviet-Ukrainian hurdler and sprinter. He competed in the men's 400 metres hurdles and the men's 4 × 400 metres relay at the 1964 Summer Olympics.
