= Mike Hogan (athlete) =

British hurdler

Personal information
- Nationality: British
- Born: 9 May 1943 (age 83) Oxford, Great Britain

Sport
- Sport: Track and field
- Event: 400 metres hurdles
Medal record
Representing Great Britain
Summer Universiade
Silver medal – second place	1963 Porto Alegre	400m hurdles
Bronze medal – third place	1963 Porto Alegre	110m hurdles

John Michael Walter "Mike" Hogan (born 9 May 1943) is a British hurdler. He competed in the men's 400 metres hurdles at the 1964 Summer Olympics.
