= Horst Gieseler =

German hurdler (born 1942)

Personal information
- Nationality: German
- Born: 29 April 1942 (age 84)

Sport
- Sport: Track and field
- Event: 400 metres hurdles

Horst Gieseler (born 29 April 1942) is a German hurdler. He competed in the men's 400 metres hurdles at the 1964 Summer Olympics.
