= Ken Roche =

Australian former hurdler (born 1941)

Personal information
- Born: Kenneth James Roche; 24 October 1941 (age 84)

Sport
- Country: Australia
Medal record
Men's athletics
Representing Australia
Commonwealth Games
Gold medal – first place	1962 Perth	440 yards hurdles
Gold medal – first place	1966 Kingston	440 yards hurdles

Kenneth James Roche AO (born 24 October 1941) is an Australian former hurdler who competed in the 1964 Summer Olympics. He was made an Officer of the Order of Australia in 2004 for services to the development of the construction industry in Australia and a range of related professional organisations, to education, and to the community.
