= Paul Dallow =

John Paul Dallow is a former New Zealand athletics representative. He was educated at St Peter's College, Auckland where he commenced his interest in athletics. He represented New Zealand as a hurdler. He represented New Zealand in 1960 in Melbourne in the 120, 220 and 440 Yards Hurdles; in 1962 he represented New Zealand at the Empire Games held in Perth in the 120 and 440 Yards Hurdles.
