= Amos Omolo =

Ugandan sprinter

Personal information
- Nationality: Ugandan
- Born: 9 March 1937 (age 89) Kenya

Sport
- Sport: Sprinting
- Event: 100 metres

Amos Omolo (born 9 March 1937) is a Ugandan sprinter. He competed in the men's 100 metres at the 1968 Summer Olympics. He won a bronze medal at the 440 yards at the 1962 British Empire and Commonwealth Games.
