= Roberto Frinolli =

Italian athletics competitor

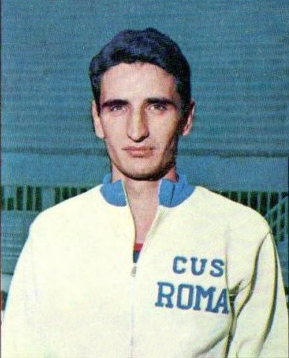

Personal information
- Full name: Roberto Frinolli Puzzilli
- Nationality: Italian
- Born: 13 November 1940 (age 85) Garbatella, Rome, Italy
- Height: 1.75 m (5 ft 9 in)
- Weight: 65 kg (143 lb)

Sport
- Country: Italy
- Sport: Athletics
- Event: 400 metres hurdles

Achievements and titles
- Personal best: 400 m hurdles: 49.14 (1968)
Medal record
Men's athletics
Representing Italy
European Championships
Gold medal – first place	1966 Budapest	400 m hurdles
Summer Universiade
Gold medal – first place	1963 Porto Alegre	400 m hurdles
Gold medal – first place	1965 Budapest	400 m hurdles
Gold medal – first place	1965 Budapest	4×400 m
Bronze medal – third place	1963 Porto Alegre	4×400 m

Roberto Frinolli (Rome, 13 November 1940) is a former Italian athlete specialising in the 400 metres hurdles.

== Biography ==
Born in Garbatella, he attended athletics school, first trying the 110 metres hurdles before settling on the 400 metres hurdles. He went on to become the Italian national champion six times, 1963-1966 and 1968–9.

He qualified for three Olympics, 1964 through 1972, making it to the final in 1964 and 1968. At the 1968 Olympics, he ran his personal best of 49.14 in the semi-finals, placing him in the centre of the track for the final. He ran an even pace with eventual winner David Hemery, who was in the process of setting the world record. Frinolli paid for that hard early pace, struggling home in last place.

Frinolli was ranked number one in the world in 1965 and 1966. He won the 1966 European Championships and twice at the World University Games. He is the father of Giorgio Frinolli.

== See also ==
- FIDAL Hall of Fame
- Italy national relay team
