= Elizabeth Chesire =

Kenyan middle-distance runner

Personal information
- Born: 9 January 1950 (age 76) Tambach, Elgeyo-Marakwet, Kenya
- Height: 162 cm (5 ft 4 in)
- Weight: 54 kg (119 lb)

Sport
- Country: Kenya
- Sport: Middle-distance running
- Event: 800 metres

Elizabeth Chesire (born 9 January 1950) is a Kenyan middle-distance runner. She competed in the women's 800 metres at the 1968 Summer Olympics.
