= Judy Peckham =

Australian sprinter and middle-distance runner

Personal information
- Born: 9 December 1950 (age 75) New South Wales, Australia

Sport
- Sport: Track and field
Medal record
Representing Australia
Commonwealth Games
Gold medal – first place	1978 Edmonton	800m
Silver medal – second place	1974 Christchurch	4×400 m relay
Silver medal – second place	1978 Edmonton	4×400 m relay
Summer Universiade
Silver medal – second place	1973 Moscow	400m

Judith Peckham (née Canty; born 9 December 1950) is a former Australian track and field athlete who competed in the 400 metres and 800 metres.

She was a member of the 4×400 metres relay team which finished in fourth place at the 1976 Summer Olympic Games in Montreal, Quebec, Canada and she won the gold medal in the 800 metres at the 1978 Commonwealth Games in Edmonton, Alberta, Canada. She married high jumper Lawrie Peckham.
