= Robin Woodland =

British athlete

Personal information
- Nationality: British (English)
- Born: 21 January 1938 (age 87) Lambeth, London, England

Sport
- Sport: Athletics
- Event: hurdles / 400m
- Club: Hercules AC

Robin Arthur Woodland (born 21 January 1938), is a male former athlete who competed for England.

== Biography ==
Woodland was selected by England to represent his country in athletics events. He was selected to represent Great Britain at the 1962 European Athletics Championships and the 1966 European Athletics Championships.

Woodland also represented the England team in the 440 yard hurdles, just finishing outside the medals in fourth place, at the 1966 British Empire and Commonwealth Games in Kingston, Jamaica.

He was a member of the Hercules Athletics Club in Wimbledon and won 12 Surrey County titles from 1953 to 1967 over varying disciplines. Woodland also finished third behind Willie Atterberry in the 440 yards hurdles event at the 1963 AAA Championships.
