= Jay Luck =

American hurdler

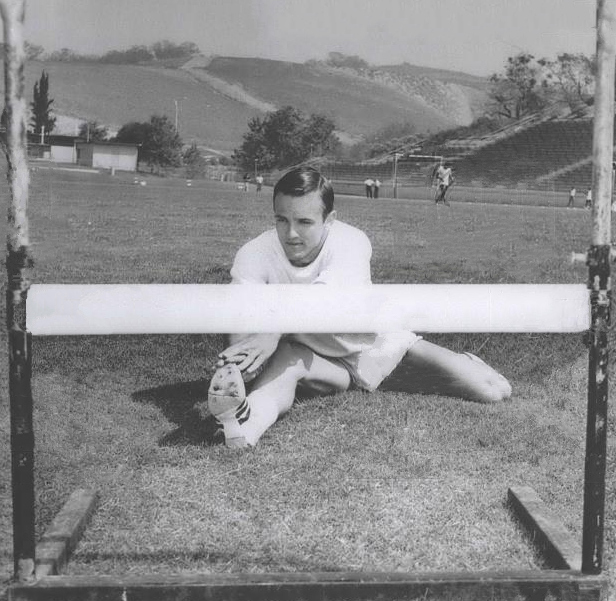
- Jay Luck in 1964

Personal information
- Born: July 11, 1940 (age 85) Westerly, Rhode Island, U.S.
- Height: 180 cm (5 ft 11 in)
- Weight: 73 kg (161 lb)

Sport
- Sport: Athletics
- Event(s): Sprint, hurdles
- Club: New Haven Track Club

Achievements and titles
- Personal best(s): 200 m – 21.2 (1963); 440 yd – 46.7 (1965); 120 ydH – 14.3 (1962); 400 mH – 49.4 (1964)

James Edward "Jay" Luck (born July 11, 1940) is a retired American hurdler and sprinter who mostly competed in the 400 m hurdles.

Luck competed for the Yale Bulldogs track and field team in the NCAA.

He placed fifth at the 1964 Summer Olympics. At the AAU championships, he was fourth in 1961–62, second in 1964, and third in 1965.
