= Tekla Chemabwai =

Kenyan athlete

Tecla Chemabwai Sang (born February 3, 1954) is a Kenyan retired sprinter and middle-distance runner who represented Kenya in track and field athletics.

Chemabwai competed at the 1968 Summer Olympics, but did not advance past 400 metres heats. Alongside Lydia Stephens-Oketch and Elizabeth Chesire she was the first Kenyan woman athlete compete at the Olympics. She competed again at the 1972 Summer Olympics, reaching quarterfinals (2nd round). She won 400 metres race at the 1973 All-Africa games, becoming the first Kenyan woman to win All-Africa Games gold medal in athletics. She competed at the AIAW Outdoor Track and Field Championships for the Chicago State Cougars track and field team in 1974.

Chemabwai won silver at the 1978 Commonwealth Games 800 metres race. It was only the second Commonwealth Games medal won by Kenyan women athlete, the first one was by Sabina Chebichi, who finished third at the 1974 Commonwealth Games 800 metres race. At the 1978 All-Africa games she won the 800 metres race. She also won number of East and Central African championships over 200 and 400 metres

Chemabwai was married to Julius Sang. She believes that being a wife of another runner, she was able to have a long career, unlike many other Kenyan female runners whose careers are cut short by family life. As of 2002, she was a university athletics coach. Her forename is sometimes spelled Tecla. She had five children, namely Collins Kipchumba, Christine Chebet, Lee Kipngetich, Ieelyn Chepchirchir and Rosemary Cheptanui.
