= Kuda Ditta =

Malaysian Olympic athlete

Personal information
- Full name: Bala Ditta
- Nickname: Kuda
- Nationality: Malaysian
- Born: 4 February 1937 Bario, Miri, Kingdom of Sarawak (now Malaysia)
- Died: 17 June 2003 (aged 66) Miri, Malaysia

Sport
- Country: Sarawak (c. 1962); Malaysia
- Sport: Athletics
Medal record
Men's athletics
Representing Malaysia
Southeast Asian Peninsular Games
| Silver medal – second place | 1973 Singapore | Men's 110 m |
| Bronze medal – third place | 1971 Kuala Lumpur | Men's 110 m |

Bala Ditta (born Kuda Ditta, 4 February 1937 – 17 June 2003) is a Malaysian athlete who competed for Malaysia at the 1964 Summer Olympics. He has also represented the then Crown Colony of Sarawak at the Commonwealth and Asian Games.

== Career ==
Kuda was selected to compete for the then British Crown Colony of Sarawak at the 1962 Commonwealth Games in Perth, Western Australia. He also competed for Sarawak at the 1962 Asian Games in Jakarta, Indonesia where he qualified for the semifinals of his event.

He became the first Malaysian from Sarawak to participate in the Summer Olympics, competing at the 1964 edition.

Kuda won the a bronze at the 1971 Southeast Asian Peninsular Games and a silver at the 1973 edition of the Games. Both medals were won at the 110 meter event.

== Later life ==
After his retirement from competitive sports, Kuda served with the Police Field Force and coached recruits. He retired in December 1988 from the police.

== Death ==
He died due to stomach cancer at his residence in Padang Kerbau in Miri, Sarawak on 17 June 2003.

== Personal life ==
Kuda is an Evangelical Christian from the Bario town in Sarawak. He was married to Ubung Taie Riwat with whom he had five children. Kuda changed his name to Bala Ditta following the birth of his first child.

Olympic Games
| Preceded by Participated as Federation of Malaya | Flagbearer for Malaysia; Tokyo 1964 | Succeeded by Nashatar Singh Sidhu |
