= Kimaru Songok =

Kenyan hurdler (1936–1987)

Kimaru Songok (1936 – 7 March 1987) was a Kenyan runner who specialised in 400 metres hurdles. He was born in Nandi District

He was among the first Kenyan medalists internationally, when he won silver in 440 yards hurdles at the 1962 Commonwealth Games. Songok was also part of the Kenyan 4 x 440 yards relay team which finished fifth. Other members of the relay team were Wilson Kiprugut, Peter Francis and Seraphino Antao. At the same games, Antao became the first Kenyan international champion.

He won 400 metres hurdles gold medal at the inaugural All-Africa Games in 1965. He also won multiple gold medals at the East and Central African Championships. He competed at the 1964 and 1968 Olympics, but failed to advance beyond heats both times.
