= Gary Knoke =

Australian hurdler and sprinter (1942–1984)

Gary James Knoke (4 February 1942 – 9 July 1984) was an Australian Olympic Games and Commonwealth Games competing track and field athlete who was ranked third in the world in 400 metres hurdles during 1966.

== National representative ==
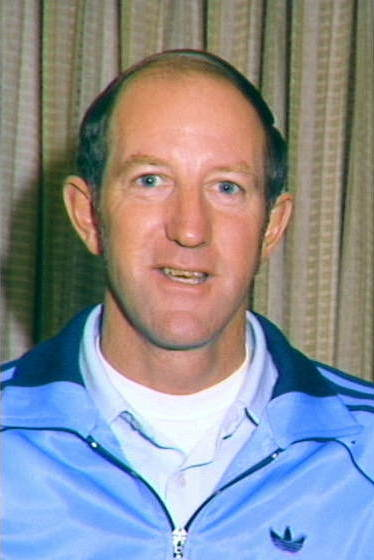
Australian Institute of Sport Athletics Coach Gary Knoke in 1981

Knoke represented Australia at the 1964 Summer Olympics (Tokyo), 1968 Summer Olympics (Mexico City) and 1972 Summer Olympics (Munich). In Tokyo, on 16 October 1964, he was placed fourth in the 400 metre hurdles final behind Rex Cawley of the United States of America, John Cooper of Great Britain and Salvatore Morale of Italy. He attended the 1962 British Empire and Commonwealth Games, 1966 British Empire and Commonwealth Games, 1970 British Commonwealth Games, 1974 British Commonwealth Games and the Pacific Conference Games twice.

== World ranking ==
During his competitive career in the 400 Metre Hurdles, Knoke was ranked as follows:

- 1964 - Seventh
- 1965 - Eighth
- 1966 - Third
- 1967 - Tenth
- 1968 - Ninth
- 1969 - Tenth

== Teaching and coaching career ==
He began his teaching career at Kingsgrove North High School in 1963. From 1974 until 1980, Knoke was a physical education teacher and athletics coach at Newington College. During that time Newington won the Athletic Association of the Great Public Schools of New South Wales (GPS) junior athletics four times and the senior athletics once. In 1981 he joined the staff of the Australian Institute of Sport as a hurdles coach. Knoke died in 1984 of cancer.

== Honours ==
Knoke Avenue in Gordon, Australian Capital Territory, is named in his honour. The Gary Knoke Memorial Scholarship is an award for track and field athletics presented annually by the Australian Institute of Sport; recipients of this scholarship have included Simon Hollingsworth, Rohan Robinson and Kyle Vander Kuyp.
