= Rex Cawley =

American hurdler (1940–2022)

Personal information
- Full name: Warren Jay Cawley
- Born: July 6, 1940 Highland Park, Michigan, U.S.
- Died: January 21, 2022 (aged 81) Orange, California, U.S.
Medal record
Men's athletics
Representing the United States
Olympic Games
Gold medal – first place	1964 Tokyo	400 m hurdles

Pathe Highlights of world record @:40 Video on YouTube

Warren Jay Cawley (July 6, 1940 – January 21, 2022) was an American athlete, winner of 400 m hurdles at the 1964 Summer Olympics.

Cawley was born in Highland Park, Michigan. He attended Farmington High School.

Cawley still holds the record time for the 100 yard dash at Farmington High School that he set in 1959. He was Track and Field News "High School Athlete of the Year" in 1959. He won the AAU championships in 440-yard hurdles in 1963 and 1965 and as a University of Southern California student, he won an NCAA title in 440 yd hurdles in 1963.

At the Olympic Trials in 1964, Cawley set a world record in 400 m hurdles with a time of 49.1, thus becoming a main favorite at the Olympic Games. Cawley won the gold medal in Tokyo with a commanding performance in which he beat his nearest competitor John Cooper from Great Britain by 0.5 seconds.

Cawley won the British AAA Championships title in the 440 yards hurdles event at the 1965 AAA Championships.

He died on January 21, 2022, at the age of 81.

Awards
Preceded by Dallas Long	Track & Field News High School Boys Athlete of the Year; 1959	Succeeded by Mel Renfro
