= Athletics at the 1991 All-Africa Games =

Athletics at the V All-Africa Games
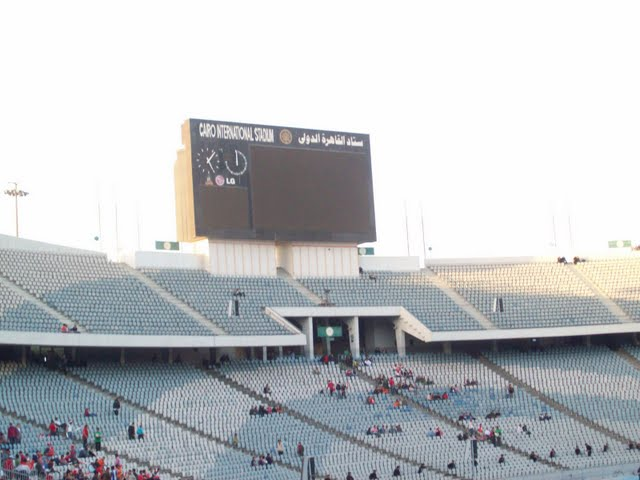
- Dates: 23–27 September
- Host city: Cairo, Egypt
- Venue: Cairo International Stadium

The athletics competition at the 1991 All-Africa Games was held from 23–27 September 1991 in Cairo, Egypt.

== Medal summary ==
=== Men's events ===
Event	Gold		Silver		Bronze	
100 metres (wind: +0.5 m/s)	Frankie Fredericks; Namibia	10.18 GR	Davidson Ezinwa; Nigeria	10.24	Emmanuel Tuffour; Ghana	10.30
200 metres (wind: +1.2 m/s)	Frankie Fredericks; Namibia	20.28 GR	Emmanuel Tuffour; Ghana	20.59	Daniel Phillip; Nigeria	20.62
400 metres	Samson Kitur; Kenya	45.40	Sunday Bada; Nigeria	45.81	Francis Ogola; Uganda	46.21
800 metres	William Tanui; Kenya	1:47.40	Robert Kibet; Kenya	1:47.69	Kennedy Osei; Ghana	1:48.41
1500 metres	William Kimei; Kenya	3:41.97	Desta Asgedom; Ethiopia	3:42.65	Alemayehu Roba; Ethiopia	3:42.91
5000 metres	Fita Bayissa; Ethiopia	13:36.91	Ibrahim Kinuthia; Kenya	13:37.67	Ondoro Osoro; Kenya	13:38.60
10,000 metres	Thomas Osano; Kenya	27:56.45 GR	William Koech; Kenya	27:56.86	Chala Kelile; Ethiopia	28:11.73
Marathon	Tena Negere; Ethiopia	2:31:17	Ernest Tjela; Lesotho	2:31:42	Allaoua Khélil; Algeria	2:32:29
3000 metres steeplechase	Moses Kiptanui; Kenya	8:27.09	William Mutwol; Kenya	8:28.29	Johnstone Kipkoech; Kenya	8:33.88
110 metres hurdles (wind: +1.0 m/s)	Judex Lefou; Mauritius	14.12	Noureddine Tadjine; Algeria	14.17	Emeka Osaji; Nigeria	14.22
400 metres hurdles	Erick Keter; Kenya	48.95	Gideon Yego; Kenya	49.09	Amadou Dia Bâ; Senegal	49.12
4 × 100 metres relay	Nigeria; Victor Omagbemi; Innocent Asonze; Oluyemi Kayode; Davidson Ezinwa	39.36	Senegal; Edoard Samatey; Amadou M'Baye; Joseph Diaz (sprinter); Charles-Louis Seck	40.00	Kenya; Joseph Gikonyo; Kennedy Ondiek; Donald Onchiri; Amos Rutere	40.70
4 × 400 metres relay	Kenya; Simeon Kipkemboi; Erick Keter; Simon Kemboi; Samson Kitur	3:03.14	Nigeria; Sunday Bada; Hassan Bosso; Clement Chukwu; Abu Danjuma	3:03.72	Ghana; Ahmed Ali; Nelson Boateng; Timothy Hesse; Kennedy Osei	3:08.18
20 kilometre road walk	Shemsu Hassan; Ethiopia	1:29:04 GR	Abdelwahab Ferguène; Algeria	1:35:21	Abderrahmane Djebbar; Algeria	1:38:11
High jump	Othmane Belfaa; Algeria	2.18	Boubacar Guèye; Senegal	2.16	Yacine Mousli; Algeria	2.16
Pole vault	Sami Si Mohamed; Algeria	5.20 GR	Belgacem Touami; Algeria	5.10	Kersley Gardenne; Mauritius	5.00
Long jump	George Ogbeide; Nigeria	8.22	Yusuf Alli; Nigeria	7.81	James Sabulei; Kenya	7.72
Triple jump	James Sabulei; Kenya	16.53	Paul Nioze; Seychelles	16.50	Benjamin Koech; Kenya	16.26
Shot put	Chima Ugwu; Nigeria	17.64	Adewale Olukoju; Nigeria	17.58	Martin Mélagne; Ivory Coast	17.33
Discus throw	Adewale Olukoju; Nigeria	59.22 GR	Mohamed Naguib Hamed; Egypt	55.32	Hassan Ahmed Hamad; Egypt	54.90
Hammer throw	Sherif Farouk El Hennawi; Egypt	67.58	Hakim Toumi; Algeria	63.12	Magdi Zakaria Abdallah; Egypt	62.10
Javelin throw	Christian Okemefula; Nigeria	77.14	Pius Bazighe; Nigeria	71.78	James Saina; Kenya	71.44
Decathlon	Mourad Mahour Bacha; Algeria	7431 GR	Tommy Ozono; Nigeria	7163	Sid Ali Sabour; Algeria	6956

- In the men's 4 × 100 metres relay, a Sierra Leonan team of David Sawyer, Horace Dove-Edwin, Haroun Korjie, and Sanusi Turay originally finished as runners-up with a time of 39.66 seconds, but were later disqualified for fielding an ineligible runner.
- In the men's 4 × 400 metres relay, the Ugandan team originally finished third with a time of 3:07.72 minutes.

=== Women's events ===
Event	Gold		Silver		Bronze	
100 metres (wind: +0.8 m/s)	Mary Onyali; Nigeria	11.12	Beatrice Utondu; Nigeria	11.13	Rufina Uba; Nigeria	11.43
200 metres (wind: +1.0 m/s)	Tina Iheagwam; Nigeria	22.82	Fatima Yusuf; Nigeria	22.84	Christy Opara-Thompson; Nigeria	23.68
400 metres	Fatima Yusuf; Nigeria	50.71	Charity Opara; Nigeria	51.23	Airat Bakare; Nigeria	52.98
800 metres	Maria de Lurdes Mutola; Mozambique	2:04.02	Zewde Haile Mariam; Ethiopia	2:04.99	Gladys Wamuyu; Kenya	2:07.14
1500 metres	Susan Sirma; Kenya	4:10.68	Margaret Kigari; Kenya	4:12.34	Getenesh Urge; Ethiopia	4:12.38
3000 metres	Susan Sirma; Kenya	8:49.33	Luchia Yishak; Ethiopia	8:51.04	Delillah Asiago; Kenya	8:55.53
10000 metres	Derartu Tulu; Ethiopia	33:40.37	Lydia Cheromei; Kenya	33:53.00	Tigist Moreda; Ethiopia	33:59.76
100 metres hurdles	Ime Akpan; Nigeria	13.44	Taiwo Aladefa; Nigeria	13.51	Nicole Ramalalanirina; Madagascar	13.70
400 metres hurdles	Marie Womplou; Ivory Coast	57.35	Omolade Akinremi; Nigeria	58.16	Omotayo Akinremi; Nigeria	58.85
4 × 100 metres relay	Nigeria; Chioma Ajunwa; Rufina Ubah; Beatrice Utondu; Mary Onyali	44.21	Ivory Coast; Alimata Kone; Marie Womplou; Louise Ayétotché; Olga Mutanda	45.86	Madagascar; Ramy Razafimanantsoa; Hamitra Rakotondrabe; Nicole Ramalalanirina; Lalao Ravaorina	45.96
4 × 400 metres relay	Nigeria; Omotayo Akinremi; Airat Bakare; Charity Opara; Fatima Yusuf	3:31.05	Kenya; Gladys Wamuyu; Pharis Wanja; Marcela Mbunde; Jane Kimatia	3:41.20	Ivory Coast; Louise Ayétotché; Alimata Koné; Olga Mutanda; Marie Womplou	3:44.06
5000 metre track walk	Agnetha Chelimo; Kenya	24:25.00	Grace Karimi; Kenya	24:33.86	Dounia Kara; Algeria	25:27.03
High jump	Lucienne N'Da; Ivory Coast	1.83	Ifeanyi Aduba; Nigeria	1.73	Stella Agbaegbu; Nigeria	1.70
Long jump	Chioma Ajunwa; Nigeria	6.67	Beatrice Utondu; Nigeria	6.50	Christy Opara-Thompson; Nigeria	6.33
Shot put	Hanan Ahmed Khaled; Egypt	14.88	Elizabeth Olaba; Kenya	14.83	Mariam Nnodu; Nigeria	14.66
Discus throw	Hanan Ahmed Khaled; Egypt	48.32	Hiba Meshili Abu Zaghari; Egypt	46.88	Wilma Brendenham; Namibia	46.42 (NR)
Javelin throw	Seraphina Nyauma; Kenya	51.94	Ann Otutu; Nigeria	50.54	Matilda Kisava; Tanzania	46.58
Heptathlon	Rita Izojie; Nigeria	5383	Oluchi Elechi; Nigeria	5320	Nacèra Zaaboub; Algeria	5253

== Medal table ==
Rank	Nation	Gold	Silver	Bronze	Total
1	Nigeria (NGR)	13	16	9	38
2	Kenya (KEN)	12	10	7	29
3	Ethiopia (ETH)	4	3	4	11
4	Algeria (ALG)	3	4	6	13
5	Egypt (EGY)	3	2	2	7
6	Ivory Coast (CIV)	2	1	2	5
7	Namibia (NAM)	2	0	1	3
8	Mauritius (MRI)	1	0	1	2
9	Mozambique (MOZ)	1	0	0	1
10	Ghana (GHA)	0	1	3	4
11	Senegal (SEN)	0	1	2	3
12	Lesotho (LES)	0	1	0	1
12	Seychelles (SEY)	0	1	0	1
12	Sierra Leone (SLE)	0	1	0	1
15	Madagascar (MAD)	0	0	2	2
16	Tanzania (TAN)	0	0	1	1
16	Uganda (UGA)	0	0	1	1
Totals (17 entries)		41	41	41	123

== See also ==
- 1991 in athletics (track and field)
