= 1990 World Junior Championships in Athletics – Women's 400 metres hurdles =

The women's 400 metres hurdles event at the 1990 World Junior Championships in Athletics was held in Plovdiv, Bulgaria, at Deveti Septemvri Stadium on 8, 9 and 10 August.

== Medalists ==
| Gold | Nelli Voronkova; Soviet Union |
| Silver | Marjana Lužar; Yugoslavia |
| Bronze | Omolade Akinremi; Nigeria |

== Results ==
=== Final ===
10 August

| Rank | Name | Nationality | Time | Notes |
|---|---|---|---|---|
| 1st place, gold medalist(s) | Nelli Voronkova | Soviet Union | 55.84 | |
| 2nd place, silver medalist(s) | Marjana Lužar | Yugoslavia | 56.74 | |
| 3rd place, bronze medalist(s) | Omolade Akinremi | Nigeria | 56.97 | |
| 4 | Carmen Nistor | Romania | 57.78 | |
| 5 | Carole Nelson | France | 57.98 | |
| 6 | Maria-João Valamatos | Portugal | 58.56 | |
| 7 | Irina Skvarchevskaya | Soviet Union | 58.57 | |
| 8 | Ane Skak | Denmark | 58.63 | |

=== Semifinals ===
9 August

==== Semifinal 1 ====
| Rank | Name | Nationality | Time | Notes |
|---|---|---|---|---|
| 1 | Nelli Voronkova | Soviet Union | 56.87 | Q |
| 2 | Marjana Lužar | Yugoslavia | 57.67 | Q |
| 3 | Maria-João Valamatos | Portugal | 58.12 | Q |
| 4 | Ane Skak | Denmark | 58.54 | Q |
| 5 | Winsome Cole | Jamaica | 59.18 | |
| 6 | Lydie Deniau | France | 59.45 | |
| 7 | Roslyn Mack | United States | 60.56 | |
| | Berit Junker | East Germany | DQ | |

==== Semifinal 2 ====
| Rank | Name | Nationality | Time | Notes |
|---|---|---|---|---|
| 1 | Omolade Akinremi | Nigeria | 57.26 | Q |
| 2 | Carmen Nistor | Romania | 57.83 | Q |
| 3 | Irina Skvarchevskaya | Soviet Union | 57.98 | Q |
| 4 | Carole Nelson | France | 58.12 | Q |
| 5 | Aleksandra Rus | Yugoslavia | 58.95 | |
| 6 | Silje Rasmussen | Norway | 59.68 | |
| 7 | Maria-José Valamatos | Portugal | 59.88 | |
| 8 | Anna Shattky | New Zealand | 62.23 | |

=== Heats ===
8 August

==== Heat 1 ====
| Rank | Name | Nationality | Time | Notes |
|---|---|---|---|---|
| 1 | Carmen Nistor | Romania | 58.33 | Q |
| 2 | Marjana Lužar | Yugoslavia | 58.77 | Q |
| 3 | Berit Junker | East Germany | 59.68 | Q |
| 4 | Stella Theocharous | Cyprus | 60.22 | |
| 5 | Julie Cote | Canada | 60.68 | |
| 6 | Ombretta Volpe | Italy | 61.09 | |
| 7 | Annette Cavanagh | Australia | 61.22 | |

==== Heat 2 ====
| Rank | Name | Nationality | Time | Notes |
|---|---|---|---|---|
| 1 | Irina Skvarchevskaya | Soviet Union | 59.60 | Q |
| 2 | Silje Rasmussen | Norway | 59.71 | Q |
| 3 | Winsome Cole | Jamaica | 59.73 | Q |
| 4 | Indira Hamilton | United States | 59.75 | |
| 5 | Lency Montelier | Cuba | 61.17 | |
| 6 | Stefka Mineva | Bulgaria | 61.65 | |
| 7 | Emanuela Baggiolini | Italy | 61.73 | |

==== Heat 3 ====
| Rank | Name | Nationality | Time | Notes |
|---|---|---|---|---|
| 1 | Nelli Voronkova | Soviet Union | 57.10 | Q |
| 2 | Omolade Akinremi | Nigeria | 57.74 | Q |
| 3 | Maria-João Valamatos | Portugal | 58.78 | Q |
| 4 | Roslyn Mack | United States | 58.89 | q |
| 5 | Lydie Deniau | France | 59.68 | q |
| 6 | Lisa Nicholson | Ireland | 59.88 | |
| 7 | Sonia Scown | New Zealand | 61.30 | |

==== Heat 4 ====
| Rank | Name | Nationality | Time | Notes |
|---|---|---|---|---|
| 1 | Carole Nelson | France | 58.91 | Q |
| 2 | Ane Skak | Denmark | 59.14 | Q |
| 3 | Aleksandra Rus | Yugoslavia | 59.40 | Q |
| 4 | Maria-José Valamatos | Portugal | 59.44 | q |
| 5 | Anna Shattky | New Zealand | 59.52 | q |
| 6 | Dana Valterová | Czechoslovakia | 59.85 | |
| 7 | Susan Smith | Ireland | 61.89 | |

== Participation ==
According to an unofficial count, 28 athletes from 20 countries participated in the event.

- Australia (1)
- Bulgaria (1)
- Canada (1)
- Cuba (1)
- Cyprus (1)
- Czechoslovakia (1)
- Denmark (1)
- East Germany (1)
- France (2)
- Ireland (2)
- Italy (2)
- Jamaica (1)
- New Zealand (2)
- Nigeria (1)
- Norway (1)
- Portugal (2)
- Romania (1)
- Soviet Union (2)
- United States (2)
- Yugoslavia (2)
