= Emily Odoemenam =

Nigerian sprinter

Personal information
- Nationality: Nigerian
- Born: 1975 c.
- Occupation: sprinter

Sport
- Country: Nigeria
Medal record
Women's athletics
Representing Nigeria
African Championships
Gold medal – first place	1993 Durban	4×400 m
Silver medal – second place	1990 Cairo	200 m
Silver medal – second place	1993 Durban	400 m
Silver medal – second place	1993 Durban	400 m
Bronze medal – third place	1990 Cairo	400 m

Emily Odoemenam (born c. 1975) is a Nigerian former sprinter. She competed in local and international competitions in athletics representing Nigeria. She won silver and bronze medals at the 1990 African Championships in Athletics and another silver at the 1993 African Championships in Athletics at 200 and 400 metres events. Emily also participated at the 1993 World Championships in Athletics – Women's 4 × 400 metres relay alongside Omolade Akinremi, Omotayo Akinremi and Olabisi Afolabi.

== Achievements ==
Year	Competition	Venue	Position	Event	Notes
Representing Nigeria
1990	African Championships	Cairo, Egypt	2nd	400 metres	22:59
1990	African Championships	Cairo, Egypt	3rd	400 metres	51:68
1993	African Championships	Durban, South Africa	2nd	400 m	22.53

== Personal bests ==
- 200 metres hurdles – 22:59 s (1990)
- 400 metres – 51.68 s (1990)

== See also ==
- Omotayo Akinremi
