= Kenya at the 1987 All-Africa Games =

- IOC code: KEN
- NOC: National Olympic Committee of Kenya

in Nairobi
- Medals Ranked 4th: Gold 22 Silver 25 Bronze 16 Total 63

All-Africa Games appearances (overview)
- 1965; 1973; 1978; 1987; 1991; 1995; 1999; 2003; 2007; 2011; 2015; 2019; 2023

Youth appearances
- 2010; 2014

Kenya participated in the 1987 All-Africa Games held in Nairobi at the Moi International Sports Centre in Kasarani. It participated with athletes in 14 sports and won 63 medals in total.

== Medal summary ==
=== Medal table ===
Sport	Gold	Silver	Bronze	Total
Athletics	13	18	12	43
Basketball	0	0	0	0
Boxing				
Field hockey	1	0	0	1
Football	0	1	0	1
Handball	0	1	0	1
Swimming	4	6	6	16
Table tennis				
Taekwondo	1	0	0	1
Tennis				
Volleyball	0	1	0	1
Total	22	25	16	63

==== Gold Medal ====
Medal	Name	Sport	Event	Date	Ref
Gold	Simon Kipkemboi	Athletics	Men's 200m		
Gold	Billy Konchellah	Athletics	Men's 800m		
Gold	Sisa Kirati	Athletics	Men's 1500m		
Gold	John Ngugi	Athletics	Men's 5000m		
Gold	Paul Kipkoech	Athletics	Men's 10000m		
Gold	Patrick Sang	Athletics	Men's 3000m steeplechase		
Gold	Francisca Chepkurui	Athletics	Women's 400m		
Gold	Selina Chirchir	Athletics	Women's 800m		
Gold	Selina Chirchir	Athletics	Women's 1500m		
Gold	Susan Sirma	Athletics	Women's 3000m		
Gold	Leah Malot	Athletics	Women's 5000m		
Gold	Elizabeth Olaba	Athletics	Women's shot put		
Gold	Agnetha Chelimo	Athletics	Women's 5000m track walk		
Gold	Kenya men's national field hockey team	Athletics	Women's 5000m track walk		
Gold	John Kariuki	Taekwondo	Men's flyweight		

==== Silver Medal ====
Medal	Name	Sport	Event	Date	Ref
Silver	David Kitur	Athletics	Men's 400m		
Silver	Stephen Marai	Athletics	Men's 800m		
Silver	Wilfred Kirochi	Athletics	Men's 1500m		
Silver	Kenya women's national volleyball team	Volleyball	Volleyball - Women		
Silver	Kenya national football team	Football	Football - Men		

==== Bronze Medal ====
Medal	Name	Sport	Event	Date	Ref
Bronze	Joseph Chesire	Athletics	Men's 1500m		
Bronze	Peter Koech	Athletics	Men's 5000m	July 21	
