= Marcel Winkler =

South African sprinter (born 1970)

Personal information
- Born: 29 October 1970 (age 55) Johannesburg, South Africa
- Height: 1.67 m (5 ft 6 in)
- Weight: 52 kg (115 lb)

Sport
- Country: South Africa
- Sport: Track and field
- Event(s): 60 m, 100 m, 200 m

Achievements and titles
- Personal best: 100 m: 11.16 (1990)
Medal record
Women's athletics
Representing South Africa
African Championships
| Gold medal – first place | 1992 Belle Vue Harel | 4×100 m |
| Silver medal – second place | 1992 Belle Vue Harel | 100 m |
| Silver medal – second place | 1992 Belle Vue Harel | 200 m |
| Silver medal – second place | 1992 Belle Vue Harel | 4×400 m |

Marcel Sylvia Winkler (born 29 October 1970) is a retired South African female sprinter who specialised in 100 metres and 200 metres. She won silver medals in both events at the 1992 African Championships in Mauritius, both times finishing behind compatriot Elinda Vorster. She also competed for South Africa in the 1992 Summer Olympics in Barcelona in 100 metres, without progressing to the final.

== International competitions ==
| Year | Competition | Venue | Position | Event | Notes |
Representing South Africa
| 1992 | African Championships | Belle Vue Maurel, Mauritius | 2nd | 100 m | 11.31 |
| 1992 | African Championships | Belle Vue Maurel, Mauritius | 2nd | 200 m | 23.60 |
| 1992 | Summer Olympics | Barcelona, Spain | 40th (q) | 100 m | 12.01 |
| 1993 | World Indoor Championships | Toronto, Canada | 19th (q) | 60 m | 7.46 (NR) |
