= Athletics at the 1994 Commonwealth Games – Women's 400 metres =

Women's 400 metres at the Commonwealth Games

The women's 400 metres event at the 1994 Commonwealth Games was held at the Centennial Stadium in Victoria, British Columbia.

== Medalists ==
Gold	Silver	Bronze
Cathy Freeman; Australia	Fatima Yusuf; Nigeria	Sandie Richards; Jamaica

== Results ==
=== Heats ===
Rank	Heat	Name	Nationality	Time	Notes
1	4	Sandie Richards	Jamaica	52.62	Q
2	3	Phylis Smith	England	52.83	Q
3	4	Olabisi Afolabi	Nigeria	52.90	Q
4	3	Fatima Yusuf	Nigeria	53.07	Q
5	1	Renee Poetschka	Australia	53.14	Q
6	4	Melanie Neef	Scotland	53.21	Q
7	1	Omolade Akinremi	Nigeria	53.29	Q
8	2	Cathy Freeman	Australia	53.37	Q
9	4	Tracy Goddard	England	53.55	q
10	3	Kylie Hanigan	Australia	53.58	Q
11	2	Revoli Campbell	Jamaica	53.66	Q
12	1	Mercy Addy	Ghana	53.74	Q
13	4	Adri de Jongh	South Africa	53.87	q
14	3	Stephanie McCann	Northern Ireland	53.91	q
15	2	Theodora Kyriakou	Cyprus	53.74	Q
16	1	Julia Sandiford	Barbados	54.17	q
17	2	Andrea Pinnock	Canada	54.47	
18	1	Alanna Yakiwchuck	Canada	54.53	
19	3	Ngozi Mwanamwambwa	Zambia	54.56	
20	3	Hellena Wrappah	Ghana	54.74	
21	3	Angela Joseph	Trinidad and Tobago	54.76	
22	2	Nabiama Salifu	Ghana	54.88	
23	1	Sandra Douglas	England	55.54	
24	2	Mary-Estelle Kapalu	Vanuatu	55.77	
25	2	Stephanie Llewellyn	Northern Ireland	56.97	
26	1	Sama Fornah	Sierra Leone	1:02.99	
	4	Dithapelo Molefi	Botswana	DNS	

=== Semifinals ===
Rank	Heat	Name	Nationality	Time	Notes
1	1	Sandie Richards	Jamaica	51.23	Q
2	1	Cathy Freeman	Australia	51.57	Q
3	2	Fatima Yusuf	Nigeria	52.03	Q
4	2	Phylis Smith	England	52.31	Q
5	2	Renee Poetschka	Australia	52.66	Q
6	1	Melanie Neef	Scotland	52.75	Q
7	1	Olabisi Afolabi	Nigeria	52.78	Q
8	2	Kylie Hanigan	Australia	52.87	Q
9	2	Revoli Campbell	Jamaica	53.15	
10	1	Omolade Akinremi	Nigeria	53.20	
11	1	Theodora Kyriakou	Cyprus	53.80	
12	1	Tracy Goddard	England	53.84	
13	2	Stephanie McCann	Northern Ireland	53.96	
14	2	Adri de Jongh	South Africa	54.01	
15	2	Mercy Addy	Ghana	54.01	
16	1	Julia Sandiford	Barbados	54.61	

=== Final ===
Rank	Lane	Name	Nationality	Time	Notes
1st place, gold medalist(s)	3	Cathy Freeman	Australia	50.38	
2nd place, silver medalist(s)	4	Fatima Yusuf	Nigeria	50.53	
3rd place, bronze medalist(s)	5	Sandie Richards	Jamaica	50.69	
4	6	Phylis Smith	England	51.46	
5	8	Renee Poetschka	Australia	51.51	
6	7	Melanie Neef	Scotland	52.09	
7	1	Olabisi Afolabi	Nigeria	52.21	
8	2	Kylie Hanigan	Australia	52.55	
