= Athletics at the 1995 All-Africa Games =

Aspect of the 1995 All-Africa Games

Athletics at the VI All-Africa Games
- Dates: 13–23 September 1995
- Host city: Harare, Zimbabwe

The sixth All-Africa Games were held in September 1995 in Harare, Zimbabwe. As the track is at an altitude of 1473 metres all performances are considered to be set at altitude, this is believed to assist events up to 400 metres and in the long jump and triple jump. However, for events beyond 800 metres the thinner air is believed to have a detrimental effect on performances.

== Medal summary ==
=== Men's events ===
| Event | Gold | | Silver | | Bronze | |
|---|---|---|---|---|---|---|
| 100 metres (wind: -1.7 m/s) | Davidson Ezinwa; Nigeria | 10.24 | Emmanuel Tuffour; Ghana | 10.28 | Osmond Ezinwa; Nigeria | 10.31 |
| 200 metres | Sunday Bada; Nigeria | 20.28 =GR | Emmanuel Tuffour; Ghana | 20.29 | Joseph Gikonyo; Kenya | 20.80 |
| 400 metres | Samson Kitur; Kenya | 44.36 | Sunday Bada; Nigeria | 45.03 | Jude Monye; Nigeria | 45.17 |
| 800 metres | Arthémon Hatungimana; Burundi | 1:47.42 | Vincent Malakwen; Kenya | 1:47.43 | Savieri Ngidhi; Zimbabwe | 1:47.61 |
| 1500 metres | Vincent Malakwen; Kenya | 3:40.11 | Reuben Chesang; Kenya | 3:40.66 | Julius Achon; Uganda | 3:40.83 |
| 5000 metres | Josphat Machuka; Kenya | 13:31.11 GR | Habte Jifar; Ethiopia | 13:45.11 | Ayele Mezgebu; Ethiopia | 13:46.02 |
| 10000 metres | Josphat Machuka; Kenya | 28:03.6 | Habte Jifar; Ethiopia | 28:26.3 | Paul Koech; Kenya | 28:28.8 |
| Marathon | Nicolas Nyengerai; Zimbabwe | 2:20:08 | Honest Mutsairo; Zimbabwe | 2:20:15 | Simon Mrashani; Tanzania | 2:20:21 |
| 3000 metre steeplechase | Bernard Barmasai; Kenya | 8:27.15 | Gideon Chirchir; Kenya | 8:29.17 | Eliud Barngetuny; Kenya | 8:34.57 |
| 110 metres hurdles | William Erese; Nigeria | 13.73 GR | Kehinde Aladefa; Nigeria | 13.79 | Moses Oyiki; Nigeria | 13.84 |
| 400 metres hurdles | Ibou Faye; Senegal | 49.12 | Gideon Biwott; Kenya | 49.19 | Julius Masvanhise; Zimbabwe | 49.86 |
| 4 × 100 metres relay | Ghana; Ibrahim Hassan; Ahmed Ali; Emmanuel Tuffour; Eric Nkansah | 39.12 | Sierra Leone; Sanusi Turay; Pierre Lisk; Joselyn Thomas; Josephus Thomas | 39.51 | Ivory Coast; Jean-Olivier Zirignon; Franck Waota; Éric Pacôme N'Dri; Ibrahim Meité | 39.61 |
| 4 × 400 metres relay | Nigeria; Benedict Ukwuloye; Kunle Adejuyigbe; Jude Monye; Sunday Bada | 3:01.63 | Kenya; Hezron Maina; Gideon Biwott; Kennedy Oyunge; Samson Kitur | 3:03.11 | South Africa; Bobang Phiri; Hezekiel Sepeng; Alfred Visagie; Johan Steynberg | 3:03.65 |
| 20 kilometre road walk | Chris Britz; South Africa | 1:28:06 GR | David Kimutai; Kenya | 1:31:02 | Shemsu Hassan; Ethiopia | 1:32:03 |
| High jump | Pierre Vorster; South Africa | 2.22 GR | Anthony Idiata; Nigeria; Khemraj Naiko; Mauritius | 2.19 | | |
| Pole vault | Okkert Brits; South Africa | 5.50 GR | Kersley Gardenne; Mauritius | 5.20 | Sameh Hassan Farid; Egypt; Rafik Mefti; Algeria | 4.80 |
| Long jump | Cheikh Touré; Senegal | 8.10 | Andrew Owusu; Ghana | 8.01 | Jacob Katonon; Kenya | 7.80 |
| Triple jump | Jacob Katonon; Kenya | 16.93 | Mohamed Karim Sassi; Tunisia | 16.75 | Ndabazinhle Mdhlongwa; Zimbabwe | 16.60 |
| Shot put | Henk Booysen; South Africa | 18.80 | Chima Ugwu; Nigeria | 18.55 | Jaco Snyman; South Africa | 18.44 |
| Discus throw | Adewale Olukoju; Nigeria | 61.68 GR | Mickael Conjungo; Central African Republic | 58.94 | Frits Potgieter; South Africa | 58.54 |
| Hammer throw | Hakim Toumi; Algeria | 67.12 | Sherif Farouk El Hennawi; Egypt | 66.68 | Mohamed Karim Horchani; Tunisia | 65.78 |
| Javelin throw | Pius Bazighe; Nigeria | 77.56 GR | Phillip Spies; South Africa | 76.24 | Louis Fouché; South Africa | 75.04 |
| Decathlon | Danie van Wyk; South Africa | 7339 | Anis Riahi; Tunisia | 7165 | Sid Ali Sabour; Algeria | 6986 |

=== Women's events ===
| Event | Gold | | Silver | | Bronze | |
|---|---|---|---|---|---|---|
| 100 metres | Mary Onyali; Nigeria | 11.18 | Christy Opara-Thompson; Nigeria | 11.35 | Mary Tombiri; Nigeria | 11.40 |
| 200 metres | Mary Onyali; Nigeria | 22.75 | Calister Uba; Nigeria | 23.42 | Kate Iheagwam; Nigeria | 23.77 |
| 400 metres | Fatima Yusuf; Nigeria | 49.43 | Falilat Ogunkoya; Nigeria | 50.31 | Olabisi Afolabi; Nigeria | 51.53 |
| 800 metres | Maria de Lurdes Mutola; Mozambique | 1:56.99 | Tina Paulino; Mozambique | 2:01.07 | Kutre Dulecha; Ethiopia | 2:02.26 |
| 1500 metres | Kutre Dulecha; Ethiopia | 4:18.32 | Julia Sakara; Zimbabwe | 4:21.10 | Genet Gebregiorgis; Ethiopia | 4:21.94 |
| 5000 metres | Rose Cheruiyot; Kenya | 15:37.9 | Ayelech Worku; Ethiopia | 15:48.3 | Lydia Cheromei; Kenya | 15:52.6 |
| 10000 metres | Sally Barsosio; Kenya | 32:22.26 | Delillah Asiago; Kenya | 32:56.12 | Gete Wami; Ethiopia | 33:17.96 |
| Marathon | Jowaine Parrott; South Africa | 2:55:09 | Emebet Abosa; Ethiopia | 3:01:53 | Elfenesh Alemu; Ethiopia | 3:08:43 |
| 100 metres hurdles | Taiwo Aladefa; Nigeria | 12.98 | Angela Atede; Nigeria | 13.01 | Ime Akpan; Nigeria | 13.09 |
| 400 metres hurdles | Omolade Akinremi; Nigeria | 56.1 | Karen van der Veen; South Africa | 57.0 | Lana Uys; South Africa | 57.6 |
| 4 × 100 metres relay | Nigeria; Faith Idehen; Mary Onyali-Omagbemi; Christy Opara-Thompson; Mary Tombiri | 43.43 | Ghana; Mercy Addy; Vida Nsiah; Gladys Kotei; Helena Wrappah | 44.44 | Zimbabwe; Delia Mawoko; Gailey Dube; Simangale Ncube; Philipah Chidziva | 45.74 |
| 4 × 400 metres relay | Nigeria; Omolade Akinremi; Caroline Avbovbede; Saidat Onanuga; Fatima Yusuf | 3:27.51 | South Africa; Marie-Louise Henning; Adri van der Merwe; Lana Uys; Karen van der Veen | 3:33.68 | Ghana; Mercy Addy; Vida Nsiah; Amidatu Adrahmani; Agnes Yaa Nuamah | 3:35.67 |
| 5000 metre track walk | Dounia Kara; Algeria | 23:59.4 | Nagwa Ibrahim Ali; Egypt | 24:25.3 | Gete Komar; Ethiopia | 24:25.7 |
| High jump | Hestrie Storbeck; South Africa | 1.85 | Irène Tiendrébéogo; Burkina Faso | 1.75 | Madeleine Joubert; Namibia | 1.70 |
| Long jump | Eunice Barber; Sierra Leone | 6.70w | Sanet Fouché; South Africa | 6.45 | Patience Itanyi; Nigeria | 6.39 |
| Triple jump | Rosa Collins-Okah; Nigeria | 13.80 | Abiola Williams; Nigeria | 13.12 | Eunice Basweti; Kenya | 12.86 |
| Shot put | Hanan Ahmed Khaled; Egypt | 15.29 | Wafa Ismail El Baghdadi; Egypt | 14.76 | Beatrix Steenberg; South Africa | 14.71 |
| Discus throw | Monia Kari; Tunisia | 54.26 | Rhona Dwinger; South Africa | 49.84 | Caroline Fournier; Mauritius | 45.12 |
| Javelin throw | Rhona Dwinger; South Africa | 55.98 | Fatma Zouhour Toumi; Tunisia | 50.04 | Bernadette Perrine; Mauritius | 48.98 |
| Heptathlon | Oluchi Elechi; Nigeria | 5609 | Maralize Visser; South Africa | 5436 | Caroline Kola; Kenya | 5248 |

== Medal table ==
| Rank | Nation | Gold | Silver | Bronze | Total |
|---|---|---|---|---|---|
| 1 | Nigeria (NGR) | 15 | 9 | 8 | 32 |
| 2 | Kenya (KEN) | 8 | 7 | 7 | 22 |
| 3 | South Africa (SAF) | 8 | 6 | 6 | 20 |
| 4 | Algeria (ALG) | 2 | 0 | 2 | 4 |
| 5 | Senegal (SEN) | 2 | 0 | 0 | 2 |
| 6 | Ethiopia (ETH) | 1 | 4 | 7 | 12 |
| 7 | Ghana (GHA) | 1 | 4 | 1 | 6 |
| 8 | Egypt (EGY) | 1 | 3 | 1 | 5 |
| 8 | Tunisia (TUN) | 1 | 3 | 1 | 5 |
| 10 | Zimbabwe (ZIM) | 1 | 2 | 4 | 7 |
| 11 | Mozambique (MOZ) | 1 | 1 | 0 | 2 |
| 11 | Sierra Leone (SLE) | 1 | 1 | 0 | 2 |
| 13 | Burundi (BDI) | 1 | 0 | 0 | 1 |
| 14 | Mauritius (MRI) | 0 | 1 | 2 | 3 |
| 15 | Burkina Faso (BUR) | 0 | 1 | 0 | 1 |
| 16 | Ivory Coast (CIV) | 0 | 0 | 1 | 1 |
| 16 | Namibia (NAM) | 0 | 0 | 1 | 1 |
| 16 | Tanzania (TAN) | 0 | 0 | 1 | 1 |
| 16 | Uganda (UGA) | 0 | 0 | 1 | 1 |
| Totals (19 entries) | | 43 | 42 | 43 | 128 |
