= Athletics at the 1994 Commonwealth Games – Women's 4 × 400 metres relay =

Women's 4 × 400 metres relay at the Commonwealth Games

The women's 4 × 400 metres relay event at the 1994 Commonwealth Games was held on 28 August at the Centennial Stadium in Victoria, British Columbia.

== Results ==
Rank	Nation	Athletes	Time	Notes
1st place, gold medalist(s)	England	Phylis Smith, Tracy Goddard, Linda Keough, Sally Gunnell	3:27.06	GR
2nd place, silver medalist(s)	Jamaica	Revoli Campbell, Deon Hemmings, Inez Turner, Sandie Richards	3:27.63	
3rd place, bronze medalist(s)	Canada	Alanna Yakiwchuck, Stacey Bowen, Donalda Duprey, Charmaine Crooks	3:32.52	
4	Ghana	Hellena Wrappah, Agnes Nuamah, Gifty Abankwa, Mercy Addy	3:47.49	
	Australia	Lee Naylor, Kylie Hanigan, Renee Poetschka, Cathy Freeman	DQ	
	Nigeria	Olabisi Afolabi, Omolade Akinremi, Emily Odomelan, Fatima Yusuf	DQ	

The Australian team originally won in 3:26.84 but were later disqualified for obstructing the Nigerians on the final leg.
