= Alanna Yakiwchuk =

Canadian sprinter (born 1965)

Personal information
- Born: 17 April 1965 (age 61)

Sport
- Country: Canada
- Sport: Athletics
- Events: 400 metres 800 metres

Achievements and titles
- Personal bests: 400 m: 52.67 (1992); 800 m: 2:05.56 (1994)
Medal record
Women's athletics
Representing Canada
World Indoor Championships
| Silver medal – second place | 1993 Toronto | Medley relay |
Commonwealth Games
| Bronze medal – third place | 1994 Victoria | 4 × 400 m |
Francophone Games
| Gold medal – first place | 1994 Paris | 4 × 400 m relay |
| Bronze medal – third place | 1994 Paris | 800 m |

Alanna Yakiwchuk-Hinrichsen (born 17 April 1965) is a Canadian former sprinter and middle-distance runner. Considered a late bloomer, she won multiple U Sports championship titles for the Manitoba Bisons track and field team. After winning a silver medal in the medley relay at the 1993 IAAF World Indoor Championships, she won medals in the 4 × 400 metres relay at the 1994 Commonwealth Games and Francophone Games, also winning an individual 800 metres medal at the 1994 Francophone Games. After working in the sports industry and as a coach in the 2000s, she moved to Australia.

== Career ==
Though Yakiwchuk did not get "seriously involved" with the sport until 1990 in college, she competed as a prep for Garden City Collegiate in the Manitoba High Schools Athletics Association. At the 1981 Manitoba Indoor Games, Yakiwchuk was 3rd in the long jump in the high school division.

Before the 1983 indoor season, Yakiwchuk cracked her neck and suffered from muscle tears. Her eventual goal was to qualify for the Canada Summer Games.

In 1984, Yakiwchuk representing the Winnipeg Flying M Track Club at the Knights of Columbus Indoor Games. She placed 3rd in the 60 metres.

Yakiwchuk was runner-up in the 200 m at the 1986 Saskatchewan provincial championships behind Lisa Kroll. She also won the 400 m at the 1986 Prairie Track and Field Championships, although the event was uncontested due to withdrawals.

Yakiwchuk competed in the 400 m at the 1989 Francophone Games, advancing past the heats but not making the finals. She later said of the Games, "Eighty per cent of the team got dysentery and we were sicker than everything. It was just hell". She competed in the 100 m at the 1989 Canadian Track and Field Championships but was disqualified.

Yakiwchuk was originally made the Manitoba Bisons track and field team as a long jumper, but switched to sprinting. Competing collegiately in 1990, her rival was France Gareau of York University as they were ranked 1-2 in the country. She ran 38.16 seconds over 300 metres, 1.07 seconds off Angella Taylor-Issajenko's world record. In June 1990, Yakiwchuk set a 400 m personal best time of 53.62 seconds to win a Canada-Wales-Northern Ireland triangular meet.

Yakiwchuk was named to the Canadian 400 m and 4 × 400 m team at the 1991 Pan American Games, but she was not selected to the relay after placing 8th at the Canadian Track and Field Championships. In the individual 400 m, she was 6th in her semi-final and did not advance.

In her final year of collegiate eligibility, Yakiwchuk won three events at the 1992 U Sports Indoor Track and Field Championships. Her victories in the 300 m, 600 m, and 4 × 400 m and 2nd-place in the 4 × 200 m contributed to the University of Manitoba's runner-up team finish. She was selected as her school's Outstanding Woman Athlete for the 1991-92 season. During her career, she set school indoor records for the 300 m and 600 m. Before July 1992, Yakiwchuk ran a 400 metres personal best of 52.67 seconds.

After graduation, Yakiwchuk began to concentrate specifically on the 400 metres rather than splitting her time between different distances to score team points. She placed 2nd in the 400 m and 4th in the 200 m at the 1993 Canadian Indoor Track and Field Championships, placing her on the Canadian relay teams at the 1993 IAAF World Indoor Championships.

In the 4 × 400 m relay, Yakiwchuk ran third leg for Canada. Her team initially finished 4th behind Russia, Jamaica, and the United States, however they were disqualified for the leadoff runner Rosey Edeh stepping out of her lane. Russia was also later disqualified for doping. In the separate sprint medley relay exhibition event, Yakiwchuk anchored the Canadian team with a 55.0 400 m split, finishing in 3rd place before Russia was again disqualified for doping bumping her position to 2nd.

Outdoors, Yakiwchuk was named to the 400 m and 4 × 400 m relay teams at the 1993 World University Games. She qualified for the 400 m finals and finished 7th before her relay team finished 4th overall.

In 1994, Yakiwchuk represented the Winnipeg Raiders club. She competed again in the 1994 Francophone Games, winning the gold medal in the 4 × 400 m and earning a bronze medal in the middle-distance 800 metres event. It was her first international 800 m race, and her time of 2:05.56 was a personal best. Following her bronze medal, Yakiwchuk prepared to move to the 800 m permanently.

Following 1994 Canadian nationals, Yakiwchuk suffered from a viral infection that impacted her training. She qualified for the Canadian team at the 1994 Commonwealth Games in both the 400 m and the 4 × 400 m relay. She was expected to make the 400 m semi-finals if she ran to potential, but she finished 5th in her heat and did not advance. In the relay, she ran third leg in the finals and her team won the bronze medal behind England and Jamaica. Their original placing was 5th, but winners Australia were disqualified for obstructing Nigeria on the final leg, and 4th-placers Nigeria were disqualified for a bad exchange. For a short period of time England was also disqualified due to their uniforms, placing Yakiwchuk in silver position, but England was later reinstated. Due to the disqualifications the Canadians didn't get to experience a medal ceremony.

Yakiwchuk represented Echo Athletic club in 1995. She was runner-up in the 400 m at the 1995 Canadian Indoor Track and Field Championships. She was considered to have a shot at qualifying for the 1995 World Championships in Athletics, but she did not compete. She tore her Achilles tendon during the 1995 season, an injury later described as beginning the "downfall of her career".

Yakiwchuk struggled financially in 1996 and did not make the 1996 Canadian Olympic team. She was 5th in the 800 m at the 1997 Canadian Outdoor Track and Field Championships, running 2:07.90. She appeared on Manitoba's Channel 11 as a sports coordinator commentating on the Pan American Games.

Yakiwchuk participated in a non-profit organization named Team With A Dream to fund her preparations for the 1999 Pan American Games. However, she didn't compete in the Games.

== Personal life ==
Yakiwchuk was born on 17 April 1965 and was one of six siblings. She attended Garden City Collegiate in Winnipeg, Manitoba, Canada. She then attended the University of Manitoba, where she earned degrees in physical education and education. She was coached by Alex Gardiner in college. Following graduation, she worked as a substitute teacher.

While an athlete, Yakiwchuk spent more than CAD$15,000 per year on equipment, travel, and physiotherapy. Following her 1995 injury, Yakiwchuk was a consultant for Sport Manitoba. In 1996, she worked on special projects for Sport Manitoba, and she worked for both the 1999 Pan American Games and the 2000 Summer Olympics. She was general manager of Coaching Manitoba, Inc. in 2000. In September 2000, Yakiwchuk was one of several athletes to carry the Olympic torch for the 2000 Summer Paralympics.

She met her husband Grant Hinrichsen, an assistant housemaster at Kinross Wolaroi School, Orange, New South Wales, at the 2000 Sydney Olympics. Her husband moved with her to Canada where they had two children. Under the name Alanna Hinrichsen, she was a coach of the Manitoba Bisons track and field team in the 2000s. In 2016, Yakiwchuk was inducted into the Manitoba High Schools Athletics Association hall of fame.

In 2017, Yakiwchuk moved to Orange, New South Wales, Australia, working as a project manager for Western NSW Health.
