= Xu Bin (disambiguation) =

Xu Bin is a Chinese-born Singaporean actor.

Xu Bin may also refer to:

- Xu Bin (footballer), a Chinese footballer
- Xu Bin, born 1989, a Chinese footballer who participated 2020 China League Two
- Xu Bin, an athlete and competitor in Athletics at the 1991 Summer Universiade – Men's long jump and Athletics at the 1995 Summer Universiade – Men's long jump
- Xu Bin, a character in Ming Dynasty (2019 TV series)
- Xu Bin, chairman of the Shide Group and brother of Xu Ming
