= Aladefa =

Aladefa is a Yoruba surname. Notable people with the surname include:

- Ayodele Aladefa (1970–2017), Nigerian long jumper
- Kehinde Aladefa (born 1974), Nigerian hurdler
- Taiwo Aladefa (born 1974), Nigerian hurdler, sister of Kehinde
