= Athletics at the 1994 Commonwealth Games – Men's long jump =

Men's long jump at the Commonwealth Games

The men's long jump event at the 1994 Commonwealth Games was held on 24 and 26 August at the Centennial Stadium in Victoria, British Columbia.

== Medalists ==
Gold	Silver	Bronze
Obinna Eregbu; Nigeria	Dave Culbert; Australia	Ian James; Canada

== Results ==
=== Qualification ===
Qualification: Qualifying Performance 7.95 (Q) or 12 best performers (q) advance to the Final.

Rank	Group	Name	Nationality	#1	#2	#3	Result	Notes
1	A	Obinna Eregbu	Nigeria	x	8.22		8.22	Q, GR
2	A	Jai Taurima	Australia				7.88	q
3	A	Benjamin Koech	Kenya				7.85	q
4	A	Fred Salle	England	7.85			7.85	q
5	A	Andrew Owusu	Ghana				7.84	q
6	B	Dave Culbert	Australia				7.81	q
7	B	Ian James	Canada				7.79	q
8	B	Ayodele Aladefa	Nigeria				7.74	q
9	B	Craig Hepburn	Bahamas				7.68	q
10	A	Brian Thomas	Canada				7.67	q
11	B	Ron Chambers	Jamaica				7.64	q
12	B	Jérôme Romain	Dominica				7.63	q
13	B	James Sabulei	Kenya				7.56	
14	B	Barrington Williams	England	7.53	7.48	7.22	7.53	
15	B	Ralston Varlack	British Virgin Islands				7.51	
16	B	Ryan Moore	Australia				7.47	
17	A	Mohammed Zaki Sadri	Malaysia				7.46	
18	A	Duncan Mathieson	Scotland				7.36	
19	B	François Fouché	South Africa				7.34	
20	A	Keita Cline	British Virgin Islands				7.27	
21	A	Wendell Williams	Trinidad and Tobago				7.25	
22	A	Trevino Betty	Canada				7.16	
23	B	Darius Okello-Bua	Uganda				7.03	
24	B	Tevita Fauonuku	Tonga				6.95	
25	B	Thomas Ganda	Sierra Leone				6.91	
26	A	Dexter Browne	Saint Vincent and the Grenadines				6.82	
27	A	Elston Shaw	Belize				6.78	
28	A	Lloyd Phipps-Browne	Saint Kitts and Nevis				6.74	
29	A	Demigo Kapal	Brunei				6.68	
30	B	Leopold Lamb	Belize				6.42	
31	B	Danny Beauchamp	Seychelles				5.22	
	A	Steve Ingraham	Wales				NM	
		Robert Foster	Jamaica				DNS	
		Leon Gordon	Jamaica				DNS	
		Vissen Mooneegan	Mauritius				DNS	
		John MacKenzie	Scotland				DNS	
		Ndabazinhle Mdhlongwa	Zimbabwe				DNS	

=== Final ===
Rank	Name	Nationality	#1	#2	#3	#4	#5	#6	Result	Notes
1st place, gold medalist(s)	Obinna Eregbu	Nigeria	8.05	7.91	–	x	x		8.05	
2nd place, silver medalist(s)	Dave Culbert	Australia	7.87	7.69	x	8.00			8.00	
3rd place, bronze medalist(s)	Ian James	Canada	7.82	7.82				7.93	7.93	
4	Ayodele Aladefa	Nigeria						7.93	7.93	
5	Fred Salle	England	7.87	x	7.67	7.67	7.88	7.63	7.88	
6	Jai Taurima	Australia	7.87	x					7.87	
7	Jérôme Romain	Dominica							7.69	
8	Craig Hepburn	Bahamas							7.65	
9	Benjamin Koech	Kenya							7.62	
10	Brian Thomas	Canada	x						7.59	
11	Ron Chambers	Jamaica							7.53	
12	Andrew Owusu	Ghana							7.36	
