= Athletics at the 1993 Summer Universiade – Women's 400 metres =

The women's 400 metres event at the 1993 Summer Universiade was held at the UB Stadium in Buffalo, United States on 16 and 17 July 1993.

== Medalists ==
Gold	Silver	Bronze
Michelle Collins; United States	Youlanda Warren; United States	Nancy McLeón; Cuba

== Results ==
=== Heats ===
Rank	Heat	Athlete	Nationality	Time	Notes
1	2	Nancy McLeón	Cuba	53.36	Q
2	1	Michelle Collins	United States	54.65	Q
3	2	Mireille Sankaatsing	Suriname	54.69	Q
4	3	Youlanda Warren	United States	54.70	Q
5	3	Omotayo Akinremi	Nigeria	54.80	Q
6	2	Alanna Yakiwchuk	Canada	54.92	q
7	1	Judy Fraser	Canada	55.08	Q
8	3	Shelly Beckford	Jamaica	55.30	q
9	2	Marina Filipović	Independent Participants	55.35	
10	2	Claire Raven	Great Britain	55.48	
11	1	Natália Moura	Portugal	55.66	
12	1	Emma Nicholson	Ireland	55.70	
13	2	Yolanda Reyes	Spain	55.75	
14	2	Melrose Mansaray	Sierra Leone	56.29	
15	3	Cristina Regalo	Portugal	56.67	
16	3	K. Mathews Beenamol	India	57.87	
17	1	Adelisa Díaz	Puerto Rico	59.22	
18	3	Liu Shu-hua	Chinese Taipei	1:01.16	
19	1	Grace Batson	Guyana	1:03.02	

=== Final ===
Rank	Lane	Athlete	Nationality	Time	Notes
1st place, gold medalist(s)	6	Michelle Collins	United States	52.01	
2nd place, silver medalist(s)	4	Youlanda Warren	United States	52.18	
3rd place, bronze medalist(s)	5	Nancy McLeón	Cuba	52.84	
4	1	Omotayo Akinremi	Nigeria	53.35	
5	2	Shelly Beckford	Jamaica	54.84	
6	3	Mireille Sankaatsing	Suriname	54.87	
7	8	Alanna Yakiwchuk	Canada	55.18	
8	7	Judy Fraser	Canada	55.23	
