= Ron Chambers =

Jamaican long jumper (born 1958)

Personal information
- Born: 5 October 1958 (age 67)

Sport
- Sport: Track and field
Medal record
Representing Jamaica
Central American and Caribbean Games
Bronze medal – third place	1978 Medellin	Long jump

Ron Chambers (born 5 October 1958) is a retired Jamaican long jumper.

He won the bronze medal at the 1978 Central American and Caribbean Games, the silver medal at the 1991 Central American and Caribbean Championships, finished fifth at the 1991 Pan American Games and 11th at the 1994 Commonwealth Games.

He became Jamaican champion in 1991 and 1994, and also triple jump champion in 1992. His personal best jump was 8.18 metres, achieved in April 1990 in Miami.
