= Henk Booysen =

South African shot putter

Medal record

Men's athletics

Representing South Africa

African Championships
Gold medal – first place	1996 Yaoundé	Shot put

Henk Booysen (born 1 November 1972) is a retired South African shot putter and javelin thrower.

In the shot put he won the gold medal at the 1995 All-Africa Games and the 1996 African Championships. In the javelin throw he finished fourth at the 1995 All-Africa Games.

His personal best put was 19.34 metres, achieved in April 1995 in Pietersburg.
