= Victor Omagbemi =

Nigerian sprinter

Personal information
- Born: 22 May 1967 (age 59) Abuja, Nigeria

Sport
- Sport: Track and field
Medal record
Representing Nigeria
African Championships
Gold medal – first place	1992 Belle Vue Harel	100 m
Gold medal – first place	1992 Belle Vue Harel	200 m
Silver medal – second place	1993 Durban	4×100 m relay
Bronze medal – third place	1992 Belle Vue Harel	4×100 m relay
African Games
Gold medal – first place	1991 Cairo	4x100 m relay

Victor Tunde Omagbemi (born 22 May 1967) is a retired Nigerian sprinter. He won both the 100 and 200 metres at the 1992 African Championships.

Omagbemi finished fourth in 4 x 100 metres relay at the 1991 World Championships with teammates George Ogbeide, Olapade Adeniken and Davidson Ezinwa.

He was married to Mary Onyali-Omagbemi. Currently married to Quasheba Lee-Omagbemi. He has five children, Tia, Maudejanei' (Maudejanei' Alero), Ivan, Jaide and Lea Omagbemi.
