= Karen Botha =

South African long jumper

Personal information
- Nationality: South African
- Born: Karen Kruger; 17 January 1967 (age 59) Bethal, Transvaal, Union of South Africa
- Height: 162 cm (5 ft 4 in)
- Weight: 58 kg (128 lb)
- Spouse: Naas Botha
- Children: 3

Sport
- Sport: Athletics
- Event: Long jump
Medal record
Women's athletics
Representing South Africa
African Championships
Gold medal – first place	1992 Belle Vue Harel	4×100 m
Gold medal – first place	1992 Belle Vue Harel	Long jump

Karen Botha, née Kruger (born 17 January 1967) is a South African athlete. She competed in the women's long jump at the 1992 Summer Olympics.

== Personal life ==
She married Naas Botha in 1991. They have three children.

She has Crohn's disease.
