= Athletics at the 1987 All-Africa Games =

Athletics at the IV All-Africa Games
- Dates: 7–12 August
- Host city: Nairobi, Kenya

The fourth All-Africa Games were held in August 1987 in Nairobi, Kenya.

Four new events were added to the games these were the women's 3000 metres, 10000 metres, 400 metres hurdles and 5000 metres track walk. Additionally the pentathlon for women was replaced with the heptathlon. Also four nations won medals for the first time in athletics at the All-Africa Games. These were Mauritius, Rwanda, Burundi and Madagascar

== Medal summary ==
=== Men's events ===
Event	Gold		Silver		Bronze	
100 metres (wind: +2.4 m/s)	Chidi Imo; Nigeria	10.10w	Eric Akogyiram; Ghana	10.32w	Charles-Louis Seck; Senegal	10.33w
200 metres (wind: -1.6 m/s)	Simon Kipkemboi; Kenya	20.90	John Myles-Mills; Ghana	20.94	Eseme Ikpoto; Nigeria	21.01
400 metres	Innocent Egbunike; Nigeria	44.23 GR	David Kitur; Kenya	44.93	Moses Ugbusien; Nigeria	45.35
800 metres	Billy Konchellah; Kenya	1:45.99	Stephen Marai; Kenya	1:46.64	Dieudonné Kwizera; Burundi	1:46.69
1500 metres	Sisa Kirati; Kenya	3:39.40	Wilfred Kirochi; Kenya	3:39.66	Joseph Chesire; Kenya	3:39.84
5000 metres	John Ngugi; Kenya	13:31.87 GR	Paul Kipkoech; Kenya	13:36.32	Peter Koech; Kenya	13:44.94
10000 metres	Paul Kipkoech; Kenya	28:34.77	Abebe Mekonnen; Ethiopia	28:58.70	Some Muge; Kenya	28:59.96
Marathon	Belayneh Dinsamo; Ethiopia	2:14:47 GR	Dereje Nedi; Ethiopia	2:15:27	Kebede Balcha; Ethiopia	2:16:07
3000 metre steeplechase	Patrick Sang; Kenya	8:33.69	Joshua Kipkemboi; Kenya	8:45.94	Astère Havugiyarémye; Burundi	8:57.19
110 metres hurdles (wind: -0.9 m/s)	Judex Lefou; Mauritius	14.11	Gideon Yego; Kenya	14.24	René Djédjémel Mélédjé; Ivory Coast	14.30
400 metres hurdles	Amadou Dia Bâ; Senegal	48.03 GR	Shem Ochako; Kenya	48.97	Henry Amike; Nigeria	49.08
4 × 100 metres relay	Nigeria; Augustine Olobia; Patrick Nwankwo; Iziak Adeyanju; Chidi Imoh	39.06 GR	Kenya; Elkana Nyangau; Erick Keter; Simon Kipkemboi; John Shivanda	39.64	Senegal; Hamidou Diawara; Amadou M'Baye; Charles-Louis Seck; Mamadou Sène; Joseph Diaz	39.70
4 × 400 metres relay	Nigeria; Moses Ugbusien; Joseph Fallaye; Henry Amike; Innocent Egbunike; John Okoye	3:00.55 GR	Kenya; John Anzrah; Tito Sawe; Elkana Nyang'au; David Kitur	3:01.00	Burundi; Pierre-Claver Nyabenda; Cyprien Rugerinyange; Aloyse Nsazurwimo; Dieudonné Kwizera	3:06.91
20 kilometre road walk	Shemsu Hassan; Ethiopia	1:35:57 GR	William Sawe; Kenya	1:42:30	Mutisya Kilonzo; Kenya	1:43:04
High jump	Othmane Belfaa; Algeria	2.19 GR	Asmir Okoro; Nigeria	2.16	Paul Ngadjadoum; Chad	2.16
Pole vault	Choukri Abahnini; Tunisia	4.85	Abdelatif Chekir; Tunisia	4.75	Sami Si Mohamed; Algeria	4.70
Long jump	Paul Emordi; Nigeria	8.23	Yusuf Alli; Nigeria	8.18w	Joseph Kio; Nigeria	7.96
Triple jump	Francis Dodoo; Ghana	17.12 GR	Joseph Taiwo; Nigeria	16.90w	Toussaint Rabenala; Madagascar	16.35
Shot put	Adewale Olukoju; Nigeria	18.13	Martin Mélagne; Ivory Coast	17.89 (NR)	Ahmed Mohamed Ashoush; Egypt	17.85
Discus throw	Adewale Olukoju; Nigeria	56.50	Mohamed Naguib Hamed; Egypt	56.08	Hassan Ahmed Hamad; Egypt	55.84
Hammer throw	Hakim Toumi; Algeria	70.10 GR	Yacine Louail; Algeria	63.66	Ahmed Ibrahim Taha; Egypt	57.52
Javelin throw	Justin Arop; Uganda	73.42	Zakayo Malekwa; Tanzania	72.32	George Odera; Kenya	71.30
Decathlon	Ahmed Mahour Bacha; Algeria	7104	Mbanefo Akpom; Nigeria	6979	Geoffrey Seurey; Kenya	6918

=== Women's events ===
Event	Gold		Silver		Bronze	
100 metres (wind: -0.7 m/s)	Tina Iheagwam; Nigeria	11.32	Falilat Ogunkoya; Nigeria	11.43	Mary Onyali; Nigeria	11.47
200 metres (wind: -0.4 m/s)	Mary Onyali; Nigeria	22.66	Falilat Ogunkoya; Nigeria	22.95	Tina Iheagwam; Nigeria	23.56
400 metres	Francisca Chepkurui; Kenya	51.99	Geraldine Shitandayi; Kenya	52.07	Mercy Addy; Ghana	52.35
800 metres	Selina Chirchir; Kenya	2:03.22	Florence Wanjiru; Kenya	2:03.77	Mary Chemweno; Kenya	2:04.34
1500 metres	Selina Chirchir; Kenya	4:13.91	Susan Sirma; Kenya	4:14.12	Evelyn Adiru; Uganda	4:17.87
3000 metres	Susan Sirma; Kenya	9:19.20	Hellen Kimaiyo; Kenya	9:21.50	Nata Nangae; Tanzania	9:31.17
10000 metres	Leah Malot; Kenya	33:58.15	Marcianne Mukamurenzi; Rwanda	33:58.55	Mary Kirui; Kenya	34:12.21
100 metres hurdles	Maria Usifo; Nigeria	13.29	Dinah Yankey; Ghana	13.73	Nacèra Zaaboub; Algeria	13.80
400 metres hurdles	Maria Usifo; Nigeria	55.72	Rose Tata-Muya; Kenya	55.94	Zewde Haile Mariam; Ethiopia	57.60 (NR)
4 × 100 metres relay	Nigeria; Beatrice Utondu; Tina Iheagwam; Mary Onyali; Falilat Ogunkoya	43.44	Ghana; Mercy Addy; Martha Appiah; Cynthia Quartey; Dinah Yankey	44.43	Kenya; Geraldine Shitandayi; Ruth Waithera; Esther Kavaya; Jane Wanja	45.24 (NR)
4 × 400 metres relay	Nigeria; Maria Usifo; Airat Bakare; Falilat Ogunkoya; Mary Onyali	3:27.08	Kenya; Geraldine Shitandayi; Florence Wanjiru; Esther Kavaya; Francisca Chepkurui	3:28.94 (NR)	Uganda; Farida Kyakutema; Evelyn Adiru; Edith Nakiyingi; Grace Buzu	3:34.41 (NR)
5000 metre track walk	Agnetha Chelimo; Kenya	25:38.91	Valeria Ndaliro; Kenya	25:41.15	Monica Akoth; Kenya	26:03.35
High jump	Awa Dioum-Ndiaye; Senegal	1.80	Nacèra Zaaboub; Algeria	1.70	Constance Senghor; Senegal	1.73
Long jump	Beatrice Utondu; Nigeria	6.45	Comfort Igeh; Nigeria	6.19	Albertine Koutouan; Ivory Coast	6.05
Shot put	Elizabeth Olaba; Kenya	15.30	Aïcha Dahmous; Algeria	13.84	Martha Atieno; Kenya	12.81
Discus throw	Jeanne Ngo Minyemeck; Cameroon	46.20	Hanan Ahmed Khaled; Egypt	45.12	Aïcha Dahmous; Algeria	44.80
Javelin throw	Samia Djémaa; Algeria	53.30	Seraphina Nyauma; Kenya	51.60	Matilda Kisava; Tanzania	47.02
Heptathlon	Yasmina Azzizi; Algeria	5663	Nacèra Zaaboub; Algeria	5565	Frida Kiptala; Kenya	4939

== Medal table ==
Rank	Nation	Gold	Silver	Bronze	Total
1	Nigeria	14	7	6	27
2	Kenya	13	18	12	43
3	Algeria	5	4	3	12
4	Ethiopia	2	2	2	6
5	Senegal	2	0	3	5
6	Ghana	1	4	1	6
7	Tunisia	1	1	0	2
8	Uganda	1	0	2	3
9	Cameroon	1	0	0	1
9	Mauritius	1	0	0	1
11	Egypt	0	2	3	5
12	Ivory Coast	0	1	2	3
12	Tanzania	0	1	2	3
14	Rwanda	0	1	0	1
15	Burundi	0	0	3	3
16	Chad	0	0	1	1
16	Madagascar	0	0	1	1
Totals (17 entries)		41	41	41	123

== See also ==
- 1987 in athletics (track and field)
