= 1990 African Championships in Athletics =

- Dates: 3–6 October
- Host city: Cairo, Egypt

The 1990 African Championships in Athletics were held in Cairo, Egypt between 3 and 6 October.

== Medal summary ==
=== Men's events ===
Event	Gold		Silver		Bronze	
100 metres (wind: +0.1 m/s)	Joseph Gikonyo; Kenya	10.28	Abdullahi Tetengi; Nigeria	10.36	Charles-Louis Seck; Senegal	10.38
200 metres (wind: +0.5 m/s)	Joseph Gikonyo; Kenya	20.89	Abdullahi Tetengi; Nigeria	21.01	Sunday Bada; Nigeria	21.05
400 metres	Samson Kitur; Kenya	45.15	David Kitur; Kenya	46.13	Sunday Bada; Nigeria	46.19
800 metres	William Tanui; Kenya	1:46.80	Robert Kibet; Kenya	1:47.15	Desta Asgedom; Ethiopia	1:47.38
1500 metres	Moses Kiptanui; Kenya	3:39.51	Abdelaziz Sahere; Morocco	3:39.53	David Kibet; Kenya	3:41.49
5000 metres	Ezequeil Bitok; Kenya	13:33.30	Andrew Sambu; Tanzania	13:33.90	Mohamed Issangar; Morocco	13:34.37
10000 metres	Khalid Skah; Morocco	28:31.10	Andrew Sambu; Tanzania	28:31.50	Addis Abebe; Ethiopia	28:34.40
Marathon	Tesfaye Tafa; Ethiopia	2:33:38	Belaye Wolashe; Ethiopia	2:37:17	Negash Dube; Ethiopia	2:49:42
3000 metre steeplechase	Abdelaziz Sahere; Morocco	8:33.58	William Mutwol; Kenya	8:34.03	Bizuneh Yai Tura; Ethiopia	8:56.14
110 metre hurdles (wind: +0.4 m/s)	Moses Oyiki Orode; Nigeria	14.26	Gideon Yego; Kenya	14.39	Judex Lefou; Mauritius	14.42
400 metre hurdles	Hamidou Mbaye; Senegal	51.10	Ahmed Abdel Halim Ghanem; Egypt	51.16	Judex Lefou; Mauritius	51.41
4 × 100 metres relay	Nigeria; Nigeria; Nnamdi Anusim; Abdullah Tetengi; Michael Monye; Ebiyo Pupre	39.85	Senegal; Senegal; Joseph Diaz; Amadou M'Baye; Charles-Louis Seck; Mamadou Dione	40.05	Ivory Coast; Ivory Coast; Gilles Bogui; Ouattara Lagazane; Jean-Olivier Zirignon; Hyacinthe Kamelan	40.24
4 × 400 metres relay	Nigeria; Nigeria; Omokaro Alohan; Hassan Bosso; Abu Danjuma; Sunday Bada	3:04.77	Morocco; Morocco; Abdelali Kasbane; Benyounés Lahlou; Ali Dahhane; Abdelkader El Boukhari	3:05.89	Kenya; Kenya	3:06.88
20 kilometre road walk	Shemsu Hassan; Ethiopia	1:29:31	Abdelwahab Ferguène; Algeria	1:31:00	Andrew Eyapan; Kenya	1:32:24
High jump	Othmane Belfaa; Algeria	2.16	Samson Kebenei; Kenya	2.13	Khemraj Naiko; Mauritius	2.09
Pole vault	Ali Ziouani; Morocco	4.90	Kersley Gardenne; Mauritius	4.70	Sid Ali Sabour; Algeria	4.40
Long jump	Ayodele Aladefa; Nigeria	7.92	Badara Mbengue; Senegal	7.90	Amos Rutere; Kenya	7.55
Triple jump	Toussaint Rabenala; Madagascar	16.61	James Sabulei; Kenya	16.06	Papa Ladji Konaté; Senegal	15.81
Shot put	Robert Welikhe; Kenya	17.57	Ahmed Kamel Shata; Egypt	17.36	Mohamed Ismail Muslem; Egypt	16.50
Discus throw	Hassan Ahmed Hamad; Egypt	55.80	Dhia Kamel Ahmed; Egypt	52.74	Ikechukwu Chika; Nigeria	52.50
Hammer throw	Sherif Farouk El Hennawi; Egypt	69.60	Hassan Chahine; Morocco	66.98	Hakim Toumi; Algeria	66.34
Javelin throw	Fidèle Rakotonirina; Madagascar	69.50	Pius Bazighe; Nigeria	68.80	Justin Arop; Uganda	67.76
Decathlon	Abdennacer Moumen; Morocco	6983	Tommy Ozono; Nigeria	6869	Mourad Mahour Bacha; Algeria	6802

=== Women's events ===
Event	Gold		Silver		Bronze	
100 metres (wind: +0.6 m/s)	Onyinye Chikezie; Nigeria	11.56	Chioma Ajunwa; Nigeria	11.63	Mary Tombiri; Nigeria	11.74
200 metres (wind: +0.5 m/s)	Fatima Yusuf; Nigeria	23.19	Emily Odoemenam; Nigeria	23.59	Helena Amoako; Ghana	24.36
400 metres	Fatima Yusuf; Nigeria	50.85	Charity Opara; Nigeria	51.68	Emily Odoemenam; Nigeria	53.3
800 metres	Maria de Lurdes Mutola; Mozambique	2:13.54	Edith Nakiyingi; Uganda	2:14.00	Zewde Haile Mariam; Ethiopia	2:15.14
1500 metres	Maria de Lurdes Mutola; Mozambique	4:25.27	Edith Nakiyingi; Uganda	4:25.34	Margaret Ngotho; Kenya	4:27.14
3000 metres	Derartu Tulu; Ethiopia	9:11.21	Luchia Yishak; Ethiopia	9:15.99	Margaret Ngotho; Kenya	9:16.41
10,000 metres	Derartu Tulu; Ethiopia	33:37.82	Jane Ngotho; Kenya	33:39.26	Tigist Moreda; Ethiopia	34:24.67
100 metres hurdles (wind: -0.6 m/s)	Dinah Yankey; Ghana	13.55	Nezha Bidouane; Morocco	13.70	Mosun Adesina; Nigeria	13.85
400 metres hurdles	Nezha Bidouane; Morocco	57.17	Omolade Akinremi; Nigeria	57.97	Omotayo Akinremi; Nigeria	58.83
4 × 100 metres relay	Nigeria; Nigeria; Chioma Ajunwa; Onyinye Chikezie; Mary Tombiri; Fatima Yusuf	45.06	Ghana; Ghana; Philomena Mensah; Cynthia Quartey; Dinah Yankey; Helen Amoako	45.87	Egypt; Egypt; Karima Meskin Saad; Wafa Bashir; Huda Hashem Ismail; Muna Mohamed Mansour	46.79
4 × 400 metres relay	Nigeria; Nigeria; Omolade Akinremi; Omotayo Akinremi; Charity Opara; Fatima Yusuf	3:40.04	Kenya; Kenya; Rose Tata-Muya; Ruth Onsarigo; Isabella Mushilla; Selina Tanui	3:45.99	Mauritius; Mauritius; Christine Duverge; Sheila Seebaluck; Jane Thondojee; Gilliane Quirin	3:46.94
5000 metre track walk	Agnetha Chelimo; Kenya	25:45.20	Méryem Kouch; Morocco	26:36.70	Amani Mohamed Adel; Egypt	27:11.60
High jump	Lucienne N'Da; Ivory Coast	1.80	Stella Agbaegbu; Nigeria	1.77	Ifeanyi Aduba; Nigeria	1.68
Long jump	Chioma Ajunwa; Nigeria	6.13	Stella Emefesi; Nigeria	5.79	Nagwa Abd El Hay Riad; Egypt	5.71
Shot put	Hanan Ahmed Khaled; Egypt	15.21	Elizabeth Olaba; Kenya	14.26	Fouzia Fatihi; Morocco	14.12
Discus throw	Zoubida Laayouni; Morocco	53.10	Hanan Ahmed Khaled; Egypt	49.90	Elizabeth Olaba; Kenya	45.04
Javelin throw	Seraphina Nyauma; Kenya	46.82	Matilda Kisava; Tanzania	46.44	Kate Nwani; Nigeria	45.44
Heptathlon	Albertine Koutouan; Ivory Coast	5065	Howaida Hashem Ismail; Egypt	4716	Marie-Lourdes Ally Samba; Mauritius	4501

== Medal table ==
Rank	Nation	Gold	Silver	Bronze	Total
1	Nigeria (NGR)	10	10	9	29
2	Kenya (KEN)	9	9	7	25
3	Morocco (MAR)	6	5	2	13
4	Ethiopia (ETH)	4	2	6	12
5	Egypt (EGY)	3	5	4	12
6	Ivory Coast (CIV)	2	0	1	3
7	Madagascar (MAD)	2	0	0	2
7	Mozambique (MOZ)	2	0	0	2
9	Senegal (SEN)	1	2	2	5
10	Algeria (ALG)	1	1	3	5
11	Ghana (GHA)	1	1	1	3
12	Tanzania (TAN)	0	3	0	3
13	Uganda (UGA)	0	2	1	3
14	Mauritius (MRI)	0	1	5	6
Totals (14 entries)		41	41	41	123

== See also ==
- 1990 in athletics (track and field)
