= Constance Senghor =

Senegalese high jumper

Medal record

Women's athletics

Representing Senegal

African Championships
Silver medal – second place	1988 Annaba	High jump

Constance Senghor (born May 23, 1963) is a retired female high jumper from Senegal. She competed for her native country at the 1984 Summer Olympics in Los Angeles, California, finishing in 27th place in the final rankings with a jump of 1.70 m.

== Achievements ==
Year	Competition	Venue	Position	Event	Notes
Representing Senegal
1987	All-Africa Games	Nairobi, Kenya	3rd	High jump	1.73 m
