= Pius Bazighe =

Nigerian javelin thrower

Medal record

Men's Sport of athletics

Representing Nigeria

African Championships
Gold medal – first place	1989 Lagos	Javelin throw
Gold medal – first place	1996 Yaoundé	Javelin throw
Silver medal – second place	1990 Cairo	Javelin throw

Pius Bazighe (born 15 March 1972) is a retired male javelin thrower from Nigeria, who represented his native country at the 1996 Summer Olympics in Atlanta, Georgia. He set his personal best (81.08 metres) on 16 June 1999 at a meet in Athens, Greece, breaking the Nigerian national record.

== International competitions ==
Year	Competition	Venue	Position	Notes
Representing Nigeria
1989	African Championships	Lagos, Nigeria	1st	68.96 m
1990	African Championships	Cairo, Egypt	2nd	68.80 m
1991	All-Africa Games	Cairo, Egypt	2nd	71.78 m
1995	All-Africa Games	Harare, Zimbabwe	1st	77.56 m
1996	Olympic Games	Atlanta, United States	32nd	70.78 m
1997	World Championships	Athens, Greece	34th	69.64 m
