= 1992 African Championships in Athletics =

- Dates: 25–28 June
- Host city: Belle Vue Harel, Pamplemousses District, Mauritius
- Venue: Stade Anjalay

The 1992 African Championships in Athletics were held between 25 and 28 June 1992 in Belle Vue Harel, Pamplemousses District, Mauritius at the Stade Anjalay.

== Medal summary ==
=== Men's events ===
Event	Gold		Silver		Bronze	
100 metres (wind: +1.5 m/s)	Victor Omagbemi; Nigeria	10.34	Charles-Louis Seck; Senegal	10.40	Johan Rossouw; South Africa	10.43
200 metres (wind: -2.0 m/s)	Victor Omagbemi; Nigeria	21.20	Emmanuel Tuffour; Ghana	21.28	John Myles-Mills; Ghana	21.31
400 metres	Bobang Phiri; South Africa	45.42	Kennedy Ochieng; Kenya	46.23	Abedinego Matilu; Kenya	46.62
800 metres	Charles Nkazamyampi; Burundi	1:46.95	Cliffie Miller; South Africa	1:47.19	Mahjoub Haïda; Morocco	1:47.71
1500 metres	Nelson Chirchir; Kenya	3:38.52	Johan Landsman; South Africa	3:38.60	Robert Mdogo; Kenya	3:39.18
5000 metres	James Songok; Kenya	13:24.63	Worku Bikila; Ethiopia	13:25.98	Josphat Machuka; Kenya	13:28.85
10,000 metres	Josphat Machuka; Kenya	27:59.70	Matthews Motshwarateu; South Africa	28:22.57	Xolile Yawa; South Africa	28:27.82
3000 metre steeplechase	Whaddon Niewoudt; South Africa	8:26.44	Gladstone Kabiga; Kenya	8:26.68	Eliud Barngetuny; Kenya	8:38.02
110 metres hurdles (wind: +1.4 m/s)	Judex Lefou; Mauritius	13.91 CR	Kobus Schoeman; South Africa	13.92	Wimpie Nel; South Africa	13.98
400 metres hurdles	Dries Vorster; South Africa	49.66	Amadou Dia Bâ; Senegal	49.71	Hubert Rakotombélontsoa; Madagascar	50.56
4 × 100 metres relay	South Africa; Johan Rossouw; Gerhard Barnard; Glen Elferink; Tsakile Nzimande	39.57	Senegal; Seydou Loum; Amadou Mbaye; Charles-Louis Seck; Edouard Samatey	39.60	Nigeria; Victor Omagbemi; Michael Monye; Hyacinth Anejo; Hashim Osman	39.73
4 × 400 metres relay	South Africa; Ferrins Pieterse; Cliffie Miller; Dries Vorster; Bobang Phiri	3:06.95	Senegal; Ibou Faye; Hachim Ndiaye; Ibrahima Tamba; Abubakry Dia	3:07.77	Kenya; Abedinego Matilu; Kennedy Ochieng; Christopher Oloo; David Kimeli	3:08.37
20 kilometre road walk	Chris Britz; South Africa	1:29:56	Johan Moerdyk; South Africa	1:30:54	Riecus Blignouat; South Africa	1:31:59
High jump	Yacine Mousli; Algeria	2.21 CR	Othmane Belfaa; Algeria	2.16	Khemraj Naiko; Mauritius	2.16
Pole vault	Okkert Brits; South Africa	5.35 CR	Kersley Gardenne; Mauritius	5.30	Riaan Botha; South Africa	5.20
Long jump	Ayodele Aladefa; Nigeria	7.95	François Fouché; South Africa	7.91	Danny Beauchamp; Seychelles	7.86
Triple jump	Toussaint Rabenala; Madagascar	17.04	Francis Dodoo; Ghana	16.43	Papa Ladji Konaté; Senegal	16.23
Shot put	Chima Ugwu; Nigeria	18.50	Khalid Fatihi; Morocco	17.49	Adewale Olukoju; Nigeria	17.06
Discus throw	Adewale Olukoju; Nigeria	60.66	Mohamed Naguib Hamed; Egypt	57.12	Dawie Kok; South Africa	55.72
Hammer throw	Hakim Toumi; Algeria	69.80	Sherif Farouk El Hennawi; Egypt	68.08	Charlie Koen; South Africa	63.14
Javelin throw	Tom Petranoff; South Africa	87.26 CR	Wilhelm Pauer; South Africa	81.60	Phillip Spies; South Africa	73.80
Decathlon	Mourad Mahour Bacha; Algeria	7467 CR	Gino Antoine; Mauritius	6803	Patrick Legrand; Mauritius	6798

=== Women's events ===
Event	Gold		Silver		Bronze	
100 metres (wind: +1.7 m/s)	Elinda Vorster; South Africa	11.26	Marcel Winkler; South Africa	11.31	Rufina Uba; Nigeria	11.42
200 metres (wind: -1.8 m/s)	Elinda Vorster; South Africa	23.60	Marcel Winkler; South Africa	23.60	Yolanda Steyn; South Africa	24.11
400 metres	Omotayo Akinremi; Nigeria	52.53	Aïssatou Tandian; Senegal	52.64	Omolade Akinremi; Nigeria	53.14
800 metres	Zewde Haile Mariam; Ethiopia	2:06.20	Najat Ouali; Morocco	2:07.40	Ilse Wicksell; South Africa	2:07.48
1500 metres	Elana Meyer; South Africa	4:18.44	Gwen Griffiths; South Africa	4:20.79	Najat Ouali; Morocco	4:23.22
3000 metres	Derartu Tulu; Ethiopia	9:01.12	Gwen Griffiths; South Africa	9:03.10	Getenesh Urge; Ethiopia	9:03.32
10,000 metres	Derartu Tulu; Ethiopia	31:32.25	Lydia Cheromei; Kenya	31:41.09	Luchia Yishak; Ethiopia	32:28.86
100 metres hurdles (wind: +0.3 m/s)	Ime Akpan; Nigeria	13.14	Karen van der Veen; South Africa	13.29	Annemarie le Roux; South Africa	13.70
400 metres hurdles	Myrtle Bothma; South Africa	56.02	Nadia Zétouani; Morocco	57.31	Omolade Akinremi; Nigeria	57.43
4 × 100 metres relay	South Africa; Yolanda Steyn; Karen Botha; Marcel Winkler; Elinda Vorster	44.53	Nigeria; Onyinye Chikezie; Mary Tombiri; Rufina Ubah; Ime Akpan	45.19	Madagascar; Monica Rahanitraniriana; Hanitriniaina Rakotrondrabe; Nicole Ramalalanirina; Lalao Ravaonirina	45.38
4 × 400 metres relay	Nigeria; Omolade Akinremi; Omotayo Akinremi; Taiye Akinremi; Airat Bakare	3:33.13	South Africa; Marcel Winkler; Madele Naude; Lana Uys; Myrtle Bothma	3:36.19	Mauritius christine duverge Sandra Govinden; Sheila Seebaluck; Gilliane Quirin	3:42.68
5000 metre track walk	Dounia Kara; Algeria	24:57.02	Maryse Pyndiah; Mauritius	25:11.95	Susan Bingham; South Africa	25:45.64
High jump	Lucienne N'Da; Ivory Coast	1.95	Charmaine Weavers; South Africa	1.92	Desiré du Plessis; South Africa	1.86
Long jump	Karen Botha; South Africa	6.78	Stella Emefesi; Nigeria	5.98	Maryna van Niekerk; South Africa	5.98
Triple jump	Awa Dioum-Ndiaye; Senegal	12.47	Ndounga Kolossi; Kenya	12.41	Sonya Agbéssi; Benin	12.17
Shot put	Fouzia Fatihi; Morocco	15.82	Hanan Ahmed Khaled; Egypt	15.49	Elizabeth Olaba; Kenya	14.77
Discus throw	Lizette Etsebeth; South Africa	54.84	Nanette van der Walt; South Africa	53.40	Zoubida Laayouni; Morocco	52.74
Javelin throw	Seraphina Nyauma; Kenya	53.02	Liezl Roux; South Africa	52.42	Rhona Dwinger; South Africa	51.28
Heptathlon	Chrisna Oosthuizen; South Africa	5056	Caroline Kola; Kenya	4994	Albertine Koutouan; Ivory Coast	4977

== Medal table ==
Rank	Nation	Gold	Silver	Bronze	Total
1	South Africa (SAF)	16	16	15	47
2	Nigeria (NGR)	8	2	5	15
3	Kenya (KEN)	4	5	6	15
4	Algeria (ALG)	4	1	0	5
5	Ethiopia (ETH)	3	1	2	6
6	Senegal (SEN)	1	5	1	7
7	Mauritius (MRI)	1	3	3	7
7	Morocco (MAR)	1	3	3	7
9	Madagascar (MAD)	1	0	2	3
10	Ivory Coast (CIV)	1	0	1	2
11	Burundi (BDI)	1	0	0	1
12	Egypt (EGY)	0	3	0	3
13	Ghana (GHA)	0	2	1	3
14	Benin (BEN)	0	0	1	1
14	Seychelles (SEY)	0	0	1	1
Totals (15 entries)		41	41	41	123

== See also ==
- 1992 in athletics (track and field)
