= Rhona Dwinger =

South African javelin thrower

Medal record

Women's athletics

Representing South Africa

African Championships
Silver medal – second place	1993 Durban	Javelin throw
Bronze medal – third place	1992 Belle Vue Harel	Javelin throw

Rhona Dwinger (born 28 June 1971) is a retired South African javelin thrower.

She won the bronze medal at the 1992 African Championships, the silver medal at the 1993 African Championships, finished eighth at the 1994 World Cup and won the gold medal at the 1995 All-Africa Games.

Her personal best throw is 58,32 metres, achieved in February 2000 at ABSA Meeting in Greenpoint stadium Cape Town.
