= Evette de Klerk =

South African sprinter (born 1965)

Medal record

Women's athletics

Representing South Africa

African Championships
Silver medal – second place	1993 Durban	4×400 m
Bronze medal – third place	1993 Durban	200 m
Bronze medal – third place	1993 Durban	4×100 m

Evette de Klerk (born 21 August 1965) is a South African former track and field sprinter. She was the dominant female sprint athlete in South Africa in the 1980s, winning 100 metres/200 metres doubles at the national championships ten years running from 1982 to 1991. She also took three South African titles in the 400 metres. These included championships records of 11.06 seconds (her lifetime best) for the 100 m and 22.36 seconds for the 200 m.

Her personal bests in the short sprints both remain South African records for the distances. Her 200 m time of 22.06 seconds is the fastest recorded by an African athlete, but it is not the African record as it was not ratified by the continental governing body. That time ranked her second in the world over 200 m in 1989, behind Dawn Sowell. In addition to these marks, she set a best of 50.57 seconds for the 400 m.

De Klerk did not compete internationally while at the peak of her career as a result of the sporting boycott of South Africa during the apartheid era. Her sole major international appearances for South Africa came in her last season at the top level (1993). She was a double bronze medallist at the 1993 African Championships in Athletics, reaching the podium in both the 200 m and 4 × 100 metres relay. She went on to represent South Africa at the 1993 World Championships in Athletics and was a semi-finalist in the 200 m. She had rejected offers to compete for Britain while the boycott was in place, as her fellow South African Zola Budd did.

She briefly competed under a married name as Evette Armstrong in 1986 and 1987.

Carina Horn equalled de Klerk's 100 m national record in 2015, some 25 years after it had been set. De Klerk remains the outright holder of the fastest in all conditions, via her wind-assisted run of 10.94 seconds in 1990.

== International competitions ==
Year	Competition	Venue	Position	Event	Notes
1993	African Championships	Durban, South Africa	3rd	200 m	23.29
1993	African Championships	Durban, South Africa	3rd	4 × 100 m relay	45.15
1993	World Championships	Stuttgart, Germany	5th (semis)	200 m	22.76

== National titles ==
- South African Athletics Championships
  - 100 m: 1982, 1983, 1984, 1985, 1986, 1987, 1988, 1989, 1990, 1991
  - 200 m: 1982, 1983, 1984, 1985, 1986, 1987, 1988, 1989, 1990, 1991
  - 400 m: 1987, 1992, 1993
