= Lency Montelier =

Cuban hurdler

Personal information
- Born: 13 February 1971 (age 55)
Medal record
Women's Athletics
Representing Cuba
Pan American Games
Gold medal – first place	1991 Havana	400m Hurdles
Bronze medal – third place	1995 Mar del Plata	400m Hurdles
CAC Junior Championships (U20)
Silver medal – second place	1988 Nassau	400 m hurdles

Lency Montelier Ellacia (born 13 February 1971) is a retired female track and field athlete from Cuba, best known for winning the gold medal in the women's 400m hurdles at the 1991 Pan American Games in Havana, Cuba.

== International competitions ==
Year	Competition	Venue	Position	Event	Notes
Representing Cuba
1988	Central American and Caribbean Junior Championships (U-20)	Nassau, Bahamas	2nd	400 m	63.58
1988	World Junior Championships	Sudbury, Canada	19th (h)	400m hurdles	61.05
1988	World Junior Championships	Sudbury, Canada	10th (h)	4 × 400 m relay	3:43.18
1990	World Junior Championships	Plovdiv, Bulgaria	24th (h)	400m hurdles	61.17
1991	Pan American Games	Havana, Cuba	1st	400 m hurdles	57.34
1991	World Championships	Tokyo, Japan	5th (sf)	4 × 400 m relay	2:31.43
1992	Ibero-American Championships	Seville, Spain	1st	400m hurdles	56.79
1992	Ibero-American Championships	Seville, Spain	1st	4 × 400 m relay	3:33.43
1993	Central American and Caribbean Championships	Cali, Colombia	2nd	4 × 400 m relay	3:28.95
1993	World Championships	Stuttgart, Germany	—	4 × 400 m relay	DNF
1993	Central American and Caribbean Games	Ponce, Puerto Rico	1st	400 m hurdles	57.61
1993	Central American and Caribbean Games	Ponce, Puerto Rico	1st	4 × 400 m relay	3:31.27
1995	Pan American Games	Mar del Plata, Argentina	3rd	400 m hurdles	55.74
1998	Central American and Caribbean Games	Maracaibo, Venezuela	4th	400 m hurdles	57.16
1998	Central American and Caribbean Games	Maracaibo, Venezuela	1st	4 × 400 m relay	3:29.65
