= Zewde Hailemariam =

Ethiopian middle-distance runner

Personal information
- Born: 22 September 1962 (age 63)
- Height: 1.70 m (5 ft 7 in)
- Weight: 51 kg (112 lb)

Sport
- Country: Ethiopia
- Sport: Athletics
- Event(s): 800 m, 400 m hurdles

Achievements and titles
- Personal bests: 800 m: 2:03.55; 400 m hurdles: 57.60 (NR)
Medal record
Women's athletics
Representing Ethiopia
African Championships
Gold medal – first place	1992 Belle-Vue	800 m
Silver medal – second place	1989 Lagos	800 m
Bronze medal – third place	1990 Cairo	800 m
Bronze medal – third place	1989 Lagos	400 m hurdles

Zewde Hailemariam (in some sources Zewdie, Haile Mariam; born 22 September 1962) is a former Ethiopian middle-distance runner who specialised in 800 meters, and 400 meters hurdles events. She won four medals in three different African Championships in Athletics from 1989 and 1992, including one gold in 800 metres at the 1992 edition in June of that year. Only a month later she competed for Ethiopia at the 1992 Summer Olympics in the same event, but ran 2:11.60, more than five seconds slower than at the continental championships, and finished sixth in her qualifying heat, failing to progress to the semi-finals. As of 2016, Hailemariam still holds the Ethiopian national 400 m hurdles record (57.60) she ran at the 1987 All-Africa Games in Nairobi.

== Achievements ==
Year	Competition	Venue	Position	Event	Notes
1987	All-Africa Games	Nairobi, Kenya	3rd	400 m hurdles	57.60 (NR)
1989	African Championships	Lagos, Nigeria	2nd	800 m	2:08.20
1989	African Championships	Lagos, Nigeria	3rd	400 m hurdles	59.51
1990	African Championships	Cairo, Egypt	3rd	800 m	2:15.14
1991	All-Africa Games	Cairo, Egypt	2nd	800 m	2:04.99
1992	African Championships	Belle-Vue, Mauritius	1st	800 m	2:06.20
1992	Summer Olympics	Barcelona, Spain	29th	800 m	2:11.60
