= David Kibet =

Kenyan middle-distance runner

Medal record

Men's athletics

Representing Kenya

African Championships
Gold medal – first place	1993 Durban	1500 m
Bronze medal – third place	1990 Cairo	1500 m

David Kibet (born November 24, 1963, in Burnt Forest) is a former Kenyan middle-distance runner who won a bronze medal at the African Championships 1990 over 1500 m. Kibet finished tenth in the 1992 Summer Olympics final and seventh in the 1991 World Championships. His greatest achievement was the victory in the Oslo Dream Mile 1992 where he defeated the world champion Noureddine Morceli. In 1992 he also set a temporary Kenyan record in 1500 m at 3:32.13 minutes.
