= Athletics at the 1991 Pan American Games – Men's long jump =

Men's long jump at the Pan American Games

The men's long jump event at the 1991 Pan American Games was held in Havana, Cuba on 5 August.

== Results ==
Rank	Name	Nationality	#1	#2	#3	#4	#5	#6	Result	Notes
1st place, gold medalist(s)	Jaime Jefferson	Cuba	8.26	x	x	x	–	7.74	8.26	
2nd place, silver medalist(s)	Llewellyn Starks	United States	7.81	x	7.52	7.62	x	8.01	8.01	
3rd place, bronze medalist(s)	Iván Pedroso	Cuba	x	7.48	7.86	7.96	7.74	7.88	7.96	
4	Elmer Williams	Puerto Rico	7.59	x	7.78	7.47	7.68	x	7.78	
5	Ron Chambers	Jamaica	x	x	7.60	7.53	7.13	7.26	7.60	
6	Wendell Williams	Trinidad and Tobago	7.52w	x	x	7.36	7.31	7.42	7.52w	
7	Paulo de Oliveira	Brazil	7.44	7.47	x	7.29	7.19	–	7.47	
8	Craig Hepburn	Bahamas	7.37	7.46	7.22	7.03	–	–	7.46	
9	Alan Turner	United States	7.03	7.27	7.29				7.29	
10	Fred Lottimore	Bermuda	5.93	7.23	x				7.23	
11	Aston Morgan	Jamaica	6.95	6.93	7.10				7.10	
12	Eugene Licorish	Grenada	6.54	x	x				6.54	
	Ian Hilton	Canada	x	x	x				NM	
