= 1988 World Junior Championships in Athletics – Women's 400 metres hurdles =

The women's 400 metres hurdles event at the 1988 World Junior Championships in Athletics was held in Sudbury, Ontario, Canada, at Laurentian University Stadium on 27, 28 and 29 July.

== Medalists ==
Gold	Antje Axmann; East Germany
Silver	Ann Maenhout; Belgium
Bronze	Silvia Rieger; West Germany

== Results ==
=== Final ===
29 July

Rank	Name	Nationality	Time	Notes
1st place, gold medalist(s)	Antje Axmann	East Germany	57.47	
2nd place, silver medalist(s)	Ann Maenhout	Belgium	57.58	
3rd place, bronze medalist(s)	Silvia Rieger	West Germany	57.88	
4	Frida Johansson	Sweden	58.71	
5	Aura Cracea	Romania	58.79	
6	Petra Schellenbeck	West Germany	58.99	
7	Sofia Sabeva	Bulgaria	59.07	
8	Yelena Pavlova	Soviet Union	59.25	

=== Semifinals ===
28 July

==== Semifinal 1 ====
Rank	Name	Nationality	Time	Notes
1	Antje Axmann	East Germany	57.69	Q
2	Sofia Sabeva	Bulgaria	57.84	Q
3	Ann Maenhout	Belgium	58.41	Q
4	Aura Cracea	Romania	59.96	q
5	Anna Chuprina	Soviet Union	60.06	
6	Li Liang	China	60.17	
7	Zsofia Antok	Hungary	60.18	
	Senzeni Steingruber	Canada	DQ	

==== Semifinal 2 ====
Rank	Name	Nationality	Time	Notes
1	Frida Johansson	Sweden	58.71	Q
2	Silvia Rieger	West Germany	59.07	Q
3	Yelena Pavlova	Soviet Union	59.52	Q
4	Petra Schellenbeck	West Germany	60.01	q
5	Caroline Fortin	Canada	60.39	
6	Stella Theocharous	Cyprus	62.87	
	María Díez	Spain	DNF	
	Tracy Allen	United Kingdom	DNF	

=== Heats ===
27 July

==== Heat 1 ====
Rank	Name	Nationality	Time	Notes
1	Ann Maenhout	Belgium	59.51	Q
2	Aura Cracea	Romania	59.54	Q
3	Annette Cavanagh	Australia	61.10	
4	Joanne Fitzgerald	Ireland	61.85	
5	Margaret Persée	France	61.98	
6	Vanessa Jack	New Zealand	63.21	
7	Su Huei-Chun	Chinese Taipei	63.61	

==== Heat 2 ====
Rank	Name	Nationality	Time	Notes
1	Tracy Allen	United Kingdom	59.36	Q
2	Silvia Rieger	West Germany	59.59	Q
3	Anna Chuprina	Soviet Union	60.37	q
4	Stella Theocharous	Cyprus	60.55	q
5	Monica De Col	Italy	60.69	
6	Telisa Young	United States	62.07	
7	Alma Leticia Jiménez	Guatemala	63.65	

==== Heat 3 ====
Rank	Name	Nationality	Time	Notes
1	Antje Axmann	East Germany	59.28	Q
2	Zsofia Antok	Hungary	59.90	Q
3	Caroline Fortin	Canada	60.05	q
4	Marie Womplou	Côte d'Ivoire	60.78	
5	Sara Elson	United Kingdom	61.89	
6	Anna Shattky	New Zealand	62.00	
	Claudia Riquelme	Chile	DNF	

==== Heat 4 ====
Rank	Name	Nationality	Time	Notes
1	Petra Schellenbeck	West Germany	59.59	Q
2	Senzeni Steingruber	Canada	59.71	Q
3	María Díez	Spain	59.73	q
4	Lency Montelier	Cuba	61.05	
5	Kristien Pellaerts	Belgium	61.36	
6	Yuan Haiying	China	62.05	
7	Shelly Mitchell	United States	62.82	

==== Heat 5 ====
Rank	Name	Nationality	Time	Notes
1	Yelena Pavlova	Soviet Union	59.23	Q
2	Sofia Sabeva	Bulgaria	59.28	Q
3	Frida Johansson	Sweden	59.30	q
4	Li Liang	China	59.65	q
5	Adrienne Rainbird	Australia	61.99	
6	Ulla Tapio	Finland	62.00	
7	Paula Carty	Ireland	63.54	

== Participation ==
According to an unofficial count, 35 athletes from 25 countries participated in the event.

- Australia (2)
- Belgium (2)
- Bulgaria (1)
- Canada (2)
- Chile (1)
- China (2)
- Chinese Taipei (1)
- Côte d'Ivoire (1)
- Cuba (1)
- Cyprus (1)
- East Germany (1)
- Finland (1)
- France (1)
- Guatemala (1)
- Hungary (1)
- Ireland (2)
- Italy (1)
- New Zealand (2)
- Romania (1)
- Soviet Union (2)
- Spain (1)
- Sweden (1)
- United Kingdom (2)
- United States (2)
- West Germany (2)
