= 1989 African Championships in Athletics =

- Dates: 4–8 August
- Host city: Lagos, Nigeria

The 1989 African Championships in Athletics were held in Lagos, Nigeria between 4 and 8 August.

== Medal summary ==
=== Men's events ===
Event	Gold		Silver		Bronze	
100 metres (wind: -0.4 m/s)	Amadou Mbagnick Mbaye; Senegal	10.60	Salaam Gariba; Ghana	10.64	Patrick Nwankwo; Nigeria	10.66
200 metres (wind: -1.2 m/s)	Olapade Adeniken; Nigeria	20.74	Davidson Ezinwa; Nigeria	20.82	Nelson Boateng; Ghana	20.84
400 metres	Gabriel Tiacoh; Ivory Coast	45.25	Simeon Kipkemboi; Kenya	46.29	Hachim Ndiaye; Senegal	46.69
800 metres	Nixon Kiprotich; Kenya	1:45.71	Joseph Chesire; Kenya	1:45.96	Babacar Niang; Senegal	1:46.09
1500 metres	Joseph Chesire; Kenya	3:39.43	Robert Kibet; Kenya	3:40.05	Nixon Kiprotich; Kenya	3:41.51
5000 metres	John Ngugi; Kenya	13:22.07	Addis Abebe; Ethiopia	13:35.09	Moses Tanui; Kenya	13:36.79
10,000 metres	Addis Abebe; Ethiopia	27:51.07	Moses Tanui; Kenya	28:22.90	Bedilu Kibret; Ethiopia	28:29.14
Marathon	Tsegaye Sengni; Ethiopia	2:26:26	Kebede Balcha; Ethiopia	2:26:35	Tekla Gebrselassie; Ethiopia	2:26:55
3000 metre steeplechase	Azzedine Brahmi; Algeria	8:31.29	Micah Boinett; Kenya	8:31.79	Boniface Merande; Kenya	8:35.35
110 metres hurdles (wind: 0.0 m/s)	Ikechukwu Mbadugha; Nigeria	14.16	Noureddine Tadjine; Algeria	14.18	Akwasi Abrefa; Ghana	14.56
400 metres hurdles	Henry Amike; Nigeria	49.58	Hamidou Mbaye; Senegal	50.76	Saïd Aberkan; Morocco	50.84
4 × 100 metres relay	Nigeria	39.94	Kenya	40.78	Ivory Coast	40.91
4 × 400 metres relay	Kenya	3:04.44	Nigeria	3:05.54	Senegal	3:08.18
20 kilometre road walk	Mohamed Bouhalla; Algeria	1:30:43	Abdelwahab Ferguène; Algeria	1:36:49	Bekele Lema; Ethiopia	1:45:25
High jump	Othmane Belfaa; Algeria	2.20	Abdenour Krim; Algeria	2.15	Boubacar Guèye; Senegal	2.10
Pole vault	Sami Si Mohamed; Algeria	4.90	Issam Ben Mohamed; Tunisia	4.80	Samir Agsous; Algeria	4.60
Long jump	Yusuf Alli; Nigeria	8.27	Ayodele Aladefa; Nigeria	7.89	Badara Mbengue; Senegal	7.88
Triple jump	Eugene Koranteng; Ghana	16.83	Toussaint Rabenala; Madagascar	16.80	Paul Nioze; Seychelles	16.74
Shot put	Robert Welikhe; Kenya	17.28	Chima Ugwu; Nigeria	16.76	Vincent Oghene; Nigeria	16.62
Discus throw	Hassan Ahmed Hamad; Egypt	53.44	Vincent Oghene; Nigeria	52.98	Ikechukwu Chika; Nigeria	50.70
Hammer throw	Hakim Toumi; Algeria	69.98	Hassan Chahine; Morocco	66.86	Djamel Zouiche; Algeria	63.52
Javelin throw	Pius Bazighe; Nigeria	68.96	Mongi Alimi; Tunisia	68.42	William Sang; Kenya	68.06
Decathlon	Mourad Mahour Bacha; Algeria	7080	Hatem Bachar; Tunisia	6757	Stanley Flowers; Zimbabwe	6519 (NR)

=== Women's events ===
Event	Gold		Silver		Bronze	
100 metres (wind: -0.9 m/s)	Mary Onyali; Nigeria	11.22	Tina Iheagwam; Nigeria	11.28	Rufina Uba; Nigeria	11.47
200 metres (wind: -1.6 m/s)	Mary Onyali; Nigeria	23.00	Falilat Ogunkoya; Nigeria	23.74	Lalao Ravaonirina; Madagascar	23.94
400 metres	Falilat Ogunkoya; Nigeria	51.22	Fatima Yusuf; Nigeria	52.30	Airat Bakare; Nigeria	52.38
800 metres	Hassiba Boulmerka; Algeria	2:06.80	Zewde Haile Mariam; Ethiopia	2:08.20	Emebet Shiferaw; Ethiopia	2:09.30
1500 metres	Hassiba Boulmerka; Algeria	4:13.85	Hellen Kimaiyo; Kenya	4:16.42	Emebet Shiferaw; Ethiopia	4:20.81
3000 metres	Hellen Kimaiyo; Kenya	9:14.97	Jane Ngotho; Kenya	9:15.43	Luchia Yishak; Ethiopia	9:24.31
10,000 metres	Jane Ngotho; Kenya	33:05.60	Tigist Moreda; Ethiopia	34:05.58	Marcianne Mukamurenzi; Rwanda	34:09.48
100 metres hurdles	Dinah Yankey; Ghana	13.68	Hope Obika; Nigeria	13.80	Mosun Adesina; Nigeria	13.86
400 metres hurdles	Maria Usifo; Nigeria	55.45	Marie Womplou; Ivory Coast	57.57	Zewde Haile Mariam; Ethiopia	59.51
4 × 100 metres relay	Nigeria ? ? Beatrice Utondu ?	44.6	Ghana	45.4	Ivory Coast	46
4 × 400 metres relay	Nigeria; Airat Bakare; Falilat Ogunkoya; Charity Opara; Fatima Yusuf	3:33.12	Kenya	3:39.60	Ivory Coast	3:41.87
5000 metre track walk	Agnetha Chelimo; Kenya	26:36.18	Mercy Nyambura; Kenya	27:08.58		
High jump	Lucienne N'Da; Ivory Coast	1.81	Nkechi Madubuko; Nigeria	1.78	Yasmina Azzizi; Algeria	1.78
Long jump	Chioma Ajunwa; Nigeria	6.53	Beatrice Utondu; Nigeria	6.20	Christy Opara; Nigeria	6.18
Shot put	Hanan Ahmed Khaled; Egypt	14.28	Mariam Nnodu; Nigeria	14.02	Ann Otutu; Nigeria	13.88
Discus throw	Zoubida Laayouni; Morocco	51.14	Hanan Ahmed Khaled; Egypt	50.32	Nabila Mouelhi; Tunisia	46.80
Javelin throw	Chinweoke Chikwelu; Nigeria	52.18	Milka Johnson; Kenya	50.32	Yasmina Azzizi; Algeria	48.16
Heptathlon	Yasmina Azzizi; Algeria	5957	Nacèra Zaaboub (Achir); Algeria	5573	Chinweoke Chikwelu; Nigeria	5503

== Medal table ==
Rank	Nation	Gold	Silver	Bronze	Total
1	Nigeria	14	12	9	35
2	Algeria	9	4	4	17
3	Kenya	8	11	4	23
4	Ethiopia	2	4	7	13
5	Ghana	2	2	2	6
6	Ivory Coast	2	1	3	6
7	Egypt	2	1	0	3
8	Senegal	1	1	5	7
9	Morocco	1	1	1	3
10	Tunisia	0	3	1	4
11	Madagascar	0	1	1	2
12	Rwanda	0	0	1	1
12	Seychelles	0	0	1	1
12	Zimbabwe	0	0	1	1
Totals (14 entries)		41	41	40	122

== See also ==
- 1989 in athletics (track and field)
