= Shemsu Hassan =

Ethiopian racewalker

Medal record

Men's athletics

Representing Ethiopia

African Championships
Gold medal – first place	1982 Cairo	20 km walk
Gold medal – first place	1990 Cairo	20 km walk
Silver medal – second place	1985 Cairo	20 km walk

Shemsu Hassan (born 1968) is an Ethiopian former racewalker who represented his country in international events. He competed in the 1992 Summer Olympics.

== Competition record ==
Year	Competition	Venue	Position	Event	Notes
Representing Ethiopia
1982	African Championships	Cairo, Egypt	1st	20 km walk	1:41:39
1983	World Championships	Helsinki, Finland	38th	20 km walk	1:30:36
1984	Friendship Games	Moscow, Soviet Union	8th	20 km walk	1:27:08
1985	African Championships	Cairo, Egypt	2nd	20 km walk	1:42:26
1987	All-Africa Games	Nairobi, Kenya	1st	20 km walk	1:35:57
1990	African Championships	Cairo, Egypt	1st	20 km walk	1:29:31
1991	All-Africa Games	Cairo, Egypt	1st	20 km walk	1:29:04
1992	Olympic Games	Barcelona, Spain	25th	20 km walk	1:32:39
1995	All-Africa Games	Harare, Zimbabwe	3rd	20 km walk	1:32:03
1999	All-Africa Games	Johannesburg, South Africa	–	20 km walk	DQ
