= Hamidou M'Baye =

Senegalese Olympian hurdler

Personal information
- Nationality: Senegalese
- Born: 21 April 1964 (age 62)

Sport
- Sport: Track and field
- Event: 400 metres hurdles
Medal record
Men's athletics
Representing Senegal
African Championships
Gold medal – first place	1990 Cairo	400 m hurdles
Silver medal – second place	1989 Lagos	400 m hurdles
Bronze medal – third place	1988 Annaba	400 m hurdles
Bronze medal – third place	1988 Annaba	4×100 m
Bronze medal – third place	1993 Durban	400 m hurdles
Bronze medal – third place	1993 Durban	4×400 m

Hamidou M'Baye (born 21 April 1964) is a Senegalese hurdler. He competed in the 400 metres hurdles at the 1988 Summer Olympics and the 1996 Summer Olympics.
