= Athletics at the 1991 Pan American Games – Women's 400 metres hurdles =

Women's 400 metres hurdles at the Pan American Games

The women's 400 metres hurdles event at the 1991 Pan American Games was held in Havana, Cuba on 8 and 10 August.

== Medalists ==
Gold	Silver	Bronze
Lency Montelier; Cuba	Deon Hemmings; Jamaica	Tonja Buford; United States

== Results ==
=== Heats ===
Rank	Heat	Name	Nationality	Time	Notes
1	2	Schowanda Williams	United States	58.09	Q
2	2	Deon Hemmings	Jamaica	58.16	Q
3	1	Elsa Jiménez	Cuba	58.29	Q
4	1	Carolyn Fortin	Canada	58.86	Q
5	1	Tonja Buford	United States	58.98	Q
6	2	Maribelcy Peña	Colombia	59.52	Q
7	2	Lency Montelier	Cuba	59.81	q
8	1	Kareth Smith	Jamaica	1:00.79	q
9	2	Arlene Philips	Venezuela	1:02.09	
10	2	Inés Justet	Uruguay	1:02.28	
11	1	Yvette Haynes	Saint Vincent and the Grenadines	1:02.87	

=== Final ===
Rank	Name	Nationality	Time	Notes
1st place, gold medalist(s)	Lency Montelier	Cuba	57.34	
2nd place, silver medalist(s)	Deon Hemmings	Jamaica	57.54	
3rd place, bronze medalist(s)	Tonja Buford	United States	57.81	
4	Elsa Jiménez	Cuba	57.83	
5	Schowanda Williams	United States	57.95	
6	Carolyn Fortin	Canada	58.92	
7	Maribelcy Peña	Colombia	59.14	
8	Kareth Smith	Jamaica	1:00.16	
