= Athletics at the Friendship Games – Men's 20 kilometres walk =

The men's 20 kilometres walk event at the Friendship Games was held on 17 August 1984 in Moscow, Soviet Union.

== Results ==
Rank	Name	Nationality	Time	Notes
1st place, gold medalist(s)	Sergey Protsishin	Soviet Union	1:21:57	
2nd place, silver medalist(s)	Anatoliy Solomin	Soviet Union	1:22:21	
3rd place, bronze medalist(s)	Nikolay Polozov	Soviet Union	1:22:40	
4	Lyubomir Ivanov	Bulgaria	1:24:05	
5	Reima Salonen	Finland	1:24:40	
6	Roman Mrázek	Czechoslovakia	1:24:50	
7	Zdzisław Szlapkin	Poland	1:25:47	
8	Shemsu Hassan	Ethiopia	1:27:08	
9	Alik Basriev	Bulgaria	1:28:21	
10	Jorge Yannone	Argentina	1:39:51	
	Jozef Pribilinec	Czechoslovakia	DQ	
	Pavol Blažek	Czechoslovakia	DQ	

== See also ==
- Athletics at the 1984 Summer Olympics – Men's 20 kilometres walk
