= Athletics at the 1991 Summer Universiade – Men's long jump =

The men's long jump event at the 1991 Summer Universiade was held at the Don Valley Stadium in Sheffield on 23 and 24 July 1991.

== Medalists ==
| Gold | Silver | Bronze |
|---|---|---|
| Alan Turner; United States | George Ogbeide; Nigeria | Bogdan Tudor; Romania |

== Results ==
=== Qualification ===
| Rank | Group | Athlete | Nationality | #1 | #2 | #3 | Result | Notes |
|---|---|---|---|---|---|---|---|---|
| 1 | A | Zhou Ming | China | | | | 7.94 | q |
| 2 | B | Bogdan Tudor | Romania | | | | 7.85w | q |
| 3 | A | Alan Turner | United States | | | | 7.83 | q |
| 4 | B | Hans-Peter Lott | Germany | | | | 7.79 | q |
| 5 | A | Dave Culbert | Australia | | | | 7.77 | q |
| 5 | B | Germund Johansson | Sweden | | | | 7.77 | q |
| 7 | B | George Ogbeide | Nigeria | | | | 7.75 | q |
| 8 | B | Masaki Sumitami | Japan | | | | 7.66 | q |
| 9 | A | Zsolt Szabó | Hungary | | | | 7.65w | q |
| 10 | A | Volker Goedicke | Germany | | | | 7.62 | q |
| 10 | A | Jean-Charles Odon Achy | Ivory Coast | | | | 7.62w | q |
| 10 | B | Xu Bin | China | | | | 7.62 | q |
| 13 | ? | Rudi Vanlancker | Belgium | | | | 7.61 | |
| 14 | ? | Luis Alberto Bueno | Cuba | | | | 7.60 | |
| 15 | ? | Siniša Ergotić | Yugoslavia | | | | 7.58 | |
| 15 | ? | Charles Armstead | United States | | | | 7.58 | |
| 17 | ? | Lotfi Khaïda | Algeria | | | | 7.56 | |
| 18 | ? | Franck Lestage | France | | | | 7.54 | |
| 19 | ? | Krasimir Minchev | Bulgaria | | | | 7.53 | |
| 20 | ? | Kareem Streete-Thompson | Cayman Islands | | | | 7.50 | |
| 21 | ? | Eugene Koranteng | Ghana | | | | 7.49 | |
| 22 | ? | Gary Slade | Great Britain | x | 7.16 | 7.45 | 7.45 | |
| 23 | ? | Balász Marik | Hungary | | | | 7.37 | |
| 24 | ? | Akira Anzai | Japan | | | | 7.32 | |
| 25 | ? | Chao Chih-kuo | Chinese Taipei | | | | 7.29 | |
| 26 | ? | Yousan Lekahena | Indonesia | | | | 7.22 | |
| 27 | ? | Franck Zio | Burkina Faso | | | | 7.10 | |
| 28 | ? | António Veiga | Portugal | | | | 7.07 | |
| 29 | ? | Davies Acquah | Ghana | | | | 7.00 | |
| 30 | ? | Hakim Mazou | Republic of the Congo | | | | 6.97 | |
| 31 | ? | Eben Esterhuizen | Namibia | | | | 6.81 | |
| 32 | ? | Francis Keita | Sierra Leone | | | | 6.51 | |
| 33 | ? | Tom Ganda | Sierra Leone | | | | 6.44 | |
| 34 | ? | Mohammad Abedi | Iran | | | | 6.41 | |
| 35 | ? | Mansour Sultan Al-Touqi | Oman | | | | 6.22 | |
| 36 | ? | Mohammad Ali Karimi | Iran | | | | 6.16 | |
| 37 | ? | Yousuf Azeem | Maldives | | | | 5.84 | |

=== Final ===
| Rank | Athlete | Nationality | Result | Notes |
|---|---|---|---|---|
| 1st place, gold medalist(s) | Alan Turner | United States | 8.18w | |
| 2nd place, silver medalist(s) | George Ogbeide | Nigeria | 8.08 | |
| 3rd place, bronze medalist(s) | Bogdan Tudor | Romania | 8.01 | |
| 4 | Zhou Ming | China | 7.91 | |
| 5 | Masaki Sumitami | Japan | 7.84 | |
| 6 | Germund Johansson | Sweden | 7.84 | |
| 7 | Dave Culbert | Australia | 7.83 | |
| 8 | Zsolt Szabó | Hungary | 7.71 | |
| 9 | Hans-Peter Lott | Germany | 7.68 | |
| 10 | Volker Goedicke | Germany | 7.61 | |
| 11 | Xu Bin | China | 7.56w | |
| 12 | Jean-Charles Odon Achy | Ivory Coast | 7.40 | |
