= 1993 African Championships in Athletics =

- Dates: 23–27 June
- Host city: Durban, South Africa
- Venue: Kings Park Stadium

The 9th African Championships in Athletics were held between 23 and 27 June 1993 in Durban, South Africa at Kings Park Stadium.

== Medal summary ==
=== Men's events ===
Event	Gold		Silver		Bronze	
100 metres (wind: -0.3 m/s)	Daniel Effiong; Nigeria	10.39	Jean-Olivier Zirignon; Ivory Coast	10.53	Nelson Boateng; Ghana	10.55
200 metres (wind: +1.7 m/s)	Johan Rossouw; South Africa	20.65 CR	Oluyemi Kayode; Nigeria	20.79	Nelson Boateng; Ghana	21.01
400 metres	Kennedy Ochieng; Kenya	45.29	Ibrahim Hassan; Ghana	45.90	Simon Kemboi; Kenya	46.06
800 metres	Sammy Langat; Kenya	1:45.43	Paul Ruto; Kenya	1:45.99	Arthémon Hatungimana; Burundi	1:46.42
1500 metres	David Kibet; Kenya	3:45.67	Johan Landsman; South Africa	3:46.03	Johan Fourie; South Africa	3:46.22
5000 metres	Simon Chemoiywo; Kenya	13:09.68 CR	Haile Gebrselassie; Ethiopia	13:10.41	Worku Bikila; Ethiopia	13:12.53
10,000 metres	William Sigei; Kenya	27:25.23 CR	Fita Bayissa; Ethiopia	27:26.90	Haile Gebrselassie; Ethiopia	27:30.17
3000 metre steeplechase	Joseph Keter; Kenya	8:22.34	Christopher Kosgei; Kenya	8:24.58	Simretu Alemayehu; Ethiopia	8:31.51
110 metres hurdles (wind: +0.4 m/s)	Kobus Schoeman; South Africa	13.93	Moses Oyiki Orode; Nigeria	14.21	Winpie Nel; South Africa	14.22
400 metres hurdles	Erick Keter; Kenya	49.38	Dries Vorster; South Africa	49.59	Hamidou Mbaye; Senegal	50.22
4 × 100 metres relay	Ghana; Nelson Boateng; Felix Andam; Abbas Tanko; Kofi Yevakpor	39.53	Nigeria; Daniel Effiong; Paul Egonye; Oluyemi Kayode; Victor Omagbemi	39.97	South Africa; Tshakile Nzimande; Johan Rossouw; Johann Venter; Adrian Lambert	40.25
4 × 400 metres relay	Kenya; Charles Gitonga; Simon Kemboi; Simon Kipkemboi; Kennedy Ochieng	3:03.10	Nigeria; Alohan Omokaro; Hassan Bosso; Udeme Ekpeyong; John Okoye	3:06.03	Senegal; Soulemane Diumbia; Ibou Faye; Hamidou Mbaye; Hachim N'Diaye	3:06.38
20 kilometre road walk	Getachew Demisse; Ethiopia	1:28:56	Chris Britz; South Africa	1:29:28	Riecus Blignouat; South Africa	1:30:55
High jump	Flippie van Vuuren; South Africa	2.22 CR	Khemraj Naiko; Mauritius	2.19	Pierre Vorster; South Africa	2.13
Pole vault	Okkert Brits; South Africa	5.40 CR	Riaan Botha; South Africa	5.20	Brian Mardaymootoo; Mauritius	4.60
Long jump	Obinna Eregbu; Nigeria	8.32w	Ayodele Aladefa; Nigeria	8.05w	James Sabulei; Kenya	7.99
Triple jump	Toussaint Rabenala; Madagascar	16.72	Wikus Olivier; South Africa	16.35	Paul Nioze; Seychelles	16.11
Shot put	Carel le Roux; South Africa	18.29	Chima Ugwu; Nigeria	18.07	Jaco Snyman; South Africa	17.38
Discus throw	Mickael Conjungo; Central African Republic	59.92	Christo Kruger; South Africa	54.42	Dawie Kok; South Africa	54.08
Hammer throw	Hakim Toumi; Algeria	69.82	Samir Haouam; Algeria	63.76	Charlie Koen; South Africa	60.46
Javelin throw	Tom Petranoff; South Africa	82.40	Phillip Spies; South Africa	77.68	Louis Fouché; South Africa	77.10
Decathlon	Pierre Faber; South Africa	7164	Danie van Wyk; South Africa	7108	Hassan Farouk Sayed; Egypt	6770

=== Women's events ===
Event	Gold		Silver		Bronze	
100 metres (wind: -1.2 m/s)	Beatrice Utondu; Nigeria	11.39	Elinda Vorster; South Africa	11.45	Christy Opara-Thompson; Nigeria	11.60
200 metres (wind: +1.9 m/s)	Mary Onyali; Nigeria	22.71	Yolanda Steyn; South Africa	23.22	Evette de Klerk; South Africa	23.29
400 metres	Tina Paulino; Mozambique	51.82	Emily Odoemenam; Nigeria	52.26	Aïssatou Tandian; Senegal	53.00
800 metres	Maria de Lurdes Mutola; Mozambique	1:56.36	Gladys Wamuyu; Kenya	2:01.24	Ilse Wicksell; South Africa	2:03.75
1500 metres	Elana Meyer; South Africa	4:12.56	Gwen Griffiths; South Africa	4:13.17	Getenesh Urge; Ethiopia	4:13.68
3000 metres	Gwen Griffiths; South Africa	9:13.92	Merima Denboba; Ethiopia	9:14.48	Hellen Chepngeno; Kenya	9:14.49
10,000 metres	Berhane Adere; Ethiopia	32:48.52	Lydia Cheromei; Kenya	32:54.55	Fatuma Roba; Ethiopia	32:55.32
100 metres hurdles (wind: +0.3 m/s)	Nicole Ramalalanirina; Madagascar	13.32	Taiwo Aladefa; Nigeria	13.50	Annemarie le Roux; South Africa	13.74
400 metres hurdles	Omotayo Akinremi; Nigeria	57.59	Lana Uys; South Africa	57.60	Karen Swanepoel; South Africa	58.23
4 × 100 metres relay	Nigeria; Faith Idehen; Mary Onyali-Omagbemi; Christy Opara-Thompson; Beatrice Utondu	43.49	Madagascar; Hanitriniaina Rakotrondrabe; Nicole Ramalalanirina; Lalao Ravaonirina; Lantoniaina Ramalalanirina	44.93	South Africa; Evette de Klerk; Yolanda Steyn; Elinda Vorster; Susan Knox	45.15
4 × 400 metres relay	Nigeria; Omolade Akinremi; Omotayo Akinremi; Emily Odoemenam; Mary Onyali-Omagbemi	3:33.21	South Africa; Evette de Klerk; Lana Uys; Marinda Fourie; Adri Schoeman	3:37.24	Ghana; Helen Amoako; Helena Wrappah; Nabiama Salifu; Agnes Yaa Nuamah	3:39.66
5000 metre track walk	Dounia Kara; Algeria	24:33.56	Amsale Yakobe; Ethiopia	24:39.04	Felicita Falconer; South Africa	25:32.68
High jump	Charmaine Weavers; South Africa	1.90	Lucienne N'Da; Ivory Coast	1.86	Desiré du Plessis; South Africa	1.80
Long jump	Christy Opara-Thompson; Nigeria	6.57	Beatrice Utondu; Nigeria	6.44	Hiwot Sisay; Ethiopia	6.23 (NR)
Triple jump	Petrusa Swart; South Africa	12.95w	Béryl Laramé; Seychelles	12.20w	Sonya Agbéssi; Benin	12.02w
Shot put	Louise Meintjies; South Africa	14.66	Elizabeth Olaba; Kenya	14.42	Luzanda Swanepoel; South Africa	14.23
Discus throw	Lizette Etsebeth; South Africa	54.16	Nanette van der Walt; South Africa	51.58	Sandra Willms; South Africa	50.56
Javelin throw	Liezl Roux; South Africa	48.24	Rhona Dwinger; South Africa	47.60	Michelle Bradbury; South Africa	43.92
Heptathlon	Chrisna Oosthuizen; South Africa	5339	Maralize Visser; South Africa	5159	Caroline Kola; Kenya	4925

== Medal table ==
Rank	Nation	Gold	Silver	Bronze	Total
1	South Africa (SAF)	15	16	19	50
2	Nigeria (NGR)	8	9	1	18
3	Kenya (KEN)	8	5	4	17
4	Ethiopia (ETH)	2	4	6	12
5	Algeria (ALG)	2	1	0	3
5	Madagascar (MAD)	2	1	0	3
7	Mozambique (MOZ)	2	0	0	2
8	Ghana (GHA)	1	1	3	5
9	Central African Republic (CAF)	1	0	0	1
10	Ivory Coast (CIV)	0	2	0	2
11	Mauritius (MRI)	0	1	1	2
11	Seychelles (SEY)	0	1	1	2
13	Senegal (SEN)	0	0	3	3
14	Benin (BEN)	0	0	1	1
14	Burundi (BDI)	0	0	1	1
14	Egypt (EGY)	0	0	1	1
Totals (16 entries)		41	41	41	123

== See also ==
- 1993 in athletics (track and field)
