= George Ogbeide =

Nigerian long jumper

Personal information
- Born: 4 August 1968 (age 58) Lagos, Nigeria

Sport
- Sport: Track and field
Medal record
Representing Nigeria
Summer Universiade
Silver medal – second place	1991 Sheffield	Long jump
All-Africa Games
Gold medal – first place	1991 Cairo	Long jump

George Ogbeide (born 4 August 1968) is a retired Nigerian long jumper. He won the silver medal at the 1991 Summer Universiade and the gold at the 1991 All-Africa Games.

Ogbeide finished fourth in 4 x 100 metres relay at the 1991 World Championships with teammates Olapade Adeniken, Victor Omagbemi and Davidson Ezinwa.

His personal best jump was 8.24 metres, achieved in July 1991 in Cottbus. This ranks him fourth among Nigerian long jumpers, behind Yusuf Alli (8.27 m), Charlton Ehizuelen (8.26 m indoor) and Paul Emordi (8.25 m).

Representing the Washington State Cougars track and field team, Ogbeide also won the 1991 American collegiate (NCAA) long jump title with a leap of 8.13 metres. He had earlier competed for the Idaho Vandals track and field team.

== Achievements ==
Year	Competition	Venue	Position	Event	Notes
Representing Nigeria
1991	Summer Universiade	Sheffield, United Kingdom	2nd	Long jump	8.08 m
1991	All-Africa Games	Cairo, Egypt	1st	Long jump	8.22 m
1991	World Championships	Tokyo, Japan	13th	Long jump	7.78 m
1991	World Championships	Tokyo, Japan	4th	4 × 100 m relay	38.43 s
