= Tracy Goddard =

British athlete (born 1969)

Tracy Joseph née Goddard
Personal information
- Nationality: British (English)
- Born: 29 November 1969 (age 56)
- Years active: 1987–1998

Sport
- Sport: Athletics
- Events: 4 × 400 metres relay Long jump
- Club: Basingstoke AC

Achievements and titles
- Commonwealth finals: 1994, 1998
Medal record
Representing Great Britain
European Junior Championships
Bronze medal – third place	1987 Birmingham	4 x 400 m
World Championships
Bronze medal – third place	1993 Stuttgart	4 x 400 m
European Cup
Gold medal – first place	1994 Birmingham	4 x 400 m
Representing England
Commonwealth Games
Gold medal – first place	1994 Victoria	4 x 400 m

Tracy Carol Joseph (née Goddard, born 29 November 1969) is a British former athlete who competed in the 400 metres and long jump. She won a bronze medal 4 × 400 metres relay at the 1993 World Championships representing Great Britain, and a gold medal in the 4 × 400 metres relay at the 1994 Commonwealth Games representing England. She was also a member of the British quartet that won at the 1994 European Cup.

== Career ==
In 1991, Goddard came second behind Sandra Leigh in the 400 metres event at the 1991 UK Athletics Championships. Goddard competed at the 1993 World Championships in Athletics in Stuttgart, winning a bronze medal in the 4 × 400 metres relay, competing with Linda Keough, Phylis Smith and Sally Gunnell.

Goddard finished second behind Melanie Neef in the 400 metres event at the 1994 AAA Championships. Shortly afterwards she was in the England team that won the 4 x 400 metres relay at the 1994 Commonwealth Games in Victoria, along with Keough, Smith and Gunnell, after the Australian team were disqualified.

Joseph came third in the long jump event at the 1997 British Athletics Championships, and fifth in the long jump event at the 1998 Commonwealth Games.

== International competitions ==
Representing Great Britain
Year	Competition	Venue	Position	Event	Notes
1987	European Junior Championships	Birmingham, United Kingdom	4th	400 m	54.18
1987	European Junior Championships	Birmingham, United Kingdom	3rd	4 × 4 00m	3:39.84
1993	World Championships	Stuttgart, Germany	3rd	4 × 400 m	3:23.41
1994	European Cup	Birmingham, United Kingdom	1st	4 × 400 m	3:27.33

Representing England
Year	Competition	Venue	Position	Event	Notes
1994	Commonwealth Games	Victoria, Canada	12th (sf)	400 m	53.84
1994	Commonwealth Games	Victoria, Canada	1st	4 × 400 m	3:27.06
1998	Commonwealth Games	Kuala Lumpur, Malaysia	5th	Long jump	6.35 m
(sf) Indicates overall position in semifinal round
