= Renee Poetschka =

Australian athlete

Personal information
- Full name: Renee Elise Poetschka
- Nationality: Australian
- Born: 1 May 1971 (age 55) Dampier, Western Australia
- Height: 174 cm (5 ft 9 in)
- Weight: 56 kg (123 lb)

Sport
- Sport: Track and field
- Events: 400 metres 400 metres hurdles

Achievements and titles
- Highest world ranking: 9th
- Personal bests: 11.62s–100 m 23.06s–200 m 50.19s–400 m 57.04–400 m Hurdles
Medal record
Women's athletics
Representing Australia
World Championships
Bronze medal – third place	1995 Gothenburg	4x400 m relay
World Junior Championships
Gold medal – first place	1990 Plovdiv	4x400 m relay

Renee Elise Poetschka (born 1 May 1971) is a former Australian athlete. Best known as a relay runner, she won a bronze medal at the World Champion in the 4x400 metres relay and a gold medal in the same event at the World Junior Championships.

== Athletic career ==
A five-time National Champion in the individual 400 metres, she was twice ranked in the World's Top Ten by Track and Field News in 1995 (9th) and 1996 (10th).

At the 1993 Australian National Championships, Poetschka also won the 400m Hurdles. Her younger sister, Lauren later became national champion in the hurdles event and represented Australia at the Olympic Games.

== Achievements ==
Year	Competition	Venue	Position	Event	Notes
Representing Australia
1990	World Junior Championships	Plovdiv, Bulgaria	18th (h)	400m	55.18
1990	World Junior Championships	Plovdiv, Bulgaria	1st	4 × 400 m relay	3:30.38
1991	World Championships	Tokyo, Japan	14th	400 m	52.76
1992	Olympic Games	Barcelona, Spain	15th	400 m	52.09
1992	Olympic Games	Barcelona, Spain	7th	4 × 400 m relay	3:26.42
1993	World Indoor Championships	Toronto, Canada	5th	400 m	52.29
1994	Commonwealth Games	Victoria, Canada	5th	400 m	51.51
1994	Commonwealth Games	Victoria, Canada	—	4 × 400 m relay	DQ
1995	World Championships	Gothenburg, Sweden	9th	400 m	51.00
1995	World Championships	Gothenburg, Sweden	3rd	4 × 400 m relay	3:25.88
1996	Olympic Games	Atlanta, United States	15th	400 m	51.49
1996	Olympic Games	Atlanta, United States	11th	4 × 400 m relay	3:33.78

=== Personal bests ===
- 100 metres – 11.62 s (1996)
- 200 metres – 23.06 s (1995)
- 400 metres – 50.19 s (1994)
- 400 metres hurdles – 57.04 s (1993)
