= Carole Nelson =

French athletics competitor

Personal information
- Born: 27 January 1971 (age 55) Paris, France
- Years active: 1990s
- Height: 162 cm (5 ft 4 in)
- Weight: 51 kg (112 lb)

Sport
- Country: France
- Sport: Athletics
- Event: 400 m hurdles

Carole Nelson (born 27 January 1971 in Paris) is a former French athlete, who specialized in the 400 meters hurdles.

== Career ==
Nelson was from French Guiana, where she trained under Louis Lafontaine. She started competing at the junior level in the late 1980s, and later trained with Stéphane Caristan.

She won the 400m hurdles at the annual French Athletic Championships three times: in 1992, 1993 and 1994.

In 1993, she won the bronze medal at the Mediterranean Games, in Narbonne.

She continued to compete at the senior level, and in 1998 moved to Paris from Cayenne to escape the political turmoil in Guiana.

=== Records ===
Personal Bests
Event	Performance	Location	Date
400 m hurdles	56 s 61	Villeneuve-d'Ascq	18 July 1992

== Sources ==
- Docathlé2003, Fédération française d'athlétisme, 2003, p. 423
