= Olga Mutanda =

Ivorian sprinter

Personal information
- Nationality: Ivorian
- Born: 3 April 1967
- Died: 27 February 2014 (aged 46)

Sport
- Sport: Sprinting
- Event: 200 metres

Olga Mutanda (3 April 1967 – 27 February 2014) was an Ivorian sprinter. She competed in the women's 200 metres at the 1992 Summer Olympics.
