= Manitoba High Schools Athletics Association =

Governing body for high school sport in Manitoba

Manitoba High Schools Athletic Association
- Abbreviation: MHSAA
- Legal status: Association
- Purpose: High School Athletics
- Official language: English and French
- Website: www.mhsaa.ca

Manitoba High Schools Athletics Association oversees high school athletic competitions in the Canadian province of Manitoba. It also has a hall of fame.

== Discrimination against girls ==
The MHSAA was forced to allow girls to play on boys' teams (mixed gender teams are now known as co-ed teams) as the result of a court case.

== Notable coaches ==
- Michelle Sawatzky-Koop, Steinbach Regional Secondary School
