= Nelli Voronkova =

Belarusian hurdler

Personal information
- Nationality: Belarusian
- Born: 30 June 1972 (age 54)

Sport
- Sport: Track and field
- Event: 400 metres hurdles

Nelli Voronkova (born 30 June 1972) is a Belarusian hurdler. She competed in the women's 400 metres hurdles at the 1996 Summer Olympics.
