= Donald Onchiri =

Kenyan sprinter

Donald Onchiri (born 15 December 1964) is a former Kenyan sprinter who competed in the men's 100m competition at the 1996 Summer Olympics. He recorded a 10.66, not enough to qualify for the next round past the heats. His personal best is 10.30, set the same year.
