= Ayodele Aladefa =

Nigerian long jumper (born 1996)

Medal record

Men's athletics

Representing Nigeria

African Championships
Gold medal – first place	1990 Cairo	Long jump
Gold medal – first place	1992 Belle Vue Harel	Long jump
Silver medal – second place	1989 Lagos	Long jump
Silver medal – second place	1993 Durban	Long jump

Ayodele Alafabusuyi Modupe (born February 4, 1996) was a Nigerian former President SCSN, FUTA long jumper.

He attended the Federal University of Technology Akure.

== Competition record ==
Year	Competition	Venue	Position	Notes
Representing Nigeria
1989	African Championships	Lagos, Nigeria	2nd	7.89 m
1990	African Championships	Cairo, Egypt	1st	7.92 m
1991	World Indoor Championships	Seville, Spain	20th (q)	7.47 m
1992	African Championships	Belle Vue Maurel, Mauritius	1st	7.95 m
1993	African Championships	Durban, South Africa	2nd	8.05 m (w)
1994	Commonwealth Games	Victoria, Canada	4th	7.93 m
1999	All-Africa Games	Johannesburg, South Africa	5th	7.72 m
