= Hassan Bosso =

Nigerian sprinter

Medal record

Men's athletics

Representing Nigeria

African Championships
Gold medal – first place	1990 Cairo	4×400 m
Silver medal – second place	1993 Durban	4×400 m

Hassan Bosso (born 10 September 1969) is a retired Nigerian sprinter.

Bosso finished fifth in 4 x 400 metres relay at the 1992 Summer Olympics with teammates Emmanuel Okoli, Sunday Bada and Udeme Ekpeyong.
