= Eugene Koranteng =

Ghanaian triple jumper

Personal information
- Born: 20 December 1966 (age 59)

Sport
- Sport: Track and field
Medal record
Representing Ghana
African Championships
Gold medal – first place	1989 Lagos	Triple jump

Eugene Koranteng (born 20 December 1966) is a retired Ghanaian triple jumper.

Koranteng competed for the George Mason Patriots track and field team in the NCAA.

He won the gold medal at the 1989 African Championships, with a jump of 16.83 metres (55 ft 3 in). This was his career best jump. He later competed at the 1991 World Championships, but failed to get a valid mark.
