= Elinda Vorster =

South African sprinter (born 1965)

Personal information
- Born: 8 September 1965 (age 61) Cape Town, South Africa
- Height: 1.67 m (5 ft 6 in)
- Weight: 54 kg (119 lb)

Sport
- Sport: Track and field
- Events: 100 m, 200 m
Medal record
Women's athletics
Representing South Africa
African Championships
Gold medal – first place	1992 Belle Vue Harel	100 m
Gold medal – first place	1992 Belle Vue Harel	200 m
Gold medal – first place	1992 Belle Vue Harel	4×100 m
Silver medal – second place	1993 Durban	100 m
Bronze medal – third place	1993 Durban	4×100 m

Elinda Vorster (née Rademeyer; born 8 September 1965 in Cape Town) is a retired South African athlete who specialised in sprinting events. She represented her country at the 1992 Summer Olympics and the 1993 World Championships.

Her personal bests are 11.22 seconds in the 100 metres (+1.4 m/s, Germiston 1990) and 22.58 seconds in the 200 metres (+1.2 m/s, Germiston 1990).

== Competition record ==
Year	Competition	Venue	Position	Event	Notes
Representing South Africa
1992	African Championships	Belle Vue Maurel, Mauritius	1st	100 m	11.26
1992	African Championships	Belle Vue Maurel, Mauritius	1st	200 m	23.60
1992	Olympic Games	Barcelona, Spain	11th (sf)	100 m	11.44
1992	Olympic Games	Barcelona, Spain	14th (sf)	200 m	23.08
1993	African Championships	Durban, South Africa	2nd	100 m	11.45
1993	World Championships	Stuttgart, Germany	9th (sf)	100 m	11.22
1993	World Championships	Stuttgart, Germany	11th (sf)	200 m	22.83
