= James Sabulei =

Kenyan triple jumper

Medal record

Men's athletics

Representing Kenya

African Championships
Silver medal – second place	1990 Cairo	Triple jump
Bronze medal – third place	1993 Durban	Long jump

James Sabulei (born 12 April 1969) is a Kenyan former triple jumper who competed in the 1992 Summer Olympics.
