= Agnetha Chelimo =

Kenyan racewalker

Medal record

Women's athletics

Representing Kenya

All-Africa Games
Gold medal – first place	1987 Nairobi	5000 m walk
Gold medal – first place	1991 Cairo	5000 m walk

African Championships
Gold medal – first place	1989 Lagos	5000 m walk
Gold medal – first place	1990 Cairo	5000 m walk

Agnetha Chelimo (born 28 May 1974) is a Kenyan former racewalker. She was a four-time African champion in the discipline.

== Career ==
As a teenager she led the development of women's racewalking in Africa. At thirteen she was the gold medallist in the inaugural women's 5000 metres race walk at the 1987 All-Africa Games, ahead of two other Kenyan athletes. She returned four years later to claim the second title, finishing several seconds ahead of fellow Kenyan Grace Karimi and Algeria's Dounia Kara, who was to succeed her in 1995.

She was also a leading athlete in the development of the event at the African Championships in Athletics, winning the second and third editions of the 5000 m walk championship in 1989 and 1990.

She entered the 5000 m walk at the 1988 World Junior Championships in Athletics and placed thirteenth. Between 1986 and 1991 she won five Kenyan national titles in racewalking.

== International competitions ==
Year	Competition	Venue	Position	Event	Notes
1987	All-Africa Games	Nairobi, Kenya	1st	5000 m walk	25:38.91 GR
1989	African Championships	Lagos, Nigeria	1st	5000 m walk	26:36.18
1990	African Championships	Cairo, Egypt	1st	5000 m walk	25:45.2 CR
1991	All-Africa Games	Cairo, Egypt	1st	5000 m walk	24:25.00 GR

== National titles ==
- Kenyan Athletics Championships
  - 5000 m track walk: 1986, 1987, 1988
  - 10,000 m track walk: 1989, 1991
