= Joseph Diaz (sprinter) =

Senegalese sprinter

Personal information
- Nationality: Senegalese
- Born: 25 November 1969 (age 56)

Sport
- Sport: Sprinting
- Event: 4 × 100 metres relay
Medal record
Men's athletics
Representing Senegal
African Championships
Silver medal – second place	1990 Cairo	4×100 m
Bronze medal – third place	1988 Annaba	4×100 m

Joseph Diaz (born 25 November 1969) is a Senegalese sprinter. He competed in the men's 4 × 100 metres relay at the 1988 Summer Olympics.
