= Omotayo Akinremi =

Nigerian sprinter and hurdler

Personal information
- Nationality: Nigerian
- Born: Omotayo Akinremi; 13 September 1974 (age 51)
- Occupation(s): sprinter and hurdler

Sport
- Country: Nigeria
Medal record
Women's athletics
Representing Nigeria
African Championships
Gold medal – first place	1990 Cairo	4×400 m
Gold medal – first place	1992 Belle Vue Harel	400 m
Gold medal – first place	1992 Belle Vue Harel	4×400 m
Gold medal – first place	1993 Durban	400 m hurdles
Gold medal – first place	1993 Durban	4×400 m
Bronze medal – third place	1990 Cairo	400 m hurdles
All-Africa Games
Bronze medal – third place	1991 Cairo	400 m hurdles
Oceania Championships
Gold medal – first place	2000 Adelaide	200 m (exhibition)
Summer Universiade
Bronze medal – third place	1993 Amherst	4 x 400 m relay

Omotayo "Tayo" Akinremi (born 13 September 1974) is a Nigerian former sprinter and hurdler. She competed in local and international competitions in athletics representing Nigeria. She won gold medals at the 1992 and 1993 African Championships in Athletics at 400 metres hurdles, she also won bronze medal at the 1990 event, and during the 1991 All-Africa Games she won bronze medals in the 400m hurdles. Emily also won the 200 metres at the 2000 Oceania Athletics Championships. Furthermore, she participated in the Nigerian 4 × 400 m relay team that won bronze medals at the 1993 Summer Universiade with Olabisi Afolabi, Omolade Akinremi and Onyinye Chikezie.

Her sisters Omolade "Lade" Akinremi and Christy "Taiye" Akinremi were also athletes. They all ran for the Alabama A&M Bulldogs before transferring to the Arizona State Sun Devils program.

== Achievements ==
=== World Junior Championships in Athletics ===
Year	Competition	Venue	Position	Event	Notes
Representing Nigeria
1990	World Junior Championships	Plovdiv, Bulgaria	3rd	4 × 400 m relay	3:33.56

=== African Championships in Athletics ===
Year	Competition	Venue	Position	Event	Notes
Representing Nigeria
1990	African Championships	Cairo, Egypt	3rd	400 metres hurdles	57.43

Year	Competition	Venue	Position	Event	Notes
Representing Nigeria
1992	African Championships	Belle Vue Maurel, Mauritius	1st	400 m	52.53

Year	Competition	Venue	Position	Event	Notes
Representing Nigeria
1993	African Championships	Durban, South Africa	1st	400 m hurdles	57.59

=== African Games ===
Year	Competition	Venue	Position	Event	Notes
Representing Nigeria
1991	All-Africa Games	Cairo, Egypt	3rd	400 m hurdles	58:85

=== Summer Universiade ===
Year	Competition	Venue	Position	Event	Notes
Representing Nigeria
1993	Universiade	Buffalo, United States	7th	400 m hurdles	58.47

== Personal bests ==
- 400 metres hurdles – 57.59 s (1992)
- 400 metres – 52.53 s (1993)

== See also ==
- Omolade Akinremi
