= Omolade Akinremi =

Nigerian hurdler

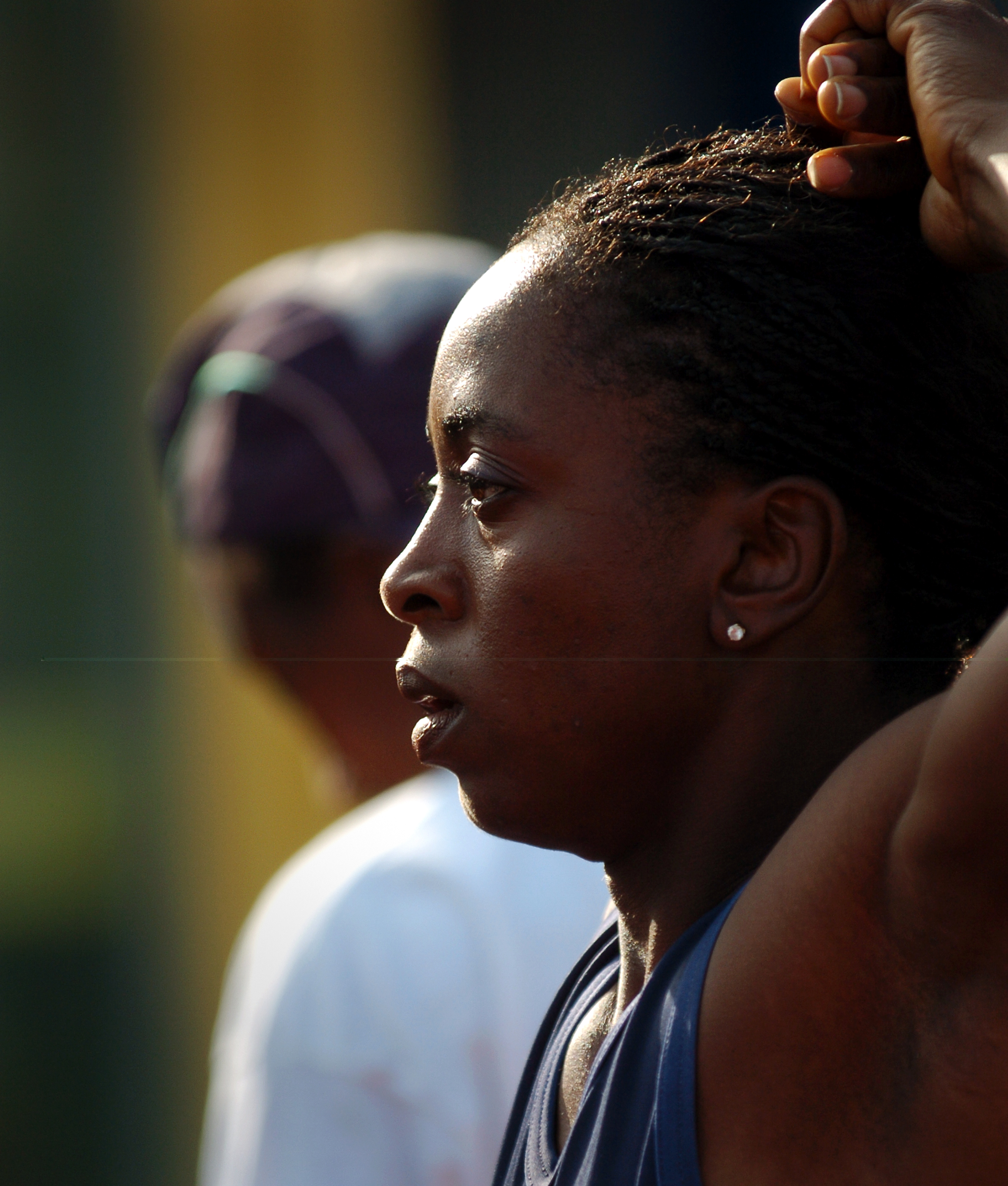
- Akinremi at the 2003 Military World Games

Personal information
- Born: 13 September 1974 (age 52)

Sport
- Sport: Track and field
Medal record
Representing Nigeria
African Championships
Gold medal – first place	1990 Cairo	4×400 m relay
Gold medal – first place	1992 Belle Vue Harel	4×400 m relay
Gold medal – first place	1993 Durban	4×400 m relay
Silver medal – second place	1990 Cairo	400 m hurdles
Bronze medal – third place	1992 Belle Vue Harel	400 m
Bronze medal – third place	1992 Belle Vue Harel	400 m hurdles
Summer Universiade
Bronze medal – third place	1993 Buffalo	4x400 m relay

Omolade "Lade" Akinremi (born 13 September 1974) is a retired Nigerian hurdler. She competed in the women's 400 metres hurdles at the 1996 Summer Olympics.

Akinremi was an All-American runner for the Arizona State Sun Devils track and field team, finishing runner-up in the 400 metres hurdles at the 1995 NCAA Division I Outdoor Track and Field Championships. Her sisters Omotayo Akinremi and Christy "Taiye" Akinremi were also athletes. They all ran for the Alabama A&M Bulldogs before transferring to the Arizona State Sun Devils program.

== Achievements ==
Year	Competition	Venue	Position	Event	Notes
Representing Nigeria
1990	World Junior Championships	Plovdiv, Bulgaria	3rd	400m hurdles	56.97
1990	World Junior Championships	Plovdiv, Bulgaria	1st (h)	4 × 400 m relay	3:33.56
1990	African Championships	Cairo, Egypt	3rd	400 m	57.97
1991	All-Africa Games	Cairo, Egypt	2nd	400 m hurdles	58.16
1992	African Championships	Belle Vue Maurel, Mauritius	3rd	400 m	53.14
1992	African Championships	Belle Vue Maurel, Mauritius	3rd	400 m hurdles	57.43
1993	Universiade	Buffalo, United States	7th	400 m hurdles	58.47
1993	Universiade	Buffalo, United States	3rd	4 × 400 m relay	3:34.97
1994	Commonwealth Games	Victoria, British Columbia, Canada	10th (sf)	400 m	53.20
1994	Commonwealth Games	Victoria, British Columbia, Canada	–	4 × 400 m relay	DQ
1995	World Championships	Gothenburg, Sweden	25th (h)	400 m	51.79
1995	World Championships	Gothenburg, Sweden	6th	4 × 400 m relay	3:27.85
1995	Universiade	Fukuoka, Japan	4th	400 m hurdles	56.11
1995	All-Africa Games	Harare, Zimbabwe	1st	400 m hurdles	56.1
1999	All-Africa Games	Johannesburg, South Africa	6th	400 m hurdles	59.53
2003	All-Africa Games	Abuja, Nigeria	1st	400 m hurdles	56.98
2004	African Championships	Brazzaville, Republic of the Congo	7th	400 m hurdles	59.08

=== Personal bests ===
- 400 metres hurdles - 55.98 s (2001)
- 400 metres - 53.09 s (2001)
