= List of champions of the African Athletics Championships =

This is a list of champions, or event winners, of the African Championships in Athletics, a biennial athletics competition organized by the Confederation of African Athletics since 1979.

== Men ==
Men's African champions

Track running: 100 m – 200 m – 400 m – 800 m – 1500 m – 3000 m – 5000 m – 10,000 m
Hurdles: 110 m hurdles – 400 m hurdles – 3000 m steeplechase
Jumps: High jump – Long jump – Triple jump – Pole vault
Throws: Javelin – Discus – Shot put – Hammer
Relays: 4 × 100 m – 4 × 400 m
Road: 10,000 m walk – 20 km walk – Marathon

See also: Championship records

Key: Current Championships record

=== 100 m ===
Year	Athlete	Country
1979	Ernest Obeng	Ghana
1982	Ernest Obeng	Ghana
1984	Chidi Imo	Nigeria
1985	Chidi Imo	Nigeria
1988	John Myles-Mills	Ghana
1989	Amadou Mbagnick Mbaye	Senegal
1990	Joseph Gikonyo	Kenya
1992	Victor Omagbemi	Nigeria
1993	Daniel Effiong	Nigeria
1996	Seun Ogunkoya	Nigeria
1998	Seun Ogunkoya	Nigeria
2000	Abdul Aziz Zakari	Ghana
2002	Frankie Fredericks	Namibia
2004	Olusoji Fasuba	Nigeria
2006	Olusoji Fasuba	Nigeria
2008	Olusoji Fasuba	Nigeria
2010	Ben Youssef Meité	Ivory Coast
2012	Simon Magakwe	South Africa
2014	Hua Wilfried Koffi	Ivory Coast
2016	Ben Youssef Meïté	Ivory Coast
2018	Akani Simbine	South Africa
2022	Ferdinand Omanyala	Kenya
2024	Joseph Fahnbulleh	Liberia

=== 200 m ===
Year	Athlete	Country
1979	Edward Ofili	Nigeria
1982	Boubacar Diallo	Senegal
1984	Innocent Egbunike	Nigeria
1985	Simon Kipkemboi	Kenya
1988	Davidson Ezinwa	Nigeria
1989	Olapade Adeniken	Nigeria
1990	Joseph Gikonyo	Kenya
1992	Victor Omagbemi	Nigeria
1993	Johan Rossouw	South Africa
1996	Oumar Loum	Senegal
1998	Frankie Fredericks	Namibia
2000	Abdul Aziz Zakari	Ghana
2002	Frankie Fredericks	Namibia
2004	Joseph Batangdon	Cameroon
2006	Uchenna Emedolu	Nigeria
2008	Thuso Mpuang	South Africa
2010	Amr Ibrahim Mostafa Seoud	Egypt
2012	Ben Youssef Meité	Ivory Coast
2014	Hua Wilfried Koffi	Ivory Coast
2016	Wayde van Niekerk	South Africa
2018	Ncincihli Titi	South Africa
2022	Letsile Tebogo	Botswana
2024	Joseph Fahnbulleh	Liberia

=== 400 m ===
Year	Athlete	Country
1979	El Kashief Hassan	Sudan
1982	Amadou Dia Bâ	Senegal
1984	Gabriel Tiacoh	Ivory Coast
1985	Innocent Egbunike	Nigeria
1988	Innocent Egbunike	Nigeria
1989	Gabriel Tiacoh	Ivory Coast
1990	Samson Kitur	Kenya
1992	Bobang Phiri	South Africa
1993	Kennedy Ochieng	Kenya
1996	Ibrahima Wade	Senegal
1998	Clement Chukwu	Nigeria
2000	Eric Milazar	Mauritius
2002	Eric Milazar	Mauritius
2004	Eric Milazar	Mauritius
2006	Gary Kikaya	Democratic Republic of the Congo
2008	Nagmeldin Ali Abubakr	Sudan
2010	Mohamed Khouaja	Libya
2012	Isaac Makwala	Botswana
2014	Isaac Makwala	Botswana
2016	Baboloki Thebe	Botswana
2018	Baboloki Thebe	Botswana
2022	Muzala Samukonga	Zambia
2024	Cheikh Tidiane Diouf	Senegal

=== 800 m ===
Year	Athlete	Country
1979	James Maina	Kenya
1982	Juma Ndiwa	Kenya
1984	Sammy Koskei	Kenya
1985	Sammy Koskei	Kenya
1988	Babacar Niang	Senegal
1989	Nixon Kiprotich	Kenya
1990	William Tanui	Kenya
1992	Charles Nkazamyampi	Burundi
1993	Sammy Langat	Kenya
1996	Fred Onyancha	Kenya
1998	Japheth Kimutai	Kenya
2000	Djabir Saïd Guerni	Algeria
2002	Djabir Saïd Guerni	Algeria
2004	William Yiampoy	Kenya
2006	Alex Kipchirchir	Kenya
2008	David Rudisha	Kenya
2010	David Rudisha	Kenya
2012	Taoufik Makhloufi	Algeria
2014	Nijel Amos	Botswana
2016	Nijel Amos	Botswana
2018	Nijel Amos	Botswana
2022	Slimane Moula	Algeria
2024	Ngeno Kipngetich	Kenya

=== 1500 m ===
Year	Athlete	Country
1979	Mike Boit	Kenya
1982	Kip Cheruiyot	Kenya
1984	Saïd Aouita	Morocco
1985	Omer Khalifa	Sudan
1988	Getahun Ayana	Ethiopia
1989	Joseph Chesire	Kenya
1990	Moses Kiptanui	Kenya
1992	Nelson Chirchir	Kenya
1993	David Kibet	Kenya
1996	Moses Kigen	Kenya
1998	Laban Rotich	Kenya
2000	Youssef Baba	Morocco
2002	Bernard Lagat	Kenya
2004	Paul Korir	Kenya
2006	Alex Kipchirchir	Kenya
2008	Haron Keitany	Kenya
2010	Asbel Kiprop	Kenya
2012	Caleb Mwangangi Ndiku	Kenya
2014	Ayanleh Souleiman	Djibouti
2016	Fouad Elkaam	Morocco
2018	Elijah Manangoi	Kenya
2022	Abel Kipsang	Kenya
2024	Brian Komen	Kenya

=== 3000 m ===
Year	Athlete	Country
1998	Tom Nyariki	Kenya

=== 5000 m ===
Year	Athlete	Country
1979	Miruts Yifter	Ethiopia
1982	Wodajo Bulti	Ethiopia
1984	Abderrazak Bounour	Algeria
1985	Wodajo Bulti	Ethiopia
1988	Brahim Boutayeb	Morocco
1989	John Ngugi	Kenya
1990	Ezequeil Bitok	Kenya
1992	James Songok	Kenya
1993	Simon Chemoiywo	Kenya
1996	Paul Koech	Kenya
1998	Daniel Komen	Kenya
2000	Ali Saïdi Sief	Algeria
2002	Paul Bitok	Kenya
2004	Zwedo Maregu	Ethiopia
2006	Kenenisa Bekele	Ethiopia
2008	Kenenisa Bekele	Ethiopia
2010	Edwin Soi	Kenya
2012	Mark Kiptoo	Kenya
2014	Caleb Mwangangi Ndiku	Kenya
2016	Douglas Kipserem	Kenya
2018	Edward Zakayo	Kenya
2022	Hailemariyam Amare	Ethiopia
2024	Mohamed Ismail Ibrahim	Djibouti

=== 10,000 m ===
Year	Athlete	Country
1979	Miruts Yifter	Ethiopia
1982	Mohamed Kedir	Ethiopia
1984	Kipsubai Koskei	Kenya
1985	Wodajo Bulti	Ethiopia
1988	Brahim Boutayeb	Morocco
1989	Addis Abebe	Ethiopia
1990	Khalid Skah	Morocco
1992	Josphat Machuka	Kenya
1993	William Sigei	Kenya
1996	Stephen Kiogora	Kenya
2000	Abraha Hadush	Ethiopia
2002	Paul Malakwen Kosgei	Kenya
2004	Charles Kamathi	Kenya
2006	Moses Kipsiro	Uganda
2008	Gebregziabher Gebremariam	Ethiopia
2010	Wilson Kiprop	Kenya
2012	Kenneth Kipkemoi	Kenya
2014	Nguse Amlosom	Eritrea
2016	Stephen Mokoka	South Africa
2018	Jemal Yimer	Ethiopia
2022	Mogos Tuemay	Ethiopia
2024	Nibret Melak	Ethiopia

=== Marathon ===
Year	Athlete	Country
1979	Kebede Balcha	Ethiopia
1982	Juma Ikangaa	Tanzania
1985	Ahmed Salah	Djibouti
1988	Dereje Nedi	Ethiopia
1989	Tsegaye Sengni	Ethiopia
1990	Tesfaye Tafa	Ethiopia

=== 10,000 metres walk ===
Year	Athlete	Country
1979	Benamar Kachkouche	Algeria

=== 20 km walk ===
Year	Athlete	Country
1982	Shemsu Hassan	Ethiopia
1984	Abdelwahab Ferguène	Algeria
1985	Abdelwahab Ferguène	Algeria
1988	Mohamed Bouhalla	Algeria
1989	Mohamed Bouhalla	Algeria
1990	Shemsu Hassan	Ethiopia
1992	Chris Britz	South Africa
1993	Getachew Demisse	Ethiopia
1996	Hatem Ghoula	Tunisia
1998	Hatem Ghoula	Tunisia
2000	Hatem Ghoula	Tunisia
2002	Hatem Ghoula	Tunisia
2004	Julius Sawe	Kenya
2006	David Kimutai	Kenya
2008	Mohamed Ameur	Algeria
2010	Hassanine Sebei	Tunisia
2012	Hédi Teraoui	Tunisia
2014	Lebogang Shange	South Africa
2016	Samuel Gathimba	Kenya
2018	Lebogang Shange	South Africa
2022	Samuel Gathimba	Kenya
2024	Misgana Wakuma	Ethiopia

=== 110 m hurdles ===
Year	Athlete	Country
1979	Godwin Obasogie	Nigeria
1982	Philip Sang	Kenya
1984	Philip Sang	Kenya
1985	René Djédjémel Mélédjé	Ivory Coast
1988	Noureddine Tadjine	Algeria
1989	Ikechukwu Mbadugha	Nigeria
1990	Moses Oyiki Orode	Nigeria
1992	Judex Lefou	Mauritius
1993	Kobus Schoeman	South Africa
1996	William Erese	Nigeria
1998	Shaun Bownes	South Africa
2000	Joseph-Berlioz Randriamihaja	Madagascar
2002	Shaun Bownes	South Africa
2004	Todd Matthews Jouda	Sudan
2006	Aymen Ben Ahmed	Tunisia
2008	Hennie Kotze	South Africa
2010	Othman Hadj Lazib	Algeria
2012	Lehann Fourie	South Africa
2012	Mark Kiptoo	Kenya
2014	Tyron Akins	Nigeria
2016	Antonio Alkana	South Africa
2018	Antonio Alkana	South Africa
2022	Amine Bouanani	Algeria
2024	Louis François Mendy	Senegal

=== 400 m hurdles ===
Year	Athlete	Country
1979	Daniel Kimaiyo	Kenya
1982	Amadou Dia Bâ	Senegal
1984	Amadou Dia Bâ	Senegal
1985	Amadou Dia Bâ	Senegal
1988	Amadou Dia Bâ	Senegal
1989	Henry Amike	Nigeria
1990	Hamidou Mbaye	Senegal
1992	Dries Vorster	South Africa
1993	Erick Keter	Kenya
1996	Ibou Faye	Senegal
1998	Samuel Matete	Zambia
2000	Sylvester Omodiale	Nigeria
2002	Llewellyn Herbert	South Africa
2004	Llewellyn Herbert	South Africa
2006	L. J. van Zyl	South Africa
2008	L. J. van Zyl	South Africa
2010	L. J. van Zyl	South Africa
2012	Amaechi Morton	Nigeria
2014	Cornel Fredericks	South Africa
2016	Boniface Tumuti	Kenya
2018	Abdelmalik Lahoulou	Algeria
2022	Sokwakhana Zazini	South Africa
2024	Victor Ntweng	Botswana

=== 3000 m steeplechase ===
Year	Athlete	Country
1979	Kip Rono	Kenya
1982	Eshetu Tura	Ethiopia
1984	Joshua Kipkemboi	Kenya
1985	Julius Kariuki	Kenya
1988	Azzedine Brahmi	Algeria
1989	Azzedine Brahmi	Algeria
1990	Abdelaziz Sahere	Morocco
1992	Whaddon Niewoudt	South Africa
1993	Joseph Keter	Kenya
1996	Kipkemboi Cheruiyot	Kenya
1998	Bernard Barmasai	Kenya
2000	Lotfi Turki	Tunisia
2002	Brahim Boulami	Morocco
2004	David Chemweno	Kenya
2006	Paul Kipsiele Koech	Kenya
2008	Richard Mateelong	Kenya
2010	Richard Mateelong	Kenya
2012	Abel Mutai	Kenya
2014	Jairus Birech	Kenya
2016	Chala Beyo	Ethiopia
2018	Conseslus Kipruto	Kenya
2022	Hailemariyam Amare	Ethiopia
2024	Leonard Chemutai	Uganda

=== High jump ===
Year	Athlete	Country
1979	Othmane Belfaa	Algeria
1982	Moussa Sagna Fall	Senegal
1984	Mohamed Aghlal	Morocco
1985	Moussa Sagna Fall	Senegal
1988	Boubacar Guèye	Senegal
1990	Othmane Belfaa	Algeria
1992	Othmane Belfaa	Algeria
1993	Flippie van Vuuren	South Africa
1996	Khemraj Naiko	Mauritius
1998	Abderrahmane Hammad	Algeria
2000	Abderrahmane Hammad	Algeria
2002	Abderrahmane Hammad	Algeria
2004	Kabelo Mmono	Botswana
2006	Kabelo Kgosiemang	Botswana
2008	Kabelo Kgosiemang	Botswana
2010	Kabelo Kgosiemang	Botswana
2012	Kabelo Kgosiemang	Botswana
2014	Kabelo Kgosiemang	Botswana
2016	Mathieu Sawe	Kenya
2018	Mathew Sawe	Kenya
2022	Hichem Bouhanoun	Algeria
2024	Brian Raats	South Africa

=== Pole vault ===
Year	Athlete	Country
1979	Mohamed Bensaad	Algeria
1982	Loué Legbo	Ivory Coast
1984	Mohamed Bouihiri	Morocco
1985	Choukri Abahnini	Tunisia
1988	Choukri Abahnini	Tunisia
1989	Sami Si Mohamed	Algeria
1990	Ali Ziouani	Morocco
1992	Okkert Brits	South Africa
1993	Okkert Brits	South Africa
1996	Anis Riahi	Tunisia
1998	Okkert Brits	South Africa
2000	Rafik Mefti	Algeria
2002	Karim Sène	Senegal
2004	Béchir Zaghouani	Tunisia
2006	Okkert Brits	South Africa
2008	Mouhsin Cheouari	Morocco
2010	Hamdi Dhouibi	Tunisia
2012	Mouhcine Cheaouri	Tunisia
2014	Cheyne Rahme	South Africa
2016	Hichem Cherabi	Algeria
2018	Mohamed Romdhana	Tunisia
2022	Medhi Amar Rouana	Algeria
2024	Kyle Rademeyer	South Africa

=== Long jump ===
Year	Athlete	Country
1979	Ajayi Agbebaku	Nigeria
1982	Doudou N'Diaye	Senegal
1984	Paul Emordi	Nigeria
1985	Paul Emordi	Nigeria
1988	Yusuf Alli	Nigeria
1989	Yusuf Alli	Nigeria
1990	Ayodele Aladefa	Nigeria
1992	Ayodele Aladefa	Nigeria
1993	Obinna Eregbu	Nigeria
1996	Anis Gallali	Tunisia
1998	Hatem Mersal	Egypt
2000	Younès Moudrik	Morocco
2002	Younès Moudrik	Morocco
2004	Jonathan Chimier	Mauritius
2006	Ignisious Gaisah	Ghana
2008	Yahya Berrabah	Morocco
2010	Godfrey Khotso Mokoena	South Africa
2012	Ndiss Kaba Badji	Senegal
2014	Zarck Visser	South Africa
2016	Ruswahl Samaai	South Africa
2018	Rushwal Samaai	South Africa
2022	Thalosang Tshireletso	Botswana
2024	Cheswill Johnson	South Africa

=== Triple jump ===
Year	Athlete	Country
1979	Ajayi Agbebaku	Nigeria
1982	Mamadou Diallo	Senegal
1984	Joseph Taiwo	Nigeria
1985	Paul Emordi	Nigeria
1988	António Santos	Angola
1989	Eugene Koranteng	Ghana
1990	Toussaint Rabenala	Madagascar
1992	Toussaint Rabenala	Madagascar
1993	Toussaint Rabenala	Madagascar
1996	Paul Nioze	Seychelles
1998	Andrew Owusu	Ghana
2000	Andrew Owusu	Ghana
2002	Olivier Sanou	Burkina Faso
2004	Olivier Sanou	Burkina Faso
2006	Tarik Bouguetaïb	Morocco
2008	Ndiss Kaba Badji	Senegal
2010	Tosin Oke	Nigeria
2012	Tosin Oke	Nigeria
2014	Khotso Mokoena	South Africa
2016	Tosin Oke	Nigeria
2018	Hugues Zango	Burkina Faso
2022	Hugues Zango	Burkina Faso
2024	Hugues Zango	Burkina Faso

=== Shot put ===
Year	Athlete	Country
1979	Youssef Nagui Asaad	Egypt
1982	Youssef Nagui Asaad	Egypt
1984	Ahmed Mohamed Ashoush	Egypt
1985	Ahmed Mohamed Ashoush	Egypt
1988	Ahmed Mohamed Ashoush	Egypt
1989	Robert Welikhe	Kenya
1990	Robert Welikhe	Kenya
1992	Chima Ugwu	Nigeria
1993	Carel le Roux	South Africa
1996	Henk Booysen	South Africa
1998	Burger Lambrechts	South Africa
2000	Chima Ugwu	Nigeria
2002	Janus Robberts	South Africa
2004	Janus Robberts	South Africa
2006	Yasser Ibrahim Farag	Egypt
2008	Abdu Moaty Moustafa	Egypt
2010	Burger Lambrechts	South Africa
2012	Burger Lambrechts	South Africa
2014	Orazio Cremona	South Africa
2016	Jaco Engelbrecht	South Africa
2018	Chukwuebuka Enekwechi	Nigeria
2022	Chukwuebuka Enekwechi	Nigeria
2024	Chukwuebuka Enekwechi	Nigeria

=== Discus throw ===
Year	Athlete	Country
1979	Abderrazak Ben Hassine	Tunisia
1982	Mohamed Naguib Hamed	Egypt
1984	Mohamed Naguib Hamed	Egypt
1985	Christian Okoye	Nigeria
1988	Adewale Olukoju	Nigeria
1989	Hassan Ahmed Hamad	Egypt
1990	Hassan Ahmed Hamad	Egypt
1992	Adewale Olukoju	Nigeria
1993	Mickael Conjungo	Central African Republic
1996	Serge Doh	Ivory Coast
1998	Frantz Kruger	South Africa
2000	Frits Potgieter	South Africa
2002	Janus Robberts	South Africa
2004	Frantz Kruger	South Africa
2006	Omar Ahmed ElGazaly	Egypt
2008	Hannes Hopley	South Africa
2010	Omar Ahmed ElGazaly	Egypt
2012	Victor Hogan	South Africa
2014	Victor Hogan	South Africa
2016	Russell Tucker	South Africa
2018	Victor Hogan	South Africa
2022	Werner Visser	South Africa
2024	Oussama Khennoussi	Algeria

=== Hammer throw ===
Year	Athlete	Country
1979	Abdellah Boubekeur	Algeria
1982	Hisham Fouad Greiss	Egypt
1984	Hakim Toumi	Algeria
1985	Hakim Toumi	Algeria
1988	Hakim Toumi	Algeria
1989	Hakim Toumi	Algeria
1990	Sherif Farouk El Hennawi	Egypt
1992	Hakim Toumi	Algeria
1993	Hakim Toumi	Algeria
1996	Hakim Toumi	Algeria
1998	Chris Harmse	South Africa
2000	Samir Haouam	Algeria
2002	Chris Harmse	South Africa
2004	Chris Harmse	South Africa
2006	Chris Harmse	South Africa
2008	Chris Harmse	South Africa
2010	Mohsen El Anany	Egypt
2012	Chris Harmse	South Africa
2014	Mostafa Al-Gamel	Egypt
2016	Eslam Ahmed Taha Ibrahim	Egypt
2018	Mostafa Al-Gamel	Egypt
2022	Allan Cumming	South Africa
2024	Mostafa Al-Gamel	Egypt

=== Javelin throw ===
Year	Athlete	Country
1979	Jacques Ayé Abehi	Ivory Coast
1982	Zakayo Malekwa	Tanzania
1984	Tarek Chaabani	Tunisia
1985	Ahmed Mahour Bacha	Algeria
1988	Justin Arop	Uganda
1989	Pius Bazighe	Nigeria
1990	Fidèle Rakotonirina	Madagascar
1992	Tom Petranoff	South Africa
1993	Tom Petranoff	South Africa
1996	Pius Bazighe	Nigeria
1998	Marius Corbett	South Africa
2000	Maher Ridane	Tunisia
2002	Gerhardus Pienaar	South Africa
2004	Gerhardus Pienaar	South Africa
2006	Gerhardus Pienaar	South Africa
2008	Mohamed Ali Kebabou	Tunisia
2010	Eha El Sayed Abdelrahman	Egypt
2012	Julius Yego	Kenya
2014	Julius Yego	Kenya
2016	Phil-Mar van Rensburg	South Africa
2018	Julius Yego	Kenya
2022	Julius Yego	Kenya
2024	Julius Yego	Kenya

=== Decathlon ===
Year	Athlete	Country
1979	Mohamed Bensaad	Algeria
1982	Charles Kokoyo	Kenya
1984	Mourad Mahour Bacha	Algeria
1985	Mourad Mahour Bacha	Algeria
1988	Mahmoud Aït Ouhamou	Algeria
1989	Mourad Mahour Bacha	Algeria
1990	Abdennacer Moumen	Morocco
1992	Mourad Mahour Bacha	Algeria
1993	Pierre Faber	South Africa
1996	Anis Riahi	Tunisia
1998	Rédouane Youcef	Algeria
2000	Rédouane Youcef	Algeria
2002	Hamdi Dhouibi	Tunisia
2004	Anis Riahi	Tunisia
2006	Hamdi Dhouibi	Tunisia
2008	Larbi Bouraada	Algeria
2010	Larbi Bouraada	Algeria
2012	Ali Kamé	Madagascar
2014	Larbi Bourrada	Algeria
2016	Fredriech Pretorius	South Africa
2018	Larbi Bourrada	Algeria
2022	Larbi Bourrada	Algeria
2024	Larbi Bourrada	Algeria

=== 4 × 100 m relay ===
Year	Country
1979	Ivory Coast
1982	Ivory Coast
1984	Nigeria
1985	Nigeria
1988	Nigeria
1989	Nigeria
1990	Nigeria
1992	South Africa
1993	Ghana
1996	Nigeria
1998	Ivory Coast
2000	Ghana
2002	Nigeria
2004	Nigeria
2006	Nigeria
2008	South Africa
2010	South Africa
2012	South Africa
2014	South Africa
2016	South Africa
2018	South Africa
2022	Kenya
2024	Ghana

=== 4 × 400 m relay ===
Year	Country
1979	Kenya
1982	Kenya
1984	Senegal
1985	Kenya
1989	Ethiopia
1990	Kenya
1990	Nigeria
1992	South Africa
1993	Kenya
1996	Senegal
1998	Senegal
2000	Algeria
2002	Morocco
2004	Zimbabwe
2006	Kenya
2008	South Africa
2010	Kenya
2012	Nigeria
2014	Botswana
2016	Botswana
2018	Kenya
2022	Botswana
2024	Botswana

== Women ==
=== 100 m ===
Year	Athlete	Country
1979	Oguzoeme Nsenu	Nigeria
1982	Alice Adala	Kenya
1984	Doris Wiredu	Ghana
1985	Rufina Uba	Nigeria
1988	Mary Onyali	Nigeria
1989	Mary Onyali	Nigeria
1990	Onyinye Chikezie	Nigeria
1992	Elinda Vorster	South Africa
1993	Beatrice Utondu	Nigeria
1996	Georgette Nkoma	Cameroon
1998	Mary Onyali	Nigeria
2000	Myriam Léonie Mani	Cameroon
2002	Endurance Ojokolo	Nigeria
2004	Endurance Ojokolo	Nigeria
2006	Vida Anim	Ghana
2008	Damola Osayomi	Nigeria
2010	Blessing Okagbare	Nigeria
2012	Ruddy Zang Milama	Gabon
2014	Blessing Okagbare	Nigeria
2016	Murielle Ahouré	Ivory Coast
2018	Marie-Josée Ta Lou	Ivory Coast
2022	Gina Bass	Gambia
2024	Gina Bass	Gambia

=== 200 m ===
Year	Athlete	Country
1979	Hannah Afriyie	Ghana
1982	Nzaeli Kyomo	Tanzania
1984	Nawal El Moutawakil	Morocco
1985	Rufina Uba	Nigeria
1988	Falilat Ogunkoya	Nigeria
1989	Mary Onyali	Nigeria
1990	Fatima Yusuf	Nigeria
1992	Elinda Vorster	South Africa
1993	Mary Onyali	Nigeria
1996	Georgette Nkoma	Cameroon
1998	Falilat Ogunkoya	Nigeria
2000	Myriam Léonie Mani	Cameroon
2002	Nadjina Kaltouma	Chad
2004	Geraldine Pillay	South Africa
2006	Vida Anim	Ghana
2008	Isabel le Roux	South Africa
2010	Oludamola Osayomi	Nigeria
2012	Gloria Asumnu	Nigeria
2014	Murielle Ahouré	Ivory Coast
2016	Marie-Josée Ta Lou	Ivory Coast
2018	Marie-Josée Ta Lou	Ivory Coast
2022	Aminatou Seyni	Niger
2024	Jessika Gbai	Ivory Coast

=== 400 m ===
Year	Athlete	Country
1979	Grace Bakari	Ghana
1982	Ruth Atuti	Kenya
1984	Ruth Atuti	Kenya
1985	Kehinde Vaughan	Nigeria
1988	Airat Bakare	Nigeria
1989	Falilat Ogunkoya	Nigeria
1990	Fatima Yusuf	Nigeria
1992	Omotayo Akinremi	Nigeria
1993	Tina Paulino	Mozambique
1996	Saidat Onanuga	Nigeria
1998	Falilat Ogunkoya	Nigeria
2000	Amy Mbacké Thiam	Senegal
2002	Nadjina Kaltouma	Chad
2004	Fatou Bintou Fall	Senegal
2006	Amy Mbacké Thiam	Senegal
2008	Amantle Montsho	Botswana
2010	Amantle Montsho	Botswana
2012	Amantle Montsho	Botswana
2014	Folashade Abugan	Nigeria
2016	Kabange Mupopo	Zambia
2018	Caster Semenya	South Africa
2022	Miranda Coetzee	South Africa
2024	Miranda Coetzee	South Africa

=== 800 m ===
Year	Athlete	Country
1979	Mary Chemweno	Kenya
1982	Evelyn Adiru	Uganda
1984	Justina Chepchirchir	Kenya
1985	Selina Chirchir	Kenya
1988	Hassiba Boulmerka	Algeria
1989	Hassiba Boulmerka	Algeria
1990	Maria de Lurdes Mutola	Mozambique
1992	Zewde Haile Mariam	Ethiopia
1993	Maria de Lurdes Mutola	Mozambique
1996	Naomi Mugo	Kenya
1998	Maria de Lurdes Mutola	Mozambique
2000	Hasna Benhassi	Morocco
2002	Maria de Lurdes Mutola	Mozambique
2004	Saïda El Mehdi	Morocco
2006	Janeth Jepkosgei	Kenya
2008	Pamela Jelimo	Kenya
2010	Zahra Bouras	Algeria
2012	Francine Niyonsaba	Burundi
2014	Eunice Sum	Kenya
2016	Caster Semenya	South Africa
2018	Caster Semenya	South Africa
2022	Jarinter Mwasya	Kenya
2024	Sarah Moraa	Kenya

=== 1500 m ===
Year	Athlete	Country
1979	Sakina Boutamine	Algeria
1982	Justina Chepchirchir	Kenya
1984	Justina Chepchirchir	Kenya
1985	Mary Chemweno	Kenya
1988	Hassiba Boulmerka	Algeria
1989	Hassiba Boulmerka	Algeria
1990	Maria de Lurdes Mutola	Mozambique
1992	Elana Meyer	South Africa
1993	Elana Meyer	South Africa
1996	Naomi Mugo	Kenya
1998	Jackline Maranga	Kenya
2000	Nouria Mérah-Benida	Algeria
2002	Jackline Maranga	Kenya
2004	Nancy Jebet Lagat	Kenya
2006	Nouria Merah Benida	Algeria
2008	Gelete Burka	Ethiopia
2010	Nancy Jebet Lagat	Kenya
2012	Rabab Arafi	Morocco
2014	Hellen Obiri	Kenya
2016	Caster Semenya	South Africa
2018	Winny Chebet	Kenya
2022	Winny Chebet	Kenya
2024	Saron Berhe	Ethiopia

=== 3000 m ===
Year	Athlete	Country
1979	Sakina Boutamine	Algeria
1982	Justina Chepchirchir	Kenya
1984	Mary Chepkemboi	Kenya
1985	Hellen Kimaiyo	Kenya
1988	Fatima Aouam	Morocco
1989	Hellen Kimaiyo	Kenya
1990	Derartu Tulu	Ethiopia
1992	Derartu Tulu	Ethiopia
1993	Gwen Griffiths	South Africa
1998	Zahra Ouaziz	Morocco

=== 5000 m ===
Year	Athlete	Country
1996	Florence Djépé	Cameroon
1998	Berhane Adere	Ethiopia
2000	Asmae Leghzaoui	Morocco
2002	Berhane Adere	Ethiopia
2004	Etalemahu Kidane	Ethiopia
2006	Meseret Defar	Ethiopia
2008	Meselech Melkamu	Ethiopia
2010	Vivian Cheruiyot	Kenya
2012	Gladys Cherono	Kenya
2014	Almaz Ayana	Ethiopia
2016	Sheila Chepkirui	Kenya
2018	Hellen Obiri	Kenya
2022	Beatrice Chebet	Kenya
2024	Fantaye Belayneh	Ethiopia

=== 10,000 m ===
Year	Athlete	Country
1985	Hassania Darami	Morocco
1988	Marcianne Mukamurenzi	Rwanda
1989	Jane Ngotho	Kenya
1990	Derartu Tulu	Ethiopia
1992	Derartu Tulu	Ethiopia
1993	Berhane Adere	Ethiopia
2000	Souad Aït Salem	Algeria
2002	Susan Chepkemei	Kenya
2004	Eyerusalem Kuma	Ethiopia
2006	Edith Masai	Kenya
2008	Tirunesh Dibaba	Ethiopia
2010	Tirunesh Dibaba	Ethiopia
2012	Gladys Cherono	Kenya
2014	Joyce Chepkirui	Kenya
2016	Alice Aprot	Kenya
2018	Stacey Ndiwa	Kenya
2022	Caroline Nyaga	Kenya
2024	Gladys Kwamboka	Kenya

=== 5000 m walk ===
Year	Athlete	Country
1988	Sabiha Mansouri	Algeria
1989	Agnetha Chelimo	Kenya
1990	Agnetha Chelimo	Kenya
1992	Dounia Kara	Algeria
1993	Dounia Kara	Algeria
1996	Dounia Kara	Algeria
1998	Nagwa Ibrahim Ali	Egypt

=== 10 km walk ===
Year	Athlete	Country
2000	Bahia Boussad	Algeria
2002	Nagwa Ibrahim Ali	Egypt

=== 20 km walk ===
Year	Athlete	Country
2004	Grace Wanjiru	Kenya
2006	Nagwa Ibrahim Saleh	Egypt
2008	Grace Wanjiru	Kenya
2010	Grace Wanjiru	Kenya
2012	Grace Wanjiru	Kenya
2014	Grace Wanjiru	Kenya
2016	Grace Wanjiru	Kenya
2018	Yehualeye Beletew	Ethiopia
2022	Emily Ngii	Kenya
2024	Sintayehu Masire	Ethiopia

=== 100 m hurdles ===
Year	Athlete	Country
1979	Judy Bell-Gam	Nigeria
1982	Nawal El Moutawakil	Morocco
1984	Maria Usifo	Nigeria
1985	Maria Usifo	Nigeria
1988	Maria Usifo	Nigeria
1989	Dinah Yankey	Ghana
1990	Dinah Yankey	Ghana
1992	Ime Akpan	Nigeria
1993	Nicole Ramalalanirina	Madagascar
1996	Glory Alozie	Nigeria
1998	Glory Alozie	Nigeria
2000	Glory Alozie	Nigeria
2002	Lalanirina Rosa Rakotozafy	Madagascar
2004	Lalanirina Rosa Rakotozafy	Madagascar
2006	Toyin Augustus	Nigeria
2008	Fatmata Fofanah	Guinea
2010	Seun Adigun	Nigeria
2012	Gnima Faye	Senegal
2014	Rikenette Steenkamp	South Africa
2016	Claudia Heunis	South Africa
2018	Oluwatobiloba Amusan	Nigeria
2022	Oluwatobiloba Amusan	Nigeria
2024	Ebony Morrison	Liberia

=== 400 m hurdles ===
Year	Athlete	Country
1979	Fatima El-Faquir	Morocco
1982	Nawal El Moutawakil	Morocco
1984	Nawal El Moutawakil	Morocco
1985	Nawal El Moutawakil	Morocco
1988	Maria Usifo	Nigeria
1989	Maria Usifo	Nigeria
1990	Nezha Bidouane	Morocco
1992	Myrtle Bothma	South Africa
1993	Omotayo Akinremi	Nigeria
1996	Saidat Onanuga	Nigeria
1998	Nezha Bidouane	Morocco
2000	Mame Tacko Diouf	Senegal
2002	Zahra Lachgar	Morocco
2004	Surita Febbraio	South Africa
2006	Janet Wienand	South Africa
2008	Joke Odumosu	Nigeria
2010	Hayat Lambarki	Morocco
2012	Muizat Ajoke Odumosu	Nigeria
2014	Wenda Nel	South Africa
2016	Wenda Nel	South Africa
2018	Glory Onome Nathaniel	Nigeria
2022	Zenéy van der Walt	South Africa
2024	Rogail Joseph	South Africa

=== 3000 m steeplechase ===
Year	Athlete	Country
2004	Bouchra Chaabi	Morocco
2006	Jeruto Kiptum	Kenya
2008	Zemzem Ahmed	Ethiopia
2010	Milcah Chemos Cheywa	Kenya
2012	Mercy Wanjiku	Kenya
2014	Hiwot Ayalew	Ethiopia
2016	Norah Jeruto	Kenya
2018	Beatrice Chepkoech	Kenya
2022	Werkwuha Getachew	Ethiopia
2024	Loice Chekwemoi	Uganda

=== High jump ===
Year	Athlete	Country
1979	Kawther Akrémi	Tunisia
1982	Fernande Agnentchoué	Gabon
1984	Awa Dioum-Ndiaye	Senegal
1985	Awa Dioum-Ndiaye	Senegal
1988	Lucienne N'Da	Ivory Coast
1989	Lucienne N'Da	Ivory Coast
1990	Lucienne N'Da	Ivory Coast
1992	Lucienne N'Da	Ivory Coast
1993	Charmaine Weavers	South Africa
1996	Irène Tiendrébéogo	Burkina Faso
1998	Hestrie Storbeck	South Africa
2000	Hind Bounouar	Morocco
2002	Hestrie Cloete-Storbeck	South Africa
2004	Hestrie Cloete	South Africa
2006	Reine van der Merwe	South Africa
2008	Anika Smit	South Africa
2010	Selloane Tsoaeli	Lesotho
2012	Lissa Labiche	Seychelles
2014	Rhizlane Siba	Morocco
2016	Lissa Labiche	Seychelles
2018	Erika Seyama	Eswatini
2022	Rose Yeboah	Ghana
2024	Rose Yeboah	Ghana

=== Pole vault ===
Year	Athlete	Country
2000	Syrine Balti	Tunisia
2002	Syrine Balti	Tunisia
2004	Syrine Balti	Tunisia
2006	Syrine Balti	Tunisia
2008	Leila Ben Youssef	Tunisia
2010	Nisrine Dinar	Morocco
2012	Syrine Balti	Tunisia
2014	Syrine Balti	Tunisia
2016	Syrine Balti	Tunisia
2018	Dorra Mahfoudhi	Tunisia
2022	Miré Reinstorf	South Africa
2024	Miré Reinstorf	South Africa

=== Long jump ===
Year	Athlete	Country
1979	Bella Bell-Gam	Nigeria
1982	Jacinta Serete	Kenya
1984	Marianne Mendoza	Senegal
1985	Marianne Mendoza	Senegal
1988	Juliana Yendork	Ghana
1989	Chioma Ajunwa	Nigeria
1990	Chioma Ajunwa	Nigeria
1992	Karen Botha	South Africa
1993	Christy Opara-Thompson	Nigeria
1996	Grace Umelo	Nigeria
1998	Chioma Ajunwa	Nigeria
2000	Kéné Ndoye	Senegal
2002	Françoise Mbango Etone	Cameroon
2004	Kéné Ndoye	Senegal
2006	Josephine Bike Mbarga	Cameroon
2008	Janice Josephs	South Africa
2010	Blessing Okagbare	Nigeria
2012 :	Blessing Okagbare	Nigeria
2014	Ese Brume	Nigeria
2016	Ese Brume	Nigeria
2018	Ese Brume	Nigeria
2022	Marthe Koala	Burkina Faso
2024	Ese Brume	Nigeria

=== Triple jump ===
Year	Athlete	Country
1992	Awa Dioum-Ndiaye	Senegal
1993	Petrusa Swart	South Africa
1996	Kéné Ndoye	Senegal
1998	Baya Rahouli	Algeria
2000	Baya Rahouli	Algeria
2002	Françoise Mbango Etone	Cameroon
2004	Yamilé Aldama	Sudan
2006	Yamilé Aldama	Sudan
2008	Françoise Mbango	Cameroon
2010	Sarah Nambawa	Uganda
2012	Sarah Nambawa	Uganda
2014	Joelle Mbumi Nkouindjin	Cameroon
2016	Nadia Eke	Ghana
2018	Grace Anigbata	Nigeria
2022	Sangoné Kandji	Senegal
2024	Saly Sarr	Senegal

=== Shot put ===
Year	Athlete	Country
1979	Odette Mistoul	Gabon
1982	Odette Mistoul	Gabon
1984	Odette Mistoul	Gabon
1985	Souad Malloussi	Morocco
1988	Hanan Ahmed Khaled	Egypt
1989	Hanan Ahmed Khaled	Egypt
1990	Hanan Ahmed Khaled	Egypt
1992	Fouzia Fatihi	Morocco
1993	Louise Meintjies	South Africa
1996	Hanan Ahmed Khaled	Egypt
1998	Veronica Abrahamse	South Africa
2000	Hanaa Salah El Melegi	Egypt
2002	Vivian Chukwuemeka	Nigeria
2004	Wafa Ismail El Baghdadi	Egypt
2006	Vivian Chukwuemeka	Nigeria
2008	Vivian Chukwuemeka	Nigeria
2010	Mirian Ibekwe	Nigeria
2012	Vivian Chukwuemeka	Nigeria
2014	Auriol Dongmo Mekemnang	Cameroon
2016	Auriol Dongmo	Cameroon
2018	Ischke Senekal	South Africa
2022	Ischke Senekal	South Africa
2024	Ashley Erasmus	South Africa

=== Discus throw ===
Year	Athlete	Country
1979	Zoubida Laayouni	Morocco
1982	Zoubida Laayouni	Morocco
1984	Zoubida Laayouni	Morocco
1985	Zoubida Laayouni	Morocco
1988	Grace Apiafi	Nigeria
1989	Zoubida Laayouni	Morocco
1990	Zoubida Laayouni	Morocco
1992	Lizette Etsebeth	South Africa
1993	Lizette Etsebeth	South Africa
1996	Monia Kari	Tunisia
1998	Elizna Naudé	South Africa
2000	Monia Kari	Tunisia
2002	Monia Kari	Tunisia
2004	Elizna Naudé	South Africa
2006	Elizna Naudé	South Africa
2008	Elizna Naudé	South Africa
2010	Elizna Naudé	South Africa
2012	Chinwe Okoro	Nigeria
2014	Chinwe Okoro	Nigeria
2016	Nwanneka Okwelogu	Nigeria
2018	Chioma Onyekwere	Nigeria
2022	Chioma Onyekwere	Nigeria
2024	Ashley Anumba	Nigeria

=== Hammer throw ===
Year	Athlete	Country
1998	Caroline Fournier	Mauritius
2000	Caroline Fournier	Mauritius
2002	Marwa Ahmed Hussein	Egypt
2004	Marwa Ahmed Hussein	Egypt
2006	Marwa Ahmed Hussein	Egypt
2008	Marwa Ahmed Hussein	Egypt
2010	Amy Sène	Senegal
2012	Amy Sène	Senegal
2014	Lætitia Bambara	Burkina Faso
2016	Amy Sène	Senegal
2018	Soukaina Zakour	Morocco
2022	Oyesade Olatoye	Nigeria
2024	Zahra Tatar	Algeria

=== Javelin throw ===
Year	Athlete	Country
1979	Agnès Tchuinté	Cameroon
1982	Agnès Tchuinté	Cameroon
1984	Ténin Camara	Ivory Coast
1985	Agnès Tchuinté	Cameroon
1988	Yasmina Azzizi	Algeria
1989	Chinweoke Chikwelu	Nigeria
1990	Seraphina Nyauma	Kenya
1992	Seraphina Nyauma	Kenya
1993	Liezl Roux	South Africa
1996 :	Fatma Zouhour Toumi	Tunisia
1998	Lindy Leveaux	Seychelles
2000	Aïda Sellam	Tunisia
2002	Aïda Sellam	Tunisia
2004	Sunette Viljoen	South Africa
2006	Justine Robbeson	South Africa
2008	Sunette Viljoen	South Africa
2010	Sunette Viljoen	South Africa
2012	Margaret Simpson	Ghana
2014	Sunette Viljoen	South Africa
2016	Sunette Viljoen	South Africa
2018	Kelechi Nwanaga	Nigeria
2022	Jo-Ane van Dyk	South Africa
2024	Jo-Ane van Dyk	South Africa

=== Pentathlon ===
Year	Athlete	Country
1979	Bella Bell-Gam	Nigeria

=== Heptathlon ===
Year	Athlete	Country
1982	Chérifa Meskaoui	Morocco
1984	Chérifa Meskaoui	Morocco
1985	Chérifa Meskaoui	Morocco
1988	Yasmina Azzizi	Algeria
1989	Yasmina Azzizi	Algeria
1990	Albertine Koutouan	Ivory Coast
1992	Chrisna Oosthuizen	South Africa
1993	Chrisna Oosthuizen	South Africa
1996	Caroline Kola	Kenya
1998	Patience Itanyi	Nigeria
2000	Yasmina Azzizi-Kettab	Algeria
2002	Margaret Simpson	Ghana
2004	Margaret Simpson	Ghana
2006	Janice Josephs	South Africa
2008	Patience Okoro	Nigeria
2010	Margaret Simpson	Ghana
2012	Yasmina Omrani	Algeria
2014	Marthe Koala	Burkina Faso
2016	Uhunoma Osazuwa	Nigeria
2018	Odile Ahouanwanou	Benin
2022	Odile Ahouanwanou	Benin
2024	Odile Ahouanwanou	Benin

=== 4 × 100 m relay ===
Year	Country
1979	Ghana
1982	Kenya
1984	Kenya
1985	Ghana
1988	Ghana
1989	Nigeria
1990	Nigeria
1992	South Africa
1993	Nigeria
1996	Cameroon
1998	Nigeria
2000	Ghana
2002	Nigeria
2004	Nigeria
2006	Ghana
2008	Nigeria
2010	Nigeria
2012	Nigeria
2014	Nigeria
2016	South Africa
2018	Nigeria
2022	Nigeria
2024	Nigeria

=== 4 × 400 m relay ===
Year	Country
1979	Ghana
1982	Kenya
1984	Kenya
1985	Nigeria
1988	Uganda
1989	Nigeria
1990	Nigeria
1992	Nigeria
1993	Nigeria
1996	Nigeria
1998	Nigeria
2000	Cameroon
2002	Cameroon
2004	Senegal
2006	South Africa
2008	Nigeria
2010	Nigeria
2012	Nigeria
2014	Nigeria
2016	South Africa
2018	Nigeria
2022	South Africa
2024	Nigeria

== See also ==
- African Championships in Athletics
