= 1979 IAAF World Cup – Results =

These are the full results of the 1979 IAAF World Cup which was held between 24 and 26 August 1979 at the Olympic Stadium in Montreal, Canada.

== Results ==
=== 100 m ===
==== Men ====
24 August
Wind: -0.4 m/s

Rank	Athlete	Team	Time	Points	Notes
1	James Sanford	United States	10.17	8	
2	Silvio Leonard (CUB)	Americas	10.26	7	
3	Marian Woronin (POL)	Europe	10.28	6	
4	Olaf Prenzler	East Germany	10.33	5	
5	Ernest Obeng (GHA)	Africa	10.36	4	
6	Richard James (AUS)	Oceania	10.49	3	
7	Suchart Chairsuvaparb (THA)	Asia	10.51	2	
8	Nikolay Kolesnikov	Soviet Union	11.47	1	

==== Women ====
25 August
Wind: -0.9 m/s

Rank	Athlete	Team	Time	Points	Notes
1	Evelyn Ashford	United States	11.06	8	
2	Marlies Göhr	East Germany	11.17	7	
3	Annegret Richter (FRG)	Europe	10.28	6	
4	Lyudmila Kondratyeva	Soviet Union	11.47	5	
5	Angella Taylor (CAN)	Americas	11.50	4	
6	Helen Edwards (AUS)	Oceania	11.67	3	
7	Oguzoeme Nsenu (NGR)	Africa	11.78	2	
8	Emiko Konishi (JPN)	Asia	12.31	1	

=== 200 m ===
==== Men ====
25 August
Wind: 0.0 m/s

Rank	Athlete	Team	Time	Points	Notes
1	Silvio Leonard (CUB)	Americas	20.34	8	
2	Leszek Dunecki (POL)	Europe	20.50	7	
3	Peter Okodogbe (NGR)	Africa	20.69	6	
4	Bernhard Hoff	East Germany	20.73	5	
5	Mel Lattany	United States	20.75	4	
6	Viktor Burakov	Soviet Union	20.96	3	
7	Yasuhiro Harada (JPN)	Asia	21.14	2	
8	Barry Besanko (AUS)	Oceania	21.19	1	

==== Women ====
24 August
Wind: -0.2 m/s

Rank	Athlete	Team	Time	Points	Notes
1	Evelyn Ashford	United States	21.83	8	
2	Marita Koch	East Germany	22.02	7	
3	Lyudmila Kondratyeva	Soviet Union	22.66	6	
4	Annegret Richter (FRG)	Europe	22.78	5	
5	Angella Taylor (CAN)	Americas	22.83	4	
6	Hannah Afriyie (GHA)	Africa	23.61	3	
7	Kim Robertson (NZL)	Oceania	23.78	2	
8	Sumiko Kaihara (JPN)	Asia	24.60	1	

=== 400 m ===
==== Men ====
25 August

Rank	Athlete	Team	Time	Points	Notes
1	Hassan El Kashief (SUD)	Africa	45.39	8	
2	Nikolay Chernetskiy	Soviet Union	46.06	7	
3	Tony Darden	United States	46.12	6	
4	Franz-Peter Hofmeister (FRG)	Europe	46.36	5	
5	Frank Schaffer	East Germany	46.40	4	
6	Colin Bradford (JAM)	Americas	46.88	3	
7	Jim O'Sullivan (AUS)	Oceania	48.20	2	
8	Shoichi Handa (JPN)	Asia	48.58	1	

==== Women ====
26 August

Rank	Athlete	Team	Time	Points	Notes
1	Marita Koch	East Germany	48.97	8	
2	Maria Kulchunova	Soviet Union	50.60	7	
3	Irena Szewińska (POL)	Europe	51.15	6	
4	Marita Payne (CAN)	Americas	53.01	5	
5	Terri-Anne Wangman (AUS)	Oceania	53.44	4	
6	Ruth Waithera (KEN)	Africa	53.60	3	
7	Patricia Jackson	United States	54.37	2	
8	Rita Sen (IND)	Asia	57.76	1	

=== 800 m ===
==== Men ====
24 August

Rank	Athlete	Team	Time	Points	Notes
1	James Maina Boi (KEN)	Africa	1:47.69	8	
2	James Robinson	United States	1:47.85	7	
3	Willi Wülbeck (FRG)	Europe	1:47.88	6	
4	Olaf Beyer	East Germany	1:47.90	5	
5	Agberto Guimarães (BRA)	Americas	1:48.8	4	
6	Anatoliy Reshetnyak	Soviet Union	1:49.4	3	
7	John Higham (AUS)	Oceania	1:50.2	2	
8	Faleh Naji (IRQ)	Asia	1:55.4	1	

==== Women ====
25 August

Rank	Athlete	Team	Time	Points	Notes
1	Nikolina Shtereva (BUL)	Europe	2:00.52	8	
2	Nadezhda Mushta	Soviet Union	2:01.09	7	
3	Anita Weiß	East Germany	2:01.33	6	
4	Anne Mackie-Morelli (CAN)	Americas	2:02.01	5	
5	Charlene Rendina (AUS)	Oceania	2:02.62	4	
6	Mary Chemweno (KEN)	Africa	2:04.49	3	
7	Wendy Knudson	United States	2:06.06	2	
8	Geeta Zutshi (IND)	Asia	2:10.31	1	

=== 1500 m ===
==== Men ====
25 August

Rank	Athlete	Team	Time	Points	Notes
1	Thomas Wessinghage (FRG)	Europe	3:46.00	8	
2	Vladimir Ponomaryov	Soviet Union	3:46.13	7	
3	Jürgen Straub	East Germany	3:46.30	6	
4	Steve Scott	United States	3:46.78	5	
5	Mike Boit (KEN)	Africa	3:46.85	4	
6	Steve Foley (AUS)	Oceania	3:47.8	3	
7	Paul Craig (CAN)	Americas	3:48.1	2	
8	Rattan Singh (IND)	Asia	3:52.4	1	

==== Women ====
26 August

Rank	Athlete	Team	Time	Points	Notes
~~1~~	Totka Petrova (BUL)	Europe	~~4:06.47~~	~~8~~	DQ
1	Christina Wartenberg	East Germany	4:06.88	8	
2	Giana Romanova	Soviet Union	4:08.73	7	
3	Francie Larrieu	United States	4:09.16	6	
4	Sakina Boutamine (ALG)	Africa	4:12.13	5	
5	Alison Wright (NZL)	Oceania	4:13.48	4	
6	Brit McRoberts (CAN)	Americas	4:15.33	3	
7	Kumiko Kobayashi (JPN)	Asia	4:47.61	2	

=== 5000/3000 m ===
==== Men ====
26 August

Rank	Athlete	Team	Time	Points	Notes
1	Miruts Yifter (ETH)	Africa	13:35.9	8	
2	Valeriy Abramov	Soviet Union	13:37.6	7	
3	Markus Ryffel (SUI)	Europe	13:38.6	6	
4	Hansjörg Kunze	East Germany	13:39.8	5	
5	Rodolfo Gómez (MEX)	Americas	13:40.6	4	
6	Matt Centrowitz	United States	13:42.0	3	
7	David Fitsimmons (AUS)	Oceania	13:45.1	2	
8	Gopal Singh Saini (IND)	Asia	14:26.8	1	

==== Women ====
25 August

Rank	Athlete	Team	Time	Points	Notes
1	Svetlana Ulmasova	Soviet Union	8:36.34	8	
2	Grete Waitz (NOR)	Europe	8:38.59	7	
3	Francie Larrieu	United States	8:53.02	6	
4	Ursula Sauer	East Germany	9:13.27	5	
5	Barbara Moore (NZL)	Oceania	9:19.65	4	
6	Shauna Miller (CAN)	Americas	9:20.28	3	
7	Sakina Boutamine (ALG)	Africa	9:30.73	2	
8	Tashiko Kumagai (JPN)	Asia	9:52.95	1	

=== 10,000 m ===
==== Men ====
24 August

Rank	Athlete	Team	Time	Points	Notes
1	Miruts Yifter (ETH)	Africa	27:53.07	8	
2	Craig Virgin	United States	27:59.55	7	
3	Aleksandr Antipov	Soviet Union	28:25.17	6	
4	Gerard Barratt (AUS)	Oceania	28:29.76	5	
5	Peter Butler (CAN)	Americas	28:40.83	4	
6	Werner Schildhauer	East Germany	29:15.52	3	
7	John Treacy (IRL)	Europe	29:25.30	2	
8	Edward Vincent (IND)	Asia	29:26.50	1	

=== 110/100 m hurdles ===
==== Men ====
26 August
Wind: 0.0 m/s

Rank	Athlete	Team	Time	Points	Notes
1	Renaldo Nehemiah	United States	13.39	8	
2	Thomas Munkelt	East Germany	13.42	7	
3	Alejandro Casañas (CUB)	Americas	13.44	6	
4	Aleksandr Puchkov	Soviet Union	13.74	5	
5	Jan Pusty (POL)	Europe	13.88	4	
6	Godwin Obasogie (NGR)	Africa	14.18	3	
7	Michael Wilson (AUS)	Oceania	14.59	2	
	Yoshifumi Fujimori (JPN)	Asia	DNF	0	

==== Women ====
25 August
Wind: -0.1 m/s

Rank	Athlete	Team	Time	Points	Notes
1	Grażyna Rabsztyn (POL)	Europe	12.67	8	
2	Tatyana Anisimova	Soviet Union	12.75	7	
3	Kerstin Claus	East Germany	13.03	6	
4	Debbie LaPlante	United States	13.23	5	
5	Sharon Lane (CAN)	Americas	13.63	4	
6	Penny Gillies (AUS)	Oceania	13.88	3	
7	Judy Bell-Gam (NGR)	Africa	13.93	2	
8	Emi Akimoto (JPN)	Asia	14.28	1	

=== 400 m hurdles ===
==== Men ====
24 August

Rank	Athlete	Team	Time	Points	Notes
1	Edwin Moses	United States	47.53	8	
2	Harald Schmid (FRG)	Europe	48.71	7	
3	Vasiliy Arkhipenko	Soviet Union	48.97	6	
4	Volker Beck	East Germany	49.66	5	
5	Peter Grant (AUS)	Oceania	50.20	4	
6	António Ferreira (BRA)	Americas	50.54	3	
7	Daniel Kimaiyo (KEN)	Africa	50.55	2	
	Hassan Kadhum (IRQ)	Asia	DNS	1	

==== Women ====
24 August

Rank	Athlete	Team	Time	Points	Notes
1	Bärbel Klepp	East Germany	55.83	8	
2	Marina Makeyeva	Soviet Union	56.02	7	
3	Debbie Esser	United States	56.75	6	
4	Christine Warden (GBR)	Europe	57.20	5	
5	Lynette Young (AUS)	Oceania	58.80	4	
6	Francine Gendron (CAN)	Americas	60.91	3	
7	Yumiko Aoi (JPN)	Asia	61.02	2	
8	Fatima El Faquir (MAR)	Africa	67.42	1	

=== 3000 m steeplechase ===
==== Men ====
25 August

Rank	Athlete	Team	Time	Points	Notes
1	Kip Rono (KEN)	Africa	8:25.97	8	
2	Ralf Pönitzsch	East Germany	8:29.28	7	
3	Mariano Scartezzini (ITA)	Europe	8:29.44	6	
4	Henry Marsh	United States	8:30.09	5	
5	Masanari Shintaku (JPN)	Asia	8:40.00	4	
6	Anatoliy Dimov	Soviet Union	8:46.23	3	
7	Philippe Lahuerte (CAN)	Americas	8:54.68	2	
8	Howard Healey (AUS)	Oceania	9:15.06	1	

=== 4 × 100 m relay ===
==== Men ====
25 August

Rank	Team	Athletes	Time	Points	Notes
1	Americas	Osvaldo Lara (CUB), Nelson dos Santos (BRA), Silvio Leonard (CUB), Altevir de Araújo (BRA)	38.70	8	
2	United States	Mike Roberson, Harvey Glance, Mel Lattany, Steve Riddick	38.77	7	
3	Europe	Jerzy Brunner (POL), Leszek Dunecki (POL), Zenon Licznerski (POL), Marian Woronin (POL)	38.85	6	
4	East Germany	Klaus-Dieter Kurrat, Detlef Kübeck, Olaf Prenzler, Alexander Thieme	38.86	5	
5	Africa	Ernest Obeng (GHA), Edward Ofili (NGR), Théophile Nkounkou (CGO), Peter Okodogbe (NGR)	39.02	4	
6	Soviet Union	Valeriy Pidluzhnyy, Andrey Shlyapnikov, Aleksandr Aksinin, Vladimir Ignatenko	39.52	3	
7	Oceania	James Kelly (AUS), Richard James (AUS), Barry Besanko (AUS), Colin O'Sullivan (AUS)	39.85	2	
8	Asia	Suchart Chairsuvaparb (THA), Mohammed Al-Malki (OMA), Akira Harada (JPN), Shunzo Shito (JPN)	40.09	1	

==== Women ====
26 August

Rank	Team	Athletes	Time	Points	Notes
1	Europe	Linda Haglund (SWE), Chantal Réga (FRA), Annegret Richter (FRG), Heather Hunte (GBR)	42.19	8	
2	East Germany	Christina Brehmer, Romy Schneider, Ingrid Auerswald, Marlies Göhr	42.32	7	
3	Soviet Union	Vera Anisimova, Olga Korotkova, Marina Sidorova, Lyudmila Kondratyeva	42.32	6	
4	United States	Evelyn Ashford, Karen Hawkins, Dollie Fleetwood, Valerie Boyer	43.53	5	
5	Americas	Lilieth Hodges (JAM), Rosie Allwood (JAM), Silvia Chivás (CUB), Angella Taylor (CAN)	43.99	4	
6	Oceania	Helen Edwards (AUS), Debbie Wells (AUS), Janeen Faithfull (AUS), Kim Robertson (NZL)	44.62	3	
7	Africa	Nzaeli Kyomo (TAN), Grace Bakari (GHA), Hannah Afriyie (GHA), Oguzoeme Nsenu (NGR)	44.83	2	
8	Asia	Yumiko Aoi (JPN), Usanee Lopinkarn (THA), Mo Hyung-hee (KOR), Ying Yaping (CHN)	46.19	1	

=== 4 × 400 m relay ===
==== Men ====
26 August

Rank	Team	Athletes	Time	Points	Notes
1	United States	Herman Frazier, Bill Green, Willie Smith, Tony Darden	3:00.70	8	
2	Europe	Ryszard Podlas (POL), Franz-Peter Hofmeister (FRG), Harry Schulting (NED), Harald Schmid (FRG)	3:00.80	7	
3	Africa	Billy Konchellah (KEN), Dele Udo (NGR), James Atuti (KEN), Hassan El Kachief (SUD)	3:01.22	6	
4	Soviet Union	Viktor Burakov, Vasiliy Arkhipyenko, Remigijus Valiulis, Nikolay Chernetskiy	3:02.24	5	
5	Americas	Ian Stapleton (JAM), Colin Bradford (JAM), Brian Saunders (JAM), Clyde Edwards (BAR)	3:02.39	4	
6	East Germany	Frank Richter, Udo Bauer, Frank Schaffer, Manfred Konow	3:05.27	3	
7	Oceania	Peter Grant (AUS), Jim O'Sullivan (AUS), John Higham (AUS), Peter Pearless (NZL)	3:06.19	2	
8	Asia	Fahim Al-Sada (IRQ), Uday Krishna Pradhu (IND), Ramashwany Gnanasekaran (IND), Shoichi Handa (JPN)	3:12.49	1	

==== Women ====
24 August

Rank	Team	Athletes	Time	Points	Notes
1	East Germany	Gabriele Kotte, Christina Brehmer, Brigitte Köhn, Marita Koch	3:20.37	8	
2	Soviet Union	Irina Bagryantseva, Tatyana Prorochenko, Nina Zyuskova, Mariya Kulchunova	3:23.04	7	
3	United States	Sharon Dabney, Rosalyn Bryant, Patricia Jackson, Sherri Howard	3:27.36	6	
4	Europe	Karoline Käfer (AUT), Jarmila Kratochvílová (TCH), Elke Decker (FRG), Irena Szewińska (POL)	3:27.39	5	
5	Americas	Aurelia Pentón (CUB), Jackie Pusey (JAM), Marita Payne (CAN), June Griffith (GUY)	3:28.50	4	
6	Oceania	Marian O'Shaughnessy (AUS), Terri-Anne Wangman (AUS), Lynnette Young (AUS), Kim Robertson (NZL)	3:35.60	3	
7	Africa	Grace Bakari (GHA), Marième Boye (SEN), Mary Chemweno (KEN), Ruth Waithera (KEN)	3:36.24	2	
8	Asia	Rita Sen (IND), Yumiko Aoi (JPN), Saik Oik Cum (MAS), Chen Juying (CHN)	3:48.75	1	

=== High jump ===
==== Men ====
25 August

Rank	Athlete	Team	Result	Points	Notes
1	Franklin Jacobs	United States	2.27	8	
2	Jacek Wszoła (POL)	Europe	2.27	7	
3	Aleksandr Grigoryev	Soviet Union	2.24	6	
4	Rolf Beilschmidt	East Germany	2.24	5	
5	Milton Ottey (CAN)	Americas	2.10	4	
6	Othmane Belfaa (ALG)	Africa	2.10	3	
7	Kazunori Koshikawa (JPN)	Asia	2.05	2	
8	Michael Dick (AUS)	Oceania	2.00	1	

==== Women ====
26 August

Rank	Athlete	Team	Result	Points	Notes
1	Debbie Brill (CAN)	Americas	1.96	8	
2	Sara Simeoni (ITA)	Europe	1.94	7	
3	Nina Serbina	Soviet Union	1.90	6	
4	Rosemarie Ackermann	East Germany	1.87	5	
5	Louise Ritter	United States	1.87	4	
6	Catherine Soanes (AUS)	Oceania	1.78	3	
7	Zheng Dazhen (CHN)	Asia	1.75	2	
8	Kawther Akrémi (TUN)	Africa	1.65	1	

=== Pole vault ===
==== Men ====
25 August

Rank	Athlete	Team	Result	Points	Notes
1	Mike Tully	United States	5.45	8	
2	Patrick Abada (FRA)	Europe	5.45	7	
3	Konstantin Volkov	Soviet Union	5.30	6	
4	Bruce Simpson (CAN)	Americas	5.20	5	
5	Itsuo Takanezawa (JPN)	Asia	5.00	4	
6	Axel Weber	East Germany	5.00	3	
7	Bob Huddle (AUS)	Oceania	4.60	2	
	Kaddour Rahal (ALG)	Africa	NM	0	

=== Long jump ===
==== Men ====
26 August

Rank	Athlete	Team	Result	Points	Notes
1	Larry Myricks	United States	8.52	8	
2	Lutz Dombrowski	East Germany	8.27	7	
3	David Giralt (CUB)	Americas	8.22	6	
4	Valeriy Pidluzhnyy	Soviet Union	7.88	5	
5	Gary Honey (AUS)	Oceania	7.72	4	
6	Grzegorz Cybulski (POL)	Europe	7.66	3	
7	Suresh Babu (IND)	Asia	7.41	2	
8	Kayode Elegbede (NGR)	Africa	7.36	1	

==== Women ====
24 August

Rank	Athlete	Team	Result	Points	Notes
1	Anita Stukāne	Soviet Union	6.64	8	
2	Brigitte Wujak	East Germany	6.55	7	
3	Kathy McMillan	United States	6.31	6	
4	Eloína Hechavarría (CUB)	Americas	6.25	5	
5	Doina Anton (ROM)	Europe	6.09	4	
6	Sumie Awara (JPN)	Asia	5.96	3	
7	Lynette Jacenko (AUS)	Oceania	5.91	2	
8	Bella Bellgam (NGR)	Africa	5.73	1	

=== Triple jump ===
==== Men ====
25 August

Rank	Athlete	Team	Result	Points	Notes
1	João Carlos de Oliveira (BRA)	Americas	17.02	8	
2	Gennadiy Valyukevich	Soviet Union	16.94	7	
3	Ian Campbell (AUS)	Oceania	16.76	6	
4	Zou Zhenxian (CHN)	Asia	16.68	5	
5	Willie Banks	United States	16.66	4	
6	Lolnar Gora	East Germany	16.31	3	
7	Ajayi Agbebaku (NGR)	Africa	16.31	2	
8	Bernard Lamitié (FRA)	Europe	15.86	1	

=== Shot put ===
==== Men ====
26 August

Rank	Athlete	Team	Result	Points	Notes
1	Udo Beyer	East Germany	20.45	8	
2	Reijo Ståhlberg (FIN)	Europe	20.05	7	
3	Aleksandr Baryshnikov	Soviet Union	20.00	6	
4	Dave Laut	United States	19.42	5	
5	Bishop Dolegiewicz (CAN)	Americas	19.40	4	
6	Nagui Asaad (EGY)	Africa	19.00	3	
7	Mohamed Al-Zinkawi (KUW)	Asia	17.25	2	
8	Ray Rigby (AUS)	Oceania	16.43	1	

==== Women ====
24 August

Rank	Athlete	Team	Result	Points	Notes
1	Ilona Slupianek	East Germany	20.98	8	
2	Helena Fibingerová (TCH)	Europe	19.74	7	
3	Svetlana Krachevskaya	Soviet Union	19.70	6	
4	Maren Seidler	United States	18.86	5	
5	María Elena Sarría (CUB)	Americas	18.59	4	
6	Shen Lijuan (CHN)	Asia	17.25	3	
7	Bev Francis (AUS)	Oceania	15.16	2	
8	Odette Mistoul (GAB)	Africa	13.71	1	

=== Discus throw ===
==== Men ====
24 August

Rank	Athlete	Team	Result	Points	Notes
1	Wolfgang Schmidt	East Germany	66.02	8	
2	Mac Wilkins	United States	64.92	7	
3	Luis Delís (CUB)	Americas	63.50	6	
4	Knut Hjeltnes (NOR)	Europe	63.50	5	
5	Ihor Duhinets	Soviet Union	59.34	4	
6	Robin Tait (NZL)	Oceania	54.60	3	
7	Abderrazak Ben Hassine (TUN)	Africa	52.82	2	
8	Kiyotaka Kawasaki (JPN)	Asia	52.54	1	

==== Women ====
26 August

Rank	Athlete	Team	Result	Points	Notes
1	Evelin Jahl	East Germany	65.18	8	
2	Svetlana Melnikova	Soviet Union	65.14	7	
3	María Cristina Betancourt (CUB)	Americas	62.84	6	
4	Svetla Bozhkova (BUL)	Europe	60.84	5	
5	Gael Mulhall (AUS)	Oceania	56.50	4	
6	Li Xiaohui (CHN)	Asia	55.64	3	
7	Lynne Winbigler	United States	50.06	2	
8	Zoubida Laayouni (MAR)	Africa	46.08	1	

=== Hammer throw ===
==== Men ====
25 August

Rank	Athlete	Team	Result	Points	Notes
1	Sergey Litvinov	Soviet Union	78.70	8	
2	Karl-Hans Riehm (FRG)	Europe	75.88	7	
3	Roland Steuk	East Germany	74.82	6	
4	Peter Farmer (AUS)	Oceania	71.68	5	
5	Armando Orozco (CUB)	Americas	69.62	4	
6	Shigenobu Murofushi (JPN)	Asia	67.32	3	
7	Boris Djerassi	United States	65.20	2	
8	Abdallah Boubekeur (ALG)	Africa	51.66	1	

=== Javelin throw ===
==== Men ====
25 August

Rank	Athlete	Team	Result	Points	Notes
1	Wolfgang Hanisch	East Germany	86.48	8	
2	Mike O'Rourke (NZL)	Oceania	85.80	7	
3	Antonio González (CUB)	Americas	83.44	6	
4	Michael Wessing (FRG)	Europe	81.06	5	
5	Aleksandr Makarov	Soviet Union	80.76	4	
6	Jacques Ayé Abehi (CIV)	Africa	74.94	3	
7	Shen Maomao (CHN)	Asia	72.70	2	
8	Duncan Atwood	United States	71.06	1	

==== Women ====
24 August

Rank	Athlete	Team	Result	Points	Notes
1	Ruth Fuchs	East Germany	66.10	8	
2	Éva Ráduly-Zörgő (ROM)	Europe	65.82	7	
3	María Caridad Colón (CUB)	Americas	63.50	6	
4	Kate Schmidt	United States	59.98	5	
5	Saida Gunba	Soviet Union	57.00	4	
6	Li Xiaohui (CHN)	Asia	52.50	3	
7	Pamela Matthews (AUS)	Oceania	52.48	2	
8	Agnès Tchuinté (CMR)	Africa	49.64	1	
