= Athletics at the West African Games =

I West African Games
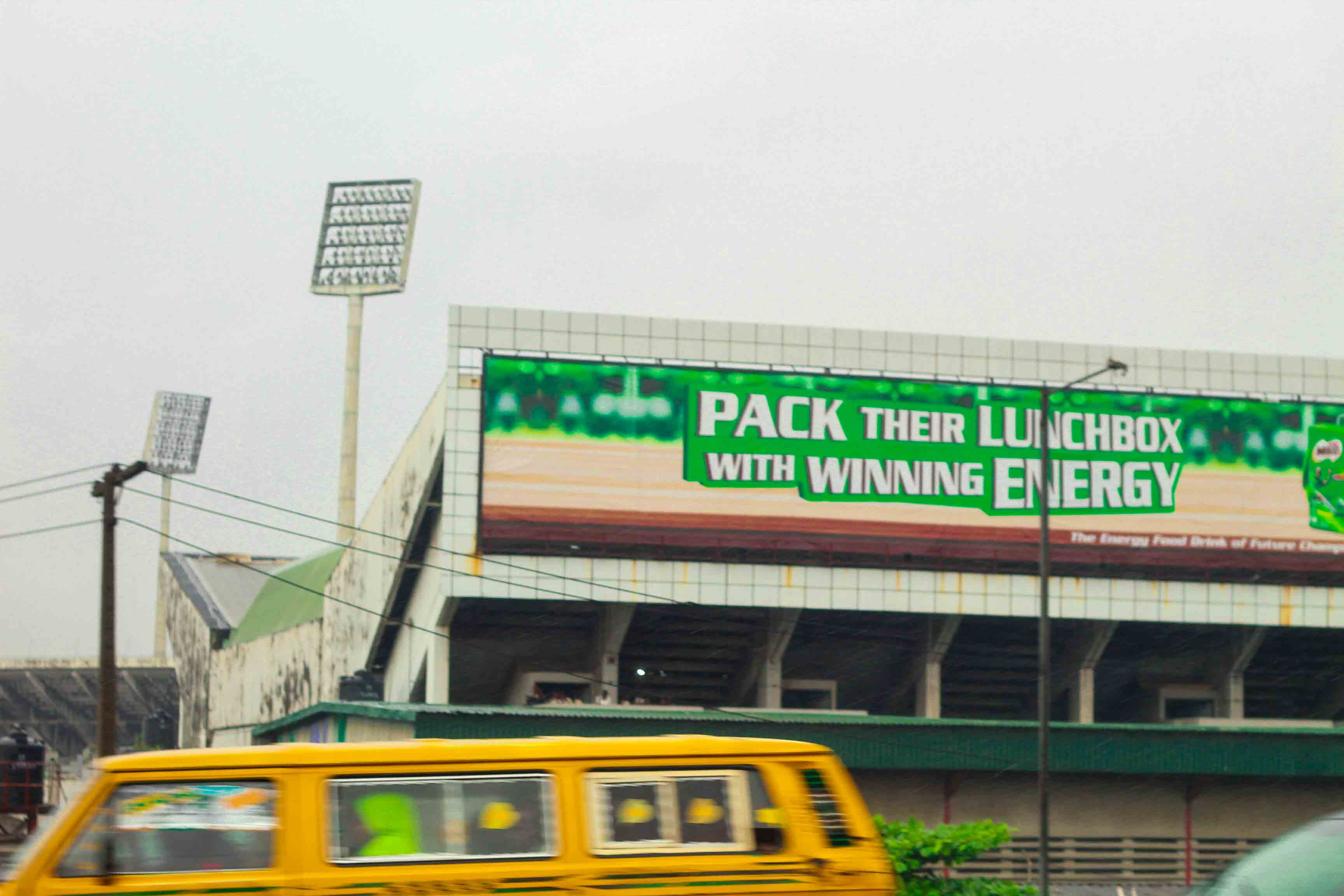
- Dates: 27 August – 3 September 1977
- Host city: Lagos, Nigeria
- Venue: National Stadium, Lagos
- Events: 34
- Participation: 10 nations

The athletics competition at the West African Games was held from 27 August – 3 September 1977 at the National Stadium, Lagos in Lagos, Nigeria. A total 34 events were contested, 21 for men and 13 for women

== Medal summary ==
=== Men ===
Event	Gold		Silver		Bronze	
100 metres	Amadou Meïté (CIV)	10.59	Ohene Karikari (GHA)	10.59	Albert Lomotey (GHA)	10.65
200 metres	Georges Kablan Degnan (CIV)	21.18	Amadou Meïté (CIV)	21.25	Samson Oyeledun (NGR)	21.40
400 metres	Felix Imadiyi (NGR)	45.60	Joseph Bandu (NGR)	46.89	Ahmed Garba (NGR)	47.35
800 metres	Lorenz Azuh (NGR)	1:49.2a	William Amakye (GHA)	1:50.3a	Hope Ezeigbo (NGR)	1:50.8a
1500 metres	Lorenz Azuh (NGR)	3:51.88	Halidu Zinata (GHA)	3:54.0a	A. Fall (SEN)	3:54.4a
5000 metres	George Umoru (NGR)	14:55.0a	Tony Ekundayo (NGR)	14:58.5a	Cheikh Dieng (SEN)	15:11.6a
10,000 metres	George Osei (GHA)	31:07.2a	I. Ishola (NGR)	31:28.7a	Antoine Mbengue (SEN)	31:39.3a
Marathon	Dankara Mang (NGR)	2:39:19	Baba Ibrahim Suma-Keita (SLE)	2:53:08	U. Bashiru (NGR)	2:53:57
110 m hurdles	Godwin Obasogie (NGR)	13.97	Abdoulaye Sarr (SEN)	14.48	Thomas Nnakwe (NGR)	14.65
400 m hurdles	Martin Fyneface (NGR)	50.80	Timo Ogunjobi (NGR)	51.01	Joe Appiagyei (GHA)	52.18
3000 metres Steeplechase	Joseph Wubala (NGR)	9:21.76	Cheikh Dieng (SEN)	9:32.53	O. Ladomi (NGR)	9:46.9a
High jump	Johnson Ileleji (NGR)	2.07	Lamine Ndao (SEN)	2.02	Wilson Amonfo (GHA)	2.02
Pole vault	Christopher Elili (NGR)	4.42	Tony Urhobo (NGR)	4.30	Abass Goudiaby (SEN)	4.20
Long jump	Charlton Ehizuelen (NGR)	7.92	Emmanuel Mifetu (GHA)	7.73	Joshua Kio (NGR)	7.49
Triple jump	Charlton Ehizuelen (NGR)	16.55	John Dodoo (GHA)	16.04	Moise Pomaney (GHA)	15.80
Shot put	Silas Ogwama (NGR)	15.81	Christopher Okonkwo (NGR)	15.60	Alfred Sumaila (GHA)	15.35
Discus throw	Harrison Salami (NGR)	53.34	Tiékité Somet (CIV)	52.12	Ibrahima Guèye (SEN)	50.68
Hammer throw	Louis Nwagbode (NGR)	46.56	Ebewele Brown (NGR)	45.28	Nicolas Gbeku (GHA)	41.64
Javelin throw	Jacques Ayé Abehi (CIV)	68.33	Djié Gagné (CIV)	66.52	Ludwig Sackey (GHA)	65.46
4 × 100 m relay	Nigeria	39.73	Ivory Coast	39.86	Ghana	39.92
4 × 400 m relay	Nigeria	3:07.87	Ghana	3:12.81	Ivory Coast	3:14.70

=== Women ===
Event	Gold		Silver		Bronze	
100 metres	Utifon Ufon Oko (NGR)	11.72	Hannah Afriyie (GHA)	11.76	Rufina Ubah (NGR)	11.97
200 metres	Hannah Afriyie (GHA)	23.60	Utifon Ufon Oko (NGR)	23.92	Grace Bakari (GHA)	24.28
400 metres	Grace Bakari (GHA)	53.92	Mary Akinyemi (NGR)	55.13	Kehinde Vaughan (NGR)	55.88
800 metres	Helena Opoku (GHA)	2:08.83	Joa Afrakuma (GHA)	2:10.5a	Comfort Ighagbon (NGR)	2:10.7a
1500 metres	Ndew Niang (SEN)	4:36.9a	Grace Ebukuyo (NGR)	4:37.4a	Iyabo Ajayi (NGR)	4:43.8a
100 m hurdles	Modupe Oshikoya (NGR)	13.93	Judy Bell-Gam (NGR)	14.30	Elizabeth Bruce (GHA)	14.38
High jump	R. Agbeja (NGR)	1.63	Rose Jackson (NGR)	1.63	Emilia Blavo (GHA)	1.60
Long jump	Modupe Oshikoya (NGR)	6.30	Juliana Mensah (GHA)	6.11	Janet Yawson (GHA)	5.95
Shot put	N. Udu (NGR)	13.06	Nnenna Njoku (NGR)	12.99	Rose Hart (GHA)	12.81
Discus throw	Nnenna Njoku (NGR)	43.66	Rose Hart (GHA)	43.56	Caroline Achugbu (NGR)	40.64
Javelin throw	Nnenna Njoku (NGR)	43.60	Theresa Iwobi (NGR)	42.23	Ajara Kawuribi (GHA)	40.32
4 × 100 m relay	Ghana	45.13	Nigeria	45.29	Senegal	50.10
4 × 400 m relay	Ghana	3:41.51	Nigeria	3:42.26	Senegal	3:56.03
