= Athletics at the 1978 All-Africa Games =

Athletics at the III All-Africa Games
- Dates: 20–27 July 1978
- Host city: Algiers, Algeria

The third All-Africa Games were held in July 1978 in Algiers, Algeria.

New events were added to the athletics program; Decathlon and pentathlon, for men and women respectively, as well as men's 20 km road walk. Three nations also won their first medals at these championships these being Tunisia, Sudan and Upper Volta.

Malian discus thrower Namakoro Niaré won his third title, being the only athlete to do so. Four athletes, two male and two female, won more than one event:

- El Kashief Hassan, Sudan (200 metres and 400 metres)
- Hannah Afriyie, Ghana (100 metres and 200 metres)
- Charlton Ehizuelen, Nigeria (long jump and triple jump)
- Modupe Oshikoya, Nigeria (high jump and long jump)
- Nagui Asaad, Egypt, won his second Gold medal in Shot Put of the All Africa Games in 1978, Algeria, after his first in 1973, All-Africa Games Algeria Nigeria.

== Medal summary ==
=== Men's events ===
Event	Gold		Silver		Bronze	
100 metres (wind: -0.9 m/s)	Amadou Meïté; Côte d'Ivoire	10.35 GR	Peter Okodogbe; Nigeria	10.45	Ohene Karikari; Ghana	10.46
200 metres (wind: +0.6 m/s)	Hassan El Kachief; Sudan	20.77 GR, NR	Patrice Ouré; Côte d'Ivoire	20.90	Roland Joe Siai-Siai; Nigeria	20.98
400 metres	Hassan El Kachief; Sudan	45.32 GR	Dele Udo; Nigeria	45.65	Cyril Etoori; Uganda	45.65
800 metres	James Maina; Kenya	1:47.14	Amar Brahmia; Algeria	1:47.54	Peter Lemashon; Kenya	1:47.83
1500 metres	Filbert Bayi; Tanzania	3:36.21 GR	Wilson Waigwa; Kenya	3:36.48	Amar Brahmia; Algeria	3:37.33
5000 metres	Yohannes Mohamed; Ethiopia	13:44.39 GR	Mike Musyoki; Kenya	13:44.79	Suleiman Nyambui; Tanzania	13:49.60
10,000 metres	Henry Rono; Kenya	27:58.90 GR	Mike Musyoki; Kenya	28:05.20	Mohamed Kedir; Ethiopia	28:42.00
Marathon	Richard Mabuza; Swaziland	2:21:53 GR	Dereje Nedi; Ethiopia	2:23:08	Girma Guebre; Ethiopia	2:27:35
3000 metre steeplechase	Henry Rono; Kenya	8:15.82 GR	James Munyala; Kenya	8:25.68	Kip Rono; Kenya	8:26.38
110 metres hurdles (wind: -0.5 m/s)	Fatwell Kimaiyo; Kenya	13.89 GR	Philip Sang; Kenya	14.02	Thomas Nnakwe; Nigeria	14.35
400 metres hurdles	Daniel Kimaiyo; Kenya	49.48	John Akii-Bua; Uganda	49.55	Peter Rwamuhanda; Uganda	50.18
4 × 100 metres relay	Ghana; Ernest Obeng; Albert Lomotey; George Enchill; Ohene Karikari	39.24 GR	Nigeria; Peter Okodogbe; Roland Siai-Siai; James Olakunle; Kolawode Abdulai	39.39	Congo; Jean-Pierre Bassegela; Louis Nkanza; Théophile Nkounkou; Antoine Kiakouama	39.79
4 × 400 metres relay	Nigeria; Olurotimi Peters; Ahmed Garba; Felix Imadiyi; Dele Udo	3:03.24 GR	Uganda; John Akii-Bua; Silver Ayoo; Mike Okot; Cyril Etoori	3:04.20	Kenya	3:05.92
20 kilometre road walk	Benamar Kachkouche; Algeria	1:39:21	Hunde Ture; Egypt	1:39:51	Elisha Kasuka; Kenya	1:43:21
High jump	Paul Ngadjadoum; Chad	2.16 GR	Hamid Sahil; Algeria	2.14	Amadou Dia Bâ; Senegal	2.08
Pole vault	Lakhdar Rahal; Algeria	5.00	Ahmed Rezki; Algeria	4.80	Mohamed Bensaad; Algeria	4.80
Long jump	Charlton Ehizuelen; Nigeria	7.92	Fidelis Ndyabagye; Uganda	7.75 NR	Emmanuel Mifetu; Ghana	7.57
Triple jump	Charlton Ehizuelen; Nigeria	16.51	Abdoulaye Diallo; Senegal	16.29	Saïd Saad; Algeria	15.93
Shot put	Youssef Nagui Asaad; Egypt	18.88	Namakoro Niaré; Mali	17.16	Emad Fayez; Egypt	16.93
Discus throw	Namakoro Niaré; Mali	58.02 GR	Abderrazak Ben Hassine; Tunisia	55.74	Tiékité Somet; Côte d'Ivoire	51.86
Hammer throw	Youssef Ben Abid; Tunisia	54.90 GR	Abdellah Boubekeur; Algeria	54.74	Noureddine Bendifallah; Algeria	52.20
Javelin throw	Justin Arop; Uganda	76.94	Ali Memmi; Tunisia	71.28	John Mayaka; Kenya	70.76
Decathlon	Mohamed Bensaad; Algeria	7338	Brown Ebewele; Nigeria	6876	Alain Smaïl; Algeria	6822

=== Women's events ===
Event	Gold		Silver		Bronze	
100 metres	Hannah Afriyie; Ghana	11.50	Utifon Ufon Oko; Nigeria	11.55	Kemi Sandgodeyi; Nigeria	11.92
200 metres (wind: +0.1 m/s)	Hannah Afriyie; Ghana	23.01	Kehinde Vaughan; Nigeria	23.70	Ruth Waithera; Kenya	23.91
400 metres	Kehinde Vaughan; Nigeria	53.86	Ruth Kyalisima; Uganda	54.49	Georgina Aidou; Ghana	54.84
800 metres	Tekla Chemabwai; Kenya	2:04.84	Sakina Boutamine; Algeria	2:05.64	Célestine N'Drin; Côte d'Ivoire	2:06.08
1500 metres	Sakina Boutamine; Algeria	4:16.43	Anna Kiprop; Kenya	4:19.59	Rose Thomson; Kenya	4:20.07
100 metres hurdles	Judy Bell-Gam; Nigeria	13.67	Ruth Kyalisima; Uganda	13.92 NR	Bella Bell-Gam; Nigeria	13.99
4 × 100 metres relay	Nigeria; Utifon Ufon Oko; Kemi Sandgodeyi; Fosa Ibini; Bella Bell-Gam	44.63	Ghana; Hannah Afriyie; Grace Bakari; Jeanette Yawson; Jeanette Ofusu	45.19	Uganda; Farida Kyakutema; Ruth Kyalisima; Christine Kabanda; Jane Nakamate	46.77
4 × 400 metres relay	Ghana; Helena Opoku; Grace Bakari; Georgina Aidoo; Hannah Afriyie	3:35.55 (NR)	Kenya; Tekla Chemabwai; Rose Tata-Muya; Ruth Waithera; Charity Muhuhe	3:39.27	Uganda; Farida Kyakutema; Ruth Kyalisima; Margaret Komugisha; Jane Nakamate	3:39.94
High jump	Modupe Oshikoya; Nigeria	1.77	Kawther Akrémi; Tunisia	1.73	Emilia Blavo; Ghana	1.68
Long jump	Modupe Oshikoya; Nigeria	6.32	Jeanette Yawson; Ghana	6.29	Bella Bell-Gam; Nigeria	6.12
Shot put	Joyce Aciro; Uganda	14.47 NR	Veronica Baawah; Ghana	12.88	Herina Malit; Kenya	12.70
Discus throw	Fathia Jerbi; Tunisia	46.56	Helen Alyek; Uganda	45.90 NR	Martha Jugah; Nigeria	45.02
Javelin throw	Eunice Nekesa; Kenya	51.58	Agnès Tchuinté; Cameroon	49.16	Constance Rwabiryagye; Uganda	45.52
Pentathlon	Bella Bell-Gam; Nigeria	3709	Margaret Bisereko; Uganda	3788	Madeleine Bonzi; Upper Volta	3427

== Medal table ==
Rank	Nation	Gold	Silver	Bronze	Total
1	Nigeria	9	6	6	21
2	Kenya	7	7	8	22
3	Algeria	4	5	5	14
4	Ghana	4	3	4	11
5	Uganda	2	7	5	14
6	Tunisia	2	3	0	5
7	Sudan	2	0	0	2
8	Ethiopia	1	1	2	4
8	Ivory Coast	1	1	2	4
10	Egypt	1	1	1	3
11	Mali	1	1	0	2
12	Tanzania	1	0	1	2
13	Chad	1	0	0	1
13	(Eswatini) Swaziland	1	0	0	1
15	Senegal	0	1	1	2
16	Cameroon	0	1	0	1
17	Congo	0	0	1	1
17	Upper Volta	0	0	1	1
Totals (18 entries)		37	37	37	111
