= Amsale Woldegibriel =

Ethiopian middle-distance runner

Personal information
- Nationality: Ethiopian
- Born: 8 October 1960 (age 65)

Sport
- Sport: Middle-distance running
- Event: 1500 metres
Medal record
Women's athletics
Representing Ethiopia
African Championships
Bronze medal – third place	1979 Dakar	800 m

Amsale Woldegibriel (Note: also spelled Amsala or Woldegebriel) (born 8 October 1960) is an Ethiopian middle-distance runner. She won the first-ever African Championships women's medal for Ethiopia in 1979 and later set the Ethiopian 1500 metres national record. She competed in the women's 1500 metres at the 1980 Summer Olympics.

== Career ==
Woldegibriel entered in the 800 metres at the 1979 African Championships in Athletics. She ran 2:11.9 to win the bronze medal behind Mary Chemweno and Rose Tata-Muya. She was the first Ethiopian to medal at the women's African Championships and the only to medal at the inaugural edition.

Woldegibriel was seeded in the first 1500 metres semi-final at the 1980 Olympics. She ran a time of 4:25.30 to place 10th. Her time was a personal best.

Woldegibriel's time of 4:25.30 was an Ethiopian national record over 1500 m.
