= Ofili =

Ofili is a surname. Notable people with the surname include:

- Chris Ofili (born 1968), British artist
- Cindy Ofili (born 1994), American-born British track and field athlete
- Edward Ofili (born 1957), Nigerian sprinter
- Elizabeth Ofili (born 1956), Nigerian cardiologist
- Favour Ofili (born 2002), Nigerian track and field athlete
- Tiffany Ofili (born 1987), American-born British track and field athlete
