= Athletics at the 1981 Summer Universiade – Women's shot put =

The women's shot put event at the 1981 Summer Universiade was held at the Stadionul Naţional in Bucharest on 25 July 1981.

== Results ==
Rank	Athlete	Nationality	Result	Notes
1st place, gold medalist(s)	Helma Knorscheidt	East Germany	20.24	
2nd place, silver medalist(s)	Ines Müller	East Germany	19.66	
3rd place, bronze medalist(s)	Lyudmila Savina	Soviet Union	18.50	
4	Mioara Boros	Romania	17.21	
5	Shen Lijuan	China	17.17	
6	Tatiana Mihalcea	Romania	15.96	
7	Sandra Burke	United States	14.88	
8	Grace Apiafi	Nigeria	14.18	
9	Neni Davis	United States	13.02	
