= Eshetu Tura =

Ethiopian long-distance runner

Medal record

Men's Athletics

Representing Ethiopia

Olympic Games
Bronze medal – third place	1980 Moscow	3000 m st.

African Championships
Gold medal – first place	1982 Cairo	3000 m st.
Silver medal – second place	1979 Dakar	3000 m st.
Silver medal – second place	1982 Cairo	5000 m

Representing Africa

IAAF World Cup
Silver medal – second place	1977 Düsseldorf	3000 m steeplechase

Eshetu Tura (Amharic: አሸቱ ቱራ, born 19 January 1950) is a retired long-distance runner from Ethiopia. He won a bronze medal in 3,000 metres steeplechase at the 1980 Summer Olympics.

== Career ==
Tura won the silver medal behind Kip Rono at the first African Championships in 1979. In the 1982 edition, he won the steeplechase competition as well as a silver in 5000 metres.

Tura is currently working as a steeplechase coach for the Ethiopian national athletics team, where he also served as a coach for the late Somalian middle-distance athlete Samia Yusuf Omar.

== Achievements ==
Year	Competition	Venue	Position	Event	Notes
Representing Ethiopia
1979	African Championships	Dakar, Senegal	2nd	3000 m steeple	8:31.4
1982	African Championships	Cairo, Egypt	2nd	5000 m	13:50.33
1982	African Championships	Cairo, Egypt	1st	3000 m steeple	8:30.47
