= Nigusse Bekele =

Ethiopian middle-distance runner

Personal information
- Nationality: Ethiopian
- Born: 9 November 1959 (age 66) Ethiopia
- Height: 185 cm (6 ft 1 in)
- Weight: 55 kg (121 lb)

Sport
- Country: Ethiopia
- Sport: Middle-distance running

Nigusse Bekele is an Ethiopian Olympic middle-distance runner. He represented his country in the men's 1500 meters and the men's 800 meters at the 1980 Summer Olympics. His time was a 3:45.79 in the 1500, and a 1:51.10 in the 800 heats.
