= Judy Bell-Gam =

Nigerian athletics competitor

Personal information
- Nationality: Nigerian
- Born: August 24, 1956 (age 69)

Sport
- Country: Nigeria
- Sport: Track and field
- Event: 100 metres hurdles
Medal record
Women's athletics
Representing Nigeria
All-Africa Games
Gold medal – first place	1978 Algiers	100 m hurdles
African Championships
Gold medal – first place	1979 Dakar	100 m hurdles

Judy Bell-Gam (born August 24, 1956) is a Nigerian former track and field athlete. She won the 100 metres hurdles for Nigeria at the first African Championships in Dakar in 1979 and also was Nigeria's first winner in that event at the 1978 All-Africa Games.

== Life ==
Bell-Gam and her twin sister, Bella, were born in Opobo Town, Rivers State in 1956. They would both become athletes. They attended the Government Primary School in Afikpo, the Methodist School, Uwani in the state of Enugu and the Union Secondary School, Ikot Ekpene . The girls were in Enugu when the Nigerian Civil War started in 1967 and they moved south to Nnewi. At the end of the war, Bell-Gam returned to school in Ikot Ekpene. Among her first international honours was a silver medal in the 100 m hurdles at the 1977 West African Games, finishing second on home turf behind her compatriot Modupe Oshikoya.

Judy Bell-Gam won the gold medal in the 100 m hurdles at the African Games in 1978 in Algiers in a time of 13.67 s, ahead of Ugandan Ruth Kyalisima and her twin sister Bella Bell-Gam. At the African Athletics Championships in Dakar in 1979, she ran 14.13 s in the same discipline in front of her sister and the Moroccan Fatima El Faquir and received the gold medal. Subsequently, at the 1979 IAAF World Cup in Montreal she ran the 100 n hurdles in 13.93 and was seventh. She was also the winner of the hurdles at the All-Africa University Games that year.

== Legacy ==
In 2018 Oluwatobiloba Amusan won her first African Championships title in the hurdles at the Asaba African Championships. This extended a Nigerian tradition in the event, started by Bell-Gam, with other Nigerian victors including Maria Usifo, Ime Akpan, Glory Alozie, Olutoyin Augustus, Seun Adigun, who had won this race for Nigeria at the first African Championships.

== International competitions ==
Year	Competition	Venue	Position	Event	Notes
1977	West African Games	Lagos, Nigeria	2nd	100 m hurdles	14.30
1978	All-Africa Games	Algiers, Algeria	1st	100 m hurdles	13.67
1979	African Championships	Dakar, Senegal	1st	100 m hurdles	14.13
1979	All-Africa University Games	Nairobi, Kenya	1st	100 m hurdles	14.2
1979	World Cup	Montreal, Canada	7th	100 m hurdles	13.93

== See also ==
- List of African Games medalists in athletics (women)
- List of African Championships in Athletics medalists (women)
