= Charles Moses (sprinter) =

Ghanaian sprinter (born 1954)

Personal information
- Born: 12 March 1954 (age 72) Ghana

Sport
- Sport: Sprinting
- Event: 400 metres

Achievements and titles
- Personal bests: 48.2 (1980, confirmed); 45.71 (1984, questionable); 45.28 (1979, claimed)

Charles Moses (born 12 March 1954) is a Ghanaian former sprinter. Based in the United States, he competed in the men's 400 metres for Ghana at the 1984 Summer Olympics.

== Biography ==
Moses was born on 12 March 1954. He is a native of Ghana. From the winter of 1978 to the spring of 1979, Moses attended Iowa State University in the U.S., where he competed as a walk-on for the Iowa State Cyclones track and field team during his time there. Beginning in 1980, he transferred to and ran for the Rochester Community and Technical College in Rochester, Minnesota. While there, he won the state junior college championships and qualified for the rounds of the NJCAA national track and field championships in the 400 m. He was coached by Liz McBlain. His fastest confirmed time was 48.2 seconds during the spring 1980 season for Rochester CC, where he competed while dealing with an ankle injury.

Described as one of Rochester College's most prominent freshman sprinters and a "Ghana Olympian" by the Post-Bulletin in April 1980, Moses received service club and church donations in the lead-up to the Olympics that year. In an interview with the Post-Bulletin in August 1980, Moses claimed to have competed in the 400 metres at the 1980 Summer Olympics in Moscow, competing for Ghana as the United States team boycotted the Games and as the first Olympian from Rochester Community College. He said he ran 45.3 seconds in the quarter-finals and 45.9 seconds his semi-final to place sixth, failing to qualify for the finals by two places. He also claimed to have run with Alberto Juantorena and eventual gold medalist Viktor Markin in his rounds. On 16 September 1980, Moses told the Post-Bulletin that due to visa problems, he had run at the Games under the name Dele Udo, which explained his name not being present in the results. However, the following day, he admitted to the newspaper that he had fabricated his claims, and that he did not run in the 1980 Olympics at all.

Four years later, Moses actually competed at the 1984 Summer Olympics for Ghana, where he split 50.39 seconds to place seventh in his Olympic 400 m heat and failed to advance. According to Bill Mallon, Moses set his personal best of 45.71 seconds in 1984.

Moses eventually enrolled at Mankato State University in Minnesota, where he studied computer science, but did not run for the track team there. He worked for Control Data in Minneapolis for six years. He then moved to Tri-Cities area in Washington and started his own company in Richland. In Washington, Moses coached the Richland Exchange Track Club. In 1990, at age 36, he was running six to eight miles a day, hoping to qualify to represent Ghana at the Goodwill Games in Seattle. He later went on to work for companies including Lockheed Martin and SunnComm.

== See also ==
- Moli Yeski Yusef
- Rosie Ruiz
