= 1979 African Championships in Athletics =

- Dates: 2–5 August
- Host city: Dakar, Senegal

The 1979 African Championships in Athletics were held in the Stade Iba Mar Diop in Dakar, Senegal, between 2 and 5 August. There were a total number of 251 competitors from 24 countries, with 23 men's and 16 women's events.

== Medal summary ==
"a" denotes electronic timing was used.

=== Men's events ===
Event	Gold		Silver		Bronze	
100 metres (wind: -1.3 m/s)	Ernest Obeng; Ghana	10.54	Théophile Nkounkou; Congo	10.63	Edward Ofili; Nigeria	10.66
200 metres (wind: +1.2 m/s)	Edward Ofili; Nigeria	20.90	Georges Kablan Degnan; Côte d'Ivoire	21.14	Emmanuel Bitanga; Cameroon	21.18
400 metres	El Kashief Hassan; Sudan	45.34	James Atuti; Kenya	45.95	Billy Konchellah; Kenya	46.28
800 metres	James Maina; Kenya	1:48.8 a	Omer Khalifa; Sudan	1:49.3 a	Mehdi Aidet; Algeria	1:49.8 a
1500 metres	Mike Boit; Kenya	3:39.9 a	Abderrahmane Morceli; Algeria	3:40.1 a	Mehdi Aidet; Algeria	3:40.5 a
5000 metres	Miruts Yifter; Ethiopia	14:14.0 a	Yohannes Mohamed; Ethiopia	14:14.2 a	Kip Rono; Kenya	14:18.0 a
10000 metres	Miruts Yifter; Ethiopia	29:08.0 a	Yohannes Mohamed; Ethiopia	29:10.0 a	Rachid Habchaoui; Algeria	29:28.9 a
Marathon	Kebede Balcha; Ethiopia	2:29:53	Gidamis Shahanga; Tanzania	2:36:46	Ladislas Hakuzimana; Rwanda	2:54:28
3000 metre steeplechase	Kip Rono; Kenya	8:30.9 a	Eshetu Tura; Ethiopia	8:31.4 a	Yohannes Mohamed; Ethiopia	8:39.4 a
110 metres hurdles (wind: +2.2 m/s)	Godwin Obasogie; Nigeria	13.76 w	Philip Sang; Kenya	13.81 w	Thomas Nnakwe; Nigeria	14.03 w
400 metres hurdles	Daniel Kimaiyo; Kenya	50.05	Wilson Kibiego; Kenya	51.06	Dennis Otono; Nigeria	51.23
4 × 100 metres relay	Côte d'Ivoire; Georges Kablan Degnan; Amadou Meïté; Avognan Nogboum; Patrice Oure Etchie	39.80	Senegal; Boubacar Diallo; Cheikh Touradou Diouf; Momar N'Dao; Yoro Diba	41.60	Tanzania; Ally Mwalimu; David Lukuba; Peter Mwita; Juamne Chobanga	41.71
4 × 400 metres relay	Kenya; James Atuti; Billy Konchellah; Daniel Kimaiyo; Wilson Kibiego	3:08.2 a	Nigeria; Hope Ezeigbo; Dele Udo; Ahmed Garba; Ludwig Ordia	3:10.2 a	Senegal	3:11.5 a
10,000 metre track walk	Benamar Kachkouche; Algeria	48:50.8 a	Hunde Ture; Ethiopia	50:45.6 a	John Mutinda; Kenya	55:45.2 a
High jump	Othmane Belfaa; Algeria	2.15	Hamid Sahil; Algeria	2.13	Moussa Sagna Fall; Senegal	2.05
Pole vault	Mohamed Bensaad; Algeria	4.70	Loué Legbo; Côte d'Ivoire	4.60	Ahmed Rezki; Algeria	4.50
Long jump	Ajayi Agbebaku; Nigeria	7.94	Kayode Elegbede; Nigeria	7.89	Joseph Kio; Nigeria	7.78
Triple jump	Ajayi Agbebaku; Nigeria	16.82 w	Abdoulaye Diallo; Senegal	16.42 w	Joseph Kio; Nigeria	16.25 w
Shot put	Youssef Nagui Asaad; Egypt	20.32	Mohamed Fatihi; Morocco	15.80	Abderrazak Ben Hassine; Tunisia	14.42
Discus throw	Abderrazak Ben Hassine; Tunisia	54.60	Mohamed Naguib Hamed; Egypt	54.40	Harrison Salami; Nigeria	53.10
Hammer throw	Abdellah Boubekeur; Algeria	56.02	Youssef Ben Abid; Tunisia	53.84	Hisham Fouad Greiss; Egypt	49.10
Javelin throw	Jacques Ayé Abehi; Côte d'Ivoire	76.74	Zakayo Malekwa; Tanzania	76.06	Tarek Chaabani; Tunisia	75.20
Decathlon	Mohamed Bensaad; Algeria	7148	Ebewele Brown; Nigeria	7043	Alioune Seck; Senegal	6741

=== Women's events ===
Event	Gold		Silver		Bronze	
100 metres (wind: +2.2 m/s)	Oguzoeme Nsenu; Nigeria	11.53 w	Hannah Afriyie; Ghana	11.56 w	Nzaeli Kyomo; Tanzania	11.59 w
200 metres (wind: +1.6 m/s)	Hannah Afriyie; Ghana	23.81	Nzaeli Kyomo; Tanzania	24.48	Ruth Waithera; Kenya	24.66
400 metres	Grace Bakari; Ghana	53.33	Marième Boye; Senegal	54.52	Mary Chemweno; Kenya	55.41
800 metres	Mary Chemweno; Kenya	2:08.4 a	Rose Tata; Kenya	2:10.9 a	Amsala Woldegebriel; Ethiopia	2:11.9 a
1500 metres	Sakina Boutamine; Algeria	4:23.6 a	Rose Thomson; Kenya	4:25.0 a	Hassania Darami; Morocco	4:26.5 a
3000 metres	Sakina Boutamine; Algeria	9:31.1 a	Rose Thomson; Kenya	9:32.1 a	Hassania Darami; Morocco	9:39.7 a
100 metres hurdles (wind: -1.1 m/s)	Judy Bell-Gam; Nigeria	14.13	Bella Bell-Gam; Nigeria	14.36	Fatima El Faquir; Morocco	14.52
400 metres hurdles	Fatima El Faquir; Morocco	59.73	Rose Tata; Kenya	59.85	Ruth Kyalisima; Uganda	60.41
4 × 100 metres relay	Ghana; Hannah Afriyie; Grace Bakari; Jeanette Yawson; Jeanette Ofusu	45.63	Nigeria; Obuzoene Nsenu; Rufina Ubah; Fosa Ibini; Alaba Ojumola	46.45	Senegal; Marième Boye; Françoise Damado; Fatou Cissoko; Maty N'Diaye	50.23
4 × 400 metres relay	Ghana; Hannah Afriyie; Grace Bakari; Georgina Aidou; Gladys Konadu	3:41.8 a	Kenya; Rose Tata-Muya; Ruth Waithera; Mary Chemweno ?	3:46.1 a	Nigeria; Gloria Ayanyala; Kehinde Vaughan; Asele Woy; Joan Elumelu	3:54.9 a
High jump	Kawther Akrémi; Tunisia	1.69	Elizabeth Ezo; Nigeria	1.69	Fernande Agnentchoué; Gabon	1.63
Long jump	Bella Bell-Gam; Nigeria	6.24	Florence Ochonogor; Nigeria	6.18	Jeanette Yawson; Ghana	6.04
Shot put	Odette Mistoul; Gabon	13.45	Grace Apiafi; Nigeria	13.24	Joyce Aciro; Uganda	12.95
Discus throw	Zoubida Laayouni; Morocco	46.18	Fathia Jerbi; Tunisia	45.18	Helen Alyek; Uganda	43.04
Javelin throw	Agnès Tchuinté; Cameroon	50.20	Eunice Nekesa; Kenya	49.98	Constance Rwabiryagye; Uganda	41.64
Pentathlon	Bella Bell-Gam; Nigeria	3607	Florence Ochonogor; Nigeria	3524	Julie-Marie Gomis; Senegal	3409

== Medal table ==
Rank	Nation	Gold	Silver	Bronze	Total
1	Nigeria (NGR)	8	9	7	24
2	Algeria (ALG)	7	2	4	13
3	Kenya (KEN)	6	9	5	20
4	Ghana (GHA)	5	1	1	7
5	Ethiopia (ETH)	3	4	2	9
6	Tunisia (TUN)	2	2	2	6
7	Ivory Coast (CIV)	2	2	0	4
8	Morocco (MAR)	2	1	3	6
9	Egypt (EGY)	1	1	1	3
10	Sudan (SUD)	1	1	0	2
11	Cameroon (CMR)	1	0	1	2
11	Gabon (GAB)	1	0	1	2
13	Senegal (SEN)	0	3	5	8
14	Tanzania (TAN)	0	3	2	5
15	Congo (CGO)	0	1	0	1
16	Uganda (UGA)	0	0	4	4
17	Rwanda (RWA)	0	0	1	1
Totals (17 entries)		39	39	39	117
