= Fatma Zouhour Toumi =

Tunisian javelin thrower

Medal record

Women's athletics

Representing Tunisia

African Championships
| Gold medal – first place | 1996 Yaoundé | Javelin throw |

Fatma Zouhour Toumi (born 1 May 1971) is a retired Tunisian javelin thrower.

She won the silver medal at the 1995 All-Africa Games and the gold medal at the 1996 African Championships.
