= Daniel Kimaiyo =

Kenyan hurdler

Medal record

Men's athletics

Representing Kenya

Commonwealth Games
Gold medal – first place	1978 Edmonton	400 m hurdles
Gold medal – first place	1978 Edmonton	4×400 m relay

All-Africa Games
Gold medal – first place	1978 Algiers	400 m hurdles
Bronze medal – third place	1978 Algiers	4×400 m relay

African Championships
Gold medal – first place	1979 Dakar	400 m hurdles
Gold medal – first place	1979 Dakar	4×400 m relay

Daniel Kimaiyo (born 11 January 1948) is a Kenyan former track and field athlete who is specialised in the 400 metres hurdles.

He became the first African to win the 400 m hurdles title at the Commonwealth Games in 1978, doing so in a time of 49.48 seconds after setting a lifetime best of 49.20 seconds in qualifying. He also led off the Kenyan 4×400 metres relay quartet to win a second gold in a Games record of 3:03.54 minutes. That year he also secured a continental title at the 1978 All-Africa Games, succeeding John Akii-Bua, and won a relay bronze with Kenya.

Kimaiyo won a second continental title at the 1979 African Championships in Athletics, where he was the inaugural 400 m hurdles champion. With the 4 × 400 m relay team he also helped his nation to the first ever title. In addition to these titles, he was the winner of the hurdles at the East and Central African Championships.

== See also ==
- List of champions of the African Athletics Championships
