= Janet Yawson =

Ghanaian long jumper (born 1957)

Medal record

Women's athletics

Representing Ghana

African Championships
Gold medal – first place	1979 Dakar	4×100 m
Bronze medal – third place	1979 Dakar	Long jump

Janet Yawson (born 3 April 1957) is a retired Ghanaian long jumper.

== Early life ==
Yawson was born in 1957 in Ghana to a Ghanaian father and a Lebanese mother.

== Local Competition ==
Her personal best jump was 6.35 metres, achieved in May 1979 in Kumasi

== International Competition ==
In 1978 she finished sixth at the Commonwealth Games and won a silver medal at the All-Africa Games. She won the bronze medal at the 1979 African Championships.

On 6 September, 1981. Janet finished on 9th position on Long Jump at the IAAF World cup at the Stadio Olympico, Roma. Italy. Her result was 5.70 on the category GL with a Wind of 0.0.
