= Nnenna Njoku =

Nigerian athlete

Personal information
- Nationality: Nigerian
- Born: 18 March 1955 (age 71)
- Height: 163 cm (5 ft 4 in)
- Weight: 57 kg (126 lb)

Sport
- Sport: Athletics
- Events: High jump Shot put

Nnenna Njoku-Mbonu (born 18 March 1955) is a Nigerian retired athlete who competed ta the 1972 Summer Olympics.

== Biography ==
Njoku finished third behind Janet Honour in the pentathlon event at the British 1971 WAAA Championships and second behind Pam Ryan in the 200 metres hurdles event at the 1972 WAAA Championships.

At the 1972 Olympics Games in Munich, she represented Nigeria in the women's high jump and the women's shot put competitions.
