= Kip Rono =

Kenyan former steeplechase runner (born 1958)

Medal record

Men's athletics

Representing Kenya

Commonwealth Games
Bronze medal – third place	1978 Edmonton	3000 m s'chase

All-Africa Games
Bronze medal – third place	1978 Algiers	3000 m s'chase

African Championships in Athletics
Gold medal – first place	1979 Dakar	3000 m s'chase
Bronze medal – third place	1979 Dakar	5000 m

IAAF World Cup
Gold medal – first place	1979 Montreal	3000 m s'chase

George Kiprotich "Kip" Rono (born 4 January 1958) is a Kenyan former steeplechase runner. He won a gold medal in the event at the 1979 African Championships in Athletics (becoming the inaugural champion) and was the first African steeplechase winner at the 1979 IAAF World Cup.

Rono ranked second fastest in the world in 1980 with a time of 8:12.0 minutes, but missed the 1980 Summer Olympics due to the boycott. He was a bronze medallist at both the Commonwealth Games and All-Africa Games in 1978, finishing behind Henry Rono. He represented his country at the World Championships in Athletics in 1983 and the Summer Olympics in 1984.

== Career ==
Rono first came to prominence at the age of twenty by winning bronze medals in the 3000 metres steeplechase at both the 1978 Commonwealth Games and the 1978 All-Africa Games. At both events, there was a Kenyan medal sweep led by Henry Rono and James Munyala. (Contemporary news reports stated that he was Henry Rono's brother.) The following year he established himself in his own right by winning steeplechase gold medals at the East and Central African Championships and the inaugural 1979 African Championships in Athletics (where he also claimed a 5000 metres bronze behind Ethiopia's Miruts Yifter and Yohannes Mohamed. His position as one of the world's leading steeplechasers was cemented at the 1979 IAAF World Cup, where he led by fifty metres before the last lap and became the first African man to win the steeplechase at that event.

The following year he was affected by the 1980 Summer Olympics boycott. Despite a run of 8:12.0 minutes at the Golden Gala in Rome – the second fastest that year after Bronisław Malinowski – he was unable to compete at a major competition. He did compete at the Liberty Bell Classic (Olympic Boycott Games) and while Malinowski took the steeplechase, Rono was the gold medallist in the 5000 m.

He won back-to-back steeplechase titles at the Kenyan Athletics Championships in 1983 to 1984. However, upon entering top level international competitions he proved to be past his best. At the 1983 World Championships in Athletics he ranked twentieth in the semi-finals with a time of 8:33.97 minutes. He went out in the first round at the 1984 Los Angeles Olympics, finishing ninth in his heat with a time of 8:41.75 minutes.

He declined in the steeplechase thereafter. His next international appearance came at the 1988 IAAF World Cross Country Championships. There he was part of a dominant Kenyan team led by John Ngugi which took all top nine placings (bar Ethiopia's Abebe Mekonnen in fifth). Rono shared in the team gold medals for his eighth-place finish.

Towards the end of his career, he focused on road running. In 1988 he was fourth at the Great Scottish Run and set a half marathon best of 1:00:52 hours to win the Semi Marathon du Lion. He was also runner-up at the Giro Podistico di Pettinengo and placed third at the AAA 10 Kilometres Championship.

== National titles ==
- Kenyan Athletics Championships
  - 3000 metres steeplechase: 1983, 1984

== International competitions ==
Year	Competition	Venue	Position	Event	Notes
1978	All-Africa Games	Algiers, Algeria	3rd	3000 m s'chase	8:26.38
1978	Commonwealth Games	Edmonton, Canada	3rd	3000 m s'chase	8:34.07
1979	East and Central African Championships	Mombasa, Kenya	1st	3000 m s'chase	8:33.8
1979	IAAF World Cup	Montreal, Canada	1st	3000 m s'chase	8:25.97
1980	Olympic Boycott Games	Philadelphia, United States	1st	5000 m	13:37.52
1983	World Championships	Helsinki, Finland	20th (semis)	3000 m s'chase	8:33.97
1984	Olympic Games	Los Angeles, United States	26th (q)	3000 m s'chase	8:41.75
1988	World Cross Country Championships	Auckland, New Zealand	8th	Senior race	35:46
1988	World Cross Country Championships	Auckland, New Zealand	1st	Team race	23 pts

== See also ==
- List of champions of the African Athletics Championships
