= Yohannes Mohamed =

Ethiopian long-distance runner

Medal record

Men's athletics

Representing Ethiopia

African Championships
Silver medal – second place	1979 Dakar	5000 m
Silver medal – second place	1979 Dakar	10,000 m
Bronze medal – third place	1979 Dakar	3000 m st.

Yohannes Mohammed (Amharic: ዮሐንስ መሐመድ; born 21 January 1948) is an Ethiopian former long-distance runner who competed in the 1972 Munich Olympics and the 1980 Moscow Olympics.
