= Rose Tata-Muya =

Kenyan athlete (born 1960)

Medal record

Women's athletics

Representing Kenya

African Championships
Silver medal – second place	1979 Dakar	800 m
Silver medal – second place	1979 Dakar	400 m hurdles
Silver medal – second place	1979 Dakar	4×400 m
Silver medal – second place	1990 Cairo	4×400 m
Bronze medal – third place	1982 Cairo	400 m hurdles

Rose Tata-Muya (born 12 June 1960) is a retired runner from Kenya who specialised mainly in the 400m hurdles. She won medals at the continental level and competed at the Olympics, World Championships and Commonwealth Games.

== Career ==
Tata-Muya was only 13 when she participated in her first international championships, the 1974 Commonwealth Games, where she achieved two 8th places: in the 800 metres race and as a part of the Kenyan 4×400 metres relay team. Four years later, she took part again at the Commonwealth Games reaching 800 metres semifinals.

Tata-Muya got two silver medals from the 1979 African Championshionships (400 m hurdles and 800 m). She is also a 400 m hurdles bronze medalist from the 1982 African Championships. In 1980 she took various events at the Commonwealth Games, the best result being 7th place with the Kenyan 4 × 400 m relay team. Her first global event were the inaugural world championships in 1983, where she did not get past 400 metres hurdles heats She was the only Kenyan woman athlete in Helsinki, and is thus the first Kenyan woman to compete at the world championships.

At the 1987 All-Africa Games in Nairobi, she won silver over 400 m hurdles. The same year she took part at the 1987 world championships, where she reached the 400 metres hurdles semifinals. She competed at the 1988 Summer Olympics, but did not get past 400 metres heats. Two years later she made her last Commonwealth games appearance, finishing 9th in the 400 m hurdles.

After retirement, she has served as a coach for the Kenyan team. She still takes veteran sports, as she competed at the 2007 World Masters Championships in Riccione, Italy. She currently serves as the Masters Athletics Kenya Secretary General. She has been awarded the Order of the Grand Warrior of Kenya and the Order of the Golden Heart of Kenya decorations. She still holds the Kenyan 400 metres hurdles record (as of 2007).

== Achievements ==
Year	Competition	Venue	Position	Event	Notes
Representing Kenya
1979	African Championships	Dakar, Senegal	2nd	800 m	2:10.9
1979	African Championships	Dakar, Senegal	2nd	400 m hurdles	59.85
1982	African Championships	Cairo, Egypt	3rd	400 m hurdles	60.9 s
1987	All-Africa Games	Nairobi, Kenya	2nd	400 m hurdles	55.94
