= Dele Udo =

Nigerian sprinter (1957–1981)

Personal information
- Nationality: Nigerian
- Born: Ndubuisi Udo; 24 May 1957 Umuahia, Nigeria
- Died: 15 July 1981 (aged 24) Lagos, Nigeria
- Height: 6.3 ft (192 cm)
- Weight: 168 lb (76 kg)

Sport
- Sport: Sprinting
- Events: 400 metres, quarter-mile, relays, hurdles
- College team: Missouri Tigers Track and Field
Medal record
Men's athletics
Representing Nigeria
African Championships
| Silver medal – second place | 1979 Dakar | 4×400 m |

Ndubuisi "Dele" Udo (24 May 1957 – 15 July 1981) was a Nigerian sprinter. He was a collegiate champion at the University of Missouri in the 1970s and competed in the men's 400 metres at the 1980 Summer Olympics, where he reached the semi-finals. He was shot dead in 1981, following an argument with a police officer in Lagos.

Udo ran for the University of Missouri, where he competed alongside teammate Godwin Obasogie. His identity was falsely claimed by Charles Moses in 1980.
