= Grace Apiafi =

Nigerian athletics competitor

Personal information
- Born: 27 November 1958 (age 67) Zaria, Nigeria

Sport
- Sport: Track and field
Medal record
Representing Nigeria
African Championships
Gold medal – first place	1988 Annaba	Discus throw
Silver medal – second place	1979 Dakar	Shot put

Grace Apiafi (born 27 November 1958) is a former track and field athlete from Nigeria, who competed in the shot put and discus throw events during her career. She represented her native West African country at the 1988 Summer Olympics in Seoul, South Korea, where she did not reach the final in either competition.

Apiafi is from Zaria, Nigeria. She was a Nigerian Athletics Championships winner in the shot put and discus before being signed to the Wyoming Cowgirls track and field team. In 1984, she was the African record-holder in the discus.

In 1990, Apifi was a collegiate leader in the shot put and discus for the Mt. SAC Mounties track and field team. She held the NJCAA record in the shot put. While a student at Mt. SAC, Apiafi housed Nigerian twins Davidson Ezinwa and Osmond Ezinwa.

Under the name Grace Apiafi-Russ, she began coaching the Pasadena City College track and field team in 1992. As of April 1992, Apiafi became a naturalized United States citizen and planned to compete at the 1992 United States Olympic trials.

== International competitions ==
Year	Competition	Venue	Position	Event	Notes
Representing Nigeria
1979	African Championships	Dakar, Senegal	2nd	Shot put	13.24 m
1988	African Championships	Annaba, Algeria	1st	Discus throw	50.60
1988	Olympic Games	Seoul, South Korea	22nd	Shot put	15.06 m
1988	Olympic Games	Seoul, South Korea	10th (q)	Discus throw	49.84 m
