= Godwin Obasogie =

Nigerian Olympian hurdler (born 1954)

Personal information
- Nationality: Nigerian
- Born: Godwin Obasogie; 25 January 1954 (age 72) Benin City, Nigeria
- Height: 185 cm (6 ft 1 in)
- Weight: 68 kg (150 lb)

Sport
- Sport: Sprinting
- Event: hurdles
- College team: Missouri Tigers Track and Field
Medal record
Men's athletics
Representing Nigeria
African Championships
Gold medal – first place	1979 Dakar	110m hurdles

Godwin Obasogie (born January 25, 1954) is a Nigerian Olympian hurdler.

Obasogie was an All-American as a freshman at the University of Missouri in 1975. As a member of the Nigerian Olympic team in 1976, he ran the 110m Hurdles.

Obasogie lived in St. Louis, Missouri and ran alongside teammate Dele Udo in college. In 1980, he spoke to the Post-Bulletin to confirm Udo's identity after another athlete claimed to have run under his name at the Olympics.
