= Jacques Ayé Abehi =

Ivorian javelin thrower (born 1942)

Medal record

Men's athletics

Representing Ivory Coast

African Championships
Gold medal – first place	1979 Dakar	Javelin throw

Jacques Ayé Abehi (born 1942) is an Ivorian former javelin thrower who competed in the 1972 Summer Olympics and in the 1976 Summer Olympics. He was the gold medallist at the 1973 All-Africa Games and the 1979 African Championships in Athletics. He held the African javelin throw record and was described as a "legend" of the sport and a "famous" athlete during his era.
