= Edward Ofili =

Nigerian sprinter

Personal information
- Born: 20 September 1957 (age 68)

Sport
- Country: Nigeria

Achievements and titles
- Personal best(s): 100 m: 10.42; 200 m: 20.87
Medal record
Men's athletics
Representing Nigeria
African Championships
| Gold medal – first place | 1979 Dakar | 200 m |
| Bronze medal – third place | 1979 Dakar | 100 m |

Edward ("Ed") Ofili (born 20 September 1957) is a Nigerian former sprinter who competed in the 1970s and specialized in 100 metres and 200 metres events. He was an Olympian, competing for Nigeria in 1976, and ran collegiate track and field for the University of Missouri He won a gold medal in 200 metres at the inaugural 1979 African Championships in Athletics.

== Achievements ==
| Year | Competition | Venue | Position | Event | Notes |
|---|---|---|---|---|---|
| 1979 | African Championships in Athletics | Dakar, Senegal | 3rd | 100 m | 10.66 |
| 1979 | African Championships in Athletics | Dakar, Senegal | 1st | 200 m | 20.90 |
