= Mary Chemweno =

Kenyan athletics competitor

Personal information
- Born: February 2, 1959 (age 67)

Sport
- Country: Kenya
- Sport: Athletics
- Events: 400 m, 800 m, 1500 m
Medal record
Women's athletics
Representing Kenya
African Championships
Gold medal – first place	1979 Dakar	800 m
Gold medal – first place	1985 Cairo	1500 m
Silver medal – second place	1979 Dakar	4×400 m
Silver medal – second place	1985 Cairo	800 m
Silver medal – second place	1985 Cairo	4×400 m
Bronze medal – third place	1979 Dakar	400 m

Mary Chemweno Koskei (2 February 1959) is a Kenyan former middle-distance runner who specialised in 400 m, 800 m and 1500 m events. She won the gold medal in the inaugural 1979 African Championships in 800 metres, and another gold medal six years later in 1500 metres at the 1985 edition. She is also a three-time Kenyan national champion, having won both the 400 and 800 metres events in 1981 as well as the 800 m event again in 1986. She married long-distance runner Kipsubai Koskei in the early 1980s.

== Achievements ==
Year	Competition	Venue	Position	Event	Notes
1979	African Championships	Dakar, Senegal	1st	800 m	2:08.4
1979	African Championships	Dakar, Senegal	3rd	400 m	55.41
1985	African Championships	Cairo, Egypt	1st	1500 m	4:17.90
1985	African Championships	Cairo, Egypt	2nd	800 m	2:04.58
1987	All-Africa Games	Nairobi, Kenya	3rd	800 m	2:04.34
