= Bella Bell-Gam =

Nigerian pentathlete

Personal information
- Born: 24 August 1956 (age 70) Rivers State
Medal record
Women's athletics
Representing Nigeria
African Championships
Gold medal – first place	1979 Dakar	Long jump
Gold medal – first place	1979 Dakar	Pentathlon
Silver medal – second place	1979 Dakar	100 m hurdles

Bella Bell-Gam (born August 24, 1956, in Rivers State) is a retired Nigerian pentathlete.

== Career ==
Bell-Gam was born in Opobo Town, Rivers State, she has a twin sister, Judy who was also an athlete. Both sisters attended Government Primary School, Afikpo, Methodist School, Uwani, Enugu and Union Secondary School, Ikot Ekpene. The girls where in Enugu when the Civil War broke out and moved southwards to Nnewi. At the end of the war, Bell-Gam returned to school in Ikot Ekpene. In 1973, she represented her school in high jump at the Hussey Shield and Lady Manuwa competitions. At the 2nd National Sports Festival in 1975, she switched to hurdles and won gold in her event. After secondary education, she attended Calabar College of Technology and represented the college at the NIPOGA games participating in the hurdles, high jump and long jump events. In the 3rd National Sports Festival, she chose to focus on high jump and long jump. From there, she was selected to represent the country in the Ecowas games and later at the All Africa Games. She won the gold medal in the 1978 All Africa Games held in Algiers, Algeria with 3709 points. She also won bronze medals in the 100m hurdles and long jump during the same competition achieving a time & distance of 13.99s and 6.12m respectively.
