= Grace Bakari =

Ghanaian sprinter (born 1954)

Personal information
- Nationality: Ghanaian
- Born: 27 April 1954 (age 72)

Sport
- Sport: Sprinting
- Event: 4 × 400 metres relay
Medal record
Women's athletics
Representing Ghana
African Championships
Gold medal – first place	1979 Dakar	400 m
Gold medal – first place	1979 Dakar	4×100 m
Gold medal – first place	1979 Dakar	4×400 m
Bronze medal – third place	1985 Cairo	400 m

Grace Bakari (born 27 April 1954) is a Ghanaian sprinter. She competed in the women's 4 × 400 metres relay at the 1984 Summer Olympics.

Bakari competed in the AIAW for the Oregon Ducks track and field team, finishing 6th in the 400 m at the 1980 AIAW Outdoor Track and Field Championships.
