= 1982 European Athletics Championships – Men's 3000 metres steeplechase =

Men's 3000 metres steeplechase at the European Athletics Championships

These are the official results of the Men's 3,000 metres Steeplechase event at the 1982 European Championships in Athens, Greece, held at Olympic Stadium "Spiros Louis" on 7 and 10 September 1982.

== Medalists ==
Gold	Patriz Ilg; West Germany
Silver	Bogusław Mamiński; Poland
Bronze	Domingo Ramón; Spain

== Results ==
=== Final ===
10 September

Rank	Name	Nationality	Time	Notes
1st place, gold medalist(s)	Patriz Ilg	West Germany	8:18.52	
2nd place, silver medalist(s)	Bogusław Mamiński	Poland	8:19.22	
3rd place, bronze medalist(s)	Domingo Ramón	Spain	8:20.48	
4	Hagen Melzer	East Germany	8:21.33	
5	Wolfgang Konrad	Austria	8:21.95	
6	Ilkka Äyräväinen	Finland	8:24.19	
7	Mariano Scartezzini	Italy	8:24.68	
8	Tommy Ekblom	Finland	8:27.15	
9	Colin Reitz	United Kingdom	8:28.87	
10	Graeme Fell	United Kingdom	8:34.30	
11	Juan José Torres	Spain	8:37.84	
12	Rainer Schwarz	West Germany	8:41.67	

=== Heats ===
7 September

==== Heat 1 ====
Rank	Name	Nationality	Time	Notes
1	Patriz Ilg	West Germany	8:22.65	Q
2	Mariano Scartezzini	Italy	8:23.11	Q
3	Ilkka Äyräväinen	Finland	8:23.18	Q
4	Colin Reitz	United Kingdom	8:23.86	q
5	Joseph Mahmoud	France	8:27.70	
6	Jan Hagelbrand	Sweden	8:28.02	
7	Peter Daenens	Belgium	8:28.64	
8	Guilherme Alves	Portugal	8:33.32	
9	Filippos Filippou	Cyprus	8:42.73	

==== Heat 2 ====
Rank	Name	Nationality	Time	Notes
1	Bogusław Mamiński	Poland	8:31.50	Q
2	Hagen Melzer	East Germany	8:31.99	Q
3	Tommy Ekblom	Finland	8:32.52	Q
4	Francisco Sánchez	Spain	8:33.10	
5	Krzysztof Wesołowski	Poland	8:35.33	
6	Arsenios Tsiminos	Greece	8:37.44	
7	Roger Hackney	United Kingdom	8:39.22	
8	Pascal Debacker	France	8:44.79	
9	Luciano Carchesio	Italy	8:50.35	

==== Heat 3 ====
Rank	Name	Nationality	Time	Notes
1	Domingo Ramón	Spain	8:22.11	Q
2	Wolfgang Konrad	Austria	8:23.40	Q
3	Graeme Fell	United Kingdom	8:23.76	Q
4	Juan José Torres	Spain	8:24.08	q
5	Rainer Schwarz	West Germany	8:25.21	q
6	Vesa Laukkanen	Finland	8:29.75	
7	Sergey Yepishin	Soviet Union	8:39.38	
8	Raymond Pannier	France	8:40.41	

== Participation ==
According to an unofficial count, 26 athletes from 15 countries participated in the event.

- Austria (1)
- Belgium (1)
- Cyprus (1)
- East Germany (1)
- Finland (3)
- France (3)
- Greece (1)
- Italy (2)
- Poland (2)
- Portugal (1)
- Soviet Union (1)
- Spain (3)
- Sweden (1)
- United Kingdom (3)
- West Germany (2)

== See also ==
- 1978 Men's European Championships 3,000m Steeplechase (Prague)
- 1980 Men's Olympic 3,000 m Steeplechase (Moscow)
- 1983 Men's World Championships 3,000m Steeplechase (Helsinki)
- 1984 Men's Olympic 3,000m Steeplechase (Los Angeles)
- 1986 Men's European Championships 3,000m Steeplechase (Stuttgart)
- 1987 Men's World Championships 3,000m Steeplechase (Rome)
- 1988 Men's Olympic 3,000m Steeplechase (Seoul)
