= 1987 World Championships in Athletics – Men's 3000 metres steeplechase =

These are the official results of the Men's 3.000 metres Steeplechase event at the 1987 IAAF World Championships in Rome, Italy. There were a total of 38 participating athletes, with three qualifying heats and the final held on Saturday 1987-09-05.

== Medalists ==
Gold	Francesco Panetta; Italy (ITA)
Silver	Hagen Melzer; East Germany (GDR)
Bronze	William Van Dijck; Belgium (BEL)

== Records ==
Existing records at the start of the event.

World Record	Henry Rono (KEN)	8:05.4	Seattle, USA	May 13, 1978
Championship Record	Patriz Ilg (FRG)	8:15.06	Helsinki, Finland	August 12, 1983

== Final ==
RANK	FINAL	TIME
	Francesco Panetta (ITA)	8:08.57 CR
	Hagen Melzer (GDR)	8:10.32
	William Van Dijck (BEL)	8:12.18
4.	Brian Diemer (USA)	8:14.46
5.	Graeme Fell (CAN)	8:16.46
6.	Henry Marsh (USA)	8:17.78
7.	Peter Koech (KEN)	8:20.08
8.	Patrick Sang (KEN)	8:20.45
9.	Alessandro Lambruschini (ITA)	8:24.25
10.	Raymond Pannier (FRA)	8:26.50
11.	José Regalo (POR)	8:27.64
12.	Patriz Ilg (FRG)	8:38.46
13.	Franco Boffi (ITA)	8:43.60
14.	Roger Hackney (GBR)	8:48.86
—	Joshua Kipkemboi (KEN)	DNF

== Qualifying heats ==
- Held on Thursday 1987-09-03

RANK	HEAT 1	TIME
1.	Francesco Panetta (ITA)	8:16.08
2.	Raymond Pannier (FRA)	8:16.93
3.	William Van Dijck (BEL)	8:19.19
4.	Patrick Sang (KEN)	8:22.26
5.	Eddie Wedderburn (GBR)	8:24.09
6.	Adauto Domingues (BRA)	8:26.67
7.	Béla Vágó (HUN)	8:27.24
8.	Francisco Sánchez (ESP)	8:34.29
9.	Michael Heist (FRG)	8:38.80
10.	Brian Abshire (USA)	8:39.97
11.	Liam O'Brien (IRL)	8:40.88
12.	Herman Hofstee (NED)	8:44.04
13.	Emilio Ulloa (CHI)	8:44.51

RANK	HEAT 2	TIME
1.	Joshua Kipkemboi (KEN)	8:20.75
2.	Hagen Melzer (GDR)	8:21.07
3.	Alessandro Lambruschini (ITA)	8:21.21
4.	Brian Diemer (USA)	8:21.32
5.	Fethi Baccouche (TUN)	8:22.75
6.	Bogusław Mamiński (POL)	8:24.32
7.	Tommy Ekblom (FIN)	8:24.66
8.	Ricardo Vera (URU)	8:36.80
9.	Colin Reitz (GBR)	8:40.55
10.	Shigeyuki Aikyo (JPN)	8:41.41
11.	Espen Borge (NOR)	8:47.34
12.	Ramón López (PAR)	9:10.29
—	Flemming Jensen (DEN)	DNF

RANK	HEAT 3	TIME
1.	Patriz Ilg (FRG)	8:18.73
2.	Graeme Fell (CAN)	8:18.87
3.	Peter Koech (KEN)	8:19.28
4.	José Regalo (POR)	8:20.70
5.	Henry Marsh (USA)	8:20.98
6.	Roger Hackney (GBR)	8:21.35
7.	Franco Boffi (ITA)	8:21.69
8.	Bruno Le Stum (FRA)	8:23.61
9.	Valeriy Vandyak (URS)	8:30.43
10.	Hans Koeleman (NED)	8:41.80
11.	Domingo Ramón (ESP)	8:46.23
—	Mirosław Żerkowski (POL)	DNF

== See also ==
- 1983 Men's World Championships 3.000m Steeplechase (Helsinki)
- 1984 Men's Olympic 3.000m Steeplechase (Los Angeles)
- 1986 Men's European Championships 3.000m Steeplechase (Stuttgart)
- 1988 Men's Olympic 3.000m Steeplechase (Seoul)
- 1990 Men's European Championships 3.000m Steeplechase (Split)
- 1991 Men's World Championships 3.000m Steeplechase (Tokyo)
