= Steeplechase at the World Athletics Championships =

3000 metres steeplechase at the World Athletics Championships
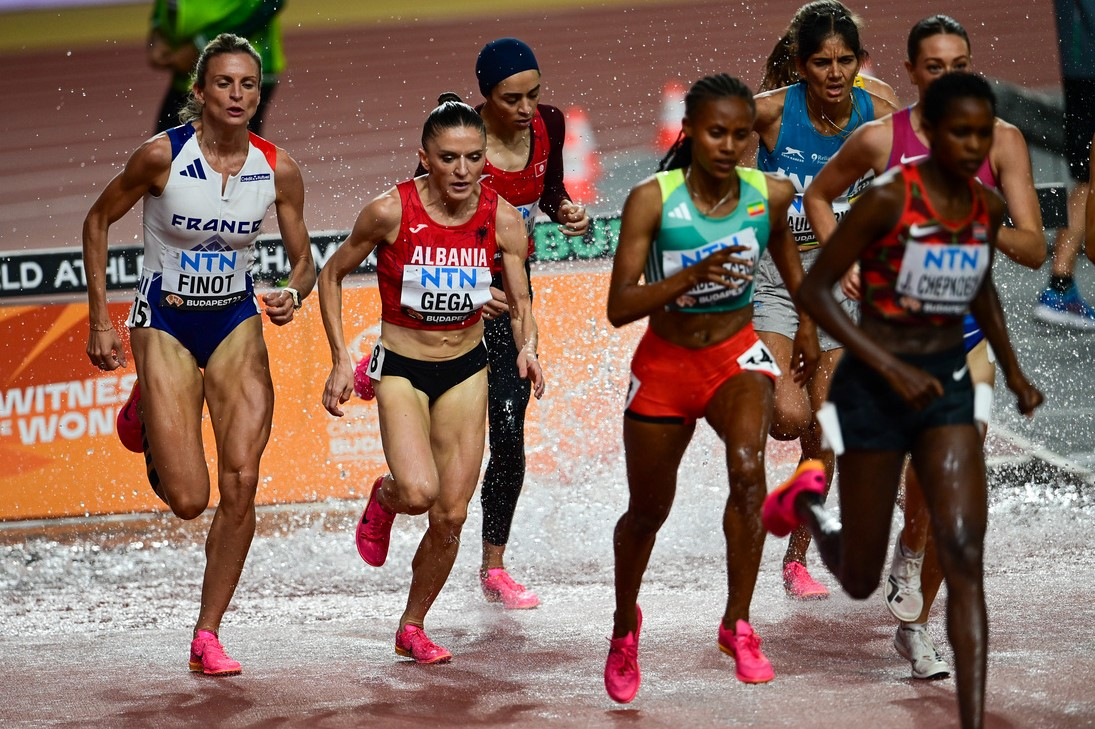
- The 2023 women's final underway

Overview
- Gender: Men and women
- Years held: Men: 1983 – 2025; Women: 2005 – 2025

Championship record
- Men: 8:00.43 Ezekiel Kemboi (2009)
- Women: 8:51.59 Norah Jeruto (2025)

Reigning champion
- Men: Geordie Beamish (NZL)
- Women: Faith Cherotich (KEN)

The 3000 metres steeplechase has been held as an event at the IAAF World Championships in Athletics in the men's division since 1983 and in the women's division since 2005. It can be noted for a series of lengthy winning streaks in the men's division, where Kenyan born athletes have won every championship between 1991 and 2019. Moses Kiptanui won three in a row between 1987 and 1995, Saif Saaeed Shaheen, born Steven Cherono, won two in 2003 and 2005. The longest winning streak in any event in the World Championships, is four in a row by Ezekiel Kemboi, between 2009 and 2015. More remarkably, Kemboi prefaced that streak with a streak of three silver medals between 2003 and 200. 2007 champion Brimin Kipruto has a complete set of medals, including two bronze. Kenya has also fared well in the women's division winning 9 of the 21 medals issued to date. 2013 women's champion Milcah Chemos Cheywa also has a complete set of medals.

The championship records for the event are 8:00.43 for men, set by Ezekiel Kemboi in 2009, and 8:53.02 for women, set by Norah Jeruto in 2022.

== Age records ==
All information from World Athletics.

Distinction	Male			Female		
Distinction	Athlete	Age	Date	Athlete	Age	Date
Youngest champion	Moses Kiptanui (KEN)	19 years, 334 days	31 Aug 1991	Yuliya Zarudneva (RUS)	23 years, 113 days	17 Aug 2009
Youngest medalist	Conseslus Kipruto (KEN)	18 years, 250 days	15 Aug 2013	Mekides Abebe (ETH)	20 years, 356 days	20 Jul 2022
Youngest finalist	Getnet Wale (ETH)	17 years, 23 days	8 Aug 2017	Winfred Yavi (BHR)	17 years, 223 days	11 Aug 2017
Youngest participant	Jakob Ingebrigtsen (NOR)	16 years, 321 days	6 Aug 2017	Zerfe Wondemagegn (ETH)	16 years, 336 days	27 Sep 2019
Oldest champion	Ezekiel Kemboi (KEN)	33 years, 91 days	24 Aug 2015	Yekaterina Volkova (RUS)	29 years, 192 days	27 Aug 2007
Oldest medalist	Ezekiel Kemboi (KEN)	33 years, 91 days	24 Aug 2015	Habiba Ghribi (TUN)	31 years, 139 days	26 Aug 2015
Oldest finalist	Simon Vroemen (NED)	36 years, 90 days	9 Aug 2005	Mardrea Hyman (JAM)	34 years, 248 days	27 Aug 2007
Oldest participant	Graeme Fell (CAN)	36 years, 143 days	9 Aug 1995	Minori Hayakari (JPN)	38 years, 271 days	27 Aug 2011

== Medalists ==
=== Men ===
Championships	Gold	Silver	Bronze
1983 Helsinki	Patriz Ilg (FRG)	Bogusław Mamiński (POL)	Colin Reitz (GBR)
1987 Rome	Francesco Panetta (ITA)	Hagen Melzer (GDR)	William Van Dijck (BEL)
1991 Tokyo	Moses Kiptanui (KEN)	Patrick Sang (KEN)	Azzedine Brahmi (ALG)
1993 Stuttgart	Moses Kiptanui (KEN)	Patrick Sang (KEN)	Alessandro Lambruschini (ITA)
1995 Gothenburg	Moses Kiptanui (KEN)	Christopher Kosgei (KEN)	Saad Al-Asmari (KSA)
1997 Athens	Wilson Boit Kipketer (KEN)	Moses Kiptanui (KEN)	Bernard Barmasai (KEN)
1999 Seville	Christopher Kosgei (KEN)	Wilson Boit Kipketer (KEN)	Ali Ezzine (MAR)
2001 Edmonton	Reuben Kosgei (KEN)	Ali Ezzine (MAR)	Bernard Barmasai (KEN)
2003 Saint-Denis	Saif Saaeed Shaheen (QAT)	Ezekiel Kemboi (KEN)	Eliseo Martín (ESP)
2005 Helsinki	Saif Saaeed Shaheen (QAT)	Ezekiel Kemboi (KEN)	Brimin Kipruto (KEN)
2007 Osaka	Brimin Kipruto (KEN)	Ezekiel Kemboi (KEN)	Richard Mateelong (KEN)
2009 Berlin	Ezekiel Kemboi (KEN)	Richard Mateelong (KEN)	Bouabdellah Tahri (FRA)
2011 Daegu	Ezekiel Kemboi (KEN)	Brimin Kipruto (KEN)	Mahiedine Mekhissi-Benabbad (FRA)
2013 Moscow	Ezekiel Kemboi (KEN)	Conseslus Kipruto (KEN)	Mahiedine Mekhissi-Benabbad (FRA)
2015 Beijing	Ezekiel Kemboi (KEN)	Conseslus Kipruto (KEN)	Brimin Kipruto (KEN)
2017 London	Conseslus Kipruto (KEN)	Soufiane El Bakkali (MAR)	Evan Jager (USA)
2019 Doha	Conseslus Kipruto (KEN)	Lamecha Girma (ETH)	Soufiane El Bakkali (MAR)
2022 Eugene	Soufiane El Bakkali (MAR)	Lamecha Girma (ETH)	Conseslus Kipruto (KEN)
2023 Budapest	Soufiane El Bakkali (MAR)	Lamecha Girma (ETH)	Abraham Kibiwott (KEN)
2025 Tokyo	Geordie Beamish (NZL)	Soufiane El Bakkali (MAR)	Edmund Serem (KEN)

==== Medal table ====
Rank	Nation	Gold	Silver	Bronze	Total
1	Kenya (KEN)	13	12	8	33
2	Morocco (MAR)	2	3	2	7
3	Qatar (QAT)	2	0	0	2
4	Italy (ITA)	1	0	1	2
5	Germany (GER)	1	0	0	1
5	New Zealand (NZL)	1	0	0	1
7	Ethiopia (ETH)	0	3	0	3
8	East Germany (GDR)	0	1	0	1
8	Poland (POL)	0	1	0	1
10	France (FRA)	0	0	3	3
11	Algeria (ALG)	0	0	1	1
11	Belgium (BEL)	0	0	1	1
11	Great Britain (GBR)	0	0	1	1
11	Saudi Arabia (KSA)	0	0	1	1
11	Spain (ESP)	0	0	1	1
11	United States (USA)	0	0	1	1
Totals (16 entries)		20	20	20	60

=== Multiple medalists ===
Rank	Athlete	Nation	Championships	Gold	Silver	Bronze	Total
1	Ezekiel Kemboi	Kenya (KEN)	2003–2015	4	3	0	7
2	Moses Kiptanui	Kenya (KEN)	1991–1997	3	1	0	4
3	Conseslus Kipruto	Kenya (KEN)	2013–2022	2	2	1	5
3	Soufiane El Bakkali	Morocco (MAR)	2017-2025	2	2	1	5
5	Saif Saaeed Shaheen	Qatar (QAT)	2003–2005	2	0	0	2
6	Brimin Kipruto	Kenya (KEN)	2005–2015	1	1	2	4
7	Christopher Kosgei	Kenya (KEN)	1995–1999	1	1	0	2
7	Wilson Boit Kipketer	Kenya (KEN)	1997-1999	1	1	0	2
9	Lamecha Girma	Ethiopia (ETH)	2019-2023	0	3	0	3
10	Patrick Sang	Kenya (KEN)	1991-1993	0	2	0	2
11	Ali Ezzine	Morocco (MAR)	1999-2001	0	1	1	2
11	Richard Mateelong	Kenya (KEN)	2007-2009	0	1	1	2
13	Mahiedine Mekhissi-Benabbad	France (FRA)	2011-2013	0	0	2	2

=== Women ===
Championships	Gold	Silver	Bronze
2005 Helsinki	Dorcus Inzikuru (UGA)	Yekaterina Volkova (RUS)	Jeruto Kiptum (KEN)
2007 Osaka	Yekaterina Volkova (RUS)	Tatyana Petrova (RUS)	Eunice Jepkorir (KEN)
2009 Berlin	Vacant	Yuliya Zarudneva (RUS)	Milcah Chemos Cheywa (KEN)
2011 Daegu	Habiba Ghribi (TUN)	Milcah Chemos Cheywa (KEN)	Mercy Wanjiku (KEN)
2013 Moscow	Milcah Chemos Cheywa (KEN)	Lydiah Chepkurui (KEN)	Sofia Assefa (ETH)
2015 Beijing	Hyvin Jepkemoi (KEN)	Habiba Ghribi (TUN)	Gesa Felicitas Krause (GER)
2017 London	Emma Coburn (USA)	Courtney Frerichs (USA)	Hyvin Jepkemoi (KEN)
2019 Doha	Beatrice Chepkoech (KEN)	Emma Coburn (USA)	Gesa Felicitas Krause (GER)
2022 Eugene	Norah Jeruto (KAZ)	Werkuha Getachew (ETH)	Mekides Abebe (ETH)
2023 Budapest	Winfred Yavi (BHR)	Beatrice Chepkoech (KEN)	Faith Cherotich (KEN)
2025 Tokyo	Faith Cherotich (KEN)	Winfred Yavi (BHR)	Sembo Almayew (ETH)

=== Medal table ===
Rank	Nation	Gold	Silver	Bronze	Total
1	Kenya (KEN)	4	3	6	11
2	Russia (RUS)	1	3	0	4
3	United States (USA)	1	2	0	3
4	Bahrain (BHR)	1	1	0	2
4	Tunisia (TUN)	1	1	0	2
6	Kazakhstan (KAZ)	1	0	0	1
6	Uganda (UGA)	1	0	0	1
6	Ethiopia (ETH)	0	1	2	3
7	Germany (GER)	0	0	2	2

=== Multiple medalists ===
Rank	Athlete	Nation	Championships	Gold	Silver	Bronze	Total
1	Milcah Chemos Cheywa	Kenya (KEN)	2009–2013	1	1	1	3
2	Yekaterina Volkova	Russia (RUS)	2005-2007	1	1	0	2
2	Habiba Ghribi	Tunisia (TUN)	2011-2015	1	1	0	2
2	Emma Coburn	United States (USA)	2017-2019	1	1	0	2
2	Beatrice Chepkoech	Kenya (KEN)	2019-2023	1	1	0	2
2	Winfred Yavi	Bahrain (BHR)	2023-2025	1	1	0	2
5	Hyvin Jepkemoi	Kenya (KEN)	2015-2017	1	0	1	2
5	Faith Cherotich	Kenya (KEN)	2023-2025	1	0	1	2
6	Gesa Felicitas Krause	Germany (GER)	2015–2019	0	0	2	2

== Championship record progression ==
=== Men ===
Men's 3000 metres steeplechase World Championships record progression
Time	Athlete	Nation	Year	Round	Date
8.26.63	Julius Korir	Kenya (KEN)	1983	Heats	1983-08-09
8.22.78	Colin Reitz	Great Britain (GBR)	1983	Heats	1983-08-09
8.20.81	Boguslaw Maminski	Poland (POL)	1983	Semi-finals	1983-08-10
8.15.06	Patriz Ilg	West Germany (FRG)	1983	Final	1983-08-12
8.08.57	Francesco Panetta	Italy (ITA)	1987	Final	1987-09-05
8.06.36	Moses Kiptanui	Kenya (KEN)	1993	Final	1987-08-21
8.04.16	Moses Kiptanui	Kenya (KEN)	1995	Final	1993-08-11
8.00.43	Ezekiel Kemboi	Kenya (KEN)	2009	Final	2009-08-18

=== Women ===
Women's 3000 metres steeplechase World Championships record progression
Time	Athlete	Nation	Year	Round	Date
9.32.96	Yelena Zadorozhnaya	Russia (RUS)	2005	Heats	2005-08-06
9.27.85	Dorcus Inzikuru	Uganda (UGA)	2005	Heats	2005-08-06
9.18.24	Dorcus Inzikuru	Uganda (UGA)	2005	Final	2005-08-08
9.06.57	Yekaterina Volkova	Russia (RUS)	2007	Final	2007-08-27
9:02.58	Emma Coburn	United States (USA)	2017	Final	2017-08-11
8.57.84	Beatrice Chepkoech	Kenya (KEN)	2019	Final	2019-09-30
8:53.02	Norah Jeruto	Kazakhstan (KAZ)	2022	Final	2022-07-20
8:51.59	Faith Cherotich	Kenya (KEN)	2025	Final	2025-09-17

== Finishing times ==
=== Top ten fastest World Championship times ===
Fastest men's times at the World Championships
Rank	Time (sec)	Athlete	Nation	Year	Date
1	8:00.43	Ezekiel Kemboi	Kenya	2009	2009-08-18
2	8:00.89	Richard Kipkemboi Mateelong	Kenya	2009	2009-08-18
3	8:01.18	Bouabdellah Tahri	France	2009	2009-08-18
4	8:01.26	Paul Kipsiele Koech	Kenya	2009	2009-08-18
5	8:01.35	Conseslus Kipruto	Kenya	2019	2019-10-04
6	8:01.36	Lamecha Girma	Ethiopia	2019	2019-10-04
7	8:03.53	Soufiane El Bakkali	Morocco	2023	2023-08-27
8	8:03.76	Soufiane El Bakkali	Morocco	2019	2019-10-04
9	8:04.16	Moses Kiptanui	Kenya	1995	1995-08-11
10	8:02.39	Saif Saaeed Shaheen	Qatar	2003	2003-08-26

Fastest women's times at the World Championships
Rank	Time (sec)	Athlete	Nation	Year	Date
1	8:51.59	Faith Cherotich	Kenya	2025	2025-09-17
2	8:53.02	Norah Jeruto	Kazakhstan	2022	2022-07-20
3	8:54.29	Winfred Yavi	Bahrain	2023	2023-08-27
4	8:54.61	Werkuha Getachew	Ethiopia	2022	2022-07-20
5	8:56.08	Mekides Abebe	Ethiopia	2022	2022-07-20
6	8:56.46	Winfred Yavi	Bahrain	2025	2025-09-17
7	8:57.84	Beatrice Chepkoech	Kenya	2019	2019-09-30
8	8:58.86	Sembo Almayew	Ethiopia	2025	2025-09-17
9	8:58.98	Beatrice Chepkoech	Kenya	2023	2023-08-27
10	9:00.69	Faith Cherotich	Kenya	2023	2023-08-27

== See also ==
- 3000 metres steeplechase
- 3000 metres steeplechase at the Olympics
