= 1983 World Championships in Athletics – Men's 3000 metres steeplechase =

These are the official results of the Men's 3.000 metres Steeplechase event at the inaugural 1983 IAAF World Championships in Helsinki, Finland. There were a total of 35 participating athletes, with three qualifying heats and the final held on 12 August 1983.

== Medalists ==
Gold	Patriz Ilg; West Germany (FRG)
Silver	Bogusław Mamiński; Poland (POL)
Bronze	(United Kingdom) Colin Reitz; Great Britain (GBR)

== Summary ==
On a cold and rainy day, Tommy Ekblom sprinted off the line to take the early lead. Half a lap into the race he was almost 10 metres off the front absorbing the enthusiasm of the home crowd as the pack strung out behind him. Over the next two laps, Colin Reitz led the pack to pull back the lead as Ekblom's pace slowed on the second lap. Reitz was comfortable to wait on Ekblom's shoulder. Henry Marsh typically was off the back of the string, at times over 5 metres behind the last athlete. Ekblom continued to lead, the pack bunching up behind him with Marsh joining on the fifth lap but nobody moving past. Finally with a lap and a half to go, Mariano Scartezzini dared to go past, accelerating to take a couple of metres until Bogusław Mamiński went off in chase going into the bell, then the racing began. Wiggling through Reitz and Mamiński on the inside, Patriz Ilg pulled up to the challenging position with Marsh coming around the outside to join him. Before the final back stretch, Ilg went by and separated off the front. Mamiński squeezed inside of Marsh to take off in chase, only Marsh and Reitz still in contact. Picking up speed, Marsh passed Mamiński, then moving toward the outside he had room to pass Ilg on the outside going into the last barrier. Then Marsh hit the barrier. It didn't go down. Marsh did. Ilg was gone to victory. As Marsh tried to find his way to his feet, Mamiński, Reitz and Joseph Mahmoud went by to finish in that order.

== Records ==
Existing records at the start of the event.

World Record	Henry Rono (KEN)	8:05.4	Seattle, USA	May 13, 1978
Championship Record	New event			

== Final ==
RANK	FINAL	TIME
	Patriz Ilg (FRG)	8:15.06
	Bogusław Mamiński (POL)	8:17.03
	Colin Reitz (GBR)	8:17.75
4.	Joseph Mahmoud (FRA)	8:18.32
5.	Roger Hackney (GBR)	8:19.38
6.	Graeme Fell (GBR)	8:20.01
7.	Julius Korir (KEN)	8:20.11
8.	Henry Marsh (USA)	8:20.45
9.	Mariano Scartezzini (ITA)	8:21.17
10.	Domingo Ramón (ESP)	8:21.32
11.	Hagen Melzer (GDR)	8:21.33
12.	Tommy Ekblom (FIN)	8:21.50

== Semi finals ==
- Held on Wednesday 1983-08-10

RANK	HEAT 1	TIME
1.	Colin Reitz (GBR)	8:22.91
2.	Hagen Melzer (GDR)	8:23.10
3.	Henry Marsh (USA)	8:23.18
4.	Tommy Ekblom (FIN)	8:23.28
5.	Mariano Scartezzini (ITA)	8:23.30
6.	Francisco Sánchez (ESP)	8:23.92
7.	Panayot Kashanov (BUL)	8:31.95
8.	Richard Tuwei (KEN)	8:33.29
9.	Pascal Debacker (FRA)	8:36.16
10.	William Van Dijck (BEL)	8:39.01
11.	Rainer Schwarz (FRG)	DNF
—	Krzysztof Wesołowski (POL)	DNS

RANK	HEAT 2	TIME
1.	Bogusław Mamiński (POL)	8:20.81
2.	Patriz Ilg (FRG)	8:20.83
3.	Julius Korir (KEN)	8:21.07
4.	Joseph Mahmoud (FRA)	8:21.29
5.	Domingo Ramón (ESP)	8:21.61
6.	Roger Hackney (GBR)	8:22.44
7.	Graeme Fell (GBR)	8:23.22
8.	Brian Diemer (USA)	8:23.39
9.	Peter Renner (NZL)	8:25.72
10.	Gábor Markó (HUN)	8:32.42
11.	Shigeyuki Aikyo (JPN)	8:33.29
12.	Kip Rono (KEN)	8:33.97

== Qualifying heats ==
- Held on Tuesday 1983-08-09

RANK	HEAT 1	TIME
1.	Julius Korir (KEN)	8:26.63
2.	Domingo Ramón (ESP)	8:27.19
3.	Henry Marsh (USA)	8:27.46
4.	Rainer Schwarz (FRG)	8:27.71
4.	Graeme Fell (GBR)	8:27.71
6.	Gábor Markó (HUN)	8:27.72
7.	Mariano Scartezzini (ITA)	8:28.27
8.	Joseph Mahmoud (FRA)	8:29.34
9.	Shigeyuki Aikyo (JPN)	8:31.27
10.	Peter Daenens (BEL)	8:39.66
11.	Ilkka Äyräväinen (FIN)	8:46.23
12.	Flemming Jensen (DEN)	8:56.57

RANK	HEAT 2	TIME
1.	Krzysztof Wesołowski (POL)	8:27.08
2.	Panayot Kashanov (BUL)	8:29.15
3.	Kip Rono (KEN)	8:29.25
4.	Tommy Ekblom (FIN)	8:30.74
5.	Roger Hackney (GBR)	8:30.90
6.	William Van Dijck (BEL)	8:32.33
7.	Rickey Pittman (USA)	8:32.62
8.	Brendan Quinn (IRL)	8:34.02
9.	Hamid Homada (MAR)	8:34.59
10.	Juan Torres (ESP)	8:41.87
11.	Mark Adam (CAN)	9:15.18
12.	Girma Woldehana (ETH)	9:31.81

RANK	HEAT 3	TIME
1.	Colin Reitz (GBR)	8:22.78
2.	Bogusław Mamiński (POL)	8:22.79
3.	Patriz Ilg (FRG)	8:22.97
4.	Richard Tuwei (KEN)	8:23.88
5.	Hagen Melzer (GDR)	8:24.23
6.	Brian Diemer (USA)	8:24.92
7.	Peter Renner (NZL)	8:25.66
8.	Francisco Sánchez (ESP)	8:25.92
9.	Pascal Debacker (FRA)	8:30.79
10.	Carmelo Ríos (PUR)	8:47.19
11.	Eshetu Tura (ETH)	8:53.86

== See also ==
- 1980 Men's Olympic 3.000m Steeplechase (Moscow)
- 1982 Men's European Championships 3.000m Steeplechase (Athens)
- 1984 Men's Olympic 3.000m Steeplechase (Los Angeles)
- 1986 Men's European Championships 3.000m Steeplechase (Stuttgart)
- 1987 Men's World Championships 3.000m Steeplechase (Rome)
