= 1986 European Athletics Championships – Men's 3000 metres steeplechase =

Athletic Championship in Europe

Men's 3000 metres steeplechase at the European Athletics Championships

These are the official results of the Men's 3,000 metres steeplechase event at the 1986 European Championships in Stuttgart, West Germany, held at Neckarstadion on 27 and 29 August 1986.

== Medalists ==
Gold	Hagen Melzer; East Germany
Silver	Francesco Panetta; Italy
Bronze	Patriz Ilg; West Germany

== Final ==
Rank	Final	Time
	Hagen Melzer (GDR)	8:16.65
	Francesco Panetta (ITA)	8:16.85
	Patriz Ilg (FRG)	8:16.92
4.	Colin Reitz (GBR)	8:18.12
5.	William Van Dijck (BEL)	8:20.19
6.	Joseph Mahmoud (FRA)	8:20.25
7.	Rainer Schwarz (FRG)	8:20.90
8.	Roger Hackney (GBR)	8:20.97
9.	José Regalo (POR)	8:21.41
10.	Tommy Ekblom (FIN)	8:28.32
11.	Pascal Debacker (FRA)	8:34.95
12.	Henryk Jankowski (POL)	8:36.55
13.	Gábor Markó (HUN)	8:38.78
—	Mykola Matyushenko (URS)	DNF
—	Bogusław Mamiński (POL)	DNF

== Qualifying heats ==
Rank	Heat 1	Time
1.	Tommy Ekblom (FIN)	8:24.03
2.	Hagen Melzer (GDR)	8:24.07
3.	Roger Hackney (GBR)	8:24.49
4.	Gábor Markó (HUN)	8:24.51
5.	Rainer Schwarz (FRG)	8:25.02
6.	Pascal Debacker (FRA)	8:25.22
7.	Francesco Panetta (ITA)	8:25.44
8.	Henryk Jankowski (POL)	8:26.51
9.	Francisco Sánchez (ESP)	8:29.20
10.	Are Nakkim (NOR)	8:42.95
11.	Wolfgang Konrad (AUT)	8:54.33
	Brendan Quinn (IRL)	DNF

Rank	Heat 2	Time
1.	William Van Dijck (BEL)	8:26.52
2.	Colin Reitz (GBR)	8:26.26
3.	Bogusław Mamiński (POL)	8:27.11
4.	Patriz Ilg (FRG)	8:27.14
5.	Joseph Mahmoud (FRA)	8:27.47
6.	José Regalo (POR)	8:27.65
7.	Nikolay Matyushenko (URS)	8:27.98
8.	Raymond Pannier (FRA)	8:28.73
9.	Roland Hertner (SUI)	8:36.46
10.	Jorge Bello (ESP)	8:38.13
11.	Roger Gjøvåg (NOR)	8:39.62
12.	Alessandro Lambruschini (ITA)	8:49.90

== Participation ==
According to an unofficial count, 24 athletes from 16 countries participated in the event.

- Austria (1)
- Belgium (1)
- East Germany (1)
- Finland (1)
- France (3)
- Hungary (1)
- Ireland (1)
- Italy (2)
- Norway (2)
- Poland (2)
- Portugal (1)
- Soviet Union (1)
- Spain (2)
- Switzerland (1)
- United Kingdom (2)
- West Germany (2)

== See also ==
- 1982 Men's European Championships 3,000m Steeplechase (Athens)
- 1983 Men's World Championships 3,000m Steeplechase (Helsinki)
- 1984 Men's Olympic 3,000m Steeplechase (Los Angeles)
- 1987 Men's World Championships 3,000m Steeplechase (Rome)
- 1988 Men's Olympic 3,000m Steeplechase (Seoul)
- 1990 Men's European Championships 3,000m Steeplechase (Split)
