= Eddie Wedderburn =

English distance runner (born 1960)

Personal information
- Nationality: British (English)
- Born: 6 December 1960 (age 65) West Bromwich, West Midlands, England
- Height: 181 cm (5 ft 11 in)
- Weight: 64 kg (141 lb)

Sport
- Sport: Athletics
- Event: 3,000m steeplechase
- Club: Tipton Harriers
Medal record
Representing Great Britain
Summer Universiade
Silver medal – second place	1985 Kobe	3000m steeplechase

Edison Everton Wedderburn (born 6 December 1960) is a male English former distance runner who competed mainly in the 3000 metres steeplechase. He represented Great Britain at the 1988 Olympic Games and won a silver medal at the 1985 Summer Universiade.

== Biography ==
Wedderburn competed for the Murray State Racers track and field team in the NCAA.

Wedderburn finished second in the 3000m steeplechase at the 1982 UK Athletics Championships behind Roger Hackney, and second at the 1983 AAA Championships behind Colin Reitz. In 1985, he won a silver medal at the World Student Games (Universiade) behind Italy's Franco Boffi.

Weddurbun was twice the British 3000 metres steeplechase champion after winning the British AAA Championships titles at the 1986 AAA Championships and the 1987 AAA Championships.

Wedderburn competed at the 1987 World Championships in Rome, where the top four in each heat were assured of qualifying for the final. He was fifth in heat one, running 8:24.09 (19th overall). Wedderburn achieved his lifetime best in the 3000m steeplechase on 5 July 1988 at the DN Galan in Stockholm, running 8:18.32. As of 2016, this time ranks him fifth on the British all-time list behind Mark Rowland, Colin Reitz, Tom Hanlon and Graeme Fell. In September 1988, after qualifying from his heat with 8:38.90, he ran 8:28.62 to finish 10th in his semifinal at the Seoul Olympics (18th overall).

He represented England, at the 1986 Commonwealth Games in Edinburgh, Scotland and represented England, at the 1990 Commonwealth Games in Auckland, New Zealand.

== International competitions ==
Year	Competition	Venue	Position	Notes
Representing Great Britain / England
1985	Summer Universiade	Kobe, Japan	2nd	8:28.90
1986	Commonwealth Games	Edinburgh, United Kingdom	8th	8:46.42
1987	World Championships	Rome, Italy	18th (h)	8:24.09
1988	Olympic Games	Seoul, South Korea	19th (sf)	8:28.62
1990	Commonwealth Games	Auckland, New Zealand	6th	8:34.66
