= Athletics at the 1984 Summer Olympics – Men's 3000 metres steeplechase =

Men's 3000 metres steeplechase at the Games of the XXIII Olympiad
- Olympic Athletics
- Venue: Los Angeles Memorial Coliseum
- Dates: 6 August 1984 (round one); 8 August 1984 (semi-finals); 10 August 1984 (final)
- Competitors: 35 from 25 nations

Medalists
1st place, gold medalist(s)		Julius Korir	Kenya
2nd place, silver medalist(s)		Joseph Mahmoud	France
3rd place, bronze medalist(s)		Brian Diemer	United States

The men's 3000 metres steeplechase at the 1984 Summer Olympics in Los Angeles, California had an entry list of 35 competitors, with three qualifying heats (35 runners) and two semifinals (24) before the final (12) took place.

== Summary ==
During the first lap of the race, a bandit rushed the track, joining the race over the first water jump. He managed to sprint past security over the next barrier and beyond before being tackled. On the second lap, he managed to get free again for a few moments before finally being dragged away.

"They've got all sorts of security at these games, designed to prevent anything from nuclear attack to germ warfare. But the odd idiot is a real problem."

— David Coleman, BBC Commentator

Shortly after the second lap began, Peter Renner assumed the lead, followed by Kenyan Julius duo of Julius Korir and Julius Kariuki. Henry Marsh was typically as much as 20 metres back off the pace. Renner opened up several metres on the Kenyans but with two laps to go, the field began bunching behind Renner with Brian Diemer, Joseph Mahmoud, Colin Reitz and Marsh back in the fold, all getting ready to pounce. Just before the bell, Renner started to fall back. Korir accelerated and Marsh was the first to follow, Diemer was next to catch up, followed by Mahmoud. Through the final turn, Marsh looked like the only one still with any shot at Korir, but he was still losing ground. Marsh was unable to make any headway as Mahmoud passed in on the outside, with Korir taking the final barrier as a hurdler and sprinting to victory. Mahmoud sprinted away to the silver medal while Diemer challenged Marsh on the outside. Diemer got the edge on Marsh with 10 metres to go, with the beaten Marsh just striding the final few steps over the line.

== Records ==
Prior to this competition, the existing world, and Olympic records were as follows.

World record	Henry Rono (KEN)	8:05.4	Seattle, United States	13 May 1978
Olympic record	Anders Gärderud (SWE)	8:08.02	Montreal, Canada	28 July 1976

== Schedule ==
The men's 3000 metres steeplechase took place over three separate days.

All times are Pacific Daylight Time (UTC-7)

Date	Time	Round
Monday, 6 August 1984	18:25	Round One
Wednesday, 8 August 1984	20:00	Semi-finals
Friday, 10 August 1984	19:10	Final

== Results ==
=== Heats ===
Note: Top six in each heat (Q) and the next six fastest (q) advanced to the semi-finals.

==== Heat 1 ====
Rank	Athlete	Nationality	Time	Notes
1	Brian Diemer	United States	8:25.92	Q
2	Domingo Ramón	Spain	8:26.04	Q
3	Féthi Baccouche	Tunisia	8:27.49	Q
4	William Van Dijck	Belgium	8:29.68	Q
5	Emilio Ulloa	Chile	8:29.71	Q
6	Pascal Debacker	France	8:30.35	Q
7	Paul Davies-Hale	Great Britain	8:31.97	q
8	Francesco Panetta	Italy	8:37.05	q
9	Kip Rono	Kenya	8:41.75	
10	Pedro Cáceres	Argentina	8:50.02	
11	Emmanuel M'Pioh	Republic of the Congo	9:05.58	NR
12	Abdullah Azzan Al-Akbary	Oman	10:22.56	

==== Heat 2 ====
Rank	Athlete	Nationality	Time	Notes
1	Julius Korir	Kenya	8:29.08	Q
2	Roger Hackney	Great Britain	8:30.31	Q
3	Joseph Mahmoud	France	8:30.85	Q
4	Hans Koeleman	Netherlands	8:31.34	Q
5	Greg Duhaime	Canada	8:31.54	Q
6	Carmelo Ríos	Puerto Rico	8:31.88	Q
7	Franco Boffi	Italy	8:32.26	q
8	John Gregorek	United States	8:38.43	q
9	Juan José Torres	Spain	8:40.76	
10	Hector Begeo	Philippines	8:53.70	
11	Hugo Allan García	Guatemala	9:02.41	
12	Ramón López	Paraguay	9:36.36	

==== Heat 3 ====
Rank	Athlete	Nationality	Time	Notes
1	Julius Kariuki	Kenya	8:19.45	Q
2	Peter Renner	New Zealand	8:22.95	Q
3	Peter Daenens	Belgium	8:28.26	Q
4	Henry Marsh	United States	8:29.23	Q
5	Colin Reitz	Great Britain	8:29.33	Q
6	Tommy Ekblom	Finland	8:29.45	Q
7	Filippos Filippou	Cyprus	8:30.09	q
8	Liam O'Brien	Ireland	8:31.89	q
9	Yehuda Zadok	Israel	8:42.28	
10	Kim Ju-ryong	South Korea	8:43.50	
11	Albert Marie	Seychelles	9:32.30	
—	Filbert Bayi	Tanzania	—	DNS

=== Semi-finals ===
Note: Top five in each heat (Q) and the next two fastest (q) advanced to the final.

==== Semi-final 1 ====
Rank	Athlete	Nationality	Time	Notes
1	Domingo Ramón	Spain	8:19.08	Q
2	Pascal Debacker	France	8:20.34	Q
3	Tommy Ekblom	Finland	8:20.54	Q
4	Henry Marsh	United States	8:20.57	Q
5	Roger Hackney	Great Britain	8:20.77	Q
6	Julius Kariuki	Kenya	8:21.07	q
7	William Van Dijck	Belgium	8:23.08	
8	Paul Davies-Hale	Great Britain	8:26.15	
9	Greg Duhaime	Canada	8:26.32	
10	Franco Boffi	Italy	8:30.82	
11	Liam O'Brien	Ireland	8:34.90	
12	Filippos Filippou	Cyprus	8:39.47	

==== Semi-final 2 ====
Rank	Athlete	Nationality	Time	Notes
1	Julius Korir	Kenya	8:17.40	Q
2	Peter Renner	New Zealand	8:18.12	Q
3	Brian Diemer	United States	8:18.36	Q
4	Colin Reitz	Great Britain	8:18.62	Q
5	Joseph Mahmoud	France	8:18.62	Q
6	Féthi Baccouche	Tunisia	8:18.70	q
7	Peter Daenens	Belgium	8:21.77	
8	Emilio Ulloa	Chile	8:28.99	
9	Francesco Panetta	Italy	8:31.24	
10	Hans Koeleman	Netherlands	8:32.29	
11	John Gregorek	United States	8:38.19	
12	Carmelo Ríos	Puerto Rico	8:44.70	

=== Final ===
Rank	Athlete	Nationality	Time	Notes
1st place, gold medalist(s)	Julius Korir	Kenya	8:11.80	
2nd place, silver medalist(s)	Joseph Mahmoud	France	8:13.31	
3rd place, bronze medalist(s)	Brian Diemer	United States	8:14.06	
4	Henry Marsh	United States	8:14.25	
5	Colin Reitz	Great Britain	8:15.48	
6	Domingo Ramón	Spain	8:17.27	
7	Julius Kariuki	Kenya	8:17.47	
8	Pascal Debacker	France	8:21.51	
9	Tommy Ekblom	Finland	8:23.95	
10	Roger Hackney	Great Britain	8:27.10	
11	Peter Renner	New Zealand	8:29.81	
12	Féthi Baccouche	Tunisia	8:43.40	
