= Athletics at the 1986 Commonwealth Games – Men's 3000 metres steeplechase =

Men's 3000 metres steeplechase at the Commonwealth Games

The men's 3000 metres steeplechase event at the 1986 Commonwealth Games was held on 27 July at the Meadowbank Stadium in Edinburgh.

== Results ==
| Rank | Name | Nationality | Time | Notes |
|---|---|---|---|---|
| 1st place, gold medalist(s) | Graeme Fell | Canada | 8:24.49 | |
| 2nd place, silver medalist(s) | Roger Hackney | Wales | 8:25.15 | |
| 3rd place, bronze medalist(s) | Colin Reitz | England | 8:26.14 | |
| 4 | Peter Renner | New Zealand | 8:27.12 | |
| 5 | Nick Peach | England | 8:37.64 | |
| 6 | Mike Gilchrist | New Zealand | 8:43.96 | |
| 7 | Peter McColgan | Northern Ireland | 8:45.51 | |
| 8 | Eddie Wedderburn | England | 8:46.42 | |
| 9 | Phil Laheurte | Canada | 8:52.53 | |
| 10 | Tom Hanlon | Scotland | 8:53.56 | |
| 11 | Colin Hume | Scotland | 9:05.40 | |
| 12 | Richard Charleston | Scotland | 9:21.73 | |
| 13 | Bob Rice | Canada | 9:25.84 | |
