= Athletics at the 1990 Commonwealth Games – Men's 5000 metres =

Men's 5000 metres at the Commonwealth Games

The men's 5000 metres event at the 1990 Commonwealth Games was held on 29 January and 1 February at the Mount Smart Stadium in Auckland.

== Medalists ==
Gold	Silver	Bronze
Andy Lloyd; Australia	John Ngugi; Kenya	Ian Hamer; Wales

== Results ==
=== Heats ===
Qualification: First 6 of each heat (Q) and the next 3 fastest (q) qualified for the final.

Rank	Heat	Name	Nationality	Time	Notes
1	1	Paul Williams	Canada	13:50.74	Q
2	1	Yobes Ondieki	Kenya	13:51.67	Q
3	1	Jack Buckner	England	13:52.56	Q
4	2	John Ngugi	Kenya	13:52.37	Q
5	2	Eamonn Martin	England	13:52.50	Q
6	2	Ian Hamer	Wales	13:52.58	Q
7	2	Andy Lloyd	Australia	13:52.63	Q
8	2	Malcolm Norwood	Australia	13:53.39	Q
9	1	Mark Rowland	England	13:54.04	Q
10	2	Moses Tanui	Kenya	13:54.44	Q
11	1	Kerry Rodger	New Zealand	13:54.50	Q
12	1	Patrick Carroll	Australia	13:56.78	Q
13	1	Paul McCloy	Canada	13:58.24	q
14	1	Roger Hackney	Wales	13:58.89	q
15	2	Charles Mulinga	Zambia	14:00.58	q
16	2	Phil Clode	New Zealand	14:01.96	
17	1	Wilson Theleso	Botswana	14:03.38	
18	2	Graeme Fell	Canada	14:04.42	
19	2	Isaac Simelane	Swaziland	14:04.78	
20	1	Richard Potts	New Zealand	14:33.22	
21	2	George Mambosasa	Malawi	14:51.58	
22	2	Moneri Lebesa	Lesotho	15:18.40	
23	1	Aaron Dupnai	Papua New Guinea	15:53.63	
	1	Try Chinhoyi	Zimbabwe	DNS	

=== Final ===
Rank	Name	Nationality	Time	Notes
1st place, gold medalist(s)	Andy Lloyd	Australia	13:24.86	
2nd place, silver medalist(s)	John Ngugi	Kenya	13:24.94	
3rd place, bronze medalist(s)	Ian Hamer	Wales	13:25.63	
4	Kerry Rodger	New Zealand	13:26.79	
5	Moses Tanui	Kenya	13:28.31	
6	Paul Williams	Canada	13:33.68	
7	Mark Rowland	England	13:35.69	
8	Patrick Carroll	Australia	13:48.16	
9	Yobes Ondieki	Kenya	13:58.75	
10	Paul McCloy	Canada	14:00.26	
11	Charles Mulinga	Zambia	14:03.59	
12	Jack Buckner	England	14:10.59	
13	Malcolm Norwood	Australia	14:19.33	
14	Roger Hackney	Wales	14:27.06	
	Eamonn Martin	England	DNS	
