= Athletics at the 1988 Summer Olympics – Men's 3000 metres steeplechase =

Men's 3000 metres steeplechase at the Games of the XXIV Olympiad
- Venue: Olympic Stadium
- Date: 26 September 1988 (heats); 28 September 1988 (semi-finals); 30 September 1988 (final)
- Competitors: 32 from 24 nations
- Winning time: 8:05.51 OR

Medalists
1st place, gold medalist(s)		Julius Kariuki; Kenya
2nd place, silver medalist(s)		Peter Koech; Kenya
3rd place, bronze medalist(s)		Mark Rowland; Great Britain

The men's 3000 metres steeplechase at the 1988 Summer Olympics in Seoul, South Korea, had an entry list of 33 competitors, with three qualifying heats (33 runners) and two semifinals (26) before the final (13) took place on Friday September 30, 1988.

From the gun Francesco Panetta went out hard, at world record pace the first few laps. He was marked, a few metres back, by William Van Dijck with the rest of the field strung out behind. With about three laps to go, Kenyans Julius Kariuki and Peter Koech seemed to jog casually into position next to Van Dijck with Mark Rowland gamely holding on. From behind Alessandro Lambruschini and Patrick Sang rushed to catch up. With two laps to go, the Kenyan duo broke it open, with Panetta disappearing back into the field. Rowland was the only one to hang on to the Kenyans, who were looking around for the other challengers. With the three-man break clear and one lap to go, Kariuki departed from the team tactics and took off, opening up a 10-metre lead around the penultimate turn with Koech chasing. Kariuki took the water jump carefully; behind him, Koech hurdled the water pit and emphasized his separation on Rowland. Koech was able to make a little ground on Kariuki, but it was too little too late. Rowland had 20 metres on Lambruschini for bronze and a new British record. After the race, Rowland said "I just kept telling myself to dig, dig, dig—and I did it! I've got a bloody medal!"

== Medalists ==
Gold	Julius Kariuki; Kenya
Silver	Peter Koech; Kenya
Bronze	Mark Rowland; Great Britain

== Records ==
These were the standing World and Olympic records (in minutes) prior to the 1988 Summer Olympics.

World record	8:05.40	(Kenya) Henry Rono	Seattle (USA)	May 13, 1978
Olympic record	8:08.02	(Sweden) Anders Gärderud	Montreal (CAN)	July 28, 1976

The following Olympic record (in minutes) was set during this competition.

Date	Event	Athlete	Time	OR	WR
September 30, 1988	Final	Julius Kariuki (KEN)	8:05.51	OR	

== Final ==
RANK	FINAL	TIME
	Julius Kariuki (KEN)	8:05.51(OR)
	Peter Koech (KEN)	8:06.79
	Mark Rowland (GBR)	8:07.96
4.	Alessandro Lambruschini (ITA)	8:12.17
5.	William Van Dijck (BEL)	8:13.99
6.	Henry Marsh (USA)	8:14.39
7.	Patrick Sang (KEN)	8:15.22
8.	Bogusław Mamiński (POL)	8:15.97
9.	Francesco Panetta (ITA)	8:17.79
10.	Hagen Melzer (GDR)	8:19.82
11.	Graeme Fell (CAN)	8:21.73
12.	Raymond Pannier (FRA)	8:23.80
13.	Azzeddine Brahmi (ALG)	8:26.68

== Semi-finals ==
RANK	HEAT 1	TIME
1.	William Van Dijck (BEL)	8:15.63
2.	Peter Koech (KEN)	8:15.68
3.	Hagen Melzer (GDR)	8:16.27
4.	Patrick Sang (KEN)	8:16.70
5.	Francesco Panetta (ITA)	8:17.23
6.	Bogusław Mamiński (POL)	8:18.28
7.	Henry Marsh (USA)	8:18.94
8.	Hans Koeleman (NED)	8:21.86
9.	Bruno Le Stum (FRA)	8:26.69
10.	Eddie Wedderburn (GBR)	8:28.62
11.	Adauto Domingues (BRA)	8:35.05
12.	Hector Begeo (PHI)	8:35.09 (NR)
–	Roger Hackney (GBR)	DNF

RANK	HEAT 2	TIME
1.	Azzeddine Brahmi (ALG)	8:16.54
2.	Alessandro Lambruschini (ITA)	8:16.92
3.	Mark Rowland (GBR)	8:18.31
4.	Julius Kariuki (KEN)	8:18.53
5.	Raymond Pannier (FRA)	8:19.39
6.	Graeme Fell (CAN)	8:19.99
7.	Brian Diemer (USA)	8:23.89
8.	Jens Volkmann (FRG)	8:25.19
9.	Brian Abshire (USA)	8:27.78
10.	Fathi Baccouche (TUN)	8:31.36
11.	Brendan Quinn (IRL)	8:43.34
12.	Mohammed al-Dosari (KSA)	8:44.22
13.	Ramón Lopez (PAR)	8:52.62 (NR)

== Qualifying heats ==
RANK	HEAT 1	TIME
1.	Raymond Pannier (FRA)	8:30.94
2.	Mark Rowland (GBR)	8:31.40
3.	Peter Koech (KEN)	8:31.66
4.	Alessandro Lambruschini (ITA)	8:32.59
5.	Adauto Domingues (BRA)	8:32.77
6.	Henry Marsh (USA)	8:33.89
7.	Hans Koeleman (NED)	8:35.20
8.	Hector Begeo (PHI)	8:46.60
9.	Ramón Lopez (PAR)	8:56.06
10.	Davendra Singh (FIJ)	9:23.50
—	Abdelaziz Sahere (MAR)	DSQ

RANK	HEAT 2	TIME
1.	Francesco Panetta (ITA)	8:29.75
2.	Julius Kariuki (KEN)	8:33.42
3.	Azzeddine Brahmi (ALG)	8:35.59
4.	Brian Diemer (USA)	8:38.40
5.	Eddie Wedderburn (GBR)	8:38.90
6.	Bogusław Mamiński (POL)	8:45.72
7.	Graeme Fell (CAN)	8:51.25
8.	Cha Han-sik (KOR)	8:59.82
9.	Ikaji Salom (TAN)	9:10.36
—	Emilio Ulloa (CHI)	DNF
—	Béla Vágó (HUN)	DNS

RANK	HEAT 3	TIME
1.	Patrick Sang (KEN)	8:36.11
2.	Jens Volkmann (FRG)	8:36.37
3.	Hagen Melzer (GDR)	8:36.45
4.	Brian Abshire (USA)	8:36.56
5.	William Van Dijck (BEL)	8:36.80
6.	Bruno Le Stum (FRA)	8:36.95
7.	Fathi Baccouche (TUN)	8:38.67
8.	Roger Hackney (GBR)	8:39.30
9.	Brendan Quinn (IRL)	8:40.87
10.	Mohammed al-Dosari (KSA)	8:45.25
11.	Abdullah Al-Dosari (BRN)	9:10.85

== See also ==
- 1986 Men's European Championships 3000 m Steeplechase (Stuttgart)
- 1987 Men's World Championships 3000 m Steeplechase (Rome)
- 1990 Men's European Championships 3000 m Steeplechase (Split)
- 1991 Men's World Championships 3000 m Steeplechase (Tokyo)
