= Mark Rowland =

British

Personal information
- Nationality: British (English)
- Born: 7 March 1963 (age 63) Watersfield, West Sussex, England
- Height: 183 cm (6 ft 0 in)
- Weight: 68 kg (150 lb)

Sport
- Sport: Athletics
- Event: Steeplechase
- Club: Brighton Phoenix
Medal record
Men's athletics
Representing Great Britain
Olympic Games
Bronze medal – third place	1988 Seoul	3000 m st.
European Championships
Silver medal – second place	1990 Split	3000 m st.

Mark Robert Rowland (born 7 March 1963) is a male retired distance-runner from the United Kingdom, who specialised in the 3000m steeplechase and competed at the 1988 Summer Olympics.

== Biography ==
Rowland came third in the men's men's 3000 m Steeplechase at the 1988 Olympics behind the Kenyan competitors Julius Kariuki (gold) and Peter Koech (silver). His time was 8:07.96 minutes which remains a British record. Rowland became the eighth and, thus far, final British athlete to pick up a medal in the steeplechase event at the Olympics. His post-race interview at the track-side was famous for his quote:

I just kept telling myself to dig, dig, dig—and I did it! I've got a bloody medal!

Two years later, Rowland was beaten to the gold in a sprint finish in the same event at the European Championships in Split by the Italian athlete Francesco Panetta. He also represented England in the 5,000 metres event, at the 1990 Commonwealth Games in Auckland, New Zealand.

Rowland became the British 3,000 metres champion after winning the British AAA Championships title at the 1988 AAA Championships.

After retiring, he became a coach to many promising young British steeplechasers and was a steeplechase and middle-distance coach for UK Athletics. While coaching professionally in the United Kingdom, he coached Michael East to his 6th-place finish in the 1500m at the 2004 Athens Olympics. In 2008, Rowland became head coach of the Oregon Track Club Elite team, where he coached a number of athletes to Olympic and World Championships medals and finalist positions, including British middle-distance runner Jemma Simpson, American middle-distance runner Nick Symmonds and distance runner Lauren Fleshman, Botswana middle-distance runner Nijel Amos, Burundian middle-distance runner Francine Niyonsaba, and Kenyan distance runner Sally Kipyego, among others. In 2022, Rowland left Oregon Track Club to become an endurance coach at Athletics Canada's west hub in Victoria, British Columbia.

== International competitions ==
Year	Competition	Venue	Position	Event	Notes
Representing Great Britain / England
1987	European Indoor Championships	Liévin, France	4th	3000 m	7:54.64
1987	World Indoor Championships	Indianapolis, United States	4th	3000 m	8:04.27
1988	Olympic Games	Seoul, South Korea	3rd	3000 m steeplechase	8:07.96
1990	Commonwealth Games	Auckland, New Zealand	7th	5000 m	13:35.69
1990	European Championships	Split, Yugoslavia	2nd	3000 m steeplechase	8:13.27
1994	European Championships	Helsinki, Finland	4th	3000 m steeplechase	8:26.00
