= Athletics at the Friendship Games – Men's 3000 metres steeplechase =

The men's 3000 metres steeplechase event at the Friendship Games was held on 17 August 1984 at the Grand Arena of the Central Lenin Stadium in Moscow, Soviet Union.

== Results ==
Rank	Name	Nationality	Time	Notes
1st place, gold medalist(s)	Bogusław Mamiński	Poland	8:27.15	
2nd place, silver medalist(s)	Hagen Melzer	East Germany	8:27.43	
3rd place, bronze medalist(s)	Jan Hagelbrand	Sweden	8:32.36	
4	Václav Pátek	Czechoslovakia	8:33.11	
5	Panayot Kashanov	Bulgaria	8:33.12	
6	Valeriy Gryaznov	Soviet Union	8:34.26	
7	Andrey Popelev	Soviet Union	8:38.60	
8	Ivan Konovalov	Soviet Union	8:48.99	
9	Julián Giraldo	Colombia	8:51.41	
10	Ricardo Reupo	Peru	9:10.31	
11	Marcelo Cascabelo	Argentina	9:15.48	
	Eshetu Tura	Ethiopia	DNF	

== See also ==
- Athletics at the 1984 Summer Olympics – Men's 3000 metres steeplechase
