= 1987 European Athletics Indoor Championships – Men's 3000 metres =

The men's 3000 metres event at the 1987 European Athletics Indoor Championships was held on 21 and 22 February.

== Medalists ==
Gold	Silver	Bronze
José Luis González; Spain	Dieter Baumann; West Germany	Pascal Thiébaut; France

== Results ==
=== Heats ===
First 4 from each heat (Q) and the next 4 fastest (q) qualified for the semifinals.

Rank	Heat	Name	Nationality	Time	Notes
1	1	Adrian Passey	Great Britain	7:53.69	Q
2	1	Bruno Levant	France	7:53.70	Q
3	1	Dieter Baumann	West Germany	7:54.33	Q
4	1	Volker Welzel	West Germany	7:54.76	Q
5	1	Lubomír Tesáček	Czechoslovakia	7:55.30	q
6	1	Franco Boffi	Italy	7:56.06	q
7	2	Patriz Ilg	West Germany	8:01.96	Q
8	2	Mogens Guldberg	Denmark	8:02.00	Q
9	2	José Luis González	Spain	8:02.58	Q
10	2	Mark Rowland	Great Britain	8:02.93	Q
11	2	Pascal Thiébaut	France	8:04.53	q
12	2	Billy Dee	Great Britain	8:04.53	q
13	2	Kai Jenkel	Switzerland	8:08.92	
14	2	Walter Merlo	Italy	8:12.85	
15	2	Borislav Dević	Yugoslavia	8:19.00	
	1	Gábor Szabó	Hungary	DNF	
	1	Knut Hegvold	Norway	DNS	
	1	Nikolay Matiushenko	Soviet Union	DNS	

=== Final ===
Rank	Name	Nationality	Time	Notes
1st place, gold medalist(s)	José Luis González	Spain	7:52.27	
2nd place, silver medalist(s)	Dieter Baumann	West Germany	7:53.93	
3rd place, bronze medalist(s)	Pascal Thiébaut	France	7:54.03	
4	Mark Rowland	Great Britain	7:54.64	
5	Mogens Guldberg	Denmark	7:56.10	
6	Bruno Levant	France	7:56.42	
7	Franco Boffi	Italy	7:59.23	
8	Billy Dee	Great Britain	8:00.73	
9	Lubomír Tesáček	Czechoslovakia	8:02.04	
10	Volker Welzel	West Germany	8:17.72	
	Patriz Ilg	West Germany	DNF	
	Adrian Passey	Great Britain	DQ	
