= 1978 European Athletics Championships – Men's 3000 metres steeplechase =

Men's 3000 metres steeplechase at the European Athletics Championships

The men's 3000 metres steeplechase at the 1978 European Athletics Championships was held in Prague, then Czechoslovakia, at Stadion Evžena Rošického on 1 and 3 September 1978.

== Medalists ==
Gold	Bronisław Malinowski; Poland
Silver	Patriz Ilg; West Germany
Bronze	Ismo Toukonen; Finland

== Results ==
=== Final ===
3 September

Rank	Name	Nationality	Time	Notes
1st place, gold medalist(s)	Bronisław Malinowski	Poland	8:15.08	
2nd place, silver medalist(s)	Patriz Ilg	West Germany	8:16.92	
3rd place, bronze medalist(s)	Ismo Toukonen	Finland	8:18.29	
4	Michael Karst	West Germany	8:19.01	
5	Paul Copu	Romania	8:20.41	
6	Vasile Bichea	Romania	8:24.86	
7	František Bartoš	Czechoslovakia	8:38.0	
8	Manfred Schoeneberg	West Germany	8:40.1	
9	Giuseppe Gerbi	Italy	8:42.8	
10	Dennis Coates	Great Britain	8:44.0	
11	Krzysztof Wesołowski	Poland	8:46.4	
12	Vladimir Lisovskiy	Soviet Union	9:00.5	

=== Heats ===
1 September

==== Heat 1 ====
Rank	Name	Nationality	Time	Notes
1	Giuseppe Gerbi	Italy	8:29.10	Q
2	Ismo Toukonen	Finland	8:29.5	Q
3	Krzysztof Wesołowski	Poland	8:30.0	Q
4	František Bartoš	Czechoslovakia	8:31.94	q
5	Manfred Schoeneberg	West Germany	8:34.2	q
6	Dan Glans	Sweden	8:34.5	
7	Dan Betini	Romania	8:34.9	
8	Vladimir Filonov	Soviet Union	8:39.0	
9	Paul Thys	Belgium	8:43.8	
10	Wolfgang Konrad	Austria	8:43.9	

==== Heat 2 ====
Rank	Name	Nationality	Time	Notes
1	Paul Copu	Romania	8:33.29	Q
2	Michael Karst	West Germany	8:33.7	Q
3	Dennis Coates	Great Britain	8:34.7	Q
4	Serhiy Olizarenko	Soviet Union	8:36.7	
5	Roberto Volpi	Italy	8:39.1	
6	Dušan Moravčík	Czechoslovakia	8:43.2	
7	Kazimierz Maranda	Poland	8:48.4	
8	Bruno Lafranchi	Switzerland	8:51.7	
9	Christer Ström	Sweden	8:53.8	
10	Hans Koeleman	Netherlands	8:59.6	
11	Domingo Ramón	Spain	9:07.8	

==== Heat 3 ====
Rank	Name	Nationality	Time	Notes
1	Vasile Bichea	Romania	8:25.43	Q
2	Bronisław Malinowski	Poland	8:25.58	Q
3	Patriz Ilg	West Germany	8:30.4	Q
4	Vladimir Lisovskiy	Soviet Union	8:31.4	q
5	Gerhard Wetzig	East Germany	8:36.1	
6	Jean-Luc Lemire	France	8:38.0	
7	Antonio Campos	Spain	8:38.2	
8	Milan Slovák	Czechoslovakia	8:41.4	
9	Tapio Kantanen	Finland	8:46.0	
10	John Davies	Great Britain	8:57.4	
11	Jan Hagelbrandt	Sweden	9:21.1	

== Participation ==
According to an unofficial count, 32 athletes from 16 countries participated in the event.

- Austria (1)
- Belgium (1)
- Czechoslovakia (3)
- East Germany (1)
- Finland (2)
- France (1)
- Italy (2)
- Netherlands (1)
- Poland (3)
- Romania (3)
- Soviet Union (3)
- Spain (2)
- Sweden (3)
- Switzerland (1)
- Great Britain (2)
- West Germany (3)
