= Bruno Le Stum =

French long-distance runner

Medal record

Men's athletics

World Cross Country Championships
Silver medal – second place	1992 Boston	Long race – Team

Bruno Le Stum (born 25 December 1959) is a retired French long-distance runner who specialized in the 5000 metres and cross-country running.

He was born in Le Havre, but represented the club Montpellier PSC. He competed at the 1987 World Championships, the 1988 Olympic Games and the 1991 World Championships without reaching the final. On the regional level he won the silver medal at the 1989 Jeux de la Francophonie, he finished eighth at the 1990 European Championships and eighteenth—in the marathon—at the 1994 European Championships. His personal best time was 8.15.28 minutes, achieved in July 1991 in Nice.

At the World Cross Country Championships, he recorded many top placements. He finished ninth in 1987 (fifth in the team competition), eleventh in 1989 (fourth in the team competition), and tenth in 1992 (silver medal in the team competition).

Le Stum finished second behind Eddie Wedderburn in the steeplechase event at the British 1987 AAA Championships.
