= Athletics at the 1987 Pan American Games – Men's 3000 metres steeplechase =

Men's 3,000 metres steeplechase at the Pan American Games

The men's 3000 metres steeplechase event at the 1987 Pan American Games was held in Indianapolis, United States on 12 August.

== Results ==
Rank	Name	Nationality	Time	Notes
1st place, gold medalist(s)	Adauto Domingues	Brazil	8:23.26	GR, NR
2nd place, silver medalist(s)	Henry Marsh	United States	8:23.77	
3rd place, bronze medalist(s)	Brian Abshire	United States	8:27.30	
4	Emilio Ulloa	Chile	8:37.80	
5	Ricardo Vera	Uruguay	8:39.34	
6	Marcelo Cascabelo	Argentina	8:41.76	
7	Juan Ramón Conde	Cuba	8:43.78	
8	Víctor Sánchez	Paraguay	10:13.72	
