= Krzysztof Wesołowski =

Polish middle-distance runner

Personal information
- Nationality: Polish
- Born: 9 December 1956 (age 69) Wałbrzych, Poland

Sport
- Sport: Middle-distance running
- Event: Steeplechase

Krzysztof Wesołowski (born 9 December 1956) is a Polish middle-distance runner. He competed in the men's 3000 metres steeplechase at the 1980 Summer Olympics.

== International competitions ==
Year	Competition	Venue	Position	Event	Notes
Representing Poland
1978	European Championships	Prague, Czechoslovakia	11th	3000 m s'chase	8:46.4
1980	Olympic Games	Moscow, Soviet Union	16th (sf)	3000 m s'chase	8:33.02
1982	European Championships	Athens, Greece	19th (h)	3000 m s'chase	8:35.33
1983	World Championships	Helsinki, Finland	10th (h)	3000 m s'chase	8:27.0^{1}

^{1}Did not start in the semifinals
