= Yehuda Zadok =

Israeli long-distance runner

Personal information
- Native name: יהודה צדוק
- Born: December 29, 1958 (age 67) Israel
- Height: 5 ft 8 in (173 cm)
- Weight: 143 lb (65 kg)

Sport
- Country: Israel
- Sport: Track
- Event(s): long-distance runner; specialized in the 3000 metre steeplechase
- College team: Santa Monica College

Achievements and titles
- Personal bests: 3000 metre race: 8:09.0 (1980); 3000 metre steeplechase: 8:35.41 (1984)

Yehuda Zadok (also "Tzadok"; Hebrew: יהודה צדוק; born December 29, 1958) is an Israeli former Olympic runner. He set Israeli records in the 3000 metre race in 1980, and in the 3000 metre steeplechase in 1984. At the 1981 Maccabiah Games, he won the 10,000 metres race.

Zadok was born in Israel and is Jewish.

== Running career ==
His personal best in the 3000 metre race is an Israeli record 8:09.0 which he ran in 1980, and his personal best in the 3000 metre steeplechase was an Israeli record 8:35.41, in 1984.

He competed for Israel at the 1984 Summer Olympics in Los Angeles, California, at the age of 25. In the Men's 3,000 metres Steeplechase he came in 9th in Heat 3 with a time of 8:42.28. When he competed in the Olympics, he was 5 feet 8 inches (173 cm) tall and weighed 143 pounds (65 kg).

In 1985 and 1986 he attended and ran track for Santa Monica College, coming in second at the 1985 Metropolitan Conference Championships, in Pacific Palisades, with a time of 20:51 in the four-mile cross-country race.
