= Cha Han-sik =

South Korean middle-distance runner

Personal information
- Nationality: South Korean
- Born: 9 February 1965 (age 61)

Sport
- Sport: Middle-distance running
- Event: Steeplechase
- University team: Daegu University

Korean name
- Hangul: 차한식
- Hanja: 車漢軾
- RR: Cha Hansik
- MR: Ch'a Hansik

Cha Han-sik (born 9 February 1965) is a South Korean middle-distance runner. He competed in the men's 3000 metres steeplechase at the 1988 Summer Olympics.
