= Brian Abshire =

American long-distance runner

Brian Kenneth Abshire (born November 14, 1963) is a retired long-distance runner from the United States (Richmond, California), who competed for the U.S. at the 1988 Summer Olympics in the men's 3,000 meter steeplechase. He won the bronze medal in the same event at the 1987 Pan American Games, behind Brazil's Adauto Domingues (gold) and countryman Henry Marsh (silver).

He started college in Oregon at Clackamas Community College, but then transferred to Auburn University where he was twice an All-American in cross-country, an All-American indoors in the 3,000 metres, and a two-time All-American in the steeplechase.

Abshire was a member of Athletics West.
