= Patriz Ilg =

German athlete

Personal information
- Born: 5 December 1957 (age 68) Aalen-Oberalfingen
Medal record
Men's athletics
Representing West Germany
World Championships
Gold medal – first place	1983 Helsinki	3000 m steeplechase
European Championships
Gold medal – first place	1982 Athens	3000 m steeplechase
Silver medal – second place	1978 Prague	3000 m steeplechase
Bronze medal – third place	1986 Stuttgart	3000 m steeplechase
European Indoor Championships
Gold medal – first place	1982 Milan	3000 m

Patriz Ilg (born 5 December 1957 in Aalen-Oberalfingen) is a retired 3000 m steeplechaser from West Germany.

== Biography ==
He won a silver medal at the 1978 European Championships and gold medals at the 1982 European Championships in Athens and the 1983 World Championships in Helsinki. At the European Indoor Championships he competed in the 3000 metres and won the gold medal in 1982 and finished sixth in 1984.

At the 1986 European Championships Ilg came close to defending his title. However, he was overtaken on the final straight by Francesco Panetta (silver) and Hagen Melzer of the GDR (gold). In 1987 Ilg participated in the World Championships final in Rome but missed out on a medal.

His time of 8:15.06 minutes from the 1983 World Championships in Helsinki remained his career best time. This result places him eighth on the German all-time performers list, behind Damian Kallabis, Hagen Melzer, Frank Baumgartl, Rainer Schwarz, Uwe Pflügner, Michael Karst and Steffen Brand.

He won eight German national titles, in 1978, 1980–1982 and 1985–1988. He competed for the sports clubs TG Hofen and LAC Quelle Fürth during his active career.

Sporting positions
Preceded by (Poland) Bronisław Malinowski	Men's 3000 m steeplechase best year performance 1981	Succeeded by (United States) Henry Marsh
