= Ismo Toukonen =

Finnish runner (born 1954)

Medal record

Men's athletics

Representing Finland

European Championships
Bronze medal – third place	1978 Prague	3000 m st.

Ismo Tenho Tapio Toukonen (born 25 April 1954) is a retired Finnish runner who specialized in the 3000 metres steeplechase.

He was born in Hollola. He finished twelfth at the 1976 Olympic Games and won the bronze medal at the 1978 European Championships. He also finished lowly at the 1976 and 1980 World Cross Country Championships.

Toukonen became Finnish steeplechase champion in 1978 and 1983, and 10,000 metres champion in 1985. He also became national indoor 3000 metres champion in 1980.

His personal best steeplechase time was 8:18.29 minutes, achieved at the 1978 European Championships. In the 3000 metres he ran in 7:50.9 minutes (1981, Lahti); in the 5000 metres he ran in 13:37.83 minutes (1976, Turku) and in the 10,000 metres 28:35.61 minutes (1982, Kouvola).
