= Raymond Pannier =

French former athlete (born 1961)

Personal information
- Born: 12 February 1961 (age 65) Saint-Quentin-en-Yvelines, France
- Height: 1.74 m (5 ft 9 in)
- Weight: 63 kg (139 lb)

Sport
- Sport: Athletics
- Event: 3000 m steeplechase
- Club: Marignane CA

Raymond Pannier (born 12 February 1961 in Saint-Quentin-en-Yvelines) is a French former athlete who specialised in the 3000 metres steeplechase. He represented his country at the 1988 Summer Olympics as well as the 1987 World Championships, reaching the final on both occasions.

== International competitions ==
| Year | Competition | Venue | Position | Event | Notes |
Representing France
| 1979 | European Junior Championships | Bydgoszcz, Poland | 11th | 2000 m s'chase | 5:40.00 |
| 1982 | European Championships | Athens, Greece | 23rd (h) | 3000 m s'chase | 8:40.41 |
| 1986 | European Championships | Stuttgart, West Germany | 16th (h) | 3000 m s'chase | 8:28.73 |
| 1987 | World Championships | Rome, Italy | 10th | 3000 m s'chase | 8:26.50 |
| 1988 | Olympic Games | Seoul, South Korea | 12th | 3000 m s'chase | 8:23.80 |

== Personal bests ==
- 1500 metres – 3:40.5 (Fontainebleau 1982)
- 3000 metres – 7:45.82 (La Coruña 1988)
- 5000 metres – 13:35.71 (Koblenz 1988)
- 2000 metres steeplechase – 5:31.01 (Seoul 1988)
- 3000 metres steeplechase – 8:13.88 (Nice 1987)
