= William Van Dijck =

Belgian track athlete

Personal information
- Born: 24 January 1961 (age 65)
Medal record
Men's athletics
Representing Belgium
World Championships
Bronze medal – third place	1987 Rome	3000 m st.
European Championships
Bronze medal – third place	1994 Helsinki	3000 m st.

William Van Dijck (born 24 January 1961) is a Belgian former athlete, primarily active on the 3000m steeplechase.

== Biography ==
Van Dijck was born in Leuven. He was the first Belgian to win a medal at the World Championships, winning the bronze medal at the 1987 World Championships. He won a second bronze at the 1994 European Championships. He became Belgian Sportsman of the year in 1986. Van Dijck quit athletics in 1997 and now works in a bank in Geel.

He also applied himself to cross country running and won the Lotto Cross Cup in the 1993–94 and 1995–96 seasons.

== Achievements ==
- All results regarding 3000 metres steeplechase

Year	Competition	Venue	Position	Notes
Representing Belgium
1983	World Championships	Helsinki, Finland	semi-final	8:39.01
1984	Olympic Games	Los Angeles, United States	semi-final	8:23.08
1986	European Championships	Stuttgart, Germany	5th	8:20.19
1987	World Championships	Rome, Italy	3rd	8:12:19
1988	Olympic Games	Seoul, South Korea	5th	8:13.99
1990	European Championships	Split, Yugoslavia	5th	8:21.71
1991	World Championships	Tokyo, Japan	9th	8:30.46
1992	Olympic Games	Barcelona, Spain	9th	8:22.51
1992	World Cup	Havana, Cuba	2nd	8:32.06
1994	European Championships	Helsinki, Finland	3rd	8:24.86

- 1986: Belgian record in Brussels: 8:10.01, the best year performance worldwide
- 1986: National Trophy for Sporting Achievements

Van Dijck was 9 times Belgian Champion steeplechaser between 1983 and 1994.

Sporting positions
Preceded by (United States) Henry Marsh	Men's 3.000m Steeple Best Year Performance; 1986	Succeeded by (Italy) Francesco Panetta
