= Féthi Baccouche =

Tunisian long-distance runner (born 1960)

Personal information
- Born: 16 November 1960 (age 65) Tunis, Tunisia

Sport
- Sport: Track and field
Medal record
Representing Tunisia
African Championships
Bronze medal – third place	1985 Cairo	3000m steeplechase
Mediterranean Games
Gold medal – first place	1987 Latakia	10,000m
Bronze medal – third place	1987 Latakia	3000m steeplechase
Summer Universiade
Silver medal – second place	1983 Edmonton	5000m
Bronze medal – third place	1983 Edmonton	10,000m

Féthi Baccouche (born 16 November 1960) is a retired Tunisian long-distance runner who specialized in the 3000 metres steeplechase, the 5000 metres and the 10,000 metres.

He was born in Tunis, and represented the club ASM Tunis. One of his first international achievements was a gold medal at the 1976 ISF World Gymnasiade.

He finished twelfth in the steeplechase at the 1984 Olympic Games, and also competed in the 5000 metres at the same Olympics. He also competed at the 1983 World Championships, the 1987 World Championships and the 1988 Olympic Games without reaching the final. His best result at the World Cross Country Championships was a 38th place from 1985.

At the 1987 Mediterranean Games he won the bronze medal in the steeplechase and the gold in the 10,000 metres. He won gold medals in both these events at the 1985 Pan Arab Games. At the 1985 African Championships he won a steeplechase bronze medal, and at the 1983 Summer Universiade he won the 5000 metres silver medal and the 10,000 metres bronze medal.

His personal best times were 7.46.17 minutes in the 3000 metres, achieved in July 1986 in Paris; 8.15.07 minutes in the 3000 metres steeplechase, achieved in July 1987 in Helsinki; and 13.13.94 minutes in the 5000 metres, achieved in July 1987 at Bislett stadion in Oslo. In middle distance events he had 3.37.98 minutes in the 1500 metres, achieved in July 1987 in Nice; and 3.57.90 minutes in the mile run, achieved in June 1987 in Verona.

Baccouche stands at 1.71 m (5 ft 7 1/2 in) and weighed about 59 kilograms (130 lb) during his active career.
