= Joseph Mahmoud =

French athlete (born 1955)

Personal information
- Born: 13 December 1955 (age 70) Safi, Morocco
Medal record
Men's athletics
Representing France
Olympic Games
Silver medal – second place	1984 Los Angeles	3000m steeplechase

Joseph Mahmoud (born 13 December 1955 in Safi, Morocco) is a retired French athlete who mainly competed in the 3000 metre steeple chase.

He competed for France at the 1984 Summer Olympics held in Los Angeles, California, where he won the silver medal in the men's 3000 metre steeplechase event. He also competed in the same event at the 1992 Summer Olympics.

== Achievements ==
Year	Competition	Venue	Position	Event	Notes
Representing France
1982	European Championships	Athens, Greece	10th (h)	3000 m steeplechase	8:27.70
1983	Mediterranean Games	Casablanca, Morocco	1st	3000 m steeplechase	8:19.29
1983	World Championships	Helsinki, Finland	4th	3000 m steeplechase	8:18.32
1984	Olympic Games	Los Angeles, California	2nd	3000 m steeplechase	8:13.31
1986	European Championships	Stuttgart, West Germany	6th	3000m steeplechase	8:20.25
1989	Jeux de la Francophonie	Casablanca, Morocco	3rd	3000 m steeplechase	8:30.60
1990	European Championships	Split, Yugoslavia	—	3000m steeplechase	DNF

Records
Preceded by (Sweden) Anders Gärderud	Men's 3000 m steeplechase European record holder 24 August 1984 – 19 July 2002	Succeeded by (Netherlands) Simon Vroemen
Sporting positions
Preceded by (United States) Henry Marsh	Men's 3000 m steeplechase best year performance 1984	Succeeded by (United States) Henry Marsh
