= Liam O'Brien (athlete) =

Irish middle-distance runner

Personal information
- Nationality: Irish
- Born: 11 October 1954 (age 71)

Sport
- Sport: Middle-distance running
- Event: Steeplechase

Liam O'Brien (born 11 October 1954) is an Irish middle-distance runner. He competed in the men's 3000 metres steeplechase at the 1984 Summer Olympics.
