= Julius Kariuki =

Kenyan steeplechase runner

Personal information
- Born: June 12, 1961 (age 65) Nyahururu, Kenya

Sport
- Sport: Track and field
Medal record
Representing Kenya
Olympic Games
Gold medal – first place	1988 Seoul	3000 m steeplechase
African Championships
Gold medal – first place	1985 Cairo	3000 m steeplechase
Commonwealth Games
Gold medal – first place	1990 Auckland	3000 m steeplechase
Summer Universiade
Gold medal – first place	1989 Duisburg	10,000 m

Julius Kariuki (born June 12, 1961) is the winner of the 3,000 m steeplechase at the 1988 Summer Olympics.

Born in Nyahururu, Kenya, Kariuki's athletic career started slowly. He made his international debut at the 1984 Summer Olympics, where he finished seventh in the 3000 m steeplechase.

The following year, Kariuki won the steeplechase at the African Championships in Athletics, and then followed that up with a victory in a slow race at the IAAF World Cup. At the Seoul Olympics, Kariuki was mostly considered as the third-string Kenyan runner, but in the final, after a very fast start, Kariuki and his fellow countryman Peter Koech broke clear, and a lap later, Kariuki sped away from his more experienced teammate, and went on to win the gold medal. He slowed down in the last few metres and finished in a time of 8:05.51, just outside Henry Rono's world record of 8:05.40.

In 1989, Kariuki won the 10,000 m at the Summer Universiade and the 3000 m steeplechase again in the IAAF World Cup. In 1990, he won gold easily at the Commonwealth Games and finished fourth at the following year's World Championships. Kariuki remained one of the world's top steeplechasers for several more years after that, but the dominance of Kenyan talent was so great, that he was never able again to gain representation on the national team to a major international championship.

Sporting positions
Preceded by (Italy) Francesco Panetta	Men's 3,000 m Steeple Best Year Performance; 1988	Succeeded by (Kenya) Peter Koech
