= Athletics West =

American athletic team

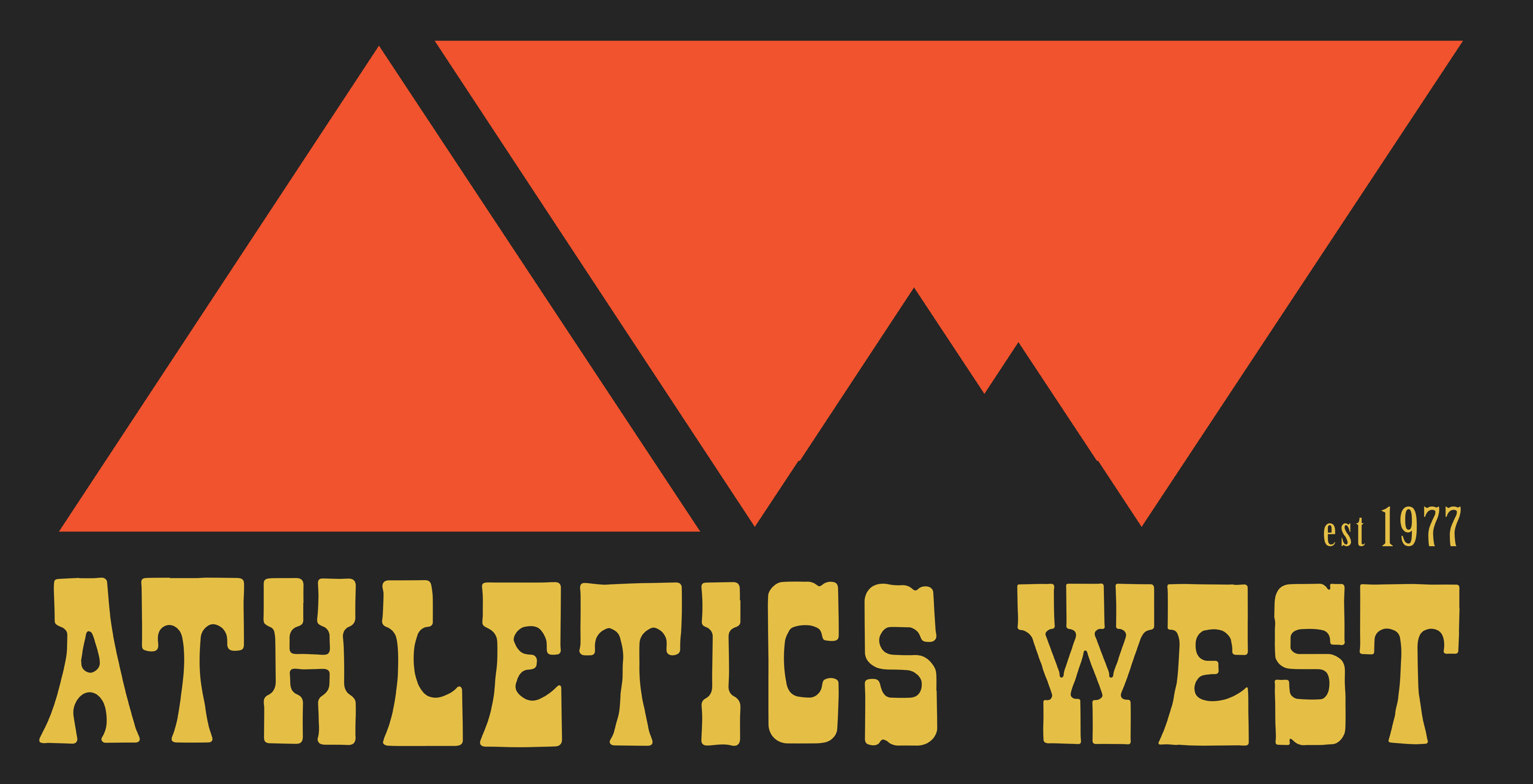
Rare alternate logo which was seldom used. Circa: Around period where Nike took over the name and team

Athletics West (frequently abbreviated in results as AW) was an American running team formed in 1977 by Bill Bowerman, Phil Knight and Geoff Hollister.

== Overview ==
During the 1970s, a definitive running program for young athletes to continue competing outside of college did not exist in the United States (U.S.). The formation and success of Athletics West, together with the success and popularity of American runners like Craig Virgin (charter member), Steve Prefontaine, Frank Shorter and Bill Rodgers, helped inspire the 1970s running boom. Bowerman helped to popularize the concept of jogging in the U.S. by publishing Jogging in 1966, after meeting Arthur Lydiard in New Zealand in 1962.

== History ==
=== 1970s ===
In 1977 infrastructure and support was absent from the Amateur Athletic Union, the predecessor to USA Track and Field. Because of the demands for amateurism, young American runners needed to finance their own training and travel for competition. While scholastic and collegiate competitions took better care of student athletes, post-collegiate athletes were on their own, a demand that was immensely challenging.

Bowerman and Knight, who were runners themselves, recognized the situation that their sport existed in, so they decided to take the meager profits from their fledgling Nike company to try to reignite competitive running in the U.S. They recruited Harry Johnson, a high school coach who was known for his warden-like demeanor and rigorous training tactics. Johnson was the winningest coach in Oregon high school history, with the attainment of 25 state titles in his career. Johnson's first acquisition was Craig Virgin, a young runner from Illinois, U.S.

Virgin was joined by a team of gifted athletes, including Jim Crawford, an Army vet who specialized in the 1500 meters; Phil Kane, an accounting major and powerhouse in the 1,500-meter event; seminary student and marathoner Jeff Wells; Doug Brown; George Malley; and Mike Manke. Mac Wilkins and shot putter Al Feuerbach signed on shortly thereafter.

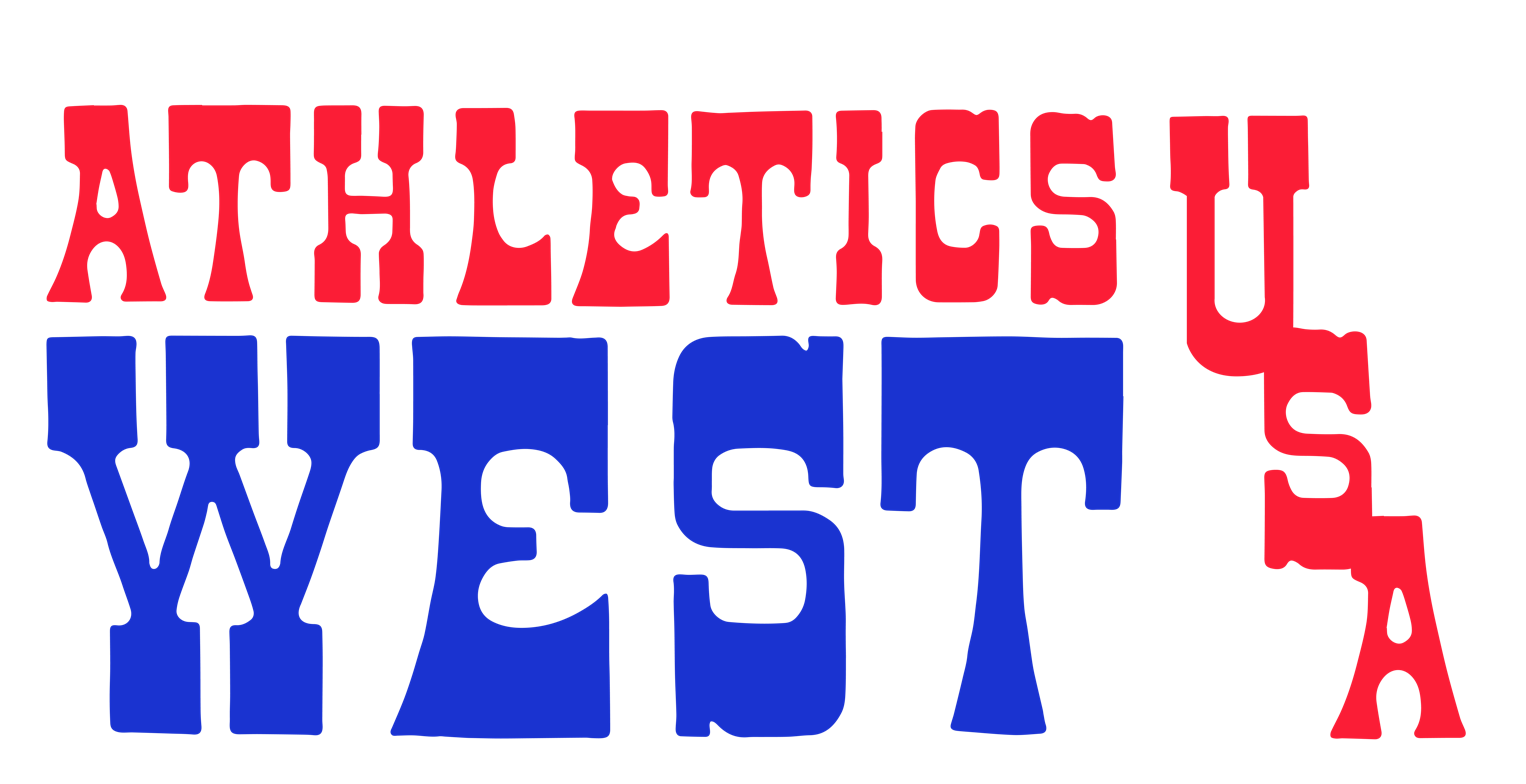
Olympic Qualifier shirt design from 1979 for the 1980 Olympic trials

Nationally, the Athletics West men performed well in competitions, with Wells winning the marathon in Honolulu, Virgin winning a title in the 5,000-meter event in Knoxville and Malley placing first in the 1,500-meter event in Corvallis, Oregon. The team then traveled to Europe for two months to engage in international-level competition for the first time. Athletics West's final American meet before their Europe trip was the national championship event, where Virgin won the club's first national championship in the 10,000 meters, they swept the steeplechase, and Feuerbach won the shot put.

In Europe, the team then competed against athletes who had benefited from years of state-sponsored training. However, every single Athletics West runner clocked personal bests while competing in Europe, including eight records apiece set by Virgin and Brown.

Although the original nucleus of the team dissolved after the European tour, the experimental opening season of Athletics West was successful. Even though they had been two of the team's best performers, Virgin and Malley left the team due to Coach Johnson's dictatorial coaching style. Johnson announced at the conclusion of the team's first year: "Everybody understands and believes in our approach now. They realize the discipline and courage involved in taking a long-term approach to training. I think there's a different perspective now.

Between 1979 and 1989, Henry Marsh, Doug Brown and Brian Diemer swept the national steeplechase championship all in the Athletics West uniform. Diemer also won in 1990, but the team name had evolved into Nike International.

=== 1980s ===
Athletic West achieved further success in the U.S. in the 1980s in cross country running competitions. The team won the men's long course team competition on seven occasions: six in succession, from 1981 to 1986, and again in 1989.

Anthony Sandoval won the 1980 U.S. Olympic Trials Marathon in 2:10:19 faster than the Olympic Marathon Winner that year. The Games were boycotted by the United States.

During the team's second year, more athletes were recruited, doctors and medical testing were introduced, and world-class marathoner Alberto Salazar joined the team in the early 1980s. The team also included women athletes during this decade, such as Joan Benoit Samuelson and Mary Decker Slaney—the women's long course team won in competition six times: once in 1981 and then five consecutive times, from 1985 to 1989. Athletics West later established operations on the East Coast of the United States, prior to global expansion.

Relatively unknown Tom Byers defeated a crowd of the top world class 1500 metres runners, including then world record holder Steve Ovett, at the 1981 Bislett Games while wearing an Athletics West uniform. Byers was in the race to be the pacemaker, but the peloton ran tactically and ignored Byers until it was too late.

Jeff Drenth, an Athletics West team member, died in the team office following a workout in 1986. Aged 24 years at the time, the cause of Drenth's death remains unknown.

== Trademark ==
Nike filed a U.S. federal trademark registration for the trademark of the Athletics West name on May 11, 2006. The registration was active until December 13, 2013, when it was canceled under Section 8. The name and logo are now in the public domain.

== Allegations ==
A 1992 book, Swoosh, The Unauthorized Story of Nike and the Men Who Played There, written by Julie Strasser and Laurie Becklund, alleged that Nike had arranged for under-the-table payments to athletes on the Athletics West team, which were forbidden at the time. The book also stated that many athletes on the team used steroids with Nike's knowledge, between 1977 and 1985. Performance-enhancing drugs are still illegal.
