= Mariano Scartezzini =

Italian long-distance runner

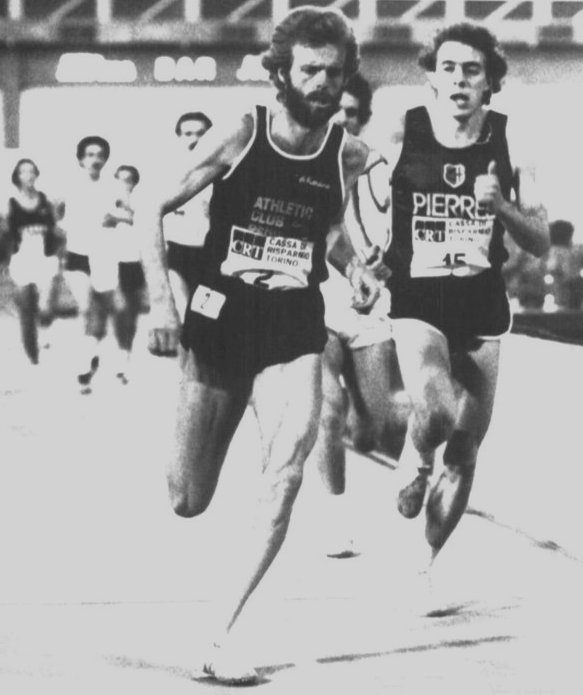

Personal information
- Nationality: Italian
- Born: November 7, 1954 (age 71) Trento, Italy
- Height: 1.86 m (6 ft 1 in)
- Weight: 69 kg (152 lb)

Sport
- Country: Italy
- Sport: Athletics
- Event: 3000 metres steeplechase
- Club: G.S. Fiamme Gialle

Achievements and titles
- Personal best: 3000 m st: 8:12.5 (1980)
Medal record
Event	1st	2nd	3rd
Mediterranean Games	1	0	0
Universiade	0	1	1
World Cup	0	1	1
European Cup	2	0	0
Summer Universiade
Silver medal – second place	1979 Mexico City	3000 m st
Bronze medal – third place	1981 Bucharest	3000 m st
Mediterranean Games
Gold medal – first place	1979 Split	3000 m st

Mariano Scartezzini (born 7 November 1954) is a retired long-distance runner from Italy, who mainly competed in the men's 3,000 metres Steeplechase event.

He won seven medals, at senior level, at the International athletics competitions.

== Biography ==
He finished in ninth place in this event at the inaugural 1983 World Championships in Helsinki, Finland. He is three-time national champion (1979, 1981 and 1983) in the event. He has 30 caps in national team from 1975 to 1984.

== Top 25 lists ==
Year	Performance	World Ranking	Venue	Date
1979	8.22.72	3	(Italy) Turin	Jun 9
1980	8.12.5	4	(Italy) Rome	Aug 5
1981	8.13.32	1	(Socialist Federal Republic of Yugoslavia) Zagreb	Aug 16
1982	8.22.34	14	(West Germany) Berlin	Aug 20
1983	8.21.17	19	(Finland) Helsinki	Aug 12

== National titles ==
Mariano Scartezzini has won 5 times the individual national championship.

- 3 wins in the 3000 metres steeplechase (1979, 1981, 1983)
- 1 win in the 5000 metres (1979)
- 1 win in the 3000 metres indoor (1983)

== See also ==
- 1981 Men's Best Year Performers - 3000 metres steeplechase
- Italian all-time top lists - 3000 metres steeplechase

Sporting positions
Preceded by (Poland) Bronislaw Malinowski	Men's 3000 m steeplechase best year performance 1981	Succeeded by (United States) Henry Marsh
