= Francisco Sánchez (runner) =

Spanish long-distance runner

Francisco Sánchez Vargas (born 18 May 1958 in La Rinconada, Seville) is a retired Spanish long-distance runner who specialized in the 3000 metres steeplechase. He represented Spain at the 1980 Olympic Games.

He won the bronze medal at the 1983 Mediterranean Games. He competed at the 1983 World Championships, the 1986 European Championships and the 1987 World Championships without reaching the final. He won the 1988 edition of the Cross Zornotza.

His personal best time was 8.16.59 minutes, achieved in August 1983 in West Berlin.
