= 1990 European Athletics Championships – Men's 3000 metres steeplechase =

Men's 3000 metres steeplechase at the European Athletics Championships

These are the official results of the Men's 3,000 metres Steeplechase event at the 1990 European Championships in Split, Yugoslavia, held at Stadion Poljud on 28 and 30 August 1990.

== Medalists ==
Gold	Francesco Panetta; Italy
Silver	Mark Rowland; United Kingdom
Bronze	Alessandro Lambruschini; Italy

== Final ==
Rank	Final	Time
	Francesco Panetta (ITA)	8:12.66
	Mark Rowland (GBR)	8:13.27
	Alessandro Lambruschini (ITA)	8:15.82
4.	Angelo Carosi (ITA)	8:17.48
5.	William Van Dijck (BEL)	8:21.71
6.	Tom Hanlon (GBR)	8:21.73
7.	Hagen Melzer (GDR)	8:22.48
8.	Bruno Le Stum (FRA)	8:23.39
9.	Antonio Peula (ESP)	8:24.47
10.	Benito Nogales (ESP)	8:26.11
11.	José Carlos Pereira (POR)	8:27.04
—	Joseph Mahmoud (FRA)	DNF

== Heats ==
Rank	Heat 1	Time
1.	Mark Rowland (GBR)	8:22.55
2.	William Van Dijck (BEL)	8:23.05
3.	Alessandro Lambruschini (ITA)	8:23.16
4.	Bruno Le Stum (FRA)	8:23.21
5.	Benito Nogales (ESP)	8:23.52
6.	José Carlos Pereira (POR)	8:23.92
7.	Vasily Koromyslov (URS)	8:24.59
8.	Colin Walker (GBR)	8:26.95
9.	Jörgen Salo (FIN)	8:27.98
10.	Nihat Bağcı (TUR)	8:52.34
—	Mirosław Żerkowski (POL)	DNF
—	Uwe Pflügner (GDR)	DNF

Rank	Heat 2	Time
1.	Francesco Panetta (ITA)	8:20.65
2.	Tom Hanlon (GBR)	8:21.76
3.	Angelo Carosi (ITA)	8:21.80
4.	Hagen Melzer (GDR)	8:22.81
5.	Antonio Peula (ESP)	8:23.47
6.	Joseph Mahmoud (FRA)	8:24.36
7.	Bogusław Mamiński (POL)	8:24.82
8.	Michael Heist (FRG)	8:24.97
9.	Vule Maksimović (YUG)	8:33.07
10.	Valerey Vandyak (URS)	8:43.72

== Participation ==
According to an unofficial count, 22 athletes from 13 countries participated in the event.

- Belgium (1)
- East Germany (2)
- Finland (1)
- France (2)
- Italy (3)
- Poland (2)
- Portugal (1)
- Soviet Union (2)
- Spain (2)
- Turkey (1)
- United Kingdom (3)
- West Germany (1)
- Yugoslavia (1)

== See also ==
- 1988 Men's Olympic 3,000m Steeplechase (Seoul)
- 1991 Men's World Championships 3,000m Steeplechase (Tokyo)
- 1992 Men's Olympic 3,000m Steeplechase (Barcelona)
