= Bogusław Mamiński =

Polish long-distance runner (born 1955)

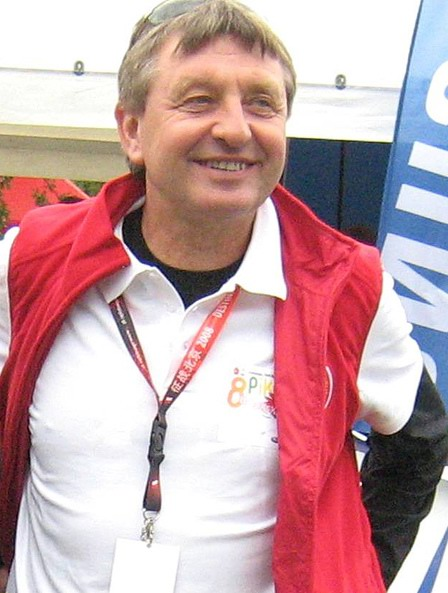
- Mamiński in 2007

Personal information
- Born: 18 December 1955 (age 70) Kamień Pomorski, Poland
- Height: 180 cm (5 ft 11 in)
- Weight: 69 kg (152 lb)
Medal record
Men's Athletics
Representing Poland
World Championships
Silver medal – second place	1983 Helsinki	3000 m steeplechase
European Championships
Silver medal – second place	1982 Athens	3000 m steeplechase

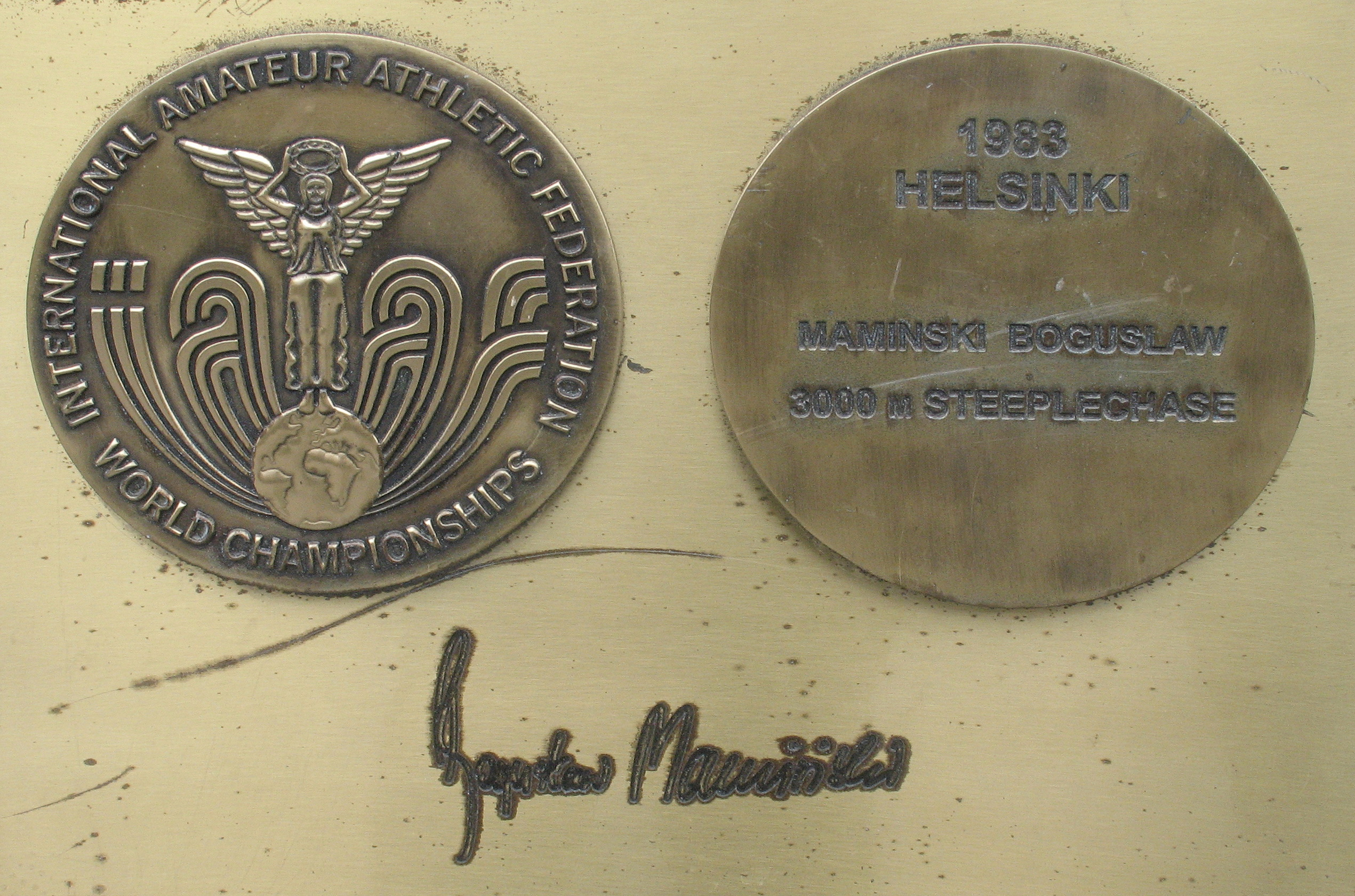
Copy of B.Mamiński medal and autograph in Sports Stars Avenue in Dziwnów

Bogusław Mamiński (born 18 December 1955 in Kamień Pomorski) is a retired long-distance runner from Poland, known for winning the silver medal in the men's 3,000m Steeplechase event at the 1982 European Championships in Athens, Greece. He did the same one year later at the inaugural World Championships. Mamiński set his personal best (8:09.18) in the event on 24 August 1984 at a meet in Brussels, Belgium.

== International competitions ==
Year	Competition	Venue	Position	Event	Notes
Representing Poland
1980	Olympic Games	Moscow, Soviet Union	7th	3000 m s'chase	8:19.43
1981	Pacific Conference Games	Christchurch, New Zealand	2nd	3000 m s'chase	8:24.04
1981	World Cup	Rome, Italy	1st	3000 m s'chase	8:19.89^{1}
1982	European Championships	Athens, Greece	2nd	3000 m s'chase	8:19.22
1983	World Championships	Helsinki, Finland	2nd	3000 m s'chase	8:17.03
1984	Friendship Games	Moscow, Soviet Union	1st	3000 m s'chase	8:27.15
1986	Goodwill Games	Moscow, Soviet Union	–	3000 m s'chase	DNF
1986	European Championships	Stuttgart, West Germany	11th (h)	3000 m s'chase	8:27.11^{2}
1987	World Championships	Rome, Italy	19th (h)	3000 m s'chase	8:24.32
1988	Olympic Games	Seoul, South Korea	8th	3000 m s'chase	8:15.97
1990	European Championships	Split, Yugoslavia	14th (h)	3000 m s'chase	8:24.82

^{1}Representing Europe
^{2}Did not finish in the final

== Personal bests ==
- 1500 metres – 3:38.93 (Rome 1980)
- 3000 metres – 7:47.12 (Lausanne 1985)
- 5000 metres – 13:26.09 (Nice 1980)
- 2000 metres steeplechase – 5:20.81 (Oslo 1984)
- 3000 metres steeplechase – 8:09.18 (Brussels 1984)
