= Franco Boffi =

Italian middle-distance runner

Personal information
- Nationality: Italian
- Born: 2 November 1958 (age 67) Milan, Italy
- Height: 1.86 m (6 ft 1 in)
- Weight: 70 kg (154 lb)

Sport
- Country: Italy
- Sport: Athletics
- Events: Long distance running 3000 metres steeplechase
- Club: Pro Patria Milano

Achievements and titles
- Personal best: 3000 m st: 8:21:69 (1987)
Medal record
Summer Universiade
Gold medal – first place	1985 Kobe	3000 m st

Franco Boffi (born 2 November 1958) is an Italian former middle distance runner, who won a gold medal at the Summer Universiade (1985).

== Biography ==
He competed in the 1984 Summer Olympics. He was finalist (13th) at the 1987 World Championships in Athletics, but in preliminary round, he ran his personal best of ever (8:21:69).

== Achievements ==
Year	Competition	Venue	Position	Event	Performance	Notes
1984	Olympic Games	(United States) Los Angeles	SF	3000 metres steeplechase	8:30.82	
1987	World Championships	(Italy) Rome	13th	3000 metres steeplechase	8:43.60	

== National titles ==
Franco Boffi has won 2 times the individual national championship.

- 1 win in 3000 metres steeplechase (1984)
- 1 win in 3000 metres indoor (1987)

== See also ==
- Italian all-time lists - 3000 metres steeplechase
