= Peter Koech =

Kenyan runner (born 1958)

Medal record

Men's Athletics

Representing Kenya

Olympic Games
Silver medal – second place	1988 Seoul	3000m Steeplechase

Peter Koech (born February 18, 1958) is a former long-distance runner from Kenya who won a silver medal in the 3,000 meters steeplechase event at the 1988 Summer Olympics. He held the world record in this event for over three years, running 8:05.35 in 1989. It was the first electronically timed world record for the event and is still in the top 25 performers in history.

Koech competed for the Washington State Cougars track and field team, winning an NCAA Division I title in the steeplechase.

He is from Arwos, Nandi District. He now lives in Albuquerque, New Mexico with his wife and three children. He continued to run in the Masters division, winning the Boilermaker Road Race in 1998.

== Achievements ==
Year	Competition	Venue	Position	Event	Notes
Representing Kenya
1987	All-Africa Games	Nairobi, Kenya	3rd	5000 m	13:44.94

Records
Preceded by (Kenya) Henry Rono	Men's Steeplechase World Record Holder; July 3, 1989 — August 19, 1992	Succeeded by (Kenya) Moses Kiptanui
Sporting positions
Preceded by (Kenya) Julius Kariuki	Men's 3,000 m Steeple Best Year Performance; 1989 — 1990	Succeeded by (Kenya) Moses Kiptanui
