= Henry Marsh (runner) =

American track athlete

Personal information
- Full name: Henry Dinwoodey Marsh
- Born: Henry Dinwoodey Marsh; March 15, 1954 (age 72) Boston, Massachusetts, U.S.
- Education: Punahou High School
- Height: 178 cm (5 ft 10 in)
- Weight: 72 kg (159 lb)
- Spouse: Suzi Wallin

Sport
- Country: United States
- Sport: Track and field
- Rank: 1st-World (1981, 1982, 1985); Top 10-World (1977-1988)
- Event: 3000 m steeplechase
- University team: Brigham Young University Cougars
- Club: Athletics West
- Coached by: Alan Hazzard "Al" Rowan and Clarence Robison

Achievements and titles
- Personal bests: 1500m – 3:43.52 (1985); Mile – 3:59.31 (1985); 2 miles – 8:33.90i (1984); 5000m – 13:45.2 (1984); 3000m steeplechase – 8:09.17 (1985)
Medal record
Representing the United States
Olympic Games
Pan American Games
| Gold medal – first place | 1979 San Juan | 3000m steeplechase |
| Silver medal – second place | 1987 Indianapolis | 3000m steeplechase |
World Cup
| Silver medal – second place | 1985 Canberra | 3000m steeplechase |
Goodwill Games
| Silver medal – second place | 1986 Moscow | 3000m steeplechase |

Henry Dinwoodey Marsh (born March 15, 1954) is a retired runner from the United States, who made four U.S. Olympic teams and represented his native country in the men's 3,000 meter Steeplechase in three Summer Olympics, from 1976 through 1988.

== Biography ==
=== Junior high school ===
Marsh's athletic career started in Richardson, Texas at Northwood Junior High School, where he started as a quarterback for an unsuccessful football team. He had more success with the track and field team that next spring.

=== High School ===
Marsh moved to Hawai'i, in both years at Punahou High School, he was the state champ in the mile with a personal best of 4:18:6 and was the co-captain his senior year. He was inducted into the Punahou Hall of Fame in 1990.

=== College ===
Marsh went to Brigham Young University in Provo, Utah. After his freshman year, he took 2 years off, in Brazil, when he came back he qualified for the NCAAs with 8:55. Then he broke the BYU record when he ran 8:27 at the NCAAs and subsequently qualified for the 1976 Olympic trials. At the NCAAs he was 2nd in 1976 and 3rd in 1977 and 1978. He was an All-American five times. In 1978, he also won the national title.

Marsh had the second longest lasting (most enduring) running record in BYU history. (The most enduring running record belongs to Ralph Mann, who set a record in the 400-meter dash in 1970 and has yet to be broken.) Marsh's BYU record of 8:21.60, set in 1977, in the 3,000-meter steeplechase lasted 46 years, before Kenneth Rooks broke the steeplechase record with a time of 8:17.62 on May 8, 2023.

=== Olympics ===
==== 1976 Montréal Olympics ====
In 1976, while a sophomore at BYU, Marsh qualified for the 1976 Summer Olympics in Montréal, Québec, Canada, at the Olympics he got tenth place with 8:23.99.

==== 1980 Moscow Olympics ====
Marsh qualified for the 1980 US Olympic team but was unable to compete due to the 1980 Summer Olympics boycott. He did however receive one of 461 Congressional Gold Medals created especially for the spurned athletes. Track & Field News ranked him the number one steeplechaser in the world for 1981, 1982, and 1985. Moreover, he was world ranked (i.e., top 10) in this event for 12 consecutive years, 1977-1988. Marsh broke the American Record for the steeplechase on four occasions: 8:21.55 (July 5, 1977), 8:15.68 (June 28, 1980), 8:12.37 (August 17, 1983), and 8:09.17 (August 28, 1985); the last mark lasted almost 21 years until Daniel Lincoln ran 8:08.82 in Rome on July 14, 2006.

==== 1984 Los Angeles Olympics ====
During the 1984 Olympic Games, Marsh entered the event with a #2 world ranking. On race day for the 3,000 meter steeplechase finals, Marsh finished fourth (losing out on the bronze medal to teammate Brian Diemer by only 0.19 seconds), then collapsed to the track and was carried out of the Los Angeles Memorial Coliseum on a gurney.

==== 1988 Seoul Olympics ====
Marsh won with 8:34:74 in his last 3,000 meter steeplechase race in the United States for the Prefontaine Classic at Hayward Field in Eugene, Oregon, coming from behind, passing Kregg Einspahr at the final hurdle for the win, before heading to Seoul, South Korea for the Olympics. He placed 6th with 8:14:39 in the 3,000-Meter steeplechase at the 1988 Summer Olympics, then he retired from racing. This was his fourth Olympic Games and he was ranked in the top 10 in the world for 12 years, much of the time at number one, but never earned an Olympic medal.

=== Pan American Games ===
At Pan American Games, Marsh won a gold medal in 1979 and a silver medal in 1987.

=== Goodwill Games ===
Marsh won a silver medal in the 3,000-meter steeplechase at the 1986 Goodwill Games in Moscow, Soviet Union.

=== World Cups ===
In 1979, Marsh came in 4th place at the 1979 IAAF World Cup in Montréal, Québec, Canada.

In 1981, he originally won, but was disqualified for failing to clear the penultimate water jump at the 1981 IAAF World Cup in Rome, Italy.

In 1985, he won a silver medal at the 1985 IAAF World Cup in Canberra, Australian Capital Territory, Australia.

=== World Championships ===
In 1983, placed 8th in the first-ever World Championships in Helsinki, Finland.

In 1987, placed 6th in the second World Championships in Rome, Italy.

== Honors, awards, records and accolades ==
Marsh was the American champion in the steeplechase nine times (1978, 1979, 1981–1987) and in 1983 received the Glenn Cunningham Award as the best distance runner in America. He has been considered as one of the best steeplechase runners in American history. In the 1970s and 1980s, he was the greatest steeplechase runner in the United States of America. In 1998, he became an Honoree (was inducted) into the Utah Sports Hall of Fame. In 2001, he was inducted into the U.S. Track and Field Hall of Fame.

== Accomplishing life-long goal/dream ==
Marsh was only two months old when Roger Bannister became the first person to run a mile, in less than four minutes, doing it in 3:59.4. A feat that scientists tried to prove that it could not be done; that is why it was so important to Marsh to run a sub-4-minute mile. Marsh had stopped running mile races and focused on the 3,000-meter steeplechase at BYU; this is why it was so late in his running/racing career that he finally set out to do this elite feat. In 1985, at the age of 31, near the end of his racing career, he joined the sub-4 minute group of milers with a 3:59.31 run at Bern, Switzerland on August 16, becoming the oldest person to run his first sub-four minute mile.

== In popular culture ==
In March 1986, Marsh was featured in "16 Days of Glory", a documentary about the 1984 Summer Olympics, in Los Angeles, California. To view the show on YouTube, select this link.

== Racing style ==
Marsh was known for starting races in back with the pack and come-from-behind fantastic finishes. When Kenneth Rooks (a fellow BYU Cougar and 3,000-meter steeplechaser), fell on the 8th of July, 2023, in Eugene, Oregon, he told himself to go into "Henry Marsh mode". Rooks also said that he was surprised how well he was able to execute his "Marsh Strategy" as he ran personal best 8.16.78 and won the race.

== Post-racing career ==
After graduating with a law degree, Marsh worked for a prominent Salt Lake City law firm, for 3.5 years before deciding that he didn't want to practice law anymore.

== Philanthropy ==
Marsh was a guest speaker at the "Gorge-Us Getaway", along with national director of BSA public affairs, Julian Dyke, and Orrin Hatch, United States Senator, to 5,000 Boy Scouts, to promote Utah National Parks. He has also given free nutrition and fitness seminars together with the director of the Human Performance Research Center at Brigham Young University, Dr. A. Garth Fisher.

== Personal life ==
Marsh is married to Suzi Wallin, and they have at least two children: Jimmy and Danielle Dorothy. Marsh was a co-founder of MonaVie, a multi-level marketing (MLM) company that folded in 2015. He served as executive vice-president and later as the company's Vice Chairman of the Board. According to Forbes, MonaVie's business plan resembled a pyramid scheme. He is a member of The Church of Jesus Christ of Latter-day Saints, and he was their second member to qualify for 4 Olympic Games. He spent two years on mission in Brazil. He was one of three return missionaries to participate in the 1988 Summer Olympics along with Doug Padilla and Ed Eyestone, and commented at a church fireside meeting in Seoul, South Korea, that if he had not gone on a mission that he would have never participated in any Olympic Games. In 2008, the Sacramento Bee noted that Marsh was a major financial supporter (two donations totalling $90,000) of Proposition 8, a California ballot initiative to eliminate same-sex marriage rights. He moved to Twin Falls, Idaho, for his retirement.

== Achievements ==
All results regarding 3000 metres steeplechase.

- 9-time US Champion 1978-1979, 1981-1987 (2nd in 1980)
- 2-time US Olympic Trials winner 1980 & 1984 (2nd in 1976 & 1988)

Representing United States
| Year | Tournament | Venue | Result | Time |
|---|---|---|---|---|
| 1976 | Olympic Games | Montreal, Quebec, Canada | 10th | 8:23.99 |
| 1979 | Pan American Games | San Juan, Puerto Rico | 1st | 8:43.6 |
| 1979 | World Cup | Montreal, Canada | 4th | 8:30.09 |
| 1981 | World Cup | Rome, Italy | DISQ | (8:19.61) |
| 1983 | World Championships | Helsinki, Finland | 8th | 8:20.45 |
| 1984 | Olympic Games | Los Angeles, California, United States | 4th | 8:14.25 |
| 1985 | World Cup | Canberra, Australia | 2nd | 8:39.55 |
| 1986 | Goodwill Games | Moscow, Russia | 2nd | 8:23.92 |
| 1987 | Pan American Games | Indianapolis, United States | 2nd | 8:23.77 |
| 1987 | World Championships | Rome, Italy | 6th | 8:17.78 |
| 1988 | Olympic Games | Seoul, South Korea | 6th | 8:14.39 |

Notes:
- Marsh originally won the 1981 World Cup title but was disqualified for failing to clear the penultimate water jump.
- The US Olympic trials of 1976-1988, were a separate event from the US Championships.

Sporting positions
| Preceded by (Italy) Mariano Scartezzini | Men's 3.000m Steeple Best Year Performance; 1982 — 1983 | Succeeded by (France) Joseph Mahmoud |
| Preceded by (France) Joseph Mahmoud | Men's 3.000m Steeple Best Year Performance; 1985 | Succeeded by (Belgium) William Van Dijck |
