= Juan José Torres (athlete) =

Spanish middle-distance runner

Personal information
- Nationality: Spanish
- Born: 26 November 1957 (age 68)

Sport
- Sport: Middle-distance running
- Event: Steeplechase

Juan José Torres (born 26 November 1957) is a Spanish middle-distance runner. He competed in the men's 3000 metres steeplechase at the 1984 Summer Olympics.
