= José Regalo =

Portuguese long-distance runner

Personal information
- Full name: José Alberto Teixeira Regalo
- Nationality: Portuguese
- Born: 22 November 1963 (age 62)

Sport
- Sport: Long-distance running
- Event: 5000 metres

José Alberto Teixeira Regalo (born 22 November 1963) is a Portuguese long-distance runner. He competed in the men's 5000 metres at the 1988 Summer Olympics.
