= Domingo Ramón =

Spanish middle-distance runner

Personal information
- Nationality: Spanish
- Born: 10 March 1958 (age 68) Crevillente, Spain
- Height: 1.62 m (5 ft 4 in)
- Weight: 57 kg (126 lb)

Sport
- Sport: Athletics
- Event: 3000 m steeplechase
- Club: CA Hércules-Benacantil

Achievements and titles
- Personal best: 3000 m st. – 8:15.74 (1980)
Medal record
Men's Athletics
Representing Spain
European Championships
Bronze medal – third place	1982 Athens	3000 m steeplechase
IAAF World Cross Country Championships
Silver medal – second place	1977 Düsseldorf	Junior men's 7.5K
European Junior Championships
Silver medal – second place	1977 Donetsk	2000 m steeplechase
Mediterranean Games
Silver medal – second place	1979 Split	3000 m steeplechase
Silver medal – second place	1983 Casablanca	3000 m steeplechase
Ibero-American Championships
Gold medal – first place	1983 Barcelona	3000 m steeplechase

Domingo Jesús Ramón Menargues (born March 10, 1958, in Crevillente, Alicante) is a retired long-distance runner from Spain, known for winning the bronze medal in the men's 3000 m steeplechase event at the 1982 European Championships in Athens, Greece. He represented his native country in two Summer Olympics (1980 and 1984). Ramón set his personal best (8:15.74) in the event on July 21, 1980, at the 1980 Summer Olympics in Moscow.

He was twice a competitor at the World Championships in Athletics, in 1983 and 1987, and was also a four-time champion of Spain in the 3000 m steeplechase, in 1980 (8:29.40), 1981 (8:21.09), 1982 (8:27.07), and 1984 (8:29.91).

Ramón won the British AAA Championships title in the steeplechase event at the 1984 AAA Championships.

== Competition record ==
Year	Competition	Venue	Position	Event	Notes
Representing Spain
1979	Mediterranean Games	Split, Yugoslavia	2nd	3000 m s'chase	8:25.75
1980	Olympic Games	Moscow, Soviet Union	4th	3000 m s'chase	8:15.74
1982	European Championships	Athens, Greece	3rd	3000 m s'chase	8:20.48
1983	World Championships	Helsinki, Finland	10th	3000 m s'chase	8:21.32
1983	Mediterranean Games	Casablanca, Morocco	2nd	3000 m s'chase	8:19.60
1983	Ibero-American Championships	Barcelona, Spain	1st	3000 m s'chase	8:27.20
1984	Olympic Games	Los Angeles, United States	6th	3000 m s'chase	8:17.27
