= Brendan Quinn =

Irish middle-distance runner

Personal information
- Nationality: Irish
- Born: 26 July 1960 (age 65)
- Height: 188 cm (6 ft 2 in)
- Weight: 73 kg (161 lb)

Sport
- Sport: Middle-distance running
- Event: Steeplechase

Brendan Quinn (born 26 July 1960) is an Irish middle-distance runner. He competed in the men's 3000 metres steeplechase at the 1988 Summer Olympics.

Quinn finished third behind American Brian Diemer in the steeplechase event at the British 1985 AAA Championships.
