= Julius Korir =

Kenyan athlete

Personal information
- Born: 21 April 1960 (age 66) Nandi, Kenya
Medal record
Men's athletics
Representing Kenya
Olympic Games
Gold medal – first place	1984 Los Angeles	3000 m st.
African Championships
Silver medal – second place	1982 Cairo	3000 m st.
Commonwealth Games
Gold medal – first place	1982 Brisbane	3000 m st.

Julius Korir (born 21 April 1960) is a former Kenyan athlete, who won the 3.000 m steeplechase at the 1984 Summer Olympics.

Korir was born in Nandi, Kenya. He rose into the international athletics scene in 1982, when he surprisingly won the gold medal at the Commonwealth Games. Korir improved his times during the 1983 season, but finished only seventh at the first World Championships. He continued to improve in 1984 and, after winning his semi-final at the 1984 Summer Olympics, established himself as a serious medal contender for the gold medal. In the Olympic final, Korir was always with the leaders, and when he started his sprint for home with just over half a lap remaining, the rest of the field were unable to match his speed.

Korir missed the 1985 season due to injury, and although he competed for several more years, he never again represented his country at a major international championships. He fell during training and had bruises on his chest and right leg muscle pain, so he did not enter the Kenyan trials for the 1988 Summer Olympics.

Running for the Washington State Cougars, he won the 1984 NCAA Division I Outdoor Track and Field Championships title in the 5000 m, and the 1986 NCAA Division I Outdoor Track and Field Championships title in the 3000 m steeplechase.

== Achievements ==
Year	Competition	Venue	Position	Event	Notes
Representing Kenya
1982	African Championships	Cairo, Egypt	2nd	3000 m steeple	8:32.20
