= Pascal Debacker =

French middle-distance runner

Personal information
- Nationality: French
- Born: 8 April 1960 (age 66)

Sport
- Sport: Middle-distance running
- Event: Steeplechase

Pascal Debacker (born 8 April 1960) is a French middle-distance runner. He competed in the men's 3000 metres steeplechase at the 1984 Summer Olympics.
