= Peter Daenens =

Belgian middle-distance runner (born 1960)

Personal information
- Born: 23 November 1960 (age 65) Bruges, Belgium

Sport
- Sport: Track and field
Medal record
Representing Belgium
Summer Universiade
Gold medal – first place	1983 Edmonton	3000m steeplechase

Peter Daenens (born 23 November 1960) is a Belgian former middle distance runner who competed in the 1984 Summer Olympics.
