= Colin Reitz =

English track athlete (born 1960)

Personal information
- Nationality: British (English)
- Born: 6 April 1960 (age 66) Clapton, London, England
- Height: 186 cm (6 ft 1 in)
- Weight: 73 kg (161 lb)

Sport
- Sport: Athletics
- Event: 3000 m steeplechase
- Club: Newham & Essex Beagles

Achievements and titles
- Personal best: 8:12.11 (1986)
Medal record
Men's Athletics
Representing Great Britain
World Championships
Bronze medal – third place	1983 Helsinki	3000m steeplechase
Representing England
Commonwealth Games
Bronze medal – third place	1986 Edinburgh	3000m steeplechase

Colin Robert Reitz (born 6 April 1960) is a male English former track athlete who competed mainly in the 3000 metres steeplechase and participated at the 1980 Summer Olympics and the 1984 Summer Olympics.

== Biography ==
Born in Clapton, London, Reitz finished third behind Steve Ovett in the 1 mile event at the 1980 AAA Championships. Shortly afterwards at the 1980 Olympics Games in Moscow, he represented Great Britain in the 3,000 metres steeplechase, where he was eliminated in the semifinals.

He represented England in the 1,500 metres and 3,000 metres steeplechase events, at the 1982 Commonwealth Games in Brisbane, Australia.

In 1983, Reitz became the British 3000m steeplechase champion after winning the British AAA Championships title at the 1983 AAA Championships. He also went on to win the bronze medal in the 3000m steeplechase at the inaugural World Championships in Helsinki.

At the 1984 Los Angeles Olympics he finished fifth in the final. In July 1986, he won a bronze medal at the Commonwealth Games in Edinburgh, Scotland, before finishing fourth at the European Championships in August. He set his personal best in the steeplechase with 8:12.11 on 5 September 1986 at a meet in Brussels. His final major competition was the 1987 World Championships, where he was eliminated in the heats.

In the Track and Field News world merit rankings, he ranked in the top 10 three times; in 1983 (#4), 1984 (#6) and 1986 (#7).

== International competitions ==
All results regarding 3000m steeplechase unless stated.

Year	Competition	Venue	Position	Notes
Representing Great Britain / England
1980	Olympic Games	Moscow, Soviet Union	15th (s)	8:29.8
1982	European Championships	Athens, Greece	10th	8:28.87
1982	Commonwealth Games	Brisbane, Australia	6th	3:44.35 (1500 m)
1982	Commonwealth Games	Brisbane, Australia	8th	8:41.94
1983	World Championships	Helsinki, Finland	3rd	8:17.75
1984	Olympic Games	Los Angeles, United States	5th	8:15.48
1986	Commonwealth Games	Edinburgh, Scotland	3rd	8:26.14
1986	European Championships	Stuttgart, Germany	4th	8:18.12
1987	World Championships	Rome, Italy	28th (h)	8:40.55

(#) Indicates overall position achieved in the semis (s) or heats (h).
