= Peter Renner =

Olympic steeplechase runner

Peter Campbell Renner (born 27 October 1959) is a retired New Zealand track and field athlete from Mosgiel, New Zealand who mostly competed in the 3000 metres steeplechase. Renner competed at the 1984 Summer Olympics in Los Angeles and the 1982, 1986 and 1990 Commonwealth Games and holds the national and Oceania record of 8:14.05 for the 3000m Steeplechase.

Renner is a New Zealand national champion in the marathon. He won the 1990 California International Marathon in a time of 2:12:35.

== Achievements ==
Year	Competition	Venue	Position	Notes
Representing New Zealand
1990	California International Marathon	California State Capitol, United States	1st	Marathon

== Personal bests ==
Distance	Time	Place	Date
3000 m Steeplechase	8:14.05 NR	Koblenz	1984

== Honours and awards ==
In 1990, Renner was awarded the New Zealand 1990 Commemoration Medal.

Sporting positions
Preceded by (United States) Budd Coates	California International Marathon – Men's winner 1990	Succeeded by (Canada) Bruce Deacon
