= Ramón López (runner) =

Paraguayan long-distance runner

Personal information
- Nationality: Paraguayan
- Born: 6 June 1963 (age 63)
- Height: 1.73 m (5 ft 8 in)
- Weight: 61 kg (134 lb)

Sport
- Sport: Long-distance running
- Events: 5000 metres, 10,000 metres

Ramón López (born 6 June 1963) is a Paraguayan long-distance runner. He competed at the 1984 Summer Olympics and the 1988 Summer Olympics.
