= Hans Koeleman =

Dutch runner (born 1957)

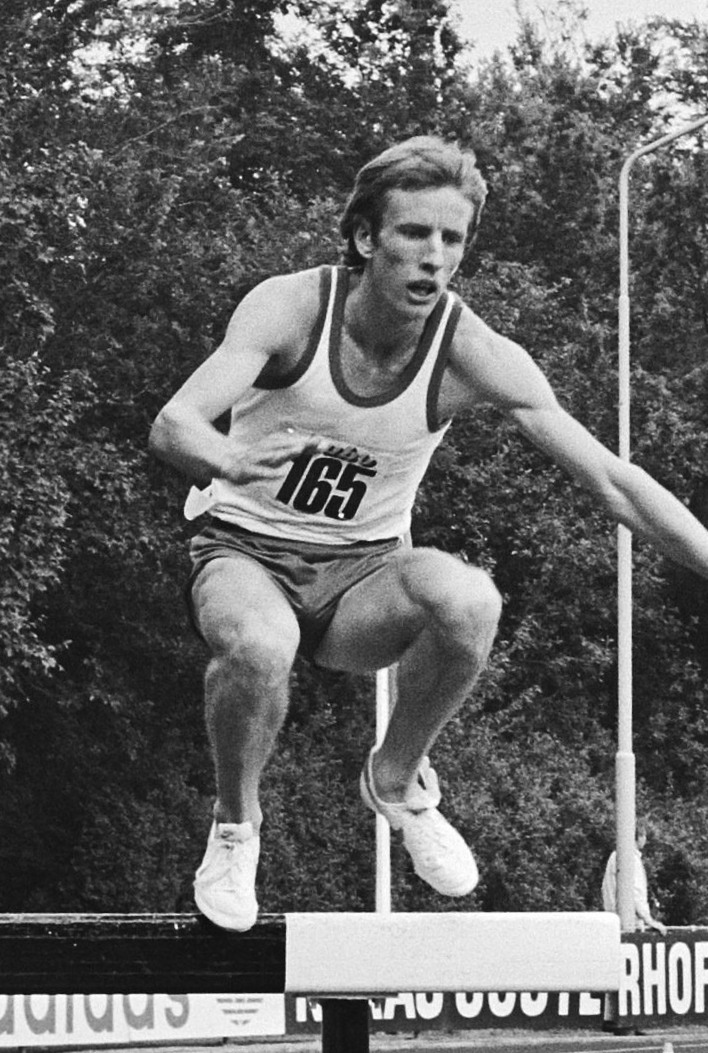
- Hans Koeleman winning the national steeplechase title in 1980

Personal information
- Born: 5 October 1957 (age 68) Uithoorn, the Netherlands
- Height: 1.81 m (5 ft 11 in)
- Weight: 67 kg (148 lb)

Sport
- Sport: Steeplechase
- Club: AAC, Amsterdam
Medal record
Representing the Netherlands
Summer Universiade
Bronze medal – third place	1985 Kobe	3000 m

Johannes Cornelis Maria "Hans" Koeleman (born 5 October 1957) is a retired Dutch middle- and long-distance runner. He competed in the steeplechase at the 1984 and 1988 Summer Olympics, but failed to reach the finals. In this event he won a medal at every national championship between 1977 and 1988.

Koeleman was a four-time All-American for the Clemson Tigers track and field team in the mile run, 3000 metres flat, and 3000 m steeplechase.

Awards
Preceded by Gerard Nijboer	Herman van Leeuwen Cup; 1981	Succeeded by Gerard Nijboer
