= Tommy Ekblom =

Finnish long-distance runner

Personal information
- Born: 20 September 1959 (age 66) Porvoo, Uusimaa, Finland

Sport
- Sport: Track and field
Medal record
Representing Finland
Summer Universiade
Silver medal – second place	1981 Bucharest	3000m steeplechase

Tommy Uolevi Ekblom (born 20 September 1959) is a retired long-distance runner from Finland. He twice competed for his native country at the 1980 Summer Olympics and 1984 Summer Olympics in the men's 3000 metres steeplechase. Ekblom set his personal best (8.19.40) in that event in 1983. He also coached Jukka Keskisalo, another Finnish steeplechaser, who became the European Champion in 2006.
