= Roger Hackney =

Welsh long-distance runner (born 1957)

Personal information
- Nationality: British (Welsh)
- Born: 2 September 1957 (age 68) Swansea, Wales
- Height: 1.83 m (6 ft 0 in)
- Weight: 74 kg (163 lb)

Sport
- Sport: Athletics
- Event: Steeplechase
- Club: Aldershot, Farnham & District AC; Farnborough; Royal Air Force
Medal record
Men's athletics
Representing Wales
Commonwealth Games
Silver medal – second place	1986 Edinburgh	3000 m steeplechase

Roger Graham Hackney (born 2 September 1957) is a Welsh former long-distance runner who specialised in the 3000 metres steeplechase. He represented Great Britain in three Olympic Games and won a silver medal for Wales at the 1986 Commonwealth Games.

== Biography ==
Hackney, who was a member of the Royal Air Force, and trained at Aldershot, Farnham and District AC, specialised in the 3000m steeplechase. Hackney was twice the British 3000 metres steeplechase champion after winning the British AAA Championships title at the 1980 AAA Championships and the 1982 AAA Championships.

He made his Olympics debut as a 22-year old at the 1980 Moscow Games and was seventh in his semi-final, only just missing out on a spot in the final, with the next best time of the competitors that missed out.

At the 1983 World Championships in Helsinki, Hackney came fifth in the final of the steeplechase.

His best performance in the Olympics came at the 1984 Los Angeles Games where he ran the semi-final in 8:20.77 and qualified for the final, in which he finished 10th.

He won a silver medal representing Wales in the steeplechase at the 1986 Commonwealth Games, in a time of 8:25.15, behind Canada's Graeme Fell and ahead of Colin Reitz, another British athlete. The field was weakened by the absence of many African countries, most notably Kenya, which boycotted the competition over the Thatcher government's sporting links with apartheid South Africa. In 1986 he was also eighth at the European Championships.

He was part of the Great British Olympic team for a third and final time at the 1988 Seoul Games. By then aged 31, Hackney once more made it to the semi-final stage, but was unable to complete the race and didn't register a time.

His personal best time, 8:18.91, is a Welsh record and was set in 1988, while competing in Belgium. He is the only non Belgian man to win the Lotto Cross Cup.

He now works in Leeds as an orthopaedic surgeon.

== International competitions ==
All results regarding 3000 metres steeplechase unless stated otherwise.

Year	Competition	Venue	Position	Notes
Representing Great Britain / Wales
1979	World Cross Country Championships (12 km)	Limerick, Ireland	153rd	41:17
1980	World Cross Country Championships (12.58 km)	Paris, France	62nd	38:43
1980	Olympic Games	Moscow, Soviet Union	13th (h)	8:29.2
1981	World Cross Country Championships (12 km)	Madrid, Spain	126th	37:17
1982	World Cross Country Championships (12 km)	Rome, Italy	103rd	36:06
1982	European Championships	Athens, Greece	21st (h)	8:39.22
1982	Commonwealth Games	Brisbane, Australia	4th	8:32.84
1982	Commonwealth Games	Brisbane, Australia	11th	13:51.20 (5000 m)
1983	World Championships	Helsinki, Finland	5th	8:19.38
1984	Olympic Games	Los Angeles, United States	10th	8:27.10
1986	Commonwealth Games	Edinburgh, United Kingdom	2nd	8:25.15
1986	European Championships	Stuttgart, Germany	8th	8:20.97
1987	World Championships	Rome, Italy	14th	8:48.86
1988	World Cross Country Championships (12 km)	Auckland, New Zealand	13th	35:59
1988	Olympic Games	Seoul, South Korea	DNF (sf)	8:39.30 ((heats)
1989	World Cross Country Championships (12 km)	Stavanger, Norway	DNF	—
1990	Commonwealth Games	Auckland, New Zealand	7th	8:36.62
1990	Commonwealth Games	Auckland, New Zealand	14th	14:27.06 (5000 m)
(#) Indicates overall position in qualifying heats (h) or semifinals (sf). DNF = did not finish
