= Francesco Panetta =

Italian long-distance runner

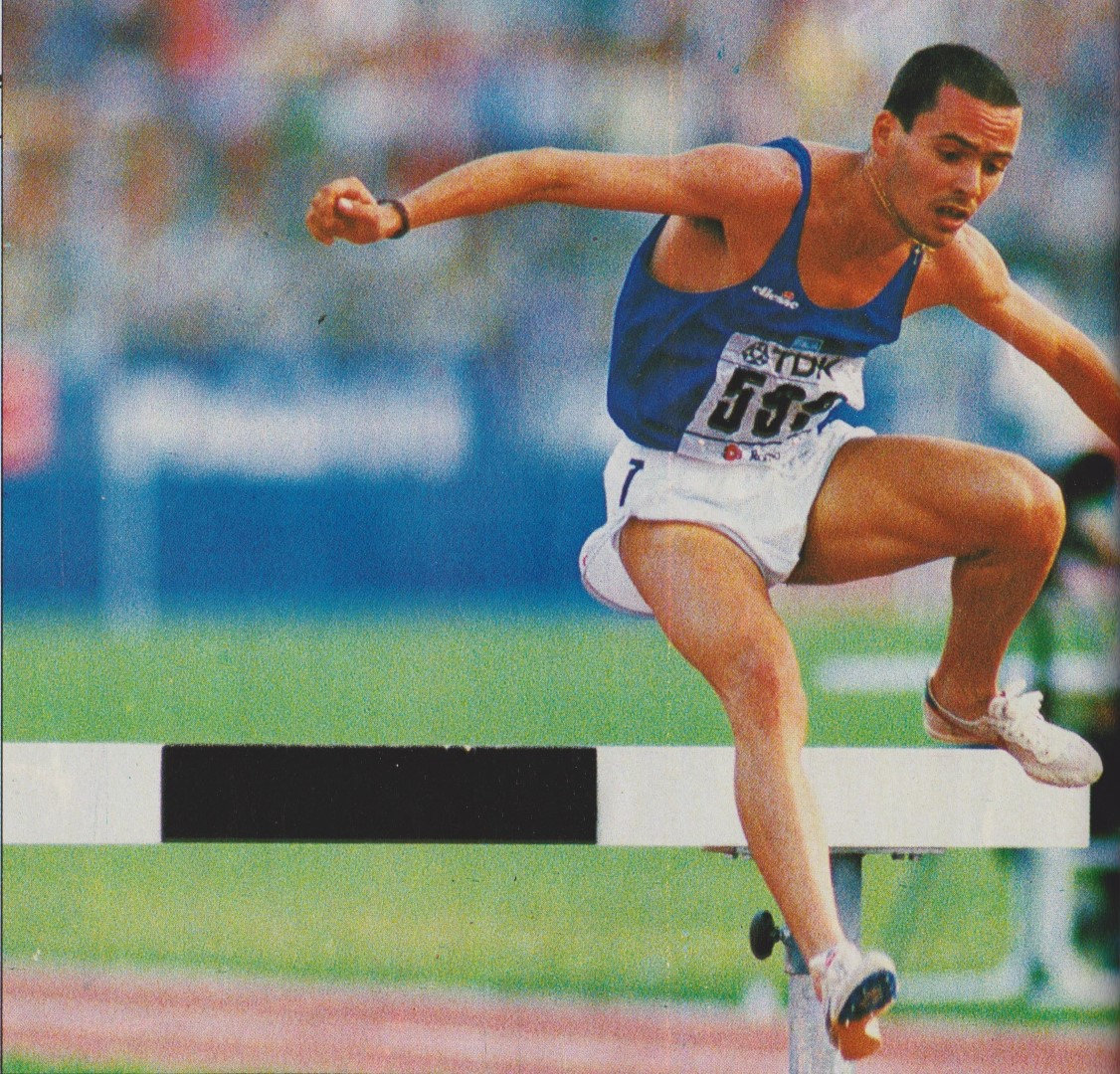

Personal information
- Nationality: Italian
- Born: 10 January 1963 (age 63) Siderno, Italy
- Height: 1.75 m (5 ft 9 in)
- Weight: 64 kg (141 lb)

Sport
- Country: Italy
- Sport: Athletics
- Event(s): Long distance running Steeplechase
- Club: Pro Patria Milano
- Coached by: Giorgio Rondelli

Achievements and titles
- Personal bests: 3000 m st: 8:08.57 (1987); 5000 m: 13:06.76 (1994); 10000 m: 27:24.16 (1989)
Medal record
Men's athletics
Representing Italy
| Event | 1st | 2nd | 3rd |
|---|---|---|---|
| World Championships | 1 | 1 | 0 |
| European Championships | 1 | 1 | 0 |
| European Cup | 3 | 3 | 0 |
World Championships
| Gold medal – first place | 1987 Rome | 3000m st. |
| Silver medal – second place | 1987 Rome | 10,000 m |
European Championships
| Gold medal – first place | 1990 Split | 3000 m st. |
| Silver medal – second place | 1986 Stuttgart | 3000 m st. |

Francesco Panetta (born 10 January 1963 in Siderno) is a former Italian long-distance runner, who won several medals at international championships in the 1980s.

== Career ==
Panetta's greatest achievement was the victory at the 1987 World Championships in the 3000m steeplechase in Rome.

In the previous year Panetta won a silver medal at the 1986 European Championships in Stuttgart, only narrowly losing to the East German runner Hagen Melzer.

At the 1988 Olympic Games, Panetta finished ninth in the 3000m steeplechase.

Panetta won a gold medal in the 3000m steeplechase at the 1990 European Championships in Split.

Throughout his career, Panetta set several Italian records (including 3000m and 10000m). In 1987 he ran the 3000m steeplechase in 8:08.57 min which is the current Italian national record.

== See also ==
- Italian all-time top lists - 3000 metres steeplechase
- Italian all-time top lists - 5000 metres
- Italian all-time top lists - 10000 metres
- FIDAL Hall of Fame

Sporting positions
| Preceded by William Van Dijck | Men's Steeple Best Year Performance; 1987 | Succeeded by Julius Kariuki |
