= Graeme Fell =

British steeplechase runner (born 1959)

Personal information
- Nationality: British/Canadian
- Born: 19 March 1959 (age 67) Dagenham, Essex, England
- Height: 190 cm (6 ft 3 in)
- Weight: 75 kg (165 lb)

Sport
- Sport: Athletics
- Event: steeplechase
- Club: Essex Beagles; Vancouver/Richmond Kajaks
Medal record
Men's athletics
Commonwealth Games
Representing Canada
Gold medal – first place	1986 Edinburgh	3000 m steeplechase
Bronze medal – third place	1994 Victoria	3000 m steeplechase
Representing England
Silver medal – second place	1982 Brisbane	3000 m steeplechase

Graeme Vincent Fell (born 19 March 1959) is a male former 3000 metres steeplechase runner who competed at the 1988 Summer Olympics and 1992 Summer Olympics.

== Biography ==
Fell, a member of the Essex Beagles, finished second behind American Ken Martin in the steeplechase event at the 1981 AAA Championships but by virtue of being the highest placed British athlete was considered the British 3000 metres steeplechase champion

Fell competed for England at the Commonwealth Games in Australia, winning a silver medal in the 3000 m steeplechase behind Julius Korir of Kenya.

In 1984, he took Canadian citizenship and competed for Canada at both the 1986 and 1994 Commonwealth Games (winning gold and bronze medals in the 3000m steeplechase). He also competed in two Olympics for Canada, in 1988 in Seoul (where he finished 11th in the steeplechase final) and in 1992 in Barcelona. In 1985, in Koblenz, he ran a personal best in the 3000 m steeplechase of 8:12.58, which stood as the Canadian national record for the event until 2013, when the record was broken by Matthew Hughes.

In 1985, he was a co-founder of the Vancouver Sun Run which he won twice in 1986 and 1987. In 2004, he was inducted into the British Columbia Sports Hall of Fame. He currently resides in Vancouver and coaches middle and long distance running. He also currently teaches grade six and seven students at Sir William Osler Elementary School. He teaches physical education, english, math, science and writing. In his debut marathon, Graeme Fell won the 1994 California International Marathon in a time of 2:16:13.

== Achievements ==
All results regarding 3000 metres steeplechase unless stated

Year	Competition	Venue	Position	Notes
Representing Great Britain / England
1982	European Championships	Athens, Greece	10th	8:34.30
1982	Commonwealth Games	Brisbane, Australia	2nd	8:26.64
1983	World Championships	Helsinki, Finland	6th	8:20.01
Representing Canada
1985	World Cup	Canberra, Australia	3rd	8:40.30
1986	Commonwealth Games	Edinburgh, Scotland	1st	8:24.49
1987	World Championships	Rome, Italy	5th	8:16.46
1988	Olympic Games	Seoul, South Korea	11th	8:21.73
1990	Commonwealth Games	Auckland, New Zealand	4th	8:27.64
1991	World Championships	Tokyo, Japan	14th	9:01.73 (fell)
1992	Olympic Games	Barcelona, Spain	28th (q)	8:50.87
1994	Goodwill Games	Saint Petersburg, Russia	4th	8:26.25
1994	Commonwealth Games	Victoria, Canada	3rd	8:23.28
1994	Commonwealth Games	Victoria, Canada	17th (q)	14:04.42 (5000 m)
1994	California International Marathon	California, United States	1st	2:16:13
1995	World Championships	Gothenburg, Sweden	14th (q)	8:24.74

(q) indicates overall position achieved in qualifying rounds.
