= Hagen Melzer =

East German athletics competitor

Medal record

Men's athletics

Representing East Germany

World Championships
Silver medal – second place	1987 Rome	3,000 m st.

European Championships
Gold medal – first place	1986 Stuttgart	3000 m st.

Hagen Melzer (born 16 June 1959, in Bautzen) is a former East German middle and long-distance runner who specialised in the 3000 m steeplechase.

He won the gold medal at the 1986 European Championships in Stuttgart. A year later he won the silver medal at the 1987 World Championships in Rome, where he set a national record at 8:10.32 minutes. This remained his career best time, and places him second on the German all-time performers list behind Damian Kallabis, who ran in 8:09.48 minutes in 1999. At the Olympic Games he finished tenth in 1988 and did not reach the final in 1992.

Melzer won seven East German national titles, in 1980, 1983 and the years 1985–1989. He represented the sports clubs SC Einheit Dresden and, after the German reunification, Dresdner SC. He won the German title in 1991 for his new club.
