= Athletics at the 1936 Summer Olympics – Men's 3000 metres steeplechase =

Men's 3000 metres steeplechase at the Games of the XI Olympiad
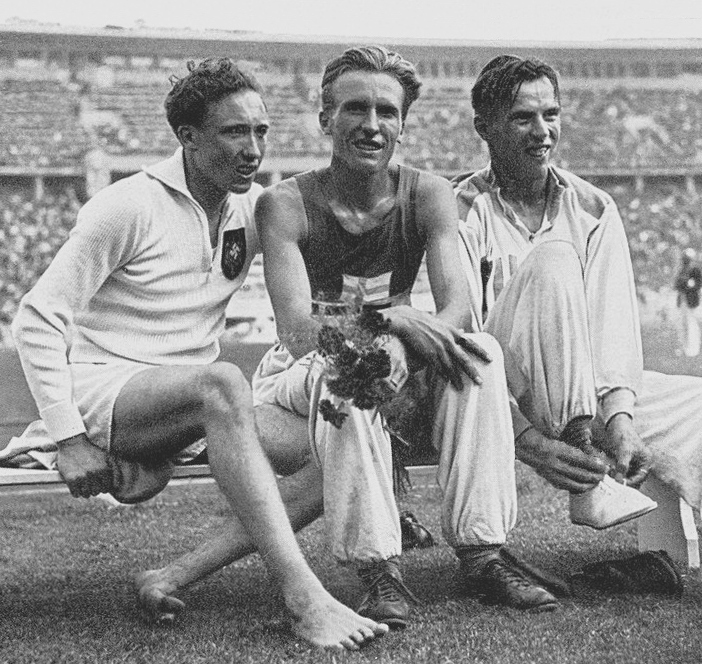
- Alfred Dompert, Volmari Iso-Hollo and Kaarlo Tuominen after the final race
- Venue: Olympiastadion: Berlin, Germany
- Dates: August 3, 1936 (heats); August 8, 1936 (final)
- Competitors: 28 from 13 nations

Medalists
1st place, gold medalist(s)		Volmari Iso-Hollo; Finland
2nd place, silver medalist(s)		Kaarlo Tuominen; Finland
3rd place, bronze medalist(s)		Alfred Dompert; Germany

The men's 3000 metres steeplechase event at the 1936 Summer Olympic Games took place August 3 and August 8. The final was won by Volmari Iso-Hollo of Finland.

== Results ==
=== Heats ===
The fastest four runners in each of the three heats advanced to the final round.

=== Heat 1 ===
Rank	Name	Nationality	Time	Notes
1	Alfred Dompert	Germany	9:27.2	
2	Martti Matilainen	Finland	9:28.4	
3	Voldemārs Vītols	Latvia	9:28.8	
4	Glen Dawson	United States	9:29.2	
5	Tom Evenson	Great Britain	9:41.2	
6	Harry Ekman	Sweden	9:43.2	
7	Bedřich Hošek	Czechoslovakia		
8	Giuseppe Lippi	Italy		
9	Roger Cuzol	France		

=== Heat 2 ===
Rank	Name	Nationality	Time	Notes
1	Volmari Iso-Hollo	Finland	9:34.0	
2	Harold Manning	United States	9:34.8	
3	Willi Heyn	Germany	9:41.2	
4	Harry Holmqvist	Sweden	9:44.4	
5	Jenő Szilágyi	Hungary	9:53.4	
6	Oscar Van Rumst	Belgium	10:05.0	
7	René Desroches	France		
8	Václav Hošek	Czechoslovakia		
9	Tetsuo Imai	Japan		

=== Heat 3 ===
Rank	Name	Nationality	Time	Notes
1	Kaarlo Tuominen	Finland	9:40.4	
2	Joe McCluskey	United States	9:45.2	
3	Roger Rérolle	France	9:50.6	
4	Lars Larsson	Sweden	9:52.4	
5	James Ginty	Great Britain	9:56.6	
6	Hideo Tanaka	Japan	10:00.4	
7	Bruno Betti	Italy		
8	Josef Hušek	Czechoslovakia		
9	Ladislaus Simacek	Austria		
	Hans Raff	Germany		DNF

=== Final ===
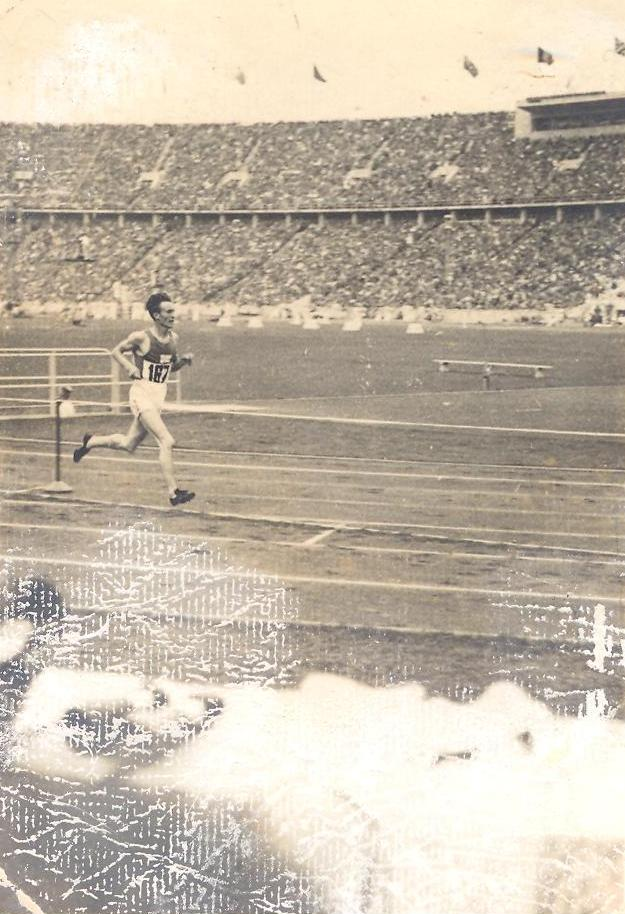
Volmari Iso-Hollo, 3000 m steeplechase, 1936 Summer Olympics

Rank	Name	Nationality	Time	Notes
1st place, gold medalist(s)	Volmari Iso-Hollo	Finland	9:03.8	WR
2nd place, silver medalist(s)	Kaarlo Tuominen	Finland	9:06.8	
3rd place, bronze medalist(s)	Alfred Dompert	Germany	9:07.2	
4	Martti Matilainen	Finland	9:09.0	
5	Harold Manning	United States	9:11.2	
6	Lars Larsson	Sweden	9:16.6	
7	Voldemārs Vītols	Latvia	9:18.8	
8	Glen Dawson	United States	9:21.1	
9	Willi Heyn	Germany	9:26.4	
10	Joe McCluskey	United States	9:29.4	
11	Roger Rérolle	France	9:40.8	
	Harry Holmqvist	Sweden		DNF

Key: DNF = Did not finish, WR = World record
