= Steeplechase at the Olympics =

3000 metres steeplechase at the Olympic Games
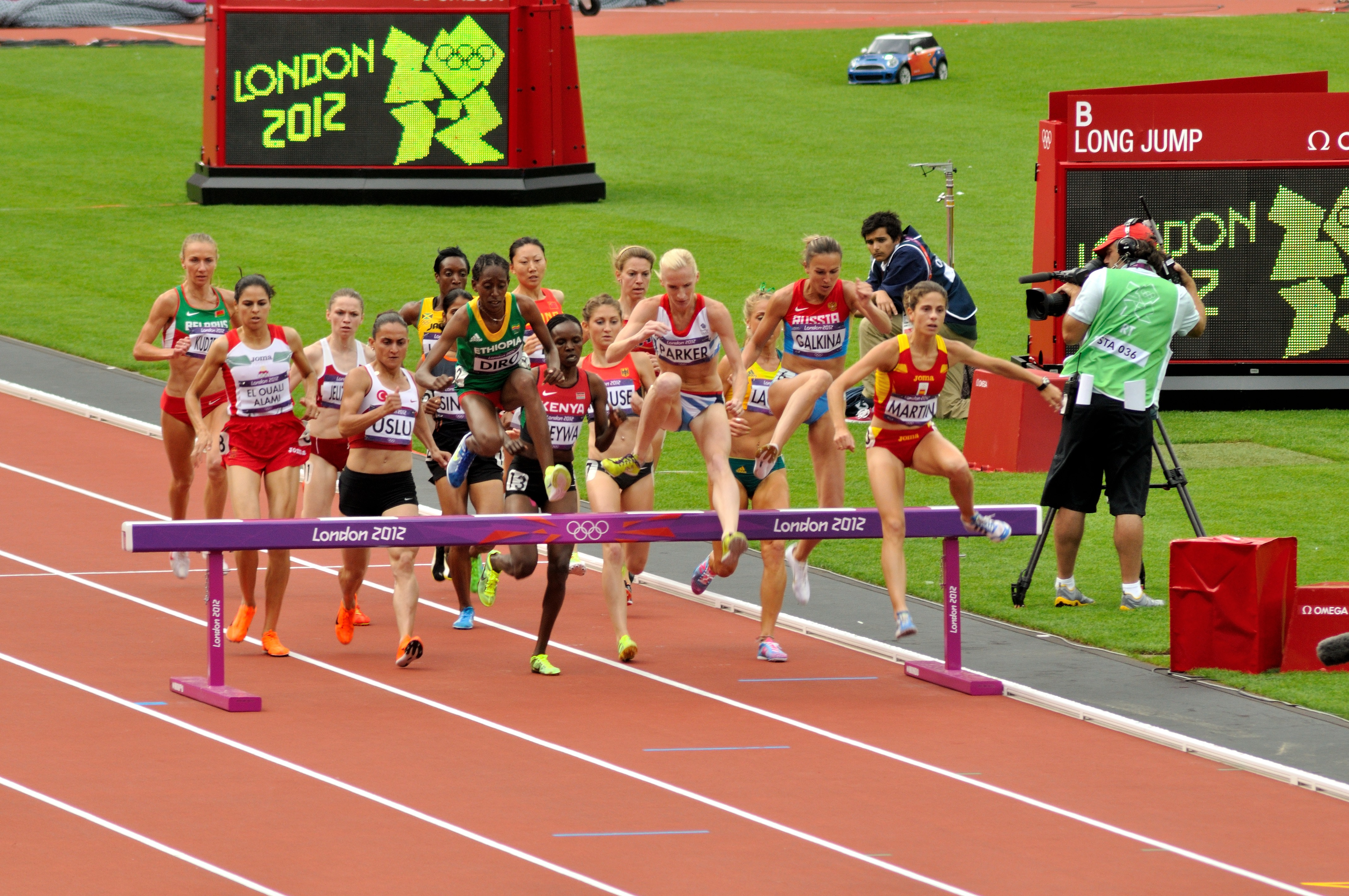
- The 2012 Olympic women's 3000 m steeplechase heats

Overview
- Sport: Athletics
- Gender: Men and women
- Years held: Men: 1920–2024; Women: 2008–2024

Olympic record
- Men: Conseslus Kipruto (KEN) 8:03.28 (2016)
- Women: Winfred Yavi (BHR) 8:52.76 (2024)

Reigning champion
- Men: Soufiane El Bakkali (MAR)
- Women: Winfred Yavi (BHR)

Kenya's Olympic success

The steeplechase at the Summer Olympics has been held over several distances and is the longest track event with obstacles held at the multi-sport event. The men's 3000 metres steeplechase has been present on the Olympic athletics programme since 1920. The women's event is the most recent addition to the programme, having been added at the 2008 Olympics. It is the most prestigious steeplechase track race at elite level.

The Olympic records for the event are 8:03.28 minutes for men, set by Conseslus Kipruto in 2016, and 8:58.81 minutes for women, set by Gulnara Galkina in 2008. The IAAF officially recognises men's steeplechase world records after 1954, but unofficial world records were set in 1928, 1936 and 1952. Anders Gärderud's time of 8:08.2 minutes from 1976 remains the only ratified men's steeplechase world record at the Olympics. Galkina's time was also a world record.

Only two athletes have won multiple Olympic steeplechase titles: Volmari Iso-Hollo (1932 and 1936), and Ezekiel Kemboi (2004 and 2012). Competitors in the steeplechase are normally event-specialists, although former champions Iso-Hollo, Ville Ritola and Kipchoge Keino all won Olympic medals in other distance running events.

In spite of not reaching the podium until 1968, Kenya is the most successful nation in the steeplechase. It has won every men's title from 1968 to 2020, with the exceptions of 1976 and 1980, which Kenya boycotted. It had medals sweeps in 1992 and 2004. Finland is the next most successful nation with four gold medals. Finland in 1928 and Sweden in 1948 also have had medal sweeps. Kenya is also the most successful nation in the developing women's event, winning three of the nine medals awarded since women started running the event in the Olympics, plus Kenyan-born and still resident, 2016 champion Ruth Jebet switched allegiance to Bahrain for financial reasons. She has been banned for doping since 2018.

== Format ==
The steeplechase made its first Olympic appearance at the 1900 Summer Olympics, which had men's races over two distances: one of 2500 metres and another of 4000 metres. The 1900 Games also held two further races over the 2500 m distance, with one for professionals only and one with a special handicap system – these are no longer considered official Olympic events. In 1904 an unusual 2590 m distance was used and this was extended to 3200 m at the 1908 edition.

By 1920, the event was standardised at 3000 metres with 28 barriers and 7 water jumps, the format in which it remains to this day. In 2008 the women's event was added to the programme, also over 3000 metres.

The men's 3000 metres steeplechase in 1932 was actually 3460 metres, due to an error in lap counting. The bell to announce the final lap failed to ring at the correct time, and so the athletes ran an extra lap of the track.

== Disqualifications ==
Runners in the steeplechase are required to vault over all barriers and water jumps, and failure to do so results in disqualification. The first such disqualification at the Olympics occurred in 1908 when British athlete Thomas Downing was disqualified for incorrectly passing around the first water jump.

As in other track events, runners are not permitted to cut inside the inner track limits as this would shorten the race distance, and any athletes who do so are disqualified. The most notable occasion of this took place at the men's 2016 event, when 2-time Olympic gold medallist Ezekiel Kemboi was disqualified for this infringement after finishing third. This promoted French athlete Mahiedine Mekhissi-Benabbad into third place, and thus made Mekhissi-Benabbad the first athlete to win three Olympic medals in the steeplechase, instead of Kemboi.

=== Doping ===
All athletes who participate in Olympic events must adhere to the World Anti-Doping Code. Since the women's event began in 2008, there have been multiple incidents of doping violations leading to retroactive disqualification.

In 2016, doping samples from the 2008 games were found and re-tested. Third place finisher Yekaterina Volkova's sample was found to contain traces of prohibited substances and she was disqualified, promoting fellow Russian Tatyana Petrova into the bronze medal position.

First place finisher in the 2012 women's steeplechase, Yuliya Zaripova of Russia, was found in 2016 to have taken banned substances and her results in athletic events from 20 July 2011 to 25 July 2013 were erased. This promoted Tunisian Habiba Ghribi to first place, and IOC Vice-President Nawal El Moutawakel awarded her with an Olympic gold medal in a special ceremony on 4 June 2016. Spanish athlete Marta Domínguez was also found to be guilty of doping violations, and was disqualified from her 12th place finish at the same event.

== Medal summary ==
=== Men ===
Games	Gold	Silver	Bronze
1920 Antwerp	Percy Hodge; Great Britain	Patrick Flynn; United States	Ernesto Ambrosini; Italy
1924 Paris	Ville Ritola; Finland	Elias Katz; Finland	Paul Bontemps; France
1928 Amsterdam	Toivo Loukola; Finland	Paavo Nurmi; Finland	Ove Andersen; Finland
1932 Los Angeles	Volmari Iso-Hollo; Finland	Thomas Evenson; Great Britain	Joe McCluskey; United States
1936 Berlin	Volmari Iso-Hollo; Finland	Kalle Tuominen; Finland	Alfred Dompert; Germany
1948 London	Tore Sjöstrand; Sweden	Erik Elmsäter; Sweden	Göte Hagström; Sweden
1952 Helsinki	Horace Ashenfelter; United States	Vladimir Kazantsev; Soviet Union	John Disley; Great Britain
1956 Melbourne	Chris Brasher; Great Britain	Sándor Rozsnyói; Hungary	Ernst Larsen; Norway
1960 Rome	Zdzisław Krzyszkowiak; Poland	Nikolay Sokolov; Soviet Union	Semyon Rzhishchin; Soviet Union
1964 Tokyo	Gaston Roelants; Belgium	Maurice Herriott; Great Britain	Ivan Belyayev; Soviet Union
1968 Mexico City	Amos Biwott; Kenya	Benjamin Kogo; Kenya	George Young; United States
1972 Munich	Kipchoge Keino; Kenya	Ben Jipcho; Kenya	Tapio Kantanen; Finland
1976 Montreal	Anders Gärderud; Sweden	Bronisław Malinowski; Poland	Frank Baumgartl; East Germany
1980 Moscow	Bronisław Malinowski; Poland	Filbert Bayi; Tanzania	Eshetu Tura; Ethiopia
1984 Los Angeles	Julius Korir; Kenya	Joseph Mahmoud; France	Brian Diemer; United States
1988 Seoul	Julius Kariuki; Kenya	Peter Koech; Kenya	Mark Rowland; Great Britain
1992 Barcelona	Matthew Birir; Kenya	Patrick Sang; Kenya	William Mutwol; Kenya
1996 Atlanta	Joseph Keter; Kenya	Moses Kiptanui; Kenya	Alessandro Lambruschini; Italy
2000 Sydney	Reuben Kosgei; Kenya	Wilson Boit Kipketer; Kenya	Ali Ezzine; Morocco
2004 Athens	Ezekiel Kemboi; Kenya	Brimin Kipruto; Kenya	Paul Kipsiele Koech; Kenya
2008 Beijing	Brimin Kipruto; Kenya	Mahiedine Mekhissi-Benabbad; France	Richard Mateelong; Kenya
2012 London	Ezekiel Kemboi; Kenya	Mahiedine Mekhissi-Benabbad; France	Abel Mutai; Kenya
2016 Rio de Janeiro	Conseslus Kipruto; Kenya	Evan Jager; United States	Mahiedine Mekhissi-Benabbad; France
2020 Tokyo	Soufiane El Bakkali; Morocco	Lamecha Girma; Ethiopia	Benjamin Kigen; Kenya
2024 Paris	Soufiane El Bakkali; Morocco	Kenneth Rooks; United States	Abraham Kibiwot; Kenya
2028 Los Angeles			

==== Multiple medalists ====
Rank	Athlete	Nation	Olympics	Gold	Silver	Bronze	Total
1	Soufiane El Bakkali	Morocco	2020–2024	2	0	0	2
1	Ezekiel Kemboi	Kenya	2004–2012	2	0	0	2
1	Volmari Iso-Hollo	Finland	1932–1936	2	0	0	2
4	Bronisław Malinowski	Poland	1976–1980	1	1	0	2
4	Brimin Kipruto	Kenya	2004–2008	1	1	0	2

==== Medals by country ====
Rank	Nation	Gold	Silver	Bronze	Total
1	Kenya	11	7	6	24
2	Finland	4	3	2	9
3	Great Britain	2	2	2	6
4	Sweden	2	1	1	4
5	Poland	2	1	0	3
6	Morocco	2	0	1	3
7	United States	1	3	3	7
8	Belgium	1	0	0	1
9	France	0	3	2	5
10	Soviet Union	0	2	2	4
11	Ethiopia	0	1	1	2
12	Hungary	0	1	0	1
12	Tanzania	0	1	0	1
14	Italy	0	0	2	2
15	East Germany	0	0	1	1
15	Germany	0	0	1	1
15	Norway	0	0	1	1

=== Women ===
Games	Gold	Silver	Bronze
2008 Beijing^{[nb]}	Gulnara Samitova-Galkina; Russia	Eunice Jepkorir; Kenya	Tatyana Petrova; Russia
2012 London^{[nb2]}	Habiba Ghribi; Tunisia	Sofia Assefa; Ethiopia	Milcah Chemos Cheywa; Kenya
2016 Rio de Janeiro	Ruth Jebet; Bahrain	Hyvin Jepkemoi; Kenya	Emma Coburn; United States
2020 Tokyo	Peruth Chemutai; Uganda	Courtney Frerichs; United States	Hyvin Jepkemoi; Kenya
2024 Paris	Winfred Yavi; Bahrain	Peruth Chemutai; Uganda	Faith Cherotich; Kenya
2028 Los Angeles			

- ^{nb} Yekaterina Volkova of Russia was originally the 2008 women's steeplechase bronze medalist, but she was subsequently disqualified for doping and her teammate Arkhipova was allocated the medal.
- ^{nb2} Yuliya Zaripova of Russia was originally the 2012 women's steeplechase champion, but she was subsequently disqualified for doping. Ghribi, Sofia Assefa and Chemos were all elevated one place as a result.

==== Medalists by country ====
Rank	Nation	Gold	Silver	Bronze	Total
1	Bahrain	2	0	0	2
2	Uganda	1	1	0	2
3	Russia	1	0	1	2
4	Tunisia	1	0	0	1
5	Kenya	0	2	3	5
6	United States	0	1	1	2
7	Ethiopia	0	1	0	1

=== All-time combined medal table ===
Rank	Nation	Gold	Silver	Bronze	Total
1	Kenya	11	9	9	29
2	Great Britain	4	6	4	14
3	Finland	4	3	2	9
4	Sweden	2	1	1	4
5	Poland	2	1	0	3
6	Morocco	2	0	1	3
7	Bahrain	2	0	0	2
8	United States	1	4	4	9
9	Russia	1	0	1	2
10	Belgium	1	0	0	1
10	Tunisia	1	0	0	1
10	Uganda	1	0	0	1
10	Canada	1	0	0	1
14	France	0	3	3	6
15	Soviet Union	0	2	2	4
16	Ethiopia	0	2	1	3
17	Hungary	0	1	0	1
17	Tanzania	0	1	0	1
19	Italy	0	0	2	2
20	East Germany	0	0	1	1
20	Germany	0	0	1	1
20	Norway	0	0	1	1
Total		33	33	33	99

== Other distances ==
=== 2500 metres ===
Games	Gold	Silver	Bronze
1900 Paris	George Orton (CAN)	Sidney Robinson (GBR)	Jacques Chastanié (FRA)

=== 2590 metres ===
Games	Gold	Silver	Bronze
1904 St. Louis	James Lightbody (USA)	John Daly (GBR)	Arthur Newton (USA)

=== 3200 metres ===
Games	Gold	Silver	Bronze
1908 London	Arthur Russell (GBR)	Archie Robertson (GBR)	John Eisele (USA)

=== 4000 metres ===
Games	Gold	Silver	Bronze
1900 Paris	John Rimmer (GBR)	Charles Bennett (GBR)	Sidney Robinson (GBR)
