= Matilainen =

Matilainen is a Finnish surname. Notable people with the surname include:

- Kalle Matilainen (runner) (1899–1985), Finnish Olympic runner
- Jukka Matilainen (1901–1967), Finnish Olympic runner, brother of Kalle Matilainen
- Martti Matilainen (1907–1993), Finnish Olympic runner, brother of Kalle Matilainen
