= Harold Manning =

American long-distance runner (1909–2003)

Harold William Manning (January 9, 1909 – January 26, 2003) was an American long-distance runner. He held the American record in the men's 3000-meter steeplechase from 1934 to 1952 and briefly held the world best in 1936. He represented the United States in the steeplechase at the 1936 Summer Olympics, placing fifth.

== Biography ==
Manning was born in Sedgwick, Kansas on January 9, 1909. He took up running as a schoolboy; in 1927, his senior year at Sedgwick High School, he won the mile run at both the Kansas state meet and the national interscholastic meet in Chicago. After graduating from high school Manning went to Wichita University on an athletic scholarship.

In 1929 Manning placed second in the two-mile run at the NCAA championships; he led for most of the way, but lost a close final lap duel against defending champion Dave Abbott of Illinois. At that year's United States outdoor championships, organized by the Amateur Athletic Union (AAU), Manning placed third in the mile. Manning won the two miles at the 1930 NCAA meet, becoming Wichita University's first national champion; his winning time, 9:18.1, broke Abbott's meeting record from 1928 and missed Tell Berna's collegiate record from 1912 by only three-tenths of a second. Manning graduated from Wichita University in 1931.

Manning attempted to qualify for the 1932 Summer Olympics in Los Angeles in the 3000-meter steeplechase; he won at the Midwestern Tryouts in 9:20.1, then his personal best. He entered the final United States Olympic Trials as one of the favorites to make the American team, but failed to replicate his earlier form; he placed fifth in 9:35.0e, missing third place and the final Olympic spot by approximately eighty yards.

Manning won his first AAU championship title in the steeplechase in 1934, outkicking defending champion Joe McCluskey in 9:13.1; he broke McCluskey's American record of 9:14.5 from the 1932 Olympic Trials. At the 1935 AAU championships Manning placed second behind McCluskey, but he regained the title in 1936.

=== World best and Olympics ===
The 1936 United States Olympic Trials were held at Randall's Island Stadium in New York City on July 11 and July 12, a week after the 1936 AAU championships. Closing with a fast sprint, Manning won the 3000-meter steeplechase in 9:08.2, qualifying for the Olympic Games; his time broke Volmari Iso-Hollo's world mark of 9:09.4 from 1933. In his record run Manning hurdled the water jumps without touching the barriers, then a new technique. The warm conditions at the Trials (which were held during the 1936 North American heat wave) were not conducive to setting records in long-distance races; interviewed after the race, Manning noted he was used to hot weather. The International Amateur Athletic Federation (IAAF) did not ratify world records in the steeplechase before 1954, so Manning's time was only a world best; it was officially ratified as an American record but not as a world record.

Manning's record made him one of the favorites for the 1936 Summer Olympics in Berlin, although Iso-Hollo, who was the defending Olympic champion, was still expected to take the gold again. Manning's chances were damaged when he fell ill en route to the Olympics and recovered slowly. In Berlin he placed second behind Iso-Hollo in his heat; in the final he stayed in medal contention for most of the way but was outkicked at the end and placed fifth in 9:11.2. Iso-Hollo, who won in 9:03.8, regained the world best; the other medalists (Kaarlo Tuominen and Alfred Dompert) also broke Manning's Trials mark.

Manning's American record lasted until 1952, when Horace Ashenfelter ran 9:06.4 at the U.S. Olympic Trials. Manning died in Wichita, Kansas on January 26, 2003. He was inducted into the Pizza Hut Shocker Sports Hall of Fame as a charter member in 1980, and was posthumously named to the Kansas Sports Hall of Fame and the Wichita Sports Hall of Fame.

Records
Preceded by (Finland) Volmari Iso-Hollo	Men's 3000-meter steeplechase world best holder July 12, 1936 – August 8, 1936	Succeeded by (Finland) Volmari Iso-Hollo
Preceded by (United States) Joe McCluskey	Men's 3000-meter steeplechase United States record holder June 30, 1934 – June 28, 1952	Succeeded by (United States) Horace Ashenfelter
