= Athletics at the 1932 Summer Olympics – Men's 3000 metres steeplechase =

Men's 3000 metres steeplechase at the Games of the X Olympiad
- Venue: Los Angeles Memorial Coliseum
- Dates: August 1 and August 2, 1932
- Competitors: 15 from 8 nations

Medalists
1st place, gold medalist(s)		Volmari Iso-Hollo; Finland
2nd place, silver medalist(s)		Tom Evenson; Great Britain
3rd place, bronze medalist(s)		Joe McCluskey; United States

The Men's 3000 Metres Steeplechase event at the 1932 Summer Olympics was 3460 metres due to an error in lap counting – the runners did an extra lap of the track.

== Results ==
=== Round One ===
The fastest five athletes in each of the two heats advanced to the Final Round.

Heat One

Rank	Name	Nationality	Time	Notes
1	Tom Evenson	Great Britain	9:18.8	OR, Q
2	Walter Pritchard	United States	9:19.2	Q
3	Verner Toivonen	Finland	9:41.0	Q
4	Giuseppe Lippi	Italy	9:42.0	Q
5	Nello Bartolini	Italy	9:49.0	Q
6	Roger Vigneron	France	9:57.0	
-	Luis Oliva	Argentina	DNF	

Heat Two

Rank	Name	Nationality	Time	Notes
1	Volmari Iso-Hollo	Finland	9:14.6	OR, Q
2	Joe McCluskey	United States	9:14.8	Q
3	Glen Dawson	United States	9:15.0	Q
4	George Bailey	Great Britain	9:16.0	Q
5	Martti Matilainen	Finland	9:43.0	Q
6	Alfredo Furia	Italy	10:11.0	
-	Harold Gallop	Canada	DNF	
-	Sonny Murphy	Ireland	DNF	

=== Final ===
Rank	Name	Nationality	Time	Notes
1st place, gold medalist(s)	Volmari Iso-Hollo	Finland	10:33.4	
2nd place, silver medalist(s)	Tom Evenson	Great Britain	10:46.0	
3rd place, bronze medalist(s)	Joe McCluskey	United States	10:46.2	
4	Martti Matilainen	Finland	10:52.4	
5	George Bailey	Great Britain	10:53.2	
6	Glen Dawson	United States	10:58.0	
7	Giuseppe Lippi	Italy	11:04.0	
8	Walter Pritchard	United States	11:04.5	
9	Verner Toivonen	Finland	11:10.2	
10	Nello Bartolini	Italy	11:29.0	
