= Glen Dawson (athlete) =

American runner

Glen Wilson Dawson (August 1, 1906 – January 19, 1968) was an American runner. He represented the United States in the men's 3000-meter steeplechase at the 1932 and 1936 Summer Olympics, qualifying for the final both times.

== Biography ==
Glen Dawson was born in Tulsa, Oklahoma on August 1, 1906. He grew up in Skiatook, Oklahoma, and took up running in grade school. In 1927, his senior year in high school, he set a state high school record in the mile run and won one of the two mile races at the national interscholastic meet in Chicago. Subsequently, Dawson attended the Central State Teachers College and from 1929 the University of Oklahoma. Dawson competed in the 10,000 meters at the 1928 United States Olympic Trials, but did not qualify for the Olympic team.

Coached by John Jacobs, Dawson had a successful collegiate career with the Oklahoma Sooners, winning the Big Six mile championship both indoors and outdoors in 1930 and again in 1931; at the 1931 outdoor meet he also won the two miles. He placed third in the mile at the 1931 NCAA championships. In 1932, his last year in college, he took up the 3000 meter steeplechase and attempted to qualify for the Summer Olympics in Los Angeles in that event. Dawson lost to Harold Manning at the Midwestern Tryouts in Evanston; before the final Trials he was not favored to make the American team. At the final Olympic Trials in Stanford Dawson placed third in 9:18.4e and earned the last spot on the American steeplechase squad; the winner, Joe McCluskey, set a new world best of 9:14.5.

In Los Angeles, Dawson was drawn in the same heat as McCluskey and eventual Olympic champion Volmari Iso-Hollo. He qualified for the final by placing third in 9:15.0, a time that would remain his lifetime best. The Olympic final turned into a 3460-meter steeplechase due to a lap counter's error; Dawson placed sixth in 10:58.0.

In 1933 Dawson won the national (AAU) indoor championship in the 1000 meters and defeated Glenn Cunningham in an indoor mile race in Tulsa. He was seen as a potential challenger to Cunningham as America's leading miler, but in later races Cunningham proved stronger. Dawson won the AAU 1000-meter title again in 1935, and placed fourth (behind Cunningham, Gene Venzke and Archie San Romani) in the 1500 meters outdoors that year.

In the Olympic year 1936 Dawson again turned to the steeplechase; he placed second behind Manning at the AAU championships, his best result in the national outdoor meet. The Olympic Trials were held separately in New York City the following week; Dawson placed third behind Manning and McCluskey in 9:23.2, qualifying for his second consecutive Olympic Games. At the Olympics in Berlin he was fourth in his heat, defeating 1932 silver medalist Tom Evenson in a fight for the last spot in the final; in the final he placed eighth in 9:21.1.

Dawson retired from running in 1937 to start a business career. He died in Tulsa on January 19, 1968, after a long illness.
