= St. Anthony's High School (South Huntington, New York) =

Private school in New York, United States

- Home of the Friars

Location
- 275 Wolf Hill Road; South Huntington, New York 11747; United States; 40°48′45″N 73°23′19″W

Information
- Type: Private, parochial
- Motto: Deus Meus Et Omnia (My God and My All)
- Religious affiliations: Roman Catholic, Franciscan
- Patron saints: St. Anthony of Padua; St. Francis of Assisi
- Established: 1933
- School code: 1. 696
- Principal: Br. David Migliorino
- Chaplain: Rev. John Crozier
- Faculty: ~150
- Grades: 9–12
- Gender: Coeducational
- Enrollment: 2410 (2024)
- Average class size: 22 : 1
- Campus: Single Building
- Campus type: Suburban
- Colors: Black and Gold
- Slogan: Capture the Heart and the Mind Will Follow.
- Mascot: The Friar
- Team name: Friars
- Accreditation: Middle States Association of Colleges and Schools
- Publication: Friar Focus
- Newspaper: The Paduan; The Friar Scoreboard (sports)
- Yearbook: The Anthonian
- School fees: $550 Registration Fee (2024) $200 Graduation Fee (Seniors Only)
- Tuition: $12,550 (2024-2025)
- Enrollment Exam: TACHS
- Academic Dean: Paul Washington
- Dean of Freshman: Joshua DiMauro
- Dean of Men: Robert Arrigo
- Dean of Women: Christina Buehler
- Website: http://www.stanthonyshs.org

St. Anthony's High School is a Roman Catholic college preparatory (grades 9–12) school located in South Huntington, New York on Long Island. The school was founded in 1933 by the Franciscan Brothers of Brooklyn.

== History ==
Having come to Brooklyn from Ireland at the invitation of Bishop Loughlin, the Franciscan brothers served the Brooklyn diocese as educators and child care providers. The order expanded to rural Smithtown in 1929 with the establishment of Mount St. Francis Novitiate and Normal School, having acquired Mill House, an already old property dating back to the first half of the 19th century, in 1928.

Plans were made for a new Juniorate to board young men at a new location from the Order's existing Juniorate at St. Francis Preparatory School, then in Brooklyn. On August 31, 1933, ground broke on the new facility in Smithtown, New York. The ground-breaking marks the founding of St. Anthony's and its date appears on the school's crest.

Until 1936 freshman began their studies at St. Francis Preparatory School and only sophomores, juniors and seniors boarded and studied at the Smithtown campus.The attendance was modest and never expanded to more than 50 or 60 pupils during the early years. The first five students graduated in June 1935.

In 1949, the Franciscan Novitiate moved from Mill House in Smithtown to Wyandanch, New York and Mill House began to house the Juniorate and faculty. In 1957, the decision was made to expand the school's enrollment as a day school to accommodate a growing Catholic population on Long Island and in the next year, enrollment increased from 40 to approximately 125. The school continued to grow, both in enrollment and with additional facilities on the Smithtown campus in the San Remo section of the hamlet, until 1984.

On December 5, 1983, Most Reverend John R. McGann announced that, as part of extensive changes in the educational plans of the Roman Catholic Diocese of Rockville Centre, Holy Family Diocesan High School, South Huntington, New York, would close in June 1984, and St. Anthony's High School move to the Holy Family facility. The two schools, once athletic rivals, were merged and the enrollment and faculty were significantly expanded as a private coeducational high school. This decision sparked massive controversy and protest among the students teachers, and even some of the brothers as nobody was told about it.

St. Anthony's High School is now at the former Holy Family location at 275 Wolf Hill Road in South Huntington.

== Curriculum ==
The basic curriculum at St. Anthony's includes required courses in Theology, English, Social Studies and Physical Education (4 years); Mathematics, Science, Foreign Language (3 years); Fine Arts (Health, Art, Music or Drama) (1 year). Honors and Advanced Placement courses are offered to students who qualify, with electives in all disciplines.

== Notable alumni ==
- Kenny Atkinson, Professional basketball coach for the Cleveland Cavaliers, and formerly for the Brooklyn Nets in the National Basketball Association
- Dan Barry, writer
- Andre Cisco, American football safety for the Jacksonville Jaguars in the National Football League
- KJ Duff, college football wide receiver for the Rutgers Scarlet Knights
- Brian Fitzpatrick, relief pitcher for the Milwaukee Brewers
- John Gregorek, Olympic middle distance runner for the 3000-m steeplechase
- Alan Hahn, sports talk radio host on ESPN Radio and Studio analyst on MSG Network
- Chris Koepplin, former placekicker for the Buffalo Bills and the New England Patriots
- Nick LaLota, Member of the United States House of Representatives from New York's 1st congressional district
- Brian McNamara, actor and Golden Globe nominee
- Jim Pavese, Former NHL hockey player for the St. Louis Blues, New York Rangers, Detroit Red Wings, and Hartford Whalers
- Paul Scheer, actor, producer, podcaster and comedian
- Tom Schreiber, lacrosse player
- Rob Scuderi, NHL hockey player; defenseman and Stanley Cup Champion with the Pittsburgh Penguins and the Los Angeles Kings
- Adam Shoemaker, Episcopal clergyman
- Ian Strong, college football wide receiver for the Rutgers Scarlet Knights
- Richard Wiese, explorer, television host and producer
- Sydney Taylor, professional basketball player in the WNBA
