= 1938 European Athletics Championships – Men's 3000 metres steeplechase =

Men's 3000 metres steeplechase at the European Athletics Championships

The men's 3000 metres steeplechase at the 1938 European Athletics Championships was held in Paris, France, at Stade Olympique de Colombes on 5 September 1938.

== Medalists ==
Gold	Lars Larsson; Sweden
Silver	Ludwig Kaindl; Germany
Bronze	Alf Lindblad; Finland

== Results ==
=== Final ===
5 September

Rank	Name	Nationality	Time	Notes
1st place, gold medalist(s)	Lars Larsson	Sweden	9:16.2	CR
2nd place, silver medalist(s)	Ludwig Kaindl	Germany	9:19.2	
3rd place, bronze medalist(s)	Alf Lindblad	Finland	9:21.4	
4	Kaarlo Tuominen	Finland	9:28.6	
5	Roger Cuzol	France	9:42.2	
6	Gaston Tinard	France	9:43.0	
7	Ferdinando Migliaccio	Italy	9:45.2	
8	Wacław Soldan	Poland	9:58.4	

== Participation ==
According to an unofficial count, 8 athletes from 6 countries participated in the event.

- Finland (2)
- France (2)
- Germany (1)
- Italy (1)
- Poland (1)
- Sweden (1)
