= Nello Bartolini =

Italian runner

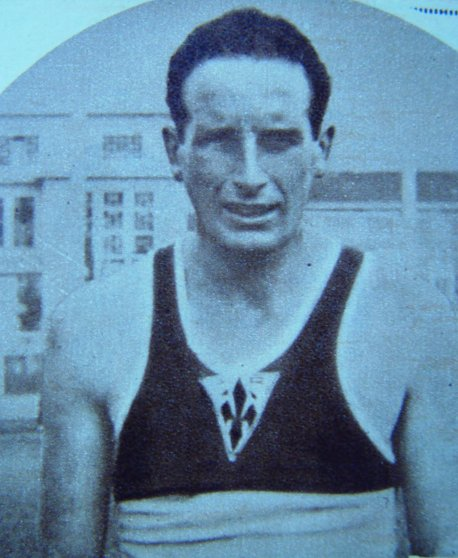
- Bartolini in the 1930s

Personal information
- Nationality: Italian
- Born: 13 June 1904 Florence
- Died: 19 March 1956 (aged 51) Florence

Sport
- Country: Italy
- Sport: Athletics
- Events: Long-distance running 3000 metres steeplechase
- Club: Giglio Rosso
- Retired: 1934

Achievements and titles
- Personal best: 3000 m st: 9:23.2 (1932)

Nello Bartolini (13 June 1904 – 19 March 1956) was an Italian long-distance runner and steeplechase runner who competed at the 1928 Summer Olympics, and at the 1932 Summer Olympics.

== Biography ==
In the 1930s, he was famous in Italy for his sport rivalry with the Florentine fellow and teammate of the Giglio Rosso, Giuseppe Lippi.

== Achievements ==
Year	Competition	Venue	Position	Event	Time	Notes
1928	Olympic Games	(Netherlands) Amsterdam	Round One (6th)	3000 metres steeplechase	NM	
1932	Olympic Games	(United States) Los Angeles	10th	3000 metres steeplechase	11:29.0	
1934	European Championships	(Italy) Turin	7th	5000 metres	15:26.0	

== National titles ==
He won eight national championships at individual senior level.

- Italian Athletics Championships
  - 5000 metres: 1930
  - 3000 metres steeplechase: 1926, 1927, 1931, 1932, 1934
  - Cross country: 1931. 1932
