= Fyffe Christie =

British artist

Fyffe William George Christie (2 February 1918, Bushey, Hertfordshire, England – 6 March 1979) was a British figurative artist and mural painter. He served in the British Army during World War II as a bagpiper and stretcher bearer. He began painting during the war and attended the Glasgow School of Art from 1946 to 1951. After graduating, he began painting murals, including Christ Feeding the People (1950-1951) and various others in Glasgow, including one in the Glasgow University Union. Christie then moved to London, where he taught at various schools and continued painting. While at the Glasgow School of Art, he specialised in stained glass and mural painting, and was influenced by the art of the early Italian Renaissance.

== Early years ==
Fyffe Christie was born in the English town of Bushey, Hertfordshire, in 1918. His father was a Scot, George Fyffe Christie, a freelance commercial artist who illustrated children's books and cartoon postcards featuring children and animals. As a commercial artist father George may have been attracted to Bushey by its closeness to London and the town's reputation as an artistic colony as previously established by the artist Hubert Herkomer. It was there that George met and married an English girl, Fyffe's mother Ethel.

Around 1930 Ethel died and at the age of twelve Fyffe moved back to Glasgow with his father and younger brother Andrew to live together with his uncle David and aunt Tiz in Glasgow's Pollokshields district. Fyffe Christie had severe dyslexia and was unable to read until diagnosed at the age of twelve, after which he became a keen scholar and avid reader, including Latin and Greek. He was also fully ambidextrous and struggled as the teachers of that time insisted he write only with his right hand. Two years later tragedy struck again as brother Andrew died. Fyffe showed an early interest in drawing and painting, and developed a lifelong love of music, particularly classical music and opera, while he himself learned to play the bagpipes. Father George Christie had some commercial success with his creation of the cartoon strip Scottikin O' the Bulletin in the popular Glasgow newspaper the Bulletin but he struggled financially through the years of the recession however and so he discouraged Fyffe's artistic ambition. Due to economic hardship Christie had to leave school early, despite his academic abilities and George Christie insisted his son begin a career in the more secure legal profession. After two years working in a lawyers office Fyffe left and began an apprenticeship arranged for him as a lithographic draughtsman but he remained unhappy and frustrated with his life.

== World War Two ==
At the outset of The Second World War Fyffe Christie joined the British Army as a bagpiper (pipers at that time also served a dual role as stretcher bearers while in the field), attending a course at the Army School of Piping in Edinburgh Castle. He was then posted to the 9th battalion the Cameronians (Scottish Rifles). The battalion was in continuous action after landing at Arromanches following the D-Day landings, 6 June 1944 and suffered heavy casualties as they fought for eleven months from Normandy into Northern Germany. In his article 'Fyffe Christie: Scottish Soldier and Artist' in the regimental magazine 'The Covenanter' friend Dr. Ted Allan CBE described how the battalion received its baptism of fire on its first attack to take the village of Haut Du Bosq when its casualties totalled 120 killed and wounded, followed by bitter fighting in the orchards around Eterville while resisting a German counterattack. Christie witnessed the most horrific scenes as the battalion marched down a road in the Falaise Gap following the virtual annihilation of the retreating German Army.

During rest periods Christie began to sketch and paint the scenes and landscapes around him in ink and watercolours as a refuge and way of coping with what he witnessed in combat, Allan states that Christie maintained that this was "not just art but a defence mechanism". These sketches and watercolours are now held in the Cameronian's Regimental Museum, the National Museum of Scotland in Edinburgh, and the Imperial War Museum, London; while the majority are with the Second World War Experience Centre in Otley near Leeds, West Yorkshire . Many of the young soldiers he served with were illiterate and, having overcome his own childhood dyslexia, Christie often helped his comrades by reading their letters from home and writing their replies for them. Ted Allan described how pipers were popular figures during the liberation of towns as the battalion fought its way towards Germany, the men of the regiment forming a particular and lasting bond with the people of Tilburg in the Netherlands in this way. Shortly afterwards the men of 9th battalion were involved in the battle for Moylands Woods, a particularly brutal fight and prelude to the advance into Germany itself. The battalion had frequently been opposed by elite German parachute units (often of the 7th Division) but as the fighting progressed the men found themselves increasingly facing fanatical Hitler Youth and the old men of the Volksturm. In the advance into Germany there was also the discovery of Concentration Camps, yet Allan also refers to an incident in which humanity took precedence and a surrender was arranged in the middle of a battle on the basis that the Cameronian stretcher bearers entered an uncleared minefield in order to extricate the German wounded".

In the same Covenanter article Fyffe's wife Eleanor Christie explained that his father George's opposition to an artistic career lessened as he was greatly impressed by the quality of the sketches and watercolours Fyffe was sending home from the front while at the same time Fyffe was also greatly encouraged by his comrades who admired his paintings. Fyffe later told her that it was in the last days of the war, as he stood in a bombed out German railway station gazing out at the landscape that he made the final decision to become an artist". The Imperial War Museum now owns one of Christie's watercolours of Lübeck Station and it might possibly be that Christie reached his decision while painting this watercolour. As Eleanor Christie explains in the article "His lifelong interest in landscape painting was more than just a joy and relaxation from the more serious business of mural painting and teaching; it answered a deep-felt need to re-affirm his belief in the solid reality of the world and its ability to regenerate itself and beauty". The battalion were clearing pockets of SS troops from the Sachsenwald Forest when VE Day arrived. In his youth he had become interested in religion and evangelical movements, after the war he remained religious but was never affiliated to any specific church. Eleanor Christie recalled that some years after the war Christie began painting a huge war mural some 12 foot long at their home depicting the field of battle with dead and dying soldiers painted in grim grey and brown colours. Possibly this may have been the road which the battalion marched through in the Falaise Gap episode, a road which had been literally bulldozed clear of the smashed remnants of the retreating German army to allow the Allied troops to advance. Eleanor Christie states that Fyffe spoke little of the war and this was his only attempt at a direct catharsis. He destroyed the painting shortly after completion.

== Glasgow School of Art ==
Christie attended the Glasgow School of Art from 1946 to 1951. He loved the art of the early Italian Renaissance, especially Giotto and Piero della Francesca, and after two years of general studies began to specialise in studying stained glass and mural painting under Walter Pritchard. Christie exhibited a mural stained glass window at the Edinburgh Festival titled The Last Supper in 1951. Biographer Ted Allan was, like Christie, a veteran who enrolled at the school immediately after the war, and in his article in The Covenanter he describes the difficulties of these older men and women returning to study after years of war and the hardship of living on a tight government grant; he describes Christie living on a diet of kippers and getting into trouble with his landlady through his attempts to brew beer in his bedsit and even grow tobacco in his window box. Teacher Walter Pritchard was a respected figure in mural art, and Christie worked with him in the painting of a large mural behind the altar of St. Francis-in-the-East church in Bridgeton, Glasgow. Christie also worked with Pritchard and an unknown artist whose surname was Roy painting a series of murals in the Curler's Tavern in Byres Road in the West End of Glasgow. Christie's contribution was a mural on the English folk song "Widecombe Fair", while Pritchard took the Robert Burns poem Tam O' Shanter for his subject, and Roy created caricatures of historic figures using the bar's regulars, including the Scottish poet Hugh MacDiarmid (Pritchard's lodger at the time), as models. Christie had a lifelong love of music, and this would be a recurring theme in his work. In the 1970s these murals were threatened as new owners intended to remove them, but this was successfully opposed by the Glasgow People's Palace Museum curators Elspeth King and Michael Donnelly. Some years later during another refurbishment, and with Elspeth King no longer at the People's Palace Museum, the murals were thrown out. Only Roy's murals survived, being salvaged from a rubbish skip by one of the barmaids, and these now hang on the walls of the Òran Mór Bar, formerly a church and now a bar and arts venue in Glasgow's Byres Road".

== Christ Feeding the People ==
In the post-diploma year of 1950-1951 Christie painted the mural of Christ Feeding the People for the Iona Community. The work was commissioned by the dynamic founder and leader of the community the Reverend George MacLeod who had been responsible for the reconstruction of Iona Abbey on the Island of Iona off Scotland's west coast. The 35 foot long mural painted on eight panels covered the walls of the community centre cafe on Clyde Street, Glasgow which was open to the public as a community centre and to provide cheap and nutritious food to visitors and the city's homeless. Christie depicted the huge scene of an interior with ordinary folk, men returning from work and women baking and bathing children, while the figure of Jesus was placed at the centre of the activity and the act of the breaking of bread placed at the heart of community life. As Christine Jardine wrote in an article in the Scottish Herald Newspaper the work was intended to be in accord with the community's declared aim of "rebuilding the common life" and it arguably achieved this by depicting ordinary community life in a contemporary Glasgow setting. Robert Radford wrote "The allegorical references to the labour of men and women and to community and service are, in essence, biblical but also universal, expressing the potential for transcendence of normality which this work shares with Spencer's Memorial Chapel at Burghclere".

The mural became familiar to the generations of Glaswegians who frequented the centre. Shortly after completion of the work the newspaper The Glasgow Herald ran an article on mural art in Scotland and the work of the muralists Walter Pritchard, William Crosbie and Christie, the "powerful simplicity" of Christie's Iona Community mural drawing particular praise. Christie preferred to paint directly onto the wall but the Iona Community specified that the commission was completed on panels. Fortunately this allowed the work to be saved following the closure and demolition of the centre. The mural was exhibited at an Edinburgh gallery shortly after the closure and then disappeared for two decades, whereabouts unknown, before being mysteriously rediscovered and put up for sale by an English art dealer in the 1990s. Disputes over ownership arose and there was some enthusiastic coverage in the Scottish press, The Scotsman and Glasgow Herald newspapers, regarding the significance of the mural and the need for it to return to Scotland Despite this, and despite an offer by the art dealer to sell it to a Scottish buyer for only the cost of his purchase and restoration, and despite its being put on exhibition at the St Mungo Museum of Religious Life and Art in Glasgow the City Council showed little enthusiasm and argued that there was nowhere in the city suitable for displaying such a large mural. the head of Curatorial Service Mr. Mark O'Neill stating that "We would not be able to guarantee it a permanent display...It is so big that it would take up an entire picture gallery and you would have to remove, for example, all of the Scottish colourists.". The work was subsequently sold to an unknown private buyer at auction in London in 1998, its current location is unknown.

== The Glasgow murals ==
Detail Mary, Queen of Scots, Glasgow University Union

In the austere economic years following the Second World War Christie found that although his work was admired it was difficult for him to obtain commissions. In his Bibliographical Essay David Buckman wrote "Christie's contribution to the resurgence of secular and religious Scottish mural painting at this time has never been adequately acknowledged". Of the few murals he did paint many are gone, some have been painted over while one painted in collaboration with artist Gavin Alston at Crossmyloof Ice Rink in Glasgow was lost when the building was demolished. A mural illustrating Children's Nursery Rhymes for a house in Bearsden, Glasgow, was lost when the house was taken over by tenants from the American Consulate. A few works do still survive such as the Children's Games mural, 1955, in Hillhead Primary School, Glasgow which was composed of four or five panels each approximately 4 ft X 5 ft

At the James Bridie Memorial Room in Glasgow University Union there is the mural based on the song West End Perk by James Bridie the playwright and poet. The work was originally sited near the entrance to the Citizens Theatre in Glasgow before being purchased by the James Bridie Trust for the Memorial Room. Christie used a muted palette which perhaps give his murals a tapestry like quality, although today this can be partly due to the fading of the original colours. He also avoided painting monumental works with larger than life figures, preferring his painting to remain human in scale.

Christie's interest in music and piping continued and he became a member of the Glasgow University Piping Society. This led to a commission to paint panels illustrating the history of the piobaireachd or pibroch for the Glasgow College of Piping which was completed in 1954. The panel illustrates many well known pipe tunes or Ceol Mor such as Lament for Donald Ban and The Big Spree. Later the mural was stored away and forgotten for many years when the college moved to a new address in Glasgow's Otago Street. In recent years it was re-discovered and when the college was re-built the mural was properly restored and is now on display in the meeting room where it can be viewed by appointment.

Fyffe and Eleanor Christie worked as art teachers in Glasgow (Eleanor studying sculpture) until 1957 when they decided that they had to leave for better job prospects in England.

== London ==
Christie taught at the Gurney School for Disadvantaged Children in Ilford before moving to the Park Modern School (later the Barking Abbey School) where he taught until retirement.

The couple lived in the Ilford suburb of Seven Kings before moving to a smaller flat in Blackheath. During his career at the school he produced around 200 informal portrait drawings of his pupils mostly executed between 1964 and 1974 which later featured in exhibitions, the 'Children and Childhood Exhibition' at the City Arts Centre in Edinburgh, 1989; and at the Bethnal Green Museum of Childhood Exhibition in 1991. In her essay 'Children, Poses, Portraiture' Ludmilla Jordanova wrote "I believe these portraits are profoundly moving because they generate in viewers an immediate and vivid sense of the ambiguities of teenage years, of being in between.".

Not long after their move to London a solo exhibition was held at Foley's Gallery in Charing Cross Road in 1958 which attracted favourable reviews in the Glasgow Herald. At this time Christie was attempting to adapt the mural genre into something suitable for a domestic interior and this took the form of "portable murals", draught screens with illustrations including "The Lady of Shalott" and "The Magic Flute". Christie was not however a self-publicist and the ascendancy of abstract art in the latter 20th century led to fewer commissions for figurative artists. He did continue to paint murals when the opportunity arose, often undertaking the work for the cost of the paint and allowing his teaching to subsidize his art. One commission was of A Modern Pilgrim's Progress a 12 foot by 27 foot 'Duresco' painted directly onto the walls of the Little Ilford Baptist Tabernacle in London in 1961, Christie carrying out this work voluntarily. This mural has survived although the colours have faded badly through sunlight and it is in need of restoration.

Christie was perhaps influenced by various styles and painters in the various genres he worked with, Robert Radford has drawn some comparisons with his oil painting and the work of Giorgione, Cézanne and Matisse for example, and his Still Life painting with the Scottish Colourists F.C.B. Cadell and Samuel Peploe. His murals with their stylised figures have often been compared with those of the English artist Stanley Spencer, in an article in The Glasgow Herald in 1958 on Christie's exhibition one London Art Critic noted "In these panel works the influence of Stanley Spencer can be traced, but with a symbolism of Christie's own" Spencer was born and grew up in the village of Cookham, just north of London and not far from Christie's birthplace of Bushey. Spencer, like Christie, experienced war, the First World War, serving like Christie in a medical capacity with the Royal Army Medical Corp. Robert Radford described Christie's service as stretcher bearer as " work which demands an encounter with the limits of human experience from the preciousness and frailty of the body to the courage and vitality of the spirit subjected to the extremities of danger and pain. It is significant how closely this matched the experience of Stanley Spencer in the previous Great War, an artist whose example must have informed at some level Christie's subsequent work as a muralist.". But Spencer was of an earlier generation and any further links are tentative, for instance the Scottish artist and draughtsman Muirhead Bone was a close friend of Spencer while Bone's brother William was Christie's drawing teacher at the Glasgow School of Art. The stylised mules painted at the top of Christie's Pilgrim's Progress mural also bear a notable resemblance to those painted by Spencer in his mural at the Sandham Memorial Chapel and his painting Travoys with Wounded Soldiers Arriving at a Dressing Station at Smol, Macedonia of 1919, held by the Imperial War Museum and it might possibly be argued that this minor feature in the Ilford mural is a passing homage to Spencer.

Other commissions included a Nativity Scene at St. Margaret's Stamford Rivers, England, and The Seasons painted circa 1970 for the Lennard Day Hospital, Bromley Hospital, in Kent, England (relocated to the Canada Wing of the Orpington Hospital). Christie also painted the battle of the Greeks and Trojans before the walls of Troy directly onto the wall for the Spartan Cafe in Bromley in Kent which was probably painted over when new owners took over. Christie's lifelong love of landscape painting also continued unabated, painting with his wife Eleanor on holidays in Scotland (particularly the Ayrshire and Argyle coast), England, France and Italy. As he worked he would attract crowds ohildren who would ask "'How much would that picture cost?' On getting his dry, invariable retort to that question - '£100' their amazement was unvarying.". Children would also be fascinated when the ambidextrous Christie would paint with both hands.

In the 1970s Christie attended Saturday morning life classes at the Sir John Cass School of Art and in 1973 he began a series of around 40 large figure compositions of nudes, oil on canvas, often painting in the living room of the small flat in which he and wife Eleanor lived, often working under artificial light. Other works included still lives. Many of these are now owned by several galleries in England, only one is held by a Scottish Gallery, The Stirling Smith Art Gallery and Museum but it is not on display at present.

Fyffe Christie suffered a heart attack in 1976 and considered retiring to allow himself to devote his final years to painting, but he could not afford such a move and continued working. He died on 6 March 1979, the same year in which he and Eleanor held a joint show locally at Woodlands Art Gallery in London.

== Posthumous exhibitions ==
Posthumous shows included: Exhibition of Drawings at the Glasgow School of Art. Cyril Gerber Fine Art, Glasgow, 1988. Fairhurst Gallery, Fulham, London, 1988. 'Children & Childhood' Exhibition, City Art Centre, Edinburgh, 1989. Exhibition of his schoolchildren drawings was held at the Bethnal Green Museum of Childhood, 1991. Exhibition, Blackheath Concert Halls. Exhibition, Norwich.

== Bibliography ==
- Buckman, D., Jordanova, L. and Radford, R., Nature and Humanity, the work of Fyffe Christie: 1918-1979, (Sansom & Company, Bristol, 2004)
- Glasgow Herald Newspaper: 11 November 1950, page 6, column A
- Glasgow Herald Newspaper: 17 August 1951, page 6, column D
- Glasgow Herald Newspaper: 20 August 1958, page 6, column G
- Glasgow Herald Newspaper: 14 March 1979, page 6, column G
- Smith, K., "Tangled Web", Scottish [Glasgow] Herald Newspaper, 3 December 2009
- Jardine, C., "Dispute over missing mural", Scottish [Glasgow] Herald Newspaper, 26 Aug 1998
- Jardine, C., "Bid to retrieve mural of Christ meeting Clydesiders", Scottish [Glasgow] Herald Newspaper, 31 Aug 1998
- Jardine, C., "A desire to be kept in the picture", Scottish [Glasgow] Herald Newspaper, 1 February 2011
- Brocklehurst, J.C., "Mural belongs to Glasgow", Scottish [Glasgow] Herald Newspaper, 9 Sep 1998
- Jardine, C., "Scottish bids for mural encouraged" & "A desire to be kept in the picture", Scottish [Glasgow] Herald Newspaper, 21 Sep 1998
- Dalton, A., "Iona group wants to buy back mural", The Scotsman Newspaper, 21 Aug 1998
- Tinning, W., "Iona mural may be lost to Scotland", Scottish [Glasgow] Herald Newspaper, 14 May 1999
- Henry, C., "An oasis, a wonder wall", Scottish [Glasgow] Herald Newspaper, 31 May 1999
- The Scotsman: 21 August 1998, Alastair Dalton
- Glasgow Bulletin Newspaper:
- Allan, Ted, "Fyffe Christie: Scottish Soldier and Artist", "The Covenanter", 2003, pp35–39
