= Glen Dawson =

Glen Dawson may refer to:

- Glen Dawson (athlete) (1906–1968), American steeplechase runner
- Glen Dawson (mountaineer) (1912–2016), American mountaineer
