= Sonny Murphy =

Irish middle-distance runner

Personal information
- Full name: Michael Murphy
- Nationality: Irish
- Born: 27 July 1906 Ballyvaughan, County Clare
- Died: 17 March 1936 (aged 29)

Sport
- Sport: Athletics
- Event: Steeplechase
- Club: O'Callaghans Mills

Achievements and titles
- Personal bests: 9:51.8 (Dublin, 1932)

Michael "Sonny" Murphy (27 July 1906 – 17 March 1936) was an Irish middle-distance runner from Kilnaboy, Co. Clare Ireland. He competed in the men's 3000 metres steeplechase at the 1932 Summer Olympics.
