= Harold Gallop =

Canadian middle-distance runner

Personal information
- Full name: Harold William Gallop
- Born: 9 June 1910 Toronto, Ontario, Canada
- Died: 13 July 2006 (aged 96) New York, United States

Sport
- Sport: Middle-distance running
- Event: Steeplechase

Harold William Gallop, later Harold Barry, (9 June 1910 – 13 July 2006) was a Canadian middle-distance runner. He competed in the men's 3000 metres steeplechase at the 1932 Summer Olympics.
