= René Desroches =

French middle-distance runner

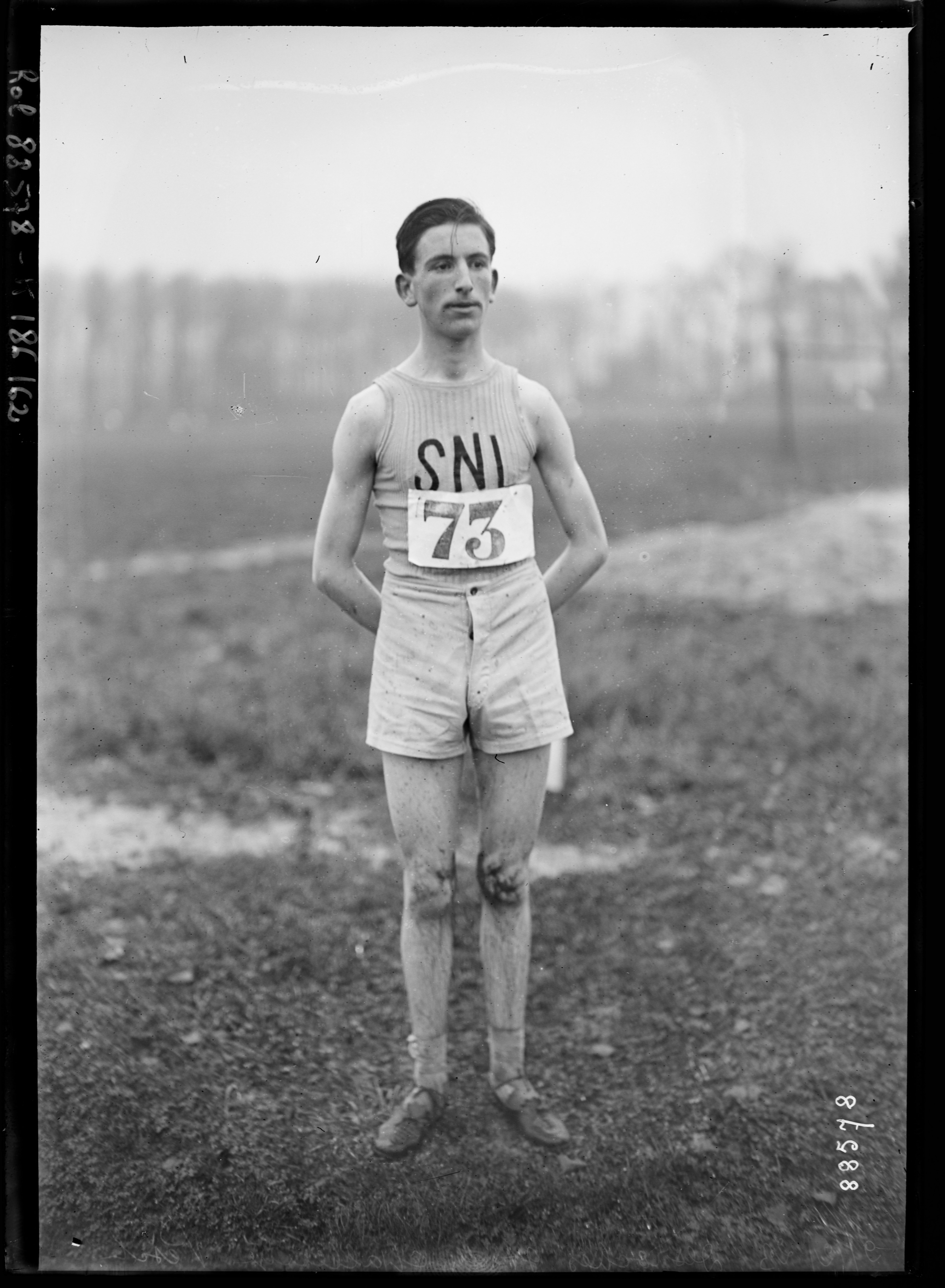
- Desroches in 1923

Personal information
- Full name: René Alexis François Desroches
- Born: 23 December 1905 Chabris, France
- Died: 4 June 1990 (aged 84) Orléans, France

Sport
- Country: France
- Sport: Athletics (middle-distance running)
- Event: Steeplechase
- Club: CA Orléans

René Alexis François Desroches (23 December 1905 – 4 June 1990) was a French middle-distance runner. He competed in the men's 3000 metres steeplechase at the 1936 Summer Olympics.
