= Voldemārs Vītols =

Latvian middle-distance runner

Personal information
- Nationality: Latvian
- Born: 27 January 1911
- Died: 24 February 1980 (aged 69)

Sport
- Sport: Middle-distance running
- Event: Steeplechase

Voldemārs Vītols (27 January 1911 – 24 February 1980) was a Latvian middle-distance runner. He competed in the men's 3000 metres steeplechase at the 1936 Summer Olympics.
