= Harry Holmqvist =

Swedish middle-distance runner

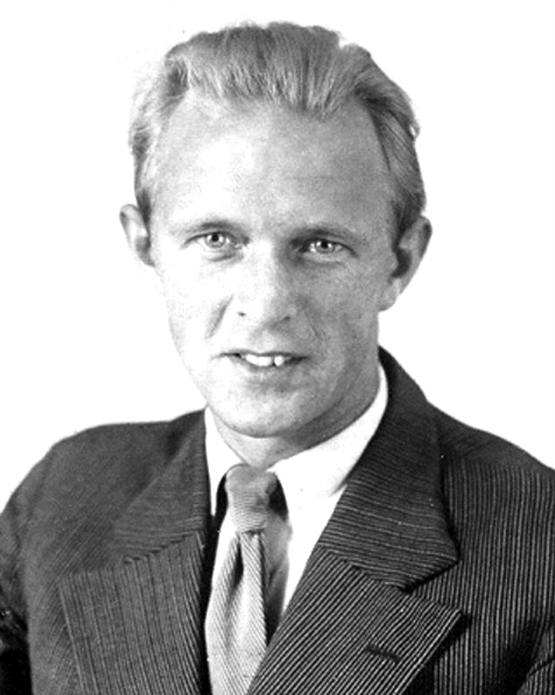

Personal information
- Born: 26 August 1907 Stockholm, Sweden
- Died: 11 April 2005 (aged 97) Älvsjö, Sweden

Sport
- Sport: Athletics
- Events: Steeplechase, 5000 m
- Club: IF Linnéa, Stockholm

Achievements and titles
- Personal bests: 3000 mS – 9:20.2 (1936); 5000 m – 14:59.6 (1935)

Harry Eggert Holmqvist (26 August 1907 – 11 April 2005) was a middle-distance runner from Sweden. He reached the 3000 m steeplechase final at the 1936 Summer Olympics, but did not finish the race.
