= Riccardo Fortini =

Italian high jumper

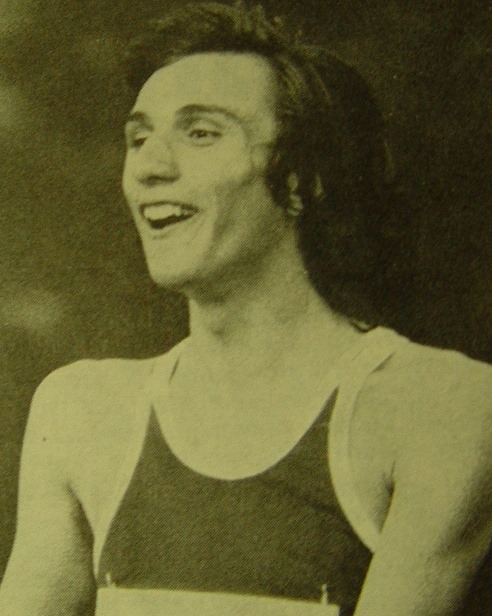

Personal information
- Nationality: Italian
- Born: 3 April 1957 Ponte a Signa
- Died: 28 August 2009 (aged 52) Ponte a Signa
- Height: 1.93 m (6 ft 4 in)
- Weight: 72 kg (159 lb)

Sport
- Country: Italy
- Sport: Athletics
- Event: High jump
- Club: ASSI Giglio Rosso

Riccardo Fortini (3 April 1957 – 28 August 2009) was an Italian high jumper who competed at the 1976 Summer Olympics.

== See also ==
- Men's high jump Italian record progression
