= Stephen Gostkowski =

American football player (born 1984)

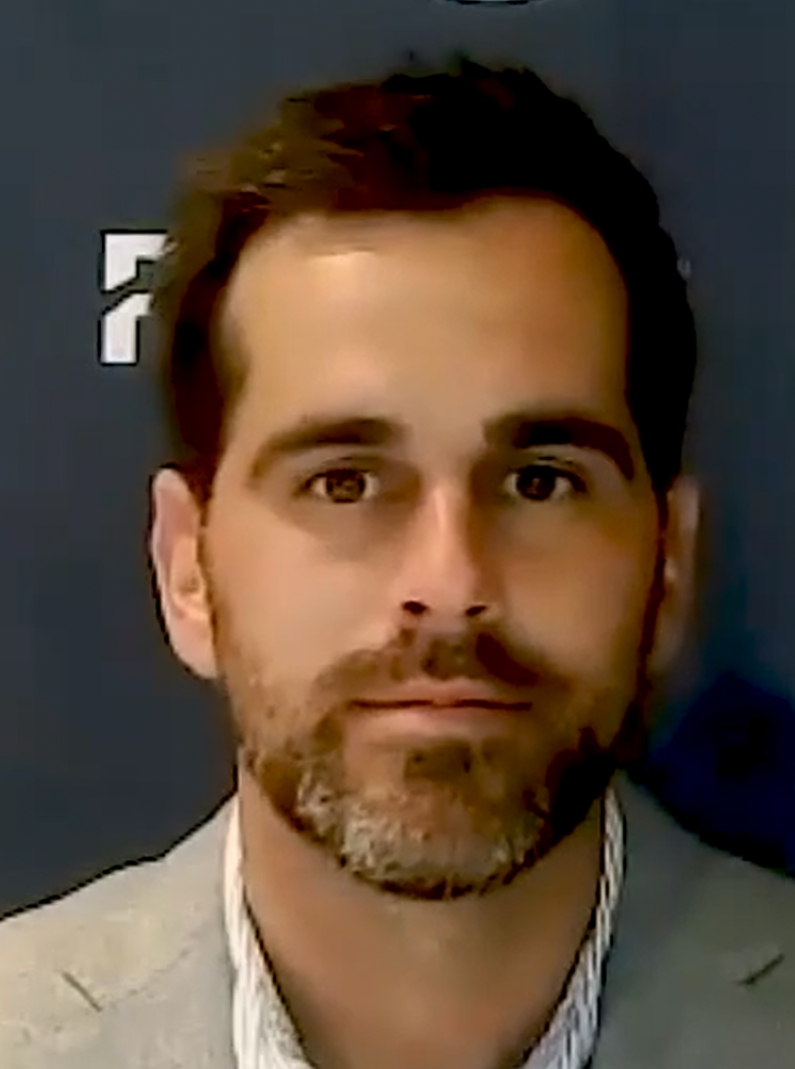
- Gostkowski in 2020

No. 3
- Position: Placekicker

Personal information
- Born: January 28, 1984 (age 42); Baton Rouge, Louisiana, U.S.
- Listed height: 6 ft 1 in (1.85 m)
- Listed weight: 215 lb (98 kg)

Career information
- High school: Madison Central (Madison, Mississippi)
- College: Memphis (2002–2005)
- NFL draft: 2006: 4th round, 118th overall pick

Career history
- New England Patriots (2006–2019); Tennessee Titans (2020)

Awards and highlights
- 3× Super Bowl champion (XLIX, LI, LIII); 2× First-team All-Pro (2008, 2015); Second-team All-Pro (2014); 4× Pro Bowl (2008, 2013–2015); 5× NFL scoring leader (2008, 2012–2015); NFL 2010s All-Decade Team; PFWA All-Rookie Team (2006); New England Patriots All-2010s Team; 2× First-team All-C-USA (2004, 2005); C-USA Special Teams Player of the Year (2005); NFL records: Most consecutive extra points made: 523; Most seasons leading league in points scored: 5 (2008, 2012–2015; tied with Don Hutson and Gino Cappelletti)

Career NFL statistics
- Field goals made: 392
- Field goals attempted: 454
- Field goal %: 86.34
- Longest field goal: 62
- Points scored: 1,875
- Touchbacks: 574
- Stats at Pro Football Reference

Stephen Carroll Gostkowski (/ɡɒstˈkaʊski/ gost-KOW-skee; (Note: Previous versions of Patriots' media guides gave the pronunciation as /ɡʌstˈaʊski/ gust-OW-skee, with the first k silent.) born January 28, 1984) is an American former professional football placekicker who played in the National Football League (NFL) for 15 seasons. A member of the New England Patriots for most of his career, Gostkowski is the franchise's all-time leading scorer. He played college football for the Memphis Tigers and was selected in the fourth round of the 2006 NFL draft by the Patriots, where Gostkowski spent his first 14 seasons. In his final season, Gostkowski played for the Tennessee Titans.

Gostkowski led the league in scoring five times during his career, including four consecutive from 2012 to 2015, and is the first post-merger player to lead the league in scoring for more than two consecutive seasons. He also holds the NFL record for consecutive extra points. Gostkowski received four Pro Bowl and two first-team All-Pro selections and won three Super Bowl titles.

== Early life ==
Gostkowski graduated from Madison Central High School in Madison, Mississippi, in 2002. While there, he won four varsity letters each in football and soccer, and three in baseball, and was an All-State honoree in all three sports. Gostkowski holds the school record for longest field goal, a 55-yard kick. His teammates at Madison Central included former 49ers executive Parys Haralson and former Seahawks center Chris Spencer. His opponents included former Atlanta Falcons running back Jerious Norwood, who returned one of Gostkowski's kickoffs from two yards deep in the end zone; Gostkowski raced him down at the 25-yard line to prevent a touchdown.

His most common nickname growing up was "Beaver"; he lost two front teeth playing hockey and had fake teeth that were too large put in as replacements. While at Memphis, he was dubbed "Gotti" by Tigers head coach Tommy West, because West could not pronounce Gostkowski correctly.

== College career ==
Gostkowski attended the University of Memphis, where he played football for the Memphis Tigers and majored in exercise and sports science. Gostkowski received an athletic scholarship to play baseball for Memphis, and was a walk-on for the football team. He finished his college career with a total of 369 points, a school record, and 13th overall in NCAA Division I-A history, converting 70 of 92 field goals and 159 of 165 extra points (PATs) during his Tiger career. His 70 field goals and 159 extra points both set school records previously held by Joe Allison (1990–1993). He earned first team All-Conference USA honors in both his junior and senior years and was named Conference USA's Special Teams Player of the Year in 2005.

In 2005, his senior season, Gostkowski handled kickoff duties for Memphis and had 39 touchbacks on 68 kickoffs. Gostkowski did so using a one-inch tee (the height of NFL tees), rather than the two-inch tees allowed by the NCAA at the time. Thus, NFL talent scouts could more accurately project his potential.

In a 2005 game against Houston, Gostkowski managed the rare feat of recovering his own onside kick.

== Professional career ==
=== New England Patriots ===
==== 2006 season ====
Gostkowski was selected by the New England Patriots in the fourth round of the 2006 NFL draft with the 118th overall pick. He was the first of two placekickers to be selected that year. During the Patriots' 2006 training camp, he competed with veteran kicker Martin Gramatica, who the Patriots had signed as a free agent after Adam Vinatieri signed with the Indianapolis Colts. On August 23, 2006, before their third preseason game, the Patriots cut Gramática, and gave the job to rookie Gostkowski.

During the 2006 preseason, Gostkowski was perfect on field goals and extra points, going 9-for-9 and 11-for-11, respectively, for a total of 38 points. His longest field goal was a 54-yard attempt against the New York Giants in the last preseason game. On November 26, 2006, Gostkowski made the longest regular-season kick of his young career, a 52-yard kick against the Chicago Bears, which is also the longest kick ever made at Gillette Stadium. Gostkowski finished the 2006 season as the highest-scoring rookie, with 103 points (20 field goals and 43 extra points), edging out the 96 points scored by Jacksonville running back Maurice Jones-Drew.

While Gostkowski struggled early in his rookie season—he had two consecutive kicks blocked—his kickoffs were noticeably longer than were Vinatieri's in his last season in Foxborough. During the 2006 season, he averaged 65.5 yards per kickoff with a return average of 23 yards, and a total of 12 touchbacks. (By comparison, in 2005, Vinatieri's average kickoff was just 61.6 yards, though playing in a dome in 2006 he averaged 65.8 yards.) Gostkowski also outperformed opposing teams on field goals: Gostkowski made 20 of 26 kicks (76.9%), while opposing kickers made just 22 of 30 (73.3%). Gostkowski's rookie season was statistically about the same as Vinatieri's: Vinatieri converted 27 of 35 kicks (77.3%), but missed three extra points (39/42). In Week 17, he missed an extra point attempt for the first time in his NFL career.

Gostkowski also had to contend with having three different holders during the season. After his first holder, punter Josh Miller, was placed on injured reserve after Week 11, the Patriots signed Ken Walter, who held for Weeks 12 to 15 until he was placed on injured reserve. Though the Patriots hired Todd Sauerbrun to punt, holding duties were given to the Patriots' backup quarterback Matt Cassel (which led to one regular-season kick that, while good, made two bizarre turns in mid-air).

===== 2006 postseason =====
In the Wild Card Round of the 2006 postseason against the New York Jets, Gostkowski was perfect on all his kick attempts, converting three field goal attempts (from 20, 40, and 28 yards) and four extra points. He also had one kickoff go through the back of the end zone (over 80 yards) for a touchback.

In the AFC Divisional Playoffs against the San Diego Chargers, Gostkowski made three of three field goals, including a 50-yard kick that was the longest successful kick in Patriots postseason history. He also made a 34-yarder in the third quarter and a 31-yard kick with 1:10 left in the fourth that made him only the third NFL rookie to attempt a game-winning playoff kick in the fourth quarter or overtime. (One of the others was Chargers kicker Nate Kaeding, who missed his attempt in the 2004 playoffs; in this game, Kaeding missed a potential game-tying 54-yarder in the closing seconds.) Gostkowski also converted his only extra point attempt of the game following a Jabar Gaffney touchdown in the second quarter.

In the AFC Championship, Gostkowski again converted all of his kicks (two field goals and four extra points), and recorded two touchbacks on kickoffs against the Indianapolis Colts.

==== Expectations from the Vinatieri years ====
As an untested rookie, Gostkowski faced special scrutiny in the playoffs, given the playoff heroics of Vinatieri. Gostkowski performed admirably, making all eight of his field goal kicks; he also recorded three touchbacks, including two in the Patriots' January 21, 2007, loss to the Colts at the RCA Dome.

==== 2007 season ====
Although Gostkowski ranked 30th in field goal attempts through the first 12 weeks of the NFL season (16 attempts, 14 converted), he managed to equal his entire 2006 scoring output in those 12 weeks, thanks to an NFL-leading 61 extra point attempts, all of which he converted. In Week 15, against the New York Jets, Gostkowski broke former Miami Dolphins kicker Uwe von Schamann's record for most extra points converted in a season, with his 67th successful attempt. In Week 16, against the Miami Dolphins, Gostkowski broke von Schamann's record of 70 extra point attempts. Gostkowski finished the season a perfect 74-for-74 on extra points, eclipsing Jeff Wilkins' 1999 record of 64-for-64 with the St. Louis Rams. (These PAT records were surpassed by Denver Broncos kicker Matt Prater in 2013.) Gostkowski also went 21 for 24 on field goals to finish with 137 points on the season, the third-highest total of any player that year (rookie Green Bay kicker Mason Crosby had 141, and Patriots receiver Randy Moss had 138).

Gostkowski also had the distinction, in the Week 13 game against the Baltimore Ravens, of kicking off from the Ravens' 35-yard line as the result of two unsportsmanlike conduct penalties on Ravens linebacker Bart Scott and an offside call on the Ravens defense on his PAT attempt. Gostkowski recorded a touchback on the kickoff, but there was confusion after the game as to whether or not the Patriots could have improved their field position by kicking the ball out-of-bounds instead.

===== 2007 postseason =====
Gostkowski had two field goal attempts in the postseason, both in the Divisional Round against the Jacksonville Jaguars; Gostkowski converted one, but missed the other, his only failed postseason conversion. He was 9-for-9 on his extra point attempts. In the AFC Championship victory over the San Diego Chargers, he converted all three extra point attempts. In Super Bowl XLII against the New York Giants, he converted both extra point attempts in the 17–14 loss.

==== 2008 season ====
Gostkowski was a key contributor in the Patriots' 19–10 win over the New York Jets in Week 2, the game that marked Matt Cassel's debut as a starter after a season-ending injury to Tom Brady. Gostkowski converted four field goals from 21, 37, 28, and 27 yards, and recorded touchbacks on the first five of his six kickoffs (the last kick was returned to the 20 before a Raymond Ventrone tackle).

In October, Gostkowski, after going 9-for-10 on field goals and 11-for-11 on extra points for a team-high 38 points, was named AFC Special Teams Player of the Month for the first time in his career.

In Week 16, Gostkowski had the highest-scoring game of his NFL career, converting four field goal attempts and five extra point attempts against the Arizona Cardinals. The 17-point performance gave him a total of 34 field goals on the season, breaking Tony Franklin's 1986 franchise record of 32, and 141 points scored, tying Vinatieri's post-merger franchise record, with one game still to play. (Former wide receiver/kicker Gino Cappelletti scored 155 points for the Patriots in 1964, and 147 points in 1961, but those include 44 and 56 points on receptions.) Gostkowski finished the season with a league-leading 148 points, the 13th-highest single-season total in NFL history; his 36 field goals converted is the sixth-best total, and the most since Neil Rackers made 40 in 2005.

In December 2008, Gostkowski was selected for his first Pro Bowl appearance as the AFC kicker; his selection was the result of the players' and coaches' votes, as he did not finish in the top five in fan voting. The Associated Press also voted him to the All-Pro First Team for the first time; he received 28 of the 50 votes for kicker.

==== 2009 season ====
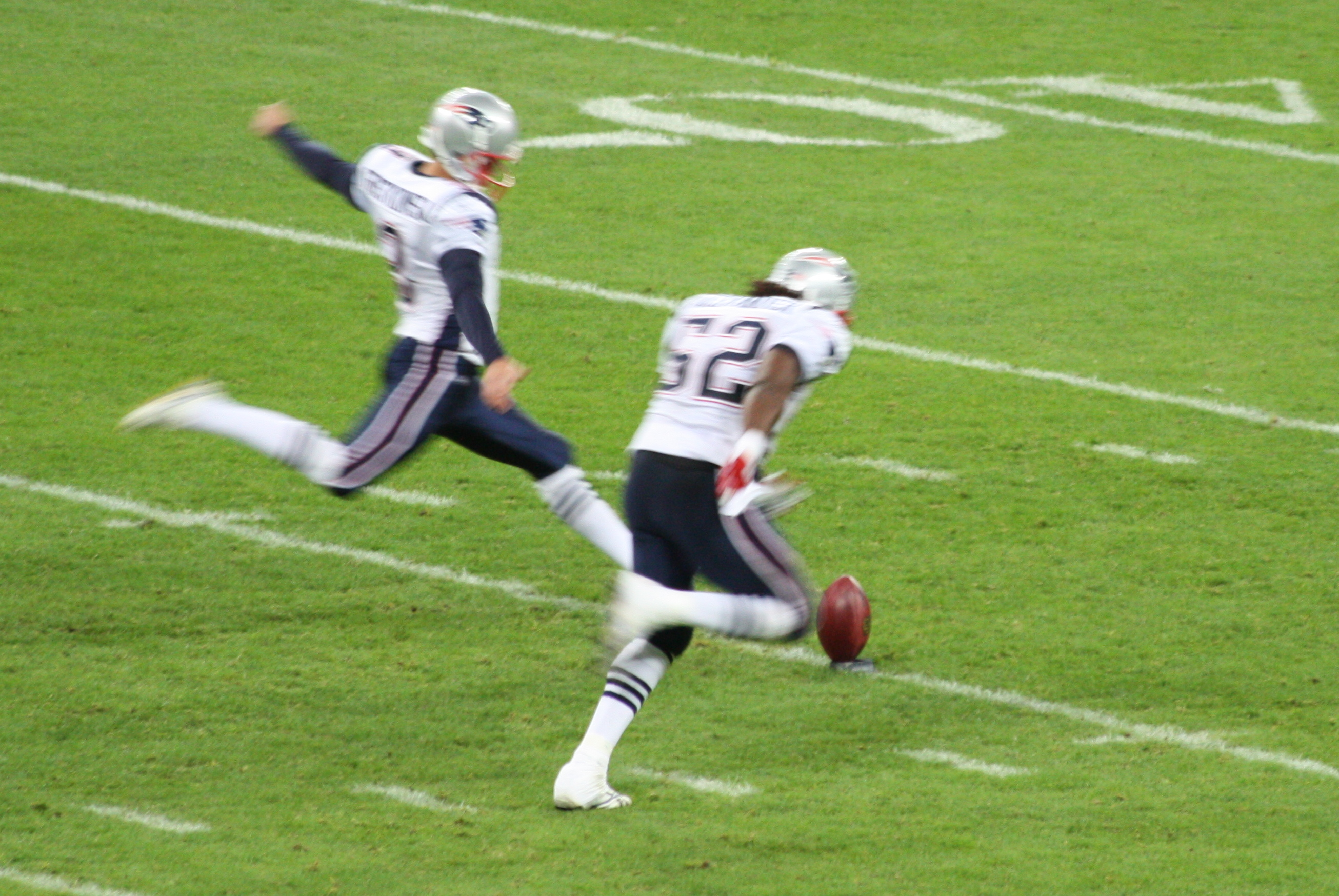
Gostkowski kicks off in October 2009.

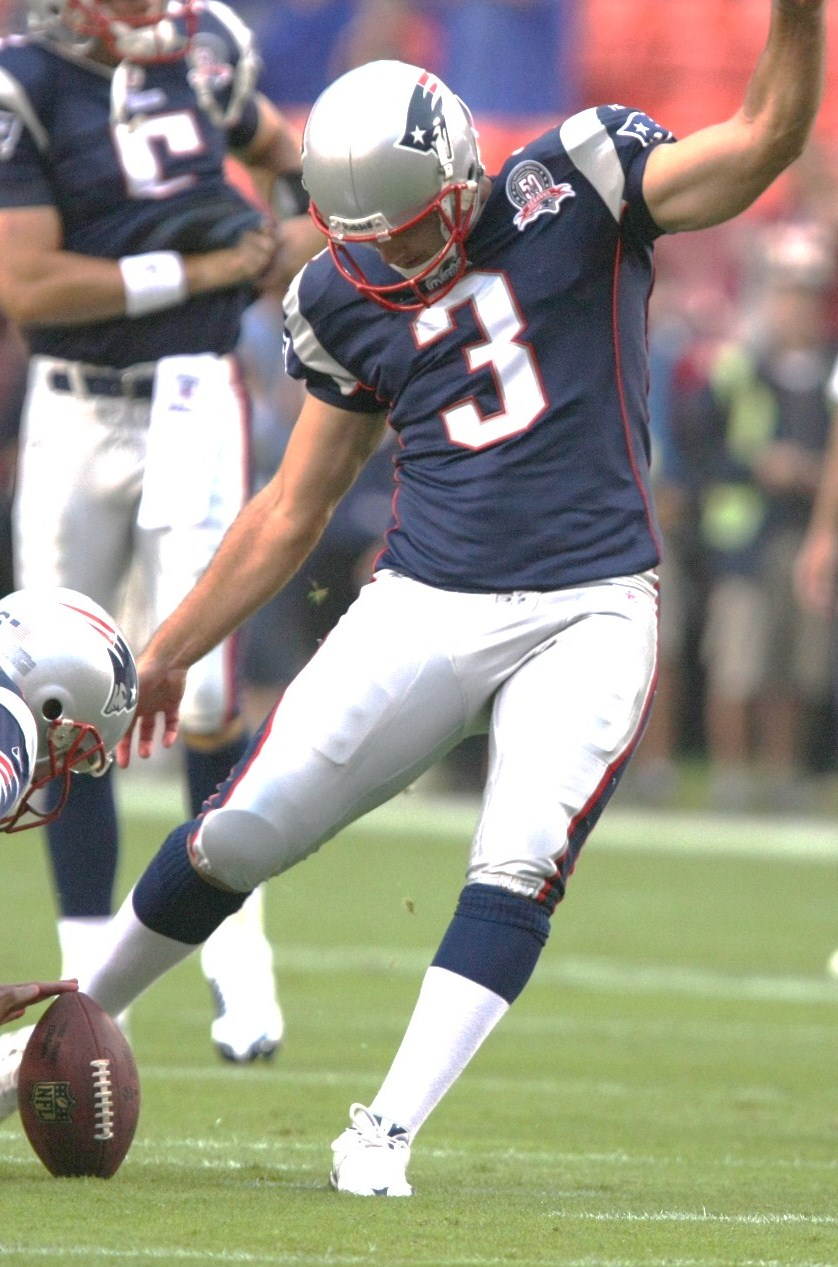
Gostkowski in the 2009 preseason

In the Patriots' last-minute 25–24 victory over the Buffalo Bills, Gostkowski recorded his first fumble recovery. When Leodis McKelvin fumbled the ball on a kickoff return, with the Patriots trailing 24–19, Gostkowski recovered the ball at the Bills' 31-yard line. Tom Brady, describing the play in his postgame press conference, used yet another nickname for Gostkowski: "Meat," a reference to Bull Durham, coined by former Patriots punter Josh Miller during Gostkowski's rookie season.

Gostkowski won his first AFC Special Teams Player of the Week award in the Patriots' Week 9 game against the Miami Dolphins, in which he recorded four field goals and two touchbacks, including one on a re-kick from the Patriots' 25-yard line following an offside penalty.

Gostkowski finished the season going 26-for-31 on field goals (83.9%). He was a perfect 47-for-47 on extra points and had a then-career-high 67.8 yard average on kickoffs.

==== 2010 season ====
Gostkowski's contract expired after the 2009 season, which normally would have made him an unrestricted free agent. As a result of the expiring NFL-NFLPA collective bargaining agreement, however, Gostkowski became a restricted free agent; the Patriots offered him $1,759,000 for the 2010 season. Gostkowski signed the tender on April 17. On August 26, 2010, the Patriots signed Gostkowski to a four-year extension, which added four years to his one-year tender contract; the extension gave him $14 million from 2011 to 2014, with $5 million guaranteed.

Gostkowski began the 2010 season missing three of his first four field goal attempts over two games. However, in Week 4, against the Miami Dolphins, Gostkowski recorded five touchbacks in a single game; two weeks later, Gostkowski kicked his first overtime game-winning field goal in the Patriots' 23–20 victory over the Baltimore Ravens.

In Week 9, Gostkowski was unable to finish the Patriots' game against the Cleveland Browns after sustaining a thigh injury; he was replaced by wide receiver Wes Welker. Three days later, on November 10, the Patriots placed Gostkowski on injured reserve with a torn quadriceps muscle, ending his season. The Patriots signed veteran kicker Shayne Graham to replace him.

Gostkowski finished the injury-shortened season 10-for-13 on field goals (76.9%, tying his career low from 2006), while setting a career-high with an average kickoff distance of 67.9 yards. He was 26-for-26 on his extra point attempts.

==== 2011 season ====
As Gostkowski recovered from his quadriceps injury, for the first time since his rookie season, he was not the only kicker in training camp; the Patriots brought in former University of Massachusetts kicker Chris Koepplin to help manage Gostkowski's workload; they released Koepplin before the start of the season.

In Week 16, after scoring a field goal against the Miami Dolphins to make the score 17–3 in favor of Miami, Gostkowski made a tackle of Clyde Gates on the subsequent kickoff that was credited as "pivotal" in the Patriots' comeback victory. Instead of allowing a touchdown, Gostkowski tackled Gates at the Miami 38. Miami lost the ball on the ensuing possession, and the Patriots went on to score a touchdown of their own, closing the deficit to 17–10 en route to a 27–24 win.

Gostkowski finished the season with 143 points, five short of his career high in 2007; he made 28 of 33 field goals and all 59 of his extra-point attempts. Gostkowski was one of two kickers to score five or more points in every game in 2011 (the other was David Akers), and the third player in NFL history to manage the feat (Gary Anderson also did it in 1998).

At the end of the 2011 season, Gostkowski and the Patriots appeared in Super Bowl XLVI. He converted two extra points and a field goal, but the Patriots lost 21–17 to the New York Giants.

==== 2012 season ====
In the 2012 season, Gostkowski converted all 66 extra point attempts and 29-of-35 field goal attempts. In Week 11, in the 59–24 victory over the Indianapolis Colts, he tied his career high, with eight extra points converted to go along with a 31-yard field goal. With 153 total points scored, he won the scoring title for the 2012 season.

==== 2013 season ====
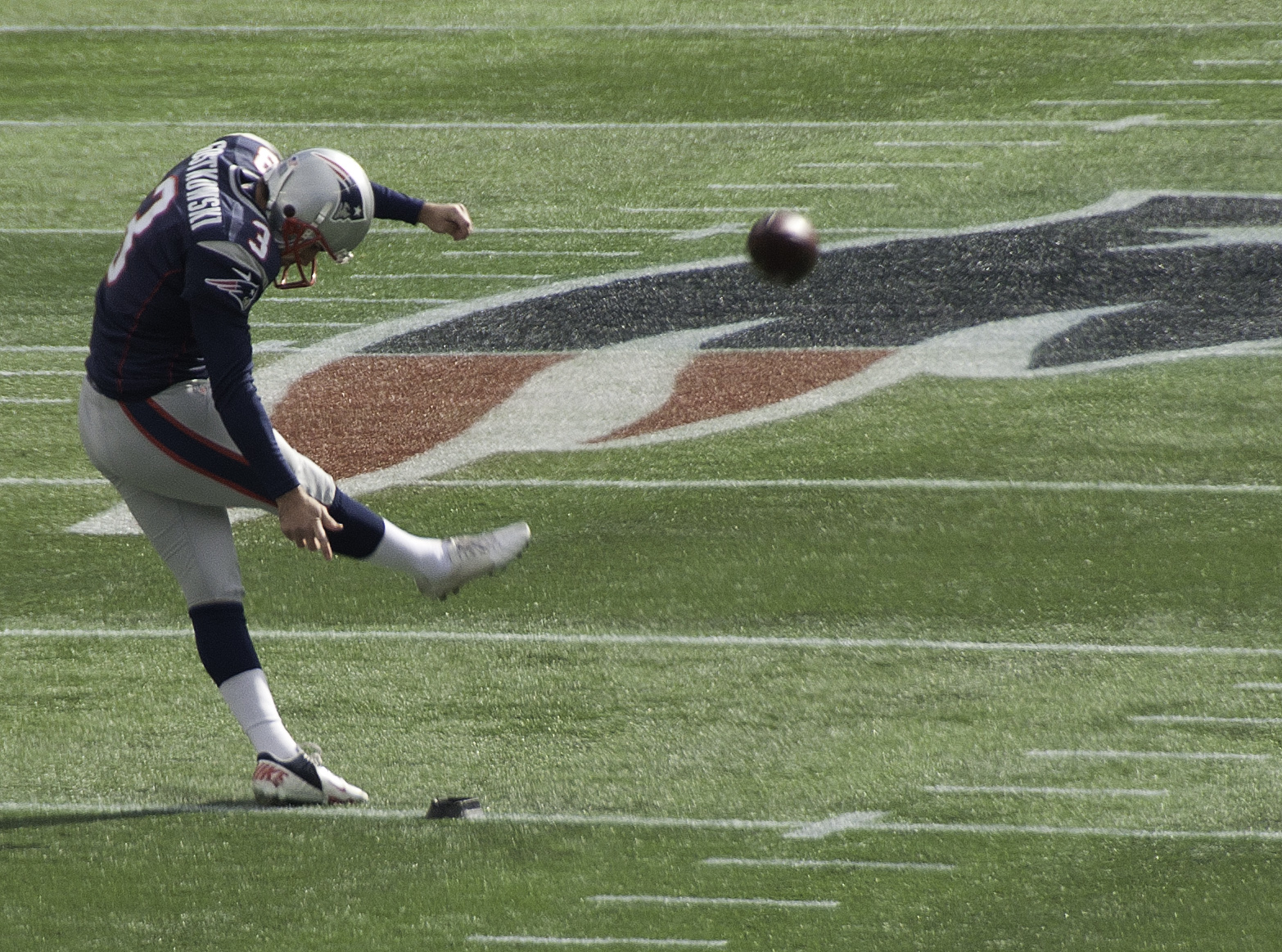
Gostkowski during the 2013 season

In the season opener against the Buffalo Bills, Gostkowski was a perfect 3–3, including the 35-yard game winning attempt. In week 12 against Peyton Manning and the high-scoring Denver Broncos, Gostkowski made both his field goal attempts, including the game winning 31-yard field goal with 1:56 remaining in overtime. Gostkowski set a franchise record for the New England Patriots for most field goals in a season with 38 field goals made out of 41 attempts. During the AFC Divisional Round against the Indianapolis Colts on January 11, 2014, Gostkowski took over the role of punter for the Patriots after regular punter Ryan Allen was injured during the second quarter, averaging 41.8 yards per punt. On January 20, 2014, he was named to his second Pro Bowl, replacing Denver Broncos kicker Matt Prater, who was playing in Super Bowl XLVIII.

==== 2014 season ====
Gostkowski scored three field goals against the Oakland Raiders in a 16–9 Week 3 victory; coincidentally, all the points in that game were scored by players whose names ended in "-kowski": all of Oakland's points were scored by Sebastian Janikowski, while the only touchdown in the game was scored by Patriots tight end Rob Gronkowski. In the Patriots' Week 15 41–13 rout of the Miami Dolphins, Gostkowski broke the Patriots' career scoring mark set by Vinatieri in 2005, doing so in just his 134th game as a Patriot.

Gostkowski finished the season with an NFL-leading 35 field goals out of 37 attempts (94.6%, a career-high). He was honored with his third Pro Bowl selection and was selected as a Second-Team All-Pro (behind Vinatieri). Gostkowski won his first Super Bowl ring when the Patriots defeated the Seattle Seahawks by a score of 28–24. He did not kick any field goals but made four extra points.

==== 2015 season ====
In a Week 3 victory over the Jacksonville Jaguars, Gostkowski recorded his 423rd consecutive extra point, breaking Matt Stover's record of 422. For the first three weeks, he converted all 14 extra point attempts and all seven field goal attempts, and was named AFC Special Teams Player of the Month for the third time in his career. During the Patriots' Week 5 game at AT&T Stadium versus the Dallas Cowboys, Gostkowski tied Vinatieri's franchise record kicking a 57-yard field goal to end the first half. Through the first five games of the season, Gostkowski was 12-for-12 on field goals and 21-for-21 on extra points. He added three more field goals on three tries in a 30–23 win over the New York Jets in Week 7 to start his season 15-for-15. Against the Miami Dolphins in a 36–7 win on October 29, he was four-for-four on extra points and two-for-two on field goals, including a 52-yarder. Against the New York Giants on November 15, with only one second remaining, he kicked the game-winning 54-yard field goal to get the 27–26 win, with the Patriots staying undefeated at 9–0 on the season. Additionally, he surpassed Adam Vinatieri on the Patriots' all-time leader in field goals. With the performance against the Giants, Gostkowski improved to 21-of-21 field goals made and 34-of-34 extra points made for the season. In week 11, in a 20–13 win over the Buffalo Bills, Gostkowski missed a 54-yard field goal attempt; it was his first miss since November 30, 2014, and his first miss at home since Week 2 of the 2013 season. He finished the season with 151 points, marking the fourth consecutive season he exceeded 150 points; no other player in NFL history has scored 150 points more than once.

Gostkowski was named one of two starting kickers for the 2015 Pro Bowl (along with Dallas Cowboys kicker Dan Bailey); it was Gostkowski's third consecutive nomination, and fourth overall. Gostkowski was also named the kicker on the 2015 AP All-Pro first team, receiving 47 of 50 votes; Bailey received the other three votes.

===== 2015 postseason =====
In the AFC Championship Game against the Denver Broncos, Gostkowski missed his first extra point since 2006 and only the second of his career, ending a streak of 523 consecutive successful attempts. After the Patriots were defeated 20–18 following a failed two-point conversion near the end of the game, Gostkowski blamed himself for the loss. However, Gostkowski, who also scored two field goals during the game, was defended by Patriots coach Bill Belichick and teammates Julian Edelman, Logan Ryan, Tom Brady, Rob Gronkowski, Danny Amendola, and Malcolm Butler. It was also his first miss in 56 attempts since the NFL moved the spot for extra points from the 2-yard line back to the 15-yard line.

Since The NFL Record & Fact Book does not count statistics from playoff games when calculating regular-season streaks, Gostkowski ended the regular season with his extra point streak active at 463.

==== 2016 season ====
During the 2016 offseason, the NFL changed the rule on kickoffs so that touchbacks would grant the offense an extra five yards, with possessions starting at the 25-yard line rather than the 20-yard line. The Patriots took advantage of Gostkowski's ability to deliver "mortar kicks" that have a long hang time but land inside the field of play, which then forces the opposing team to attempt to return the kick. In the Patriots' Week 1 upset of the Arizona Cardinals, the Patriots used such a kick to force the Cardinals to start their final drive, which ended in a missed field goal, at their own eight-yard line. While against the Houston Texans in Week 3, the Patriots forced two fumbles on such kickoffs. He earned Special Teams Player of the Week in Week 13 for making all four field goal attempts including three over 45 yards and converted two extra points.

Gostkowski missed an extra point in Week 6 against the Cincinnati Bengals to end his record regular-season streak at 479. He finished the season tied for eighth in scoring with 127 points (27 of 32 field goals and 46 of 49 extra points); making the 2016 season the first time since 2011 that Gostkowski did not lead the NFL in scoring.

Gostkowski appeared in a Pepsi commercial during the 2017 playoffs, joining the ranks of wide receivers Odell Beckham Jr. and Antonio Brown.

Gostkowski became the first placekicker in Super Bowl history to start at placekicker for the winning team without kicking an extra point. In Super Bowl LI, Gostkowski missed the extra point on the Patriots' first touchdown, the Patriots successfully attempted two-point conversions on their second and third touchdowns, and the Patriots' final, game-winning touchdown came in overtime, so no extra point was needed. In the 34–28 overtime victory over the Atlanta Falcons, Gostkowski hit on a 41-yard attempt in the second quarter and a 33-yard attempt in the fourth quarter.

==== 2017 season ====
During a Week 4 33–30 loss to the Carolina Panthers, Gostkowski set a new franchise record by making a 58-yard field goal, breaking the 57-yard record he shared with Adam Vinatieri. He broke that record in the Patriots' Week 11 game against the Oakland Raiders at Estadio Azteca in Mexico City, kicking a 62-yard field goal as time expired in the first half of the 33–8 victory. That kick was tied for the sixth-longest field goal in NFL history. In that game, Gostkowski booted four field goals, earning him AFC Special Teams Player of the Week.

In the 2017 regular season, Gostkowski was 45-of-47 on extra point attempts and 37-of-40 on field goal attempts. His 156 points was the second highest total of any player in the NFL, behind only the Los Angeles Rams' Greg Zuerlein. It was the fifth time Gostkowski had eclipsed the 150-point mark in his career.

Gostkowski played in Super Bowl LII, tying the record with former Patriot Adam Vinatieri to appear in five Super Bowls as a kicker. The Patriots failed to repeat as Super Bowl Champions after losing 41–33 to the Philadelphia Eagles. In the Super Bowl, Gostkowski made two field goals and three extra points but also missed a field goal and an extra point in the second quarter.

==== 2018 season ====
Gostkowski finished sixth in the league among kickers with 130 points scored. He set a record for most Super Bowl appearances by a kicker, at six, breaking his tie with former Patriot Adam Vinatieri.

During Super Bowl LIII against the Los Angeles Rams, Gostkowski missed a field goal and made two during the Patriots win over the Rams. He kicked a 41-yard field goal with less than two minutes left in the game to give the Patriots a 13–3 lead, essentially sealing the victory for the Patriots.

==== 2019 season: Final year in New England ====
On April 9, 2019, Gostkowski re-signed with the Patriots on a two-year, $8.5 million deal.

On October 2, 2019, as a result of a left hip injury he sustained, Gostkowski was placed on injured reserve for the second time in his 14-year career. Mike Nugent was signed as his replacement, but was eventually released. Nick Folk was brought in to assume the kicking duties, but was then also released and replaced by Kai Forbath. Folk eventually ended up being re-signed by the Patriots as their main kicker.

On March 23, 2020, Gostkowski was released by the Patriots after 14 seasons with the team.

=== Tennessee Titans ===
On September 3, 2020, the Tennessee Titans signed Gostkowski on a one-year deal. Gostkowski was a teammate of Titans head coach Mike Vrabel from 2006 to 2008, when Vrabel played linebacker for the Patriots.

During the season opener on the road against the Denver Broncos, Gostkowski struggled, missing three field goals and an extra point. However, with 17 seconds left in the game, Gostkowski kicked a game-winning field goal, putting the Titans up 16–14. In the next game against the Jacksonville Jaguars, Gostkowski made three of four extra points and two field goals, including a 49-yard game-winner late during the fourth quarter of the 33–30 victory. Gostkowski was crucial to the Titans' Week 3 narrow 31–30 road victory over the Minnesota Vikings, making all six of his field goals, including another game-winner late in the fourth quarter, this time from 55 yards out. He was named the AFC Special Teams Player of the Week for his performance in Week 3. On October 1, 2020, Gostkowski was named the AFC Special Teams Player of the Month for his performance in September.

After not attempting a field goal in the first five weeks of the regular season, Gostkowski made only one of five attempted field goals in Weeks 6–8, notably missing a 45-yard game-tying field goal with 19 seconds left in the fourth quarter of a 24–27 loss to the Pittsburgh Steelers in Week 7. Had Gostkowski made the kick, the game would have likely been sent into overtime. However, he would only miss one of his nine attempted field goals in Weeks 9–16. Gostkowski did not play in the regular season finale against the Houston Texans due to being placed on the reserve/COVID-19 list and was replaced by rookie Sam Sloman.

The Titans won the AFC South with an 11–5 record, with Gostkowski finishing the season making 18 of 26 field goals and making 44 of 46 extra points, with the only missed extra points being from the first two games of the season. Gostkowski was later removed from the reserve/COVID-19 list and was cleared to return for the playoffs, making his two attempted field goals and lone extra point as the Titans lost 20–13 to the Baltimore Ravens during the Wild Card Round.

Gostkowski was not re-signed by the Titans following the 2020 season, making him a free agent going into the 2021 season.

=== Retirement ===
Gostkowski retired during the 2022 season after 15 seasons due to a persistent knee injury.

== Career statistics ==
Legend
	Won the Super Bowl
	Led the league
**Bold**	Career high

=== NFL ===
==== Regular season ====
Year	Team	GP	Field goals									Extra points			Points
Year	Team	GP	FGM	FGA	FG%	<20	20−29	30−39	40−49	50+	Lng	XPM	XPA	XP%	Points
2006	NE	16	20	26	76.9	0–0	10–11	7–10	2–4	1–1	52	43	44	97.7	103
2007	NE	16	21	24	87.5	0–0	10–10	8–9	3–5	0–0	45	**74**	**74**	**100.0**	137
2008	NE	16	36	40	90.0	0–0	10–12	**16–16**	9–11	1–1	50	40	40	**100.0**	148
2009	NE	16	26	31	83.9	0–0	7–7	12–13	5–8	2–3	53	47	47	**100.0**	125
2010	NE	8	10	13	76.9	0–0	2–2	6–7	2–3	0–1	43	26	26	**100.0**	56
2011	NE	16	28	33	84.8	**1–1**	12–13	5–6	9–11	1–2	50	59	59	**100.0**	143
2012	NE	16	29	35	82.9	0–0	8–8	10–12	9–13	2–2	53	66	66	**100.0**	153
2013	NE	16	**38**	**41**	92.7	**1–1**	8–8	13–13	11–13	5–6	54	44	44	**100.0**	**158**
2014	NE	16	35	37	**94.6**	**1–1**	11–11	10–11	**12–13**	1–1	53	51	51	**100.0**	156
2015	NE	16	33	36	91.7	0–0	6–6	11–11	12–14	4–5	57	52	52	**100.0**	151
2016	NE	16	27	32	84.4	0–0	9–9	7–9	9–10	2–4	53	46	49	93.9	127
2017	NE	16	37	40	92.5	0–0	**16–16**	9–9	8–11	4–4	**62**	45	47	95.7	156
2018	NE	16	27	32	84.4	0–0	11–11	10–10	4–6	2–5	52	49	50	98.0	130
2019	NE	4	7	8	87.5	0–0	3–3	3–3	1–2	0–0	41	11	15	73.3	32
2020	TEN	15	18	26	69.2	0–0	2–3	4–5	5–10	**7–8**	55	46	48	95.8	100
Total		219	392	454	86.3	3–3	124–129	132–145	101–134	32–43	62	699	712	98.2	1,875

==== Postseason ====
Year	Team	GP	Field goals									Extra points			Points
Year	Team	GP	FGM	FGA	FG%	<20	20−29	30−39	40−49	50+	Lng	XPM	XPA	XP%	Points
2006	NE	3	**8**	**8**	**100.0**	0–0	3–3	2–2	2–2	**1–1**	**50**	9	9	**100.0**	**33**
2007	NE	3	1	2	50.0	0–0	0–0	1–2	0–0	0–0	35	9	9	**100.0**	12
2009	NE	1	0	1	0.0	0–0	0–0	0–0	0–1	0–0	—	2	2	**100.0**	2
2011	NE	3	5	5	**100.0**	0–0	**4–4**	1–1	0–0	0–0	35	10	10	**100.0**	25
2012	NE	2	4	4	**100.0**	0–0	1–1	**3–3**	0–0	0–0	38	6	6	**100.0**	18
2013	NE	2	1	1	**100.0**	0–0	0–0	0–0	1–1	0–0	47	6	6	**100.0**	9
2014	NE	3	1	1	**100.0**	0–0	1–1	0–0	0–0	0–0	21	**15**	**15**	**100.0**	18
2015	NE	2	4	4	**100.0**	0–0	0–0	2–2	2–2	0–0	46	3	4	75.0	15
2016	NE	3	7	7	**100.0**	**1–1**	1–1	2–2	**3–3**	0–0	47	7	9	77.8	28
2017	NE	3	3	5	60.0	0–0	1–2	1–1	1–1	0–1	45	11	12	91.7	20
2018	NE	3	5	6	83.3	0–0	1–1	1–1	3–4	0–0	47	10	10	**100.0**	25
2019	NE	0	Did not play due to injury												
2020	TEN	1	2	2	**100.0**	0–0	1–1	0–0	1–1	0–0	45	1	1	**100.0**	7
Total		29	41	46	89.1	1–1	13–14	13–14	13–15	1–2	50	89	93	95.7	212

=== College ===
Year	School	Conf	Class	Pos	G	Kicking						
Year	School	Conf	Class	Pos	G	**XPM**	**XPA**	**XP%**	**FGM**	**FGA**	**FG%**	**Pts**
2002	Memphis	CUSA	FR	K	12	32	37	86.5	9	14	64.3	59
2003	Memphis	CUSA	SO	K	13	44	44	**100.0**	19	**29**	65.5	101
2004	Memphis	CUSA	JR	K	12	**48**	**49**	98.0	20	24	83.3	**108**
2005	Memphis	CUSA	SR	K	12	35	35	**100.0**	**22**	25	**88.0**	101
**Career**	**Memphis**				**49**	**159**	**165**	**96.4**	**70**	**92**	**76.1**	**369**

== Personal life ==
Gostkowski and his wife Hallie met when they were both attending the University of Memphis; they married in 2008. Hallie works as a nurse at a Boston hospital and the couple lives in Wrentham, Massachusetts, with their three children.

In 2025, Gostkowski was inducted into the National Polish-American Sports Hall of Fame.
