= Hans Raff =

German middle-distance runner

Personal information
- Full name: Hans Heinrich Raff
- Nationality: German
- Born: 30 October 1910
- Died: 13 May 1990 (aged 79)

Sport
- Sport: Middle-distance running
- Event: Steeplechase

Hans Heinrich Raff (30 October 1910 – 13 May 1990) was a German middle-distance runner. He competed in the men's 3000 metres steeplechase at the 1936 Summer Olympics.
