= Tetsuo Imai =

Japanese middle-distance runner

Personal information
- Nationality: Japanese
- Born: 20 May 1912 Kashiwazaki, Japan
- Died: 27 December 1987 (aged 75)

Sport
- Sport: Middle-distance running
- Event: Steeplechase

Tetsuo Imai (今井 哲夫, Imai Tetsuo; 20 May 1912 – 27 December 1987) was a Japanese middle-distance runner. He competed in the men's 3000 metres steeplechase at the 1936 Summer Olympics.
