= Willi Heyn =

German middle-distance runner

Personal information
- Full name: Wilhelm Heyn
- Nationality: German
- Born: 13 November 1910 Gunzenhausen, German Empire
- Died: 31 October 1977 (aged 66) Bayreuth, West Germany

Sport
- Sport: Middle-distance running
- Event: Steeplechase

Wilhelm Heyn (13 November 1910 – 31 October 1977) was a German middle-distance runner. He competed in the men's 3000 metres steeplechase at the 1936 Summer Olympics.
