= Václav Hošek =

Czech middle-distance runner

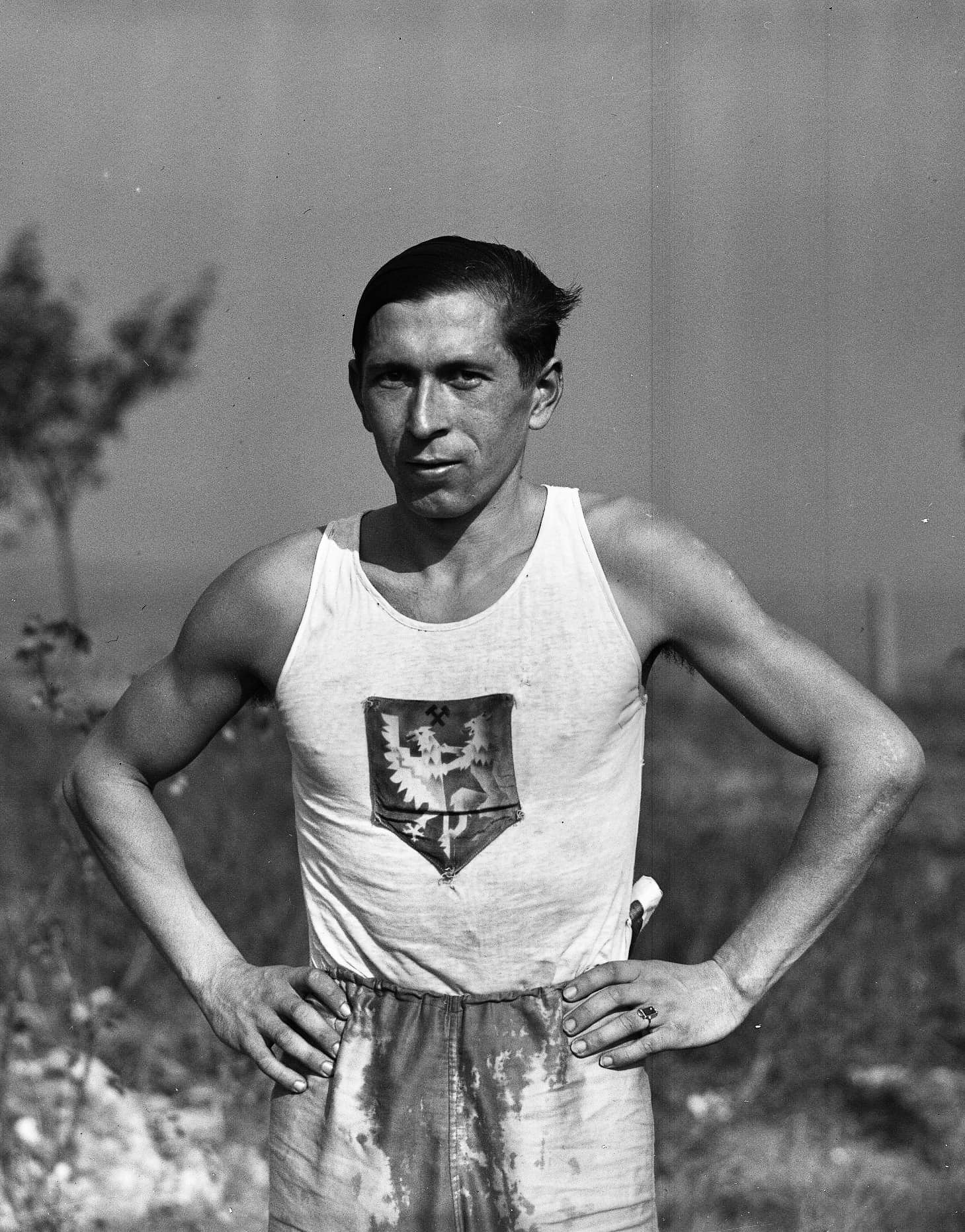
- Picture of Václav Hošek, taken before 1942

Personal information
- Nationality: Czech
- Born: 18 August 1909 Unhošť, Austria-Hungary
- Died: June 1943 (aged 33) Bayreuth, Nazi Germany

Sport
- Sport: Middle-distance running
- Event: Steeplechase

Václav Hošek (18 August 1909 – June 1943) was a Czech middle-distance runner. He competed in the men's 3000 metres steeplechase at the 1936 Summer Olympics. During World War II, he was captured by the Gestapo and was later shot when he attempted to escape from a prisoner-of-war camp.
