= Harry Ekman (athlete) =

Swedish athletics competitor

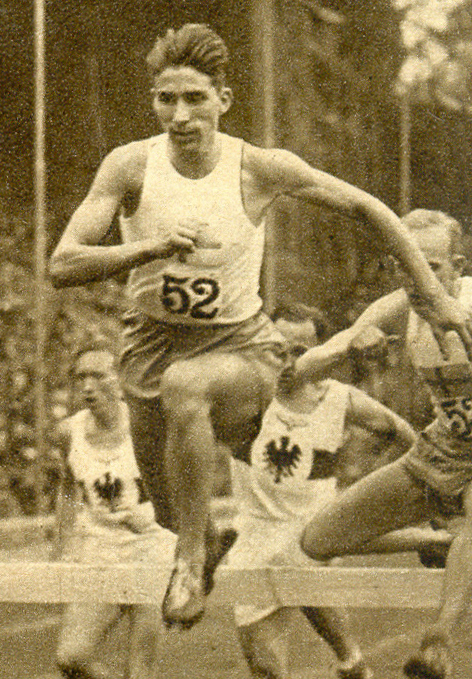

Personal information
- Born: 21 September 1908 Lidingö, Sweden
- Died: 28 August 1979 (aged 70) Västerfärnebo, Sweden

Sport
- Sport: Athletics
- Events: Steeplechase, 5000 m, 10,000 m
- Club: Fredrikshofs IF, Stockholm

Achievements and titles
- Personal bests: 3000 mS – 9:18.4 (1936); 5000 m – 14:54.4 (1934); 10,000 m – 31:55.6 (1934)

John Harry Ekman (21 September 1908 – 28 August 1979) was a middle and long-distance runner from Sweden. He competed in the 3000 m steeplechase at the 1936 Summer Olympics, but failed to reach the final.
