= ASSI Giglio Rosso =

Italian athletic association

- Type: Athletics club
- Founded: 14 April 1922
- Location: Florence
- League(s): Italian Athletics Clubs Championships
- Affiliations: Italian Athletics Federation
- Colours: red & white
- Website: www.assigigliorosso.it

The ASSI Giglio Rosso is an Italian athletics club based in Florence, via Michelangelo nº64.

== Achievements ==
ASSI Giglio Rosso won 5 editions of the women's Italian Championships in Athletics for clubs (Campionati italiani di società di atletica leggera).

- 5 wins (1931, 1932, 1933, 1934, 1936)

== Main athletes ==
Below are some of the most important athletes in Florentine society.

Men

- Arturo Maffei
- Bruno Betti
- Nello Bartolini
- Giuseppe Lippi
- Silvano Meconi
- Riccardo Fortini
- Giacomo Poggi
- Alessandro Pezzatini
- Gianni Stecchi
- Stefano Grazzini
- Gianni Japichino
- Luca Vandi

Women

- Alessandra Becatti

== See also ==
- Athletics in Italy
