= Chris Koepplin =

American football player (born 1985)

No. 13
- Position: Placekicker

Personal information
- Born: October 11, 1985 (age 41); Kings Park, New York
- Listed height: 6 ft 3 in (1.91 m)
- Listed weight: 210 lb (95 kg)

Career information
- High school: South Huntington (NY) St. Anthony's
- College: Massachusetts
- NFL draft: 2008: undrafted

Career history
- Manchester Wolves (2008–2009); New England Patriots (2011–2012)*; Buffalo Bills (2013)*
- * Offseason or practice squad member only
- Stats at Pro Football Reference

Christopher Stanley Koepplin (born October 11, 1985) is an American former football placekicker for the Buffalo Bills of the National Football League (NFL). He was only a member of the practice squad. Koepplin played college football at the University of Massachusetts.

== Early life ==
Koepplin attended St. Anthony's High School in South Huntington, New York. He played football only in his senior season, but went 31 of 32 on extra point attempts.

== College career ==
Koepplin attended Boston University in his first year of college and served as a manager for the men's basketball team. Koepplin then attended Nassau Community College for two seasons. Koepplin then played his junior and senior seasons at the University of Massachusetts and served as the team's primary kicker in 2006 and 2007. As a junior. Koepplin hit 51-of-52 points after touchdown and was 16-of-23 on field goal attempts. He was named a Second-team All Atlantic 10 kicker. As a senior, Koepplin was 48-of-49 on points after touchdown and 11-of-15 on field goal attempts, with a long field goal of 51 yards, the second longest in school history. Following his senior season Koepplin was named a Colonial Athletic Association third-team kicker. He finished his career ranked first in school history in field goals during a season (16), points by kicker during a season (99), and points after touchdown during a season(51).

== Professional career ==
After his college career, Koepplin did not receive any interest from National Football League teams. However, he spent the 2008 and 2009 seasons with the Manchester Wolves of the Arena Football League's developmental league before the team folded following the 2009 season. Koepplin attended kicking camps in 2010 but was unable to draw interest from professional teams and went to work as a personal trainer at Gold's Gym. On July 25, 2011 the NFL lockout ended and teams scrambled to find players to fill rosters for training camp. With starting kicker Stephen Gostkowski coming off a leg injury, the New England Patriots signed Koepplin to handle kickoff duties in pre-season, but he did not make the final roster. Koepplin was signed by the Patriots again in 2012, but was once again cut during training camp. In April, 2013 Koepplin was signed by the Buffalo Bills in order to attend their training camp and compete with veteran Rian Lindell for the starting job. He was cut by the Bills as well
