= Ladislaus Simacek =

Austrian athlete

Personal information
- Full name: Ladislaus Adalbert Simacek
- Nationality: Austrian
- Born: 20 November 1913 Vienna, Austria-Hungary
- Died: 19 March 2004 (aged 90) Vienna, Austria

Sport
- Sport: Athletics
- Event: Steeplechase running

Ladislaus Adalbert Simacek (20 November 1913 – 19 March 2004) was an Austrian steeplechase runner. He competed in the men's 3000 metres steeplechase at the 1936 Summer Olympics.
