= Verner Toivonen =

Finnish middle-distance runner

Personal information
- Nationality: Finnish
- Born: 7 June 1908
- Died: 19 February 2004 (aged 95)

Sport
- Sport: Middle-distance running
- Event: Steeplechase

Verner Toivonen (7 June 1908 – 19 February 2004) was a Finnish middle-distance runner. He competed in the men's 3000 metres steeplechase at the 1932 Summer Olympics.
