= Roger Cuzol =

French middle-distance runner

Personal information
- Born: 18 August 1916 Clermont-Ferrand, France
- Died: 19 February 1962 (aged 45) Clermont-Ferrand, France

Sport
- Sport: Middle-distance running
- Event: Steeplechase
- Club: Métropolitain Club Colombes

Roger Cuzol (18 August 1916 – 19 February 1962) was a French middle-distance runner. He competed in the men's 3000 metres steeplechase at the 1936 Summer Olympics.
