= Lars Larsson (athlete) =

Swedish steeplechase runner (1911–1993)

Lennart Andersson
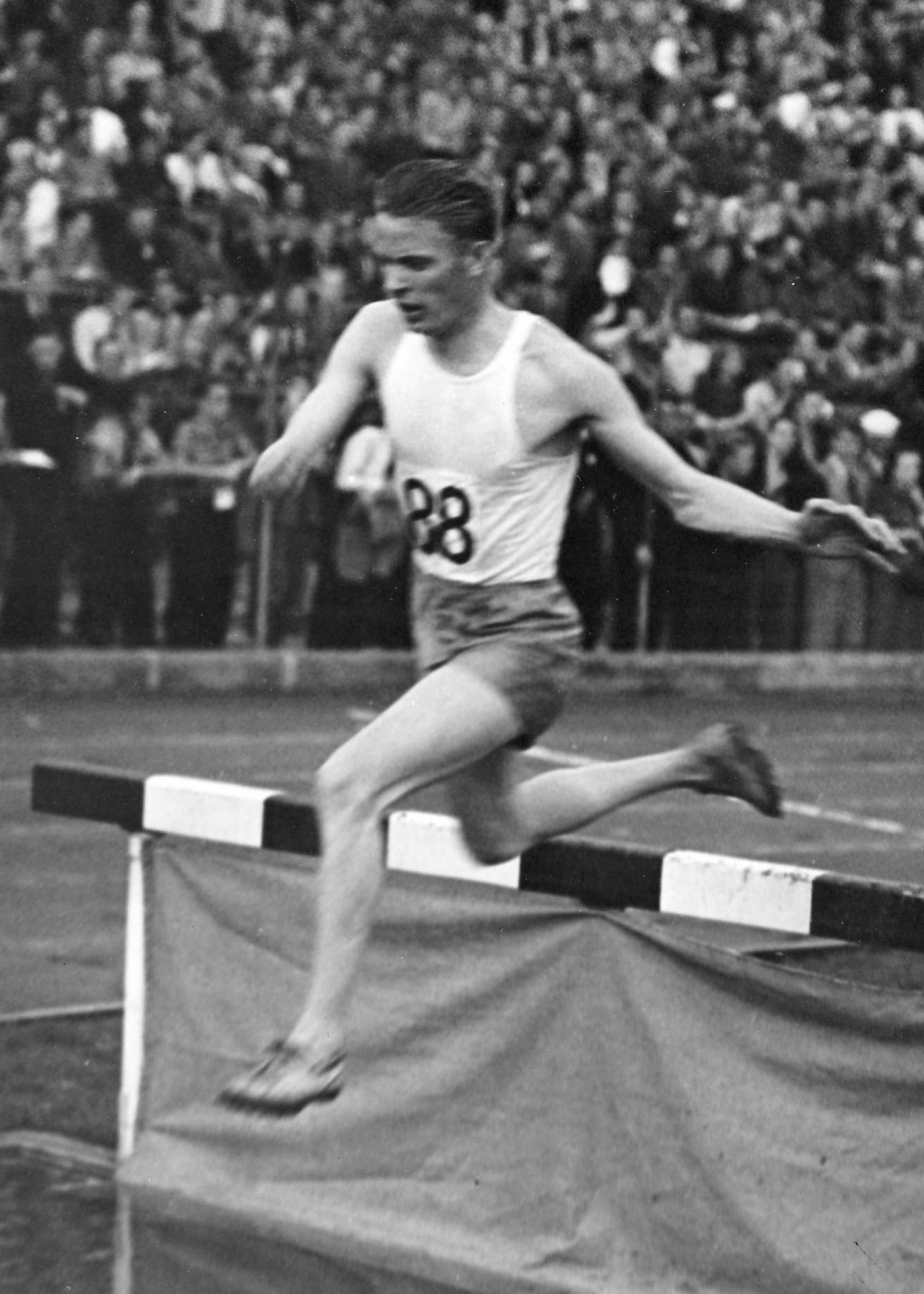

Personal information
- Born: 17 June 1911 Lidingö, Sweden
- Died: 29 January 1993 (aged 81) Lidingö, Sweden
- Height: 1.80 m (5 ft 11 in)
- Weight: 70 kg (154 lb)

Sport
- Sport: Athletics
- Event: Steeplechase
- Club: IFK Lidingö

Achievements and titles
- Personal best: 3000 mS – 9:07.0 (1940)
Medal record
Men's athletics
Representing Sweden
European Championships
Gold medal – first place	1938 Paris	3000 m st.

Lars Axel Larsson (17 June 1911 – 29 January 1993) was a Swedish steeplechase runner. He finished sixth at the 1936 Summer Olympics and won a European title in 1938.

Larsson started as a flat runner and changed to steeplechase in 1936. That year he won the Swedish steeplechase title while finishing second in the 5,000 m. He went on winning the steeplechase title in 1937–40, improving the national record three times, from 9:16.6 in 1936 to 9:09.0 in 1939. He retired in 1941 due to a leg injury and later worked as an office clerk.
