= Giuseppe Lippi =

Italian runner (1904–1978)

Personal information
- Nationality: Italian
- Born: 15 April 1904 Florence, Italy
- Died: 18 May 1978 (aged 74) Florence, Italy
- Height: 1.65 m (5 ft 5 in)
- Weight: 55 kg (121 lb)

Sport
- Country: Italy
- Sport: Athletics
- Events: Long distance running 3000 metres steeplechase
- Club: Giglio Rosso Firenze

Achievements and titles
- Personal bests: 5000 m: 15:11.8 (1930); 10000 m: 30:27.4 (1940); 3000 m st: 9:32.0 (1932)

Giuseppe Lippi (15 April 1904 – 18 May 1978) was an Italian long distance runner and steeplechaser. He was born and died in Florence.

== Biography ==
Lippi participated at two editions of the Summer Olympics (1932 and 1936). He earned 20 caps with the national team from 1925 to 1940. He was a friend of the Italian cyclist Gino Bartali.

== Achievements ==
Year	Competition	Venue	Position	Event	Performance	Note
1932	Olympic Games	(United States) Los Angeles	11th	3000 metres steeeplechase	11:04.0	
1936	Olympic Games	(Germany) Berlin	Heat	3000 metres steeeplechase	-	

== National titles ==
Giuseppe Lippi has won 15 times the individual national championship.

- 1 win in 5000 metres (1932)
- 2 wins in 10000 metres (1938, 1939)
- 5 wins in 3000 metres steeplechase (1933, 1935, 1936, 1940, 1948)
- 7 wins in Cross country running (1925, 1927, 1928, 1929, 1930, 1937, 1938)

== See also ==
- Italian Athletics Championships - Multi winners
- 5000 metres winners of Italian Athletics Championships
- 10000 metres winners of Italian Athletics Championships
