= Jukka Matilainen =

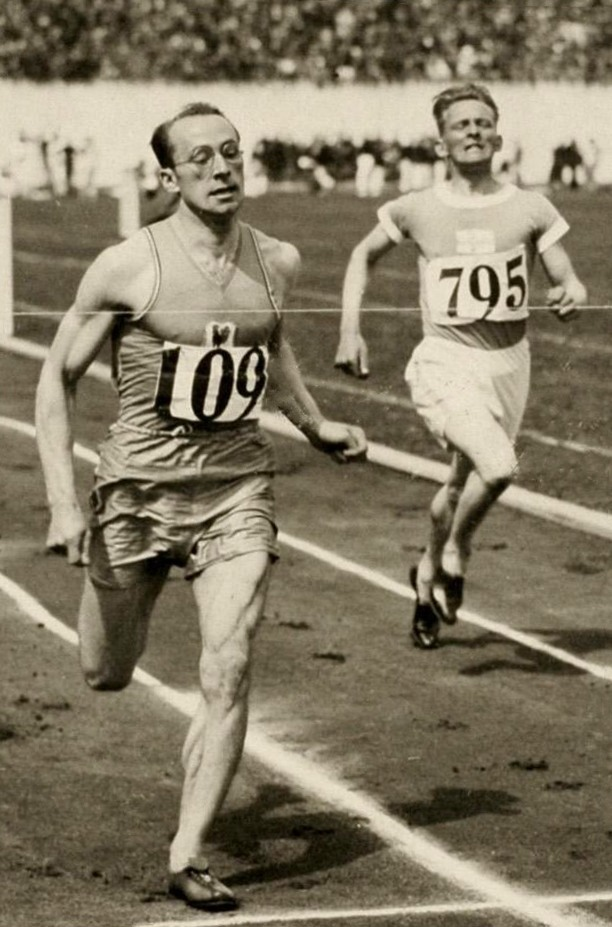
- Jukka Matilainen (right) at the 1928 Olympics

Personal information
- Full name: Johan Aadolf Matilainen
- Born: 20 December 1901 Mikkeli, Finland
- Died: 1 November 1967 (aged 65)
- Height: 1.76 m (5 ft 9 in)
- Weight: 68 kg (150 lb)

Sport
- Sport: Hurdling
- Club: Iisalmen Visa, Iisalmi

Johan Aadolf "Jukka" Matilainen (20 December 1901 – 1 November 1967) was a Finnish runner. He competed at the 1928 Olympics in the 400 m hurdles, but failed to reach the final. His brothers Kalle and Martti were also Olympic runners, but in longer-distance events.
