= Alfredo Furia =

Italian steeplechase runner (1906–1936)

Personal information
- Nationality: Italian
- Born: 19 January 1906 Parma, Italy
- Died: 9 November 1936 (aged 30)

Sport
- Country: Italy
- Sport: Athletics
- Event: 3000 metres steeplechase

Alfredo Furia (19 January 1906 – 9 November 1936) was an Italian male steeplechase runner who competed at the 1932 Summer Olympics.
