= Walter Pritchard =

American track and field Olympian

Walter H. Pritchard
Personal information
- Nationality: American
- Born: April 14, 1910 Hancock, New York
- Died: August 31, 1982 (aged 72) Cleveland, Ohio, United States

Sport
- Sport: Athletics
- Event: 3000 meter steeplechase
- College team: Hamilton College (1929–1932)

Walter Herbert Pritchard (April 14, 1910, Hancock, New York – August 31, 1982) was an American track and field Olympian and cardiologist. He is credited with contributing to the science of cardiac resuscitation and defibrillation to restart the human heart.

== Athletic career ==
Pritchard broke the American record in the 3000 meter steeplechase on July 16, 1932 while qualifying for the 1932 Los Angeles Olympics at the U.S. Olympic Trials. Fordham's Joseph McCluskey won the trials that day and ultimately held the American record. Pritchard would go on to finish eighth in the Olympics later that summer in a race that is considered one of the biggest errors in Olympic history. Officials incorrectly counted the number of laps completed and forced runners to complete an extra lap. In honor of Pritchard, Hamilton College, where Pritchard attended college, named the track and field facility after him.

== Cardiology career ==
He graduated from Harvard Medical School. After college Pritchard became a preeminent cardiologist. He helped develop the science of cardiac resuscitation and defibrillation to restart the human heart. During his career he was Director of Cardiology and Chief of Staff at the University Hospitals of Cleveland and Argyl J. Beams Professor of Medicine at the Case Western Reserve University.
