= Kalle Matilainen (runner) =

Finnish long-distance runner

Personal information
- Born: 28 September 1899 Mikkeli, Finland
- Died: 28 June 1985 (aged 85) Pohjois-Savo, Finland
- Height: 1.67 m (5 ft 6 in)
- Weight: 58 kg (128 lb)

Sport
- Sport: Running
- Club: Iisalmen Visa, Iisalmi

Kalle Aukusti Matilainen (28 September 1899 – 28 June 1985) was a Finnish runner. He competed at the 1928 Olympics in the 10,000 m event and finished in eighth place. His younger brothers Jukka and Martti were also Olympic runners.
