= Alfred Dompert =

Athletics competitor

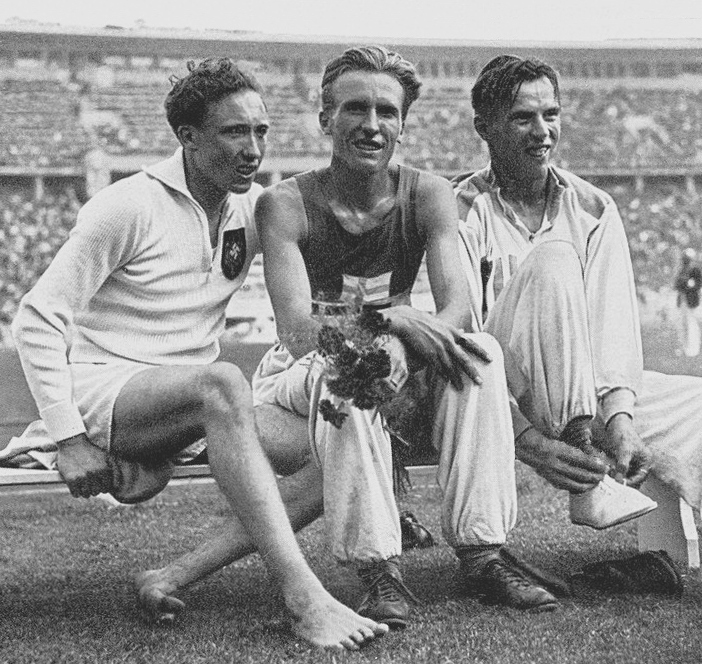
- Dompert (left) at the 1936 Olympics

Personal information
- Born: 23 December 1914 Stuttgart, Germany
- Died: 11 August 1991 (aged 76) Stuttgart, Germany
- Height: 174 cm (5 ft 9 in)
- Weight: 60 kg (132 lb)

Sport
- Sport: Athletics
- Event(s): 1500 m, steeplechase
- Club: Stuttgarter Kickers

Achievements and titles
- Personal best(s): 1500 m – 3:55.4 (1941); 3000 mS – 9:07.2 (1936)
Medal record
Representing Germany
Olympic Games
| Bronze medal – third place | 1936 Berlin | 3000 m steeplechase |

Alfred Dompert (23 December 1914 – 11 August 1991) was a German runner who won a bronze medal in the 3000 m steeplechase at the 1936 Summer Olympics. He was the German champion in this event in 1937, 1947 and 1950. After retiring from competitions he worked as a sports administrator in Württemberg and was a youth trainer in the Skiing Association of Schwaben. In 1950 he became the first athlete to receive the Rudolf-Harbig-Gedächtnispreis, and in 1956 he was awarded the Golden Needle of the German Track and Field Association.
