= Kaarlo Tuominen =

Finnish runner

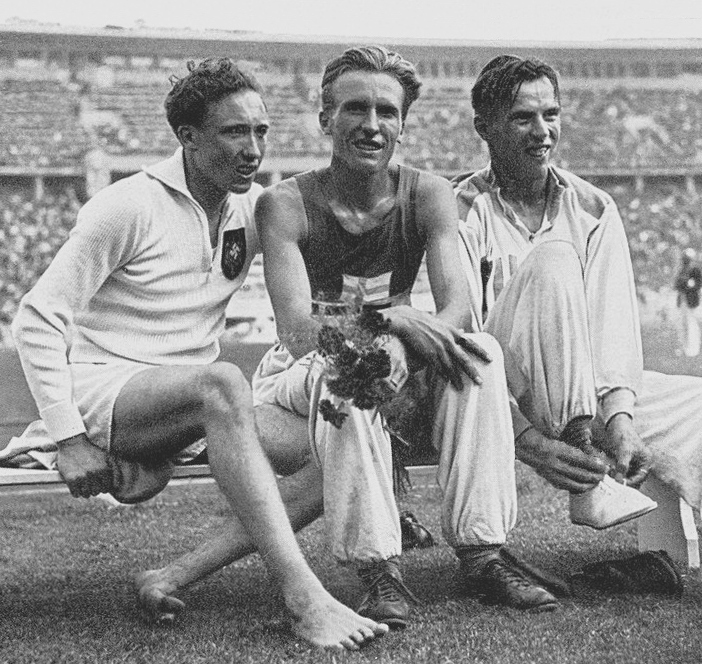
- Tuominen (right) at the 1936 Olympics

Personal information
- Full name: Kaarlo Jalmari Tuominen
- Born: 9 February 1908 Somerniemi, Finland
- Died: 20 October 2006 (aged 98) Lieto, Finland
- Height: 177 cm (5 ft 10 in)
- Weight: 66 kg (146 lb)

Sport
- Sport: Athletics
- Event(s): 1500 m, 5000 m, steeplechase,
- Club: Helsingin Poliisi-Voimailijat, Helsinki

Achievements and titles
- Personal best(s): 1500 m – 3:58.1 (1933); 5000 m – 15:09.2 (1930); 3000 mS – 9:06.8 (1936)
Medal record
Men's athletics
Representing Finland
Olympic Games
Silver medal – second place	1936 Berlin	3000 m steeplechase

Kaarlo Jalmari Tuominen (9 February 1908 – 20 October 2006) was a Finnish runner. He had his best achievements in the 3000 m steeplechase, winning a silver medal at the 1936 Olympics and placing fourth at the 1938 European Championships. He worked as a police officer in Helsinki.
