= Volmari Iso-Hollo =

Athletics competitor

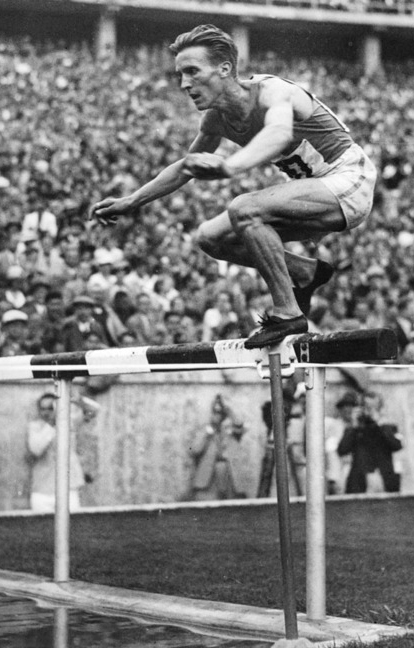
- Iso-Hollo running the steeplechase at the 1936 Summer Olympics.

Personal information
- Born: 5 January 1907 Ylöjärvi, Finland
- Died: 23 June 1969 (aged 62) Heinola, Finland
- Height: 1.76 m (5 ft 9 in)
- Weight: 64 kg (141 lb)

Sport
- Sport: Athletics
- Event: 1500-10000 m
- Club: HT, Helsinki; Keravan Urheilijat, Kerava

Achievements and titles
- Personal bests: 1500 m – 3:54.3 (1936); 3000 mS – 9:03.8 (1936); 5000 m – 14:18.4 (1932); 10000 m – 30:12.6 (1932)
Medal record
Representing Finland
Olympic Games
Gold medal – first place	1932 Los Angeles	3000 m steeplechase
Gold medal – first place	1936 Berlin	3000 m steeplechase
Silver medal – second place	1932 Los Angeles	10000 m
Bronze medal – third place	1936 Berlin	10000 m

Volmari "Vomma" Fritijof Iso-Hollo (5 January 1907 – 23 June 1969) was a Finnish runner. He competed at the 1932 and 1936 Olympics in the 3000 m steeplechase and 10000 m and won two gold, one silver and one bronze medals. Iso-Hollo was one of the last "Flying Finns", who dominated distance running between the World Wars.

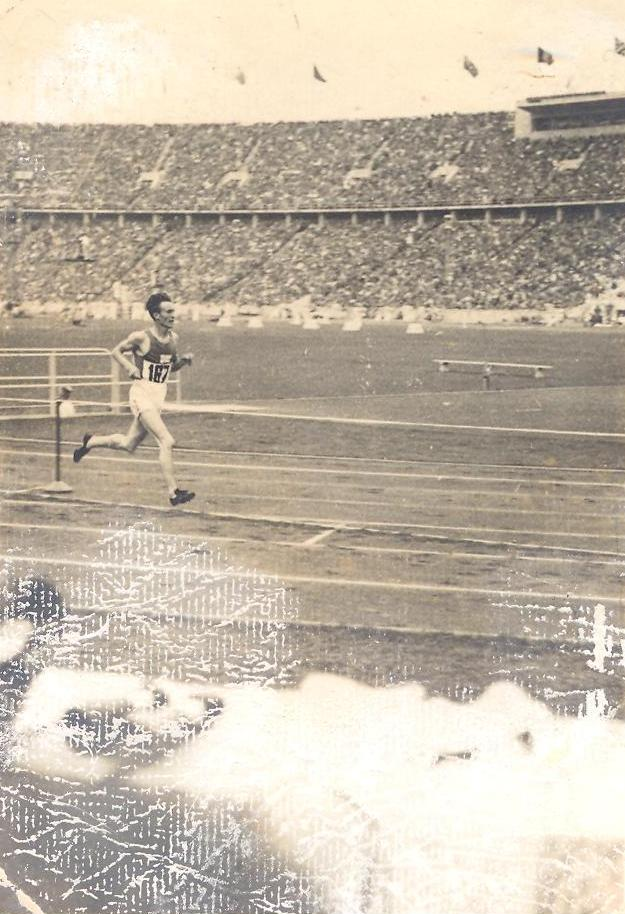
Volmari Iso-Hollo, 1936 Summer Olympics

As a youth, Iso-Hollo did skiing, gymnastics and boxing, and took up running when he joined the army. He was successful over distances between 400 m and marathon.

Iso-Hollo won his first Olympic gold medal in the 3000 m steeplechase at the 1932 Summer Olympics. He was denied a chance at the world record because the officials lost count of the number of laps – the lap-counter was looking the wrong way, being absorbed in the decathlon pole vault. When Iso-Hollo went to his last lap, the official failed to ring the bell, and the entire field kept on running, covering the distance of 3460 m. If the distance were 3000 m, Iso-Hollo probably would have broken the world record. He also won the silver in the 10,000 m.

In 1933, Iso-Hollo broke the 3000 m steeplechase world record, running 9.09.4 in Lahti and won the British AAA Championships title in the steeplechase event at the British 1933 AAA Championships.

He went to the 1936 Summer Olympics as a favourite. He won the steeplechase by three seconds, finishing with a new world record of 9:03.8, and earned a bronze medal over the 10,000 m. After the Olympics, Iso-Hollo fell ill with rheumatism but kept on competing until 1945. He died in 1969 aged 62.
