= Martti Matilainen =

Finnish runner (1907–1993)

Personal information
- Born: 18 September 1907 Iisalmi, Finland
- Died: 20 October 1993 (aged 86) Valkeakoski, Finland
- Height: 1.65 m (5 ft 5 in)
- Weight: 54 kg (119 lb)

Sport
- Sport: Running
- Club: Iisalmen Visa, Iisalmi

Achievements and titles
- Olympic finals: 1932, 1936

Martti Matilainen (18 September 1907 – 20 October 1993) was a Finnish runner who finished fourth in the 3000 m steeplechase at the 1932 and 1936 Olympics. In 1936 he also competed in the 1500 m, but failed to reach the final. His elder brothers Jukka and Kalle were also Olympic runners.
