= Joe McCluskey =

American steeplechaser and long distance runner (1911–2002)

Personal information
- Full name: Joseph Paul McCluskey
- Born: June 2, 1911 South Manchester, Connecticut, U.S.
- Died: August 31, 2002 (aged 91) Madison, Connecticut, U.S.
Medal record
Men's athletics
Representing the United States
Olympic Games
Bronze medal – third place	1932 Los Angeles	3000 m steeplechase

Joseph Paul McCluskey (June 2, 1911 – August 31, 2002) was an American track and field athlete. During his running career, he won 27 national titles in various distance events and captured the steeplechase title a record nine times in a 13-year period.

== Biography ==
At the 1932 Summer Olympics in Los Angeles, California, McCluskey won the bronze medal in the 3,000-meter steeplechase event. However, his medal could have been a silver. A substitute lap counter failed to hold up the number of the laps remaining the first time the runners went past, and the athletes wound up running an extra lap. McCluskey was second at what should have been the end of the regular race but dropped back to third during the extra lap. When offered the opportunity to rerun the race the next day, McCluskey said, "A race has only one finish line" and chose to let the results stand making it the only 3,460-meter steeplechase event ever held in Olympic history.

McCluskey, born in South Manchester, Connecticut, was also a 1936 Olympian and coached the New York Athletic Club for fourteen years. He graduated from Manchester High School in 1929. A 1933 graduate of Fordham University, McCluskey was inducted into the Fordham University Hall of Fame, the NYAC Hall of Fame, the USATF Hall of Fame in 1996 as well as the Penn Relays Wall of Fame posthumously in 2010.

He served as Lieutenant Commander in the United States Navy during World War II, then later married having eight children and employed as a stockbroker in New York City.

McCluskey died in Madison, Connecticut at the age of 91. He was survived by his wife Anne Conger, and his eight children.
