= 1993 World Championships in Athletics – Men's 3000 metres steeplechase =

These are the official results of the Men's 3.000 metres Steeplechase event at the 1993 IAAF World Championships in Stuttgart, Germany. There were a total number of 34 participating athletes, with three qualifying heats and the final held on Saturday 1993-08-21.

== Final ==
RANK	FINAL	TIME
	Moses Kiptanui (KEN)	8:06.36 CR
	Patrick Sang (KEN)	8:07.53
	Alessandro Lambruschini (ITA)	8:08.78
4.	Matthew Birir (KEN)	8:09.42
5.	Mark Croghan (USA)	8:09.76
6.	Steffen Brand (GER)	8:15.33
7.	Elarbi Khattabi (MAR)	8:17.96
8.	Angelo Carosi (ITA)	8:23.42
9.	Shaun Creighton (AUS)	8:23.45
10.	Michael Buchleitner (AUT)	8:25.88
11.	Marc Davis (USA)	8:28.74
12.	Ricardo Vera (URU)	8:29.00
13.	Abdelaziz Sahere (MAR)	8:29.65
14.	Martin Strege (GER)	8:34.31
15.	Tom Hanlon (GBR)	8:45.62
—	Azzedine Brahmi (ALG)	DNF

== Qualifying heats ==
- Held on Thursday 1993-08-19

RANK	HEAT 1	TIME
1.	Patrick Sang (KEN)	8:24.49
2.	Azzedine Brahmi (ALG)	8:24.73
3.	Abdelaziz Sahere (MAR)	8:24.89
4.	Michael Buchleitner (AUT)	8:24.92
5.	Shaun Creighton (AUS)	8:25.29
6.	Tom Buckner (GBR)	8:27.26
7.	Vladimir Pronin (RUS)	8:32.26
8.	Kim Bauermeister (GER)	8:37.41
9.	Wander Moura (BRA)	8:46.03
10.	Brian Diemer (USA)	9:01.88
11.	Prakash Davendra Singh (FIJ)	9:21.15
—	Antonio Peula (ESP)	DNS

RANK	HEAT 2	TIME
1.	Matthew Birir (KEN)	8:23.11
2.	Steffen Brand (GER)	8:23.27
3.	Elarbi Khattabi (MAR)	8:23.57
4.	Alessandro Lambruschini (ITA)	8:25.46
5.	Marc Davis (USA)	8:26.49
6.	Colin Walker (GBR)	8:36.22
7.	Tura Bezunen (ETH)	8:37.13
8.	Thierry Brusseau (FRA)	8:39.82
9.	Akira Nakamura (JPN)	8:48.89
10.	Eduardo Henriques (POR)	8:57.21
—	Gustavo Castillo (MEX)	DNF

RANK	HEAT 3	TIME
1.	Moses Kiptanui (KEN)	8:19.08
2.	Mark Croghan (USA)	8:19.14
3.	Angelo Carosi (ITA)	8:19.66
4.	Martin Strege (GER)	8:21.24
5.	Tom Hanlon (GBR)	8:23.16
6.	Ricardo Vera (URU)	8:23.65
7.	João Junqueira (POR)	8:28.39
8.	Jim Svenøy (NOR)	8:29.34
9.	Ville Hautala (FIN)	8:32.49
10.	Saad Shaddad Al-Asmari (KSA)	8:35.06
11.	Whaddon Niewoudt (RSA)	8:36.40

== See also ==
- 1990 Men's European Championships 3.000m Steeplechase (Split)
- 1991 Men's World Championships 3.000m Steeplechase (Tokyo)
- 1992 Men's Olympic 3.000m Steeplechase (Barcelona)
- 1994 Men's European Championships 3.000m Steeplechase (Helsinki)
- 1995 Men's World Championships 3.000m Steeplechase (Gothenburg)
