= Athletics at the 1992 Summer Olympics – Men's 3000 metres steeplechase =

Men's 3000 metres steeplechase at the Games of the XXV Olympiad
- Venue: Estadi Olímpic de Montjuïc
- Dates: 3 August 1992 (heats); 5 August 1992 (semi-finals); 7 August 1992 (final)
- Competitors: 32 from 24 nations
- Winning time: 8:08.84

Medalists
1st place, gold medalist(s)		Matthew Birir; Kenya
2nd place, silver medalist(s)		Patrick Sang; Kenya
3rd place, bronze medalist(s)		William Mutwol; Kenya

These are the official results of the men's 3000 metres steeplechase event at the 1992 Summer Olympics in Barcelona, Spain. There were a total number of 33 participating athletes, with four qualifying heats.

At the gun, it seemed like the rest of the world came to run, while the Kenyan team were just tagging along. Starting off slowly, all three Kenyans casually jogged around the outside of the pack and towards the front. William Mutwol continued, breaking away to as much as a 10-metre lead, with Elarbi Khattabi the only one to bridge the gap. On the next lap, Matthew Birir, running in fourth place, went down on the track, but Birir righted himself quickly and was back on his feet before the back of the strung out field had passed him. Within two more barriers, he was back in the same fourth-place position. By the time they reached the same spot on the track where Birir fell, he was in third place as the tail of the three man Kenyan breakaway. Over the next two laps, the only athlete seriously marking the Kenyans was Alessandro Lambruschini. Just after two laps to go, Patrick Sang edged ahead of Mutwol with Lambruschini gaining a little ground between barriers and losing the same amount each time he went over one. With a lap to go, Birir moved into the lead and the Kenyan sweep simply pulled away from Lambruschini, with the rest of the field already disappeared behind. No drama, no hurdling the water jump, no challenges, not even any sprinting. Lambruschini finished fourth for the second Olympics in a row, more than 25 metres behind Mutwol. This became the first Olympic podium sweep by an African nation.

== Medalists ==
Gold	Matthew Birir; Kenya
Silver	Patrick Sang; Kenya
Bronze	William Mutwol; Kenya

== Records ==
These were the standing world and Olympic records (in minutes) prior to the 1992 Summer Olympics.

World record	8:05.35	(Kenya) Peter Koech	Stockholm (SWE)	July 3, 1989
Olympic record	8:05.51	(Kenya) Julius Kariuki	Seoul (KOR)	September 30, 1988

== Final ==
- Held on August 7, 1992

RANK	FINAL	TIME
	Matthew Birir (KEN)	8:08.84
	Patrick Sang (KEN)	8:09.55
	William Mutwol (KEN)	8:10.74
4.	Alessandro Lambruschini (ITA)	8:15.52
5.	Steffen Brand (GER)	8:16.60
6.	Tom Hanlon (GBR)	8:18.14
7.	Brian Diemer (USA)	8:18.77
8.	Azzedine Brahmi (ALG)	8:20.71
9.	William Van Dijck (BEL)	8:22.51
10.	Elarbi Khattabi (MAR)	8:23.82
11.	Clodoaldo Lopes do Carmo (BRA)	8:25.92
12.	Ricardo Vera (URU)	8:26.35

== Semifinals ==
RANK	HEAT 1	TIME
1.	Matthew Birir (KEN)	8:25.55
2.	Steffen Brand (GER)	8:26.12
3.	Patrick Sang (KEN)	8:26.46
4.	William Van Dijck (BEL)	8:26.70
5.	Tom Hanlon (GBR)	8:26.91
6.	Ricardo Vera (URU)	8:27.46
7.	Mark Croghan (USA)	8:30.15
8.	Tom Buckner (GBR)	8:32.89
9.	Ville Hautala (FIN)	8:33.69
10.	João Junqueira (POR)	8:39.17
11.	Daniel Lopez (USA)	8:41.28
12.	Joseph Mahmoud (FRA)	8:52.00

RANK	HEAT 2	TIME
1.	William Mutwol (KEN)	8:19.83
2.	Clodoaldo Lopes do Carmo (BRA)	8:20.46
3.	Brian Diemer (USA)	8:23.30
4.	Alessandro Lambruschini (ITA)	8:23.56
5.	Azzedine Brahmi (ALG)	8:25.85
6.	Elarbi Khattabi (MAR)	8:27.00
7.	Vladimir Golias (EUN)	8:30.26
8.	Colin Walker (GBR)	8:34.82
9.	Mohammed Al-Dossary (KSA)	8:36.38
10.	Whaddon Niewoudt (RSA)	8:37.99
11.	Hagen Melzer (GER)	8:38.07
12.	Thierry Brusseau (FRA)	8:42.48

== Heats ==
RANK	HEAT 1	TIME
1.	William Mutwol (KEN)	8:26.23
2.	Brian Diemer (USA)	8:28.88
3.	Colin Walker (GBR)	8:29.34
4.	Steffen Brand (GER)	8:30.03
5.	Vladimir Golyas (EUN)	8:32.49
6.	Thierry Brusseau (FRA)	8:33.10
7.	Ville Hautala (FIN)	8:34.10
8.	Michael Buchleitner (AUT)	8:40.46
9.	Graeme Fell (CAN)	8:50.87
10.	Prakash Davendra Singh (FIJ)	9:07.49
—	Abdelaziz Sahere (MAR)	DNS

RANK	HEAT 2	TIME
1.	Matthew Birir (KEN)	8:23.22
2.	Clodoaldo Lopes do Carmo (BRA)	8:26.31
3.	William Van Dijck (BEL)	8:27.23
4.	Azzeddine Brahmi (ALG)	8:28.01
5.	Tom Buckner (GBR)	8:28.36
6.	Elarbi Khattabi (MAR)	8:28.50
7.	Daniel Lopez (USA)	8:29.01
8.	Hagen Melzer (GER)	8:31.89
9.	Mohammed Al-Dossary (KSA)	8:36.73
10.	Ivan Konovalov (EUN)	8:58.04
11.	Hector Begeo (PHI)	9:14.48

RANK	HEAT 3	TIME
1.	Patrick Sang (KEN)	8:27.01
2.	Tom Hanlon (GBR)	8:27.46
3.	Ricardo Vera (URU)	8:27.71
4.	Mark Croghan (USA)	8:28.15
5.	Alessandro Lambruschini (ITA)	8:29.64
6.	Joseph Mahmoud (FRA)	8:30.54
7.	Whaddon Niewoudt (RSA)	8:30.61
8.	João Junqueira (POR)	8:32.68
9.	Hamid Sajjadi (IRI)	8:36.87
10.	Marcelo Cascabelo (ARG)	8:38.89
11.	Jamal Abdi Hassan (QAT)	8:54.98

== Final ranking ==
Rank	Name	Nation
1st place, gold medalist(s)	Matthew Birir	Kenya
2nd place, silver medalist(s)	Patrick Sang	Kenya
3rd place, bronze medalist(s)	William Mutwol	Kenya
4	Alessandro Lambruschini	Italy
5	Steffen Brand	Germany
6	Tom Hanlon	Great Britain
7	Brian Diemer	United States
8	Azzedine Brahmi	Algeria
9	William Van Dijck	Belgium
10	Elarbi Khattabi	Morocco
11	Clodoaldo do Carmo	Brazil
12	Ricardo Vera	Uruguay
13	Mark Croghan	United States
14	Vladimir Golyas	Unified Team
15	Tom Buckner	Great Britain
16	Ville Hautala	Finland

Rank	Name	Nation
17	Colin Walker	Great Britain
18	Mohammed Al-Dossary	Saudi Arabia
19	Whaddon Niewoudt	South Africa
20	Hagen Melzer	Germany
21	João Junqueira	Portugal
22	Daniel Lopez	United States
23	Thierry Brusseau	France
24	Joseph Mahmoud	France
25	Hamid Sajjadi	Iran
26	Marcelo Cascabelo	Argentina
27	Michael Buchleitner	Austria
28	Graeme Fell	Canada
29	Jamal Abdi Hassan	Qatar
30	Ivan Konovalov	Unified Team
31	Davendra Singh	Fiji
32	Hector Begeo	Philippines

== See also ==
- 1990 Men's European Championships 3,000 m Steeplechase (Split)
- 1991 Men's World Championships 3,000 m Steeplechase (Tokyo)
- 1993 Men's World Championships 3,000 m Steeplechase (Stuttgart)
- 1994 Men's European Championships 3,000 m Steeplechase (Helsinki)
- 1995 Men's World Championships 3,000 m Steeplechase (Gothenburg)
