= 1991 World Championships in Athletics – Men's 3000 metres steeplechase =

Video on YouTube Official Video

These are the official results of the Men's 3.000 metres Steeplechase event at the 1991 IAAF World Championships in Tokyo, Japan. There were a total number of 37 participating athletes, with three qualifying heats and the final held on Saturday August 31, 1991.

== Summary ==
Defending champion Francesco Panetta took the early lead, shadowed by Tom Hanlon. The ever dangerous Kenyan team scattered toward the rear of the pack, but quickly moved forward as a group to join the train behind Hanlon. The first action happened on the third lap when Hagen Melzer and Graeme Fell found themselves lying on the track after Fell fell over a barrier. Later in the lap, the Kenyans tired of training Hanlon and moved directly behind Panetta. Finally, the fourth time over the water jump, the entire Kenyan team passed Panetta. Over the next lap, Panetta began to fall back, leaving a 5-man break on the front, with Abdelaziz Sahere and Azzedine Brahmi tagging on behind the Kenyans. Behind the group, Panetta, Brian Diemer and Angelo Carosi were chasing trying to bridge the gap. Of the Kenyans, the order was consistently World 1500m Junior Champion Moses Kiptanui leading Patrick Sang, with Olympic champion Julius Kariuki. On the penultimate lap, the Kenyans appeared to slow, enough for the breakaway group to catch the back temporarily, before the Kenyans again accelerated away. During the acceleration, Kariuki upset the patter by moving up to Kiptanui's shoulder. By the bell, only Brahmi was able to hold on to the back of Sang, the trailing Kenyan, as Kariuki spent the next half lap challenging Kiptanui for the lead. Down the backstretch, Brahmi passed Sang before the water jump, but after the water it was again the three Kenyans on the front. As they hit the final straight, Kiptanui held a 2-metre lead over Sang, while Kariuki took the turn wide enough to allow Brahmi to fall in behind Sang, with Kariuki effectively conceding a Kenyan sweep and the bronze medal to him with 80 metres to go. Down the stretch, Sang accelerated enough for Kiptanui to sense his presence, then Kiptanui sped up to take a decisive victory.

== Medalists ==
Gold	Moses Kiptanui; Kenya (KEN)
Silver	Patrick Sang; Kenya (KEN)
Bronze	Azzedine Brahmi; Algeria (ALG)

== Schedule ==
- All times are Japan Standard Time (UTC+9)

Heats
29.08.1991 – 19:20h
Final
31.08.1991 – 19:20h

== Qualifying heats ==
- Held on Thursday 1991-08-29

RANK	HEAT 1	TIME
1.	Tom Hanlon (GBR)	8:18.02
2.	Julius Kariuki (KEN)	8:18.06
3.	Graeme Fell (CAN)	8:18.19
4.	Abdelaziz Sahere (MAR)	8:18.23
5.	Brian Diemer (USA)	8:18.29
6.	Thierry Brusseau (FRA)	8:27.77
7.	Shaun Creighton (AUS)	8:30.65
8.	Akira Nakamura (JPN)	8:33.89
9.	José Carlos Pereira (POR)	8:39.30
10.	Jiří Švec (TCH)	8:41.08
11.	Juan Azkueta (ESP)	8:50.50
—	Alessandro Lambruschini (ITA)	DNS

RANK	HEAT 2	TIME
1.	Patrick Sang (KEN)	8:26.78
2.	Francesco Panetta (ITA)	8:27.25
3.	Gábor Markó (HUN)	8:27.53
4.	Joseph Mahmoud (FRA)	8:28.35
5.	Mark Croghan (USA)	8:29.20
6.	Ricardo Vera (URU)	8:30.14
7.	Benito Nogales (ESP)	8:39.21
8.	Marcelo Cascabelo (ARG)	8:44.57
9.	Jorgen Salo (FIN)	8:45.68
10.	Peter McColgan (GBR)	8:58.34
11.	Deena Ram (IND)	9:05.21
—	Ivan Konovalov (URS)	DNF

RANK	HEAT 3	TIME
1.	Moses Kiptanui (KEN)	8:27.52
2.	Azzedine Brahmi (ALG)	8:27.95
3.	Angelo Carosi (ITA)	8:28.35
4.	William Van Dijck (BEL)	8:28.44
5.	Hagen Melzer (GER)	8:28.56
6.	Colin Walker (GBR)	8:30.69
7.	Bruno Le Stum (FRA)	8:33.38
8.	Dan Nelson (USA)	8:40.23
9.	João Junqueira (POR)	8:43.37
10.	Antonio Peula (ESP)	8:45.41
11.	Mohammed al-Dosari (KSA)	8:50.29
12.	Prakash Davendra Singh (FIJ)	9:23.28
—	Adauto Domingues (BRA)	DNS

== Final ==
RANK	FINAL	TIME
	Moses Kiptanui (KEN)	8:12.59
	Patrick Sang (KEN)	8:13.44
	Azzedine Brahmi (ALG)	8:15.54
4.	Julius Kariuki (KEN)	8:16.81
5.	Brian Diemer (USA)	8:17.76
6.	Abdelaziz Sahere (MAR)	8:19.40
7.	Angelo Carosi (ITA)	8:20.80
8.	Francesco Panetta (ITA)	8:26.79
9.	William Van Dijck (BEL)	8:30.46
10.	Joseph Mahmoud (FRA)	8:37.09
11.	Tom Hanlon (GBR)	8:41.14
12.	Hagen Melzer (GER)	8:45.58
13.	Thierry Brusseau (FRA)	8:47.46
14.	Graeme Fell (CAN)	9:01.73
15.	Gábor Markó (HUN)	9:11.53

== See also ==
- 1987 Men's World Championships 3.000m Steeplechase (Rome)
- 1988 Men's Olympic 3.000m Steeplechase (Seoul)
- 1990 Men's European Championships 3.000m Steeplechase (Split)
- 1992 Men's Olympic 3.000m Steeplechase (Barcelona)
- 1993 Men's World Championships 3.000m Steeplechase (Stuttgart)
