= National records in the 3000 metres steeplechase =

The following table is an overview of national records in the 3000 metres steeplechase.

== Men ==
Country	Time	Athlete	Date	Place	Ref.
Ethiopia	7:52.11	Lamecha Girma	9 June 2023	Paris	
Qatar	7:53.63	Saif Saaeed Shaheen	3 September 2004	Brussels	
Kenya	7:53.64	Brimin Kipruto	22 July 2011	Monaco	
Morocco	7:55.28	Brahim Boulami	24 August 2001	Brussels	
Germany	7:57.80	Frederik Ruppert	31 May 2026	Rabat	
France	8:00.09	Mahiedine Mekhissi-Benabbad	6 July 2013	Saint-Denis	
United States	8:00.45	Evan Jager	4 July 2015	Saint-Denis	
Japan	8:03.43	Ryuji Miura	11 July 2025	Fontvieille	
Uganda	8:03.81	Benjamin Kiplagat	8 July 2010	Lausanne	
Netherlands	8:04.95	Simon Vroemen	26 August 2005	Brussels	
Luxembourg	8:05.36	Ruben Querinjean	23 August 2026	Chorzów	
Spain	8:05.69	Fernando Carro	12 July 2019	Monaco	
Sweden	8:05.75	Mustafa Mohamed	28 July 2007	Heusden	
Bahrain	8:06.13	Tareq Mubarak Taher	13 July 2009	Athens	
Tunisia	8:07.73	Mohamed Amin Jhinaoui	7 August 2024	Saint-Denis	
Great Britain	8:07.96	Mark Rowland	30 September 1988	Seoul	
Saudi Arabia	8:08.14	Saad Shaddad Al-Asmari	16 July 2002	Stockholm	
Italy	8:08.57	Francesco Panetta	5 September 1989	Rome	
Poland	8:09.11	Bronisław Malinowski	28 July 1976	Montreal	
Belgium	8:09.47	Ruben Querinjean (Note: Ratified as Belgian record, even though he started for Luxembourg.)	22 August 2025	Brussels	
New Zealand	8:09.64	Geordie Beamish	7 July 2024	Paris	
India	8:09.91	Avinash Sable	7 July 2024	Paris	
Algeria	8:10.23	Laid Bessou	18 August 2000	Monaco	
China	8:10.46	Sun Ripeng	19 October 1997	Shanghai	
Finland	8:10.67	Jukka Keskisalo	28 August 2009	Zürich	
Austria	8:10.83	Günther Weidlinger	21 August 1999	Seville	
Eritrea	8:11.22	Yemane Haileselassie	8 June 2017	Rome	
South Africa	8:11.50	Ruben Ramolefi	29 August 2011	Deagu	
Canada	8:11.64	Matthew Hughes	15 August 2013	Moscow	
Norway	8:12.05	Jim Svenøy	22 August 1997	Brussels	
Tanzania	8:12.48	Filbert Bayi	31 July 1980	Moscow	
Portugal	8:12.19	Etson Barros	9 August 2025	Oordegem	
Romania	8:13.26	Florin Ionescu	21 August 1999	Seville	
Brazil	8:14.41	Wander Moura	22 March 1995	Mar del Plata	
Russia	8:15.54	Pavel Potapovich	4 July 2003	Saint-Denis	
Australia	8:16.22	Shaun Creighton	2 July 1993	Villeneuve d'Ascq	
Slovenia	8:16.96	Boštjan Buč	12 June 2003	Ostrava	
Turkey	8:17.85	Tarık Langat Akdağ	3 August 2012	London	
Hungary	8:17.97	Gábor Markó	21 July 1984	Potsdam	
Moldova	8:18.97	Ion Luchianov	16 August 2008	Beijing	
Denmark	8:20.42	Ole Hesselbjerg	8 June 2021	Turku	
Venezuela	8:20.87	José Peña	1 September 2013	Berlin	
Bulgaria	8:20.87	Mitko Tsenov	12 June 2014	Huelva	
Egypt	8:21.55	Salem Mohamed Attiaallah	28 June 2024	Luxembourg	
Ukraine	8:21.75	Andriy Popelyayev	19 July 1984	Moscow	
Andorra	8:21.76	Nahuel Carabaña	10 September 2023	Zagreb	
Czech Republic	8:21.83	Tomáš Habarta	10 June 2024	Rome	
Djibouti	8:22.17	Mohamed Ismail Ibrahim	12 June 2021	Nice	
Lithuania	8:22.2h	Vladimiras Dudinas	19 August 1969	Kyiv	
Switzerland	8:22.24	Christian Belz	4 June 2001	Hengelo	
Puerto Rico	8:22.31	Victor Ortiz Rivera	12 July 2025	Los Angeles	
Iran	8:22.79	Hosein Keyhani	27 August 2018	Jakarta	
Uruguay	8:23.02	Ricardo Vera	28 June 1992	Hengelo	
Cyprus	8:24.01	Filippos Filippou	15 September 1983	Casablanca	
Greece	8:24.01	Filippos Filippou	15 September 1983	Casablanca	
Ireland	8:24.09	Brendan Quinn	30 August 1985	Brussels	
Kazakhstan	8:24.13	Artyom Kosinov	11 June 2012	Moscow	
Israel	8:24.14	Itai Maggidi	4 July 2008	Longeville-lès-Metz	
Belarus	8:25.2h	Aleksandr Vorobey	6 July 1980	Moscow	
Zambia	8:25.49	Godfrey Siamusiye	16 July 1995	Birmingham	
Argentina	8:25.63	Marcelo Cascabelo	4 June 1989	Belgrade	
Colombia	8:25.66	Carlos San Martín	29 June 2021	Castellón	
Mexico	8:25.69	Salvador Miranda	8 July 2000	Barakaldo	
Cuba	8:26.16	José Sanchez	19 June 2009	Havana	
Uzbekistan	8:27.51; 8:19.75 (Note: Not accepted as a national record by the Uzbekistani athletic federation.)	Anatoliy Dimov	19 June 1983; 31 July 1980	Moscow; Moscow	
Armenia	8:27.88	Artashes Mikoyan	29 May 1976	Munich	
Georgia	8:28.0h	Sergey Skripka	11 June 1977	Moscow	
Estonia	8:28.55	Kaur Kivistik	3 September 2019	Zagreb	
Peru	8:28.67	Mario Bazán	16 August 2009	Berlin	
Serbia	8:28.80	Vule Maksimović	4 September 1989	Budapest	
Chile	8:28.99	Emilio Ulloa	8 August 1984	Los Angeles	
Panama	8:31.89	Didier Rodriguez	25 September 2026	Santa Fe	

== Women ==
Country	Time	Athlete	Date	Place	Ref.
Kenya	8:44.32	Beatrice Chepkoech	20 July 2018	Monaco	
Bahrain	8:44.39	Winfred Yavi	30 August 2024	Rome	
Uganda	8:48.03	Peruth Chemutai	30 August 2024	Roma	
Kazakhstan	8:53.02	Norah Jeruto	20 July 2022	Eugene	
Ethiopia	8:54.61	Werkwuha Getachew	20 July 2022	Eugene	
United States	8:57.77	Courtney Frerichs	21 August 2021	Eugene	
Tunisia	8:58.09	Marwa Bouzayani	16 May 2026	Shaoxing/Keqiao	
France	8:58.67	Alice Finot	6 August 2024	Saint-Denis	
Russia	8:58.81	Gulnara Galkina	17 August 2008	Beijing	
Germany	9:03.30	Gesa-Felicitas Krause	28 September 2019	Doha	
Great Britain	9:04.35	Elizabeth Bird	6 August 2024	Saint-Denis	
Slovenia	9:06.37	Maruša Mišmaš-Zrimsek	27 August 2023	Budapest	
India	9:08.67	Parul Chaudhary	27 September 2026	Gumi	
Spain	9:09.39	Marta Domínguez	25 July 2009	Barcelona	
Albania	9:09.64	Luiza Gega	31 August 2023	Zürich	
Norway	9:13.35	Karoline Bjerkeli Grøvdal	26 August 2017	Sandnes	
Denmark	9:13.46	Anna Emilie Møller	30 September 2019	Doha	
Turkey	9:13.53	Gülcan Mıngır	9 June 2012	Sofia	
Jamaica	9:14.09	Aisha Praught-Leer	31 August 2018	Brussels	
Australia	9:14.28	Genevieve LaCaze	27 August 2016	Saint-Denis	
Belarus	9:16.51	Alesya Turova	27 July 2002	Gdańsk	
Poland	9:16.51	Alicja Konieczek	4 August 2024	Saint-Denis	
Romania	9:16.85	Cristina Casandra	17 August 2008	Beijing	
Portugal	9:18.54	Jessica Augusto	9 June 2010	Huelva	
Israel	9:19.90	Adva Cohen	15 September 2025	Tokyo	
Switzerland	9:20.28	Chiara Scherrer	18 June 2022	Paris	
China	9:20.32	Zhang Xinyan	8 April 2021	Shaoxing	
Canada	9:20.58	Ceili McCabe	17 May 2024	Los Angeles	
Morocco	9:20.64	Salima El Ouali Alami	17 July 2015	Monaco	
Finland	9:21.02	Ilona Mononen	15 September 2025	Tokyo	
Sweden	9:23.96	Charlotta Fougberg	12 July 2014	Glasgow	
Brazil	9:24.38	Tatiane Raquel da Silva	11 June 2022	Watford	
Ukraine	9:24.54	Nataliya Strebkova	30 June 2022	Stockholm	
Japan	9:24.72	Miu Saito	15 September 2025	Tokyo	
Netherlands	9:25.53	Veerle Bakker	9 August 2025	Oordegem	
Algeria	9:25.90	Amina Betiche	17 May 2017	Baku	
Argentina	9:25.99	Belén Casetta	11 August 2017	London	
Hungary	9:26.59	Zita Kácser	31 August 2019	Budapest	
Lithuania	9:26.88	Greta Karinauskaitė	27 May 2023	Sacramento	
Latvia	9:27.21	Poļina Jeļizarova	4 August 2012	London	
Italy	9:27.48	Elena Romagnolo	15 August 2008	Beijing	
Ireland	9:28.29	Roisin McGettigan	28 July 2007	Heusden-Zolder	
Belgium	9:28.47	Veerle Dejaeghere	2 June 2007	Neerpelt	
Cuba	9:50.88	Anisleidis Ochoa	7 August 2026	Santo Domingo	
Slovakia	9:57.11	Anna Švrček	27 September 2025	Shizuoka	
Egypt	10:04.52	Malak Abdelghany Abdalla Ibrahim	7 August 2026	Eugene	
Georgia	10:13.69	Valeriya Zhandarova	24 July 2019	Joensuu	
Luxembourg	10:40.83	Maxine Libens-Thein	29 March 2026	Vancouver	
Kosovo	10:42.39	Gresa Bakraçi	22 June 2023	Chorzów	
Costa Rica	10:42.88	Maria Nellys Chaves	7 August 2026	Santo Domingo	
Guatemala	10:51.10	Débora Eunice Quel	7 August 2026	Santo Domingo	
Singapore	11:04.18	Vanessa Lee Ying Zhuang	10 May 2025	Hong Kong	
Lebanon	11:42.87	Sama Mostafa	21 June 2026	Ismailia	
