= Tom Hanlon (athlete) =

Scottish athlete

Personal information
- Nationality: British (Scottish)
- Born: 20 May 1967 (age 59) Iserlohn, Germany

Sport
- Club: Caledonian Park Harriers

Tom Hanlon (born 20 May 1967) is a Scottish former athlete who competed mainly in the 3000 metres steeplechase. He represented Great Britain at the 1992 Barcelona Olympics. He also represented Great Britain at two World Championships, and Scotland at two Commonwealth Games. His best time for the 3000m steeplechase of 8:12.58 on 3 August 1991 in Monaco, is the Scottish record (as of 2016) and ranks him third on the British all-time list behind Mark Rowland and Colin Reitz.

== Biography ==
Hanlon was born in West Germany and his father was a royal signals warrant officer. Hanlon raced for Caledonian Park Harriers, which was the name given to the Edinburgh AC for sponsorship reasons. He finished fourth in the 2000m steeplechase at both the 1985 European Junior Championships, and the 1986 World Junior Championships. After finishing a disappointing 12th at the 1990 Commonwealth Games in January, he went on to finish sixth at the 1990 European Championships in August. He ran 8:18.14 to finish sixth in the 3000m steeplechase final at the 1992 Barcelona Olympics. He also reached the World Championship finals in 1991 and 1993.

Hanlon, who also worked in advertising and sports magazines in the 1980s, is a four-time Scottish champion at 1500m (1987–90). He also finished second at the AAA Championships in the 3000 m steeplechase (1990) and the 1500m (1992).

== International competitions ==
Year	Competition	Venue	Position	Event	Notes
Representing Great Britain / Scotland
1985	World Cross Country Championships	Lisbon, Portugal	47th	8.2 km (junior race)	24:10
1985	European Junior Championships	Cottbus, East Germany	4th	2000 m steeplechase	5:39.43
1986	World Cross Country Championships	Neuchâtel, Switzerland	134th	7.75 km (junior race)	25:57
1986	World Junior Championships	Athens, Greece	4th	2000 m steeplechase	5:32.84
1986	Commonwealth Games	Edinburgh, Scotland	10th	3000 m steeplechase	8:53.56
1989	World Cup	Barcelona, Spain	5th	3000 m steeplechase	8:28.34
1990	Commonwealth Games	Auckland, New Zealand	12th	3000 m steeplechase	8:45.76
1990	European Championships	Split, Yugoslavia	6th	3000 m steeplechase	8:21.73
1991	World Championships	Tokyo, Japan	11th	3000 m steeplechase	8:41.14
1992	Olympic Games	Barcelona, Spain	6th	3000 m steeplechase	8:18.14
1993	World Championships	Stuttgart, Germany	15th	3000 m steeplechase	8:45.62
1994	European Championships	Helsinki, Finland	10th	3000 m steeplechase	8:36.06
