= Kenya at the 1992 Summer Olympics =

- IOC code: KEN
- NOC: National Olympic Committee of Kenya
- Website: teamkenya.or.ke

in Barcelona
- Competitors: 49 (40 men and 9 women) in 5 sports
- Flag bearer: Patrick Sang
- Medals Ranked 21st: Gold 2 Silver 4 Bronze 2 Total 8

Summer Olympics appearances (overview)
- 1956; 1960; 1964; 1968; 1972; 1976–1980; 1984; 1988; 1992; 1996; 2000; 2004; 2008; 2012; 2016; 2020; 2024

Kenya competed at the 1992 Summer Olympics in Barcelona, Spain.

== Medalists ==
Medal	Name	Sport	Event	Date
Gold	William Tanui	Athletics	Men's 800 m	5 August
Gold	Matthew Birir	Athletics	Men's 3000 m steeplechase	7 August
Silver	Richard Chelimo	Athletics	Men's 10,000 m	3 August
Silver	Nixon Kiprotich	Athletics	Men's 800 m	5 August
Silver	Patrick Sang	Athletics	Men's 3000 m steeplechase	7 August
Silver	Paul Bitok	Athletics	Men's 5000 m	8 August
Bronze	Samson Kitur	Athletics	Men's 400 m	5 August
Bronze	William Mutwol	Athletics	Men's 3000 m steeplechase	7 August

== Competitors ==
The following is the list of number of competitors in the Games.

Sport	Men	Women	Total
Athletics	29	9	38
Boxing	5	–	5
Judo	3	0	3
Shooting	2	0	2
Weightlifting	1	–	1
Total	40	9	49

== Athletics ==
Men
Track and road events

Athlete	Event	Heats		Quarterfinal		Semifinal		Final	
Athlete	Event	Result	Rank	Result	Rank	Result	Rank	Result	Rank
Kennedy Ondiek	100 metres	10.60	35	Did not advance					
Simeon Kipkemboi	200 metres	21.57	46	Did not advance					
Kennedy Ondiek	200 metres	21.04	22 Q	20.86	24	Did not advance			
Simon Kemboi	400 metres	45.84	14 Q	45.40	14 Q	45.93	14	Did not advance	
David Kitur	400 metres	46.22	28 Q	46.15	23	Did not advance			
Samson Kitur	400 metres	45.41	7 Q	44.66	2 Q	44.18	2 Q	44.24	3rd place, bronze medalist(s)
Paul Ereng	800 metres	1:46.65	7 q	—N/a		1:49.90	21	Did not advance	
Nixon Kiprotich	800 metres	1:47.45	16 Q	—N/a		1:46.02	5 q	1:43.70	2nd place, silver medalist(s)
William Tanui	800 metres	1:47.02	12 Q	—N/a		1:46.59	7 Q	1:43.66	1st place, gold medalist(s)
Jonah Birir	1500 metres	3:38.29	12 Q	—N/a		3:35.41	3 Q	3:41.27	5
Joseph Chesire	1500 metres	3:44.06	20 Q	—N/a		3:39.43	10 Q	3:41.12	4
David Kibet	1500 metres	3:36.32	1 Q	—N/a		3:35.82	5 Q	3:42.62	10
Paul Bitok	5000 metres	13:36.81	14 Q	—N/a				13:12.71	2nd place, silver medalist(s)
Dominic Kirui	5000 metres	13:24.21	4 q	—N/a				13:45.16	14
Yobes Ondieki	5000 metres	13:31.88	9 q	—N/a				13:17.50	5
Richard Chelimo	10,000 metres	28:16.39	5 Q	—N/a				27:47.72	2nd place, silver medalist(s)
William Koech	10,000 metres	28:06.86	1 Q	—N/a				28:25.18	7
Moses Tanui	10,000 metres	28:24.07	12 Q	—N/a				28:27.11	8
Ibrahim Hussein	Marathon	—N/a						2:19:49	37
Boniface Merande	Marathon	—N/a						2:15:46	14
Douglas Wakiihuri	Marathon	—N/a						2:19:38	36
Erick Keter	400 metres hurdles	48.28	1 Q	—N/a		49.01	10	Did not advance	
Barnabas Kinyor	400 metres hurdles	48.90	7 q	—N/a		49.52	12	Did not advance	
Gideon Yego	400 metres hurdles	49.23	20	—N/a		Did not advance			
Matthew Birir	3000 metres steeplechase	8:23.22	1 Q	—N/a		8:25.55	5 Q	8:08.84	1st place, gold medalist(s)
William Mutwol	3000 metres steeplechase	8:26.23	2 Q	—N/a		8:19.83	1 Q	8:10.74	3rd place, bronze medalist(s)
Patrick Sang	3000 metres steeplechase	8:27.01	4 Q	—N/a		8:26.46	8 Q	8:09.55	2nd place, silver medalist(s)
Samson Kitur; Abednego Matilu; Simeon Kipkemboi; Simon Kemboi; David Kitur (heats)	4 × 400 metres relay	2:59.63	3 q	—N/a				DNF	

Field events

Athlete	Event	Qualification		Final	
Athlete	Event	Distance	Position	Distance	Position
Benjamin Koech	Long jump	7.44	36	Did not advance	
James Sabulei	Long jump	7.50	33	Did not advance	

Women
Track and road events

Athlete	Event	Heats		Quarterfinal		Semifinal		Final	
Athlete	Event	Result	Rank	Result	Rank	Result	Rank	Result	Rank
Gladys Wamuyu	800 metres	2:03.01	26	—N/a		Did not advance			
Susan Sirma	1500 metres	4:17.73	27	—N/a		Did not advance			
Esther Kiplagat	3000 metres	8:44.97	13	—N/a				Did not advance	
Pauline Konga	3000 metres	9:02.79	24	—N/a				Did not advance	
Jane Ngotho	3000 metres	9:00.96	23	—N/a				Did not advance	
Lydia Cheromei	10,000 metres	33:34.05	30	—N/a				Did not advance	
Hellen Kimaiyo	10,000 metres	31:58.63	2 Q	—N/a				31:38.91	9
Tegla Loroupe	10,000 metres	32:34.07	16 Q	—N/a				32:53.09	17
Pascaline Wangui	Marathon	—N/a						2:56:46	28

== Boxing ==
Athlete	Event	Round of 32	Round of 16	Quarterfinals	Semifinals	Final	
Athlete	Event	Opposition Result	Opposition Result	Opposition Result	Opposition Result	Opposition Result	Rank
James Wanene	Light flyweight	Velasco (PHI); L 1–16	Did not advance				
Benjamin Ngaruiya	Bantamweight	Calderón (MEX); L 4–16	Did not advance				
Nick Odore	Welterweight	Guzmán (VEN); W RSC R2	Chenglai (THA); L 10–13	Did not advance			
Joseph Akhasamba	Heavyweight	Bye	Johnson (CAN); L RSC R2	Did not advance			
David Anyim	Super heavyweight	Bye	Juškevičius (LTU); L RSC R2	Did not advance			

== Judo ==
Men

Athlete	Event	Round of 64	Round of 32	Round of 16	Quarterfinals	Semifinals	Repechage			Final	
Athlete	Event	Round of 64	Round of 32	Round of 16	Quarterfinals	Semifinals	Round 1	Round 2	Round 3	Final	
Athlete	Event	Opposition Result	Opposition Result	Opposition Result	Opposition Result	Opposition Result	Opposition Result	Opposition Result	Opposition Result	Opposition Result	Rank
Joseph Momanyi	65 kg	Jean (HAI); L	Did not advance								
Michael Oduor	86 kg	Bye	Legień (POL); L	Did not advance			Filipov (BUL); L	Did not advance			
Donald Obwoge	+95 kg	—N/a	Bye	Ogawa (JPN); L	Did not advance		Bye	Van Barneveld (BEL); L	Did not advance		

== Shooting ==
Men

Athlete	Event	Qualification		Final	
Athlete	Event	Points	Rank	Points	Rank
Shuaib Adam	10 metre air pistol	531	45	Did not advance	
Shuaib Adam	50 metre pistol	484	44	Did not advance	
Satiender Sehmi	50 metre rifle prone	579	52	Did not advance	

== Weightlifting ==
Athlete	Event	Snatch		Clean & jerk		Total	Rank
Athlete	Event	Result	Rank	Result	Rank	Total	Rank
Abdallah Juma	60 kg	100.0	29	115.0	28	215.0	28
