= Athletics at the 1994 Commonwealth Games – Men's 1500 metres =

Men's 1500 metres at the Commonwealth Games

The men's 1500 metres event at the 1994 Commonwealth Games was held at the Centennial Stadium in Victoria, British Columbia on 26‑28 August 1994.

The winning margin was 0.08 seconds which as of 2024 remains the narrowest winning margin in the men's 1500 metres at these games.

== Medalists ==
Gold	Silver	Bronze
Reuben Chesang; Kenya	Kevin Sullivan; Canada	John Mayock; England

== Results ==
=== Heats ===
Rank	Heat	Name	Nationality	Time	Notes
1	1	Julius Kipkoech Tanui	Kenya	3:44.10	Q
2	2	Kevin McKay	England	3:44.39	Q
3	2	Gareth Lough	Northern Ireland	3:44.54	Q
4	2	Steve Green	Jamaica	3:44.76	Q
5	2	Pat Scammell	Australia	3:44.82	Q
6	2	Gareth Brown	Scotland	3:45.03	Q
7	2	Whaddon Niewoudt	South Africa	3:45.20	Q
8	2	Geoffrey Seurey	Kenya	3:45.56	q
9	1	John Mayock	England	3:46.21	Q
10	1	Davey Wilson	Northern Ireland	3:46.86	Q
11	3	Reuben Chesang	Kenya	3:47.16	Q
12	2	Kenneth MacDonald	Canada	3:47.36	q
13	3	Passmore Furusa	Zimbabwe	3:47.37	Q
14	1	Julius Achon	Uganda	3:47.59	Q
15	3	Simon Doyle	Australia	3:47.73	Q
16	3	Kevin Sullivan	Canada	3:47.77	Q
17	3	David Strang	Scotland	3:47.80	Q
18	3	Andy Keith	England	3:48.09	Q
19	3	Brian Treacy	Northern Ireland	3:48.58	q
20	3	Richard Potts	New Zealand	3:48.67	q
21	1	Johan Landsman	South Africa	3:49.57	Q
22	3	Linton McKenzie	Jamaica	3:49.66	q
23	1	Graham Hood	Canada	3:49.67	Q
24	1	Desmond Hector	Guyana	3:53.28	q
25	1	Stephen Agar	Dominica	3:54.17	
26	1	Paea Funaki	Tonga	4:10.55	
27	2	Naseer Ismail	Maldives	4:10.66	
	2	Cedric Harris	Dominica	DNS	

=== Semifinals ===
Rank	Heat	Name	Nationality	Time	Notes
1	2	John Mayock	England	3:42.59	Q
2	2	Julius Kipkoech Tanui	Kenya	3:42.69	Q
3	2	Kevin McKay	England	3:43.18	Q
4	2	Julius Achon	Uganda	3:43.69	Q
5	2	Gareth Brown	Scotland	3:43.98	Q
6	2	Brian Treacy	Northern Ireland	3:44.50	q
7	2	Steve Green	Jamaica	3:45.85	q
8	1	Graham Hood	Canada	3:45.95	Q
9	1	Kevin Sullivan	Canada	3:46.16	Q
10	1	Reuben Chesang	Kenya	3:46.29	Q
11	1	David Strang	Scotland	3:46.30	Q
12	1	Whaddon Niewoudt	South Africa	3:46.42	Q
13	1	Andy Keith	England	3:46.52	
14	2	Geoffrey Seurey	Kenya	3:46.93	
15	1	Davey Wilson	Northern Ireland	3:47.11	
16	1	Simon Doyle	Australia	3:48.22	
17	1	Linton McKenzie	Jamaica	3:49.78	
18	2	Passmore Furusa	Zimbabwe	3:49.96	
19	1	Kenneth MacDonald	Canada	3:50.15	
20	1	Desmond Hector	Guyana	3:54.37	
21	1	Richard Potts	New Zealand	3:57.78	
22	2	Pat Scammell	Australia	4:01.95	
	2	Johan Landsman	South Africa	DNF	
	2	Gareth Lough	Northern Ireland	DQ	

=== Final ===
Rank	Name	Nationality	Time	Notes
1st place, gold medalist(s)	Reuben Chesang	Kenya	3:36.70	
2nd place, silver medalist(s)	Kevin Sullivan	Canada	3:36.78	
3rd place, bronze medalist(s)	John Mayock	England	3:37.22	
4	Whaddon Niewoudt	South Africa	3:37.96	
5	Julius Kipkoech Tanui	Kenya	3:38.10	
6	Brian Treacy	Northern Ireland	3:38.93	
7	Steve Green	Jamaica	3:39.19	NR
8	Kevin McKay	England	3:39.72	
9	Julius Achon	Uganda	3:40.10	
10	Graham Hood	Canada	3:41.23	
11	Gareth Brown	Scotland	3:42.66	
12	David Strang	Scotland	3:48.70	
