= 1986 World Junior Championships in Athletics – Men's 2000 metres steeplechase =

The men's 2000 metres steeplechase event at the 1986 World Junior Championships in Athletics was held in Athens, Greece, at Olympic Stadium on 18 and 20 July.

== Medalists ==
Gold	Jon Azkueta; Spain
Silver	Johnstone Kipkoech; Kenya
Bronze	Jens Volkmann; West Germany

== Results ==
=== Final ===
20 July

Rank	Name	Nationality	Time	Notes
1st place, gold medalist(s)	Jon Azkueta	Spain	5:28.56	
2nd place, silver medalist(s)	Johnstone Kipkoech	Kenya	5:29.56	
3rd place, bronze medalist(s)	Jens Volkmann	West Germany	5:29.60	
4	Tom Hanlon	United Kingdom	5:32.84	
5	José Luis Civera	Spain	5:33.83	
6	Vyacheslav Koshelev	Soviet Union	5:34.86	
7	Ángel Rodríguez	Cuba	5:35.99	
8	Stephen Connell	Canada	5:36.80	
9	Taoufik Boukrouma	Tunisia	5:40.95	
10	Abdelmaleh Amanallah	Morocco	5:40.96	
11	Viktor Shevlyakov	Soviet Union	5:44.93	
12	Reinhold Rogen	Italy	5:47.90	
13	Tomasz Szabliński	Poland	5:48.90	
	Claudio Nicostra	Italy	DNF	
	Jarosław Folta	Poland	DNF	

=== Heats ===
18 July

==== Heat 1 ====
Rank	Name	Nationality	Time	Notes
1	Johnstone Kipkoech	Kenya	5:37.31	Q
2	Tom Hanlon	United Kingdom	5:38.18	Q
3	Jens Volkmann	West Germany	5:38.64	Q
4	Ángel Rodríguez	Cuba	5:38.74	Q
5	Jarosław Folta	Poland	5:38.79	Q
6	Viktor Shevlyakov	Soviet Union	5:38.91	q
7	José Luis Civera	Spain	5:38.99	q
8	Abdelmaleh Amanallah	Morocco	5:44.16	q
9	Reinhold Rogen	Italy	5:44.39	q
10	Clodoaldo do Carmo	Brazil	5:47.62	
11	Fabrice Jonneau	France	5:48.63	
12	Juan Meza	Chile	5:54.54	
13	Zhelyazko Zhelev	Bulgaria	5:58.99	
14	Yeóryios Avramides	Greece	6:00.00	
15	Guy Schultz	Canada	6:03.26	
16	Brian Lenihan	United States	6:03.34	
17	Jamal Mahmoud Hamada	Palestine	6:03.38	

==== Heat 2 ====
Rank	Name	Nationality	Time	Notes
1	Vyacheslav Koshelev	Soviet Union	5:41.91	Q
2	Taoufik Boukrouma	Tunisia	5:42.49	Q
3	Jon Azkueta	Spain	5:43.97	Q
4	Stephen Connell	Canada	5:44.28	Q
5	Tomasz Szabliński	Poland	5:44.71	Q
6	Claudio Nicostra	Italy	5:45.64	q
7	Andreas Fischer	West Germany	5:48.03	
8	Patrick Woods	Australia	5:48.37	
9	Yoshinori Kosugi	Japan	5:48.55	
10	Abdel Aziz Sahere	Morocco	5:51.50	
11	Yeóryios Dimitrópoulos	Greece	5:51.85	
12	Guilherme Martins	Portugal	5:52.64	
13	Paul Hagendoren	Netherlands	5:57.84	
14	Joseph Meli Kiprobon	Kenya	5:58.18	
15	José Pestana	Cuba	5:59.18	
16	Michael Hedgecock	United States	6:05.51	
17	Martin Holmes	New Zealand	6:08.10	

== Participation ==
According to an unofficial count, 34 athletes from 23 countries participated in the event.

- Australia (1)
- Brazil (1)
- Bulgaria (1)
- Canada (2)
- Chile (1)
- Cuba (2)
- France (1)
- Greece (2)
- Italy (2)
- Japan (1)
- Kenya (2)
- Morocco (2)
- Netherlands (1)
- New Zealand (1)
- Palestine (1)
- Poland (2)
- Portugal (1)
- Soviet Union (2)
- Spain (2)
- Tunisia (1)
- United Kingdom (1)
- United States (2)
- West Germany (2)
