= Colin Walker (runner) =

English athlete

Colin Walker OLY
Personal information
- Nationality: British (English)
- Born: 29 October 1962 (age 63) Stockton-on-Tees, England
- Height: 1.73 m (5 ft 8 in)
- Weight: 61 kg (134 lb)

Sport
- Sport: Athletics
- Event: 3000 m steeplechase
- Club: Gateshead Harriers
Medal record
Athletics
Representing England
Commonwealth Games
Bronze medal – third place	1990 Auckland	3,000m steeplechase

Colin Frederick Walker (born 29 October 1962) is an English former athlete who specialised in the 3000 metres steeplechase who competed at the 1992 Summer Olympics.

== Biography ==
Born in Stockton-on-Tees, Walker represented Great Britain at the 1992 Olympic Games, at the World Championships in 1991 and 1993, and won a bronze medal representing England at the 1990 Commonwealth Games in Auckland, New Zealand.

Walker won the AAAs Championship title four times (1989, 1991–93) and the UK Championship title twice (1987, 1992). His personal best in the event is 8:25.15, set when winning the AAAs Championships (incorporating the Olympic trial) in Birmingham in 1992.

== International competitions ==
Year	Competition	Venue	Position	Event	Notes
Representing Great Britain / England
1989	European Indoor Championships	The Hague, Netherlands	16th (h)	3000 m	8:17.02
1990	Commonwealth Games	Auckland, New Zealand	3rd	3000 m s'chase	8:26.50
1990	European Championships	Split, Yugoslavia	16th (h)	3000 m s'chase	8:26.95
1991	World Championships	Tokyo, Japan	19th (h)	3000 m s'chase	8:30.69
1992	Olympic Games	Barcelona, Spain	17th (sf)	3000 m s'chase	8:34.82
1992	World Cup	Havana, Cuba	6th	3000 m s'chase	8:47.61
1993	World Championships	Stuttgart, Germany	23rd (h)	3000 m s'chase	8:36.22
1994	Commonwealth Games	Victoria, Canada	4th	3000 m s'chase	8:27.78
1994	World Cup	London, United Kingdom	4th	3000 m s'chase	8:41.14
(#) Indicates overall position in qualifying heats (h) or semifinals (sf)
