= Athletics at the 1995 Pan American Games – Men's 3000 metres steeplechase =

Men's 3,000 metres steeplechase at the Pan American Games

The men's 3000 metres steeplechase event at the 1995 Pan American Games was held at the Estadio Atletico "Justo Roman" on 22 March.

== Results ==
Rank	Name	Nationality	Time	Notes
1st place, gold medalist(s)	Wander Moura	Brazil	8:14.41	AR
2nd place, silver medalist(s)	Brian Diemer	United States	8:30.58	
3rd place, bronze medalist(s)	Dan Reese	United States	8:31.58	
4	Leonardo Malgor	Argentina	8:32.42	
5	Rubén García	Mexico	8:41.90	
6	Joël Bourgeois	Canada	8:45.62	
7	Marcelo Cascabelo	Argentina	8:54.84	
8	Marco Condori	Bolivia	9:07.42	
9	Terrance Armstrong	Bermuda	9:24.62	
	Ricardo Vera	Uruguay	DNF	
	Quintin John	Trinidad and Tobago	DNF	
	Eddy Punina	Ecuador	DNS	
