= Athletics at the 1990 Commonwealth Games – Men's 3000 metres steeplechase =

Men's 3000 metres steeplechase at the Commonwealth Games

The men's 3000 metres steeplechase event at the 1990 Commonwealth Games was held on 28 January at the Mount Smart Stadium in Auckland.

== Results ==
Rank	Name	Nationality	Time	Notes
1st place, gold medalist(s)	Julius Kariuki	Kenya	8:20.64	
2nd place, silver medalist(s)	Joshua Kipkemboi	Kenya	8:24.26	
3rd place, bronze medalist(s)	Colin Walker	England	8:26.50	
4	Graeme Fell	Canada	8:27.64	
5	Shaun Creighton	Australia	8:33.59	
6	Eddie Wedderburn	England	8:34.66	
7	Roger Hackney	Wales	8:36.62	
8	Peter Renner	New Zealand	8:38.61	
9	Gregor Cameron	New Zealand	8:42.08	
10	Alain Boucher	Canada	8:42.97	
11	Sean Wade	New Zealand	8:45.16	
12	Tom Hanlon	Scotland	8:45.76	
13	Mick Hawkins	England	8:48.93	
	Clive Hamilton	Jamaica	DNS	
