= Marcelo Cascabelo =

Argentine long-distance runner

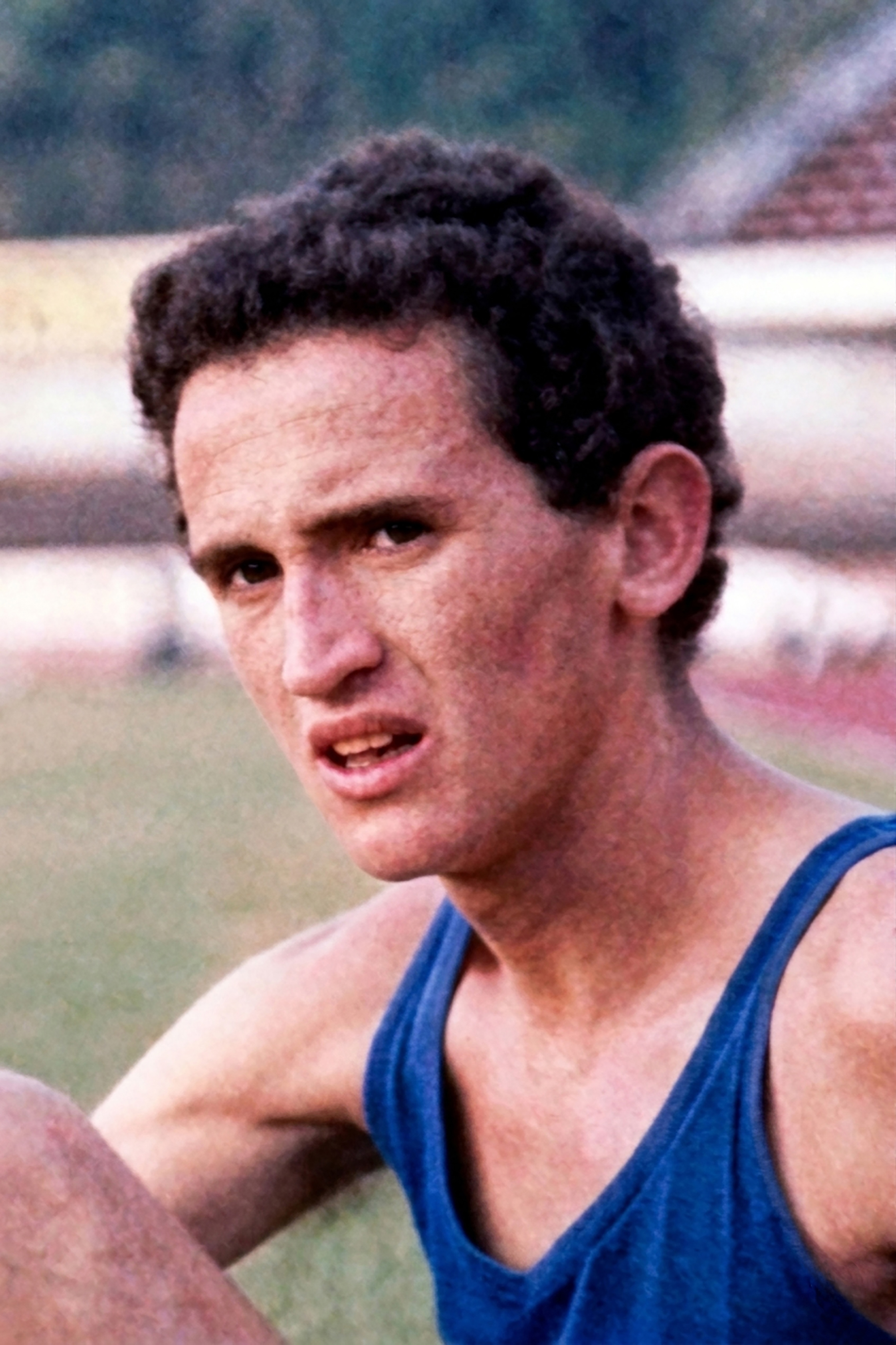
- Marcelo Cascabelo at the Municipal Stadium of Concepción, Chile, in 1983.

Personal information
- Born: February 6, 1964 (age 62) San Isidro, Argentina
- Height: 1.74 m (5 ft 9 in)
- Weight: 65 kg (143 lb)

Sport
- Sport: Athletics
- Event: 3000 m steeplechase
- Club: Gimnasia y Esgrima de Buenos Aires Argentina, Larios Spain

Marcelo Fabián Cascabelo Ferreyra (born 6 February 1964) is a retired Argentine long-distance runner who competed primarily in the 3000 metres steeplechase. He represented his country at the 1992 Summer Olympics without advancing from the first round. He also competed at one outdoor and one indoor World Championships. He won the Konex Award from Argentina in 1990.

== International competitions ==
Year	Competition	Venue	Position	Event	Notes
Representing Argentina
1983	South American Junior Championships	Medellín, Colombia	4th	1500 m	3:56.6
1983	South American Junior Championships	Medellín, Colombia	1st	2000 m s'chase	5:56.9
1983	South American Junior Championships	Medellín, Colombia	3rd	4 × 400 m relay	3:19.98
1983	South American Championships	Santa Fe, Argentina	8th	3000 m s'chase	9:20.3
1984	Friendship Games	Moscow, Soviet Union	11th	3000 m s'chase	9:15.48
1985	South American Championships	Santiago, Chile	9th	1500 m	3:56.35
1985	South American Championships	Santiago, Chile	4th	3000 m s'chase	9:00.49
1986	Ibero-American Championships	Havana, Cuba	8th	5000 m	14:10.44
1986	Ibero-American Championships	Havana, Cuba	6th	3000 m s'chase	9:10.50
1986	South American Games	Santiago, Chile	2nd	1500 m	3:45.61
1986	South American Games	Santiago, Chile	2nd	3000 m s'chase	8:44.15
1987	Pan American Games	Indianapolis, United States	5th	5000 m	13:56.91
1987	Pan American Games	Indianapolis, United States	6th	3000 m s'chase	8:41.76
1991	Pan American Games	Havana, Cuba	4th	3000 m s'chase	8:37.90
1991	World Championships	Tokyo, Japan	27th (h)	3000 m s'chase	8:44.57
1992	Ibero-American Championships	Seville, Spain	5th	3000 m s'chase	8:43.21
1992	Olympic Games	Barcelona, Spain	26th (h)	3000 m s'chase	8:38.89
1993	World Half Marathon Championships	Brussels, Belgium	93rd	Half marathon	1:05:52
1993	South American Championships	Lima, Peru	3rd	1500 m	3:51.50
1993	South American Championships	Lima, Peru	2nd	3000 m s'chase	8:38.80
1994	Goodwill Games	Saint Petersburg, Russia	8th	3000 m s'chase	8:42.59
1995	World Indoor Championships	Barcelona, Spain	21st (h)	3000 m	8:14.97
1995	Pan American Games	Mar del Plata, Argentina	7th	3000 m s'chase	8:54.84
1995	World Half Marathon Championships	Montbéliard – Belfort, France	86th	Half marathon	1:06:48
1996	World Half Marathon Championships	Palma, Spain	–	Half marathon	DNF

== Personal bests ==
Outdoor

- 3000 metres – 8:30.61 (Granada 1989)
- 5000 metres – 13:40.70 (A Coruña 1989)
- 10,000 metres – 28:28.22 (Maia 1992)
- 2000 metres steeplechase – 5:25.69 (Verona 1992) NR
- 3000 metres steeplechase – 8:25.63 (Belgrade 1989) NR

Indoor

- 3000 metres – 8:14.97 (Barcelona 1995)
