= Gregor Cameron =

Former Track and field athlete

Personal information
- Born: Gregor Ewen Cameron; 11 January 1964 (age 62) Dunedin, New Zealand
- Education: East Otago High School; University of Waikato
- Occupation: Schoolteacher

Sport
- Country: New Zealand
- Sport: Track and field

Achievements and titles
- National finals: 3000 m steeplechase champion (1986, 1988)

Gregor Ewen Cameron (born 11 January 1964) is a former New Zealand athlete who represented his country at the 1990 Commonwealth Games.

== Early life and family ==
Cameron was born in Dunedin on 11 January 1964, the son of Linda and Clive Cameron, and educated at East Otago High School. He went on to study at the University of Waikato, completing a Bachelor of Social Sciences in 1986, and Hamilton Teachers' College, where he was awarded a Diploma of Teaching in 1988.

In 1988, Cameron married Karenza de Silva.

== Athletics ==
Cameron won the New Zealand national men's 3000 m steeplechase title in 1986 and 1988. He represented New Zealand in the 3000 m steeplechase at the 1990 Commonwealth Games in Auckland. He finished ninth, recording a time of 8:42.08.

In 1990, Cameron was awarded the New Zealand 1990 Commemoration Medal.
