= Johnstone Kipkoech =

Kenyan steeplechase runner

Medal record

Men's athletics

Representing Kenya

Commonwealth Games
Gold medal – first place	1994 Victoria	3000 m steeplechase

Johnstone Kipkoech (born 20 December 1968) is a Kenyan track and field athlete who won the gold medal in the 3000 metres steeplechase at the 1994 Commonwealth Games in Victoria, British Columbia, Canada in a games record time of 8:14.72 that stood until the 2014 Commonwealth Games.
