= Ricardo Vera =

Uruguayan long-distance runner

Personal information
- Born: September 16, 1962 (age 64) Montevideo, Uruguay

Sport
- Sport: Track and field
Medal record
Athletics
Representing Uruguay
Pan American Games
Silver medal – second place	1991 Havana	3000m steeplechase
South American Games
Gold medal – first place	1982 Santa Fe	5000 m
Silver medal – second place	1982 Santa Fe	1500 m

Ricardo Cirilo Vera Rebollo (born September 16, 1962) is a retired long-distance runner from Uruguay.

== Career ==
Vera competed for his native country in the men's 3.000 metres Steeplechase at two consecutive Summer Olympics, starting in 1992.

== International competitions ==
Year	Competition	Venue	Position	Event	Notes
Representing Uruguay
1982	Southern Cross Games	Santa Fe, Argentina	2nd	1500 m	3:48.85
1982	Southern Cross Games	Santa Fe, Argentina	1st	5000 m	14:07.4
1983	World Championships	Helsinki, Finland	29th (sf)	5000 m	14:20.20
1983	Pan American Games	Caracas, Venezuela	7th	1500 m	3:48.64
1983	Pan American Games	Caracas, Venezuela	9th	5000 m	14:34.57
1983	South American Championships	Santa Fe, Argentina	4th	1500 m	3:51.3
1983	South American Championships	Santa Fe, Argentina	10th	5000 m	14:54.8
1983	South American Championships	Santa Fe, Argentina	4th	3000 m steeple	8:53.9
1985	South American Championships	Santiago, Chile	3rd	1500 m	3:46.87
1985	South American Championships	Santiago, Chile	2nd	3000 m steeple	8:44.85
1986	Goodwill Games	Moscow, Soviet Union	12th	5000 m	14:16.44
1986	Goodwill Games	Moscow, Soviet Union	15th	10,000 m	29:39.61
1986	Goodwill Games	Moscow, Soviet Union	12th	3000 m steeple	8:38.28
1986	Ibero-American Championships	Havana, Cuba	10th	5000 m	14:22.53
1986	Ibero-American Championships	Havana, Cuba	3rd	3000 m steeple	8:34.92
1987	Pan American Games	Indianapolis, United States	12th	5000 m	14:48.97
1987	Pan American Games	Indianapolis, United States	5th	3000 m steeple	8:39.34
1987	World Championships	Rome, Italy	25th (h)	3000 m steeple	8:36.80
1987	South American Championships	São Paulo, Brazil	7th	1500 m	3:50.91
1987	South American Championships	São Paulo, Brazil	3rd	3000 m steeple	8:58.99
1989	South American Championships	Medellín, Colombia	5th	1500 m	3:53.3 A
1989	South American Championships	Medellín, Colombia	3rd	3000 m steeple	8:57.5 A
1990	Ibero-American Championships	Manaus, Brazil	2nd	3000 m steeple	8:39.86
1991	World Indoor Championships	Seville, Spain	18th (h)	3000 m	8:06.81
1991	Pan American Games	Havana, Cuba	2nd	3000 m steeple	8:36.83
1991	World Championships	Tokyo, Japan	17th (h)	3000 m steeple	8:30.14
1992	Olympic Games	Barcelona, Spain	12th	3000 m steeple	8:26.35
1993	World Championships	Stuttgart, Germany	12th	3000 m steeple	8:29.00
1994	Goodwill Games	St. Petersburg, Russia	11th	3000 m steeple	8:58.96
1995	Pan American Games	Mar del Plata, Argentina	–	3000 m steeple	DNF
1995	World Championships	Gothenburg, Sweden	28th (h)	3000 m steeple	8:33.95
1996	Olympic Games	Atlanta, Georgia	26th (h)	3000 m steeple	8:40.78
