= Daniel Lopez (athlete) =

American middle-distance runner

Personal information
- Born: September 25, 1968 (age 58) Chicago, Illinois, United States

Sport
- Sport: Middle-distance running
- Event: Steeplechase

Daniel Lopez (born September 25, 1968) is an American middle-distance runner. He competed in the men's 3000 metres steeplechase at the 1992 Summer Olympics.

Lopez competed for the Oregon Ducks track and field team in the NCAA.
