= Brian Diemer =

American track and field athlete

Personal information
- Born: October 10, 1961 (age 64) Grand Rapids, Michigan, U.S.
Medal record
Men's athletics
Representing United States
Olympic Games
Bronze medal – third place	1984 Los Angeles	3000m steeplechase
Pan American Games
Silver medal – second place	1995 Mar del Plata	3000m steeplechase

Brian Lee Diemer (born October 10, 1961) is an American former track and field athlete, who mainly competed in the 3000 metre steeplechase during his career. He was high school state champion in the mile while running at South Christian High School in Grand Rapids, Michigan. He graduated from the University of Michigan in 1983 after taking third in the 2 mile at the NCAA Indoor Track and Field Championships, held in nearby Detroit. He won the outdoor 1983 NCAA 3000m Steeplechase in a time of 8:26.95.

He competed for the United States in the 1984 Summer Olympics held in Los Angeles, United States in the 3000 metre steeplechase where he won the bronze medal in a career best time of 8:14.06. He won the British AAA Championships title in the steeplechase event at the 1985 AAA Championships.

He ran in the 1988 Summer Olympics, finishing seventh in his semi final. He made his third Olympic team in 1992, going on to qualify for the final, where he finished seventh (in 8:18.77). He had fine showings at two World Championships in which he participated, finishing fourth in the 1987 World Championships in Athletics (in 8:14.46) and fifth at the 1991 World Championships in Athletics (in 8:17.76). Diemer won four The Athletics Congress (TAC) and U.S. Track and Field (USATF) championships over that time (1988, 1989, 1990 and 1992). In 1989 he received the Glenn Cunningham Award as the outstanding American male distance runner for the year.

He is now retired after coaching at Calvin University in Grand Rapids, Michigan, and has coached the Knights to four national championships.

He and his wife, Kerri, have four children.

== International competitions ==
Year	Competition	Venue	Position	Notes
Representing the United States
1983	World Championships	Helsinki, Finland	13th (s)	8:23.39
1984	Olympic Games	Los Angeles, United States	3rd	8:14.06
1987	World Championships	Rome, Italy	4th	8:14.46
1988	Olympic Games	Seoul, South Korea	15th (s)	8:23.89
1989	World Cup	Barcelona, Spain	4th	8:24.52
1990	Goodwill Games	Seattle, United States	1st	8:32.24
1991	World Championships	Tokyo, Japan	5th	8:18.29
1992	Olympic Games	Barcelona, Spain	7th	8:18.77
1993	World Championships	Stuttgart, Germany	31st (h)	9:01.88
1995	Pan American Games	Mar del Plata, Argentina	2nd	8:30.58

(#) Indicates overall position achieved in the semis (s) or heats (h).
