= Ville Hautala =

Finnish middle-distance runner

Personal information
- Nationality: Finnish
- Born: 19 November 1968 (age 57)

Sport
- Sport: Middle-distance running
- Event: Steeplechase

Ville Hautala (born 19 November 1968) is a Finnish middle-distance runner. He competed in the men's 3000 metres steeplechase at the 1992 Summer Olympics.
