= Mohammed al-Dosari =

Saudi Arabian runner

Medal record

Men's athletics

Representing Saudi Arabia

Asian Championships
Silver medal – second place	1989 New Delhi	3000 m steeplechase

Mohammed Barak al-Dosari (Arabic: محمد براك الدوسري; born 8 December 1961) is a Saudi Arabian runner who specialized in the 3000 metres steeplechase. He competed at the 1991 World Championships and at the Olympic Games in 1988 and 1992.

His best international performances were a silver medal at 1989 Asian Championships and a gold medal at the 1992 Pan Arab Games. He also won the Gulf Cooperation Council Championships in 1986 and 1992.
