= Abdelaziz Sahere =

Moroccan long-distance runner

Medal record

Men's athletics

Representing Morocco

African Championships
| Gold medal – first place | 1990 Cairo | 3000 m st. |
| Silver medal – second place | 1988 Annaba | 3000 m st. |
| Silver medal – second place | 1990 Cairo | 1500 m |

Abdelaziz Sahere (born 1 January 1967) is a Moroccan long-distance runner who competed mostly over 1500 metres and 3000 metre steeplechase.

== Achievements ==
| Year | Competition | Venue | Position | Notes |
Representing Morocco
| 1988 | African Championships | Annaba, Algeria | 2nd | 3,000 m steeple |
| 1990 | African Championships | Cairo, Egypt | 2nd | 1,500 metres |
| 1990 | African Championships | Cairo, Egypt | 1st | 3,000 m steeple |
| 1991 | World Indoor Championships | Seville, Spain | 8th | 1.500 metres |
| 1991 | Mediterranean Games | Athens, Greece | 3rd | 3,000 m steeple |
| 1991 | World Championships | Tokyo, Japan | 6th | 3,000 m steeple |
| 1993 | Mediterranean Games | Languedoc-Roussillon, France | 1st | 3,000 m steeple |
| 1993 | World Championships | Stuttgart, Germany | 13th | 3,000 m steeple |
