= Reuben Chesang =

Kenyan middle- and long-distance runner

Medal record

Men's athletics

Representing Kenya

Commonwealth Games
Gold medal – first place	1994 Victoria	1500 m

Reuben Chesang (born 22 December 1962) is a Kenyan middle- and long-distance runner, who won the gold medal in the 1500 metres at the 1994 Commonwealth Games in Victoria, British Columbia, Canada.

He now lives and trains in Allen, Texas, having lived in several other locations in the United States. Aged 37 he competed in his first marathon and he has since won the Pittsburgh, Mexico City, Hartford, Connecticut and Richmond, Virginia marathons and in 2012 he was still categorized as an elite athlete for the Boston Marathon.
