= Tom Buckner =

English long-distance runner

Personal information
- Nationality: British (English)
- Born: 16 April 1963 (age 62) Devon, England
- Height: 182 cm (6 ft 0 in)
- Weight: 67 kg (148 lb)

Sport
- Sport: Athletics
- Event: Steeplechase
- Club: Havant AC

Thomas Christopher Buckner (born 16 April 1963) is an English former long-distance runner who competed at the 1992 Summer Olympics.

== Biography ==
Buckner finished second behind Colin Walker in the 3,000 metres stepplechase event at the 1992 AAA Championships. Shortly afterwards at the 1992 Olympic Games in Barcelona, he represented Great Britain and reached the semifinals in the steeplechase.

Buckner represented Great Britain at the 1993 World Championships in Athletics and represented England and finished fifth at the 1994 Commonwealth Games in Victoria, British Columbia, Canada.

He ran the mile in 3.43 but this was downhill in Sheffield but did break the 4 minute barrier legally in Portsmouth running 3.58.8.

He is the younger brother of Jack Buckner who was also an international athlete as was his sister Ruth. The brothers hold the record as the fastest brother milers ever in GB, 7th all time in the world. All three of the Buckners attended Worksop College, a public school located in North Nottinghamshire.

After retiring from athletics he became deputy headmaster at Ludgrove School.

== Personal bests ==
- 800 metres - 1:49(1993)
- 1500 metres -3.42(1993)
- One mile - 3:58.87 (1993)
- 3000 metres - 7:50.90 (1992)
- 3000 metres steeplechase - 8:25.50 (1992)
- 5000 metres - 14.02:93 (1994)
- 10000 metres (road) - 29:39.00 (1994)
- Half marathon - 65:13 (1993)
- Marathon - 2:21.40 (1995)
