= Ivan Konovalov (runner) =

Russian athlete

Personal information
- Nationality: Russian
- Born: 6 July 1959 (age 67) Irkutsk, Soviet Union

Sport
- Sport: Middle-distance running
- Event: Steeplechase

Ivan Konovalov (born 6 July 1959) is a Russian middle-distance runner. He competed in the men's 3000 metres steeplechase at the 1992 Summer Olympics.
