= Jens Volkmann =

German middle-distance runner (born 1967)

Personal information
- Nationality: German
- Born: 31 May 1967 (age 59) Berlin, Germany

Sport
- Sport: Middle-distance running
- Event: Steeplechase

Jens Volkmann (born 31 May 1967) is a German middle-distance runner. He competed in the men's 3000 metres steeplechase at the 1988 Summer Olympics.
