= Thierry Brusseau =

French athlete (born 1964)

Personal information
- Born: July 22, 1964 (age 62) Marvejols, Lozère, France

Sport
- Sport: Track and field
Medal record
Representing France
Mediterranean Games
Bronze medal – third place	1993 Languedoc	3000m steeplechase
Summer Universiade
Bronze medal – third place	1989 Duisburg	3000m steeplechase

Thierry Brusseau (born July 22, 1964) is a former track and field athlete from France, who mainly competed in the men's 3.000 metres steeplechase during his career. His personal best was 8:22.22, achieved in 1991. He competed in the men's 3000 metres steeplechase at the 1992 Summer Olympics.

== Achievements ==
- All results regarding 3.000 metres steeplechase, unless stated otherwise

Year	Competition	Venue	Position	Notes
Representing France
1989	Summer Universiade	Duisburg, West Germany	3rd	8:35.78
1991	World Championships	Tokyo, Japan	13th	8:47.46
1992	Olympic Games	Barcelona, Spain	23rd	8:42.48
1993	World Championships	Stuttgart, Germany	27th	8:39.82
