= William Mutwol =

Kenyan middle-distance runner

Medal record

Men's athletics

Representing Kenya

Olympic Games
Bronze medal – third place	1992 Barcelona	3000 m st.

African Championships
Silver medal – second place	1990 Cairo	3000 m st.

William Mutwol (born 10 October 1962) is a former middle distance runner from Kenya. Running in 8:10.74 he won the bronze medal in 3,000 metres steeplechase at the 1992 Summer Olympics.
