= João Junqueira =

Portuguese long-distance runner (born 1965)

João Manuel Perera Junqueira (born 24 June 1965 in Chaves, Alto Trás-os-Montes) is a retired Portuguese runner who specialized in the 3000 metres steeplechase.

He competed in his special event at the 1991, 1993 and 1999 World Championships and placed sixth in the 10,000 m in 1994 European Athletics Championships as well as the 1992 Summer Olympics.

At the 1993 World Cross Country Championships he earned the distinction of a bronze medal in the team competition, having finished 41st in the individual long race. He then recorded his best placing with a 23rd place in the 1998 short race, the team finishing fifth. He was also a part of the sixth-place Portuguese team at the 2001 World Cross Country Championships.

== Personal bests ==
- 3000 metres - 7.47:26 min (1994)
- 5000 metres - 13.22:3 min (1994)
- 10,000 metres - 27.53:74 min (1994)
- 3000 metres steeplechase - 8.25:81 min (1993)
- Half marathon - 1.02:38 hrs (1997)

João Junqueira started practicing Athletics at the Ginasio Clube de Chaves, which he represented until 1984. Later he passed through ANA and Salgueiros, until reaching Benfica in 1988 where he was until 1990, when he was Portuguese Champion in the 3000m steeplechase, which was your main specialty.

He joined Sporting Clube de Portugal in 1991 and was in the service of the Sporting Club, where he was coached, among others, by Moniz Pereira and Bernardo Manuel, who lived the best years of his career, beating his personal records in the 3000m (7.47: 26), 5000m (13.22: 3), 10000m (27.53: 64) and 3000m steeplechase (8.25: 81, which was the track record of the Jose Alvalade Stadium).

It became an important element in Sporting's teams, namely in cross country, contributing to the conquest of several titles, with natural highlight to the 4 European Champion Cups won between 1991 and 1994, a competition that got the third best place.

He was also part of Sporting's teams that won 3 editions of the Cascais-Lisboa Relay between 1992 and 1994, and in 1993 was crowned the Portuguese Champion for the 2nd time in the 3000m steeplechase.

In 1994 he was distinguished with the Stromp Prize in the Athlete category after a great season, in which he won São Silvestre dos Olivais, was cross country Regional Champion and Portugal Champion in the 1500m, and twice improved his personal 5000m record. Championships, where they achieved an excellent 6th place in the 10000m.

He was present at the 1992 Olympic Games in Barcelona, where she reached the 3000m steeplechase International 35 times, also represented Portugal in the European Cup, with a victory in the 3000m steeplechase in 1991.

He participated in three editions of the 10000m European Cup, a competition where he was never happy, always giving up, but was nevertheless part of the teams of Portugal that at the time won a Gold and two Silver Medal.

At cross country he was present in 4 World Championships, having been part of the National Teams that won the Bronze Medal in 1993 and 1999 and in 4 European Championships, in which Portugal won 3 Gold and 1 Silver Medals.

World Champion Military Cross Country Championships in 1992.

· Olympic in Barcelona 92; 21st in the 3000m steeplechase.

· Military World Champion in Short Cross 1992 - Nigeria.

· Vice World Military Champion in Short Cross, 1993 - Netherlands; 1994 - Ireland; 1998 - Ireland.

· Bronze medal at the world military in Short Cross, 1990 - Canada; 1997 - Senegal.

· World Military Crosse Champion, teams, 1992 - Nigeria; 1993 - Netherlands; 1994 - Ireland; 1998 - Ireland, 1999 - United States.

· 15th World Ranking 10,000m, 1994.

· National record holder in 4 × 1500 m.

· Champion of Portugal in 1500m (1994) and 3000m steeplechase (1991 and 1993).

· Teams Bronze Medal at the Crosse Country World Championship - Amorabieta 1993 and the Crosse Country World Championship - Belfast 1999.

· Teams Silver Medal at the European Cross Country Championship - Ferrara 1998.

· Ranked 6th in 10,000m at the European Athletics Championships - Helsinki 1994.

· 1st place in the European Athletics Cup - 3000m steeplechase, 1991, Viseu.

· 2nd place in the European Athletics Cup - 5000m, 1994, Dublin.

· 3rd place in the European Athletics Cup – 3000m, 1998, Budapest.

· 3rd place in the European Athletics Cup - 3000m steeplechase, 2000, Oslo.

· 3rd place in the European Champion Crosse Country Clubs' Cup.

· 1st place in the European Champion Clubs' Cup – 3000m steeplechase – 1990, Belgrado.

· 2nd place in the Westatletic - 3000m steeplechase - 1992, Brussels.

· 1st place in the Foursquare - 3000m steeplechase - 1991, Ostrava.

· 2nd place in the Ranked Foursquare - 3000m steeplechase - 1989, Swansea.

· 1st place in the Classified in Triangular Portugal, Spain and Italy - 5000m, Corunna 1988.

· Winner of Volvic International Crosse Country (France) in 1987 and 1989.

· Winner of International Crosse Country d'Allones (France) in 1993.

· Winner of the Rolde International Half Marathon (Netherlands), 2005.

· Winner of the São Silvestre da Amadora race, 1992 with Record of the course.

· Winner of the São Silvestre dos Olivais race, 1993 with Record of the course.

· 5 National Crosse Country Champion, teams (1993, 1998, 1999, 2000 and 2003).

· 5 European Crosse Country Champion teams (1992, 1993, 1997 and 1998).

· ^{4th} place in the Ibero-American Championships - 3000m steeplechase, 1998, Lisbon.

• 2nd at the Kraków (Czechoslovakia) Meeting, 1989 - 3000m. •

· 2nd place at the Meeting of Warsaw (Poland), 1989 - 5000m.

· 2nd place in the meeting of Saint-Denis (France), 1991 - 3000m steeplechase.

· 2nd place in the Jean Boin Trophy - Barcelona, 1992. •

· 2nd place in the Meeting of Pontevedra (Spain), 1993 - 5000m.

· 3rd place in the Crosse Dunkirk (France), 1993.

· 2nd at the Meeting de Reims (France), 1994 - 5000m. •

· 1st place in the Meeting of Vitoria (Spain), 1992 - 3000m steeplechase.

· • Several times Lisbon regional champion.

· Multiple times winner of the 1st Division Club Championship.

Awards and Decorations

• Awarded “The Double Gold Star of Sports Merit” by the International Military Sports Council (CISM), February 28, 2002

• Honored by the Portuguese Athletics Federation for “In recognition of the outstanding sports career and contribution to the progress of National Athletics”, July 29, 2007

• 1997, 1998 and 1999 Fundação do Desporto Award

• Chaves City Medal of Merit in 2017

• Honored by Sintra City Council for relevant results, September 17, 2009

• Stromp Award 1994

• Revelation of the Year Atletismo Magazine 1987

• Gandula Trophy, Gazette of Sports 1992
