= Patrick Sang =

Kenyan running coach and retired runner (born 1964)

Personal information
- Born: 11 April 1964 (age 62) Kapsisiywa, Nandi District, Kenya

Sport
- Country: Kenya
- Sport: Athletics
- Event: 3000 metres steeplechase
- Now coaching: Eliud Kipchoge; Faith Kipyegon

Achievements and titles
- Personal best: 3000 m st.: 8:03.41 (Cologne 1997)
Medal record
Men's athletics
Representing Kenya
Olympic Games
Silver medal – second place	1992 Barcelona	3000 m steeplechase
World Championships
Silver medal – second place	1991 Tokyo	3000 m steeplechase
Silver medal – second place	1993 Stuttgart	3000 m steeplechase
All-Africa Games
Gold medal – first place	1987 Nairobi	3000 m steeplechase
Summer Universiade
Gold medal – first place	1989 Duisburg	3000 m steeplechase

Patrick Sang (born 11 April 1964) is a Kenyan running coach and retired steeplechase runner.

Sang won three silver medals in major 3000 m steeplechase competitions:

- 1991 World Championships in Athletics
- 1992 Summer Olympics
- 1993 World Championships in Athletics

He won the gold medal at the 1987 All-Africa Games held in Kenya.

His 3000 m steeplechase personal best is 8:03.41, set in 1997. In the late 1990s, he also competed in marathon and half marathon races.

Collegiately, he competed for the Texas Longhorns.

Sang is the coach of Eliud Kipchoge, the 2016 and 2020 Olympic marathon champion who broke the marathon world record in 2018 and 2022 and also became the first man to run the marathon distance in under 2 hours, and Faith Kipyegon, double Olympic and world 1500 metres champion.

Olympic Games
Preceded by Patrick Waweru	Flagbearer for Kenya; Barcelona 1992	Succeeded by Paul Tergat
