= Whaddon Niewoudt =

South African athlete

Personal information
- Nationality: South African
- Born: 6 January 1970 (age 56)

Sport
- Sport: Middle-distance running
- Event: Steeplechase
Medal record
Men's athletics
Representing South Africa
African Championships
Gold medal – first place	1992 Belle Vue Harel	3000 m st.

Whaddon Niewoudt (born 6 January 1970) is a South African middle-distance runner. He competed in the men's 3000 metres steeplechase at the 1992 Summer Olympics. Later in his career, Niewoudt participated in road events as well; he was part of the South African team at the 2000 Chiba Ekiden marathon relay, helping the team finish in 2nd place.
