= 3000 metres steeplechase =

Most common distance for the steeplechase in track and field

Athletics 3000 Metres Steeplechase
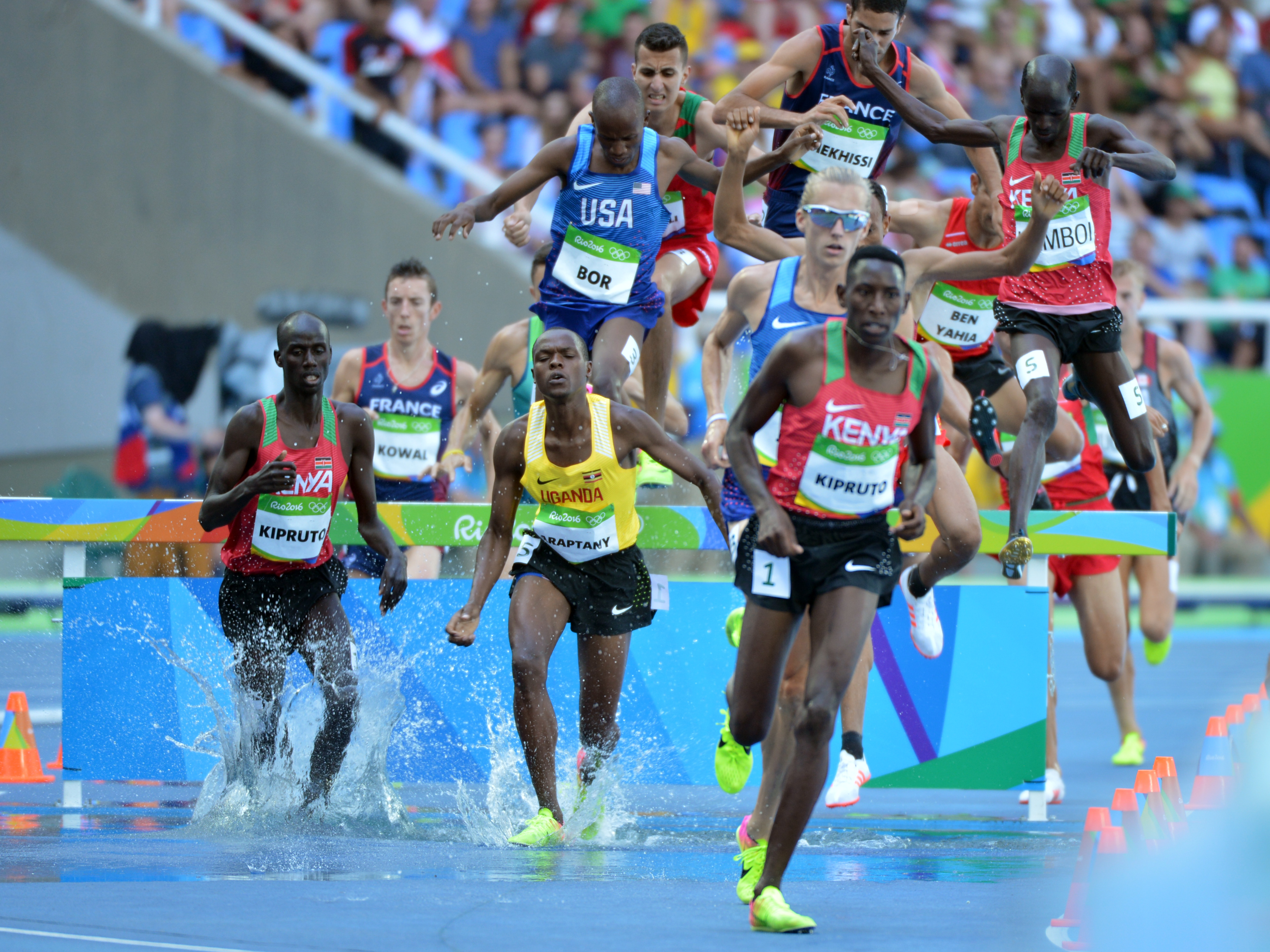
- 3000 m steeplechase at Rio 2016

World records
- Men: (Ethiopia) Lamecha Girma 7:52.11 (2023)
- Women: (Kenya) Beatrice Chepkoech 8:44.32 (2018)

Olympic records
- Men: (Kenya) Conseslus Kipruto 8:03.28 (2016)
- Women: (Bahrain) Winfred Yavi 8:52.76 (2024)

World Championship records
- Men: (Kenya) Ezekiel Kemboi 8:00.43 (2009)
- Women: (Kenya) Faith Cherotich 8:51.59 (2025)

The 3000 metres steeplechase or 3000-meter steeplechase (usually abbreviated as 3000mSC) is the most common distance for the steeplechase in track and field. It is an obstacle race over the distance of the 3000 metres, which derives its name from the horse racing steeplechase.

== Rules ==
It is one of the track events in the Olympic Games and the World Athletics Championships, and it is also an event recognized by World Athletics. The obstacles for men are 91.4 centimetres (36 in) high, and for women, they are 76.2 centimetres (30 in) high.

The water jump consists of a barrier followed by a pit of water with a landing area defined as follows: The pit is 3.66 m (12 feet) square. The pit's forward-direction measurement starts from the approach edge of the barrier and ends at the point where the water jump slope reaches the flat surface of the steeple pathway. The rulebook simply but clearly states, "The water jump, including the hurdle, shall be 3.66 m in length." Pits have an upward slope; the water is deeper near the barrier and is within 2 cm of ground level at the departure end. That slope begins approximately 30 cm (12 in) forward of the barrier, at which point the water is 70 cm (28 in) deep.

The length of the race is usually 3,000 metres (1.86 miles); junior and some masters events are 2,000 metres (1.24 miles), as women's events used to be. The circuit has four ordinary barriers and one water jump. During the race, each runner must clear a total of 28 ordinary barriers and seven water jumps. This entails seven complete laps after starting with a fraction of a lap run without barriers. The water jump is located on the back turn, either inside the inner lane or outside the outer lane. If it is on the outside, then each of the seven laps is longer than the standard 400 m, and the starting point is on the home straight. If the water jump is on the inside, each lap is shorter than 400 m, and the starting point is on the back straight, so the water jump and barrier in the home straight are bypassed in the first half lap at the start.

The dimension of an obstacle

Unlike those used in hurdling, steeplechase barriers do not fall over if hit, and the rules allow an athlete to negotiate the barrier by any means, so many runners step on top of them. Four barriers are spaced around the track on level ground, and a fifth barrier at the top of the second turn (fourth barrier in a complete lap from the finish line) is the water jump. The slope of the water jump rewards runners with more jumping ability, because a longer jump results in a shallower landing in the water.

== Area records ==
- Updated 22 June 2026.

Area	Men			Women		
Area	Time	Season	Athlete	Time	Season	Athlete
World	7:52.11	2023	Lamecha Girma (ETH)	8:44.32	2018	Beatrice Chepkoech (KEN)
Area records
Africa (records)	7:52.11	2023	Lamecha Girma (ETH)	8:44.32	2018	Beatrice Chepkoech (KEN)
Asia (records)	7:53.63	2004	Saif Saaeed Shaheen (QAT)	8:44.39	2024	Winfred Yavi (BHR)
Europe (records)	7:57.80	2026	Frederik Ruppert (GER)	8:58.67	2024	Alice Finot (FRA)
North, Central America and Caribbean (records)	8:00.45	2015	Evan Jager (USA)	8:57.77	2021	Courtney Frerichs (USA)
Oceania (records)	8:09.64	2024	Geordie Beamish (NZL)	9:14.28	2016	Genevieve Gregson (AUS)
South America (records)	8:14.41	1995	Wander Moura (BRA)	9:24.38	2022	Tatiane Raquel da Silva (BRA)

== All-time top 25 ==
Tables show data for two definitions of "Top 25" - the top 25 3000 m steeplechase times and the top 25 athletes:
- denotes top performance for athletes in the top 25 3000 m steeplechase times
- denotes lesser performances, still in the top 25 3000 m steeplechase times, by repeat athletes
- denotes top performance (only) for other top 25 athletes who fall outside the top 25 3000 m steeplechase times

=== Men ===
- Correct as of August 2026.

Ath.#	Perf.#	Time	Athlete	Nation	Date	Place	Ref.
1	1	7:52.11	Lamecha Girma	Ethiopia	9 June 2023	Paris	
2	2	7:53.63	Saif Saaeed Shaheen^{1}	Qatar	3 September 2004	Brussels	
3	3	7:53.64	Brimin Kipruto	Kenya	22 July 2011	Monaco	
4	4	7:54.31	Paul Kipsiele Koech	Kenya	31 May 2012	Rome	
5	5	7:55.28	Brahim Boulami	Morocco	24 August 2001	Brussels	
	6	7:55.51	Shaheen #2		26 August 2005	Brussels	
6	7	7:55.72	Bernard Barmasai	Kenya	24 August 1997	Cologne	
7	8	7:55.76	Ezekiel Kemboi	Kenya	22 July 2011	Monaco	
8	9	7:56.16	Moses Kiptanui	Kenya	24 August 1997	Cologne	
	10	7:56.32	Shaheen #3		3 July 2006	Athens	
	11	7:56.34	Shaheen #4		8 July 2005	Rome	
	12	7:56.37	Koech #2		8 July 2005	Rome	
	13	7:56.54	Shaheen #5		18 August 2006	Zürich	
	14	7:56.58	Koech #3		11 May 2012	Doha	
9	15	7:56.68	Soufiane El Bakkali	Morocco	28 May 2023	Rabat	
10	16	7:56.81	Richard Mateelong	Kenya	11 May 2012	Doha	
	17	7:56.94	Shaheen #6		19 September 2004	Monaco	
	18	7:57.25	El Bakkali #2		31 May 2026	Rabat	
	19	7:57.28	Shaheen #7		14 June 2005	Athens	
11	20	7:57.29	Reuben Kosgei	Kenya	24 August 2001	Brussels	
	21	7:57.32	Koech #4		22 July 2011	Monaco	
	22	7:57.38	Shaheen #8		14 September 2003	Monaco	
	23	7:57.42	Koech #5		14 September 2003	Monaco	
12	24	7:57.80	Frederik Ruppert	Germany	31 May 2026	Rabat	
	25	7:58.09	Boulami #2		19 July 2002	Monaco	
13		7:58.41	Jairus Birech	Kenya	5 September 2014	Brussels	
14		7:59.08	Wilson Boit Kipketer	Kenya	13 August 1997	Zürich	
15		7:59.44	Simon Koech	Kenya	31 May 2026	Rabat	
16		8:00.09	Mahiedine Mekhissi-Benabbad	France	6 July 2013	Saint-Denis	
17		8:00.12	Conseslus Kipruto	Kenya	5 June 2016	Birmingham	
18		8:00.45	Evan Jager	United States	4 July 2015	Saint-Denis	
19		8:01.18	Bouabdellah Tahri	France	18 August 2009	Berlin	
20		8:01.61	Edmund Serem	Kenya	31 May 2026	Rabat	
21		8:01.67	Abel Mutai	Kenya	31 May 2012	Rome	
22		8:01.69	Kipkirui Misoi	Kenya	24 August 2001	Brussels	
23		8:02.36	Abrham Sime	Ethiopia	7 July 2024	Paris	
23		8:02.36	Amos Serem	Kenya	7 July 2024	Paris	
25		8:02.75	Gemechu Godana	Ethiopia	23 August 2026	Chorzów	

==== Notes ====
^{1} Until 2002 he was known as Stephen Cherono, and represented Kenya.

==== Annulled marks ====
The following athletes had their performance (inside 7:55.00) annulled due to doping offences:

- Brahim Boulami 7:53.17 (Zürich 2002)

=== Women ===
- Correct as of September 2026.

Ath.#	Perf.#	Time	Athlete	Nation	Date	Place	Ref.
1	1	8:44.32	Beatrice Chepkoech	Kenya	20 July 2018	Monaco	
2	2	8:44.39	Winfred Yavi	Bahrain	30 August 2024	Rome	
	3	8:45.25	Yavi #2		5 July 2025	Eugene	
3	4	8:48.03	Peruth Chemutai	Uganda	30 August 2024	Rome	
4	5	8:48.71	Faith Cherotich	Kenya	5 July 2025	Eugene	
	6	8:49.59	Yavi #3		19 July 2025	Heusden-Zolder	
	7	8:50.66	Yavi #4		16 September 2023	Eugene	
	8	8:51.06	Chemutai #2		23 May 2026	Xiamen	
	9	8:51.47	Chemutai #3		16 May 2026	Shaoxing	
	10	8:51.48	Cherotich #2		16 May 2026	Shaoxing	
	11	8:51.54	Yavi #5		23 May 2026	Xiamen	
	12	8:51.59	Cherotich #3		17 September 2025	Tokyo	
	13	8:51.61	Cherotich #4		4 September 2026	Brussels	
	14	8:51.67	B. Chepkoech #2		16 September 2023	Eugene	
	15	8:51.74	Cherotich #4		4 July 2026	Eugene	
	16	8:51.77	Chemutai #4		5 July 2025	Eugene	
	17	8:52.53	Cherotich #5		23 May 2026	Xiamen	
	18	8:52.76	Yavi #6		6 August 2024	Saint-Denis	
5	19	8:52.78	Ruth Jebet	Bahrain	27 August 2016	Saint-Denis	
	20	8:52.84	Yavi #7		4 July 2026	Eugene	
6	21	8:52.86	Doris Lemngole	Kenya	4 September 2026	Brussels	
7	22	8:53.02	Norah Jeruto	Kazakhstan	20 July 2022	Eugene	
	23	8:53.34	Chemutai #5		6 August 2024	Saint-Denis	
	24	8:53.54	Yavi #8		4 September 2026	Brussels	
	25	8:53.65	Jeruto #2		21 August 2021	Eugene	
8		8:54.32	Marwa Bouzayani	Tunisia	4 July 2026	Eugene	
9		8:54.61	Werkuha Getachew	Ethiopia	20 July 2022	Eugene	
10		8:56.08	Mekides Abebe	Ethiopia	20 July 2022	Eugene	
11		8:57.35	Jackline Chepkoech	Kenya	23 July 2023	London	
12		8:57.77	Courtney Frerichs	United States	21 August 2021	Eugene	
13		8:58.67	Alice Finot	France	6 August 2024	Saint-Denis	
14		8:58.78	Celliphine Chespol	Kenya	26 May 2017	Eugene	
15		8:58.81	Gulnara Galkina	Russia	17 August 2008	Beijing	
16		8:58.86	Sembo Almayew	Ethiopia	17 September 2025	Tokyo	
17		8:59.66	Kena Tufa	Ethiopia	16 May 2026	Shaoxing	
18		9:00.01	Hyvin Kiyeng	Kenya	28 May 2016	Eugene	
19		9:02.35	Emma Coburn	United States	30 September 2019	Doha	
20		9:03.22	Valerie Constien	United States	27 June 2024	Eugene	
21		9:03.30	Gesa-Felicitas Krause	Germany	30 September 2019	Doha	
22		9:04.35	Elizabeth Bird	Great Britain	6 August 2024	Saint-Denis	
23		9:04.61	Zerfe Wondemagegn	Ethiopia	2 June 2023	Florence	
24		9:05.36	Habiba Ghribi	Tunisia	11 September 2015	Brussels	
24		9:05.36	Lexy Halladay	United States	4 September 2026	Brussels	

==== Annulled marks ====
The following athletes had their performances (inside 9:05.36) annulled due to doping offences:

- Yuliya Zaripova 9:05.02 (Stockholm 2012)

== Olympic medalists ==
=== Men ===
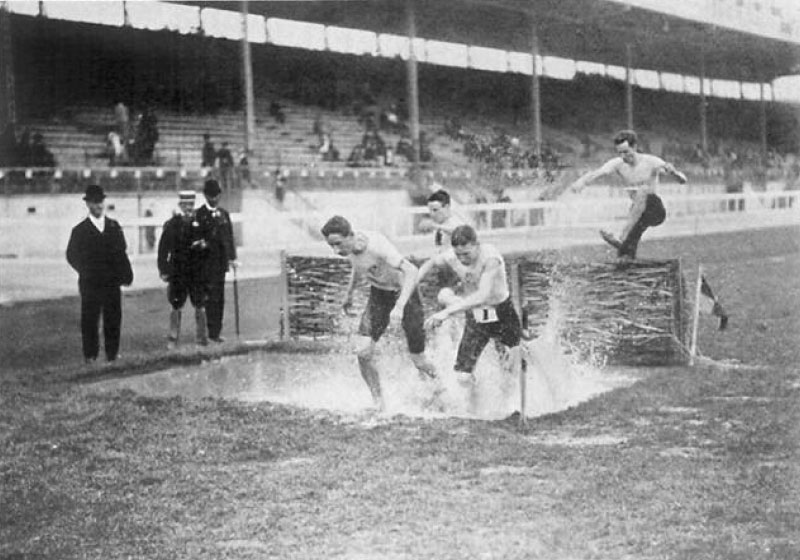
The water jump in the men's steeplechase at the 1908 Summer Olympics

Games	Gold	Silver	Bronze
1920 Antwerp	Percy Hodge; Great Britain	Patrick Flynn; United States	Ernesto Ambrosini; Italy
1924 Paris	Ville Ritola; Finland	Elias Katz; Finland	Paul Bontemps; France
1928 Amsterdam	Toivo Loukola; Finland	Paavo Nurmi; Finland	Ove Andersen; Finland
1932 Los Angeles	Volmari Iso-Hollo; Finland	Thomas Evenson; Great Britain	Joe McCluskey; United States
1936 Berlin	Volmari Iso-Hollo; Finland	Kalle Tuominen; Finland	Alfred Dompert; Germany
1948 London	Tore Sjöstrand; Sweden	Erik Elmsäter; Sweden	Göte Hagström; Sweden
1952 Helsinki	Horace Ashenfelter; United States	Vladimir Kazantsev; Soviet Union	John Disley; Great Britain
1956 Melbourne	Chris Brasher; Great Britain	Sándor Rozsnyói; Hungary	Ernst Larsen; Norway
1960 Rome	Zdzisław Krzyszkowiak; Poland	Nikolay Sokolov; Soviet Union	Semyon Rzhishchin; Soviet Union
1964 Tokyo	Gaston Roelants; Belgium	Maurice Herriott; Great Britain	Ivan Belyayev; Soviet Union
1968 Mexico City	Amos Biwott; Kenya	Benjamin Kogo; Kenya	George Young; United States
1972 Munich	Kipchoge Keino; Kenya	Ben Jipcho; Kenya	Tapio Kantanen; Finland
1976 Montreal	Anders Gärderud; Sweden	Bronisław Malinowski; Poland	Frank Baumgartl; East Germany
1980 Moscow	Bronisław Malinowski; Poland	Filbert Bayi; Tanzania	Eshetu Tura; Ethiopia
1984 Los Angeles	Julius Korir; Kenya	Joseph Mahmoud; France	Brian Diemer; United States
1988 Seoul	Julius Kariuki; Kenya	Peter Koech; Kenya	Mark Rowland; Great Britain
1992 Barcelona	Matthew Birir; Kenya	Patrick Sang; Kenya	William Mutwol; Kenya
1996 Atlanta	Joseph Keter; Kenya	Moses Kiptanui; Kenya	Alessandro Lambruschini; Italy
2000 Sydney	Reuben Kosgei; Kenya	Wilson Boit Kipketer; Kenya	Ali Ezzine; Morocco
2004 Athens	Ezekiel Kemboi; Kenya	Brimin Kipruto; Kenya	Paul Kipsiele Koech; Kenya
2008 Beijing	Brimin Kipruto; Kenya	Mahiedine Mekhissi-Benabbad; France	Richard Mateelong; Kenya
2012 London	Ezekiel Kemboi; Kenya	Mahiedine Mekhissi-Benabbad; France	Abel Mutai; Kenya
2016 Rio de Janeiro	Conseslus Kipruto; Kenya	Evan Jager; United States	Mahiedine Mekhissi-Benabbad; France
2020 Tokyo	Soufiane El Bakkali; Morocco	Lamecha Girma; Ethiopia	Benjamin Kigen; Kenya
2024 Paris	Soufiane El Bakkali; Morocco	Kenneth Rooks; United States	Abraham Kibiwot; Kenya
2028 Los Angeles			

=== Women ===
Games	Gold	Silver	Bronze
2008 Beijing^{[nb]}	Gulnara Samitova-Galkina; Russia	Eunice Jepkorir; Kenya	Tatyana Petrova; Russia
2012 London^{[nb2]}	Habiba Ghribi; Tunisia	Sofia Assefa; Ethiopia	Milcah Chemos Cheywa; Kenya
2016 Rio de Janeiro	Ruth Jebet; Bahrain	Hyvin Jepkemoi; Kenya	Emma Coburn; United States
2020 Tokyo	Peruth Chemutai; Uganda	Courtney Frerichs; United States	Hyvin Jepkemoi; Kenya
2024 Paris	Winfred Yavi; Bahrain	Peruth Chemutai; Uganda	Faith Cherotich; Kenya

- ^{nb} Yekaterina Volkova of Russia was originally the 2008 women's steeplechase bronze medalist, but she was subsequently disqualified for doping and her teammate Arkhipova was allocated the medal.
- ^{nb2} Yuliya Zaripova of Russia was originally the 2012 women's steeplechase champion, but she was subsequently disqualified for doping. Ghribi, Sofia Assefa and Chemos were all elevated one place as a result.

== World Championships medalists ==
=== Men ===
Championships	Gold	Silver	Bronze
1983 Helsinki	Patriz Ilg (FRG)	Bogusław Mamiński (POL)	Colin Reitz (GBR)
1987 Rome	Francesco Panetta (ITA)	Hagen Melzer (GDR)	William Van Dijck (BEL)
1991 Tokyo	Moses Kiptanui (KEN)	Patrick Sang (KEN)	Azzedine Brahmi (ALG)
1993 Stuttgart	Moses Kiptanui (KEN)	Patrick Sang (KEN)	Alessandro Lambruschini (ITA)
1995 Gothenburg	Moses Kiptanui (KEN)	Christopher Kosgei (KEN)	Saad Al-Asmari (KSA)
1997 Athens	Wilson Boit Kipketer (KEN)	Moses Kiptanui (KEN)	Bernard Barmasai (KEN)
1999 Seville	Christopher Kosgei (KEN)	Wilson Boit Kipketer (KEN)	Ali Ezzine (MAR)
2001 Edmonton	Reuben Kosgei (KEN)	Ali Ezzine (MAR)	Bernard Barmasai (KEN)
2003 Saint-Denis	Saif Saaeed Shaheen (QAT)	Ezekiel Kemboi (KEN)	Eliseo Martín (ESP)
2005 Helsinki	Saif Saaeed Shaheen (QAT)	Ezekiel Kemboi (KEN)	Brimin Kipruto (KEN)
2007 Osaka	Brimin Kipruto (KEN)	Ezekiel Kemboi (KEN)	Richard Mateelong (KEN)
2009 Berlin	Ezekiel Kemboi (KEN)	Richard Mateelong (KEN)	Bouabdellah Tahri (FRA)
2011 Daegu	Ezekiel Kemboi (KEN)	Brimin Kipruto (KEN)	Mahiedine Mekhissi-Benabbad (FRA)
2013 Moscow	Ezekiel Kemboi (KEN)	Conseslus Kipruto (KEN)	Mahiedine Mekhissi-Benabbad (FRA)
2015 Beijing	Ezekiel Kemboi (KEN)	Conseslus Kipruto (KEN)	Brimin Kipruto (KEN)
2017 London	Conseslus Kipruto (KEN)	Soufiane El Bakkali (MAR)	Evan Jager (USA)
2019 Doha	Conseslus Kipruto (KEN)	Lamecha Girma (ETH)	Soufiane El Bakkali (MAR)
2022 Eugene	Soufiane El Bakkali (MAR)	Lamecha Girma (ETH)	Conseslus Kipruto (KEN)
2023 Budapest	Soufiane El Bakkali (MAR)	Lamecha Girma (ETH)	Abraham Kibiwott (KEN)
2025 Tokyo	Geordie Beamish (NZL)	Soufiane El Bakkali (MAR)	Edmund Serem (KEN)

==== Medal table ====
Rank	Nation	Gold	Silver	Bronze	Total
1	Kenya (KEN)	13	12	8	33
2	Morocco (MAR)	2	3	2	7
3	Qatar (QAT)	2	0	0	2
4	Italy (ITA)	1	0	1	2
5	Germany (GER)	1	0	0	1
5	New Zealand (NZL)	1	0	0	1
7	Ethiopia (ETH)	0	3	0	3
8	East Germany (GDR)	0	1	0	1
8	Poland (POL)	0	1	0	1
10	France (FRA)	0	0	3	3
11	Algeria (ALG)	0	0	1	1
11	Belgium (BEL)	0	0	1	1
11	Great Britain (GBR)	0	0	1	1
11	Saudi Arabia (KSA)	0	0	1	1
11	Spain (ESP)	0	0	1	1
11	United States (USA)	0	0	1	1
Totals (16 entries)		20	20	20	60

=== Women ===
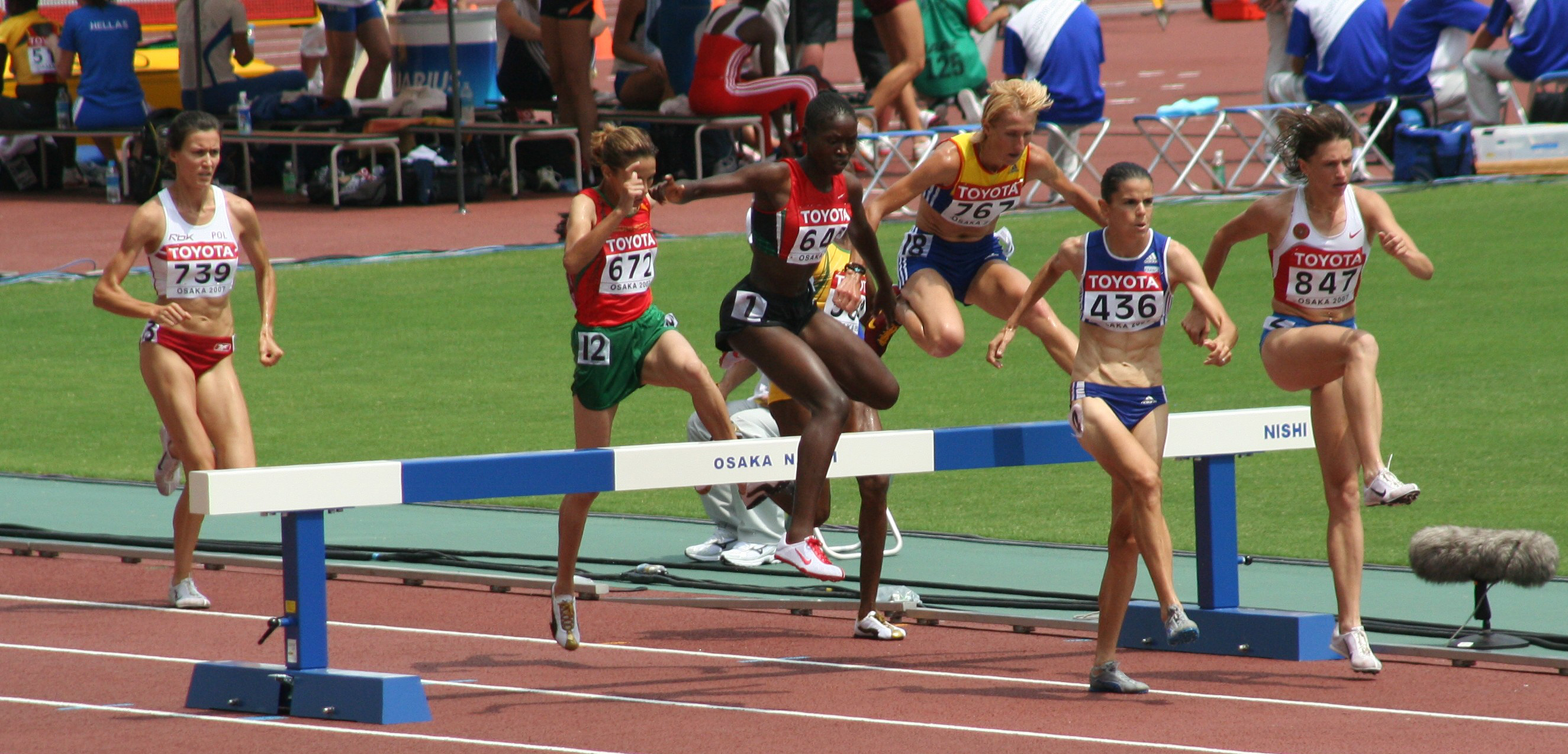
Women's race at the 2007 World Championships

Championships	Gold	Silver	Bronze
2005 Helsinki	Dorcus Inzikuru (UGA)	Yekaterina Volkova (RUS)	Jeruto Kiptum (KEN)
2007 Osaka	Yekaterina Volkova (RUS)	Tatyana Petrova (RUS)	Eunice Jepkorir (KEN)
2009 Berlin	Vacant	Yuliya Zarudneva (RUS)	Milcah Chemos Cheywa (KEN)
2011 Daegu	Habiba Ghribi (TUN)	Milcah Chemos Cheywa (KEN)	Mercy Wanjiku (KEN)
2013 Moscow	Milcah Chemos Cheywa (KEN)	Lydiah Chepkurui (KEN)	Sofia Assefa (ETH)
2015 Beijing	Hyvin Jepkemoi (KEN)	Habiba Ghribi (TUN)	Gesa Felicitas Krause (GER)
2017 London	Emma Coburn (USA)	Courtney Frerichs (USA)	Hyvin Jepkemoi (KEN)
2019 Doha	Beatrice Chepkoech (KEN)	Emma Coburn (USA)	Gesa Felicitas Krause (GER)
2022 Eugene	Norah Jeruto (KAZ)	Werkuha Getachew (ETH)	Mekides Abebe (ETH)
2023 Budapest	Winfred Yavi (BHR)	Beatrice Chepkoech (KEN)	Faith Cherotich (KEN)
2025 Tokyo	Faith Cherotich (KEN)	Winfred Yavi (BHR)	Sembo Almayew (ETH)

== World leading times ==
=== Men ===
Year	Time	Athlete	Place
1968	8:24.2 h	Jouko Kuha (FIN)	Stockholm
1969	8:22.2 h	Vladimiras Dudinas (URS)	Kyiv
1970	8:21.98	Kerry O'Brien (AUS)	Berlin
1971	8:24.0 h	Kerry O'Brien (AUS)	Adelaide
1972	8:20.8 h	Anders Gärderud (SWE)	Helsinki
1973	8:13.91	Ben Jipcho (KEN)	Helsinki
1974	8:14.2 h	Anders Gärderud (SWE)	Helsinki
1975	8:09.70	Anders Gärderud (SWE)	Stockholm
1976	8:08.02	Anders Gärderud (SWE)	Montréal
1977	8:14.05	Michael Karst (FRG)	Stockholm
1978	8:05.4 h	Henry Rono (KEN)	Seattle
1979	8:17.92	Henry Rono (KEN)	Champaign
1980	8:09.70	Bronisław Malinowski (POL)	Moscow
1981	8:12.32	Mariano Scartezzini (ITA)	Zagreb
1982	8:16.17	Henry Marsh (USA)	Koblenz
1983	8:12.37	Henry Marsh (USA)	Berlin
1984	8:07.62	Joseph Mahmoud (FRA)	Brussels
1985	8:09.17	Henry Marsh (USA)	Koblenz
1986	8:10.01	William Van Dijck (BEL)	Brussels
1987	8:08.57	Francesco Panetta (ITA)	Rome
1988	8:05.51	Julius Kariuki (KEN)	Seoul
1989	8:05.35	Peter Koech (KEN)	Stockholm
1990	8:10.95	Peter Koech (KEN)	Hengelo
1991	8:06.46	Moses Kiptanui (KEN)	Brussels
1992	8:02.08	Moses Kiptanui (KEN)	Zürich
1993	8:06.36	Moses Kiptanui (KEN)	Stuttgart
1994	8:08.80	Moses Kiptanui (KEN)	Zürich
1995	7:59.18	Moses Kiptanui (KEN)	Zürich
1996	8:05.68	John Kosgei (KEN)	Milan
1997	7:55.72	Bernard Barmasai (KEN)	Cologne
1998	8:00.67	Bernard Barmasai (KEN)	Monaco
1999	7:58.98	Bernard Barmasai (KEN)	Monaco
2000	8:02.76	Bernard Barmasai (KEN)	Monaco
2001	7:55.28	Brahim Boulami (MAR)	Brussels
2002	7:58.09	Brahim Boulami (MAR)	Monaco
2003	7:57.38	Saif Saeed Shaheen (QAT)	Monaco
2004	7:53.63	Saif Saeed Shaheen (QAT)	Brussels
2005	7:55.51	Saif Saeed Shaheen (QAT)	Brussels
2006	7:56.32	Saif Saeed Shaheen (QAT)	Athens
2007	7:58.80	Paul Kipsiele Koech (KEN)	Brussels
2008	8:00.57	Paul Kipsiele Koech (KEN)	Heusden-Zolder
2009	7:58.85	Ezekiel Kemboi (KEN)	Doha
2010	8:00.90	Brimin Kipruto (KEN)	Brussels
2011	7:53.64	Brimin Kipruto (KEN)	Monaco
2012	7:54.31	Paul Kipsiele Koech (KEN)	Rome
2013	7:59.03	Ezekiel Kemboi (KEN)	Saint-Denis
2014	7:58.41	Jairus Birech (KEN)	Brussels
2015	7:58.83	Jairus Birech (KEN)	Saint-Denis
2016	8:00.12	Conseslus Kipruto (KEN)	Birmingham
2017	8:01.29	Evan Jager (USA)	Monaco
2018	7:58.15	Soufiane El Bakkali (MAR)	Monaco
2019	8:01.35	Conseslus Kipruto (KEN)	Doha
2020	8:08.04	Soufiane El Bakkali (MAR)	Monaco
2021	8:07.12	Benjamin Kigen (KEN)	Paris
2022	7:58.28	Soufiane El Bakkali (MAR)	Rabat
2023	7:52.11	Lamecha Girma (ETH)	Paris
2024	8:01.63	Lamecha Girma (ETH)	Stockholm
2025	8:00.70	Soufiane El Bakkali (MAR)	Rabat
2026	7:57.25	Soufiane El Bakkali (MAR)	Rabat

=== Women ===
Year	Time	Athlete	Place
1996	10:23.47	Courtney Meldrum (USA)	Atlanta
1997	10:30.90	Melissa Teemant (USA)	Indianapolis
1998	9:55.28	Daniela Petrescu (ROU)	Bucharest
1999	9:48.88	Yelena Motalova (RUS)	Tula
2000	9:48.88	Cristina Casandra (ROU)	Reims
2001	9:44.36	Justyna Bak (POL)	Poznań
2002	9:16.51	Alesya Turova (BLR)	Gdańsk
2003	9:08.33	Gulnara Samitova (RUS)	Tula
2004	9:01.59	Gulnara Samitova (RUS)	Iraklio
2005	9:15.04	Dorcus Inzikuru (UGA)	Athens
2006	9:17.15	Wioletta Janowska (POL)	Athens
2007	9:06.57	Yekaterina Volkova (RUS)	Osaka
2008	8:58.81	Gulnara Samitova-Galkina (RUS)	Beijing
2009	9:12.50	Jennifer Simpson (USA)	Berlin
2010	9:11.71	Milcah Chemos (KEN)	Rome
2011	9:07.03	Yuliya Zaripova (RUS)	Daegu
2012	9:05.02	Yuliya Zaripova (RUS)	Stockholm
2013	9:11.65	Milcah Chemos Cheywa (KEN)	Moscow
2014	9:10.64	Hiwot Ayalew (ETH)	Glasgow
2015	9:05.36	Habiba Ghribi (TUN)	Brussels
2016	8:52.78	Ruth Jebet (BHR)	Saint-Denis
2017	8:55.29	Ruth Jebet (BHR)	Zürich
2018	8:44.32	Beatrice Chepkoech (KEN)	Monaco
2019	8:55.58	Beatrice Chepkoech (KEN)	Palo Alto
2020	9:06.14	Hyvin Kiyeng (KEN)	Berlin
2021	9:00.67	Norah Jeruto (KEN)	Doha
2022	8:53.02	Norah Jeruto (KAZ)	Eugene
2023	8:50.66	Winfred Yavi (BHR)	Eugene
2024	8:44.39	Winfred Yavi (BHR)	Rome
2025	8:45.25	Winfred Yavi (BHR)	Eugene
2026	8:51.06	Peruth Chemutai (UGA)	Xiamen

== See also ==
- National records in the 3000 metres steeplechase
- 2000 metres steeplechase
