= Azzedine Brahmi =

Algerian long-distance runner

Medal record

Men's athletics

Representing Algeria

World Championships
Bronze medal – third place	1991 Tokyo	3000 m st.

African Championships
Gold medal – first place	1988 Annaba	3000 m st.
Gold medal – first place	1989 Lagos	3000 m st.

Azzedine Brahmi (Arabic: عزالدين ابراهيمي) (born September 13, 1966, in Sétif) is an Algerian long-distance runner who competed mostly over 3000 metres steeplechase. He won a bronze medal at the 1991 World Championships. His best Olympic performances came in 1988 and 1992, when he finished eighth. He also competed at the 1988 Summer Olympics and the 1992 Summer Olympics.

== Achievements ==
- 1993 Mediterranean Games - Silver
- 1992 Summer Olympics - eighth place
- 1991 Mediterranean Games - Gold
- 1991 World Championships in Athletics - Bronze
- 1990 Maghreb Championships - Gold
- 1989 African Championships - Gold
- 1988 Summer Olympics - eighth place
- 1988 African Championships - Gold
- 1986 Maghreb Championships - Silver
