= Matthew Birir =

Kenyan athlete

Medal record

Men's Athletics

Representing Kenya

Olympic Games
Gold medal – first place	1992 Barcelona	3000 m steeplechase

World Junior Championships
Gold medal – first place	1990 Plovdiv	3000 m steeplechase
Silver medal – second place	1988 Sudbury	3000m steeplechase

Matthew Kiprotich Birir (born 5 July 1972) is a former athlete from Kenya and a winner of the 3000 m steeplechase at the 1992 Summer Olympics.

== Biography ==
Born in Eldama Ravine, Matthew Birir started running, when he attended the famous St. Patrick's High School in Iten, which has produced many great Kenyan runners.

== Career ==
At the Barcelona Olympics, the main favourite was Patrick Sang. At the Olympic final, it was soon clear, that all the medals are going to Kenya. At the last lap, the 20-year-old Birir outsprinted his older countryman Sang to win a gold 0.69 seconds ahead of latter.

At the 1993 World Championships Birir was fourth, behind Italian Alessandro Lambruschini, who repeated this feat three years later at the 1996 Summer Olympics, where Birir had to settle again for fourth place.
