= Athletics at the 1992 Summer Olympics =

Athletics at the Games of the XXV Olympiad
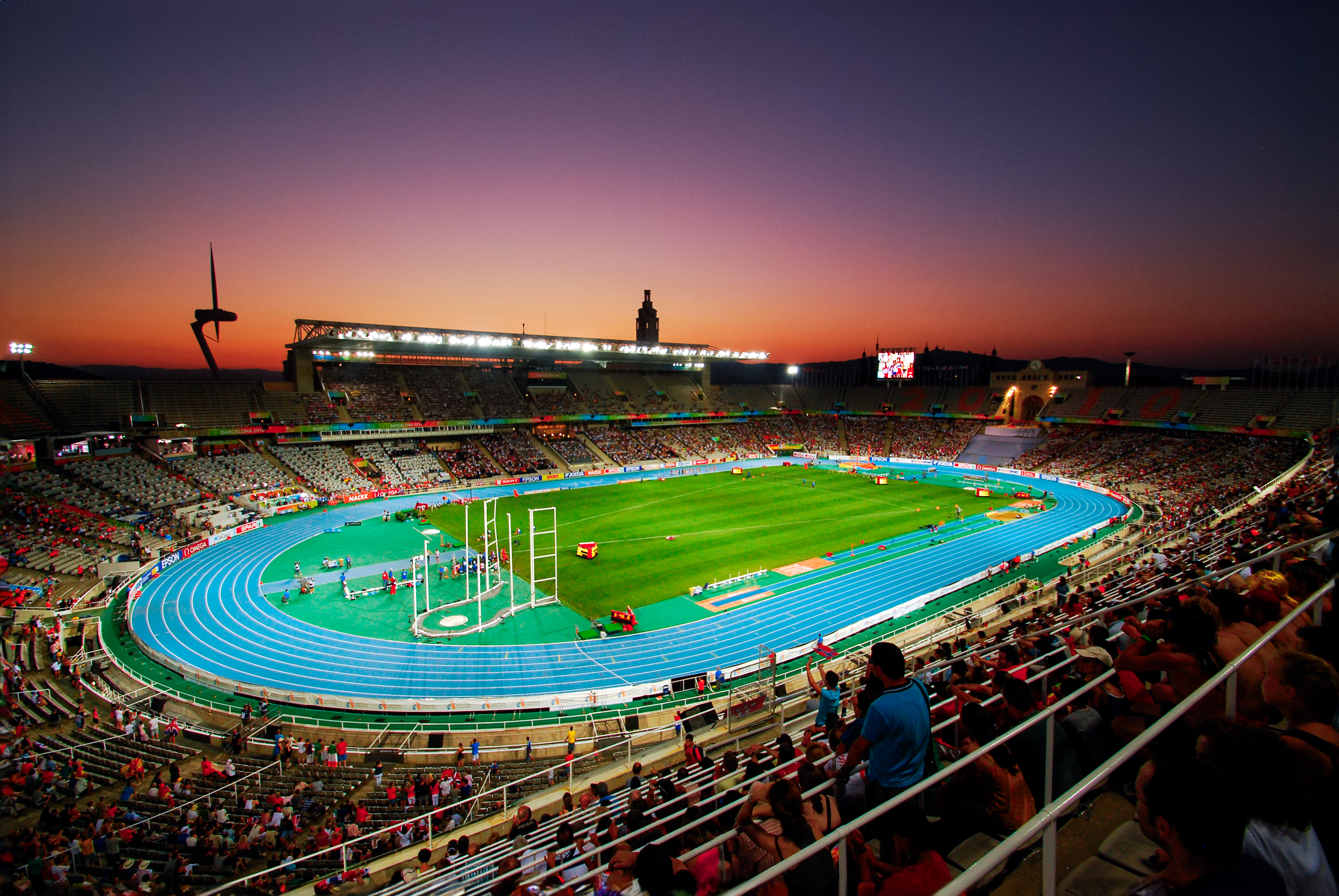
- Host stadium (shown in 2010)
- Venue: Estadi Olímpic de Montjuïc
- Dates: July 31 August 9, 1992
- No. of events: 43
- Competitors: 1725 from 156 nations

At the 1992 Summer Olympics in Barcelona, 43 events in athletics were contested, 24 events by men and 19 by women. The competition ran from July 31, 1992, to August 9, 1992. Fourteen world record-holders (eight men and six women) were among the contenders. Thirty former Olympic champions competed, and a total number of 1725 athletes from 156 countries.

== Medal summary ==
=== Men ===
| Games | Gold | | Silver | | Bronze | |
|---|---|---|---|---|---|---|
| 100 metres | Linford Christie; Great Britain | 9.96 | Frankie Fredericks; Namibia | 10.02 | Dennis Mitchell; United States | 10.04 |
| 200 metres | Michael Marsh; United States | 20.01 | Frankie Fredericks; Namibia | 20.13 | Michael Bates; United States | 20.38 |
| 400 metres | Quincy Watts; United States | 43.50 (OR) | Steve Lewis; United States | 44.21 | Samson Kitur; Kenya | 44.24 |
| 800 metres | William Tanui; Kenya | 1:43.66 | Nixon Kiprotich; Kenya | 1:43.70 | Johnny Gray; United States | 1:43.97 |
| 1500 metres | Fermín Cacho; Spain | 3:40.12 | Rachid El Basir; Morocco | 3:40.62 | Mohamed Suleiman; Qatar | 3:40.69 |
| 5000 metres | Dieter Baumann; Germany | 13:12.52 | Paul Bitok; Kenya | 13:12.71 | Fita Bayisa; Ethiopia | 13:13.03 |
| 10,000 metres | Khalid Skah; Morocco | 27:46.70 | Richard Chelimo; Kenya | 27:47.72 | Addis Abebe; Ethiopia | 28:00.07 |
| 110 metres hurdles | Mark McKoy; Canada | 13.12 | Tony Dees; United States | 13.24 | Jack Pierce; United States | 13.26 |
| 400 metres hurdles | Kevin Young; United States | 46.78 (WR) | Winthrop Graham; Jamaica | 47.66 | Kriss Akabusi; Great Britain | 47.82 |
| 3000 metres steeplechase | Matthew Birir; Kenya | 8:08.84 | Patrick Sang; Kenya | 8:09.55 | William Mutwol; Kenya | 8:10.74 |
| 4 × 100 metres relay | United States; Michael Marsh; Leroy Burrell; Dennis Mitchell; Carl Lewis; James Jett* | 37.40 (WR) | Nigeria; Oluyemi Kayode; Chidi Imoh; Olapade Adeniken; Davidson Ezinwa; Osmond Ezinwa* | 37.98 | Cuba; Andrés Simón; Joel Lamela; Joel Isasi; Jorge Aguilera | 38.00 |
| 4 × 400 metres relay | United States; Andrew Valmon; Quincy Watts; Michael Johnson; Steve Lewis; Darnell Hall*; Charles Jenkins* | 2:55.74 (WR) | Cuba; Lázaro Martínez; Héctor Herrera; Norberto Téllez; Roberto Hernández | 2:59.51 | Great Britain; Roger Black; David Grindley; Kriss Akabusi; John Regis; Du'aine Ladejo*; Mark Richardson* | 2:59.73 |
| Marathon | Hwang Young-cho; South Korea | 2:13:23 | Kōichi Morishita; Japan | 2:13:45 | Stephan Freigang; Germany | 2:14:00 |
| 20 kilometres walk | Daniel Plaza; Spain | 1:21.25 | Guillaume LeBlanc; Canada | 1:22.25 | Giovanni De Benedictis; Italy | 1:23.11 |
| 50 kilometres walk | Andrey Perlov; Unified Team (Russia) | 3:50.13 | Carlos Mercenario; Mexico | 3:52.09 | Ronald Weigel; Germany | 3:53.45 |
| High jump | Javier Sotomayor; Cuba | 2.34 m | Patrik Sjöberg; Sweden | 2.34 m | Hollis Conway; United States | 2.34 m |
| High jump | Javier Sotomayor; Cuba | 2.34 m | Patrik Sjöberg; Sweden | 2.34 m | Tim Forsyth; Australia | 2.34 m |
| High jump | Javier Sotomayor; Cuba | 2.34 m | Patrik Sjöberg; Sweden | 2.34 m | Artur Partyka; Poland | 2.34 m |
| Pole vault | Maksim Tarasov; Unified Team (Russia) | 5.80 m | Igor Trandenkov; Unified Team (Russia) | 5.80 m | Javier García; Spain | 5.75 m |
| Long jump | Carl Lewis; United States | 8.67 m | Mike Powell; United States | 8.64 m | Joe Greene; United States | 8.34 m |
| Triple jump | Mike Conley; United States | 18.17 m w | Charles Simpkins; United States | 17.60 m | Frank Rutherford; Bahamas | 17.36 m |
| Shot put | Mike Stulce; United States | 21.70 m | Jim Doehring; United States | 20.96 m | Vyacheslav Lykho; Unified Team (Russia) | 20.94 m |
| Discus throw | Romas Ubartas; Lithuania | 65.12 m | Jürgen Schult; Germany | 64.94 m | Roberto Moya; Cuba | 64.12 m |
| Hammer throw | Andrey Abduvaliyev; Unified Team (Tajikistan) | 82.54 m | Igor Astapkovich; Unified Team (Belarus) | 81.96 m | Igor Nikulin; Unified Team (Russia) | 81.38 m |
| Javelin throw | Jan Železný; Czechoslovakia | 89.66 m | Seppo Räty; Finland | 86.60 m | Steve Backley; Great Britain | 83.38 m |
| Decathlon | Robert Změlík; Czechoslovakia | 8611 | Antonio Peñalver; Spain | 8412 | Dave Johnson; United States | 8309 |

* Athletes who participated in the heats only and received medals.

=== Women ===
| Games | Gold | | Silver | | Bronze | |
|---|---|---|---|---|---|---|
| 100 metres | Gail Devers; United States | 10.82 | Juliet Cuthbert; Jamaica | 10.83 | Irina Privalova; Unified Team (Russia) | 10.84 |
| 200 metres | Gwen Torrence; United States | 21.81 | Juliet Cuthbert; Jamaica | 22.02 | Merlene Ottey; Jamaica | 22.09 |
| 400 metres | Marie-José Pérec; France | 48.83 | Olha Bryzhina; Unified Team (Ukraine) | 49.05 | Ximena Restrepo; Colombia | 49.64 |
| 800 metres | Ellen van Langen; Netherlands | 1:55.54 | Liliya Nurutdinova; Unified Team (Russia) | 1:55.99 | Ana Fidelia Quirot; Cuba | 1:56.80 |
| 1500 metres | Hassiba Boulmerka; Algeria | 3:55.30 | Lyudmila Rogachova; Unified Team (Russia) | 3:56.91 | Qu Yunxia; China | 3:57.08 |
| 3000 metres | Yelena Romanova; Unified Team (Russia) | 8:46.04 | Tetyana Dorovskikh; Unified Team (Ukraine) | 8:46.85 | Angela Chalmers; Canada | 8:47.22 |
| 10,000 metres | Derartu Tulu; Ethiopia | 31:06.02 | Elana Meyer; South Africa | 31:11.75 | Lynn Jennings; United States | 31:19.89 |
| 100 metres hurdles | Voula Patoulidou; Greece | 12.64 | LaVonna Martin; United States | 12.69 | Yordanka Donkova; Bulgaria | 12.70 |
| 400 metres hurdles | Sally Gunnell; Great Britain | 53.23 | Sandra Farmer-Patrick; United States | 53.69 | Janeene Vickers; United States | 54.31 |
| 4 × 100 metres relay | United States; Evelyn Ashford; Esther Jones; Carlette Guidry; Gwen Torrence; Michelle Finn* | 42.11 | Unified Team; Olga Bogoslovskaya; Galina Malchugina; Marina Trandenkova; Irina Privalova | 42.16 | Nigeria; Beatrice Utondu; Faith Idehen; Christy Opara-Thompson; Mary Onyali | 42.81 |
| 4 × 400 metres relay | Unified Team; Yelena Ruzina; Lyudmyla Dzhyhalova; Olga Nazarova; Olha Bryzhina; Liliya Nurutdinova*; Marina Shmonina* | 3:20.20 | United States; Natasha Kaiser; Gwen Torrence; Jearl Miles; Rochelle Stevens; Denean Hill*; Dannette Young* | 3:20.92 | Great Britain; Phylis Smith; Sandra Douglas; Jennifer Stoute; Sally Gunnell | 3:24.23 |
| Marathon | Valentina Yegorova; Unified Team (Russia) | 2:32:41 | Yuko Arimori; Japan | 2:32:49 | Lorraine Moller; New Zealand | 2:33:59 |
| 10 kilometres walk | Chen Yueling; China | 44:32 | Yelena Nikolayeva; Unified Team (Russia) | 44:33 | Li Chunxiu; China | 44:41 |
| High jump | Heike Henkel; Germany | 2.02 m | Galina Astafei; Romania | 2.00 m | Ioamnet Quintero; Cuba | 1.97 m |
| Long jump | Heike Drechsler; Germany | 7.14 m | Inessa Kravets; Unified Team (Ukraine) | 7.12 m | Jackie Joyner-Kersee; United States | 7.07 m |
| Shot put | Svetlana Krivelyova; Unified Team (Russia) | 21.06 m | Huang Zhihong; China | 20.47 m | Kathrin Neimke; Germany | 19.78 m |
| Discus throw | Maritza Martén; Cuba | 70.06 m | Tsvetanka Khristova; Bulgaria | 67.78 m | Daniela Costian; Australia | 66.24 m |
| Javelin throw | Silke Renk; Germany | 68.34 m | Natalya Shikolenko; Unified Team (Belarus) | 68.26 m | Karen Forkel; Germany | 66.86 m |
| Heptathlon | Jackie Joyner-Kersee; United States | 7044 | Irina Belova; Unified Team (Russia) | 6845 | Sabine Braun; Germany | 6649 |

* Athletes who participated in the heats only and received medals.

== Medal table ==
* Host nation (Spain)

| Rank | Nation | Gold | Silver | Bronze | Total |
|---|---|---|---|---|---|
| 1 | United States | 12 | 8 | 10 | 30 |
| 2 | Unified Team | 7 | 11 | 3 | 21 |
| 3 | Germany | 4 | 1 | 5 | 10 |
| 4 | Kenya | 2 | 4 | 2 | 8 |
| 5 | Cuba | 2 | 1 | 4 | 7 |
| 6 | Spain* | 2 | 1 | 1 | 4 |
| 7 | Great Britain | 2 | 0 | 4 | 6 |
| 8 | Czechoslovakia | 2 | 0 | 0 | 2 |
| 9 | China | 1 | 1 | 2 | 4 |
| 10 | Canada | 1 | 1 | 1 | 3 |
| 11 | Morocco | 1 | 1 | 0 | 2 |
| 12 | Ethiopia | 1 | 0 | 2 | 3 |
| 13 | Algeria | 1 | 0 | 0 | 1 |
| 13 | France | 1 | 0 | 0 | 1 |
| 13 | Greece | 1 | 0 | 0 | 1 |
| 13 | Lithuania | 1 | 0 | 0 | 1 |
| 13 | Netherlands | 1 | 0 | 0 | 1 |
| 13 | South Korea | 1 | 0 | 0 | 1 |
| 19 | Jamaica | 0 | 3 | 1 | 4 |
| 20 | Japan | 0 | 2 | 0 | 2 |
| 20 | Namibia | 0 | 2 | 0 | 2 |
| 22 | Bulgaria | 0 | 1 | 1 | 2 |
| 22 | Nigeria | 0 | 1 | 1 | 2 |
| 24 | Finland | 0 | 1 | 0 | 1 |
| 24 | Mexico | 0 | 1 | 0 | 1 |
| 24 | Romania | 0 | 1 | 0 | 1 |
| 24 | South Africa | 0 | 1 | 0 | 1 |
| 24 | Sweden | 0 | 1 | 0 | 1 |
| 29 | Australia | 0 | 0 | 2 | 2 |
| 30 | Bahamas | 0 | 0 | 1 | 1 |
| 30 | Colombia | 0 | 0 | 1 | 1 |
| 30 | Italy | 0 | 0 | 1 | 1 |
| 30 | New Zealand | 0 | 0 | 1 | 1 |
| 30 | Poland | 0 | 0 | 1 | 1 |
| 30 | Qatar | 0 | 0 | 1 | 1 |
| Totals (35 entries) | | 43 | 43 | 45 | 131 |

== Participating nations ==
A total of 156 nations participated in the different Athletics events at the 1992 Summer Olympics.

- Albania (1 athlete)
- Algeria (9)
- Andorra (1)
- Angola (5)
- Antigua and Barbuda (5)
- Argentina (4)
- Aruba (2)
- Australia (35)
- Austria (16)
- Bahamas (8)
- Bahrain (6)
- Bangladesh (4)
- Barbados (8)
- Belgium (7)
- Belize (5)
- Benin (4)
- Bermuda (4)
- Bolivia (6)
- Bosnia and Herzegovina (4)
- Botswana (5)
- Brazil (24)
- British Virgin Islands (1)
- Bulgaria (21)
- Burkina Faso (3)
- Cameroon (7)
- Canada (48)
- Cayman Islands (1)
- Central African Republic (8)
- Chad (4)
- Chile (3)
- China (33)
- Chinese Taipei (2)
- Colombia (5)
- Republic of the Congo (6)
- Cook Islands (1)
- Costa Rica (8)
- Ivory Coast (9)
- Croatia (2)
- Cuba (34)
- Cyprus (5)
- Czechoslovakia (18)
- Denmark (3)
- Djibouti (5)
- Ecuador (7)
- El Salvador (2)
- Equatorial Guinea (7)
- Estonia (5)
- Ethiopia (15)
- Fiji (7)
- Finland (26)
- France (57)
- Gabon (2)
- The Gambia (5)
- Germany (79)
- Ghana (8)
- Great Britain (91)
- Greece (11)
- Grenada (4)
- Guam (2)
- Guinea (5)
- Guyana (3)
- Haiti (2)
- Honduras (4)
- Hong Kong (3)
- Hungary (24)
- Iceland (4)
- Independent Olympic Participants (9)
- India (2)
- Iran (2)
- Ireland (19)
- Israel (4)
- Italy (39)
- Jamaica (28)
- Japan (31)
- Jordan (2)
- Kenya (38)
- Kuwait (4)
- Laos (5)
- Latvia (7)
- Lebanon (1)
- Lesotho (6)
- Libya (1)
- Liechtenstein (2)
- Lithuania (8)
- Madagascar (5)
- Malaysia (1)
- Malawi (4)
- Maldives (5)
- Mali (3)
- Malta (2)
- Mauritania (6)
- Mauritius (3)
- Mexico (24)
- Mongolia (1)
- Morocco (13)
- Mozambique (3)
- Myanmar (3)
- Namibia (3)
- Nepal (1)
- Netherlands (15)
- Netherlands Antilles (1)
- New Zealand (13)
- Nicaragua (1)
- Niger (3)
- Nigeria (14)
- North Korea (3)
- Norway (9)
- Oman (4)
- Pakistan (4)
- Panama (1)
- Papua New Guinea (6)
- Paraguay (3)
- Peru (2)
- Philippines (3)
- Poland (24)
- Portugal (36)
- Puerto Rico (7)
- Qatar (11)
- Romania (25)
- Rwanda (7)
- Saint Vincent and the Grenadines (6)
- San Marino (5)
- Saudi Arabia (2)
- Senegal (9)
- Seychelles (4)
- Sierra Leone (11)
- Slovenia (4)
- South Africa (16)
- South Korea (11)
- Spain (59)
- Sri Lanka (7)
- Sudan (3)
- Suriname (2)
- Swaziland (5)
- Sweden (19)
- Switzerland (15)
- Syria (3)
- Tanzania (4)
- Thailand (18)
- Togo (4)
- Tonga (4)
- Trinidad and Tobago (5)
- Tunisia (1)
- Turkey (2)
- Uganda (4)
- Unified Team (99)
- United Arab Emirates (4)
- United States (117)
- Uruguay (2)
- Vanuatu (6)
- Vietnam (4)
- Virgin Islands (10)
- Yemen (3)
- Zaire (7)
- Zambia (4)
- Zimbabwe (7)

== See also ==
- 1992 in athletics (track and field)
