= Athletics at the 1996 Summer Olympics – Men's 3000 metres steeplechase =

Men's 3000 metres steeplechase at the Games of the XXVI Olympiad
- Venue: Centennial Olympic Stadium
- Dates: 29 July 1996 (heats); 31 July 1996 (semi-finals); 2 August 1996 (final)
- Competitors: 35 from 22 nations
- Winning time: 8:07.12

Medalists
1st place, gold medalist(s)		Joseph Keter; Kenya
2nd place, silver medalist(s)		Moses Kiptanui; Kenya
3rd place, bronze medalist(s)		Alessandro Lambruschini; Italy

These are the official results of the Men's 3000 metres Steeplechase event at the 1996 Summer Olympics in Atlanta, Georgia. There were a total number of 35 participating athletes, with two semi-finals and three qualifying heats.

Perhaps after watching the slow start four years earlier, this time Kenyans wanted less drama than their casual sweep of 1992. From the gun, Joseph Keter took the lead. Moses Kiptanui got a poorer start but simply ran around the outside of the pack and joined Keter from barely 150 metres into the race and that was it. The two never relinquished the lead. Defending champion Matthew Birir made it a touch more dramatic by being last off the line and took all of an additional 50 metres to join the pack at the front. The closest trailing athletes were the two Italians Angelo Carosi and Alessandro Lambruschini and Moroccan Brahim Boulami. With three laps to go, Alessandro Lambruschini passed Boulami and Carosi to become the only one to challenge the 10 metre lead the Kenyans had built. Little by little over the next lap, Lambruschini was able to bridge the gap, with Mark Croghan running hard from a few places back to get up to fifth. With two laps to go, Birir started to lose contact with his teammates. Lambruschini passed him and set off in chase of the other two. With just over a lap to go, Keter looked over his shoulder to see who was behind him, it wasn't Birir, all three accelerated. With Kiptanui leading Keter and Lambruschini, the group left Birir and the rest of the field behind. Just before the water jump Keter went wide as both Kenyans hurdled the water. Lambruschini lost a few meters and Keter was sprinting around Kiptanui. Both men sprinted to the final barrier, with Keter taking it first and fastest. He pulled away to victory. 10 metres later Lambruschini crossed the line with a bronze medal reward for improving over finishing fourth the previous two Olympics. 25 metres back, Birir held off the rest of the field.

== Medalists ==
Gold	Joseph Keter; Kenya
Silver	Moses Kiptanui; Kenya
Bronze	Alessandro Lambruschini; Italy

== Records ==
These were the standing world and Olympic records (in minutes) prior to the 1996 Summer Olympics.

World record	7:59.18	(Kenya) Moses Kiptanui	Zürich (SUI)	August 16, 1995
Olympic record	8:05.51	(Kenya) Julius Kariuki	Seoul (KOR)	September 30, 1988

== Final ==
Rank	Final	Time
	Joseph Keter (KEN)	8:07.12
	Moses Kiptanui (KEN)	8:08.33
	Alessandro Lambruschini (ITA)	8:11.28
4.	Matthew Birir (KEN)	8:17.18
5.	Mark Croghan (USA)	8:17.84
6.	Steffen Brand (GER)	8:18.52
7.	Brahim Boulami (MAR)	8:23.13
8.	Jim Svenøy (NOR)	8:23.39
9.	Angelo Carosi (ITA)	8:29.67
10.	Martin Strege (GER)	8:30.31
11.	Hicham Bouaouiche (MAR)	8:46.22
12.	Marc Davis (USA)	9:51.96

== Semifinals ==
Rank	Heat 1	Time
1.	Marc Davis (USA)	8:26.76
2.	Matthew Birir (KEN)	8:27.16
3.	Alessandro Lambruschini (ITA)	8:27.32
4.	Hicham Bouaouiche (MAR)	8:27.76
5.	Martin Strege (GER)	8:27.99
6.	Florin Ionescu (ROU)	8:28.77
7.	Joël Bourgeois (CAN)	8:31.45
8.	Abdelaziz Sahere (MAR)	8:33.90
9.	Vladimir Golyas (RUS)	8:36.85
10.	Godfrey Siamusiye (ZAM)	8:37.41
11.	Keith Cullen (GBR)	8:46.74
12.	Kim Bauermeister (GER)	8:51.83

Rank	Heat 2	Time
1.	Joseph Keter (KEN)	8:18.90
2.	Moses Kiptanui (KEN)	8:18.91
3.	Steffen Brand (GER)	8:19.11
4.	Jim Svenøy (NOR)	8:19.79
5.	Brahim Boulami (MAR)	8:20.43
6.	Mark Croghan (USA)	8:21.01
7.	Angelo Carosi (ITA)	8:21.86
8.	Chris Unthank (AUS)	8:25.59
9.	Justin Chaston (GBR)	8:28.50
10.	Vladimir Pronin (RUS)	8:34.79
11.	Jamal Hassan (QAT)	8:36.40
12.	Nadir Bosch (FRA)	8:47.31

== Heats ==
Rank	Heat 1	Time
1.	Joseph Keter (KEN)	8:30.23
2.	Godfrey Siamusiye (ZAM)	8:30.56
3.	Florin Ionescu (ROU)	8:31.34
4.	Alessandro Lambruschini (ITA)	8:31.69
5.	Hicham Bouaouiche (MAR)	8:31.97
6.	Martin Strege (GER)	8:32.76
7.	Jamal Abdi Hassan (QAT)	8:36.99
8.	Eduardo Henriques (POR)	8:38.58
9.	Elisardo de la Torre (ESP)	8:42.75
10.	Spencer Duval (GBR)	8:46.76
11.	Robert Gary (USA)	8:49.68
—	Primo Higa (SOL)	DNF

Rank	Heat 2	Time
1.	Abdelaziz Sahere (MAR)	8:26.79
2.	Matthew Birir (KEN)	8:27.09
3.	Mark Croghan (USA)	8:27.91
4.	Joël Bourgeois (CAN)	8:28.14
5.	Justin Chaston (GBR)	8:28.32
6.	Vladimir Pronin (RUS)	8:29.49
7.	Nadir Bosch (FRA)	8:31.65
8.	Kim Bauermeister (GER)	8:36.86
9.	Ricardo Vera (URU)	8:40.78
10.	Néstor Nieves (VEN)	8:47.34
11.	Vítor Almeida (POR)	8:48.16
12.	Clodoaldo do Carmo (BRA)	8:51.78

Rank	Heat 3	Time
1.	Angelo Carosi (ITA)	8:30.83
2.	Moses Kiptanui (KEN)	8:30.87
3.	Brahim Boulami (MAR)	8:30.97
4.	Steffen Brand (GER)	8:31.18
5.	Marc Davis (USA)	8:31.25
6.	Keith Cullen (GBR)	8:31.26
7.	Jim Svenøy (NOR)	8:31.30
8.	Chris Unthank (AUS)	8:31.86
9.	Vladimir Golyas (RUS)	8:35.50
10.	Shadrack Mogotsi (RSA)	8:46.24
11.	Ibrahim Al-Asiri Yahya (KSA)	8:46.37

== See also ==
- 1995 Men's World Championships 3000 m steeplechase
- 1997 Men's World Championships 3000 m steeplechase
