= 1995 World Championships in Athletics – Men's 3000 metres steeplechase =

A men's 3000 metres steeplechase event was held at the 1995 World Championships in Athletics in Gothenburg, Sweden. There were a total number of 36 participating athletes, with three qualifying heats, two semi-finals and the final held on Friday 11 August 1995.

== Final ==
Rank	Final	Time
1st place, gold medalist(s)	Moses Kiptanui (KEN)	8:04.16
2nd place, silver medalist(s)	Christopher Koskei (KEN)	8:09.30
3rd place, bronze medalist(s)	Saad Al-Asmari (KSA)	8:12.95
4.	Steffen Brand (GER)	8:14.37
5.	Angelo Carosi (ITA)	8:14.85
6.	Florin Ionescu (ROM)	8:15.44
7.	Vladimir Pronin (RUS)	8:16.59
8.	Martin Strege (GER)	8:18.57
9.	Matthew Birir (KEN)	8:21.15
10.	Alessandro Lambruschini (ITA)	8:22.64
11.	Vladimir Golyas (RUS)	8:27.59
12.	Javier Rodríguez (ESP)	8:30.96

== Semi-finals ==
- Held on Wednesday 1995-08-09

Rank	HEAT 1	Time
1.	Angelo Carosi (ITA)	8:19.73
2.	Matthew Birir (KEN)	8:20.17
3.	Christopher Koskei (KEN)	8:20.53
4.	Florin Ionescu (ROM)	8:20.76
5.	Javier Rodríguez (ESP)	8:20.89
6.	Vladimir Golyas (RUS)	8:20.97
7.	Martin Strege (GER)	8:22.33
8.	Elarbi Khattabi (MAR)	8:24.13
9.	Graeme Fell (CAN)	8:24.74
10.	Karl Van Calcar (USA)	8:30.32
11.	Brahim Boulami (MAR)	8:35.42
12.	Jim Svenøy (NOR)	8:40.53

Rank	HEAT 2	Time
1.	Saad Al-Asmari (KSA)	8:25.19
2.	Steffen Brand (GER)	8:26.35
3.	Vladimir Pronin (RUS)	8:26.70
4.	Moses Kiptanui (KEN)	8:27.26
5.	Alessandro Lambruschini (ITA)	8:27.75
6.	Michał Bartoszak (POL)	8:29.14
7.	Ville Hautala (FIN)	8:31.37
8.	Justin Chaston (GBR)	8:38.90
9.	Kim Bauermeister (GER)	8:45.27
10.	Shadrack Mogotsi (RSA)	8:54.27
—	Mark Croghan (USA)	DNF
—	Abdelaziz Sahere (MAR)	DNF

== Qualifying heats ==
- Held on Monday 1995-08-07

Rank	HEAT 1	Time
1.	Matthew Birir (KEN)	8:24.34
2.	Abdelaziz Sahere (MAR)	8:24.37
3.	Javier Rodríguez (ESP)	8:24.66
4.	Shadrack Mogotsi (RSA)	8:25.61
5.	Steffen Brand (GER)	8:26.45
6.	Karl Van Calcar (USA)	8:26.97
7.	Michał Bartoszak (POL)	8:27.25
8.	Ville Hautala (FIN)	8:29.06
9.	Marcel Laros (NED)	8:31.10
10.	Mohamed Belabbes (ALG)	8:33.13
11.	Spencer Duval (GBR)	8:38.01
12.	Wander Moura (BRA)	8:43.37

Rank	HEAT 2	Time
1.	Saad Al-Asmari (KSA)	8:22.01
2.	Christopher Koskei (KEN)	8:22.27
3.	Mark Croghan (USA)	8:26.02
4.	Vladimir Pronin (RUS)	8:27.79
5.	Kim Bauermeister (GER)	8:29.05
6.	Alessandro Lambruschini (ITA)	8:29.36
7.	Brahim Boulami (MAR)	8:30.93
8.	Keith Cullen (GBR)	8:32.07
9.	Antonios Vouzis (GRE)	8:34.44
10.	Godfrey Siamusiye (ZAM)	8:37.41
11.	Vítor Almeida (POR)	8:45.20
12.	Zeba Crook (CAN)	8:50.34

Rank	HEAT 3	Time
1.	Florin Ionescu (ROM)	8:22.86
2.	Angelo Carosi (ITA)	8:23.93
3.	Elarbi Khattabi (MAR)	8:24.11
4.	Martin Strege (GER)	8:24.18
5.	Moses Kiptanui (KEN)	8:24.20
6.	Jim Svenøy (NOR)	8:24.49
7.	Graeme Fell (CAN)	8:24.85
8.	Justin Chaston (GBR)	8:24.97
9.	Vladimir Golyas (RUS)	8:27.50
10.	Ricardo Vera (URU)	8:33.95
11.	Ruben García (MEX)	8:36.28
12.	Thomas Nohilly (USA)	8:37.01
