= 1998 European Athletics Championships – Men's 3000 metres steeplechase =

Men's 3000 metres steeplechase at the European Athletics Championships

The men's 3000 metres steeplechase at the 1998 European Athletics Championships was held at the Népstadion on 20 and 23 August.

== Medalists ==
Gold	Damian Kallabis; Germany
Silver	Alessandro Lambruschini; Italy
Bronze	Jim Svenøy; Norway

== Results ==
KEY:	q	Fastest non-qualifiers	Q	Qualified	NR	National record	PB	Personal best	SB	Seasonal best

=== Round 1 ===
Qualification: First 4 in each heat (Q) and the next 4 fastest (q) advance to the Final.

Rank	Heat	Name	Nationality	Time	Notes
1	1	Luciano Di Pardo	Italy	8:26.52	Q
2	1	Mark Ostendarp	Germany	8:26.92	Q
3	1	Jim Svenøy	Norway	8:26.92	Q
4	1	Alessandro Lambruschini	Italy	8:27.05	Q, SB
5	2	Luis Martín	Spain	8:27.31	Q
6	1	Eliseo Martín	Spain	8:27.35	q
7	2	Ramiro Morán	Spain	8:27.46	Q, SB
8	2	Damian Kallabis	Germany	8:27.54	Q
9	2	Rafał Wójcik	Poland	8:27.79	Q
10	2	André Green	Germany	8:27.98	q
11	2	Bouabdellah Tahri	France	8:28.30	q
12	2	Angelo Carosi	Italy	8:28.77	q
13	1	Georgios Giannelis	Greece	8:28.81	PB
14	1	Vincent Le Dauphin	France	8:29.08	
15	2	Michael Buchleitner	Austria	8:31.54	
16	1	João Junqueira	Portugal	8:32.02	
17	2	Mohamed Belabbes	France	8:33.64	
18	2	Vítor Almeida	Portugal	8:35.05	
19	1	Marcel Laros	Netherlands	8:38.89	
20	1	Jan Zakrzewski	Poland	8:40.94	
21	2	Panagiotis Papoulias	Greece	8:45.01	
22	1	Michał Bartoszak	Poland	8:45.70	
23	2	Yaroslav Mushinskiy	Moldova	8:47.27	
24	1	Konstantin Tomskiy	Russia	8:49.53	
25	2	Ville-Veikko Sainio	Finland	8:52.23	
26	2	Stathis Stasi	Cyprus	8:52.65	SB
	1	Günther Weidlinger	Austria	DNF	

=== Final ===
Rank	Name	Nationality	Time	Notes
1st place, gold medalist(s)	Damian Kallabis	Germany	8:13.10	PB
2nd place, silver medalist(s)	Alessandro Lambruschini	Italy	8:16.70	SB
3rd place, bronze medalist(s)	Jim Svenøy	Norway	8:18.97	
4	Luis Martín	Spain	8:20.54	PB
5	Luciano Di Pardo	Italy	8:20.96	
6	Ramiro Morán	Spain	8:24.06	PB
7	Eliseo Martín	Spain	8:26.60	
8	Rafał Wójcik	Poland	8:27.74	
9	Mark Ostendarp	Germany	8:31.72	
10	Bouabdellah Tahri	France	8:41.45	
11	André Green	Germany	9:03.17	
12	Angelo Carosi	Italy	DNF	
