= Athletics at the 1997 Summer Universiade – Men's 3000 metres steeplechase =

The men's 3000 metres steeplechase event at the 1997 Summer Universiade was held at the Stadio Cibali in Catania, Italy on 31 August.

== Results ==
Rank	Athlete	Nationality	Time	Notes
1st place, gold medalist(s)	Mark Ostendarp	Germany	8:25.83	
2nd place, silver medalist(s)	Marcel Laros	Netherlands	8:27.91	
3rd place, bronze medalist(s)	Michael Buchleitner	Austria	8:28.92	
4	Vladimir Pronin	Russia	8:31.35	
5	Konstantin Tomskiy	Russia	8:32.42	
6	Daniel Njenga	Kenya	8:32.70	
7	Sammy Nyamongo	Kenya	8:32.97	
8	Giuseppe Maffei	Italy	8:34.98	
9	John Mortimer	United States	8:35.83	
10	Simon Vroemen	Netherlands	8:36.89	
11	Adam Dobrzyński	Poland	8:37.01	
12	Serhiy Redko	Ukraine	8:37.55	
13	Hamid Ibrahim Sadjadi	Iran	8:37.75	
14	Joël Bourgeois	Canada	8:37.78	
15	Elisardo de la Torre	Spain	8:43.48	
16	Stéphane Desaulty	France	8:47.39	
17	Janko Podgoršek	Slovenia	8:51.52	
18	Cândido Maya	Portugal	8:52.54	
19	Alberto Genovés	Spain	8:54.96	
20	Mārtiņš Alksnis	Latvia	8:59.09	
21	Iaroslav Mușinschi	Moldova	9:06.48	
	Steffen Brandis	Germany	DNF	
	Øyvind Fretheim	Norway	DNF	
	Jan Erik Christiansen	Norway	DNF	
	Brady Bonsall	United States	DNF	
