= 1994 European Athletics Championships – Men's 3000 metres steeplechase =

Men's 3000 metres steeplechase at the European Athletics Championships

The men's 3000 metres steeplechase event at the 1994 European Athletics Championships was held in Helsinki, Finland, at Helsinki Olympic Stadium on 9 and 12 August 1994.

== Medalists ==
Gold	Alessandro Lambruschini; Italy
Silver	Angelo Carosi; Italy
Bronze	William Van Dijck; Belgium

== Results ==
=== Final ===
12 August

Rank	Name	Nationality	Time	Notes
1st place, gold medalist(s)	Alessandro Lambruschini	Italy	8:22.40	
2nd place, silver medalist(s)	Angelo Carosi	Italy	8:23.53	
3rd place, bronze medalist(s)	William Van Dijck	Belgium	8:24.86	
4	Mark Rowland	United Kingdom	8:26.00	
5	Vladimir Pronin	Russia	8:26.33	PB
6	Martin Strege	Germany	8:26.36	
7	Jim Svenøy	Norway	8:28.12	PB
8	Francesco Panetta	Italy	8:28.25	
9	Kim Bauermeister	Germany	8:32.58	
10	Tom Hanlon	United Kingdom	8:36.06	
11	Justin Chaston	United Kingdom	8:36.83	
12	Markus Hacksteiner	Switzerland	8:46.60	

=== Heats ===
9 August

==== Heat 1 ====
Rank	Name	Nationality	Time	Notes
1	Angelo Carosi	Italy	8:29.81	Q
2	Kim Bauermeister	Germany	8:29.90	Q
3	Mark Rowland	United Kingdom	8:30.24	Q
4	William Van Dijck	Belgium	8:30.93	Q
5	Tom Hanlon	United Kingdom	8:31.50	q
6	Michael Buchleitner	Austria	8:33.90	
7	Ville Hautala	Finland	8:35.87	
8	Elisardo de la Torre	Spain	8:38.16	
9	Vítor Almeida	Portugal	8:47.49	
	Jon Azkueta	Spain	DNF	

==== Heat 2 ====
Rank	Name	Nationality	Time	Notes
1	Alessandro Lambruschini	Italy	8:28.68	Q
2	Martin Strege	Germany	8:28.92	Q
3	Vladimir Pronin	Russia	8:29.35	Q
4	Markus Hacksteiner	Switzerland	8:29.82	Q
5	Jim Svenøy	Norway	8:30.14	q
6	Francesco Panetta	Italy	8:30.78	q
7	Justin Chaston	United Kingdom	8:31.08	q
8	Vasiliy Omelyusik	Belarus	8:33.92	
9	Kåre Sørensen	Denmark	8:35.20	
10	Marcel Laros	Netherlands	8:37.83	
11	Antonio Peula	Spain	8:44.21	

== Participation ==
According to an unofficial count, 21 athletes from 14 countries participated in the event.

- Austria (1)
- Belarus (1)
- Belgium (1)
- Denmark (1)
- Finland (1)
- Germany (2)
- Italy (3)
- Netherlands (1)
- Norway (1)
- Portugal (1)
- Russia (1)
- Spain (3)
- Switzerland (1)
- United Kingdom (3)
