= Athletics at the 1993 Summer Universiade – Men's 3000 metres steeplechase =

The men's 3000 metres steeplechase event at the 1993 Summer Universiade was held at the UB Stadium in Buffalo, United States with the final on 17 July 1993.

== Medalists ==
Gold	Silver	Bronze
Michael Buchleitner; Austria	Vladimir Pronin; Russia	Bizuneh Yae Tura; Ethiopia

== Results ==
=== Heats ===
Rank	Heat	Athlete	Nationality	Time	Notes
1	1	Francis O'Neill	United States	8:39.62	Q
2	2	Bizuneh Yae Tura	Ethiopia	8:42.38	Q
3	1	Vladimir Pronin	Russia	8:43.17	Q
4	2	Joël Bourgeois	Canada	8:44.13	Q
5	2	Vítor Almeida	Portugal	8:44.50	Q
6	1	Inocencio López	Spain	8:44.61	Q
7	1	Zeba Crook	Canada	8:44.64	Q
8	2	Michael Buchleitner	Austria	8:45.48	Q
9	1	Spencer Duval	Great Britain	8:45.73	Q
10	1	Michael Heist	Germany	8:46.04	q
11	2	Christian Stang	Germany	8:46.89	Q
12	2	Kurt Black	United States	8:47.79	q
13	2	Elisardo de la Torre	Spain	8:48.87	
14	2	David Lee	Great Britain	8:49.21	
15	2	Dmitriy Drozdov	Russia	8:56.52	
61	1	Miloš Kováčech	Slovakia	9:05.65	
17	1	Phil Costley	New Zealand	9:12.28	

=== Final ===
Rank	Athlete	Nationality	Time	Notes
1st place, gold medalist(s)	Michael Buchleitner	Austria	8:30.82	
2nd place, silver medalist(s)	Vladimir Pronin	Russia	8:32.03	
3rd place, bronze medalist(s)	Bizuneh Yae Tura	Ethiopia	8:32.07	
4	Francis O'Neill	United States	8:32.63	
5	Joël Bourgeois	Canada	8:33.96	
6	Spencer Duval	Great Britain	8:35.39	
7	Inocencio López	Spain	8:35.44	
8	Christian Stang	Germany	8:38.38	
9	Vítor Almeida	Portugal	8:40.60	
10	Zeba Crook	Canada	8:56.81	
11	Michael Heist	Germany	8:58.92	
	Kurt Black	United States	DNF	
