= 1997 World Championships in Athletics – Men's 3000 metres steeplechase =

These are the results of the Men's 3000 metres steeplechase event at the 1997 World Championships in Athletics held in Athens, Greece on 3, 4 and 6 August.

== Medalists ==
Gold	Wilson Boit Kipketer; Kenya (KEN)
Silver	Moses Kiptanui; Kenya (KEN)
Bronze	Bernard Barmasai; Kenya (KEN)

== Results ==
=== Heats ===
First 6 of each heat (Q) and the next 6 fastest (q) qualified for the semifinals.

Rank	Heat	Name	Nationality	Time	Notes
1	1	Rafał Wójcik	Poland	8:24.93	Q, PB
2	1	Brahim Boulami	Morocco	8:24.95	Q
3	2	Saad Shaddad Al-Asmari	Saudi Arabia	8:25.23	Q
4	1	Moses Kiptanui	Kenya	8:25.80	Q
5	1	Vladimir Pronin	Russia	8:25.95	Q, SB
6	1	Mark Croghan	United States	8:25.95	Q
7	2	Mark Ostendarp	Germany	8:25.97	Q
8	1	Alessandro Lambruschini	Italy	8:26.35	Q, SB
9	2	Bernard Barmasai	Kenya	8:26.62	Q
10	1	Michael Buchleitner	Austria	8:26.76	q
11	1	Florin Ionescu	Romania	8:27.39	q
12	1	Robert Hough	Great Britain	8:28.54	q, SB
13	1	Stathis Stasi	Cyprus	8:28.85	q
14	2	Simon Vroemen	Netherlands	8:28.96	Q
15	3	Wilson Boit Kipketer	Kenya	8:29.40	Q
16	3	Jim Svenøy	Norway	8:29.65	Q
17	3	Hicham Bouaouiche	Morocco	8:29.67	Q
18	3	Angelo Carosi	Italy	8:29.92	Q
19	3	Ramiro Morán	Spain	8:29.98	Q
20	3	Marcel Laros	Netherlands	8:30.24	Q
21	3	Wander Moura	Brazil	8:30.70	Q
22	3	Adam Dobrzyński	Poland	8:31.69	q
23	1	Christopher Unthank	Australia	8:32.03	
24	2	Elarbi Khattabi	Morocco	8:32.53	Q
25	2	Tom Nohilly	United States	8:32.70	Q
26	2	Million Wolde	Ethiopia	8:32.77	
27	2	Abderrahmane Daas	Algeria	8:33.35	
28	3	Antonios Vouzis	Greece	8:33.51	
29	3	Stephane Desaulty	France	8:33.56	
30	2	Giuseppe Maffei	Italy	8:37.12	
31	2	Vítor Almeida	Portugal	8:40.75	
32	2	Michał Bartoszak	Poland	8:47.01	
33	2	Hector Begeo	Philippines	9:17.82	

=== Semifinals ===
First 5 of each heat (Q) and the next 4 fastest (q) qualified for the final.

Rank	Heat	Name	Nationality	Time	Notes
1	2	Bernard Barmasai	Kenya	8:17.95	Q
2	2	Wilson Boit Kipketer	Kenya	8:18.92	Q
3	2	Mark Croghan	United States	8:19.98	Q
4	1	Saad Shaddad Al-Asmari	Saudi Arabia	8:20.18	Q
5	1	Mark Ostendarp	Germany	8:20.40	Q, PB
6	1	Moses Kiptanui	Kenya	8:20.76	Q
7	2	Angelo Carosi	Italy	8:20.82	Q
8	1	Hicham Bouaouiche	Morocco	8:20.88	Q
9	1	Elarbi Khattabi	Morocco	8:20.94	Q, SB
10	1	Jim Svenøy	Norway	8:21.16	q
11	2	Brahim Boulami	Morocco	8:21.99	Q
12	2	Florin Ionescu	Romania	8:22.35	q, SB
13	2	Michael Buchleitner	Austria	8:26.22	
14	1	Vladimir Pronin	Russia	8:29.39	
15	1	Ramiro Morán	Spain	8:31.73	
16	1	Rafał Wójcik	Poland	8:33.28	
17	2	Wander Moura	Brazil	8:35.01	
18	2	Stathis Stasi	Cyprus	8:35.73	
19	2	Marcel Laros	Netherlands	8:36.12	
20	2	Adam Dobrzyński	Poland	8:38.58	
21	1	Simon Vroemen	Netherlands	8:48.66	
22	2	Robert Hough	Great Britain	8:59.24	
	1	Tom Nohilly	United States	DNF	
	1	Alessandro Lambruschini	Italy	DNF	

=== Final ===
Rank	Name	Nationality	Time	Notes
1st place, gold medalist(s)	Wilson Boit Kipketer	Kenya	8:05.84	
2nd place, silver medalist(s)	Moses Kiptanui	Kenya	8:06.04	
3rd place, bronze medalist(s)	Bernard Barmasai	Kenya	8:06.04	
4	Saad Shaddad Al-Asmari	Saudi Arabia	8:13.87	
5	Hicham Bouaouiche	Morocco	8:14.04	
6	Mark Croghan	United States	8:14.09	
7	Jim Svenøy	Norway	8:14.80	NR
8	Angelo Carosi	Italy	8:16.01	SB
9	Mark Ostendarp	Germany	8:18.49	PB
10	Brahim Boulami	Morocco	8:23.34	
11	Elarbi Khattabi	Morocco	8:29.43	
12	Florin Ionescu	Romania	8:39.67	
