= Athletics at the 1995 Summer Universiade – Men's 3000 metres steeplechase =

Athletics

The men's 3000 metres steeplechase event at the 1995 Summer Universiade was held on 2 September at the Hakatanomori Athletic Stadium in Fukuoka, Japan.

== Results ==
Rank	Athlete	Nationality	Time	Notes
1st place, gold medalist(s)	Daniel Njenga Muturi	Kenya	8:27.03	
2nd place, silver medalist(s)	Joël Bourgeois	Canada	8:28.44	
3rd place, bronze medalist(s)	Brahim Boulami	Morocco	8:35.53	
4	Marcel Laros	Netherlands	8:36.25	
5	Justin Chaston	Great Britain	8:39.28	
6	Sumito Ogino	Japan	8:41.70	
7	Vítor Almeida	Portugal	8:43.37	
8	Giuseppe Maffei	Italy	8:44.98	
9	Sdjad-Hazave Hamid	Iran	8:45.14	
10	Samuel Wilbur	United States	8:46.81	
11	Scott Strand	United States	8:47.60	
12	Phil Costley	New Zealand	8:49.06	
13	Elisardo de la Torre	Spain	8:49.23	
14	Yasunori Uchitomi	Japan	8:50.84	
15	Simon Vroemen	Netherlands	8:54.48	
16	Chris Unthank	Australia	8:59.31	
17	Matthew Holder	New Zealand	9:04.79	
18	Henry Klassen	Canada	9:08.61	
19	Cocou Gbaglo	Benin	10:33.37	
	Vladimir Golias	Russia	DNF	
	Robert Hough	Great Britain	DNF	
