= Athletics New Brunswick =

Canadian provincial sports governing body

Athletics New Brunswick / Athlétisme Nouveau-Brunswick
- Sport: Athletics
- Jurisdiction: Athletics in New Brunswick
- Abbreviation: ANB
- Founded: 1991
- Headquarters: Fredericton, New Brunswick
- President: Dave Thomas
- Vice president: Jamie Wolverton
- Director: Samantha Stewart
- Secretary: Christy Cunningham
- Sponsor: Sport Canada
- Replaced: The New Brunswick Track and Field Association

Official website
- www.anb.ca
- (New Brunswick)

Athletics New Brunswick (in French Athlétisme Nouveau-Brunswick) is the provincial organizing body for track and field, cross country running, race walking, and road racing in New Brunswick. The organization is the official branch of Athletics Canada and was incorporated in 1991 to replace the former organization, The New Brunswick Track and Field Association. The organization offers programs to affiliated and non-affiliated participants annually, reaching some 3000 athletes, coaches, officials, and volunteers across the province.

== History ==
Athletics New Brunswick was incorporated in 1991 as a branch of Athletics Canada to promote and govern the sport of athletics in the province and to replace the former organization, The New Brunswick Track and Field Association (the former member of Athletics Canada and the Canadian Track and Field Association).

The organization has attracted international attention in recent years, with the hosting of the 2010 World Junior Championships in Athletics in Moncton, and the 2012 North, Central American and Caribbean Masters Athletics in Saint John. Moncton's Hub City Classic has attracted international athletes in the past, and been a stop on Athletics Canada's National Track League (2011 and 2012) and National Track & Field Tour (2023).

=== Presidents ===
Term start	Term end	Name
1984	1987	LeRoy Washburn
1987	1989	Walter Ellis
1989	2004	Harold Nicholson
2004	2007	Dennis Furlong
2007	2011	Harold Nicholson
2011	2015	Bill MacMackin
2015	2022	Marc Lalonde
2022	2024	Andrée Savoie
2024	Present	Dave Thomas

== Notable athletes ==
Current and former notable athletes from the province include:

- William Best - 800m Canadian champion, competitor at the 1989 Jeux de la Francophonie at the age of 18, and a personal best of 1:46.52.
- Joël Bourgeois - 3000m steeplechase runner, gold medalist at the 1999 Pan American Games, silver medalist at the 2003 Pan American Games, and competitor in the 1996 Summer Olympics and 2000 Summer Olympics.
- Barry Britt - Silver medalist at the 2011 Canadian cross country championships, standout at the University of Idaho with personal bests of 4:07.33, 8:07.02, and 14:03.48 in the one mile, 3,000m, and 5,000m respectively.
- Ryan Cassidy - Multiple Canadian champion in the steeplechase event, competitor at the 2010 and 2012 IAAF World Junior Championships in Athletics. Became the first ever Canadian cross country champion from New Brunswick with his win in the junior race in 2011.
- Rejean Chiasson - Marathon runner, New Brunswick marathon record by over 10 minutes (2:17:47) and 2012 Canadian marathon champion.
- Diane (Matheson) Clement - Bronze medalist at the 1958 Commonwealth Games, former Athletics Canada president, and co-founder of the Vancouver Sun Run. In 2011 she was named to the Athletics Canada Hall of Fame.
- Giovanni Corazza - Javelin thrower, competed in the 1978 Commonwealth Games, qualified for the 1980 Summer Olympics but didn't compete due to the Canadian boycott.
- Shayne Dobson - T37 Paralympic athlete, Canadian T37 record holder in the 800m and 1500m and dual medalist at the 2011 Parapan American Games in the 800m (bronze) and 1500 (silver).
- Adam Gaudes - Competitor for Canada at the 2009 World Youth Championships in Athletics in the 400m, and the 2010 World Junior Championships in Athletics on the 4 × 400 m relay team.
- Caleb Jones - Javelin Thrower, competitor for Canada at the 2010 World Junior Championships in Athletics.
- Geneviève Lalonde - Multiple Canadian champion in distance races and the steeplechase event, competitor at the 2010 World Junior Championships in Athletics, 2011 Summer Universiade, and 2012 NACAC Under-23 Championships in Athletics. 2011 Canadian Interuniversity Sport (CIS) Cross Country Champion, gold medalist with a games record, and Canadian record, performance at the 2013 Canada Summer Games, and bronze medalist at the 2013 Jeux de la Francophonie. With her bronze medal performance in the steeplechase event at the 2013 Jeux de la Francophonie, Lalonde became the first ever female New Brunswick medalist in athletics.
- Lindsay Laltoo - Competitor for Canada at the 2002 IAAF World Cross Country Championships. First Canadian in the junior women's race
- Michael LeBlanc - Competitor for Canada at the 2012 IAAF World Indoor Championships.
- William Maynes - Fourth place in the 4 × 400 m relay at the 1924 Summer Olympics.
- Hal Merrill - Paralympic thrower, dual bronze medalist at the 1992 Summer Paralympics in the shot put and javelin, and bronze medalist at the 1996 Summer Paralympics in the shot put. Member of the New Brunswick Sports Hall of Fame.
- Andrew "Zan" "Jack" Miller - Competitor in the high jump event at the 1924 Summer Olympics.
- Sigurd Nielsen - 100 yard sprinter in the 1938 British Empire Games.
- Mike Sokolowski - Competitor in the 4 × 400 m relay event at the 1984 Summer Olympics.
- Craig Thorne - Competitor in the 110 metres hurdles event at the 2024 Summer Olympics.

== See also ==
- Sports in Canada
- Athletics Canada
- Other Provincial Organizations Governing Athletics
