= 1990 World Junior Championships in Athletics – Men's 20 kilometres road run =

The men's 20 kilometres road run event at the 1990 World Junior Championships in Athletics was held in Plovdiv, Bulgaria, on 12 August 1990.

== Medalists ==
Gold	Cosmas Ndeti; Kenya
Silver	Juma Ninga; Tanzania
Bronze	Dagne Debela; Ethiopia

== Results ==
=== Final ===
12 August

Rank	Name	Nationality	Time	Notes
1st place, gold medalist(s)	Cosmas Ndeti	Kenya	59:42	
2nd place, silver medalist(s)	Juma Ninga	Tanzania	1:00:30	
3rd place, bronze medalist(s)	Dagne Debela	Ethiopia	1:01:02	
4	Bedaso Turbe	Ethiopia	1:02:52	
5	Giacomo Leone	Italy	1:03:01	
6	Robinson Semolini	Brazil	1:03:09	
7	Meta Petro	Tanzania	1:03:37	
8	Kamal Kohil	Algeria	1:03:42	
9	Sergey Bondarenko	Soviet Union	1:03:49	
10	Muchapiwa Mazano	Zimbabwe	1:04:10	
11	Samir M'tougui	Morocco	1:04:25	
12	Tesuya Kumagai	Japan	1:04:29	
13	Brandon Rhodes	United States	1:04:54	
14	Uwe Michel	East Germany	1:05:10	
15	Panayiótis Charamis	Greece	1:05:28	
16	Richard Ngetich	Kenya	1:05:53	
17	Javier Caballero	Spain	1:06:02	
18	Elisaldo León	Cuba	1:06:19	
19	Yahia Azaidj	Algeria	1:06:35	
20	Paul Patrick	Australia	1:06:43	
21	Keith Gorby	United States	1:07:32	
22	Walter Marcone	Italy	1:07:57	
23	Elisardo de la Torre	Spain	1:08:00	
24	Andrew Mackenzie	New Zealand	1:08:26	
25	Chris Unthank	Australia	1:10:02	
26	John Murray	Ireland	1:11:45	
27	Curri Genc	Albania	1:12:27	
	Petko Stefanov	Bulgaria	DNF	

== Participation ==
According to an unofficial count, 28 athletes from 20 countries participated in the event.

- Albania (1)
- Algeria (2)
- Australia (2)
- Brazil (1)
- Bulgaria (1)
- Cuba (1)
- East Germany (1)
- Ethiopia (2)
- Greece (1)
- Ireland (1)
- Italy (2)
- Japan (1)
- Kenya (2)
- Morocco (1)
- New Zealand (1)
- Soviet Union (1)
- Spain (2)
- Tanzania (2)
- United States (2)
- Zimbabwe (1)
