= 1990 World Junior Championships in Athletics – Men's 3000 metres steeplechase =

The men's 3000 metres steeplechase event at the 1990 World Junior Championships in Athletics was held in Plovdiv, Bulgaria, at Deveti Septemvri Stadium on 10 and 12 August.

== Medalists ==
Gold	Matthew Birir; Kenya
Silver	Francisco Munuera; Spain
Bronze	Simeon Rono; Kenya

== Results ==
=== Final ===
12 August

Rank	Name	Nationality	Time	Notes
1st place, gold medalist(s)	Matthew Birir	Kenya	8:31.02	
2nd place, silver medalist(s)	Francisco Munuera	Spain	8:41.03	
3rd place, bronze medalist(s)	Simeon Rono	Kenya	8:42.05	
4	Alastair O'Connor	United Kingdom	8:44.68	
5	Vladimir Golyas	Soviet Union	8:49.68	
6	Joël Bourgeois	Canada	8:51.80	
7	Seiji Kushibe	Japan	8:53.86	
8	Yuriy Churakov	Soviet Union	8:55.07	
9	Yeóryios Yianélis	Greece	8:55.80	
10	Florin Ionescu	Romania	9:04.30	
11	Marcel Laros	Netherlands	9:08.43	
12	Rainer Huth	West Germany	9:15.85	

=== Heats ===
10 August

==== Heat 1 ====
Rank	Name	Nationality	Time	Notes
1	Francisco Munuera	Spain	8:48.75	Q
2	Marcel Laros	Netherlands	8:52.21	Q
3	Seiji Kushibe	Japan	8:53.09	Q
4	Joël Bourgeois	Canada	8:53.41	Q
5	Yuriy Churakov	Soviet Union	8:53.86	q
6	Alastair O'Connor	United Kingdom	8:54.73	q
7	Darren Abbott	Australia	8:58.69	
8	Alvaro Ramalhete	Portugal	9:05.42	
9	Emil Cheresharski	Bulgaria	9:06.23	
10	Jim Svenøy	Norway	9:07.46	
11	Nurettin Özyürek	Turkey	9:10.51	
12	John Murray	Ireland	9:25.28	
13	John Moritz	United States	9:27.91	
	Holger Ross	West Germany	DNF	

==== Heat 2 ====
Rank	Name	Nationality	Time	Notes
1	Matthew Birir	Kenya	8:45.32	Q
2	Simeon Rono	Kenya	8:50.57	Q
3	Yeóryios Yianélis	Greece	8:52.15	Q
4	Florin Ionescu	Romania	8:52.58	Q
5	Vladimir Golyas	Soviet Union	8:53.95	q
6	Rainer Huth	West Germany	8:56.99	q
7	Georgios Loucaides	Cyprus	8:59.90	
8	Masafumi Matsuoka	Japan	9:00.03	
9	Keith Cullen	United Kingdom	9:08.39	
10	Héctor Arias	Mexico	9:09.76	
11	František Zálešák	Czechoslovakia	9:19.79	
12	Julio Figueirêdo	Portugal	9:34.44	

== Participation ==
According to an unofficial count, 26 athletes from 20 countries participated in the event.

- Australia (1)
- Bulgaria (1)
- Canada (1)
- Cyprus (1)
- Czechoslovakia (1)
- Greece (1)
- Ireland (1)
- Japan (2)
- Kenya (2)
- Mexico (1)
- Netherlands (1)
- Norway (1)
- Portugal (2)
- Romania (1)
- Soviet Union (2)
- Spain (1)
- Turkey (1)
- United Kingdom (2)
- United States (1)
- West Germany (2)
