= André Green (athlete) =

German steeplechase runner

André Green (born 21 April 1973 in Schleswig) is a retired German runner who specialized in the 3000 metres steeplechase.

He finished ninth at the 1992 World Junior Championships and eleventh at the 1998 European Championships. The latter race was won by countryfellow Damian Kallabis, and Mark Ostendarp came in ninth.

In 1998 his personal best time was 8:20.51 minutes. He became German steeplechase champion in 1999, representing the team LG Wedel/Pinneberg.
