= Jean-Nicolas Duval =

Canadian runner (born 1974)

Personal information
- Born: September 16, 1974 (age 51)

Sport
- Sport: Athletics
- Event: Running
Medal record
Representing Canada
Pan American Games
Bronze medal – third place	1999 Winnipeg	3000 m steeplechase
Representing Quebec
Jeux de la Francophonie
Silver medal – second place	1997 Antananarivo	3000 m steeplechase

Jean-Nicolas Duval (born September 16, 1974) is a Canadian former athlete who competed in the middle and long-distance running events.

A Quebec native, Duval was a McGill University varsity athlete.

Duval won the 5,000 m, 10,000 m and 3,000 m steeplechase at the Canada Games in 1997. He was the steeplechase silver medalist at the 1997 Jeux de la Francophonie. In 1999, Duval claimed a Pan American Games bronze medal in steeplechase, won by his countryman Joël Bourgeois.
