= Carlos Suárez =

Carlos Suárez may refer to:

- Carlos Suárez (cinematographer) (1946–2019), Spanish cinematographer
- Carlos Suárez (basketball) (born 1986), Spanish professional basketball player
- Carlos Suárez (footballer) (born 1992), Venezuelan football player
- Carlos Suárez (boxer) (born 1993), American-Trinidadian boxer
- Carlos Suárez (runner) (born 1975), Spanish steeplechaser, 9th in athletics at the 1999 Summer Universiade – Men's 3000 metres steeplechase
