= Athletics at the 1994 Commonwealth Games – Men's 3000 metres steeplechase =

Men's 3000 metres steeplechase at the Commonwealth Games

The men's 3000 metres steeplechase event at the 1994 Commonwealth Games was held on 23 August in Victoria, British Columbia

== Results ==
Rank	Name	Nationality	Time	Notes
1st place, gold medalist(s)	Johnstone Kipkoech	Kenya	8:14:72	GR
2nd place, silver medalist(s)	Gideon Chirchir	Kenya	8:15.25	
3rd place, bronze medalist(s)	Graeme Fell	Canada	8:23.28	
4	Colin Walker	England	8:27.78	
5	Thomas Buckner	England	8:29.84	
6	Joël Bourgeois	Canada	8:31.19	
7	Justin Chaston	Wales	8:32.20	
8	Paul Chemase	Kenya	8:35.31	
9	Godfrey Siamusiye	Zambia	8:41.83	
10	Spencer Duval	England	8:49.08	
11	Shaun Creighton	Australia	8:54.27	
12	Zeba Crook	Canada	8:57.24	
13	Terrance Armstrong	Bermuda	9:06.99	
	Passmore Furusa	Zimbabwe	DNS	
