= Alessandro Lambruschini =

Italian long-distance runner

Personal information
- Nationality: Italian
- Born: 7 January 1965 (age 61) Fucecchio, Italy
- Height: 1.78 m (5 ft 10 in)
- Weight: 63 kg (139 lb)

Sport
- Country: Italy
- Sport: Athletics
- Event: 3000 metres steeplechase
- Club: G.S. Fiamme Oro

Achievements and titles
- Personal bests: 1500 m: 3:35.27 min (1987); 3000 m: 7:44.7 min (1997); 3000 m st: 8:08.78 min (1993)
Medal record
Men's athletics
Representing Italy
| Event | 1st | 2nd | 3rd |
|---|---|---|---|
| Olympic Games | 0 | 0 | 1 |
| World Championships | 0 | 0 | 1 |
| European Championships | 1 | 1 | 1 |
| Mediterranean Games | 1 | 1 | 0 |
| World Cup | 0 | 1 | 1 |
| European Cup | 5 | 2 | 1 |
Olympic Games
| Bronze medal – third place | 1996 Atlanta | 3000 m st. |
World Championships
| Bronze medal – third place | 1993 Stuttgart | 3000 m st. |
European Championships
| Gold medal – first place | 1994 Helsinki | 3000 m st. |
| Silver medal – second place | 1998 Budapest | 3000 m st. |
| Bronze medal – third place | 1990 Split | 3000 m st. |
Mediterranean Games
| Gold medal – first place | 1987 Latakia | 3000 m st. |
| Silver medal – second place | 1991 Athens | 3000 m st. |

Alessandro Lambruschini (born 7 January 1965) is an Italian former long-distance runner who specialized in the 3000 metres steeplechase.

== Biography ==
Lambruschini participated in three Summer Olympics (1988, 1992, 1996), he has 40 caps in national team from 1985 to 1998. He won 17 international athletics competitions in 3000 metres steeplechase, including two at the IAAF World Cup and eight in the European Cup. After his retirement from competitions, he is dedicated himself to duathlon, also getting good results in the master categories.

== Achievements ==
| Year | Competition | Venue | Position | Event | Notes |
Representing Italy
| 1986 | European Indoor Championships | Madrid, Spain | 7th | 1500 m | 3:49.95 |
| 1986 | European Championships | Stuttgart, West Germany | 22nd (h) | 3000 m s'chase | 8:49.90 |
| 1987 | European Indoor Championships | Liévin, France | 11th (h) | 1500 m | 3:50.04 |
| 1987 | World Indoor Championships | Indianapolis, United States | 8th | 1500 m | 3:42.25 |
| 1987 | World Indoor Championships | Indianapolis, United States | – | 3000 m | DNF |
| 1987 | World Championships | Rome, Italy | 9th | 3000 m s'chase | 8:24.25 |
| 1987 | Mediterranean Games | Latakia, Syria | 1st | 3000 m s'chase | 8:19.72 |
| 1988 | Olympic Games | Seoul, South Korea | 4th | 3000 m s'chase | 8:12.17 |
| 1989 | World Cup | Barcelona, Spain | 2nd | 3000 m s'chase | 8:21.75^{1} |
| 1990 | European Championships | Split, Yugoslavia | 3rd | 3000 m s'chase | 8:15.82 |
| 1991 | Mediterranean Games | Athens, Greece | 2nd | 3000 m s'chase | 8:22.95 |
| 1992 | Olympic Games | Barcelona, Spain | 4th | 3000 m s'chase | 8:15.52 |
| 1993 | World Championships | Stuttgart, Germany | 3rd | 3000 m s'chase | 8:08.78 |
| 1994 | European Championships | Helsinki, Finland | 1st | 3000 m s'chase | 8:22.40 |
| 1995 | World Championships | Gothenburg, Sweden | 10th | 3000 m s'chase | 8:22.64 |
| 1996 | Olympic Games | Atlanta, United States | 3rd | 3000 m s'chase | 8:11.28 |
| 1997 | World Championships | Athens, Greece | 8th (h) | 3000 m s'chase | 8:26.35 |
| 1998 | European Championships | Budapest, Hungary | 2nd | 3000 m s'chase | 8:16.70 |

^{1}Representing Europe

== National titles ==
Lambruschini is a ten-time individual national champion.

- 2 wins in 1500 metres (1986, 1993)
- 6 wins in 3000 metres steeplechase (1986, 1987, 1990, 1992, 1994, 1996)
- 2 wins in 3000 metres indoor (1991, 1992)

== Personal life ==
Lambruschini was in a relationship with American footballer Jill Rutten while she played in Italy.

== See also ==
- Italian all-time lists - 1500 metres
- Italian all-time lists - 3000 metres steeplechase
- FIDAL Hall of Fame
- Italy national athletics team – Most caps
