= Gideon Chirchir =

Kenyan steeplechase athlete

Personal information
- Born: 24 February 1966 (age 60)

Sport
- Country: Kenya
- Sport: Athletics
- Event: 3000 metres steeplechase
Medal record
Commonwealth Games
Silver medal – second place	1994 Victoria	3000 m steeplechase
All-Africa Games
Silver medal – second place	1995 Harare	3000 m steeplechase

Gideon Chirchir (born 24 February 1966) is a Kenyan former steeplechase athlete.

Chirchir was a 3000 metres steeplechase silver medalist at both the 1994 Commonwealth Games and 1995 All-Africa Games. At the 1995 IAAF World Cross Country Championships in Durham, Chirchir was a member of the Kenyan team which claimed a gold medal in the senior men's race. He is now an athletics coach.
