= Chris Unthank =

Australian steeplechase runner

Personal information
- Nationality: Australian
- Born: August 31, 1972 (age 54) Frankston, Victoria, Australia
- Years active: 1990-2000

Sport
- Country: Australia
- Sport: Athletics
- Event: 3000 metres steeplechase

Christopher Mark Unthank (born 31 August 1972) is a retired Australian athlete who specialised in the 3000 metres steeplechase. He represented his country at two Summer Olympics, in 1996 and 2000, reaching the semifinals on the first occasion.

== Competition record ==
Year	Competition	Venue	Position	Event	Notes
Representing Australia
1990	World Junior Championships	Plovdiv, Bulgaria	25th	20 km road run	1:10:02
1995	Universiade	Fukuoka, Japan	16th	3000 m s-chase	8:59.31
1996	Olympic Games	Atlanta, United States	13th (sf)	3000 m s-chase	8:25.59
1997	World Championships	Athens, Greece	23rd (h)	3000 m s-chase	8:32.03
1998	Commonwealth Games	Kuala Lumpur, Malaysia	5th	3000 m s-chase	8:37.24
2000	Olympic Games	Sydney, Australia	36th (h)	3000 m s-chase	9:11.19

== Personal bests ==
- One mile – 4:00.50 (Melbourne 1998)
- 5000 metres – 13:56.24 (Melbourne 1997)
- 3000 metres steeplechase – 8:24.48 (Hechtel 1997)
