= Athletics at the 1999 Pan American Games – Men's 3000 metres steeplechase =

Men's 3,000 metres steeplechase at the Pan American Games

The men's 3000 metres steeplechase event at the 1999 Pan American Games was held on July 25.

== Results ==
Rank	Name	Nationality	Time	Notes
1st place, gold medalist(s)	Joël Bourgeois	Canada	8:35.03	
2nd place, silver medalist(s)	Francis O'Neill	United States	8:35.73	
3rd place, bronze medalist(s)	Jean-Nicolas Duval	Canada	8:39.52	
4	Robert Gary	United States	8:56.01	
5	Johnny Loria	Costa Rica	9:06.16	
	Emigadio Delgado	Venezuela	DNF	
