= Florin Ionescu =

Romanian male steeplechaser

Personal information
- Born: 3 February 1971 (age 55) Iași, Romania
- Height: 1.80 m (5 ft 11 in)
- Weight: 67 kg (148 lb)

Sport
- Sport: Track and field
- Event: 3000 metres steeplechase

Florin Ionescu (born 3 February 1971 in Iași) is a retired Romanian athlete who specialised in the 3000 metres steeplechase. He represented his country at two Olympic Games, in 1996 and 2000. In addition he reached the final at three consecutive World Championships starting in 1995.

His personal best in the event is 8:13.26 set in Seville in 1999. This is the standing national record.

== Competition record ==
Year	Competition	Venue	Position	Event	Notes
Representing Romania
1990	World Junior Championships	Plovdiv, Bulgaria	10th	3000 m s'chase	9:04.30
1995	World Championships	Gothenburg, Sweden	6th	3000 m s'chase	8:15.44
1996	Olympic Games	Atlanta, United States	15th (sf)	3000 m s'chase	8:28.77
1997	World Championships	Athens, Greece	12th	3000 m s'chase	8:39.67
1999	World Championships	Seville, Spain	8th	3000 m s'chase	8:18.17
2000	Olympic Games	Sydney, Australia	27th (h)	3000 m s'chase	8:37.44
