= Vladimir Pronin (runner) =

Personal information
- Born: 27 May 1969 (age 57) Moscow, Soviet Union
- Height: 1.84 m (6 ft 0 in)
- Weight: 69 kg (152 lb)

Sport
- Sport: Track and field
- Event: 3000 metres steeplechase
- Club: Luch Moscow, Spartak Moscow
Medal record
Representing Russia
Summer Universiade
Silver medal – second place	1993 Buffalo	3000 m steeplechase

Vladimir Pronin (Russian: Владимир Пронин; born 27 May 1969) is a retired Russian track and field athlete who specialised in the 3000 metres steeplechase. He represented his country two Olympic Games, in 1996 and 2000, as well as three consecutive World Championships starting in 1993.

His personal best in the event is 8:16.59 set in Gothenburg in 1995.

== Competition record ==
Year	Competition	Venue	Position	Event	Notes
Representing the Unified Team
1992	World Cup	Havana, Cuba	5th	3000 m s'chase	8:45.35
Representing Russia
1993	Universiade	Buffalo, United States	2nd	3000 m s'chase	8:32.03
1993	World Championships	Stuttgart, Germany	20th (h)	3000 m s'chase	8:32.26
1994	Goodwill Games	St. Petersburg, Russia	5th	3000 m s'chase	8:29.40
1994	European Championships	Helsinki, Finland	5th	3000 m s'chase	8:26.33
1995	World Championships	Gothenburg, Sweden	7th	3000 m s'chase	8:16.59
1996	Olympic Games	Atlanta, United States	18th (sf)	3000 m s'chase	8:34.79
1997	World Championships	Athens, Greece	14th (sf)	3000 m s'chase	8:29.39
1997	Universiade	Catania, Italy	4th	3000 m s'chase	8:31.35
2000	Olympic Games	Sydney, Australia	34th (h)	3000 m s'chase	8:57.69
