= Anthony Famiglietti =

American track and field athlete

Personal information
- Full name: Anthony N. Famiglietti
- Nickname: Fam
- Born: November 8, 1978 (age 47) Medford, New York, U.S.
- Height: 5 ft 8 in (173 cm)
- Weight: 126 lb (57 kg)
Medal record
Representing United States
Summer Universiade
Gold medal – first place	2001 Beijing	3000m steeplechase
Pan American Games
Bronze medal – third place	2003 Santo Domingo	3000m steeplechase

Anthony N. Famiglietti (born November 8, 1978) is an American track and field athlete who competes professionally for Skechers Performance and Reckless Running. He was formerly sponsored by Adidas. He has competed for the U.S. in the 3000 meter steeplechase at the 2004 Olympic Games and the 2008 Olympic Games. In December 2019 he ran a World Record treadmill mile of 3:55. He has the first known recorded sub-4 mile ever run on a treadmill. In January 2020 he followed up his mile with a World Record 2 mile run of 8:24 at the Endurance Exchange hosted by USA Triathlon. He is current training to make his 5th Olympic trials and 3rd Olympic team. In spring 2020 he is hoping to become the fourth human being ever to break 4-minute mile on the track at 40 years old.

He has competed in a variety of middle and long distance events, ranging from the 1500 meters/mile to the 10,000 meters. He is also famous for having trained alone in New York City for many years but currently trains in Davidson, North Carolina.

Famiglietti is the subject of the independent documentary Run Reckless, which was released at the Running Movie Festival in Eugene, Oregon, at the Olympic Trials EugeneFest.

== Collegiate career ==
After graduating from Patchogue-Medford High School on Long Island, New York, Famiglietti attended Appalachian State University and the University of Tennessee, where he graduated in 2000. At Appalachian State, Famiglietti was 1996 Southern Conference Freshman of the year in Cross Country and 1997 Southern Conference XC Runner of the Year runner-up. On the track, he was 1998 Southern Conference Champion in both the steeplechase and the 5000 meters. In 1998, he transferred to Tennessee, where he placed 11th at the SEC Cross Country Championships and 75th at the NCAA Cross Country Championships. In 1999, he was 6th at the NCAA Outdoor Championships in the steeplechase, and 8th in his heat at the U.S. Championships. In 2000, his final year of college, Fam was 2nd at the SEC Championships, 4th at the NCAA Championships, and 7th at the U.S. Olympic Trials, where he ran an 8:25.37.

== Late career ==
In May 2018, Famiglietti announced that he would attempt to become the fourth master's runner to break the four-minute mile barrier. On February 9, 2019, he ran a 3:59 mile while tied to a dog named Bailey. It was run on a wheel measured cement course through a green space.

== Achievements ==
- 2009 USA 15 km ROAD Championship – 1st Place
- 2008 USA 5 km ROAD Championships – 1st Place
- 2008 Beijing Olympic Games – 13th Place (final round), 3000 meter steeplechase
- 2008 USA Olympic Trials – 1st Place, 3000 meter steeplechase
- 2007 Adidas Track Classic – 1st Place, 3000 meters
- 2007 USA 8K Championships – 1st Place, 8 kilometers
- 2006 USA Outdoor Championships – 4th Place, 10,000 meters
- 2006 Reebok Grand Prix – 3rd Place, 1 mile
- 2005 USA Outdoor Championships – 2nd Place, 3000 meter steeplechase
- 2005 Adidas Track Classic – 1st Place, 3000 meter steeplechase
- 2004 Athens Olympic Games – 8th Place (opening round), 3000 meter steeplechase
- 2004 USA Olympic Trials – 2nd Place, 3000 meter steeplechase
- 2004 Penn Relays – 1st Place, 3000 meter steeplechase
- 2003 Pan Am Games – 3rd Place, 3000 meter steeplechase
- 2002 USA Outdoor Championships – 1st Place, 3000 meter steeplechase
- 2001 World University Games – 1st Place, 3000 meter steeplechase
- 2001 USA Outdoor Championships – 2nd Place, 3000 meter steeplechase
- 2001 USA Indoor Championships – 4th Place, 3000 meters
- 2000 NCAA Outdoor Championships – 4th Place, 3000 meter steeplechase
- 1999 NCAA Outdoor Championships – 6th Place, 3000 meter steeplechase
- 2012 Inducted into the Suffolk Sports Hall of Fame on Long Island in the Track & Field Category

== Personal bests ==
Distance	Time	Year	Place
1500 Meters	3:35.83	2004	Rieti
Mile	3:55.71	2006	New York City
3000 Meter Steeplechase	8:17.34	2008	Beijing
5000 Meters	13:11.93	2007	Walnut
10,000 Meters	27:37.74	2006	Stanford
