= Cosmas Ndeti =

Kenyan long-distance runner

Personal information
- Nationality: Kenyan
- Born: 24 November 1971 (age 53)

Sport
- Sport: Athletics
- Event: Marathon

Cosmas Ndeti (born 24 November 1971) is a three-time winner of the Boston Marathon. He was the winner of the 1993, 1994, and 1995 races. He set the course record in 1994 with a time of 2:07:15, which was also the best marathon performance in 1994. That course record stood for 12 years until it was broken by one second when Robert Kipkoech Cheruiyot, a fellow Kenyan, won the 2006 race.

He received a three-month ban for doping, after failing a test for ephedrine at the 1988 IAAF World Cross Country Championships. This made him the first doping ban case in Kenyan history.

== Achievements ==
Year	Competition	Venue	Position	Event	Notes
Representing Kenya
1990	World Junior Championships	Plovdiv, Bulgaria	1st	20 km road run	59:42
1992	World Half Marathon Championships	Newcastle, United Kingdom	4th	Half marathon	1:01:34
1992	Honolulu Marathon	Honolulu, Hawaii	2nd	Marathon	2:14:28
1993	World Championships	Stuttgart, Germany	—	Marathon	DNF
1993	Boston Marathon	Boston, United States	1st	Marathon	2:09:33
1993	Honolulu Marathon	Honolulu, Hawaii	2nd	Marathon	2:13:40
1994	Boston Marathon	Boston, United States	1st	Marathon	2:07:15
1995	Boston Marathon	Boston, United States	1st	Marathon	2:09:22
1996	Boston Marathon	Boston, United States	3rd	Marathon	2:09:51
1996	New York City Marathon	New York City, United States	6th	Marathon	2:11:53
1997	World Championships	Athens, Greece	—	Marathon	DNF
1997	Fukuoka Marathon	Fukuoka, Japan	6th	Marathon	2:11:47
2000	Nagano Olympic Commemorative Marathon	Nagano, Japan	3rd	Marathon	2:12:52

== See also ==
- List of winners of the Boston Marathon
- List of doping cases in athletics
