= Néstor Nieves =

Venezuelan runner (born 1974)

Personal information
- Full name: Néstor Francisco Nieves
- Born: December 29, 1974 (age 51)

Sport
- Country: Venezuela
- Sport: Men's athletics
Medal record
Pan American Games
Gold medal – first place	2003 Santo Domingo	3000 m steeplechase
South American Games
Bronze medal – third place	1994 Valencia	3000 m steeplechase
Bolivarian Games
Silver medal – second place	2001 Ambato	3000 m steeplechase
Silver medal – second place	2005 Armenia	3000 m steeplechase
Pan American Junior Athletics Championships
Silver medal – second place	1991 Kingston	3000 m steeplechase

Néstor Francisco Nieves (born December 29, 1974) is a retired middle- and long-distance runner from Venezuela.

He won the gold medal in the men's 3000 metres steeplechase event at the 2003 Pan American Games in Santo Domingo, Dominican Republic. Nieves represented his native country at the 1996 Summer Olympics in Atlanta, Georgia. He was the bronze medallist at the 1998 Ibero-American Championships in Athletics.

Regionally, he won medals at the South American Games, Central American and Caribbean Games, Bolivarian Games and the Central American and Caribbean Championships in Athletics. He was the 2003 gold medallist in the steeplechase at the South American Championships in Athletics.

He was highly success at regional age category competitions, with a highlight being a triple gold medal win at the 1990 Central American and Caribbean Junior Championships in Athletics, which included a championship record in the 2000 metres steeplechase.

== International competitions ==
Year	Competition	Venue	Position	Event	Notes
Representing Venezuela
1988	Central American and Caribbean Junior Championships (U-17)	Nassau, Bahamas	6th	1500 m	4:17.20
1988	Central American and Caribbean Junior Championships (U-17)	Nassau, Bahamas	2nd	2000 m steeplechase	6:34.04
1990	Central American and Caribbean Junior Championships (U-17)	Havana, Cuba	1st	1500 m	3:59.32
1990	Central American and Caribbean Junior Championships (U-17)	Havana, Cuba	1st	3000 m	9:01.48
1990	Central American and Caribbean Junior Championships (U-17)	Havana, Cuba	1st	2000 m steeplechase	5:57.04
1994	South American Games	Valencia, Venezuela	3rd	3000 m steeplechase	
1996	Ibero-American Championships	Medellín, Colombia	4th	3000 m steeplechase	8:59.56
1996	Olympic Games	Atlanta, United States	30th (h)	3000 m steeplechase	8:47.34
1998	Ibero-American Championships	Lisbon, Portugal	3rd	3000 m steeplechase	8:30.07
1998	Central American and Caribbean Games	Maracaibo, Venezuela	2nd	3000 m steeplechase	8:43.34
1999	World Championships	Seville, Spain	9th (h)	3000 m steeplechase	8:28.59
2000	Ibero-American Championships	Rio de Janeiro, Brazil	5th	3000 m steeplechase	8:38.81
2001	Central American and Caribbean Championships	Guatemala City, Guatemala	2nd	3000 m steeplechase	9:01.48
2001	Bolivarian Games	Ambato, Ecuador	2nd	3000 m steeplechase	9:23.77 A
2002	Ibero-American Championships	Guatemala City, Guatemala	4th	3000 m steeplechase	9:08.00
2002	Central American and Caribbean Games	San Salvador, El Salvador	3rd	3000m steeplechase	8:53.56
2003	South American Championships	Barquisimeto, Venezuela	1st	3000 m steeplechase	8:46.41
2003	Pan American Games	Santo Domingo, Dominican Republic	1st	3000 m steeplechase	8:34.26
2004	Ibero-American Championships	Huelva, Spain	5th	3000 m steeplechase	8:39.58
2005	Bolivarian Games	Armenia, Colombia	2nd	3000 m steeplechase	9:07.13 A
2006	Central American and Caribbean Games	Cartagena, Colombia	2nd	3000 m steeplechase	8:44.86
