= Justin Chaston =

British steeplechaser

Personal information
- Nationality: British (Welsh)
- Born: 4 November 1968 (age 57) Cardiff, Wales
- Height: 178 cm (5 ft 10 in)
- Weight: 64 kg (141 lb)

Sport
- Sport: Athletics
- Event: Steeplechase
- Club: Belgrave Harriers

Justin Thomas Chaston (born 4 November 1968) is a retired Welsh athlete who specialised in the 3000 metres steeplechase. He represented Great Britain at three consecutive Summer Olympics in 1996, 2000 and 2004.

== Biography ==
At the 1996 Olympic Games in Atlanta, he represented Great Britain in the steeplechase event. He also represented Great Britain at the 2000 Olympic Games in Sydney and 2004 in Athens.

Chaston was a three-times British 3000 metres steeplechase champion after winning the British AAA Championships title in 1994, 1996 and 2004.

His personal best in the event is 8:23.90 from 1994.

== Competition record ==
Year	Competition	Venue	Position	Event	Notes
Representing Great Britain and Wales
1987	World Cross Country Championships	Warsaw, Poland	118th	Junior race	Individual
1994	Goodwill Games	St. Petersburg, Russia	6th	3000 m s'chase	8:29.49
1994	European Championships	Helsinki, Finland	11th	3000 m s'chase	8:36.83
1994	Commonwealth Games	Victoria, Canada	7th	3000 m s'chase	8:32.20
1995	World Championships	Gothenburg, Sweden	19th (sf)	3000 m s'chase	8:38.90
1995	Universiade	Fukuoka, Japan	5th	3000 m s'chase	8:39.28
1996	Olympic Games	Atlanta, United States	14th (sf)	3000 m s'chase	8:28.50
2000	Olympic Games	Sydney, Australia	19th (h)	3000 m s'chase	8:31.01
2004	Olympic Games	Athens, Greece	22nd (h)	3000 m s'chase	8:28.35
