= Athletics at the 1991 Summer Universiade – Men's 3000 metres steeplechase =

The men's 3000 metres steeplechase event at the 1991 Summer Universiade was held at the Don Valley Stadium in Sheffield on 21 and 23 July 1991.

== Medalists ==
Gold	Silver	Bronze
Shaun Creighton; Australia	Akira Nakamura; Japan	Gavin Gaynor; United States

== Results ==
=== Heats ===
Rank	Heat	Athlete	Nationality	Time	Notes
1	1	Shaun Creighton	Australia	8:33.95	Q
2	2	Akira Nakamura	Japan	8:34.18	Q
3	1	Andreas Fischer	Germany	8:35.09	Q
4	1	Atle Næsheim	Norway	8:35.77	q
5	1	Joël Bourgeois	Canada	8:36.96	q
6	2	Arto Kuusisto	Finland	8:39.41	Q
7	3	Gavin Gaynor	United States	8:39.50	Q
8	1	Ray Pugsley	United States	8:39.96	q
9	2	Henry Klassen	Canada	8:40.13	q
10	3	Jon Azkueta	Spain	8:41.21	Q
11	1	Andrea Bello	Italy	8:41.51	q
12	2	Azzedine Sakhri	Algeria	8:42.03	q
13	3	Raphaël Guegano	France	8:42.31	
14	3	Angelo Giardiello	Italy	8:43.69	
15	2	Inocencio López	Spain	8:45.13	
16	2	Vule Maksimović	Yugoslavia	8:45.48	
17	3	Christian Stang	Germany	8:47.18	
18	2	Hamid Sajjadi	Iran	8:48.39	
19	1	David Lee	Great Britain	8:49.46	
20	3	José Negrão	Portugal	8:59.45	
21	3	Ahmet Çetinbaş	Turkey	8:59.66	
22	3	John Kihonge	Kenya	9:06.79	
23	2	Mohamed El-Mesbahi	Morocco	9:10.66	
24	1	Peter Mwangi	Kenya	9:20.31	
25	1	Samuel Huwae	Indonesia	9:24.50	
	2	Spencer Duval	Great Britain	DNF	

=== Final ===
Rank	Athlete	Nationality	Time	Notes
1st place, gold medalist(s)	Shaun Creighton	Australia	8:32.30	
2nd place, silver medalist(s)	Akira Nakamura	Japan	8:33.50	
3rd place, bronze medalist(s)	Gavin Gaynor	United States	8:34.21	
4	Jon Azkueta	Spain	8:34.91	
5	Joël Bourgeois	Canada	8:38.82	
6	Arto Kuusisto	Finland	8:44.97	
7	Azzedine Sakhri	Algeria	8:45.28	
8	Andreas Fischer	Germany	8:48.81	
9	Ray Pugsley	United States	8:50.75	
10	Henry Klassen	Canada	8:52.90	
11	Andrea Bello	Italy	8:59.38	
	Atle Næsheim	Norway	DNF	
