= Martin Strege =

German runner (born 1966)

Martin Strege (born 21 February 1966 in Kassel) is a retired German runner who specialized in the 3000 metres steeplechase.

He finished fourteenth at the 1993 World Championships, sixth at the 1994 European Championships and eighth at the 1995 World Championships.

His personal best time is 8:18.57 minutes, achieved at the 1995 World Championships in Gothenburg. This result places him tenth on the German all-time performers list, behind Damian Kallabis, Hagen Melzer, Frank Baumgartl, Rainer Schwarz, Uwe Pflügner, Michael Karst, Steffen Brand, Patriz Ilg and Marc Ostendarp.

He became German steeplechase champion in 1994 and 1995. He later switched to the marathon race and won a national silver medal in 1999. The same year he ran in a personal best time of 2:13:35 hours in the Hamburg Marathon.
