= Keith Cullen (runner) =

British athlete

Personal information
- Nationality: British {English)
- Born: 13 June 1972 (age 53) Ilford, Greater London, England
- Height: 177 cm (5 ft 10 in)
- Weight: 61 kg (134 lb)

Sport
- Sport: Athletics
- Event: Steeplechase
- Club: Highgate Harriers; Chelmsford AC

Keith John Cullen (born 13 June 1972) is a male former long-distance runner from England who competed at two Olympic Games.

== Biography ==
At the 1996 Olympic Games in Atlanta, Cullen represented Great Britain in the men's 3000 metres steeplechase, where he was eliminated in the semi-finals.

He represented England in the 5,000 metres event, at the 1998 Commonwealth Games in Kuala Lumpur, Malaysia.

Cullen represented Great Britain at the 2000 Summer Olympics in the men's marathon and finished in 19th place, clocking 2:16:59. He finished on the podium on three occasions at the AAA Championships in 1992, 1995 and 1996.

He is now a Graphic Designer living in North London.

== Achievements ==
Year	Competition	Venue	Position	Event	Notes
Representing Great Britain and England
1990	World Junior Championships	Plovdiv, Bulgaria	19th (h)	3000 m s'chase	9:08.39
1995	World Championships	Gothenburg, Sweden	26th (h)	3000 m s'chase	8:32.07
1996	Olympic Games	Atlanta, United States	22nd (sf)	3000 m s'chase	8:46.74
1997	World Championships	Athens, Greece	21st (h)	5000 m	13:42.40
1998	European Championships	Budapest, Hungary	11th	10,000 m	28:34.34
1998	Commonwealth Games	Kuala Lumpur, Malaysia	5th	5000 m	13:44.69
1999	World Championships	Seville, Spain	27th (h)	5000 m	13:53.92
2000	Olympic Games	Sydney, Australia	19th	Marathon	2:16:59
