= Jim Svenøy =

Norwegian steeplechase runner

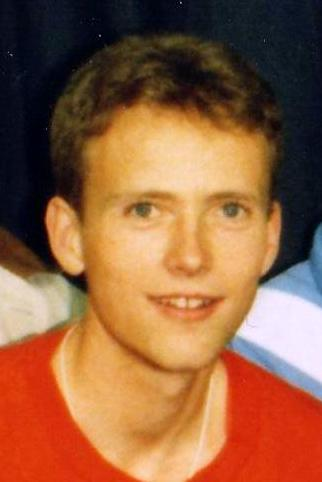
- Jim Svenøy image

Medal record

Men's athletics

Representing Norway

European Championships
Bronze medal – third place	1998 Budapest	3000 m st.

Jim Svenøy (born 22 April 1972, in Fræna Municipality) is a retired Norwegian athlete who specialized in the 3000 metre steeplechase.

Svenøy was an NCAA champion runner for the UTEP Miners track and field team, winning the steeplechase at the 1994 NCAA Division I Outdoor Track and Field Championships and 1995 NCAA Division I Outdoor Track and Field Championships.

== Competition record ==
Year	Competition	Venue	Position	Event	Notes
Representing Norway
1990	World Junior Championships	Plovdiv, Bulgaria	18th (h)	3000 m s'chase	9:07.46
1991	European Junior Championships	Thessaloniki, Greece	3rd	3000 m s'chase	8:50.02
1993	World Championships	Stuttgart, Germany	19th (h)	3000 m s'chase	8:29.34
1994	European Championships	Helsinki, Finland	7th	3000 m s'chase	8:28.12
1995	World Championships	Gothenburg, Sweden	20th (sf)	3000 m s'chase	8:40.53
1996	Olympic Games	Atlanta, United States	8th	3000 m s'chase	8:23.39
1997	World Championships	Athens, Greece	7th	3000 m s'chase	8:14.80 (NR)
1998	European Indoor Championships	Valencia, Spain	13th (h)	3000 m	8:03.00
1998	European Championships	Budapest, Hungary	3rd	3000 m s'chase	8:18.97
1999	World Championships	Seville, Spain	19th (h)	3000 m s'chase	8:23.05
2000	Olympic Games	Sydney, Australia	9th	3000 m s'chase	8:27.20
2001	World Championships	Edmonton, Canada	18th (h)	3000 m s'chase	8:35.71
2002	European Championships	Munich, Germany	17th (h)	3000 m s'chase	8:38.85
