= Angelo Carosi =

Italian long-distance runner

Personal information
- Nationality: Italian
- Born: 20 January 1964 (age 62) Priverno, Italy
- Height: 1.82 m (5 ft 11 1/2 in)
- Weight: 66 kg (146 lb)

Sport
- Country: Italy
- Sport: Athletics
- Events: Steeplechase; Long distance running
- Club: G.S. Forestale

Achievements and titles
- Personal bests: 3000 m st: 8:14.02 (1994); 5000 m: 13:25.83 (1993); Half marathon: 1:03:6 (2001); Marathon: 2:12:46 (2001)
Medal record
Men's athletics
Representing Italy
European Championships
Silver medal – second place	1994 Helsinki	3000 m st.

Angelo Carosi (born 20 January 1964 in Priverno) is an Italian long-distance runner who specialized in the 3000 metres steeplechase. In his later career he also took up half marathon and marathon.

== Biography ==
He ran four times consecutively in the 3000 meters steeplechase at the IAAF World Championships in Athletics (1991, 1993, 1995, 1997). Carosi won three medals, at senior level, at the International athletics competitions. He participated at one edition of the Summer Olympics (1996), he has 29 caps in national team from 1989 to 2000.

== Achievements ==
Year	Competition	Venue	Position	Event	Notes
1990	European Championships	Split, Yugoslavia	4th	3000 m steeplechase	8:17.48
1991	World Championships	Tokyo, Japan	7th	3000 m steeplechase	8:20.80
1994	European Championships	Helsinki, Finland	2nd	3000 m steeplechase	8:23.53
1995	World Championships	Gothenburg, Sweden	5th	3000 m steeplechase	8:14.85
1995	Military World Games	Rome, Italy	2nd	3000 m steeplechase	8:18.85
1996	Olympic Games	Atlanta, United States	9th	3000 m steeplechase	8:29.67
1997	World Championships	Athens, Greece	8th	3000 m steeplechase	8:16.01

== Marathons ==
Year	Competition	Venue	Position	Notes
2000	Florence Marathon	Florence, Italy	1st	2:14:11
2003	Florence Marathon	Florence, Italy	1st	2:15:54

== National titles ==
He won eight individual titles in his career at the Italian Athletics Championships. Spanning 15 years, he won his first national title 1989 and his last in 2004 at 40 years old.

- 3 wins in the 3000 metres steeplechase (1989, 1991, 2004)
- 2 wins in the 5000 metres (1994, 1998)
- 2 wins in the marathon (2001, 2003)
- 1 win in the 3000 metres indoor (1990)

== See also ==
- World records in masters athletics - 3000 metres steeplechase
- List of Italian records in masters athletics
- Italian all-time lists - 3000 metres steeplechase
