= Shadrack Mogotsi =

South African middle-distance runner

Personal information
- Full name: Shadrack Moeletsi Mogotsi
- Nationality: South African
- Born: 12 December 1962 (age 63)

Sport
- Sport: Middle-distance running
- Event: Steeplechase

Shadrack Moeletsi Mogotsi (born 12 December 1962) is a South African middle-distance runner. He competed in the men's 3000 metres steeplechase at the 1996 Summer Olympics.
