= Moses Kiptanui =

Kenyan runner (born 1970)

Personal information
- Born: 1 October 1970 (age 55) Marakwet District, Kenya
Medal record
Men's athletics
Representing Kenya
Olympic Games
Silver medal – second place	1996 Atlanta	3000 m steeplechase
World Championships
Gold medal – first place	1991 Tokyo	3000 m steeplechase
Gold medal – first place	1993 Stuttgart	3000 m steeplechase
Gold medal – first place	1995 Gothenburg	3000 m steeplechase
Silver medal – second place	1997 Athens	3000 m steeplechase
African Championships
Gold medal – first place	1990 Cairo	1500 m
World Junior Championships
Gold medal – first place	1990 Plovdiv	1500 m

Moses Kiptanui (born 1 October 1970) is a Kenyan middle and long distance athlete mostly famous for 3000 metres steeplechase in which he was the number one ranked athlete from 1991 to 1995 and three time IAAF World Champion. Kiptanui was the first man to ever run the 3000m steeplechase in under eight minutes. He is also known for his coaching role in his later years with Tarbert GAA.

== Early life, family and education ==
Kiptanui is from Kenya. His younger brother, Philemon Tanui, attended University of Wyoming and ran competitively for the school.

== Career ==
Kiptanui emerged in 1991 as a relatively unknown athlete. He won several IAAF Grand Prix races that season. He celebrated an especially spectacular victory in Zürich where he fell on the track on the last lap but still won easily. He was known as a highly confident and somewhat cocky athlete, who was self-coached and driven by his own self belief.

His victory at the 1991 World Championships in Athletics in Tokyo therefore came as no surprise. To the great disappointment of many observers he was not included in the Kenyan team at the 1992 Summer Olympics in Barcelona. Kiptanui had failed to qualify at the Kenyan trials in Nairobi.

However, shortly after the Olympics he set a new world record over 3000m in Cologne with a time of 7:28.96 min. Only three days later he also broke the 3000m steeplechase world record in 8:02.08 in Zürich. The following year, he defended the World Championship title easily in Stuttgart. He won the steeplechase at the 1994 IAAF World Cup.

In 1995, he broke the 5000m world record in Rome in a time of 12:55.30 min (8 June). After collecting his third World Championship gold medal in Gothenburg he also set the new 3000m steeplechase record in Zürich in a time of 7:59.18 min (16 August), the first man in history to ever dip under eight minutes for the 3000m steeplechase.

A year later, he achieved an Olympic silver medal at the 1996 Summer Olympics in Atlanta. He was defeated by fellow Kenyan Joseph Keter. The next year, at the 1997 World Championships in Athletics in Athens, Kiptanui failed to win his fourth consecutive gold medal, but took silver. The winner was Wilson Boit Kipketer, also from Kenya.

He was still active in 2001 sighting the 2002 Commonwealth Games, but did not compete there.

After retirement, he was a running coach. In 2008, he coached the 2004 Olympic gold medalist, Ezekiel Kemboi. He has also been the chairman of the Marakwet District branch of Athletics Kenya.

== Legacy ==
A school was built by Shoe4Africa to honor the lifetime achievements of Kiptanui. The Shoe4Africa Moses Kiptanui School was opened in 2012 at Kamoi district, Marakwet and has eight primary classes with 320 students. Two ancillary early childhood development classes were added in 2015.

== Major achievements ==
- 1990
  - 1990 African Championships in Athletics – Cairo, Egypt
    - 1500m gold medal
  - 1990 IAAF World Junior Championships – Plovdiv, Bulgaria
    - 1500m gold medal
- 1991
  - 1991 World Championships in Athletics – Tokyo, Japan
    - 3000m steeplechase gold medal
  - 1991 All-Africa Games – Cairo, Egypt
    - 3000m steeplechase gold medal
- 1993
  - 1993 World Championships in Athletics – Stuttgart, Germany
    - 3000m steeplechase gold medal
- 1994
  - 1994 Goodwill Games – Saint Petersburg, Russia
    - 5000m gold medal
- 1995
  - 1995 World Championships in Athletics – Gothenburg, Sweden
    - 3000m steeplechase gold medal
- 1996
  - 1996 Summer Olympics – Atlanta, United States
    - 3000 m steeplechase silver medal
- 1997
  - 1997 World Championships in Athletics – Athens, Greece
    - 3000m steeplechase silver medal

Records
Preceded by Saïd Aouita	Men's 3000 m World Record Holder; August 16, 1992 – August 2, 1994	Succeeded by Noureddine Morceli
Preceded by Haile Gebrselassie	Men's 5000 m World Record Holder; June 6, 1995 – August 16, 1995	Succeeded by Haile Gebrselassie
Preceded by Peter Koech	Men's Steeplechase World Record Holder; August 19, 1992 – August 13, 1997	Succeeded by Wilson Boit Kipketer
Sporting positions
Preceded by Dieter Baumann	Men's 3000 m Best Year Performance; 1992	Succeeded by Noureddine Morceli
Preceded by Noureddine Morceli	Men's 3000 m Best Year Performance; 1995	Succeeded by Daniel Komen
Preceded by Yobes Ondieki	Men's 5000 m Best Year Performance; 1992	Succeeded by Ismael Kirui
Preceded by Peter Koech	Men's 3000 m Steeple Best Year Performance; 1991 – 1995	Succeeded by John Kosgei
