= Athletics at the 2003 Pan American Games – Men's 3000 metres steeplechase =

Men's 3,000 metres steeplechase at the Pan American Games

The Men's 3,000 metres Steeplechase event at the 2003 Pan American Games took place on 7 August 2003. Venezuelan Néstor Nieves defeated title holder Joël Bourgeois from Canada.

== Medalists ==
Gold	Néstor Nieves; Venezuela
Silver	Joël Bourgeois; Canada
Bronze	Anthony Famiglietti; United States

== Records ==
World Record	Brahim Boulami (MAR)	7:55.28	August 24, 2001	Brussels, Belgium
Pan Am Record	Wander Moura (BRA)	8:14.41	March 22, 1995	Mar del Plata, Argentina

== Results ==
Rank	Athlete	Time
1	Néstor Nieves (VEN)	8:34.26
2	Joël Bourgeois (CAN)	8:36.78
3	Anthony Famiglietti (USA)	8:40.22
4	Tom Chorny (USA)	8:45.35
5	José Salvador Miranda (MEX)	8:47.84
6	David Milne (CAN)	8:59.37
7	Richard Arias (ECU)	9:21.91
—	Alexander Greaux (PUR)	DSQ

== See also ==
- 2003 World Championships in Athletics – Men's 3000 metres steeplechase
- Athletics at the 2004 Summer Olympics – Men's 3000 metre steeplechase
