= Athletics at the 1999 Summer Universiade – Men's 3000 metres steeplechase =

The men's 3000 metres steeplechase event at the 1999 Summer Universiade was held at the Estadio Son Moix in Palma de Mallorca, Spain on 9–11 July.

== Medalists ==
Gold	Silver	Bronze
Giuseppe Maffei; Italy	Khamis Abdullah Saifeldin; Qatar	Joël Bourgeois; Canada

== Results ==
=== Heats ===
Rank	Heat	Athlete	Nationality	Time	Notes
1	2	Khamis Abdullah Saifeldin	Qatar	8:33.48	Q
2	2	Giuseppe Maffei	Italy	8:35.01	Q
3	2	Christian Belz	Switzerland	8:35.62	Q
4	2	Aziz Driouche	Morocco	8:35.76	Q
5	2	José María González	Spain	8:35.89	q
6	1	Joël Bourgeois	Canada	8:37.59	Q
7	1	Carlos Suárez	Spain	8:38.84	Q
8	1	Iaroslav Muşinschi	Moldova	8:38.98	Q
9	1	Frank Bruder	Germany	8:39.25	Q
10	1	Chuck Sloan	United States	8:39.71	q
11	2	Anthony Cosey	United States	8:40.54	q
12	2	Chris McGregor	Canada	8:41.60	q
13	1	Abdelhakim Maazouz	Algeria	8:42.24	
14	1	Cédric Andres	France	8:42.76	
15	2	Stathis Stasi	Cyprus	8:48.33	
16	1	Martin Dent	Australia	8:48.96	
17	1	Joel Johansson	Sweden	8:55.47	
18	2	Jhonny Loría	Costa Rica	9:00.27	
19	2	Solomon Kandie	Kenya	9:09.52	
20	1	Francisco Gómez	Costa Rica	9:12.33	
21	1	Ramiro Paris	Argentina	9:25.76	
22	2	Christophe Irumva	Rwanda	9:40.01	
23	2	Joel Kgokong	South Africa	9:55.22	
	1	Mārtiņš Alksnis	Latvia	DNS	
	1	Daniel Njenga	Kenya	DNS	
	2	Peter Öhman	Sweden	DNS	

=== Final ===
Rank	Athlete	Nationality	Time	Notes
1st place, gold medalist(s)	Giuseppe Maffei	Italy	8:33.18	
2nd place, silver medalist(s)	Khamis Abdullah Saifeldin	Qatar	8:33.82	
3rd place, bronze medalist(s)	Joël Bourgeois	Canada	8:34.20	
4	José María González	Spain	8:35.73	
5	Aziz Driouche	Morocco	8:35.78	
6	Christian Belz	Switzerland	8:39.25	
7	Chris McGregor	Canada	8:40.78	
8	Frank Bruder	Germany	8:42.86	
9	Carlos Suárez	Spain	8:43.49	
10	Anthony Cosey	United States	8:44.66	
11	Iaroslav Muşinschi	Moldova	8:46.37	
12	Chuck Sloan	United States	8:51.96	
