= Joseph Keter =

Kenyan athlete

Personal information
- Nationality: Kenyan
- Born: 3 June 1969 (age 57) Lessos, Nandi, Kenya
- Height: 178 cm (5 ft 10 in)
- Weight: 64 kg (141 lb)

Sport
- Sport: Athletics
- Event: steeplechase / long distance
Medal record
Men's athletics
Representing Kenya
Olympic Games
Gold medal – first place	1996 Atlanta	3000 m st.
African Championships
Gold medal – first place	1993 Durban	3000 m st.

Joseph Keter (born 13 June 1969) is a former Kenyan athlete, who won the gold medal in the 3000 metres steeplechase at the 1996 Summer Olympics.

== Biography ==
Born in Lessos, Nandi District was an officer in the Kenyan Army.

Keter won the British AAA Championships title in the 3,000 metres (flat) event at the 1993 AAA Championships.

At the 1992 Olympic Games in Atlanta, the hot favourite to win the 3000 m steeplechase gold medal was a world record holder Moses Kiptanui. But in the Olympic final, Kiptanui was strongly challenged by his Armed Forces' colleague Keter. The Kenyan pair reached the final water jump side by side, but then Keter slowly edged ahead to win the gold medal by 1.11 seconds.

After the Olympic Games, Keter beat Kiptanui again in Zürich, running his personal best 8.05.99. After that season, Keter kept running for some seasons and won the IAAF Grand Prix in 3000 m steeplechase in 1997.
