= Joël Bourgeois =

Canadian runner (born 1971)

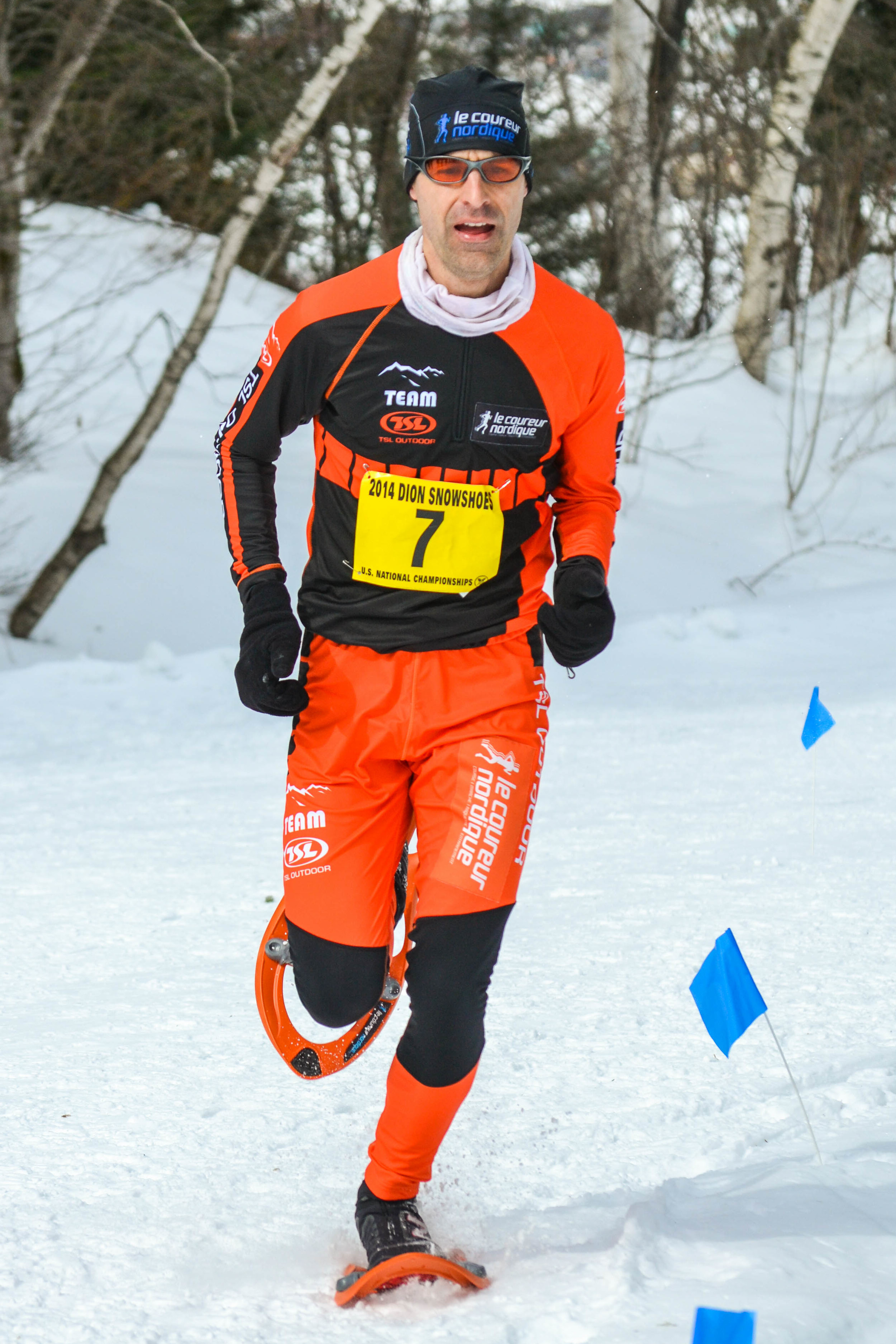
- Bourgeois in 2014

Personal information
- Born: April 25, 1971 (age 55) Moncton, New Brunswick, Canada
- Home town: Grande-Digue, New Brunswick, Canada
- Height: 5 ft 9 in(1.75 m)
- Weight: 130 lb (59 kg)

Sport
- Sport: Running
- Event: 3000 m Steeplechase
- College team: Moncton Aigles Bleu
- Club: O2

Achievements and titles
- Personal bests: 2000m Steeplechase: 5:39.31 (Sevilla 2002); 3000m Steeplechase: 8:20.08 (La Laguna 1999)
Medal record
Representing Canada
Athletics
Pan American Games
Gold medal – first place	1999 Winnipeg	3000 m Steeple
Silver medal – second place	2003 Santo Domingo	3000 m Steeple
Universiade
Silver medal – second place	1995 Fukuoka	3000 m Steeple
Snowshoe running
World Championships
Bronze medal – third place	2015 Quebec City	Men's overall

Joël Denis Bourgeois (born April 25, 1971 in Moncton, New Brunswick) is a middle and long-distance runner competing for Canada. He represented Canada twice at the Summer Olympics in 1996 and 2000.

== Biography ==
He won the gold medal for Canada in the men's 3000 metres steeplechase at the 1999 Pan American Games in Winnipeg, Manitoba, Canada, and the silver medal in the same event at the 2003 Pan American Games in Santo Domingo, Dominican Republic. He won the silver medal for Canada in the men's 3000 metres steeplechase at the 1995 summer Universiade and the bronze medal in the same event at the 1999.

Still competing in competitions around Canada and at world master events, Bourgeois' goal is to coach the next generation of champions, including Geneviève Lalonde and Ryan Cassidy who have both became Canadian champions in the steeplechase and distance events and have represented Canada in various international events, including the 2010 World Junior Championships in Athletics, held in Moncton, New Brunswick.

== Statistics ==
=== Personal bests ===
Event	Best	Location	Date
2000 meter Steeplechase	5:39.31	La Laguna	14 September 2002
3000 meter Steeplechase	8:20.08	Sevilla	28 May 1999

=== Competition record ===
Year	Competition	Venue	Position	Event	Notes
Representing Canada
1990	World Junior Championships	Plovdiv, Bulgaria	6th	3000 m s-chase	8:51.80
1991	Universiade	Sheffield, United Kingdom	5th	3000 m s-chase	8:38.82
1993	Universiade	Buffalo, United States	5th	3000 m s-chase	8:33.96
1994	Commonwealth Games	Victoria, British Columbia, Canada	6th	3000 m s-chase	8:31.19
1995	Pan American Games	Mar del Plata, Argentina	6th	3000 m s-chase	8:45.62
1995	Universiade	Fukuoka, Japan	2nd	3000 m s-chase	8:28.44
1996	Olympic Games	Atlanta, United States	16th	3000 m s-chase	8:31.45
1998	Commonwealth Games	Kuala Lumpur, Malaysia	4th	3000 m s-chase	8:34.50
1999	Universiade	Palma de Mallorca, Spain	3rd	3000 m s-chase	8:34.20
1999	Pan American Games	Winnipeg, Manitoba, Canada	1st	3000 m s-chase	8:35.03
1999	World Championships	Seville, Spain	31st (h)	3000 m s-chase	8:37.94
2000	Olympic Games	Sydney, Australia	17th	3000 m s-chase	8:28.07
2001	Jeux de la Francophonie	Ottawa, Ontario, Canada	4th	3000 m s-chase	8:28.72
2001	World Championships	Edmonton, Alberta, Canada	14th	3000 m s-chase	8:36.38
2002	Commonwealth Games	Manchester, United Kingdom	5th	3000 m s-chase	8:33.98
2003	Pan American Games	Santo Domingo, Dominican Republic	2nd	3000 m s-chase	8:36.78
2009	Jeux de la Francophonie	Beirut, Lebanon	6th	3000 m s-chase	9:01.47

== See also ==
- Athletics New Brunswick
