= Godfrey Siamusiye =

Zambian athlete

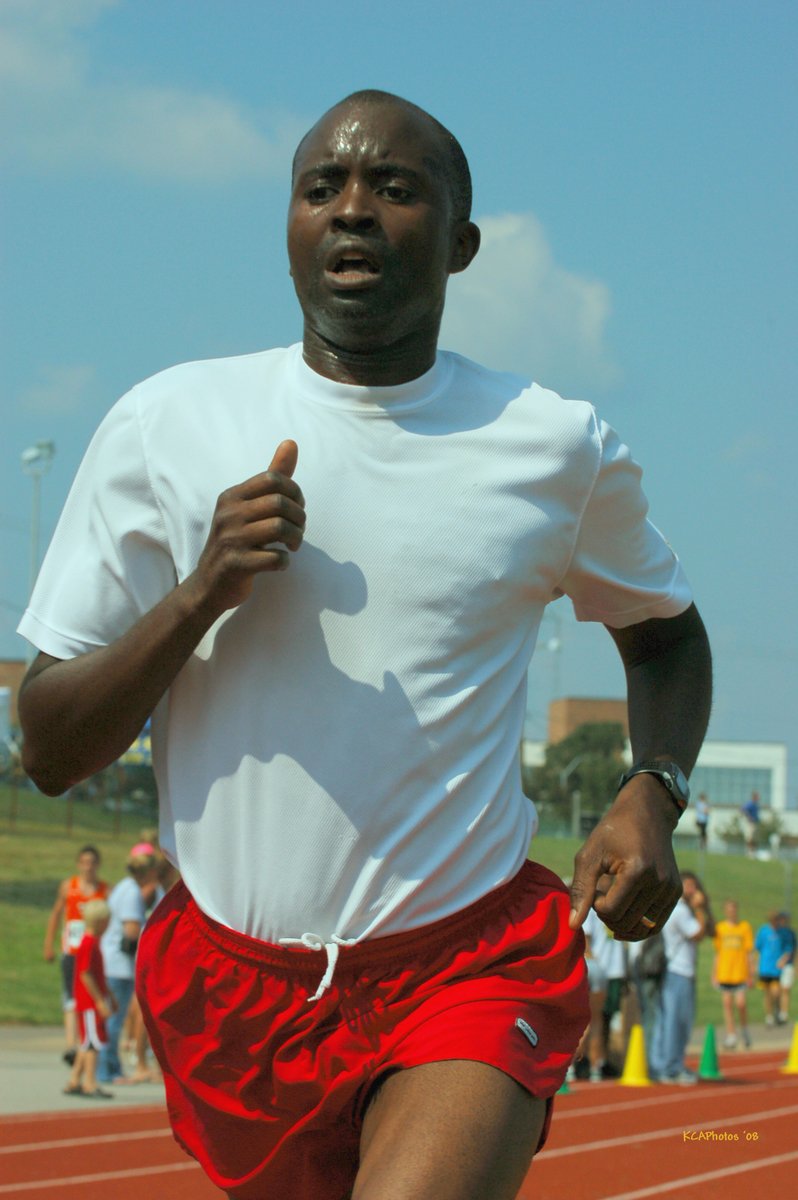

Personal information
- Nationality: Zambian
- Born: 23 September 1972 (age 53) Choma, Zambia
- Height: 175 cm (5 ft 9 in)
- Weight: 62 kg (137 lb)

Sport
- Sport: Athletics
- Event: Steeplechase
- Club: Arkansas Razorbacks

Godfrey Malumo Siamusiye (born September 23, 1972) is a cross country and track and field runner from Choma, Zambia. He has competed in the Olympics in 1992 and 1996. He was also NCAA Division I Cross Country National Champion in 1995 and 1996. He was a member of the 1995 Arkansas Razorback cross country National Champion team. He coached from 2006 to 2012 as the head cross country coach at Shiloh Christian School in Springdale, Arkansas. In 2012, Siamusiye left Shiloh for the position of cross country coach at Springdale High School.

== College career ==
=== Blinn College ===
Godfrey Siamusiye attended Blinn College, located in Brenham, Texas, in 1993 and 1994. In 1990s Godfrey was an All-American in 4 different events: Cross Country, 3000m, 3000m Steeplechase, and the 5000m. In 1994 Siamusiye was the NJCAA Division I cross country National Champion, competing the 8k course in 26:10.80 in addition to being an All-American in 6 events: Cross Country, the Mile, 3000m, 3000m steeplechase, 5000m and 10000m.

=== University of Arkansas ===
Godfrey Siamusiye excelled during his two years at the University of Arkansas under legendary coach John McDonnell. He was an All-American on six occasions, and won four National Championships. In cross country, he won the national championship both years at the school. He was inducted into the Arkansas Track and Field Hall of Fame in 2008. In the 1995 championship, hosted by Iowa State in Ames, Iowa, he finished in 30:09, nearly a minute ahead of the next competitor, and led the Razorbacks to a National Championship. In 1996 he repeated as cross country National Champion, completing the Tucson, Arizona course in 29:49. In 1996 Godfrey finished 2nd in the 5000 meters at the NCAA championships hosted by the University of Oregon at Hayward Field. That year, he was nominated for Southeastern Conference athlete of the year for his performance in track and field. "Godfrey Siamusiye was probably the greatest distance runner in Razorback history." said Rick Schaeffer, who put the runner at #14 on his 2005 list of the best Razorbacks in any sport in history.

14. Godfrey Siamusiye - who only ran two years or would have been ranked higher. He was an incredible distance runner and one of only two Razorbacks to win the individual championship at the NCAA cross country meet.

== Olympics ==
Godfrey Siamusiye
Medal record

Men's Track and Field

Representing Zambia

Olympic Games 1992 Barcelona 5000m 1996 Atlanta 3000m Steeplechase

=== 1992 Barcelona ===
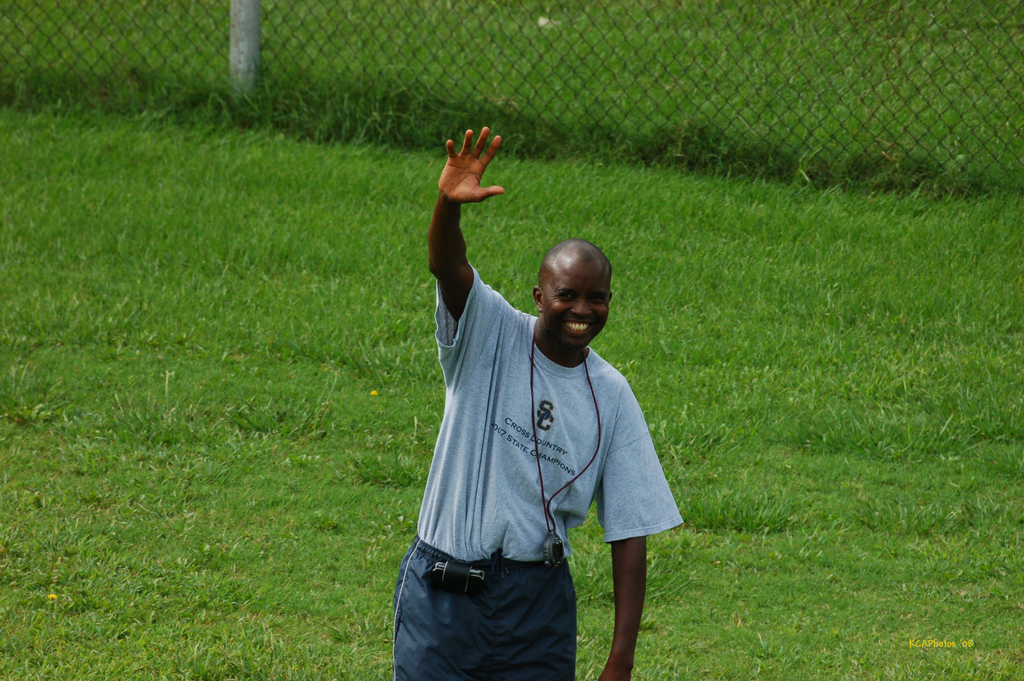

Godfrey Siamusiye represented Zambia for the first time at the 1992 Olympics in Barcelona. He competed in the 5000 meters. He finished 11th in the first of four heats in round one and did not qualify for the finals.

Round	Heat	Time	Place
One	1	14:08.83	11

=== 1996 Atlanta ===
Godfrey Siamusiye returned to the Olympics in 1996 where he competed in the 3000 meter steeplechase. In the first found, he finished in 8 minutes and 30 seconds, less than a quarter second behind Kenyan Joseph Keter who went on to win the gold medal. In the semi-finals, He ran a time of 8:37.41 and did not advance to the finals, finishing 10th.

Round	Heat	Time	Place
One	1	8:30.56	2
Semi-Finals	1	8:37.41	10

== Coaching career ==
Godfrey Siamusiye had his first coaching job as Head Cross Country Coach and assistant track and field coach at Shiloh Christian School in Springdale, Arkansas. He first came to Shiloh in 2006 as a volunteer head coach for cross country. In 2007, his second year, he led the Shiloh Saints to first ever State Championship in Cross Country, winning the class AAA title. His 2008 team had many key returners from the 2007 championship. However, Heber Springs beat the Saints by one point for the Arkansas class 4A State Championship in 2008. Godfrey Siamusiye's 2008 Saints had four runners make All-State. In 2009 he picked up his second and third state championships as the boys team won by a large margin taking the first, second, third, and fifth individual spots, and the girls team won in a close race.

In 2012, Siamusiye left Shiloh for the position of cross country coach at Springdale High School.
