= Mark Ostendarp =

German distance runner

Personal information
- Born: 24 January 1973 (age 53) Coesfeld, North Rhine-Westphalia, West Germany

Sport
- Sport: Track and field
Medal record
Representing Germany
Summer Universiade
Gold medal – first place	1997 Catania	3000m steeplechase

Mark Ostendarp (born 24 January 1973) is a retired German runner, who specialized in the 3000 metres steeplechase.

Ostendarp won the 1997 Summer Universiade, finished ninth at the 1997 World Championships and at the 1998 European Championships. At the 1998 IAAF World Cup he ran the 1500 metres and finished sixth.

He became German steeplechase champion in 1997, representing the team TV Wattenscheid.

His time of 8:18.49 minutes from the 1997 World Championships in Athens remained his career best time. This result places him ninth on the German all-time performers list, behind Damian Kallabis, Hagen Melzer, Frank Baumgartl, Rainer Schwarz, Uwe Pflügner, Michael Karst, Steffen Brand and Patriz Ilg.
