= Mark Croghan =

American track and field athlete

Personal information
- Born: Mark Duane Croghan; January 8, 1968 (age 58) Akron, Ohio, U.S.
- Height: 5 ft 8.5 in (1.740 m)
- Weight: 132 lb (60 kg)

Sport
- Country: United States
- Events: Steeplechase, 1500 m, 3000 m, 5000 m
- College team: Ohio State Buckeyes
- Turned pro: 1991
- Retired: 2001

Achievements and titles
- Personal bests: 1500 m: 3:39.34; Steeplechase: 8:09.76

Mark Duane Croghan (born January 8, 1968) is an American former track and field athlete, who mainly competed in the men's 3000 metres steeplechase. He is a three-time Olympian and five-time US national champion in the steeplechase (1991, 1994–97).

== Career ==
Born in Green, Ohio, Croghan attended Ohio State University. His first major competition was the 1991 World Championships. With 15 to qualify for the final, he narrowly missed out by just 0.64 of a second. At his first Olympics in 1992, with 12 qualifying for the final, he again narrowly missed out as he was the 13th fastest overall in the semifinals. His best international results were 5th-place finishes at the 1993 World Championships in Stuttgart (in a PB of 8:09.76), and at the 1996 Olympic Games in Atlanta. He also finished 6th at the 1997 World Championships. At his third Olympics in 2000, he again failed to reach the final by just one place, missing out by 0.53 of second.

Croghan served as an assistant coach at University School, a High school in Hunting Valley, Ohio from 2001-06. He also served as the distance coach for the Ohio State men's and women's track programs from 1991-93. Under his guidance, Robert Gary earned All-America status three times and qualified for the 1996 Olympics in Atlanta. In 2007, he was appointed head cross-country coach and assistant track coach at Kent State University.

== Honors ==
- 1999 Ohio State University Hall of Fame inductee.
- 2007 Ohio Association of Cross Country Coaches Hall of Fame inductee.
- 2009 Summit County Hall of Fame inductee.

== International competitions ==
| Year | Competition | Venue | Position | Notes |
|---|---|---|---|---|
| 1990 | Goodwill Games | Seattle, United States | 4th | 8:35.60 |
| 1991 | World Championships | Tokyo, Japan | 16th (h) | 8:29.20 |
| 1992 | Olympic Games | Barcelona, Spain | 13th (s) | 8:30.15 |
| 1993 | World Championships | Stuttgart, Germany | 5th | 8:09.76 |
| 1994 | Goodwill Games | Saint Petersburg, Russia | 2nd | 8:21.85 |
| 1995 | World Championships | Gothenburg, Sweden | DNF (s) | 8:26.02 (h) |
| 1996 | Olympic Games | Atlanta, Georgia | 5th | 8:17.84 |
| 1997 | World Championships | Athens, Greece | 6th | 8:14.09 |
| 2000 | Olympic Games | Sydney, Australia | 16th (h) | 8:25.88 |

Notes:

- (#) Indicates overall position achieved in the semis (s) or heats (h).
- Croghan did not finish (DNF) his semifinal (s) at the 1995 World Championships after falling twice.
