= Steffen Brand =

German middle-distance runner

Personal information
- Born: 10 March 1965 (age 61) Recklinghausen, West Germany

Sport
- Sport: Track and field

Steffen Brand (born 10 March 1965) is a retired German runner who specialized in the 3000 metres steeplechase.

His personal best time is 8:14.37 minutes, achieved at the 1995 World Championships in Gothenburg. This result places him seventh on the German all-time performers list, behind Damian Kallabis, Hagen Melzer, Frank Baumgartl, Rainer Schwarz, Uwe Pflügner and Michael Karst.

He competed for the sports clubs TV Wattenscheid 01 (1985–1993) and LG Bayer Leverkusen (1994-) during his active career.

== Achievements ==
Year	Competition	Venue	Position	Event	Notes
Representing West Germany
1990	European Indoor Championships	Glasgow, Scotland	4th	1500 m	3:45.58
1990	European Championships	Split, Yugoslavia	27th (h)	5000m	14:12.84
Representing Germany
1992	Olympic Games	Barcelona, Spain	5th	3000 m s'chase	8:16.60
1993	World Championships	Stuttgart, Germany	6th	3000 m s'chase	8:15.33
1995	World Championships	Gothenburg, Sweden	4th	3000 m s'chase	8:14.37 PB
1996	Olympic Games	Atlanta, United States	6th	3000 m s'chase	8:18.52
