= Kim Bauermeister =

German runner (born 1970)

Personal information
- National team: Germany
- Citizenship: Germany
- Born: November 20, 1970 (age 55) Stuttgart, Germany
- Years active: 1989–1996

Kim Bauermeister (born 20 November 1970 in Stuttgart) is a German retired runner who specialized in the 3000 metres steeplechase.

He won the bronze medal at the 1989 European Junior Championships and the gold medal in 3000 metres at the 1994 European Indoor Championships. He competed at the World Championships in 1993 and 1995 as well as the 1996 Summer Olympics without reaching the finals.

His personal best time is 8:23.19 minutes, achieved in August 1994 in Berlin.

He won one national silver medal in steeplechase, in 1994.
