= Vladimir Golyas =

Russian middle-distance runner

Personal information
- Full name: Vladimir Konstantinovich Golyas
- Nationality: Russian
- Born: 25 January 1971 (age 54) Zarechny, Penza Oblast, Soviet Union

Sport
- Sport: Middle-distance running
- Event: Steeplechase

Vladimir Konstantinovich Golyas (born 25 January 1971) is a Russian middle-distance runner. He competed in the 3000 metres steeplechase at the 1992 Summer Olympics and the 1996 Summer Olympics.
