= Michael Buchleitner =

Austrian long-distance runner

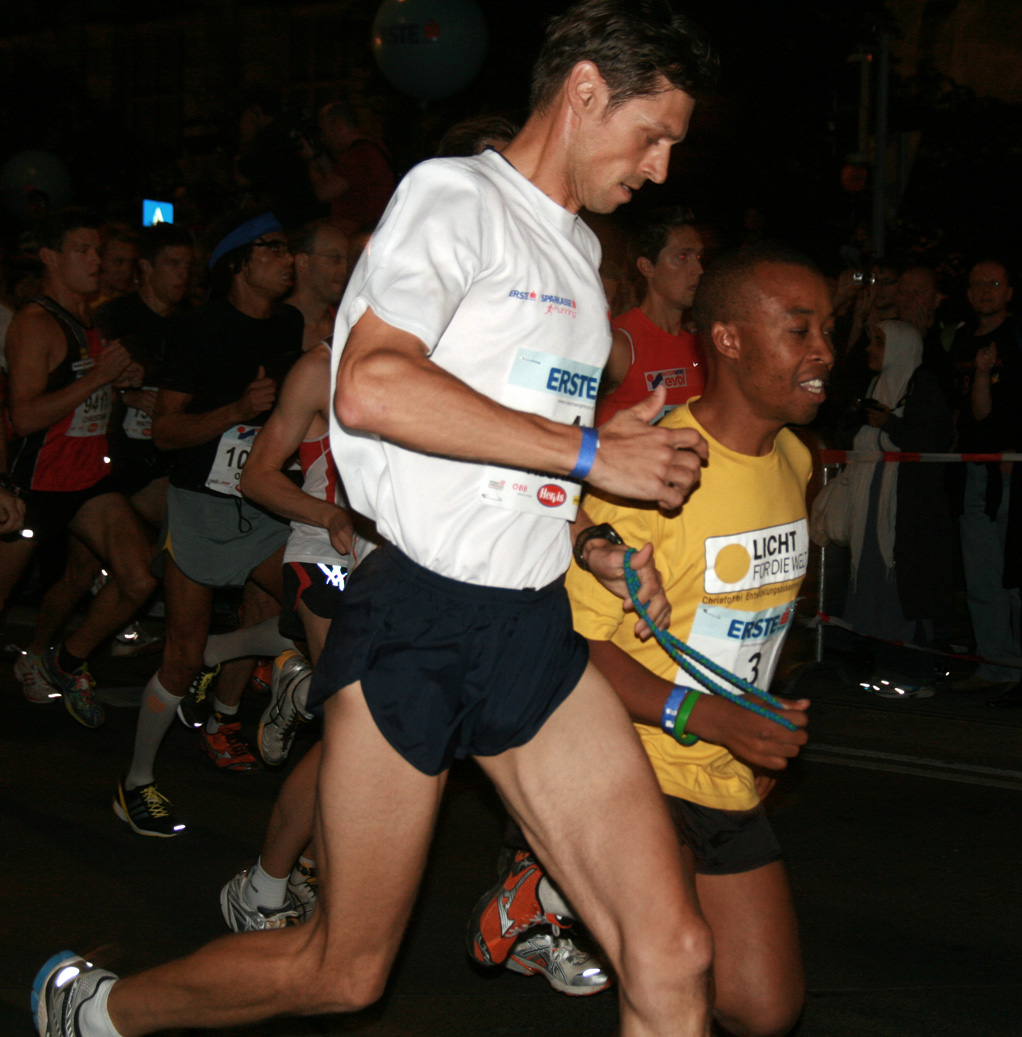
- Henry Wanyoike, Michael Buchleitner, Vienna Night Run 2009

Personal information
- Born: 14 October 1969 (age 56) Mödling, Austria

Sport
- Sport: Track and field
Medal record
Representing Austria
Summer Universiade
Gold medal – first place	1993 Buffalo	3000 m steeplechase
Bronze medal – third place	1997 Catania	3000 m steeplechase

Michael Buchleitner (born 14 October 1969) is an Austrian long-distance runner.

Up to 1999 he specialized in the 3000 metres steeplechase. He finished tenth at the 1993 World Championships and competed without reaching the final in 1997 and 1999. He did, however, achieve a personal best time of 8:20.04 minutes at the latter event. Competing at the Universiade he won a gold medal in 1993 and a bronze in 1997. He also finished fifth in 3000 metres at the 2002 European Indoor Athletics Championships.

From 2000 he has concentrated on the marathon race. He competed in this event at the 2000 and 2004 Summer Olympics.

He married Ellen Kiessling, a German champion middle-distance runner, in 1994.

== International competitions ==
Year	Competition	Venue	Position	Event	Notes
Representing Austria
1988	World Junior Championships	Sudbury, Canada	18th (h)	3000m steeplechase	9:18.29
1994	European Championships	Helsinki, Finland	13th (h)	3000m steeplechase	8:33.90
2000	Olympic Games	Sydney, Australia	33rd	Marathon	2:19:26
2004	Olympic Games	Athens, Greece	29th	Marathon	2:19:19

== Personal bests ==
- 3000 metres steeplechase - 8:20.04 min (1999)
- 5000 metres - 13:42.15 min (2000)
- 10,000 metres - 28:18.58 min (2000)
- Half marathon - 1:02:39 hrs (2004)
- Marathon - 2:12:43 hrs (1999)
