= Damian Kallabis =

German steeplechase runner

Personal information
- Born: 10 June 1973 (age 53) Gliwice, Poland
Medal record
Men's athletics
Representing Germany
European Championships
Gold medal – first place	1998 Budapest	3000 m steeplechase
World Cup
Gold medal – first place	1998 Johannesburg	3000 m steeplechase

Damian Kallabis (born 10 June 1973 in Gliwice, Poland) is a retired German runner who specialized in the 3000 metres steeplechase.

Kallabis was an All-American runner for the UTEP Miners track and field team, placing 4th in the steeplechase at the 1997 NCAA Division I Outdoor Track and Field Championships.

In 1997 his personal best time was 8:37.35 minutes. The next year he sensationally won the European Championships, lowering his personal best time to 8:13.10 minutes. He then won the steeplechase event at the 1998 IAAF World Cup.

In August 1999 he ran in 8:09.48 minutes in Zurich, beating the old German record of Hagen Melzer. This German record still stands. He finished fourth at the World Championships the same year, and fifteenth at the 2000 Summer Olympics.

He became German steeplechase champion in 1998 and 2000, representing the team SCC Berlin. He later switched team to VfB Stuttgart.
