= Elisardo de la Torre =

Spanish middle-distance runner

Personal information
- Nationality: Spanish
- Born: 10 October 1971 (age 54) Marín, Pontevedra, Spain
- Height: 175 cm (5 ft 9 in)
- Weight: 65 kg (143 lb)

Sport
- Sport: Middle-distance running
- Event: Steeplechase

Elisardo de la Torre (born 10 October 1971) is a Spanish middle-distance runner. He competed in the men's 3000 metres steeplechase at the 1996 Summer Olympics.
