= Vítor Almeida (runner) =

Portuguese middle-distance runner

Personal information
- Nationality: Portuguese
- Born: 6 March 1970 (age 56) Luanda, Angola

Sport
- Sport: Middle-distance running
- Event: Steeplechase

Vítor Almeida (born 6 March 1970) is a Portuguese middle-distance runner. He competed in the men's 3000 metres steeplechase at the 1996 Summer Olympics.
