= 1973 Central American and Caribbean Championships in Athletics – Results =

These are the partial results of the 1973 Central American and Caribbean Championships in Athletics which took place between July 26 and 29, 1973 in Maracaibo, Venezuela.

== Men's results ==
=== 100 meters ===
Heats – July 26

Rank	Heat	Name	Nationality	Time	Notes
1	1	José Triana	Cuba	10.3	Q
2	1	Eric Padilla	Puerto Rico	10.4	Q
3	1	Donato Vásquez	Dominican Republic	10.4	
1	2	Carl Lawson	Jamaica	10.2	Q
2	2	Hermes Ramírez	Cuba	10.3	Q
3	2	Guillermo González	Puerto Rico	10.4	
1	3	Don Quarrie	Jamaica	10.3	Q
2	3	Calvin Dill	Bermuda	10.3	Q
4	3	Jesús Rico	Venezuela	10.3	q

Final – July 26

Rank	Name	Nationality	Time	Notes
1st place, gold medalist(s)	Don Quarrie	Jamaica	10.2	=CR
2nd place, silver medalist(s)	José Triana	Cuba	10.2	
3rd place, bronze medalist(s)	Carl Lawson	Jamaica	10.2	
4	Jesús Rico	Venezuela	10.4	
5	Calvin Dill	Bermuda	10.4	
6	Hermes Ramírez	Cuba	10.4	

=== 200 meters ===
July 28
Wind: +4.1 m/s

Rank	Name	Nationality	Time	Notes
1st place, gold medalist(s)	Don Quarrie	Jamaica	20.1	
2nd place, silver medalist(s)	Silvio Leonard	Cuba	20.3	
3rd place, bronze medalist(s)	Pablo Bandomo	Cuba	20.4	
4	Guillermo González	Puerto Rico	20.5	
5	Calvin Dill	Bermuda	20.7	
6	Erick Phillips	Venezuela	20.8	
7	Richard Hardware	Jamaica	20.9	
8	Arquimedes Mina	Colombia	21.0	

=== 400 meters ===
Heats – July 26

Rank	Heat	Name	Nationality	Time	Notes
1	1	Alberto Juantorena	Cuba	45.8	Q
2	1	Pedro Ferrer	Puerto Rico	47.1	Q
1	2	Kim Rowe	Jamaica	46.7	Q
2	2	Erick Phillips	Venezuela	47.1	Q
1	3	Víctor Patínez	Venezuela	47.1	Q
2	3	Eddy Gutiérrez	Cuba	47.5	Q

Final – July 27

Rank	Name	Nationality	Time	Notes
1st place, gold medalist(s)	Alberto Juantorena	Cuba	46.4	CR
2nd place, silver medalist(s)	Pedro Ferrer	Puerto Rico	46.6	
3rd place, bronze medalist(s)	Víctor Patínez	Venezuela	47.2	
4	Erick Phillips	Venezuela	47.5	
5	Kim Rowe	Jamaica	47.5	
6	Eddy Gutiérrez	Cuba	47.6	

=== 800 meters ===
Heats – July 26

Rank	Heat	Name	Nationality	Time	Notes
1	1	Leandro Civil	Cuba	1:50.5	Q
2	1	Gilberto Gamillo	Mexico	1:50.7	Q
1	2	Leotulfo Jiménez	Venezuela	1:51.6	Q
2	2	Carlos Martínez	Mexico	1:51.8	Q

Final – July 27

Rank	Name	Nationality	Time	Notes
1st place, gold medalist(s)	Leandro Civil	Cuba	1:49.8	
2nd place, silver medalist(s)	Luis Medina	Cuba	1:49.8	
3rd place, bronze medalist(s)	Leotulfo Jiménez	Venezuela	1:50.7	
4	Carlos Báez	Puerto Rico	1:50.8	
5	Carlos Martínez	Mexico	1:51.1	
6	Modesto Comprés	Dominican Republic	1:51.6	

=== 1500 meters ===
July 29

Rank	Name	Nationality	Time	Notes
1st place, gold medalist(s)	Antonio Colón	Puerto Rico	3:45.9	CR
2nd place, silver medalist(s)	Jesús Barrero	Colombia	3:47.2	
3rd place, bronze medalist(s)	Carlos Báez	Puerto Rico	3:47.6	
4	Mario Pérez	Mexico	3:48.9	
5	José Antonio Bordón	Cuba	3:50.0	
6	José González Tiapa	Venezuela	3:50.4	
7	Modesto Comprés	Dominican Republic	?	
8	Luis Romero	Venezuela	?	

=== 5000 meters ===
July 27

Rank	Name	Nationality	Time	Notes
1st place, gold medalist(s)	Víctor Mora	Colombia	14:04.2	CR
2nd place, silver medalist(s)	Mario Pérez	Mexico	14:06.8	
3rd place, bronze medalist(s)	Rafael Palomares	Mexico	14:19.6	
4	Jairo Correa	Colombia	14:23.8	
5	Antonio Colón	Puerto Rico	14:29.3	
6	José Antonio Bordón	Cuba	14:30.1	

=== 10,000 meters ===
July 26

Rank	Name	Nationality	Time	Notes
1st place, gold medalist(s)	Víctor Mora	Colombia	29:56.4	CR
2nd place, silver medalist(s)	Pedro Miranda	Mexico	29:56.6	
3rd place, bronze medalist(s)	Luis Haro	Mexico	29:58.2	
4	Jairo Correa	Colombia	30:26.6	
5	Sadot Méndez	Puerto Rico	31:31.0	
6	Chuc Manuel	Cuba	32:00.9	
7	Víctor Serrano	Puerto Rico	?	
8	Antonio Blanco	Venezuela	?	
9	Emilio Rodríguez	Cuba	?	
10	Oswaldo Mosquera	Venezuela	?	
11	Rolando Durán	Dominican Republic	?	

=== Half marathon ===
July 29

Rank	Name	Nationality	Time	Notes
1st place, gold medalist(s)	Mario Cuevas	Mexico	1:05:07	CR
2nd place, silver medalist(s)	Martín Pabón	Colombia	1:05:56	
3rd place, bronze medalist(s)	Santiago Barón	Colombia	1:06:10	
4	Sadot Méndez	Puerto Rico	1:07:32	
5	Andrés Romero	Mexico	1:08:05	
6	Emilio Rodríguez	Cuba	1:10:20	
7	Antonio Blanco	Venezuela	1:11:26	
8	Juan Medina	Venezuela	1:12:48	
9	Gary Wilkinson	Bermuda	1:16:36	
10	Raymond Swan	Bermuda	1:17:46	
11	Víctor Rodríguez	Dominican Republic	1:18:41	
12	José Castillo	Dominican Republic	1:20:14	

=== 110 meters hurdles ===
July 28
Wind: +3.9 m/s

Rank	Name	Nationality	Time	Notes
1st place, gold medalist(s)	Juan Morales	Cuba	13.7	
2nd place, silver medalist(s)	Guillermo Núñez	Cuba	13.8	
3rd place, bronze medalist(s)	Enrique Rendón	Venezuela	14.4	
4	Julio Ferrer	Puerto Rico	14.4	
5	Anthony Spencer	Trinidad and Tobago	14.6	
6	Clive Barriffe	Jamaica	14.7	

=== 400 meters hurdles ===
July 27

Rank	Name	Nationality	Time	Notes
1st place, gold medalist(s)	Julio Ferrer	Puerto Rico	51.9	CR
2nd place, silver medalist(s)	Fabio Zúñiga	Colombia	52.0	
3rd place, bronze medalist(s)	Juan García	Cuba	53.1	
4	Eulogio Robles	Cuba	53.9	
5	J. Toledo	Venezuela	54.4	
6	José Luis Santiago	Puerto Rico	54.6	

=== 3000 meters steeplechase ===
July 28

Rank	Name	Nationality	Time	Notes
1st place, gold medalist(s)	Antonio Villanueva	Mexico	8:49.4	CR
2nd place, silver medalist(s)	Rigoberto Mendoza	Cuba	8:52.6	
3rd place, bronze medalist(s)	Víctor Mora	Colombia	8:58.2	
4	Carlos Báez	Puerto Rico	9:05.1	
5	Lucirio Garrido	Venezuela	9:08.7	
6	Luis Haro	Mexico	9:15.1	

=== 4 × 100 meters relay ===
July 29

Rank	Nation	Athletes	Time	Notes
1st place, gold medalist(s)	Jamaica	Carl Lawson, Richard Hardware, Overton Spencer, Don Quarrie	39.9	
2nd place, silver medalist(s)	Cuba	Silvio Leonard, Juan Morales, Hermes Ramírez, José Triana	40.2	
3rd place, bronze medalist(s)	Trinidad and Tobago	Christopher Brathwaite, George Swanston, Herman Marchand, Bertram Lovell	41.1	
4	Puerto Rico		41.2	
5	Dominican Republic		41.5	
6	Venezuela		41.8	

=== 4 × 400 meters relay ===
July 29

Rank	Nation	Athletes	Time	Notes
1st place, gold medalist(s)	Jamaica	Trevor Campbell, Richard Hardware, Seymour Newman, Kim Rowe	3:09.4	
2nd place, silver medalist(s)	Cuba	Eddy Gutiérrez, Antonio Álvarez, Leandro Civil, Alberto Juantorena	3:10.1	
3rd place, bronze medalist(s)	Venezuela	Raúl Dome, Víctor Patíñez, Erick Phillips, José Toledo	3:10.4	
4	Trinidad and Tobago		3:16.0	
5	Dominican Republic		3:21.6	

=== High jump ===
July 29

Rank	Name	Nationality	Result	Notes
1st place, gold medalist(s)	Richard Spencer	Cuba	2.06	CR
2nd place, silver medalist(s)	Amado Olaguiber	Cuba	2.03	
3rd place, bronze medalist(s)	Pedro Yequez	Venezuela	2.03	
4	Luis Cruz	Puerto Rico	2.03	
5	G. Cepeda	Puerto Rico	2.00	
6	W. Robinson	Jamaica	1.95	

=== Pole vault ===
July 28

Rank	Name	Nationality	Result	Notes
1st place, gold medalist(s)	Jorge Palacios	Cuba	4.85	CR
2nd place, silver medalist(s)	Roberto Moré	Cuba	4.85	
3rd place, bronze medalist(s)	Ciro Valdés	Colombia	4.60	
4	Jorge Miranda	Puerto Rico	4.50	

=== Long jump ===
July 26

Rank	Name	Nationality	Result	Notes
1st place, gold medalist(s)	Milán Matos	Cuba	7.68	CR
2nd place, silver medalist(s)	Efraín Malberty	Cuba	7.34	
3rd place, bronze medalist(s)	Wilfredo Maisonave	Puerto Rico	7.28	
4	Anthony Joseph	Trinidad and Tobago	7.26	
5	George Swanston	Trinidad and Tobago	7.25	

=== Triple jump ===
July 28

Rank	Name	Nationality	Result	Notes
1st place, gold medalist(s)	Juvenal Pérez	Cuba	15.79	
2nd place, silver medalist(s)	Gerry Swan	Bermuda	15.57	
3rd place, bronze medalist(s)	Edgar Moreno	Venezuela	15.56	
4	Juan Velázquez	Cuba	15.48	
5	W. Robinson	Jamaica	15.38	
6	Wilfredo Maisonave	Puerto Rico	15.17	

=== Shot put ===
July 27

Rank	Name	Nationality	Result	Notes
1st place, gold medalist(s)	José Carreño	Venezuela	15.94	
2nd place, silver medalist(s)	Benigno Hodelín	Cuba	15.78	
3rd place, bronze medalist(s)	Silván Hemming	Cuba	15.72	
4	Pedro Serrano	Puerto Rico	15.24	
5	Jesús Laya	Venezuela	15.56	
6	Roberto Pérez	Puerto Rico	13.58	

=== Discus throw ===
July 26

Rank	Name	Nationality	Result	Notes
1st place, gold medalist(s)	Julián Morrinson	Cuba	57.58	CR
2nd place, silver medalist(s)	Javier Moreno	Cuba	53.86	
3rd place, bronze medalist(s)	Ignacio Reinosa	Puerto Rico	49.12	
4	Roberto Pérez	Puerto Rico	45.26	
5	Julio Alexander	Venezuela	43.48	

=== Hammer throw ===
July 29

Rank	Name	Nationality	Result	Notes
1st place, gold medalist(s)	Víctor Suárez	Cuba	62.50	
2nd place, silver medalist(s)	William Silén	Puerto Rico	61.12	
3rd place, bronze medalist(s)	Pedro Garbey	Cuba	59.08	
4	Marcos Borregales	Venezuela	51.56	
5	Pelayo Quintana	Venezuela	50.62	
6	E. Axminson	Jamaica	48.82	

=== Javelin throw ===
July 28

Rank	Name	Nationality	Result	Notes
1st place, gold medalist(s)	Raúl Fernández	Cuba	74.90	
2nd place, silver medalist(s)	Amado Morales	Puerto Rico	70.94	
3rd place, bronze medalist(s)	Héctor Vinent	Cuba	70.24	
4	Salomon Robbins	Mexico	69.26	
5	Ramón Rodríguez	Venezuela	62.92	
6	M. González	Venezuela	62.92	

=== Decathlon ===
July 28–29

Rank	Athlete	Nationality	100m	LJ	SP	HJ	400m	110m H	DT	PV	JT	1500m	Points	Notes
1st place, gold medalist(s)	Jesús Mirabal	Cuba	10.5	6.56	13.22	1.80	50.4	14.1	38.40	4.05	61.08	5:19.1	7315	
2nd place, silver medalist(s)	Rigoberto Salazar	Cuba	11.0	6.95	12.04	1.90	51.9	15.5	39.75	3.60	61.40	5:07.2	7035	
3rd place, bronze medalist(s)	Celso Aragón	Colombia											6841	
4	Ramón Montezuma	Venezuela											6106	

== Women's results ==
=== 100 meters ===
July 26

Rank	Name	Nationality	Time	Notes
1st place, gold medalist(s)	Silvia Chivás	Cuba	11.4	CR
2nd place, silver medalist(s)	Carmen Valdés	Cuba	11.6	
3rd place, bronze medalist(s)	Laura Pierre	Trinidad and Tobago	11.9	
4	Debbie Jones	Bermuda	12.0	
5	Elsa Antúnez	Venezuela	12.1	
6	Marcia Trotman	Barbados	12.1	

=== 200 meters ===
July 27
Wind: +2.9 m/s

Rank	Name	Nationality	Time	Notes
1st place, gold medalist(s)	Silvia Chivás	Cuba	23.5	
2nd place, silver medalist(s)	Asunción Acosta	Cuba	23.9	
3rd place, bronze medalist(s)	Ruth Williams	Jamaica	23.9	
4	Lorna Forde	Barbados	24.1	
5	Debbie Jones	Bermuda	24.7	
6	Elsa Antúnez	Venezuela	24.9	

=== 400 meters ===
July 28

Rank	Name	Nationality	Time	Notes
1st place, gold medalist(s)	Aurelia Pentón	Cuba	53.5	=CR
2nd place, silver medalist(s)	Asunción Acosta	Cuba	53.7	
3rd place, bronze medalist(s)	Lorna Forde	Barbados	54.9	
4	Ruth Alexander	Trinidad and Tobago	55.7	
5	Zeneida de la Cruz	Dominican Republic	56.4	
6	Barbara Bishop	Barbados	57.7	

=== 800 meters ===
July 28

Rank	Name	Nationality	Time	Notes
1st place, gold medalist(s)	Charlotte Bradley	Mexico	2:05.8	CR
2nd place, silver medalist(s)	Zeneida de la Cruz	Dominican Republic	2:06.9	
3rd place, bronze medalist(s)	Enriqueta Nava	Mexico	2:07.7	
4	Aurelia Pentón	Cuba	2:09.1	
5	Carmen Trustée	Cuba	2:16.1	

=== 1500 meters ===
July 29

Rank	Name	Nationality	Time	Notes
1st place, gold medalist(s)	Enriqueta Nava	Mexico	4:26.3	CR
2nd place, silver medalist(s)	Charlotte Bradley	Mexico	4:35.1	
3rd place, bronze medalist(s)	Melquises Fonseca	Cuba	4:37.3	
4	Zeneida de la Cruz	Dominican Republic	4:40.3	

=== 100 meters hurdles ===
July 28

Rank	Name	Nationality	Time	Notes
1st place, gold medalist(s)	Marlene Elejalde	Cuba	13.9	
2nd place, silver medalist(s)	Andrea Bruce	Jamaica	14.4	
3rd place, bronze medalist(s)	Mercedes Román	Mexico	14.4	
4	Lourdes Jones	Cuba	14.4	

=== 200 meters hurdles ===
July 27

Rank	Name	Nationality	Time	Notes
1st place, gold medalist(s)	Marlene Elejalde	Cuba	28.0w	
2nd place, silver medalist(s)	Raquel Martínez	Cuba	29.1w	
3rd place, bronze medalist(s)	Alix Castillo	Venezuela	30.7w	

=== 4 × 100 meters relay ===
July 29

Rank	Nation	Athletes	Time	Notes
1st place, gold medalist(s)	Cuba	Marlene Elejalde, Carmen Valdés, Fulgencia Romay, Silvia Chivás	45.9	
2nd place, silver medalist(s)	Jamaica	Andrea Bruce, Yvonne White, Regina Montague, Poretay Scott	48.4	
3rd place, bronze medalist(s)	Netherlands Antilles	Shareen Ruimveld, Grace Lynch, Maurina Maduro, Edwina Leonara	48.6	
4	Venezuela		49.3	
5	Barbados		49.4	

=== 4 × 400 meters relay ===
July 29

Rank	Nation	Athletes	Time	Notes
1st place, gold medalist(s)	Cuba	Aurelia Pentón, Ela Cabrejas, Asunción Acosta, Carmen Trustée	3:42.1	
2nd place, silver medalist(s)	Barbados	Barbara Bishop, Lorna Forde, Heather Gooding, Marcia Trotman	3:51.0	
3rd place, bronze medalist(s)	Mexico	Mercedes Román, Charlotte Bradley, Enriqueta Nava, Guadaloupe Vizcaya	3:56.9	
4	Trinidad and Tobago		3:58.9	
5	Venezuela		4:05.9	

=== High jump ===
July 26

Rank	Name	Nationality	Result	Notes
1st place, gold medalist(s)	Andrea Bruce	Jamaica	1.71	
2nd place, silver medalist(s)	Marima Rodríguez	Cuba	1.69	
3rd place, bronze medalist(s)	Angela Carbonell	Cuba	1.67	
4	Marlene Bascombe	Barbados	1.55	

=== Long jump ===
July 26

Rank	Name	Nationality	Result	Notes
1st place, gold medalist(s)	Marcia Garbey	Cuba	6.04	
2nd place, silver medalist(s)	Ana Alexander	Cuba	6.02	
3rd place, bronze medalist(s)	Ana Maquilón	Colombia	5.46	
4	P. Brewster	Barbados	5.24	
5	V. Rincón	Venezuela	5.12	

=== Shot put ===
July 26

Rank	Name	Nationality	Result	Notes
1st place, gold medalist(s)	Hilda Ramírez	Cuba	14.28	CR
2nd place, silver medalist(s)	Celeste Kindelán	Cuba	14.02	
3rd place, bronze medalist(s)	Patricia Andrus	Venezuela	12.88	
4	Dora Vásquez	Colombia	12.60	

=== Discus throw ===
Rank	Name	Nationality	Result	Notes
1st place, gold medalist(s)	Carmen Romero	Cuba	52.46	
2nd place, silver medalist(s)	María Cristina Betancourt	Cuba	47.92	
3rd place, bronze medalist(s)	Patricia Andrus	Venezuela	39.88	

=== Javelin throw ===
July 27

Rank	Name	Nationality	Result	Notes
1st place, gold medalist(s)	Tomasa Núñez	Cuba	51.62	
2nd place, silver medalist(s)	Milagros Bayard	Cuba	47.04	
3rd place, bronze medalist(s)	Gladys González	Venezuela	45.52	
4	A. Baldo	Mexico	42.90	
5	Ivelisse Gómez	Dominican Republic	39.44	

=== Pentathlon ===
July 27

Rank	Athlete	Nationality	100m H	SP	HJ	LJ	200m	Points	Notes
1st place, gold medalist(s)	Lucía Duquet	Cuba	14.6	7.68	1.71	5.83	25.8	3807	
2nd place, silver medalist(s)	Mercedes Román	Mexico						3729	
3rd place, bronze medalist(s)	Angela Carbonell	Cuba						3629	
