= 1973 Central American and Caribbean Championships in Athletics =

- Dates: 26–29 July
- Host city: Maracaibo, Venezuela
- Venue: Estadio José Pachencho Romero

The 1973 Central American and Caribbean Championships in Athletics were held at the Estadio José Pachencho Romero in Maracaibo, Venezuela between 26–29 July.

== Medal summary ==
=== Men's events ===
| Event | Gold | | Silver | | Bronze | |
|---|---|---|---|---|---|---|
| 100 metres | Don Quarrie; Jamaica | 10.2 =CR | José Triana; Cuba | 10.2 | Carl Lawson; Jamaica | 10.2 |
| 200 metres (wind: +4.1 m/s) | Don Quarrie; Jamaica | 20.1w | Silvio Leonard; Cuba | 20.3w | Pablo Bandomo; Cuba | 20.4w |
| 400 metres | Alberto Juantorena; Cuba | 46.4 CR | Pedro Ferrer; Puerto Rico | 46.6 | Víctor Patínez; Venezuela | 47.2 |
| 800 metres | Leandro Civil; Cuba | 1:49.8 | Luis Medina; Cuba | 1:49.8 | Leotulfo Jiménez; Venezuela | 1:50.7 |
| 1500 metres | Antonio Colón; Puerto Rico | 3:45.9 CR | Jesús Barrero; Colombia | 3:47.2 | Carlos Báez; Puerto Rico | 3:47.6 |
| 5000 metres | Víctor Mora; Colombia | 14:04.2 CR | Mario Pérez; Mexico | 14:06.8 | Rafael Palomares; Mexico | 14:19.6 |
| 10,000 metres | Víctor Mora; Colombia | 29:56.4 CR | Pedro Miranda; Mexico | 29:56.6 | Luis Haro; Mexico | 29:58.2 |
| Half marathon | Mario Cuevas; Mexico | 1:05:07 CR | Martín Pabón; Colombia | 1:05:56 | Santiago Barón; Colombia | 1:06:10 |
| 110 metres hurdles (wind: +3.9 m/s) | Juan Morales; Cuba | 13.7w | Guillermo Núñez; Cuba | 13.8w | Enrique Rendón; Venezuela | 14.4w |
| 400 metres hurdles | Julio Ferrer; Puerto Rico | 51.9 CR | Fabio Zúñiga; Colombia | 52.0 | Juan García; Cuba | 53.1 |
| 3000 metres steeplechase | Antonio Villanueva; Mexico | 8:49.4 CR | Rigoberto Mendoza; Cuba | 8:52.6 | Víctor Mora; Colombia | 8:58.2 |
| 4 × 100 metres relay | Jamaica; Carl Lawson; Richard Hardware; Overton Spencer; Don Quarrie | 39.9 | Cuba; Silvio Leonard; Juan Morales; Hermes Ramírez; José Triana | 40.2 | Trinidad and Tobago; Christopher Brathwaite; George Swanston; Herman Marchand; Bertram Lovell | 41.1 |
| 4 × 400 metres relay | Jamaica; Trevor Campbell; Richard Hardware; Seymour Newman; Kim Rowe | 3:09.4 | Cuba; Eddy Gutiérrez; Antonio Álvarez; Leandro Civil; Alberto Juantorena | 3:10.1 | Venezuela; Raúl Dome; Víctor Patíñez; Erick Phillips; José Toledo | 3:10.4 |
| High jump | Richard Spencer; Cuba | 2.06 CR | Amado Olaguiber; Cuba | 2.03 | Pedro Yequez; Venezuela | 2.03 |
| Pole vault | Jorge Palacios; Cuba | 4.85 CR | Roberto Moré; Cuba | 4.85 | Ciro Valdés; Colombia | 4.60 |
| Long jump | Milán Matos; Cuba | 7.68 CR | Efraín Malberty; Cuba | 7.34 | Wilfredo Maisonave; Puerto Rico | 7.28 |
| Triple jump | Juvenal Pérez; Cuba | 15.79 | Gerry Swan; Bermuda | 15.57 | Edgar Moreno; Venezuela | 15.56 |
| Shot put | José Carreño; Venezuela | 15.94 | Benigno Hodelín; Cuba | 15.78 | Silván Hemming; Cuba | 15.72 |
| Discus throw | Julián Morrinson; Cuba | 57.58 CR | Javier Moreno; Cuba | 53.86 | Ignacio Reinosa; Puerto Rico | 49.12 |
| Hammer throw | Víctor Suárez; Cuba | 62.50 | William Silén; Puerto Rico | 61.12 | Pedro Garbey; Cuba | 59.08 |
| Javelin throw | Raúl Fernández; Cuba | 74.90 | Amado Morales; Puerto Rico | 70.94 | Héctor Vinent; Cuba | 70.24 |
| Decathlon | Jesús Mirabal; Cuba | 7315 CR | Rigoberto Salazar; Cuba | 7035 | Celso Aragón; Colombia | 6841 |

=== Women's events ===
| Event | Gold | | Silver | | Bronze | |
|---|---|---|---|---|---|---|
| 100 metres | Silvia Chivás; Cuba | 11.4 CR | Carmen Valdés; Cuba | 11.6 | Laura Pierre; Trinidad and Tobago | 11.9 |
| 200 metres (wind: +2.9 m/s) | Silvia Chivás; Cuba | 23.5w | Asunción Acosta; Cuba | 23.9w | Ruth Williams; Jamaica | 23.9w |
| 400 metres | Aurelia Pentón; Cuba | 53.5 =CR | Asunción Acosta; Cuba | 53.7 | Lorna Forde; Barbados | 54.9 |
| 800 metres | Charlotte Bradley; Mexico | 2:05.8 CR | Zeneida de la Cruz; Dominican Republic | 2:06.9 | Enriqueta Nava; Mexico | 2:07.7 |
| 1500 metres | Enriqueta Nava; Mexico | 4:26.3 CR | Charlotte Bradley; Mexico | 4:35.1 | Melquises Fonseca; Cuba | 4:37.3 |
| 100 metres hurdles | Marlene Elejalde; Cuba | 13.9 | Andrea Bruce; Jamaica | 14.4 | Mercedes Román; Mexico | 14.4 |
| 200 metres hurdles | Marlene Elejalde; Cuba | 28.0w | Raquel Martínez; Cuba | 29.1w | Alix Castillo; Venezuela | 30.7w |
| 4 × 100 metres relay | Cuba; Marlene Elejalde; Carmen Valdés; Fulgencia Romay; Silvia Chivás | 45.9 | Jamaica; Andrea Bruce; Yvonne White; Regina Montague; Poretay Scott | 48.4 | Netherlands Antilles; Shareen Ruimveld; Grace Lynch; Maurina Maduro; Edwina Leonara | 48.6 |
| 4 × 400 metres relay | Cuba; Aurelia Pentón; Ela Cabrejas; Asunción Acosta; Carmen Trustée | 3:42.1 | Barbados; Barbara Bishop; Lorna Forde; Heather Gooding; Marcia Trotman | 3:51.0 | Mexico; Mercedes Román; Charlotte Bradley; Enriqueta Nava; Guadaloupe Vizcaya | 3:56.9 |
| High jump | Andrea Bruce; Jamaica | 1.71 | Marima Rodríguez; Cuba | 1.69 | Angela Carbonell; Cuba | 1.67 |
| Long jump | Marcia Garbey; Cuba | 6.04 | Ana Alexander; Cuba | 6.02 | Ana Maquilón; Colombia | 5.46 |
| Shot put | Hilda Ramírez; Cuba | 14.28 CR | Celeste Kindelán; Cuba | 14.02 | Patricia Andrus; Venezuela | 12.88 |
| Discus throw | Carmen Romero; Cuba | 52.46 | María Cristina Betancourt; Cuba | 47.92 | Patricia Andrus; Venezuela | 39.88 |
| Javelin throw | Tomasa Núñez; Cuba | 51.62 | Milagros Bayard; Cuba | 47.04 | Gladys González; Venezuela | 45.52 |
| Pentathlon | Lucía Duquet; Cuba | 3807 | Mercedes Román; Mexico | 3729 | Angela Carbonell; Cuba | 3629 |

== Medal table ==
| Rank | Nation | Gold | Silver | Bronze | Total |
|---|---|---|---|---|---|
| 1 | Cuba | 23 | 22 | 8 | 53 |
| 2 | Jamaica | 5 | 2 | 2 | 9 |
| 3 | Mexico | 4 | 4 | 5 | 13 |
| 4 | Colombia | 2 | 3 | 5 | 10 |
| 5 | Puerto Rico | 2 | 3 | 3 | 8 |
| 6 | Venezuela | 1 | 0 | 10 | 11 |
| 7 | Barbados | 0 | 1 | 1 | 2 |
| 8 | Bermuda | 0 | 1 | 0 | 1 |
| 8 | Dominican Republic | 0 | 1 | 0 | 1 |
| 10 | Trinidad and Tobago | 0 | 0 | 2 | 2 |
| 11 | Netherlands Antilles | 0 | 0 | 1 | 1 |
| Totals (11 entries) | | 37 | 37 | 37 | 111 |
