= Athletics at the 1974 Central American and Caribbean Games – Results =

These are the official results of the athletics competition at the 1974 Central American and Caribbean Games which took place between 6 and 12 March 1974, at the Estadio Olímpico Juan Pablo Duarte in Santo Domingo, Dominican Republic.

== Men's results ==
=== 100 metres ===
Heats – 5 March
Wind:
Heat 1: +1.0 m/s, Heat 2: +0.4 m/s, Heat 3: +0.6 m/s, Heat 4: +0.1 m/s

Rank	Heat	Name	Nationality	Time	Notes
1	2	José Triana	Cuba	10.62	Q
2	1	Pablo Montes	Cuba	10.69	Q
3	1	Porfirio Veras	Dominican Republic	10.69	Q
4	1	Félix Mata	Venezuela	10.71	Q
5	3	Silvio Leonard	Cuba	10.78	Q
6	4	Jorge Vizcarrondo	Puerto Rico	10.81	Q
7	4	Donato Vásquez	Dominican Republic	10.83	Q
8	1	Walter Callander	Bahamas	10.88	Q
9	2	Jesús Rohena	Puerto Rico	10.93	Q
10	3	Anthony Davis	Jamaica	10.97	Q
11	3	Miguel Rodríguez	Dominican Republic	10.98	Q
12	2	Noel Lynch	Barbados	11.02	Q
13	3	George Calhern	United States Virgin Islands	11.06	Q
14	3	Guillermo González	Puerto Rico	11.06	
15	3	Pearson Jordan	Barbados	11.06	
16	4	Ronald Russell	United States Virgin Islands	11.12	Q
17	1	Edward Piran	Suriname	11.14	
18	2	Edwin Nar	Netherlands Antilles	11.21	Q
19	1	Elmer Vorn	Netherlands Antilles	11.24	
20	4	Henry Braafhart	Netherlands Antilles	11.35	Q
21	2	Louis Guild	Belize	11.60	
21	4	Rudolph Gentle	Belize	11.60	
23	4	Phedre Georges	Haiti	12.00	

Semifinals – 5 March
Wind:
Heat 1: ? m/s, Heat 2: ? m/s

Rank	Heat	Name	Nationality	Time	Notes
1	1	Silvio Leonard	Cuba	10.55	Q
2	1	Pablo Montes	Cuba	10.57	Q
3	2	José Triana	Cuba	10.60	Q
4	1	Félix Mata	Venezuela	10.68	Q
5	2	Porfirio Veras	Dominican Republic	10.72	Q
6	2	Jorge Vizcarrondo	Puerto Rico	10.83	Q
7	1	Donato Vásquez	Dominican Republic	10.87	Q
8	2	George Calhern	United States Virgin Islands	10.98	Q
9	1	Jesús Rohena	Puerto Rico	11.00	
10	2	Miguel Rodríguez	Dominican Republic	11.05	
11	2	Walter Callander	Bahamas	11.07	
12	2	Anthony Davis	Jamaica	11.10	
13	1	Ronald Russell	United States Virgin Islands	11.13	
14	1	Noel Lynch	Barbados	11.19	
15	2	Edwin Nar	Netherlands Antilles	11.43	
16	1	Henry Braafhart	Netherlands Antilles	11.49	

Final – 6 March
Wind:+1.3 m/s

Rank	Lane	Name	Nationality	Time	Notes
1st place, gold medalist(s)	3	Silvio Leonard	Cuba	10.49	
2nd place, silver medalist(s)	6	José Triana	Cuba	10.67	
3rd place, bronze medalist(s)	1	Pablo Montes	Cuba	10.77	
4	2	Porfirio Veras	Dominican Republic	10.78	
5	4	Félix Mata	Venezuela	10.87	
6	8	Jorge Vizcarrondo	Puerto Rico	10.93	
7	7	Donato Vásquez	Dominican Republic	11.04	
8	5	George Calhern	United States Virgin Islands	11.15	

=== 200 metres ===
Heats – 7 March
Wind:
Heat 1: +2.7 m/s, Heat 2: +0.1 m/s, Heat 3: +3.2 m/s, Heat 4: +2.3 m/s

Rank	Heat	Name	Nationality	Time	Notes
1	3	Pablo Bandomo	Cuba	21.00	Q
2	1	Silvio Leonard	Cuba	21.02	Q
3	4	Enrique Javier	Dominican Republic	21.47	Q
4	2	José Triana	Cuba	21.50	Q
5	1	Anthony Davis	Jamaica	21.61	Q
6	2	Pearson Jordan	Barbados	21.65	Q
7	2	Jesús Rohena	Puerto Rico	21.67	Q
8	3	Gil Fortuna	Dominican Republic	21.82	Q
9	2	Walter Callander	Bahamas	21.86	Q
10	4	Jorge Vizcarrondo	Puerto Rico	21.87	Q
11	1	George Calhern	United States Virgin Islands	21.96	Q
12	3	Noel Lynch	Barbados	22.15	Q
13	1	Donato Vásquez	Dominican Republic	22.22	Q
14	2	Harrison Pilgrin	Belize	22.24	
15	4	Edward Piran	Suriname	22.25	Q
16	3	Edwin Nar	Netherlands Antilles	22.32	Q
17	3	Ronald Russell	United States Virgin Islands	22.38	
18	1	Edsel Trompet	Netherlands Antilles	22.57	
19	4	Henry Braafhart	Netherlands Antilles	22.57	Q
20	1	Rudolph Gentle	Belize	23.16	
21	2	Gary Georges	Haiti	23.75	
	1	Rafael Oferral	Puerto Rico	DNS	
	2	Alfred Daley	Jamaica	DNS	
	3	Richard Hardware	Jamaica	DNS	

Semifinals – 7 March
Wind:
Heat 1: 0.0 m/s, Heat 2: 0.0 m/s

Rank	Heat	Name	Nationality	Time	Notes
1	2	Silvio Leonard	Cuba	20.67	Q
2	1	Pablo Bandomo	Cuba	21.17	Q
3	1	Anthony Davis	Jamaica	21.34	Q
4	2	Enrique Javier	Dominican Republic	21.39	Q
5	1	José Triana	Cuba	21.48	Q
6	2	Jesús Rohena	Puerto Rico	21.51	Q
7	2	George Calhern	United States Virgin Islands	21.61	Q
8	2	Pearson Jordan	Barbados	21.74	
9	1	Walter Callander	Bahamas	21.78	Q
10	1	Jorge Vizcarrondo	Puerto Rico	21.81	
11	2	Donato Vásquez	Dominican Republic	21.87	
12	2	Edward Piran	Suriname	21.97	
13	1	Gil Fortuna	Dominican Republic	22.21	
14	1	Noel Lynch	Barbados	22.48	
15	2	Henry Braafhart	Netherlands Antilles	22.50	
16	1	Edwin Nar	Netherlands Antilles	22.53	

Final – 8 March
Wind: +2.3 m/s

Rank	Lane	Name	Nationality	Time	Notes
1st place, gold medalist(s)	3	Silvio Leonard	Cuba	20.99	
2nd place, silver medalist(s)	6	Pablo Bandomo	Cuba	21.37	
3rd place, bronze medalist(s)	4	José Triana	Cuba	21.54	
4	2	Anthony Davis	Jamaica	21.58	
5	8	George Calhern	United States Virgin Islands	21.63	
6	7	Enrique Javier	Dominican Republic	21.75	
7	1	Jesús Rohena	Puerto Rico	22.02	
8	5	Walter Callander	Bahamas	22.03	

=== 400 metres ===
Heats – 8 March

Rank	Heat	Name	Nationality	Time	Notes
1	1	Alberto Juantorena	Cuba	45.58	Q, GR
2	1	Julio Meades	Dominican Republic	48.08	Q
3	1	Juan Bonilla	Puerto Rico	48.87	q
4	1	Enrique Aguirre	Mexico	48.72	
5	1	Padrón Cruz	Venezuela	49.57	
6	1	Harrison Pilgrin	Belize	51.94	
	1	Trevor Campbell	Jamaica	DNS	
1	2	Iván Mangual	Puerto Rico	46.50	Q
2	2	Antonio Álvarez	Cuba	47.45	Q
3	2	Macoly McGregor	Venezuela	48.67	
4	2	Ramón Castillo	Dominican Republic	48.82	
5	2	Alejandro Sánchez	Mexico	49.27	
6	2	Raymond Stevens	United States Virgin Islands	50.61	
	2	Kim Rowe	Jamaica	DNS	
1	3	Erick Phillips	Venezuela	46.83	Q
2	3	Seymour Newman	Jamaica	46.97	Q
3	3	Eddy Gutiérrez	Cuba	47.03	q
4	3	Orominio Santaella	Puerto Rico	48.93	
5	3	Aurelio Méndez	Dominican Republic	49.61	
6	3	Francisco Menocal	Nicaragua	51.03	
7	3	Rupert Taylor	Belize	53.09	
	3	Gilberto Gamillo	Mexico	DNS	

Final – 9 March

Rank	Lane	Name	Nationality	Time	Notes
1st place, gold medalist(s)	3	Alberto Juantorena	Cuba	45.52	GR
2nd place, silver medalist(s)		Seymour Newman	Jamaica	46.34	
3rd place, bronze medalist(s)	5	Iván Mangual	Puerto Rico	46.42	
4	2	Eddy Gutiérrez	Cuba	46.75	
5	1	Erick Phillips	Venezuela	46.97	
6	4	Antonio Álvarez	Cuba	47.57	
7		Julio Meades	Dominican Republic	47.98	
8	6	Juan Bonilla	Puerto Rico	49.41	

=== 800 metres ===
Heats – 6 March

Rank	Heat	Name	Nationality	Time	Notes
1	1	Leandro Civil	Cuba	1:50.50	Q
2	1	Héctor López	Venezuela	1:50.52	Q
3	1	Modesto Comprés	Dominican Republic	1:50.60	q
4	3	Luis Medina	Cuba	1:51.22	Q
5	2	Leotulfo Jiménez	Venezuela	1:51.31	Q
6	2	Gilberto Gamillo	Mexico	1:51.48	Q
7	2	Francisco Correa	Cuba	1:51.51	q
8	2	Richard Riley	Netherlands Antilles	1:51.62	
9	3	Wilfredis León	Venezuela	1:51.80	Q
10	3	Marcelino Ronald	Netherlands Antilles	1:52.34	
11	3	Walker Candelario	Puerto Rico	1:52.91	
12	3	Alejo Castillo	Dominican Republic	1:53.30	
13	2	Jesús Barrero	Colombia	1:54.92	
14	1	Herminio Caló	Puerto Rico	1:54.93	
15	2	José Morales	Dominican Republic	1:56.15	
16	1	Alfredo Moreno	Colombia	1:56.63	
17	1	Francisco Menocal	Nicaragua	1:56.84	
18	3	Félix Ríos	Puerto Rico	2:05.36	

Final – 7 March

Rank	Name	Nationality	Time	Notes
1st place, gold medalist(s)	Leandro Civil	Cuba	1:48.43	GR
2nd place, silver medalist(s)	Luis Medina	Cuba	1:48.68	
3rd place, bronze medalist(s)	Héctor López	Venezuela	1:48.99	
4	Gilberto Gamillo	Mexico	1:49.63	
5	Wilfredis León	Venezuela	1:49.98	
6	Francisco Correa	Cuba	1:50.10	
7	Modesto Comprés	Dominican Republic	1:50.12	
	Leotulfo Jiménez	Venezuela	DQ	

=== 1500 metres ===
Heats – 10 March

Rank	Heat	Name	Nationality	Time	Notes
1	1	José González	Venezuela	3:48.50	Q
2	1	Jesús Barrero	Colombia	3:48.93	Q
3	1	José Bordón	Cuba	3:49.02	Q
4	1	Carlos Báez	Puerto Rico	3:49.32	Q
5	1	Tony Colón	Puerto Rico	3:49.37	Q
6	1	José Neri	Mexico	3:49.49	
7	2	José Cobo	Cuba	3:52.58	Q
8	2	Carlos Martínez	Mexico	3:52.60	Q
9	2	Luis Medina	Cuba	3:54.68	Q
10	2	Wilfredis León	Venezuela	3:56.07	Q
11	2	Alfredo Moreno	Colombia	3:56.22	Q
12	2	Alejo Castillo	Dominican Republic	3:56.26	
13	2	Richard Riley	Netherlands Antilles	3:59.44	
14	2	Walker Candelaria	Puerto Rico	4:00.02	
15	1	José Morales	Dominican Republic	4:07.08	
	1	Modesto Comprés	Dominican Republic	DNS	
	2	Antonio Villanueva	Mexico	DNS	

Final – 12 March

Rank	Name	Nationality	Time	Notes
1st place, gold medalist(s)	Luis Medina	Cuba	3:44.18	GR
2nd place, silver medalist(s)	José González	Venezuela	3:44.52	
3rd place, bronze medalist(s)	Carlos Martínez	Mexico	3:44.90	
4	José Cobo	Cuba	3:45.43	
5	Carlos Báez	Puerto Rico	3:47.01	
6	José Bordón	Cuba	3:47.02	
7	Jesús Barrero	Colombia	3:48.15	
8	Tony Colón	Puerto Rico	3:52.04	
9	Alfredo Moreno	Colombia	3:54.56	
10	Wilfredis León	Venezuela	3:57.30	

=== 5000 metres ===
7 March

Rank	Name	Nationality	Time	Notes
1st place, gold medalist(s)	Víctor Mora	Colombia	13:54.2	GR
2nd place, silver medalist(s)	Jairo Correa	Colombia	14:03.0	
3rd place, bronze medalist(s)	José Neri	Mexico	14:04.0	
4	Lucirio Garrido	Venezuela	14:06.0	
5	Domingo Tibaduiza	Colombia	14:11.2	
6	Rafael Tadeo	Mexico	14:15.6	
7	Pedro Miranda	Mexico	14:23.2	
8	José Bordón	Cuba	14:25.2	
9	Rigoberto Mendoza	Cuba	14:42.0	
10	Juan Calderín	Cuba	15:07.8	
11	Eduardo Veras	Puerto Rico	15:16.0	
12	Sadot Méndez	Puerto Rico	15:25.6	
13	Tito Sotillo	Venezuela	15:27.2	
	Rolando Durán	Dominican Republic	DNF	
	Julio Quevedo	Guatemala	DNS	
	Rafael Pérez	Costa Rica	DNS	

=== 10,000 metres ===
5 March

Rank	Name	Nationality	Time	Notes
1st place, gold medalist(s)	Domingo Tibaduiza	Colombia	30:39.42	GR
2nd place, silver medalist(s)	Rafael Pérez	Costa Rica	30:41.0	
3rd place, bronze medalist(s)	Pedro Miranda	Mexico	30:41.2	
4	Jairo Correa	Colombia	30:43.2	
5	Luis Haro	Mexico	30:43.4	
6	Rafael Tadeo	Mexico	30:43.6	
7	Jairo Cubillos	Colombia	30:52.0	
8	Sadot Méndez	Puerto Rico	31:18.4	
9	Eduardo Veras	Puerto Rico	31:24.0	
10	Felipe Chaviano	Cuba	31:51.0	
11	Clovis Morales	Honduras	31:55.0	
12	Julio Quevedo	Guatemala	31:55.0	
	Flores Pérez	Cuba	DNF	
	Carlos Acosta	El Salvador	DNF	
	José Medina	Venezuela	DNS	
	Victoriano López	Guatemala	DNS	

=== Marathon ===
12 March

Rank	Name	Nationality	Time	Notes
1st place, gold medalist(s)	Gilberto Serna	Colombia	2:28:08	GR
2nd place, silver medalist(s)	Agustín Reyes	Puerto Rico	2:32:08	
3rd place, bronze medalist(s)	José de Jesús	Puerto Rico	2:32:54	
4	Carlos Cuque López	Guatemala	2:35:16	
5	Victoriano López	Guatemala	2:36:10	
6	Andrés Romero	Mexico	2:38:17	
7	Clovis Morales	Honduras	2:40:00	
8	Jacinto Sabinal	Mexico	2:40:27	
9	Chuc Manuel	Cuba	2:43:27	
10	Sadot Méndez	Puerto Rico	2:43:32	
11	Felipe Chaviano	Cuba	2:45:10	
12	Víctor Rodríguez	Dominican Republic	2:52:07	
13	David Soriano	Dominican Republic	2:56:09	
	Santiago Barón	Colombia	DNF	
	Flores Pérez	Cuba	DNF	
	Carlos Acosta	El Salvador	DNS	
	Emmanuel Bouillon	Haiti	DNS	
	Hipólito López	Honduras	DNS	

=== 110 metres hurdles ===
Heats – 8 March
Wind: +0.2 m/s

Rank	Heat	Name	Nationality	Time	Notes
1	2	Guillermo Núñez	Cuba	14.30	Q
2	1	Alejandro Casañas	Cuba	14.62	Q
3	1	Francisco Dumeng	Puerto Rico	14.75	Q
4	2	José Cartas	Mexico	14.80	Q
5	2	José Luis Santiago	Puerto Rico	14.85	Q
6	2	Óscar Marín	Venezuela	14.95	Q
7	1	César Duff	Panama	16.78	Q
	1	Harold Smith	Jamaica	DNS	
	1	Daniel Smith	Bahamas	DNS	
	1	Francisco Menocal	Nicaragua	DNS	
	2	Godfrey Murray	Jamaica	DNS	

Final – 9 March
Wind: +2.1 m/s

Rank	Lane	Name	Nationality	Time	Notes
1st place, gold medalist(s)	3	Alejandro Casañas	Cuba	13.80	
2nd place, silver medalist(s)	8	Guillermo Núñez	Cuba	13.93	
3rd place, bronze medalist(s)	2	Francisco Dumeng	Puerto Rico	14.10	
4	7	José Cartas	Mexico	14.51	
5	4	Óscar Marín	Venezuela	14.63	
6	6	José Luis Santiago	Puerto Rico	14.83	
7	5	César Duff	Panama	15.57	

=== 400 metres hurdles ===
Heats – 5 March

Rank	Heat	Name	Nationality	Time	Notes
1	1	Iván Mangual	Puerto Rico	51.30	Q, NR
2	1	Fabio Zúñiga	Colombia	52.09	Q
3	2	José Luis Santiago	Puerto Rico	52.35	Q
4	1	Guillermo Núñez	Cuba	52.54	Q
5	2	Eulogio Robles	Cuba	53.20	Q
6	1	Enrique Aguirre	Mexico	53.33	Q
7	2	Alejandro Sánchez	Mexico	54.34	Q
8	2	Juan García	Cuba	55.45	Q
9	1	Francisco Dumeng	Puerto Rico	55.80	
10	2	Francisco Menocal	Nicaragua	59.80	

Final – 6 March

Rank	Name	Nationality	Time	Notes
1st place, gold medalist(s)	Fabio Zúñiga	Colombia	50.61	
2nd place, silver medalist(s)	Guillermo Núñez	Cuba	50.87	
3rd place, bronze medalist(s)	Iván Mangual	Puerto Rico	51.65	
4	José Luis Santiago	Puerto Rico	52.32	
5	Eulogio Robles	Cuba	52.36	
6	Juan García	Cuba	52.42	
7	Enrique Aguirre	Mexico	52.96	
8	Alejandro Sánchez	Mexico	53.78	

=== 3000 metres steeplechasee ===
6 March

Rank	Name	Nationality	Time	Notes
1st place, gold medalist(s)	José Cobo	Cuba	8:50.8	GR
2nd place, silver medalist(s)	Antonio Villanueva	Mexico	8:52.0	
3rd place, bronze medalist(s)	Lucirio Garrido	Venezuela	8:54.8	
4	Rigoberto Mendoza	Cuba	8:55.8	
5	José González	Venezuela	9:06.4	
6	Agustín Reyes	Puerto Rico	9:41.6	
	Carlos Báez	Puerto Rico	DNF	
	Juan Calderín	Cuba	DNF	
	Rafael Pérez	Costa Rica	DNS	

=== 4 × 100 metres relay ===
12 March

Rank	Team	Athletes	Time	Notes
1st place, gold medalist(s)	Cuba	José Triana, Silvio Leonard, Pablo Montes, Pablo Bandomo	39.62	
2nd place, silver medalist(s)	Dominican Republic	Porfirio Veras, Julio Meades, Enrique Javier, Gil Fortuna	40.35	
3rd place, bronze medalist(s)	Netherlands Antilles	Elmer Vorn, Edwin Nar, Henry Braafhart, Edsel Trompet	41.79	
4	Belize	Rudolph Gentle, Harrison Pilgrin, Louis Guild, Rupert Taylor	43.38	
	Puerto Rico	Jorge Vizcarrondo, Jesús Rohena, Iván Mangual, Wilfredo Maisonave	DQ	(Note: Changing the line-up after the deadline)

=== 4 × 400 metres relay ===
12 March

Rank	Team	Athletes	Time	Notes
1st place, gold medalist(s)	Cuba	Eduardo García, Eddy Gutiérrez, Antonio Álvarez, Alberto Juantorena	3:06.36	GR
2nd place, silver medalist(s)	Venezuela	Víctor Patíñez, Héctor López, Félix Mata, Erick Phillips	3:07.23	
3rd place, bronze medalist(s)	Jamaica	Noel Gray, Seymour Newman, Anthony Davis, Clive Barriffe	3:07.52	
4	Puerto Rico	Jesús Rohena, Orominio Santaella, Iván Mangual, Juan Bonilla	3:10.60	
5	Dominican Republic	Enrique Javier, Aurelio Méndez, Ruddy Castillo, Julio Meades	3:13.54	
6	Mexico	Alejandro Sánchez, Enrique Aguirre, Carlos Martínez, Gilberto Gamillo	3:18.98	

=== 20 kilometres walk ===
6 March

Rank	Name	Nationality	Time	Notes
1st place, gold medalist(s)	Raúl González	Mexico	1:35:23	GR
2nd place, silver medalist(s)	Pedro Aroche	Mexico	1:35:33	
3rd place, bronze medalist(s)	Ernesto Alfaro	Colombia	1:38:57	
4	Rafael Vega	Colombia	1:43:36	
5	Alfredo Garrido	Cuba	1:43:57	
6	Hipólito López	Honduras	1:46:52	
7	Rafael Genao	Dominican Republic	1:50:02	
8	Ruddy Castillo	Dominican Republic	1:50:35	
9	Raúl Lanza	Honduras	1:55:26	
	Domingo Colín	Mexico	DQ	
	Raúl Quintana	Cuba	DNF	

=== High jump ===
12 March

Rank	Name	Nationality	1.65	1.70	1.75	1.80	1.85	1.90	1.95	1.98	2.01	2.04	2.07	2.10	2.14	Result	Notes
1st place, gold medalist(s)	Richard Spencer	Cuba	–	–	–	–	–	–	xo	–	xo	o	xo	o	xxx	2.10	GR
2nd place, silver medalist(s)	Amado Olaguiber	Cuba	–	–	–	–	–	o	o	–	o	o	o	xxx		2.07	
3rd place, bronze medalist(s)	Gilbert Roland	Cuba	–	–	–	–	–	o	o	–	o	o	xxx			2.04	
4	José Luis León	Mexico	–	–	–	o	o	xo	xxo	xo	xxx					1.98	
5	Clive Barriffe	Jamaica	o	o	–	o	o	o	xo	xxx						1.95	
6	Michael Hodges	Jamaica	o	o	o	o	xo	xo	xxo	xx–	x					1.95	
7	Cristóbal de León	Dominican Republic	–	–	–	–	o	o	xxx							1.90	
8	Cecilio Wilson	Panama	–	–	o	o	o	xo	xxx							1.90	
9	Williams Rivera	Puerto Rico	o	o	o	–	o	xxx								1.85	
10	Mariano Reyes	Dominican Republic	o	o	o	o	o	xxx								1.85	

=== Pole vault ===
8 March

Rank	Name	Nationality	4.10	4.20	4.30	4.40	4.50	4.55	4.60	4.75	4.95	5.05	Result	Notes
1st place, gold medalist(s)	Roberto Moré	Cuba	–	–	–	–	o	o	xo	o	xo	xxx	4.95	GR
2nd place, silver medalist(s)	Juan Laza	Cuba	–	–	–	–	o	o	xo	o	xxx		4.75	
3rd place, bronze medalist(s)	Edgardo Rivera	Puerto Rico	–	–	–	xxo	–	xxo	xxx				4.55	
4	Giro Valdez	Colombia	o	xo	o	o	xxx						4.40	
5	Jorge Miranda	Puerto Rico	–	–	–	xo	–	xxx					4.40	
6	Arturo Esquerda	Mexico	–	o	–	xo	xxx						4.40	
7	Augusto Perdomo	Cuba	–	–	xo	xxo	xxx						4.40	
	Héctor Olano	El Salvador											DNS	
	Gregorio Ortiz	Dominican Republic											DNS	

=== Long jump ===
10 March

Rank	Name	Nationality	#1	#2	#3	#4	#5	#6	Result	Notes
1st place, gold medalist(s)	Wilfredo Maisonave	Puerto Rico	7.36	7.44	7.14	7.17	7.42	6.69	7.44	
2nd place, silver medalist(s)	Milán Matos	Cuba	7.04	7.43	7.23	7.16	7.30	7.22	7.43	
3rd place, bronze medalist(s)	Francisco Gómez	Cuba	x	7.16	x	x	7.41	x	7.41	
4	Carlos Calderón	Cuba	x	7.33	6.81	x	7.29	x	7.33	
5	Salomón Rowe	Guatemala	6.75	6.71	7.11	6.87	7.27	7.00	7.27	
6	Edward Piran	Suriname	6.93	6.90	6.80	6.78	6.62	6.75	6.93	
7	Harrison Pilgrin	Belize	6.07	6.89	5.53	6.44	5.76	6.84	6.89	
8	Edsel Trompet	Netherlands Antilles	6.60	6.76	6.80	x	6.63	6.01	6.80	
9	Otilio Reyes	Dominican Republic	6.48	6.47	?				6.48	

=== Triple jump ===
9 March

Rank	Name	Nationality	#1	#2	#3	#4	#5	#6	Result	Notes
1st place, gold medalist(s)	Pedro Pérez	Cuba	16.67	16.23	16.83*	16.51	x	17.01w	17.01w	GR*
2nd place, silver medalist(s)	Armando Herrera	Cuba	15.22	15.73	16.37w	16.25	x	15.74	16.37w	
3rd place, bronze medalist(s)	Juvenal Pérez	Cuba	x	15.91	x	15.85	x	15.58	15.91	
4	Edgar Moreno	Venezuela	15.52	15.16	15.63	x	14.96	15.26	15.63	
5	César Duff	Panama	x	14.20	13.49	x	x	14.34	14.34	
6	Ibrain Medina	Dominican Republic	x	x	14.08	x	x	13.95	14.08	
	Wilfredo Maisonave	Puerto Rico							DNS	

=== Shot put ===
5 March

Rank	Name	Nationality	#1	#2	#3	#4	#5	#6	Result	Notes
1st place, gold medalist(s)	José Carreño	Venezuela	14.44	15.69	16.20	x	x	15.42	16.20	
2nd place, silver medalist(s)	Nicolás Hernández	Cuba	15.11	15.37	16.09	15.62	15.38	15.92	16.09	
3rd place, bronze medalist(s)	Pedro Serrano	Puerto Rico	15.12	14.87	15.37	15.85	15.38	15.13	15.85	
4	Benigno Hodelín	Cuba	14.69	14.99	15.29	15.40	15.69	15.39	15.69	
5	Jesús Ramos	Venezuela	15.16	x	14.77	13.99	14.83	x	15.16	
6	Pablo Lamothe	Cuba	14.69	15.14	13.85	14.37	12.57	14.72	15.14	
7	Secundino Reyes	Dominican Republic	14.30	14.53	14.12	13.76	14.27	14.06	14.53	
8	Jozef Pouriel	Netherlands Antilles	13.94	x	14.29	13.81	14.38	14.33	14.38	
9	Antonio Mejía	Dominican Republic	13.89	x	13.91				13.91	
10	Mauricio Jubis	El Salvador	x	13.34	13.37				13.37	
11	Iván Turcios	Nicaragua	x	x	12.60				12.60	
	Joaquín Rodas	El Salvador	x	r					NM	

=== Discus throw ===
6 March

Rank	Name	Nationality	#1	#2	#3	#4	#5	#6	Result	Notes
1st place, gold medalist(s)	Julián Morrinson	Cuba	55.32	56.78	58.10	54.22	56.28	57.08	58.10	GR
2nd place, silver medalist(s)	Javier Moreno	Cuba	50.54	50.92	51.04	48.60	50.90	50.76	51.04	
3rd place, bronze medalist(s)	Ignacio Reinosa	Puerto Rico	47.70	46.98	x	x	47.82	49.30	49.30	
4	Gilberto Martínez	Dominican Republic	x	42.26	48.04	44.18	48.76	x	48.76	
5	Benigno Hodelín	Cuba	38.26	x	43.18	46.80	43.34	x	46.80	
6	Joaquín Rodas	El Salvador	37.76	45.28	44.46	46.72	x	44.96	46.72	
7	Desiderio Lebrón	Dominican Republic	x	43.10	x	45.46	41.46	34.80	45.46	
8	José Carreño	Venezuela	x	43.24	42.40	41.86	42.76	x	43.24	
9	Lambertus Rabel	Netherlands Antilles	x	42.58	39.46				42.58	
10	Roberto Pérez	Puerto Rico	42.26	x	42.24				42.26	
11	Iván Turcios	Nicaragua	40.24	41.74	37.68				41.74	
12	Arturo Gil Báez	Dominican Republic	40.88	39.82	40.62				40.88	
13	Jozef Pouriel	Netherlands Antilles	x	40.74	x				40.74	
14	Mauricio Jubis	El Salvador	38.12	x	34.86				38.12	

=== Hammer throw ===
8 March

Rank	Name	Nationality	#1	#2	#3	#4	#5	#6	Result	Notes
1st place, gold medalist(s)	Pedro Garbey	Cuba	60.80	61.50	60.68	59.56	x	x	61.50	
2nd place, silver medalist(s)	Víctor Suárez	Cuba	56.40	53.32	55.20	59.16	57.32	x	59.16	
3rd place, bronze medalist(s)	Genovevo Morejón	Cuba	54.54	x	54.58	56.64	57.46	57.58	57.58	
4	William Dineen Silén	Puerto Rico	x	55.56	56.46	53.92	56.54	56.42	56.54	
5	Pedro Granell	Puerto Rico	51.56	51.44	52.34	x	x	489.80	52.34	
6	Jorge Maldonado	Colombia	45.46	x	47.04	44.26	46.52	47.88	47.88	
7	Juan Varela	El Salvador	46.94	46.58	46.92	45.94	45.64	46.64	46.94	
8	Francisco Argüello	Nicaragua	42.74	42.32	41.88	41.86	43.40	42.60	43.40	

=== Javelin throw ===
7 March – Old model

Rank	Name	Nationality	#1	#2	#3	#4	#5	#6	Result	Notes
1st place, gold medalist(s)	Raúl Fernández	Cuba	71.58	72.90	x	67.02	70.88	75.30	75.30	
2nd place, silver medalist(s)	Juan Jarvis	Cuba	69.16	68.94	x	x	x	x	69.16	
3rd place, bronze medalist(s)	Salomón Robbins	Mexico	67.10	64.60	66.38	66.82	x	65.82	67.10	
4	Héctor Vinent	Cuba	66.22	63.10	x	61.84	61.40	64.70	66.22	
5	Roque Batista	Dominican Republic	64.62	66.08	x	60.30	58.92	x	66.08	
6	Manuel Martínez	Dominican Republic	60.80	x	49.50	56.84	48.88	53.96	60.80	
7	José Peralta	Nicaragua	52.66	52.94	48.96	53.80	56.06	52.30	56.06	
8	Ruddy Aguilar	El Salvador	53.86	53.62	50.02	x	53.54	x	53.86	

=== Decathlon ===
10–11 March – 1962 tables

The highest mark recorded in each event is highlighted in yellow

Rank	Athlete	Nationality	100m	LJ	SP	HJ	400m	110m H	DT	PV	JT	1500m	Points	Notes
1st place, gold medalist(s)	Jesús Mirabal	Cuba	10.58	6.79	14.02	1.85	50.08	14.89	42.70	4.10	63.54	5:22.60	7470	GR
2nd place, silver medalist(s)	Rigoberto Salazar	Cuba	11.01	7.22	12.76	1.90	50.79	15.23	40.90	4.00	61.84	5:14.60	7305	
3rd place, bronze medalist(s)	Orlando Pedroso	Cuba	11.32	7.32	12.96	1.70	51.23	15.71	45.72	3.90	53.68	4:59.17	7060	
4	Ramón Montezuma	Venezuela	11.39	6.38	12.74	1.85	49.43	15.96	40.02	3.20	54.10	4:29.70	6909	
5	Doel Bonilla	Puerto Rico	11.25	6.15	12.00	1.75	52.53	16.21	28.62	3.35	55.54	4:58.20	6238	
6	Elpidio Encarnación	Dominican Republic	11.36	5.90	11.85	1.60	51.92	16.75	37.12	2.95	49.48	4:35.10	6238	
7	Celso Aragón	Colombia	11.41	6.19	14.06	1.95	53.10	16.25	40.50	3.40	NM	5:11.40	5988	
8	José Peralta	Nicaragua	12.07	5.73	11.44	1.50	55.85	17.46	34.24	3.50	49.80	5:17.45	5449	
9	Ruddy Aguilar	El Salvador	11.88	5.91	11.16	1.65	56.85	18.41	32.18	3.00	53.40	5:12.26	5430	
10	Frederick Evans	Belize	12.09	6.15	10.09	1.60	55.50	20.65	27.02	2.80	42.18	4:34.77	5104	
	Guillermo González	Puerto Rico	10.98	6.38	NM	DNS	–	–	–	–	–	–	DNF	

== Women's results ==
=== 100 metres ===
Heats – 6 March
Wind:
Heat 1: +0.9 m/s, Heat 2: +2.6 m/s, Heat 3: +0.1 m/s, Heat 4: ? m/s

Rank	Heat	Name	Nationality	Time	Notes
1	2	Carmen Valdés	Cuba	11.66	Q
2	2	Elsy Rivas	Colombia	11.86	Q
3	4	Lelieth Hodges	Jamaica	11.90	Q
4	2	Janet Stoute	Barbados	11.96	Q
5	1	Silvia Chivás	Cuba	11.98	Q
6	3	Margarita Martínez	Panama	12.06	Q
7	1	Diva Bishop	Panama	12.09	Q
8	3	Nerva Bultrón	Puerto Rico	12.15	Q
9	4	Marlene Elejalde	Cuba	12.23	Q
10	1	Elsa Antúnez	Venezuela	12.28	Q
11	4	Gladys Gómez	Dominican Republic	12.45	Q
12	2	Maritza Escalona	Panama	12.50	Q
13	2	Shareen Ruimveld	Netherlands Antilles	12.51	
14	4	Corina Garduño	Mexico	12.54	Q
15	1	Grace Lynch	Netherlands Antilles	12.55	Q
16	2	Zonia Meigham	Guatemala	12.57	
17	1	Hanna Rosheuvel	Suriname	12.58	
18	3	Sharon Wilson	Barbados	12.60	Q
19	2	Brunilda Figueroa	Puerto Rico	12.70	
19	3	Mireya Vásquez	Mexico	12.70	Q
21	4	Helen Carmona	Puerto Rico	12.71	
22	3	Georgina Godfrey	Dominican Republic	12.92	
23	1	Flora Torres	El Salvador	13.12	
24	1	Ana Laura Gray	Mexico	13.40	
	4	Lorna Forde	Barbados	DNS	

Semifinals – 6 March
Wind:
Heat 1: +0.1 m/s, Heat 2: 0.0 m/s

Rank	Heat	Name	Nationality	Time	Notes
1	1	Carmen Valdés	Cuba	12.01	Q
2	2	Silvia Chivás	Cuba	12.11	Q
3	1	Lelieth Hodges	Jamaica	12.28	Q
4	1	Marlene Elejalde	Cuba	12.30	Q
5	2	Elsy Rivas	Colombia	12.30	Q
6	2	Janet Stoute	Barbados	12.38	Q
7	1	Margarita Martínez	Panama	12.41	Q
8	2	Diva Bishop	Panama	12.47	Q
9	1	Nerva Bultrón	Puerto Rico	12.48	
10	2	Elsa Antúnez	Venezuela	12.72	
11	2	Corina Garduño	Mexico	12.88	
12	1	Gladys Gómez	Dominican Republic	12.94	
13	1	Sharon Wilson	Barbados	13.00	
14	2	Grace Lynch	Netherlands Antilles	13.05	
15	1	Mireya Vásquez	Mexico	13.51	
16	2	Maritza Escalona	Panama	13.11	

Final – 7 March
No wind information

Rank	Lane	Name	Nationality	Time	Notes
1st place, gold medalist(s)	6	Carmen Valdés	Cuba	11.55	GR
2nd place, silver medalist(s)	7	Silvia Chivás	Cuba	11.65	
3rd place, bronze medalist(s)	1	Lelieth Hodges	Jamaica	11.75	
4	3	Margarita Martínez	Panama	12.02	
5	4	Marlene Elejalde	Cuba	12.03	
6		Janet Stoute	Barbados	12.04	
7	5	Diva Bishop	Panama	12.04	
8		Elsy Rivas	Colombia	12.08	

=== 200 metres ===
Heats – 9 March
No wind information

Rank	Heat	Name	Nationality	Time	Notes
1	2	Carmen Valdés	Cuba	23.88	Q
2	3	Asunción Acosta	Cuba	23.97	Q
3	2	Elsy Rivas	Colombia	24.19	Q
4	1	Diva Bishop	Panama	24.36	Q
5	3	Margarita Martínez	Panama	24.37	Q
6	3	Janet Stoute	Barbados	24.60	q
7	1	Nerva Bultrón	Puerto Rico	24.92	Q
8	3	Elsa Antúnez	Venezuela	24.96	q
9	2	Corina Garduño	Mexico	24.98	
10	2	Zonia Meigham	Guatemala	25.31	
11	2	Vilma Paris	Puerto Rico	25.76	
12	2	Clotilde Morales	Panama	25.86	
13	3	Helen Carmona	Puerto Rico	25.91	
14	1	Mireya Vásquez	Mexico	25.96	
15	3	Ana Laura Gray	Mexico	27.07	
16	2	Grace Lynch	Netherlands Antilles	28.06	
	1	Lorna Forde	Barbados	DNS	
	1	Silvia Chivás	Cuba	DNS	
	3	Ruth Williams	Jamaica	DNS	

Final – 10 March
No wind information

Rank	Lane	Name	Nationality	Time	Notes
1st place, gold medalist(s)	2	Carmen Valdés	Cuba	23.76	
2nd place, silver medalist(s)	5	Asunción Acosta	Cuba	24.21	
3rd place, bronze medalist(s)		Diva Bishop	Panama	24.39	
4		Margarita Martínez	Panama	24.65	
5		Elsy Rivas	Colombia	24.68	
6		Janet Stoute	Barbados	24.72	
7		Nerva Bultrón	Puerto Rico	24.86	
8		Elsa Antúnez	Venezuela	25.39	

=== 400 metres ===
Heats – 7 March

Rank	Heat	Name	Nationality	Time	Notes
1	1	Aurelia Pentón	Cuba	53.42	Q
2	2	Carmen Trustée	Cuba	54.87	Q
3	3	Asunción Acosta	Cuba	55.06	Q
4	1	Charlotte Bradley	Mexico	55.78	Q
5	1	Judith Smith	United States Virgin Islands	56.29	q
6	3	Eucaris Caicedo	Colombia	56.81	Q
7	2	Enriqueta Nava	Mexico	57.15	Q
8	3	Hanna Rosheuvel	Suriname	57.74	q
9	3	Barbara Bishop	Barbados	58.58	
10	1	Ileana Hopkins	Puerto Rico	58.95	
11	3	Zonia Meigham	Guatemala	59.12	
12	2	Vilma Paris	Puerto Rico	59.44	
13	2	June Griffith	Guyana	1:35.71	
	1	Isabel de la Cruz	Dominican Republic	DNS	
	2	Elsy Rivas	Colombia	DNS	
	2	Lorna Forde	Barbados	DNS	
	3	Marilyn Neufville	Jamaica	DNS	

Final – 8 March

Rank	Name	Nationality	Time	Notes
1st place, gold medalist(s)	Aurelia Pentón	Cuba	52.27	
2nd place, silver medalist(s)	Carmen Trustée	Cuba	52.91	
3rd place, bronze medalist(s)	Asunción Acosta	Cuba	53.92	
4	Judith Smith	United States Virgin Islands	55.05	
5	Eucaris Caicedo	Colombia	55.43	
6	Charlotte Bradley	Mexico	55.90	
7	Enriqueta Nava	Mexico	56.86	
8	Hanna Rosheuvel	Suriname	57.42	

=== 800 metres ===
Heats – 10 March

Rank	Heat	Name	Nationality	Time	Notes
1	1	Ivonne White	Jamaica	2:12.71	Q
2	1	Charlotte Bradley	Mexico	2:13.71	Q
3	2	Enriqueta Nava	Mexico	2:17.50	Q
4	2	Ileana Hopkins	Puerto Rico	2:20.65	Q
5	2	Aurelia Pentón	Cuba	2:20.74	Q
6	2	Magaly Dalman	Cuba	2:20.83	Q
7	1	Carmen Trustée	Cuba	2:30.22	Q
8	1	Eucaris Caicedo	Colombia	2:30.42	Q
	1	Hanna Rosheuvel	Suriname	DNS	
	1	June Griffith	Guyana	DNS	

Final – 11 March

Rank	Name	Nationality	Time	Notes
1st place, gold medalist(s)	Charlotte Bradley	Mexico	2:04.55	GR
2nd place, silver medalist(s)	Aurelia Pentón	Cuba	2:05.43	
3rd place, bronze medalist(s)	Enriqueta Nava	Mexico	2:05.89	
4	Carmen Trustée	Cuba	2:06.06	
5	Ivonne White	Jamaica	2:08.56	
6	Magaly Dalman	Cuba	2:09.14	
7	Eucaris Caicedo	Colombia	2:15.32	
8	Ileana Hopkins	Puerto Rico	2:15.49	

=== 100 metres hurdles ===
Final – 10 March

Rank	Lane	Name	Nationality	Time	Notes
1st place, gold medalist(s)	5	Marlene Elejarde	Cuba	14.53	
2nd place, silver medalist(s)	3	Mercedes Román	Mexico	14.69	
3rd place, bronze medalist(s)	8	Raquel Martínez	Cuba	14.74	
4	4	Silvia Alfonso	Cuba	14.79	
5	2	María Ángeles Cato	Mexico	15.10	
6	6	Beatriz Aparicio	Panama	15.39	
7	7	Cheryl Blackman	Barbados	15.47	

=== 4 × 100 metres relay ===
12 March

Rank	Team	Athletes	Time	Notes
1st place, gold medalist(s)	Cuba	Marlene Elejalde, Carmen Valdés, Asunción Acosta, Silvia Chivás	44.90	
2nd place, silver medalist(s)	Panama	Diva Bishop, Margarita Martínez, Maritza Escalona, Beatriz Aparicio	47.42	
3rd place, bronze medalist(s)	Mexico	Mercedes Román, María Ángeles Cato, Mireya Vázquez, Corina Garduño	48.02	
4	Puerto Rico	Brunilda Figueroa, Helen Carmona, Vilma Paris, Nerva Bultrón	48.14	
5	Netherlands Antilles	Grace Lynch, Shareen Ruimveld, Maurina Maduro, Ciska Jansen	48.43	
6	Barbados	Sharon Wilson, Janet Stoute, Barbara Bishop, Cheryl Blackman	48.46	
	Jamaica		DNS	

=== High jump ===
9 March

Rank	Name	Nationality	1.35	1.40	1.45	1.50	1.53	1.56	1.59	1.62	1.65	1.68	1.71	1.74	1.77	Result	Notes
1st place, gold medalist(s)	Lucía Duquet	Cuba	–	–	–	–	–	–	–	o	o	o	o	o	xxx	1.74	GR
2nd place, silver medalist(s)	Elisa Ávila	Mexico	–	–	–	–	o	o	–	xxo	o	xo	o	o	xxx	1.74	=GR
3rd place, bronze medalist(s)	Maritza García	Cuba	–	–	–	o	–	o	o	o	xo	o	xxo	xxx		1.71	
4	Ángela Carbonell	Cuba	–	–	–	–	o	o	o	xxo	o	xxx				1.65	
5	June Griffith	Guyana	–	o	–	–	o	o	o	xxx						1.59	
6	Ana Rojas	Venezuela	–	–	xo	o	xo	o	xo	xxx						1.59	
7	Marisela Peralta	Dominican Republic	o	o	o	o	xxx									1.50	
8	Rafaela Flores	Puerto Rico	o	o	xo	o	xxx									1.50	
	Sixta Román	Puerto Rico														DNS	

=== Long jump ===
5 March

Rank	Name	Nationality	#1	#2	#3	#4	#5	#6	Result	Notes
1st place, gold medalist(s)	Marcia Garbey	Cuba	5.55	6.48	5.76	5.87	6.01	6.00	6.48	
2nd place, silver medalist(s)	Ana Alexander	Cuba	5.48	5.55	x	5.82	x	6.07	6.07	
3rd place, bronze medalist(s)	Dora Thompson	Cuba	x	5.02	5.25	5.45	5.64	5.75	5.75	
4	Sharon Wilson	Barbados	5.23	4.88	5.12	5.03	5.34	5.23	5.34	
5	June Griffith	Guyana	5.28	5.10	5.04	5.14	5.09	5.21	5.28	
6	Divina Estrella	Dominican Republic	x	x	5.11	4.49	x	x	5.11	
7	Shareen Ruimveld	Netherlands Antilles	x	5.11	5.05	5.06	4.79	4.76	5.11	
8	Lizama Torres	El Salvador	4.81	4.87	4.99	4.47	4.86	4.80	4.99	
9	Grace Lynch	Netherlands Antilles	4.35	4.11	4.90				4.90	
10	Hanna Rosheuvel	Suriname	x	x	4.84				4.84	
11	Rafaela Flores	Puerto Rico	4.78	4.70	4.62				4.78	
12	Sixta Román	Puerto Rico	4.37	4.37	4.34				4.37	

=== Shot put ===
12 March

Rank	Name	Nationality	#1	#2	#3	#4	#5	#6	Result	Notes
1st place, gold medalist(s)	María Elena Sarría	Cuba	x	13.89	13.83	14.60	13.85	14.14	14.60	GR
2nd place, silver medalist(s)	Hilda Ramírez	Cuba	x	13.93	14.40	13.14	13.85	14.14	14.40	
3rd place, bronze medalist(s)	Caridad Romero	Cuba	13.33	13.44	13.23	13.14	13.82	13.75	13.82	
4	Patricia Andrews	Venezuela	11.86	12.35	x	12.16	x	11.82	12.35	
5	Martha Vásquez	El Salvador	10.91	11.50	11.67	11.62	10.98	11.18	11.67	
6	Orlanda Lynch	Suriname	x	11.05	11.57	11.15	11.54	11.48	11.57	
7	Patricia Comandari	El Salvador	10.31	10.14	9.96	10.39	9.90	x	10.39	
	Tomasina Lugo	Dominican Republic							DNS	

=== Discus throw ===
9 March

Rank	Name	Nationality	#1	#2	#3	#4	#5	#6	Result	Notes
1st place, gold medalist(s)	Carmen Romero	Cuba	x	52.88	x	x	54.70	53.70	54.70	GR
2nd place, silver medalist(s)	María Cristina Betancourt	Cuba	52.20	49.34	x	49.70	49.02	49.28	52.20	
3rd place, bronze medalist(s)	Salvadora Vargas	Cuba	x	41.22	41.14	40.50	40.38	38.26	41.22	
4	Patricia Andrews	Venezuela	40.30	40.92	x	40.44	32.46	37.58	40.92	
5	Orlanda Lynch	Suriname	37.50	37.54	27.34	27.06	24.96	34.02	37.54	
6	Juana Mejía	Dominican Republic	33.58	35.34	34.56	34.02	33.10	34.46	35.34	
7	Patricia Comandari	El Salvador	x	24.12	20.00	32.34	34.86	29.08	34.86	
8	Martha Vásquez	El Salvador	25.90	30.10	31.92	30.00	x	x	31.92	

=== Javelin throw ===
5 March – Old model

Rank	Name	Nationality	#1	#2	#3	#4	#5	#6	Result	Notes
1st place, gold medalist(s)	Tomasa Núñez	Cuba	44.38	45.24	47.58	46.52	x	47.12	47.58	GR
2nd place, silver medalist(s)	María Beltrán	Cuba	42.04	44.24	42.01	44.96	47.46	40.92	47.46	
3rd place, bronze medalist(s)	Gladys González	Venezuela	43.68	46.14	40.72	43.42	x	46.58	46.58	
4	Clementina Díaz	Cuba	44.54	x	40.12	x	x	42.56	44.54	
5	Ivelise Gómez	Dominican Republic	x	38.64	38.68	x	41.72	x	41.72	
6	Evelin Mena	El Salvador	x	x	29.58	34.00	33.02	36.88	36.88	
7	Orlanda Lynch	Suriname	31.54	29.72	x	33.32	34.88	34.86	34.88	

=== Pentathlon ===
7–8 March

The highest mark recorded in each event is highlighted in yellow

Rank	Name	Nationality	100m H	SP	HJ	LJ	200m	Points	Notes
1st place, gold medalist(s)	Ciska Jansen	Netherlands Antilles	15.45	12.23	1.60	6.02	25.11	4014	GR
2nd place, silver medalist(s)	Ángela Carbonell	Cuba	14.80	11.19	1.63	5.78	26.74	3867	
3rd place, bronze medalist(s)	Mercedes Román	Mexico	11.34	10.28	1.50	5.82	25.60	3827	
4	Maritza García	Cuba	15.46	10.70	1.60	5.70	26.36	3749	
5	María Ángeles Cato	Mexico	14.58	9.97	1.45	5.41	25.46	3633	
6	Nancy Martínez	Cuba	14.81	11.43	1.40	5.13	28.20	3370	
7	Cheryl Blackman	Barbados	15.32	7.59	1.40	5.25	26.86	3167	
8	Flora Torres	El Salvador	18.44	9.21	1.30	4.84	26.89	2799	
	Rafaela Flores	Puerto Rico	19.45	8.72	1.30	?	?	DNF	
