= 1971 Central American and Caribbean Championships in Athletics =

- Dates: 14–17 July
- Host city: Kingston, Jamaica
- Venue: National Stadium

The 1971 Central American and Caribbean Championships in Athletics were held at the National Stadium in Kingston, Jamaica between 14–17 July.

== Medal summary ==
=== Men's events ===
Event	Gold		Silver		Bronze	
100 metres (wind: 0.0 m/s)	Don Quarrie; Jamaica	10.2 CR	Lennox Miller; Jamaica	10.2	Pablo Montes; Cuba	10.4
200 metres (wind: 0.0 m/s)	Don Quarrie; Jamaica	20.6 CR	Guillermo González; Puerto Rico	21.3	Pablo Montes; Cuba	21.3
400 metres	Alfred Daley; Jamaica	46.6 CR	Melesio Piña; Mexico	47.4	Raúl Dome; Venezuela	47.6
800 metres	Byron Dyce; Jamaica	1:49.7 CR	Leandro Civil; Cuba	1:49.7	Lennox Stewart; Trinidad and Tobago	1:50.0
1500 metres	Byron Dyce; Jamaica	3:46.8 CR	Antonio Colón; Puerto Rico	3:47.5	Carlos Martínez; Mexico	3:48.2
5000 metres	Héctor Ortiz; Puerto Rico	14:25.6 CR	Rodolfo Gómez; Mexico	14:25.8	Lucirio Garrido; Venezuela	14:30.0
10,000 metres	Valentín Robles; Mexico	31:32.0	Victoriano López; Guatemala	31:41.8	Héctor Ortiz; Puerto Rico	31:53.0
Half marathon	Andrés Romero; Mexico	1:10:24	John Mowatt; Jamaica	1:12:46	Lucas Lara; Cuba	1:12:50
110 metres hurdles (wind: 0.0 m/s)	Juan Morales; Cuba	13.8 CR	Arnaldo Bristol; Puerto Rico	13.9	Godfrey Murray; Jamaica	13.9
400 metres hurdles	Juan García; Cuba	52.1 CR	Francisco Dumeng; Puerto Rico	52.3	Fernando Montelongo; Mexico	52.7
3000 metres steeplechase	Lucirio Garrido; Venezuela	8:58.6 CR	Rigoberto Mendoza; Cuba	8:58.8	José Cobo; Cuba	9:11.6
4 × 100 metres relay	Jamaica; Alfred Daley; Carl Lawson; Don Quarrie; Lennox Miller	39.2 CR	Puerto Rico; Arnaldo Bristol; Jorge Vizcarrondo; Guillermo González; Santiago Antonetti	40.7	Venezuela; Alberto Marchán; Félix Mata; Jesús Rico; Antonio González	40.7
4 × 400 metres relay	Jamaica; Leighton Priestley; Trevor Campbell; Alfred Daley; Garth Case	3:09.0 CR	Cuba; Leandro Civil; Rodobaldo Díaz; Antonio Álvarez; José Triana	3:10.1	Trinidad and Tobago; Pat Marshall; Alfred Logie; Desmond Melville; R. Brown	3:13.3
10,000 m track walk	Lucas Lara; Cuba	47:20.2 CR	Ismael Ávila; Mexico	47:43.8	Raúl González; Mexico	49:35.2
High jump	Pedro Yequez; Venezuela	1.98	Lloyd Scott; Jamaica	1.95	Miguel Durañona; Cuba	1.95
Pole vault	Roberto Moré; Cuba	4.80 CR	Juan Laza; Cuba	4.40	Guillermo González; Puerto Rico	4.30
Long jump	George Swanston; Trinidad and Tobago	7.43	Wilfredo Maisonave; Puerto Rico	7.38	Abelardo Pacheco; Cuba	7.19
Triple jump	Pedro Pérez; Cuba	15.94 CR	Juan Velázquez; Cuba	15.42	Tim Barrett; Bahamas	15.32
Shot put	Benigno Hodelín; Cuba	15.76	Alfredo Leyva; Cuba	15.33	Jorge Marrero; Puerto Rico	14.96
Discus throw	Bárbaro Cañizares; Cuba	55.50 CR	Javier Moreno; Cuba	54.44	Leopold Blake; Jamaica	46.04
Hammer throw	Víctor Suárez; Cuba	56.54	Jesús Fuentes; Cuba	53.98	Pedro Granell; Puerto Rico	53.54
Javelin throw	Juan Jarvis; Cuba	77.20 CR	Amado Morales; Puerto Rico	74.38	Justo Perelló; Cuba	71.40
Decathlon	Orlando Pedroso; Cuba	6779 CR	Jesús Mirabal; Cuba	6692	Dunstan Campbell; Grenada	6105

=== Women's events ===
Event	Gold		Silver		Bronze	
100 metres (wind: -2.1 m/s)	Fulgencia Romay; Cuba	11.6	Silvia Chivás; Cuba	11.6	Rosie Allwood; Jamaica	11.9
200 metres (wind: 0.0 m/s)	Fulgencia Romay; Cuba	23.6 CR	Silvia Chivás; Cuba	23.9	Diva Bishop; Panama	24.1
400 metres	Marilyn Neufville; Jamaica	53.5 CR	Carmen Trustée; Cuba	54.0	Yvonne Saunders; Jamaica	54.3
800 metres	Carmen Trustée; Cuba	2:14.6	Aurelia Pentón; Cuba	2:15.1	Beverly Franklin; Jamaica	2:15.8
1500 metres	Lucía Quiroz; Mexico	4:34.2 CR	Enriqueta Nava; Mexico	4:37.5	Melquises Fonseca; Cuba	4:38.5
100 metres hurdles	Marlene Elejalde; Cuba	13.7 CR	Lourdes Jones; Cuba	14.0	Carmen Smith-Brown; Jamaica	14.1
200 metres hurdles	Lourdes Jones; Cuba	28.0 CR	Raquel Martínez; Cuba	28.2	Enriqueta Basilio; Mexico	29.0
4 × 100 metres relay	Cuba; Silvia Chivás; Marlene Elejarde; Fulgencia Romay; Carmen Valdés	45.4	Jamaica; Rosie Allwood; Debbie Byfield-White; Lelieth Hodges; Marcia Swaby	46.0	Venezuela; Lucia Vaamonde; Adriana Marchena; Zulay Montano; Lourdes Vargas	47.2
4 × 400 metres relay	Cuba; Beatriz Castillo; Marcela Chibás; Aurelia Pentón; Carmen Trustée	3:38.6 CR	Jamaica; Marilyn Neufville; Yvonne Saunders-Mondesire; Ruth Simpson; Beverly Panton	3:41.0	Trinidad and Tobago; Laura Pierre; Joan Porter; June Smith; Cheryl Dyette	4:03.2
High jump	Audrey Reid; Jamaica	1.73 CR	Andrea Bruce; Jamaica	1.70	Marima Rodríguez; Cuba	1.67
Long jump	Marina Samuells; Cuba	5.93	Marcia Garbey; Cuba	5.68	Yvonne Saunders; Jamaica	5.65
Shot put	Carmen Romero; Cuba	14.25 CR	Grecia Hamilton; Cuba	14.04	Orlanda Lynch; Suriname	10.20
Discus throw	Carmen Romero; Cuba	55.24 CR	María Cristina Betancourt; Cuba	49.38	Orlanda Lynch; Suriname	34.02
Javelin throw	Tomasa Núñez; Cuba	51.64 CR	Milagros Bayard; Cuba	41.54	Celina Surga; Venezuela	37.56
Pentathlon	Marlene Elejalde; Cuba	4341 CR	Lucía Vaamonde; Venezuela	4333	Marcia Garbey; Cuba	4122

== Medal table ==
* Host nation (Jamaica)

Rank	Nation	Gold	Silver	Bronze	Total
1	Cuba (CUB)	22	19	10	51
2	Jamaica (JAM)*	9	6	7	22
3	Mexico (MEX)	3	4	4	11
4	Venezuela (VEN)	2	1	5	8
5	Puerto Rico (PUR)	1	7	4	12
6	Trinidad and Tobago (TRI)	1	0	3	4
7	Guatemala (GUA)	0	1	0	1
8	Suriname (NGY)	0	0	2	2
9	Bahamas (BAH)	0	0	1	1
9	Grenada (GRN)	0	0	1	1
9	Panama (PAN)	0	0	1	1
Totals (11 entries)		38	38	38	114
