= Guillermo González (athlete) =

Puerto Rican sprinter (born 1950)

Personal information
- Full name: Guillermo González Zayas
- Nationality: Puerto Rican
- Born: 15 January 1950 (age 76)
- Height: 1.80 m (5 ft 11 in)
- Weight: 71 kg (157 lb)

Sport
- Sport: Sprinting
- Event: 100 metres

Guillermo González Zayas (born 15 January 1950) is a Puerto Rican sprinter. He competed in the men's 100 metres at the 1972 Summer Olympics.

== International competitions ==
Year	Competition	Venue	Position	Event	Notes
Representing Puerto Rico
1969	Central American and Caribbean Championships	Havana, Cuba	3rd	Pole vault	4.10 m
1970	Central American and Caribbean Games	Panama City, Panama	5th	Decathlon	6358 pts
1971	Central American and Caribbean Championships	Kingston, Jamaica	5th	100 m	10.5
1971	Central American and Caribbean Championships	Kingston, Jamaica	2nd	200 m	21.3
1971	Central American and Caribbean Championships	Kingston, Jamaica	2nd	4 × 100 m relay	40.7
1971	Pan American Games	Cali, Colombia	6th	200 m	21.12
1971	Pan American Games	Cali, Colombia	4th	4 × 100 m relay	40.46
1972	Olympic Games	Munich, West Germany	49th (h)	100 m	10.73
1972	Olympic Games	Munich, West Germany	27th (qf)	200 m	21.10
1972	Olympic Games	Munich, West Germany	23rd (h)	4 × 100 m relay	41.34
1973	Central American and Caribbean Championships	Maracaibo, Venezuela	7th (h)	100 m	10.4
1973	Central American and Caribbean Championships	Maracaibo, Venezuela	4th	200 m	20.5
1973	Universiade	Moscow, Soviet Union	13th (h)	100 m	10.76
1973	Universiade	Moscow, Soviet Union	17th (h)	200 m	21.9
1974	Central American and Caribbean Games	Santo Domingo, Dominican Republic	14th (h)	100 m	11.06
1974	Central American and Caribbean Games	Santo Domingo, Dominican Republic	–	Decathlon	DNF

== Personal bests ==
- 100 metres – 10.2 (1971)
- 200 metres – 20.7 (1972)
