= Athletics at the 1975 Pan American Games – Men's 100 metres =

Men's 100 metres at the Pan American Games

The men's 100 metres event at the 1975 Pan American Games was held in Mexico City on 13 and 14 October.

== Medalists ==
Gold	Silver	Bronze
Silvio Leonard; Cuba	Hasely Crawford; Trinidad and Tobago	Hermes Ramírez; Cuba

== Results ==
=== Heats ===
Wind:
Heat 1: 0.0 m/s, Heat 2: -1.6 m/s, Heat 3: -1.0 m/s, Heat 4: -1.4 m/s, Heat 5: 0.0 m/s

Rank	Heat	Name	Nationality	Time	Notes
1	5	James Gilkes	Guyana	10.35	Q
2	1	Silvio Leonard	Cuba	10.41	Q
3	4	Bill Collins	United States	10.42	Q
4	5	Rui da Silva	Brazil	10.46	Q
5	4	Hasely Crawford	Trinidad and Tobago	10.49	Q
6	2	Hermes Ramírez	Cuba	10.51	Q
7	3	Clancy Edwards	United States	10.52	Q
8	4	Nelson dos Santos	Brazil	10.55	Q
9	4	Hugh Fraser	Canada	10.56	q
10	1	Marvin Nash	Canada	10.62	Q
11	3	Gregorio García	Dominican Republic	10.64	Q
12	1	Enrique Almarante	Dominican Republic	10.65	Q
13	5	Michael Fray	Jamaica	10.71	Q
14	3	Clifton Schultz	Guyana	10.72	Q
15	1	Alfred Daley	Jamaica	10.79	
16	1	Rudolph Levarity	Bahamas	10.80	
17	2	Walter Callander	Bahamas	10.81	Q
18	3	Mike Sharpe	Bermuda	10.82	
19	4	Gregory Simons	Bermuda	10.83	
20	2	Gustavo Dubarbier	Argentina	10.85	Q
21	4	Arturo Godoy	Mexico	10.86	
22	2	Edsel Nahr	Netherlands Antilles	10.89	
23	2	Ronald Russell	Virgin Islands	10.90	
24	3	Philippe Étienne	Haiti	10.91	
25	3	Siegfried Regales	Netherlands Antilles	10.98	
26	1	Miguel Verti	Mexico	11.01	
27	1	Ángel Guerreros	Paraguay	11.03	
28	2	Lionel Caero	Bolivia	11.31	
29	5	Melvin Ramírez	Guatemala	11.35	

=== Semifinals ===
Wind:
Heat 1: +1.4 m/s, Heat 2: 0.0 m/s

Rank	Heat	Name	Nationality	Time	Notes
1	1	Silvio Leonard	Cuba	10.15	Q, GR
2	2	James Gilkes	Guyana	10.22	Q
3	2	Hermes Ramírez	Cuba	10.24	Q
4	1	Hasely Crawford	Trinidad and Tobago	10.27	Q
5	1	Clancy Edwards	United States	10.33	Q
6	2	Bill Collins	United States	10.35	Q
7	1	Rui da Silva	Brazil	10.36	Q
8	2	Hugh Fraser	Canada	10.37	Q
9	2	Nelson dos Santos	Brazil	10.39	
10	2	Michael Fray	Jamaica	10.39	
11	1	Marvin Nash	Canada	10.41	
12	1	Gregorio García	Dominican Republic	10.57	
13	1	Clifton Schultz	Guyana	10.58	
14	2	Enrique Almarante	Dominican Republic	10.59	
15	2	Gustavo Dubarbier	Argentina	10.73	
16	1	Walter Callander	Bahamas	10.74	

=== Final ===
Wind: -0.4 m/s

Rank	Name	Nationality	Time	Notes
1st place, gold medalist(s)	Silvio Leonard	Cuba	10.15	=GR
2nd place, silver medalist(s)	Hasely Crawford	Trinidad and Tobago	10.21	
3rd place, bronze medalist(s)	Hermes Ramírez	Cuba	10.34	
4	James Gilkes	Guyana	10.35	
5	Clancy Edwards	United States	10.39	
6	Hugh Fraser	Canada	10.45	
7	Rui da Silva	Brazil	10.46	
8	Bill Collins	United States	10.48	
