= Hermes Ramírez =

Cuban sprinter (1948–2024)

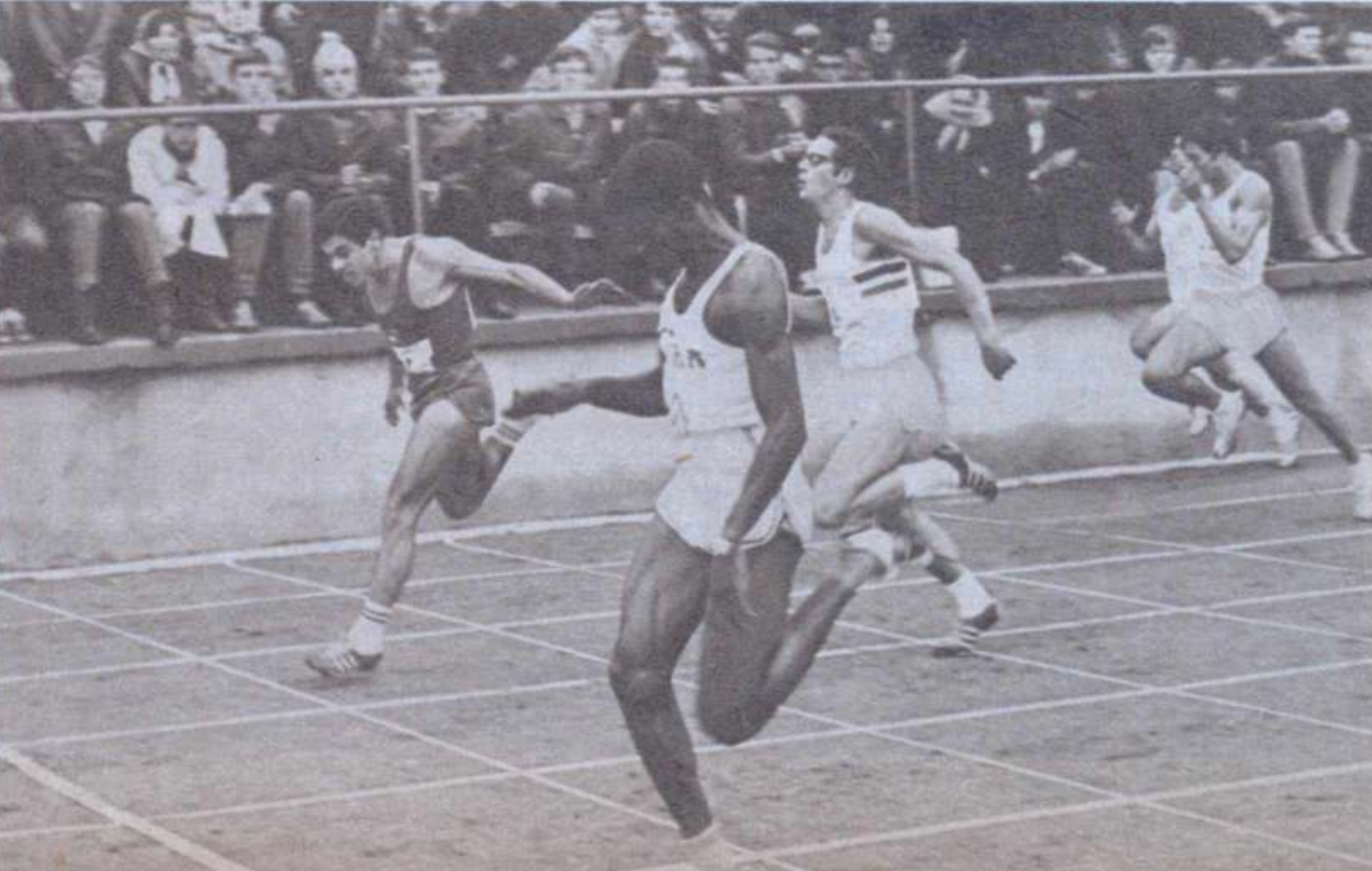

Personal information
- Full name: Hermes Julián Ramírez Limonta
- Born: January 7, 1948 Guantánamo, Cuba
- Died: September 4, 2024 (aged 76)
- Height: 1.78 m (5 ft 10 in)
- Weight: 66 kg (146 lb)
Medal record
Men's athletics
Representing Cuba
Olympic Games
Silver medal – second place	1968 Mexico City	4 x 100 m relay
Pan American Games
Silver medal – second place	1975 Mexico City	4 x 100 m relay

Hermes Ramírez (Hermes Julián Ramírez Limonta; January 7, 1948 – September 4, 2024) was a Cuban sprinter. Together with Juan Morales, Pablo Montes, and Enrique Figuerola he won an Olympic silver medal in 4 x 100 metres relay in Mexico City 1968. His other achievements include four 100 m and 200 m titles at the Central American and Caribbean Championships.

Ramírez died on September 4, 2024, at the age of 76.

== International competitions ==
Year	Competition	Venue	Position	Event	Notes
Representing Cuba
1965	Universiade	Budapest, Hungary	11th (sf)	100 m	10.6
1965	Universiade	Budapest, Hungary	11th (h)	4 × 100 m relay	42.0
1966	Central American and Caribbean Games	San Juan, Puerto Rico	16th (h)	100 m	10.9
1967	Pan American Games	Winnipeg, Canada	3rd	100 m	10.36
1967	Pan American Games	Winnipeg, Canada	2nd	4 × 100 m relay	39.26
1967	Central American and Caribbean Championships	Xalapa, Mexico	1st	100 m	10.5
1967	Central American and Caribbean Championships	Xalapa, Mexico	1st	200 m	21.6
1967	Central American and Caribbean Championships	Xalapa, Mexico	1st	4 × 100 m relay	40.3
1968	Olympic Games	Mexico City, Mexico	9th (sf)	100 m	10.25
1968	Olympic Games	Mexico City, Mexico	2nd	4 × 100 m relay	38.40
1969	Central American and Caribbean Championships	Havana, Cuba	1st	100 m	10.4
1969	Central American and Caribbean Championships	Havana, Cuba	1st	200 m	21.0
1970	Central American and Caribbean Games	Panama City, Panama	2nd	100 m	10.28
1970	Central American and Caribbean Games	Panama City, Panama	3rd	200 m	21.4
1970	Central American and Caribbean Games	Panama City, Panama	1st	4 × 100 m relay	39.4
1971	Central American and Caribbean Championships	Kingston, Jamaica	4th	100 m	10.5
1971	Central American and Caribbean Championships	Kingston, Jamaica	5th	200 m	21.5
1971	Pan American Games	Cali, Colombia	5th	100 m	10.44
1971	Pan American Games	Cali, Colombia	2nd	4 × 100 m relay	39.84
1972	Olympic Games	Munich, West Germany	7th (sf)	4 × 100 m relay	39.04
1973	Central American and Caribbean Championships	Maracaibo, Venezuela	6th	100 m	10.4
1973	Central American and Caribbean Championships	Maracaibo, Venezuela	2nd	4 × 100 m relay	40.2
1975	Pan American Games	Mexico City, Mexico	3rd	100 m	10.34
1975	Pan American Games	Mexico City, Mexico	2nd	4 × 100 m relay	38.46
1976	Olympic Games	Montreal, Canada	5th	4 × 100 m relay	39.01

== Personal bests ==
- 100 metres – 10.10 (+0.5 m/s, Mexico City 1968)
- 200 metres – 20.83 (+1.0 m/s, Warsaw 1972)
