= Walter Callander =

Bahamian sprinter

Personal information
- Full name: Walter Edward Callander
- Nationality: Bahamian
- Born: 30 May 1947 (age 79)
- Height: 1.80 m (5 ft 11 in)
- Weight: 70 kg (154 lb)

Sport
- Sport: Sprinting
- Event: 100 metres

Walter Edward Callander (born 30 May 1947) is a Bahamian sprinter. He competed in the men's 100 metres at the 1972 Summer Olympics.

== International competitions ==
Year	Competition	Venue	Position	Event	Notes
Representing the Bahamas
1971	Central American and Caribbean Championships	Kingston, Jamaica	7th	200 m	22.0
1971	Pan American Games	Cali, Colombia	15th (sf)	200 m	21.75
1971	Pan American Games	Cali, Colombia	6th	4 × 100 m relay	40.92
1972	Olympic Games	Munich, West Germany	32nd (h)	100 m	10.78
1972	Olympic Games	Munich, West Germany	19th (h)	4 × 100 m relay	40.48
1974	Central American and Caribbean Games	Santo Domingo, Dominican Republic	11th (sf)	100 m	11.07
1974	Central American and Caribbean Games	Santo Domingo, Dominican Republic	8th	200 m	22.03
1975	Pan American Games	Mexico City, Mexico	16th (sf)	100 m	10.74
1975	Pan American Games	Mexico City, Mexico	6th (h)	4 × 100 m relay	39.81
1976	Olympic Games	Montreal, Canada	28th (qf)	200 m	21.78
1976	Olympic Games	Montreal, Canada	13th (sf)	4 × 100 m relay	40.53

== Personal bests ==
- 100 metres – 10.74 (1975)
- 200 metres – 21.78 (1974)
