= Marima Rodríguez =

Cuban high jumper

Personal information
- Full name: Marima Rodríguez Cárdenas
- Born: 2 March 1953 (age 73) Palma Soriano, Cuba
- Height: 1.73 m (5 ft 8 in)
- Weight: 64 kg (141 lb)

Sport
- Sport: Athletics
- Event: High jump

Marima Rodríguez Cárdenas (born 2 March 1953) is a Cuban athlete. She competed in the women's high jump at the 1972 Summer Olympics.

Her personal best in the event is 1.83 metres set in 1972.

== International competitions ==
Year	Competition	Venue	Position	Notes
Representing Cuba
1970	Central American and Caribbean Games	Panama City, Panama	3rd	1.64 m
1971	Central American and Caribbean Championships	Kingston, Jamaica	3rd	1.67 m
1971	Pan American Games	Cali, Colombia	5th	1.65 m
1972	Olympic Games	Munich, West Germany	25th (q)	1.73 m
1973	Central American and Caribbean Championships	Maracaibo, Venezuela	2nd	1.69 m
