= Aurelia Pentón =

Cuban athlete

Personal information
- Full name: Aurelia Catalina Pentón Conde
- Born: February 13, 1941 (age 85) Sancti Spíritus, Cuba
Medal record
Women's Athletics
Representing Cuba
Pan American Games
Silver medal – second place	1971 Cali	4x400 m relay
Silver medal – second place	1979 San Juan	4x400 m relay
Bronze medal – third place	1975 Mexico City	4x400 m relay
Bronze medal – third place	1979 San Juan	800 metres
Central American and Caribbean Games
Gold medal – first place	1974 Santo Domingo	400 metres
Gold medal – first place	1978 Medellín	400 metres
Gold medal – first place	1978 Medellín	800 metres
Silver medal – second place	1970 Panama City	400 metres
Silver medal – second place	1974 Santo Domingo	800 metres
Summer Universiade
Bronze medal – third place	1970 Turin	400 metres

Aurelia Catalina Pentón Conde (born February 13, 1941) is a retired track and field athlete from Cuba, who competed in the 400 and 800 metres during her career.

Pentón was born in Sancti Spíritus, and twice represented her native country at the Summer Olympics: 1968 and 1972.

Her time of 50.56, set at altitude in Medellín, Colombia while winning the 1978 Central American and Caribbean Games is the officially ratified masters athletics world record for the W35 400 metres.

== International competitions ==
Year	Competition	Venue	Position	Event	Notes
Representing Cuba
1966	Central American and Caribbean Games	San Juan, Puerto Rico	6th	200 m	26.0
1967	Pan American Games	Winnipeg, Canada	7th	800 m	2:15.45
1967	Central American and Caribbean Championships	Xalapa, Mexico	1st	400 m	57.4
1967	Central American and Caribbean Championships	Xalapa, Mexico	1st	800 m	2:24.1
1968	Olympic Games	Mexico City, Mexico	5th	400 m	52.7
1969	Central American and Caribbean Championships	Havana, Cuba	2nd	400 m	55.3
1969	Central American and Caribbean Championships	Havana, Cuba	3rd	800 m	2:14.9
1970	Central American and Caribbean Games	Panama City, Panama	2nd	400 m	54.3
1970	Central American and Caribbean Games	Panama City, Panama	4th	800 m	2:16.8
1970	Universiade	Turin, Italy	3rd	400 m	53.8
1970	Universiade	Turin, Italy	14th (h)	800 m	2:12.3
1971	Central American and Caribbean Championships	Kingston, Jamaica	4th	400 m	54.4
1971	Central American and Caribbean Championships	Kingston, Jamaica	2nd	800 m	2:15.1
1971	Central American and Caribbean Championships	Kingston, Jamaica	1st	4 × 400 m relay	3:38.6
1971	Pan American Games	Cali, Colombia	4th	400 m	53.62
1971	Pan American Games	Cali, Colombia	2nd	4 × 400 m relay	3:34.04
1972	Olympic Games	Munich, West Germany	10th (sf)	400 m	52.15
1972	Olympic Games	Munich, West Germany	10th (h)	4 × 400 m relay	3:32:4
1973	Central American and Caribbean Championships	Maracaibo, Venezuela	1st	400 m	53.5
1973	Central American and Caribbean Championships	Maracaibo, Venezuela	4th	800 m	2:09.1
1973	Central American and Caribbean Championships	Maracaibo, Venezuela	1st	4 × 400 m relay	3:42.1
1974	Central American and Caribbean Games	Santo Domingo, Dominican Republic	1st	400 m	52.27
1974	Central American and Caribbean Games	Santo Domingo, Dominican Republic	2nd	800 m	2:05.43
1975	Pan American Games	Mexico City, Mexico	3rd	4 × 400 m relay	3:31.65
1977	Central American and Caribbean Championships	Xalapa, Mexico	3rd	400 m	53.05
1977	Central American and Caribbean Championships	Xalapa, Mexico	3rd	800 m	2:09.13
1977	Central American and Caribbean Championships	Xalapa, Mexico	1st	4 × 400 m relay	3:37.50
1977	World Cup	Düsseldorf, West Germany	5th	400 m	52.33^{1}
1977	World Cup	Düsseldorf, West Germany	5th	4 × 400 m relay	3:31.0^{1}
1978	Central American and Caribbean Games	Medellín, Colombia	1st	400 m	50.56
1978	Central American and Caribbean Games	Medellín, Colombia	1st	800 m	2:01.38
1978	Central American and Caribbean Games	Medellín, Colombia	1st	4 × 400 m relay	3:31.34
1979	Pan American Games	San Juan, Puerto Rico	4th	400 m	52.71
1979	Pan American Games	San Juan, Puerto Rico	3rd	800 m	2:02.1
1979	Pan American Games	San Juan, Puerto Rico	2nd	4 × 400 m relay	3:36.3
1979	World Cup	Montreal, Canada	5th	4 × 400 m relay	3:28.50^{1}

^{1}Representing the Americas
