= Juan García (hurdler) =

Cuban hurdler (born 1945)

Personal information
- Full name: Juan García Dumois
- Born: 5 November 1945 (age 81) Banes, Cuba
- Height: 1.83 m (6 ft 0 in)
- Weight: 84 kg (185 lb)

Sport
- Sport: Sprinting
- Event: 400 metres hurdles
Medal record
Representing Cuba
Central American and Caribbean Games
Gold medal – first place	1970 Panama City	400m hurdles
Gold medal – first place	1970 Panama City	4x400m relay

Juan García Dumois (born 5 November 1945) is a Cuban former hurdler who competed in the 1968 Summer Olympics.

== International competitions ==
Year	Competition	Venue	Position	Event	Notes
Representing Cuba
1968	Olympic Games	Mexico City, Mexico	24th (h)	400 m hurdles	51.8
1969	Central American and Caribbean Championships	Havana, Cuba	2nd	400 m hurdles	53.9
1970	Central American and Caribbean Games	Panama City, Panama	1st	400 m hurdles	50.6
1970	Central American and Caribbean Games	Panama City, Panama	1st	4 × 400 m relay	3:06.4
1970	Universiade	Turin, Italy	8th	400 m hurdles	51.7
1971	Central American and Caribbean Championships	Kingston, Jamaica	1st	400 m hurdles	52.1
1971	Pan American Games	Cali, Colombia	5th (h)	400 m hurdles	52.70
1973	Central American and Caribbean Championships	Maracaibo, Venezuela	3rd	400 m hurdles	53.1
1974	Central American and Caribbean Games	Santo Domingo, Dominican Republic	6th	400 m hurdles	52.42

== Personal bests ==
- 400 metres hurdles – 50.6 (1970)
