= Athletics at the 1973 Summer Universiade – Men's 200 metres =

The men's 200 metres event at the 1973 Summer Universiade was held at the Central Lenin Stadium in Moscow on 18, 19 and 20 August.

== Medalists ==
Gold	Silver	Bronze
Pietro Mennea; Italy	Chris Monk; Great Britain	Wardell Gilbreath; United States

== Results ==
=== Heats ===
Wind:
Heat 1: 0.0 m/s, Heat 2: 0.0 m/s, Heat 3: +0.2 m/s, Heat 4: -1.5 m/s, Heat 5: -0.5 m/s, Heat 6: ? m/s

Rank	Heat	Athlete	Nationality	Time	Notes
1	1	Chris Monk	Great Britain	20.87	Q
2	1	Pietro Mennea	Italy	21.09	Q
3	1	Charles Ducasse	France	21.31	q
4	1	Selendorj Oimandahk	Mongolia	22.1	
5	1	Georg Regner	Austria	22.6	
	1	Eduardo González	Mexico	DNF	
1	2	Silvio Leonard	Cuba	21.4	Q
2	2	Gheorghe Dulgheru	Romania	22.0	Q
3	2	Andrew Ratcliffe	Australia	22.08	
4	2	Susumu Shimizu	Japan	22.4	
5	2	José Antônio Rabaca	Brazil	22.8	
6	2	Houshemy Yar Arshadi	Iran	22.95	
7	2	Sam Musoke	Uganda	23.1	
1	3	Wardell Gilbreath	United States	21.03	Q
2	3	Bernd Borth	East Germany	21.7	Q
3	3	Witold Ziendalski	Poland	21.8	q
4	3	Toma Petrescu	Romania	21.9	
5	3	Mohamed Hassan	Iraq	23.1	
6	3	Younis Abdallah Rabee	Kuwait	23.40	
1	4	Luigi Benedetti	Italy	21.31	Q
2	4	Mark Lutz	United States	21.39	Q
3	4	Vladimir Lovetskiy	Soviet Union	21.66	q
4	4	Lambert Micha	Belgium	21.8	
5	4	Uwe Schläfer	West Germany	22.09	
6	4	Wolfgang Rabe	East Germany	22.10	
7	4	Said Marvez Mir	Pakistan	23.8	
1	5	Klaus-Dieter Bieler	West Germany	21.5	Q
2	5	René Metz	France	21.52	Q,
3	5	Aleksandr Zhidkikh	Soviet Union	21.5	q
4	5	Pablo Bandomo	Cuba	21.8	
5	5	Jesús Rohena	Puerto Rico	22.2	
6	5	Doljinsouren Ganbat	Mongolia	23.5	
1	6	Reto Diezi	Switzerland	21.43	Q
2	6	Jerzy Homziuk	Poland	21.9	Q
3	6	Guillermo González	Puerto Rico	21.9	
4	6	Günther Würfel	Austria	22.0	
5	6	Yussif Issa Al-Hasawi	Kuwait	23.1	
6	6	Carlos Abbott	Costa Rica	23.2	
7	6	Michele Komane	Central African Republic	23.6	

=== Semifinals ===
Wind:
Heat 1: 0.0 m/s, Heat 2: +0.1 m/s

Rank	Heat	Athlete	Nationality	Time	Notes
1	1	Pietro Mennea	Italy	20.88	Q
2	1	Silvio Leonard	Cuba	21.10	Q
3	1	Wardell Gilbreath	United States	21.12	Q
4	1	René Metz	France	21.36	Q
5	1	Reto Diezi	Switzerland	21.62	
6	1	Jerzy Homziuk	Poland	21.6	
7	1	Vladimir Lovetskiy	Soviet Union	21.84	
1	2	Chris Monk	Great Britain	20.97	Q
2	2	Charles Ducasse	France	21.05	Q
3	2	Luigi Benedetti	Italy	21.13	Q
4	2	Mark Lutz	United States	21.25	Q
5	2	Aleksandr Zhidkikh	Soviet Union	21.46	
6	2	Bernd Borth	East Germany	21.62	
7	2	Witold Ziendalski	Poland	21.8	
8	2	Gheorghe Dulgheru	Romania	21.9	

=== Final ===
Wind: +0.1 m/s

Rank	Lane	Athlete	Nationality	Time	Notes
1st place, gold medalist(s)	4	Pietro Mennea	Italy	20.56	
2nd place, silver medalist(s)	5	Chris Monk	Great Britain	20.70	
3rd place, bronze medalist(s)	2	Wardell Gilbreath	United States	20.80	
4	3	Charles Ducasse	France	20.82	
5	6	Mark Lutz	United States	20.88	
6	7	Luigi Benedetti	Italy	20.97	
7	1	Silvio Leonard	Cuba	21.11	
8	8	René Metz	France	21.32	
