= Pearson Jordan =

Barbadian sprinter (1950–2020)

Personal information
- Born: 23 October 1950 Speightstown, Saint Peter, Barbados
- Died: 28 March 2020 (aged 69) Dallas, Texas, U.S.
- Height: 1.75 m (5 ft 9 in)
- Weight: 67 kg (148 lb)

Sport
- Sport: Sprinting
- Event: 100 metres

Pearson G. Jordan (23 October 1950 – 28 March 2020) was a Barbadian sprinter. He competed in the men's 100 metres at the 1976 Summer Olympics. Jordan competed for the Louisiana State University Tigers from 1976 to 1979. He was part of the championship 4 × 400 m relay in 1979.

Jordan who was originally from Speightstown, Saint Peter, Barbados, died of complications from COVID-19 on 28 March 2020, at age 69 in Dallas during the COVID-19 pandemic in Texas. Jordan was the first announced death of an Olympian from the COVID-19 pandemic.

== International competitions ==
Year	Competition	Venue	Position	Event	Notes
Representing Barbados
1974	Central American and Caribbean Games	Santo Domingo, Dominican Republic	11th (h)	100 m	11.06
1974	Central American and Caribbean Games	Santo Domingo, Dominican Republic	8th (sf)	200 m	21.74
1976	Olympic Games	Montreal, Canada	51st (h)	100 m	10.95
1976	Olympic Games	Montreal, Canada	16th (h)	4 × 100 m relay	41.15

== Personal bests ==
- 100 metres – 10.3 (1973)
