= Ronald Russell (athlete) =

US Virgin Islands sprinter (1954–2026)

Personal information
- Full name: Ronald E. Russell
- Nationality: American Virgin Islander
- Born: June 10, 1954 Frederiksted, U.S. Virgin Islands
- Died: May 6, 2026 (aged 71) New York City, U.S.
- Height: 1.82 m (6 ft 0 in)
- Weight: 72 kg (159 lb)

Sport
- Sport: Sprinting
- Event: 100 metres

Ronald E. Russell (June 10, 1954 – May 6, 2026) was a sprinter who represented the United States Virgin Islands. He competed in the 100 metres at the 1976 Summer Olympics and the 1984 Summer Olympics. Russell died in New York City on May 6, 2026, at the age of 71.

== International competitions ==
Year	Competition	Venue	Position	Event	Notes
Representing the United States Virgin Islands
1971	Pan American Games	Cali, Colombia	25th (h)	100 m	10.85
1974	Central American and Caribbean Games	Santo Domingo, Dominican Republic	13th (sf)	100 m	11.13
1974	Central American and Caribbean Games	Santo Domingo, Dominican Republic	17th (h)	200 m	22.38 (w)
1975	Pan American Games	Mexico City, Mexico	23rd (h)	100 m	10.90
1975	Pan American Games	Mexico City, Mexico	22nd (h)	200 m	22.40
1976	Olympic Games	Montreal, Canada	59th (h)	100 m	11.22
1979	Pan American Games	San Juan, Puerto Rico	25th (h)	100 m	11.25
1982	Central American and Caribbean Games	Havana, Cuba	6th	4 × 100 m relay	40.92
1984	Olympic Games	Los Angeles, United States	68th (h)	100 m	11.02

== Personal bests ==
- 100 metres – 10.6 (1971)
