= Rafael Tadeo =

Mexican long-distance runner

Personal information
- Full name: Rafael Tadeo Palomares
- Nationality: Mexican
- Born: 28 September 1949 (age 76)
- Height: 1.68 m (5 ft 6 in)
- Weight: 52 kg (115 lb)

Sport
- Sport: Long-distance running
- Event: Marathon

Rafael Tadeo Palomares (born 28 September 1949) is a Mexican long-distance runner. He competed in the marathon at the 1972 Summer Olympics.

== International competitions ==
Year	Competition	Venue	Position	Event	Notes
Representing Mexico
1971	Saint Silvester Road Race	São Paulo, Brazil	1st	8.9 km	23:47
1972	Olympic Games	Munich, West Germany	51st	Marathon	2:35:48
1974	Central American and Caribbean Games	Santo Domingo, Dominican Republic	6th	5000 m	14:15.6
1974	Central American and Caribbean Games	Santo Domingo, Dominican Republic	6th	10,000 m	30:43.6
1975	Pan American Games	Mexico City, Mexico	5th	Marathon	2:34:04

== Personal bests ==
- Marathon – 2:21:54 (1972)
