= Ana Alexander (athlete) =

Cuban long jumper (born 1954)

Personal information
- Full name: Ana Bella Alexander Lamothe
- Born: November 1, 1954 (age 71) Manatí, Las Tunas, Cuba
- Height: 1.73 m (5 ft 8 in)
- Weight: 63 kg (139 lb)
Medal record
Women's Athletics
Representing Cuba
Pan American Games
Gold medal – first place	1975 Mexico City	Long Jump
Silver medal – second place	1979 San Juan	Long Jump

Ana Bella Alexander Lamothe (born November 1, 1954) is a retired female athlete from Cuba, who mainly competed in the women's long jump event during her career.

Her personal best in the event is 6.63 metres set in 1975.

== International competitions ==
Year	Competition	Venue	Position	Event	Notes
Representing Cuba
1973	Central American and Caribbean Championships	Maracaibo, Venezuela	2nd	Long jump	6.02 m
1974	Central American and Caribbean Games	Santo Domingo, Dominican Republic	2nd	Long jump	6.07 m
1975	Pan American Games	Mexico City, Mexico	1st	Long jump	6.63 m
1976	Olympic Games	Montreal, Canada	13th (q)	Long jump	6.20 m
1978	Central American and Caribbean Games	Medellín, Colombia	2nd	Long jump	6.25 m
1979	Pan American Games	San Juan, Puerto Rico	2nd	Long jump	6.31 m
1982	Central American and Caribbean Games	Havana, Cuba	4th	Long jump	6.21 m
