= Francisco Dumeng =

Puerto Rican hurdler

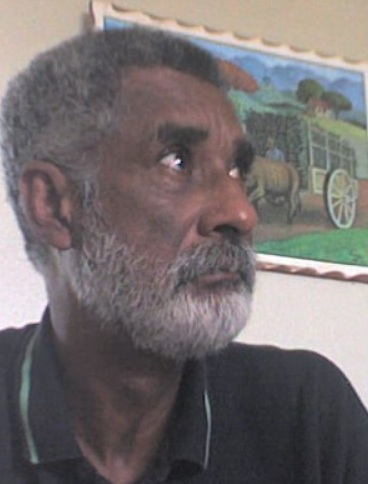

Francisco Dumeng Alers is a retired male track and field athlete from Isabela, Puerto Rico. He won the silver medal in the 110 metres hurdles at the 1971 Central American and Caribbean Championships in Athletics, and the bronze medal at the 1974 Central American and Caribbean Games.

== International competitions ==
| Year | Competition | Venue | Position | Event | Notes |
Representing Puerto Rico
| 1971 | Central American and Caribbean Championships | Kingston, Jamaica | 8th | 110 m hurdles | 14.7 |
| 1971 | Central American and Caribbean Championships | Kingston, Jamaica | 2nd | 400 m hurdles | 52.3 |
| 1971 | Pan American Games | Cali, Colombia | 7th | 110 m hurdles | 53.54 |
| 1974 | Central American and Caribbean Games | Santo Domingo, Dominican Republic | 3rd | 110 m hurdles | 14.10 (w) |
| 1974 | Central American and Caribbean Games | Santo Domingo, Dominican Republic | 9th (h) | 400 m hurdles | 55.80 |
| 1979 | Pan American Games | San Juan, Puerto Rico | 9th (h) | 110 m hurdles | 14.76 |
