= Athletics at the 1979 Pan American Games – Men's 110 metres hurdles =

Men's 110 metres hurdles at the 1979 Pan American Games
- Venue: Estadio Sixto Escobar
- Dates: 9 & 11 July
- Winning time: 13.20

Medalists
Gold medal	Renaldo Nehemiah	United States
Silver medal	Alejandro Casañas	Cuba
Bronze medal	Charles Foster	United States

The men's 110 metres hurdles sprint competition of the athletics events at the 1979 Pan American Games took place on 9 and 11 July at the Estadio Sixto Escobar. The defending Pan American Games champion was Alejandro Casañas of Cuba.

== Records ==
Prior to this competition, the existing world and Pan American Games records were as follows:

World record	Renaldo Nehemiah (USA)	13.00	Westwood, United States	May 6, 1979
Pan American Games record	Earl McCullouch (USA)	13.4	Winnipeg, Canada	1967

== Results ==
KEY:	WR	World Record	GR	Pan American Record

=== Heats ===
Wind:
Heat 1: +0.1 m/s, Heat 2: +0.3 m/s

Rank	Heat	Name	Nationality	Time	Notes
1	1	Renaldo Nehemiah	United States	13.38	Q
2	2	Alejandro Casañas	Cuba	13.53	Q
3	2	Charles Foster	United States	13.72	Q
4	1	Rafael Echevarría	Mexico	14.14	Q
5	1	Dionisio Vera	Cuba	14.27	Q
6	2	Pat Forgarty	Canada	14.37	Q
7	1	Jesús Costas	Puerto Rico	14.46	q
8	1	Mariano Reyes	Dominican Republic	14.53	q
9	2	Francisco Dumeng	Puerto Rico	14.76	
10	1	Alfredo Piza	Chile	14.90	

=== Final ===
Wind: +2.0 m/s

Rank	Name	Nationality	Time	Notes
1st place, gold medalist(s)	Renaldo Nehemiah	United States	13.20	GR
2nd place, silver medalist(s)	Alejandro Casañas	Cuba	13.46	
3rd place, bronze medalist(s)	Charles Foster	United States	13.56	
4	Pat Forgarty	Canada	14.13	
5	Rafael Echevarría	Mexico	14.15	
6	Dionisio Vera	Cuba	14.32	
7	Mariano Reyes	Dominican Republic	14.73	
8	Jesús Costas	Puerto Rico	14.75	
