= Pablo Bandomo =

Cuban sprinter (born 1952)

Personal information
- Born: 22 June 1952
- Died: 19 July 2021 (aged 69)

Sport
- Sport: Track and field
Medal record
Representing Cuba
Central American and Caribbean Games
Gold medal – first place	1974 Santo Domingo	4x100m relay
Silver medal – second place	1974 Santo Domingo	200m

Pablo Aurelio Bandomo Abreú (22 June 1952 – 19 July 2021) was a Cuban sprinter.

== International competitions ==
Year	Competition	Venue	Position	Event	Notes
Representing Cuba
1970	Universiade	Turin, Italy	17th (h)	200 m	21.7
1973	Central American and Caribbean Championships	Maracaibo, Venezuela	3rd	200 m	20.4
1973	Universiade	Moscow, Soviet Union	16th (sf)	200 m	21.8
1974	Central American and Caribbean Games	Santo Domingo, Dominican Republic	2nd	200 m	21.37
1974	Central American and Caribbean Games	Santo Domingo, Dominican Republic	1st	4 × 100 m relay	39.62
