= Cheryl Blackman =

Barbadian hurdler

Personal information
- Nationality: Barbadian
- Born: 28 June 1957 (age 69)
- Height: 1.68 m (5 ft 6 in)
- Weight: 52 kg (115 lb)

Sport
- Sport: Track and field
- Event: 400 metres hurdles

Cheryl Blackman (born 28 June 1957) is a Barbadian hurdler. She competed in the women's 400 metres hurdles at the 1984 Summer Olympics.

== International competitions ==
Year	Competition	Venue	Position	Event	Notes
Representing Barbados
1973	CARIFTA Games (U17)	Port of Spain, Trinidad and Tobago	1st	400 m	58.4
1974	CARIFTA Games (U20)	Kingston, Jamaica	1st	100 m hurdles	15.3
1974	Central American and Caribbean Games	Santo Domingo, Dominican Republic	7th	100 m hurdles	15.47
1974	Central American and Caribbean Games	Santo Domingo, Dominican Republic	6th	4 × 100 m relay	48.46
1974	Central American and Caribbean Games	Santo Domingo, Dominican Republic	7th	Pentathlon	3167 pts
1974	Central American and Caribbean Junior Championships	Maracaibo, Venezuela	3rd	100 m hurdles	14.94
1974	Central American and Caribbean Junior Championships	Maracaibo, Venezuela	3rd	Pentathlon	3038 pts
1975	CARIFTA Games (U20)	Hamilton, Bermuda	1st	100 m hurdles	14.8
1984	Olympic Games	Los Angeles, United States	24th (h)	400 m hurdles	61.19

== Personal bests ==
- 400 metres hurdles – 59.35 (1984)
