= George Calhern =

United States Virgin Islands sprinter

Personal information
- Nationality: American Virgin Islander
- Born: May 9, 1951 (age 75)
- Height: 1.88 m (6 ft 2 in)
- Weight: 75 kg (165 lb)

Sport
- Sport: Sprinting
- Event: 100 metres

George Calhern (born May 9, 1951) is a sprinter who represents the United States Virgin Islands. He competed in the men's 100 metres at the 1972 Summer Olympics.

== International competitions ==
Year	Competition	Venue	Position	Event	Notes
Representing the United States Virgin Islands
1972	Olympic Games	Munich, West Germany	65th (h)	100 m	10.90 (w)
1974	Central American and Caribbean Games	Santo Domingo, Dominican Republic	8th	100 m	11.15
1974	Central American and Caribbean Games	Santo Domingo, Dominican Republic	5th	200 m	21.63 (w)

== Personal bests ==
- 100 metres – 10.98 (1974)
