= Silvio Leonard =

Cuban sprinter

Personal information
- Born: September 20, 1955 (age 71) Cienfuegos, Cienfuegos, Cuba
- Height: 1.73 m (5 ft 8 in)
- Weight: 64 kg (141 lb)

Achievements and titles
- Personal bests: 100 m: 9.98 s NR; 200 m: 20.06 s
Medal record
Men's Athletics
Representing Cuba
Olympic Games
Silver medal – second place	1980 Moscow	100 metres
Pan American Games
Gold medal – first place	1975 Mexico City	100 metres
Gold medal – first place	1979 San Juan	100 metres
Gold medal – first place	1979 San Juan	200 metres
Silver medal – second place	1983 Caracas	4 x 100 metres
Central American and Caribbean Games
Gold medal – first place	1974 Santo Domingo	100 metres
Gold medal – first place	1974 Santo Domingo	200 metres
Gold medal – first place	1978 Medellín	100 metres
Gold medal – first place	1978 Medellín	200 metres
Summer Universiade
Gold medal – first place	1977 Sofia	100 metres
Silver medal – second place	1973 Moscow	100 metres
Silver medal – second place	1977 Sofia	200 metres
Central American and Caribbean Championships
Gold medal – first place	1977 Ponce	200 metres
Silver medal – second place	1973 Maracaibo	200 metres
Silver medal – second place	1977 Ponce	100 metres
Silver medal – second place	1981 Santo Domingo	100 metres
Friendship Games
Silver medal – second place	1984 Moscow	4 x 100 metres
Representing Americas
IAAF World Cup
Gold medal – first place	1979 Montreal	200 metres
Gold medal – first place	1979 Montreal	4 x 100 metres
Silver medal – second place	1979 Montreal	100 metres
Bronze medal – third place	1977 Düsseldorf	100 metres
Bronze medal – third place	1977 Düsseldorf	200 metres
Bronze medal – third place	1977 Düsseldorf	4 x 100 metres

Silvio Leonard Sarría also known as Silvio Leonard Tartabull (born September 20, 1955, in Cienfuegos) is a former sprinter from Cuba. He is remarkable for being the second person to run the 100 meter sprints in less than 10 sconds with electronic timing, being the only Spanish speaking person to have accomplished such a feat.

== Career ==
Leonard first announced his talent when he set a new Cuban 100 metres national junior record in 1973 with a time of 10.24 s. Leonard was successful in the 1974 Central American and Caribbean Games winning the 100 and 200 metres double. He came to the attention of the world when he equalled the then world record for a 100 metres with a hand-timing of 9.9 s on 5 June 1975 in Ostrava, Czechoslovakia. (Note: From 1 January 1977, imperial distances were no longer recognised for world-record purposes by the IAAF.)

Leonard was three-time Pan American Games champion, 1975 100 and 1979 100/200. When winning the title in 1975 he suffered a calamity that could seem comical if it were not for the fact that the outcome for Leonard could have been even worse. Whilst celebrating his win, he fell into the moat around the track at the Estadio Olímpico Universitario in Mexico City. The injury he suffered to his back required surgery and severely hampered his preparations for the 1976 Olympics. In the race itself, Leonard defeated the Trinidadian Hasely Crawford who was to win the Olympic 100 metres title the following year.

Leonard did recover in time to compete at the 1976 Montreal Olympics but there suffered another misfortune. He cut his left leg on broken glass in the Olympic Village. The injury badly affected his running and he was eliminated in the quarter-finals.

In 1977, Leonard was at the peak of his powers. He became the second athlete to run the 100 metres in less than 10 seconds with electronic timing, running in 9.98 s on August 11 in Guadalajara (the first was 1968 Olympic champion Jim Hines), nowadays Leonard stands as the only Spanish-speaking 10-second barrier athlete. Leonard also had good speed endurance which he proved when he was the fastest in the world that year in the 200 metres with a time of 20.08 s. At the inaugural Athletics World Cup that year, Leonard won bronze in both the 100 and 200 metres whilst representing the Americas. On 13 September he equaled the low-altitude world best time for the 100 m of 10.03 s originally set by Jim Hines at the 1968 AAU National Championships commonly known as the "Night of Speed". (Note: The IAAF world records take no account of altitude of the record's venue. However, as it is recognised that sprint events are assisted by altitude, due to decreased air resistance, a separate list is kept of best marks at sea level when they are inferior to the actual world record.) He also won the 1977 100-metre Gold at the World Student Games.

In 1978 he successfully defended his double Golds in the 100/200 metres at the Central American and Caribbean Games. He also set a personal best and world's fastest time at the 200 metres of 20.06 s on 19 June in Warsaw.

In 1979, at the second Athletics World Cup he won the 200 metres and was runner-up in the 100 metres. He was also Cuban champion and won the Soviet 100 metres championship that year.

At the 1980 Summer Olympics Leonard won a silver medal in 100 metres, finishing behind Allan Wells of Great Britain. He then went on to finish 4th in the Olympic 200 metres final in a time of 20.30, narrowly missing out on another medal.

Leonard was never a factor at world level after the 1980 season; there has been no legacy of world-class Cuban sprinters to follow him and his 100 and 200 metres bests are still Cuban records. (Note: As of October 2012.)

He retired in 1985 and is reportedly now a track coach.

== International competitions ==
Year	Competition	Venue	Position	Event	Notes
Representing Cuba
1973	Central American and Caribbean Championships	Maracaibo, Venezuela	1st	200 m	20.3 (w)
1973	Central American and Caribbean Championships	Maracaibo, Venezuela	2nd	4 × 100 m relay	40.2
1973	Universiade	Moscow, Soviet Union	2nd	100 m	10.43
1973	Universiade	Moscow, Soviet Union	7th	200 m	21.11
1974	Central American and Caribbean Games	Santo Domingo, Dominican Republic	1st	100 m	10.49
1974	Central American and Caribbean Games	Santo Domingo, Dominican Republic	1st	200 m	20.99
1974	Central American and Caribbean Games	Santo Domingo, Dominican Republic	1st	4 × 100 m relay	39.62
1975	Pan American Games	Mexico City, Mexico	1st	100 m	10.15
1976	Olympic Games	Montreal, Canada	19th (qf)	100 m	10.59
1976	Olympic Games	Montreal, Canada	5th	4 × 100 m relay	39.01
1977	Central American and Caribbean Championships	Xalapa, Mexico	2nd	100 m	10.43
1977	Central American and Caribbean Championships	Xalapa, Mexico	1st	200 m	20.70
1977	Central American and Caribbean Championships	Xalapa, Mexico	1st	4 × 100 m relay	39.86
1977	Universiade	Sofia, Bulgaria	1st	100 m	10.08
1977	Universiade	Sofia, Bulgaria	2nd	200 m	20.64
1977	Universiade	Sofia, Bulgaria	4th	4 × 100 m relay	39.31
1977	World Cup	Düsseldorf, West Germany	3rd	100 m	10.19^{1}
1977	World Cup	Düsseldorf, West Germany	3rd	200 m	20.30^{1}
1977	World Cup	Düsseldorf, West Germany	3rd	4 × 100 m relay	38.56^{1}
1978	Central American and Caribbean Games	Medellín, Colombia	1st	100 m	10.10
1978	Central American and Caribbean Games	Medellín, Colombia	1st	200 m	20.49
1978	Central American and Caribbean Games	Medellín, Colombia	2nd	4 × 100 m relay	39.44
1979	Spartakiad	Moscow, Soviet Union	1st	100 m	10.30
1979	Pan American Games	San Juan, Puerto Rico	1st	100 m	10.13
1979	Pan American Games	San Juan, Puerto Rico	1st	200 m	20.37 (w)
1979	Pan American Games	San Juan, Puerto Rico	2nd	4 × 100 m relay	39.14
1979	World Cup	Montreal, Canada	2nd	100 m	10.26^{1}
1979	World Cup	Montreal, Canada	1st	200 m	20.34^{1}
1979	World Cup	Montreal, Canada	1st	4 × 100 m relay	38.70^{1}
1980	Olympic Games	Moscow, Soviet Union	2nd	100 m	10.25
1980	Olympic Games	Moscow, Soviet Union	4th	200 m	20.30
1980	Olympic Games	Moscow, Soviet Union	–	4 × 100 m relay	DNF
1981	Central American and Caribbean Championships	Santo Domingo, Dominican Republic	2nd	100 m	10.34
1981	Central American and Caribbean Championships	Santo Domingo, Dominican Republic	3rd	4 × 100 m relay	39.96
1983	Pan American Games	Caracas, Venezuela	2nd	4 × 100 m relay	38.55

^{1}Representing the Americas

== Rankings ==
Leonard was ranked among the best in the world in both the 100 and 200 m sprint events over the incredible spread of 8 seasons from 1973 to 1980, according to the votes of the experts of Track and Field News.

World Rankings
Year	100 m	200 m
1973	9th	-
1974	1st	1st
1975	4th	7th
1976	-	-
1977	4th	4th
1978	1st	4th
1979	2nd	2nd
1980	3rd	7th

== Awards ==
In 2003, Leonard was inducted into the Central American and Caribbean Athletics Hall of Fame.

Sporting positions
Preceded by (United States) Millard Hampton	Men's 200m Best Year Performance; 1977	Succeeded by (United States) Clancy Edwards
