= Marlene Elejarde =

Cuban sprinter (1951–1989)

Personal information
- Full name: Marlene Elejarde Díaz
- Born: June 3, 1951 Marianao, Havana, Cuba
- Died: April 29, 1989 (aged 37) Havana, Cuba
- Height: 1.72 m (5 ft 8 in)
- Weight: 65 kg (143 lb)
Medal record
Women's athletics
Representing Cuba
Olympic Games
Silver medal – second place	1968 Mexico City	4x100 m relay
Bronze medal – third place	1972 Munich	4x100 m relay
Pan American Games
Silver medal – second place	1971 Cali	100 m hurdles
Silver medal – second place	1971 Cali	4x100 m relay
Silver medal – second place	1975 Mexico City	4x100 m relay
Bronze medal – third place	1975 Mexico City	100 m hurdles
Central American and Caribbean Games
Gold medal – first place	1970 Panama City	100 m hurdles
Gold medal – first place	1970 Panama City	pentathlon
Gold medal – first place	1970 Panama City	4x100 m relay
Gold medal – first place	1974 Santo Domingo	100 m hurdles

Marlene Elejarde Díaz (Note: In this Spanish name, the first or paternal surname is Elejarde and the second or maternal family name is Díaz.) (also spelled Elejalde, June 3, 1951 – April 29, 1989) was a Cuban sprinter and hurdler. She made history at the 1968 Summer Olympics in Mexico City by helping Cuba secure a silver medal in the 4 × 100-meter relay. Elejarde achieved multi-medal dominance on the regional stage, notably sweeping three gold medals in the 100-meter hurdles, pentathlon, and the 4 × 100-meter relay at the 1970 Central American and Caribbean Games. Her career ended when she died in a car accident in April 1989 at the age of 37.

== Early life and career ==
She was born on 3 June 1951 in Marianao, Ciudad de La Habana.

Her first Olympics were in the 1968 Summer Olympics, where she won the silver medal at 43.3 seconds in the 4 × 100 meters relay with Fulgencia Romay, Violeta Quesada, and Miguelina Cobián, losing to the team from the United States of America in 42.8 seconds, consisting of Barbara Ferrell, Margaret Bailes, Mildred Netter, and Wyomia Tyus. In the third place, followed by the Soviet Union in 43.3 seconds, consisting of Lyudmila Zharkova, Galina Bukharina, Vera Popkova, and Lyudmila Samotesova. At the event, she also competed in the 80 meters hurdles but only placed 4th in heat 2 of round 1 in three rounds

At the 1970 Central American and Caribbean Games, she won three gold medals in all the sports he competed in. She won gold medals in the 100 m hurdles, the pentathlon, and the 4 × 100 meters relay at the Olympics alongside her teammates in Olympic. Quesada was replaced by Cristina Hechevarría with a time of 44.7 seconds, followed by Panama and Mexico.

== Death ==
She died in a car accident on 29 April 1989.

== International competitions ==
Year	Competition	Venue	Position	Event	Notes
Representing Cuba
1966	Central American and Caribbean Games	San Juan, Puerto Rico	4th	80 m hurdles	11.7
1967	Central American and Caribbean Championships	Xalapa, Mexico	1st	80 m hurdles	11.6
1967	Central American and Caribbean Championships	Xalapa, Mexico	1st	Pentathlon	4186 pts
1968	Pan American Games	Mexico City, Mexico	16th (h)	80 m hurdles	10.9
1968	Pan American Games	Mexico City, Mexico	2nd	4 × 100 m relay	43.36
1970	Central American and Caribbean Games	Panama City, Panama	1st	100 m hurdles	13.9 (w)
1970	Central American and Caribbean Games	Panama City, Panama	1st	4 × 100 m relay	44.7
1970	Central American and Caribbean Games	Panama City, Panama	1st	Pentathlon	4534 pts
1971	Central American and Caribbean Championships	Kingston, Jamaica	1st	100 m hurdles	13.7
1971	Central American and Caribbean Championships	Kingston, Jamaica	1st	4 × 100 m relay	45.4
1971	Central American and Caribbean Championships	Kingston, Jamaica	1st	Pentathlon	4341 pts
1971	Pan American Games	Cali, Colombia	2nd	100 m hurdles	13.54
1971	Pan American Games	Cali, Colombia	2nd	4 × 100 m relay	45.01
1971	Pan American Games	Cali, Colombia	–	Pentathlon	DNF
1972	Pan American Games	Munich, West Germany	3rd	4 × 100 m relay	43.36
1973	Central American and Caribbean Championships	Maracaibo, Venezuela	1st	100 m hurdles	13.9
1973	Central American and Caribbean Championships	Maracaibo, Venezuela	1st	200 m hurdles	28.0 (w)
1973	Central American and Caribbean Championships	Maracaibo, Venezuela	1st	4 × 100 m relay	45.9
1973	Universiade	Moscow, Soviet Union	9th (h)	100 m hurdles	14.0
1974	Central American and Caribbean Games	Santo Domingo, Dominican Republic	5th	100 m	12.03
1974	Central American and Caribbean Games	Santo Domingo, Dominican Republic	1st	100 m hurdles	14.53
1974	Central American and Caribbean Games	Santo Domingo, Dominican Republic	1st	4 × 100 m relay	44.90
1975	Pan American Games	Mexico City, Mexico	3rd	100 m hurdles	13.80
1975	Pan American Games	Mexico City, Mexico	2nd	4 × 100 m relay	43.65

== Personal bests ==
- 100 metres – 11.83 (1976)
- 80 metres hurdles – 10.99 (1968)
