= Francisco Menocal =

Nicaraguan sprinter

Personal information
- Born: Francisco Mauricio Menocal; 3 December 1945 (age 80) Managua, Nicaragua
- Height: 1.75 m (5 ft 9 in)
- Weight: 70 kg (154 lb)

Sport
- Sport: Sprinting
- Event: 400 metres

Francisco Mauricio Menocal (born 3 December 1945) is a Nicaraguan sprinter. He competed in the 400 metres at the 1968 Summer Olympics and the 1972 Summer Olympics.

== International competitions ==
Year	Competition	Venue	Position	Event	Notes
Representing Nicaragua
1968	Olympic Games	Mexico City, Mexico	52nd (h)	400 m	49.14
1968	Olympic Games	Mexico City, Mexico	40th (h)	800 m	1:58.9
1971	Central American Championships	San José, Costa Rica	2nd	400 m	49.8
1972	Olympic Games	Munich, West Germany	62nd (h)	400 m	50.96
1972	Olympic Games	Munich, West Germany	56 (h)	800 m	1:58.6
1973	Central American Games	Guatemala City, Guatemala	3rd	400 m	
1973	Central American Games	Guatemala City, Guatemala	2nd	400 m hurdles	
1974	Central American and Caribbean Games	Santo Domingo, Dominican Republic	17th (h)	400 m	51.03
1974	Central American and Caribbean Games	Santo Domingo, Dominican Republic	17th (h)	800 m	1:56.84
1974	Central American and Caribbean Games	Santo Domingo, Dominican Republic	10th (h)	400 m hurdles	59.80
1976	Olympic Games	Montreal, Canada	41st (h)	1500 m	4:12.47

== Personal bests ==
- 400 metres – 49.14 (1968)
- 800 metres – 1:56.6 (1972)
