= Rigoberto Mendoza (marathon) =

Rigoberto Mendoza Pérez (born January 4, 1946) is a retired male long-distance and steeplechase runner from Cuba. He won the gold medal in the Marathon at the 1975 Pan American Games and competed for his native country at the 1976 Summer Olympics, finishing in 33rd place. He set his personal best (2:21.01) in the classic distance in 1975.

== International competitions ==
| Year | Competition | Venue | Position | Event | Notes |
Representing Cuba
| 1966 | Central American and Caribbean Games | San Juan, Puerto Rico | 8th | 5000 m | NT |
| 1966 | Central American and Caribbean Games | San Juan, Puerto Rico | 3rd | 3000 m s'chase | 9:38.4 |
| 1969 | Central American and Caribbean Championships | Havana, Cuba | 2nd | 3000 m s'chase | 9:06.6 |
| 1970 | Central American and Caribbean Games | Panama City, Panama | 6th | 5000 m | 14:48.8 |
| 1970 | Central American and Caribbean Games | Panama City, Panama | 3rd | 3000 m s'chase | 8:55.2 |
| 1971 | Central American and Caribbean Championships | Kingston, Jamaica | 4th | 5000 m | 14:30.6 |
| 1971 | Central American and Caribbean Championships | Kingston, Jamaica | 2nd | 3000 m s'chase | 8:58.8 |
| 1973 | Central American and Caribbean Championships | Maracaibo, Venezuela | 2nd | 3000 m s'chase | 8:52.6 |
| 1974 | Central American and Caribbean Games | Santo Domingo, Dominican Republic | 9th | 5000 m | 14:42.0 |
| 1974 | Central American and Caribbean Games | Santo Domingo, Dominican Republic | 4th | 3000 m s'chase | 8:55.8 |
| 1975 | Central American and Caribbean Championships | Ponce, Puerto Rico | 2nd | 10,000 m | 30:07.1 |
| 1975 | Central American and Caribbean Championships | Ponce, Puerto Rico | 2nd | Half marathon | 1:08:03 |
| 1975 | Pan American Games | Mexico City, Mexico | 1st | Marathon | 2:25:03 |
| 1976 | Olympic Games | Montréal, Canada | 33rd | Marathon | 2:22:43 |
