= Masters W35 400 metres world record progression =

This is the progression of world record improvements of the 400 metres W35 division of Masters athletics.

Key

Incomplete information Pending

Hand	Auto	Athlete	Nationality	Birthdate	Location	Date
	49.46	Allyson Felix	United States	18 November 1985	Tokyo	6 August 2021
	49.89	Allyson Felix	United States	18 November 1985	Tokyo	4 August 2021
	50.02	Allyson Felix	United States	18 November 1985	Eugene, Oregon	20 June 2021
	50.14	Novlene Williams-Mills	Jamaica	26 April 1982	Kingston, Jamaica	25 June 2017
	50.27	Jearl Miles Clark	United States	4 September 1966	Madrid	20 September 2002
	50.37	Jearl Miles Clark	United States	4 September 1966	Monaco	19 July 2002
	50.45	Jearl Miles Clark	United States	4 September 1966	Rethymno	7 July 2002
	50.45	Jearl Miles Clark	United States	4 September 1966	Palo Alto	8 June 2002
	50.56 A	Aurelia Penton	Cuba	18 February 1943	Medellín	15 July 1978
