= Athletics at the 1975 Pan American Games – Men's marathon =

Men's marathon at the Pan American Games

The men's marathon event at the 1975 Pan American Games was held in Mexico City on 20 October.

== Results ==
Rank	Name	Nationality	Time	Notes
1st place, gold medalist(s)	Rigoberto Mendoza	Cuba	2:25:03	
2nd place, silver medalist(s)	Chuck Smead	United States	2:25:32	
3rd place, bronze medalist(s)	Tom Howard	Canada	2:25:45	
4	Héctor Rodríguez	Colombia	2:31:33	
5	Rafael Tadeo	Mexico	2:34:04	
6	Jairo Cubillos	Colombia	2:37:10	
7	José de Jesús	Puerto Rico	2:39:22	
8	Rafael Pérez	Costa Rica	2:43:10	
9	Ricardo Condori	Bolivia	2:45:15	
10	Hugo Vargas	Costa Rica	2:48.54	
11	Fulgencio Hernández	Guatemala	2:51.19	
12	César Pastrano	Ecuador	3:07.00	
	Luis Hernández	Mexico	DNF	
	Carlos Cuque López	Guatemala	DNF	
	Ricardo Rojas	United States	DNF	
	José Bordon González	Cuba	DNS	
