= Marcia Trotman =

Barbadian sprinter (born 1955)

Personal information
- Nationality: Barbadian
- Born: 1 September 1955 (age 70)

Sport
- Sport: Sprinting
- Event: 200 metres

Marcia Trotman (born 1 September 1955) is a Barbadian sprinter. She competed in the women's 200 metres at the 1972 Summer Olympics.
