= Alfred Daley =

Jamaican sprinter (born 1949)

Alfred Daley (born 18 November 1949) is a Jamaican former sprinter who competed in three consecutive Summer Olympics, in the Munich 1972 Summer Olympics, the Montreal 1976 Summer Olympics and the Moscow 1980 Summer Olympics.

Daley ran in international, local Jamaican, and USA competitions representing the Jamaica national team in three Olympics, the NCAA at Seton Hall University, Essex County College, and as a member of the New York Athletics Club. In addition to the Olympics, Daley competed in the Central American Caribbean Games, the Penn Relays and New York's Melrose Games.

His greatest individual honour was the 400 metres sprint title at the 1971 Central American and Caribbean Championships in Athletics, which he took in a championship record time of 46.6 seconds. He returned to win a bronze medal at that competition in 1975. He was also part of the gold medal-winning Jamaican 4×100 metres relay squad at the 1971 Pan American Games, as well as the silver medal team in the 4×400 metres relay.

On April 7, 1984, Daley was enshrined in the Seton Hall University Athletic Hall of Fame.
