= George Swanston =

Trinidad and Tobago long jumper

Personal information
- Nationality: Trinidad and Tobago
- Born: 19 November 1950 (age 75)

Sport
- Sport: Athletics
- Event: Long jump

George Swanston (born 19 November 1950) is a Trinidad and Tobago athlete. He competed in the men's long jump at the 1976 Summer Olympics.
