= Richard Hardware =

Jamaican sprinter (1950–1987)

Personal information
- Nationality: Jamaican
- Born: 4 December 1950
- Died: September 1987 (aged 36–37)
- Height: 1.83 m (6 ft 0 in)
- Weight: 77 kg (170 lb)

Sport
- Sport: Sprinting
- Event: 200 metres

Richard Hardware (4 December 1950 – September 1987) was a Jamaican sprinter. He competed in the men's 200 metres at the 1972 Summer Olympics.

Hardware was born on 4 December 1950. His mother was Caslin Hardware and he had one brother, Michael Hardware.

He was an All-American sprinter for the Adelphi Panthers track and field team. He twice finished in the top three at the NCAA championships.

Hardware died in September 1987, aged 36.

== Personal bests ==
- 200 metres – 20.76 (1972)
