= Andrea Bruce =

Jamaican high jumper (born 1955)

Personal information
- Nationality: Jamaican
- Born: 10 July 1955 (age 71)

Sport
- Sport: Athletics
- Event: High jump

Andrea Bruce (born 10 July 1955) is a Jamaican athlete. She competed in the women's high jump at the 1972 Summer Olympics, making it to the final round and placing ninth.

== Athletics ==
Bruce attended Prairie View A&M University, where she competed on the track and field team. She won the 400-meter hurdles at the 1974 USA Outdoor Track and Field Championships.

She placed second in the high jump in the 1975 USA Indoor Track and Field Championships.
