= Lorna Forde =

Barbadian sprinter (born 1952)

Personal information
- Nationality: Barbadian
- Born: 24 June 1952 (age 73)

Sport
- Sport: Sprinting
- Event: 100 metres

Lorna Forde-Mitchell (born 24 June 1952) is a Barbadian sprinter. She competed in the women's 100 metres and women's 400 metres at the 1976 Summer Olympics. Forde competed in the 4 × 400 metres relay at the 1972 Summer Olympics. Forde won bronze in the 400 metres and finished seventh in the 200 metres at the 1975 Pan American Games.

Forde was also an accomplished AIAW sprinter for the LIU Brooklyn Blackbirds track and field team. She was inducted into the LIU Brooklyn Hall of Fame in 2000.
