= Laura Pierre =

Trinidadian sprinter

Personal information
- Nationality: Trinidad and Tobago
- Born: 13 January 1956 (age 69)

Sport
- Sport: Sprinting
- Event: 200 metres

Laura Pierre-James (born 13 January 1956) is a Trinidad and Tobago sprinter. She competed in the women's 200 metres at the 1972 Summer Olympics. She was the first woman to represent Trinidad and Tobago at the Olympics.
