= Kim Rowe =

Jamaican sprinter (born 1952)

Personal information
- Nationality: Jamaican
- Born: 17 December 1952 (age 73)
- Height: 1.79 m (5 ft 10 in)
- Weight: 72 kg (159 lb)

Sport
- Sport: Sprinting
- Event: 400 metres

Kim Rowe (born 17 December 1952) is a Jamaican sprinter. He competed in the men's 4 × 400 metres relay at the 1972 Summer Olympics.

Rowe competed for the Michigan Wolverines track and field team in the NCAA.
