= María Cristina Betancourt =

Cuban discus thrower (born 1947)

María Cristina Betancourt Ramírez (born 15 December 1947) is a retired Cuban discus thrower, born in Havana. Her personal best throw was 66.54 metres, achieved in February 1981 in Havana.

In 1983, she was tested positively for doping during the Pan American Games and subsequently received a lifetime ban.

== Achievements ==
Year	Competition	Venue	Position	Notes
Representing Cuba
1970	Central American and Caribbean Games	Panama City, Panama	2nd	
1971	Pan American Games	Cali, Colombia	2nd	
1974	Central American and Caribbean Games	Santo Domingo, Dominican Republic	2nd	
1975	Pan American Games	Mexico City, Mexico	2nd	
1976	Olympic Games	Montréal, Canada	7th	
1978	Central American and Caribbean Games	Medellín, Colombia	2nd	
1979	Pan American Games	San Juan, Puerto Rico	2nd	
1979	World Cup	Montréal, Canada	3rd	
1982	Central American and Caribbean Games	Havana, Cuba	1st	
