= Venezuela at the 1972 Summer Olympics =

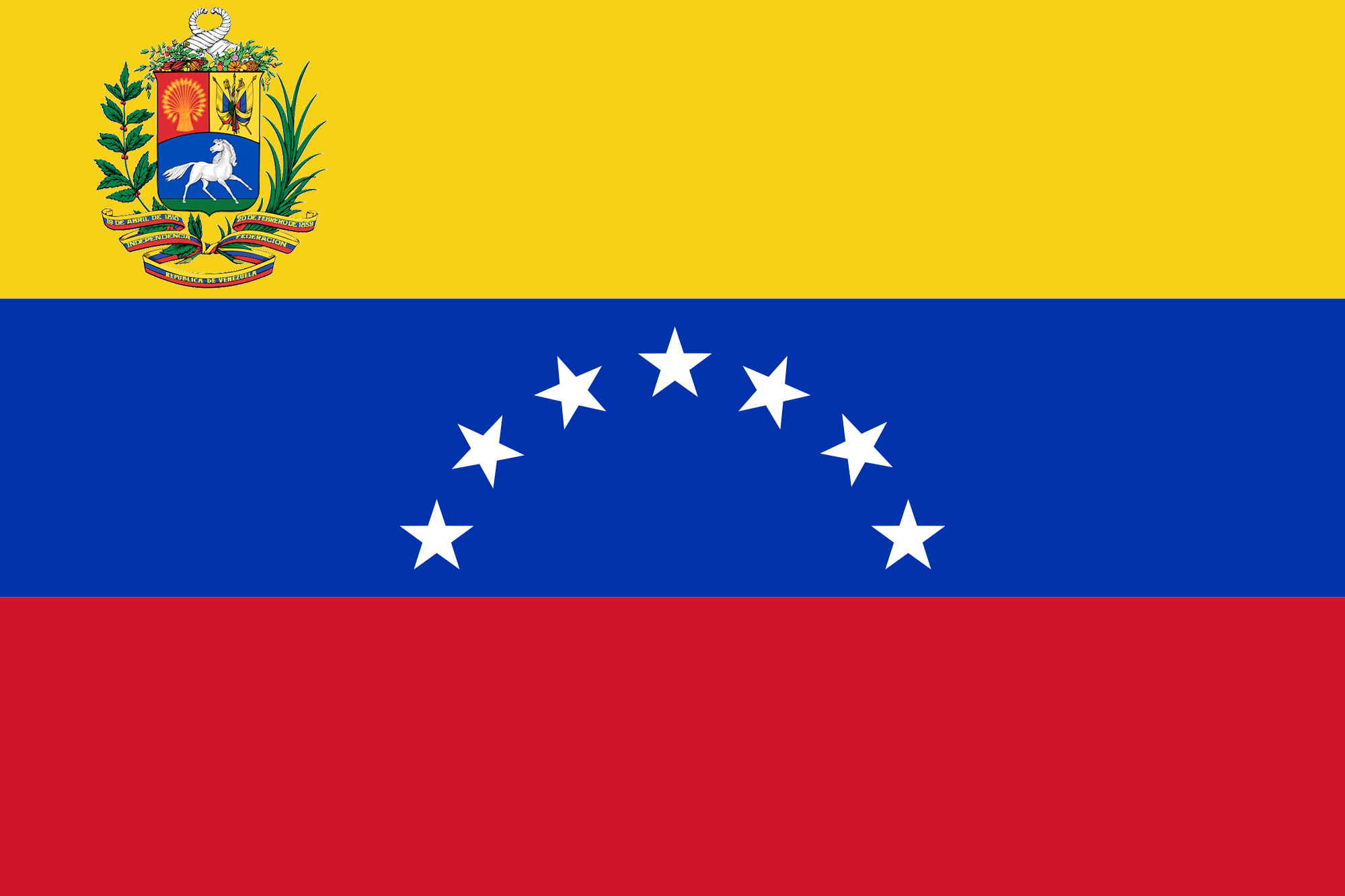
- IOC code: VEN
- NOC: Venezuelan Olympic Committee

in Munich
- Competitors: 23 (20 men and 3 women) in 4 sports
- Flag bearer: Francisco Rodríguez
- Medals: Gold 0 Silver 0 Bronze 0 Total 0

Summer Olympics appearances (overview)
- 1948; 1952; 1956; 1960; 1964; 1968; 1972; 1976; 1980; 1984; 1988; 1992; 1996; 2000; 2004; 2008; 2012; 2016; 2020; 2024

Venezuela competed at the 1972 Summer Olympics in Munich, West Germany. 23 competitors, 20 men and 3 women, took part in 27 events in 4 sports.

== Athletics ==
Men's 100 metres

- Felix Mata

- First Heat – 10.73s (→ did not advance)

Men's 400 metres

- Eric Phillips

- Heat – 46.74 (→ did not advance)

Men's 800 metres

- Héctor López

- Heat – 1:50.8 (→ did not advance)

Men's 4 × 100 m Relay

- Humberto Galea, Felix Mata, Alberto Marchan, and Jesus Rico

- Heat – 39.74s
- Semifinals – 39.74s (→ did not advance)

== Boxing ==
Men's Light Flyweight (– 48 kg)

- Francisco Rodríguez

- First Round – Lost to Dennis Talbot (AUS), KO-2

Men's Light Middleweight (– 71 kg)

- Alfredo Lemus

- First Round – Bye
- Second Round – Lost to Emeterio Villanueva (MEX), 1:4

== Shooting ==
Two male shooters represented Venezuela in 1972.

25 m pistol

- Víctor Francis

50 m rifle, prone

- Agustin Rangel

== Swimming ==
Men's 100m Freestyle

- Jorge van Baien

- Heat – 57.20s (→ did not advance)

Men's 200m Freestyle

- Gerardo Vera

- Heat – 1:57.33 (→ did not advance)
