= Jairo Cubillos =

Colombian athlete

Personal information
- Full name: Jairo Cubillos Ramírez
- Nationality: Colombian
- Born: 20 August 1954 (age 71)
- Height: 1.68 m (5 ft 6 in)
- Weight: 64 kg (141 lb)

Sport
- Sport: Long-distance running
- Event: Marathon

Jairo Cubillos Ramírez (born 20 August 1954) is a Colombian long-distance runner. He competed in the marathon at the 1976 Summer Olympics.

== International competitions ==
Year	Competition	Venue	Position	Event	Notes
Representing Colombia
1974	Central American and Caribbean Games	Santo Domingo, Dominican Republic	7th	10,000 m	30:52.0
1974	South American Championships	Santiago, Chile	5th	5000 m	14:38.2
1974	South American Championships	Santiago, Chile	3rd	10,000 m	30:25.6
1975	Pan American Games	Mexico City, Mexico	6th	Marathon	2:37:10
1976	Olympic Games	Montreal, Canada	48th	Marathon	2:29:04
1977	Bolivarian Games	La Paz, Bolivia	1st	1500 m	3:58.3
1977	Bolivarian Games	La Paz, Bolivia	2nd	5000 m	15:42.5
1977	South American Championships	Montevideo, Uruguay	5th	1500 m	3:55.8
1979	South American Championships	Bucaramanga, Colombia	7th	1500 m	3:50.9
1979	South American Championships	Bucaramanga, Colombia	7th	5000 m	14:53.8

== Personal bests ==
- Marathon – 2:23:21 (1976)
