= Eusebio Cardoso =

Paraguayan long-distance runner (1950–2018)

Personal information
- Full name: Eusebio Cardoso Asunción
- Nationality: Paraguayan
- Born: 15 August 1950
- Died: 14 September 2018 (aged 68)
- Height: 1.72 m (5 ft 8 in)
- Weight: 67 kg (148 lb)

Sport
- Sport: Long-distance running
- Event: Marathon

Eusebio Cardoso Asunción (15 August 1950 – 14 September 2018) was a Paraguayan long-distance runner. He competed in the marathon at the 1976 Summer Olympics.

His personal best in the marathon was 2:27:23 set in 1976.

== International competitions ==
| Year | Competition | Venue | Position | Event | Notes |
Representing Paraguay
| 1974 | South American Championships | Santiago, Chile | 11th (h) | 1500 m | 4:10.7 |
| 1974 | South American Championships | Santiago, Chile | 7th | Marathon | 2:58:57 |
| 1976 | Olympic Games | Montreal, Canada | 43rd | Marathon | 2:27:22 |
| 1977 | South American Championships | Montevideo, Uruguay | 7th | Marathon | 2:47:34 |
