= 1974 South American Championships in Athletics – Results =

These are the results of the 1974 South American Championships in Athletics which took place at the Estadio Nacional in Santiago, Chile, between 16 and 21 April.

== Men's results ==
=== 100 metres ===
Heats – 16 April

| Rank | Heat | Name | Nationality | Time | Notes |
|---|---|---|---|---|---|
| 1 | 1 | Jesús Rico | Venezuela | 10.8 | Q |
| 2 | 1 | Tito Fernández | Chile | 10.8 | Q |
| 3 | 1 | Jorge Mathias | Brazil | 10.8 | Q |
| 4 | 1 | Gustavo Dubarbier | Argentina | 10.9 | Q |
| 5 | 1 | Angel Guerreros | Paraguay | 11.0 | |
| 6 | 1 | José Pérez | Peru | 11.2 | |
| 1 | 2 | Rui da Silva | Brazil | 10.6 | Q |
| 2 | 2 | José Chacín | Venezuela | 10.6 | Q |
| 3 | 2 | Juan Rodolfo Rieder | Paraguay | 10.7 | Q |
| 4 | 2 | Iván Moreno | Chile | 10.8 | Q |
| 5 | 2 | Carlos Martínez | Argentina | 10.9 | |
| 6 | 2 | Amador Reyes | Peru | 11.0 | |

Final – 17 April

| Rank | Name | Nationality | Time | Notes |
|---|---|---|---|---|
| 1st place, gold medalist(s) | Rui da Silva | Brazil | 10.5 | |
| 2nd place, silver medalist(s) | Jesús Rico | Venezuela | 10.5 | |
| 3rd place, bronze medalist(s) | José Chacín | Venezuela | 10.6 | |
| 4 | Iván Moreno | Chile | 10.6 | |
| 5 | Juan Rodolfo Rieder | Paraguay | 10.7 | |
| 6 | Jorge Mathias | Brazil | 10.8 | |
| 7 | Gustavo Dubarbier | Argentina | 10.8 | |
| 8 | Tito Fernández | Chile | 11.0 | |

=== 200 metres ===
Heats – 18 April

| Rank | Heat | Name | Nationality | Time | Notes |
|---|---|---|---|---|---|
| 1 | 1 | Víctor Patíñez | Venezuela | 21.4 | Q |
| 2 | 1 | Rui da Silva | Brazil | 21.6 | Q |
| 3 | 1 | Iván Moreno | Chile | 22.0 | Q |
| 4 | 1 | Alfredo Milano | Argentina | 22.4 | Q |
| 5 | 1 | José Pérez | Peru | 22.4 | |
| 6 | 1 | Angel Guerreros | Paraguay | 22.7 | |
| 7 | 1 | Edmundo Flores | Uruguay | 23.1 | |
| 1 | 2 | Erick Phillips | Venezuela | 21.6 | Q |
| 2 | 2 | Claudio Muñoz | Chile | 22.1 | Q |
| 3 | 2 | Gustavo Dubarbier | Argentina | 22.2 | Q |
| 4 | 2 | Roberto González | Peru | 22.3 | Q |
| 5 | 2 | Modesto García | Paraguay | 22.6 | |
| 6 | 2 | Jorge Mathias | Brazil | 23.0 | |

Final – 19 April

| Rank | Name | Nationality | Time | Notes |
|---|---|---|---|---|
| 1st place, gold medalist(s) | Rui da Silva | Brazil | 21.2 | |
| 2nd place, silver medalist(s) | Erick Phillips | Venezuela | 21.5 | |
| 3rd place, bronze medalist(s) | Víctor Patíñez | Venezuela | 21.7 | |
| 4 | Iván Moreno | Chile | 21.8 | |
| 5 | Gustavo Dubarbier | Argentina | 22.0 | |
| 6 | Claudio Muñoz | Chile | 22.0 | |
| 7 | Alfredo Milano | Argentina | 22.1 | |
| 8 | Roberto González | Peru | 22.2 | |

=== 400 metres ===
Heats – 16 April

| Rank | Heat | Name | Nationality | Time | Notes |
|---|---|---|---|---|---|
| 1 | 1 | Erick Phillips | Venezuela | 46.6 | Q |
| 2 | 1 | Pedro Teixeira | Brazil | 48.5 | Q |
| 3 | 1 | Ariel Santolaya | Chile | 49.0 | Q |
| 4 | 1 | Francisco Rojas Soto | Paraguay | 49.1 | Q |
| 5 | 1 | José Pérez | Argentina | 52.1 | |
| 1 | 2 | Víctor Patíñez | Venezuela | 48.4 | Q |
| 2 | 2 | Aroldo Evangelista da Silva | Brazil | 48.7 | Q |
| 3 | 2 | Carlos Bertotti | Argentina | 49.3 | Q |
| 4 | 2 | Claudio Muñoz | Chile | 50.1 | Q |
| 5 | 2 | Edmundo Torres | Uruguay | 51.3 | |
| 6 | 2 | Ricardo Derene | Paraguay | 53.0 | |

Final – 17 April

| Rank | Name | Nationality | Time | Notes |
|---|---|---|---|---|
| 1st place, gold medalist(s) | Víctor Patíñez | Venezuela | 46.6 | |
| 2nd place, silver medalist(s) | Erick Phillips | Venezuela | 46.8 | |
| 3rd place, bronze medalist(s) | Pedro Teixeira | Brazil | 48.1 | |
| 4 | Claudio Muñoz | Chile | 48.1 | |
| 5 | Aroldo Evangelista da Silva | Brazil | 48.3 | |
| 6 | Ariel Santolaya | Chile | 48.7 | |
| 7 | Carlos Bertotti | Argentina | 48.8 | |
| 8 | Francisco Rojas Soto | Paraguay | 49.4 | |

=== 800 metres ===
Heats – 17 April

| Rank | Heat | Name | Nationality | Time | Notes |
|---|---|---|---|---|---|
| 1 | 1 | Héctor López | Venezuela | 1:53.2 | Q |
| 2 | 1 | Darcy Pereira | Brazil | 1:54.0 | Q |
| 3 | 1 | Roberto Salmona | Chile | 1:54.3 | Q |
| 4 | 1 | Omar Amdematten | Argentina | 1:58.2 | Q |
| 5 | 1 | Ricardo Derene | Paraguay | 2:01.5 | |
| 1 | 2 | Carlos Intaschi | Argentina | 1:51.4 | Q, PB |
| 2 | 2 | Wilfredys León | Venezuela | 1:52.8 | Q |
| 3 | 2 | Reinel Suárez | Colombia | 1:53.3 | Q |
| 4 | 2 | Patricio Urrutia | Chile | 1:54.1 | Q |
| 5 | 2 | Juan Aguilar | Uruguay | 1:55.4 | |
| 6 | 2 | Gilberto da Silva | Brazil | 1:56.7 | |

Final – 18 April

| Rank | Name | Nationality | Time | Notes |
|---|---|---|---|---|
| 1st place, gold medalist(s) | Héctor López | Venezuela | 1:50.4 | |
| 2nd place, silver medalist(s) | Darcy Pereira | Brazil | 1:50.6 | |
| 3rd place, bronze medalist(s) | Reinel Suárez | Colombia | 1:51.6 | |
| 4 | Carlos Intaschi | Argentina | 1:51.7 | |
| 5 | Wilfredys León | Venezuela | 1:51.8 | |
| 6 | Omar Amdematten | Argentina | 1:52.7 | |
| 7 | Patricio Urrutia | Chile | 1:53.5 | |
| 8 | Roberto Salmona | Chile | 1:54.5 | |

=== 1500 metres ===
Heats – 19 April

| Rank | Heat | Name | Nationality | Time | Notes |
|---|---|---|---|---|---|
| 1 | 1 | José González | Venezuela | 3:58.7 | Q |
| 2 | 1 | Víctor Ríos | Chile | 3:58.7 | Q |
| 3 | 1 | José Romão Silva | Brazil | 3:59.3 | Q |
| 4 | 1 | Reinel Suárez | Colombia | 3:59.4 | Q |
| 5 | 1 | Leonardo Espínola | Argentina | 3:59.4 | |
| 6 | 1 | Eusebio Cardoso | Paraguay | 4:10.7 | |
| 1 | 2 | Jesús Barrero | Colombia | 4:00.7 | Q |
| 2 | 2 | Darcy Pereira | Brazil | 4:01.8 | Q |
| 3 | 2 | Fernando Sotomayor | Chile | 4:02.9 | Q |
| 4 | 2 | Omar Amdematten | Argentina | 4:04.5 | Q |
| 5 | 2 | Hernán Rizzo | Venezuela | 4:08.1 | |

Final – 20 April

| Rank | Name | Nationality | Time | Notes |
|---|---|---|---|---|
| 1st place, gold medalist(s) | José González | Venezuela | 3:48.8 | |
| 2nd place, silver medalist(s) | Darcy Pereira | Brazil | 3:51.2 | |
| 3rd place, bronze medalist(s) | Omar Amdematten | Argentina | 3:52.6 | |
| 4 | Jesús Barrero | Colombia | 3:53.2 | |
| 5 | José Romão Silva | Brazil | 3:58.1 | |
| 6 | Fernando Sotomayor | Chile | 4:03.0 | |
| 7 | Reinel Suárez | Colombia | 4:07.8 | |
| 8 | Víctor Ríos | Chile | 4:14.5 | |

=== 5000 metres ===
18 April

| Rank | Name | Nationality | Time | Notes |
|---|---|---|---|---|
| 1st place, gold medalist(s) | Edmundo Warnke | Chile | 14:17.6 | |
| 2nd place, silver medalist(s) | Jairo Correa | Colombia | 14:22.4 | |
| 3rd place, bronze medalist(s) | José Romão Silva | Brazil | 14:22.8 | |
| 4 | Lucirio Garrido | Venezuela | 14:25.2 | |
| 5 | Jairo Cubillos | Colombia | 14:38.2 | |
| 6 | Ricardo Montero | Chile | 14:43.0 | |
| 7 | Juan Adolfo Carrizo | Argentina | 14:44.4 | |
| 8 | Elói Schleder | Brazil | 14:47.2 | |
| 9 | Efraín Manquel | Argentina | 15:02.0 | |

=== 10,000 metres ===
16 April

| Rank | Name | Nationality | Time | Notes |
|---|---|---|---|---|
| 1st place, gold medalist(s) | Jairo Correa | Colombia | 29:27.0 | |
| 2nd place, silver medalist(s) | Edmundo Warnke | Chile | 29:32.8 | |
| 3rd place, bronze medalist(s) | Jairo Cubillos | Colombia | 30:25.6 | |
| 4 | Lucirio Garrido | Venezuela | 30:31.2 | |
| 5 | Juan Adolfo Carrizo | Argentina | 30:42.6 | |
| 6 | José Ramírez | Chile | 31:28.2 | |
| 7 | Adolfo Olivera | Argentina | 32:04.6 | |
| 8 | Hugo Gavino | Peru | 32:35.0 | |

=== Marathon ===
20 April

| Rank | Name | Nationality | Time | Notes |
|---|---|---|---|---|
| 1st place, gold medalist(s) | José Ramírez | Chile | 2:30:42 | |
| 2nd place, silver medalist(s) | Gilberto Serna | Colombia | 2:32:27 | |
| 3rd place, bronze medalist(s) | Orides Alves | Brazil | 2:34:36 | |
| 4 | Francisco de Barros | Brazil | 2:40:02 | |
| 5 | Mario Valdivia | Chile | 2:41:59 | |
| 6 | Alberto Ríos | Argentina | 2:53:48 | |
| 7 | Eusebio Cardoso | Paraguay | 2:58:57 | |
| | Juan Fernando Molina | Argentina | DNF | |
| | Santiago Barón | Colombia | DNF | |

=== 110 metres hurdles ===
Heats – 20 April

| Rank | Heat | Name | Nationality | Time | Notes |
|---|---|---|---|---|---|
| 1 | 1 | Enrique Rendón | Venezuela | 14.9 | Q |
| 2 | 1 | Alfredo Guzmán | Chile | 15.0 | Q |
| 3 | 1 | José Calvi | Argentina | 15.5 | Q |
| 4 | 1 | Márcio Lomónaco | Brazil | 15.6 | Q |
| 1 | 2 | Óscar Marín | Venezuela | 14.9 | Q |
| 2 | 2 | Ignacio Mediano | Chile | 15.0 | Q |
| 3 | 2 | Geraldo Rodrigues | Brazil | 15.0 | Q |
| 4 | 2 | Roberto González | Peru | 15.3 | Q |
| 5 | 2 | Marcelo Tiberi | Argentina | 15.6 | |

Final – 21 April

| Rank | Name | Nationality | Time | Notes |
|---|---|---|---|---|
| 1st place, gold medalist(s) | Óscar Marín | Venezuela | 14.6 | |
| 2nd place, silver medalist(s) | Márcio Lomónaco | Brazil | 14.9 | |
| 3rd place, bronze medalist(s) | Roberto González | Peru | 15.0 | |
| 4 | Alfredo Guzmán | Chile | 15.0 | |
| 5 | Enrique Rendón | Venezuela | 15.1 | |
| 6 | Ignacio Mediano | Chile | 15.3 | |
| 7 | José Calvi | Argentina | 16.0 | |
| | Geraldo Rodrigues | Brazil | ? | |

=== 400 metres hurdles ===
Heats – 18 April

| Rank | Heat | Name | Nationality | Time | Notes |
|---|---|---|---|---|---|
| 1 | 1 | Moisés Zambrano | Venezuela | 54.2 | Q |
| 2 | 1 | Dorival Negrisoli | Brazil | 54.6 | Q |
| 3 | 1 | Juan Santiago Gordón | Chile | 55.4 | Q |
| 4 | 1 | Marcelo Tiberi | Argentina | 56.9 | Q |
| 5 | 1 | Bienvenido Sosa | Paraguay | 1:00.2 | |
| | 1 | Fabio Zuñiga | Colombia | DQ | |
| 1 | 2 | Francisco Rojas Soto | Paraguay | 53.3 | Q |
| 2 | 2 | Aroldo Evangelista da Silva | Brazil | 54.2 | Q |
| 3 | 2 | Jorge Gómez | Venezuela | 54.9 | Q |
| 4 | 2 | Ignacio Mediano | Chile | 54.9 | Q |
| 5 | 2 | Amador Reyes | Peru | 54.9 | |
| 6 | 2 | Rubén Buscalia | Argentina | 57.6 | |

Final – 19 April

| Rank | Name | Nationality | Time | Notes |
|---|---|---|---|---|
| 1st place, gold medalist(s) | Francisco Rojas Soto | Paraguay | 52.1 | |
| 2nd place, silver medalist(s) | Dorival Negrisoli | Brazil | 53.1 | |
| 3rd place, bronze medalist(s) | Juan Santiago Gordón | Chile | 53.5 | |
| 4 | Moisés Zambrano | Venezuela | 53.9 | |
| 5 | Jorge Gómez | Venezuela | 54.1 | |
| 6 | Aroldo Evangelista da Silva | Brazil | 55.4 | |
| 7 | Ignacio Mediano | Chile | 55.4 | |
| 8 | Marcelo Tiberi | Argentina | 55.6 | |

=== 3000 metres steeplechase ===
21 April

| Rank | Name | Nationality | Time | Notes |
|---|---|---|---|---|
| 1st place, gold medalist(s) | José González | Venezuela | 8:59.4 | CR |
| 2nd place, silver medalist(s) | Jorge Grosser | Chile | 9:00.0 | |
| 3rd place, bronze medalist(s) | Lucirio Garrido | Venezuela | 9:01.2 | |
| 4 | José Romão Silva | Brazil | 9:07.6 | |
| 5 | Rafael Baracaldo | Colombia | 9:08.4 | |
| 6 | Ricardo Montero | Chile | 9:08.4 | |
| 7 | Francisco Vega | Peru | 9:30.0 | |
| 8 | Alberto Cavanna | Argentina | 9:34.6 | |
| 11 | Domingo Amaison | Argentina | NT | |

=== 4 × 100 metres relay ===
21 April

| Rank | Nation | Competitors | Time | Notes |
|---|---|---|---|---|
| 1st place, gold medalist(s) | Brazil | João Francisco, Jorge Mathias, Luiz Gonzaga da Silva, Rui da Silva | 40.3 | |
| 2nd place, silver medalist(s) | Venezuela | Jesús Rico, José Chacín, Erick Phillips, Víctor Patíñez | 40.7 | |
| 3rd place, bronze medalist(s) | Argentina | Carlos Martínez, Carlos Bertotti, Gustavo Dubarbier, Alfredo Milano | 41.1 | |
| 4 | Paraguay | Angel Guerreros, Juan Rodolfo Rieder, Modesto García, Francisco Rojas Soto | 41.3 | |
| 5 | Chile | Alfredo Edwards, Tito Fernández, Iván Moreno, Vergara | 41.4 | |
| 6 | Uruguay | | 44.0 | |

=== 4 × 400 metres relay ===
21 April

| Rank | Nation | Competitors | Time | Notes |
|---|---|---|---|---|
| 1st place, gold medalist(s) | Venezuela | Héctor López, Erick Phillips, Cruz Padrón, John Alexander | 3:10.7 | CR |
| 2nd place, silver medalist(s) | Argentina | Rubén Buscalia, José Pérez, Carlos Intaschi, Carlos Bertotti | 3:12.7 | |
| 3rd place, bronze medalist(s) | Chile | Francisco Bozzo, Germán Jorquera, Ariel Santolaya, Claudio Muñoz | 3:12.8 | |
| 4 | Brazil | Pedro Teixeira, Aroldo Evangelista da Silva, Dorival Negrisoli, Darcy Pereira | 3:13.1 | |
| 5 | Paraguay | Francisco Rojas Soto, Modesto García, Bienvenido Sosa, Ricardo Derene | 3:27.7 | |

=== 20 kilometres walk ===
21 April

| Rank | Name | Nationality | Time | Notes |
|---|---|---|---|---|
| 1st place, gold medalist(s) | Adalberto Scorza | Argentina | 1:46:24 | CR |
| 2nd place, silver medalist(s) | Rito Molina | Argentina | 1:48:27 | |
| 3rd place, bronze medalist(s) | Antonio Moraga | Chile | 1:49:00 | |
| 4 | Ricardo Nüske | Brazil | 1:50:31 | |
| 5 | Juan Yañez | Chile | 1:52:31 | |
| | Fernando Elias | Brazil | DNF | |

=== High jump ===
21 April

| Rank | Name | Nationality | Result | Notes |
|---|---|---|---|---|
| 1st place, gold medalist(s) | Luis Arbulú | Peru | 2.06 | CR |
| 2nd place, silver medalist(s) | Luis Barrionuevo | Argentina | 2.06 | CR |
| 3rd place, bronze medalist(s) | Roberto Abugattás | Peru | 2.03 | |
| 4 | Óscar Rodríguez | Chile | 2.03 | |
| 5 | José Ernesto Dalmastro | Argentina | 1.95 | |
| 6 | Alfredo Silva | Chile | 1.90 | |
| 7 | João Carlos de Oliveira | Brazil | 1.85 | |

=== Pole vault ===
20 April

| Rank | Name | Nationality | Result | Notes |
|---|---|---|---|---|
| 1st place, gold medalist(s) | Ciro Valdés | Colombia | 4.40 | |
| 2nd place, silver medalist(s) | Luis Cárdenas | Peru | 4.20 | |
| 3rd place, bronze medalist(s) | Tulio Moya | Chile | 4.00 | |
| 4 | Félix Woelflin | Argentina | 4.00 | |
| 5 | Armando Chiamulera | Brazil | 3.90 | |
| 6 | Juan Rossetti | Argentina | 3.90 | |
| 7 | Sérgio Rodrigues | Brazil | 3.70 | |
| | Fernando Hoces | Chile | DQ | |

=== Long jump ===
17 April

| Rank | Name | Nationality | Result | Notes |
|---|---|---|---|---|
| 1st place, gold medalist(s) | Emilio Mazzeo | Argentina | 7.29 | |
| 2nd place, silver medalist(s) | Ronaldo Lobato | Brazil | 7.21 | |
| 3rd place, bronze medalist(s) | João Carlos de Oliveira | Brazil | 7.17 | |
| 4 | Benigno Chourio | Venezuela | 7.15 | |
| 5 | Iván Moreno | Chile | 7.10 | |
| 6 | Enrique Naranjo | Chile | 6.94 | |
| 7 | Edgar Moreno | Venezuela | 6.87 | |
| 8 | Juan Adolfo Turri | Argentina | 6.75 | |

=== Triple jump ===
16 April

| Rank | Name | Nationality | Result | Notes |
|---|---|---|---|---|
| 1st place, gold medalist(s) | João Carlos de Oliveira | Brazil | 16.34 | =CR |
| 2nd place, silver medalist(s) | Nelson Prudêncio | Brazil | 16.09 | |
| 3rd place, bronze medalist(s) | Edgar Moreno | Venezuela | 15.16 | |
| 4 | Emilio Mazzeo | Argentina | 15.10 | |
| 5 | Francisco Pichott | Chile | 14.97 | |
| 6 | Roberto dos Santos | Uruguay | 14.55 | |
| 7 | Enio Arrieta | Venezuela | 14.38 | |
| 8 | Walter Herrero | Argentina | 14.10 | |

=== Shot put ===
16 April

| Rank | Name | Nationality | Result | Notes |
|---|---|---|---|---|
| 1st place, gold medalist(s) | Juan Adolfo Turri | Argentina | 17.09 | CR |
| 2nd place, silver medalist(s) | Nelson Fernandes | Brazil | 15.96 | |
| 3rd place, bronze medalist(s) | José Carreño | Venezuela | 15.81 | |
| 4 | José Carlos Jacques | Brazil | 15.72 | |
| 5 | Jesús Ramos | Venezuela | 14.98 | |
| 6 | Darwin Piñeyrúa | Uruguay | 14.42 | |
| 7 | José Alberto Vallejo | Argentina | 14.05 | |
| 8 | Luis Bustamante | Chile | 14.04 | |

=== Discus throw ===
17 April

| Rank | Name | Nationality | Result | Notes |
|---|---|---|---|---|
| 1st place, gold medalist(s) | Hernán Haddad | Chile | 47.12 | |
| 2nd place, silver medalist(s) | José Carlos Jacques | Brazil | 46.56 | |
| 3rd place, bronze medalist(s) | Esteban Drapich | Argentina | 46.52 | |
| 4 | Nelson Fernandes | Brazil | 45.96 | |
| 5 | Héctor Rivero | Argentina | 45.70 | |
| 6 | Julio Alexander | Venezuela | 44.68 | |
| 7 | Jorge Quintero | Venezuela | 43.12 | |
| 8 | Herman Strutz | Chile | 42.48 | |

=== Hammer throw ===
20 April

| Rank | Name | Nationality | Result | Notes |
|---|---|---|---|---|
| 1st place, gold medalist(s) | Darwin Piñeyrúa | Uruguay | 62.99 | CR |
| 2nd place, silver medalist(s) | José Alberto Vallejo | Argentina | 61.55 | |
| 3rd place, bronze medalist(s) | Celso de Moraes | Brazil | 59.34 | |
| 4 | Humberto Cáceres | Chile | 52.07 | |
| 5 | Pelayo Quintana | Venezuela | 50.52 | |
| 6 | Carlos Ermter | Chile | 50.23 | |
| 7 | Orlando de Mello | Brazil | 48.72 | |
| 8 | Tulio Tebaldi | Peru | 48.53 | |

=== Javelin throw ===
21 April

| Rank | Name | Nationality | Result | Notes |
|---|---|---|---|---|
| 1st place, gold medalist(s) | Mario Sotomayor | Colombia | 62.99 | |
| 2nd place, silver medalist(s) | Paulo de Faria | Brazil | 66.04 | |
| 3rd place, bronze medalist(s) | Humberto Vianna | Brazil | 65.32 | |
| 4 | Jorge Peña | Chile | 63.72 | |
| 5 | Adolfo Leiva | Chile | 61.14 | |
| 6 | Néstor Pietrobelli | Argentina | 59.58 | |
| 7 | Alberto Morinigo | Paraguay | 43.68 | |

=== Decathlon ===
18–19 April – 1962 tables (1985 conversions given with *)

The highest mark recorded in each event is highlighted in yellow

| Rank | Athlete | Nationality | 100m | LJ | SP | HJ | 400m | 110m H | DT | PV | JT | 1500m | Points | Conv. | Notes |
|---|---|---|---|---|---|---|---|---|---|---|---|---|---|---|---|
| 1st place, gold medalist(s) | Ramón Montezuma | Venezuela | 11.4 | 6.50 | 12.38 | 1.85 | 50.7 | 15.8 | 43.10 | 3.70 | 54.12 | 4:40.3 | 7000 | 6814* | |
| 2nd place, silver medalist(s) | Tito Steiner | Argentina | 11.3 | 6.53 | 13.50 | 1.85 | 50.5 | 15.5 | 41.64 | 3.30 | 50.22 | 4:37.6 | 6964 | 6779* | |
| 3rd place, bronze medalist(s) | Alfredo Silva | Chile | 11.3 | 6.67 | 12.13 | 1.91 | 51.7 | 15.5 | 36.56 | 3.50 | 43.40 | 4:37.0 | 6772 | 6579* | |
| 4 | Sérgio Rodrigues | Brazil | 11.6 | 6.30 | 13.53 | 1.85 | 53.8 | 16.1 | 40.20 | 3.40 | 53.88 | 5:00.8 | 6567 | 6369* | |
| 5 | Hans Miethe | Chile | 11.5 | 6.68 | 11.16 | 1.75 | 53.1 | 15.9 | 34.28 | 3.70 | 44.22 | 5:03.5 | 6287 | 6099* | |
| 6 | Adalberto Morales | Argentina | 11.9 | 6.39 | 11.73 | 1.88 | 53.7 | 16.3 | 38.82 | 3.40 | 44.30 | 4:54.3 | 6191 | 6008* | |
| 7 | Moacir Fagundes | Brazil | 11.3 | 6.10 | 11.73 | 1.80 | 55.0 | 16.6 | 34.06 | 3.30 | 54.90 | 5:09.3 | 6152 | 5947* | |
| | Enio Arrieta | Venezuela | 11.8 | NM | 10.22 | 1.65 | 56.4 | ? | – | – | – | – | DNF | | |

== Women's results ==
=== 100 metres ===
Heats – 18 April

| Rank | Heat | Name | Nationality | Time | Notes |
|---|---|---|---|---|---|
| 1 | 1 | Angela Godoy | Argentina | 12.2 | Q |
| 2 | 1 | Conceição Geremias | Brazil | 12.2 | Q |
| 3 | 1 | Elsa Antúnez | Venezuela | 12.3 | Q |
| 4 | 1 | Flavia Villar | Chile | 12.9 | Q |
| 5 | 1 | Edith Noeding | Peru | 13.2 | |
| 1 | 2 | Elsy Rivas | Colombia | 12.0 | Q |
| 2 | 2 | Geralda de Souza | Brazil | 12.2 | Q |
| 3 | 2 | Belkis Fava | Argentina | 12.2 | Q |
| 4 | 2 | Carmela Bolívar | Peru | 12.3 | Q |
| 5 | 2 | Leslie Cooper | Chile | 12.4 | |
| 6 | 2 | Carmen Álvarez | Venezuela | 12.5 | |

Final – 19 April

| Rank | Name | Nationality | Time | Notes |
|---|---|---|---|---|
| 1st place, gold medalist(s) | Conceição Geremias | Brazil | 12.1 | |
| 2nd place, silver medalist(s) | Elsy Rivas | Colombia | 12.1 | |
| 3rd place, bronze medalist(s) | Belkis Fava | Argentina | 12.1 | |
| 4 | Angela Godoy | Argentina | 12.1 | |
| 5 | Elsa Antúnez | Venezuela | 12.2 | |
| 6 | Geralda de Souza | Brazil | 12.3 | |
| 7 | Carmela Bolívar | Peru | 12.5 | |
| 8 | Flavia Villar | Chile | 12.7 | |

=== 200 metres ===
Heats – 16 April

| Rank | Heat | Name | Nationality | Time | Notes |
|---|---|---|---|---|---|
| 1 | 1 | Elsy Rivas | Colombia | 24.5 | Q |
| 2 | 1 | Conceição Geremias | Brazil | 25.0 | Q |
| 3 | 1 | Belkis Fava | Argentina | 25.2 | Q |
| 4 | 1 | Victoria Roa | Chile | 25.3 | Q |
| 5 | 1 | Rosemarie Boeck | Peru | 26.1 | |
| 6 | 1 | Carmen Álvarez | Venezuela | 26.4 | |
| 7 | 1 | Carmen Echegaray | Uruguay | 26.9 | |
| 1 | 2 | Angela Godoy | Argentina | 25.0 | Q |
| 2 | 2 | Eucaris Caicedo | Colombia | 25.2 | Q |
| 3 | 2 | Josefa Vicent | Uruguay | 25.3 | Q |
| 4 | 2 | Elsa Antúnez | Venezuela | 25.4 | Q |
| 5 | 2 | Carmela Bolívar | Peru | 25.5 | |
| 6 | 2 | Ivette Barbosa | Brazil | 25.6 | |
| 7 | 2 | Aurora Sáenz | Chile | 26.9 | |

Final – 17 April

| Rank | Name | Nationality | Time | Notes |
|---|---|---|---|---|
| 1st place, gold medalist(s) | Elsy Rivas | Colombia | 24.1 | |
| 2nd place, silver medalist(s) | Angela Godoy | Argentina | 24.7 | |
| 3rd place, bronze medalist(s) | Conceição Geremias | Brazil | 24.7 | |
| 4 | Belkis Fava | Argentina | 24.8 | |
| 5 | Eucaris Caicedo | Colombia | 25.0 | |
| 6 | Victoria Roa | Chile | 25.1 | |
| 7 | Elsa Antúnez | Venezuela | 25.2 | |
| 8 | Josefa Vicent | Uruguay | 25.3 | |

=== 400 metres ===
Heats – 18 April

| Rank | Heat | Name | Nationality | Time | Notes |
|---|---|---|---|---|---|
| 1 | 1 | Eucaris Caicedo | Colombia | 56.1 | Q |
| 2 | 1 | Victoria Roa | Chile | 57.7 | Q |
| 3 | 1 | Adriana Marchena | Venezuela | 58.6 | Q |
| 4 | 1 | Valdéa Chagas | Brazil | 1:00.4 | Q |
| 5 | 1 | Margarita Grun | Uruguay | 1:01.7 | |
| 6 | 1 | María Cristina Sinitsch | Argentina | 1:02.3 | |
| 1 | 2 | Rosângela Verissimo | Brazil | 59.2 | Q |
| 1 | 2 | Josefa Vicent | Uruguay | 59.2 | Q |
| 3 | 2 | Elsa Antúnez | Venezuela | 59.3 | Q |
| 4 | 2 | Graciela Ghelfi | Argentina | 59.4 | Q |
| 5 | 2 | Oriana Salas | Chile | 59.6 | |
| 6 | 2 | Beatriz Pacheco | Peru | 1:01.5 | |

Final – 19 April

| Rank | Name | Nationality | Time | Notes |
|---|---|---|---|---|
| 1st place, gold medalist(s) | Eucaris Caicedo | Colombia | 56.1 | |
| 2nd place, silver medalist(s) | Adriana Marchena | Venezuela | 57.0 | |
| 3rd place, bronze medalist(s) | Rosângela Verissimo | Brazil | 57.1 | |
| 4 | Victoria Roa | Chile | 58.2 | |
| 5 | Elsa Antúnez | Venezuela | 58.3 | |
| 6 | Valdéa Chagas | Brazil | 58.5 | |
| 7 | Graciela Ghelfi | Argentina | 59.8 | |
| | Josefa Vicent | Uruguay | ? | |

=== 800 metres ===
Heats – 20 April

| Rank | Heat | Name | Nationality | Time | Notes |
|---|---|---|---|---|---|
| 1 | 1 | Rosângela Verissimo | Brazil | 2:20.1 | Q |
| 2 | 1 | Julia González | Venezuela | 2:20.8 | Q |
| 3 | 1 | Carmen Oyé | Chile | 2:21.3 | Q |
| 4 | 1 | María Cristina Sinitsch | Argentina | 2:21.9 | Q |
| 5 | 1 | Laura Oyhanctábal | Uruguay | 2:24.0 | |
| 1 | 2 | Ana María Nielsen | Argentina | 2:14.7 | Q |
| 2 | 2 | Eucaris Caicedo | Colombia | 2:22.9 | Q |
| 3 | 2 | Adriana Marchena | Venezuela | 2:23.4 | Q |
| 4 | 2 | Tamara Ramírez | Chile | 2:23.5 | Q |
| 5 | 2 | Maria Benedita Guimarães | Brazil | 2:23.6 | |

Final – 21 April

| Rank | Name | Nationality | Time | Notes |
|---|---|---|---|---|
| 1st place, gold medalist(s) | Ana María Nielsen | Argentina | 2:11.9 | CR |
| 2nd place, silver medalist(s) | Rosângela Verissimo | Brazil | 2:12.6 | |
| 3rd place, bronze medalist(s) | Carmen Oyé | Chile | 2:13.9 | |
| 4 | Adriana Marchena | Venezuela | 2:16.1 | |
| 5 | María Cristina Sinitsch | Argentina | 2:16.2 | |
| 6 | Eucaris Caicedo | Colombia | 2:20.1 | |
| 7 | Tamara Ramírez | Chile | 2:25.4 | |
| | Julia González | Venezuela | ? | |

=== 1500 metres ===
18 April

| Rank | Name | Nationality | Time | Notes |
|---|---|---|---|---|
| 1st place, gold medalist(s) | Carmen Oyé | Chile | 4:32.1 | AR |
| 2nd place, silver medalist(s) | Ana María Nielsen | Argentina | 4:33.5 | |
| 3rd place, bronze medalist(s) | Iris Fernández | Argentina | 4:41.7 | |
| 4 | Julia González | Venezuela | 4:53.9 | |
| 5 | Eleonora de Mendonça | Brazil | 4:54.6 | |
| 6 | Andrea Gere | Chile | 5:04.5 | |
| 7 | Antônia Batista | Brazil | 5:13.9 | |

=== 100 metres hurdles ===
17 April

| Rank | Name | Nationality | Time | Notes |
|---|---|---|---|---|
| 1st place, gold medalist(s) | Edith Noeding | Peru | 13.9 | AR |
| 2nd place, silver medalist(s) | Elisabeth Nunes | Brazil | 14.4 | |
| 3rd place, bronze medalist(s) | Maria Luisa Betioli | Brazil | 15.0 | |
| 4 | Gloria Barturen | Chile | 15.3 | |
| 5 | Alicia Cantarini | Argentina | 15.8 | |
| 6 | Jenny Menen | Chile | 16.0 | |
| 7 | Lelia Scipioni | Argentina | 16.1 | |
| 8 | Simone Krauthausen | Peru | 16.6 | |

=== 4 × 100 metres relay ===
21 April

| Rank | Nation | Competitors | Time | Notes |
|---|---|---|---|---|
| 1st place, gold medalist(s) | Brazil | Conceição Geremias, Geralda de Souza, Elisabeth Nunes, Ivette Barbosa | 47.3 | |
| 2nd place, silver medalist(s) | Peru | Carmela Bolivár, Edith Noeding, Simone Krauthausen, Magaly Zumaeta | 47.5 | |
| 3rd place, bronze medalist(s) | Venezuela | Elsa Antúnez, Trinidad Castillo, Alix Castillo, Doris Rivas | 47.8 | |
| 4 | Chile | Aurora Sáenz, Pérez, Leslie Cooper, Victoria Roa | 48.0 | |
| 5 | Uruguay | | 48.5 | |
| 6 | Argentina | Alicia Cantarini, Graciela Ghelfi, Angela Godoy, Belkis Fava | 1:02.9 | |

=== 4 × 400 metres relay ===
21 April

| Rank | Nation | Competitors | Time | Notes |
|---|---|---|---|---|
| 1st place, gold medalist(s) | Brazil | Valdéa Chagas, Ivette Barbosa, Conceição Geremias, Rosângela Verissimo | 3:47.4 | AR |
| 2nd place, silver medalist(s) | Chile | Victoria Roa, Oriana Salas, Aurora Sáenz, Carmen Oyé | 3:54.0 | |
| 3rd place, bronze medalist(s) | Venezuela | Adriana Marchena, Julia González, Elsa Antúnez, Ana Rojas | 3:55.0 | |
| 4 | Uruguay | Carmen Etchegaray, Margarita Grun, Laura Oyhanctábal, Josefa Vicent | 3:56.2 | |
| 5 | Argentina | Angela Godoy, María Cristina Sinitsch, Ana María Nielsen, Graciela Ghelfi | 3:57.5 | |

=== High jump ===
17 April

| Rank | Name | Nationality | Result | Notes |
|---|---|---|---|---|
| 1st place, gold medalist(s) | Maria Luísa Betioli | Brazil | 1.75 | AR |
| 2nd place, silver medalist(s) | Edith Noeding | Peru | 1.65 | |
| 3rd place, bronze medalist(s) | Beatriz Bonfim | Brazil | 1.65 | |
| 4 | Beatriz Arancibia | Chile | 1.60 | |
| 5 | Ana Rojas | Venezuela | 1.60 | |
| 6 | Ursula Tilly | Chile | 1.55 | |
| 7 | Simone Krauthausen | Peru | 1.50 | |
| 8 | María Bico | Uruguay | 1.45 | |

=== Long jump ===
19 April

| Rank | Name | Nationality | Result | Notes |
|---|---|---|---|---|
| 1st place, gold medalist(s) | Elisabeth Nunes | Brazil | 6.06 | CR |
| 2nd place, silver medalist(s) | Conceição Geremias | Brazil | 6.03 | |
| 3rd place, bronze medalist(s) | Edith Noeding | Peru | 5.91 | |
| 4 | Ana María Desevici | Uruguay | 5.64 | |
| 5 | Silvia Kinzel | Chile | 5.61 | |
| 6 | Yolanda Durán | Chile | 5.55 | |
| 7 | María Bico | Uruguay | 5.49 | |
| 8 | Nilda García | Argentina | 5.33 | |

=== Shot put ===
19 April

| Rank | Name | Nationality | Result | Notes |
|---|---|---|---|---|
| 1st place, gold medalist(s) | Rosa Molina | Chile | 14.93 | CR |
| 2nd place, silver medalist(s) | Maria Boso | Brazil | 13.99 | |
| 3rd place, bronze medalist(s) | Miriam Yutronic | Chile | 13.23 | |
| 4 | Patricia Andrews | Venezuela | 13.16 | |
| 5 | Elisabeth Nunes | Brazil | 12.37 | |
| 6 | Irma Ortega | Argentina | 12.13 | |
| 7 | Patricia Weber | Argentina | 12.12 | |
| 8 | Miriam Finochietti | Uruguay | 11.81 | |

=== Discus throw ===
16 April

| Rank | Name | Nationality | Result | Notes |
|---|---|---|---|---|
| 1st place, gold medalist(s) | Miriam Yutronic | Chile | 49.36 | CR |
| 2nd place, silver medalist(s) | Odete Domingos | Brazil | 48.22 | |
| 3rd place, bronze medalist(s) | Irma Ortega | Argentina | 42.90 | |
| 4 | Ana María Mellado | Chile | 40.00 | |
| 5 | Maria Boso | Brazil | 39.56 | |
| 6 | Miriam Finochietti | Uruguay | 39.22 | |
| 7 | Patricia Andrews | Venezuela | 38.74 | |
| 8 | Clara Suárez | Argentina | 35.56 | |

=== Javelin throw ===
17 April

| Rank | Name | Nationality | Result | Notes |
|---|---|---|---|---|
| 1st place, gold medalist(s) | Gladys González | Venezuela | 49.86 | CR |
| 2nd place, silver medalist(s) | Ana María Campillay | Argentina | 43.18 | |
| 3rd place, bronze medalist(s) | Verónica Díaz | Chile | 42.46 | |
| 4 | Kiyomi Nakagawa | Brazil | 41.54 | |
| 5 | Bárbara dos Santos | Brazil | 39.94 | |
| 6 | María Elena Rojas | Chile | 37.72 | |
| 7 | Irma Ortega | Argentina | 33.22 | |

=== Pentathlon ===
20–21 April

The highest mark recorded in each event is highlighted in yellow

| Rank | Athlete | Nationality | 100m H | SP | HJ | LJ | 200m | Points | Notes |
|---|---|---|---|---|---|---|---|---|---|
| 1st place, gold medalist(s) | Edith Noeding | Peru | 14.0 | 11.36 | 1.66 | 5.78 | 24.7 | 4170 | |
| 2nd place, silver medalist(s) | Elisabeth Nunes | Brazil | 14.2 | 12.09 | 1.45 | 5.94 | 25.0 | 3975 | |
| 3rd place, bronze medalist(s) | Maria Luísa Betioli | Brazil | 15.1 | 9.13 | 1.69 | 5.26 | 25.4 | 3741 | |
| 4 | Beatriz Arancibia | Chile | 15.5 | 9.89 | 1.66 | 5.38 | 26.5 | 3661 | |
| 5 | Simone Krauthausen | Peru | 15.7 | 9.40 | 1.55 | 5.19 | 26.5 | 3449 | |
| 6 | Cecilia Goddard | Chile | 15.9 | 9.85 | 1.50 | 5.06 | 26.7 | 3358 | |
| 7 | Alicia Cantarini | Argentina | 16.0 | 8.67 | 1.40 | 4.50 | 27.5 | 2953 | |
