= Athletics at the 1971 Pan American Games – Men's 800 metres =

Men's 800 metres at the Pan American Games

The men's 800 metres event at the 1971 Pan American Games was held in Cali on 1, 2 and 3 August.

== Medalists ==
Gold	Silver	Bronze
Ken Swenson; United States	Art Sandison; United States	Byron Dyce; Jamaica

== Results ==
=== Heats ===
Rank	Heat	Name	Nationality	Time	Notes
1	1	Byron Dyce	Jamaica	1:50.54	Q
2	1	Art Sandison	United States	1:50.67	Q
3	1	Donaldo Arza	Panama	1:50.81	Q
4	1	Carlos Rodolfo Martínez	Mexico	1:50.92	Q
5	1	Fabio Zúñiga	Colombia	1:52.24	
6	3	Bill Smart	Canada	1:52.90	Q
7	2	Lennox Stewart	Trinidad and Tobago	1:53.02	Q
8	2	Gildardo López	Mexico	1:53.06	Q
9	3	Hugo Burgos	Colombia	1:53.07	Q
10	3	Daniel Gajate	Argentina	1:53.19	Q
11	3	Rómulo Carreño	Venezuela	1:53.38	Q
12	2	Leandro Civil	Cuba	1:53.46	Q
13	2	Ken Swenson	United States	1:53.48	Q
14	2	Carlos Heuchert	Argentina	1:53.52	
15	3	Roberto Salmona	Chile	1:53.61	
16	4	Darcy Pereira	Brazil	1:54.58	Q
17	2	Jorge Alemán	Peru	1:54.72	
18	4	Sergio Llanusa	Cuba	1:55.60	Q
19	4	Benedict Cayenne	Trinidad and Tobago	1:55.62	Q
20	4	Víctor Ríos	Chile	1:55.67	Q
21	4	Modesto Comprés	Dominican Republic	1:55.71	
22	2	Sixto Lora	Dominican Republic	1:56.63	
23	4	Joseph Anilus	Haiti	2:00.12	
24	4	José Siguas	Peru	2:03.73	
25	1	Maurice Charlotin	Haiti	2:10.72	

=== Semifinals ===
Rank	Heat	Name	Nationality	Time	Notes
1	2	Lennox Stewart	Trinidad and Tobago	1:52.05	Q
2	1	Byron Dyce	Jamaica	1:52.08	Q
3	2	Art Sandison	United States	1:52.11	Q
4	1	Ken Swenson	United States	1:52.24	Q
5	2	Carlos Rodolfo Martínez	Mexico	1:52.27	Q
6	1	Benedict Cayenne	Trinidad and Tobago	1:52.28	Q
7	1	Bill Smart	Canada	1:52.32	Q
8	2	Leandro Civil	Cuba	1:52.34	Q
9	1	Donaldo Arza	Panama	1:52.51	
10	2	Rómulo Carreño	Venezuela	1:52.80	
11	2	Hugo Burgos	Colombia	1:53.15	
12	2	Víctor Ríos	Chile	1:53.34	
13	1	Sergio Llanusa	Cuba	1:53.85	
14	1	Darcy Pereira	Brazil	1:54.33	
15	2	Daniel Gajate	Argentina	1:54.77	
16	1	Gildardo López	Mexico	1:57.25	

=== Final ===
Rank	Name	Nationality	Time	Notes
1st place, gold medalist(s)	Ken Swenson	United States	1:48.08	GR
2nd place, silver medalist(s)	Art Sandison	United States	1:48.42	
3rd place, bronze medalist(s)	Byron Dyce	Jamaica	1:48.42	
4	Lennox Stewart	Trinidad and Tobago	1:48.80	
5	Leandro Civil	Cuba	1:50.03	
6	Bill Smart	Canada	1:50.28	
7	Benedict Cayenne	Trinidad and Tobago	1:51.95	
8	Carlos Rodolfo Martínez	Mexico	1:52.07	
