= Athletics at the 1977 Bolivarian Games =

Athletics at the VIII Bolivarian Games
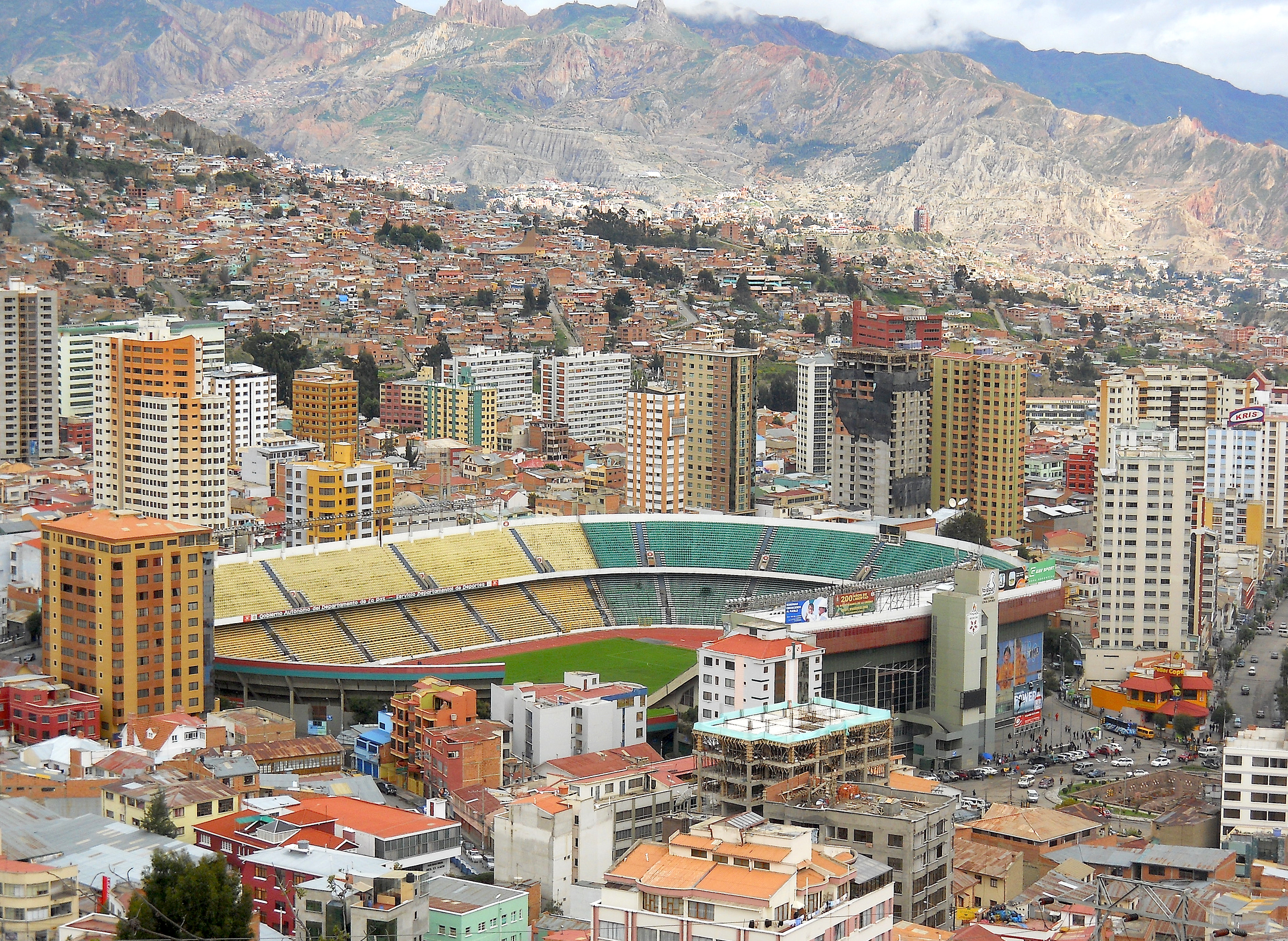
- Estadio Hernando Siles, La Paz, (2012)
- Dates: October 15–29, 1977
- Host city: La Paz, Bolivia
- Venue: Estadio Hernando Siles
- Level: Senior
- Events: 37 (23 men, 14 women)

The Athletics competitions in the 1977 Bolivarian Games were held at Estadio Hernando Siles in La Paz, Bolivia, on October 15–29, 1977.

A detailed history of the early Bolivarian Games, 1938 to 1989, was written (in Spanish) by José Gamarra Zorrilla, former President of the Bolivian Olympic Committee, and first President (1976-1982) of ODESUR. Gold medal winners from Ecuador were published by the Comité Olímpico Ecuatoriano.

In 1977, total of 37 events were contested: 23 by men and 14 by women.

== Medal summary ==
All results are marked as "affected by altitude" (A), because the stadium in La Paz is located at 3,637 metres (11,932 ft) above sea level.

Starting January 1, 1977, the International Association of Athletics Federations required fully automatic timing to the hundredth of a second for events up to 400 metres. Some results in the middle and long distance events that did not have fully automatic timing are marked (a).

=== Men ===
Event	Gold		Silver		Bronze	
100 metres	Miguel Sulbarán (VEN)	10.42 A	Fernando Acevedo (PER)	10.43 A	José Chacín (VEN)	10.62 A
200 metres	Fernando Acevedo (PER)	20.82 A	Víctor Escobar (VEN)	21.30 A	José Chacín (VEN)	21.50 A
400 metres	Fernando Acevedo (PER)	45.43 A	Hipólito Brown (VEN)	46.97 A	Alexis Herrera (VEN)	47.36 A
800 metres	Hugo Villegas (COL)	1:56.5 a A	Luis Velázquez (VEN)	1:56.9 a A	Pedro Foronda (BOL)	1:56.9 a A
1500 metres	Jairo Cubillos (COL)	3:58.3 a A	Hugo Villegas (COL)	4:04.6 a A	Baltazar Cuartos (COL)	4:06.1 a A
5000 metres	Jairo Correa (COL)	15:21.4 a A	Jairo Cubillos (COL)	15:42.5 a A	Luis Tipán (ECU)	15:50.2 a A
10,000 metres	Luis Tipán (ECU)	32:24.77 A	Alfonso Torres (COL)	32:42.4 a A	Luis Camacho (ECU)	32:48.7 a A
Half Marathon	Luis Tipán (ECU)	1:12:02 A	Alfonso Torres (COL)	1:14:00 A	Luis Camacho (ECU)	1:15:16 A
110 metres hurdles	Jesús Villegas (COL)	14.43 A	Oscar Marín (VEN)	14.56 A	Roberto Gonzáles (PER)	14.76 A
400 metres hurdles	Fabio Zúñiga (COL)	51.94 A	Moisés Zambrano (VEN)	53.58 A	Jorge Gómez (VEN)	54.22 A
3000 metres steeplechase	Jairo Correa (COL)	9:39.99 A	Lucirio Garrido (VEN)	10:11.0 a A	Francisco Linares (PER)	10:16.5 a A
4 x 100 metres relay	Venezuela; Ely Zabala; Miguel Sulbarán; José Chacín; Víctor Escobar	40.28 A	Peru; José Luis Pérez; Fernando Acevedo; Roberto Gonzáles; José Luis Elías	41.17 A	Colombia; Julio Acosta; Gabriel Loperas; Fabio Zúñiga; Onias Palacios	41.84 A
4 x 400 metres relay	Venezuela; Miguel Padrón; Alexis Herrera; José Moisés Zambrano; Hipólito Brown	3:12.85 A	Colombia; Gabriel Loperas; Julio Acosta; Hugo Villegas; Fabio Zúñiga	3:13.3 a A	Peru; Roberto Gonzáles; José Luis Elías; José Luis Pérez; Fernando Acevedo	3:16.8 a A
20 Kilometres Road Walk	Ernesto Alfaro (COL)	1:56:20 A	Eduardo Quelale (BOL)	1:58:46 A	Jorge Lazcano (ECU)	1:59:35 A
High jump	Roberto Abugattás (PER)	2.10 A	Luis Arbulú (PER)	2.05 A	Carlos Guillén (BOL)	1.99 A
Pole vault	Astulfo Izquel (VEN)	4.10 A	Ciro Valdés (COL)	4.00 A	Carlos Faneit (VEN)	3.80 A
Long jump	Benigno Chourio (VEN)	7.25 A	Ronald Raborg (PER)	7.17 A	Densy Sprice (VEN)	7.12 A
Triple jump	José Salazar (VEN)	15.20 A	Densy Sprice (VEN)	14.81 A	Ronald Raborg (PER)	14.64 A
Shot put	José Carreño (VEN)	15.95 A	Jesús Ramos (VEN)	15.87 A	Modesto Barreto (COL)	15.27 A
Discus throw	Modesto Barreto (COL)	47.04 A	Julio Alexander (VEN)	44.12 A	José Carreño (VEN)	44.06 A
Hammer throw	Edgar Yarce (COL)	53.14 A	Pedro Quintana (VEN)	52.62 A	Marcos Borregales (VEN)	51.52 A
Javelin throw	Mario Sotomayor (COL)	71.88 A	Miro Ronac (PER)	59.24 A	Oswaldo Torres (VEN)	56.76 A
Decathlon	Ramón Montezuma (VEN)	6899 A	Juan Ríos (VEN)	6252 A	Oswaldo Ríos (VEN)	6019 A

=== Women ===
Event	Gold		Silver		Bronze	
100 metres	Carmela Bolívar (PER)	12.07 A	Edith Noeding (PER)	12.14 A	Martha Meléndez (COL)	12.23 A
200 metres	Eucaris Caicedo (COL)	24.10 A	Elsa Antúnez (VEN)	24.64 A	Carmela Bolívar (PER)	24.64 A
400 metres	Eucaris Caicedo (COL)	54.76 A	Adriana Marchena (VEN)	55.90 A	Janeth Carvajal (VEN)	58.72 A
800 metres	Adriana Marchena (VEN)	2:21.3 a A	Nubia Medina (COL)	2:22.1 a A	Laura Méndez (ECU)	2:22.4 a A
1500 metres	Teresa Rodríguez (COL)	5:02.88 A	Mery Rojas (BOL)	5:03.0 a A	Sara Vincenti (BOL)	5:03.3 a A
100 metres hurdles	Edith Noeding (PER)	13.80 A	Nancy Vallecilla (ECU)	14.03 A	Evelyn Abreu (VEN)	14.99 A
4 x 100 metres relay	Peru; Rosa María Puig; Carmela Bolívar; O. Bustamente; Edith Noeding	47.62 A	Bolivia; Blanca Ibáñez; A. Novillo; Martha Novillo; Isabel Aleman	48.20 A		
4 x 400 metres relay	Venezuela; Arelis Pulvet; Yaneth Carvajal; Lourdes Nicola; Adriana Marchena	3:56.06 A	Colombia; Martha Meléndez; Teresa Rodríguez; Nubia Medina; Eucaris Caicedo	4:01.1 a A	Ecuador; Cecilia Trujillo; María Tapia; Julia Vera; Nancy Vallecilla	4:03.9 a A
High jump	Evelyn Jabiles (PER)	1.73 A	Ana Rojas (VEN)	1.71 A	Linda Spenst (BOL)	1.71 A
Long jump	Nancy Vallecilla (ECU)	6.06 A	Edith Noeding (PER)	5.99 A	Sorelis Bohórquez (VEN)	5.75 A
Shot put	Patricia Andrus (VEN)	13.17 A	Luz María Quiñonez (ECU)	12.54 A	Patricia Guerrero (PER)	12.21 A
Discus throw	Luz María Quiñonez (ECU)	40.46 A	Patricia Andrus (VEN)	40.30 A	Betty Jones (VEN)	33.28 A
Javelin throw	Mariela Zapata (COL)	49.34 A	Patricia Guerrero (PER)	45.52 A	Elizabeth Hernández (VEN)	41.24 A
Pentathlon	Nancy Vallecilla (ECU)	3753 A	Alix Castillo (VEN)	3521 A	Linda Spenst (BOL)	3355 A

== Medal table (unofficial) ==
* Host nation (Bolivia)

Rank	Nation	Gold	Silver	Bronze	Total
1	Colombia (COL)	14	8	4	26
2	Venezuela (VEN)	11	16	15	42
3	Peru (PER)	7	8	6	21
4	Ecuador (ECU)	5	2	6	13
5	Bolivia (BOL)*	0	3	5	8
Totals (5 entries)		37	37	36	110
