= Edith Noeding =

Peruvian hurdler (born 1954)

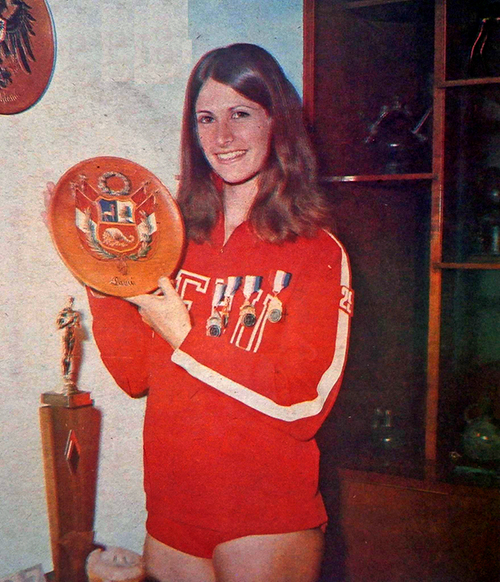
- Noeding in the 1970s

Personal information
- Full name: Edith Renate Anita Noeding Koltermann
- Nickname: La Gacela de Oro
- Born: November 3, 1954 (age 71) Lobitos District, Peru
- Height: 1.70 m (5 ft 7 in)
- Weight: 58 kg (128 lb)

Sport
- Country: Peru
- Sport: Women's Athletics
Medal record
Pan American Games
Gold medal – first place	1975 Mexico City	100 m hurdles
Bolivarian Games
Gold medal – first place	1973 Panama City	100 m hurdles
Gold medal – first place	1973 Panama City	Long jump
Gold medal – first place	1973 Panama City	Pentathlon
Gold medal – first place	1977 La Paz	100 m hurdles
Silver medal – second place	1970 Maracaibo	100 m hurdles
Silver medal – second place	1970 Maracaibo	Pentathlon
Silver medal – second place	1977 La Paz	100 m
Silver medal – second place	1977 La Paz	Long jump
Bronze medal – third place	1970 Maracaibo	Long jump

Edith Noeding (born November 3, 1954, in Lobitos District) is a retired female track and field athlete from Peru, who competed in the hurdles event during her career. She won the gold medal at the 1975 Pan American Games in the women's 100 metres hurdles event. There Noeding set her personal best in the women's 100 metres hurdles event on October 19, 1975, clocking 13.56 in Mexico City. She represented Peru at the 1972 Summer Olympics and 1976 Summer Olympics.

== International competitions ==
Year	Competition	Venue	Position	Event	Notes
Representing Peru
1969	South American Championships	Quito, Ecuador	7th (h)	80 m hurdles	12.2
1969	South American Championships	Quito, Ecuador	4th	4 × 100 m relay	48.6
1970	Bolivarian Games	Maracaibo, Venezuela	2nd	100 m hurdles	15.1
1970	Bolivarian Games	Maracaibo, Venezuela	3rd	Long jump	5.48 m
1970	Bolivarian Games	Maracaibo, Venezuela	2nd	Pentathlon	3834 pts
1970	South American Junior Championships	Cali, Colombia	2nd	100 m	12.5
1970	South American Junior Championships	Cali, Colombia	1st	100 m hurdles	14.7
1970	South American Junior Championships	Cali, Colombia	6th	4 × 100 m relay	?
1970	South American Junior Championships	Cali, Colombia	2nd	Long jump	5.55 m
1971	Pan American Games	Cali, Colombia	13th (sf)	100 m	12.40
1971	Pan American Games	Cali, Colombia	5th	100 m hurdles	14.70
1971	Pan American Games	Cali, Colombia	6th	4 × 100 m relay	47.32
1971	Pan American Games	Cali, Colombia	11th	Long jump	5.31 m
1971	South American Championships	Lima, Peru	4th	100 m hurdles	14.9
1971	South American Championships	Lima, Peru	2nd	4 × 100 m relay	47.6
1971	South American Championships	Lima, Peru	3rd	Long jump	5.58 m
1971	South American Championships	Lima, Peru	2nd	Pentathlon	3635 pts
1972	Olympic Games	Munich, West Germany	24th	Pentathlon	3870 pts
1972	South American Junior Championships	Asunción, Paraguay	1st	100 m hurdles	15.0
1972	South American Junior Championships	Asunción, Paraguay	1st	4 × 100 m relay	49.4
1972	South American Junior Championships	Asunción, Paraguay	2nd	Long jump	5.63 m
1972	South American Junior Championships	Asunción, Paraguay	7th	Shot put	10.17 m
1972	South American Junior Championships	Asunción, Paraguay	1st	Pentathlon	3432 pts
1973	Bolivarian Games	Panama City, Panama	1st	100 m hurdles	14.20
1973	Bolivarian Games	Panama City, Panama	1st	Long jump	6.00 m w
1973	Bolivarian Games	Panama City, Panama	1st	Pentathlon	3991 pts
1974	South American Championships	Santiago, Chile	10th (h)	100 m	12.9
1974	South American Championships	Santiago, Chile	1st	100 m hurdles	13.9
1974	South American Championships	Santiago, Chile	2nd	4 × 100 m relay	47.5
1974	South American Championships	Santiago, Chile	2nd	High jump	1.65 m
1974	South American Championships	Santiago, Chile	3rd	Long jump	5.91 m
1974	South American Championships	Santiago, Chile	1st	Pentathlon	4170 pts
1975	Pan American Games	Mexico City, Mexico	1st	100 m hurdles	13.56
1975	Pan American Games	Mexico City, Mexico	4th	Pentathlon	4257 pts
1976	Olympic Games	Montreal, Canada	21st (h)	100 m hurdles	14.14
1976	Olympic Games	Montreal, Canada	–	Pentathlon	DNF
1977	Bolivarian Games	La Paz, Bolivia	2nd	100 m	12.14 A
1977	Bolivarian Games	La Paz, Bolivia	1st	100 m hurdles	13.80 A
1977	Bolivarian Games	La Paz, Bolivia	2nd	Long jump	5.99 m A
1977	South American Championships	Montevideo, Uruguay	1st	100 m hurdles	14.47

== Personal bests ==
Outdoor

- 100 metres hurdles – 13.56 (Mexico City 1975)
- Pentathlon – 4262 (1975)

Indoor

- 60 metres hurdles – 8.53 (Dortmund 1976)
