= Conceição Geremias =

Brazilian athlete (born 1956)

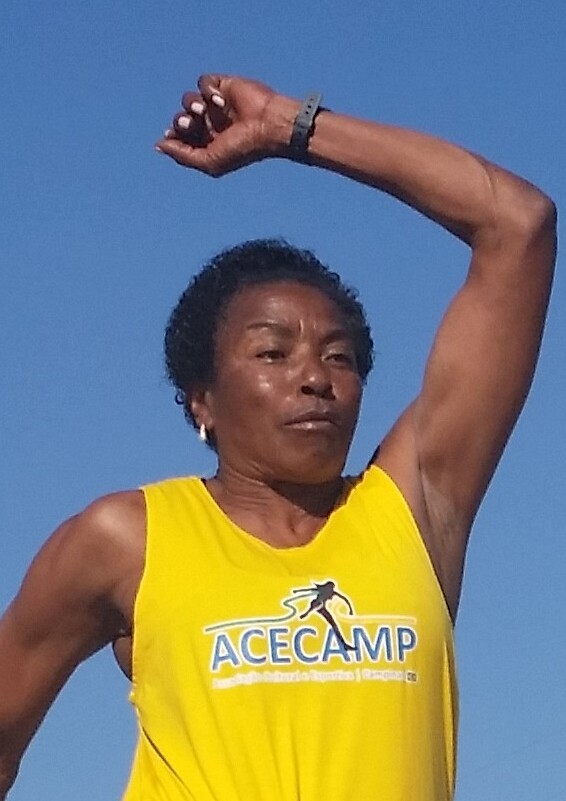
- Geremias in 2014

Personal information
- Full name: Conceição Aparecida Geremias
- Born: 23 July 1956 (age 70) Campinas, São Paulo, Brazil
- Height: 172 cm (5 ft 8 in)
- Weight: 64 kg (141 lb)
Medal record
Women's athletics
Representing Brazil
Pan American Games
Gold medal – first place	1983 Caracas	Heptathlon

Conceição Aparecida Geremias (born 23 July 1956 in Campinas, São Paulo) is a retired female pentathlete, heptathlete and long jumper from Brazil.

== Biography ==
She won the gold medal at the 1983 Pan American Games in Caracas. She is a three-time Olympian.

== International competitions ==
Year	Competition	Venue	Position	Event	Notes
Representing Brazil
1971	South American Championships	Lima, Peru	9th (h)	200 m	25.9
1974	South American Championships	Santiago, Chile	1st	100 m	12.1
1974	South American Championships	Santiago, Chile	3rd	200 m	24.7
1974	South American Championships	Santiago, Chile	1st	4 × 100 m relay	47.3
1974	South American Championships	Santiago, Chile	1st	4 × 400 m relay	3:47.4
1974	South American Championships	Santiago, Chile	2nd	Long jump	6.03 m
1974	South American Junior Championships	Lima, Peru	3rd	100 m	12.0
1974	South American Junior Championships	Lima, Peru	4th	200 m	25.1
1974	South American Junior Championships	Lima, Peru	1st	100 m hurdles	14.4
1974	South American Junior Championships	Lima, Peru	3rd	4 × 100 m relay	47.9
1974	South American Junior Championships	Lima, Peru	1st	4 × 400 m relay	3:54.1
1974	South American Junior Championships	Lima, Peru	4th	High jump	1.60 m
1974	South American Junior Championships	Lima, Peru	2nd	Long jump	5.84 m
1974	South American Junior Championships	Lima, Peru	1st	Pentathlon	3964 pts
1975	South American Championships	Rio de Janeiro, Brazil	1st	Pentathlon	3904 pts
1975	Pan American Games	Mexico City, Mexico	5th	Pentathlon	4136 pts
1977	South American Championships	Montevideo, Uruguay	3rd	4 × 100 m relay	47.8
1977	South American Championships	Montevideo, Uruguay	3rd	Long jump	5.49 m
1977	South American Championships	Montevideo, Uruguay	1st	Pentathlon	3863 pts
1979	South American Championships	Bucaramanga, Colombia	2nd	Long jump	5.95 m
1979	South American Championships	Bucaramanga, Colombia	2nd	Pentathlon	3880 pts
1980	Olympic Games	Moscow, Soviet Union	14th	Pentathlon	4263 pts
1981	South American Championships	La Paz, Bolivia	1st	400 m hurdles	60.0 A
1981	South American Championships	La Paz, Bolivia	1st	4 × 100 m relay	45.3 A
1981	South American Championships	La Paz, Bolivia	1st	Long Jump	6.26 m A
1983	World Championships	Helsinki, Finland	—	Heptathlon	DNF
1983	Pan American Games	Caracas, Venezuela	9th	Long jump	5.93 m
1983	Pan American Games	Caracas, Venezuela	1st	Heptathlon	6084 pts
1983	Ibero-American Championships	Barcelona, Spain	4th	100 m hurdles	14.69
1983	Ibero-American Championships	Barcelona, Spain	1st	400 m hurdles	58.74
1983	South American Championships	Santa Fe, Argentina	1st	400 m hurdles	59.5
1983	South American Championships	Santa Fe, Argentina	2nd	High jump	1.77 m
1983	South American Championships	Santa Fe, Argentina	1st	Heptathlon	5865 pts
1984	Olympic Games	Los Angeles, United States	18th	Long jump	6.04 m
1984	Olympic Games	Los Angeles, United States	—	Heptathlon	DNF
1985	South American Championships	Santiago, Chile	1st	100 m hurdles	14.15 s
1985	South American Championships	Santiago, Chile	1st	High jump	1.73 m
1985	South American Championships	Santiago, Chile	1st	Long jump	6.04 m
1987	South American Championships	São Paulo, Brazil	1st	Heptathlon	5550 pts
1988	Ibero-American Championships	Mexico City, Mexico	7th	100 m hurdles	13.96 A
1988	Ibero-American Championships	Mexico City, Mexico	5th	Long jump	6.14 m A
1988	Ibero-American Championships	Mexico City, Mexico	3rd	4 × 100 m relay	45.28 A
1988	Olympic Games	Seoul, South Korea	22nd	Heptathlon	5508 pts
1989	South American Championships	Medellín, Colombia	5th	100 m hurdles	14.3 s A
1989	South American Championships	Medellín, Colombia	1st	Heptathlon	5574 pts A
1991	South American Championships	Manaus, Brazil	2nd	Heptathlon	5277 pts
1993	South American Championships	Lima, Peru	3rd	Triple jump	12.71 m
1993	South American Championships	Lima, Peru	2nd	Heptathlon	5105 pts
1995	South American Championships	Manaus, Brazil	2nd	Pole vault	2.70 m
1995	South American Championships	Manaus, Brazil	5th	Heptathlon	4247 pts
