= Lucirio Garrido =

Venezuelan athlete (born 1947)

Personal information
- Born: 2 March 1947 (age 78) Calabozo, Venezuela

Sport
- Sport: Athletics
- Event(s): 3000 m steeple, 5000 m
- Coached by: Héctor Pirela

Lucirio Garrido (born 2 March 1947) is a Venezuelan former track and field athlete who competed in the 3000 metres steeplechase and the 5000 metres. He is the first of a dynasty of Venezuelan international athletes, including his son, Lucirio Garrido Jr. and his grandson Lucirio Antonio Garrido.

Competing from 1970 to the early 1980s, he was a three-time medallist at both the South American Championships in Athletics and the Central American and Caribbean Games, and a six-time medallist at the Central American and Caribbean Championships in Athletics. He won medals at three editions of the Bolivarian Games, finishing with a steeplechase gold at the 1981 Games.

== International competitions ==
Year	Competition	Venue	Position	Event	Notes
1970	Bolivarian Games	Maracaibo, Venezuela	3rd	5000 m	14:51.0
1970	Bolivarian Games	Maracaibo, Venezuela	3rd	3000 m s'chase	9:23.1
1971	Central American and Caribbean Championships	Kingston, Jamaica	3rd	5000 m	14:30.0
1971	Central American and Caribbean Championships	Kingston, Jamaica	1st	3000 m s'chase	8:58.6 CR
1971	Pan American Games	Cali, Colombia	13th	5000 m	15:27.5
1973	Central American and Caribbean Championships	Maracaibo, Venezuela	5th	3000 m s'chase	9:08.7
1974	Central American and Caribbean Games	Santo Domingo, Dominican Republic	4th	5000 m	14:06.6
1974	Central American and Caribbean Games	Santo Domingo, Dominican Republic	3rd	3000 m s'chase	8:54.8
1974	South American Championships	Santiago, Chile	4th	5000 m	14:25.2
1974	South American Championships	Santiago, Chile	4th	10,000 m	30:31.2
1974	South American Championships	Santiago, Chile	3rd	3000 m s'chase	9:01.2
1975	Central American and Caribbean Championships	Ponce, Puerto Rico	2nd	5000 m	15:04.8
1977	Central American and Caribbean Championships	Xalapa, Mexico	3rd	3000 m s'chase	9:03.1
1977	South American Championships	Montevideo, Uruguay	5th	5000 m	14:35.0
1977	South American Championships	Montevideo, Uruguay	2nd	3000 m s'chase	9:01.5
1977	Bolivarian Games	La Paz, Bolivia	2nd	3000 m s'chase	10:11.0
1978	Central American and Caribbean Games	Medellín, Colombia	6th	5000 m	14:41.52
1978	Central American and Caribbean Games	Medellín, Colombia	7th	3000 m s'chase	9:16.36
1979	Central American and Caribbean Championships	Guadalajara, Mexico	3rd	5000 m	14:50.4
1979	Central American and Caribbean Championships	Guadalajara, Mexico	2nd	3000 m s'chase	9:18.7
1979	South American Championships	Bucaramanga, Colombia	5th	10,000 m	29:58.5
1979	South American Championships	Bucaramanga, Colombia	3rd	Road race	1:59:30
1981	Bolivarian Games	Barquisimeto, Venezuela	1st	3000 m s'chase	9:01.81
1982	Central American and Caribbean Games	Havana, Cuba	3rd	5000 m	14:24.94
1982	Central American and Caribbean Games	Havana, Cuba	2nd	3000 m s'chase	8:52.50
