= Athletics at the 1971 Pan American Games – Men's high jump =

Men's high jump at the Pan American Games

The men's high jump event at the 1971 Pan American Games was held in Cali on 31 July.

== Results ==
Rank	Name	Nationality	Result	Notes
1st place, gold medalist(s)	Pat Matzdorf	United States	2.10	
2nd place, silver medalist(s)	Wilf Wedmann	Canada	2.10	
3rd place, bronze medalist(s)	Luis Arbulú	Peru	2.05	
4	John Hawkins	Canada	2.05	
5	Hermes Cabal	Colombia	2.00	
6	Luis Barrionuevo	Argentina	1.95	
7	Pedro Yeque	Venezuela	1.95	
8	José Dalmastro	Argentina	1.90	
