= Adriana Marchena =

Venezuelan middle-distance runner

Personal information
- Full name: Adriana Josefina Marchena Espinoza
- Nickname: La Correcaminos
- Born: 2 May 1956 (age 70) La Vega Parish, Venezuela

Sport
- Sport: Athletics
- Event(s): 400 m, 800 m, 1500 m

Adriana Josefina Marchena Espinoza (born 2 May 1956) is a retired Venezuelan middle-distance runner. She won multiple medals at regional level.

== International competitions ==
Year	Competition	Venue	Position	Event	Notes
Representing Venezuela
1970	South American Junior Championships	Cali, Colombia	3rd	4 × 100 m relay	48.8
1971	Central American and Caribbean Championships	Kingston, Jamaica	3rd	4 × 100 m relay	47.2
1971	Pan American Games	Cali, Colombia	19th (h)	100 m	12.62
1971	Pan American Games	Cali, Colombia	–	4 × 100 m relay	DNF
1973	Bolivarian Games	Panama City, Panama	3rd	4 × 100 m relay	48.2
1974	South American Championships	Santiago, Chile	2nd	400 m	57.0
1974	South American Championships	Santiago, Chile	4th	800 m	2:16.1
1974	South American Championships	Santiago, Chile	3rd	4 × 400 m relay	3:55.0
1974	South American Junior Championships	Lima, Peru	2nd	400 m	56.3
1974	South American Junior Championships	Lima, Peru	2nd	800 m	2:13.3
1974	South American Junior Championships	Lima, Peru	4th	4 × 100 m relay	47.9
1974	South American Junior Championships	Lima, Peru	6th	4 × 400 m relay	4:10.2
1974	Central American and Caribbean; Junior Championships (U20)	Maracaibo, Venezuela	3rd	200 m	25.08
1974	Central American and Caribbean; Junior Championships (U20)	Maracaibo, Venezuela	4th	400 m	56.38
1974	Central American and Caribbean; Junior Championships (U20)	Maracaibo, Venezuela	1st	800 m	2:14.01
1974	Central American and Caribbean; Junior Championships (U20)	Maracaibo, Venezuela	3rd	4 × 100 m relay	49.03
1977	Bolivarian Games	La Paz, Bolivia	2nd	400 m	55.90
1977	Bolivarian Games	La Paz, Bolivia	1st	800 m	2:21.3
1977	Bolivarian Games	La Paz, Bolivia	1st	4 × 400 m relay	3:56.06
1977	South American Championships	Montevideo, Uruguay	2nd	400 m	56.48
1977	South American Championships	Montevideo, Uruguay	2nd	800 m	2:15.8
1977	South American Championships	Montevideo, Uruguay	5th	4 × 100 m relay	48.5
1977	South American Championships	Montevideo, Uruguay	3rd	4 × 400 m relay	3:55.2
1979	Central American and Caribbean Championships	Havana, Cuba	3rd	4 × 400 m relay	3:45.9
1979	South American Championships	Bucaramanga, Colombia	4th	400 m	55.5
1979	South American Championships	Bucaramanga, Colombia	3rd	800 m	2:10.4
1979	South American Championships	Bucaramanga, Colombia	3rd	4 × 100 m relay	46.6
1979	South American Championships	Bucaramanga, Colombia	5th	4 × 400 m relay	3:56.3
1982	Central American and Caribbean Games	Havana, Cuba	6th	800 m	2:12.33
1982	Central American and Caribbean Games	Havana, Cuba	6th	4 × 400 m relay	3:46.11
1983	Central American and Caribbean Championships	Havana, Cuba	3rd	800 m	2:09.20
1983	Central American and Caribbean Championships	Havana, Cuba	3rd	1500 m	4:26.57
1983	Pan American Games	Caracas, Venezuela	10th (h)	800 m	2:08.58
1983	Pan American Games	Caracas, Venezuela	7th	1500 m	4:27.50
1983	South American Championships	Santa Fe, Argentina	4th	800 m	2:08.3
1983	South American Championships	Santa Fe, Argentina	3rd	1500 m	4:27.5

== Personal bests ==
Outdoor

- 800 metres – 2:09.11 (Lausanne 1983)
