= Athletics at the 1975 Pan American Games – Women's 100 metres hurdles =

Women's 100 metres hurdles at the Pan American Games

The women's 100 metres hurdles event at the 1975 Pan American Games was held in Mexico City on 18 and 19 October.

== Medalists ==
Gold	Silver	Bronze
Edith Noeding; Peru	Debbie LaPlante; United States	Marlene Elejalde; Cuba

== Results ==
=== Heats ===
Wind:
Heat 1: 0.0 m/s, Heat 2: 0.0 m/s, Heat 3: 0.0 m/s

Rank	Heat	Name	Nationality	Time	Notes
1	2	Edith Noeding	Peru	13.59	Q
2	1	Debbie LaPlante	United States	13.73	Q
3	1	Sue Bradley	Canada	13.76	Q
4	3	Marlene Elejalde	Cuba	13.91	Q
5	3	Pat Donnelly	United States	14.07	Q
6	1	Maria Luísa Betioli	Brazil	14.29	q
7	2	Carmen Smith	Jamaica	14.32	Q
8	2	Ann Adams	Trinidad and Tobago	14.88	q
9	1	June Smith	Trinidad and Tobago	14.99	
10	2	María Ángeles Cato	Mexico	15.09	
11	3	Linda Woodside	Bahamas	15.17	
	2	Liz Damman	Canada	DQ	

=== Final ===
Wind: -0.3 m/s

Rank	Name	Nationality	Time	Notes
1st place, gold medalist(s)	Edith Noeding	Peru	13.56	NR
2nd place, silver medalist(s)	Debbie LaPlante	United States	13.68	
3rd place, bronze medalist(s)	Marlene Elejalde	Cuba	13.80	
4	Pat Donnelly	United States	13.90	
5	Carmen Smith	Jamaica	14.08	
6	Sue Bradley	Canada	14.34	
7	Maria Luísa Betioli	Brazil	14.35	
8	Ann Adams	Trinidad and Tobago	14.69	
