= Luis Arbulú =

Peruvian high jumper

Personal information
- Full name: Luis Nemecio Arbulú Alcas
- Born: 22 May 1949
- Died: 20 November 2021 (aged 72)

Sport
- Sport: Athletics
- Event: High jump

Luis Nemecio Arbulú Alcas (22 May 1949 – 20 November 2021) was a Peruvian high jumper. He won the bronze medal at the 1971 Pan American Games in addition to several medals at continental level.

== International competitions ==
Year	Competition	Venue	Position	Notes
Representing Peru
1968	South American Junior Championships	Lima, Peru	2nd	2.00 m
1969	South American Championships	Quito, Ecuador	1st	2.00 m
1970	Bolivarian Games	Maracaibo, Venezuela	3rd	2.00 m
1971	Pan American Games	Cali, Colombia	3rd	2.05 m
1971	South American Championships	Lima, Peru	5th	1.95 m
1973	Bolivarian Games	Panama City, Panama	2nd	2.04 m
1974	South American Championships	Santiago, Chile	1st	2.06 m
1977	Bolivarian Games	La Paz, Bolivia	2nd	2.05 m
1977	South American Championships	Montevideo, Uruguay	2nd	2.00 m
1978	Southern Cross Games	La Paz, Bolivia	2nd	2.05 m
