= Jairo Correa =

Colombian mountain runner

Personal information
- Nationality: Colombian
- Born: 27 October 1954 (age 71)

Sport
- Country: Colombia
- Sport: Athletics; Mountain running
Medal record
Athletics
Central American and Caribbean Games
Silver medal – second place	1974 Santo Domingo	5000 m
South American Championships in Athletics
Gold medal – first place	1974 Santiago	10,000 m
Gold medal – first place	1977 Montevideo	3000 m st
Silver medal – second place	1974 Santiago	5000 m
Silver medal – second place	1983 Santa Fe	Marathon
Bronze medal – third place	1977 Montevideo	5000 m
Bronze medal – third place	1983 Santa Fe	10,000 m
Mountain running
Event	1st	2nd	3rd
World Championships Individual	2	0	0
World Championships Team	0	0	1
Total	2	0	1

Jairo Correa (born 2 October 1954) is a former Colombian mountain runner who won two World Mountain Running Championships (1989, 1991).

== Biography ==
He won three times the Swiss race Sierre-Zinal (1990, 1993, 1995).

== International competitions ==
Year	Competition	Venue	Position	Event	Notes
Representing Colombia
1972	South American Junior Championships	Asunción, Paraguay	2nd	1500 m	4:05.1
1972	South American Junior Championships	Asunción, Paraguay	1st	3000 m	8:58.6
1973	Central American and Caribbean Championships	Maracaibo, Venezuela	4th	5000 m	14:23.8
1973	Central American and Caribbean Championships	Maracaibo, Venezuela	4th	10,000 m	30:26.6
1974	Central American and Caribbean Games	Santo Domingo, Dominican Republic	2nd	5000 m	14:03.0
1974	Central American and Caribbean Games	Santo Domingo, Dominican Republic	4th	10,000 m	30:43.2
1974	South American Championships	Santiago, Chile	2nd	5000 m	14:22.4
1974	South American Championships	Santiago, Chile	1st	10,000 m	29:27.3
1977	Bolivarian Games	La Paz, Bolivia	1st	5000 m	15:21.4
1977	Bolivarian Games	La Paz, Bolivia	1st	3000 m s'chase	9:39.99
1977	South American Championships	Montevideo, Uruguay	3rd	5000 m	14:26.0
1977	South American Championships	Montevideo, Uruguay	1st	3000 m s'chase	9:00.5
1983	South American Championships	Santa Fe, Argentina	8th	5000 m	14:41.3
1983	South American Championships	Santa Fe, Argentina	3rd	10,000 m	29:22.7
1983	South American Championships	Santa Fe, Argentina	2nd	Marathon	2:17:43
