= Athletics at the 1973 Bolivarian Games =

Athletics at the VII Bolivarian Games
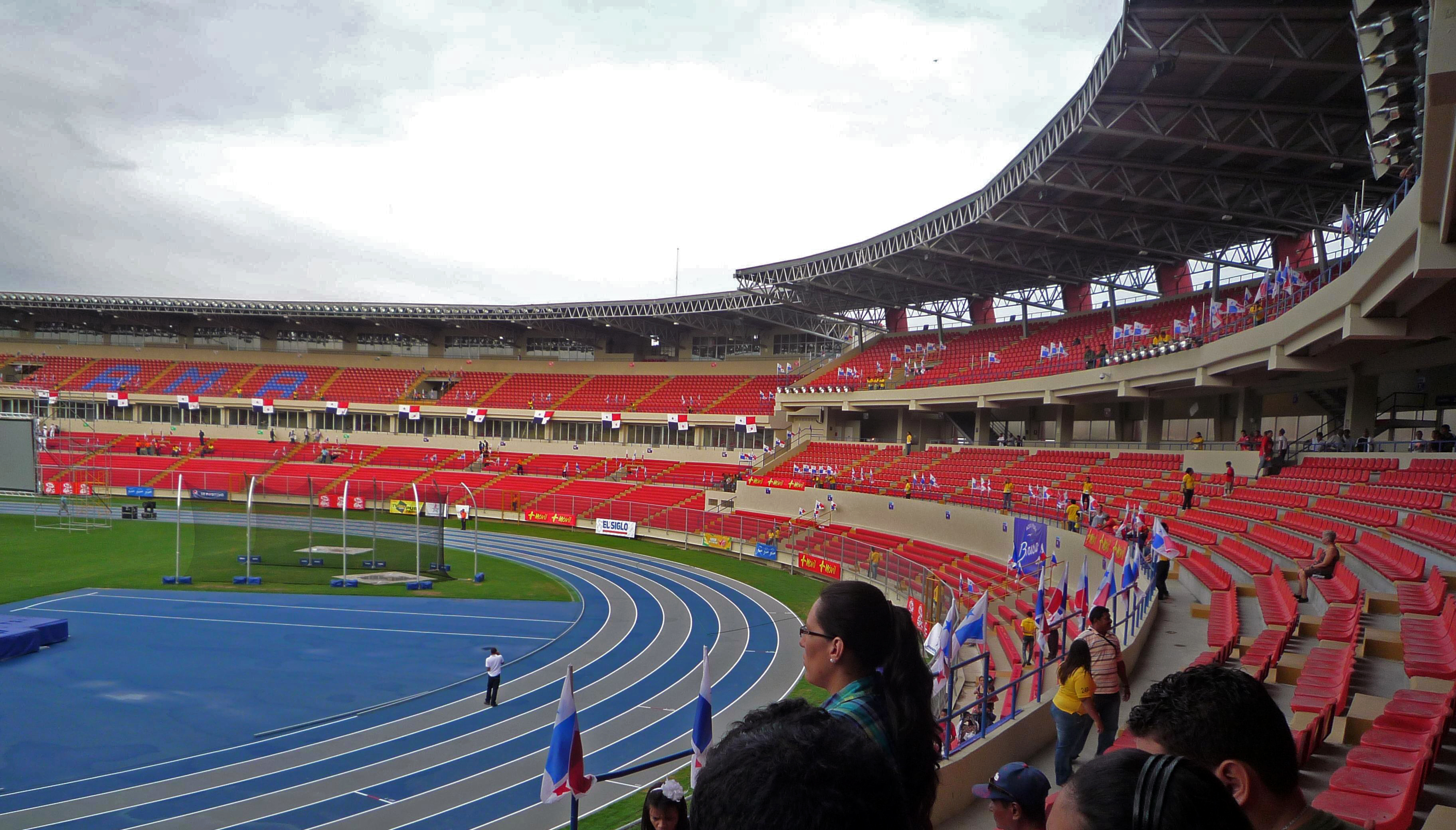
- Estadio Rommel Fernández (formerly Estadio Revolución), Panama City (2010)
- Dates: February 17 - March 3
- Host city: Panama City, Panama
- Venue: Estadio Revolución
- Level: Senior
- Events: 34 (22 men, 12 women)

Athletics competitions at the 1973 Bolivarian Games were held at the Estadio Revolución in Panama City, Panama, between February 17 - March 3, 1973.

A detailed history of the early editions of the Bolivarian Games between 1938 and 1989 was published in a book written (in Spanish) by José Gamarra Zorrilla, former president of the Bolivian Olympic Committee, and first president (1976-1982) of ODESUR. Gold medal winners from Ecuador were published by the Comité Olímpico Ecuatoriano.

A total of 34 events were contested, 22 by men and 12 by women.

== Medal summary ==
Medal winners were published.

=== Men ===
Event	Gold		Silver		Bronze	
100 metres (wind: +4.7 m/s)	Félix Mata (VEN)	10.15 w	Carl Edmund (PAN)	10.3 w	Miguel Sulbarán (VEN)	10.5 w
200 metres	Víctor Patíñez (VEN)	20.97	Félix Mata (VEN)	21.2	Carl Edmund (PAN)	21.4
400 metres	Fernando Acevedo (PER)	46.50	Víctor Patíñez (VEN)	46.63	Erick Phillips (VEN)	47.2
800 metres	Héctor López (VEN)	1:52.0	Wilfredo León (VEN)	1:53.6	Jorge Blackburn (PAN)	1:53.9
1500 metres	Jesús Barrero (COL)	3:59.7	Jorge Ramírez (COL)	4:04.6	Jesús Rendón (VEN)	4:05.6
5000 metres	Víctor Mora (COL)	14:20.0	Jorge Ramírez (COL)	14:52.2	Germán Correa (COL)	14:55.5
10,000 metres	Víctor Mora (COL)	29:26.18	Germán Correa (COL)	31:20.22	Gilberto Serna (COL)	31:34.32
Marathon	Gilberto Serna (COL)	2:35:12	Héctor Rodríguez (COL)	2:35:12	Martín Pavón (COL)	2:35:12
110 metres hurdles	Amos Milwood (PAN)	14.3 w	Alfredo Deza (PER)	14.5 w	Enrique Rendón (VEN)	14.6 w
400 metres hurdles	Fabio Zúñiga (COL)	51.10	Ricardo Worrel (PAN)	52.19	Amos Milwood (PAN)	52.79
3000 metres steeplechase	Víctor Mora (COL)	8:48.7	Rafael Baracaldo (COL)	9:15.5	Jorge Martínez (COL)	9:18.5
4 x 100 metres relay	Venezuela; Félix Mata; Humberto Galea; McKenzie; Jesús Rico	40.8	Peru; Magollon; Machinares; Fernando Acevedo; Roberto Gonzáles	41.6	Panama; Carl Edmund; Gilberto Ansell; Jacinto Tejeda; Rolando Mendieta	41.9
4 x 400 metres relay	Venezuela; Víctor Patíñez; Erick Phillips; Miguel Padrón; Pérez	3:09.3	Panama; Jorge Blackburn; Ricardo Worrell; Amos Milwood; Ardines	3:17.1	Peru; Silverio Pérez; Jorge Aleman; Machinares; García	3:18.0
High jump	Roberto Abugattás (PER)	2.04	Luis Arbulú (PER)	2.04	Hermes Cabal (COL)	2.01
Pole vault	Ciro Valdés (COL)	4.30	Héctor Thomas (VEN)	4.30	Luis Cárdenas (PER)	4.10
Long jump	Jaime Cárter (PAN)	7.37	Jaime Pautt (COL)	7.28	Benigno Chourio (VEN)	7.26
Triple jump	Edgar Moreno (VEN)	15.65	César Duff (PAN)	15.04	Jaime Pautt (COL)	15.04
Shot put	José Carreño (VEN)	15.74	Jesús Laya (VEN)	14.84	Jesús Ramos (VEN)	14.69
Discus throw	Julio Alexander (VEN)	47.90	Jorge Quintero (VEN)	44.40	Zenón Portillo (PAN)	43.36
Hammer throw	Marcos Borregales (VEN)	51.78	Pelayo Quintana (VEN)	48.20	Eugenio Consiglieri (PER)	48.00
Javelin throw	Howard Tauro Blake (PAN)	69.54	Eustacio de León (PAN)	66.86	Mario Sotomayor (COL)	65.84
Decathlon	Celso Aragón (COL)	6988	Ramón Montezuma (VEN)	6867	Wiliam López (VEN)	6192

=== Women ===
Event	Gold		Silver		Bronze	
100 metres	Diva Bishop (PAN)	11.7	Carmela Bolívar (PER)	11.8	Margarita Martínez (PAN)	12.4
200 metres (wind: 5.2 m/s)	Diva Bishop (PAN)	24.11 w	Carmela Bolívar (PER)	24.9 w	Mirna Ambursley (PAN)	25.2 w
400 metres	Rosalía Abadía (PAN)	55.9	Magaly Zumaeta (PER)	57.8	Ruby Callist (PAN)	58.8
800 metres	Rosalía Abadía (PAN)	2:13.82	Mirna Ambursley (PAN)	2:16.44	Julia González (VEN)	2:17.92
100 metres hurdles	Edith Noeding (PER)	14.20	Simone Krauthausen (PER)	14.9	Beatriz de Knight (PAN)	15.3
4 x 100 metres relay	Panama; Clotilde Morales; Rosalia Abadia; Margarita Martínez; Diva Bishop	47.3	Peru; María Luisa Vilca; Edith Noeding; Carmela Bolívar; Simone Krauthausen	47.5	Venezuela; Lucía Vaamonde; Adriana Marchena; Zulay Montano; Arilis Ávila	48.2
High jump	Amparo Bravo (COL)	1.58	Patricia Montero (PER)	1.58	Simone Krauthausen (PER)	1.58
Long jump	Edith Noeding (PER)	6.00 w	Lucía Vaamonde (VEN)	5.87	Carmen Álvarez (VEN)	5.59
Shot put	Dora Vásquez (VEN)	12.98	Patricia Andrus (VEN)	11.80	Soledad Jiménez (PER)	11.60
Discus throw	Isolina Vergara (COL)	45.80	Patricia Andrus (VEN)	38.60	María Barrera (PER)	38.58
Javelin throw	Gladys González (VEN)	43.40	Ana López (PAN)	42.76	Nora Rodríguez (COL)	41.54
Pentathlon	Edith Noeding (PER)	3991	Lucía Vaamonde (VEN)	3825	Simone Krauthausen (PER)	3443

== Medal table (unofficial) ==
* Host nation (Panama)

Rank	Nation	Gold	Silver	Bronze	Total
1	Venezuela (VEN)	11	12	10	33
2	Colombia (COL)	10	6	8	24
3	Panama (PAN)*	8	7	9	24
4	Peru (PER)	5	9	7	21
Totals (4 entries)		34	34	34	102
