= Leandro Civil =

Cuban middle-distance runner (1948–2025)

Personal information
- Born: 31 March 1948 Puerto Padre, Cuba
- Died: 14 April 2025 (aged 77) Havana, Cuba

Sport
- Sport: Track and field
Medal record
Representing Cuba
Pan American Games
Silver medal – second place	1975 Mexico City	800m
Central American and Caribbean Games
Gold medal – first place	1974 Santo Domingo	800m
Bronze medal – third place	1978 Medellin	800m

Leandro Félix Civil Jarvis (31 March 1948 – 14 April 2025) was a Cuban middle distance runner who competed in the 1976 Summer Olympics. He died on 14 April 2025, at the age of 77.

== International competitions ==
Year	Competition	Venue	Position	Event	Notes
Representing Cuba
1970	Universiade	Turin, Italy	6th (sf)	800 m	1:50.2
1970	Universiade	Turin, Italy	7th	4 × 400 m relay	3:09.5
1971	Central American and Caribbean Championships	Kingston, Jamaica	2nd	800 m	1:49.7
1971	Central American and Caribbean Championships	Kingston, Jamaica	2nd	4 × 400 m relay	3:10.1
1971	Pan American Games	Cali, Colombia	5th	800 m	1:50.03
1971	Pan American Games	Cali, Colombia	6th	4 × 400 m relay	3:08.9
1973	Central American and Caribbean Championships	Maracaibo, Venezuela	1st	800 m	1:49.8
1973	Central American and Caribbean Championships	Maracaibo, Venezuela	2nd	4 × 400 m relay	3:10.1
1973	Universiade	Moscow, Soviet Union	14th (h)	800 m	1:51.7
1974	Central American and Caribbean Games	Santo Domingo, Dominican Republic	1st	800 m	1:48.43
1975	Pan American Games	Mexico City, Mexico	2nd	800 m	1:48.75
1976	Olympic Games	Montreal, Canada	12th (sf)	800 m	1:47.31
1978	Central American and Caribbean Games	Medellín, Colombia	3rd	800 m	1:47.66
1979	Pan American Games	San Juan, Puerto Rico	6th	800 m	1:49.5
1979	Pan American Games	San Juan, Puerto Rico	11th	1500 m	3:52.4
