= 1970 South American Junior Championships in Athletics =

VIII South American Junior Championships in Athletics
- Dates: October 9–12
- Host city: Cali, Colombia
- Venue: Estadio Olímpico Pascual Guerrero
- Level: Under-19
- Events: 28
- Participation: about 194 athletes from 9 nations

The eighth South American Junior Championships in Athletics were held in Cali, Colombia, at the Estadio Olímpico Pascual Guerrero between October 9–12, 1970.

== Participation (unofficial) ==
Detailed result lists can be found on the "World Junior Athletics History" website. An unofficial count yields the number of about 194 athletes from about 9 countries: Argentina (35), Brazil (30), Chile (29), Colombia (33), Ecuador (16), Paraguay (2), Peru (21), Uruguay (5), Venezuela (23).

== Medal summary ==
Medal winners are published for men and women Complete results can be found on the "World Junior Athletics History" website.

=== Men ===
Event	Gold		Silver		Bronze	
100 metres	Julio Escobar (COL)	10.9	Augusto Marchinaris (PER)	11.0	Abdala Bucaram (ECU)	11.0
200 metres	Julio Escobar (COL)	21.6	Rubén Paulo (ARG)	21.9	Jorge Villanueva (ARG)	22.1
400 metres	José Báez (ARG)	49.3	Demetrio Pérez (PER)	50.2	Augusto Marchinaris (PER)	50.3
800 metres	Héctor López (VEN)	1:49.9	José Báez (ARG)	1:53.6	Elio Carraveta (BRA)	1:54.9
1500 metres	Guillermo Martínez (COL)	4:01.8	Luis Castro (ECU)	4:04.7	Ernesto Barrantes (COL)	4:05.3
3000 metres	Guillermo Martínez (COL)	8:45.7	Luis Castro (ECU)	8:46.9	Jorge Pavón (ECU)	8:58.2
110 metres hurdles	Francisco Rosetto (ARG)	15.2	Antonio Varela (COL)	15.4	Fernando García (CHI)	15.7
400 metres hurdles	Eduardo Rodrigues (BRA)	55.6	Pelayo Arrieta (CHI)	56.2	Eduardo Pini (BRA)	56.3
1500 metres steeplechase	José González (CHI)	4:29.4	Carlos Pinheiro (BRA)	4:31.7	Ernesto Barrantes (COL)	4:32.0
4 × 100 metres relay						
4 × 400 metres relay	Colombia; Nelson Alfaro; Jorge Solarte; Arutor Rodríguez; Jorge Velázquez	3:19.8	Venezuela; Pedro Díaz; Omar Elvitar; Jesús Testa; Héctor López	3:20.0	Argentina; Juan Italiana; Luis Molina; Jorge Villanueva; Rubén Paulo	3:20.8
High jump	Darío Pignataro (ARG)	1.86	Oscar Rodríguez (CHI)	1.85	Paulo Pérez (CHI)	1.85
Pole vault	Augusto León (PER)	4.00	Timoteo Buckwalter (ARG)	3.90	Eduardo Koike (BRA)	3.70
Long jump	Márcio Lomónaco (BRA)	7.09	Ricardo Otazú (ARG)	7.07	Aníbal Cabrera (ARG)	6.94
Triple jump	Aníbal Cabrera (ARG)	13.99	Ricardo Otazú (ARG)	13.92	Paulo Pinto (BRA)	13.73
Shot put	Carlos Elías (ARG)	15.94	Jesús Ramos (VEN)	15.18	José Querubim (BRA)	14.77
Discus throw	José Sarti (ARG)	41.74	Jaime Mathinson (VEN)	37.32	Alejandro Serrano (CHI)	36.32
Hammer throw	Jorge Mazzeo (ARG)	45.42	Jorge Cicery (ARG)	44.22	Cândido Maurício (BRA)	42.34
Javelin throw	Jaime Mathinson (VEN)	60.46	Fernando Hornos (CHI)	57.52	Christian Kittsteiner (CHI)	55.60
Pentathlon*	Mário Grise (BRA)	3707	Darío Pignataro (ARG)	3658	Luis Díaz (CHI)	3629

* = another source rather states: Hexathlon

=== Women ===
Event	Gold		Silver		Bronze	
100 metres	Irene Fitzner (ARG)	12.4	Edith Noeding (PER)	12.5	Lourdes Vargas (VEN)	12.6
200 metres	Irene Fitzner (ARG)	25.2	Beatriz Allocco (ARG)	25.3	Ana Maquilón (COL)	25.4
100 metres hurdles	Edith Noeding (PER)	14.7	Lucía Liria (ARG)	15.2	Amaya Barturen (CHI)	15.2
4 × 100 metres relay	Argentina; Alicia Masuccio; Patricia Morone; Beatriz Allocco; Irene Fitzner	47.9	Brazil; Rosa Barros; Hildegard Krause; Nair Konno; Solange da Silva	48.6	Venezuela; Lourdes Vargas; Trinidad Castillo; Adriana Marchena; Zulay Montaño	48.8
High jump	Patricia Mantero (PER)	1.50	Verónica Justiniano (CHI)	1.45	Beatriz Arancibia (CHI)	1.45
Long jump	Amaya Barturen (CHI)	5.60	Edith Noeding (PER)	5.55	Sofía Módica (ARG)	5.50
Shot put	Sofía Módica (ARG)	11.45	Ana María Mellado (CHI)	11.44	Luz María Quiñonez (ECU)	11.34
Discus throw	Ana María Mellado (CHI)	42.13	María Schutz (ARG)	36.60	Elvira Ulloa (VEN)	36.41
Javelin throw	Verónica Díaz (CHI)	40.18	Irani Milani (BRA)	37.36	Mercedes Olivera (ARG)	36.58

== Medal table (unofficial) ==
* Host nation (Colombia)

Rank	Nation	Gold	Silver	Bronze	Total
1	Argentina	11	10	5	26
2	Colombia*	5	1	3	9
3	Chile	4	5	7	16
4	Peru	3	4	1	8
5	Brazil	3	3	6	12
6	Venezuela	2	3	3	8
7	Ecuador	0	2	3	5
Totals (7 entries)		28	28	28	84
