= Víctor Patíñez =

Venezuelan sprinter

Personal information
- Nationality: Venezuelan
- Born: 8 November 1949 (age 76) El Tigre, Venezuela
- Height: 1.85 m (6 ft 1 in)
- Weight: 82 kg (181 lb)

Sport
- Sport: Sprinting
- Event: 4 × 400 metres relay

Víctor Patíñez (born 8 November 1949) is a Venezuelan sprinter. He competed in the men's 4 × 400 metres relay at the 1968 Summer Olympics.

== International competitions ==
Year	Competition	Venue	Position	Event	Notes
Representing Venezuela
1968	Olympic Games	Mexico City, Mexico	13th (h)	4 × 400 m relay	3:07.65
1971	Pan American Games	Cali, Colombia	12th (sf)	400 m	48.46
1971	Pan American Games	Cali, Colombia	10th (h)	4 × 400 m relay	3:36.7
1973	Bolivarian Games	Panama City, Panama	1st	200 m	20.97
1973	Bolivarian Games	Panama City, Panama	2nd	400 m	46.63
1973	Bolivarian Games	Panama City, Panama	1st	4 × 400 m relay	3:09.3
1973	Central American and Caribbean Championships	Maracaibo, Venezuela	3rd	400 m	47.2
1973	Central American and Caribbean Championships	Maracaibo, Venezuela	3rd	4 × 400 m relay	3:10.4
1974	Central American and Caribbean Games	Santo Domingo, Dominican Republic	2nd	4 × 400 m relay	3:07.23
1974	South American Championships	Santiago, Chile	3rd	200 m	21.7
1974	South American Championships	Santiago, Chile	1st	400 m	46.6
1974	South American Championships	Santiago, Chile	2nd	4 × 100 m relay	40.7
1974	South American Championships	Santiago, Chile	1st	4 × 400 m relay	3:10.7

== Personal bests ==
- 400 metres – 46.3 (1973)
