= Carmela Bolívar =

Peruvian sprinter

Personal information
- Full name: Carmela Bolívar Ríos
- Nationality: Peruvian
- Born: 23 April 1957 (age 69)
- Height: 1.57 m (5 ft 2 in)
- Weight: 53 kg (117 lb)

Sport
- Sport: Sprinting
- Event: 100 metres

Carmela Bolívar Ríos (born 23 April 1957) is a retired Peruvian sprinter. She competed in the women's 100 metres at the 1980 Summer Olympics.

== International competitions ==
Year	Competition	Venue	Position	Event	Notes
Representing Peru
1971	South American Championships	Lima, Peru	7th (h)	100 m	12.6
1971	South American Championships	Lima, Peru	6th	200 m	26.3
1971	South American Championships	Lima, Peru	2nd	4 × 100 m relay	47.6
1972	South American Junior Championships	Asunción, Paraguay	2nd	100 m	12.7
1972	South American Junior Championships	Asunción, Paraguay	1st	200 m	25.5
1972	South American Junior Championships	Asunción, Paraguay	1st	4 × 100 m relay	49.4
1973	Bolivarian Games	Panama City, Panama	2nd	100 m	11.8
1973	Bolivarian Games	Panama City, Panama	2nd	200 m	24.9 (w)
1973	Bolivarian Games	Panama City, Panama	2nd	4 × 100 m relay	47.5
1973	South American Youth Championships	Comodoro Rivadavia, Argentina	1st	100 m	13.0
1973	South American Youth Championships	Comodoro Rivadavia, Argentina	1st	200 m	26.4
1973	South American Youth Championships	Comodoro Rivadavia, Argentina	2nd	4 × 100 m relay	49.2
1974	South American Championships	Santiago, Chile	7th	100 m	12.5
1974	South American Championships	Santiago, Chile	9th (h)	200 m	25.5
1974	South American Championships	Santiago, Chile	3rd	4 × 100 m relay	47.5
1974	South American Junior Championships	Lima, Peru	1st	100 m	11.8
1974	South American Junior Championships	Lima, Peru	2nd	200 m	24.6
1974	South American Junior Championships	Lima, Peru	2nd	4 × 100 m relay	47.7
1975	South American Championships	Rio de Janeiro, Brazil	2nd	100 m	11.9
1975	South American Championships	Rio de Janeiro, Brazil	4th	200 m	25.0
1975	South American Championships	Rio de Janeiro, Brazil	3rd	4 × 100 m relay	48.5
1975	Pan American Games	Mexico City, Mexico	13th (sf)	100 m	11.94
1975	Pan American Games	Mexico City, Mexico	12th (sf)	200 m	24.85
1977	Bolivarian Games	La Paz, Bolivia	1st	100 m	12.07
1977	Bolivarian Games	La Paz, Bolivia	3rd	200 m	24.64
1977	Bolivarian Games	La Paz, Bolivia	1st	4 × 100 m relay	47.62
1977	South American Championships	Montevideo, Uruguay	3rd	100 m	12.27
1977	South American Championships	Montevideo, Uruguay	11th (h)	200 m	26.3
1978	Southern Cross Games	La Paz, Bolivia	2nd	100 m	11.83
1978	Southern Cross Games	La Paz, Bolivia	2nd	200 m	23.55
1979	Pan American Games	San Juan, Puerto Rico	10th (sf)	100 m	11.89
1979	Pan American Games	San Juan, Puerto Rico	11th (sf)	200 m	24.38 (w)
1979	South American Championships	Bucaramanga, Colombia	2nd	100 m	11.8
1979	South American Championships	Bucaramanga, Colombia	5th	200 m	24.3
1979	South American Championships	Bucaramanga, Colombia	10th (h)	400 m	58.3
1979	South American Championships	Bucaramanga, Colombia	5th	4 × 100 m relay	47.6
1979	South American Championships	Bucaramanga, Colombia	6th	4 × 400 m relay	3:58.3
1980	Olympcs Games	Moscow, Soviet Union	28th (h)	100 m	12.07
1980	Olympcs Games	Moscow, Soviet Union	29th (h)	200 m	25.33
1981	South American Championships	La Paz, Bolivia	1st	100 m	11.2
1981	South American Championships	La Paz, Bolivia	3rd	200 m	24.0
1981	South American Championships	La Paz, Bolivia	2nd	4 × 100 m relay	46.7
1981	Bolivarian Games	Barquisimeto, Venezuela	1st	100 m	11.91 (w)
1981	Bolivarian Games	Barquisimeto, Venezuela	2nd	200 m	24.59
1981	Bolivarian Games	Barquisimeto, Venezuela	2nd	4 × 100 m relay	47.5
1981	Bolivarian Games	Barquisimeto, Venezuela	3rd	4 × 400 m relay	4:12.90
1982	Southern Cross Games	Santa Fe, Argentina	1st	100 m	12.40
1982	Southern Cross Games	Santa Fe, Argentina	3rd	200 m	24.99
1983	World Championships	Helsinki, Finland	39th (h)	100 m	12.31

== Personal bests ==
Outdoor

- 100 metres – 11.2 (1981)
- 200 metres – 23.55 (1978)
