= Darcy Pereira =

Brazilian middle-distance runner

Personal information
- Full name: Darcy Leão Pereira
- Born: 19 December 1952

Sport
- Sport: Sprinting
- Event(s): 800 metres, 1500 metres

Darcy Leão Pereira (born 18 January 1945) is a retired Brazilian middle-distance runner. He won several medals at continental level.

== International competitions ==
Year	Competition	Venue	Position	Event	Notes
Representing Brazil
1969	South American Championships	Quito, Ecuador	2nd	800 m	1:55.5
1969	South American Championships	Quito, Ecuador	2nd	4 × 400 m relay	3:13.2
1971	Pan American Games	Cali, Colombia	14th (sf)	800 m	1:54.33
1974	South American Championships	Santiago, Chile	2nd	800 m	1:50.6
1974	South American Championships	Santiago, Chile	2nd	1500 m	3:51.2
1974	South American Championships	Santiago, Chile	4th	4 × 400 m relay	3:13.1
1975	South American Championships	Rio de Janeiro, Brazil	2nd	800 m	1:51.4
1975	South American Championships	Rio de Janeiro, Brazil	–	1500 m	DQ
1975	Pan American Games	Mexico City, Mexico	8th	800 m	1:57.25
1975	Pan American Games	Mexico City, Mexico	13th (h)	1500 m	4:05.04
1977	South American Championships	Montevideo, Uruguay	2nd	5000 m	14:25.4
