= Eric Phillips (athlete) =

Venezuelan sprinter

Personal information
- Full name: Eric Davis Phillips Roberts
- Nationality: Venezuelan
- Born: 30 August 1954 (age 71)
- Height: 1.74 m (5 ft 9 in)
- Weight: 68 kg (150 lb)

Sport
- Sport: Sprinting
- Event: 400 metres

Eric Davis Phillips Roberts (born 30 August 1954) is a retired Venezuelan sprinter. He competed in the men's 400 metres at the 1972 Summer Olympics.

His personal best in the event is 46.0 set in 1975.

== International competitions ==
Year	Competition	Venue	Position	Event	Notes
Representing Venezuela
1971	South American Championships	Lima, Peru	5th	400 m	48.6
1971	South American Championships	Lima, Peru	1st	4 × 400 m relay	3:14.8
1972	Olympic Games	Munich, West Germany	32nd (qf)	400 m	46.97
1972	Olympic Games	Munich, West Germany	12th (h)	4 × 400 m relay	3:06.99
1973	Bolivarian Games	Panama City, Panama	3rd	400 m	47.2
1973	Bolivarian Games	Panama City, Panama	1st	4 × 400 m relay	3:09.3
1973	Central American and Caribbean Championships	Maracaibo, Venezuela	6th	200 m	20.8
1973	Central American and Caribbean Championships	Maracaibo, Venezuela	4th	400 m	47.5
1973	Central American and Caribbean Championships	Maracaibo, Venezuela	4th	4 × 400 m relay	3:10.4
1974	Central American and Caribbean Games	Santo Domingo, Dominican Republic	5th	400 m	46.97
1974	Central American and Caribbean Games	Santo Domingo, Dominican Republic	2nd	4 × 400 m relay	3:07.23
1974	South American Championships	Santiago, Chile	2nd	200 m	21.5
1974	South American Championships	Santiago, Chile	2nd	400 m	46.8
1974	South American Championships	Santiago, Chile	2nd	4 × 100 m relay	40.7
1974	South American Championships	Santiago, Chile	1st	4 × 400 m relay	3:10.7
1977	Central American and Caribbean Championships	Xalapa, Mexico	2nd	4 × 400 m relay	3:10.39
1979	Central American and Caribbean Championships	Guadalajara, Mexico	2nd	4 × 400 m relay	3:08.9
1981	Bolivarian Games	Barquisimeto, Venezuela	5th	200 m	21.60
1981	Bolivarian Games	Barquisimeto, Venezuela	3rd	400 m	47.31
1981	Bolivarian Games	Barquisimeto, Venezuela	1st	4 × 400 m relay	3:08.50
1982	Central American and Caribbean Games	Havana, Cuba	4th	400 m	47.15
1982	Central American and Caribbean Games	Havana, Cuba	4th	800 m	1:48.05
1983	Central American and Caribbean Championships	Havana, Cuba	3rd	4 × 400 m relay	3:08.56
