= Héctor López (athlete) =

Venezuelan middle-distance runner

Personal information
- Full name: Héctor Enio López García
- Nationality: Venezuelan
- Born: 13 September 1952 (age 73) Caracas, Venezuela
- Height: 1.82 m (6 ft 0 in)
- Weight: 74 kg (163 lb)

Sport
- Sport: Middle-distance running
- Event: 800 metres

Héctor Enio López García (born 13 September 1952) is a retired Venezuelan middle-distance runner. He competed in the men's 800 metres at the 1972 Summer Olympics.

His personal best in the event is 1:48.99 set in 1974.

== International competitions ==
Year	Competition	Venue	Position	Event	Notes
1970	Central American and Caribbean Games	Panama City, Panama	4th	4 × 400 m relay	3:09.1
1970	South American Junior Championships	Cali, Colombia	7th	800 m	51.4
1970	South American Junior Championships	Cali, Colombia	1st	800 m	1:49.9
1970	South American Junior Championships	Cali, Colombia	2nd	4 × 400 m relay	3:20.0
1971	Central American and Caribbean Championships	Kingston, Jamaica	6th	800 m	1:51.9
1972	Olympic Games	Munich, West Germany	37th (h)	800 m	1:50.8
1973	Bolivarian Games	Panama City, Panama	1st	800 m	1:52.0
1974	Central American and Caribbean Games	Santo Domingo, Dominican Republic	3rd	800 m	1:48.99
1974	Central American and Caribbean Games	Santo Domingo, Dominican Republic	2nd	4 × 400 m relay	3:07.23
1974	South American Championships	Santiago, Chile	1st	800 m	1:50.4
1974	South American Championships	Santiago, Chile	1st	4 × 400 m relay	3:10.7
