= Jesús Rico (sprinter) =

Venezuelan sprinter

Personal information
- Nationality: Venezuelan
- Born: 4 July 1950 (age 76)
- Height: 1.72 m (5 ft 8 in)
- Weight: 62 kg (137 lb)

Sport
- Sport: Sprinting
- Event: 4 × 100 metres relay

Jesús Rico (born 4 July 1950) is a Venezuelan sprinter. He competed in the men's 4 × 100 metres relay at the 1972 Summer Olympics.

== International competitions ==
Year	Competition	Venue	Position	Event	Notes
Representing Venezuela
1971	Central American and Caribbean Championships	Maracaibo, Venezuela	3rd	4 × 100 m relay	40.7
1971	Pan American Games	Cali, Colombia	24th (h)	200 m	22.26
1971	Pan American Games	Cali, Colombia	5th	4 × 100 m relay	40.53
1972	Olympic Games	Munich, West Germany	13th (sf)	4 × 100 m relay	39.74
1973	Bolivarian Games	Panama City, Panama	1st	4 × 100 m relay	40.8
1974	South American Championships	Santiago, Chile	2nd	100 m	10.5
1974	South American Championships	Santiago, Chile	2nd	4 × 100 m relay	40.7

== Personal bests ==
- 100 metres – 10.3 (1971)
