= Athletics at the 1974 Central American and Caribbean Games =

Athletics at the XII CAC Games
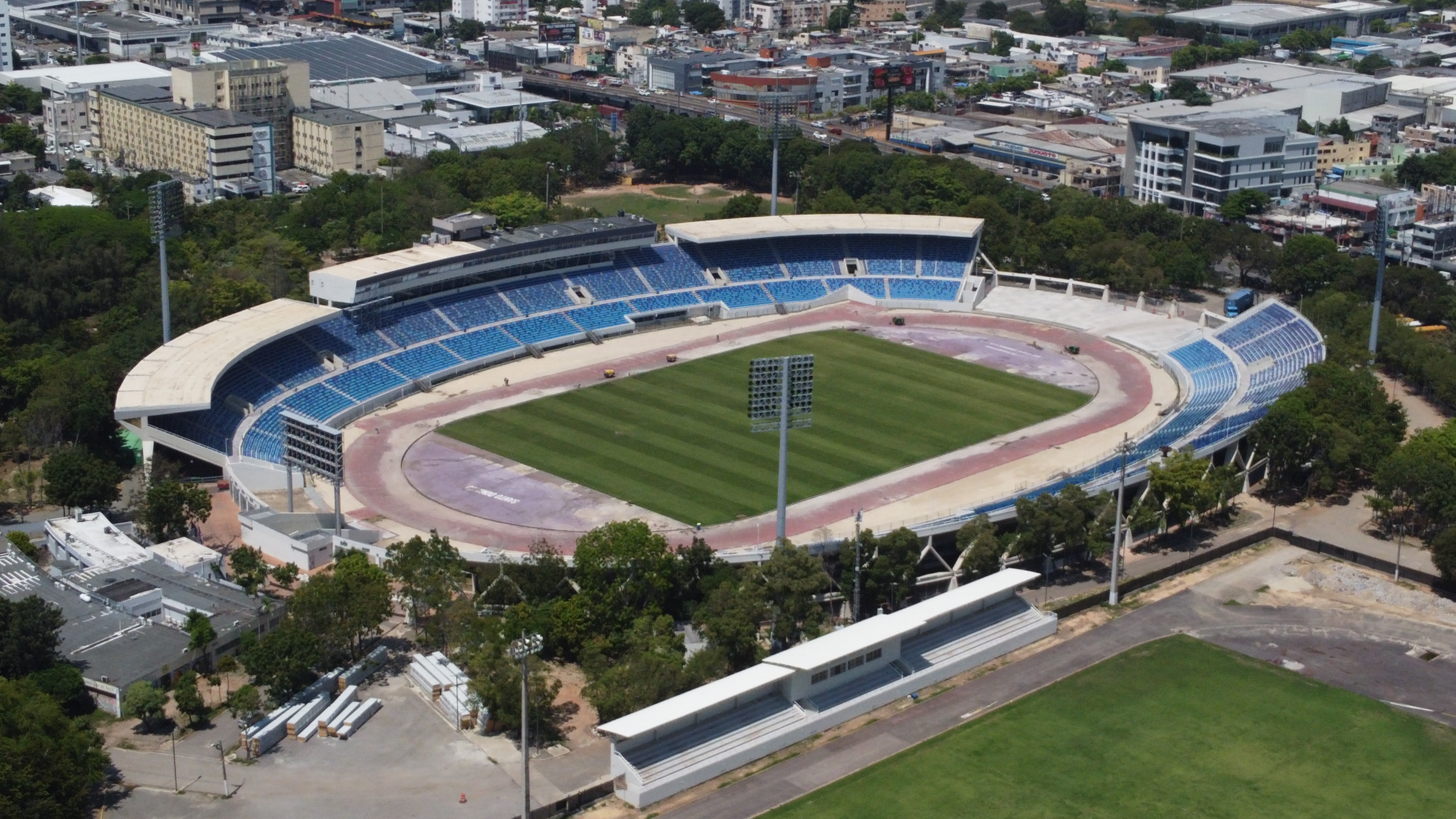
- Host stadium (shown in 2024)
- Dates: 5–12 March 1974
- Host city: Santo Domingo, Dominican Republic
- Venue: Estadio Olímpico Juan Pablo Duarte
- Events: 35
- Participation: 278 athletes from 21 nations
- Records set: 23 GR

The athletics competition in the 1974 Central American and Caribbean Games were held at the Estadio Olímpico Juan Pablo Duarte in Santo Domingo, Dominican Republic.

It was the last time that three athletes from one country were allowed to compete in an individual event making a clean sweep of medals possible.

== Medal summary ==
=== Men's events ===
Event	Gold		Silver		Bronze	
100 metres	Silvio Leonard; Cuba	10.49	José Triana; Cuba	10.67	Pablo Montes; Cuba	10.77
200 metres	Silvio Leonard; Cuba	20.99	Pablo Bandomo; Cuba	21.37	José Triana; Cuba	21.54
400 metres	Alberto Juantorena; Cuba	45.52	Seymour Newman; Jamaica	46.34	Félix Mangual; Puerto Rico	46.42
800 metres	Leandro Civil; Cuba	1:48.43	Luis Medina; Cuba	1:48.68	Héctor López; Venezuela	1:48.99
1500 metres	Luis Medina; Cuba	3:44.18	José González; Venezuela	3:44.52	Carlos Martínez; Mexico	3:44.90
5000 metres	Víctor Mora; Colombia	13:54.20	Jairo Correa; Colombia	14:03.00	José Neri; Mexico	14:04.00
10,000 metres	Domingo Tibaduiza; Colombia	30:39.4	Rafael Pérez; Costa Rica	30:41.0	Pedro Miranda; Mexico	30:41.2
Marathon	Gilberto Serna; Colombia	2:28:08	Agustín Reyes; Puerto Rico	2:32:08	José de Jesús; Puerto Rico	2:32:54
110 metres hurdles (wind: +2.1 m/s)	Alejandro Casañas; Cuba	13.80	Guillermo Núñez; Cuba	13.93	Francisco Dumeng; Puerto Rico	14.10
400 metres hurdles	Fabio Zúñiga; Colombia	50.61	Guillermo Núñez; Cuba	50.87	Félix Mangual; Puerto Rico	51.65
3000 metre steeplechase	José Cobo; Cuba	8:50.8	Antonio Villanueva; Mexico	8:52.0	Lucirio Garrido; Venezuela	8:54.8
4 × 100 metres relay	Cuba; José Triana; Silvio Leonard; Pablo Montes; Pablo Bandomo	39.62	Dominican Republic; Porfirio Veras; Julio Meades; Enrique Javier; Gil Fortuna	40.35	Netherlands Antilles; Elmer Vorn; Edwin Nar; Henry Braafhart; Edsel Trompet	41.79
4 × 400 metres relay	Cuba; Eduardo García; Eddy Gutiérrez; Antonio Álvarez; Alberto Juantorena	3:06.36	Venezuela; Víctor Patíñez; Héctor López; Félix Mata; Erick Phillips	3:07.23	Jamaica; Noel Gray; Seymour Newman; Anthony Davis; Clive Barriffe	3:07.52
20 kilometre road walk	Raúl González; Mexico	1:35:23	Pedro Aroche; Mexico	1:35:33	Ernesto Alfaro; Colombia	1:38:53
High jump	Richard Spencer; Cuba	2.10	Amado Olaguiber; Cuba	2.07	Gilberto Campbell; Cuba	2.04
Pole vault	Roberto Moré; Cuba	4.95	Juan Laza; Cuba	4.75	Edgardo Rivera; Puerto Rico	4.55
Long jump	Wilfredo Maisonave; Puerto Rico	7.44	Milán Matos; Cuba	7.43	Francisco Gómez; Cuba	7.41
Triple jump	Pedro Pérez; Cuba	17.01w	Armando Herrera; Cuba	16.37w	Juvenal Pérez; Cuba	15.91
Shot put	José Carreño; Venezuela	16.20	Nicolás Hernández; Cuba	16.09	Pedro Serrano; Puerto Rico	15.85
Discus throw	Julián Morrinson; Cuba	58.10	Javier Moreno; Cuba	51.04	Ignacio Reinosa; Puerto Rico	49.30
Hammer throw	Pedro Garbey; Cuba	61.50	Víctor Suárez; Cuba	59.16	Genovevo Morejón; Cuba	57.58
Javelin throw	Raúl Fernández; Cuba	75.30	Juan Jarvis; Cuba	69.16	Salomón Robbins; Mexico	67.10
Decathlon	Jesús Mirabal; Cuba	7470	Rigoberto Salazar; Cuba	7305	Orlando Pedroso; Cuba	7060

=== Women's events ===
Event	Gold		Silver		Bronze	
100 metres	Carmen Valdés; Cuba	11.55	Silvia Chivás; Cuba	11.65	Lelieth Hodges; Jamaica	11.75
200 metres	Carmen Valdés; Cuba	23.76	Asunción Acosta; Cuba	24.21	Diva Bishop; Panama	24.39
400 metres	Aurelia Pentón; Cuba	52.27	Carmen Trustée; Cuba	52.91	Asunción Acosta; Cuba	53.92
800 metres	Charlotte Bradley; Mexico	2:04.55	Aurelia Pentón; Cuba	2:05.43	Enriqueta Nava; Mexico	2:05.89
100 metres hurdles	Marlene Elejalde; Cuba	14.53	Mercedes Román; Mexico	14.69	Raquel Martínez; Cuba	14.74
4 × 100 metres relay	Cuba; Marlene Elejalde; Carmen Valdés; Asunción Acosta; Silvia Chivás	44.90	Panama; Diva Bishop; Margarita Martínez; Maritza Escalona; Beatriz Aparicio	47.42	Mexico; Mercedes Román; María Ángeles Cato; Mireya Vázquez; Corina Garduño	48.02
High jump	Lucía Duquet; Cuba	1.74	Elisa Ávila; Mexico	1.74	Maritza García; Cuba	1.71
Long jump	Marcia Garbey; Cuba	6.48	Ana Alexander; Cuba	6.07	Dora Thompson; Cuba	5.75
Shot put	María Elena Sarría; Cuba	14.60	Hilda Ramírez; Cuba	14.40	Caridad Romero; Cuba	13.82
Discus throw	Carmen Romero; Cuba	54.70	María Cristina Betancourt; Cuba	52.20	Salvadora Vargas; Cuba	41.22
Javelin throw	Tomasa Núñez; Cuba	47.58	María Beltrán; Cuba	47.46	Gladys González; Venezuela	46.58
Pentathlon	Ciska Jansen; Netherlands Antilles	4014	Angela Carbonell; Cuba	3867	Mercedes Román; Mexico	3827

== Medal table ==
Rank	Nation	Gold	Silver	Bronze	Total
1	Cuba (CUB)	27	23	13	63
2	Colombia (COL)	4	1	1	6
3	Mexico (MEX)	2	4	7	13
4	Venezuela (VEN)	1	2	3	6
5	Netherlands Antilles (AHO)	1	0	1	2
6	Puerto Rico (PUR)	0	1	7	8
7	Jamaica (JAM)	0	1	2	3
8	Panama (PAN)	0	1	1	2
9	Costa Rica (CRC)	0	1	0	1
9	Dominican Republic (DOM)	0	1	0	1
Totals (10 entries)		35	35	35	105

== Participation ==
- Bahamas (1)
- Barbados (6)
- Belize (5)
- Colombia (16)
- Costa Rica (1)
- Cuba (75)
- Dominican Republic (34)
- Guatemala (5)
- Guyana (1)
- Haiti (2)
- Honduras (3)
- Jamaica (7)
- Mexico (26)
- Netherlands Antilles (12)
- Nicaragua (4)
- Panama (8)
- Puerto Rico (35)
- El Salvador (10)
- Suriname (3)
- United States Virgin Islands (4)
- Venezuela (20)
