= Lennox Stewart =

Trinidad and Tobago athlete (1949–2021)

Personal information
- Nationality: Trinidad and Tobago
- Born: 21 September 1949
- Died: 17 June 2021 (aged 71)

Sport
- Sport: Middle-distance running
- Event: 800 metres

Lennox Roger Stewart (21 September 1949 – 17 June 2021) was a Trinidadian middle-distance runner. He competed in the men's 800 metres at the 1972 Summer Olympics.

Stewart was an All-American for the North Carolina Tar Heels track and field team in the 1970s, placing 8th in the 800 m at the 1972 NCAA University Division Outdoor Track and Field Championships.
