= 1977 South American Championships in Athletics =

- Dates: 4–6 November
- Host city: Montevideo, Uruguay
- Venue: Pista del Parque Batlle y Ordoñez
- Events: 37
- Participation: 253 athletes from 9 nations
- Records set: 5 CR

The 1977 South American Championships in Athletics were held at the Pista del Parque Batlle y Ordoñez (today Pista de Atletismo Darwin Piñeyrúa) in Montevideo, Uruguay, between 4 and 6 November 1977.

== Medal summary ==
=== Men's events ===
Event	Gold		Silver		Bronze	
100 metres (wind: +1.5 m/s)	Rui da Silva; Brazil	10.3	Katsuhiko Nakaia; Brazil	10.4	Miguel Sulbarán; Venezuela	10.6
200 metres (wind: 0.0 m/s)	Rui da Silva; Brazil	21.3	Katsuhiko Nakaia; Brazil	21.7	Hipólito Brown; Venezuela	22.1
400 metres	Delmo da Silva; Brazil	47.70	Ariel Santolaya; Chile	47.71	Djalma de Oliveira; Brazil	48.24
800 metres	Agberto Guimarães; Brazil	1:52.4	Omar Amdematten; Argentina	1:52.8	Ricardo Vigo; Argentina	1:53.3
1500 metres	José González; Venezuela	3:51.7	Emilio Ulloa; Chile	3:51.7	Cosme do Nascimento; Brazil	3:51.7
5000 metres	Domingo Tibaduiza; Colombia	14:24.4	Darcy Pereira; Brazil	14:25.4	Jairo Correa; Colombia	14:26.0
10,000 metres	Domingo Tibaduiza; Colombia	29:44.2	Aloisio de Araújo; Brazil	29:57.0	Carlos Alves; Brazil	30:12.3
Marathon	Héctor Rodríguez; Colombia	2:19:56	Víctor Rodríguez; Colombia	2:24:48	Elói Schleder; Brazil	2:26:48
110 metres hurdles (wind: 0.0 m/s)	Oscar Marín; Venezuela	14.97	Jesús Villegas; Colombia	15.04	Carlos dos Santos; Brazil	15.23
400 metres hurdles	Moisés Zambrano; Venezuela	53.7	Donizete Soares; Brazil	54.1	Joelmerson de Carvalho; Brazil	54.4
3000 metres steeplechase	Jairo Correa; Colombia	9:00.5	Lucirio Garrido; Venezuela	9:01.5	Abel Córdoba; Argentina	9:13.0
4 × 100 metres relay	Brazil; Antônio Carlos dos Santos; Nelson dos Santos; Rui da Silva; Katsuhiko Nakaya	41.4	Venezuela; José Chacín; Manuel Briceño; Ely Zabala; Hipólito Brown	41.7	Uruguay; Servio Labruna; Luis Sánchez; Luis Barbosa; José Gonçalves	42.1
4 × 400 metres relay	Brazil; Djalma de Oliveira; Delmo da Silva; Pedro Teixeira; Donizete Soares	3:15.1	Venezuela; Hipólito Brown; E. López; Alexis Herrera; Moisés Zambrano	3:17.4	Chile; Ariel Santolaya; Cristián Molina; Emilio Ulloa; Alfredo Edwards	3:23.1
20 kilometres road walk	Enrique Peña; Colombia	1:37:21 CR	Osvaldo Morejón; Bolivia	1:39:23	Rafael Vega; Colombia	1:40:14
High jump	Iraja Cecy; Brazil	2.05	Luis Arbulú; Peru	2.00	Luis Barrionuevo; Argentina	2.00
Pole vault	Renato Bortolocci; Brazil	4.40	Tito Steiner; Argentina	4.30	Fernando Hoces; Chile	4.10
Long jump	João Carlos de Oliveira; Brazil	7.95 CR	Hugo Meriano; Argentina	7.31	Ronald Raborg; Peru	7.22
Triple jump	João Carlos de Oliveira; Brazil	16.40	Angel Gagliano; Argentina	15.15	Francisco Pichott; Chile	14.87
Shot put	José Luiz Carabolante; Brazil	16.83	José Carreño; Venezuela	15.70	José Jacques; Brazil	15.62
Discus throw	Sérgio Thomé; Brazil	52.24	Modesto Barreto; Colombia	50.64	José Jacques; Brazil	46.42
Hammer throw	Daniel Gómez; Argentina	64.66 CR	Celso de Moraes; Brazil	63.52	Ivam Bertelli; Brazil	63.40
Javelin throw	Mario Sotomayor; Colombia	66.96	Paulo de Faría; Brazil	66.50	Angel Garmendia; Argentina	65.72
Decathlon	Tito Steiner; Argentina	7411	Renato Bortolocci; Brazil	7076	Ramón Montezuma; Venezuela	6976

=== Women's events ===
Event	Gold		Silver		Bronze	
100 metres (wind: +0.5 m/s)	Beatriz Allocco; Argentina	11.97	Beatriz Capotosto; Argentina	12.20	Carmela Bolívar; Peru; Carla Herencia; Chile	12.27
200 metres	Beatriz Allocco; Argentina	24.7	Sueli Machado; Brazil	25.2	Flavia Villar; Chile	25.3
400 metres	Eucaris Caicedo; Colombia	55.3	Adriana Marchena; Venezuela	56.48	Marcela López; Argentina	56.69
800 metres	Alejandra Ramos; Chile	2:12.3	Adriana Marchena; Venezuela	2:15.8	Aparecida Adão; Brazil	2:15.8
1500 metres	Alejandra Ramos; Chile	4:39.8	Maria Dias; Brazil	4:46.8	Mery Rojas; Bolivia	4:46.8
100 metres hurdles (wind: -0.5 m/s)	Edith Noeding; Peru	14.47	Themis Zambrzycki; Brazil	14.76	Maria Luisa Betioli; Brazil	14.80
4 × 100 metres relay	Argentina; Araceli Bruschini; Susana Perizzotti; Beatriz Capotosto; Beatriz Allocco	46.7	Chile; Flavia Villar; Carla Herencia; Verónica Kinzer; Pía Ábalos	47.8	Brazil; Maria Levien; Sueli Machado; Conceição Geremias; Bárbara do Nascimento	47.8
4 × 400 metres relay	Brazil; Tânia Miranda; Sueli Machado; Joyce Felipe dos Santos; Inoilde Cruz	3:49.7	Argentina; Graciela Escalada; Beatriz Allocco; Marcela López; Silvia Augsburger	3:53.4	Venezuela; Elsa Antúnez; Lourdes Nicola; Adriana Marchena; Yaneth Carvajal	3:55.2
High jump	Maria Luisa Betioli; Brazil	1.80 CR	Beatriz Bonfim; Brazil	1.70	Beatriz Arancibia; Chile	1.60
Long jump	Yvonne Neddermann; Argentina	5.65	Themis Zambrzycki; Brazil	5.49	Conceição Geremias; Brazil	5.49
Shot put	Maria Boso; Brazil	13.80	Lorena Prado; Chile	13.26	Marinalva dos Santos; Brazil	12.59
Discus throw	Odete Domingos; Brazil	51.56 CR	Thea Reinhardt; Brazil	49.68	Patricia Andrus; Venezuela	40.86
Javelin throw	Patricia Guerrero; Peru	45.46	Neuza Trolezzi; Brazil	42.92	Magali Lopes; Brazil	41.18
Pentathlon	Conceição Geremias; Brazil	3863	Themis Zambrzycki; Brazil	3856	Yvonne Neddermann; Argentina	3425

== Medal table ==
Rank	Nation	Gold	Silver	Bronze	Total
1	Brazil (BRA)	17	16	15	48
2	Colombia (COL)	7	3	2	12
3	Argentina (ARG)	6	6	6	18
4	Venezuela (VEN)	3	6	5	14
5	Chile (CHI)	2	4	6	12
6	Peru (PER)	2	1	2	5
7	Bolivia (BOL)	0	1	1	2
8	Uruguay (URU)	0	0	1	1
Totals (8 entries)		37	37	38	112

== Participating nations ==
- Argentina (40)
- Bolivia (8)
- Brazil (51)
- Chile (35)
- Colombia (23)
- Paraguay (19)
- Peru (6)
- Uruguay (38)
- Venezuela (33)
