= 1974 South American Championships in Athletics =

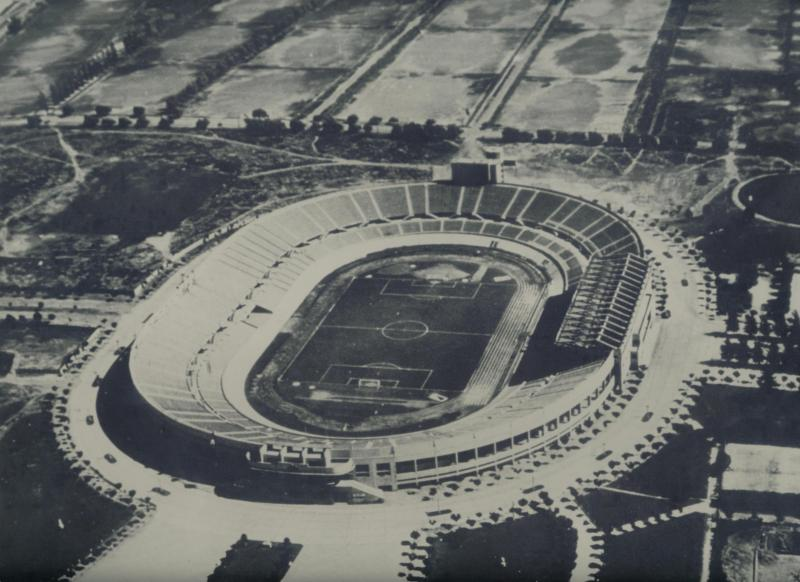
- Host stadium (shown in 1962)
- Dates: 16–21 April
- Host city: Santiago, Chile
- Venue: Estadio Nacional
- Events: 37
- Participation: 229 athletes from 8 nations

The 1974 South American Championships in Athletics were held at the Estadio Nacional in Santiago, Chile, between 16 and 21 April. The competition was supposed to take place in the spring of 1973 but the 1973 Chilean coup d'état forced its postponement to the following year.

It was the first edition that featured men's 20 kilometres walk, women's 1500 metres and 4 × 400 metres relay.

== Medal summary ==
=== Men's events ===
Event	Gold		Silver		Bronze	
100 metres	Rui da Silva; Brazil	10.5	Jesús Rico; Venezuela	10.5	José Chacín; Venezuela	10.6
200 metres	Rui da Silva; Brazil	21.2	Erick Phillips; Venezuela	21.5	Víctor Patínez; Venezuela	21.7
400 metres	Víctor Patínez; Venezuela	46.6	Erick Phillips; Venezuela	46.8	Pedro Teixeira; Brazil	48.1
800 metres	Héctor López; Venezuela	1:50.4	Darcy Pereira; Brazil	1:50.6	Reinel Suárez; Colombia	1:51.6
1500 metres	José González; Venezuela	3:48.8	Darcy Pereira; Brazil	3:51.2	Omar Amdematten; Argentina	3:52.6
5000 metres	Edmundo Warnke; Chile	14:17.6	Jairo Correa; Colombia	14:22.4	José Romão Silva; Brazil	14:22.8
10,000 metres	Jairo Correa; Colombia	29:27.3	Edmundo Warnke; Chile	29:32.8	Jairo Cubillos; Colombia	30:25.6
Marathon	José Ramírez; Chile	2:30:42	Gilberto Cerna; Colombia	2:32:27	Orides Alves; Brazil	2:34:46
110 metres hurdles	Oscar Marín; Venezuela	14.6	Márcio Lomónaco; Brazil	14.9	Roberto Gonzáles; Peru	15.0
400 metres hurdles	Francisco Rojas; Paraguay	52.1	Dorival Negrisoli; Brazil	53.1	Santiago Gordon; Chile	53.5
3000 metres steeplechase	José González; Venezuela	8:59.4 CR	Jorge Grosser; Chile	9:00.0	Lucirio Garrido; Venezuela	9:01.2
4 × 100 metres relay	Brazil; João Francisco; Jorge Mathias; Luiz Gonzaga da Silva; Rui da Silva	40.3	Venezuela; Jesús Rico; José Chacín; Erick Phillips; Víctor Patíñez	40.7	Argentina; Carlos Martínez; Carlos Bertotti; Gustavo Dubarbier; Alfredo Milano	41.1
4 × 400 metres relay	Venezuela; Héctor López; Erick Phillips; Cruz Padrón; John Alexander	3:10.7 CR	Argentina; Rubén Buscalia; José Pérez; Carlos Intaschi; Carlos Bertotti	3:12.7	Chile; Francisco Bozzo; Germán Jorquera; Ariel Santolaya; Claudio Muñoz	3:12.8
20 kilometres road walk	Adalberto Scorza; Argentina	1:46:24 CR	Rito Molina; Argentina	1:48:27	Antonio Moraga; Colombia	1:49:00
High jump	Luis Arbulú; Peru	2.06 CR	Luis Barrionuevo; Argentina	2.06	Roberto Abugattás; Peru	2.03
Pole vault	Ciro Valdés; Colombia	4.40	Luis Cárdenas; Peru	4.20	Tulio Moya; Chile	4.00
Long jump	Emilio Mazzeo; Argentina	7.29	Ronaldo Lobato; Brazil	7.21	João Carlos de Oliveira; Brazil	7.17
Triple jump	João Carlos de Oliveira; Brazil	16.34 =CR	Nelson Prudêncio; Brazil	16.09	Edgar Moreno; Venezuela	15.16
Shot put	Juan Turri; Argentina	17.09 CR	Nelson Fernandes; Brazil	15.96	José Carreño; Venezuela	15.81
Discus throw	Hernán Haddad; Chile	47.12	José Jacques; Brazil	46.56	Esteban Drapich; Argentina	46.52
Hammer throw	Darwin Piñeyrúa; Uruguay	62.99 CR	José Vallejo; Argentina	61.55	Celso de Moraes; Brazil	59.34
Javelin throw	Mario Sotomayor; Colombia	68.86	Paulo de Faria; Brazil	66.04	Humberto Vianna; Brazil	65.32
Decathlon	Ramón Montezuma; Venezuela	7000	Tito Steiner; Argentina	6964	Alfredo Silva; Chile	6772

=== Women's events ===
Event	Gold		Silver		Bronze	
100 metres	Conceição Geremias; Brazil	12.1	Elsy Rivas; Colombia	12.1	Belkis Fava; Argentina	12.1
200 metres	Elsy Rivas; Colombia	24.1	Angela Godoy; Argentina	24.7	Conceição Geremias; Brazil	24.7
400 metres	Eucaris Caicedo; Colombia	56.1	Adriana Marchena; Venezuela	57.0	Rosângela Verissimo; Brazil	57.1
800 metres	Ana María Nielsen; Argentina	2:11.9 CR	Rosângela Verissimo; Brazil	2:12.6	Carmen Oyé; Chile	2:13.9
1500 metres	Carmen Oyé; Chile	4:32.1 AR	Ana María Nielsen; Argentina	4:33.5	Iris Fernández; Argentina	4:41.7
100 metres hurdles	Edith Noeding; Peru	13.9 AR	Elisabeth Nunes; Brazil	14.4	Maria Luisa Betioli; Brazil	15.0
4 × 100 metres relay	Brazil; Conceição Geremias; Geralda de Souza; Elisabeth Nunes; Ivette Barbosa	47.3	Peru; Carmela Bolivár; Edith Noeding; Simone Krauthausen; Magaly Zumaeta	47.5	Venezuela; Elsa Antúnez; Trinidad Castillo; Alix Castillo; Doris Rivas	47.8
4 × 400 metres relay	Brazil; Valdéa Chagas; Ivette Barbosa; Conceição Geremias; Rosângela Verissimo	3:47.4 AR	Chile; Victoria Roa; Oriana Salas; Aurora Sáenz; Carmen Oyé	3:54.0	Venezuela; Adriana Marchena; Julia González; Elsa Antúnez; Ana Rojas	3:55.0
High jump	Maria Luisa Betioli; Brazil	1.75 AR	Edith Noeding; Peru	1.65	Beatriz Bonfim; Brazil	1.65
Long jump	Elisabeth Nunes; Brazil	6.06 CR	Conceição Geremias; Brazil	6.03	Edith Noeding; Peru	5.91
Shot put	Rosa Molina; Chile	14.93 CR	Maria Boso; Brazil	13.99	Miriam Yutronic; Chile	13.23
Discus throw	Miriam Yutronic; Chile	49.36 CR	Odete Domingos; Brazil	48.22	Gladys Ortega; Argentina	42.90
Javelin throw	Gladys González; Venezuela	49.86 CR	Ana María Campillay; Argentina	43.18	Verónica Díaz; Chile	42.46
Pentathlon	Edith Noeding; Peru	4170	Elisabeth Nunes; Brazil	3975	Maria Luisa Betioli; Brazil	3741

== Medal table ==
Rank	Nation	Gold	Silver	Bronze	Total
1	Brazil	9	15	11	35
2	Venezuela	8	5	7	20
3	Chile	6	3	7	16
4	Colombia	5	3	3	11
5	Argentina	4	8	6	18
6	Peru	3	3	3	9
7	Paraguay	1	0	0	1
7	Uruguay	1	0	0	1
Totals (8 entries)		37	37	37	111

== Participating nations ==
- Argentina (47)
- Brazil (44)
- Chile (57)
- Colombia (12)
- Paraguay (8)
- Peru (15)
- Uruguay (12)
- Venezuela (34)
