= Athletics at the 1971 Pan American Games – Men's 200 metres =

Men's 200 metres at the Pan American Games

The men's 200 metres event at the 1971 Pan American Games was held in Cali on 2 and 3 August.

== Medalists ==
Gold	Silver	Bronze
Don Quarrie; Jamaica	Marshall Dill; United States	Edwin Roberts; Trinidad and Tobago

== Results ==
=== Heats ===
Held on 2 August

Wind:
Heat 1: 0.0 m/s, Heat 2: 0.0 m/s, Heat 3: 0.0 m/s, Heat 4: 0.0 m/s

Rank	Heat	Name	Nationality	Time	Notes
1	1	Willie Deckard	United States	20.88	Q
2	4	Edwin Roberts	Trinidad and Tobago	20.91	Q
3	3	Marshall Dill	United States	20.95	Q
4	2	Don Quarrie	Jamaica	21.08	Q
4	4	Fernando Acevedo	Peru	21.08	Q
6	3	Guillermo González	Puerto Rico	21.22	Q
7	3	Trevor James	Trinidad and Tobago	21.34	Q
8	4	Carl Lawson	Jamaica	21.35	Q
9	4	Charlie Francis	Canada	21.42	Q
10	2	Andrés Calonge	Argentina	21.44	Q
11	2	Alberto Marchán	Venezuela	21.48	Q
12	3	Craig Blackman	Canada	21.62	Q
13	2	Pedro Grajales	Colombia	21.67	Q
14	3	Kevin Johnson	Bahamas	21.70	
15	3	Jorge Matias	Brazil	21.89	
16	1	Luís da Silva	Brazil	21.93	Q
16	2	Enrique Almarante	Dominican Republic	21.93	
18	4	Roberto Hoger	Argentina	21.96	
19	1	Walter Callander	Bahamas	22.16	Q
20	1	Julio Meade	Dominican Republic	22.17	Q
21	4	Santiago Antonetti	Puerto Rico	22.22	
22	2	Carlos Abbott	Costa Rica	22.23	
23	3	Julio Martinich	Peru	22.25	
24	1	Jesús Rico	Venezuela	22.26	
25	1	Junior Trotman	Barbados	22.44	
26	1	Carmelo Reyes	Mexico	22.64	

=== Semifinals ===
Held on 3 August

Wind:
Heat 1: +3.1 m/s, Heat 2: +2.2 m/s

Rank	Heat	Name	Nationality	Time	Notes
1	2	Marshall Dill	United States	20.34	Q, GR
2	1	Don Quarrie	Jamaica	20.64	Q
3	1	Willie Deckard	United States	20.66	Q
4	2	Edwin Roberts	Trinidad and Tobago	20.71	Q
5	2	Fernando Acevedo	Peru	20.87	Q
6	2	Carl Lawson	Jamaica	20.94	Q
7	1	Guillermo González	Puerto Rico	21.16	Q
8	2	Charlie Francis	Canada	21.22	
9	1	Andrés Calonge	Argentina	21.27	Q
10	1	Alberto Marchán	Venezuela	21.39	
11	2	Luís da Silva	Brazil	21.46	
12	1	Trevor James	Trinidad and Tobago	21.48	
13	2	Pedro Grajales	Colombia	21.58	
14	1	Craig Blackman	Canada	21.62	
15	1	Walter Callander	Bahamas	21.75	
	2	Julio Meade	Dominican Republic	DNS	

=== Final ===
Held on 3 August

Wind: +1.0 m/s

Rank	Name	Nationality	Time	Notes
1st place, gold medalist(s)	Don Quarrie	Jamaica	19.86	GR
2nd place, silver medalist(s)	Marshall Dill	United States	20.39	
3rd place, bronze medalist(s)	Edwin Roberts	Trinidad and Tobago	20.39	
4	Fernando Acevedo	Peru	20.69	
5	Carl Lawson	Jamaica	20.98	
6	Guillermo González	Puerto Rico	21.12	
7	Andrés Calonge	Argentina	21.13	
	Willie Deckard	United States	DNF	
