= Athletics at the 1971 Pan American Games – Women's 100 metres =

Women's 100 metres at the Pan American Games

The women's 100 metres event at the 1971 Pan American Games was held in Cali on 2 and 3 August.

== Medalists ==
Gold	Silver	Bronze
Iris Davis; United States	Stephanie Berto; Canada	Silvia Chivás; Cuba

== Results ==
=== Heats ===
Held on 2 August

Wind:
Heat 1: +3.8 m/s, Heat 2: +4.4 m/s, Heat 3: +1.8 m/s

Rank	Heat	Name	Nationality	Time	Notes
1	1	Iris Davis	United States	11.23	Q
2	1	Silvia Chivás	Cuba	11.39	Q
3	2	Orien Brown	United States	11.48	Q
4	1	Stephanie Berto	Canada	11.52	Q
4	2	Fulgencia Romay	Cuba	11.52	Q
6	2	Rose Allwood	Jamaica	11.53	Q
7	2	Silvina Pereira da Silva	Brazil	11.56	Q
8	3	Juana Mosquera	Colombia	11.60	Q
9	2	Joan Porter	Trinidad and Tobago	11.79	Q
10	1	Irene Fitzner	Argentina	11.94	Q
11	3	María Luisa Vilca	Peru	11.95	Q
12	2	Claudette Powell	Bahamas	12.01	q
12	3	Diva Bishop	Panama	12.01	Q
14	3	Joyce Veira	Suriname	12.09	Q
15	2	Sandra Johnson	Costa Rica	12.10	
16	1	Edith Noeding	Peru	12.25	Q
17	2	Zulay Montaño	Venezuela	12.30	
18	3	Beatriz Allocco	Argentina	12.53	Q
19	1	Adriana Marchena	Venezuela	12.62	
20	1	Aida Ortiz	Colombia	12.64	
21	3	Mayra Figueroa	Guatemala	13.67	
	3	Patty Loverock	Canada	DNF	
	3	Josefa Vicent	Uruguay	DNS	

=== Semifinals ===
Held on 3 August

Wind:
Heat 1: +2.7 m/s, Heat 2: +3.8 m/s

Rank	Heat	Name	Nationality	Time	Notes
1	1	Iris Davis	United States	11.29	Q
2	2	Silvia Chivás	Cuba	11.43	Q
3	2	Orien Brown	United States	11.52	Q
4	1	Stephanie Berto	Canada	11.55	Q
5	2	Rose Allwood	Jamaica	11.60	Q
6	1	Juana Mosquera	Colombia	11.64	Q
7	1	Silvina Pereira da Silva	Brazil	11.71	Q
8	2	María Luisa Vilca	Peru	11.98	Q
9	2	Irene Fitzner	Argentina	12.02	
10	2	Joyce Veira	Suriname	12.03	
11	2	Joan Porter	Trinidad and Tobago	12.06	
12	1	Diva Bishop	Panama	12.14	
13	1	Edith Noeding	Peru	12.40	
14	1	Beatriz Allocco	Argentina	12.40	
	1	Fulgencia Romay	Cuba	DNS	
	2	Claudette Powell	Bahamas	DNS	

=== Final ===
Held on 3 August

Wind: +3.0 m/s

Rank	Name	Nationality	Time	Notes
1st place, gold medalist(s)	Iris Davis	United States	11.25	
2nd place, silver medalist(s)	Stephanie Berto	Canada	11.40	
3rd place, bronze medalist(s)	Silvia Chivás	Cuba	11.47	
4	Orien Brown	United States	11.49	
5	Juana Mosquera	Colombia	11.49	
6	Rose Allwood	Jamaica	11.65	
7	María Luisa Vilca	Peru	11.99	
	Silvina Pereira da Silva	Brazil	DNS	
