= Athletics at the 1979 Pan American Games – Men's high jump =

Men's high jump at the 1979 Pan American Games
- Venue: Estadio Sixto Escobar
- Dates: 11 July
- Winning height: 2.26

Medalists
Gold medal	Franklin Jacobs	United States
Silver medal	Benn Fields	United States
Bronze medal	Milton Ottey	Canada

The men's high jump competition of the athletics events at the 1979 Pan American Games took place on 11 July at the Estadio Sixto Escobar. The defending Pan American Games champion was Tom Woods of the United States.

== Records ==
Prior to this competition, the existing world and Pan American Games records were as follows:

World record	Vladimir Yashchenko (URS)	2.34	Tbilisi, Soviet Union	June 16, 1978
Pan American Games record	Tom Woods (USA)	2.25	Mexico City, Mexico	1975

== Results ==
All heights shown are in meters.

KEY:	WR	World Record	GR	Pan American Record

=== Qualification ===
Qualifying perf. 2.00 (Q) or 12 best performers (q) advanced to the Final.

Rank	Athlete	Nationality	Result	Notes
1	Franklin Jacobs	United States	2.00	Q
1	Benn Fields	United States	2.00	Q
1	Milton Ottey	Canada	2.00	Q
1	Francisco Centelles	Cuba	2.00	Q
1	Dean Bauck	Canada	2.00	Q
1	Cristóbal de León	Dominican Republic	2.00	Q
1	Richard Spencer	Cuba	2.00	Q
1	Daniel Mamet	Argentina	2.00	Q
1	Rodolfo Madrigal	Costa Rica	2.00	Q
10	Carlos Acosta	Puerto Rico	1.95	q
10	Luis Barrionuevo	Argentina	1.95	q
10	Félix Carrero	Puerto Rico	1.95	q
	Adolfo Marín	Paraguay	NM	
	Desmond Morris	Jamaica	DNS	

=== Final ===
Rank	Name	Nationality	Height	Notes
1st place, gold medalist(s)	Franklin Jacobs	United States	2.26	GR
2nd place, silver medalist(s)	Benn Fields	United States	2.19	
3rd place, bronze medalist(s)	Milton Ottey	Canada	2.19	
4	Francisco Centelles	Cuba	2.17	
5	Dean Bauck	Canada	2.15	
6	Carlos Acosta	Puerto Rico	2.15	
7	Cristóbal de León	Dominican Republic	2.12	
8	Richard Spencer	Cuba	2.09	
9	Daniel Mamet	Argentina	2.09	
10	Luis Barrionuevo	Argentina	2.06	
11	Rodolfo Madrigal	Costa Rica	2.06	
12	Félix Carrero	Puerto Rico	2.00	
