= Athletics at the 1971 Pan American Games – Men's 4 × 100 metres relay =

Men's 4 × 100 metres relay at the Pan American Games

The men's 4 × 100 metres relay event at the 1971 Pan American Games was held in Cali on 4 and 5 August.

== Medallists ==
Gold	Silver	Bronze
Jamaica; Alfred Daley; Don Quarrie; Carl Lawson; Lennox Miller	Cuba; Pablo Montes; Hermes Ramírez; Juan Morales; Bárbaro Bandomo	United States; Rod Milburn; Willie Deckard; Marshall Dill; Ron Draper

== Results ==
=== Heats ===
Rank	Heat	Nation	Athletes	Time	Notes
1	2	United States	Willie Deckard, Marshall Dill, Ron Draper, Rod Milburn	39.47	Q
2	1	Jamaica	Alfred Daley, Carl Lawson, Lennox Miller, Don Quarrie	39.60	Q
3	1	Cuba	Bárbaro Bandomo, Pablo Montes, Juan Morales, Hermes Ramírez	39.68	Q
4	2	Puerto Rico	Santiago Antonetti, Arnaldo Bristol, Guillermo González, Jorge Vizcarrondo	40.75	Q
5	1	Venezuela	Félix Mata, Alberto Marchán, Jesús Rico, Orlando Cubillán	40.83	Q
6	1	Peru	Fernando Acevedo, Jorge Alemán, Augusto Machinares, Julio Chia	40.85	Q
7	2	Argentina	Pedro Bassart, Juan Carlos Dyrzka, Roberto Hoger, Andrés Calonge	40.92	Q
8	2	Bahamas	Walter Callander, Kevin Johnson, Tim Barrett, Mike Sands	41.00	Q
9	2	Colombia	Arquímedes Mina, Julio Escobar, Pedro Grajales, Jimmy Sierra	41.17	
	1	Trinidad and Tobago	Raymond Fabien, Rudy Reid, Trevor James, Edwin Roberts	DQ	

=== Final ===
Rank	Nation	Athletes	Time	Notes
1st place, gold medalist(s)	Jamaica	Alfred Daley, Carl Lawson, Lennox Miller, Don Quarrie	39.28	
2nd place, silver medalist(s)	Cuba	Bárbaro Bandomo, Pablo Montes, Juan Morales, Hermes Ramírez	39.84	
3rd place, bronze medalist(s)	United States	Willie Deckard, Marshall Dill, Ron Draper, Rod Milburn	39.84	
4	Puerto Rico	Santiago Antonetti, Arnaldo Bristol, Guillermo González, Jorge Vizcarrondo	40.46	
5	Venezuela	Félix Mata, Alberto Marchán, Jesús Rico, Orlando Cubillán	40.53	
6	Bahamas	Walter Callander, Kevin Johnson, Tim Barrett, Mike Sands	40.92	
7	Peru	Jorge Alemán, Fernando Acevedo, Augusto Machinares, Julio Chia	41.10	
8	Argentina	Pedro Bassart, Juan Carlos Dyrzka, Roberto Hoger, Andrés Calonge	41.50	
