= Athletics at the 1971 Pan American Games – Men's 100 metres =

Men's 100 metres at the Pan American Games

The men's 100 metres event at the 1971 Pan American Games was held in Cali on 31 July and 1 August.

== Medalists ==
Gold	Silver	Bronze
Don Quarrie; Jamaica	Lennox Miller; Jamaica	Delano Meriwether; United States

== Results ==
=== Heats ===
Held on 31 July

Wind:
Heat 1: +2.2 m/s, Heat 2: +1.9 m/s, Heat 3: +2.3 m/s, Heat 4: +2.5 m/s

Rank	Heat	Name	Nationality	Time	Notes
1	3	Don Quarrie	Jamaica	10.14	Q
2	4	Lennox Miller	Jamaica	10.30	Q
3	1	Pablo Montes	Cuba	10.33	Q
4	3	Hermes Ramírez	Cuba	10.34	Q
5	3	Mike Sands	Bahamas	10.44	Q
5	4	Charlie Francis	Canada	10.44	Q
7	1	Delano Meriwether	United States	10.46	Q
7	4	Luís da Silva	Brazil	10.46	Q
9	2	Jim Green	United States	10.51	Q
10	1	Félix Mata	Venezuela	10.53	Q
11	1	Pedro Bassart	Argentina	10.57	Q
12	3	Santiago Antonetti	Puerto Rico	10.58	Q
13	2	Julio Meade	Dominican Republic	10.59	Q
13	4	Andrés Calonge	Argentina	10.59	Q
15	3	Alberto Marchán	Venezuela	10.60	
16	4	Arquimedes Mina	Colombia	10.61	
17	2	Kevin Johnson	Bahamas	10.64	Q
18	1	Jimmy Sierra	Colombia	10.66	
18	3	Jorge Matias	Brazil	10.66	
20	3	Julio Chia	Peru	10.72	
21	3	Rudy Reid	Trinidad and Tobago	10.73	
22	4	Félix López	Dominican Republic	10.79	
23	2	Junior Trotman	Barbados	10.85	Q
24	2	Ronald Russell	Virgin Islands	10.85	
25	4	Raymond Fabien	Trinidad and Tobago	10.86	
26	1	Carlos Abbott	Costa Rica	10.98	
27	2	Julio Martinich	Peru	11.02	
28	1	Salomón Rowe	Guatemala	12.31	

=== Semifinals ===
Held on 31 July

Wind:
Heat 1: +4.2 m/s, Heat 2: +0.9 m/s

Rank	Heat	Name	Nationality	Time	Notes
1	2	Lennox Miller	Jamaica	10.19	Q
2	1	Don Quarrie	Jamaica	10.23	Q
3	2	Pablo Montes	Cuba	10.27	Q
4	1	Hermes Ramírez	Cuba	10.32	Q
5	1	Delano Meriwether	United States	10.35	Q
6	1	Charlie Francis	Canada	10.36	Q
7	1	Mike Sands	Bahamas	10.51	
8	1	Junior Trotman	Barbados	10.56	
9	2	Luís da Silva	Brazil	10.57	Q
10	2	Jim Green	United States	10.61	Q
11	2	Andrés Calonge	Argentina	10.67	
12	1	Pedro Bassart	Argentina	10.69	
13	2	Julio Meade	Dominican Republic	10.70	
14	2	Kevin Johnson	Bahamas	10.74	
15	2	Santiago Antonetti	Puerto Rico	10.78	
16	1	Félix Mata	Venezuela	10.98	

=== Final ===
Held on 1 August

Wind: 0.0 m/s

Rank	Name	Nationality	Time	Notes
1st place, gold medalist(s)	Don Quarrie	Jamaica	10.29	
2nd place, silver medalist(s)	Lennox Miller	Jamaica	10.32	
3rd place, bronze medalist(s)	Delano Meriwether	United States	10.34	
4	Pablo Montes	Cuba	10.40	
5	Hermes Ramírez	Cuba	10.44	
6	Charlie Francis	Canada	10.54	
7	Luís da Silva	Brazil	10.60	
	Jim Green	United States	DNS	
