= 1971 South American Championships in Athletics – Results =

These are the results of the 1971 South American Championships in Athletics which took place at the Estadio Nacional in Lima, Peru, between 9 and 17 October.

== Men's results ==
=== 100 metres ===
Heats – 9 October

Rank	Heat	Name	Nationality	Time	Notes
1	1	Félix Mata	Venezuela	10.4	Q
2	1	Pedro Bassart	Argentina	10.4	Q
3	1	Fernando Acevedo	Peru	10.6	
4	1	Jean Pierre Landon	Chile	10.8	
5	1	Angel Guerreros	Paraguay	11.1	
1	2	Julio Chia	Peru	10.7	Q
2	2	Jorge Mathias	Brazil	10.7	Q
3	2	Humberto Galea	Venezuela	10.9	
4	2	Juan Rodolfo Rieder	Paraguay	10.9	
1	3	Luís da Silva	Brazil	10.8	Q
2	3	José Pérez Ferreria	Argentina	11.1	Q
3	3	Alejandro Kapsch	Chile	11.2	

Final – 10 October

Rank	Lane	Name	Nationality	Time	Notes
1st place, gold medalist(s)	1	Félix Mata	Venezuela	10.6	
2nd place, silver medalist(s)	6	Pedro Bassart	Argentina	10.7	
3rd place, bronze medalist(s)	5	Luís da Silva	Brazil	10.8	
4	4	Jorge Mathias	Brazil	10.9	
5	3	Julio Chia	Peru	11.0	
6	2	José Pérez Ferreria	Argentina	11.2	

=== 200 metres ===
Heats – 12 October

Rank	Heat	Name	Nationality	Time	Notes
1	1	Fernando Acevedo	Peru	21.5	Q
2	1	Pedro Bassart	Argentina	21.9	Q
3	1	Jorge Mathias	Brazil	22.1	
4	1	Jean Pierre Landon	Chile	23.0	
1	2	Luís da Silva	Brazil	21.8	Q
2	2	Alberto Marchán	Venezuela	21.8	Q
3	2	José Pérez Ferreria	Argentina	22.1	
4	2	Angel Guerreros	Paraguay	23.1	
1	3	Julio Chia	Peru	22.3	Q
2	3	Segundo Guerra	Venezuela	22.4	Q
3	3	Marcelo Moreno	Chile	22.6	
4	3	Juan Rodolfo Rieder	Paraguay	22.9	

Final – 13 October

Rank	Name	Nationality	Time	Notes
1st place, gold medalist(s)	Fernando Acevedo	Peru	21.2	
2nd place, silver medalist(s)	Pedro Bassart	Argentina	21.8	
3rd place, bronze medalist(s)	Alberto Marchán	Venezuela	21.9	
4	Julio Chia	Peru	22.1	
5	Luís da Silva	Brazil	22.1	
6	Segundo Guerra	Venezuela	22.2	

=== 400 metres ===
Heats – 9 October

Rank	Heat	Name	Nationality	Time	Notes
1	1	Héctor Honores	Peru	49.5	Q
2	1	João Francisco	Brazil	50.2	Q
3	1	Roberto Erazo	Ecuador	50.9	
4	1	C. León	Paraguay	53.4	
1	2	Fernando Acevedo	Peru	48.3	Q
2	2	Eric Phillips	Venezuela	49.2	Q
3	2	Carlos Intaschi	Argentina	49.5	
4	2	Claudio Muñoz	Chile	49.9	
1	3	Raúl Dome-Sanhouse	Venezuela	48.6	Q
2	3	José Rabaça	Brazil	48.9	Q
3	3	Francisco Rojas Soto	Paraguay	49.1	
4	3	Carlos Heuchert	Argentina	49.7	

Final – 10 October

Rank	Lane	Name	Nationality	Time	Notes
1st place, gold medalist(s)	5	Fernando Acevedo	Peru	46.4	=CR
2nd place, silver medalist(s)	3	João Francisco	Brazil	47.9	
3rd place, bronze medalist(s)	6	José Rabaça	Brazil	48.0	
4	2	Raúl Dome-Sanhouse	Venezuela	48.5	
5	1	Eric Phillips	Venezuela	48.6	
6	4	Héctor Honores	Peru	49.7	

=== 800 metres ===
Heats – 9 October

Rank	Heat	Name	Nationality	Time	Notes
1	1	Fernando Sotomayor	Chile	1:53.3	Q
2	1	Atílio Alegre	Brazil	1:53.7	Q
2	1	Alberto Gajate	Argentina	1:56.2	
4	1	Jorge Vallecilla	Ecuador	1:59.7	
5	1	Óscar Tami	Paraguay	2:15.3	
1	2	Carlos Dalurzo	Argentina	1:56.5	Q
2	2	Roberto Salmona	Chile	1:56.7	Q
3	2	João de Oliveira	Brazil	1:58.1	
4	2	Jorge Alemán	Peru	1:58.4	
1	3	Rómulo Carreño	Venezuela	1:57.4	Q
2	3	Homero Muñoz	Ecuador	1:58.1	Q
3	3	Eduardo Ojeda	Peru	1:59.9	

Final – 12 October

Rank	Name	Nationality	Time	Notes
1st place, gold medalist(s)	Carlos Dalurzo	Argentina	1:50.9	
2nd place, silver medalist(s)	Roberto Salmona	Chile	1:51.6	
3rd place, bronze medalist(s)	Fernando Sotomayor	Chile	1:51.6	
4	Rómulo Carreño	Venezuela	1:52.4	
5	Atílio Alegre	Brazil	1:52.5	
6	Homero Muñoz	Ecuador	1:55.0	

=== 1500 metres ===
16 October

Rank	Name	Nationality	Time	Notes
1st place, gold medalist(s)	Víctor Ríos	Chile	3:48.6	
2nd place, silver medalist(s)	Roberto Salmona	Chile	3:48.9	
3rd place, bronze medalist(s)	Atílio Alegre	Brazil	3:49.5	
4	João de Oliveira	Brazil	3:55.2	
5	Abel Córdoba	Argentina	3:56.9	
6	Leandro Espínola	Argentina	3:57.2	

=== 5000 metres ===
10 October

Rank	Name	Nationality	Time	Notes
1st place, gold medalist(s)	Edmundo Warnke	Chile	14:07.6	CR
2nd place, silver medalist(s)	Víctor Mora	Colombia	14:08.8	
3rd place, bronze medalist(s)	Domingo Tibaduiza	Colombia	14:15.4	
4	Víctor Ríos	Chile	14:43.2	
5	Paulo Yamaguchi	Brazil	14:44.6	
6	Carlos Alves	Brazil	14:52.2	

=== 10,000 metres ===
12 October

Rank	Name	Nationality	Time	Notes
1st place, gold medalist(s)	Edmundo Warnke	Chile	29:14.6	CR
2nd place, silver medalist(s)	Víctor Mora	Colombia	29:17.6	
3rd place, bronze medalist(s)	Domingo Tibaduiza	Colombia	29:24.8	
4	Carlos Alves	Brazil	30:43.7	
5	Luiz Caetano	Brazil	30:57.8	
6	Ceres Bertochi	Uruguay	31:11.4	
7	Luis Castro	Ecuador	31:11.4	
8	Carlos Agüero-Girón	Argentina	NT	

=== Marathon ===
17 October

Rank	Name	Nationality	Time	Notes
1st place, gold medalist(s)	Martín Pavón	Colombia	2:26:11	CR
2nd place, silver medalist(s)	Hernán Barreneche	Colombia	2:32:20	
3rd place, bronze medalist(s)	Edmundo Warnke	Chile	2:34:31	
4	Mario Valdivia	Chile	2:36:54	
5	Orides Alves	Brazil	2:36:54	
6	Juan Fernando Molina	Argentina	2:42:00	
7	Luiz Caetano	Brazil	2:43:51	
8	Alejandro Flores	Ecuador	2:46:27	
9	Norbertino Etchechury	Uruguay	2:55:56	
10	F. Utreras	Ecuador	2:56:51	
11	Mario Cutropia	Argentina	3:02:26	
12	P. Horna	Peru	3:06:41	
13	M. Palomino	Peru	3:12:53	

=== 110 metres hurdles ===
Heats – 16 October

Rank	Heat	Name	Nationality	Time	Notes
1	1	Patricio Saavedra	Chile	14.9	Q
2	1	Alfredo Deza	Peru	14.9	Q
3	1	Francisco Rossetto	Argentina	15.4	Q
4	1	Francisco Rojas Soto	Paraguay	15.9	
5	1	Barnabé Souza	Brazil	16.2	
1	2	Enrique Rendón	Venezuela	14.8	Q
2	2	Márcio Lomónaco	Brazil	14.9	Q
3	2	Alfredo Guzmán	Chile	15.2	Q
4	2	Roberto González	Peru	15.8	
5	2	Juan Carlos Dyrzka	Argentina	15.8	
6	2	Bienvenido Sosa	Paraguay	18.3	

Final – 17 October

Rank	Name	Nationality	Time	Notes
1st place, gold medalist(s)	Enrique Rendón	Venezuela	14.8	
2nd place, silver medalist(s)	Alfredo Deza	Peru	14.8	
3rd place, bronze medalist(s)	Patricio Saavedra	Chile	14.8	
4	Márcio Lomónaco	Brazil	15.0	
5	Alfredo Guzmán	Chile	15.3	
6	Francisco Rossetto	Argentina	15.4	

=== 400 metres hurdles ===
Heats – 12 October

Rank	Heat	Name	Nationality	Time	Notes
1	1	Juan Carlos Dyrzka	Argentina	52.6	Q
2	1	Dorival Negrisoli	Brazil	53.4	Q
3	1	Francisco Rojas Soto	Paraguay	54.4	Q
4	1	Alfredo Guzmán	Chile	55.1	
5	1	Jorge Vallecilla	Ecuador	56.3	
6	1	Julio Gómez	Peru	57.9	
1	2	Eduardo Rodrigues	Brazil	54.1	Q
2	2	Rubén Paulo	Argentina	54.6	Q
3	2	Rómulo Carreño	Venezuela	54.8	Q
4	2	Juan Santiago Gordón	Chile	55.0	
5	2	Luis Pérez	Peru	57.4	
6	2	Aníbal Ruiz	Paraguay	1:04.9	

Final – 13 October

Rank	Name	Nationality	Time	Notes
1st place, gold medalist(s)	Juan Carlos Dyrzka	Argentina	52.4	
2nd place, silver medalist(s)	Dorival Negrisoli	Brazil	53.0	
3rd place, bronze medalist(s)	Eduardo Rodrigues	Brazil	53.2	
4	Rubén Paulo	Argentina	53.5	
5	Rómulo Carreño	Venezuela	54.3	
6	Francisco Rojas Soto	Paraguay	54.4	

=== 3000 metres steeplechase ===
17 October

Rank	Name	Nationality	Time	Notes
1st place, gold medalist(s)	Víctor Mora	Colombia	9:03.8	
2nd place, silver medalist(s)	Francisco Vega	Peru	9:17.8	
3rd place, bronze medalist(s)	Fernando Sotomayor	Chile	9:19.6	
4	Abel Córdoba	Argentina	9:22.8	
5	Ricardo Montero	Chile	9:24.8	
6	Albertino Etchechury	Uruguay	9:25.2	

=== 4 × 100 metres relay ===
17 October

Rank	Nation	Competitors	Time	Notes
1st place, gold medalist(s)	Brazil	Luiz Anunciação, Luís da Silva, Jorge Mathias, João Francisco	40.7	
2nd place, silver medalist(s)	Venezuela	Orlando Cubillán, Félix Mata, Alberto Marchán, Segundo Guerra	40.9	
3rd place, bronze medalist(s)	Peru	Andrés Pérez, Julio Chia, Velit, Fernando Acevedo	41.2	
4	Argentina	Rubén Paulo, Francisco Rosseto, Eduardo Satoyama, Pedro Bassart	42.3	
5	Chile	Jean Pierre Landon, Claudio Muñoz, Alejandro Kapsch, Marcelo Moreno	42.5	
6	Paraguay	Angel Guerreros, C. León, Francisco Rojas Soto, Juan Rodolfo Rieder	42.9	

=== 4 × 400 metres relay ===
16 October

Rank	Nation	Competitors	Time	Notes
1st place, gold medalist(s)	Venezuela	Segundo Guerra, Alberto Marchán, Erick Phillips, Raúl Dome-Sanhouse	3:14.8	
2nd place, silver medalist(s)	Argentina	Carlos Intaschi, Carlos Dalurzo, Juan Carlos Dyrzka, Alberto Gajate	3:15.8	
3rd place, bronze medalist(s)	Brazil	Jorge Mathias, José Rabaça, Dorival Negrisoli, João Francisco	3:16.1	
4	Peru	Héctor Honores, Jorge Alemán, Eduardo Ojeda, Fernando Acevedo	3:16.4	
5	Chile	Juan Santiago Gordón, Roberto Salmona, Fernando Sotomayor, Claudio Muñoz	3:25.4	
6	Paraguay	Angel Guerreros, C. León, Óscar Tami, Francisco Rojas Soto	3:35.5	

=== High jump ===
17 October

Rank	Name	Nationality	Result	Notes
1st place, gold medalist(s)	Luis Barrionuevo	Argentina	2.05	CR
2nd place, silver medalist(s)	Roberto Abugattas	Peru	2.05	CR
3rd place, bronze medalist(s)	José Dalmastro	Argentina	2.00	
4	Hermes Cabal	Colombia	1.95	
5	Luis Arbulú	Peru	1.95	
6	Óscar Rodríguez	Chile	1.90	
7	Jaime Pautt	Colombia	1.85	

=== Pole vault ===
16 October

Rank	Name	Nationality	Result	Notes
1st place, gold medalist(s)	Erico Barney	Argentina	4.50	CR
2nd place, silver medalist(s)	Fernando Hoces	Chile	4.20	
3rd place, bronze medalist(s)	Armando Chiamulera	Brazil	4.20	
4	Luis Mejía	Peru	4.00	
5	Timoteo Buckwalter	Argentina	4.00	
6	Augusto Piqueras	Peru	3.80	
7	Sérgio Rodrigues	Brazil	3.50	

=== Long jump ===
10 October

Rank	Name	Nationality	Result	Notes
1st place, gold medalist(s)	Miguel Zapata	Colombia	7.41	
2nd place, silver medalist(s)	Luiz de Souza	Brazil	7.34	
3rd place, bronze medalist(s)	Eduardo Labalta	Argentina	7.30	
4	Nelson Prudêncio	Brazil	7.19	
5	Alejandro Kapsch	Chile	7.08	
6	Manuel Gutiérrez	Colombia	6.93	
7	Emilio Mazzeo	Argentina	6.82	
8	Hugo Núñez	Ecuador	6.73	

=== Triple jump ===
9 October

Rank	Name	Nationality	Result	Notes
1st place, gold medalist(s)	Nelson Prudêncio	Brazil	15.58	
2nd place, silver medalist(s)	Manuel Gutiérrez	Colombia	14.94	
3rd place, bronze medalist(s)	Roberto dos Santos	Uruguay	14.75	
4	Luiz de Souza	Brazil	14.66	
5	Jaime Pautt	Colombia	14.47	
6	Emilio Mazzeo	Argentina	14.18	
7	Francisco Pichott	Chile	14.14	
8	Angel Gagliano	Argentina	13.55	

=== Shot put ===
9 October

Rank	Name	Nationality	Result	Notes
1st place, gold medalist(s)	José Carlos Jacques	Brazil	16.85	
2nd place, silver medalist(s)	Juan Adolfo Turri	Argentina	15.73	
3rd place, bronze medalist(s)	Mario Peretti	Argentina	15.63	
4	Darwin Piñeyrúa	Uruguay	14.89	
5	Euripedes Pereira	Brazil	14.87	
6	Jorge Quiñones	Peru	13.49	
7	Armando Pugliesi	Peru	12.95	
8	César Garcete	Paraguay	11.91	

=== Discus throw ===
10 October

Rank	Name	Nationality	Result	Notes
1st place, gold medalist(s)	Sérgio Thomé	Brazil	53.82	
2nd place, silver medalist(s)	José Carlos Jacques	Brazil	53.14	
3rd place, bronze medalist(s)	Gustavo Gutiérrez	Colombia	47.78	
4	José Alberto Vallejo	Argentina	45.14	
5	Hernán Haddad	Chile	44.68	
6	Mario Peretti	Argentina	43.82	

=== Hammer throw ===
16 October

Rank	Name	Nationality	Result	Notes
1st place, gold medalist(s)	José Alberto Vallejo	Argentina	62.82	CR
2nd place, silver medalist(s)	Darwin Piñeyrúa	Uruguay	61.36	
3rd place, bronze medalist(s)	Celso de Moraes	Brazil	57.74	
4	Alberto Corvatta	Argentina	52.74	
5	Clovis da Silva	Brazil	52.34	
6	Carlos Mencheli	Peru	47.40	
7	Tulio Tebaldi	Peru	44.88	

=== Javelin throw ===
17 October – Old model

Rank	Name	Nationality	Result	Notes
1st place, gold medalist(s)	Paulo de Faria	Brazil	69.68	
2nd place, silver medalist(s)	Gustavo Gutiérrez	Colombia	65.90	
3rd place, bronze medalist(s)	Jorge Peña	Chile	64.72	
4	Dante Yorges	Peru	62.68	
5	Eduardo Orellana	Chile	60.96	
6	Ricardo Héber	Argentina	59.34	

=== Decathlon ===
12–13 October – 1962 tables (1985 conversions given with *)

The highest mark recorded in each event is highlighted in yellow

Rank	Athlete	Nationality	100m	LJ	SP	HJ	400m	110m H	DT	PV	JT	1500m	Points	Conv.	Notes
1st place, gold medalist(s)	Héctor Thomas	Venezuela	11.2	6.81	14.62	1.75	53.8	16.0	42.46	4.10	59.64	5:17.2	6974	6790*	
2nd place, silver medalist(s)	Ramón Montezuma	Venezuela	11.4	6.05	12.04	1.75	49.8	15.6	38.50	3.10	54.08	4:28.6	6662	6790*	
3rd place, bronze medalist(s)	Emilio Mazzeo	Argentina	11.6	6.97	12.86	1.93	52.9	16.2	33.28	3.20	49.66	4:36.0	6656	6478*	
4	Sérgio Rodrigues	Brazil	11.7	6.35	12.99	1.75	53.6	16.9	37.20	3.60	54.80	5:01.4	6371	6176*	
5	Alfredo Silva	Chile	11.6	6.64	10.97	1.90	52.7	16.4	32.38	3.10	40.46	4:32.7	6265	6088*	
6	Néstor Villegas	Colombia	11.6	6.26	12.37	1.75	51.4	16.6	39.68	2.90	42.78	4:53.3	6178	6000*	
7	Barnabé Souza	Brazil	11.4	6.27	11.27	1.65	52.0	15.8	29.92	3.20	41.66	4:43.2	6049	5877*	
8	Adalberto Morales	Argentina	12.1	6.12	12.18	1.75	54.4	16.9	36.90	3.00	46.00	4:49.1	5928	5741*	
9	Jorge Rissi	Peru	11.3	6.19	10.91	1.75	53.3	17.9	33.00	2.90	42.02	5:05.0	5736	5490*	
10	Miguel Villacres	Ecuador	11.1	6.26	10.32	1.65	51.3	19.4	33.48	NM	43.98	4:43.3	5710	5281*	
11	Adolfo Zúñiga	Peru	12.5	5.64	11.04	1.75	60.0	22.0	37.00	2.70	49.08	5:17.7	4945	4685*	
12	César Garcete	Paraguay	12.2	5.91	11.15	1.60	59.9	19.9	32.22	2.70	44.78	5:46.6	4739	4530*	

== Women's results ==
=== 100 metres ===
Heats – 12 October

Rank	Heat	Name	Nationality	Time	Notes
1	1	María Luisa Vilca	Peru	12.1	Q
2	1	Liliana Cragno	Argentina	12.3	Q
3	1	Paz Gallo	Chile	12.6	Q
4	1	Alicia Gogluska	Uruguay	12.7	
5	1	Sueli Vizintas	Brazil	12.8	
1	2	Josefa Vicent	Uruguay	12.2	Q
2	2	Irene Fitzner	Argentina	12.3	Q
3	2	Silvia Kinzel	Chile	12.6	Q
4	2	Carmela Bolívar	Peru	12.6	
5	2	Cristina Nagy	Brazil	12.8	

Final – 13 October

Rank	Name	Nationality	Time	Notes
1st place, gold medalist(s)	María Luisa Vilca	Peru	12.0	
2nd place, silver medalist(s)	Irene Fitzner	Argentina	12.3	
3rd place, bronze medalist(s)	Josefa Vicent	Uruguay	12.3	
4	Liliana Cragno	Argentina	12.4	
5	Silvia Kinzel	Chile	12.7	
6	Paz Gallo	Chile	12.7	

=== 200 metres ===
Heats – 9 October

Rank	Heat	Name	Nationality	Time	Notes
1	1	María Luisa Vilca	Peru	24.4	Q
2	1	Angela Godoy	Argentina	24.8	Q
3	1	Paz Gallo	Chile	25.8	
4	1	Alicia Gogluska	Uruguay	26.1	
1	2	Josefa Vicent	Uruguay	24.6	Q
2	2	Elsy Rivas	Colombia	25.0	Q
3	2	Conceicao Geremias	Brazil	25.9	
1	3	Beatriz Allocco	Argentina	25.3	Q
2	3	Carmela Bolívar	Peru	25.6	Q
3	3	Aida dos Santos	Brazil	25.7	
4	3	Aurora Sáenz	Chile	26.5	

Final – 10 October

Rank	Lane	Name	Nationality	Time	Notes
1st place, gold medalist(s)	3	Josefa Vicent	Uruguay	24.4	
2nd place, silver medalist(s)	6	Elsy Rivas	Colombia	24.5	
3rd place, bronze medalist(s)	5	Angela Godoy	Argentina	24.6	
4	2	María Luisa Vilca	Peru	24.6	
5	1	Beatriz Allocco	Argentina	25.4	
6	4	Carmela Bolívar	Peru	26.3	

=== 400 metres ===
Heats – 12 October

Rank	Heat	Name	Nationality	Time	Notes
1	1	Josefa Vicent	Uruguay	56.4	Q
2	1	Melania Fontanarrosa	Argentina	58.1	Q
3	1	Magaly Zumaeta	Peru	58.3	
4	1	Vera Silva	Brazil	1:00.7	
	1	Carmen Oyé	Chile	DNF	
1	2	Elsy Rivas	Colombia	56.4	Q
2	2	Cristina Filgueira	Argentina	57.7	Q
3	2	Gloria González	Chile	57.8	Q
4	2	Beatriz Pacheco	Peru	1:00.5	
5	2	Irenice Rodrigues	Brazil	1:14.6	

Final – 16 October

Rank	Name	Nationality	Time	Notes
1st place, gold medalist(s)	Josefa Vicent	Uruguay	54.9	CR
2nd place, silver medalist(s)	Elsy Rivas	Colombia	56.9	
3rd place, bronze medalist(s)	Cristina Filgueira	Argentina	57.1	
4	Gloria González	Chile	57.2	
5	Melania Fontanarrosa	Argentina	57.6	
6	Magaly Zumaeta	Peru	58.4	

=== 800 metres ===
Heats – 13 October

Rank	Heat	Name	Nationality	Time	Notes
1	1	Iris Fernández	Argentina	2:15.3	Q, CR
2	1	Maria Bernadete da Silva	Brazil	2:19.0	Q
3	1	Carmen Oyé	Chile	2:19.6	Q
4	1	Patricia Airaldi	Peru	2:26.3	
5	1	María Pesca	Uruguay	2:30.9	
1	2	Gloria González	Chile	2:18.6	Q
2	2	Ana María Nielsen	Argentina	2:19.6	Q
3	2	Magaly Zumaeta	Peru	2:23.9	Q
4	2	Vera Silva	Brazil	2:26.9	

Final – 17 October

Rank	Name	Nationality	Time	Notes
1st place, gold medalist(s)	Gloria González	Chile	2:12.1	CR
2nd place, silver medalist(s)	Carmen Oyé	Chile	2:13.3	
3rd place, bronze medalist(s)	Iris Fernández	Argentina	2:13.5	
4	Maria Bernadete da Silva	Brazil	2:15.9	
5	Magaly Zumaeta	Peru	2:21.7	
	Ana María Nielsen	Argentina	DQ	

=== 100 metres hurdles ===
Heats – 9 October

Rank	Heat	Name	Nationality	Time	Notes
1	1	Edith Noeding	Peru	14.4	Q, CR
2	1	Liliana Cragno	Argentina	14.5	Q
3	1	Valdéa Chagas	Brazil	14.5	Q
1	2	Emilia Dyrzka	Argentina	14.8	Q
2	2	Maria Luísa Betioli	Brazil	15.4	Q
3	2	Alicia Barrera	Peru	15.6	Q
4	2	Amaya Barturen	Chile	15.7	

Final – 10 October

Rank	Lane	Name	Nationality	Time	Notes
1st place, gold medalist(s)	6	Emilia Dyrzka	Argentina	14.3	CR
2nd place, silver medalist(s)	5	Liliana Cragno	Argentina	14.6	
3rd place, bronze medalist(s)	2	Valdéa Chagas	Brazil	14.7	
4	3	Edith Noeding	Peru	14.9	
5	4	Maria Luísa Betioli	Brazil	15.2	
6	1	Alicia Barrera	Peru	15.4	

=== 4 × 100 metres relay ===
17 October

Rank	Nation	Competitors	Time	Notes
1st place, gold medalist(s)	Argentina	Liliana Cragno, Angela Godoy, Beatriz Allocco, Irene Fitzner	46.7	
2nd place, silver medalist(s)	Peru	Carmela Bolívar, María Luisa Vilca, Edith Noeding, Patricia Morante	47.6	
3rd place, bronze medalist(s)	Uruguay	Mirtha Fleitas, Ana María Desevici, Alicia Gogluska, Josefa Vicent	48.2	
4	Chile	Paz Gallo, Yolanda Durand, Silvia Kinzel, Aurora Sáenz	48.6	
5	Brazil	Valdéa Chagas, Maria Cipriano, Sueli Vizintas, Aida dos Santos	48.6	

=== High jump ===
10 October

Rank	Name	Nationality	Result	Notes
1st place, gold medalist(s)	Jurema da Silva	Brazil	1.65	
2nd place, silver medalist(s)	Maria Cipriano	Brazil	1.65	
3rd place, bronze medalist(s)	Ana María Estrada	Argentina	1.60	
4	Amparo Bravo	Colombia	1.60	
5	Catalina Recordón	Chile	1.60	
6	Verónica Justiniano	Chile	1.55	
7	Mirtha Fleitas	Uruguay	1.55	
8	Ana Udini	Uruguay	1.50	
	Lila Negro	Argentina	NM	

=== Long jump ===
13 October

Rank	Name	Nationality	Result	Notes
1st place, gold medalist(s)	Silvia Kinzel	Chile	5.83	
2nd place, silver medalist(s)	Ana María Desevici	Uruguay	5.72	
3rd place, bronze medalist(s)	Edith Noeding	Peru	5.58	
4	Yolanda Durand	Chile	5.48	
5	Ana Clara Goldmann	Argentina	5.39	
6	Ana Omote	Brazil	5.32	

=== Shot put ===
10 October

Rank	Name	Nationality	Result	Notes
1st place, gold medalist(s)	Rosa Molina	Chile	14.66	CR
2nd place, silver medalist(s)	Maria Boso	Brazil	13.64	
3rd place, bronze medalist(s)	Delia Vera	Peru	12.84	
4	Sofía Módica	Argentina	12.09	
5	Miriam Finochietti	Uruguay	11.98	
6	Miriam Yutronic	Chile	11.82	
7	Luz María Quiñónez	Ecuador	11.32	
8	Aída dos Santos	Brazil	11.05	

=== Discus throw ===
9 October

Rank	Name	Nationality	Result	Notes
1st place, gold medalist(s)	Odete Domingos	Brazil	46.72	CR
2nd place, silver medalist(s)	Isolina Vergara	Colombia	45.67	
3rd place, bronze medalist(s)	Maria Boso	Brazil	42.19	
4	Irma Ortega	Argentina	42.07	
5	Ana María Mellado	Chile	41.45	
6	Miriam Yutronic	Chile	40.97	
7	Luz María Quiñónez	Ecuador	39.47	
8	María Barrera	Peru	34.29	

=== Javelin throw ===
10 October – Old model

Rank	Name	Nationality	Result	Notes
1st place, gold medalist(s)	Ana María Campillay	Argentina	43.92	
2nd place, silver medalist(s)	Kiyomi Nakagawa	Brazil	42.42	
3rd place, bronze medalist(s)	Rosa Molina	Chile	42.32	
4	Ana Julieta Scursoni	Argentina	41.06	
5	Delia Vera	Peru	40.82	
6	María Elena Rojas	Chile	40.26	

=== Pentathlon ===
16–17 October

The highest mark recorded in each event is highlighted in yellow

Rank	Athlete	Nationality	100m H	SP	HJ	LJ	200m	Points	Notes
1st place, gold medalist(s)	Aída dos Santos	Brazil	15.4	11.05	1.60	5.30	25.9	3716	
2nd place, silver medalist(s)	Edith Noeding	Peru	14.6	11.05	1.55	5.17	24.8	3635	
3rd place, bronze medalist(s)	María Luisa Vilca	Peru	15.6	10.03	1.50	5.16	24.8	3581	
4	Emilia Dyrzka	Argentina	14.4	10.83	1.40	5.24	26.0	3570	
5	Maria Luísa Betioli	Brazil	15.1	9.77	1.45	5.31	25.9	3501	
6	Ana Clara Goldmann	Argentina	16.4	10.25	1.53	5.43	27.2	3420	
7	Amaya Barturen	Chile	15.3	7.09	1.45	5.49	26.8	3251	
