= Athletics at the 1979 Pan American Games – Men's hammer throw =

Men's hammer throw at the 1979 Pan American Games
- Venue: Estadio Sixto Escobar
- Dates: 12 July
- Winning distance: 69.64

Medalists
| Gold medal | Scott Neilson | Canada |
| Silver medal | Armando Orozco | Cuba |
| Bronze medal | Genovevo Morejón | Cuba |

The men's hammer throw competition of the athletics events at the 1979 Pan American Games took place at the Estadio Sixto Escobar. The defending Pan American Games champion was Larry Hart of the United States.

== Records ==
Prior to this competition, the existing world and Pan American Games records were as follows:

| World record | Karl-Hans Riehm (FRG) | 80.32 | Heidenheim, West Germany | August 6, 1978 |
| Pan American Games record | Lawrence Hart (USA) | 66.56 | Mexico City, Mexico | 1975 |

== Results ==
All distances shown are in meters.

| KEY: | WR | World Record | GR | Pan American Record |

=== Final ===
| Rank | Name | Nationality | Distance | Notes |
|---|---|---|---|---|
| 1st place, gold medalist(s) | Scott Neilson | Canada | 69.64 | GR |
| 2nd place, silver medalist(s) | Armando Orozco | Cuba | 68.48 | |
| 3rd place, bronze medalist(s) | Genovevo Morejón | Cuba | 67.66 | |
| 4 | Andy Bessette | United States | 66.22 | |
| 5 | José Alberto Vallejo | Argentina | 59.50 | |
| 6 | Daniel Gómez | Argentina | 58.58 | |
| 7 | Luis Martínez | Puerto Rico | 54.20 | |
| 8 | Mario Egnem | Chile | 51.52 | |
| | Boris Djerassi | United States | DNS | |
| | Bill Green | United States | DNS | |
