= 1968 South American Junior Championships in Athletics =

VII South American Junior Championships in Athletics
- Dates: September 8–14
- Host city: São Bernardo do Campo, Brazil
- Venue: Estádio Distrital de Vila Euclides
- Level: Under-20
- Events: 29
- Participation: about 176 athletes from 8 nations

The seventh South American Junior Championships in Athletics were held in São Bernardo do Campo, Brazil, at the Estádio Distrital de Vila Euclides between September 8–14, 1968.

== Participation (unofficial) ==
Detailed result lists can be found on the "World Junior Athletics History" website. An unofficial count yields the number of about 176 athletes from about 8 countries: Argentina (39), Brazil (34), Chile (38), Colombia (5), Ecuador (5), Paraguay (17), Peru (23), Uruguay (15).

== Medal summary ==
Medal winners are published for men and women Complete results can be found on the "World Junior Athletics History" website.

=== Men ===
Event	Gold		Silver		Bronze	
100 metres	Jimmy Sierra (COL)	10.8	Carlos Ripoll (ARG)	10.8	Paulo Matschinske (BRA)	11.0
200 metres	Jimmy Sierra (COL)	21.7	Carlos Bertotti (ARG)	22.2	Julio Torres (CHI)	22.4
400 metres	Carlos Bertotti (ARG)	49.4	Iván Varas (CHI)	49.8	Ricardo Rovira (URU)	50.1
800 metres	Atílio Alegre (BRA)	1:55.7	Iván Varas (CHI)	1:56.0	Ricardo Rovira (URU)	1:58.5
1500 metres	Víctor Ríos (CHI)	3:57.5	Atílio Alegre (BRA)	3:57.5	Abel Córdoba (ARG)	4:02.4
3000 metres	Víctor Ríos (CHI)	8:45.7	Rafael Baracaldo (COL)	8:49.9	David Sandoval (PER)	8:55.2
110 metres hurdles	Márcio Lomónaco (BRA)	15.7	Alfredo Guzmán (CHI)	16.1	Kiyoshi Mizukawa (BRA)	16.1
400 metres hurdles	Carlos Saavedra (CHI)	55.9	Alfredo Guzmán (CHI)	56.3	Jarbas Benck (BRA)	56.5
1500 metres steeplechase	Atílio Alegre (BRA)	4:18.7	Rafael Baracaldo (COL)	4:24.3	Ricardo Montero (CHI)	4:24.6
4 × 100 metres relay	Argentina; Milton Copparoni; Carlos Bertotti; Virgilio Zunino; Carlos Ripoll	43.5	Chile; Julio Torres; Antonio Rioseco; E. Correa; Víctor Dumas	43.7	Brazil; Massimiti Massumoto; Angelo Takahara; Roberto dos Santos; Márcio Lomónaco	43.7
4 × 400 metres relay	Argentina; José Luis Amatti; Milton Copparoni; José Nist; Carlos Bertotti	3:20.9	Chile; Carlos Varas; Víctor Dumas; Bernardo Díaz; Alfredo López	3:22.0	Brazil; António Fonseca; Angelo Takahara; Atílio Alegre; Dorival Negrisoli	3:28.1
High jump	Luis Barrionuevo (ARG)	2.00	Luis Arbulú (PER)	2.00	Alberto Calio (ARG)	1.90
Pole vault	Ciro Valdés (COL)	3.70	Pedro Aratzabala (CHI)	3.60	Fernando Hoces (CHI)	3.60
Long jump	Eduardo Labalta (ARG)	7.14	Joel Dias (BRA)	6.93	Meberi Cuello (URU)	6.48
Triple jump	Joel Dias (BRA)	14.95	Miguel Zapata (COL)	14.13	Emilio Mazzeo (ARG)	13.88
Shot put	Juan Turri (ARG)	16.94	Cláudio Leal (BRA)	16.84	Paulo Matschinske (BRA)	15.42
Discus throw	Ronaldo Rascher (BRA)	39.62	Celso de Moraes (BRA)	39.12	José Deustua (PER)	38.52
Hammer throw	Celso de Moraes (BRA)	61.24	Tulio Tebaldi (PER)	49.68	Armando Fusaro (ARG)	49.54
Javelin throw	Álvaro Maururi (ECU)	52.24	Luis Cortina (ARG)	50.64	Oscar Raggio (ARG)	50.36
Pentathlon*	Jarbas Benck (BRA)	3694	Alberto Calio (ARG)	3476	Oscar Raggio (ARG)	3475

* = another source rather states: Hexathlon

=== Women ===
Event	Gold		Silver		Bronze	
100 metres	Josefa Vicent (URU)	11.9	Victoria Roa (CHI)	12.0	Juana Mosquera (COL)	12.2
200 metres	Josefa Vicent (URU)	25.0	Victoria Roa (CHI)	25.5	Juana Mosquera (COL)	25.7
80 metres hurdles	Ana Akiko Omote (BRA)	11.8	Alicia Cantarini (ARG)	11.8	Paz Gallo (CHI)	12.3
4 × 100 metres relay	Argentina; Patricia Morone; María Cristina Filgueira; Nora Peñas; Alicia Cantarini	48.2	Chile; Paz Gallo; Carla Maturana; Victoria Roa; Margarita Pérez	49.7	Uruguay; Raquel Amaro; Edith Varela; Alicia Gogluska; Josefa Vicent	50.0
High jump	Carolina Roche (ARG)	1.45	Sonia Neubauer (CHI)	1.45	Maria Custódio (BRA)	1.45
Long jump	Ana Akiko Omote (BRA)	5.65	Silvia Kinzel (CHI)	5.62	Patricia Morone (ARG)	5.25
Shot put	Gladys Ortega (ARG)	11.53	Neide Nakatsukasa (BRA)	11.05	Ana Julieta Scursoni (ARG)	10.60
Discus throw	Mirtha Salas (ARG)	35.98	Gladys Ortega (ARG)	35.96	Verónica Díaz (CHI)	32.18
Javelin throw	Ana Julieta Scursoni (ARG)	35.67	Gladys Ortega (ARG)	35.48	Irani Milani (BRA)	35.00

== Medal table (unofficial) ==
* Host nation (Brazil)

Rank	Nation	Gold	Silver	Bronze	Total
1	Argentina (ARG)	11	7	8	26
2	Brazil (BRA)*	9	5	8	22
3	Chile (CHI)	3	12	5	20
4	Colombia (COL)	3	3	2	8
5	Uruguay (URU)	2	0	4	6
6	Ecuador (ECU)	1	0	0	1
7	Peru (PER)	0	2	2	4
Totals (7 entries)		29	29	29	87
