= Athletics at the 1979 Pan American Games – Women's discus throw =

Women's discus throw at the 1979 Pan American Games
- Venue: Estadio Sixto Escobar
- Dates: 7 July
- Winning distance: 60.58

Medalists
Gold medal	Carmen Romero	Cuba
Silver medal	María Cristina Betancourt	Cuba
Bronze medal	Carmen Ionesco	Canada

The women's discus throw competition of the athletics events at the 1979 Pan American Games took place on 7 July at the Estadio Sixto Escobar. The defending Pan American Games champion was Carmen Romero of Cuba.

== Records ==
Prior to this competition, the existing world and Pan American Games records were as follows:

World record	Evelin Jahl (GDR)	70.72	Dresden, East Germany	August 12, 1978
Pan American Games record	Carmen Romero (CUB)	60.16	Mexico City, Mexico	1975

== Results ==
All distances shown are in meters.

KEY:	WR	World Record	GR	Pan American Record

=== Final ===
Rank	Name	Nationality	Distance	Notes
1st place, gold medalist(s)	Carmen Romero	Cuba	60.58	GR
2nd place, silver medalist(s)	María Cristina Betancourt	Cuba	60.44	
3rd place, bronze medalist(s)	Carmen Ionesco	Canada	57.14	
4	Lorna Griffin	United States	54.08	
5	Lucette Moreau	Canada	52.52	
6	Lynne Winbigler	United States	51.66	
7	Norma Azcune	Uruguay	40.36	
8	María Elena Cajigas	Puerto Rico	38.92	
