= Francisco Rojas Soto =

Paraguayan sprinter

Personal information
- Born: 16 October 1950 (age 76) Guazu-Cua, Paraguay
- Height: 1.80 m (5 ft 11 in)
- Weight: 73 kg (161 lb)

Sport
- Sport: Sprint, hurdles

Francisco Rojas Soto (born 16 October 1950) is a retired sprinter and hurdler from Paraguay.

== Career ==
Rojas competed in the 400 m at the 1972 Olympics but was eliminated in the first round. Rojas still holds the national record in the 400 m hurdles, which he set in Rio de Janeiro, Brazil. After retiring from competitions he worked at the Central Bank of Paraguay, and was eventually appointed as head of the Foreign Trade Division. Until 2013, for almost 20 years he was president of the Paraguayan Athletics Federation.

== International competitions ==
| Year | Competition | Venue | Position | Event | Notes |
Representing Paraguay
| 1971 | South American Championships | Lima, Peru | 4th (h) | 400 m | 49.1 |
| 1971 | South American Championships | Lima, Peru | 9th (h) | 110 m hurdles | 15.9 |
| 1971 | South American Championships | Lima, Peru | 6th | 400 m hurdles | 54.4 |
| 1971 | South American Championships | Lima, Peru | 6th | 4 × 100 m relay | 42.9 |
| 1971 | South American Championships | Lima, Peru | 6th | 4 × 400 m relay | 3:35.5 |
| 1972 | Olympic Games | Munich, West Germany | 41st (h) | 400 m | 47.46 |
| 1974 | South American Championships | Santiago, Chile | 8th | 400 m | 49.4 |
| 1974 | South American Championships | Santiago, Chile | 1st | 400 m hurdles | 52.1 |
| 1974 | South American Championships | Santiago, Chile | 4th | 4 × 100 m relay | 41.3 |
| 1974 | South American Championships | Santiago, Chile | 5th | 4 × 400 m relay | 3:27.7 |
| 1975 | Pan American Games | Mexico City, Mexico | 11th (h) | 400 m hurdles | 52.78 |

== Education and Military ==
After receiving his degrees in finance and mechanical engineering, Rojas came to Asunción, where he completed compulsory military service and graduated in economics in 1980. He started competing in running, initially barefoot, while studying in Asunción.

== Personal life ==
Rojas is married to Celsa Isabel Prentte, they have four children.
