= Athletics at the 1971 Pan American Games – Women's 200 metres =

Women's 200 metres at the Pan American Games

The women's 200 metres event at the 1971 Pan American Games was held in Cali on 31 July and 1 August.

== Medalists ==
Gold	Silver	Bronze
Stephanie Berto; Canada	Fulgencia Romay; Cuba	Esther Stroy; United States

== Results ==
=== Heats ===
Held on 31 July

Wind:
Heat 1: 0.0 m/s, Heat 2: 0.0 m/s, Heat 3: 0.0 m/s

Rank	Heat	Name	Nationality	Time	Notes
1	1	Stephanie Berto	Canada	23.5	Q
2	1	Silvia Chivás	Cuba	23.5	Q
3	1	Diva Bishop	Panama	24.5	Q
4	1	Joslyn Holder	Trinidad and Tobago	25.6	Q
5	1	Lourdes Vargas	Venezuela	25.6	Q
6	1	María Morante	Peru	26.5	
7	1	Russel Carrero	Nicaragua	26.5	
	1	Silvina Pereira da Silva	Brazil	DNS	
1	2	Rose Allwood	Jamaica	23.86	Q
2	2	Juana Mosquera	Colombia	24.23	Q
3	2	Patty Loverock	Canada	24.68	Q
4	2	Angela Godoy	Argentina	24.77	Q
5	2	Sandra Johnson	Costa Rica	24.85	Q
6	2	Laurie Barr	United States	24.95	q
7	2	María Luisa Vilca	Peru	24.99	
8	2	Claudette Powell	Bahamas	25.12	
1	3	Esther Stroy	United States	23.76	Q
2	3	Fulgencia Romay	Cuba	24.21	Q
3	3	Elsy Rivas	Colombia	24.59	Q
4	3	Josefa Vicent	Uruguay	24.86	Q
5	3	Irene Fitzner	Argentina	24.91	Q
6	3	Joan Porter	Trinidad and Tobago	24.97	
7	3	Cecilia Pérez	Venezuela	25.51	
8	3	Joyce Veira	Suriname	25.71	

=== Semifinals ===
Held on 1 August

Wind:
Heat 1: 0.0 m/s, Heat 2: 0.0 m/s

Rank	Heat	Name	Nationality	Time	Notes
1	1	Esther Stroy	United States	23.71	Q
2	1	Stephanie Berto	Canada	23.71	Q
3	1	Fulgencia Romay	Cuba	23.76	Q
4	2	Rose Allwood	Jamaica	23.96	Q
5	2	Silvia Chivás	Cuba	24.27	Q
6	2	Juana Mosquera	Colombia	24.43	Q
7	2	Patty Loverock	Canada	24.62	Q
8	1	Elsy Rivas	Colombia	24.71	Q
9	2	Diva Bishop	Panama	24.76	
10	2	Laurie Barr	United States	24.76	
11	1	Josefa Vicent	Uruguay	25.08	
12	1	Angela Godoy	Argentina	25.11	
13	2	Irene Fitzner	Argentina	25.46	
14	2	Sandra Johnson	Costa Rica	25.56	
15	1	Lourdes Vargas	Venezuela	25.86	
16	1	Joslyn Holder	Trinidad and Tobago	26.05	

=== Final ===
Held on 1 August

Wind: 0.0 m/s

Rank	Name	Nationality	Time	Notes
1st place, gold medalist(s)	Stephanie Berto	Canada	23.57	=GR
2nd place, silver medalist(s)	Fulgencia Romay	Cuba	23.70	
3rd place, bronze medalist(s)	Esther Stroy	United States	23.82	
4	Silvia Chivás	Cuba	23.95	
5	Rose Allwood	Jamaica	24.14	
6	Juana Mosquera	Colombia	24.26	
7	Elsy Rivas	Colombia	24.68	
8	Patty Loverock	Canada	24.91	
