= Elsy Rivas =

Colombian sprinter (born 1949)

Personal information
- Nationality: Colombian
- Born: 7 May 1949 (age 77)
- Height: 1.66 m (5 ft 5 in)
- Weight: 60 kg (132 lb)

Sport
- Sport: Sprinting
- Event: 400 metres
Medal record
Women's Athletics
Representing Colombia
Pan American Games
Bronze medal – third place	1971 Cali	4x100 m relay

Elsy Rivas (born 7 May 1949) is a retired Colombian sprinter. She competed in the women's 400 metres at the 1972 Summer Olympics. She won a bronze medal in the 4 x 100 metres relay at the 1971 Pan American Games.

== International competitions ==
Year	Competition	Venue	Position	Event	Notes
Representing Colombia
1965	Bolivarian Games	Quito, Ecuador	2nd	4 × 100 m relay	49.8
1969	South American Championships	Quito, Ecuador	11th (h)	100 m	12.9
1969	South American Championships	Quito, Ecuador	10th (h)	200 m	26.0
1969	South American Championships	Quito, Ecuador	6th	4 × 100 m relay	50.7
1971	Pan American Games	Cali, Colombia	7th	200 m	24.68
1971	Pan American Games	Cali, Colombia	10th (h)	400 m	56.74
1971	Pan American Games	Cali, Colombia	3rd	4 × 100 m relay	45.99
1971	Pan American Games	Cali, Colombia	5th	4 × 400 m relay	3:50.43
1971	South American Championships	Lima, Peru	2nd	200 m	24.5
1971	South American Championships	Lima, Peru	2nd	400 m	56.9
1972	Olympic Games	Munich, West Germany	43rd (h)	400 m	56.33
1974	Central American and Caribbean Games	Santo Domingo, Dominican Republic	8th	100 m	12.08
1974	Central American and Caribbean Games	Santo Domingo, Dominican Republic	5th	200 m	24.68
1974	South American Championships	Santiago, Chile	2nd	100 m	12.1
1974	South American Championships	Santiago, Chile	1st	200 m	24.1

== Personal bests ==
- 400 metres – 55.5 (1975)
