= Athletics at the 1971 Pan American Games – Men's hammer throw =

Men's hammer throw at the Pan American Games

The men's hammer throw event at the 1971 Pan American Games was held in Cali on 4 August.

== Results ==
Rank	Name	Nationality	Result	Notes
1st place, gold medalist(s)	Al Hal	United States	65.84	GR
2nd place, silver medalist(s)	George Frenn	United States	65.68	
3rd place, bronze medalist(s)	Darwin Piñeyrúa	Uruguay	61.54	
4	Víctor Suárez	Cuba	59.56	
5	José Alberto Vallejo	Argentina	59.46	
6	Celso de Moraes	Brazil	55.70	
7	Pedro Granell	Puerto Rico	52.10	
8	Gustavo Morales	Nicaragua	47.96	
