= Athletics at the 1971 Pan American Games – Women's 4 × 100 metres relay =

Women's 4 × 100 metres relay at the Pan American Games

The women's 4 × 100 metres relay event at the 1971 Pan American Games was held in Cali on 5 August.

== Results ==
Rank	Nation	Athletes	Time	Notes
1st place, gold medalist(s)	United States	Orien Brown, Pat Hawkins, Mattiline Render, Iris Davis	44.59	
2nd place, silver medalist(s)	Cuba	Silvia Chivás, Marlene Elejarde, Fulgencia Romay, Carmen Valdés	45.01	
3rd place, bronze medalist(s)	Colombia	Aida Ortíz, Ana Maquilón, Elsy Rivas, Juana Mosquera	45.99	
4	Canada	Gail Turner, Joyce Sadowick, Patty Loverock, Stephanie Berto	46.13	
5	Argentina	Angela Godoy, Cristina Filgueira, Beatriz Allocco, Irene Fitzner	46.76	
6	Peru	María Morante, Edith Noeding, Patricia Plaut, María Luisa Vilca	47.32	
	Jamaica	Lelieth Hodges, Yvonne Saunders, Marilyn Neufville, Rose Allwood	DQ	
	Venezuela	Lourdes Vargas, Adriana Marchena, Cecilia Pérez, Zulay Montaño	DNF	
