= Rosa Molina =

Chilean shot putter (born 1946)

Personal information
- Full name: Rosa Ester Molina Arias
- Born: 27 September 1946 (age 79) Concepción, Chile
- Height: 1.65 m (5 ft 5 in)
- Weight: 82 kg (181 lb)

Sport
- Sport: Athletics
- Events: Shot put, javelin throw

Rosa Ester Molina Arias (born 27 September 1946) is a Chilean athlete. She competed in the women's shot put at the 1968 Summer Olympics and the 1972 Summer Olympics.

== International competitions ==
Year	Competition	Venue	Position	Event	Notes
Representing Chile
1965	South American Championships	Rio de Janeiro, Brazil	3rd	Javelin throw	40.23 m
1967	Pan American Games	Winnipeg, Canada	6th	Shot put	14.50 m
1967	South American Championships	Buenos Aires, Argentina	1st	Shot put	14.26 m
1967	South American Championships	Buenos Aires, Argentina	2nd	Javelin throw	39.16 m
1968	Olympic Games	Mexico City, Mexico	12th	Shot put	12.85 m
1969	South American Championships	Quito, Ecuador	1st	Shot put	13.30 m
1969	South American Championships	Quito, Ecuador	1st	Javelin throw	45.52 m
1971	Pan American Games	Cali, Colombia	3rd	Shot put	14.50 m
1971	Pan American Games	Cali, Colombia	5th	Javelin throw	43.68 m
1971	South American Championships	Lima, Peru	1st	Shot put	14.66 m
1971	South American Championships	Lima, Peru	3rd	Javelin throw	42.32 m
1972	Olympic Games	Munich, West Germany	17th (q)	Shot put	14.61 m
1974	South American Championships	Santiago, Chile	1st	Shot put	14.93 m
1975	South American Championships	Rio de Janeiro, Brazil	2nd	Shot put	13.52 m
1985	South American Championships	Santiago, Chile	6th	Shot put	12.82 m

== Personal bests ==
Outdoor

- Shot put – 15.49 (Berlin 1972)
- Discus throw – 40.86 (1971)
- Javelin throw (old model) – 45.52 (1969)
