= Irene Fitzner =

Argentine sprinter

Personal information
- Full name: Irene Margarita Fitzner
- Nationality: Argentine
- Born: 14 November 1955 (age 70)
- Height: 1.72 m (5 ft 8 in)
- Weight: 60 kg (132 lb)

Sport
- Sport: Sprinting
- Event: 100 metres
Medal record
Women's athletics
Representing Argentina
South American Championships
Gold medal – first place	1971 Lima	4 x 100 metres
Silver medal – second place	1971 Lima	100 metres
South American Junior Championships
Gold medal – first place	1970 Cali	100 metres
Gold medal – first place	1970 Cali	200 metres
Gold medal – first place	1970 Cali	4 x 100 metres

Irene Margarita Fitzner (married Dahlgren; born 14 November 1955) is a retired Argentine sprinter. She competed in the women's 100 metres at the 1972 Summer Olympics.

Her daughter Jennifer Dahlgren is a retired hammer thrower.

== International competitions ==
Year	Competition	Venue	Position	Event	Notes
Representing Argentina
1970	South American Junior Championships	Cali, Colombia	1st	100 m	12.4
1970	South American Junior Championships	Cali, Colombia	1st	200 m	25.2
1970	South American Junior Championships	Cali, Colombia	1st	4 × 100 m relay	47.9
1971	Pan American Games	Cali, Colombia	9th (sf)	100 m	12.02
1971	Pan American Games	Cali, Colombia	13th (sf)	200 m	25.46
1971	Pan American Games	Cali, Colombia	5th	4 × 100 m relay	46.76
1971	South American Championships	Lima, Peru	2nd	100 m	12.3
1971	South American Championships	Lima, Peru	1st	4 × 100 m relay	46.7
1972	Olympic Games	Munich, West Germany	42nd (h)	100 m	12.51

== Personal bests ==
- 100 metres – 11.8h (Buenos Aires 1970)
- 200 metres – 25.1h (Buenos Aires 1971)
