= María Luisa Vilca =

Peruvian sprinter

Personal information
- Full name: María Luisa Vilca Alzola
- Nationality: Peruvian
- Born: 15 March 1948
- Died: 29 May 2019 (aged 71)
- Height: 1.64 m (5 ft 5 in)
- Weight: 58 kg (128 lb)

Sport
- Sport: Sprinting
- Event: 100 metres

María Luisa Vilca Alzola (15 March 1948 – 29 May 2019) was a Peruvian sprinter. She competed in the women's 100 metres at the 1972 Summer Olympics.

== International competitions ==
Year	Competition	Venue	Position	Event	Notes
Representing Peru
1967	South American Championships	Buenos Aires, Argentina	9th (h)	100 m	12.9
1967	South American Championships	Buenos Aires, Argentina	8th (h)	200 m	26.1
1967	South American Championships	Buenos Aires, Argentina	–	4 × 100 m relay	DQ
1969	South American Championships	Quito, Ecuador	3rd	100 m	12.3
1969	South American Championships	Quito, Ecuador	4th	200 m	25.4
1969	South American Championships	Quito, Ecuador	4th	4 × 100 m relay	48.6
1970	Bolivarian Games	Maracaibo, Venezuela	2nd	100 m	12.0
1970	Bolivarian Games	Maracaibo, Venezuela	2nd	Long jump	5.56 m
1971	Pan American Games	Cali, Colombia	7th	100 m	11.99
1971	Pan American Games	Cali, Colombia	16th (h)	200 m	24.99
1971	Pan American Games	Cali, Colombia	6th	4 × 100 m relay	47.32
1971	South American Championships	Lima, Peru	1st	100 m	12.0
1971	South American Championships	Lima, Peru	4th	200 m	24.6
1971	South American Championships	Lima, Peru	6th	4 × 100 m relay	47.32
1971	South American Championships	Lima, Peru	3rd	Pentathlon	3581 pts
1972	Olympcs Games	Munich, West Germany	31st (h)	100 m	11.85
1972	Olympcs Games	Munich, West Germany	25th (qf)	200 m	24.48
1973	Bolivarian Games	Panama City, Panama	2nd	4 × 100 m relay	47.5

== Personal bests ==
- 100 metres – 11.85 (1972)
- 200 metres – 24.41 (1972)
