= Luis Barrionuevo =

Argentine high jumper

Personal information
- Full name: Luis Bruno Barrionuevo
- Nationality: Argentine
- Born: 4 July 1949 (age 77)
- Height: 1.90 m (6 ft 3 in)
- Weight: 72 kg (159 lb)

Sport
- Sport: Athletics
- Event: High jump

Luis Bruno Barrionuevo (born 16 February 1949) is an Argentine athlete. He competed in the men's high jump at the 1972 Summer Olympics.

His personal best in the event is 2.17 metres set in 1977.

== International competitions ==
Year	Competition	Venue	Position	Notes
Representing Argentina
1968	South American Junior Championships	São Bernardo do Campo, Brazil	1st	2.00 m
1969	South American Championships	Quito, Ecuador	2nd	1.95 m
1971	Pan American Games	Cali, Colombia	6th	1.95 m
1971	South American Championships	Lima, Peru	1st	2.05 m
1972	Olympic Games	Munich, West Germany	36th (q)	1.90 m
1974	South American Championships	Santiago, Chile	2nd	2.06 m
1975	South American Championships	Rio de Janeiro, Brazil	2nd	2.03 m
1975	Pan American Games	Mexico City, Mexico	6th	2.09 m
1977	South American Championships	Montevideo, Uruguay	3rd	2.00 m
1979	Pan American Games	San Juan, Puerto Rico	10th	2.06 m
