= Luís da Silva =

Brazilian sprinter

Personal information
- Full name: Luís Gonzaga da Silva
- Nationality: Brazilian
- Born: 15 July 1946 (age 79)
- Height: 1.78 m (5 ft 10 in)
- Weight: 74 kg (163 lb)

Sport
- Sport: Sprinting
- Event: 100 metres

Luís Gonzaga da Silva (born 15 July 1946) is a Brazilian sprinter. He competed in the men's 100 metres at the 1972 Summer Olympics.

== International competitions ==
Year	Competition	Venue	Position	Event	Notes
Representing Brazil
1971	Pan American Games	Cali, Colombia	7th	100 m	10.60
1971	Pan American Games	Cali, Colombia	11th (sf)	200 m	21.46
1971	South American Championships	Lima, Peru	3rd	100 m	10.8
1971	South American Championships	Lima, Peru	5th	200 m	22.1
1971	South American Championships	Lima, Peru	1st	4 × 100 m relay	40.7
1972	Olympic Games	Munich, West Germany	35th (h)	100 m	10.63
1972	Olympic Games	Munich, West Germany	45th (h)	200 m	21.81
1974	South American Championships	Santiago, Chile	1st	4 × 100 m relay	40.3

== Personal bests ==
- 100 metres – 10.2 (1972)
- 200 metres – 21.4 (1971)
