= Athletics at the 1975 Pan American Games – Men's high jump =

Men's high jump at the Pan American Games

The men's high jump event at the 1975 Pan American Games was held in Mexico City on 16 October.

== Results ==
Rank	Name	Nationality	Result	Notes
1st place, gold medalist(s)	Tom Woods	United States	2.25	
2nd place, silver medalist(s)	John Beers	Canada	2.17	
3rd place, bronze medalist(s)	Rick Cuttell	Canada	2.17	
4	Richard Spencer	Cuba	2.15	
5	Clark Godwin	Bermuda	2.12	
6	Luis Barrionuevo	Argentina	2.09	
7	José de la Cerda	Mexico	2.06	
8	Javier Vivó	Mexico	2.06	
9	Benedito Francisco	Brazil	2.06	
10	Rudy Levarity	Bahamas	2.06	
11	Cristóbal de Leon	Dominican Republic	2.00	
12	Daniel Mamet	Argentina	2.00	
	Keith Guinn	United States	DNS	
