= Richard Spencer (athlete) =

Cuban high jumper

Personal information
- Born: 16 July 1955 (age 70) Holguín Province, Cuba

Sport
- Sport: Track and field
Medal record
Representing Cuba
Central American and Caribbean Games
Gold medal – first place	1974 Santo Domingo	High jump
Gold medal – first place	1978 Medellin	High jump

Richard Spencer Campbell (born 16 July 1955) is a Cuban former high jumper who competed in the 1976 Summer Olympics.

== International competitions ==
Year	Competition	Venue	Position	Notes
Representing Cuba
1973	Central American and Caribbean Championships	Maracaibo, Venezuela	1st	2.06 m
1974	Central American and Caribbean Games	Santo Domingo, Dominican Republic	1st	2.10 m
1975	Pan American Games	Mexico City, Mexico	4th	2.15 m
1976	Olympic Games	Montreal, Canada	29th (q)	2.05 m
1977	Central American and Caribbean Championships	Xalapa, Mexico	1st	2.15 m
1977	Universiade	Sofia, Bulgaria	4th	2.19 m
1977	World Cup	Düsseldorf, West Germany	6th	2.15 m^{1}
1978	Central American and Caribbean Games	Medellín, Colombia	1st	2.12 m
1979	Pan American Games	San Juan, Puerto Rico	8th	2.09 m
1982	Central American and Caribbean Games	Havana, Cuba	6th	2.11 m

^{1}Representing the Americas
