= Athletics at the 1971 Pan American Games – Women's discus throw =

Women's discus throw at the Pan American Games

The women's discus throw event at the 1971 Pan American Games was held in Cali on 31 July.

== Results ==
| Rank | Name | Nationality | Result | Notes |
|---|---|---|---|---|
| 1st place, gold medalist(s) | Carmen Romero | Cuba | 57.20 | GR |
| 2nd place, silver medalist(s) | María Cristina Betancourt | Cuba | 51.76 | |
| 3rd place, bronze medalist(s) | Carol Martin | Canada | 50.04 | |
| 4 | Joan Pavelich | Canada | 48.66 | |
| 5 | Renee Kletchka | United States | 48.32 | |
| 6 | Isolina Vergara | Colombia | 46.28 | |
| 7 | Irma Gladys | Argentina | 44.86 | |
| 8 | Luz María Quiñones | Ecuador | 43.68 | |
| 9 | Monette Driscoll | United States | 41.78 | |
| 10 | María Streber | Nicaragua | 32.36 | |
| | Dora Vázquez | Colombia | DNS | |
| | Marta Vázquez | El Salvador | DNS | |
