= Maria Boso =

Personal information
- Full name: Maria Angelina Boso
- Born: 20 September 1947

Sport
- Sport: Athletics
- Event(s): Shot put, discus throw

Maria Angelina Boso (born 20 September 1947) is a retired Brazilian athlete who competed in the shot put and discus throw. She won several medals at continental level.

== International competitions ==
Year	Competition	Venue	Position	Event	Notes
Representing Brazil
1969	South American Championships	Quito, Ecuador	3rd	Shot put	12.68 m
1969	South American Championships	Quito, Ecuador	6th	Discus throw	35.34 m
1970	Universiade	Turin, Italy	11th	Shot put	12.43 m
1970	Universiade	Turin, Italy	14th	Discus throw	35.54 m
1971	South American Championships	Lima, Peru	2nd	Shot put	13.64 m
1971	South American Championships	Lima, Peru	3rd	Discus throw	42.19 m
1974	South American Championships	Santiago, Chile	2nd	Shot put	13.99 m
1974	South American Championships	Santiago, Chile	5th	Discus throw	39.56 m
1975	South American Championships	Rio de Janeiro, Brazil	1st	Shot put	14.05 m
1975	South American Championships	Rio de Janeiro, Brazil	2nd	Discus throw	45.18 m
1975	Pan American Games	Mexico City, Mexico	7th	Shot put	14.40 m
1975	Pan American Games	Mexico City, Mexico	7th	Discus throw	45.08 m
1977	South American Championships	Montevideo, Uruguay	1st	Shot put	13.80 m
1979	South American Championships	Bucaramanga, Colombia	3rd	Shot put	13.24 m
1979	South American Championships	Bucaramanga, Colombia	2nd	Discus throw	42.54 m
