= Alberto Marchán =

Venezuelan sprinter

Personal information
- Nationality: Venezuelan
- Born: 29 April 1947 (age 79)
- Height: 1.76 m (5 ft 9 in)
- Weight: 72 kg (159 lb)

Sport
- Sport: Sprinting
- Event: 100 metres

Alberto Marchán (born 29 April 1947) is a retired Venezuelan sprinter. He competed in the men's 4 × 100 metres relay at the 1972 Summer Olympics.

== International competitions ==
Year	Competition	Venue	Position	Event	Notes
Representing Venezuela
1965	Bolivarian Games	Quito, Ecuador	1st	4 × 100 m relay	41.6
1970	Bolivarian Games	Maracaibo, Venezuela	3rd	100 m	10.4
1970	Bolivarian Games	Maracaibo, Venezuela	1st	4 × 100 m relay	40.5
1971	Central American and Caribbean Championships	Kingston, Jamaica	7th	100 m	10.9
1971	Central American and Caribbean Championships	Kingston, Jamaica	3rd	4 × 100 m relay	40.7
1971	Pan American Games	Cali, Colombia	15th (h)	100 m	10.60
1971	Pan American Games	Cali, Colombia	10th (sf)	200 m	21.39
1971	Pan American Games	Cali, Colombia	5th	4 × 100 m relay	40.53
1971	Pan American Games	Cali, Colombia	7th	4 × 400 m relay	3:08.9
1971	South American Championships	Lima, Peru	3rd	200 m	21.9
1971	South American Championships	Lima, Peru	2nd	4 × 100 m relay	40.9
1971	South American Championships	Lima, Peru	1st	4 × 400 m relay	3:14.8
1972	Olympic Games	Munich, West Germany	13th (sf)	4 × 100 m relay	39.74

== Personal bests ==
- 100 metres – 10.3 (1969)
