= Estádio 1º de Maio (São Bernardo do Campo) =

Football stadium in São Bernardo do Campo, Brazil

1.º de Maio
- "Primeirão"
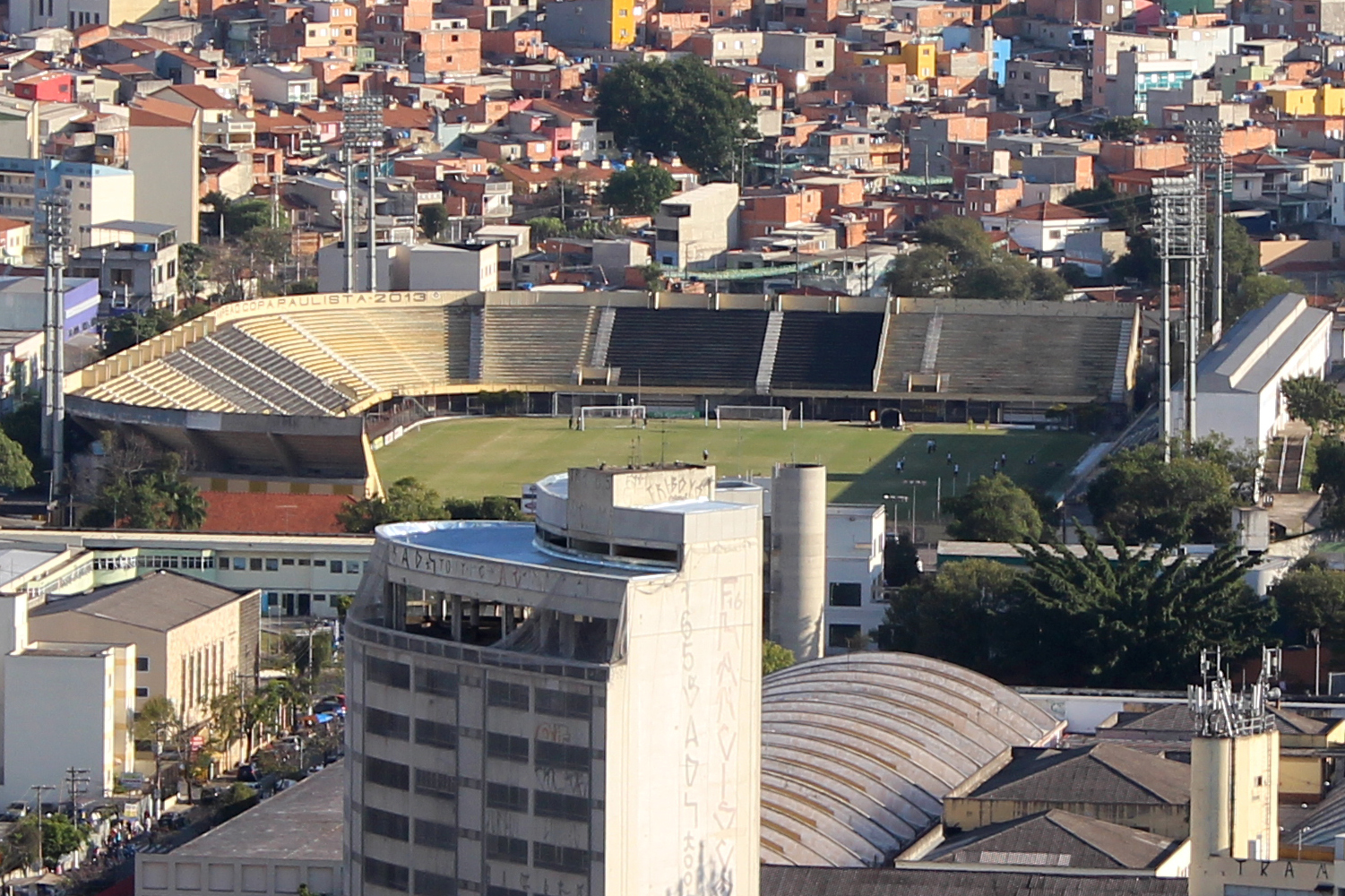
- Sisbrace
- Interactive map of 1.º de Maio
- Full name: Estádio Municipal 1º de Maio
- Former names: Estádio Distrital de Vila Euclides (1968–1973); Estádio Presidente Arthur da Costa e Silva (1973–1980)
- Location: Rua Olavo Bilac, 240; Jardim Olavo Bilac; São Bernardo do Campo
- Coordinates: 23°41′59.8″S 46°33′23″W
- Elevation: 766 metres (2,513 ft)
- Owner: São Bernardo do Campo Municipality
- Operator: São Bernardo Futebol Clube
- Capacity: 15,759 (full); 12,578 (regulated)
- Surface: Natural grass
- Record attendance: 15,159 (São Bernardo vs Corinthians, 30 January 2011)
- Field size: 105 by 68 metres (114.8 yd × 74.4 yd)
- Public transit: Terminal Paço

Construction
- Opened: 20 August 1968; 58 years ago
- Renovated: 1996
- Expanded: 2011

Tenants
- São Bernardo FC (2005–present); EC São Bernardo (1996–1996; 2019–2025); Palestra de São Bernardo (1997–2007)

Estádio 1.º de Maio is a football stadium in the centre of São Bernardo do Campo, Brazil, which is the home of São Bernardo FC. With a capacity of 15,159 it is the second-largest football stadium in the ABC region, behind Estádio Anacleto Campanella. Currently the capacity is limited to 12,578 since part of the South Stand is closed for renovation.

The stadium is perhaps best known as the site of multiple massive trade union rallies between 1979 and 1980, led by Luiz Inácio Lula da Silva. It is named after the International Workers' Day and the date of a significant rally held at the stadium in 1980, which involved over 150,000 workers on strike. 1º de Maio's record attendance was recorded in 2011, when 15,159 spectators watched a Campeonato Paulista fixture between São Bernardo FC and Corinthians, which ended in a 2–2 tie.

== History ==
=== Early years ===
In 1950, textile company Elni de Produtos Manufaturados started its operations in the neighbourhood of Vila Euclides. The company built a football field with an athletics track for its employees. Local amateur football teams also played there on Sundays. When Elni went bankrupt in 1964, the land where the company was located was taken by the municipal government. After the installation of floodlights and building of grandstands, the Estádio Distrital de Vila Euclides was inaugurated on the 20 August 1968, the city's 415th anniversary, with a football game between São Bernardo do Campo City Team and Santos, which ended in a 0–2 loss for the home team. The 1968 South American Junior Championships in Athletics were held at the stadium less than a month later.

In January 1973, the ground was named after former president Artur da Costa e Silva. Palestra de São Bernardo hosted Os Santásticos in a friendly match on 9 January 1974. Santos won the match 4–0 in front of over 7,500 spectators, with Pelé scoring his 1,200th career goal. He received a golden boot after the match.

=== Strike rallies ===
Labour strikes were severely repressed following the Coup of 1964. In 1978, Scania employees from São Bernardo do Campo defied the military dictatorship ban and went on strike on 12 May. This sparked off a series of other mobilizations in the city, notably by the metalworkers, led by then-union leader Luiz Inácio Lula da Silva. While the military government still opposed the strikes and repressed workers and trade unions, mayor Tito Costa supported the rallies and allowed the Vila Euclides stadium to be used for the workers' assemblies.

With over workers on strike demanding wages to match the inflation rates, the metalworkers' union held huge assemblies at the Vila Euclides stadium in 1979 and 1980. The 1 May 1980 rally was attended by over 150,000 people. On 12 November 1980, mayor Tito Costa renamed the stadium to Estádio 1º de Maio (First of May Stadium).

=== Renovations and leasing ===
Between 1989 and 1996, the stadium underwent a major refurbishment, with a max capacity expanded to 13,000. The first match to be played at the renewed 1º de Maio was a Campeonato Brasileiro match between Santos and Internacional on 29 September 1996.

The ground was redeveloped following São Bernardo FC's promotion to the 2011 Campeonato Paulista. The renovation cost around R$11,5 million and capacity was increased to over 15,000. Among the renovations there were a dugout for the benches, new toilets, a snack bar and a new first aid post. The changing room for the visiting teams was also remodelled. Furthermore, a new press area was built. The new structure has twelve cabins for radio stations and four for television, equipped with Wi-Fi connection and cable TV. The lighting system was also restored, with new floodlight towers at each corner of the stadium.

Also in 2011, 1º de Maio was leased to São Bernardo FC. In 2018, the São Bernardo do Campo City Hall revoked the leasing deal and started a bidding process the following year. On 11 February 2022, São Bernardo Futebol Clube were once again selected as the new tenants of the stadium. They paid R$719.433 for a ten-year lease, with an option for five more years.

== Structure and facilities ==
1º de Maio consists of two main single-tiered stands; the all-seater covered West Section, and the L-shaped terrace that comprises the South and East Sections. The North End of the pitch is an open area which faces the City Hall building.

The West Section is an all-seater stand that can currently hold 2,080 fans, as well as 201 more in the executive boxes. At the opposite side of the pitch is the East Section, an uncovered standing area that can hold up to 6,653 fans. The East Section consists of reinforced concrete steps. Below the stands there are two snack bars and two toilet rooms. The South Section can hold about 2,983 spectators and accommodates the away supporters during matches. It is an extension of the East Section, of which it is separated by a closed block of stands and a metal fence.
