= Kevin Johnson (sprinter) =

Bahamian sprinter (1951–2016)

Personal information
- Nationality: Bahamian
- Born: 9 April 1951 Nassau, Bahamas
- Died: 8 March 2016 (aged 64) Freeport, Bahamas

Sport
- Sport: Sprinting
- Event: 100 metres
- College team: Florida State Seminoles

Edwin Luther Kevin Johnson (9 April 1951 – 8 March 2016) was a Bahamian sprinter, long jumper, and police reservist. Johnson excelled in sprinting events during his high school career and won Floridan state titles in the men's 100 metres and 200 metres. He was then selected to compete for Bahamas at the 1966 British Empire and Commonwealth Games, though he did not medal in any of his events. At the 1968 Summer Olympics he competed in the men's 200 metres and advanced until the quarterfinals, and the men's 4 × 100 metres relay and advanced until the semifinals.

After the 1968 Summer Games, John also competed at the 1970 British Commonwealth Games and 1971 Pan American Games. He then competed at the 1972 Summer Olympics though did not medal in any of his events. He was part of the Florida State Seminoles after the 1972 Summer Games and won four state titles. After his sporting career, he became the Superintendent of the Royal Bahamas Police Force and was inducted to the Bahamas Sports Hall of Fame in 2014. He later died on 8 March 2016.

== Biography ==
Edwin Luther Kevin Johnson was born on 9 April 1951 in Nassau, Bahamas. For his middle school education, he studied at Attucks Middle School in Hollywood, Florida. There, he joined the school's track team and was coached by Fred Pinkston. He studied at Attucks High School for his high school education. During his time there, he became the Florida State Champion in the men's 100 metres and 200 metres in 1966. He was also part of the Bahamian team at the 1966 British Empire and Commonwealth Games.

Johnson was selected to be part of the Bahamian team at the 1968 Summer Olympics in Mexico City. He competed in the preliminaries of the men's 200 metres on 15 October. He ran in a time of 21.22 seconds and qualified for the quarterfinals. At the quarterfinals, he ran in a time of 21.41 seconds and did not advance to the semifinals. Johnson was also part of the men's 4 × 100 metres relay team for Bahamas, advancing to the semi-finals but were then disqualified. He then competed at the 1970 British Commonwealth Games though did not medal in his events.

At the 1971 Pan American Games, he competed in the men's 100 metres and 200 metres and did not medal, though he reached the finals of the men's 4 × 100 metres relay alongside his team. The following year, he competed at the 1972 Summer Olympics in Munich, Germany. He did not advance to the quarterfinals of the men's 100 metres after he placed sixth in his heat with a time of 10.91 seconds. He again did not advance to a further round in the men's 200 metres and did not start in the men's 4 × 100 metres relay.

During his college career, he was part of the Florida State Seminoles of Florida State University and won national state titles in the 60 yards, 100 yards, and long jump in 1977. He won another state title in 1980 after he was part of the Seminoles' men's 4 × 100 metres relay winning team.

After his sporting career, he became the Superintendent of the Royal Bahamas Police Force. Johnson also owned a business that specialized in housework. Due to his services in sport, he was inducted to the Bahamas Sports Hall of Fame in 2014. He later died on 8 March 2016 at the age of 64 in Freeport.

== International competitions ==
Year	Competition	Venue	Position	Event	Notes
Representing the Bahamas
1966	British Empire and Commonwealth Games	Kingston, Jamaica	47th (h)	100 y	10.6
1966	British Empire and Commonwealth Games	Kingston, Jamaica	28th (h)	220 y	22.2
1966	British Empire and Commonwealth Games	Kingston, Jamaica	–	4 × 110 y relay	DQ
1968	Olympic Games	Mexico City, Mexico	26th (qf)	200 m	21.41
1968	Olympic Games	Mexico City, Mexico	10th (h)	4 × 100 m relay	39.4^{1}
1970	Central American and Caribbean Games	Panama City, Panama	6th	100 m	10.6
1970	Central American and Caribbean Games	Panama City, Panama	4th	200 m	21.7
1970	British Commonwealth Games	Edinburgh, United Kingdom	22nd (h)	100 m	10.59 (w)
1970	British Commonwealth Games	Edinburgh, United Kingdom	16th (qf)	200 m	21.3 (w)
1970	British Commonwealth Games	Edinburgh, United Kingdom	–	4 × 100 m relay	DNF
1971	Pan American Games	Cali, Colombia	14th (sf)	100 m	10.74
1971	Pan American Games	Cali, Colombia	14th (h)	200 m	21.70
1971	Pan American Games	Cali, Colombia	6th	4 × 100 m relay	40.92
1972	Olympic Games	Munich, West Germany	66th (h)	100 m	10.91
1972	Olympic Games	Munich, West Germany	40th (h)	200 m	21.70

^{1}Disqualified in the semifinals
