= Athletics at the 1971 Pan American Games – Women's shot put =

Women's shot put at the Pan American Games

The women's shot put event at the 1971 Pan American Games was held in Cali on 4 August.

== Results ==
Rank	Name	Nationality	Result	Notes
1st place, gold medalist(s)	Lynn Graham	United States	15.76	GR
2nd place, silver medalist(s)	Grecia Hamilton	Cuba	14.63	
3rd place, bronze medalist(s)	Rosa Molina	Chile	14.50	
4	Carmen Romero	Cuba	14.16	
5	Lyne Matthews	United States	13.57	
6	Catalina Norma	Argentina	13.43	
7	Joan Pavelich	Canada	13.33	
8	Isolina Vergara	Colombia	12.09	
9	Dora Vázquez	Colombia	11.28	
10	Delia Vera	Peru	11.23	
11	Jenny Meldrum	Canada	11.07	
12	Martha Vázquez	El Salvador	10.93	
13	Luz María Quiñones	Ecuador	10.57	
	María Streber	Nicaragua	DNS	
