= Athletics at the 1970 Summer Universiade – Women's discus throw =

The women's discus throw event at the 1970 Summer Universiade was held at the Stadio Comunale in Turin with the final on 3 September 1970.

== Results ==
Rank	Name	Nationality	Result	Notes
1st place, gold medalist(s)	Karin Illgen	East Germany	62.04	UR
2nd place, silver medalist(s)	Brigitte Berendonk	West Germany	56.78	
3rd place, bronze medalist(s)	Liesel Westermann	West Germany	56.46	
4	Christine Spielberg	East Germany	55.84	
5	Diana Porter	Great Britain	54.44	
6	Carmen Romero	Cuba	51.04	
7	Vladimíra Srbová	Czechoslovakia	50.02	
8	Maria Stella Masocco	Italy	48.52	
9	Gay Porter	Great Britain	47.60	
10	Carol Martin	Canada	46.14	
11	Maria Luisa Fancello	Italy	45.68	
12	Paik Ok-ja	South Korea	45.12	
13	Sital Kaur Rai	India	37.30	
14	Maria Boso	Brazil	35.54	
