= Félix Mata =

Venezuelan sprinter

Personal information
- Nationality: Venezuelan
- Born: 30 January 1951
- Died: 26 April 2018 (aged 67)
- Height: 1.80 m (5 ft 11 in)
- Weight: 77 kg (170 lb)

Sport
- Sport: Sprinting
- Event: 100 metres

Félix Mata (30 January 1951 – 26 April 2018) was a Venezuelan sprinter. He competed in the men's 100 metres at the 1972 Summer Olympics.

== International competitions ==
Year	Competition	Venue	Position	Event	Notes
Representing Venezuela
1971	Central American and Caribbean Championships	Kingston, Jamaica	6th	100 m	10.7
1971	Central American and Caribbean Championships	Kingston, Jamaica	3rd	4 × 100 m relay	40.7
1971	Pan American Games	Cali, Colombia	16th (sf)	100 m	10.98
1971	Pan American Games	Cali, Colombia	5th	4 × 100 m relay	40.53
1971	South American Championships	Lima, Peru	1st	100 m	10.6
1971	South American Championships	Lima, Peru	2nd	4 × 100 m relay	40.9
1972	Olympic Games	Munich, West Germany	49th (h)	100 m	10.73
1972	Olympic Games	Munich, West Germany	13th (sf)	4 × 100 m relay	39.74
1973	Bolivarian Games	Panama City, Panama	1st	100 m	10.15 (w)
1973	Bolivarian Games	Panama City, Panama	2nd	200 m	21.2
1973	Bolivarian Games	Panama City, Panama	1st	4 × 100 m relay	40.8
1974	Central American and Caribbean Games	Santo Domingo, Dominican Republic	5th	100 m	10.87
1974	Central American and Caribbean Games	Santo Domingo, Dominican Republic	2nd	4 × 400 m relay	3:07.23
1975	Central American and Caribbean Championships	Ponce, Puerto Rico	3rd	100 m	10.7
1975	Central American and Caribbean Championships	Ponce, Puerto Rico	3rd	4 × 100 m relay	41.3

== Personal bests ==
- 100 metres – 10.1 (Hato Rey 1972)
