= Carlos Dalurzo =

Argentine middle-distance runner

Personal information
- Full name: Carlos Angel Dalurzo
- Nationality: Argentine
- Born: 9 April 1953
- Died: 12 October 2026 (aged 73)
- Height: 1.79 m (5 ft 10 in)
- Weight: 70 kg (154 lb)

Sport
- Sport: Middle-distance running
- Event: 800 metres

Carlos Angel Dalurzo (9 April 1953 – 12 October 2026) was an Argentine middle-distance runner. He competed in the men's 800 metres at the 1972 Summer Olympics.

== International competitions ==
| Year | Competition | Venue | Position | Event | Notes |
Representing Argentina
| 1971 | South American Championships | Lima, Peru | 1st | 800 m | 1:50.9 |
| 1971 | South American Championships | Lima, Peru | 2nd | 4 × 400 m relay | 3:15.8 |
| 1972 | Olympic Games | Munich, West Germany | 36th (h) | 800 m | 1:50.6 |

== Personal bests ==
- 800 metres – 1:50.6 (Munich 1972)
