= Athletics at the 1970 Summer Universiade – Women's shot put =

The women's shot put event at the 1970 Summer Universiade was held at the Stadio Comunale in Turin in September 1970.

== Results ==
Rank	Name	Nationality	Result	Notes
1st place, gold medalist(s)	Nadezhda Chizhova	Soviet Union	19.51	
2nd place, silver medalist(s)	Hannelore Friedel	East Germany	17.84	
3rd place, bronze medalist(s)	Ingeburg Friedrich	East Germany	17.03	
4	Brigitte Berendonk	West Germany	15.82	
5	Éva Veres	Hungary	15.08	
6	Paik Ok-ja	South Korea	15.01	
7	Vladimíra Srbová	Czechoslovakia	14.92	
8	Maria Stella Masocco	Italy	14.45	
9	Gay Porter	Ireland	13.99	
10	Diane Jones	Canada	12.62	
11	Maria Boso	Brazil	12.43	
12	Helga Deprez	Belgium	11.24	
