= Edmundo Warnke =

Chilean long-distance runner

Personal information
- Full name: Pedro Edmundo Warnke Bravo
- Born: 3 July 1951 (age 75) Viña del Mar, Chile

Sport
- Sport: Long-distance running
- Event: 5000 metres

Pedro Edmundo Warnke Bravo (born 3 July 1951) is a Chilean long-distance runner. He competed in the 5000 metres at the 1972 Summer Olympics and the 1976 Summer Olympics. Warnie finished fourth in the 5,000 metres at the 1971 Pan American Games and sixth in the 5,000 and 10,000 metres in the 1975 Pan American Games. In the 1979 Pan American Games, he finished fifth in the marathon.

== International competitions ==
Year	Competition	Venue	Position	Event	Notes
Representing Chile
1971	Pan American Games	Cali, Colombia	4th	5000 m	14:05.57
1971	South American Championships	Lima, Peru	1st	5000 m	14:07.6
1971	South American Championships	Lima, Peru	1st	10,000 m	29:14.6
1971	South American Championships	Lima, Peru	1st	Marathon	2:34:31
1972	Olympic Games	Munich, West Germany	19th (h)	5000 m	13:43.6
1974	South American Games	Santiago, Chile	1st	5000 m	14:17.6
1974	South American Games	Santiago, Chile	2nd	10,000 m	29:32.8
1975	South American Championships	Rio de Janeiro, Brazil	5th	1500 m	3:56.8
1975	South American Championships	Rio de Janeiro, Brazil	3rd	5000 m	14:05.6
1975	South American Championships	Rio de Janeiro, Brazil	3rd	10,000 m	28:46.2
1975	Pan American Games	Mexico City, Mexico	6th	5000 m	15:10.66
1975	Pan American Games	Mexico City, Mexico	6th	10,000 m	30:31.67
1976	Olympic Games	Montreal, Canada	20th (h)	5000 m	13:39.69
1976	Olympic Games	Montreal, Canada	22nd (h)	10,000 m	28:43.63
1976	Saint Silvester Road Race	São Paulo, Brazil	1st	8.9 km	23:50
1979	Pan American Games	San Juan, Puerto Rico	5th	Marathon	2:26:14

== Personal bests ==
Outdoor

- 1500 metres – 3:49.3 (Valpo 1971)
- 3000 metres – 7:56.0 (Valpo 1976)
- 5000 metres – 13:36.76 (Cologne 1976)
- 10,000 metres – 28:18.10 (Munich 1976)
- Marathon – 2:14:57 (Neuf Brisach 1976)
