= Fernando Hoces =

Personal information
- Full name: Fernando Sergio Hoces de la Guardia Molina
- Born: 22 June 1949 (age 77)

Sport
- Sport: Athletics
- Event: Pole vault

Fernando Sergio Hoces de la Guardia Molina (born 22 June 1949) is a retired Chilean athlete who specialised in the pole vault. He won several medals at continental level.

His personal best in the event is 4.90 metres set in La Paz in 1981. This is a former national record.

== International competitions ==
Year	Competition	Venue	Position	Notes
Representing Chile
1968	South American Junior Championships	São Bernardo do Campo, Brazil	3rd	3.60 m
1971	South American Championships	Lima, Peru	2nd	4.20 m
1974	South American Championships	Santiago, Chile	–	DQ
1977	South American Championships	Montevideo, Uruguay	3rd	4.10 m
1981	South American Championships	La Paz, Bolivia	1st	4.90 m
1982	Southern Cross Games	Santa Fe, Argentina	1st	4.80 m
1983	South American Championships	Santa Fe, Argentina	1st	4.70 m
