= Athletics at the 1975 Pan American Games – Men's hammer throw =

Men's hammer throw at the Pan American Games

The men's hammer throw event at the 1975 Pan American Games was held in Mexico City on 18 October.

== Results ==
Rank	Name	Nationality	#1	#2	#3	#4	#5	#6	Result	Notes
1st place, gold medalist(s)	Larry Hart	United States	64.98	62.90	64.80	x	65.52	66.56	66.56	GR
2nd place, silver medalist(s)	Ángel Cabrera	Cuba	51.08	60.22	62.20	x	65.24	63.40	65.24	
3rd place, bronze medalist(s)	Scott Neilson	Canada	63.24	x	x	63.80	63.80	64.56	64.56	
4	Murray Keating	Canada	60.00	63.10	60.26	63.20	60.76	64.06	64.06	
5	Celso de Moraes	Brazil	60.46	61.40	62.20	61.54	62.60	63.80	63.80	
6	José Alberto Vallejo	Argentina	62.46	62.10	63.00	60.54	62.36	63.76	63.76	
7	George Frenn	United States	x	57.42	60.24	63.22	x	61.30	63.22	
8	Darwin Piñeyrúa	Uruguay							62.12	
9	Alfonso Rodríguez	Mexico							49.60	
	Víctor Taracena	Guatemala	x	x	x				NM	
