= Darwin Piñeyrúa =

Uruguayan hammer thrower

Personal information
- Born: 23 December 1945 Montevideo, Uruguay
- Died: 11 February 1978 (aged 32)

Sport
- Sport: Athletics
- Event: Hammer throw

Darwin Piñeyrúa (23 December 1945 – 11 February 1978) was a Uruguayan athlete. He competed in the men's hammer throw at the 1972 Summer Olympics. He was the flag bearer for Uruguay in the opening ceremony.

He died at an early age as a result of a melanoma on his head. The main track and field venue in Uruguay, the Pista de Atletismo Darwin Piñeyrúa, was named in his honour in 2010. There is also an annual memorial athletics competition in his name Grand Prix Darwin Piñeyrúa which takes place on the said stadium in March.

== International competitions ==
| Year | Competition | Venue | Position | Event | Notes |
Representing Uruguay
| 1964 | South American Junior Championships | Santiago, Chile | 3rd | Shot put | 14.22 m |
| 1967 | South American Championships | Buenos Aires, Argentina | 6th | Shot put | 13.81 m |
| 1967 | South American Championships | Buenos Aires, Argentina | 10th | Discus throw | 35.62 m |
| 1967 | South American Championships | Buenos Aires, Argentina | 4th | Hammer throw | 52.52 m |
| 1969 | South American Championships | Quito, Ecuador | 3rd | Hammer throw | 56.48 m |
| 1971 | Pan American Games | Cali, Colombia | 3rd | Hammer throw | 61.54 m |
| 1971 | South American Championships | Lima, Peru | 4th | Shot put | 14.89 m |
| 1971 | South American Championships | Lima, Peru | 2nd | Hammer throw | 61.36 m |
| 1972 | Olympic Games | Munich, West Germany | 31st (q) | Hammer throw | 59.84 m |
| 1974 | South American Championships | Santiago, Chile | 6th | Shot put | 14.42 m |
| 1974 | South American Championships | Santiago, Chile | 1st | Hammer throw | 62.99 m |
| 1975 | South American Championships | Rio de Janeiro, Brazil | 5th | Shot put | 14.50 m |
| 1975 | South American Championships | Rio de Janeiro, Brazil | 6th | Discus throw | 43.04 m |
| 1975 | South American Championships | Rio de Janeiro, Brazil | 1st | Hammer throw | 61.20 m |
| 1975 | Pan American Games | Mexico City, Mexico | 8th | Hammer throw | 62.12 m |
