= José Alberto Vallejo =

Argentine hammer thrower (born 1942)

Personal information
- Nationality: Argentine
- Born: 22 October 1942 (age 83)

Sport
- Sport: Athletics
- Event: Hammer throw

José Alberto Vallejo (born 22 October 1942) is an Argentine athlete. He competed in the men's hammer throw at the 1972 Summer Olympics.

== International competitions ==
Year	Competition	Venue	Position	Event	Notes
Representing Argentina
1961	South American Junior Championships	Santa Fe, Argentina	1st	Shot put	12.91 m
1961	South American Junior Championships	Santa Fe, Argentina	2nd	Hammer throw	48.97 m
1962	Ibero-American Games	Madrid, Spain	6th	Hammer throw	53.12 m
1963	South American Championships	Cali, Colombia	6th	Shot put	13.69 m
1963	South American Championships	Cali, Colombia	4th	Hammer throw	54.12 m
1965	South American Championships	Rio de Janeiro, Brazil	5th	Shot put	14.37 m
1965	South American Championships	Rio de Janeiro, Brazil	2nd	Hammer throw	54.94 m
1967	Pan American Games	Winnipeg, Canada	4th	Hammer throw	60.32 m
1967	South American Championships	Buenos Aires, Argentina	9th	Shot put	13.31 m
1967	South American Championships	Buenos Aires, Argentina	1st	Hammer throw	58.84 m
1969	South American Championships	Quito, Ecuador	1st	Hammer throw	61.58 m
1971	Pan American Games	Cali, Colombia	5th	Hammer throw	59.46 m
1971	South American Championships	Lima, Peru	4th	Discus throw	45.14 m
1971	South American Championships	Lima, Peru	1st	Hammer throw	62.82 m
1972	Olympic Games	Munich, West Germany	30th (q)	Hammer throw	60.08 m
1974	South American Championships	Santiago, Chile	7th	Shot put	14.05 m
1974	South American Championships	Santiago, Chile	2nd	Hammer throw	61.55 m
1975	South American Championships	Rio de Janeiro, Brazil	2nd	Hammer throw	61.10 m
1975	Pan American Games	Mexico City, Mexico	6th	Hammer throw	63.76 m
1977	South American Championships	Montevideo, Uruguay	8th	Discus throw	40.48 m
1977	South American Championships	Montevideo, Uruguay	4th	Hammer throw	63.22 m
1978	Southern Cross Games	La Paz, Bolivia	1st	Shot put	14.46 m
1978	Southern Cross Games	La Paz, Bolivia	2nd	Discus throw	46.76 m
1978	Southern Cross Games	La Paz, Bolivia	1st	Hammer throw	63.90 m
1979	Pan American Games	San Juan, Puerto Rico	5th	Hammer throw	59.50 m
1979	South American Championships	Bucaramanga, Colombia	1st	Hammer throw	63.44 m
