= Carmen Romero =

Cuban discus thrower

Personal information
- Born: 6 October 1950 (age 76) Santiago de Cuba, country

Sport
- Sport: Track and field
Medal record
Representing Cuba
Pan American Games
Gold medal – first place	1971 Cali	Discus throw
Gold medal – first place	1975 Mexico City	Discus throw
Gold medal – first place	1979 San Juan	Discus throw
Central American and Caribbean Games
Gold medal – first place	1970 Panama City	Discus throw
Gold medal – first place	1974 Santo Domingo	Discus throw
Gold medal – first place	1978 Medellin	Discus throw
Silver medal – second place	1982 Havana	Discus throw
Bronze medal – third place	1966 San Juan	Discus throw
Bronze medal – third place	1970 Panama City	Shot put

Carmen Romero Ferrer (born 6 October 1950) is a retired Cuban discus thrower. Her personal best throw was 69.08 metres, achieved in April 1976 in Havana.

== International competitions ==
Year	Competition	Venue	Position	Event	Notes
Representing Cuba
1966	Central American and Caribbean Games	San Juan, Puerto Rico	3rd	Discus	39.07 m
1969	Central American and Caribbean Championships	Havana, Cuba	1st	Discus	51.41 m
1970	Central American and Caribbean Games	Panama City, Panama	3rd	Shot put	13.63 m
1970	Central American and Caribbean Games	Panama City, Panama	1st	Discus	53.54 m
1970	Universiade	Turin, Italy	6th	Discus	51.04 m
1971	Central American and Caribbean Championships	Kingston, Jamaica	1st	Shot put	14.25 m
1971	Central American and Caribbean Championships	Kingston, Jamaica	1st	Discus	55.24 m
1971	Pan American Games	Cali, Colombia	4th	Shot put	14.16 m
1971	Pan American Games	Cali, Colombia	1st	Discus	57.20 m
1973	Central American and Caribbean Championships	Maracaibo, Venezuela	1st	Discus	52.46 m
1974	Central American and Caribbean Games	Santo Domingo, Dominican Republic	1st	Discus	54.70 m
1975	Pan American Games	Mexico City, Mexico	1st	Discus	60.16 m
1976	Olympic Games	Montreal, Canada	9th	Discus	61.18 m
1978	Central American and Caribbean Games	Medellín, Colombia	1st	Discus	60.54 m
1979	Pan American Games	San Juan, Puerto Rico	1st	Discus	60.58 m
1980	Olympic Games	Moscow, USSR	10th	Discus	60.86 m
1981	Central American and Caribbean Championships	Santo Domingo, Dominican Republic	2nd	Discus	61.68 m
1981	World Cup	Rome, Italy	4th	Discus	61.60 m^{1}
1982	Central American and Caribbean Games	Havana, Cuba	2nd	Discus	61.98 m
1983	Central American and Caribbean Championships	Havana, Cuba	1st	Discus	58.58 m

^{1}Representing the Americas
