= Willie Deckard =

American track and field athlete

Personal information
- Born: January 3, 1951
- Died: May 6, 2023 (aged 72)

Sport
- Sport: Running
- Events: 100 yards, 100 metres, 200 metres
Medal record
Representing the United States
Pan American Games
Bronze medal – third place	1971 Cali	4×100 m relay

Willie Deckard (January 3, 1951 – May 6, 2023) was a track and field athlete that competed as a sprinter at Dorsey High School, LA City College, and USC.

== High school ==
June 1968, Deckard (Dorsey High School) won the 220-yard dash at the California State Track and Field Championship. Earlier in the season Deckard was the leading L.A. City high school sprinter 9.6 (100) and 21.2 (220), and won the Helms Athletic Foundation L.A. City Athlete of the Year.

== College ==
May 1969, Deckard (LA City College) was second in the 100-yard dash in the Junior College division at the West Coast Relays

May 1971, Willie Deckard (of USC) assisted USC in defeating UCLA with his 9.2 (100-yard), 20.2 (220-yard), and 4×110 relay performance. The 9.2 and 20.2 were Meet Records. The 9.2 was tied for the top World mark in 1971, and the 20.2 was the top American mark in 1971.

May 1971, Deckard set a UW stadium record of 9.4 in the 100-yard dash at the Pacific-8 Track and Field Championship. Deckard won the 100-yard and 220-yard finals.

June 1971, at the NCAA Track and Field Championship, Deckard (USC) set a stadium record (20.5) in a 220-yard heat and was part of the winning 4×110 Relay. Relay team included Lance Babb.

July 1971, Deckard placed 2nd in the 200 meter in the USA vs USSR vs The World Track Meet. The meet was part of the USA–USSR Track and Field Dual Meet Series.

Deckard was the leading 1st round qualifier in the 200-meter dash at the 1971 Pan American Games in Cali, Colombia, however he did not finish the final. Later he ran on the bronze medal-winning 4×100 relay that was nipped in a photo finish for the silver by Cuba.

June 1, 1972, Deckard (USC) ran 10.0 (100-meter) and a 20.2 wind aided (200-meter) during the qualification rounds at the NCAA Track and Field Championship in Eugene. USC's 4 × 100 metres relay team (Williams, Brown, Garrison, and Deckard) won at the Championship.

== Post college ==
July 1972, Deckard joined the California International Track Club.

July 1, 1972, Deckard ran a 9.9 wind aided 100-meter dash at the 1972 Olympic Trials. Deckard placed 5th in the 200-meter final.

Feb 1973, Deckard won the 60-yard dash at the Seattle Indoor T&F Meet in 6.0 (a new meet record).

May 1973, Deckard won the 220-yard dash in the Invitational Division at the Mt. SAC Relays.

May 1976, Deckard ran a 20.6 for the 200-meter dash at an All-Comers Meet at UC Irvine.

Coached track and field at several high schools.

== Honors ==
April 2009, Deckard was inducted into the USC Dual Meet Hall of Fame.
