= Athletics at the 1975 Pan American Games – Women's discus throw =

Women's discus throw at the Pan American Games

The women's discus throw event at the 1975 Pan American Games was held in Mexico City on 13 October.

== Results ==
Rank	Name	Nationality	#1	#2	#3	#4	#5	#6	Result	Notes
1st place, gold medalist(s)	Carmen Romero	Cuba	57.90	58.28	54.24	60.16	58.58	59.76	60.16	
2nd place, silver medalist(s)	María Cristina Betancourt	Cuba	56.32	54.14	58.52	57.90	x	56.88	58.52	
3rd place, bronze medalist(s)	Jane Haist	Canada	48.56	x	53.12	49.16	x	x	53.12	
4	Lucette Moreau	Canada	49.72	x	50.34	52.16	x	50.82	52.16	
5	Jan Svendsen	United States							48.94	
6	Odete Domingos	Brazil							47.76	
7	Maria Boso	Brazil							45.08	
8	Terry Sabol	United States							43.86	
9	Lisbeth Matzdorf	Guatemala							37.44	
10	Orlanda Lynch	Suriname							37.29	
11	Luz Gómez	Mexico							35.68	
