= 1969 South American Championships in Athletics =

- Dates: 4–12 October
- Host city: Quito, Ecuador
- Venue: Estadio Atahualpa
- Events: 34
- Participation: 204 athletes from 8 nations

The 1969 South American Championships in Athletics were held at the Estadio Atahualpa in Quito, Ecuador, between 4 and 12 October.

It was the first time that the Championships were held in Ecuador and the last time until the 2021 edition held in Guayaquil. It was the first edition to feature women's 400 metres and pentathlon. It was also the last edition to feature women's 80 metres hurdles which was replaced with 100 metres hurdles from the next edition on.

== Medal summary ==
=== Men's events ===
Event	Gold		Silver		Bronze	
100 metres	Iván Moreno; Chile	10.6A	Fernando Acevedo; Peru	10.6A	Andrés Calonge; Argentina	10.7A
200 metres	Iván Moreno; Chile	20.9A =CR	Fernando Acevedo; Peru	21.0A	Andrés Calonge; Argentina	21.1A
400 metres	Andrés Calonge; Argentina	46.9A	Raúl Dome; Venezuela	47.6A	José Rabaça; Brazil	47.9A
800 metres	Jorge Grosser; Chile	1:54.1A	Darcy Pereira; Brazil	1:55.5A	Roberto Salmona; Chile	1:55.9A
1500 metres	Jorge Grosser; Chile	4:04.7A	Roberto Salmona; Chile	4:06.5A	Clelio Jacome; Ecuador	4:08.5A
5000 metres	Víctor Mora; Colombia	15:36.6A	Clelio Jacome; Ecuador	15:41.4A	José Ramírez; Chile	15:49.3A
10,000 metres	Víctor Mora; Colombia	32:27.2A	Mario Cutropia; Argentina	32:28.6A	José Ramírez; Chile	32:41.0A
Marathon	Pedro Cárdenas; Colombia	2:36:36A	José Ramírez; Chile	2:43:41A	Mario Cutropia; Argentina	2:46:56A
110 metres hurdles	Patricio Saavedra; Chile	14.6A	Alfredo Deza; Peru	14.6A	Enrique Rendón; Venezuela	14.7A
400 metres hurdles	Juan Carlos Dyrzka; Argentina	52.0A	Jorge Vallecilla; Ecuador	52.7A	Santiago Gordon; Chile	52.8A
3000 metres steeplechase	Jorge Grosser; Chile	9:51.2A	Víctor Mora; Colombia	9:53.1A	Rafael Baracaldo; Colombia	9:53.2A
4 × 100 metres relay	Colombia; Jimmy Sierra; Wenceslao Ferrín Sr. Óscar Loboa; Pedro Grajales	40.2A CR	Peru; Fernando Acevedo; Jorge Alemán; Julio Chía; Roberto Lay Su	40.7A	Chile; Einar Erlandsen; Patricio Saavedra; Iván Moreno; Juan Santiago Gordón	40.7A
4 × 400 metres relay	Argentina; Andrés Calonge; Juan Carlos Dyrzka; Carlos Bertotti; José Luis Amatti	3:12.3A CR	Brazil; José Rabaca; Darcy Pereira; Napoleão Menezes; Juradir Ienne	3:13.2A	Peru; Fernando Acevedo; Jorge Alemán; Rosales; Alfredo Deza	3:13.7A
High jump	Luis Arbulú; Peru	2.00A =CR	Luis Barrionuevo; Argentina; José Dalmastro; Argentina	1.95A		
Pole vault	Daniel Argoitía; Argentina	4.40A CR	Ciro Valdés; Colombia	4.10A	Augusto León Piqueras; Peru	3.70A
Long jump	Admilson Chitarra; Brazil	7.60A CR	Iván Moreno; Chile	7.54A	Eduardo Labalta; Argentina	7.21A
Triple jump	Nelson Prudêncio; Brazil	16.34A CR	Joel Dias; Brazil	14.80A	Ariel González; Argentina	14.65A
Shot put	José Jacques; Brazil	16.88A CR	Mario Peretti; Argentina	15.65A	Juan Turri; Argentina	15.64A
Discus throw	Dagoberto González; Colombia	51.66A	José Jacques; Brazil	50.88A	Gustavo Gutiérrez; Colombia	50.64A
Hammer throw	José Vallejo; Argentina	61.58A AR	Celso de Moraes; Brazil	56.50A	Darwin Piñeyrúa; Uruguay	56.48A
Javelin throw	Rolf Hoppe; Chile	69.76A CR	Paulo de Faría; Brazil	63.50A	Jorge Peña; Chile	62.98A
Decathlon	Héctor Thomas; Venezuela	6720A	Paulo Matschinske; Brazil	6124A	Arno Lagies; Chile	5948A

=== Women's events ===
Event	Gold		Silver		Bronze	
100 metres	Silvina Pereira; Brazil	11.7A CR	Josefa Vicent; Uruguay	11.9A	María Luisa Vilca; Peru	12.3A
200 metres	Silvina Pereira; Brazil	24.0A AR	Josefa Vicent; Uruguay	24.6A	Cristina Filgueira; Argentina	25.0A
400 metres	Josefa Vicent; Uruguay	56.1A CR	Melania Fontanarrosa; Argentina	57.4A	Cristina Filgueira; Argentina	57.5A
800 metres	Melania Fontanarrosa; Argentina	2:17.8A	Iris Fernández; Argentina	2:18.4A	Lourdes Vega; Ecuador	2:32.3A
80 metres hurdles	Carlota Ulloa; Chile	11.0A CR	Graciela Paviotti; Argentina	11.4A	Ana Udini; Uruguay	11.4A
4 × 100 metres relay	Brazil; Silvina Pereira; Elisabeth Nunes; Aída dos Santos; Gloria Ferraz	46.0A AR	Argentina; Liliana Cragno; Cristina Filgueira; Alicia Kaufmanas; Alicia Masuccio	47.0A	Chile; Silvia Kinzel; Gloria González; Sara Montecinos; Aurora Sáenz	48.6A
High jump	Maria da Conceição; Brazil	1.70A CR	Aída dos Santos; Brazil	1.60A	Patricia Montero; Peru; Ana Udini; Uruguay	1.55A
Long jump	Silvina Pereira; Brazil	5.85A	Alicia Kaufmanas; Argentina	5.70A	Ana Akiko Omote; Brazil	5.61A
Shot put	Rosa Molina; Chile	13.30A	Neide Gomes; Brazil	13.02A	Maria Boso; Brazil	12.68A
Discus throw	Odete Domingos; Brazil	42.92A	Gladys Ortega; Argentina	41.92A	Isolina Vergara; Colombia	40.48A
Javelin throw	Rosa Molina; Chile	45.52A	Flor Umaña; Colombia	43.74A	Kiyomi Nakagawa; Brazil	41.02A
Pentathlon	Aída dos Santos; Brazil	4422A CR	Elisabeth Nunes; Brazil	4234A	Carlota Ulloa; Chile	4107A

A = affected by altitude

== Medal table ==
Rank	Nation	Gold	Silver	Bronze	Total
1	Brazil (BRA)	10	10	4	24
2	Chile (CHI)	10	3	9	22
3	Argentina (ARG)	6	10	8	24
4	Colombia (COL)	5	3	3	11
5	Peru (PER)	1	4	4	9
6	Uruguay (URU)	1	2	3	6
7	Venezuela (VEN)	1	1	1	3
8	Ecuador (ECU)	0	2	2	4
Totals (8 entries)		34	35	34	103

== Participating nations ==
- Argentina (45)
- Brazil (40)
- Chile (30)
- Colombia (23)
- Ecuador (24)
- Peru (27)
- Uruguay (9)
- Venezuela (6)
