= 1971 South American Championships in Athletics =

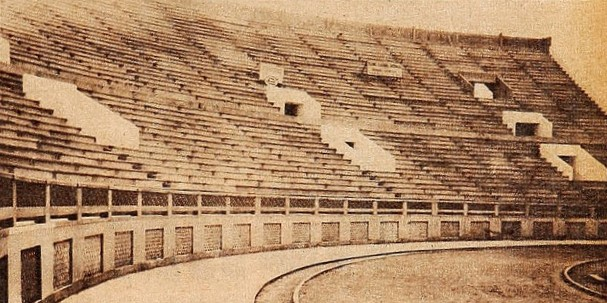
- Dates: 9–17 October
- Host city: Lima, Peru
- Venue: Estadio Nacional
- Events: 34
- Participation: 208 athletes from 8 nations

The 1971 South American Championships in Athletics were held at the Estadio Nacional in Lima, Peru, between 9 and 17 October.

It was the first edition to feature women's 100 metres hurdles which replaced 80 metres hurdles.

== Medal summary ==
=== Men's events ===
| Event | Gold | | Silver | | Bronze | |
|---|---|---|---|---|---|---|
| 100 metres | Félix Mata; Venezuela | 10.6 | Pedro Bassart; Argentina | 10.7 | Luís da Silva; Brazil | 10.8 |
| 200 metres | Fernando Acevedo; Peru | 21.2 | Pedro Bassart; Argentina | 21.8 | Alberto Marchán; Venezuela | 21.9 |
| 400 metres | Fernando Acevedo; Peru | 46.4 =CR | João Francisco; Brazil | 47.9 | José Rabaça; Brazil | 48.0 |
| 800 metres | Carlos Dalurzo; Argentina | 1:50.9 | Roberto Salmona; Chile | 1:51.6 | Fernando Sotomayor; Chile | 1:51.6 |
| 1500 metres | Víctor Ríos; Chile | 3:48.6 | Roberto Salmona; Chile | 3:48.9 | Atílio Alegre; Brazil | 3:49.5 |
| 5000 metres | Edmundo Warnke; Chile | 14:07.6 CR | Víctor Mora; Colombia | 14:08.8 | Domingo Tibaduiza; Colombia | 14:15.4 |
| 10,000 metres | Edmundo Warnke; Chile | 29:14.6 CR | Víctor Mora; Colombia | 29:17.6 | Domingo Tibaduiza; Colombia | 29:24.8 |
| Marathon | Martín Pavón; Colombia | 2:26:11 CR | Hernán Barreneche; Colombia | 2:32:20 | Edmundo Warnke; Chile | 2:34:31 |
| 110 metres hurdles | Enrique Rendón; Venezuela | 14.8 | Alfredo Deza; Peru | 14.8 | Patricio Saavedra; Chile | 14.8 |
| 400 metres hurdles | Juan Carlos Dyrzka; Argentina | 52.4 | Dorival Negrisoli; Brazil | 53.0 | Eduardo Rodrigues; Brazil | 53.2 |
| 3000 metres steeplechase | Víctor Mora; Colombia | 9:03.8 | Francisco Vega; Peru | 9:17.8 | Fernando Sotomayor; Chile | 9:19.6 |
| 4 × 100 metres relay | Brazil; Luiz Anunciação; Luís da Silva; Jorge Mathias; João Francisco | 40.7 | Venezuela; Orlando Cubillán; Félix Mata; Alberto Marchán; Segundo Guerra | 40.9 | Peru; Andrés Pérez; Julio Chia; Velit; Fernando Acevedo | 41.2 |
| 4 × 400 metres relay | Venezuela; Segundo Guerra; Alberto Marchán; Erick Phillips; Raúl Dome-Sanhouse | 3:14.8 | Argentina; Carlos Intaschi; Carlos Dalurzo; Juan Carlos Dyrzka; Alberto Gajate | 3:15.8 | Brazil; Jorge Mathias; José Rabaça; Dorival Negrisoli; João Francisco | 3:16.1 |
| High jump | Luis Barrionuevo; Argentina | 2.05 CR | Roberto Abugattás; Peru | 2.05 | José Dalmastro; Argentina | 2.00 |
| Pole vault | Erico Barney; Argentina | 4.50 CR | Fernando Hoces; Chile | 4.20 | Armando Chiamulera; Brazil | 4.20 |
| Long jump | Miguel Zapata; Chile | 7.41 | Luiz de Souza; Brazil | 7.34 | Ricardo Labalta; Argentina | 7.30A |
| Triple jump | Nelson Prudêncio; Brazil | 15.58 | Manuel Gutiérrez; Colombia | 14.94 | Roberto dos Santos; Uruguay | 14.75 |
| Shot put | José Jacques; Brazil | 16.85 | Juan Turri; Argentina | 15.73 | Mario Peretti; Argentina | 15.63 |
| Discus throw | Sérgio Thomé; Brazil | 53.82 | José Jacques; Brazil | 53.14 | Gustavo Gutiérrez; Colombia | 47.78 |
| Hammer throw | José Vallejo; Argentina | 62.82 CR | Darwin Piñeyrúa; Uruguay | 61.36 | Celso de Moraes; Brazil | 57.74 |
| Javelin throw | Paulo de Faría; Brazil | 69.68 | Gustavo Gutiérrez; Colombia | 65.90 | Jorge Peña; Chile | 64.72 |
| Decathlon | Héctor Thomas; Venezuela | 6880 | Ramón Montezuma; Venezuela | 6662 | Emilio Mazzeo; Argentina | 6656 |

=== Women's events ===
| Event | Gold | | Silver | | Bronze | |
|---|---|---|---|---|---|---|
| 100 metres | María Luisa Vilca; Peru | 12.0 | Irene Fitzner; Argentina | 12.3 | Josefa Vicent; Uruguay | 12.3 |
| 200 metres | Josefa Vicent; Uruguay | 24.4 | Elsy Rivas; Colombia | 24.5 | Angela Godoy; Argentina | 24.6 |
| 400 metres | Josefa Vicent; Uruguay | 54.9 CR | Elsy Rivas; Colombia | 56.9 | Cristina Filgueira; Argentina | 57.1 |
| 800 metres | Gloria González; Chile | 2:12.1 CR | Carmen Oyé; Chile | 2:13.3 | Iris Fernández; Argentina | 2:13.5 |
| 100 metres hurdles | Emilia Dyrzka; Argentina | 14.3 CR | Liliana Cragno; Argentina | 14.6 | Valdéa Chagas; Brazil | 14.7 |
| 4 × 100 metres relay | Argentina; Liliana Cragno; Angela Godoy; Beatriz Allocco; Irene Fitzner | 46.7 | Peru; Carmela Bolívar; María Luisa Vilca; Edith Noeding; Patricia Morante | 47.6 | Uruguay; Mirtha Fleitas; Ana María Desevici; Alicia Gogluska; Josefa Vicent | 48.2 |
| High jump | Jurema da Silva; Brazil | 1.65 | Maria Cipriano; Brazil | 1.65 | Ana María Estrada; Argentina | 1.60 |
| Long jump | Silvia Kinzel; Chile | 5.83 | Ana Desevici; Uruguay | 5.72 | Edith Noeding; Peru | 5.58 |
| Shot put | Rosa Molina; Chile | 14.66 CR | Maria Boso; Brazil | 13.64 | Delia Vera; Peru | 12.83 |
| Discus throw | Odete Domingos; Brazil | 46.72 CR | Isolina Vergara; Colombia | 45.67 | Maria Boso; Brazil | 42.19 |
| Javelin throw | Ana María Campillay; Argentina | 43.92 | Kiyomi Nakagawa; Brazil | 42.42 | Rosa Molina; Chile | 42.32 |
| Pentathlon | Aída dos Santos; Brazil | 3716 | Edith Noeding; Peru | 3635 | María Luisa Vilca; Peru | 3581 |

== Medal table ==
| Rank | Nation | Gold | Silver | Bronze | Total |
|---|---|---|---|---|---|
| 1 | Brazil | 8 | 7 | 9 | 24 |
| 2 | Argentina | 8 | 6 | 8 | 22 |
| 3 | Chile | 7 | 4 | 6 | 17 |
| 4 | Venezuela | 4 | 2 | 1 | 7 |
| 5 | Peru | 3 | 5 | 4 | 12 |
| 6 | Colombia | 2 | 8 | 3 | 13 |
| 7 | Uruguay | 2 | 2 | 3 | 7 |
| Totals (7 entries) | | 34 | 34 | 34 | 102 |

== Participating nations ==
- Argentina (44)
- Brazil (43)
- Chile (33)
- Colombia (13)
- Ecuador (9)
- Paraguay (8)
- Peru (35)
- Uruguay (12)
- Venezuela (11)
