= Celso de Moraes =

Personal information
- Full name: Celso Joaquim de Moraes
- Born: 9 May 1949 (age 76)

Sport
- Sport: Athletics
- Event: Hammer throw

Celso Joaquim de Moraes (born 9 May 1949) is a retired Brazilian athlete who specialised in the hammer throw. He won multiple medals at regional level.

His personal best in the event is 65.50 metres set in Porto Alegre in 1978. This is a former national record.

== International competitions ==
Year	Competition	Venue	Position	Event	Notes
Representing Brazil
1966	South American Junior Championships	Montevideo, Uruguay	3rd	Hammer throw	53.20 m
1967	South American Championships	Buenos Aires, Argentina	9th	Hammer throw	48.62 m
1968	South American Junior Championships	São Bernardo do Campo, Brazil	2nd	Discus throw	39.12 m
1968	South American Junior Championships	São Bernardo do Campo, Brazil	1st	Hammer throw	61.24 m
1969	South American Championships	Quito, Ecuador	2nd	Hammer throw	56.50 m
1971	Pan American Games	Cali, Colombia	6th	Hammer throw	55.70 m
1971	South American Championships	Lima, Peru	3rd	Hammer throw	57.74 m
1974	South American Championships	Santiago, Chile	3rd	Hammer throw	59.34 m
1975	South American Championships	Rio de Janeiro, Brazil	3rd	Hammer throw	60.84 m
1975	Pan American Games	Mexico City, Mexico	5th	Hammer throw	63.80 m
1977	South American Championships	Montevideo, Uruguay	2nd	Hammer throw	63.52 m
1979	South American Championships	Bucaramanga, Colombia	2nd	Hammer throw	61.44 m
1981	South American Championships	La Paz, Bolivia	7th	Discus throw	43.96 m
1981	South American Championships	La Paz, Bolivia	2nd	Hammer throw	61.22 m
1985	South American Championships	Santiago, Chile	2nd	Hammer throw	60.20 m
