= Craig Blackman =

Canadian sprinter

Personal information
- Born: 25 March 1951 (age 74) Toronto, Ontario, Canada

Sport
- Sport: Sprinting
- Event: 4 × 400 metres relay
- Club: Scarborough

Craig Blackman (born 25 March 1951) is a Canadian sprinter. He competed in the men's 4 × 400 metres relay at the 1972 Summer Olympics.
