= Josefa Vicent =

Uruguayan sprinter

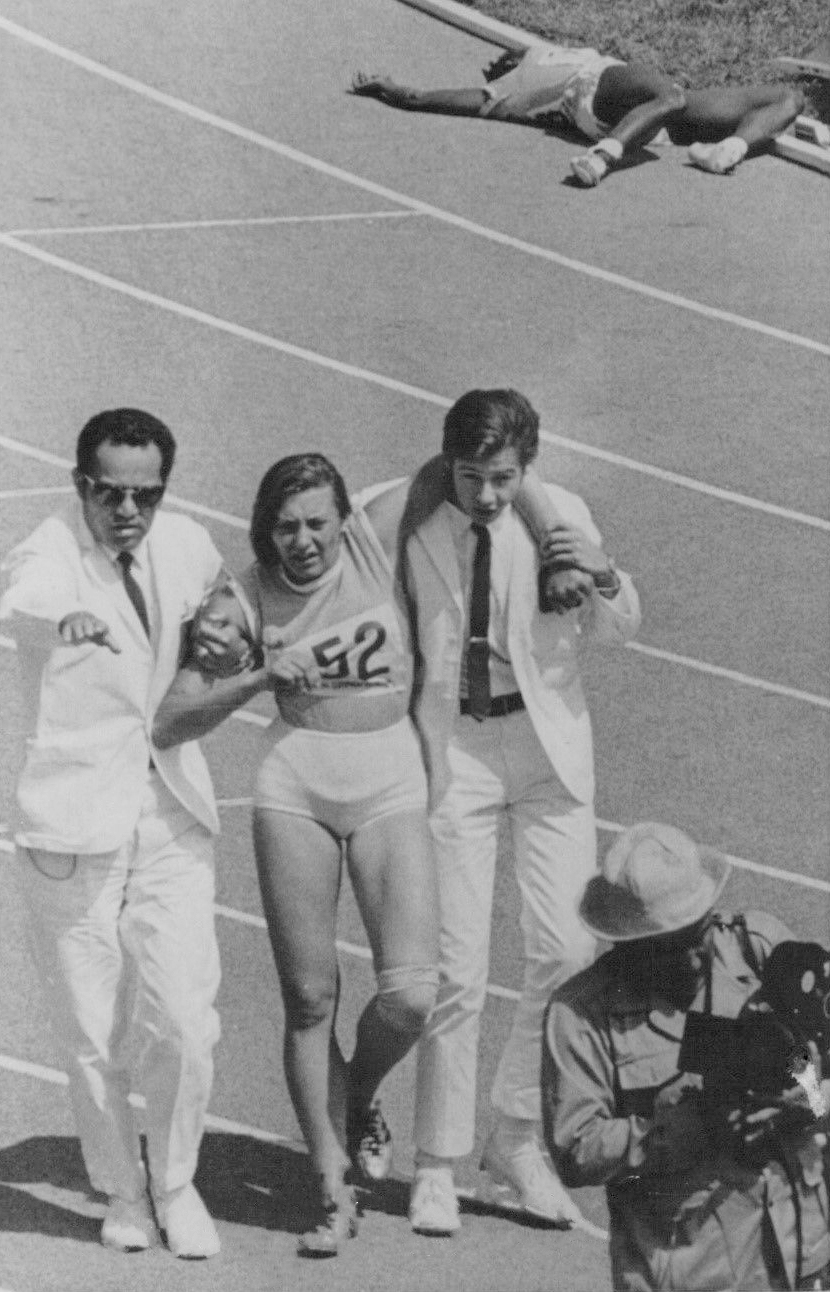
- Josefa Vicent aided at the end of the 400-metre race in the 1968 Summer Olympics (an exhausted Olajumoke Bodunrin in the background)

Personal information
- Full name: Josefa Vicent Riesgo
- Nationality: Uruguayan
- Born: 7 May 1950 (age 75) Barcelona, Spain
- Height: 1.63 m (5 ft 4 in)
- Weight: 58 kg (128 lb)

Sport
- Sport: Sprinting
- Event: 100 metres

Josefa Vicent Riesgo (born 7 May 1950) is a Uruguayan sprinter. She competed in the women's 100 metres at the 1968 Summer Olympics. She is the most successful athlete for Uruguay in the history of the South American championships.

== International competitions ==
Year	Competition	Venue	Position	Event	Notes
Representing Uruguay
1966	South American Junior Championships	Montevideo, Uruguay	2nd	100 m	12.2
1966	South American Junior Championships	Montevideo, Uruguay	1st	200 m	25.7
1966	South American Junior Championships	Montevideo, Uruguay	4th	4 × 100 m relay	50.3
1967	South American Championships	Buenos Aires, Argentina	4th (h)	100 m	12.5
1967	South American Championships	Buenos Aires, Argentina	4th	200 m	25.2
1967	South American Championships	Buenos Aires, Argentina	2nd	4 × 100 m relay	48.5
1968	South American Junior Championships	São Bernardo do Campo, Brazil	1st	100 m	11.9
1968	South American Junior Championships	São Bernardo do Campo, Brazil	1st	200 m	25.0
1968	South American Junior Championships	São Bernardo do Campo, Brazil	3rd	4 × 100 m relay	50.0
1968	Olympic Games	Mexico City, Mexico	40th (h)	100 m	12.5
1968	Olympic Games	Mexico City, Mexico	33rd (h)	200 m	24.8
1968	Olympic Games	Mexico City, Mexico	25th (h)	400 m	56.3
1969	South American Championships	Quito, Ecuador	2nd	100 m	11.9
1969	South American Championships	Quito, Ecuador	2nd	200 m	24.6
1969	South American Championships	Quito, Ecuador	1st	400 m	56.1
1971	Pan American Games	Mexico City, Mexico	11th (sf)	200 m	25.08
1971	Pan American Games	Mexico City, Mexico	9th (h)	400 m	56.13
1971	South American Championships	Lima, Peru	3rd	100 m	12.3
1971	South American Championships	Lima, Peru	1st	200 m	24.4
1971	South American Championships	Lima, Peru	1st	400 m	54.9
1971	South American Championships	Lima, Peru	3rd	4 × 100 m relay	48.2
1972	Olympic Games	Munich, West Germany	28th (h)	200 m	25.09^{1}
1972	Olympic Games	Munich, West Germany	41st (h)	400 m	55.33
1974	South American Championships	Santiago, Chile	8th	200 m	25.3
1974	South American Championships	Santiago, Chile	4th	4 × 400 m relay	3:56.2
1975	South American Championships	Rio de Janeiro, Brazil	4th	100 m	12.0
1975	South American Championships	Rio de Janeiro, Brazil	5th	200 m	25.0
1975	South American Championships	Rio de Janeiro, Brazil	3rd	4 × 400 m relay	3:56.4

^{1}Did not start in the quarterfinals

== Personal bests ==
- 100 metres – 11.8 (1969)
- 200 metres – 24.4 (1971)
- 400 metres – 54.9 (1971)
