= Larry Hart (athlete) =

American hammer thrower (born 1946)

Personal information
- Born: September 17, 1946 (age 79) Kansas City, Missouri, U.S.
Medal record
Men's Athletics
Representing the United States
Pan American Games
Gold medal – first place	1975 Mexico City	Hammer throw

Lawrence Thomas Hart (born September 17, 1946, in Kansas City, Missouri) is an American athlete who won the gold medal in the men's hammer throw event at the 1975 Pan American Games. He set his personal best (68.84 metres) on June 11, 1976, at a meet in Westwood, Los Angeles, California.

Hart competed in the discus throw, weight throw, and hammer throw for the Army Black Knights track and field team in the NCAA.

Hart has continued throwing into the Masters age divisions. On June 20, 2015, he set the American M65 record in the hammer throw, surpassing his own previous mark and that of former rival Ed Burke.
