= Tom Woods (high jumper) =

American high jumper (born 1953)

Tom Woods (born April 7, 1953) is a retired male high jumper from the United States, who competed in the 1970s for his native country. He set his personal best in the men's high jump event (2.27 metres) on 1975-06-20 in Eugene, Oregon, winning the national title.

Competing for the Oregon State Beavers track and field team, Woods won the 1972 NCAA University Division Outdoor Track and Field Championships in the high jump.

== Achievements ==
Year	Competition	Venue	Position	Notes
1972	US National Championships	Seattle, Washington	6th	2.13 m
1973	US National Championships	Bakersfield, California	2nd	2.22 m
1976	US Olympic Trials	Los Angeles, California	7th	2.18 m
1975	Pan American Games	Mexico City, Mexico	1st	2.25 m
1975	US National Championships	Eugene, Oregon	1st	2.27 m
1978	US National Championships	Los Angeles, California	5th	2.15 m
