= Raymond Fabien =

Trinidad and Tobago sprinter

Raymond Fabien (born 1 October 1945 in Port-of-Spain) is a retired sprinter from Trinidad and Tobago.

He competed in 4 x 100 metres relay at the 1968 Olympic Games, but the team consisting of Fabien, Carl Archer, Edwin Roberts and Winston Short was knocked out in the semi-final. Fabien later competed in both 100 metres and relay at the 1971 Pan American Games, but without reaching the final.
