= Marshall Dill =

American sprinter

Personal information
- Nationality: American
- Born: August 9, 1952 (age 73) Detroit, Michigan

Sport
- Sport: Running
- Event: Sprints
- College team: Michigan State Spartans

Achievements and titles
- Personal best: 200m: 20.39 (Cali 1971)
Medal record
Men's Athletics
Representing the United States
Pan American Games
Silver medal – second place	1971 Cali	200 meters

Marshall Dill (born August 9, 1952) is an American former sprinter. He is a native of Detroit and a 1971 graduate of Northern High School; Dill was one of the most successful interscholastic track and field athletes in the United States.

1971 was an exceptional year for Northern High School senior Marshall Dill; by season's end, his laurels would include:

- State and National High School Track Athlete of the Year.
- Ranked 4th Globally at 200 meters (:20.39 seconds)
- Ranked 5th Globally at 100 meters (:10.10 seconds)
- U.S. High School Record at 100 meters and 200 meters
- Six Michigan High School Athletic Association titles; 100 yards (1970–71), 220 yards (1969-1971), and 880 yard relay (1971)
- First place at the Golden West Meet of Champions, 100 yards and 220 yards
- Fourth place at the National AAU Championships, 220 yards
- Second place at the Pan American Games, 200 meters

Of particular note is Marshall Dill's winning time in the 220 yard dash at the 1971 MHSAA Championships (converted to :20.5 seconds for 200 meters)—a mark that still stands as the Michigan high school record. He was Track and Field News "High School Athlete of the Year" in 1971.

== Collegiate career ==
After accepting an athletic scholarship to Michigan State University, Marshall Dill picked up right where he left off in high school; winning a total of eleven indoor and outdoor Big Ten Conference titles in the sprint and relay events—including four consecutive conference championships in the outdoor 220 yard dash. In 1972, Marshall Dill led Michigan State to Big Ten Team Championships in both indoor and outdoor track; that same year, MSU finished second (by one point) to the University of Southern California at the NCAA Indoor Track and Field Championships.

A three-time All-American for the Spartans, Dill's self-proclaimed career pinnacle was winning the 1973 NCAA outdoor title at 200 meters. Others, however, have argued that Dill's greatest accomplishment was the world record he set while running the indoor 300-yard dash in 1973. Dill was inducted into the Michigan State University Athletic Hall of Fame in 2007.

Awards
Preceded by Dave Tucker	Track & Field News High School Boys Athlete of the Year; 1971	Succeeded by Craig Brigham
Records
Preceded by N/A	Men's World Junior Record Holder, 200 metres 3 August 1971 – 22 June 1976	Succeeded by (United States) Dwayne Evans
