= Víctor Ríos =

Mexican footballer (born 2004)

Personal information
- Full name: Víctor Hugo Ríos de Alba
- Date of birth: 11 February 2004 (age 22)
- Place of birth: Durango, Durango, Mexico
- Height: 1.91 m (6 ft 3 in)
- Position: Midfielder

Team information
- Current team: Atlas
- Number: 27

Youth career
- 2016–2023: Atlas

Senior career*
Years	Team	Apps	(Gls)
2023–	Atlas	78	(3)

International career^{‡}
2024	Mexico U23	1	(0)
- * Club domestic league appearances and goals as of 20 November 2026 ‡ National team caps and goals as of 2 May 2026

Víctor Hugo Ríos de Alba (born 11 February 2004) is a Mexican professional footballer who plays as a midfielder for Liga MX club Atlas.

== Club career ==
Ríos began his career at the academy of Atlas before making his professional debut in Leagues Cup in 2023 against Toronto, being subbed in at the 90th minute of a 1–0 win. In January 2024, he made his Liga MX debut in a 1–2 loss to Necaxa, where he was subbed in at the 85th minute.

== Career statistics ==
=== Club ===
As of match played on 20 November 2026

Club	Season	League			Cup		Continental		Other		Total	
Club	Season	Division	Apps	Goals	Apps	Goals	Apps	Goals	Apps	Goals	Apps	Goals
Atlas	2023–24	Liga MX	12	0	—		—		1 (Note: Appearances in Leagues Cup)	0	13	0
Atlas	2024–25	Liga MX	25	1	—		—		3	0	28	1
Atlas	2025–26	Liga MX	32	1	—		—		—		32	1
Atlas	2026–27	Liga MX	9	1	—		—		3	0	12	1
Career total			78	3	0	0	0	0	7	0	85	3
