= Rosie Allwood =

Jamaican sprinter (born 1952)

Personal information
- Born: 21 November 1952 (age 72) Boston Beach, Colony of Jamaica, British Empire

Sport
- Sport: Sprinting
- Event: 100 metres

Rose Allwood Morrison (born 21 November 1952) is a Jamaican sprinter. She competed in the 100 metres at the 1972, 1976 and the 1980 Summer Olympics.

Allwood competed in the AIAW for the Florida Gators track and field team. At the 1976 AIAW Outdoor Track and Field Championships, she finished 3rd in the 100 m behind Rosalyn Bryant and Evelyn Ashford.
