= 1969 South American Championships in Athletics – Results =

These are the results of the 1969 South American Championships in Athletics which took place at the Estadio Atahualpa in Quito, Ecuador, between 4 and 12 October.

== Men's results ==
=== 100 metres ===
Heats – 4 October

Rank	Heat	Name	Nationality	Time	Notes
1	1	Andrés Calonje	Argentina	10.5	Q
2	1	Jacobo Bucaram	Ecuador	10.5	Q
3	1	Roberto Lay Su	Peru	10.8	
4	1	Anani dos Santos	Brazil	10.8	
5	1	Héctor Thomas	Venezuela	10.8	
1	2	Iván Moreno	Chile	10.3	Q
2	2	Pedro Grajales	Colombia	10.4	Q
3	2	Admilson Chitarra	Brazil	10.4	
4	2	Miguel Villacres	Ecuador	10.9	
5	2	Elbio García	Uruguay	10.9	
1	3	Fernando Acevedo	Peru	10.2	Q
2	3	Carlos Ripoll	Argentina	10.5	Q
3	3	Einar Erlandsen	Chile	10.5	
4	3	Arquímedes Mina	Colombia	10.8	
5	3	Orlando Cubillán	Venezuela	10.8	

Final – 5 October

Rank	Name	Nationality	Time	Notes
1st place, gold medalist(s)	Iván Moreno	Chile	10.6	
2nd place, silver medalist(s)	Fernando Acevedo	Peru	10.6	
3rd place, bronze medalist(s)	Andrés Calonje	Argentina	10.7	
4	Pedro Grajales	Colombia	10.8	
5	Jacobo Bucaram	Ecuador	10.8	
6	Carlos Ripoll	Argentina	10.8	

=== 200 metres ===
Heats – 8 October

Rank	Heat	Name	Nationality	Time	Notes
1	1	Roberto Schaefer	Argentina	21.7	Q
2	1	Paulo Alcántara Pereira	Brazil	22.0	Q
3	1	Einar Erlandsen	Chile	22.0	
4	1	Julio Chia	Peru	22.4	
5	1	Miguel Villacrés	Ecuador	NT	
1	2	Iván Moreno	Chile	20.9	Q, =CR
2	2	Jacobo Bucaram	Ecuador	21.7	Q
3	2	Wenceslao Ferrín	Colombia	21.7	
4	2	Raúl Dome	Venezuela	21.9	
5	2	Paulo de Oliveira	Brazil	21.9	
1	3	Fernando Acevedo	Peru	20.8	Q
2	3	Andrés Calonje	Argentina	21.0	Q
3	3	Jimmy Sierra	Colombia	21.8	
4	3	Luis Kun	Uruguay	22.2	
5	3	Orlando Cubillán	Venezuela	22.2	

Final – 9 October

Rank	Name	Nationality	Time	Notes
1st place, gold medalist(s)	Iván Moreno	Chile	20.9	=CR
2nd place, silver medalist(s)	Fernando Acevedo	Peru	21.0	
3rd place, bronze medalist(s)	Andrés Calonje	Argentina	21.1	
4	Jacobo Bucaram	Ecuador	21.6	
5	Roberto Schaefer	Argentina	21.8	
6	Paulo Alcántara Pereira	Brazil	21.8	

=== 400 metres ===
Heats – 4 October

Rank	Heat	Name	Nationality	Time	Notes
1	1	Andrés Calonje	Argentina	48.1	Q
2	1	Jorge Vallecilla	Ecuador	48.5	Q
3	1	Juan Santiago Gordón	Chile	48.6	
4	1	Jorge Alemán	Peru	50.1	
5	1	Japoleão de Menezes	Brazil	53.2	
1	2	Raúl Dome	Venezuela	48.6	Q
2	2	Jimmy Sierra	Colombia	49.8	Q
3	2	Julio Vega	Argentina	50.0	
4	2	Luis Kun	Uruguay	51.0	
1	3	José Rabaça	Brazil	49.0	Q
2	3	Pedro Kromschroeder	Chile	49.4	Q
3	3	Jorge Almeida	Ecuador	50.6	
4	3	Ciro Valdés	Colombia	50.8	
5	3	Leonardo Salvarrey	Uruguay	50.8	

Final – 5 October

Rank	Name	Nationality	Time	Notes
1st place, gold medalist(s)	Andrés Calonje	Argentina	46.9	
2nd place, silver medalist(s)	Raúl Dome	Venezuela	47.6	
3rd place, bronze medalist(s)	José Rabaça	Brazil	47.9	
4	Pedro Kromschroeder	Chile	48.5	
5	Jorge Vallecilla	Ecuador	48.6	
6	Jimmy Sierra	Colombia	49.0	

=== 800 metres ===
Heats – 5 October

Rank	Heat	Name	Nationality	Time	Notes
1	1	Jorge Grosser	Chile	1:56.7	Q
2	1	Alfredo Muller	Argentina	1:57.7	Q
3	1	Alejandro Arroyo	Ecuador	1:57.9	
4	1	Laurean Cauyara	Colombia	1:58.4	
5	1	Ricardo Zavala	Peru	2:05.4	
1	2	Roberto Salmona	Chile	1:59.4	Q
2	2	Antônio Flores	Brazil	1:59.7	Q
3	2	Luis Flores	Ecuador	2:02.6	
4	2	José Luis Amatti	Argentina	2:07.2	
1	3	Darcy Pereira	Brazil	1:55.0	Q
2	3	Wilfredys León	Venezuela	1:55.7	Q
3	3	Hugo Burgos	Colombia	1:56.1	
4	3	David Sandoval	Peru	2:01.1	

Final – 8 October

Rank	Name	Nationality	Time	Notes
1st place, gold medalist(s)	Jorge Grosser	Chile	1:54.1	
2nd place, silver medalist(s)	Darcy Pereira	Brazil	1:55.5	
3rd place, bronze medalist(s)	Roberto Salmona	Chile	1:55.9	
4	Antônio Flores	Brazil	1:57.1	
5	Alfredo Muller	Argentina	1:59.6	
6	Wilfredys León	Venezuela	2:16.0	

=== 1500 metres ===
Heats – 9 October

Rank	Heat	Name	Nationality	Time	Notes
1	1	Jorge Grosser	Chile	4:05.7	Q
2	1	Atílio Alegre	Brazil	4:06.9	Q
3	1	Rafael Baracaldo	Colombia	4:07.5	Q
4	1	Héctor Mejía	Ecuador	4:07.6	Q
5	1	Francisco Vega	Peru	4:07.8	
6	1	Osvaldo Suárez	Argentina	4:13.8	
	1	David Sandoval	Peru	?	
	1	Wilfredys León	Venezuela	?	
1	2	Clelio Jacome	Ecuador	4:06.0	Q
2	2	Roberto Salmona	Chile	4:08.4	Q
3	2	Antônio Flores	Brazil	4:09.8	Q
4	2	Carlos Loto	Argentina	4:11.0	Q
5	2	Guillermo Martínez	Colombia	4:11.4	
6	2	José Valdivia	Peru	4:16.2	
	2	José Luís Souza	Brazil	?	

Final – 11 October

Rank	Name	Nationality	Time	Notes
1st place, gold medalist(s)	Jorge Grosser	Chile	4:04.7	
2nd place, silver medalist(s)	Roberto Salmona	Chile	4:06.5	
3rd place, bronze medalist(s)	Clelio Jacome	Ecuador	4:08.5	
4	Héctor Mejía	Ecuador	4:09.4	
5	Atílio Alegre	Brazil	4:10.2	
6	Antônio Flores	Brazil	4:11.0	
	Rafael Baracaldo	Colombia	?	
	Carlos Loto	Argentina	?	

=== 5000 metres ===
5 October

Rank	Name	Nationality	Time	Notes
1st place, gold medalist(s)	Víctor Mora	Colombia	15:36.6	
2nd place, silver medalist(s)	Clelio Jacome	Ecuador	15:41.4	
3rd place, bronze medalist(s)	José Ramírez	Chile	15:49.3	
4	Héctor Mejía	Ecuador	15:56.9	
5	Ezequiel Baeza	Chile	16:20.2	
6	Nazario Araújo	Argentina	16:26.8	

=== 10,000 metres ===
5 October

Rank	Name	Nationality	Time	Notes
1st place, gold medalist(s)	Víctor Mora	Colombia	32:27.2	
2nd place, silver medalist(s)	Mario Cutropia	Argentina	32:28.6	
3rd place, bronze medalist(s)	José Ramírez	Chile	32:41.0	
4	Gustavo Gutiérrez	Ecuador	33:12.6	
5	Germán Correa	Colombia	33:52.4	
6	Jorge Zurita	Ecuador	33:52.4	
8	Ezequiel Baeza	Chile	NT	
	Antônio Fernandes Filho	Brazil	?	
	Alfredo Alcázar	Peru	?	
	Abel Gutiérrez	Peru	?	
	Ulises Usuca	Uruguay	?	

=== Marathon ===
12 October

Rank	Name	Nationality	Time	Notes
1st place, gold medalist(s)	Pedro Cárdenas	Colombia	2:36:36	
2nd place, silver medalist(s)	José Ramírez	Chile	2:43:41	
3rd place, bronze medalist(s)	Mario Cutropia	Argentina	2:46:56	
4	Nazario Araújo	Argentina	2:50:09	
5	Ezequiel Baeza	Chile	2:51:03	
6	Jaime Silva	Ecuador	2:51:28	
	José Silva	Brazil	?	

=== 110 metres hurdles ===
Heats – 11 October

Rank	Heat	Name	Nationality	Time	Notes
1	1	Alfredo Deza	Peru	14.6	Q
2	1	Patricio Saavedra	Chile	14.6	Q
3	1	Márcio Lomónaco	Brazil	14.7	
4	1	Jesús Villegas	Colombia	15.0	
5	1	Jacobo Bucaram	Ecuador	15.2	
1	2	Juan Carlos Dyrzka	Argentina	14.8	Q
2	2	John Muñoz	Venezuela	15.3	Q
3	2	Wenceslao Ferrín	Colombia	15.6	
4	2	Alfredo Guzmán	Chile	17.5	
5	2	Elbio García	Uruguay	DNF	
1	3	Carlos Mossa	Brazil	14.6	Q
2	3	Enrique Rendón	Venezuela	14.9	Q
3	3	Miguel Perotti	Argentina	15.0	
4	3	Carlos Mendoza	Peru	16.0	
5	3	Eduardo Francesc	Ecuador	16.5	

Final – 12 October

Rank	Name	Nationality	Time	Notes
1st place, gold medalist(s)	Patricio Saavedra	Chile	14.6	
2nd place, silver medalist(s)	Alfredo Deza	Peru	14.6	
3rd place, bronze medalist(s)	Enrique Rendón	Venezuela	14.7	
4	Juan Carlos Dyrzka	Argentina	15.2	
5	Carlos Mossa	Brazil	15.2	
6	John Muñoz	Venezuela	15.4	

=== 400 metres hurdles ===
Heats – 8 October

Rank	Heat	Name	Nationality	Time	Notes
1	1	Juan Santiago Gordón	Chile	54.6	Q
2	1	Jorge Almeida	Ecuador	57.3	Q
3	1	Enrique Rendón	Venezuela	1:01.5	
1	2	Jorge Vallecilla	Ecuador	53.4	Q
2	2	Ruy da Costa	Brazil	54.2	Q
3	2	Leonardo Salvarrey	Uruguay	54.5	
4	2	Carlos López	Argentina	55.3	
1	3	Juan Carlos Dyrzka	Argentina	52.6	Q
2	3	Jurandir Ienne	Brazil	54.4	Q
3	3	Patricio Saavedra	Chile	58.8	

Final – 9 October

Rank	Name	Nationality	Time	Notes
1st place, gold medalist(s)	Juan Carlos Dyrzka	Argentina	52.0	
2nd place, silver medalist(s)	Jorge Vallecilla	Ecuador	52.7	
3rd place, bronze medalist(s)	Juan Santiago Gordón	Chile	52.8	
4	Jurandir Ienne	Brazil	53.6	
5	Ruy da Costa	Brazil	55.6	
6	Jorge Almeida	Ecuador	56.4	

=== 3000 metres steeplechase ===
12 October

Rank	Name	Nationality	Time	Notes
1st place, gold medalist(s)	Jorge Grosser	Chile	9:51.2	
2nd place, silver medalist(s)	Víctor Mora	Colombia	9:53.1	
3rd place, bronze medalist(s)	Rafael Baracaldo	Argentina	9:53.2	
4	Eduardo Córdoba	Ecuador	10:08.8	
5	Ulises Usuca	Uruguay	10:20.2	
6	Francisco Vega	Peru	10:24.8	
	Carlos Loto	Argentina	?	
	Anônio Nogueira	Brazil	?	
	Jorge Zurita	Ecuador	?	

=== 4 × 100 metres relay ===
12 October

Rank	Nation	Competitors	Time	Notes
1st place, gold medalist(s)	Colombia	Jimmy Sierra, Wenceslao Ferrín, Óscar Loboa, Pedro Grajales	40.2	CR
2nd place, silver medalist(s)	Peru	Fernando Acevedo, Jorge Alemán, Julio Chía, Roberto Lay Su	40.7	NR
3rd place, bronze medalist(s)	Chile	Einar Erlandsen, Iván Moreno, Patricio Saavedra, Juan Santiago Gordón	40.7	NR
4	Brazil	Wilson Branco, Admilson Chitarra, Paulo Alcántara Pereira, Anani dos Santos	40.8	
5	Argentina	Juan Carlos Dyrzka, Roberto Schaefer, Andrés Calonje, Roberto Linares	42.2	
6	Ecuador	Abdalá Bucaram, Fernando Bustamante, Miguel Villacres, Jacobo Bucaram	42.3	

=== 4 × 400 metres relay ===
12 October

Rank	Nation	Competitors	Time	Notes
1st place, gold medalist(s)	Argentina	Andrés Calonge, Juan Carlos Dyrzka, Carlos Bertotti, José Luis Amatti	3:12.3	CR
2nd place, silver medalist(s)	Brazil	José Rabaca, Darcy Pereira, Napoleão Menezes, Juradir Ienne	3:13.2	
3rd place, bronze medalist(s)	Peru	Fernando Acevedo, Jorge Alemán, Rosales, Alfredo Deza	3:13.7	
4	Chile	Jorge Grosser, Juan Santiago Gordón, Iván Moreno, Pedro Kromschroeder	3:13.9	
5	Colombia	Fabio Zuñiga, Hugo Burgos, Jimmy Sierra, Pedro Grajales	3:16.0	
6	Ecuador	Alejandro Arroyo, Raúl Chevasco, Jorge Vallecilla, Jorge Almeida	3:20.4	

=== High jump ===
12 October

Rank	Name	Nationality	Result	Notes
1st place, gold medalist(s)	Luis Arbulú	Peru	2.00	=CR
2nd place, silver medalist(s)	Luis Barrionuevo	Argentina	1.95	
2nd place, silver medalist(s)	José Ernesto Dalmastro	Argentina	1.95	
4	Patricio Labán	Chile	1.95	
5	Oscar Canqui	Peru	1.95	
6	Juan Berger	Uruguay	1.90	

=== Pole vault ===
12 October

Rank	Name	Nationality	Result	Notes
1st place, gold medalist(s)	Daniel Argoitía	Argentina	4.40	CR
2nd place, silver medalist(s)	Ciro Valdés	Colombia	4.10	
3rd place, bronze medalist(s)	Augusto León Piqueras	Peru	3.70	
4	Cezar Kassab	Brazil	3.50	
5	Álvaro Chiriboga	Ecuador	3.40	
6	Arno Lagies	Chile	3.20	

=== Long jump ===
5 October

Rank	Name	Nationality	Result	Notes
1st place, gold medalist(s)	Admilson Chitarra	Brazil	7.60	CR
2nd place, silver medalist(s)	Iván Moreno	Chile	7.54	
3rd place, bronze medalist(s)	Eduardo Labalta	Argentina	7.21	
4	Enrique Naranjo	Chile	7.00	
5	Nelson Prudêncio	Brazil	7.00	
6	Alfredo Boncagni	Argentina	6.96	

=== Triple jump ===
4 October

Rank	Name	Nationality	Result	Notes
1st place, gold medalist(s)	Nelson Prudêncio	Brazil	16.34	CR
2nd place, silver medalist(s)	Joel Dias	Brazil	14.80	
3rd place, bronze medalist(s)	Ariel González	Argentina	14.65	
4	Manuel Gutiérrez	Colombia	14.48	
5	Jaime Pautt	Colombia	14.35	
6	Roberto dos Santos	Uruguay	14.30	

=== Shot put ===
4 October

Rank	Name	Nationality	Result	Notes
1st place, gold medalist(s)	José Carlos Jacques	Brazil	16.88	CR
2nd place, silver medalist(s)	Mario Peretti	Argentina	15.65	
3rd place, bronze medalist(s)	Juan Adolfo Turri	Argentina	15.64	
4	Cláudio Baeta	Brazil	15.39	
5	Dagoberto González	Colombia	14.63	
6	Luis Bustamante	Chile	14.56	

=== Discus throw ===
5 October

Rank	Name	Nationality	Result	Notes
1st place, gold medalist(s)	Dagoberto González	Colombia	51.66	
2nd place, silver medalist(s)	José Carlos Jacques	Brazil	50.88	
3rd place, bronze medalist(s)	Gustavo Gutiérrez	Colombia	50.64	
4	Hugo Bassetti	Argentina	45.78	
5	Cláudio Romanini	Brazil	45.76	
6	Mario Peretti	Argentina	42.24	

=== Hammer throw ===
11 October

Rank	Name	Nationality	Result	Notes
1st place, gold medalist(s)	José Alberto Vallejo	Argentina	61.58	AR
2nd place, silver medalist(s)	Celso Moraes	Brazil	56.50	
3rd place, bronze medalist(s)	Darwin Piñeyrúa	Uruguay	56.48	
4	Clovis da Silva	Brazil	53.60	
5	Carlos Gatica	Argentina	53.00	
6	Carlos Mencheli	Peru	52.18	

=== Javelin throw ===
12 October – Old model

Rank	Name	Nationality	Result	Notes
1st place, gold medalist(s)	Rolf Hoppe	Chile	69.76	CR
2nd place, silver medalist(s)	Paulo de Faría	Brazil	63.50	
3rd place, bronze medalist(s)	Jorge Peña	Chile	62.98	
4	Dante Yorges	Peru	61.54	
5	Ricardo Héber	Argentina	61.12	
6	Héctor Castro	Peru	59.56	

=== Decathlon ===
8–9 October – 1962 tables (1985 conversions given with *)

The highest mark recorded in each event is highlighted in yellow

Rank	Athlete	Nationality	100m	LJ	SP	HJ	400m	110m H	DT	PV	JT	1500m	Points	Conv.	Notes
1st place, gold medalist(s)	Héctor Thomas	Venezuela	10.9	6.95	13.80	1.70	54.2	15.9	38.22	4.00	59.00	6:00.7	6679	6464*	
2nd place, silver medalist(s)	Paulo Matschinske	Brazil	11.2	6.01	13.20	1.74	52.7	15.9	35.94	2.94	49.38	5:26.8	6124	5933*	
3rd place, bronze medalist(s)	Arno Lagies	Chile	11.3	6.68	11.18	1.65	52.1	15.7	30.92	3.34	38.26	5:21.4	5948	5782*	
4	Rodolfo Valgoni	Argentina	11.6	6.50	12.40	1.78	57.7	16.5	38.20	2.94	44.04	5:48.7	5768	5546*	
5	Héctor Rivas	Argentina	11.7	6.62	10.10	1.78	52.2	17.6	31.68	3.34	40.52	5:39.3	5695	5484*	
6	Jorge Rissi	Peru	11.1	6.12	10.34	1.82	54.9	17.0	33.88	2.70	42.46	5:54.9	5540	5335*	
7	Roberto dos Santos	Uruguay	11.9	6.20	9.80	1.76	52.5	16.5	31.64	2.80	35.20	5:14.5	5466	5328*	
	Werner Klotzer	Chile	11.7	5.83	11.30	1.45	?	–	–	–	–	–	DNF	DNF	
	Leonardo Astudillo	Ecuador	11.4	5.92	9.12	?	–	–	–	–	–	–	DNF	DNF	
	Valdir Barbanti	Brazil	11.4	?	–	–	–	–	–	–	–	–	DNF	DNF	

== Women's results ==
=== 100 metres ===
Heats – 8 October

Rank	Heat	Name	Nationality	Time	Notes
1	1	Josefa Vicent	Uruguay	11.9	Q
2	1	María Luisa Vilca	Peru	12.2	Q
3	1	Liliana Cragno	Argentina	12.3	Q
4	1	Gloria Ferraz	Brazil	12.6	
5	1	Gloria González	Chile	12.6	
6	1	Elsy Rivas	Colombia	12.9	
1	2	Silvina Pereira	Brazil	11.7	Q CR
2	2	Silvana Lasso	Ecuador	12.4	Q
3	2	Juana Mosquera	Colombia	12.5	Q
4	2	Cristina Filgueira	Argentina	12.5	
5	2	Sara Montecinos	Chile	12.7	

Final – 9 October

Rank	Name	Nationality	Time	Notes
1st place, gold medalist(s)	Silvina Pereira	Brazil	11.7	=CR
2nd place, silver medalist(s)	Josefa Vicent	Uruguay	11.9	
3rd place, bronze medalist(s)	María Luisa Vilca	Peru	12.3	
4	Liliana Cragno	Argentina	12.4	
5	Juana Mosquera	Colombia	12.5	
6	Silvana Lasso	Ecuador	12.6	

=== 200 metres ===
Heats – 4 October

Rank	Heat	Name	Nationality	Time	Notes
1	1	Silvina Pereira	Brazil	23.9	Q, AR
2	1	Silvana Lasso	Ecuador	25.0	Q
3	1	Cristina Irurzun	Argentina	25.4	
4	1	Elsy Rivas	Colombia	26.0	
5	1	Bertha Arce	Peru	26.3	
1	2	Josefa Vicent	Uruguay	24.9	Q
2	2	Juana Mosquera	Colombia	25.1	Q
3	2	Marlene Campos	Brazil	25.4	
4	2	Aurora Sáenz	Chile	26.0	
1	3	Cristina Filgueira	Argentina	24.9	Q
2	3	María Luisa Vilca	Peru	25.3	Q
3	3	Gloria González	Chile	25.6	

Final – 5 October

Rank	Name	Nationality	Time	Notes
1st place, gold medalist(s)	Silvina Pereira	Brazil	24.0	
2nd place, silver medalist(s)	Josefa Vicent	Uruguay	24.6	NR
3rd place, bronze medalist(s)	Cristina Filgueira	Argentina	25.0	
4	María Luisa Vilca	Peru	25.4	
5	Silvana Lasso	Ecuador	25.4	
6	Juana Mosquera	Colombia	25.4	

=== 400 metres ===
11 October

Rank	Name	Nationality	Time	Notes
1st place, gold medalist(s)	Josefa Vicent	Uruguay	56.1	CR
2nd place, silver medalist(s)	Melania Fontanarrosa	Argentina	57.4	
3rd place, bronze medalist(s)	Cristina Filgueira	Argentina	57.5	
4	Gloria González	Chile	57.6	
5	Marlene Campos	Brazil	58.3	
6	Terezinha Ugayama	Brazil	1:01.2	

=== 800 metres ===
12 October

Rank	Name	Nationality	Time	Notes
1st place, gold medalist(s)	Melania Fontanarrosa	Argentina	2:17.8	
2nd place, silver medalist(s)	Iris Fernández	Argentina	2:18.4	
3rd place, bronze medalist(s)	Lourdes Vega	Ecuador	2:32.3	
4	Terezinha Ugayama	Brazil	2:36.8	
5	Fabiola Quiñónez	Ecuador	2:50.1	
	Dora González	Chile	DQ	

=== 80 metres hurdles ===
Heats – 4 October

Rank	Heat	Name	Nationality	Time	Notes
1	1	Ana Udini	Uruguay	11.5	Q
2	1	Ana Akiko Omote	Brazil	11.6	Q
3	1	Graciela Paviotti	Argentina	11.6	Q
4	1	Elvira Quiñónez	Ecuador	12.2	
5	1	Edith Noeding	Peru	12.2	
1	2	Carlota Ulloa	Chile	11.0	Q, AR
2	2	Alicia Barrera	Peru	11.7	Q
3	2	Gloria Ferraz	Brazil	12.0	Q
	2	Emilia Dyrzka	Argentina	DNF	

Final – 5 October

Rank	Name	Nationality	Time	Notes
1st place, gold medalist(s)	Carlota Ulloa	Chile	11.0	=AR
2nd place, silver medalist(s)	Graciela Paviotti	Argentina	11.4	
3rd place, bronze medalist(s)	Ana Udini	Uruguay	11.4	
4	Ana Akiko Omote	Brazil	11.6	
5	Alicia Barrera	Peru	11.6	
6	Gloria Ferraz	Brazil	11.9	

=== 4 × 100 metres relay ===
12 October

Rank	Nation	Competitors	Time	Notes
1st place, gold medalist(s)	Brazil	Silvina Pereira, Elisabeth Nunes, Aída dos Santos, Gloria Ferraz	46.0	AR
2nd place, silver medalist(s)	Argentina	Liliana Cragno, Cristina Filgueira, Alicia Kaufmanas, Alicia Masuccio	47.0	
3rd place, bronze medalist(s)	Chile	Silvia Kinzel, Gloria González, Sara Montecinos, Aurora Sáenz	48.6	
4	Peru	Alicia Barrera, Edith Noeding, Bertha Arce, María Luisa Vilca	48.6	
5	Ecuador	Alba Maldonado, Cristina Infante, Elvira Quiñónez, Silvana Lasso	49.0	
6	Colombia	Juana Mosquera, Elsy Rivas, Amparo Bravo, Flor Umaña	50.7	

=== High jump ===
5 October

Rank	Name	Nationality	Result	Notes
1st place, gold medalist(s)	Maria Cipriano	Brazil	1.70	CR
2nd place, silver medalist(s)	Aída dos Santos	Brazil	1.60	
3rd place, bronze medalist(s)	Patricia Mantero	Peru	1.55	
3rd place, bronze medalist(s)	Ana Udini	Uruguay	1.55	
5	Patricia Miranda	Chile	1.50	
6	Lila Negro	Argentina	1.50	
6	Cecilia Godard	Chile	1.50	

=== Long jump ===
9 October

Rank	Name	Nationality	Result	Notes
1st place, gold medalist(s)	Silvina Pereira	Brazil	5.85	
2nd place, silver medalist(s)	Alicia Kaufmanas	Argentina	5.70	
3rd place, bronze medalist(s)	Ana Akiko Omote	Brazil	5.61	
4	Silvia Kinzel	Chile	5.59	
5	Carlota Ulloa	Chile	5.58	
6	Cristina Infante	Ecuador	5.56	

=== Shot put ===
9 October

Rank	Name	Nationality	Result	Notes
1st place, gold medalist(s)	Rosa Molina	Chile	13.30	
2nd place, silver medalist(s)	Neide Gomes	Brazil	13.02	
3rd place, bronze medalist(s)	Maria Boso	Brazil	12.68	
4	Delia Vera	Peru	12.12	
5	Gladys Ortega	Argentina	11.90	
6	Ana María Mellado	Chile	11.62	
7	Irma Pérez	Argentina	11.25	

=== Discus throw ===
4 October

Rank	Name	Nationality	Result	Notes
1st place, gold medalist(s)	Odete Domingos	Brazil	42.92	
2nd place, silver medalist(s)	Gladys Ortega	Argentina	41.92	
3rd place, bronze medalist(s)	Isolina Vergara	Colombia	40.48	
4	Patricia Mora	Chile	39.66	
5	Pradelia Delgado	Chile	38.12	
6	Maria Boso	Brazil	35.34	

=== Javelin throw ===
5 October – Old model

Rank	Name	Nationality	Result	Notes
1st place, gold medalist(s)	Rosa Molina	Chile	45.52	
2nd place, silver medalist(s)	Flor Umaña	Colombia	43.74	
3rd place, bronze medalist(s)	Kiyomi Nakagawa	Brazil	41.02	
4	Delia Vera	Peru	38.50	
5	Aída dos Santos	Brazil	38.38	
6	María Esther Rollandi	Argentina	36.90	
7	Ana Julieta Scursoni	Argentina	36.14	

=== Pentathlon ===
11–12 October

The highest mark recorded in each event is highlighted in yellow.

Rank	Athlete	Nationality	100m H	SP	HJ	LJ	200m	Points	Notes
1st place, gold medalist(s)	Aída dos Santos	Brazil	12.1	11.86	1.65	5.05	24.9	4422	CR
2nd place, silver medalist(s)	Elisabeth Nunes	Brazil	12.1	11.43	1.50	5.49	26.1	4234	
3rd place, bronze medalist(s)	Carlota Ulloa	Chile	11.2	9.63	1.40	5.17	25.4	4107	
4	Ana Udini	Uruguay	11.5	9.81	1.52	5.34	27.5	4002	
5	Graciela Paviotti	Argentina	11.4	8.04	1.45	4.98	25.8	3926	
6	Cecilia Goddard	Chile	12.3	9.20	1.50	4.97	26.2	3907	
7	Angela Modón	Argentina	12.3	10.82	1.45	4.96	27.0	3926	
8	Elvira Quiñónez	Ecuador	12.3	9.20	1.50	4.38	26.7	3716	
9	Juana Mosquera	Colombia	13.4	8.77	1.40	4.62	25.0	3640	
10	Alicia Barrera	Peru	11.8	8.85	1.30	4.60	26.8	3570	
