= 1967 South American Championships in Athletics – Results =

These are the results of the 1967 South American Championships in Athletics which took place at the Pista de Atletismo Parque Chacabuco in Buenos Aires, Argentina, between 7 and 15 October.

== Men's results ==
=== 100 metres ===
Heats – 7 October
Wind:
Heat 1: -1.9 m/s, Heat 2: -1.4 m/s, Heat 3: -1.8 m/s, Heat 4: -2.0 m/s

Rank	Heat	Name	Nationality	Time	Notes
1	1	Roberto Quijada	Chile	11.1	Q
2	1	Juan Hasegawa	Peru	11.3	Q
3	1	Migdonio Palacios	Colombia	11.4	Q
4	1	Heber Cuello	Uruguay	11.4	
5	1	Modesto Rojas	Paraguay	11.8	
6	1	Jacobo Bucaram	Ecuador	11.9	
1	2	Anani Santos	Brazil	10.9	Q
2	2	Fernando Acevedo	Peru	10.9	Q
3	2	Einar Erlandsen	Chile	11.0	Q
4	2	Eduardo Satoyama	Argentina	11.0	
5	2	Óscar Ramírez	Paraguay	11.6	
1	3	Jaime Uribe	Colombia	11.0	Q
2	3	Roberto Schaefer	Argentina	11.1	Q
3	3	Affonso da Silva	Brazil	11.4	Q
4	3	Javier Calderón	Peru	11.4	
5	3	Enrique Freccero	Uruguay	11.4	
6	3	Enrique López	Paraguay	11.8	
1	4	Iván Moreno	Chile	10.7	Q
2	4	Raúl Sánchez	Colombia	11.1	Q
3	4	Roberto Linares	Argentina	11.2	Q
4	4	Admilson Chitarra	Brazil	11.2	
5	4	Mario Ortiz	Uruguay	11.5	

Semifinals – 7 October
Wind:
Heat 1: -1.0 m/s, Heat 2: -1.9 m/s

Rank	Heat	Name	Nationality	Time	Notes
1	1	Iván Moreno	Chile	10.9	Q
2	1	Raúl Sánchez	Colombia	10.9	Q
3	1	Jaime Uribe	Colombia	10.9	Q
4	1	Affonso da Silva	Brazil	10.9	
5	1	Juan Hasegawa	Peru	10.9	
6	1	Roberto Schaefer	Argentina	11.0	
1	2	Fernando Acevedo	Peru	10.8	Q
2	2	Anani Santos	Brazil	11.1	Q
3	2	Roberto Linares	Argentina	11.2	Q
4	2	Roberto Quijada	Chile	11.3	
5	2	Einar Erlandsen	Chile	11.3	
	2	Migdonio Palacios	Colombia	?	

Final – 8 October
Wind: +0.2 m/s

Rank	Name	Nationality	Time	Notes
1st place, gold medalist(s)	Iván Moreno	Chile	10.4	
2nd place, silver medalist(s)	Jaime Uribe	Colombia	10.5	
3rd place, bronze medalist(s)	Fernando Acevedo	Peru	10.5	
4	Raúl Sánchez	Colombia	10.5	
5	Roberto Linares	Argentina	10.7	
6	Anani Santos	Brazil	10.7	

=== 200 metres ===
Heats – 12 October
Wind:
Heat 1: +1.0 m/s, Heat 2: +1.9 m/s, Heat 3: +0.8 m/s, Heat 4: +2.1 m/s

Rank	Heat	Name	Nationality	Time	Notes
1	1	Fernando Acevedo	Peru	21.9	Q
2	1	Einar Erlandsen	Chile	22.4	Q
3	1	Roberto Linares	Argentina	22.5	Q
4	1	Miguel Villacres	Ecuador	22.5	
5	1	Gustavo Alzugaray	Uruguay	23.4	
1	2	Raúl Sánchez	Colombia	21.7	Q
2	2	Andrés Calonge	Argentina	21.9	Q
3	2	Roberto Quijada	Chile	22.4	Q
4	2	Joel Costa	Brazil	22.5	
5	2	Javier Calderón	Peru	22.6	
6	2	Julio Molina	Uruguay	23.4	
1	3	Iván Moreno	Chile	21.9	Q
2	3	Jaime Uribe	Colombia	22.1	Q
3	3	Anani Santos	Brazil	22.5	Q
4	3	Heber Cuello	Uruguay	23.0	
5	3	Alfredo Deza	Peru	23.2	
6	3	Modesto Rojas	Paraguay	23.9	
1	4	Pedro Grajales	Colombia	22.1	Q
2	4	Eduardo Satoyama	Argentina	22.2	Q
3	4	Ernan Eisele	Brazil	22.5	Q
4	4	Jorge Vallecilla	Ecuador	22.9	
5	4	Óscar Ramírez	Paraguay	23.2	

Semifinals – 12 October
Wind:
Heat 1: +0.6 m/s, Heat 2: +1.6 m/s

Rank	Heat	Name	Nationality	Time	Notes
1	1	Pedro Grajales	Colombia	21.2	Q
2	1	Raúl Sánchez	Colombia	21.7	Q
3	1	Anani Santos	Brazil	22.1	Q
4	1	Roberto Quijada	Chile	22.2	
5	1	Roberto Linares	Argentina	22.2	
6	1	Einar Erlandsen	Chile	22.4	
1	2	Andrés Calonge	Argentina	21.4	Q
2	2	Jaime Uribe	Colombia	21.4	Q
3	2	Iván Moreno	Chile	21.5	Q
4	2	Fernando Acevedo	Peru	21.5	
5	2	Eduardo Satoyama	Argentina	22.0	
6	2	Ernan Eisele	Brazil	22.4	

Final – 13 October
Wind: +0.9 m/s

Rank	Name	Nationality	Time	Notes
1st place, gold medalist(s)	Pedro Grajales	Colombia	20.9	=CR
2nd place, silver medalist(s)	Jaime Uribe	Colombia	21.2	
3rd place, bronze medalist(s)	Iván Moreno	Chile	21.3	
4	Raúl Sánchez	Colombia	21.4	
5	Andrés Calonge	Argentina	21.4	
6	Anani Santos	Brazil	21.9	

=== 400 metres ===
Heats – 7 October

Rank	Heat	Name	Nationality	Time	Notes
1	1	Jorge Alemán	Peru	49.3	Q
2	1	Andrés Calonge	Argentina	49.9	Q
3	1	Joel Rocha	Brazil	50.0	Q
4	1	Jorge Vallecilla	Ecuador	51.0	
5	1	Salomón Cáceres	Paraguay	52.0	
6	1	Luis Kun	Uruguay	52.3	
1	2	Carlos Álvarez	Colombia	49.4	Q
2	2	Leonardo Salvarrey	Uruguay	49.7	Q
3	2	Miguel Villacres	Ecuador	50.1	Q
4	2	Alfredo Sánchez	Argentina	50.3	
5	2	Roberto Salmona	Chile	51.5	
6	2	Milcíades Schupp	Paraguay	56.7	
1	3	Migdonio Palacios	Colombia	50.5	Q
2	3	Ernan Eisele	Brazil	50.6	Q
3	3	Jorge Arriaga	Peru	50.7	Q
4	3	Enrique Naranjo	Chile	50.8	
5	3	Gustavo Alzugaray	Uruguay	52.9	
6	3	Silvino Franco	Paraguay	56.7	
1	4	Pedro Grajales	Colombia	49.7	Q
2	4	Carlos Heuchert	Argentina	50.2	Q
3	4	Juan Santiago Gordón	Chile	50.2	Q
4	4	Jurandir Ienne	Brazil	50.4	
5	4	José Cavero	Peru	52.1	

Semifinals – 7 October

Rank	Heat	Name	Nationality	Time	Notes
1	1	Pedro Grajales	Colombia	47.5	Q
2	1	Jorge Alemán	Peru	48.6	Q
3	1	Juan Santiago Gordón	Chile	48.9	Q
4	1	Joel Rocha	Brazil	49.0	
5	1	Carlos Heuchert	Argentina	49.7	
6	1	Miguel Villacres	Ecuador	49.7	
1	2	Carlos Álvarez	Colombia	48.5	Q
2	2	Andrés Calonge	Argentina	48.6	Q
3	2	Ernan Eisele	Brazil	49.3	Q
4	2	Leonardo Salvarrey	Uruguay	49.4	
5	2	Migdonio Palacios	Colombia	50.4	
6	2	Jorge Arriaga	Peru	51.3	

Final – 8 October

Rank	Name	Nationality	Time	Notes
1st place, gold medalist(s)	Pedro Grajales	Colombia	46.4	CR
2nd place, silver medalist(s)	Carlos Álvarez	Colombia	47.0	
3rd place, bronze medalist(s)	Andrés Calonge	Argentina	47.5	
4	Ernan Eisele	Brazil	47.9	
5	Jorge Alemán	Peru	48.1	
6	Juan Santiago Gordón	Chile	48.4	

=== 800 metres ===
Heats – 12 October

Rank	Heat	Name	Nationality	Time	Notes
1	1	Carlos Álvarez	Colombia	1:56.3	Q
2	1	Luis Jara	Peru	1:56.4	Q
3	1	Atílio Alegre	Brazil	1:57.2	Q
4	1	Mario Fabris	Argentina	2:00.2	
5	1	Salomón Cáceres	Paraguay	2:01.6	
1	2	Homero Arce	Chile	1:56.9	Q
2	2	Alejandro Arroyo	Ecuador	1:57.4	Q
3	2	Jorge Arriaga	Peru	1:57.6	Q
4	2	Paulo de Araújo	Brazil	1:57.9	
5	2	Javier Castrillón	Colombia	1:58.4	
1	3	Jorge Grosser	Chile	1:58.2	Q
2	3	Carlos Heuchert	Argentina	2:00.1	Q
3	3	Clelio Jacome	Ecuador	2:01.3	Q
	3	José Valdivia	Peru	DQ	
1	4	Guillermo Cuello	Argentina	1:54.3	Q
2	4	Orlando Gutiérrez	Colombia	1:54.8	Q
3	4	José Luiz de Souza	Brazil	1:55.0	Q
4	4	Albertino Etchechury	Uruguay	1:55.4	
5	4	Roberto Salmona	Chile	1:55.6	

Semifinals – 13 October

Rank	Heat	Name	Nationality	Time	Notes
1	1	Guillermo Cuello	Argentina	1:54.0	Q
2	1	Carlos Álvarez	Colombia	1:54.3	Q
3	1	Homero Arce	Chile	1:54.4	Q
4	1	José Luiz de Souza	Brazil	1:54.4	
5	1	José Valdivia	Peru	NT	
6	1	Jorge Arriaga	Peru	NT	
1	2	Jorge Grosser	Chile	1:54.2	Q
2	2	Atílio Alegre	Brazil	1:54.8	Q
3	2	Alejandro Arroyo	Ecuador	1:54.9	Q
4	2	Carlos Heuchert	Argentina	1:54.9	
5	2	Orlando Gutiérrez	Colombia	NT	
6	2	Luis Jara	Peru	NT	

Final – 13 October

Rank	Name	Nationality	Time	Notes
1st place, gold medalist(s)	Jorge Grosser	Chile	1:51.6	
2nd place, silver medalist(s)	Guillermo Cuello	Argentina	1:52.0	
3rd place, bronze medalist(s)	Alejandro Arroyo	Ecuador	1:54.3	
4	Atílio Alegre	Brazil	1:55.4	
5	Homero Arce	Chile	1:59.0	
	Carlos Álvarez	Colombia	DQ	

=== 1500 metres ===
8 October

Rank	Name	Nationality	Time	Notes
1st place, gold medalist(s)	Jorge Grosser	Chile	3:52.2	
2nd place, silver medalist(s)	Hernando Gutiérrez	Colombia	3:55.7	
3rd place, bronze medalist(s)	Albertino Etchechury	Uruguay	3:56.8	
4	Alejandro Arroyo	Ecuador	3:59.9	
5	Homero Arce	Chile	4:00.3	
6	Guillermo Piccioni	Argentina	4:00.6	
6	Luis Alarcón	Chile	4:00.6	
	Ricardo Leguiza	Argentina	NT	
	Juan Carlos Ferriolo	Argentina	NT	
	Atílio Alegre	Brazil	NT	
	José Luiz de Souza	Brazil	NT	
	José Domingo Maia	Brazil	NT	
	Javier Castrillón	Colombia	NT	
	Víctor Mora	Colombia	NT	
	Clelio Jacome	Ecuador	NT	
	Salomón Cáceres	Paraguay	NT	
	José Valdivia	Peru	NT	
	Miguel Ramírez	Peru	NT	
	Eliseo Fierro	Uruguay	NT	

=== 5000 metres ===
8 October

Rank	Name	Nationality	Time	Notes
1st place, gold medalist(s)	Víctor Mora	Colombia	14:32.2	
2nd place, silver medalist(s)	Osvaldo Suárez	Argentina	14:48.0	
3rd place, bronze medalist(s)	Orides Alves	Brazil	14:50.0	
4	Luiz Caetano	Brazil	15:12.0	
5	Alberto Ríos	Argentina	15:17.2	
6	Gustavo Gutiérrez	Ecuador	15:23.8	
	Antonio Artaza	Argentina	NT	
	Isaac Oliveira	Brazil	NT	
	Manuel Rodríguez	Chile	NT	
	Enrique Padilla	Ecuador	NT	
	Julián Zacarías	Paraguay	NT	
	Albertino Etchechury	Uruguay	NT	
	Eliseo Fierro	Uruguay	NT	
	Ulises Usuca	Uruguay	DNF	

=== 10,000 metres ===
13 October

Rank	Name	Nationality	Time	Notes
1st place, gold medalist(s)	Osvaldo Suárez	Argentina	30:50.8	
2nd place, silver medalist(s)	Víctor Mora	Colombia	30:57.4	
3rd place, bronze medalist(s)	Orides Alves	Brazil	31:17.5	
4	Luiz Caetano	Brazil	32:27.6	
5	Ulises Usuca	Uruguay	32:35.8	
6	Gustavo Gutiérrez	Ecuador	32:42.4	
	Mario Cutropia	Argentina	NT	
	José Pereira	Argentina	NT	
	Irenal da Silva	Brazil	NT	
	Enrique Padilla	Ecuador	NT	
	Eliseo Fierro	Uruguay	NT	
	Norbertino Etchechury	Uruguay	NT	

=== Marathon ===
15 October

Rank	Name	Nationality	Time	Notes
1st place, gold medalist(s)	Armando González	Uruguay	2:35:43	CR
2nd place, silver medalist(s)	Luis Altamirano	Argentina	2:36:12	
3rd place, bronze medalist(s)	Agustín Calle	Colombia	2:39:27	
4	Ramón Reyes	Chile	2:44:18	
5	Alejandro Flores	Ecuador	2:45:13	
6	Benedito do Amaral	Brazil	2:48:58	
7	Jaime Silva	Ecuador	2:49:10	
8	Alfredo Aguirre	Argentina	2:52:34	
9	Darío Pereira	Brazil	2:54:39	
	Alejandro Mendoza	Peru	DNF	
	Gustavo Gutiérrez	Ecuador	DNF	
	David Miranda	Chile	DNF	
	João Batista do Carmo	Brazil	DNF	
	Alberto Ríos	Argentina	DNF	

=== 110 metres hurdles ===
Heats – 8 October
Wind:
Heat 1: +2.3 m/s, Heat 2: -1.0 m/s, Heat 3: -0.2 m/s Heat 4: +0.7 m/s

Rank	Heat	Name	Nationality	Time	Notes
1	1	Guaracy da Silva	Brazil	15.0	Q
2	1	Felipe Montero	Chile	15.4	Q
3	1	Rodolfo Díaz	Uruguay	15.9	Q
1	2	Elbio García	Uruguay	14.8	Q
2	2	Juan Carlos Dyrzka	Argentina	14.8	Q
3	2	Marcelo Moreno	Chile	15.7	Q
4	2	Roberto Abugattás	Peru	15.7	
5	2	Félix Francesc	Ecuador	16.2	
1	3	Alfredo Deza	Peru	14.9	Q
2	3	Miguel Perotti	Argentina	15.5	Q
3	3	Jurandir Ienne	Brazil	15.5	Q
4	3	Arno Lagies	Chile	16.2	
1	4	Carlos Mossa	Brazil	14.9	Q
2	4	Juan Carlos Kerwitz	Argentina	15.5	Q

Semifinals – 8 October
Wind:
Heat 1: 0.0 m/s, Heat 2: -0.8 m/s

Rank	Heat	Name	Nationality	Time	Notes
1	1	Carlos Mossa	Brazil	15.1	Q
2	1	Elbio García	Uruguay	15.2	Q
3	1	Felipe Montero	Chile	15.4	Q
4	1	Juan Carlos Kerwitz	Argentina	15.5	
5	1	Miguel Perotti	Argentina	15.7	
1	2	Juan Carlos Dyrzka	Argentina	15.0	Q
2	2	Alfredo Deza	Peru	15.0	Q
3	2	Guaracy da Silva	Brazil	15.3	Q
4	2	Jurandir Ienne	Brazil	15.3	
5	2	Marcelo Moreno	Chile	16.7	
6	2	Rodolfo Díaz	Uruguay	16.8	

Final – 12 October
Wind: +0.7 m/s

Rank	Name	Nationality	Time	Notes
1st place, gold medalist(s)	Alfredo Deza	Peru	14.5	=CR
2nd place, silver medalist(s)	Carlos Mossa	Brazil	14.7	
3rd place, bronze medalist(s)	Juan Carlos Dyrzka	Argentina	14.8	
4	Elbio García	Uruguay	15.2	
5	Felipe Montero	Chile	15.4	
6	Guaracy da Silva	Brazil	15.5	

=== 400 metres hurdles ===
Heats – 13 October

Rank	Heat	Name	Nationality	Time	Notes
1	1	Juan Santiago Gordón	Chile	53.9	Q
2	1	Leonardo Salvarrey	Uruguay	53.9	Q
3	1	Jurandir Ienne	Brazil	54.2	
4	1	Carlos López	Argentina	55.7	
5	1	José Cavero	Peru	55.8	
1	2	Guillermo Cuello	Argentina	53.9	Q
2	2	Guaracy da Silva	Brazil	55.0	Q
3	2	Arno Lagies	Chile	56.0	
4	2	Miguel Villacres	Ecuador	57.3	
1	3	Juan Carlos Dyrzka	Argentina	53.5	Q
2	3	Jorge Vallecilla	Ecuador	54.5	Q
3	3	Santiago Brumel	Chile	55.5	
4	3	Alberto de Oliveira	Brazil	58.3	

Final – 14 October

Rank	Name	Nationality	Time	Notes
1st place, gold medalist(s)	Juan Santiago Gordón	Chile	52.1	
2nd place, silver medalist(s)	Juan Carlos Dyrzka	Argentina	52.3	
3rd place, bronze medalist(s)	Guillermo Cuello	Argentina	53.3	PB
4	Leonardo Salvarrey	Uruguay	53.4	
5	Jorge Vallecilla	Ecuador	54.5	
6	Guaracy da Silva	Brazil	54.5	

=== 3000 metres steeplechase ===
14 October

Rank	Name	Nationality	Time	Notes
1st place, gold medalist(s)	Domingo Amaizón	Argentina	9:04.8	
2nd place, silver medalist(s)	Albertino Etchechury	Uruguay	9:16.0	
3rd place, bronze medalist(s)	Benedito do Amaral	Brazil	9:24.6	
4	Antonio Artaza	Argentina	9:25.8	
5	Sebastião Mendes	Brazil	9:28.2	
6	Alberto Ríos	Argentina	9:28.8	
	José Domingos Maia	Brazil	NT	
	Francisco Allen	Chile	NT	
	Luis Alarcón	Chile	NT	
	Manuel Rodríguez	Chile	NT	
	Enrique Padilla	Ecuador	NT	
	Clelio Jacome	Ecuador	NT	
	Miguel Ramírez	Peru	NT	
	Norbertino Etchechury	Uruguay	NT	
	Ulises Usuca	Uruguay	NT	

=== 4 × 100 metres relay ===
Heats – 13 October

Rank	Heat	Nation	Competitors	Time	Notes
1	1	Colombia	Raúl Sánchez, Jaime Uribe, Carlos Álvarez, Pedro Grajales	41.8	Q
2	1	Uruguay	Julio Molina, Heber Cuello, Enrique Freccero, Mario Ortiz	43.6	Q
3	1	Ecuador	Félix Francesc, Alejandro Arroyo, Jorge Vallecilla, Miguel Villacres	44.2	Q
4	1	Paraguay	Modesto Rojas, Óscar Ramírez, Silviino Franco, Enrique López	44.6	
1	2	Peru	Juan Hasegawa, Javier Calderón, Jorge Alemán, Fernando Acevedo	41.4	Q
2	2	Brazil	Admilson Chitarra, Affonso da Silva, Anani Santos, Joel Costa	41.7	Q
3	2	Chile	Jean Pierre Landon, Einar Erlandsen, Iván Moreno, Roberto Quijada	41.8	Q
4	2	Argentina	Eduardo Satoyama, Roberto Schaefer, Roberto Linares, Andrés Calonge	41.8	

Final – 14 October

Rank	Nation	Competitors	Time	Notes
1st place, gold medalist(s)	Colombia	Raúl Sánchez, Jaime Uribe, Carlos Álvarez, Pedro Grajales	41.1	
2nd place, silver medalist(s)	Chile	Jean Pierre Landon, Einar Erlandsen, Iván Moreno, Roberto Quijada	41.8	
3rd place, bronze medalist(s)	Brazil	Admilson Chitarra, Affonso da Silva, Anani Santos, Joel Costa	41.8	
4	Ecuador	Félix Francesc, Alejandro Arroyo, Jorge Vallecilla, Miguel Villacres	44.0	
	Peru	Juan Hasegawa, Javier Calderón, Jorge Alemán, Fernando Acevedo	DNF	
	Uruguay	Julio Molina, Heber Cuello, Enrique Freccero, Mario Ortiz	DQ	

=== 4 × 400 metres relay ===
Heats – 14 October

Rank	Heat	Nation	Competitors	Time	Notes
1	1	Colombia	Migdonio Palacios, Jaime Uribe, Carlos Álvarez, Pedro Grajales	3:24.0	Q
2	1	Brazil	Ernandi Eisle, Jurandir Ienne, Guaracy da Silva, Joel Rocha	3:24.4	Q
3	1	Chile	Juan Santiago Gordón, Enrique Naranjo, Iván Moreno, Jorge Grosser	3:24.7	Q
4	1	Paraguay	Enrique López, Silvino Franco, Óscar Ramírez, Salomón Cáceres	3:42.9	
1	2	Peru	Jorge Alemán, Jorge Arriaga, Julio Hurtado, Fernando Acevedo	3:17.3	Q
2	2	Argentina	Eduardo Satoyama, Alfredo Sánchez, Guillermo Cuello, Carlos Heuchert	3:17.4	Q
3	2	Ecuador	Alejandro Arroyo, Félix Francesc, Jorge Vallecilla, Miguel Villacres	3:22.9	Q
4	2	Uruguay	Enrique Freccero, Gustavo Alzugaray, Luis Kun, Leonardo Salvarrey	3:25.3	

Final – 15 October

Rank	Nation	Competitors	Time	Notes
1st place, gold medalist(s)	Colombia	Migdonio Palacios, Jaime Uribe, Carlos Álvarez, Pedro Grajales	3:14.7	
2nd place, silver medalist(s)	Peru	Jorge Alemán, Jorge Arriaga, Julio Hurtado, Fernando Acevedo	3:15.4	
3rd place, bronze medalist(s)	Brazil	Ernandi Eisle, Jurandir Ienne, Guaracy da Silva, Joel Rocha	3:15.7	
4	Argentina	Eduardo Satoyama, Alfredo Sánchez, Guillermo Cuello, Carlos Heuchert	3:18.1	
5	Ecuador	Alejandro Arroyo, Félix Francesc, Jorge Vallecilla, Miguel Villacres	3:30.0	
	Chile	Juan Santiago Gordón, Iván Moreno, Enrique Naranjo, Jorge Grosser	DQ	

=== High jump ===
13 October

Rank	Name	Nationality	Result	Notes
1st place, gold medalist(s)	Oscar Canqui	Peru	1.95	
2nd place, silver medalist(s)	Roberto Abugattás	Peru	1.95	
3rd place, bronze medalist(s)	Roberto Pozzi	Argentina	1.95	
4	José Ernesto Dalmastro	Argentina	1.90	
5	Eleuterio Fassi	Argentina	1.90	
6	Fernando Abugattás	Peru	1.90	
7	Juan Berger	Uruguay	1.90	
8	Patricio Laban	Chile	1.80	
8	Takashi Kurata	Brazil	1.80	
10	Gastón Ortiz	Uruguay	1.75	
11	Roberto dos Santos	Uruguay	1.75	
12	Hugo Frutos	Paraguay	1.70	

=== Pole vault ===
12 October

Rank	Name	Nationality	Result	Notes
1st place, gold medalist(s)	Erico Barney	Argentina	4.30	CR
2nd place, silver medalist(s)	César Quintero	Colombia	4.30	CR
3rd place, bronze medalist(s)	Ricardo Martens	Argentina	3.80	
4	Mauricio de Souza	Brazil	3.80	
5	Juan Daniel Argoitía	Argentina	3.80	
6	Bernabé Souza	Brazil	3.40	

=== Long jump ===
8 October

Rank	Name	Nationality	Result	Notes
1st place, gold medalist(s)	Iván Moreno	Chile	7.35	
2nd place, silver medalist(s)	Alfredo Boncagni	Argentina	7.28	
3rd place, bronze medalist(s)	Héctor Rivas	Argentina	6.94	
4	Noel Revello	Uruguay	6.94	
5	Nelson Prudêncio	Brazil	6.92	
6	Eduardo Babuglia	Uruguay	6.75	
7	René Cerdá	Argentina	6.55	
8	Carlos Mossa	Brazil	6.51	
9	Joel Costa	Brazil	6.39	
10	Enrique Naranjo	Chile	6.35	
11	José Gabriel Espínola	Paraguay	6.32	

=== Triple jump ===
13 October

Rank	Name	Nationality	Result	Notes
1st place, gold medalist(s)	Nelson Prudêncio	Brazil	16.30	CR
2nd place, silver medalist(s)	Wilson Beneman	Brazil	14.82	
3rd place, bronze medalist(s)	Joel Dias	Brazil	14.62	
4	Jorge Castillo	Argentina	14.14	
5	José Vuelta	Argentina	14.08	
6	Carlos Verasay	Argentina	13.92	
7	Félix Francesc	Ecuador	13.83	
8	Enrique Naranjo	Chile	13.26	
9	Roberto dos Santos	Uruguay	13.26	
10	Noel Revello	Uruguay	13.05	

=== Shot put ===
12 October

Rank	Name	Nationality	Result	Notes
1st place, gold medalist(s)	José Carlos Jacques	Brazil	16.59	CR
2nd place, silver medalist(s)	Mario Peretti	Argentina	15.52	
3rd place, bronze medalist(s)	Manuel Lechuga	Chile	14.73	
4	Álvaro Zucchi	Brazil	14.50	
5	Dagoberto González	Colombia	14.47	
6	Darwin Piñeyrúa	Uruguay	13.81	
7	Juan Bryce-Cottes	Peru	13.58	
8	Leonardo Kittsteiner	Chile	13.54	
9	José Alberto Vallejo	Argentina	13.31	
10	Enrique Pilarche	Argentina	12.64	
11	Lidio Crispieri	Chile	12.39	

=== Discus throw ===
14 October

Rank	Name	Nationality	Result	Notes
1st place, gold medalist(s)	Dagoberto González	Colombia	54.00	CR
2nd place, silver medalist(s)	José Carlos Jacques	Brazil	49.10	
3rd place, bronze medalist(s)	Juan José Báez	Argentina	46.84	
4	Walter Morandi	Uruguay	44.94	
5	Hugo Bassetti	Argentina	44.70	
6	Manuel Lechuga	Chile	44.28	
7	Norberto Viozzi	Argentina	42.74	
8	Arthur Palma	Brazil	38.42	
9	Álvaro Zucchi	Brazil	37.50	
10	Darwin Piñeyrúa	Uruguay	35.62	

=== Hammer throw ===
8 October

Rank	Name	Nationality	Result	Notes
1st place, gold medalist(s)	José Alberto Vallejo	Argentina	58.84	CR
2nd place, silver medalist(s)	Roberto Chapchap	Brazil	55.08	
3rd place, bronze medalist(s)	Lido Crispieri	Chile	52.76	
4	Darwin Piñeyrúa	Uruguay	52.52	
5	Alberto Corvatta	Argentina	50.70	
6	Marceliano Borrero	Colombia	50.38	
7	Aníbal González	Argentina	49.62	
8	Orlando Melo	Brazil	49.62	
9	Celso de Moraes	Brazil	48.62	
10	Carlos Mencheli	Peru	47.52	
11	Orlando Guaita	Chile	43.32	

=== Javelin throw ===
7 October – Old model

Rank	Name	Nationality	Result	Notes
1st place, gold medalist(s)	Álvaro Zucchi	Brazil	66.54	
2nd place, silver medalist(s)	Ian Barney	Argentina	63.20	
3rd place, bronze medalist(s)	Rafael Difonzo	Argentina	61.92	
4	Leonardo Kittsteiner	Chile	60.32	
5	Paulo de Faria	Brazil	60.20	
6	Dante Yorges	Peru	57.84	
7	Rolf Hoppe	Chile	56.50	
8	Rubén Coderch	Argentina	46.76	

=== Decathlon ===
14–15 October – 1962 tables (1985 conversions given with *)

The highest mark recorded in each event is highlighted in yellow

Rank	Athlete	Nationality	100m	LJ	SP	HJ	400m	110m H	DT	PV	JT	1500m	Points	Conv.	Notes
1st place, gold medalist(s)	Juan Carlos Kerwitz	Argentina	11.7	6.28	10.92	1.65	52.0	16.2	34.76	3.30	44.92	4:42.3	6093	5900*	
2nd place, silver medalist(s)	Arthur Palma	Brazil	11.9	6.02	11.98	1.70	52.3	16.3	35.76	3.30	38.68	4:36.2	6051	5955*	
3rd place, bronze medalist(s)	José Carlos Jacques	Brazil	11.5	5.79	16.02	1.55	51.5	17.7	48.12	2.30	45.48	4:52.6	6042	5949*	
4	Barnabé Souza	Brazil	11.6	6.40	11.41	1.70	53.3	16.1	28.06	3.60	37.92	4:41.7	6014	5848*	
5	Baby da Silva	Uruguay	11.7	6.47	10.29	1.65	53.2	17.7	29.14	3.40	37.80	5:03.2	5595	5414*	
6	Rodolfo Díaz	Uruguay	11.6	5.15	11.24	1.60	52.8	16.6	33.04	3.50	37.96	5:01.8	5566	5412*	
7	Arno Lagies	Chile	11.6	6.19	10.12	1.60	52.0	16.7	27.00	3.00	35.84	5:02.8	5430	5307*	
8	Dante Yorges	Peru	12.2	6.27	10.01	1.53	55.7	19.2	32.76	3.20	58.10	5:06.8	5396	5225*	
9	Néstor Bucetta	Argentina	11.6	5.87	11.78	1.60	54.7	16.7	33.40	2.40	40.88	5:26.0	5284	5161*	
10	Oscar Canqui	Peru	12.0	5.70	9.70	1.90	59.3	19.0	29.04	2.40	42.88	5:23.7	4902	4735*	
11	Marcos Escribas	Argentina	11.2	5.85	8.59	1.60	52.2	16.8	24.40	NM	33.94	4:56.7	4727	4804*	
	Carlos Zabala	Paraguay	11.9	5.83	9.60	1.70	61.7	19.0	25.70	3.30	36.84	DNS	DNF	–	
	Marcelo Moreno	Chile	11.0	6.51	8.43	1.60	54.5	16.4	22.64	?	–	–	DNF	–	
	Roberto Abugattás	Peru	11.6	5.88	9.92	1.90	58.3	?	–	–	–	–	DNF	–	
	César Garcete	Paraguay	12.3	?	–	–	–	–	–	–	–	–	DNF	–	

== Women's results ==
=== 100 metres ===
Heats – 7 October
Wind:
Heat 1: -2.2 m/s, Heat 2: -1.8 m/s, Heat 3: -1.2 m/s

Rank	Heat	Name	Nationality	Time	Notes
1	1	Silvina Pereira	Brazil	12.3	Q
2	1	Alicia Kaufmanas	Argentina	12.6	Q
3	1	Victoria Roa	Chile	12.7	
4	1	Rocío Gallo	Colombia	13.0	
5	1	Raquel Amaro	Uruguay	NT	
1	2	Liliana Cragno	Argentina	12.7	Q
2	2	Maria Cipriano	Brazil	12.9	Q
3	2	María Luisa Vilca	Peru	12.9	
4	2	Alicia Gogluska	Uruguay	13.1	
5	2	Mabel Camprubí	Chile	13.1	
1	3	Irenice Rodrigues	Brazil	12.5	Q
2	3	María Cristina Ducci	Chile	12.5	Q
3	3	Josefa Vicent	Uruguay	12.5	
4	3	Graciela Pinto	Argentina	12.9	
5	3	Alicia Barrera	Peru	13.3	

Final – 8 October
Wind:
+0.7 m/s

Rank	Name	Nationality	Time	Notes
1st place, gold medalist(s)	Silvina Pereira	Brazil	11.8	CR
2nd place, silver medalist(s)	Irenice Rodrigues	Brazil	12.0	
3rd place, bronze medalist(s)	María Cristina Ducci	Chile	12.1	
4	Alicia Kaufmanas	Argentina	12.4	
5	Maria Cipriano	Brazil	12.4	
6	Liliana Cragno	Argentina	12.4	

=== 200 metres ===
Heats – 12 October
Wind:
Heat 1: +0.9 m/s, Heat 2: -1.0 m/s, Heat 3: +3.7 m/s

Rank	Heat	Name	Nationality	Time	Notes
1	1	Silvina Pereira	Brazil	25.1	Q
2	1	Victoria Roa	Chile	25.8	Q
3	1	María Luisa Vilca	Peru	26.1	
4	1	Cristina Irurzun	Argentina	26.2	
1	2	Irenice Rodrigues	Brazil	25.4	Q
2	2	Graciela Pinto	Argentina	26.0	Q
3	2	Gloria González	Chile	26.3	
4	2	Alicia Gogluska	Uruguay	26.6	
5	2	Rocío Gallo	Colombia	26.7	
1	3	María Cristina Ducci	Chile	25.0	Q
2	3	Josefa Vicent	Uruguay	25.2	Q
3	3	Aída dos Santos	Brazil	25.7	
4	3	Berta Arce	Peru	26.8	

Final – 13 October
Wind:
+1.6 m/s

Rank	Name	Nationality	Time	Notes
1st place, gold medalist(s)	Silvina Pereira	Brazil	24.5	
2nd place, silver medalist(s)	Irenice Rodrigues	Brazil	24.8	
3rd place, bronze medalist(s)	María Cristina Ducci	Chile	25.0	
4	Josefa Vicent	Uruguay	25.2	
5	Victoria Roa	Chile	25.4	
6	Graciela Pinto	Argentina	26.1	

=== 800 metres ===
14 October

Rank	Name	Nationality	Time	Notes
1st place, gold medalist(s)	Sonia Oyé	Chile	2:16.9	CR
2nd place, silver medalist(s)	Alicia Enríquez	Argentina	2:17.7	
3rd place, bronze medalist(s)	Dora González	Chile	2:26.1	
4	Iris Fernández	Argentina	2:26.6	
5	Katty Benavídes	Chile	2:28.5	
6	Ana Freuler	Argentina	2:33.5	

=== 80 metres hurdles ===
Heats – 14 October
Wind:
Heat 1: -1.8 m/s, Heat 2: -2.2 m/s

Rank	Heat	Name	Nationality	Time	Notes
1	1	Leda dos Santos	Brazil	12.6	Q
2	1	Ana María Michelini	Argentina	12.6	Q
3	1	Nélida Ormeño	Chile	12.8	Q
4	1	Sofía Módica	Argentina	13.1	
5	1	Marisa Mederos	Uruguay	13.4	
	1	Wanda dos Santos	Brazil	DNF	
1	2	Carlota Ulloa	Chile	12.0	Q
2	2	Adilia do Rosário	Brazil	12.0	Q
3	2	Ana Udini	Uruguay	12.3	Q
4	2	Alicia Barrera	Peru	12.4	
5	2	Alicia Cantarini	Argentina	12.5	

Final – 15 October
Wind:
NWI

Rank	Name	Nationality	Time	Notes
1st place, gold medalist(s)	Carlota Ulloa	Chile	12.0	
2nd place, silver medalist(s)	Adilia do Rosário	Brazil	12.1	
3rd place, bronze medalist(s)	Leda dos Santos	Brazil	12.3	
4	Ana Udini	Uruguay	12.4	
5	Ana María Michelini	Argentina	12.5	
	Nélida Ormeño	Chile	DNF	

=== 4 × 100 metres relay ===
15 October

Rank	Nation	Competitors	Time	Notes
1st place, gold medalist(s)	Brazil	Silvina Pereira, Aída dos Santos, Maria Cipriano, Irenice Rodrigues	48.2	
2nd place, silver medalist(s)	Uruguay	Josefa Vicent, Alicia Gogluska, Dinorah González, Raquel Amaro	48.5	
3rd place, bronze medalist(s)	Argentina	Alicia Masuccio, Graciela Pinto, Alicia Kaufmanas, Liliana Cragno	48.5	
4	Chile	Gloria González, María Cristina Ducci, Carlota Ulloa, Victoria Roa	48.5	
	Peru	Berta Arce, María Luisa Vilca, Alicia Barrera, Delia Vera	DQ	

=== High jump ===
14 October

Rank	Name	Nationality	Result	Notes
1st place, gold medalist(s)	Maria Cipriano	Brazil	1.66	
2nd place, silver medalist(s)	Aída dos Santos	Brazil	1.60	
3rd place, bronze medalist(s)	Patricia Miranda	Chile	1.55	
4	Patricia Mantero	Peru	1.55	
5	Irenice Rodrigues	Brazil	1.50	
6	Marisa Mederos	Uruguay	1.50	
7	Lila Negro	Argentina	1.50	
8	Gerda Reichard	Chile	1.50	
9	María Cristina Falacara	Argentina	1.50	
10	Graciela Paviotti	Argentina	1.45	
10	Teresa Batista	Uruguay	1.45	
12	Dinorah González	Uruguay	1.45	
13	Cecilia Goddard	Chile	1.45	

=== Long jump ===
14 October

Rank	Name	Nationality	Result	Notes
1st place, gold medalist(s)	Irenice Rodrigues	Brazil	5.97	CR
2nd place, silver medalist(s)	Alicia Kaufmanas	Argentina	5.90	
3rd place, bronze medalist(s)	Dinorah González	Uruguay	5.73	
4	Silvina Pereira	Brazil	5.54	
5	Patricia Miranda	Chile	5.49	
6	Liliana Cragno	Argentina	5.45	
7	Neusa Nakatsukasa	Brazil	5.35	
8	María Cristina Falacara	Argentina	5.16	
9	Graciela Tasende	Uruguay	5.14	
10	Cecilia Goddard	Chile	5.04	
11	Cristina Infante	Ecuador	4.94	
12	Ana Udini	Uruguay	4.88	

=== Shot put ===
7 October

Rank	Name	Nationality	Result	Notes
1st place, gold medalist(s)	Rosa Molina	Chile	14.26	AR
2nd place, silver medalist(s)	Norma Suárez	Argentina	14.14	
3rd place, bronze medalist(s)	Neide Gomes	Brazil	11.97	
4	Eliana Bahamondes	Chile	11.92	
5	Maria de Lourdes Conceicão	Brazil	11.74	
6	Delia Vera	Peru	11.61	
7	María Amaison	Argentina	11.52	
8	Pradelia Delgado	Chile	10.69	
9	Odete Domingos	Brazil	10.47	
10	Victoria Cordeiro	Argentina	9.96	

=== Discus throw ===
13 October

Rank	Name	Nationality	Result	Notes
1st place, gold medalist(s)	Odete Domingos	Brazil	40.48	
2nd place, silver medalist(s)	Pradelia Delgado	Chile	38.80	
3rd place, bronze medalist(s)	María Amaison	Argentina	36.24	
4	María de Lourdes Conceicão	Brazil	35.72	
5	Ingeborg Mello	Argentina	35.38	
6	Inés Nieto	Argentina	34.86	
7	Patricia Mora	Chile	34.62	
8	Neide Gomes	Brazil	33.82	
9	Eliana Bahamondes	Chile	32.34	

=== Javelin throw ===
15 October – Old model

Rank	Name	Nationality	Result	Notes
1st place, gold medalist(s)	Kiyomi Nakagawa	Brazil	40.30	
2nd place, silver medalist(s)	Rosa Molina	Chile	39.16	
3rd place, bronze medalist(s)	Smeliana Dezulovic	Chile	37.90	
4	Helena Albrecht	Brazil	36.82	
5	Flor Umaña	Colombia	36.62	
6	Elsa Feres	Chile	34.34	
7	Delia Vera	Peru	33.34	
8	Aída dos Santos	Brazil	33.24	
9	Magdalena García	Argentina	32.10	
10	Ramona Sánchez	Argentina	30.04	
11	Ana Julieta Scursoni	Argentina	28.80	
