= Abugattás =

Abugattás is a surname. Notable people with the surname include:

- Daniel Abugattás (1955–2025), Peruvian businessman and politician
- Fernando Abugattás (born 1948), Peruvian high jumper
- Roberto Abugattás (1943–2024), Peruvian high jumper
