= Athletics at the 1970 Bolivarian Games =

Athletics at the VI Bolivarian Games
- Dates: August 25 - September 6
- Host city: Maracaibo, Venezuela
- Venue: Estadio Olímpico
- Level: Senior
- Events: 32 (22 men, 10 women)

Athletics competitions at the 1970 Bolivarian Games were held at the Estadio Olímpico in Maracaibo, Venezuela, between August 25 - September 6, 1970.

A detailed history of the early editions of the Bolivarian Games between 1938 and 1989 was published in a book written (in Spanish) by José Gamarra Zorrilla, former president of the Bolivian Olympic Committee, and first president (1976-1982) of ODESUR. Gold medal winners from Ecuador were published by the Comité Olímpico Ecuatoriano.

A total of 32 events were contested, 22 by men and 10 by women.

== Medal summary ==
Medal winners were published.

=== Men ===
Event	Gold		Silver		Bronze	
100 metres	Fernando Acevedo (PER)	10.2	Arquímedes Herrera (VEN)	10.4	Alberto Marchán (VEN)	10.4
200 metres	Fernando Acevedo (PER)	21.1	Arquímedes Herrera (VEN)	21.5	Jimmy Sierra (COL)	21.5
400 metres	Fernando Acevedo (PER)	46.1	Midonio Palacios (COL)	48.2	Raúl Dome (VEN)	48.3
800 metres	Wilfredo León (VEN)	1:50.9	Ricardo Bailey (PAN)	1:52.7	Jofre Camacho (VEN)	1:52.9
1500 metres	Félix Mantilla (COL)	3:56.9	José Valdivia (PER)	3:57.7	Julio Orense (VEN)	3:57.37
5000 metres	Víctor Mora (COL)	14:08.1	Miguel Hernández (COL)	14:50.8	Lucirio Garrido (VEN)	14:51.0
10,000 metres	Domingo Tibaduiza (COL)	31:23.8	Miguel Hernández (COL)	31:25.3	Luis Castro (ECU)	31:42.2
Marathon	José Moreno (PAN)	2:51:49	Uis Romero (VEN)	2:53:08	Martín Pavón (COL)	2:56:17
110 metres hurdles	Jesús Villegas (COL)	14.5	Alfredo Deza (PER)	14.5	Jacobo Bucaram (ECU)	14.8
400 metres hurdles	Víctor Maldonado (VEN)	51.0	Alfredo Deza (PER)	51.7	Amos Milwood (PAN)	52.6
3000 metres steeplechase	Víctor Mora (COL)	8:54.6	Rafael Baracaldo (COL)	9:16.2	Lucirio Garrido (VEN)	9:23.1
4 x 100 metres relay	Venezuela; Arquímedes Herrera; Segundo Guerra; Castro; Alberto Marchán	40.5	Peru; Martinich; Augusto Marchinaris; Jorge Aleman; Fernando Acevedo	40.6	Colombia; Murillo; Wenceslao Ferrín; Jimmy Sierra; Pedro Grajales	40.9
4 x 400 metres relay	Venezuela; Segundo Guerra; Flores; Roberto Sarmiento; Raúl Dome	3:08.0	Peru; Jorge Aleman; Alfredo Deza; Siguas; Fernando Acevedo	3:08.7	Colombia; Jimmy Sierra; Obregón; Pedro Grajales; Migdonio Palacios	3:08.8
High jump	Fernando Abugattás (PER)	2.10	Roberto Abugattás (PER)	2.05	Luis Arbulú (PER)	2.00
Pole vault	Héctor Thomas (VEN)	4.15	Ciro Valdés (COL)	4.15	Luis Mejía (PER)	4.15
Long jump	Miguel Zapata (COL)	7.50	Juan Muñoz (VEN)	7.18	Alexis Landaeta (VEN)	7.18
Triple jump	Iván Baldayo (VEN)	15.17	Jaime Pautt (COL)	14.90	Clevis Fuentes (VEN)	14.80
Shot put	Héctor Thomas (VEN)	14.91				
Discus throw	Dagoberto González (COL)	52.08	Gustavo Gutiérrez (COL)	5?.36	Ceferino Andar (VEN)	42.70
Hammer throw	Marcelino Borrero (COL)	52.60	Carlos Menchelli (PER)	50.04	Paul Hurtado (PER)	49.72
Javelin throw	Gustavo Gutiérrez (COL)	71.28	Ramón Rodríguez (VEN)	69.42	Dante Yorges (PER)	62.73
Decathlon	Héctor Thomas (VEN)	7091	Néstor Villegas (COL)	6644	Luis Planchart (VEN)	6554

=== Women ===
Event	Gold		Silver		Bronze	
100 metres	Juana Mosquera (COL)	11.9	María Luisa Vilca (PER)	12.0	Elsa Antúnez (VEN)	12.1
200 metres	Elsa Antúnez (VEN)	24.7	Diva Bishop (PAN)	24.7	Juana Mosquera (COL)	24.9
100 metres hurdles	Lucía Vaamonde (VEN)	14.8	Edith Noeding (PER)	15.1	Alicia Barrera (PER)	15.3
4 x 100 metres relay	Panama; Margarita Martínez; Nivia Trejos; Diva Bishop; Patricia Morgan	47.1	Venezuela; Elsa Antúnez; Lucía Vaamonde; Lourdes Vargas; Doris Rivas	47.5	Colombia; Carcamo; Naranjo; Ana Maquilon; Juana Mosquera	48.1
High jump	Mery Flor Cozier (VEN)	1.54	Patricia Montero (PER)	1.54	Sheila Guerrero (PAN)	1.52
Long jump	Lucía Vaamonde (VEN)	5.78	María Luisa Vilca (PER)	5.56	Edith Noeding (PER)	5.48
Shot put	Delia Vera (PER)	12.33	Francisca Gooding (VEN)	12.09	Patricia Andrus (VEN)	11.82
Discus throw	Isolina Vergara (COL)	40.12	Dalia Quintero (VEN)	35.44	Patricia Andrus (VEN)	35.25
Javelin throw	Gladys González (VEN)	43.72	Ana López (PAN)	43.10	Nora Rodríguez (COL)	42.62
Pentathlon	Lucía Vaamonde (VEN)	4403	Edith Noeding (PER)	3834	Alicia Barrera (PER)	3544

== Medal table (unofficial) ==
* Host nation (Venezuela)

Rank	Nation	Gold	Silver	Bronze	Total
1	Venezuela (VEN)*	14	8	13	35
2	Colombia (COL)	11	8	7	26
3	Peru (PER)	5	12	7	24
4	Panama (PAN)	2	3	2	7
5	Ecuador (ECU)	0	0	2	2
Totals (5 entries)		32	31	31	94
