= Jorge Grosser =

Chilean middle-distance runner (born 1945)

Personal information
- Full name: Jorge Grosser Castillo
- Born: 8 July 1945 (age 81) Valparaíso, Chile
- Height: 1.79 m (5 ft 10 in)
- Weight: 60 kg (132 lb)

Sport
- Sport: Middle-distance running
- Events: 800 m, 1500 m, 3000 m steeplechase

Jorge Grosser Castillo (born 8 July 1945) is a Chilean middle-distance runner. He competed in the men's 1500 metres at the 1968 Summer Olympics.

== International competitions ==
Year	Competition	Venue	Position	Event	Notes
Representing Chile
1964	South American Junior Championships	Santiago, Chile	2nd	800 m	1:56.4
1964	South American Junior Championships	Santiago, Chile	1st	1500 m	4:06.7
1964	South American Junior Championships	Santiago, Chile	3rd	4 × 400 m relay	3:23.2
1965	South American Championships	Rio de Janeiro, Brazil	2nd	800 m	1:55.1
1965	South American Championships	Rio de Janeiro, Brazil	5th	1500 m	3:56.7
1967	Pan American Games	Winnipeg, Canada	12th (h)	800 m	1:55.46
1967	Pan American Games	Winnipeg, Canada	7th	1500 m	3:48.01
1967	South American Championships	Buenos Aires, Argentina	1st	800 m	1:51.6
1967	South American Championships	Buenos Aires, Argentina	1st	1500 m	3:52.2
1967	South American Championships	Buenos Aires, Argentina	6th (h)	4 × 400 m relay	3:24.7^{1}
1968	Olympic Games	Mexico, Mexico	17th (h)	1500 m	3:51.79^{2}
1969	South American Championships	Quito, Ecuador	1st	800 m	1:54.1
1969	South American Championships	Quito, Ecuador	1st	1500 m	4:04.7
1969	South American Championships	Quito, Ecuador	1st	3000 m s'chase	9:51.2
1969	South American Championships	Quito, Ecuador	4th	4 × 400 m relay	3:13.9
1971	Pan American Games	Cali, Colombia	9th	1500 m	3:52.68
1974	South American Championships	Santiago, Chile	2nd	3000 m s'chase	9:00.0

^{1}Disqualified in the final
^{2}Did not finish in the semifinals

== Personal bests ==
- 800 metres – 1:49.0 (Valparaíso 1969)
- 1500 metres – 3:42.5 (Valparaíso 1971)
- 3000 metres – 8:10.3 (Valparaíso 1971)
- 5000 metres – 14:19.0 (Valparaíso 1970)
- 10,000 metres – 29:46.3 (Valparaíso 1970)
- 3000 metres steeplechase – 8:49.2 (Valparaíso 1973)
