= Aída dos Santos =

Brazilian athlete (born 1937)

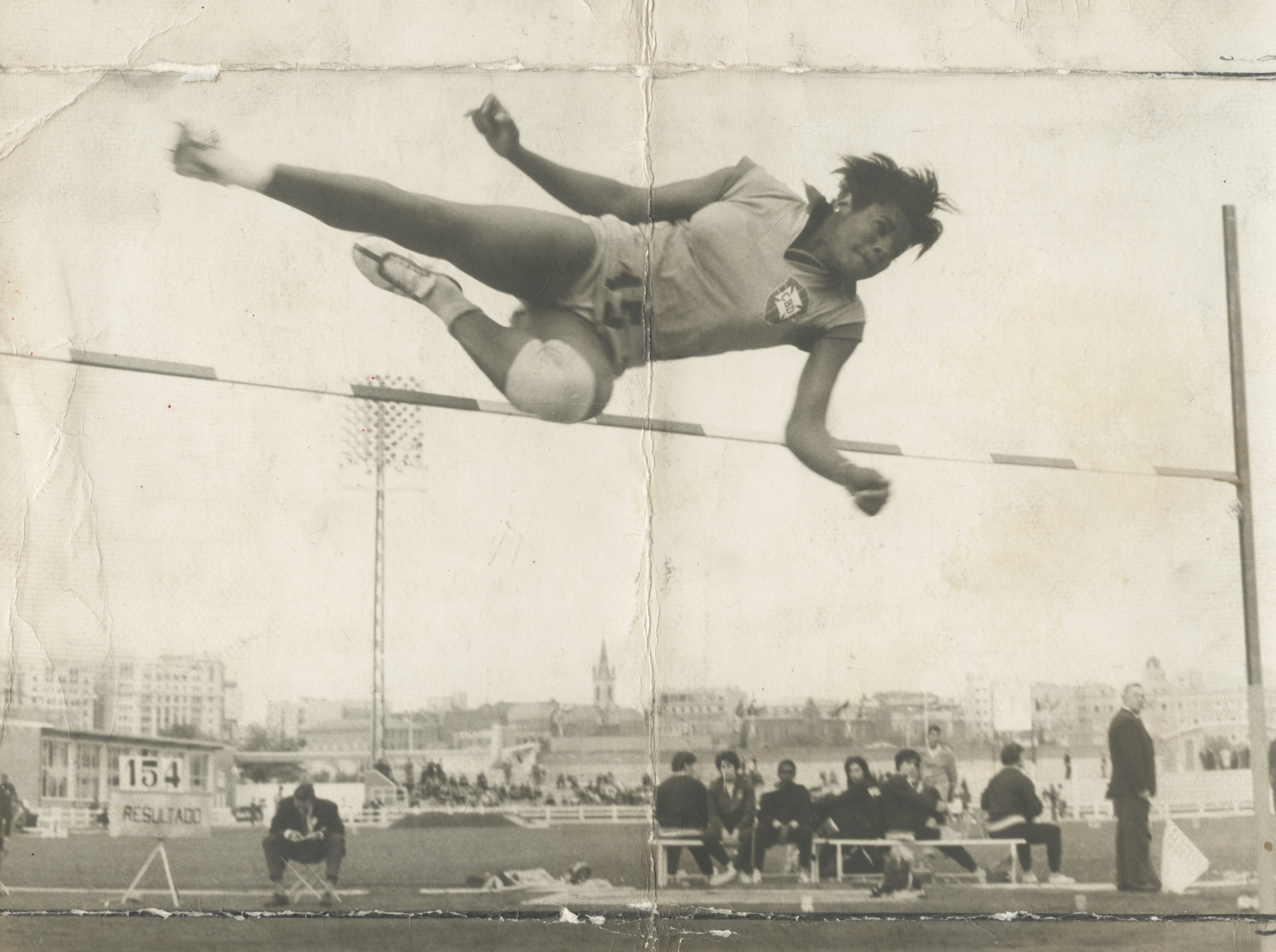
- Aída dos Santos in 1965

Personal information
- Born: 1 March 1937 (age 89) Niterói, Rio de Janeiro, Brazil

Sport
- Sport: Athletics
- Event: High jump

Aída Menezes dos Santos (born 1 March 1937) is a Brazilian former athlete. She competed in the women's high jump at the 1964 Summer Olympics, finishing in 4th place. She reached the mark of 1,74 m (5 ft 8 ½ in).

She was born prematurely, the youngest of six siblings, the daughter of an alcoholic bricklayer and a laundress. She lived with his family in Morro do Arroz, a slum in Niterói. During primary school she worked as a maid and studied hungry. She was discovered by Fluminense (Brazilian sports club), in the first competition she won, she was beaten up by her father, who said that a medal doesn’t pay her bills. When she was at Vasco (Brazilian sports club), She didn't go to training because she used the ticket money to buy food.

To attend college, she attended courses in the morning and, worked in the afternoon and trained at night. She graduated in geography, physical education and pedagogy. From 1975 to 1987, she was a professor of physical education at the Fluminense Federal University (UFF).

In that edition of the Summer Olympics, Aída was the only woman in the Brazilian delegation, and only one for athletics. No structure was offered to her: she traveled without a technician and without material to compete. She didn't even have clothes for the Opening Ceremony: she wore a uniform adapted from another competition. Even so, she became the first woman in Brazil to compete in an Olympic final.

== International competitions ==
Year	Competition	Venue	Position	Event	Notes
Representing Brazil
1961	South American Championships	Lima, Peru	1st	High jump	1.60 m
1962	Ibero-American Games	Madrid, Spain	1st	High jump	1.56 m
1963	Pan American Games	São Paulo, Brazil	5th	High jump	1.53 m
1963	South American Championships	Cali, Colombia	2nd	High jump	1.58 m
1963	South American Championships	Cali, Colombia	2nd	Javelin throw	38.29 m
1964	Olympic Games	Tokyo, Japan	4th	High jump	1.74 m
1965	South American Championships	Rio de Janeiro, Brazil	2nd	High jump	1.66 m
1967	Pan American Games	Winnipeg, Canada	5th	High jump	1.55 m
1967	Pan American Games	Winnipeg, Canada	3rd	Pentathlon	4531 pts
1967	South American Championships	Buenos Aires, Argentina	5th (h)	200 m	25.7 s (w)
1967	South American Championships	Buenos Aires, Argentina	1st	4 × 100 m relay	48.2 s
1967	South American Championships	Buenos Aires, Argentina	2nd	High jump	1.60 m
1967	South American Championships	Buenos Aires, Argentina	8th	Javelin throw	33.24 m
1968	Olympic Games	Mexico City, Mexico	20th	Pentathlon	4578 pts
1969	South American Championships	Quito, Ecuador	1st	4 × 100 m relay	46.0 s
1969	South American Championships	Quito, Ecuador	2nd	High jump	1.60 m
1969	South American Championships	Quito, Ecuador	5th	Javelin throw	38.38 m
1969	South American Championships	Quito, Ecuador	1st	Pentathlon	4422 pts
1971	Pan American Games	Cali, Colombia	3rd	Pentathlon	3887 pts
1971	South American Championships	Lima, Peru	7th (h)	200 m	25.7 s
1971	South American Championships	Lima, Peru	5th	4 × 100 m relay	48.6 s
1971	South American Championships	Lima, Peru	5th	Shot put	11.05 m
1971	South American Championships	Lima, Peru	1st	Pentathlon	3716 pts
