= Ezequiel Baeza =

Chilean long-distance runner

Personal information
- Born: 8 May 1944 (age 82) Santiago, Chile
- Height: 1.63 m (5 ft 4 in)
- Weight: 57 kg (126 lb)

Sport
- Sport: Long-distance running
- Event: Marathon

Ezequiel Baeza (born 8 May 1944) is a Chilean long-distance runner. He competed in the marathon at the 1968 Summer Olympics.

== International competitions ==
Year	Competition	Venue	Position	Event	Notes
Representing Chile
1968	Olympic Games	Mexico City, Mexico	36th	Marathon	2:43:15
1969	South American Championships	Quito, Ecuador	5th	5000 m	16:20.2
1969	South American Championships	Quito, Ecuador	8th	10,000 m	NT
1969	South American Championships	Quito, Ecuador	5th	Marathon	2:51:03

== Personal bests ==
- 10,000 metres – 30:46.6 (1969)
- Marathon – 2:28:33.8 (1968)
