= Athletics at the 1971 Pan American Games – Men's 400 metres =

Men's 400 metres at the Pan American Games

The men's 400 metres event at the 1971 Pan American Games was held in Cali on 31 July and 1 August.

== Medalists ==
Gold	Silver	Bronze
John Smith; United States	Fred Newhouse; United States	Fernando Acevedo; Peru

== Results ==
=== Heats ===
Held on 31 July

Rank	Heat	Name	Nationality	Time	Notes
1	1	Fernando Acevedo	Peru	45.81	Q
2	2	Fred Newhouse	United States	45.83	Q
3	4	Garth Case	Jamaica	46.94	Q
4	2	Kent Bernard	Trinidad and Tobago	47.00	Q
5	4	Antonio Álvarez	Cuba	47.18	Q
6	2	Alfred Daley	Jamaica	47.24	Q
7	4	Víctor Patinez	Venezuela	47.33	Q
8	1	John Smith	United States	47.49	Q
9	2	Melesio Piña	Mexico	47.67	Q
10	3	Jimmy Sierra	Colombia	47.74	Q
11	1	Raúl Dome	Venezuela	48.00	Q
12	2	Pedro Grajales	Colombia	48.06	
13	3	João Pedro Francisco	Brazil	48.17	Q
14	3	Doug Chapman	Canada	48.25	Q
15	4	Jorge Alemán	Peru	48.32	Q
16	3	Rodovaldo Díaz	Cuba	48.37	Q
17	1	Alberto Gajate	Argentina	48.55	Q
18	1	Ian Gordon	Canada	48.64	
19	4	Carlos Abbott	Costa Rica	48.66	
20	3	Walter Pankey	Virgin Islands	48.84	
21	3	Carlos Heuchert	Argentina	48.92	
22	1	Felipe Cigala	Mexico	49.05	
23	4	Enrique Almarante	Dominican Republic	49.10	
24	3	Alfred Logie	Trinidad and Tobago	49.15	
25	2	Tobias Tejada	Dominican Republic	50.09	

=== Semifinals ===
Held on 31 July

Rank	Heat	Name	Nationality	Time	Notes
1	2	Fred Newhouse	United States	45.68	Q
2	1	John Smith	United States	46.11	Q
3	1	Fernando Acevedo	Peru	46.33	Q
4	2	Garth Case	Jamaica	46.77	Q
5	1	Alfred Daley	Jamaica	47.01	Q
6	1	Kent Bernard	Trinidad and Tobago	47.25	Q
7	2	Antonio Álvarez	Cuba	47.69	Q
8	1	Melesio Piña	Mexico	47.74	
9	1	Raúl Dome	Venezuela	47.82	
10	2	Doug Chapman	Canada	47.87	Q
11	1	Rodovaldo Díaz	Cuba	48.10	
12	2	Víctor Patinez	Venezuela	48.46	
13	2	Jorge Alemán	Peru	48.66	
14	1	João Pedro Francisco	Brazil	50.24	
	2	Alberto Gajate	Argentina	DNS	
	2	Jimmy Sierra	Colombia	DNS	

=== Final ===
Held on 1 August

Rank	Name	Nationality	Time	Notes
1st place, gold medalist(s)	John Smith	United States	44.60	GR
2nd place, silver medalist(s)	Fred Newhouse	United States	45.08	
3rd place, bronze medalist(s)	Fernando Acevedo	Peru	45.30	
4	Alfred Daley	Jamaica	46.52	
5	Garth Case	Jamaica	46.82	
6	Doug Chapman	Canada	47.28	
7	Kent Bernard	Trinidad and Tobago	47.43	
8	Antonio Álvarez	Cuba	47.46	
