= Fernando Acevedo =

Peruvian sprinter (1946–2024)

Fernando Acevedo Portuguez
Personal information
- Full name: Héctor Fernando Acevedo Portuguez
- Born: 26 July 1946 Chincha, Ica, Peru
- Died: 29 January 2024 (aged 77)
- Height: 1.75 m (5 ft 9 in)
- Weight: 65 kg (143 lb)

Sport
- Country: Peru
- Sport: Men's Athletics

Achievements and titles
- Olympic finals: 1972 Summer Olympics
Medal record
Men's Athletics
Representing Peru
Pan American Games
Bronze medal – third place	1971 Cali	400 m
Bolivarian Games
Gold medal – first place	1970 Maracaibo	100 m
Gold medal – first place	1970 Maracaibo	200 m
Gold medal – first place	1970 Maracaibo	400 m
Gold medal – first place	1973 Panama City	400 m
Gold medal – first place	1977 La Paz	200 m
Gold medal – first place	1977 La Paz	400 m
Silver medal – second place	1977 La Paz	100 m

Héctor Fernando Acevedo Portuguez (26 July 1946 – 29 January 2024) was a Peruvian track and field athlete, who won the bronze medal in the men's 400 metres at the 1971 Pan American Games. He represented his native country at the 1968 Summer Olympics in Mexico City and at the 1972 Summer Olympics in Munich, West Germany. He is still the Peruvian National record holder in the 200 metres and the 400 metres and was the anchor man of the 4 × 400 metres relay team, the 400 and relay set in a 4-day period at the Pan American Games. Acevedo died on 29 January 2024, at the age of 77.

== International competitions ==
Year	Competition	Venue	Position	Event	Notes
Representing Peru
1967	Pan American Games	Winnipeg, Canada	11th (sf)	100 m	10.59
1967	Pan American Games	Winnipeg, Canada	10th (sf)	200 m	21.17
1967	Pan American Games	Winnipeg, Canada	8th	4 × 100 m relay	41.00
1967	Pan American Games	Winnipeg, Canada	4th	4 × 400 m relay	3:09.97
1967	South American Championships	Buenos Aires, Argentina	3rd	100 m	10.5
1967	South American Championships	Buenos Aires, Argentina	5th (sf)	200 m	21.5
1967	South American Championships	Buenos Aires, Argentina	1st (h)	4 × 100 m relay	41.4^{1}
1967	South American Championships	Buenos Aires, Argentina	2nd	4 × 400 m relay	3:15.4
1968	Olympic Games	Mexico City, Mexico	15th (sf)	400 m	20.91
1969	South American Championships	Quito, Ecuador	2nd	100 m	10.6
1969	South American Championships	Quito, Ecuador	2nd	200 m	21.0
1969	South American Championships	Quito, Ecuador	2nd	4 × 100 m relay	40.7
1969	South American Championships	Quito, Ecuador	3rd	4 × 400 m relay	3:13.7
1970	Bolivarian Games	Maracaibo, Venezuela	1st	100 m	10.2
1970	Bolivarian Games	Maracaibo, Venezuela	1st	200 m	21.1
1970	Bolivarian Games	Maracaibo, Venezuela	1st	400 m	46.1
1970	Bolivarian Games	Maracaibo, Venezuela	2nd	4 × 100 m relay	40.6
1970	Bolivarian Games	Maracaibo, Venezuela	2nd	4 × 400 m relay	3:08.7
1971	Pan American Games	Cali, Colombia	4th	200 m	20.69
1971	Pan American Games	Cali, Colombia	3rd	400 m	45.30
1971	Pan American Games	Cali, Colombia	7th	4 × 100 m relay	41.10
1971	Pan American Games	Cali, Colombia	5th	4 × 400 m relay	3:08.5
1971	South American Championships	Lima, Peru	3rd (h)	100 m	10.6
1971	South American Championships	Lima, Peru	1st	200 m	21.2
1971	South American Championships	Lima, Peru	1st	400 m	46.4
1971	South American Championships	Lima, Peru	3rd	4 × 100 m relay	41.2
1971	South American Championships	Lima, Peru	4th	4 × 400 m relay	3:16.4
1972	Olympic Games	Munich, West Germany	5th (h)	400 m	45.80^{2}
1973	Bolivarian Games	Panama City, Panama	1st	400 m	46.50
1973	Bolivarian Games	Panama City, Panama	2nd	4 × 100 m relay	41.6
1977	Bolivarian Games	La Paz, Bolivia	2nd	100 m	10.43 A
1977	Bolivarian Games	La Paz, Bolivia	1st	200 m	20.82 A
1977	Bolivarian Games	La Paz, Bolivia	1st	400 m	45.43 A
1977	Bolivarian Games	La Paz, Bolivia	2nd	4 × 100 m relay	41.17 A
1977	Bolivarian Games	La Paz, Bolivia	3rd	4 × 400 m relay	3:16.8 A

^{1}Did not finish in the final
^{2}Did not start in the final

== Personal bests ==
- 200 metres – 20.69 (1971)
- 400 metres – 45.30 (1971)
