= Athletics at the 1971 Pan American Games – Men's 1500 metres =

Men's 1500 metres at the Pan American Games

The men's 1500 metres event at the 1971 Pan American Games was held in Cali on 31 July and 1 August.

== Medalists ==
Gold	Silver	Bronze
Marty Liquori; United States	Bill Smart; Canada	Jim Crawford; United States

== Results ==
=== Heats ===
Rank	Heat	Name	Nationality	Time	Notes
1	2	Jim Crawford	United States	3:48.80	Q
2	2	Bill Smart	Canada	3:49.16	Q
3	1	Marty Liquori	United States	3:49.40	Q
4	1	Carlos Rodolfo Martínez	Mexico	3:49.47	Q
5	2	Gildardo López	Mexico	3:49.94	Q
6	2	Donaldo Arza	Panama	3:50.89	Q
7	1	Richard Ritchie	Canada	3:50.97	Q
8	1	Jorge Grosser	Chile	3:51.36	Q
9	1	Antonio Colón	Puerto Rico	3:52.03	Q
10	2	Julio Orense	Venezuela	3:52.15	Q
11	2	Víctor Ríos	Chile	3:52.15	
12	2	Hugo Burgos	Colombia	3:52.25	
13	1	José Neira	Colombia	3:52.28	
14	1	Sergio Llanusa	Cuba	3:53.34	
15	2	José Bordón	Cuba	3:57.85	
16	1	Modesto Comprés	Dominican Republic	3:58.37	
17	1	?		4:20.01	
18	2	Byron Dyce	Jamaica	4:25.10	

=== Final ===
Rank	Name	Nationality	Time	Notes
1st place, gold medalist(s)	Marty Liquori	United States	3:42.10	GR
2nd place, silver medalist(s)	Bill Smart	Canada	3:43.39	
3rd place, bronze medalist(s)	Jim Crawford	United States	3:43.76	
4	Donaldo Arza	Panama	3:44.75	
5	Richard Ritchie	Canada	3:46.63	
6	Gildardo López	Mexico	3:48.38	
7	Carlos Rodolfo Martínez	Mexico	3:49.50	
8	Julio Orense	Venezuela	3:50.06	
9	Jorge Grosser	Chile	3:52.68	
10	Antonio Colón	Puerto Rico	3:57.86	
