= Silvina Pereira =

Brazilian sprinter

Personal information
- Full name: Silvina das Graças Pereira da Silva
- Born: 31 October 1948 (age 76) Botafogo, Rio de Janeiro, Brazil
- Height: 1.69 m (5 ft 7 in)
- Weight: 53 kg (117 lb)

Sport
- Sport: Sprinting
- Event(s): 100 m, 200 m, long jump

Silvina das Graças Pereira da Silva (born 31 October 1948) is a Brazilian sprinter. She competed in the women's 200 metres at the 1976 Summer Olympics.

== International competitions ==
Year	Competition	Venue	Position	Event	Notes
Representing Brazil
1966	South American Junior Championships	Montevideo, Uruguay	5th	100 m	12.6 s
1966	South American Junior Championships	Montevideo, Uruguay	3rd	4 × 100 m relay	49.0 s
1967	South American Championships	Buenos Aires, Argentina	1st	100 m	11.8 s
1967	South American Championships	Buenos Aires, Argentina	1st	200 m	24.5 s
1967	South American Championships	Buenos Aires, Argentina	1st	4 × 100 m relay	48.2 s
1967	South American Championships	Buenos Aires, Argentina	4th	Long jump	5.54 m
1969	South American Championships	Quito, Ecuador	1st	100 m	11.7 s
1969	South American Championships	Quito, Ecuador	1st	200 m	24.0 s
1969	South American Championships	Quito, Ecuador	1st	4 × 100 m relay	46.0 s
1969	South American Championships	Quito, Ecuador	1st	Long jump	5.85 m
1971	Pan American Games	Cali, Colombia	7th (sf)	100 m	11.71 s^{1}
1971	Pan American Games	Cali, Colombia	2nd	Long jump	6.35 m
1975	South American Championships	Rio de Janeiro, Brazil	1st	100 m	11.7 s
1975	South American Championships	Rio de Janeiro, Brazil	1st	200 m	23.4 s
1975	South American Championships	Rio de Janeiro, Brazil	2nd	4 × 100 m relay	45.9s
1975	South American Championships	Rio de Janeiro, Brazil	1st	Long jump	6.11 m
1975	Pan American Games	Mexico City, Mexico	3rd	200 m	23.17 s
1975	Pan American Games	Mexico City, Mexico	6th	4 × 100 m relay	45.21 s
1975	Pan American Games	Mexico City, Mexico	4th	Long jump	6.44 m
1976	Olympcs Games	Montreal, Canada	27th (h)	200 m	24.00 s
1976	Olympcs Games	Montreal, Canada	16th (h)	Long jump	6.13
1985	South American Championships	Santiago, Chile	4th	Long jump	5.67 m

^{1}Did not start in the final

== Personal bests ==
Outdoor

- 100 metres – 11.5 (Rio de Janeiro 1975)
- 200 metres – 23.17 A (-0.6 m/s, Mexico City 1975)
- Long jump – 6.53 (NWI, Rio de Janeiro 1975)
