= Orien Brown =

American sprinter

Personal information
- Born: March 4, 1952 (age 74)
- Education: Texas Southern University

Sport
- Sport: Athletics
- Event: 100 metres

Achievements and titles
- Personal best: 11.3 seconds (1970)
Medal record
Representing United States
Pan American Games
Gold medal – first place	1971 Cali	4 × 100 m relay

Orien Brown (born March 4, 1952) is a former American sprinter. She won the gold medal in the 4 × 100 metres relay at the 1971 Pan American Games.

Brown competed in college representing Texas Southern University. In 1971, she won the 100 yard dash at the Texas Relays in a wind-aided time of 10.4 seconds.

Brown has coached the track and field teams at Dallas Skyline High School and Bishop Dunne Catholic School. In 2017, she was inducted into the Texas Black Sports Hall of Fame.
