= Guillermo Cuello =

Argentine middle-distance runner (born 1940)

Personal information
- Nationality: Argentine
- Born: 9 November 1940 (age 85) Buenos Aires, Argentina
- Height: 1.93 m (6 ft 4 in)
- Weight: 83 kg (183 lb)

Sport
- Sport: Middle-distance running
- Event: 800 metres

Guillermo Cuello (born 9 November 1940) is a retired Argentine middle-distance runner. He competed in the men's 800 metres at the 1968 Summer Olympics.

== International competitions ==
Year	Competition	Venue	Position	Event	Notes
Representing Argentina
1965	South American Championships	Rio de Janeiro, Brazil	–	800 m	DQ
1967	South American Championships	Buenos Aires, Argentina	2nd	800 m	1:52.0
1967	South American Championships	Buenos Aires, Argentina	3rd	400 m hurdles	53.3
1967	South American Championships	Buenos Aires, Argentina	4th	4 × 400 m relay	3:18.1
1968	Olympic Games	Mexico City, Mexico	–	800 m	DNF

== Personal bests ==
- 800 metres – 1:50.0h (Buenos Aires 1968) former NR
- 1500 metres – 3:52.8h (Buenos Aires 1968)
- 400 metres hurdles – 53.3h (Buenos Aires 1967)
