= Jimmy Sierra =

Colombian sprinter (born 1949)

Personal information
- Nationality: Colombian
- Born: 19 July 1949 (age 76) Cali, Colombia
- Height: 1.70 m (5 ft 7 in)
- Weight: 64 kg (141 lb)

Sport
- Sport: Sprinting
- Event: 100 metres

Jimmy Sierra (born 19 July 1949) is a retired Colombian sprinter. He competed in the men's 100 metres at the 1968 Summer Olympics.

== International competitions ==
Year	Competition	Venue	Position	Event	Notes
Representing Colombia
1968	Olympic Games	Mexico City, Mexico	59th (h)	100 m	10.88
1968	South American Junior Championships	São Bernardo do Campo, Brazil	1st	100 m	10.8
1968	South American Junior Championships	São Bernardo do Campo, Brazil	1st	200 m	21.7
1969	South American Championships	Quito, Ecuador	7th (h)	200 m	21.8
1969	South American Championships	Quito, Ecuador	6th	400 m	49.0
1969	South American Championships	Quito, Ecuador	1st	4 × 100 m relay	40.2
1969	South American Championships	Quito, Ecuador	5th	4 × 400 m relay	3:16.0
1970	Central American and Caribbean Games	Panama City, Panama	13th (sf)	100 m	10.6
1970	Central American and Caribbean Games	Panama City, Panama	4th (h)	200 m	21.9
1970	Central American and Caribbean Games	Panama City, Panama	2nd	4 × 100 m relay	40.8
1970	Bolivarian Games	Maracaibo, Venezuela	5th	100 m	10.6
1970	Bolivarian Games	Maracaibo, Venezuela	3rd	200 m	21.5
1970	Bolivarian Games	Maracaibo, Venezuela	3rd	4 × 100 m relay	40.9
1970	Bolivarian Games	Maracaibo, Venezuela	3rd	4 × 400 m relay	3:08.8
1971	Pan American Games	Cali, Colombia	18th (h)	100 m	10.66
1971	Pan American Games	Cali, Colombia	10th (h)	400 m	47.74^{1}
1971	Pan American Games	Cali, Colombia	9th (h)	4 × 100 m relay	41.17
1972	Olympic Games	Munich, West Germany	15th (qf)	200 m	20.87

^{1}Did not start in the semifinals

== Personal bests ==
- 100 metres – 10.3 (1968)
- 200 metres – 21.10 (1972)
