= Nazario Araújo =

Argentine long-distance runner

Personal information
- Nationality: Argentine
- Born: 25 May 1945 (age 81)
- Height: 1.65 m (5 ft 5 in)
- Weight: 59 kg (130 lb)

Sport
- Sport: Long-distance running
- Event: Marathon

Nazario Araújo (born 25 May 1945) is an Argentine long-distance runner. He competed in the marathon at the 1972 Summer Olympics.

== International competitions ==
Year	Competition	Venue	Position	Event	Notes
Representing Argentina
1969	South American Championships	Quito, Ecuador	6th	5000 m	16:26.8
1969	South American Championships	Quito, Ecuador	4th	Marathon	2:50:09
1972	Olympic Games	Munich, West Germany	–	Marathon	DNF

== Personal bests ==
- Marathon – 2:23:50 (1972)
