= Andrés Calonge =

Argentine sprinter (born 1945)

Andrés Calonje
Personal information
- Full name: Andrés Roberto Calonje
- Nationality: Argentine
- Born: 2 April 1945 (age 81)
- Height: 1.82 m (6 ft 0 in)
- Weight: 72 kg (159 lb)

Sport
- Sport: Sprinting
- Event: 100 metres

Andrés Roberto Calonje (born 2 April 1945) is an Argentine sprinter. He competed in the 100 metres at the 1968 Summer Olympics and the 1972 Summer Olympics.

== International competitions ==
Year	Competition	Venue	Position	Event	Notes
Representing Argentina
1964	South American Junior Championships	Santiago, Chile	1st	200 m	21.5
1964	South American Junior Championships	Santiago, Chile	1st	400 m	48.7
1964	South American Junior Championships	Santiago, Chile	1st	4 × 100 m relay	41.4
1964	South American Junior Championships	Santiago, Chile	1st	4 × 400 m relay	3:19.8
1965	South American Championships	Rio de Janeiro, Brazil	8th (sf)	100 m	10.8
1965	South American Championships	Rio de Janeiro, Brazil	6th (sf)	200 m	22.1
1965	South American Championships	Rio de Janeiro, Brazil	3rd	400 m	48.4
1965	South American Championships	Rio de Janeiro, Brazil	3rd	4 × 400 m relay	3:17.3
1967	Pan American Games	Winnipeg, Canada	11th (sf)	200 m	21.27 (w)
1967	Pan American Games	Winnipeg, Canada	15th (h)	400 m	48.12^{1}
1967	South American Championships	Buenos Aires, Argentina	5th	200 m	21.4
1967	South American Championships	Buenos Aires, Argentina	3rd	400 m	47.5
1967	South American Championships	Buenos Aires, Argentina	5th (h)	4 × 100 m relay	41.8
1968	Olympic Games	Mexico City, Mexico	25th (qf)	100 m	10.39
1968	Olympic Games	Mexico City, Mexico	22nd (qf)	200 m	21.03
1969	South American Championships	Quito, Ecuador	3rd	100 m	10.7
1969	South American Championships	Quito, Ecuador	3rd	200 m	21.1
1969	South American Championships	Quito, Ecuador	1st	400 m	46.9
1969	South American Championships	Quito, Ecuador	5th	4 × 100 m relay	42.2
1969	South American Championships	Quito, Ecuador	1st	4 × 400 m relay	3:12.3
1971	Pan American Games	Cali, Colombia	11th (sf)	100 m	10.67
1971	Pan American Games	Cali, Colombia	7th	200 m	21.13
1971	Pan American Games	Cali, Colombia	8th	4 × 100 m relay	41.50
1971	Pan American Games	Cali, Colombia	5th (h)	4 × 400 m relay	3:11.1
1972	Olympic Games	Munich, West Germany	49th (h)	100 m	10.73
1972	Olympic Games	Munich, West Germany	24th (qf)	200 m	21.11

^{1}Did not start in the semifinals

== Personal bests ==
- 100 metres – 10.39 A (+1.8 m/s, Mexico City 1968, former NR)
- 200 metres – 20.81 A (0.0 m/s, Mexico City 1968, former NR)
- 400 metres – 48.12 (Winnipeg 1967, former NR)
- 400 metres – 46.7h A (Mexico City 1968, former NR)
