= Patricio Saavedra =

Chilean hurdler

Personal information
- Nationality: Chilean
- Born: 11 January 1947 (age 79)
- Height: 1.78 m (5 ft 10 in)
- Weight: 72 kg (159 lb)

Sport
- Sport: Track and field
- Event: 110 metres hurdles

Patricio Saavedra (born 11 January 1947) is a Chilean hurdler. He competed in the men's 110 metres hurdles at the 1968 Summer Olympics.

== International competitions ==
Year	Competition	Venue	Position	Event	Notes
Representing Chile
1966	South American Junior Championships	Montevideo, Uruguay	1st	110 m hurdles	14.7
1966	South American Junior Championships	Montevideo, Uruguay	2nd	4 × 100 m relay	42.1
1968	Olympic Games	Mexico City, Mexico	27th (h)	110 m hurdles	14.47
1969	South American Championships	Quito, Ecuador	1st	110 m hurdles	14.6
1969	South American Championships	Quito, Ecuador	9th (h)	400 m hurdles	58.8
1969	South American Championships	Quito, Ecuador	3rd	4 × 100 m relay	40.7
1971	South American Championships	Lima, Peru	3rd	110 m hurdles	14.8

== Personal bests ==
- 100 metres – 10.5 (1968)
- 200 metres – 21.5 (1968)
- 110 metres hurdles – 14.2 (1968)
