= Juana Mosquera =

Colombian sprinter (born 1950)

Personal information
- Full name: Juana Mosquera Dohrmann
- Nationality: Colombian
- Born: 19 July 1950 (age 75)
- Height: 1.72 m (5 ft 8 in)
- Weight: 68 kg (150 lb)

Sport
- Sport: Sprinting
- Event: 100 metres
Medal record
Women's Athletics
Representing Colombia
Pan American Games
Bronze medal – third place	1971 Cali	4x100 m relay

Juana Mosquera Dohrmann (born 19 July 1950) is a retired Colombian sprinter. She competed in the women's 100 metres at the 1972 Summer Olympics. She won a bronze medal in the 4 x 100 metres relay at the 1971 Pan American Games.

== International competitions ==
Year	Competition	Venue	Position	Event	Notes
Representing Colombia
1968	South American Junior Championships	São Bernardo do Campo, Brazil	3rd	100 m	12.2
1968	South American Junior Championships	São Bernardo do Campo, Brazil	3rd	200 m	25.7
1969	South American Championships	Quito, Ecuador	5th	100 m	12.5
1969	South American Championships	Quito, Ecuador	6th	200 m	25.4
1969	South American Championships	Quito, Ecuador	6th	4 × 100 m relay	50.7
1969	South American Championships	Quito, Ecuador	9th	Pentathlon	3640 pts
1970	Central American and Caribbean Games	Panama City, Panama	5th	100 m	12.1 (w)
1970	Central American and Caribbean Games	Panama City, Panama	4th	200 m	24.9
1970	Bolivarian Games	Maracaibo, Venezuela	1st	100 m	11.9
1970	Bolivarian Games	Maracaibo, Venezuela	3rd	200 m	24.9
1970	Bolivarian Games	Maracaibo, Venezuela	3rd	4 × 100 m relay	48.1
1971	Pan American Games	Cali, Colombia	5th	100 m	11.49
1971	Pan American Games	Cali, Colombia	6th	200 m	24.26
1971	Pan American Games	Cali, Colombia	3rd	4 × 100 m relay	45.99
1971	Pan American Games	Cali, Colombia	5th	4 × 400 m relay	3:50.43
1972	Olympic Games	Munich, West Germany	24th (qf)	100 m	11.66
1972	Olympic Games	Munich, West Germany	22nd (qf)	200 m	24.00

== Personal bests ==
- 100 metres – 11.60 (1971)
- 200 metres – 24.00 (1972)
