= Fernando Abugattás =

Peruvian high jumper

Personal information
- Born: 13 April 1948 (age 78) Pisco, Peru
- Height: 1.90 m (6 ft 3 in)
- Weight: 80 kg (180 lb)

Sport
- Sport: Athletics
- Event: High jump

Fernando J. Abugattás Aboid (born 13 April 1948) is a Peruvian high jumper. He competed in the 1968 Summer Olympics.

His personal best in the event is 2.16 metres set in 1970. He was brother of fellow high jumper Roberto Abugattás

== International competitions ==
Year	Competition	Venue	Position	Notes
Representing Peru
1966	South American Junior Championships	Montevideo, Uruguay	2nd	1.90 m
1967	South American Championships	Buenos Aires, Argentina	6th	1.90 m
1968	Olympic Games	Mexico City, Mexico	29th (q)	2.03 m
1970	Bolivarian Games	Maracaibo, Venezuela	1st	2.10 m
