= Raúl Dome =

Venezuelan sprinter

Personal information
- Nationality: Venezuelan
- Born: 7 May 1942 (age 84) El Callao, Venezuela
- Height: 1.78 m (5 ft 10 in)
- Weight: 75 kg (165 lb)

Sport
- Sport: Sprinting
- Event: 400 metres

Raúl Dome Sanhouse (born 7 May 1942) is a retired Venezuelan sprinter. He competed in the 4 × 400 metres relay at the 1968 Summer Olympics and the 1972 Summer Olympics.

== International competitions ==
Year	Competition	Venue	Position	Event	Notes
Representing Venezuela
1968	Olympic Games	Mexico City, Mexico	13th (h)	4 × 400 m relay	3:07.65
1969	South American Championships	Quito, Ecuador	8th (h)	200 m	21.9
1969	South American Championships	Quito, Ecuador	2nd	400 m	47.6
1970	Central American and Caribbean Games	Panama City, Panama	10th (sf)	400 m	47.6
1970	Central American and Caribbean Games	Panama City, Panama	4th	4 × 400 m relay	3:09.1
1970	Bolivarian Games	Maracaibo, Venezuela	3rd	400 m	48.3
1970	Bolivarian Games	Maracaibo, Venezuela	1st	4 × 400 m relay	3:08.0
1971	Central American and Caribbean Championships	Kingston, Jamaica	3rd	400 m	47.6
1971	Pan American Games	Cali, Colombia	9th (sf)	400 m	47.82
1971	Pan American Games	Cali, Colombia	7th	4 × 400 m relay	3:08.9
1971	South American Championships	Lima, Peru	4th	400 m	48.5
1971	South American Championships	Lima, Peru	1st	4 × 400 m relay	3:14.8
1972	Olympic Games	Munich, West Germany	12th (h)	4 × 400 m relay	3:06.99
1973	Central American and Caribbean Championships	Maracaibo, Venezuela	4th	4 × 400 m relay	3:10.4

== Personal bests ==
- 400 metres – 47.0 (1970)
