= 1966 South American Junior Championships in Athletics =

VI South American Junior Championships in Athletics
- Dates: October 9–14
- Host city: Montevideo, Uruguay
- Level: U20
- Events: 29
- Participation: about 159 athletes from 6 nations

The sixth South American Junior Championships in Athletics were held in Montevideo, Uruguay from October 9–14, 1966. For the first time, women's events were included.

== Participation (unofficial) ==
Detailed result lists can be found on the "World Junior Athletics History" website. An unofficial count yields the number of about 159 athletes from about 6 countries: Argentina (36), Brazil (36), Chile (33), Paraguay (11), Peru (22), Uruguay (21).

== Medal summary ==
Medal winners are published for men and women Complete results can be found on the "World Junior Athletics History" website.

=== Men ===
Event	Gold		Silver		Bronze	
100 metres	Carlos Ripoll (ARG)	10.5	Lincoln Flores (PER)	10.7	Marcos Vilela (BRA)	10.7
200 metres	Carlos Ripoll (ARG)	22.0	Eduardo Satoyama (ARG)	22.2	Lincoln Flores (PER)	22.3
400 metres	Jaime Núñez (CHI)	49.9	Celso Wolf (BRA)	50.1	Carlos Schopf (URU)	50.3
800 metres	Homero Arce (CHI)	1:58.5	José de Andrade (BRA)	1:59.5	Alberto Gajate (ARG)	1:59.8
1500 metres	Homero Arce (CHI)	4:02.4	Jorge Henríquez (ARG)	4:02.6	Alfredo Aguirre (ARG)	4:03.3
3000 metres	Alfredo Aguirre (ARG)	9:03.0	Jorge Weulle (CHI)	9:04.4	Juan López (CHI)	9:13.8
110 metres hurdles	Patricio Saavedra (CHI)	14.7	Raúl Domínguez (ARG)	15.5	Ricardo Sirvent (ARG)	15.7
400 metres hurdles	Santiago Brumel (CHI)	54.7	Ricardo Sirvent (ARG)	56.3	Juan Kromschroder (CHI)	57.5
1500 metres steeplechase	Jorge Enríquez (ARG)	4:22.5	José Parra (CHI)	4:28.1	Enrique Urrejola (CHI)	4:29.6
4 × 100 metres relay	Argentina; Francisco Verino; Roberto Líñares; Eduardo Satoyama; Carlos Ripoll	41.9	Chile; E. Correa; Patricio Saavedra; Dominique Castillo; Einar Erlandsen	42.1	Peru; Torres; Luis García; César Arroyo; Lincoln Flores	42.6
4 × 400 metres relay	Chile; Santiago Brumel; Dominique Castillo; Homero Arce; Jaime Núñez	3:21.8	Brazil; António Carlos Siquera; Paulo Roberto; Carlos Gallupo; Celso Wolf	3:24.3	Argentina; Eduardo Satoyama; José Pereiro; Roberto Giraudo; Alberto Gajate	3:25.9
High jump	José Dalmastro (ARG)	1.95	Fernando Abugattás (PER)	1.90	Patricio Labar (CHI)	1.90
Pole vault	Marco Baroni (BRA)	3.20	César Noya (PER)	3.20	Luis Cárdenas (PER)	3.20
Long jump	Dominique Castillo (CHI)	6.89	Roberto Chagra (ARG)	6.88	Carlos Proto (CHI)	6.88
Triple jump	Juan Kurata (BRA)	14.18	Luís Puhl (BRA)	13.83	Mario Delfino (ARG)	13.73
Shot put	Cláudio Leal (BRA)	15.86	Juan Bryce (PER)	15.04	Pedro Ugarte (CHI)	14.65
Discus throw	Juan Ruggieri (ARG)	40.88	Esteban Drapich (ARG)	38.95	Juan Bryce (PER)	38.65
Hammer throw	Carlos Gatica (ARG)	54.66	Walter Drago (BRA)	53.43	Celso de Moraes (BRA)	53.20
Javelin throw	Werner Klötzer (CHI)	56.15	Manuel Morimoto (BRA)	50.91	Arnaldo Albero (ARG)	49.61
Pentathlon*	Valdir Barbanti (BRA)	3711	Werner Klötzer (CHI)	3521	Kenji Kido (BRA)	3521

* = another source states rather: Hexathlon

=== Women ===
Event	Gold		Silver		Bronze	
100 metres	Mabel Camprubi (CHI)	12.2	Josefa Vicent (URU)	12.2	Alicia Masuccio (ARG)	12.3
200 metres	Josefa Vicent (URU)	25.7	Graciela Pinto (ARG)	25.9	Alba Oberti (ARG)	26.3
80 metres hurdles	Rosa Sains (CHI)	12.2	Adilia do Rosário (BRA)	12.3	Ana Akiko Omote (BRA)	12.4
4 × 100 metres relay	Chile; Mabel Camprubi; Cristina Miguel; Cecilia Montesinos; Victoria Roa	48.9	Argentina; Alicia Masuccio; Alba Oberti; Graciela Pinto; María Cristina Filgueira	49.0	Brazil; Eliana Leitão; Neide Nakatsukasa; Adilia do Rosário; Silvina Pereira	49.0
High jump	Ana Akiko Omote (BRA)	1.45	Patricia Mantero (PER)	1.45	Cecilia Goddard (CHI)	1.45
Long jump	Yolanda Durant (CHI)	5.01	Yolanda Dimarco (URU)	4.98	Cristina Miguel (CHI)	4.97
Shot put	Marta Silva (CHI)	10.91	M. Jorgensen (BRA)	10.57	Neide Nakatsukasa (BRA)	10.18
Discus throw	Eleonor Torres (CHI)	33.50	Marta Silva (CHI)	33.16	Neide Nakatsukasa (BRA)	33.00
Javelin throw	Maria Sogabe (BRA)	36.47	Hilda Rebolledo (CHI)	34.41	Vilma Totaro (ARG)	32.96

== Medal table (unofficial) ==
* Host nation (Uruguay)

Rank	Nation	Gold	Silver	Bronze	Total
1	Chile (CHI)	14	6	8	28
2	Argentina (ARG)	8	8	9	25
3	Brazil (BRA)	6	8	7	21
4	Uruguay (URU)*	1	2	1	4
5	Peru (PER)	0	5	4	9
Totals (5 entries)		29	29	29	87
