= Pedro Grajales =

Colombian sprinter (born 1940)

Personal information
- Full name: Pedro Antonio Grajales Escobar
- Nationality: Colombian
- Born: 14 June 1940 (age 86) Cali, Colombia
- Height: 1.72 m (5 ft 8 in)
- Weight: 72 kg (159 lb)

Sport
- Sport: Sprinting
- Event: 200 metres

Pedro Antonio Grajales Escobar (born 14 June 1940) is a retired Colombian sprinter. He competed in the 200 metres at the 1964 Summer Olympics and the 1968 Summer Olympics.

An athletics stadium in Cali, Estadio de Atletismo Pedro Grajales, is named in his honour.

== International competitions ==
Year	Competition	Venue	Position	Event	Notes
Representing Colombia
1961	Bolivarian Games	Barranquilla, Colombia	5th	200 m	22.5
1961	Bolivarian Games	Barranquilla, Colombia	2nd	400 m	49.9
1961	Bolivarian Games	Barranquilla, Colombia	2nd	4 × 400 m relay	3:26.0
1963	South American Championships	Cali, Colombia	10th (sf)	200 m	22.3
1963	South American Championships	Cali, Colombia	9th (h)	400 m	49.1
1963	South American Championships	Cali, Colombia	2nd	4 × 100 m relay	41.2
1963	South American Championships	Cali, Colombia	4th	4 × 400 m relay	3:15.9
1964	Olympic Games	Tokyo, Japan	24th (qf)	200 m	21.7
1964	Olympic Games	Tokyo, Japan	26th (qf)	400 m	47.8
1965	South American Championships	Rio de Janeiro, Brazil	5th	200 m	22.3
1965	South American Championships	Rio de Janeiro, Brazil	2nd	400 m	47.5
1965	South American Championships	Rio de Janeiro, Brazil	3rd	4 × 100 m relay	41.6
1965	South American Championships	Rio de Janeiro, Brazil	5th	4 × 400 m relay	3:17.8
1965	Bolivarian Games	Quito, Ecuador	1st	200 m	20.9
1965	Bolivarian Games	Quito, Ecuador	1st	400 m	46.9
1965	Bolivarian Games	Quito, Ecuador	1st	4 × 100 m relay	40.8
1965	Bolivarian Games	Quito, Ecuador	1st	4 × 400 m relay	3:09.4
1966	Central American and Caribbean Games	San Juan, Puerto Rico	5th (h)	200 m	22.4
1966	Central American and Caribbean Games	San Juan, Puerto Rico	9th (h)	400 m	48.5
1966	Central American and Caribbean Games	San Juan, Puerto Rico	6th	4 × 100 m relay	41.3
1967	Pan American Games	Winnipeg, Canada	4th	200 m	21.3
1967	Pan American Games	Winnipeg, Canada	7th	400 m	47.00
1967	Pan American Games	Winnipeg, Canada	3rd	4 × 100 m relay	39.92
1967	Pan American Games	Winnipeg, Canada	5th	4 × 400 m relay	3:10.41
1967	South American Championships	Buenos Aires, Argentina	1st	200 m	20.9
1967	South American Championships	Buenos Aires, Argentina	1st	400 m	46.4
1967	South American Championships	Buenos Aires, Argentina	1st	4 × 100 m relay	41.1
1967	South American Championships	Buenos Aires, Argentina	1st	4 × 400 m relay	3:14.7
1968	Olympic Games	Mexico City, Mexico	24th (qf)	200 m	21.05
1968	Olympic Games	Mexico City, Mexico	26th (qf)	400 m	46.53
1969	South American Championships	Quito, Ecuador	4th	100 m	10.8
1969	South American Championships	Quito, Ecuador	1st	4 × 100 m relay	40.2
1969	South American Championships	Quito, Ecuador	5th	4 × 400 m relay	3:16.0
1970	Central American and Caribbean Games	Panama City, Panama	9th (sf)	200 m	21.6
1970	Central American and Caribbean Games	Panama City, Panama	5th	400 m	47.5
1970	Central American and Caribbean Games	Panama City, Panama	2nd	4 × 100 m relay	40.8
1970	Bolivarian Games	Maracaibo, Venezuela	7th	400 m	49.3
1970	Bolivarian Games	Maracaibo, Venezuela	3rd	4 × 100 m relay	40.9
1970	Bolivarian Games	Maracaibo, Venezuela	3rd	4 × 400 m relay	3:08.8
1971	Pan American Games	Cali, Colombia	3rd (h)	200 m	21.8
1971	Pan American Games	Cali, Colombia	12th (h)	400 m	48.06
1971	Pan American Games	Cali, Colombia	9th (h)	4 × 100 m relay	41.17
1971	Pan American Games	Cali, Colombia	8th	4 × 400 m relay	3:09.5

== Personal bests ==
- 200 metres – 20.7 (1967)
- 400 metres – 46.1 (1967)
