= Fernando Bustamante =

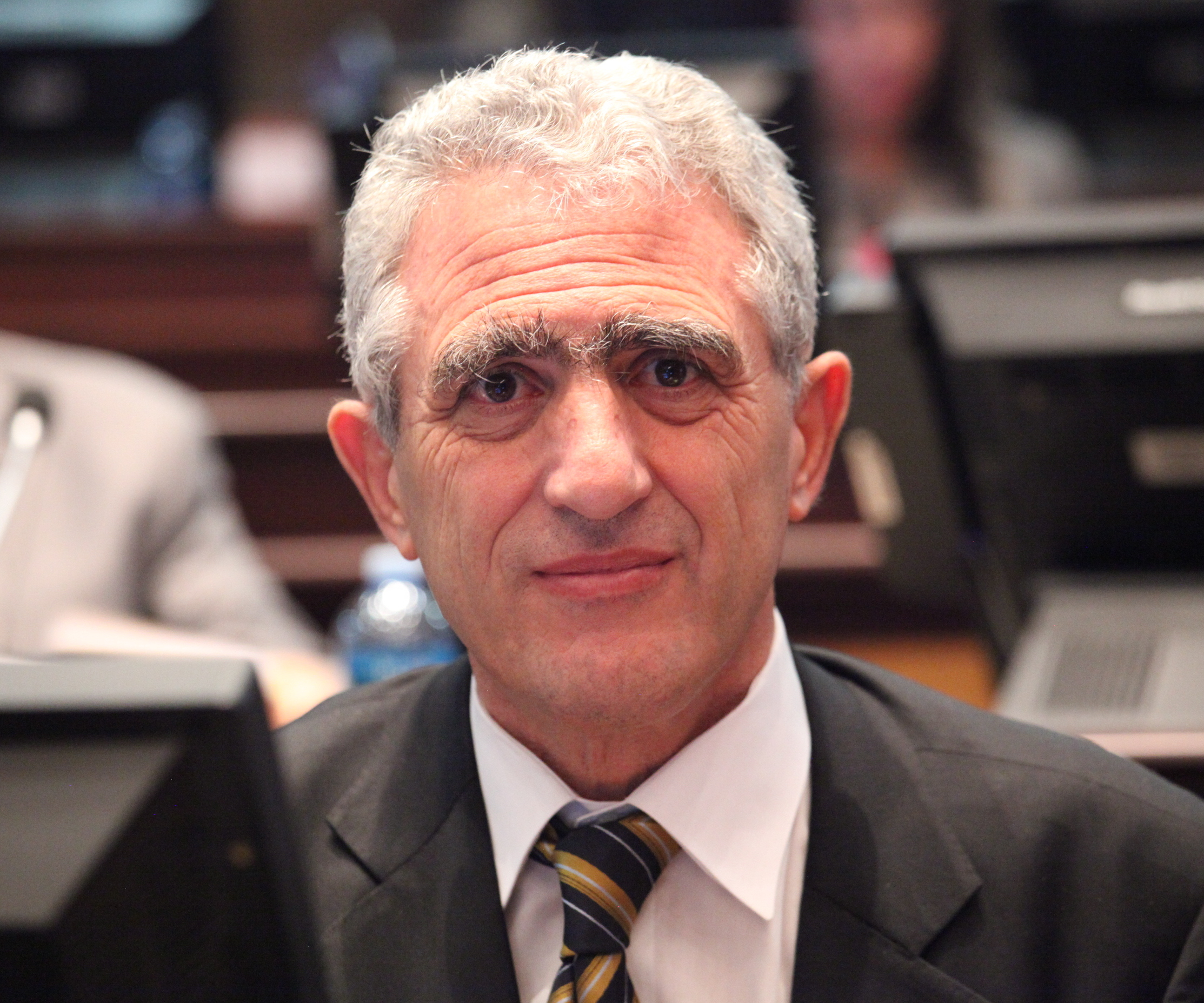
- Ponce in 2013

National Assemblyman of Ecuador
- In office 2009–2017
- Succeeded by: Gustavo Jalkh

Minister of the Interior of Ecuador
- In office November 2007 – February 2009
- Preceded by: Gustavo Larrea

Personal details
- Born: Fernando Bustamante Ponce; December 25, 1950 (age 75) New York City, New York, United States
- Party: Ruptura 25 (2004-2006); Alianza PAIS (2006-2017)
- Education: Pontifical Catholic University of Chile; Harvard University; Latin American and Caribbean Institute of Economic and Social Planning

Fernando Xavier Bustamante Ponce is an American-born Ecuadorian politician and academic who served as Minister of the Interior of Ecuador from 2007 to 2009.

== Biography ==
Ponce was born in New York City, New York, United States on December 25, 1950. He studied at the Pontifical Catholic University of Chile in Santiago, Chile, where he obtained a doctorate in sociology. He later earned a master's degree in Economics and Social Planning from Harvard University and completed a diploma in Regional and Urban Planning from the Latin American and Caribbean Institute for Economic and Social Planning.

Ponce was a professor at the Latin American Faculty of Social Sciences and Universidad San Francisco de Quito, where he wrote in favor of individual liberties and against military interference in civil society. At the start of his political career, Ponce was closely aligned with the Ruptura 25 movement. A day after the inauguration of Rafael Correa, on January 16, 2007, Ponce became an advisor on internal security and politics. Several months later, he was appointed Coordinating Minister of Internal and External Security. In November 2007, he assumed the position of interim Minister of the Interior after his predecessor Gustavo Larrea resigned following criticism of his handling of clashes between police and protesters in Orellana Province.

As Interior Minister, Ponce was criticized for his use of force to control protests. In June 2008, Assemblyman Galo Lara called for Ponce's resignation for what he called "brutal, treacherous, and overbearing aggression" by police. In February 2009, Ponce left his ministerial role to run as an assemblyman for Alianza PAIS in that year's elections, where he won a seat. He ran for re-election in 2013, representing District 1 of Pichincha Province.

On December 4, 2015, Ponce was the only member of Alianza PAIS to abstain from voting for a package of constitutional amendments being pushed by his party. His rationale for abstaining was because he was uncomfortable with amendments that dealt with the military in elections and civil service. Ponce was suspended as a member of the party for six months.

At the end of 2016, Ponce resigned as President of the National Assembly's International Relations Committee at the request of his fellow party members. On January 28, he announced his departure from Alianza PAIS, claiming that he had been the victim of harassment and the party could no longer tolerate disagreements. President Correa said that Ponce's decision to leave was "pure vanity".
