= Galo Lara =

Ecuadorian politician

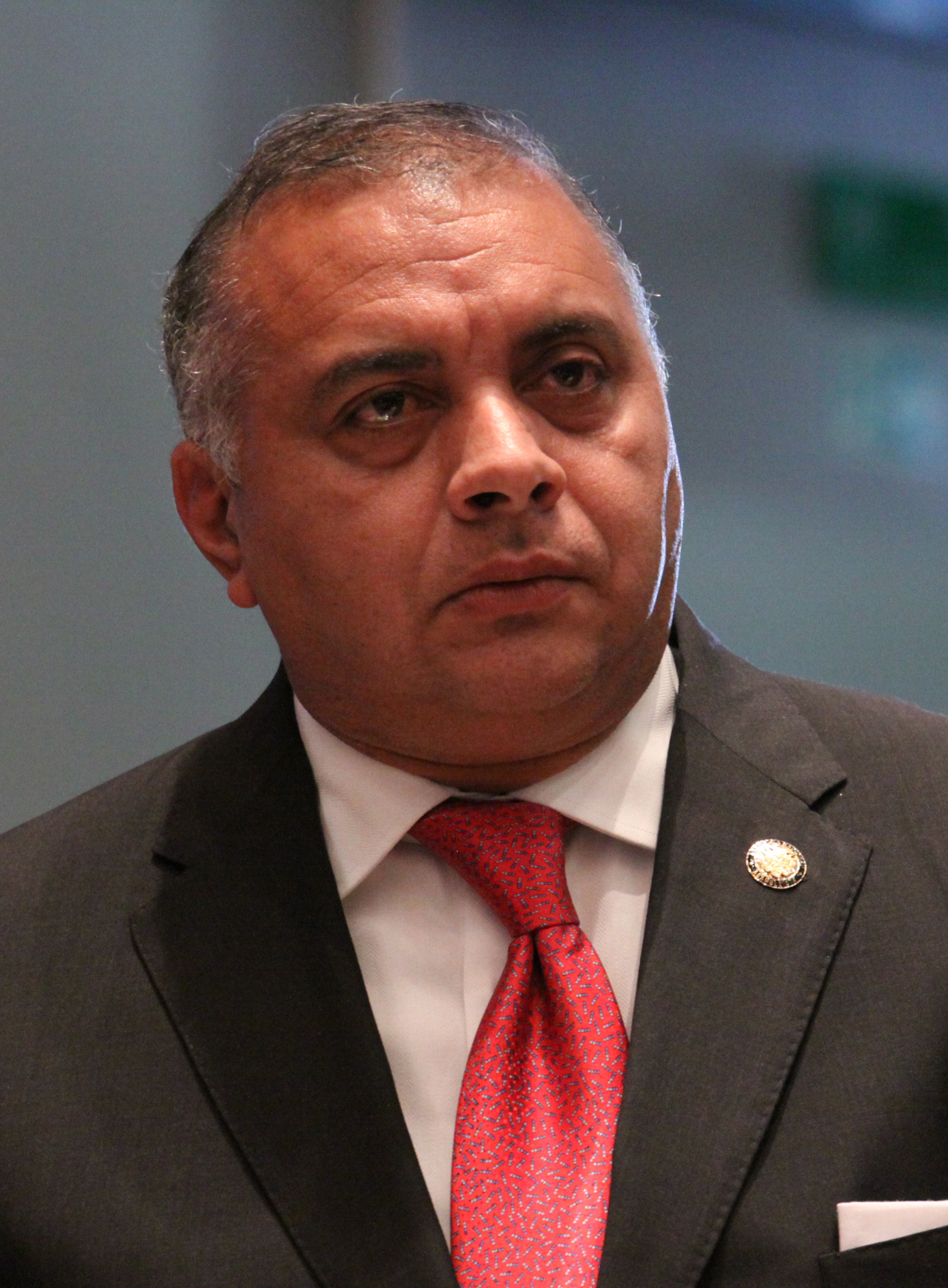
- Lara in 2011

National Assemblyman of Ecuador for Los Rios Province
- In office 2009–2013

Constituent Assemblyman of Ecuador for Los Rios Province
- In office 2007–2008

Personal details
- Born: Tito Galo Lara Yépez; January 4, 1968 (age 58) Quevedo, Los Rios Province, Ecuador

Tito Galo Lara Yépez is an Ecuadorian politician who represented Los Ríos Province in the National Assembly of Ecuador from 2009 to 2013. Lara was convicted of abetting the murder of a couple and their four-year-old child in 2013, and sentenced to ten years in prison by Ecuadorian authorities. Lara fled to Panama, and was eventually declared innocent with his trial being considered a political persecution campaign by the Rafael Correa government.

== Biography ==
Lara was born in Quevedo on January 4, 1968. He was implicated in the death of a woman in Quevedo in 1990, but fled the country before he could go on trial. In 2007, Lara was elected as an assemblyman for Los Rios province in the Patriotic Society Party. He was re-elected in 2008 following the 2008 Ecuadorian constitutional referendum, and stayed as an assemblyman until 2013.

On August 4, 2011, three members of a family were killed in Quinsaloma Canton. The murder was alleged to have been ordered by Lara and his girlfriend. In 2012, a federal prosecutor ordered Lara to remain in the country until the murder investigation was over. Lara was acquitted that December, but his girlfriend was found guilty in the murders. On September 2, 2013, after Lara had already left his office as assemblyman, the National Court of Ecuador convicted Lara of being an accomplice in the murders and sentenced him to ten years in prison.

Lara fled to Panama on October 22, 2013, seeking asylum as a political prisoner. Panama granted asylum to Lara, but revoked his asylum in June 2014. The Ecuadorian government demanded Lara's extradition back to Ecuador, but Lara instead sought to stay as a refugee. Lara was extradited back to Ecuador and served time in prison until 2018. That year, a new court stated that Lara had been accused as part of a political persecution campaign by then-president Rafael Correa.

Lara and his girlfriend Carolina Llanos were declared innocent in 2021 as there was not enough evidence to link the two to the murders. Lara and Llanos received compensation for the campaign in 2021 by Guillermo Lasso.
