= 1967 South American Championships in Athletics =

- Dates: 7–15 October
- Host city: Buenos Aires, Argentina
- Venue: Pista de Atletismo Parque Chacabuco
- Events: 32
- Participation: 250 athletes from 8 nations

The 1967 South American Championships in Athletics were held at the Pista de Atletismo Parque Chacabuco in Buenos Aires, Argentina, between 7 and 15 October.

Hel on a 6-lane cinder track, it required three-rounds of competition in some running events, the last time it happened at the South American Championships. It was also the last edition to allow three athletes from the same country in one event which enabled a clean sweep of medals. In addition, it was the first edition to feature women's 800 metres event.

== Medal summary ==
=== Men's events ===
Event	Gold		Silver		Bronze	
100 metres (wind: +0.2 m/s)	Iván Moreno; Chile	10.4	Jaime Uribe; Colombia	10.5	Fernando Acevedo; Peru	10.5
200 metres (wind: +0.9 m/s)	Pedro Grajales; Colombia	20.9 =CR	Jaime Uribe; Colombia	21.2	Iván Moreno; Chile	21.3
400 metres	Pedro Grajales; Colombia	46.4 CR	Carlos Álvarez; Colombia	47.0	Andrés Calonge; Argentina	47.5
800 metres	Jorge Grosser; Chile	1:51.6	Guillermo Cuello; Argentina	1:52.0	Alejandro Arroyo; Ecuador	1:54.3
1500 metres	Jorge Grosser; Chile	3:52.2	Orlando Gutiérrez; Colombia	3:55.7	Albertino Etchechury; Uruguay	3:56.8
5000 metres	Víctor Mora; Colombia	14:32.2	Osvaldo Suárez; Argentina	14:48.0	Orides Alves; Brazil	14:50.0
10,000 metres	Osvaldo Suárez; Argentina	30:50.8	Víctor Mora; Colombia	30:57.4	Orides Alves; Brazil	31:17.5
Marathon	Armando González; Uruguay	2:35:43 CR	Luis Altamirano; Argentina	2:36:12	Agustín Calle; Colombia	2:39:27
110 metres hurdles (wind: +0.7 m/s)	Alfredo Deza; Peru	14.5 =CR	Carlos Mossa; Brazil	14.7	Juan Carlos Dyrzka; Argentina	14.8
400 metres hurdles	Santiago Gordon; Chile	52.1	Juan Carlos Dyrzka; Argentina	52.3	Guillermo Cuello; Argentina	53.3
3000 metres steeplechase	Domingo Amaisón; Argentina	9:04.8	Albertino Etchechury; Uruguay	9:16.0	Benedito do Amaral; Brazil	9:24.6
4 × 100 metres relay	Colombia; Raúl Sánchez; Jaime Uribe; Carlos Álvarez; Pedro Grajales	41.1	Chile; Jean Pierre Landon; Einar Erlandsen; Iván Moreno; Roberto Quijada	41.8	Brazil; Admilson Chitarra; Affonso da Silva; Andrade Santos; Araken da Costa	41.8
4 × 400 metres relay	Colombia; Migdonio Palacios; Jaime Uribe; Carlos Álvarez; Pedro Grajales	3:14.7	Peru; Fernando Acevedo; Jorge Alemán; Jorge Arriaga; Hurtado	3:15.4	Brazil; Ernani Eisele; Joel Rocha; Juradir Ienne; Guaracy da Silva	3:15.7
High jump	Oscar Canqui; Peru	1.95	Roberto Abugattás; Peru	1.95	Roberto Pozzi; Argentina	1.95
Pole vault	Erico Barney; Argentina	4.30 CR	César Quintero; Colombia	4.30	Ricardo Martens; Argentina	3.80
Long jump	Iván Moreno; Chile	7.35	Alfredo Boncagni; Argentina	7.28	Héctor Rivas; Argentina	6.94
Triple jump	Nelson Prudêncio; Brazil	16.30 CR	Wilson Beneman; Brazil	14.82	Joel Dias; Brazil	14.62
Shot put	José Jacques; Brazil	16.59 CR	Mario Peretti; Argentina	15.52	Manuel Lechuga; Chile	14.73
Discus throw	Dagoberto González; Colombia	54.00 CR	José Jacques; Brazil	49.10	Juan Báez; Argentina	46.84
Hammer throw	José Vallejo; Argentina	58.84 CR	Roberto Chapchap; Brazil	55.08	Lido Crispieri; Chile	52.76
Javelin throw	Álvaro Zucchi; Brazil	66.54	Ian Barney; Argentina	63.20	Rafael Di Fonzo; Argentina	61.92
Decathlon	Juan Carlos Kerwitz; Argentina	6093	Arthur Palma; Brazil	6051	José Jacques; Brazil	6042

=== Women's events ===
Event	Gold		Silver		Bronze	
100 metres (wind: +0.7 m/s)	Silvina Pereira; Brazil	11.8 CR	Irenice Rodrigues; Brazil	12.0	María Cristina Ducci; Chile	12.1
200 metres (wind: +1.6 m/s)	Silvina Pereira; Brazil	24.5	Irenice Rodrigues; Brazil	24.8	María Cristina Ducci; Chile	25.0
800 metres	Carmen Oyé; Chile	2:16.9 CR	Alicia Enríquez; Argentina	2:19.7	Dora González; Chile	2:26.1
80 metres hurdles	Carlota Ulloa; Chile	12.0	Adilia do Rosário; Brazil	12.1	Leda dos Santos; Brazil	12.3
4 × 100 metres relay	Brazil; Silvina Pereira; Aída dos Santos; Maria Cipriano; Irenice Rodrigues	48.2	Uruguay; Josefa Vicent; Alicia Gogluska; Dinorah González; Raquel Amaro	48.5	Argentina; Alicia Masuccio; Graciela Pinto; Alicia Kaufmanas; Liliana Cragno	48.5
High jump	Maria da Conceição; Brazil	1.66	Aída dos Santos; Brazil	1.60	Patricia Miranda; Chile	1.55
Long jump	Irenice Rodrigues; Brazil	5.97 CR	Alicia Kaufmanas; Argentina	5.90	Dinorah González; Uruguay	5.73
Shot put	Rosa Molina; Chile	14.26 AR	Norma Suárez; Argentina	14.14	Neide Gomes; Brazil	11.97
Discus throw	Odete Domingos; Brazil	40.48	Pradelia Delgado; Chile	38.80	María Amaisón; Argentina	36.24
Javelin throw	Kiyomi Nakagawa; Brazil	40.30	Rosa Molina; Chile	39.16	Smiljana Dezulovic; Chile	37.90

== Medal table ==
Rank	Nation	Gold	Silver	Bronze	Total
1	Brazil (BRA)	10	9	9	28
2	Chile (CHI)	8	3	8	19
3	Colombia (COL)	6	6	1	13
4	Argentina (ARG)	5	10	10	25
5	Peru (PER)	2	2	1	5
6	Uruguay (URU)	1	2	2	5
7	Ecuador (ECU)	0	0	1	1
Totals (7 entries)		32	32	32	96

== Participating nations ==
- Argentina (70)
- Brazil (47)
- Chile (42)
- Colombia (15)
- Ecuador (11)
- Paraguay (12)
- Peru (23)
- Uruguay (30)
