= Jacobo Bucaram =

Ecuadorian politician (1947–2024)

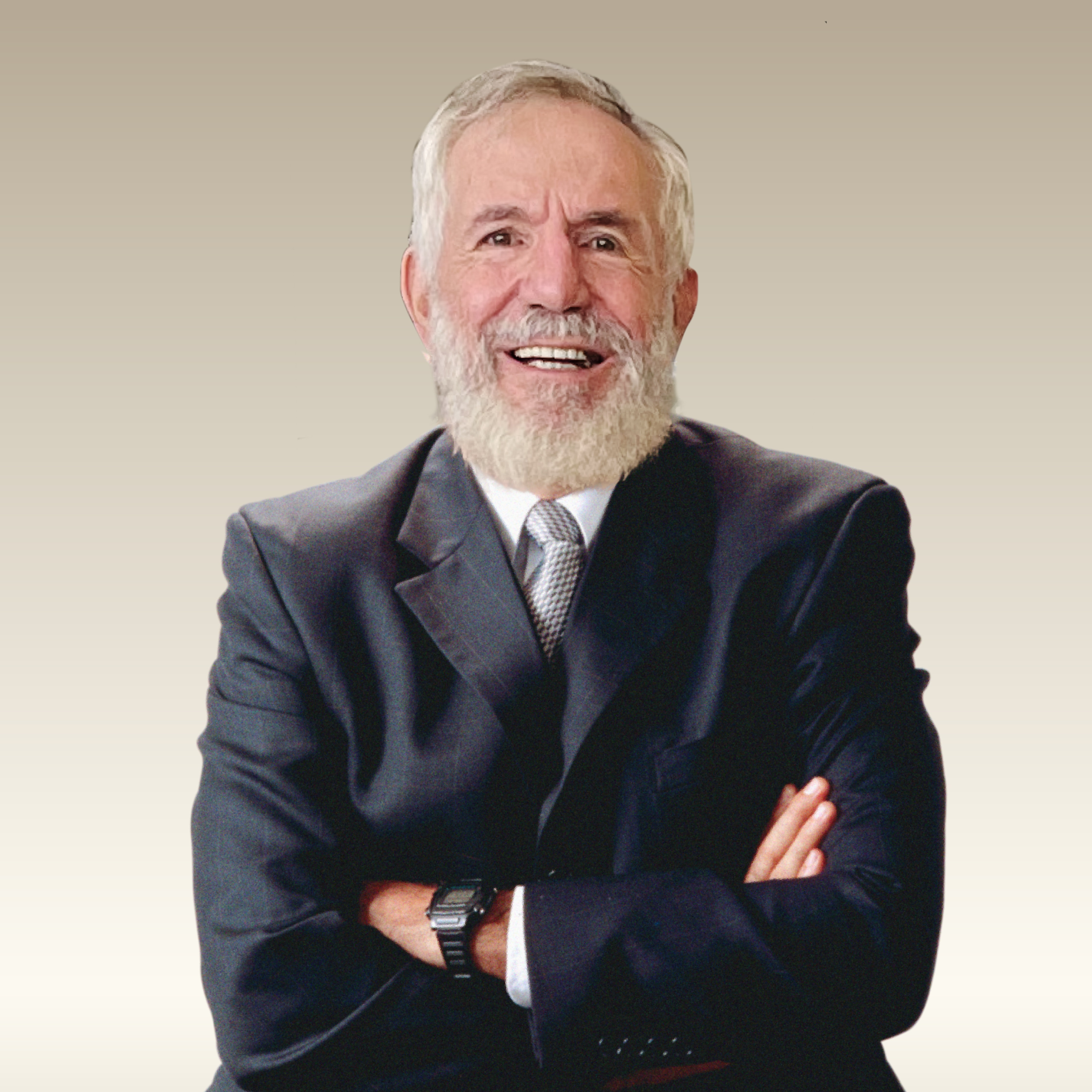
- Bucaram in 2023

Member of the National Congress of Ecuador
- In office 1996–1998
- In office 1988–1994

Personal details
- Born: Jacobo Bucaram Ortiz; 4 August 1947 Guayaquil, Ecuador
- Died: 27 September 2024 (aged 77)
- Party: PRE
- Education: University of Guayaquil
- Occupation: Agronomic engineer

Jacobo Bucaram Ortiz (4 August 1947 – 27 September 2024) was an Ecuadorian agronomic engineer and politician. A member of the Ecuadorian Roldosist Party, he served in the National Congress from 1988 to 1994 and again from 1996 to 1998.

He was the elder brother of former President of Ecuador Abdalá Bucaram and nephew of politician Assad Bucaram.

In his youth he was an athlete competing as a sprinter and hurdler at regional level, including the 1967 Pan American Games. He later served as President of the South American Athletics Confederation (1989–1993), Ecuadorian Athletics Federation, and the Ecuadorian National Olympic Committee (1996–1997).

Bucaram died on 27 September 2024, at the age of 77.
