= 1969 European Athletics Championships – Men's 110 metres hurdles =

Men's 110 metres hurdles at the European Athletics Championships

The men's 110 metres hurdles at the 1969 European Athletics Championships was held in Athens, Greece, at Georgios Karaiskakis Stadium on 18, 19, and 20 September 1969.

== Medalists ==
Gold	Eddy Ottoz; Italy
Silver	David Hemery; Great Britain
Bronze	Alan Pascoe; Great Britain

== Results ==
=== Final ===
20 September Wind: 0.0 m/s

Rank	Name	Nationality	Time	Notes
1st place, gold medalist(s)	Eddy Ottoz	Italy	13.59	CR
2nd place, silver medalist(s)	David Hemery	Great Britain	13.74	
3rd place, bronze medalist(s)	Alan Pascoe	Great Britain	13.94	
4	Guy Drut	France	14.08	
5	Raimund Bethge	East Germany	14.10	
6	Pierre Schoebel	France	14.10	
7	Kjellfred Weum	Norway	14.18	
8	Sergio Liani	Italy	14.19	

=== Semi-finals ===
19 September

==== Semi-final 1 ====
Wind: -1.2 m/s

Rank	Name	Nationality	Time	Notes
1	Eddy Ottoz	Italy	13.8	Q
2	Alan Pascoe	Great Britain	14.0	Q
3	Pierre Schoebel	France	14.0	Q
4	Kjellfred Weum	Norway	14.1	Q
5	Frank Siebeck	East Germany	14.1	
6	Werner Kuhn	Switzerland	14.1	
7	Marek Jóźwik	Poland	14.4	
8	Marco Acerbi	Italy	14.5	

==== Semi-final 2 ====
Wind: -1.2 m/s

Rank	Name	Nationality	Time	Notes
1	David Hemery	Great Britain	13.8	Q
2	Guy Drut	France	13.8	Q
3	Raimund Bethge	East Germany	14.1	Q
4	Sergio Liani	Italy	14.1	Q
5	Håkon Fimland	Norway	14.2	
6	Nicolae Pertea	Romania	14.3	
7	Bo Forssander	Sweden	14.4	
8	Lubomír Nádeníček	Czechoslovakia	14.5	

=== Heats ===
18 September

==== Heat 1 ====
Wind: -2.8 m/s

Rank	Name	Nationality	Time	Notes
1	Guy Drut	France	14.0	Q
2	Alan Pascoe	Great Britain	14.3	Q
3	Kjellfred Weum	Norway	14.5	Q
4	Marco Acerbi	Italy	14.6	Q
5	Wilfried Geeroms	Belgium	14.6	
6	Ari Salin	Finland	14.7	

==== Heat 2 ====
Wind: -2.4 m/s

Rank	Name	Nationality	Time	Notes
1	Eddy Ottoz	Italy	13.8	Q
2	Håkon Fimland	Norway	14.2	Q
3	Nicolae Pertea	Romania	14.3	Q
4	Marek Jóźwik	Poland	14.3	Q
5	Viktor Balikhin	Soviet Union	14.5	
6	Jean-Pierre Corval	France	14.5	
7	Hans van Enkhuizen	Netherlands	15.2	

==== Heat 3 ====
Wind: -2.8 m/s

Rank	Name	Nationality	Time	Notes
1	David Hemery	Great Britain	13.8	Q
2	Werner Kuhn	Switzerland	14.1	Q
3	Frank Siebeck	East Germany	14.1	Q
4	Sergio Liani	Italy	14.2	Q
5	Athanasios Lazaridis	Greece	14.5	
6	Alberto Matos	Portugal	14.6	

==== Heat 4 ====
Wind: -2.6 m/s

Rank	Name	Nationality	Time	Notes
1	Pierre Schoebel	France	14.2	Q
2	Raimund Bethge	East Germany	14.3	Q
3	Bo Forssander	Sweden	14.5	Q
4	Lubomír Nádeníček	Czechoslovakia	14.6	Q
5	Stuart Storey	Great Britain	14.7	

== Participation ==
According to an unofficial count, 24 athletes from 16 countries participated in the event.

- Belgium (1)
- Czechoslovakia (1)
- East Germany (2)
- Finland (1)
- France (3)
- Greece (1)
- Italy (3)
- Netherlands (1)
- Norway (2)
- Poland (1)
- Portugal (1)
- Romania (1)
- Soviet Union (1)
- Sweden (1)
- Switzerland (1)
- Great Britain (3)
