= 1966 European Indoor Games – Men's 60 metres hurdles =

The men's 60 metres hurdles event at the 1966 European Indoor Games was held on 27 March in Dortmund.

== Medalists ==
Gold	Silver	Bronze
Eddy Ottoz; Italy	Mike Parker; Great Britain	Hinrich John; West Germany

== Results ==
=== Heats ===
First 2 from each heat (Q) and the next 6 fastest (q) qualified for the semifinals.

Rank	Heat	Name	Nationality	Time	Notes
1	1	Mike Parker	Great Britain	7.9	Q
2	1	Giovanni Cornacchia	Italy	7.9	Q
3	1	Kjellfred Weum	Norway	7.9	q
4	1	Fiorenzo Marchesi	Switzerland	8.2	q
1	2	Eddy Ottoz	Italy	7.8	Q, WB
2	2	Hinrich John	West Germany	7.9	Q
3	2	Çetin Şahiner	Turkey	8.2	q
4	2	Luc Legros	Belgium	8.4	
1	3	Vyacheslav Skomorokhov	Soviet Union	8.0	Q
2	3	Milan Čečman	Czechoslovakia	8.1	Q
3	3	Milad Petrušić	Yugoslavia	8.2	q
4	3	Sture Fröberg	Sweden	8.2	q
5	3	Hans Nerlich	East Germany	8.3	q

=== Intermediate round ===
Rank	Heat	Name	Nationality	Time	Notes
1	1	Vyacheslav Skomorokhov	Soviet Union	7.9	Q
2	1	Milan Čečman	Czechoslovakia	8.0	Q
3	1	Hans Nerlich	East Germany	8.1	
4	1	Fiorenzo Marchesi	Switzerland	8.2	
5	1	Kjellfred Weum	Norway	12.0	
1	2	Hinrich John	West Germany	7.9	Q
2	2	Mike Parker	Great Britain	7.9	Q
3	2	Sture Fröberg	Sweden	8.0	q
4	2	Milad Petrušić	Yugoslavia	8.0	q
5	2	Çetin Şahiner	Turkey	8.1	

Note: Both Italian runners missed the semifinals. After a protest by Italy was upheld, this round was deemed to be an intermediate round, with the six advancing qualifiers and both Italians running in the semifinals.

=== Semifinals ===
First 3 from each heat (Q) qualified directly for the final.

Rank	Heat	Name	Nationality	Time	Notes
1	1	Eddy Ottoz	Italy	7.7	Q, WB
2	1	Vyacheslav Skomorokhov	Soviet Union	7.9	Q
3	1	Milan Čečman	Czechoslovakia	8.1	Q
4	1	Milad Petrušić	Yugoslavia	8.2	
1	2	Giovanni Cornacchia	Italy	7.9	Q
2	2	Hinrich John	West Germany	7.9	Q
3	2	Mike Parker	Great Britain	8.0	Q
4	2	Sture Fröberg	Sweden	8.2	

=== Final ===
Rank	Lane	Name	Nationality	Time	Notes
1st place, gold medalist(s)	4	Eddy Ottoz	Italy	7.7	=WB
2nd place, silver medalist(s)	2	Mike Parker	Great Britain	7.8	
3rd place, bronze medalist(s)	5	Hinrich John	West Germany	7.9	
4	6	Vyacheslav Skomorokhov	Soviet Union	7.9	
5	1	Giovanni Cornacchia	Italy	7.9	
6	3	Milan Čečman	Czechoslovakia	8.0	
