= 1968 European Indoor Games – Men's 50 metres hurdles =

The men's 50 metres hurdles event at the 1968 European Indoor Games was held on 10 March in Madrid.

== Medalists ==
Gold	Silver	Bronze
Eddy Ottoz; Italy	Günther Nickel; West Germany	Milan Kotik; Czechoslovakia

== Results ==
=== Heats ===
First 4 from each heat (Q) qualified directly for the semifinals.

Rank	Heat	Name	Nationality	Time	Notes
1	3	Eddy Ottoz	Italy	6.64	Q
2	1	Hinrich John	West Germany	6.74	Q
2	2	Alan Pascoe	Great Britain	6.74	Q
4	2	Milan Kotik	Czechoslovakia	6.76	Q
5	2	Kjellfred Weum	Norway	6.82	Q
5	3	Adam Kołodziejczyk	Poland	6.82	Q
7	1	Viktor Balikhin	Soviet Union	6.84	Q
8	3	Valentin Chistyakov	Soviet Union	6.89	Q
9	3	Günther Nickel	West Germany	6.89	Q
10	2	Pierre Schoebel	France	6.92	Q
11	1	Sergio Liani	Italy	6.94	Q
12	3	Dan Hidiosanu	Romania	6.95	
13	1	Patrick Malrieux	France	6.96	Q
12	1	Werner Kuhn	Switzerland	6.99	
13	2	Rafael Cano	Spain	7.02	

=== Semifinals ===
First 3 from each heat (Q) qualified directly for the final.

Rank	Heat	Name	Nationality	Time	Notes
1	2	Eddy Ottoz	Italy	6.62	Q
2	2	Milan Kotik	Czechoslovakia	6.72	Q
3	1	Günther Nickel	West Germany	6.73	Q
4	1	Adam Kołodziejczyk	Poland	6.73	Q
5	1	Valentin Chistyakov	Soviet Union	6.76	Q
5	2	Viktor Balikhin	Soviet Union	6.76	Q
7	1	Alan Pascoe	Great Britain	6.78	
8	2	Hinrich John	West Germany	6.79	
9	2	Kjellfred Weum	Norway	6.80	
10	1	Patrick Malrieux	France	6.84	
11	1	Sergio Liani	Italy	6.86	
	2	Pierre Schoebel	France	DNF	

=== Final ===
Rank	Name	Nationality	Time	Notes
1st place, gold medalist(s)	Eddy Ottoz	Italy	6.52	WB
2nd place, silver medalist(s)	Günther Nickel	West Germany	6.68	
3rd place, bronze medalist(s)	Milan Kotik	Czechoslovakia	6.73	
4	Adam Kołodziejczyk	Poland	6.78	
5	Viktor Balikhin	Soviet Union	6.79	
6	Valentin Chistyakov	Soviet Union	6.95	
