= 1966 European Athletics Championships – Men's 110 metres hurdles =

Men's 110 metres hurdles at the European Athletics Championships

British Pathe Highlights, this race @ 1:40 on YouTube

The men's 110 metres hurdles at the 1966 European Athletics Championships was held in Budapest, Hungary, at Népstadion on 2, 3, and 4 September 1966.

== Medalists ==
| Gold | Eddy Ottoz; Italy |
| Silver | Heinrich John; West Germany |
| Bronze | Marcel Duriez; France |

== Results ==
=== Final ===
4 September Wind: -0.2 m/s

| Rank | Name | Nationality | Time | Notes |
|---|---|---|---|---|
| 1st place, gold medalist(s) | Eddy Ottoz | Italy | 13.7 | CR |
| 2nd place, silver medalist(s) | Heinrich John | West Germany | 14.0 | |
| 3rd place, bronze medalist(s) | Marcel Duriez | France | 14.0 | |
| 4 | Anatoliy Mikhailov | Soviet Union | 14.1 | |
| 5 | Giovanni Cornacchia | Italy | 14.2 | |
| 6 | Sergio Liani | Italy | 14.2 | |
| 7 | Vyacheslav Skomorokhov | Soviet Union | 14.2 | |
| 8 | Bo Forssander | Sweden | 14.3 | |

=== Semi-finals ===
3 September

==== Semi-final 1 ====
Wind: -1.6 m/s

| Rank | Name | Nationality | Time | Notes |
|---|---|---|---|---|
| 1 | Eddy Ottoz | Italy | 13.7 | CR Q |
| 2 | Marcel Duriez | France | 14.0 | Q |
| 3 | Anatoliy Mikhailov | Soviet Union | 14.1 | Q |
| 4 | Sergio Liani | Italy | 14.1 | Q |
| 5 | David Hemery | Great Britain | 14.2 | |
| 6 | Milan Čečman | Czechoslovakia | 14.4 | |
| 7 | Werner Trzmiel | West Germany | 14.5 | |
| 8 | Fiorenzo Marchesi | Switzerland | 14.9 | |

==== Semi-final 2 ====
Wind: 0 m/s

| Rank | Name | Nationality | Time | Notes |
|---|---|---|---|---|
| 1 | Heinrich John | West Germany | 14.1 | Q |
| 2 | Vyacheslav Skomorokhov | Soviet Union | 14.1 | Q |
| 3 | Giovanni Cornacchia | Italy | 14.1 | Q |
| 4 | Bo Forssander | Sweden | 14.2 | Q |
| 5 | Viktor Balikhin | Soviet Union | 14.3 | |
| 6 | Pierre Schoebel | France | 14.5 | |
| 7 | Adam Kołodziejczyk | Poland | 14.5 | |
| 8 | Laurie Taitt | Great Britain | 14.5 | |

=== Heats ===
2 September

==== Heat 1 ====
Wind: 0 m/s

| Rank | Name | Nationality | Time | Notes |
|---|---|---|---|---|
| 1 | Eddy Ottoz | Italy | 13.8 | Q |
| 2 | David Hemery | Great Britain | 14.1 | Q |
| 3 | Viktor Balikhin | Soviet Union | 14.4 | Q |
| 4 | Adam Kołodziejczyk | Poland | 14.5 | Q |
| 5 | Michel Chardel | France | 14.6 | |
| 6 | Ilia Mazniku | Albania | 15.7 | |

==== Heat 2 ====
Wind: 0 m/s

| Rank | Name | Nationality | Time | Notes |
|---|---|---|---|---|
| 1 | Bo Forssander | Sweden | 14.0 | Q |
| 2 | Vyacheslav Skomorokhov | Soviet Union | 14.1 | Q |
| 3 | Pierre Schoebel | France | 14.3 | Q |
| 4 | Milan Čečman | Czechoslovakia | 14.4 | Q |
| 5 | Mike Parker | Great Britain | 14.6 | |
| 6 | Athanasios Lazaridis | Greece | 14.7 | |
| 7 | Çetin Şahiner | Turkey | 15.0 | |

==== Heat 3 ====
Wind: -0.1 m/s

| Rank | Name | Nationality | Time | Notes |
|---|---|---|---|---|
| 1 | Heinrich John | West Germany | 14.0 | Q |
| 2 | Sergio Liani | Italy | 14.5 | Q |
| 3 | Laurie Taitt | Great Britain | 14.7 | Q |
| 4 | Fiorenzo Marchesi | Switzerland | 14.7 | Q |
| 5 | Wilfried Geeroms | Belgium | 14.8 | |

==== Heat 4 ====
Wind: -0.1 m/s

| Rank | Name | Nationality | Time | Notes |
|---|---|---|---|---|
| 1 | Marcel Duriez | France | 14.1 | Q |
| 2 | Vadim Mikhailov | Soviet Union | 14.2 | Q |
| 3 | Giovanni Cornacchia | Italy | 14.3 | Q |
| 4 | Werner Trzmiel | West Germany | 14.3 | Q |
| 5 | Klaus Schiess | Switzerland | 14.7 | |
| 6 | Béla Mélykúti | Hungary | 15.2 | |

== Participation ==
According to an unofficial count, 25 athletes from 14 countries participated in the event.

- Albania (1)
- Belgium (1)
- Czechoslovakia (1)
- France (3)
- Greece (1)
- Hungary (1)
- Italy (3)
- Poland (1)
- Soviet Union (4)
- Sweden (1)
- Switzerland (2)
- Turkey (1)
- Great Britain (3)
- West Germany (2)
