= Athletics at the 1968 Summer Olympics – Men's 110 metres hurdles =

Men's 110 metres hurdles at the Games of the XIX Olympiad
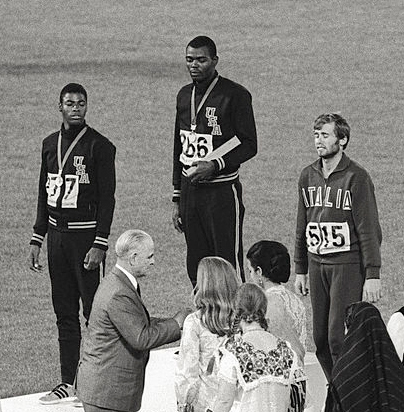
- Willie Davenport, Ervin Hall and Eddy Ottoz
- Venue: Estadio Olímpico Universitario
- Date: October 16–17, 1968
- Competitors: 33 from 24 nations
- Winning time: 13.3

Medalists
| 1st place, gold medalist(s) | | Willie Davenport; United States |
| 2nd place, silver medalist(s) | | Ervin Hall; United States |
| 3rd place, bronze medalist(s) | | Eddy Ottoz; Italy |

Official Video Highlights @6:20

The men's 110 metres hurdles competition at the 1968 Summer Olympics in Mexico City, Mexico was held at the University Olympic Stadium on October 16–17. Thirty-three athletes from 24 nations competed. The maximum number of athletes per nation had been set at 3 since the 1930 Olympic Congress. The event was won by Willie Davenport of the United States, the nation's eighth of nine consecutive victories and the 14th overall gold medal in the event for the Americans. Eddy Ottoz's bronze was Italy's first medal in the event.

== Background ==
This was the 16th appearance of the event, which is one of 12 athletics events to have been held at every Summer Olympics. Three finalists from 1964 returned: fourth-place finisher Eddy Ottoz of Italy, sixth-place finisher Marcel Duriez of France, and seventh-place finisher Giovanni Cornacchia, also of Italy. The American team, including Willie Davenport (whose injury in Tokyo had ended a streak of four consecutive podium sweeps), Ervin Hall, and Leon Coleman, was again favored.

The Dominican Republic, Madagascar, and the Virgin Islands each made their first appearance in the event; West Germany made its first appearance as a separate nation. The United States made its 16th appearance, the only nation to have competed in the 110 metres hurdles in each Games to that point.

== Competition format ==
The men's 110m hurdles competition consisted of heats (Round 1), semifinals and a final. The three fastest competitors from each race in the heats qualified for the semifinals along with the fastest overall competitor not already qualified. The four fastest runners from each of the two semifinal races advanced to the final.

== Records ==
These were the standing world and Olympic records (in seconds) prior to the 1968 Summer Olympics.

| World record | Martin Lauer (FRG) | 13.2 | Zürich, Switzerland | 7 July 1959 |
| Olympic record | Lee Calhoun (USA) | 13.5 | Melbourne, Australia | 28 November 1956 |

Eddy Ottoz matched the Olympic record in the third heat. He did it again in the first semifinal, but came in second in that race—Ervin Hall set a new Olympic record at 13.3 seconds. Willie Davenport matched Hall's new record to win the final; all three men came in under the old record in winning their medals. Ottoz's final time was a national record for Italy.

| Nation | Athlete | Round | Time |
|---|---|---|---|
| Italy | Eddy Ottoz | Final | 13.4 |

== Schedule ==
All times are Central Standard Time (UTC-6)

| Date | Time | Round |
|---|---|---|
| Wednesday, 16 October 1968 | 10:00 | Round 1 |
| Thursday, 17 October 1968 | 15:00; 17:00 | Semifinals; Final |

== Results ==
=== Round 1 ===
==== Heat 1 ====
| Rank | Lane | Athlete | Nation | Time (hand) | Time (auto) | Notes |
|---|---|---|---|---|---|---|
| 1 | 6 | Ervin Hall | United States | 13.7 | 13.75 | Q |
| 2 | 7 | Pierre Schoebel | France | 13.8 | 13.83 | Q |
| 3 | 3 | Daniel Riedo | Switzerland | 14.0 | 14.10 | Q |
| 4 | 5 | Giovanni Cornacchia | Italy | 14.1 | 14.13 | |
| 5 | 2 | Franklin Blyden | Virgin Islands | 14.7 | 14.74 | |
| 6 | 4 | Kimaru Songok | Kenya | 14.7 | 14.76 | |
| — | 1 | Bernard Kender | Chad | DNS | | |
| | | | | Wind: 0.0 m/s | | |

==== Heat 2 ====
| Rank | Lane | Athlete | Nation | Time (hand) | Time (auto) | Notes |
|---|---|---|---|---|---|---|
| 1 | 7 | Willie Davenport | United States | 13.6 | 13.65 | Q |
| 2 | 5 | Hinrich John | West Germany | 13.8 | 13.87 | Q |
| 3 | 4 | Arnaldo Bristol | Puerto Rico | 13.9 | 13.92 | Q |
| 4 | 1 | Oleg Stepanenko | Soviet Union | 13.9 | 13.95 | q |
| 5 | 3 | Hernando Arrechea | Colombia | 14.0 | 14.09 | |
| 6 | 6 | Ahmed Ishtiaq Mubarak | Malaysia | 14.3 | 14.36 | |
| 7 | 2 | Su Po-tai | Taiwan | 15.0 | 15.11 | |
| | | | | Wind: +1.0 m/s | | |

==== Heat 3 ====
| Rank | Lane | Athlete | Nation | Time (hand) | Time (auto) | Notes |
|---|---|---|---|---|---|---|
| 1 | 4 | Eddy Ottoz | Italy | 13.5 | 13.61 | Q, =OR |
| 2 | 7 | Werner Trzmiel | West Germany | 13.8 | 13.87 | Q |
| 3 | 6 | Juan Morales | Cuba | 13.9 | 13.94 | Q |
| 4 | 3 | Gary Knoke | Australia | 14.1 | 14.14 | |
| 5 | 5 | Stuart Storey | Great Britain | 14.1 | 14.20 | |
| 6 | 2 | Simbara Maki | Ivory Coast | 14.3 | 14.32 | |
| 7 | 1 | Fernand Tovondray | Madagascar | 14.9 | 15.00 | |
| | | | | Wind: +1.7 m/s | | |

==== Heat 4 ====
| Rank | Lane | Athlete | Nation | Time (hand) | Time (auto) | Notes |
|---|---|---|---|---|---|---|
| 1 | 7 | Leon Coleman | United States | 13.7 | 13.77 | Q |
| 2 | 6 | Bo Forssander | Sweden | 13.9 | 14.00 | Q |
| 3 | 2 | Kjellfred Weum | Norway | 14.0 | 14.08 | Q |
| 4 | 5 | Mike Parker | Great Britain | 14.1 | 14.16 | |
| 5 | 3 | Patricio Saavedra | Chile | 14.4 | 14.47 | |
| 6 | 1 | Rogelio Onofre | Philippines | 15.0 | 15.01 | |
| — | 4 | Werner Kuhn | Switzerland | DNS | | |
| | | | | Wind: +0.3 m/s | | |

==== Heat 5 ====
| Rank | Lane | Athlete | Nation | Time (hand) | Time (auto) | Notes |
|---|---|---|---|---|---|---|
| 1 | 2 | Viktor Balikhin | Soviet Union | 13.8 | 13.82 | Q |
| 2 | 6 | Marcel Duriez | France | 13.9 | 14.00 | Q |
| 3 | 5 | Sergio Liani | Italy | 13.9 | 14.01 | Q |
| 4 | 4 | Alan Pascoe | Great Britain | 13.9 | 14.01 | |
| 5 | 1 | Lubomír Nádeníček | Czechoslovakia | 14.1 | 14.18 | |
| 6 | 7 | Alfredo Deza | Peru | 14.3 | 14.38 | |
| 7 | 3 | Radhamés Mora | Dominican Republic | 16.8 | 16.85 | |
| | | | | Wind: 0.0 m/s | | |

=== Semifinals ===
==== Semifinal 1 ====
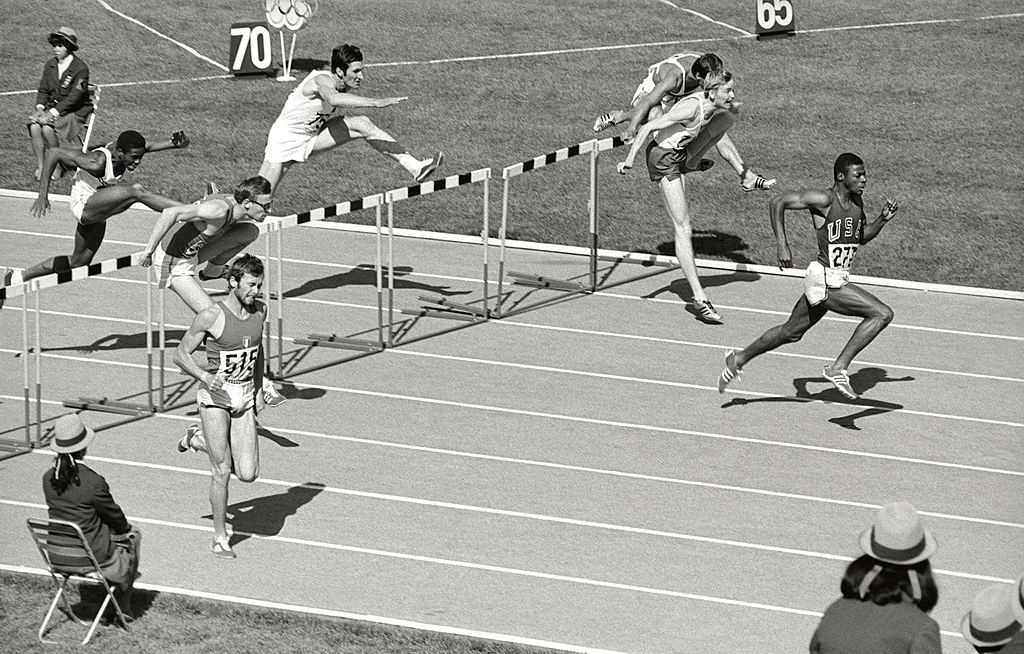
Last meters of the first semi-final. Eddy Ottoz, number 515, finishes second; the other racers, from the left, Juan Morales, Pierre Schoebel, Daniel Riedo, Hinrich John, Bo Forssander and the winner, Ervin Hall.

| Rank | Lane | Athlete | Nation | Time (hand) | Time (auto) | Notes |
|---|---|---|---|---|---|---|
| 1 | 4 | Ervin Hall | United States | 13.3 | 13.38 | Q, OR |
| 2 | 8 | Eddy Ottoz | Italy | 13.5 | 13.53 | Q |
| 3 | 2 | Bo Forssander | Sweden | 13.7 | 13.75 | Q |
| 4 | 6 | Pierre Schoebel | France | 13.7 | 13.78 | Q |
| 5 | 1 | Hinrich John | West Germany | 13.8 | 13.87 | |
| 6 | 3 | Daniel Riedo | Switzerland | 14.0 | 14.07 | |
| 7 | 5 | Juan Morales | Cuba | 14.0 | 14.08 | |
| 8 | 7 | Viktor Balikhin | Soviet Union | 14.1 | 14.13 | |
| | | | | Wind: +1.8 m/s | | |

==== Semifinal 2 ====
| Rank | Lane | Athlete | Nation | Time (hand) | Time (auto) | Notes |
|---|---|---|---|---|---|---|
| 1 | 5 | Willie Davenport | United States | 13.5 | 13.53 | Q |
| 2 | 6 | Leon Coleman | United States | 13.5 | 13.54 | Q |
| 3 | 1 | Werner Trzmiel | West Germany | 13.5 | 13.60 | Q |
| 4 | 4 | Marcel Duriez | France | 13.7 | 13.73 | Q |
| 5 | 8 | Oleg Stepanenko | Soviet Union | 13.8 | 13.83 | |
| 6 | 3 | Kjellfred Weum | Norway | 14.0 | 14.04 | |
| 7 | 2 | Sergio Liani | Italy | 14.0 | 14.09 | |
| 8 | 7 | Arnaldo Bristol | Puerto Rico | 14.1 | 14.13 | |
| | | | | Wind: 0.0 m/s | | |

=== Final ===
| Rank | Lane | Athlete | Nation | Time (hand) | Time (auto) | Notes |
|---|---|---|---|---|---|---|
| 1st place, gold medalist(s) | 4 | Willie Davenport | United States | 13.3 | 13.33 | =OR |
| 2nd place, silver medalist(s) | 6 | Ervin Hall | United States | 13.4 | 13.42 | |
| 3rd place, bronze medalist(s) | 3 | Eddy Ottoz | Italy | 13.4 | 13.46 | NR |
| 4 | 7 | Leon Coleman | United States | 13.6 | 13.67 | |
| 5 | 1 | Werner Trzmiel | West Germany | 13.6 | 13.68 | |
| 6 | 2 | Bo Forssander | Sweden | 13.7 | 13.73 | |
| 7 | 8 | Marcel Duriez | France | 13.7 | 13.77 | |
| 8 | 5 | Pierre Schoebel | France | 14.0 | 14.02 | |
| | | | | Wind: 0.0 m/s | | |
