= Gabre Gabric =

Dalmatian Italian athlete

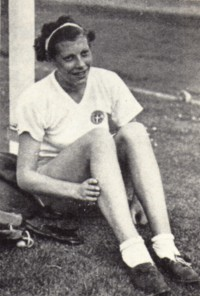

Personal information
- Full name: Ljubica Gabrić-Calvesi
- National team: Italy: 22 caps (1936-1955)
- Born: 17 October 1914 Imotski, Kingdom of Dalmatia, Austria-Hungary
- Died: 16 December 2015 (aged 101) Brescia, Italy

Sport
- Sport: Athletics
- Event: Discus throw
- Club: Venchi Unica Torino (senior); Atletica Calvesi (masters)

Achievements and titles
- Personal best: Discus throw: 43.35 m (1939)

Ljubica Gabrić-Calvesi (17 October 1914 – 16 December 2015), known as Gabre Gabric, was a Dalmatian Italian track and field athlete who competed in the 1936 Summer Olympics and in the 1948 Summer Olympics. Her best discus throw was 43.35 m (1939).

== Biography ==
Ljubica Gabrić was born in Imotski, Croatia (then part of Austria-Hungary). She was wife of Sandro Calvesi, an Italian athletic coach (hurdles), and mother-in-law of Eddy Ottoz (grandmother of Laurent Ottoz and Patrick Ottoz).

While many sources give a birth year of 1914 and she competed in masters-level tournaments with this year of birth, Gabrić claimed in an interview that she was born in 1917 and that 1914 was a transcription error: however, this admission is in contradiction with additional sources, including her arrival in the United States at age 9 in 1923, documented by Ellis Island records and the fact that Olympic documents dating to the 1936 and 1948 Olympics establish a birthdate of 17 October 1914, probably originating from her own answers at the time.

In 1936, she finished tenth in the Olympic discus throw event. Twelve years later she finished 17th in the discus throw competition at the 1948 Olympics. In the 1938 European Championships in Athletics she finished sixth in the discus throw contest and in the 1950 European Championships in Athletics she finished seventh in the discus throw event. Records from the European Championships use the 1917 birthdate, reporting her as a 20 year old and 32 year old respectively.

In 2010, she was still competing in Veterans Athletic Championships and, following the 2011 death of Alfred Proksch, was the last known track and field competitor from the 1936 Olympic Games to still be competing. At the 2010 European Veterans Athletics Championships in Nyíregyháza, Hungary, she set the current W95 World Records in the Shot Put and the Discus.

Gabrić died on 16 December 2015, aged 101.

== Masters world records ==
Gabric held four world records in masters W95 category (athletes who have completed the ninety-fifth year of age), records regularly recognized by the International Governing Body, World Masters Athletics. This is because for the World Masters Athletics and FIDAL (Italian athletics federation), recognize the birthdate of 1914.

Event	Category	Performance	Date	Venue	Notes
Shot put	W 95	5.32 m	23 July 2010	(Hungary) Nyíregyháza	
Hammer throw	W 95	12.86 m	21 July 2010	(Hungary) Nyíregyháza	
Weight throw	W 95	4.67 m	9 October 2010	(Italy) Macerata	
Throws pentathlon	W 95	3.923 pt	9 October 2010	(Italy) Macerata	

== Achievements ==
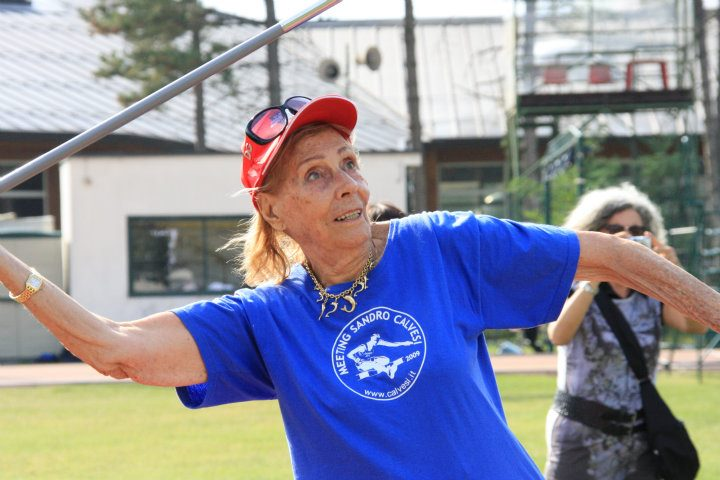
Gabric in 2011 at 97 when she was a master athlete.

Senior

Year	Competition	Venue	Event	Position	Performance	Notes
1936	Olympic Games	(Nazi Germany) Berlin	Discus throw	10th	34.31 m	
1938	European Championships	(Austria) Vienna	Discus throw	6th	35.53 m	
1948	Olympic Games	(United Kingdom) London	Discus throw	17th	34.17 m	
1950	European Championships	(Belgium) Brussels	Discus throw	7th	37.73 m	

Masters

Year	Competition	Venue	Event	Position	Performance	Notes
2007	World Masters Championships	(Italy) Riccione	Shot put W90	1st	4.35 m	
2007	World Masters Championships	(Italy) Riccione	Discus throw W90	1st	11.45 m	
2007	World Masters Championships	(Italy) Riccione	Javelin throw W90	2nd	6.93 m	
2008	World Masters Indoor Championships	(France) Clermont-Ferrand	Shot put W90	1st	4.73 m	
2008	World Masters Indoor Championships	(France) Clermont-Ferrand	Discus throw W90	1st	11.49 m	
2008	World Masters Indoor Championships	(France) Clermont-Ferrand	Javelin throw W90	1st	6.87 m	
2009	World Masters Championships	(Finland) Lahti	Shot put W90	2nd	4.73 m	
2009	World Masters Championships	(Finland) Lahti	Discus throw W90	2nd	12.55 m	
2009	World Masters Championships	(Finland) Lahti	Javelin throw W90	2nd	7.36 m	
2008	European Masters Championships	(Slovenia) Ljubljana	Shot put W90	1st	4.73 m	
2008	European Masters Championships	(Slovenia) Ljubljana	Discus throw W90	1st	11.86 m	
2008	European Masters Championships	(Slovenia) Ljubljana	Javelin throw W90	1st	7.97 m	
2009	European Masters Indoor Championships	(Italy) Ancona	Shot put W90	1st	4.72 m	
2009	European Masters Indoor Championships	(Italy) Ancona	Discus throw W90	1st	12,02 m	
2009	European Masters Indoor Championships	(Italy) Ancona	Javelin throw W90	1st	7.85 m	
2010	European Masters Championships	(Hungary) Nyíregyháza	Shot put W95	1st	5.32 m	WR
2010	European Masters Championships	(Hungary) Nyíregyháza	Discus throw W95	1st	12.86 m	WR
2010	European Masters Championships	(Hungary) Nyíregyháza	Javelin throw W95	1st	7.92 m	

== See also ==
- List of world records in masters athletics
- Ottoz family
