= Ottoz family =

Italian sporting family

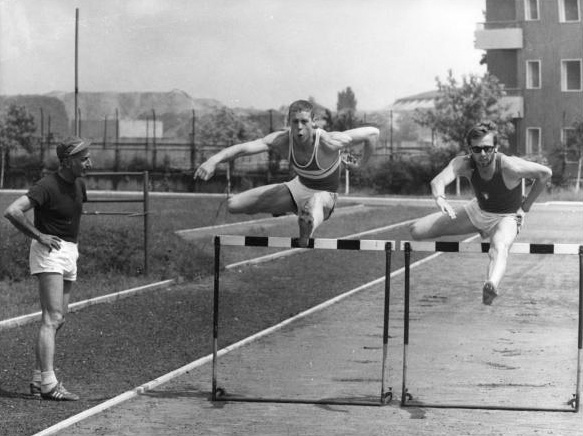
Sandro Calvesi (left) coach of Guy Drut (center) and son-in-law, Eddy Ottoz (Brescia, Italy 1969)

The Ottoz family is a sporting family consisting of many athletes, one of whom became a manager in the world of athletics.

Sandro Calvesi (1913–1980), the capostipite of the Calvesi family, coached the Italian hurdler Eddy Ottoz (born 1944), who afterwards became his son-in-law through his marriage with Lyana Calvesi. Calvesi was also the first coach of French Olympic champion Guy Drut. He was also the promoter of the athletic club, Atletica Brescia.

== History ==
Calvesi's wife was Gabre Gabric, a former athlete who participated at 1936 Summer Olympics and 1948 Summer Olympics. In 1936 she finished tenth in the Olympic discus throw event. Twelve years later she finished 17th in the discus throw competition at the 1948 Olympics. At the 1938 European Athletics Championships she finished sixth in the discus throw contest and at the 1946 European Athletics Championships she finished seventh in the discus throw event. In 2008 she competed at the Veterans Athletic Championships and, following the 2011 death of Alfred Proksch, was the last known track and field competitor from the 1936 Olympic Games to still be competing.

Gabre Gabric's daughter, Lyana Calvesi (born 1944), is a former athlete who afterward assumed the role of manager of several Masters athletics teams and before founding the athletic master club, Atletica Calvesi. She married Eddy Ottoz, a former Italian hurdler (bronze medal in 1968 Summer Olympics and 5 times European champion) before becoming the manager of the Italian National Olympic Committee from 2001. He represented Italy at the 1964 Summer Olympics held in Tokyo, Japan, and the 1968 Summer Olympics held in Mexico City, Mexico, where he won the bronze medal in the 110-metre hurdles event.

The couple had three children. Laurent Ottoz (born 1970) is a former Italian hurdler and member of FIDAL committee. In 1994 26 years after his father, Laurent Ottoz, broke the national record by completing the 110 metres hurdles in 13:42 seconds in Berlin. After this he changed event to the 400 metres hurdles. His personal best time is 48:52 seconds, and in Italy only Fabrizio Mori has a better record. In 1995, Laurent set the fastest automatically recorded time for the rarely run 200 metres low hurdles at 22.55, surpassing the best previously set by Colin Jackson, arguable the best hurdler of that time. His mark is current world best performance. Patrick Ottoz (born 1971) is a former Italian hurdler, while Pilar Ottoz (born 1972), is a former Italian athlete who became a journalist with the Italian public broadcaster, RAI.

== The Borlée family inspired by the Ottoz family ==
In an interview of 21 August 2013 released to the major Italian sports newspaper, La Gazzetta dello Sport, Jacques Borlée stated that he was inspired by his training methods to Sandro Calvesi, in turn the progenitor of one of the greatest families of Italian athletics, the Ottoz family. Calvesi was in fact the husband of the Berlin Olympian 1936 Gabre Gabric, father-in-law of the Olympic bronze medalist in the 110 m hs in Mexico City 1968, Eddy Ottoz and father of Lyana Calvesi, current president of the Atletica Calvesi club and coach of the sprinter Eleonora Marchiando.

== International competitions ==
Year	Competition	Venue	Position	Event	Notes
Eddy Ottoz
1965	Universiade	Budapest, Hungary	1st	110 m hurdles	
1966	European Indoor Games	Dortmund, West Germany	1st	60 m hurdles	
1966	European Championships	Budapest, Hungary	1st	110 m hurdles	
1967	European Indoor Games	Prague, Czechoslovakia	1st	50 m hurdles	
1967	Universiade	Tokyo, Japan	1st	110 m hurdles	
1968	European Indoor Games	Madrid, Spain	1st	50 m hurdles	
1968	Olympic Games	Mexico City, Mexico	3rd	110 m hurdles	
1969	European Championships	Athens, Greece	1st	110 m hurdles	
Laurent Ottoz
1997	Mediterranean Games	Bari, Italy	2nd	400 m hurdles	
2001	Mediterranean Games	Tunis, Tunisia	3rd	400 m hurdles	
2005	Mediterranean Games	Almería, Spain	2nd	400 m hurdles	
Gabre Gabric
2007	World Masters Championships	Riccione, Italy	1st	Shot put W90	
2007	World Masters Championships	Riccione, Italy	1st	Discus throw W90	
2007	World Masters Championships	Riccione, Italy	2nd	Javelin throw W90	
2009	World Masters Championships	Lahti, finland	2nd	Shot put W90	
2009	World Masters Championships	Lahti, finland	2nd	Discus throw W90	
2009	World Masters Championships	Lahti, finland	2nd	Javelin throw W90	

== Records ==
Members of the Ottoz family set three records at the Olympiastadion in Berlin. At the 1936 Summer Olympic Games, Gabre Gabric, with her 10th place established the Italian record in discus throw. Twenty-eight years later in 1964, her son, Eddy Ottoz established the first Italian record of his career in the 110 meter hurdles with a time of 13:9 seconds and, 30 years later in 1994, Gabric's grandson Laurent Ottoz, broke the national record of his own father Eddy, running the 110-metre hurdles in 13:42 seconds.
