= List of judges of the Federal Administrative Court of Switzerland =

This is a list of judges of the Federal Administrative Court of Switzerland.

== Division I: Infrastructure, Finance and Personnel ==
Name	Term of office	Party	Notes
Lorenz Kneubühler	2007-2012	SPS/PSS	Division president
Christoph Bandli	2007-2012	SVP/UDC	President of the Court, 2007–08
Florence Aubry Girardin	2007-2012	GPS/PES	
Michael Beusch	2007-2012	SPS/PSS	
Kathrin Dietrich	2007-2012	CVP/PDC	
Beat Forster	2007-2012	CVP/PDC	
Jürg Kölliker	2007-2012	SPS/PSS	
Pierre Leu	2007-2012	SPS/PSS	
Markus Metz	2007-2012	FDP/PRD	
Pascal Mollard	2007-2012	SPS/PSS	
André Moser	2007-2012	FDP/PRD	
Claudia Pasqualetto Péquignot	2007-2012	FDP/PRD	
Daniel Riedo	2007-2012	GPS/PES	
Marianne Ryter Sauvant	2007-2012	SPS/PSS	
Thomas Stadelmann	2007-2012	CVP/PDC	
Salome Zimmermann	2007-2012	SPS/PSS	

== Division II: Economy, Education and Competition ==
Name	Term of office	Party	Notes
Bernard Maitre	2007-2012	CVP/PDC	Division president
Maria Amgwerd	2007-2012	CVP/PDC	
David Aschmann	2007-2012	FDP/PRD	
Jean-Luc Baechler	2007-2012	SVP/UDC	
Stephan Breitenmoser	2007-2012	CVP/PDC	
Francesco Brentani	2007-2012	CVP/PDC	
Ronald Flury	2007-2012	FDP/PRD	
Hans-Jacob Heitz	2007-2012	FDP/PRD	
Vera Marantelli	2007-2012	FDP/PRD	
Claude Morvant	2007-2012	FDP/PRD	
Eva Schneeberger	2007-2012	FDP/PRD	
Frank Seethaler	2007-2012	GPS/PES	
Marc Steiner	2007-2012	SPS/PSS	
Hans Urech	2007-2012	SVP/UDC	Originally elected as first president of the Court; resigned from this position on 9 March 2006 for health reasons.
Philippe Weissenberger	2007-2012	SPS/PSS	Vice president of the Court, 2007–08

== Division III: Foreigners, Health and Social Security ==
Name	Term of office	Party	Notes
Alberto Meuli	2007-2012	SVP/UDC	Division President
Eduard Achermann	2007-2012	SVP/UDC	
Elena Avenati-Carpani	2007-2012	CVP/PDC	
Ruth Beutler	2007-2012	SPS/PSS	
Johannes Frölicher	2007-2012	SPS/PSS	
Antonio Imoberdorf	2007-2012	SPS/PSS	
Stefan Mesmer	2007-2012	SPS/PSS	
Francesco Parrino	2007-2012	SPS/PSS	
Michael Peterli	2007-2012	GPS/PES	
Franziska Schneider	2007-2012	GPS/PES	
Andreas Trommer	2007-2012	FDP/PRD	
Bernard Vaudan	2007-2012	CVP/PDC	
Blaise Vuille	2007-2012	FDP/PRD	

== Division IV: Asylum Law ==
Name	Term of office	Party	Notes
Claudia Cotting-Schalch	2007-2012	FDP/PRD	Division president
Gérald Bovier	2007-2012	SVP/UDC	
Robert Galliker	2007-2012	None	
Fulvio Haefeli	2007-2012	SVP/UDC	
Madeleine Hirsig-Vouilloz	2007-2012	CVP/PDC	
Walter Lang	2007-2012	None	
Gérard Scherrer	2007-2012	None	
Daniel Schmid	2007-2012	SPS/PSS	
Hans Schürch	2007-2012	FDP/PRD	
Nina Spälti Giannakitsas	2007-2012	SPS/PSS	
Bendicht Tellenbach	2007-2012	SPS/PSS	
Vito Valenti	2007-2012	FDP/PRD	
Thomas Wespi	2007-2012	CVP/PDC	
Martin Zoller	2007-2012	CVP/PDC	

== Division V: Asylum Law ==
Name	Term of office	Party	Notes
Walter Stöckli	2007-2012	SPS/PSS	Division president
François Badoud	2007-2012	None	
Maurice Brodard	2007-2012	CVP/PDC	
Jenny de Coulon Scuntaro	2007-2012	FDP/PRD	
Jean-Daniel Dubey	2007-2012	None	
Kurt Gysi	2007-2012	FDP/PRD	
Bruno Huber	2007-2012	CVP/PDC	
Markus König	2007-2012	SPS/PSS	
Therese Kojic-Siegenthaler	2007-2012	None	
Christa Luterbacher	2007-2012	SPS/PSS	
Jean-Pierre Monnet	2007-2012	None	
Regula Schenker Senn	2007-2012	SPS/PSS	
Marianne Teuscher	2007-2012	SVP/UDC	
Beat Weber	2007-2012	FDP/PRD	
