= Sandro Calvesi =

Italian athletics coach

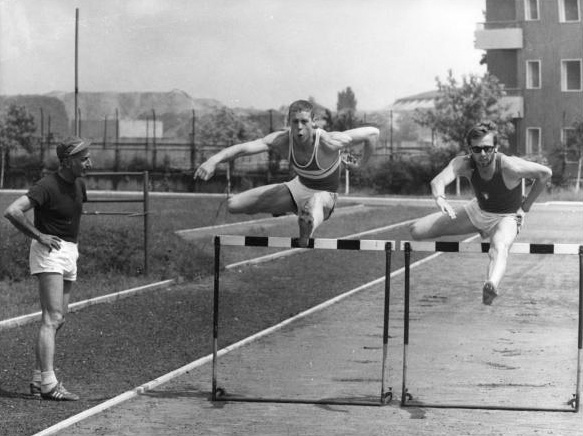
- Sandro Calvesi (left) with Guy Drut (center) and his son-in-law, Eddy Ottoz (Brescia, Italy 1969)

Personal information
- Nationality: Italian
- Born: 5 September 1913 Cigole, Italy
- Died: 20 November 1980 (aged 67) Brescia, Italy

Sport
- Country: Italy
- Sport: Athletics
- Event: Hurdling

Alessandro "Sandro" Calvesi (5 September 1913 – 20 November 1980) was an Italian athletics coach.

== Biography ==
Married to 1936 and 1948 Olympian Gabre Gabric, among the people he coached was the Italian hurdler Eddy Ottoz, after became his son-in-law, married to his daughter Lyana Calvesi. Ottoz set the Italian national record in the 110 metres hurdles while winning the bronze medal at the 1968 Olympics and was the dominant European hurdler of the 1960s. The record lasted for almost 26 years until it was bested by Calvesi's grandson, Laurent Ottoz, Eddy's son. Another grandson Patrick Ottoz also became a top ranked hurdler.

He was also the first coach of French Olympic champion Guy Drut, winner at 1976 Olympics.

He was also the founder of the athletic club, Atletica Brescia. As part of the team, among the other people Calvesi coached was Armando Filiput, two time European champion in the 400 metres hurdles, 1948 Olympian Luigi Paterlini and of course his wife, who continued to compete in Masters athletics into her 90s. Daughter Lyana, who he also coached, currently leads Atletica Sandro Calvesi, another top Italian athletic club, which hosts the annual Meeting Sandro Calvesi.

== See also ==
- Ottoz family
