= Calvesi =

Calvesi is a surname. Notable people with the surname include:

- Maurizio Calvesi (born 1954), Italian cinematographer
- Sandro Calvesi (1913–1980), Italian athletics coach
- Vincenzo Calvesi (fl. 1777–1811), Italian operatic tenor and impresario
