= Franklin Blyden =

U.S. Virgin Islands hurdler (born 1946)

Personal information
- Nationality: American Virgin Islander
- Born: 1946 (age 79–80)

Sport
- Sport: Track and field
- Event: 110 metres hurdles

Franklin Blyden (born 1946) is a hurdler who represents the United States Virgin Islands. He competed in the men's 110 metres hurdles at the 1968 Summer Olympics.

== Personal bests ==
- 110 metres hurdles – 14.74 (1968)
