= Rod Milburn =

American hurdler (1950–1997)

Rodney Milburn Jr.
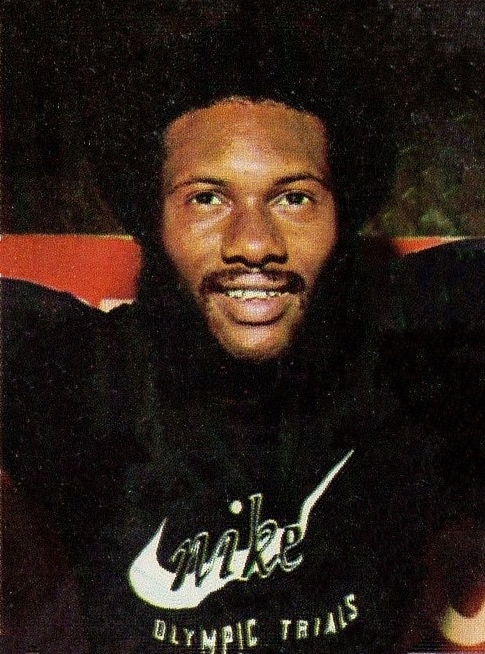
- Milburn c. 1972

Personal information
- Nationality: American
- Born: March 18, 1950 Opelousas, Louisiana, U.S.
- Died: November 11, 1997 (aged 47) Baton Rouge, Louisiana, U.S.
- Height: 6 ft 0 in (1.83 m)
- Weight: 175 lb (79 kg)

Sport
- Sport: Running
- Event: 110 m hurdles
- College team: Southern University

Achievements and titles
- Personal bests: 110 m hurdles: 13.24 s (Munich 1972 then WR); 120 y hurdles; 13.0 s Eugene, Oregon 1971 then WR)
Medal record
Representing the United States
Olympic Games
Gold medal – first place	1972 Munich	110 m hurdles
Pan American Games
Gold medal – first place	1971 Cali	110 m hurdles
Bronze medal – third place	1971 Cali	4 × 100 m relay

Rodney Milburn Jr. (May 18, 1950 – November 11, 1997) was an American hurdler who won gold at the 1972 Summer Olympics in Munich in the 110 m hurdles.

Milburn attended J. S. Clark High School in Opelousas, Louisiana.

== Career ==
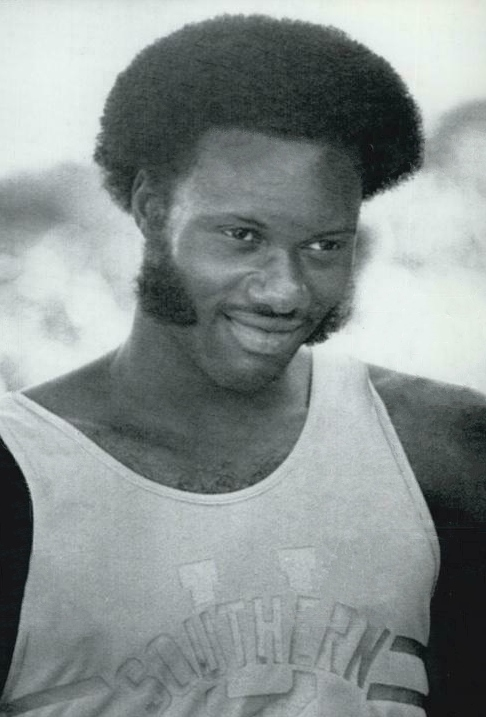
Milburn in 1971

During the early 1970s, Milburn dominated the 110 m hurdles, tying or breaking the world record for the 110 m hurdles/120 yards five times. (Note: 120 yards is 109.73m, a difference of 27 cm with 110 m. This means for record purposes there is no conversion factor applied for hand-timing when converting between times recorded for the two distances.) 1971, as a sophomore at Southern University, was when Milburn announced himself on the national and world stage. Amongst his achievements that year was his first world record. In a semi-final of the USA Championships he broke the record for 120 y with 13.0 s. (Note: The world record was first set 13.2 s for 110 m hurdles by Martin Lauer in 1959. As discussed above, this time is equivalent to running 13.2 s for the 120 y hurdles. The record of 13.2 s was equalled 5 times in the intervening years, including by Erv Hall for 120 y in 1969.) Milburn went on to win the title, in 13.1 s. Milburn was to remain undefeated in 1971, including winning the 110 m hurdles event at the 1971 Pan-American Games. He also showed his versatility by winning a bronze as a member of the United States sprint relay team at the Pan-American Games. With these performances, Milburn earned the nickname "Hot Rod", and was awarded the Track and Field News Athlete of the Year Award. His home state, Louisiana, also recognised him by awarding him the James J. Corbett Award as the outstanding male athlete from the state in 1971. He was to receive the same award a second time in 1973. He was the 1973 NCAA Indoor Champion for 60 yard hurdles.

The overwhelming favourite to qualify for the 1972 Munich Olympics. Milburn in fact struggled but did qualify in 3rd place at the USA Olympic Trials. In the final he hit hurdles due to the pressure of the world-record holder Willie Davenport running alongside him and only managed to hold the vital third and last qualifying place by a foot. In Munich Milburn won the gold medal in the 110 m hurdles, tying the world record of 13.2 seconds, finishing ahead of Guy Drut and Thomas Hill. This time, which was recorded as 13.24 to the hundredth of a second, would become the first world record when only automatically recorded times would be ratified as world records. (Note: From January 1, 1977, only automatic timings were accepted as world records by the IAAF. In addition, the IAAF scrapped world records for all imperial distances except for the mile.)

Milburn's triumph was overshadowed by other events. The qualifying rounds for the 110 m hurdles event was delayed by the suspension of the games following the terrorist attack in the Olympic Village. The final itself was then overlooked due to the furor over the behaviour of the American 400 meter runners Vince Matthews and Wayne Collett on the medal rostrum at their medal award ceremony.

In 1973 Milburn continued to demonstrate he was the world's pre-eminent high-hurdler by breaking the world record for the 110 m hurdles with a 13.1 s, knocking 0.1 s off a record that had lasted for 14 years, and equalling his own world record for 120 y hurdles of 13.0 s. The record-breaking times in the 110 m hurdles happened on July 6 in Zurich, Switzerland and on July 22 in Sienna, Italy; the record-equalling time in the 120 y hurdles happened on June 20 in Eugene, Oregon.

After this season, with no prospect of playing American football professionally and not able to endorse commercial products as an amateur athlete, Milburn joined the fledgling professional athletics tour run by the International Track Association (ITA). He was to remain unbeaten in their 1974 season. The ITA folded in 1976. By running as a professional, Milburn was ineligible to compete at the Olympics and defend his title.

In 1975, Milburn tried briefly to become an American football player with the fledgling World Football League team the Shreveport Steamer. His try out was unsuccessful.

Milburn returned as a hurdler in 1980 in time for an attempt at an Olympic comeback. He won the British AAA Championships title at the 1980 AAA Championships but the boycott of the Olympics denied him that possibility of going to the Olympics. He did, however, run as an amateur for two seasons with some success against the new generation of high hurdlers.

Sporting commentators note that Milburn was important in the history of hurdling for introducing two innovations: the double-armed lead (to reduce time in the air) and the dime on the hurdle practice technique (knocking off dimes placed on the top of each hurdle without touching the actual hurdle).

== Early life ==
Milburn turned to the hurdles under the tutelage of his high school coach Claude Paxton at J.S. Clark High School in Opelousas, Louisiana.

By his senior year, he was the outstanding high school hurdler in the United States and broke the national age record for the 120 y hurdles at 13.5 s. Acknowledgments of his achievements at high school included being voted on the Louisiana Sports Writers Association All-State track and field team in both his junior and senior years.

Following high school, he went to Southern University in Baton Rouge, Louisiana, with an athletics scholarship.

Here he met Willie Davenport, the 1968 110 m hurdles champion, who recognised his potential as a future Olympic champion and mentored the young athlete. He was coached at college by Dick Hill who had coached amongst others Bob Hayes the 1964 100 m Olympic champion.

== Later life ==
Milburn finally retired from athletics in 1983. Milburn was appointed the head track coach at Southern University in Baton Rouge, Louisiana in 1984 by his old college coach, Dick Hill. When Hill left Southern University in 1987, his replacement did not renew Milburn's contract.

Milburn struggled after this and took a job as a utility crewman at a paper and pulp mill of the Georgia-Pacific Corporation in Port Hudson, Louisiana: it was while working at this plant that Milburn died after falling into a tank containing a sodium chlorate solution.

His death came as a huge shock to a track and field community that vividly remembered his achievements on the track. At his funeral, a message of condolence from President Bill Clinton and his wife, Hilary, was read.

For Milburn, it was a great misfortune that his best years came at a time when it was impossible for even an Olympic champion to earn a good living from track: by running professionally, he had made himself ineligible to defend his Olympic title in 1976, and was then denied a chance to run in the 1980 Olympics by the 1980 Olympics boycott even when his eligibility for entry was reinstated. In the end, a court injunction allowing the former professional athletes to run at the Olympic Trials came too late for Milburn to compete.

Milburn was honoured as one of Louisiana's top 50 athletes of the 20th Century by Sports Illustrated. and in 1988 was inducted into the Louisiana Sports Hall of Fame.

== Rankings ==
Milburn was ranked among the best in the US and the world in the 110 m hurdles, in two periods separated by his time on the professional athletics circuit, according to the votes of the experts of Track and Field News.

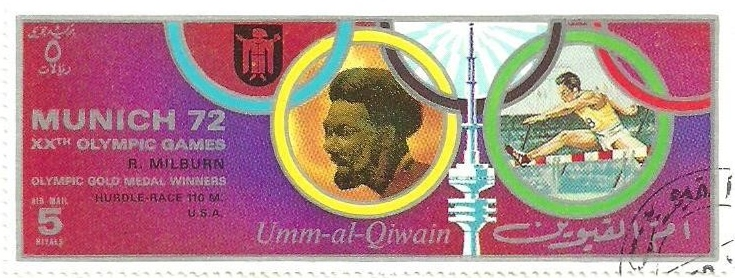
Milburn on a stamp of Umm al-Quwain

110 m hurdles
Year	World rank	US rank
1970	6th	4th
1971	1st	1st
1972	1st	1st
1973	1st	1st
1974	–	–
1975	–	–
1976	–	–
1977	–	–
1978	–	–
1979	–	–
1980	5th	4th
1981	8th	7th
1982	4th	3rd

== USA Championships ==
Milburn was a very successful competitor at 110 m hurdles in the USA National Track and Field Championships during two periods between 1970 and 1981 separated by his time on the professional athletics circuit.:

USA Championships
Year	110 m hurdles
1970	4th
1971	1st
1972	1st
1973	5th
1980	4th
1981	5th

In addition, Milburn was four times United States champion indoors at 60 m/60 y hurdles – in 1972–73 and 1980–81. He also set world records indoors for 50 y hurdles in 5.8 s, the 55 m hurdles in 6.8 s, and the 60 y hurdles in 6.7 s.

== Notes ==
Records
Preceded by (United States) Willie Davenport	Men's 110m Hurdles World Record Holder; September 2, 1972 — August 21, 1977	Succeeded by (Cuba) Alejandro Casañas
Awards and achievements
Preceded by (United States) Randy Matson	Track & Field Athlete of the Year; 1971	Succeeded by (Finland) Lasse Virén
Sporting positions
Preceded by (United States) Thomas Hill	Men's 110m Hurdles Best Year Performance; 1971–1973	Succeeded by (France) Guy Drut
