= Su Po-tai =

Taiwanese hurdler

Personal information
- Nationality: Taiwanese
- Born: 蘇 博泰, Pinyin: Sū Bó-tài; 2 June 1941 (age 85)

Sport
- Sport: Track and field
- Event: 110 metres hurdles

Su Po-tai (born 2 June 1941) is a Taiwanese hurdler. He competed in the men's 110 metres hurdles at the 1968 Summer Olympics.
