= Thomas Hill (hurdler) =

American hurdler

Tom Hill
Personal information
- Full name: Thomas Lionel Hill
- Born: New Orleans, Louisiana, U.S. November 17, 1949 (age 76)
Medal record
Men's Athletics
Representing United States
Olympic Games
Bronze medal – third place	1972 Munich	110 meter hurdles

Thomas Lionel Hill (born November 17, 1949, in New Orleans, Louisiana) is an American former athlete, who mainly competed in the 110 meter hurdles.

== Competitive career ==
Hill was among the world's best high hurdlers in the early 1970s and ranked as the number one in the event in the world in 1970. He was on the June 1970 cover of Track and Field News. He competed for the United States in the 1972 Summer Olympics held in Munich, Germany, where he won the bronze medal in the men's 110 meter hurdles event.

He ran track for Arkansas State University where his best finish at the NCAA Championships was a second place in 1972. He was the 1970 NCAA Indoor Champion for 60 yard hurdles.

After graduating, he completed his ROTC active duty obligation serving as assistant track coach at the United States Military Academy at West Point, while still competing in the hurdles.

Hill was inducted into the Arkansas Sports Hall of Fame in 1984.

== Rankings ==
Hill was ranked among the top ten runners in his event in the world and the extremely competitive US by Track and Field News on numerous occasions, and as the world's best high hurdler in 1970.

Year	World rank	US rank
1969	-	10th
1970	1st	1st
1972	3rd	2nd
1973	2nd	2nd
1976	6th	5th

== Post-competitive career ==
Following his retirement from the sport, Hill has pursued a career in athletic and academic administration. He earned his Ph.D. in Counselor Education from the University of Florida and served as assistant athletic director at both Tulane University and University of Oklahoma. He later served as dean of students at Florida before moving to Iowa State University where he served as vice president for Student Affairs.

Hill's son Thomas was an all-star basketball player at Duke University in the 1990s, including the 1991 and 1992 NCAA Championship teams.

Sporting positions
Preceded by (United States) Willie Davenport (United States) Leon Coleman	Men's 110m Hurdles Best Year Performance; 1970	Succeeded by (United States) Rodney Milburn
