= Paula Mollenhauer =

German discus thrower

Medal record

Women's athletics

Representing Germany

Olympic Games
Bronze medal – third place	1936 Berlin	Discus throw

European Championships
Bronze medal – third place	1938 Vienna	Discus throw

Paula Mollenhauer (December 22, 1908 – July 7, 1988) was a German athlete who won the bronze medal in the discus throw event at the 1936 Summer Olympics held in Berlin, Germany. She was born and died in Hamburg and she also won the bronze medal in the discus throw event at the 1938 European Athletics Championships in Vienna.
