= Liston Sprauve =

American weightlifter

Personal information
- Nationality: American Virgin Islander
- Born: May 17, 1944
- Died: August 29, 2018 (aged 74)

Sport
- Sport: Weightlifting

Liston Sprauve (May 17, 1944 – August 29, 2018) was a weightlifter who represents the United States Virgin Islands. He competed in the men's heavyweight event at the 1968 Summer Olympics.
