= Federal Administrative Court (Switzerland) =

Swiss federal court in St. Gallen

Coordinates: 47°25′20″N 9°21′32″E

Federal Administrative Court of Switzerland
- German: Bundesverwaltungsgericht; French: Tribunal administratif fédéral Italian: Tribunale amministrativo federale Romansh: Tribunal administrative federal
- Interactive map of Federal Administrative Court of Switzerland
- Jurisdiction: Switzerland
- Appeals to: Federal Supreme Court of Switzerland

The Federal Administrative Court of Switzerland (Note: German: Bundesverwaltungsgericht, French: Tribunal administratif fédéral, Italian: Tribunale amministrativo federale; Romansh: Tribunal administrative federal) is a Swiss federal court. It is the judicial authority to which decisions of the federal authorities of Switzerland can be appealed. The decisions of the Federal Administrative Court can generally be appealed, in turn, to the Federal Supreme Court of Switzerland.

== Purpose ==
The Federal Administrative Court was created with the federal judicial reform in 2005 to replace some thirty boards of appeal that exercised judicial oversight over the various departments of the federal administration. Up until 2007, the Swiss Federal Council, the supreme executive authority of Switzerland, also served as a final court of appeal in certain areas of administrative law. These judicial functions were also taken over by the Federal Administrative Court, ensuring that every decision of the administration can be reviewed in the last instance by an independent court of law.

== Organisation ==
The Federal Administrative Court is organised in six divisions with 73 judges in total:

- I: infrastructure, finance and personnel
- II: economy, education and competition
- III: foreigners, health and social security
- IV: asylum law
- V: asylum law
- VI: law concerning foreigners and citizenship

The judges are elected by the Federal Assembly of Switzerland and serve for six years; reelections are possible. Since 2022, the president of the Federal Administrative Court is Vito Valenti.

== Seat ==
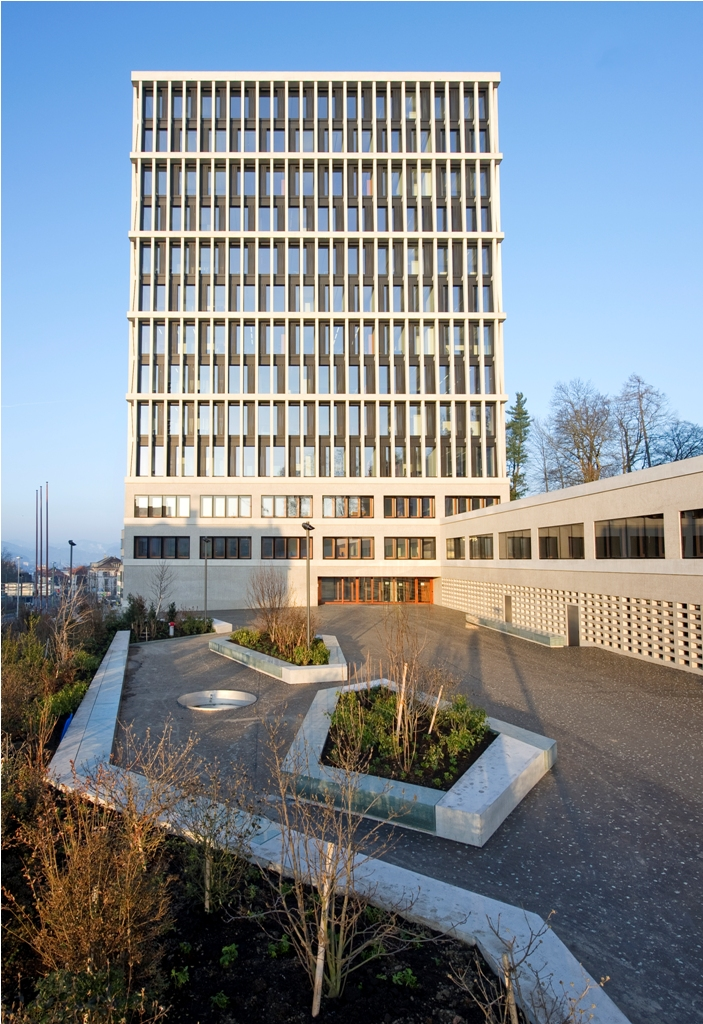
The Federal Administrative Court, St. Gallen

The Federal Administrative Court took up work in Bern on 1 January 2007. It was relocated to its permanent seat in St. Gallen in summer 2012 after the construction of the court building there was completed.

== Full-time positions since 2007 ==
Raw data

Source: "Federal Finance Administration FFA: Data portal".

== See also ==
- List of judges of the Federal Administrative Court of Switzerland
