= Marcel Duriez =

French hurdler (1940–2023)

Personal information
- Nationality: French
- Born: 20 June 1940 Seclin, France
- Died: 2 February 2023 (aged 82) Clermont-Ferrand, France

Sport
- Sport: Track and field
- Event: 110 metres hurdles
Medal record
Men's athletics
Representing France
European Championships
Bronze medal – third place	1966 Budapest	110 m hurdles

Marcel Duriez (20 June 1940 – 2 February 2023) was a French hurdler. He competed in the 110 metres hurdles at the 1960, 1964 and the 1968 Summer Olympics.

Duriez died in Clermont-Ferrand on 2 February 2023, at the age of 82.
