= Earl McCullouch =

American football player, sprinter, and hurdler (born 1946)

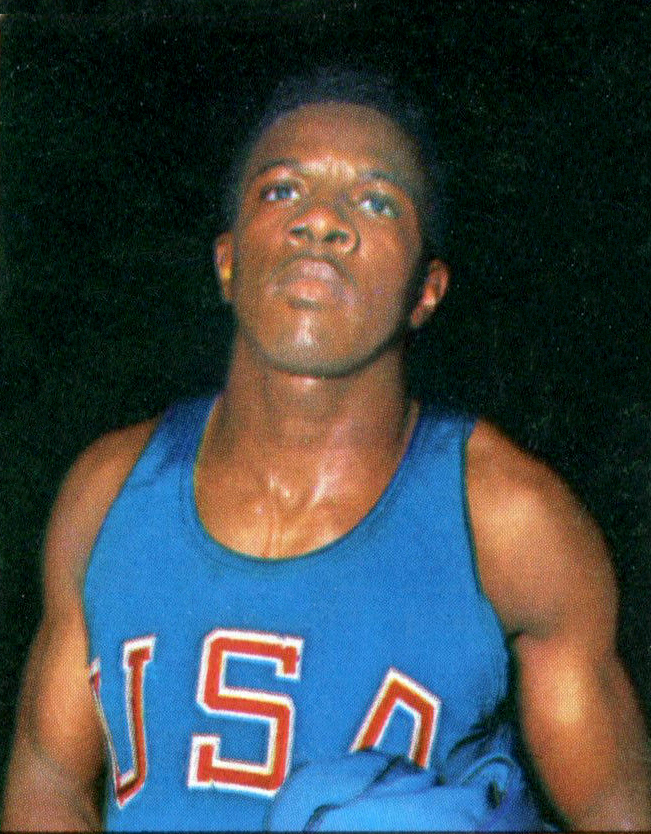
- McCullouch c. 1968

No. 25, 80
- Position: Wide receiver

Personal information
- Born: January 10, 1946 (age 80); Clarksville, Texas, U.S.
- Listed height: 5 ft 11 in (1.80 m)
- Listed weight: 175 lb (79 kg)

Career information
- High school: Long Beach Polytechnic (Long Beach, California)
- College: USC
- NFL draft: 1968: 1st round, 24th overall pick

Career history
- Detroit Lions (1968–1973); New Orleans Saints (1974)

Awards and highlights
- NFL Offensive Rookie of the Year (1968); National champion (1967); First-team All-Pac-8 (1967)

Career NFL statistics
- Receptions: 124
- Receiving yards: 2,319
- Receiving touchdowns: 19
- Stats at Pro Football Reference

Earl McCullouch
Medal record

Men's track and field

Representing the United States

Pan American Games
Gold medal – first place	1967 Winnipeg	110 m hurdles
Gold medal – first place	1967 Winnipeg	4×100 m relay

Earl R. McCullouch (born January 10, 1946) is an American former professional football player who was a wide receiver in the National Football League (NFL). He played college football for the USC Trojans and was selected by the Detroit Lions in the first round of the 1968 NFL draft.

McCullouch was the world record holder for the 110 meter men's high hurdle sprint from July 1967 to July 1969. When attending the University of Southern California, McCullouch was a member of the USC Track & Field teams (120 yard high hurdles and 4×110 sprint relay) in 1967 and 1968. The USC Track 4×110 yard relay team, for which McCullouch ran the start leg, set the world record in 1967 that remains today, as the metric 4 × 100 m relay is now the commonly contested event.

== Early life ==
McCullouch was born on January 10, 1946, in Clarksville, Texas. His family moved to Bakersfield, California, and then to Long Beach, where he attended Franklin Junior High School. McCullouch attended Long Beach Polytechnic High School (Poly). He tied the national high school record (held by Don Castronovo from Oceanside High School in Oceanside, New York, and Steve Caminiti from Crespi Carmelite High School in Encino, California) in the 180 yard low hurdles at 18.1 seconds. The record was never broken and the event was discontinued in regular high school competition in 1974.

He swept both the 120 yard high hurdles and the 180 low hurdles at the CIF California State Meet in 1964 (defeating Caminiti). He also tied the U.S. high school record for the 120-yard high hurdles, and had 49 consecutive victories in that season's high and low hurdles.

He played running back and safety for Poly's football team. McCullouch and teammate Marv Motley, known as "M incorporated", combined for 23 touchdowns in their senior year. McCullouch caught 10 passes for 273 yards, six of which were for touchdowns.

In 1964, McCullouch was named Co-Athlete of the Year in the California Interscholastic Federation (CIF) Southern Section by the Helms Athletic Foundation. He earned the award in conjunction with pole vaulter Paul Wilson. He played in the Shrine football game the summer after his graduation, rushing for 55 yards and scoring two touchdowns.

== College career ==
Next he attended community college and played football at Long Beach City College, playing safety, running back and flanker. McCullouch helped lead the undefeated (11–0) 1964 Long Beach Vikings football team to the Junior College National Championship, and a victory in the Junior Rose Bowl. He later transferred to the University of Southern California (USC), where he played college football under coach John McKay, who switched McCullouch to wide receiver.

McCullouch was part of USC's 1967 National Championship team. He had 28 receptions for 517 yards (18.5 yards per reception), and five touchdowns; along with four rushing attempts for 76 yards. He was one of five USC Trojans players taken in the first round of the 1968 NFL/AFL draft after his senior year ( along with Ron Yary/1st, Mike Taylor/10th, Tim Rossovich/14th, Mike Hull/16th). On January 1, 1968, the Trojans defeated Indiana University in the 1968 Rose Bowl, 14–3.

McCullouch was known for having elite sprinter speed and used it on both the track and the football field. Wearing No. 22 during the 1966 and 1967 seasons, McCulloch played wide receiver on an offensive USC Trojan Football squad that featured tailback O. J. Simpson. Defensive coverages had difficulty covering McCullouch in pass routes and chasing him after pass completions due to his sprinter's speed. McCullouch also provided down-field blocking on break-away plays, often for 1968 Heisman Trophy winner Simpson.

As a member of the USC Track & Field team, McCulloch was the NCAA 120 Yard High Hurdle champion in 1967 and 1968, the NCAA 60 yard indoor high hurdle champion in 1968, and was the lead leg sprinter of the USC NCAA 4×110 yard sprint relay team in 1967 and 1968 (the team also featured Simpson and future Olympian sprinter Lennox Miller). In the 1967 high hurdles, he defeated the favored Richmond Flowers, another future NFL player. The USC Trojan sprint relay team (McCulloch, Fred Kuller, Simpson, and Lennox Miller – in order) set a 4×110 yard sprint relay world record (38.6 sec.) in the 1967 NCAA Track & Field Championships in Provo, Utah on June 17, 1967. In the era of metric-distance sprint world records, this world record still stands today and is likely not to be broken.

McCullough was on the cover of the April 1968 issue of Track and Field News.

He played in the 1968 College All Star Game against the Green Bay Packers, catching two touchdown passes from future Lions teammate Greg Landry. The Packers’ future Hall of Fame defensive back Herb Adderly thought McCullouch was the fastest receiver for 20 yards.

His nickname at USC was "the Pearl".

== Professional career ==
McCullouch was selected by the Detroit Lions as their second pick of the first round (24th overall), having drafted Landry with the 11th pick, on January 30, 1968.

As the world record holder and National Champion in the hurdles, McCullouch was a favorite for the Olympic gold medal. In 1968, the Olympic Trials held a Semi-Final event a week after the National Championships at the end of June. There, McCullouch hit several hurdles and finished poorly in 7th place. The final Olympic Trials and Olympics were scheduled for later in the year, September 13 and mid-to-late October respectively, well into the football season which started on September 15. McCullouch himself recalled tripping on the seventh hurdle. He still could have competed for the Olympics in the relays, and there was some thought he still might be placed on the team for the hurdles, but he did not believe the latter to be fair. He decided not to go to the Olympics, and rather to join the Lions, and did not later regret his decision. In August 1968, he played in the College All Star Game on his way to the NFL, rather than pursuing the Olympics.

And while the Olympics meant glory, there was no money to be made in the amateur days of the Olympics. McCullouch had a tough choice between his two sports. Willie Davenport went on to win both the trials and the Olympics. A year later, Davenport finally beat McCullouch's world record.

By the time the Olympic races rolled around, Detroit had already played 5 official games of the regular season and was about to take the lead in the Central Division. By that time, McCullouch had already amassed 419 yards receiving and scored three touchdowns, including an 80-yard reception, from the Lions' other first round pick Greg Landry, in their first NFL game. In only the sixth game of his rookie season, he scored two touchdowns against the defending champion Packers in the first quarter. He finished the season with 680 yards receiving on 40 receptions, plus another 13 in 3 rushing attempts, 5 touchdowns and a 16.1-yard per touch average (in 43 touches) and was named the NFL Rookie of the Year in 1968.

During his first three years with the Lions, he had surgery on each foot and a surgery to remove bone chips from a knee, and he never regained his full speed. His 40 catches and 680 yards as a rookie would be career highs. He played five more years with the Lions (1969–73), with reduced reception numbers (33, 15, 21, 5, 9) and yardage (529, 278, 552, 96, 179). McCullouch finished off his career with a non-productive season with the New Orleans Saints in 1974, playing in only three games with one reception. After that, he was a player-assistant with the Portland Thunder of the World Football League for a short time.

== Personal life ==
McCullouch met his wife Peggy (Harris) McCullouch in high school, and they were married in 1965. They have five children. He was the personnel director of the short-lived International Track Association in the mid 1970s. He was an assistant track coach for six years at Long Beach Community College. He worked at McDonnell-Douglas and FedEx, from where he retired.

Records
Preceded by (Germany) Martin Lauer	Men's 110m Hurdles World Record Holder; July 16, 1967 — July 4, 1969	Succeeded by (United States) Willie Davenport
Sporting positions
Preceded by (United States) Willie Davenport	Men's 110m Hurdles Best Year Performance; 1967	Succeeded by (United States) Willie Davenport
