= Håkon Fimland =

Norwegian hurdler and politician

Håkon Fimland (8 March 1942 – 24 July 2016) was a Norwegian hurdler and politician.

He was born in Naustdal Municipality. As an active hurdler he participated at the 1969 and 1971 European Championships, reaching no further than the semifinal on both occasions. He became Norwegian champion six times in a row, in the years 1971–1976. During his career he represented the clubs IL Tambarskjelvar and IL Gular. His career best time was 14.26 seconds, achieved in September 1971 in Munich. With hand timing he clocked in 13.9 seconds.

As a politician Fimland represented the Centre Party. He was a member of the municipal council for Bergen Municipality and later the municipal council for Førde Municipality. He was also a member of the Arts Council Norway for eight years, and was the deputy chairperson of the Norwegian Athletics Association from 1987 to 1991. He was awarded the HM The King's Medal of Merit in 2009. He died in 2016.
