= Patrick Ottoz =

Italian hurdler

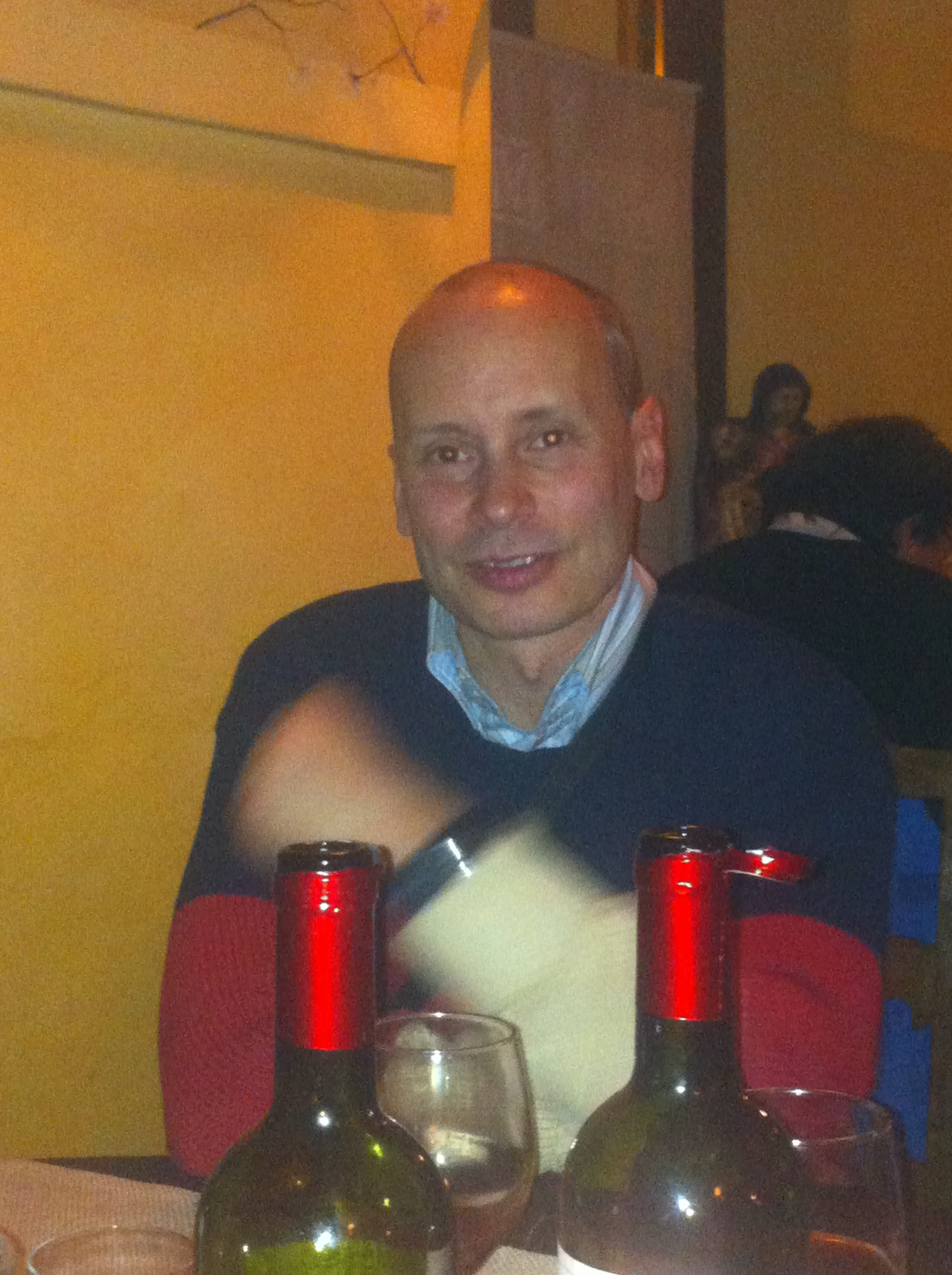
- Patrick Ottoz in 2014 at age 43

Personal information
- Nationality: Italian
- Born: 15 June 1971 (age 55) Brescia, Italy
- Height: 1.82 m (5 ft 11 1/2 in)
- Weight: 74 kg (163 lb)

Sport
- Country: Italy
- Sport: Athletics
- Event: 400 metres hurdles
- Club: Atletica Sandro Calvesi

Achievements and titles
- Personal best: 400 m hs: 49.24 (1996)

Patrick Ottoz (born 15 June 1971) is an Italian former athlete who competed in the 400 metres hurdles.

== Biography ==
His personal, set in Bologna on 26 May 1996, is the seventh Italian all-time best performance. He is the son of the Italian Olympic legend Eddy Ottoz (bronze medal at the 1968 Summer Olympics).

== Achievements ==
Year	Competition	Venue	Position	Event	Performance	Notes
1995	World Championships	(Sweden) Gothenburg	Heat	400 metres hurdles	49.65	
1995	Universiade	(Japan) Fukuoka	Semifinal	400 metres hurdles	50.13	
1999	Universiade	(Spain) Palma de Mallorca	Semifinal	400 metres hurdles	50.65	

== Progression ==
400 m hs

Year	Performance	Venue	Date	World Ranking
2002	53.89	(Switzerland) Genève	15/06/2002	
1999	50.14	(Italy) La Spezia	12/06/1999	
1997	50.40	(Italy) Rome	28/05/1997	
1996	49.24	(Italy) Bologna	26/05/1996	
1995	49.44	(Italy) Cesenatico	02/07/1995	

== See also ==
- Italian all-time lists - 400 metres hurdles
- Ottoz family
