= Oleg Stepanenko =

Ukrainian hurdler

Personal information
- Nationality: Ukrainian
- Born: 20 October 1939 (age 86)

Sport
- Sport: Track and field
- Event: 110 metres hurdles

Oleg Stepanenko (born 20 October 1939) is a Ukrainian hurdler. He competed in the men's 110 metres hurdles at the 1968 Summer Olympics representing the Soviet Union.
