= 1938 European Athletics Championships – Women's discus throw =

Women's discus throw at the European Athletics Championships

The women's discus throw at the 1938 European Athletics Championships was held in Vienna, at the time part of German Reich, at Praterstadion on 18 September 1938.

== Medalists ==
Gold	Gisela Mauermayer; Germany
Silver	Hildegard Sommer; Germany
Bronze	Paula Mollenhauer; Germany

== Results ==
=== Final ===
18 September

Rank	Name	Nationality	Result	Notes
1st place, gold medalist(s)	Gisela Mauermayer	Germany	44.80	CR
2nd place, silver medalist(s)	Hildegard Sommer	Germany	40.95	
3rd place, bronze medalist(s)	Paula Mollenhauer	Germany	39.81	
4	Birgit Lundström	Sweden	38.12	
5	Genowefa Cejzik	Poland	36.51	
6	Gabre Gabric-Calvesi	Italy	35.53	
7	Ans Niesink	Netherlands	35.48	
8	Bevis Reid	Great Britain	34.19	
9	Britta Awall	Sweden	33.26	
10	Kathleen Dyer-Tilley	Great Britain	33.18	
11	Ágnes Nadányi	Hungary	31.08	

== Participation ==
According to an unofficial count, 11 athletes from 7 countries participated in the event.

- Germany (3)
- Hungary (1)
- Italy (1)
- Netherlands (1)
- Poland (1)
- Sweden (2)
- Great Britain (2)
