= Muhammad Ahmed Bashir =

Pakistani hurdler (born 1949)

Personal information
- Nationality: Pakistani
- Born: 1 December 1949 (age 76)

Sport
- Sport: Track and field
- Event: 110 metres hurdles

Muhammad Ahmed Bashir (born 1 December 1949) is a Pakistani hurdler. He competed in the men's 110 metres hurdles at the 1972 Summer Olympics.
