= Ervin Hall =

American sprinter (born 1947)

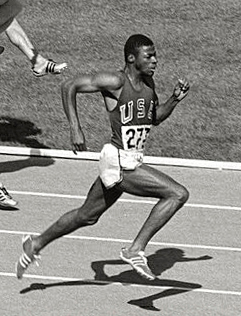
- Ervin Hall at the 1968 Olympics

Personal information
- Born: July 2, 1947 (age 79) Philadelphia, Pennsylvania, United States
- Height: 1.83 m (6 ft 0 in)
- Weight: 75 kg (165 lb)

Sport
- Sport: Sprint running
- Club: Philadelphia Pioneer Club

Achievements and titles
- Personal bests: 100 yd – 9.4 (1967); 100 m – 10.2 (1968); 220 yd – 20.8 (1968); 110 mh – 13.38 (1968)
Medal record
Representing the United States
Summer Olympics
Silver medal – second place	1968 Mexico City	110 metre hurdles

Ervin Henry "Erv" Hall (born July 2, 1947) is a retired American sprinter who won a silver medal in the 110 m hurdles at the 1968 Summer Olympics in Mexico City. In the semifinal he set an Olympic record at 13.3 seconds. He was 0.1 s slower in the final, and lost to Willie Davenport, who ran 13.3.

Hall ran collegially for Villanova. He was the 1969 NCAA Indoor Champion for 60 yard hurdles. After graduating from Philadelphia's Overbrook High School (famous graduates include Wilt Chamberlain), Erv Hall matured into a world-class high hurdler in the late 1960s at a time when the USA totally dominated the event. The USA national championships and Olympic Trials both produced higher quality fields than an Olympic final. The top three hurdlers in the world during 1967 and the early part of 1968 were Willie Davenport, Earl McCullouch, and Richmond Flowers, all from the USA. However, a mid-season injury sustained by Flowers and a decision by McColloch to play professional football significantly promoted Villanova junior Erv Hall's chances to make that year's Olympic team to the Mexico City games. Hall, who ran locally at Overbrook high school before competing for Villanova, seized this opportunity at the USA final Olympic Trials at South Lake Tahoe on September 13, 1968, when he finished third behind Davenport and Leon Coleman to make the Olympic team. At Mexico City, on October 17, Hall further showed that he was a force to be reckoned with when he set a new Olympic Record of 13.3 seconds to win the first Olympic semi-final of the 110 meter hurdles. This performance was also timed electronically as 13.38 seconds, the fastest time ever recorded up to that date, but at a stage when World Records were not recognized for electronic times. In the Olympic final held only two hours later, Willie Davenport led the race from the gun to win easily, while Hall claimed the silver medal. Hall, representing Villanova, continued this form into the following year when he won the NCAA indoor title over 60 yards in a time of 7.0 seconds. He outdid his performance at the NCAA indoor championships when he set a new World and American Record at the NCAA Outdoor Championships in Knoxville, TN. There, he ran 13.2 to win the 120 yard hurdle title. Hall retired from competition at the end of the outdoor season in 1969.

Records
Preceded by (United States) Earl McCullouch	Men's 110m Hurdles World Record Holder; October 17, 1968	Succeeded by (United States) Willie Davenport
