= David Wilson (hurdler) =

British hurdler

Personal information
- Nationality: British (Scottish)
- Born: 7 September 1951 (age 74) Edinburgh, Scotland
- Height: 192 cm (6 ft 4 in)
- Weight: 81 kg (179 lb)

Sport
- Sport: Athletics
- Event: 110 metres hurdles
- Club: Edinburgh AC

David Wilson (born 7 September 1951) is a British hurdler who competed at the 1972 Summer Olympics.

== Biography ==
At the 1972 Olympics Games in Munich, Wilson represented Great Britain in the men's 110 metres hurdles event.

Wilson finished third behind Berwyn Price in the 110 metres hurdles event at the 1976 AAA Championships and would also finish third at the 1979 AAA Championships.
