= Bo Forssander =

Swedish athlete

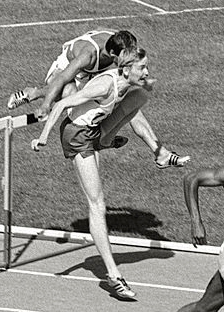
- Bo Forssander at the 1968 Olympics

Personal information
- Nickname: Skackan
- Born: 2 August 1942 (age 83) Hässleholm, Sweden
- Height: 1.86 m (6 ft 1 in)
- Weight: 67 kg (148 lb)

Sport
- Sport: Athletics
- Events: Hurdles, sprint
- Club: Skackans IF, Karlsborg; Malmö AI; Gävle Godtemplares IK

Achievements and titles
- Personal bests: 110 mH – 13.73 (1968); 100 m – 10.7
Medal record
Representing Sweden
European Cup
| Silver medal – second place | 1970 Stockholm | 110 m hurdles |

Bo Erik Örjan Forssander is a retired Swedish sprinter. He competed at the 1964, 1968 and 1972 Olympics in the 110 m hurdles with the best achievement of sixth place in 1968. He won a silver medal in this event at the 1970 European Cup and finished eighth at the 1966 European Championships. Forssander was the Swedish champion over 100 m (1967) and 110 m hurdles (1960, 1961, 1963–64 and 1967–72), and held the national record in the 110 m hurdles from 1964 to 1992.

Forssander finished third behind Berwyn Price in the 110 metres hurdles event at the British 1973 AAA Championships.
