= Alfred Proksch =

Austrian thrower and graphic designer

- Born: December 11, 1908; Vienna, Austria
- Died: January 3, 2011 (aged 102); Vienna, Austria
- Occupation: Athlete

Alfred Proksch
Medal record

Men's athletics

Representing Austria

Worlds Masters Championships
Gold medal – first place	1994 Athens	Discus, M85 Class
Gold medal – first place	2005 San Sebastián	Discus, M95 Class
Gold medal – first place	2005 San Sebastián	Shot Put, M95 Class
Gold medal – first place	2005 San Sebastián	Javelin, M95 Class
Gold medal – first place	2006 Poznań	Discus, M95 Class
Gold medal – first place	2006 Poznań	Shot Put, M95 Class
Gold medal – first place	2006 Poznań	Javelin, M95 Class
Gold medal – first place	2007 Helsinki	Discus, M95 Class
Gold medal – first place	2007 Helsinki	Shot Put, M95 Class
Gold medal – first place	2007 Riccione	Discus, M95 Class
Gold medal – first place	2008 Clermont-Ferrand	Discus, M95 Class
Gold medal – first place	2008 Clermont-Ferrand	Shot Put, M95 Class
Gold medal – first place	2009 Lahti	Discus, M100 Class
Gold medal – first place	2009 Lahti	Shot Put, M100 Class
Silver medal – second place	1995 Buffalo	Discus, M95 Class

Alfred Proksch (December 11, 1908 – January 3, 2011) was an Austrian Olympic athlete and graphic designer. The son of one of the co-founders of the Wiener Sport-Club, Proksch took an active interest in both athletics and graphic design from an early age. By the age of 19 he had started his own design company and would later become a founder, then president, of the Confederation of Austrian Graphic Designers. He was also a key figure in the founding of Icograda.

By the age of 17, Proksch was a champion pole vaulter and competed internationally, most notably placing 6th in the event at the 1936 Summer Olympics. He broke the Austrian record for the event on eight occasions. Even after turning 100, he continued to compete at the World's Masters Championships, often unopposed in his age bracket. Having won 14 gold medals at the games after 1994, he was considered the world's oldest active athlete. He was one of the last two known surviving track and field competitors from the 1936 Olympic Games to still be competing (the other being Ljubica Gabric-Calvesi).

== Early life ==
Proksch was born on December 11, 1908, in Vienna to Ignaz Proksch and Henriette Gaugusch. His father was a secretary to the House of Schwarzenberg and, although his family was initially poor, they became better off financially after World War I. He attended boarding school with his four brothers and, by the age of 15, was already earning money as an illustrator under the pseudonym Fedor Broskow. He worked at various jobs designing posters until 1926, when he entered the University of Applied Arts Vienna. He later took courses at the Academy of Fine Arts Vienna.

== Professional career and Olympics ==
In 1927, at the age of 19, Proksch started his own design company and was one of the original 10 founders of the Confederation of Austrian Graphic Designers (now Design Austria). He was for a time in the 1960s President of the Confederation of Austrian Graphic Designers. He encountered hardships, however, with the onset of the Great Depression and experienced difficulties in finding work. In 1933 he married Ida Moser, a fashion designer and model, and had four children with her.

Proksch's father was one of the co-founders of the Wiener Sport-Club and encouraged his son to participate in athletic activities. At the age of 17 he was the Vienna Youth Champion and over the course of his career he set the Austrian record in the pole vault eight times. At the 1936 Summer Olympics in Berlin he placed 6th in the Men's Pole Vault competition with a height of 4.00m. He set his personal best at this event on August 2, 1937, in London with a height of 4.115.

== Later life and World's Masters Championships ==
Proksch served during World War II in Russia, France and Albania. At the end of the war he hid in Waldviertel and Spitz, working low-key jobs as a graphic designer, before settling in Eichgraben in 1947. In 1963 he was present at the meeting that helped found what has become the world body for professional communication design and visual communication, Icograda. Awarded the title of "Professor" in 1967, he retired from graphic design at the age of 70. His son Peter Proksch is also a painter and graphic designer.

From 1955 to 2005 he was President of the Vienna Cricket and Football-Club. Through 2009, Proksch continued to compete in athletics tournaments and lived on his own, his wife having died in the 1980s. Between 1994 and 2009 he won 14 gold medals, as well as one silver, in the World's Masters Championships, in the discus, shot put and javelin throw events. In 2009 he had cardiac surgery after a heart attack, as well as knee surgery, but nevertheless continued to participate in shot put events, winning gold medals in discus and shot put (with a distance of 2.8m) at the 2009 World's Masters Championships in Lahti as the only competitor in the 100+ age bracket. He was the Austrian Athletics Association's oldest athlete and was considered the world's oldest active athlete.

Proksch was also a painter, and his works were displayed from December 9 to 23, 2008, and from January 13 to 31, 2009, in a gallery in Vienna in honour of his 100th birthday. He was made honorary president for life of Design Austria. He died on January 3, 2011, at the age of 102.

== See also ==
- List of centenarian masters track and field athletes
