= Florence Aubry Girardin =

Florence Aubry Girardin (born May 10, 1964 ; citizen of Le Noirmont and Le Bémont ) is a Swiss judge. She has been a judge on the Federal Supreme Court since 2007. At the time of her appointment, she was the second Green Party representative serving on the court.
