= Vyacheslav Skomorokhov =

Medal record

Men's athletics

Representing Soviet Union

European Championships
Gold medal – first place	1969 Athens	400 m hurdles

Vyacheslav Semyonovic Skomorokhov (4 October 1940 – 5 November 1992) was a Ukrainian track and field athlete who competed in the 1968 Summer Olympics. He was almost deaf since early childhood and also competed in the Deaf World Games in 1961,1969, 1973 and 1977. He also has won medals at the Deaflympics.

== See also ==
Deaf people in the Olympics
