= Daniel Riedo =

Swiss sprinter

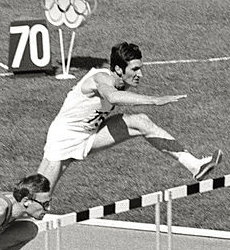
- Daniel Riedo at the 1968 Olympics

Personal information
- Born: 22 February 1942 (age 84) Oberschrot, Fribourg, Switzerland
- Height: 1.94 m (6 ft 4 in)
- Weight: 94 kg (207 lb)

Sport
- Sport: Hurdles
- Club: TV-AS Pratteln

Achievements and titles
- Personal best(s): 13.8 (110 m, 1968)

Daniel Riedo (born 22 February 1942) is a retired Swiss sprinter. He competed at the 1968 Summer Olympics in the 110m hurdles but was eliminated in a semifinal.
