= Willie Davenport =

American athlete and bobsledder (1943–2002)

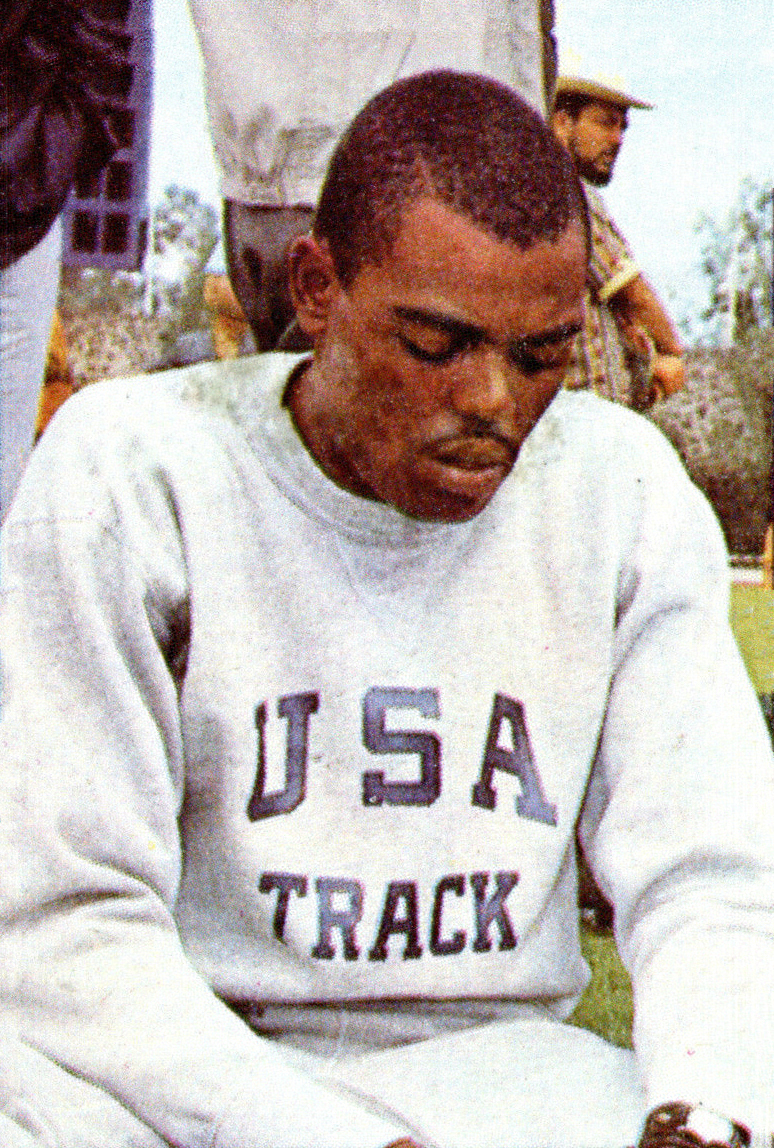
- Davenport at the 1968 Olympics

Personal information
- Full name: William D. Davenport
- Born: June 8, 1943 Troy, Alabama, U.S.
- Died: June 17, 2002 (aged 59) Chicago, Illinois, U.S.
- Education: Southern University
- Height: 6 ft 1 in (185 cm)
- Weight: 185 lb (84 kg)

Sport
- Sport: Sprint running
- Club: Baton Rouge Track Club

Achievements and titles
- Personal bests: 100 yd – 9.5 (1968); 100 m – 10.3 (1969); 110 mh – 13.33 (1968)
Medal record
Representing the United States
Olympic Games
Gold medal – first place	1968 Mexico City	110 m hurdles
Bronze medal – third place	1976 Montréal	110 m hurdles
Pan American Games
Silver medal – second place	1967 Winnipeg	110 m hurdles
Summer Universiade
Bronze medal – third place	1965 Budapest	110 m hurdles

William D. Davenport (June 8, 1943 – June 17, 2002) was an American sprint runner.

== Biography ==
He attended Howland High School near Warren, Ohio, and college at Southern University and A&M College in Baton Rouge, Louisiana.

Davenport took part in his first Olympics in 1964, but injured his thigh and was eliminated in the semifinals. He competed in the 110 m hurdles at the 1964, 1968, 1972 and 1976 Summer Olympics, winning a gold medal in 1968 and a bronze in 1976, and finishing fourth in 1972. In 1980 he took part in the Winter Olympics as a runner for the American bobsleigh team. Because of the boycott, and the quirk of participating in the Winter Olympics, he was the only U.S. track and field athlete to participate in the 1980 Olympics. In Mexico City in 1968, he reached the final and won, later saying, "From the first step, the gun, I knew I had won the race." In 1972 he finished fourth, and in his third consecutive Olympic 110 m hurdles final, in 1976, he won a bronze medal.

Davenport was a member of the Southern Jaguars football team in college, and immediately departed the 1968 Olympics after winning the gold to join the team for the final games. He was drafted by the New Orleans Saints as a wide receiver in the sixth round (138th overall) of the 1969 NFL/AFL draft, but a misunderstanding about his college eligibility prompted the Saints to withdraw the selection. When it turned out he was allowed to play, the San Diego Chargers picked him in the 16th round (408th overall) but he and the team could not agree to a contract. The Saints drafted him again in 1970 in the 12th round (296th overall) as a defensive back, though he did not join them either.

At his last Olympics in 1980, Davenport was a bobsleigh runner, ending up 12th in the four-man competition. Davenport's other achievements include five national championships in the 60 yard hurdles indoor event. By participating in the 1980 bobsleigh competition, he became one of the first two African Americans to compete in the bobsled in the Winter Olympics. The other, on the same sled with Davenport, was Jeff Gadley.

In 1985, Davenport competed at the Masters Outdoor World Championship in Rome.

Davenport died of a heart attack at age 59 at Chicago's O'Hare International Airport on June 17, 2002. He was a U.S. Army private at the time of his first Olympic participation and a colonel in the United States Army National Guard at the time of his death.

== Legacy ==
In 1977 he was inducted into the Mt. SAC Relays Hall of Fame, and in 1982 into the National Track and Field Hall of Fame.

Records
Preceded by (United States) Earl McCullouch	Men's 110m Hurdles World Record Holder; July 4, 1969 – September 2, 1972	Succeeded by (United States) Rodney Milburn
Sporting positions
Unknown	Men's 110m Hurdles Best Year Performance; 1966	Succeeded by (United States) Earl McCullouch
Preceded by (United States) Earl McCullouch	Men's 110m Hurdles Best Year Performance; 1968–1969	Succeeded by (United States) Thomas Hill
