= Mike Parker (hurdler) =

British hurdler (born 1938)

Personal information
- Nationality: British (English)
- Born: 2 May 1938 (age 88) Bridgnorth, Shropshire, England
- Height: 187 cm (6 ft 2 in)
- Weight: 80 kg (176 lb)

Sport
- Sport: Athletics
- Event: Hurdling
- Club: Cambridge University AC; Achilles Club

Achievements and titles
- Personal best: 110H – 13.9 (1963)
Medal record
Athletics
Representing England
British Empire & Commonwealth Games
| Silver medal – second place | 1966 Kingston | 120y hurdles |

John Michael Parker (born 2 May 1938) is a British former hurdler who competed at the two Olympic Games.

== Biography ==
Parker was educated at Repton School and St Catharine's College, Cambridge.

Parker finished second behind Ghulam Raziq in the 120 yards hurdles event at the 1960 AAA Championships and by virtue of being the best placed British athlete was the British 120 yards hurdles champion.

Parker won the 120 yards hurdles title outright at the 1964 AAA Championships and later that year at the 1964 Olympic Games in Tokyo, he represented Great Britain in the 110 metres hurdles.

Parker represented England and won a silver medal in the 120 yards hurdles, at the 1966 British Empire and Commonwealth Games in Kingston, Jamaica.

At the 1968 Olympic Games in Mexico City, Parker represented Great Britain again in the 110 metres hurdles.
