= Kjellfred Weum =

Norwegian hurdler (1940–2017)

Kjellfred Weum (30 July 1940, in Hafslo – 7 August 2017) was a Norwegian hurdler.

He finished seventh at the 1969 European Championships. He also participated at the 1968 Summer Olympics as well as the European Indoor Games in 1966, 1967 and 1968 without reaching the final. He became Norwegian champion eight times in a row, in the years 1963-1970. He represented the clubs IF Hellas and IL i BUL.

His career best time was 14.04 seconds, achieved at the 1968 Olympics in Mexico City. This places him eighth on the Norwegian all-time list. With manual hand timing he clocked 13.7 seconds.

Outside of athletics, Weum worked as a police officer in several places including Oslo Municipality, Bærum Municipality, his native Luster Municipality, Leikanger Municipality, and Sogndal Municipality.
