= Hinrich John =

German hurdler

Personal information
- Nationality: German
- Born: 11 May 1936 (age 90) Kiel, Schleswig-Holstein, Germany
- Height: 183 cm (6 ft 0 in)
- Weight: 73 kg (161 lb)

Sport
- Country: Germany
- Sport: Hurdling

Achievements and titles
- Personal best: 110H – 13.87 (1968)
Medal record
Men's athletics
Representing West Germany
European Championships
Silver medal – second place	1966 Budapest	110 m hurdles

Hinrich John (born 11 May 1936) is a German Olympic hurdler. He represented his country in the 1964 and 1968 Summer Olympics.

Eliminated in the 110 m semifinals at the 1964 and 1968 Olympics, John finished as runner-up at the 1966 European Championships and fourth at the 1965 European Cup. He won two golds in the years 1960 and 1965, three silvers in the years 1960, 1966 and 1968, and two bronzes in the years 1961 and 1962, at the Military World Championships. From 1964 to 1968, he won five consecutive titles in West Germany, along with winning the 1965 indoor 200 metres and the 1966 indoor 50 metre titles.

Awarded the Rudolf-Harbig-Gedächtnispreisträger in 1968, John also received the Silver Bay Leaf in 1967. His sons Hendrik and Helge became track and field athletes while he was a professional soldier in the German Bundeswehr and was promoted to lieutenant before becoming commander of the Navy Signal School at Flensburg.
