= Viktor Balikhin (athlete) =

Soviet hurdler

Personal information
- Nationality: Soviet
- Born: 5 October 1938 (age 87) Onguday, Soviet Union
- Height: 1.85 m (6 ft 1 in)
- Weight: 82 kg (181 lb)

Sport
- Sport: Track and field
- Event: 110 metres hurdles
- Club: SK VS Brest
- Coached by: Yuriy Lituyev

Viktor Yefimovich Balikhin (Виктор Ефимович Балихин; born 5 October 1938) is a Soviet hurdler. He competed in the men's 110 metres hurdles at the 1968 Summer Olympics.

His personal best in the event is 13.82 seconds set in 1968.
