= Pierre Schoebel =

French hurdler

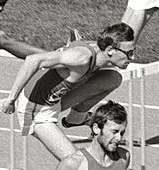
- Schoebel at 1968 Summer Olympics

Personal information
- Nationality: French
- Born: 26 June 1942 (age 84) Paris, France

Sport
- Sport: Track and field
- Events: 110 metres hurdles High jump
Medal record
Representing France
Summer Universiade
Bronze medal – third place	1967 Tokyo	110m hurdles

Pierre Schoebel (born 26 June 1942) is a French former hurdler. He competed in the men's 110 metres hurdles at the 1968 Summer Olympics.
