= Eddy Ottoz =

Italian hurdler

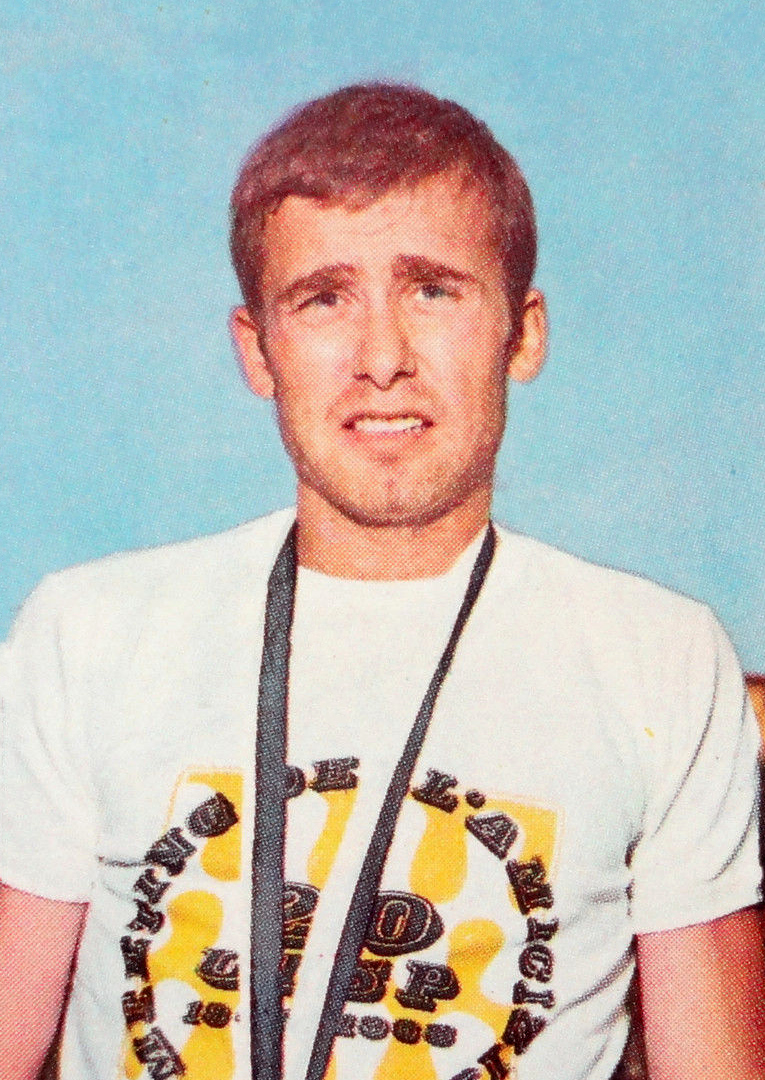
- Eddy Ottoz c. 1968

Personal information
- Nationality: Italian
- Born: 3 June 1944 (age 82) Mandelieu-la-Napoule, France
- Height: 1.79 m (5 ft 10 1/2 in)
- Weight: 67 kg (148 lb)

Sport
- Country: Italy
- Sport: Athletics
- Event: 110 metres hurdles
- Coached by: Sandro Calvesi
- Retired: 1969

Achievements and titles
- Personal best: 110 m hs: 13.46 (1968)
Medal record
Men's athletics
Representing Italy
Olympic Games
Bronze medal – third place	1968 Mexico City	110 m hurdles
European Championships
Gold medal – first place	1966 Budapest	110 m hurdles
Gold medal – first place	1969 Athens	110 m hurdles
European Indoor Championships
Gold medal – first place	1966 Dormund	60 m hurdles
Gold medal – first place	1967 Prague	50 m hurdles
Gold medal – first place	1968 Madrid	50 m hurdles
Universiade
Gold medal – first place	1965 Budapest	110 m hurdles
Gold medal – first place	1967 Tokyo	110 m hurdles

Eddy Ottoz (born 3 June 1944) is an Italian former athlete and bronze medalist at the 1968 Summer Olympics in the 110 metre hurdles.

== Biography ==
=== Sport career ===
Ottoz competed for Italy in the 1964 Summer Olympics held in Tokyo, Japan, and in the 1968 Summer Olympics held in Mexico City, Mexico where he won the bronze medal in the 110 metre hurdles event.

Ottoz won the British AAA Championships title in the 120 yards hurdles event at the 1967 AAA Championships.

=== In retirement ===
Ottoz retired from competitions in 1969, aged 25. He became an athletics coach in 1986, and by 1992 trained hurdlers and sprinters of the Italy national athletics team. As a sports manager he was president of the Regional Committee of the CONI of the Valle d'Aosta. Since 2001 he has been a member of the national board of the same Olympic Committee and chair of the Regional Committee FIDAL of Valle d'Aosta.

== National records ==
- 110 metres hurdles: 13.46 ( Mexico City, 17 October 1968) – held until 30 August 1994 when it was broken by his son Laurent with 13.42 seconds.

== Progression ==
Ottoz was in the top 25 world year list for six consecutive seasons.

Year	Performance	Venue	Date	World Ranking
1964	13.8	(Italy) Modena	30 Aug	11th
1965	13.6	(Hungary) Budapest	29 Aug	5th
1966	13.6	(Italy) Milan	9 Jun	3rd
1967	13.5	(Switzerland) Zürich	4 Jul	4th
1968	13.4	Mexico City	17 Oct	7th
1969	13.5	(Greece) Athens	20 Sep	5th

== Achievements ==
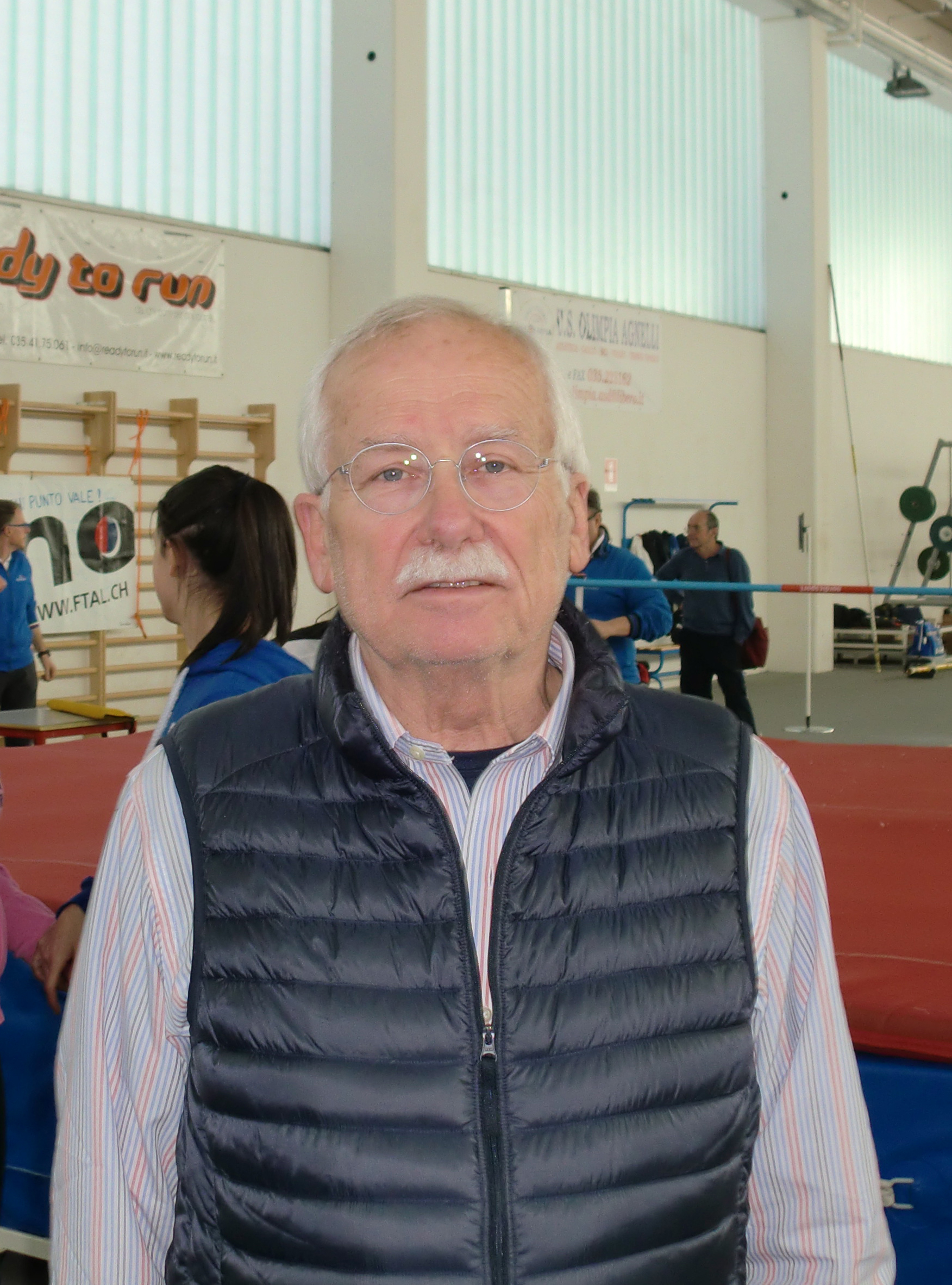
Eddy Ottoz in March 2015

British Pathe Highlights of 1966 European Championships, Eddy's victory @ 1:40 on YouTube

Year	Tournament	Venue	Result	Time	Notes
1964	Olympic Games	Tokyo, Japan	4th	13.84	
1965	Universiade	Budapest, Hungary	1st	13.6	
1966	European Indoor Games	Dortmund, West Germany	1st	7.7	
1966	European Championships	Budapest, Hungary	1st	13.7	
1967	European Indoor Games	Prague, Czechoslovakia	1st	6.4	
1967	Universiade	Tokyo, Japan	1st	13.9	
1968	European Indoor Games	Madrid, Spain	1st	6.52	
1968	Olympic Games	Mexico City, Mexico	3rd	13.46	
1969	European Championships	Athens, Greece	1st	13.5	

== National titles ==
- 5 wins in 110 metres hurdles at the Italian Athletics Championships (1965, 1966, 1967, 1968, 1969)

== See also ==
- Italian all-time lists – 110 metres hurdles
- Italy national athletics team – Multiple medalists
- Ottoz family
- FIDAL Hall of Fame
