= 110 metres hurdles =

Track and field hurdling event

Athletics 110 metres hurdles
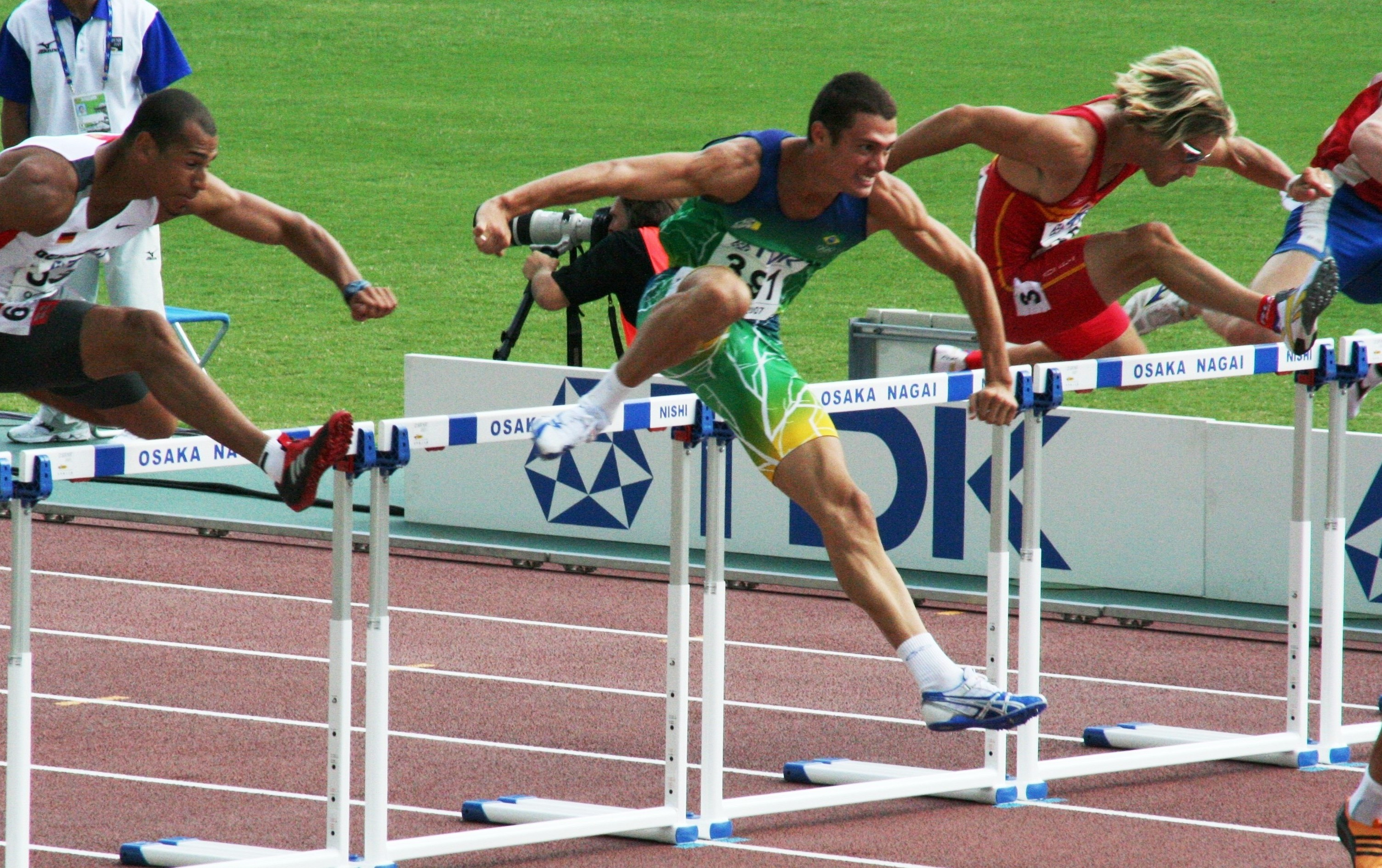
- A 110 m hurdles heat of the Decathlon at Osaka 2007

World records
- Men: Ja'Kobe Tharp (USA) 12.75 (2026)

Olympic records
- Men: Liu Xiang (CHN) 12.91 (2004)

World Championship records
- Men: Colin Jackson (GBR) 12.91 (1993)

The 110 metres hurdles, or 110-metre hurdles, is a hurdling track and field event for men. It is included in the athletics programme at the Summer Olympic Games. The female counterpart is the 100 metres hurdles. As part of a racing event, ten hurdles of 106.7 centimetres (42 in) in height are evenly spaced along a straight course of 110 metres. They are positioned so that they will fall over if bumped into by the runner. Fallen hurdles do not carry a fixed time penalty for the runners, but they have a significant pull-over weight which slows down the run. Like the 100 metres sprint, the 110 metres hurdles begins in the starting blocks. Hurdling is an Olympic event and happens regularly in the Olympics.

For the 110 m hurdles, the first hurdle is placed after a run-up of 13.72 metres (45 ft) from the starting line. The next nine hurdles are set at a distance of 9.14 metres (30 ft) from each other, and the home stretch from the last hurdle to the finish line is 14.02 metres (46 ft) long.

The Olympic Games have included the 110 metre hurdles in their program since 1896. The equivalent hurdles race for women was run over a course of 80 metres from 1932 to 1968. Starting with the 1972 Summer Olympics, the women's race was set at 100 metres. In the early 20th century, the race was often contested as the 120 yard hurdles, reflecting the distance between hurdles in imperial units.

The first hurdles races were held in England c. 1830, when wooden barriers were placed along a stretch of 100 yards (91.44 m). The first standard dimensions were introduced in 1864 in Oxford and Cambridge: the length of the course was set to 120 yards (109.7 m) with ten hurdles of height 42 inches (106.7 cm). The height and spacing of the hurdles have been expressed in imperial units ever since, except in Germany 1-metre high hurdles were used until 1907. The sport has been an Olympic discipline since the first modern Olympics in 1896. The length of the course was rounded up to 110 metres in France in 1888, which rapidly became the worldwide standard.

The massively constructed hurdles of the early days were first replaced in 1895 with somewhat lighter T-shaped hurdles that runners were able to knock over. Until 1935, runners were disqualified if they knocked down more than three hurdles, and records were only recognized if the runner had left all hurdles standing. In 1935, the T-shaped hurdles were replaced by L-shaped ones that easily fall forward if bumped into and therefore reduce the risk of injury. However, these hurdles are weighted, so it is disadvantageous to hit them.

The most popular running style takes the first hurdle on the run, with the upper body lowered (instead of jumping over it), then uses three steps between each of the subsequent hurdles. This style was first used by the 1900 Olympic champion, Alvin Kraenzlein.

== Women's history ==
Women ran the event occasionally in the 1920s, but it never became generally accepted.

From 1926 to 1968, women competed in the 80 metre hurdles, which was increased to 100 metres starting in 1961 on a trial basis, and was officially implemented in competition in 1969.

Currently, women run the 110 metre distance at the World Athletics Relays shuttle hurdle relay, which features two men and two women participating together. The event debuted at the 2019 event.

== Other events ==
In 1900 and 1904, the Olympics also included a 200-metre hurdles event, and the IAAF recognized world records for the 200 metre hurdles until 1960. Don Styron held the world record in the event for over 50 years, until Andy Turner broke the record in a specially arranged race at the Manchester City Games in 2010: Styron still holds the world record in the 220 yard low hurdles as of 2021.

== Technique ==
The sprint hurdles are a very rhythmic race because both men and women take 3 steps (meaning 4 foot strikes) between each hurdle, no matter whether running 110/100 metres outdoors, or the shorter distances indoors (55 or 60 metres). In addition, the distance from the starting line to the first hurdle – while shorter for women – is constant for both sexes whether indoors or outdoors, so sprint hurdlers do not need to change their stride pattern between indoor and outdoor seasons. One difference between indoor and outdoors is the shorter finishing distance from the last (5th) hurdle indoors, compared to longer distance from the last (10th) hurdle outdoors to the finish line.

Top male hurdlers traditionally took 8 strides from the starting blocks to the first hurdle (indoors and outdoors). The 8-step start persisted from (at least) the 1950s to the end of the 20th century and included such World- and Olympic champions as Harrison Dillard, Rod Milburn, Greg Foster, Renaldo Nehemiah, Roger Kingdom, Allen Johnson, Mark Crear, Mark McCoy, and Colin Jackson. However, beginning in the 2000s, some hurdle coaches embraced a transition to a faster 7-step start, teaching the men to lengthen their first few strides out of the starting blocks. Cuban hurdler Dayron Robles set his 2008 world record of 12.87 using a 7-step start. Chinese star Liu Xiang won the 2004 Olympics and broke the world record in 2006 utilizing an 8-step approach, but he switched to 7-steps by the 2011 outdoor season. After the 2010 outdoor season, American Jason Richardson trained to switch to a 7-step start and went on to win the 2011 World Championship. American Aries Merritt trained in Fall 2011 to switch from 8 to 7, and then had his greatest outdoor season in 2012 – running 8 races in under 13 seconds – capped by winning the London 2012 Olympics and then setting a world record of 12.80.

Of the 10 men with the fastest 110m hurdle times in 2012, seven used 7-steps, including the top 4: Aries Merritt, Liu Xiang, Jason Richardson, and David Oliver. Hurdle technique experts believe the off-season training required to produce the power and speed necessary to reach the first hurdle in 7 steps, yields greater endurance over the last half of the race. That added endurance allows hurdlers to maintain their top speed to the finish, resulting in a faster time.

== Junior-level competition ==
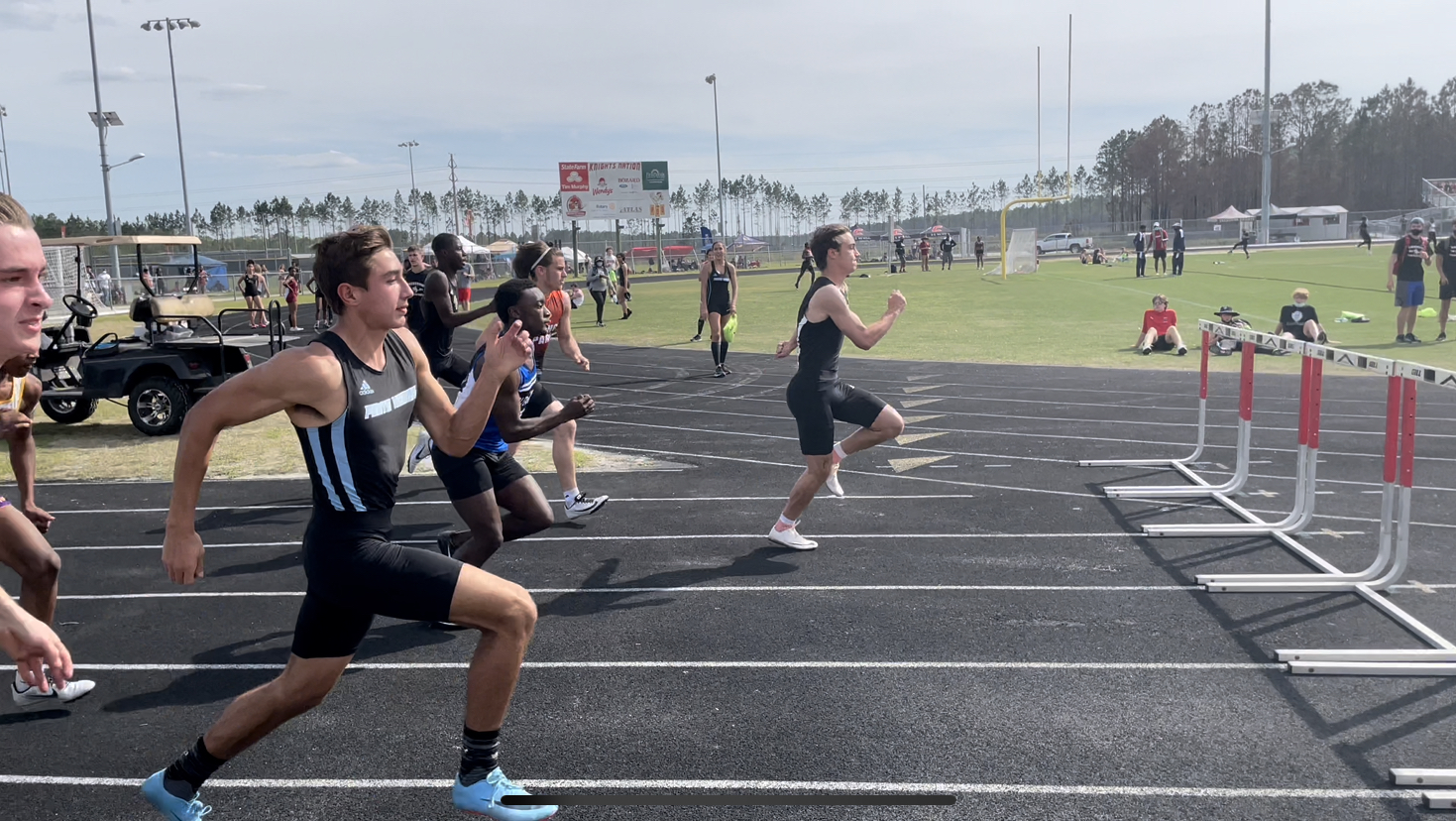
A 110 m hurdles race at the 2021 Creekside Friday knight invite

In American high school track and field and at many international Under-20 athletics competitions, the 110 metres hurdles are mostly the same as their professional counterparts. The main difference between the junior-level hurdles and professional hurdles is the height. Junior-level hurdles are 99.1 centimetres (39 in) tall while professional-level hurdles are 106.7 centimetres (42 in) tall. This change in height drastically changes the requirements placed on the hurdler to clear the barrier with the same amount of speed. Junior-level hurdling technique is the same as professional except on the higher hurdles everything is exaggerated. As a junior makes the transition to professional level there are many things they must adjust to, the most prevailing issue is getting down after clearing the hurdle. junior-level hurdlers are used to the normal sprinting motion right after they get off the hurdle but for a newly transitioned professional-level hurdler that extra half a second can feel very foreign. The second major difference in technique is the take-off distance. When a junior-level hurdler approaches his first hurdle they are putting as much power into each step as possible and attempting to gain all the speed they can so by their eighth step they'll be about 2 m away from the hurdle. When attempting to clear a 106 cm hurdle the athlete can no longer run headfirst into the hurdle with disregard for the height of the hurdle. Professional hurdler need to learn how to shorten their strides so they can take off the ground from farther away to clear a higher barrier.

Both before and after this change of technique world class hurdler, Aries Merritt was an elite level hurdler, at the peak of his high school career Aries Merritt achieved a still standing Wheeler High school record of 13.91 seconds. Almost all top level American hurdlers started their careers in high school including Roger Kingdom at Vienna high school and many more.

The world record in the 110m hurdles at the 99-cm height is 12.72 by Sasha Zhoya, achieved at the 2021 World Athletics U20 Championships – Men's 110 metres hurdles in Nairobi, Kenya on 21 August 2021. This time was matched by Le'Ezra Brown at the 2026 World Athletics U20 Championships.

== Milestones ==
- First official IAAF world record: 15.0 seconds, Forrest Smithson (USA), 1908
- First under 15 seconds: 14.8 seconds, Earl Thomson (CAN), 1920
- First under 14 seconds: 13.7 seconds, Forrest Towns (USA), 1936
- First under 13.5 seconds: 13.4 seconds, Jack Davis (USA), 1956
- First under 13 seconds: 12.93 seconds, Renaldo Nehemiah (USA), 1981
- First under 12.9 seconds: 12.88 seconds, Liu Xiang (CHN), 2006
- First under 12.8 seconds: 12.75 seconds, Ja'Kobe Tharp (USA), 2026

== Area records ==
- Updated 11 June 2026.

Area	Time (s)	Wind (m/s)	Season	Athlete
World	12.75	+1.0	2026	Ja'Kobe Tharp (USA)
Area records
Africa (records)	13.11	+1.8	2017	Antonio Alkana (RSA)
Asia (records)	12.88	+1.1	2006	Liu Xiang (CHN)
Europe (records)	12.91	+0.5	1993	Colin Jackson (GBR)
North, Central America and Caribbean (records)	12.75	+1.0	2026	Ja'Kobe Tharp (USA)
Oceania (records)	13.29	+0.6	1995	Kyle Vander-Kuyp (AUS)
South America (records)	13.17	+0.4	2022	Rafael Pereira (BRA)

== All-time top 25 ==
Table shows data for two definitions of "Top 25" - the top 25 110m hurdles times and the top 25 athletes:
- denotes top performance for athletes in the top 25 110m hurdles times
- denotes lesser performances, still in the top 25 110m hurdles times, by repeat athletes
- denotes top performance (only) for other top 25 athletes who fall outside the top 25 110m hurdles times

- Correct as of July 2026.

Ath.#	Perf.#	Time (s)	Wind (m/s)	Reaction (s)	Athlete	Nation	Date	Place	Ref.
1	1	12.75	+1.0		Ja'Kobe Tharp	United States	10 June 2026	Eugene	
2	2	12.80	+0.3	0.145	Aries Merritt	United States	7 September 2012	Brussels	
3	3	12.81	+1.8	0.169	Grant Holloway	United States	26 June 2021	Eugene	
4	4	12.84	+1.6	0.128	Devon Allen	United States	12 June 2022	New York City	
	5	12.85	−0.4		Tharp #2		14 July 2026	Budapest	
	6	12.86	+2.0		Holloway #2		28 June 2024	Eugene	
5	6	12.86	+1.8	0.166	Jamal Britt	United States	4 July 2026	Eugene	
6	8	12.87	+0.9		Dayron Robles	Cuba	12 June 2008	Ostrava	
6	8	12.87	+0.6	0.162	Cordell Tinch	United States	3 May 2025	Shaoxing	
8	10	12.88	+1.1		Liu Xiang	China	11 July 2006	Lausanne	
	10	12.88	+0.5		Robles #2		18 July 2008	Saint-Denis	
9	12	12.89	+0.5	0.161	David Oliver	United States	16 July 2010	Saint-Denis	
	12	12.89	+0.8	0.123	Britt #2		28 June 2026	Paris	
	12	12.89	+0.3	0.142	Tharp #3		18 July 2026	London	
10	15	12.90	+1.1		Dominique Arnold	United States	11 July 2006	Lausanne	
	15	12.90	+1.6	0.150	Oliver #2		3 July 2010	Eugene	
10	15	12.90	+0.7		Omar McLeod	Jamaica	24 June 2017	Kingston	
	15	12.90	−0.2		Tharp #4		12 June 2026	Eugene	
12	19	12.91	+0.5	0.122	Colin Jackson	Great Britain	20 August 1993	Stuttgart	
	19	12.91	+0.3	0.139	Liu #2		27 August 2004	Athens	
	19	12.91	+0.2		Robles #3		22 July 2008	Stockholm	
	19	12.91	+1.8	0.152	Tharp #5		4 July 2026	Eugene	
13	23	12.92	−0.1		Roger Kingdom	United States	16 August 1989	Zurich	
13	23	12.92	+0.9		Allen Johnson	United States	23 June 1996	Atlanta	
	23	12.92	+0.2		Johnson #2		23 August 1996	Brussels	
	23	12.92	+1.5		Liu #3		2 June 2007	New York City	
	23	12.92	±0.0		Robles #4		23 September 2007	Stuttgart	
	23	12.92	−0.3	0.143	Merritt #2		8 August 2012	London	
13	23	12.92	+0.6	0.169	Sergey Shubenkov	Russia	2 July 2018	Székesfehérvár	
	23	12.92	+0.8		Holloway #3		24 June 2024	Eugene	
13	23	12.92	+0.6		Rachid Muratake	Japan	16 August 2025	Fukui	
	23	12.92	+0.3	0.124	Tinch #2		28 August 2025	Zurich	
17		12.93	−0.1		Renaldo Nehemiah	United States	19 August 1981	Zurich	
17		12.93	+0.9	0.168	Hansle Parchment	Jamaica	17 September 2023	Eugene	
17		12.93	+2.0		Freddie Crittenden	United States	28 June 2024	Eugene	
20		12.94	+1.6		Jack Pierce	United States	22 June 1996	Atlanta	
20		12.94	+0.5		Orlando Ortega	Cuba	4 July 2015	Saint-Denis	
20		12.94	+0.7		Rasheed Broadbell	Jamaica	9 July 2023	Kingston	
23		12.95	+1.5		Terrence Trammell	United States	2 June 2007	New York City	
23		12.95	+0.3		Pascal Martinot-Lagarde	France	18 July 2014	Monaco	
23		12.95	−0.2		Kendrick Smallwood	United States	12 June 2026	Eugene	

=== Assisted marks ===
Any performance with a following wind of more than 2.0 metres per second does not count for record purposes. Below is a list of all wind-assisted times equal or superior to 12.95:

- Roger Kingdom (USA) ran 12.87 (+2.6) in Barcelona on 10 September 1989.
- Liu Xiang (CHN) ran 12.87 (+2.4) in Eugene, Oregon on 2 June 2012.
- Cordell Tinch (USA) ran 12.87 A (+6.0) in Pueblo, Colorado on 27 May 2023.
- David Oliver (USA) ran 12.89 (+3.2) in Eugene, Oregon on 6 July 2008.
- Renaldo Nehemiah (USA) ran 12.91 (+3.5) in Champaign, Illinois on 1 June 1979.
- Jamal Britt (USA) ran 12.91 (+3.2) in Memphis, Tennessee on 11 July 2026.
- Colin Jackson (GBR) ran 12.94 A (+2.8) in Sestriere on 31 July 1994.

== Most successful athletes ==
Athletes with two or more victories at the Olympic Games & World Championships:

5 wins:

- Allen Johnson has won the most 110 m hurdles titles at Olympic and World level, one Olympic (1996) & four World (1995, 1997, 2001, 2003)

4 wins:

Grant Holloway has won one Olympic hurdle title (Paris 2024) three World Championship titles, 2019, 2022, & 2023 (also won Olympic silver in Tokyo 2020)

3 wins:

- Greg Foster, three World Championship titles, 1983, 1987 & 1991 (also won Olympic silver in 1984)

2 wins:

- Lee Calhoun (USA), two Olympic victories, 1956, 1960
- Roger Kingdom (USA), two Olympic victories, 1984 and 1988
- Colin Jackson (GBR), two World Championship victories, 1993 and 1999 (also won Olympic Silver in 1988)
- Liu Xiang (CHN), Olympic, 2004, World, 2007
- Omar McLeod (JAM), Olympic, 2016, World, 2017

== Olympic Games medalists ==
Games	Gold	Silver	Bronze
1896 Athens	Thomas Curtis; United States	Grantley Goulding; Great Britain	none awarded
1900 Paris	Alvin Kraenzlein; United States	John McLean; United States	Fred Moloney; United States
1904 St. Louis	Frederick Schule; United States	Thaddeus Shideler; United States	Lesley Ashburner; United States
1908 London	Forrest Smithson; United States	John Garrels; United States	Arthur Shaw; United States
1912 Stockholm	Fred Kelly; United States	James Wendell; United States	Martin Hawkins; United States
1920 Antwerp	Earl Thomson; Canada	Harold Barron; United States	Feg Murray; United States
1924 Paris	Daniel Kinsey; United States	Sid Atkinson; South Africa	Sten Pettersson; Sweden
1928 Amsterdam	Sid Atkinson; South Africa	Steve Anderson; United States	John Collier; United States
1932 Los Angeles	George Saling; United States	Percy Beard; United States	Don Finlay; Great Britain
1936 Berlin	Forrest Towns; United States	Don Finlay; Great Britain	Fritz Pollard; United States
1948 London	William Porter; United States	Clyde Scott; United States	Craig Dixon; United States
1952 Helsinki	Harrison Dillard; United States	Jack Davis; United States	Arthur Barnard; United States
1956 Melbourne	Lee Calhoun; United States	Jack Davis; United States	Joel Shankle; United States
1960 Rome	Lee Calhoun; United States	Willie May; United States	Hayes Jones; United States
1964 Tokyo	Hayes Jones; United States	Blaine Lindgren; United States	Anatoly Mikhailov; Soviet Union
1968 Mexico City	Willie Davenport; United States	Ervin Hall; United States	Eddy Ottoz; Italy
1972 Munich	Rod Milburn; United States	Guy Drut; France	Thomas Hill; United States
1976 Montreal	Guy Drut; France	Alejandro Casañas; Cuba	Willie Davenport; United States
1980 Moscow	Thomas Munkelt; East Germany	Alejandro Casañas; Cuba	Aleksandr Puchkov; Soviet Union
1984 Los Angeles	Roger Kingdom; United States	Greg Foster; United States	Arto Bryggare; Finland
1988 Seoul	Roger Kingdom; United States	Colin Jackson; Great Britain	Tonie Campbell; United States
1992 Barcelona	Mark McKoy; Canada	Tony Dees; United States	Jack Pierce; United States
1996 Atlanta	Allen Johnson; United States	Mark Crear; United States	Florian Schwarthoff; Germany
2000 Sydney	Anier García; Cuba	Terrence Trammell; United States	Mark Crear; United States
2004 Athens	Liu Xiang; China	Terrence Trammell; United States	Anier García; Cuba
2008 Beijing	Dayron Robles; Cuba	David Payne; United States	David Oliver; United States
2012 London	Aries Merritt; United States	Jason Richardson; United States	Hansle Parchment; Jamaica
2016 Rio de Janeiro	Omar McLeod; Jamaica	Orlando Ortega; Spain	Dimitri Bascou; France
2020 Tokyo	Hansle Parchment; Jamaica	Grant Holloway; United States	Ronald Levy; Jamaica
2024 Paris	Grant Holloway; United States	Daniel Roberts; United States	Rasheed Broadbell; Jamaica
2028 Los Angeles			

== World Championships medalists ==
Championships	Gold	Silver	Bronze
1983 Helsinki	Greg Foster (USA)	Arto Bryggare (FIN)	Willie Gault (USA)
1987 Rome	Greg Foster (USA)	Jon Ridgeon (GBR)	Colin Jackson (GBR)
1991 Tokyo	Greg Foster (USA)	Jack Pierce (USA)	Tony Jarrett (GBR)
1993 Stuttgart	Colin Jackson (GBR)	Tony Jarrett (GBR)	Jack Pierce (USA)
1995 Gothenburg	Allen Johnson (USA)	Tony Jarrett (GBR)	Roger Kingdom (USA)
1997 Athens	Allen Johnson (USA)	Colin Jackson (GBR)	Igor Kováč (SVK)
1999 Seville	Colin Jackson (GBR)	Anier García (CUB)	Duane Ross (USA)
2001 Edmonton	Allen Johnson (USA)	Anier García (CUB)	Dudley Dorival (HAI)
2003 Saint-Denis	Allen Johnson (USA)	Terrence Trammell (USA)	Liu Xiang (CHN)
2005 Helsinki	Ladji Doucouré (FRA)	Liu Xiang (CHN)	Allen Johnson (USA)
2007 Osaka	Liu Xiang (CHN)	Terrence Trammell (USA)	David Payne (USA)
2009 Berlin	Ryan Brathwaite (BAR)	Terrence Trammell (USA)	David Payne (USA)
2011 Daegu	Jason Richardson (USA)	Liu Xiang (CHN)	Andy Turner (GBR)
2013 Moscow	David Oliver (USA)	Ryan Wilson (USA)	Sergey Shubenkov (RUS)
2015 Beijing	Sergey Shubenkov (RUS)	Hansle Parchment (JAM)	Aries Merritt (USA)
2017 London	Omar McLeod (JAM)	Sergey Shubenkov (ANA)	Balázs Baji (HUN)
2019 Doha	Grant Holloway (USA)	Sergey Shubenkov (ANA)	Pascal Martinot-Lagarde (FRA) Orlando Ortega (ESP)
2022 Eugene	Grant Holloway (USA)	Trey Cunningham (USA)	Asier Martínez (ESP)
2023 Budapest	Grant Holloway (USA)	Hansle Parchment (JAM)	Daniel Roberts (USA)
2025 Tokyo	Cordell Tinch (USA)	Orlando Bennett (JAM)	Tyler Mason (JAM)

==== Medal table ====
Rank	Nation	Gold	Silver	Bronze	Total
1	United States (USA)	13	6	9	28
2	Great Britain (GBR)	2	4	3	9
3	Jamaica (JAM)	1	3	1	5
4	China (CHN)	1	2	1	4
5	France (FRA)	1	0	1	2
5	Russia (RUS)	1	0	1	2
7	Barbados (BRB)	1	0	0	1
8	Cuba (CUB)	0	2	0	2
–	Authorised Neutral Athletes (ANA)	0	2	0	2
9	Finland (FIN)	0	1	0	1
10	Spain (ESP)	0	0	2	2
11	Haiti (HAI)	0	0	1	1
11	Hungary (HUN)	0	0	1	1
11	Slovakia (SVK)	0	0	1	1
Totals (13 entries)		20	20	21	61

== World leading times ==
Year	Time	Athlete	Place
1966	13.47	Willie Davenport (USA)	New York City
1967	13.43	Earl McCullouch (USA)	Minneapolis
1968	13.33 A	Willie Davenport (USA)	Mexico City
1969	13.45	Willie Davenport (USA)	Miami
1969	13.45	Leon Coleman (USA)	Miami
1970	13.42	Thomas Hill (USA)	Bakersfield
1971	13.46 A	Rod Milburn (USA)	Cali
1972	13.24	Rod Milburn (USA)	Munich
1973	13.41	Rod Milburn (USA)	Zurich
1974	13.40	Guy Drut (FRA)	Rome
1975	13.28	Guy Drut (FRA)	Saint-Étienne
1976	13.30	Guy Drut (FRA)	Montreal
1977	13.21	Alejandro Casañas (CUB)	Sofia
1978	13.22	Greg Foster (USA)	Eugene
1979	13.00	Renaldo Nehemiah (USA)	Westwood
1980	13.21	Renaldo Nehemiah (USA)	Zurich
1981	12.93	Renaldo Nehemiah (USA)	Zurich
1982	13.22	Greg Foster (USA)	Koblenz
1983	13.11	Greg Foster (USA)	Westwood
1984	13.15	Greg Foster (USA)	Zurich
1985	13.14	Roger Kingdom (USA)	Modesto
1986	13.20	Stéphane Caristan (FRA)	Stuttgart
1987	13.17	Greg Foster (USA)	Lausanne
1988	12.97 A	Roger Kingdom (USA)	Sestriere
1989	12.92	Roger Kingdom (USA)	Zurich
1990	13.08	Colin Jackson (GBR)	Auckland
1991	13.05	Tony Dees (USA)	Vigo
1992	13.04	Colin Jackson (GBR)	Cologne
1993	12.91	Colin Jackson (GBR)	Stuttgart
1994	12.98	Colin Jackson (GBR)	Tokyo
1995	12.98	Allen Johnson (USA)	Cologne
1996	12.92	Allen Johnson (USA)	Atlanta
1997	12.93	Allen Johnson (USA)	Athens
1998	12.98	Allen Johnson (USA)	Zurich
1999	12.98	Mark Crear (USA)	Zagreb
2000	12.97	Allen Johnson (USA)	Sacramento
2001	13.04	Allen Johnson (USA)	Edmonton
2002	13.03	Anier García (CUB)	Lausanne
2003	12.97	Allen Johnson (USA)	Saint-Denis
2004	12.91	Liu Xiang (CHN)	Athens
2005	12.97	Ladji Doucouré (FRA)	Angers
2006	12.88	Liu Xiang (CHN)	Lausanne
2007	12.92	Liu Xiang (CHN)	New York City
2007	12.92	Dayron Robles (CUB)	Stuttgart
2008	12.87	Dayron Robles (CUB)	Ostrava
2009	13.04	Dayron Robles (CUB)	Ostrava
2010	12.89	David Oliver (USA)	Saint-Denis
2011	12.94	David Oliver (USA)	Eugene
2012	12.80	Aries Merritt (USA)	Brussels
2013	13.00	David Oliver (USA)	Moscow
2014	12.94	Hansle Parchment (JAM)	Saint-Denis
2015	12.94	Orlando Ortega (CUB)	Saint-Denis
2016	12.98	Omar McLeod (JAM)	Shanghai
2017	12.90	Omar McLeod (JAM)	Kingston
2018	12.92	Sergey Shubenkov (RUS)	Székesfehérvár
2019	12.98	Grant Holloway (USA)	Austin
2020	13.11	Orlando Ortega (ESP)	Monaco
2021	12.81	Grant Holloway (USA)	Eugene
2022	12.84	Devon Allen (USA)	New York City
2023	12.93	Hansle Parchment (JAM)	Eugene
2024	12.86	Grant Holloway (USA)	Eugene
2025	12.87	Cordell Tinch (USA)	Shaoxing
2026	12.75	Ja'Kobe Tharp (USA)	Eugene
