= Athletics at the 1966 British Empire and Commonwealth Games – Men's 4 × 110 yards relay =

Men's 4 × 110 yards relay at the 1966 British Empire and Commonwealth Games
- Venue: Independence Park, Kingston
- Dates: August 13, 1966

Medalists
gold medal	Ghana	Ghana
silver medal	Jamaica	Jamaica
bronze medal	Australia	Australia

The men's 4 × 110 yards relay event at the 1966 British Empire and Commonwealth Games was held on 13 August at the Independence Park in Kingston, Jamaica. It was the last time that the imperial distance was contested at the Games: from 1970 it was replaced by the 4 × 100 metres relay.

== Medalists ==
Medallists
Gold	Silver	Bronze
Ghana; Ebenezer Addy; Bonner Mends; James Addy; Stanley Allotey	Jamaica; Wes Clayton; Pablo McNeil; Lynn Headley; Michael Fray	Australia; Gary Eddy; Allen Crawley; Gary Holdsworth; Peter Norman

== Results ==
=== Heats ===
Qualification: First 3 teams of each heat (Q) and the next 2 fastest (q) qualified for the final.

Rank	Heat	Nation	Athletes	Time	Notes
1	1	Canada	Bohdan Domansky, Edmund Hearne, Harry Jerome, Terrance Tomlinson	40.5	Q
2	1	Australia	Gary Eddy, Allen Crawley, Gary Holdsworth, Peter Norman	40.6	Q
3	1	England	Barrie Kelly, Dave Dear, David Jones, Mel Cheskin	41.0	Q
4	1	Trinidad and Tobago	Cipriani Phillip, Clifton Bertrand, Henry Noel, Winston Short	41.0	q
5	1	Bermuda	Colin Davey, Ewert Brown, John Morbey, Noel Simons	42.6	
6	1	Sierra Leone	Abdulai Conteh, Edward Pratt, Nicholas Nicol, Raymond Kargbo	42.8	
1	2	Ghana	Ebenezer Addy, Bonner Mends, James Addy, Stanley Allotey	39.9	Q, GR
2	2	Jamaica	Wes Clayton, Pablo McNeil, Lynn Headley, Michael Fray	40.5	Q
3	2	Wales	Lynn Davies, Ron Jones, Terry Davies, Keri Jones	40.6	Q
4	2	Nigeria	David Ejoke, Folu Erinle, Omubo Peters, Sydney Asiodu	41.0	q
	2	Bahamas	Bernard Nottage, Kevin Johnson, George Collie, Tom Robinson	DQ	

=== Final ===
Rank	Lanes	Nation	Athletes	Time	Notes
1st place, gold medalist(s)	8	Ghana	Ebenezer Addy, Bonner Mends, James Addy, Stanley Allotey	39.8	GR
2nd place, silver medalist(s)	1	Jamaica	Wes Clayton, Pablo McNeil, Lynn Headley, Michael Fray	40.0	
3rd place, bronze medalist(s)	3	Australia	Gary Eddy, Allen Crawley, Gary Holdsworth, Peter Norman	40.0	
4	5	Wales	Terry Davies, Lynn Davies, Ron Jones, William Jones	40.2	
5	7	Canada	Bohdan Domansky, Edmund Hearne, Harry Jerome, Terrance Tomlinson	40.4	
6	4	Nigeria	David Ejoke, Folu Erinle, Omubo Peters, Sydney Asiodu	40.4	
7	2	England	David Jones, Barrie Kelly, Dave Dear, Mel Cheskin	40.9	
8	6	Trinidad and Tobago	Cipriani Phillip, Clifton Bertrand, Henry Noel, Winston Short	41.3	
