= Athletics at the 1966 British Empire and Commonwealth Games – Men's 220 yards =

Men's 220 yards at the Commonwealth Games

The men's 220 yards event at the 1966 British Empire and Commonwealth Games was held on 8 and 11 August at the Independence Park in Kingston, Jamaica. It was the last time that the imperial distance was contested at the Games later replaced by the 200 metres.

== Medalists ==
Medallists
Gold	Silver	Bronze
Stanley Allotey; Ghana	Edwin Roberts; Trinidad and Tobago	David Ejoke; Nigeria

== Results ==
=== Heats ===
Qualification: First 4 in each heat (Q) qualify directly for the quarterfinals.

Wind:
Heat 1: +0.2 m/s, Heat 2: ? m/s, Heat 3: -4.0 m/s, Heat 4: ? m/s, Heat 5: -5.7 m/s, Heat 6: ? m/s, Heat 7: ? m/s, Heat 8: ? m/s

Results of heats: Q means qualified for quarterfinals
Rank	Heat	Name	Nationality	Time	Notes
1	1	Gary Holdsworth	Australia	21.8	Q
2	1	Bernard Nottage	Bahamas	21.8	Q
3	1	Clifton Bertrand	Trinidad and Tobago	21.8	Q
4	1	Ross McKenzie	Canada	21.8	Q
5	1	Norman Chihota	Tanzania	22.3	
6	1	Philip Musondu	Kenya	22.3	
7	1	Aggrey Jacobs	Antigua and Barbuda	22.9	
1	2	Edwin Roberts	Trinidad and Tobago	21.4	Q
2	2	Sydney Asiodu	Nigeria	21.9	Q
3	2	Terrance Tomlinson	Canada	22.0	Q
4	2	Colin Thurton	British Honduras	22.9	Q
5	2	Edward Pratt	Sierra Leone	23.7	
	2	Ebenezer Addy	Ghana	DNS	
	2	Lynn Davies	Wales	DNS	
1	3	Peter Norman	Australia	21.7	Q
2	3	Winston Short	Trinidad and Tobago	21.9	Q
3	3	George Collie	Bahamas	22.1	Q
4	3	Terry Davies	Wales	22.4	Q
5	3	Olaniyi Adekunle	Nigeria	22.7	
6	3	Clement Cure	Mauritius	23.3	
	3	Kenneth Powell	India	DNS	
1	4	Harry Jerome	Canada	21.7	Q
2	4	Mel Cheskin	England	21.9	Q
3	4	John Owiti	Kenya	22.2	Q
4	4	E. Donkor	Ghana	22.3	Q
5	4	Omubo Peters	Nigeria	22.5	
6	4	Abdulai Conteh	Sierra Leone	22.8	
7	4	Anthony Cadogan	Barbados	23.2	
1	5	Gary Eddy	Australia	21.8	Q
2	5	James Addy	Ghana	22.0	Q
3	5	Dave Dear	England	22.1	Q
4	5	Keri Jones	Wales	22.3	Q
5	5	Franz Merven	Mauritius	23.0	
6	5	Raymond Kargbo	Sierra Leone	23.2	
1	6	David Ejoke	Nigeria	21.7	Q
2	6	Michael Fray	Jamaica	21.9	Q
3	6	Henry Noel	Trinidad and Tobago	22.2	Q
4	6	David Jones	England	22.5	Q
5	6	Howard Davies	Wales	22.9	
6	6	Victor Peters	Saint Vincent and the Grenadines	23.4	
7	6	Apmelody Kaumata	Papua New Guinea	23.8	
1	7	Menzies Campbell	Scotland	21.4	Q
2	7	Manikavasagam Jegathesan	Malaysia	21.4	Q
3	7	Clifton Forbes	Jamaica	21.6	Q
4	7	Ajmer Singh	India	21.8	Q
5	7	Kevin Johnson	Bahamas	22.2	
6	7	Johnny Kilpatrick	Northern Ireland	22.2	
	7	Gaston Clarenc	Mauritius	DNS	
1	8	Stanley Allotey	Ghana	20.9	Q
2	8	Tom Robinson	Bahamas	21.7	Q
3	8	Don Domansky	Canada	21.7	Q
4	8	Pablo McNeil	Jamaica	21.8	Q
5	8	Canagasabai Kunalan	Singapore	22.2	
6	8	Yassin Abdi	Aden	25.6	
	8	George Patton	Guyana	DNS	
	8	Julius Sang	Kenya	DNS	

=== Quarterfinals ===
Qualification: First 4 in each heat (Q) qualify directly for the semifinals.

Wind:
Heat 1: 0.0 m/s, Heat 2: +0.6 m/s, Heat 3: ? m/s, Heat 4: +0.1 m/s

Quarterfinal heats results
Rank	Heat	Name	Nationality	Time	Notes
1	1	Gary Eddy	Australia	20.8	Q, GR
2	1	David Ejoke	Nigeria	21.0	Q
3	1	Manikavasagam Jegathesan	Malaysia	21.1	Q
4	1	James Addy	Ghana	21.5	Q
5	1	David Jones	England	21.8	
6	1	Ajmer Singh	India	21.8	
7	1	Terrance Tomlinson	Canada	22.0	
	1	Clifton Bertrand	Trinidad and Tobago	DNS	
1	2	Harry Jerome	Canada	21.2	Q
2	2	Menzies Campbell	Scotland	21.3	Q
3	2	Gary Holdsworth	Australia	21.3	Q
4	2	Winston Short	Trinidad and Tobago	21.5	Q
5	2	Pablo McNeil	Jamaica	21.7	
6	2	George Collie	Bahamas	21.8	
7	2	Mel Cheskin	England	21.9	
8	2	William Jones	Wales	22.0	
1	3	Edwin Roberts	Trinidad and Tobago	21.1	Q
2	3	Don Domansky	Canada	21.3	Q
3	3	Michael Fray	Jamaica	21.5	Q
4	3	John Owiti	Kenya	21.9	Q
5	3	Sydney Asiodu	Nigeria	22.0	
6	3	Terry Davies	Wales	22.0	
7	3	E. Donkor	Ghana	22.3	
	3	Tom Robinson	Bahamas	DNS	
1	4	Stanley Allotey	Ghana	20.7	Q, GR
2	4	Henry Noel	Trinidad and Tobago	21.5	Q
3	4	Peter Norman	Australia	21.5	Q
4	4	Dave Dear	England	21.7	Q
5	4	Bernard Nottage	Bahamas	21.7	
6	4	Clifton Forbes	Jamaica	21.8	
7	4	Ross McKenzie	Canada	21.8	
8	4	Colin Thurton	British Honduras	23.0	

=== Semifinals ===
Qualification: First 4 in each heat (Q) qualify directly for the final.

Wind:
Heat 1: 0.0 m/s, Heat 2: +0.5 m/s

Semifinal results
Rank	Heat	Name	Nationality	Time	Notes
1	1	Stanley Allotey	Ghana	20.6	Q, GR
2	1	Edwin Roberts	Trinidad and Tobago	20.8	Q
3	1	Don Domansky	Canada	21.0	Q
4	1	Manikavasagam Jegathesan	Malaysia	21.1	Q
5	1	Menzies Campbell	Scotland	21.2	
6	1	Peter Norman	Australia	21.2	
7	1	Michael Fray	Jamaica	21.3	
8	1	Dave Dear	England	21.8	
1	2	Gary Eddy	Australia	21.1	Q
2	2	Harry Jerome	Canada	21.1	Q
3	2	David Ejoke	Nigeria	21.2	Q
4	2	Gary Holdsworth	Australia	21.3	Q
5	2	James Addy	Ghana	21.5	
6	2	Henry Noel	Trinidad and Tobago	21.6	
7	2	Winston Short	Trinidad and Tobago	21.8	
8	2	John Owiti	Kenya	21.9	

=== Final ===
Wind: +1.0 m/s

Final results
Rank	Name	Nationality	Time	Notes
1st place, gold medalist(s)	Stanley Allotey	Ghana	20.65	GR
2nd place, silver medalist(s)	Edwin Roberts	Trinidad and Tobago	20.93	
3rd place, bronze medalist(s)	David Ejoke	Nigeria	20.95	
4	Gary Eddy	Australia	21.05	
5	Don Domansky	Canada	21.0	
6	Gary Holdsworth	Australia	21.40	
7	Harry Jerome	Canada	21.4	
8	Manikavasagam Jegathesan	Malaysia	21.5	
