= Athletics at the 1966 British Empire and Commonwealth Games – Men's 100 yards =

Men's 100 yards at the 1966 British Empire and Commonwealth Games
- Venue: Independence Park
- Dates: 5-6 August
- Competitors: 54 from 24 nations
- Winning time: 9.41

Medalists
| gold medal | Harry Jerome | Canada |
| silver medal | Tom Robinson | Bahamas |
| bronze medal | Edwin Roberts | Trinidad and Tobago |

The men's 100 yards event at the 1966 British Empire and Commonwealth Games was held on 5 and 6 August at the Independence Park in Kingston, Jamaica. It was the last time that the imperial distance was contested at the Games later replaced by the 100 metres.

== Results ==
=== Heats ===
Qualification: First 4 in each heat (Q) qualify directly for the quarterfinals.

Wind:

- Heat 1: ? m/s
- Heat 2: ? m/s
- Heat 3: 0.0 m/s
- Heat 4: ? m/s
- Heat 5: -6.0 m/s
- Heat 6: -3.0 m/s
- Heat 7: ? m/s
- Heat 8: -4.0m/s

Heats results: Q means qualified for next round , all columns sortable
| Rank | Heat | Name | Nationality | Time | Notes |
|---|---|---|---|---|---|
| 1 | 1 | Harry Jerome | Canada | 9.8 | Q |
| 2 | 1 | Ebenezer Addy | Ghana | 9.9 | Q |
| 3 | 1 | George Collie | Bahamas | 9.9 | Q |
| 4 | 1 | John Morbey | Bermuda | 10.3 | Q |
| 5 | 1 | Terry Davies | Wales | 10.3 | |
| 6 | 1 | Gaston Clarenc | Mauritius | 10.5 | |
| | 1 | Manikavasagam Jegathesan | Malaysia | DNS | |
| 1 | 2 | Edwin Roberts | Trinidad and Tobago | 9.7 | Q |
| 2 | 2 | Tom Robinson | Bahamas | 9.7 | Q |
| 3 | 2 | Bob Frith | England | 9.9 | Q |
| 4 | 2 | Edmund Hearne | Canada | 9.9 | Q |
| 5 | 2 | Colin Thurton | British Honduras | 10.3 | |
| 6 | 2 | Apmelody Kaumata | Papua New Guinea | 10.3 | |
| 7 | 2 | Philip Musondu | Kenya | 10.3 | |
| 1 | 3 | David Ejoke | Nigeria | 9.9 | Q |
| 2 | 3 | Gary Eddy | Australia | 9.93 | Q |
| 3 | 3 | Eric Collins | Jamaica | 9.9 | Q |
| 4 | 3 | Lynn Davies | Wales | 10.0 | Q |
| 5 | 3 | Abdulai Conteh | Sierra Leone | 10.2 | |
| | 3 | Franz Merven | Mauritius | DNS | |
| 1 | 4 | John Owiti | Kenya | 10.0 | Q |
| 2 | 4 | Menzies Campbell | Scotland | 10.0 | Q |
| 3 | 4 | Olaniyi Adekunle | Nigeria | 10.0 | Q |
| 4 | 4 | Pablo McNeill | Jamaica | 10.1 | Q |
| 5 | 4 | Johnny Kilpatrick | Northern Ireland | 10.1 | |
| 6 | 4 | Clement Cure | Mauritius | 10.6 | |
| 1 | 5 | Barrie Kelly | England | 10.3 | Q |
| 2 | 5 | Winston Short | Trinidad and Tobago | 10.3 | Q |
| 3 | 5 | Bernard Nottage | Bahamas | 10.5 | Q |
| 4 | 5 | Peter Norman | Australia | 10.59 | Q |
| 5 | 5 | Canagasabai Kunalan | Singapore | 10.5 | |
| 6 | 5 | Norman Chihota | Tanzania | 10.6 | |
| 7 | 5 | Edward Pratt | Sierra Leone | 10.8 | |
| 1 | 6 | Stanley Allotey | Ghana | 10.0 | Q |
| 2 | 6 | Gary Holdsworth | Australia | 10.23 | Q |
| 3 | 6 | Cipriani Phillip | Trinidad and Tobago | 10.3 | Q |
| 4 | 6 | Keri Jones | Wales | 10.4 | Q |
| 5 | 6 | Terrance Tomlinson | Canada | 10.4 | |
| 6 | 6 | Kevin Johnson | Bahamas | 10.6 | |
| 7 | 6 | Raymond Kargbo | Sierra Leone | 10.8 | |
| 1 | 7 | Lennox Miller | Jamaica | 10.1 | Q |
| 2 | 7 | E. Donkor | Ghana | 10.2 | Q |
| 3 | 7 | Omubo Peters | Nigeria | 10.4 | Q |
| 4 | 7 | Ron Jones | Wales | 10.4 | Q |
| 5 | 7 | Desmond Hibbert | Gibraltar | 10.5 | |
| 6 | 7 | Kenneth Powell | India | 10.5 | |
| 7 | 7 | Silas Tita | Papua New Guinea | 10.7 | |
| 1 | 8 | Bonner Mends | Ghana | 9.9 | Q |
| 2 | 8 | Lynn Headley | Jamaica | 9.9 | Q |
| 3 | 8 | Sydney Asiodu | Nigeria | 9.9 | Q |
| 4 | 8 | Allen Crawley | Australia | 10.15 | Q |
| 5 | 8 | Bob McStocker | England | 10.3 | |
| 6 | 8 | George Patton | Guyana | 10.3 | |
| 7 | 8 | Yassin Abdi | Aden | 10.5 | |

=== Quarterfinals ===
Qualification: First 4 in each heat (Q) qualify directly for the semifinals.

Wind:

- Heat 1: -5.0 m/s
- Heat 2: -1.8 m/s
- Heat 3: -0.9 m/s
- Heat 4: -2.0 m/s

Quarterfinal results, sortable
| Rank | Heat | Name | Nationality | Time | Notes |
|---|---|---|---|---|---|
| 1 | 1 | Lennox Miller | Jamaica | 9.9 | Q |
| 2 | 1 | John Owiti | Kenya | 9.9 | Q |
| 3 | 1 | Ebenezer Addy | Ghana | 9.9 | Q |
| 4 | 1 | Lynn Davies | Wales | 10.0 | Q |
| 5 | 1 | Menzies Campbell | Scotland | 10.0 | |
| 6 | 1 | Peter Norman | Australia | 10.27 | |
| 7 | 1 | Omubo Peters | Nigeria | 10.3 | |
| 8 | 1 | Bob Frith | England | 10.3 | |
| 1 | 2 | Edwin Roberts | Trinidad and Tobago | 9.7 | Q |
| 2 | 2 | Lynn Headley | Jamaica | 9.8 | Q |
| 3 | 2 | David Ejoke | Nigeria | 9.9 | Q |
| 4 | 2 | Gary Holdsworth | Australia | 10.01 | Q |
| 5 | 2 | Bernard Nottage | Bahamas | 10.0 | |
| 6 | 2 | E. Donkor | Ghana | 10.1 | |
| 7 | 2 | Keri Jones | Wales | 10.1 | |
| 8 | 2 | Edmund Hearne | Canada | 10.1 | |
| 1 | 3 | Harry Jerome | Canada | 9.7 | Q |
| 2 | 3 | Stanley Allotey | Ghana | 9.7 | Q |
| 3 | 3 | Sydney Asiodu | Nigeria | 9.8 | Q |
| 4 | 3 | Barrie Kelly | England | 9.8 | Q |
| 5 | 3 | George Collie | Bahamas | 9.9 | |
| 6 | 3 | Pablo McNeill | Jamaica | 10.0 | |
| 7 | 3 | Winston Short | Trinidad and Tobago | 10.0 | |
| 8 | 3 | Allen Crawley | Australia | 10.01 | |
| 1 | 4 | Tom Robinson | Bahamas | 9.7 | Q |
| 2 | 4 | Eric Collins | Jamaica | 9.7 | Q |
| 3 | 4 | Gary Eddy | Australia | 9.88 | Q |
| 4 | 4 | Bonner Mends | Ghana | 9.8 | Q |
| 5 | 4 | Ron Jones | Wales | 10.0 | |
| 6 | 4 | John Morbey | Bermuda | 10.0 | |
| 7 | 4 | Olaniyi Adekunle | Nigeria | 10.1 | |
| | 4 | Cipriani Phillip | Trinidad and Tobago | DNS | |

=== Semifinals ===
Qualification: First 4 in each heat (Q) qualify directly for the final.

Wind:

- Heat 1: +0.3 m/s
- Heat 2: 0.0m/s

Semifinal heats results
| Rank | Heat | Name | Nationality | Time | Notes |
|---|---|---|---|---|---|
| 1 | 1 | Harry Jerome | Canada | 9.4 | Q |
| 2 | 1 | Tom Robinson | Bahamas | 9.5 | Q |
| 3 | 1 | David Ejoke | Nigeria | 9.5 | Q |
| 4 | 1 | Barrie Kelly | England | 9.6 | Q |
| 5 | 1 | Lynn Headley | Jamaica | 9.6 | |
| 6 | 1 | Bonner Mends | Ghana | 9.7 | |
| 7 | 1 | Gary Holdsworth | Australia | 9.81 | |
| 8 | 1 | Lennox Miller | Jamaica | 10.7 | |
| 1 | 2 | Stanley Allotey | Ghana | 9.5 | Q |
| 2 | 2 | Edwin Roberts | Trinidad and Tobago | 9.5 | Q |
| 3 | 2 | Gary Eddy | Australia | 9.61 | Q |
| 4 | 2 | Ebenezer Addy | Ghana | 9.6 | Q |
| 5 | 2 | Lynn Davies | Wales | 9.7 | |
| 6 | 2 | Eric Collins | Jamaica | 9.7 | |
| 7 | 2 | Sydney Asiodu | Nigeria | 9.7 | |
| 8 | 2 | John Owiti | Kenya | 9.8 | |

=== Final ===
Wind: -0.8 m/s

Final results: GR means games record
| Rank | Name | Nationality | Time | Notes |
|---|---|---|---|---|
| 1st place, gold medalist(s) | Harry Jerome | Canada | 9.41 | GR |
| 2nd place, silver medalist(s) | Tom Robinson | Bahamas | 9.44 | |
| 3rd place, bronze medalist(s) | Edwin Roberts | Trinidad and Tobago | 9.52 | |
| 4 | David Ejoke | Nigeria | 9.52 | |
| 5 | Gary Eddy | Australia | 9.52 | |
| 6 | Stanley Allotey | Ghana | 9.53 | |
| 7 | Barrie Kelly | England | 9.6 | |
| 8 | Ebenezer Addy | Ghana | 9.7 | |
