= Athletics at the 1967 Pan American Games – Men's 200 metres =

Men's 200 metres at the Pan American Games

The men's 200 metres event at the 1967 Pan American Games was held in Winnipeg on 1 and 2 August.

== Medalists ==
Gold	Silver	Bronze
John Carlos; United States	Jerry Bright; United States	Pablo Montes; Cuba

== Results ==
=== Heats ===
Held on 1 August

Wind:
Heat 1: +5.6 m/s, Heat 2: +3.9 m/s, Heat 3: +5.1 m/s, Heat 4: +5.9 m/s

Rank	Heat	Name	Nationality	Time	Notes
1	1	John Carlos	United States	20.81	Q
2	1	Pablo Montes	Cuba	21.10	Q
3	2	Michael Fray	Jamaica	21.14	Q
4	1	Iván Moreno	Chile	21.17	Q
5	3	Jerry Bright	United States	21.25	Q
6	2	Don Domansky	Canada	21.27	Q
7	4	Pedro Grajales	Colombia	21.40	Q
8	2	Fernando Acevedo	Peru	21.41	Q
9	4	Bernard Nottage	Bahamas	21.49	Q
10	4	Andrés Calonge	Argentina	21.49	Q
11	4	Harry Jerome	Canada	21.53	Q
12	3	Miguel Ángel González	Mexico	21.55	Q
13	3	Jaime Uribe	Colombia	21.69	Q
14	3	George Collie	Bahamas	21.70	Q
15	3	Enrique Montalvo	Puerto Rico	21.78	
16	2	George Simon	Trinidad and Tobago	21.85	Q
17	4	Miguel Villacrés	Ecuador	22.05	
18	2	Juan Franceschi	Puerto Rico	22.36	
	1	Winston Short	Trinidad and Tobago	DNS	
	1	Carl Plaskett	Virgin Islands	DNS	
	1	Alfredo Deza	Peru	DNS	
	2	Enrique Figuerola	Cuba	DNS	
	3	Jacobo Bucaram	Ecuador	DNS	
	3	Pablo McNeil	Jamaica	DNS	
	4	Lionel Urgan	Virgin Islands	DNS	

=== Semifinals ===
Held on 1 August

Wind:
Heat 1: +4.2 m/s, Heat 2: +4.0 m/s

Rank	Heat	Name	Nationality	Time	Notes
1	1	John Carlos	United States	20.52	Q
2	2	Jerry Bright	United States	20.76	Q
3	1	Pedro Grajales	Colombia	20.90	Q
3	1	Pablo Montes	Cuba	20.90	Q
5	2	Michael Fray	Jamaica	20.92	Q
6	1	Don Domansky	Canada	20.99	Q
7	2	Harry Jerome	Canada	21.01	Q
8	1	Iván Moreno	Chile	21.13	
9	2	Bernard Nottage	Bahamas	21.13	Q
10	1	Fernando Acevedo	Peru	21.17	
11	2	Andrés Calonge	Argentina	21.27	
12	2	Miguel Ángel González	Mexico	21.32	
13	2	Jaime Uribe	Colombia	21.41	
14	1	George Simon	Trinidad and Tobago	21.71	
15	1	George Collie	Bahamas	22.14	

=== Final ===
Held on 2 August

Rank	Name	Nationality	Time	Notes
1st place, gold medalist(s)	John Carlos	United States	20.5	
2nd place, silver medalist(s)	Jerry Bright	United States	20.9	
3rd place, bronze medalist(s)	Pablo Montes	Cuba	21.0	
4	Pedro Grajales	Colombia	21.3	
5	Michael Fray	Jamaica	21.4	
6	Bernard Nottage	Bahamas	21.9	
7	Harry Jerome	Canada	31.1	
	Don Domansky	Canada	DNS	
