= Athletics at the 1975 Pan American Games – Men's 4 × 400 metres relay =

Men's 4 × 400 metres relay at the Pan American Games

The men's 4 × 400 metres relay event at the 1975 Pan American Games was held in Mexico City on 20 October.

== Results ==
Rank	Nation	Athletes	Time	Notes
1st place, gold medalist(s)	United States	Herman Frazier, Robert Taylor, Maurice Peoples, Ronnie Ray	3:00.76	
2nd place, silver medalist(s)	Cuba	Eddy Gutiérrez, Carlos Álvarez, Dámaso Alfonso, Alberto Juantorena	3:02.82	
3rd place, bronze medalist(s)	Canada	Glenn Bogue, Randy Jackson, Brian Saunders, Don Domansky	3:03.92	
4	Jamaica	Kim Rowe, Noel Gray, Anthony Davis, Alfred Daley	3:05.23	
5	Puerto Rico	Félix Ríos, José Santiago Quiñones, Juan Franceschi, Iván Mangual	3:12.41	
6	Mexico	Enrique de la Mora, Francisco Andrade, Enrique Aguirre, Miguel López	3:12.87	
