= Athletics at the 1967 Pan American Games – Men's 100 metres =

Men's 100 metres at the Pan American Games

The men's 100 metres event at the 1967 Pan American Games was held in Winnipeg on 29 and 30 July.

== Medalists ==
Gold	Silver	Bronze
Harry Jerome; Canada	Willie Turner; United States	Hermes Ramírez; Cuba

== Results ==
=== Heats ===
Held on 29 July

Wind:
Heat 1: +1.0 m/s, Heat 2: +1.0 m/s, Heat 3: +1.6 m/s, Heat 4: +1.4 m/s

Rank	Heat	Name	Nationality	Time	Notes
1	1	Michael Fray	Jamaica	10.47	Q
1	3	Harry Jerome	Canada	10.47	Q
3	3	Hermes Ramírez	Cuba	10.55	Q
4	1	Winston Short	Trinidad and Tobago	10.59	Q
5	1	Fernando Acevedo	Peru	10.62	Q
5	2	Willie Turner	United States	10.62	Q
7	4	Jerry Bright	United States	10.65	Q
8	2	Tom Robinson	Bahamas	10.73	Q
8	3	Jorge Vizcarrondo	Puerto Rico	10.73	Q
10	3	Bernard Nottage	Bahamas	10.75	Q
11	4	Iván Moreno	Chile	10.76	Q
12	3	Hernando Arrechea	Colombia	10.78	
13	1	Lionel Urgan	Virgin Islands	10.83	Q
13	2	Pablo McNeil	Jamaica	10.83	Q
13	2	Ronald Monsegue	Trinidad and Tobago	10.83	Q
16	4	Carl Plaskett	Virgin Islands	10.85	Q
17	1	Jacobo Bucaram	Ecuador	10.87	
18	2	Jaime Uribe	Colombia	10.89	
19	4	Miguel Ángel González	Mexico	10.89	Q
20	2	Edmund Hearne	Canada	10.96	
21	4	Enrique Montalvo	Puerto Rico	10.96	
22	3	Juan Hasegawa	Peru	11.04	
	1	Enrique Figuerola	Cuba	DNF	
	4	Manuel Planchart	Venezuela	DNS	

=== Semifinals ===
Held on 29 July

Wind:
Heat 1: +0.9 m/s, Heat 2: +1.6 m/s

Rank	Heat	Name	Nationality	Time	Notes
1	2	Harry Jerome	Canada	10.25	Q
2	1	Willie Turner	United States	10.36	Q
3	2	Jerry Bright	United States	10.35	Q
4	1	Hermes Ramírez	Cuba	10.44	Q
4	1	Michael Fray	Jamaica	10.44	Q
4	2	Ronald Monsegue	Trinidad and Tobago	10.44	Q
7	1	Iván Moreno	Chile	10.49	Q
8	1	Bernard Nottage	Bahamas	10.53	
9	2	Pablo McNeil	Jamaica	10.55	Q
10	2	Jorge Vizcarrondo	Puerto Rico	10.56	
11	1	Fernando Acevedo	Peru	10.59	
12	1	Miguel Ángel González	Mexico	10.69	
13	2	Tom Robinson	Bahamas	10.70	
14	1	Carl Plaskett	Virgin Islands	10.71	
15	2	Lionel Urgan	Virgin Islands	10.75	
16	2	Winston Short	Trinidad and Tobago	11.28	

=== Final ===
Held on 30 July

Wind: +3.1 m/s

Rank	Lane	Name	Nationality	Time	Notes
1st place, gold medalist(s)	4	Harry Jerome	Canada	10.27	
2nd place, silver medalist(s)	8	Willie Turner	United States	10.27	
3rd place, bronze medalist(s)	6	Hermes Ramírez	Cuba	10.36	
4	3	Jerry Bright	United States	10.40	
5	2	Michael Fray	Jamaica	10.48	
6	1	Iván Moreno	Chile	10.58	
7	7	Ronald Monsegue	Trinidad and Tobago	10.82	
	5	Pablo McNeil	Jamaica	DNS	
