= Bernard Nottage =

Bahamian sprinter and politician

Personal information
- Nationality: Bahamian
- Born: 23 October 1945 Nassau, Bahamas
- Died: 28 June 2017 (aged 71) Florida, United States

Sport
- Sport: Sprinting
- Event: 100 metres

Bernard J. Nottage, MD (23 October 1945 – 28 June 2017) was a Bahamian sprinter, gynecologist and politician. He competed in the men's 100 metres and 200 metres at the 1968 Summer Olympics. He finished sixth in the 1967 Pan American Games 200 metres.

Dr. Nottage attended the University of Aberdeen. His brother, Kendal, as youth and sports minister, was instrumental in bringing Muhammad Ali to the Bahamas for his controversial last fight in December 1981.

== Biography ==
Nottage was born in Nassau, Bahamas, on 23 October 1945. He attended the University of Aberdeen in Scotland, studying medicine. Whilst at Aberdeen, he won athletics titles in the 100 yards and 200 yards in three consecutive years in the late 1960s. He also competed internationally for Scotland during the same time.

At the 1967 Pan American Games in Winnipeg, Nottage finished in sixth place in the men's 200 metres. The following year, at the 1968 Summer Olympics in Mexico City, Nottage competed in three events. He competed in the men's 100 metres, the men's 200 metres, and the men's 4 × 100 metres relay, but did not advance from the heats in any of the events. In the relay event, the team set a new national record that lasted for 25 years.

In 1976, Nottage became the President of the Bahamas Amateur Athletic Association, and became the President of the Central American and Caribbean Athletic Confederation six year later. In 1988, he was elected to a vice-presidential regional role of the International Amateur Athletic Federation (IAAF).

Nottage returned to the Bahamas and had a career in obstetrics and gynecology. In 1986, he went on to become the medical director at St. Luke's Medical Center in Nassau.

In 1987, Nottage became an MP with the Progressive Liberal Party. His political career continued, and he served as the Minister of Health, the Minister of Education (1990–1992), the Minister of Consumer Affairs (1989–1990), and the Minister of National Security. He was appointed Leader of the Opposition from 1993 to 1997. Nottage was MP for Bain Town and Grants Town from 2012 to 2017. He was appointed as Minister of National Security from 2012 to 2017. In 2000, he resigned from the Progressive Liberal Party to become the leader of the Coalition for Democratic Reform party.

He died in June 2017 in Florida, at the age of 71, with his body lying in state at the House of Assembly.

== International competitions ==
Year	Competition	Venue	Position	Event	Notes
Representing Bahamas
1962	Central American and Caribbean Games	Kingston, Jamaica	6th (h)	4 × 100 m relay	41.6
1966	British Empire and Commonwealth Games	Kingston, Jamaica	16th (qf)	100 y	10.0
1966	British Empire and Commonwealth Games	Kingston, Jamaica	16th (qf)	220 y	21.7
1966	British Empire and Commonwealth Games	Kingston, Jamaica	–	4 × 110 y relay	DQ
1967	Pan American Games	Winnipeg, Canada	8th (sf)	100 m	10.53
1967	Pan American Games	Winnipeg, Canada	6th	200 m	21.9
1968	Olympic Games	Mexico City, Mexico	47th (h)	100 m	10.64
1968	Olympic Games	Mexico City, Mexico	33rd (qf)	200 m	21.53
1968	Olympic Games	Mexico City, Mexico	–	4 × 100 m relay	DQ
1970	British Commonwealth Games	Edinburgh, United Kingdom	44th (h)	100 m	10.79
1970	British Commonwealth Games	Edinburgh, United Kingdom	33rd (h)	200 m	21.9
1970	British Commonwealth Games	Edinburgh, United Kingdom	– (h)	4 × 100 m relay	DNF

^{1}Did not start in the semifinals
