= Athletics at the 1971 Pan American Games – Men's 110 metres hurdles =

Men's 110 metres hurdles at the Pan American Games

The men's 110 metres hurdles event at the 1971 Pan American Games was held in Cali on 4 and 5 August.

== Medalists ==
Gold	Silver	Bronze
Rod Milburn; United States	Arnaldo Bristol; Puerto Rico	Juan Morales; Cuba

== Results ==
=== Heats ===
Wind:
Heat 1: +2.0 m/s, Heat 2: +1.9 m/s

Rank	Heat	Name	Nationality	Time	Notes
1	2	Juan Morales	Cuba	13.69	Q
2	1	Rod Milburn	United States	13.72	Q
3	1	Godfrey Murray	Jamaica	13.90	Q
4	1	Arnaldo Bristol	Puerto Rico	14.09	Q
5	2	Ron Draper	United States	14.17	Q
6	1	Alejandro Casañas	Cuba	14.19	Q
7	2	Tony Nelson	Canada	14.31	Q
8	1	Brian Donnelly	Canada	14.52	
9	2	Enrique Rendón	Venezuela	14.62	Q
10	2	José Barbante	Brazil	15.35	
11	1	Oscar Marín	Venezuela	15.44	
12	1	Marcio Lomonaco	Brazil	17.16	

=== Final ===
Wind: +4.5 m/s

Rank	Name	Nationality	Time	Notes
1st place, gold medalist(s)	Rod Milburn	United States	13.46	
2nd place, silver medalist(s)	Arnaldo Bristol	Puerto Rico	13.81	
3rd place, bronze medalist(s)	Juan Morales	Cuba	13.85	
4	Godfrey Murray	Jamaica	13.99	
5	Alejandro Casañas	Cuba	14.17	
6	Tony Nelson	Canada	14.49	
7	Enrique Rendón	Venezuela	14.61	
	Ron Draper	United States	DQ	
