= Athletics at the 1975 Pan American Games – Men's 400 metres =

Men's 400 metres at the Pan American Games

The men's 400 metres event at the 1975 Pan American Games was held in Mexico City on 17 and 18 October.

== Medalists ==
Gold	Silver	Bronze
Ronnie Ray; United States	Alberto Juantorena; Cuba	Delmo da Silva; Brazil

== Results ==
=== Heats ===
Rank	Heat	Name	Nationality	Time	Notes
1	3	Alberto Juantorena	Cuba	47.19	Q
2	3	Alfred Daley	Jamaica	47.51	Q
3	1	Delmo da Silva	Brazil	47.81	Q
4	3	Mike Sands	Bahamas	47.81	Q
5	3	Juan Franceschi	Puerto Rico	47.82	Q
6	2	Miguel López	Mexico	47.87	Q
7	3	Hugo Tanino	Argentina	48.06	Q
8	2	Trevor Campbell	Jamaica	48.31	Q
9	3	Aubrey Wilson	Guyana	48.34	Q
10	2	Brian Saunders	Canada	48.64	Q
11	1	Félix Ríos	Puerto Rico	48.76	Q
12	1	Ronnie Ray	United States	49.09	Q
13	1	Glenn Bogue	Canada	49.10	Q
14	1	Eddy Gutiérrez	Cuba	49.62	Q
15	3	Wilfrid Cyriaque	Haiti	51.82	
	2	Maurice Peoples	United States	DNS	

=== Semifinals ===
Rank	Heat	Name	Nationality	Time	Notes
1	2	Alberto Juantorena	Cuba	45.46	Q
2	1	Ronnie Ray	United States	46.05	Q
3	1	Eddy Gutiérrez	Cuba	46.24	Q
4	1	Mike Sands	Bahamas	46.28	Q
5	1	Glenn Bogue	Canada	46.52	Q
6	2	Delmo da Silva	Brazil	46.55	Q
7	1	Alfred Daley	Jamaica	46.56	
8	2	Trevor Campbell	Jamaica	46.93	Q
9	2	Brian Saunders	Canada	47.46	Q
10	2	Félix Ríos	Puerto Rico	47.80	
11	2	Miguel López	Mexico	47.83	
12	2	Aubrey Wilson	Guyana	48.45	
13	1	Juan Franceschi	Puerto Rico	53.46	
	1	Hugo Tanino	Argentina	DNS	

=== Final ===
Rank	Name	Nationality	Time	Notes
1st place, gold medalist(s)	Ronnie Ray	United States	44.45	GR
2nd place, silver medalist(s)	Alberto Juantorena	Cuba	44.80	
3rd place, bronze medalist(s)	Delmo da Silva	Brazil	45.53	
4	Mike Sands	Bahamas	45.89	
5	Eddy Gutiérrez	Cuba	46.15	
6	Brian Saunders	Canada	46.30	
7	Trevor Campbell	Jamaica	46.61	
8	Glenn Bogue	Canada	47.29	
