= Athletics at the 1967 Pan American Games – Men's 4 × 100 metres relay =

Men's 4 × 100 metres relay at the Pan American Games

The men's 4 × 100 metres relay event at the 1967 Pan American Games was held in Winnipeg on 4 and 5 August.

== Medallists ==
Gold	Silver	Bronze
United States; Earl McCullouch; Jerry Bright; Ron Copeland; Willie Turner	Cuba; Félix Eugellés; Juan Morales; Hermes Ramírez; Pablo Montes	Colombia; Jaime Uribe; Hernando Arrechea; Carlos Álvarez; Pedro Grajales

== Results ==
=== Heats ===
Rank	Heat	Nation	Athletes	Time	Notes
1	1	United States	Earl McCullouch, Jerry Bright, Ron Copeland, Willie Turner	39.17	Q
2	2	Cuba	Félix Eugellés, Juan Morales, Hermes Ramírez, Pablo Montes	39.64	Q
3	2	Trinidad and Tobago	Winston Short, Wilton Jackson, Ronald Monsegue, Raymond Fabien	40.48	Q
4	1	Colombia	Jaime Uribe, Hernando Arrechea, Carlos Álvarez, Pedro Grajales	40.57	Q
5	1	Puerto Rico	Juan Franceschi, Héctor González, Enrique Montalvo, Jorge Vizcarrondo	40.66	Q
6	1	Jamaica	Wellesley Clayton, Clifton Forbes, Pablo McNeil, Michael Fray	41.09	Q
7	2	Peru	Juan Hasegawa, Alfredo Deza, Jorge Alemán, Fernando Acevedo	41.39	Q
8	2	Canada	Frank Marlatt, Terry Tomlinson, Ian Arnold, Edmund Hearne	41.49	Q
	2	Bahamas		DNS	

=== Final ===
Rank	Nation	Athletes	Time	Notes
1st place, gold medalist(s)	United States	Earl McCullouch, Jerry Bright, Ron Copeland, Willie Turner	39.05	
2nd place, silver medalist(s)	Cuba	Félix Eugellés, Juan Morales, Hermes Ramírez, Pablo Montes	39.26	
3rd place, bronze medalist(s)	Colombia	Jaime Uribe, Hernando Arrechea, Carlos Álvarez, Pedro Grajales	39.92	
4	Trinidad and Tobago	Winston Short, Wilton Jackson, Ronald Monsegue, Raymond Fabien	40.16	
5	Jamaica	Wellesley Clayton, Clifton Forbes, Pablo McNeil, Michael Fray	40.23	
6	Puerto Rico	Juan Franceschi, Héctor González, Enrique Montalvo, Jorge Vizcarrondo	40.70	
7	Canada	Frank Marlatt, Terry Tomlinson, Ian Arnold, Edmund Hearne	40.71	
8	Peru	Juan Hasegawa, Alfredo Deza, Jorge Alemán, Fernando Acevedo	41.00	
