= George Collie =

Bahamian sprinter

Personal information
- Full name: George Reginald Collie
- Nationality: Bahamian
- Born: 21 April 1941 (age 85) Nassau, Bahamas
- Height: 1.73 m (5 ft 8 in)
- Weight: 70 kg (154 lb)

Sport
- Sport: Sprinting
- Event: 100 metres

George Reginald Collie (born 21 April 1941) is a Bahamian sprinter. He competed in the men's 100 metres and men's 200 metres at the 1964 Summer Olympics.

== International competitions ==
Year	Competition	Venue	Position	Event	Notes
Representing Bahamas
1962	Central American and Caribbean Games	Kingston, Jamaica	9th (sf)	100 m	10.7
1962	Central American and Caribbean Games	Kingston, Jamaica	11th (sf)	200 m	22.3
1962	Central American and Caribbean Games	Kingston, Jamaica	6th (h)	4 × 100 m relay	41.6
1964	British West Indies Championships	Kingston, Jamaica	1st	200 m	21.5
1964	Olympic Games	Tokyo, Japan	51st (h)	100 m	10.9
1964	Olympic Games	Tokyo, Japan	40th (h)	200 m	21.9
1966	Central American and Caribbean Games	San Juan, Puerto Rico	6th (h)	100 m	10.6^{1}
1966	Central American and Caribbean Games	San Juan, Puerto Rico	6th	200 m	22.0
1966	British Empire and Commonwealth Games	Kingston, Jamaica	15th (qf)	100 y	9.9
1966	British Empire and Commonwealth Games	Kingston, Jamaica	18th (qf)	220 y	21.8
1966	British Empire and Commonwealth Games	Kingston, Jamaica	–	4 × 110 y relay	DQ
1967	Pan American Games	Winnipeg, Canada	15th (sf)	200 m	22.14

^{1}Did not start in the semifinals

== Personal bests ==
- 100 metres – 10.63 (1966)
- 200 metres – 21.0h (1964)
