= Tommy Robinson (sprinter) =

Bahamian sprinter (1937–2012)

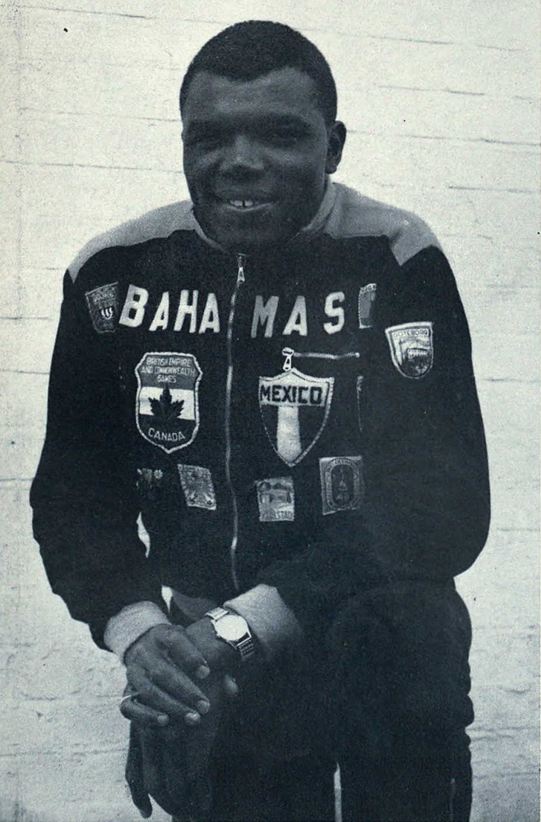
- Robinson in 1960

Personal information
- Born: Thomas Augustus Robinson; 18 March 1937 Nassau, Bahamas
- Died: 25 November 2012 (aged 75) Nassau, The Bahamas
- Education: University of Michigan
- Height: 180 cm (5 ft 11 in)
- Weight: 82 kg (181 lb)

Sport
- Country: The Bahamas
- Sport: Track and field
- Event: Sprinting
Medal record
British Empire and Commonwealth Games
Representing Bahamas
Gold medal – first place	1958 Cardiff	220 yards
Silver medal – second place	1958 Cardiff	100 yards
Silver medal – second place	1962 Perth	100 yards
Silver medal – second place	1966 Kingston	100 yards
Central American and Caribbean Games
Gold medal – first place	1962 Kingston	100 metres

Thomas Augustus "Tommy" "Tom" "Gus" Robinson, MBE, (18 March 1937 – 25 November 2012) was a track and field athlete from the Bahamas, who competed in the sprint events. Robinson represented his country at four Olympics from 1956-1968. He won gold in the 200 yards and silver in the 100 yards at the 1958 British Empire and Commonwealth Games. He also won silver in the 100 yards in the 1962 British Empire and Commonwealth Games and the 1966 British Empire and Commonwealth Games. He claimed a gold medal at the 1962 Central American and Caribbean Games. He was inducted into the University of Michigan Athletic Hall of Honor in 1985. He was inducted into the national hall of fame in 1989. The Thomas A Robinson Track and Field Stadium, built in 1981 in is named in his honour.

== Early life and education ==
Robinson was the born in Nassau, Bahamas. He was the son of Cyril and Willasy Robinson of Hawkins Hill. He attended St John's College, graduating in 1953.

He then attended the University of Michigan where he competed for Wolverines. Robinson ran for the University of Michigan track team from 1958 to 1961, winning multiple team and individual Big Ten Conference championships during his tenure.

== Career ==
Robinson represented his country in four consecutive Summer Olympics, starting in 1956, where as an 18-year-old, he competed in the 100 metres and 200 metres but did not advance beyond the first round in either event.

Four years later in Rome at the 1960 Summer Olympics, Robinson reached the semi-finals in both the 100 metres and the 200 metres. He reached the 100 metres final at the 1964 Summer Olympics and finished in eighth place.

At the 1968 Summer Olympics, Robinson was part of the team that reached the semi-finals of the 4×100 m relay. The team set a national record of 39.45 s in the early rounds. The team were disqualified, however, before reaching the finals.

At the 1958 British Empire and Commonwealth Games in Cardiff, he won gold in the 220 yards dash and silver in the 100-yards dash. He again won silver in the 100 yards in the 1962 British Empire and Commonwealth Games. He also won a gold medal at the 1962 Central American and Caribbean Games.

Robinson won the silver in the 1966 British Empire and Commonwealth Games, where he again finished second to long time rival, the Canadian Harry Jerome. Robinson also competed at the Pan American Games in Winnipeg in 1967.

== Honours and awards ==
In 1981, the Thomas A Robinson Track and Field Stadium, was named in his honour. He was inducted into the University of Michigan Athletic Hall of Honor in 1985 and his country's national sports hall of fame in 1989.

In 1993, Robinson was made a Member of the British Empire (MBE) in the Queen's Birthday Honours.

== Death ==
Robinson died on 25 November 2012 at the Princess Margaret Hospital after a battle with cancer. He was 74.

== International competitions ==
Year	Competition	Venue	Position	Event	Notes
Representing the Bahamas
1955	Pan American Games	Mexico City, Mexico	16th (sf)	100 m	11.26
1955	Pan American Games	Mexico City, Mexico	16th (sf)	200 m	22.74
1956	Olympic Games	Melbourne, Australia	47th (h)	100 m	11.30
1956	Olympic Games	Melbourne, Australia	8th (h)	200 m	21.76
1957	British West Indies Championships	Kingston, Jamaica	3rd	100 m	10.6
1958	British Empire and Commonwealth Games	Cardiff, United Kingdom	2nd	100 y	9.69
1958	British Empire and Commonwealth Games	Cardiff, United Kingdom	1st	220 y	21.08
1960	British West Indies Championships	Kingston, Jamaica	1st	100 m	10.4
1960	Olympic Games	Rome, Italy	9th (sf)	100 m	10.5
1960	Olympic Games	Rome, Italy	11th (sf)	200 m	21.5
1962	Central American and Caribbean Games	Kingston, Jamaica	1st	100 m	10.41
1962	British Empire and Commonwealth Games	Perth, Australia	2nd	100 y	9.63
1962	British Empire and Commonwealth Games	Perth, Australia	6th (sf)	220 y	21.5
1964	British West Indies Championships	Kingston, Jamaica	1st	100 m	10.3
1964	Olympic Games	Tokyo, Japan	8th	100 m	10.5
1966	British Empire and Commonwealth Games	Kingston, Jamaica	2nd	100 y	9.44
1966	British Empire and Commonwealth Games	Kingston, Jamaica	6th (h)	220 y	21.7^{1}
1966	British Empire and Commonwealth Games	Kingston, Jamaica	– (h)	4 × 110 y relay	DQ
1967	Pan American Games	Winnipeg, Canada	13th (sf)	100 m	10.70
1968	Olympic Games	Mexico City, Mexico	– (h)	100 m	DNF
1968	Olympic Games	Mexico City, Mexico	10th (h)	4 × 100 m relay	39.4^{2}
1970	British Commonwealth Games	Edinburgh, United Kingdom	– (h)	4 × 100 m relay	DNF

^{1}Did not start in the quarterfinals
^{2}Disqualified in the semifinals
