= Terry Davies (sprinter) =

Welsh athlete

Personal information
- Nationality: British (Welsh)
- Born: born c.1942 Wales

Sport
- Sport: Athletics
- Event: Sprints
- Club: Carmarthen Harriers

Terrence Davies (born c.1942) is a former track and field athlete from Wales, who competed at the 1966 British Empire and Commonwealth Games and the 1970 British Commonwealth Games (now Commonwealth Games).

== Biography ==
Davies was a member of Carmarthen Harriers and won the Welsh AAA title over 220 yards in 1966. Davies competed for Wales in the 220 yards at the Birmingham Games as a warm-up to the Commonwealth Games.

He represented the 1966 Welsh team at the 1966 British Empire and Commonwealth Games in Kingston, Jamaica, participating in three events; the 100 yards, the 220 yards and the 4 × 110 yards relay, with Keri Jones, Lynn Davies and Ron Jones.

In 1969, Davies a schoolteacher by profession and living in Slough, won the 200 metres at the Four Nations International.

He went to a second Commonwealth Games, representing the 1970 Welsh team at the 1970 British Commonwealth Games in Edinburgh, Scotland.
