= Alfredo Deza =

Alfredo Deza may refer to:

- Alfredo Deza (high jumper) (born 1979), Peruvian high jumper
- Alfredo Deza (hurdler) (born 1944), his father, Peruvian hurdler
