= Johnny Kilpatrick =

Northern Irish athlete

Personal information
- Nationality: British (Northern Irish)
- Born: 15 July 1945 Randalstown, County Antrim

Sport
- Sport: Athletics
- Event: Sprints / high jump
- Club: Queen's Univ AC; Ballymena AC

John Alexander Kilpatrick (born 15 July 1945) is a former athlete from Northern Ireland, who represented Northern Ireland at the British Empire and Commonwealth Games (now Commonwealth Games).

== Biography ==
Kilpatrick first came to prominence as a high jumper but soon established himself as a sprinter, recording 9.9 seconds for the 100 yards in July 1964. By 1966 the Queen's University Belfast sprinter was part of the Great British team at international level.

Kilpatrick represented the 1966 Northern Irish Team at the 1966 British Empire and Commonwealth Games in Kingston, Jamaica, participating in the two athletics events; the 100 yards and the 220 yards.

Kilpatrick was a four-times Northern Irish champion, winning the 100 yards title in 1966, 1967, 1968 and 1969.

Kilpatrick was also proficient at rugby union and played on the wing.
