= Michael Fray =

Jamaican sprinter (1947–2019)

Mike Fray
Personal information
- Born: 3 September 1947 Colony of Jamaica, British Empire
- Died: 6 November 2019 (aged 72) Kingston, Jamaica

Sport
- Sport: Track and field
Medal record
Men's athletics
Representing Jamaica
British Empire and Commonwealth Games
Silver medal – second place	1966 Kingston	4×110 yards relay

Michael Fray (3 September 1947 – 6 November 2019) was a Jamaican Olympic sprinter. In the 1968 Mexico Olympics, he ran second leg on the 4×100 meters Jamaican relay team (with Lennox Miller, Clifton Forbes, and schoolboy Errol Stewart) which set the world record at 38.6 seconds in the preliminary heats and then broke the record with a 38.3 seconds clocking in the semi-finals. This 38.3 clocking still stands as the world record for athletes under twenty-three years old.

Fray enjoyed success with the Jamaican relay team in other competitions, including a silver medal at the 1966 British Empire and Commonwealth Games (alongside Pablo McNeil) and a gold medal at the 1966 Central American and Caribbean Games. He returned to the latter competition in 1970 and was an individual bronze medallist in the 100 m. He won a bronze medal in the 4×400 metre relay at the 1967 Pan American Games.

Running from the tight confines of lane one, he placed seventh in the finals of the 1968 Olympic 200 meters won by Tommie Smith who is widely known for his gloved black power salute protest on the podium along with bronze medalist John Carlos. Both Smith and Carlos were banned for this protest.

In the 1972 Olympics in Munich, West Germany, Fray placed 5th. in the finals of the 100 meters which was won by Russian Valeriy Borzov.

He set a U.S. National Junior College 200 meters record in 1967 while competing for Odessa Junior College and was ranked number 10 in the world in the 200 meters in 1968 by Track & Field News magazine.

As a schoolboy, he placed fourth behind Miller in the 1965 100 yards finals and second behind Miller in the 1965 220 yards finals at the Jamaican High Schools Championships.

Fray died by suicide by hanging on 6 November 2019.

Fray is honored for his athleticism and record-breaking achievements.

== International competitions ==
Year	Competition	Venue	Position	Event	Notes
Representing Jamaica
1966	Central American and Caribbean Games	San Juan, Puerto Rico	1st	4 × 100 m relay	40.5
1966	British Empire and Commonwealth Games	Kingston, Jamaica	10th (sf)	220 y	21.3
1966	British Empire and Commonwealth Games	Kingston, Jamaica	2nd	4 × 110 y relay	40.0
1967	Pan American Games	Winnipeg, Canada	5th	100 m	10.48
1967	Pan American Games	Winnipeg, Canada	5th	200 m	21.4
1967	Pan American Games	Winnipeg, Canada	5th	4 × 100 m relay	40.23
1967	Pan American Games	Winnipeg, Canada	3rd	4 × 400 m relay	3:05.99
1968	Olympic Games	Mexico City, Mexico	7th	200 m	20.63
1968	Olympic Games	Mexico City, Mexico	4th	4 × 100 m relay	38.4
1970	Central American and Caribbean Games	Panama City, Panama	3rd	100 m	10.45
1970	Central American and Caribbean Games	Panama City, Panama	5th	200 m	21.7
1972	Olympic Games	Munich, West Germany	5th	100 m	10.40
1975	Central American and Caribbean Championships	Ponce, Puerto Rico	1st	4 × 100 m relay	40.6
1975	Pan American Games	Mexico City, Mexico	10th (sf)	100 m	10.39

== Personal bests ==
- 100 metres – 10.39 A (Mexico City 1975)
- 200 metres – 20.39 A (Mexico City 1968)
