= Keri Jones =

Welsh dual-code rugby international footballer (1945–2026)

Personal information
- Full name: William Keri Jones
- Born: 13 January 1945 Neath, Wales
- Died: 29 October 2026 (aged 81)

Playing information
- Height: 1.73 m (5 ft 8 in)
- Weight: 73 kg (11 st 7 lb)

Rugby union
- Position: Wing
Club
Years	Team	Pld	T	G	FG	P
	Cardiff C.o.E.
	Neath RFC
1965–68	Cardiff RFC	60	32	0
	Barbarian F.C.
	Total	60	32	0	0	0
Representative
Years	Team	Pld	T	G	FG	P
1967–68	Wales	5	2	0	0
1968	British Lions	0	0	0	0

Rugby league
- Position: Wing
Club
Years	Team	Pld	T	G	FG	P
1968–72	Wigan	57	38	0	0	114
Representative
Years	Team	Pld	T	G	FG	P
1970	Great Britain	2	0	0	0	0

William Keri Jones (13 January 1945 – 29 October 2026) was a Welsh dual-code international rugby union, and professional rugby league footballer who played in the 1960s and 1970s. He played representative level rugby union (RU) for Wales, and at club level for Cardiff RFC, as a Wing and representative level rugby league (RL) for Great Britain, and at club level for Wigan, as a wing. He was also an accomplished track and field athlete having represented Wales at the 1966 Jamaica Commonwealth Games.

== Background ==
Keri Jones was born in Neath, Wales, on 13 January 1945.

== Athletics ==
Jones was a member of the athletics team belonging to the City of Cardiff Training College. He competed for Wales in the 220 yards at the Birmingham Games as a warm-up event to the Commonwealth Games.

He represented the 1966 Welsh team at the 1966 British Empire and Commonwealth Games in Kingston, Jamaica, participating in three events; the 100 yards, the 220 yards and the 4 × 110 yards relay with Terry Davies, Lynn Davies and Ron Jones.

== Death ==
Jones died on 29 October 2026, aged 81.

== International honours (rugby union) ==
Jones won 5-caps for Wales (RU) while at Cardiff RFC. Jones was capped five times as a wing for Wales, winning all his caps in the 1967-68 season. He scored two tries for Wales. Jones was selected for the 1968 British Lions tour to South Africa but did not play in any of the internationals against South Africa. He did play in the match against Rhodesia, and in five other games against regional opposition, scoring a try in the win over South Western Districts.

== International honours (rugby league) ==
Jones won caps for Great Britain (RL) while at Wigan in the 1970 Rugby League World Cup against France, and New Zealand.
