= Jack Harman =

Jack Harman may refer to

- Jack Harman (British Army officer), British general
- Jack Harman (artist), Canadian artist
