= Juan "Papo" Franceschi =

Puerto Rican athlete

Juan "Papo" Franceschi Vega
- Born: 12 January 1947; Ponce, Puerto Rico
- Died: 20 October 1990; San Juan, Puerto Rico
- Occupation: Athlete

Juan "Papo" Franceschi (12 January 1947 – 20 October 1990), was a Puerto Rican track and field athlete from Ponce, Puerto Rico. At 1966 Central American and Caribbean Games, where he secured a gold medal in the 400-meter dash break a new tournament record of 46.7 seconds and a bronze medal in the 4 × 400-meter relay. Franceschi placed fourth at the 1967 Pan American Games in Winnipeg and represented Puerto Rico at the 1968 Summer Olympics in Mexico City. Following his tragic death in 1990, his legacy has been honored through numerous memorial sites, an annual 5K race in his hometown of Ponce, and posthumous inductions into both the Ponce Sports Hall of Fame and the Puerto Rican Sports Hall of Fame.

== Biography ==
Juan "Papo" Franceschi was born in Barrio San Anton, Ponce, Puerto Rico, on 12 January 1947. Franceschi Vega was known as "El Bolido de San Antón". He was a cousin of Otoniel Velez Franceschi, and a track and field runner in Puerto Rico, participating in the 1966 X Juegos CAC Games where he won a gold medal in the 400 meters with a time of 46.7, a new record in the Games. He also won Bronze in the long relay ("relevo largo"). In 1967 he won fourth place at the Panamerican Games in Winnipeg, Manitoba, Canada, with a score of 46.09. He also competed in the 1968 Olympic games in Mexico City. He was shot and killed on 20 October 1990 in San Juan, Puerto Rico and is buried at Camposanto Cristo Resucitado in Ponce. He was father to two sons and three daughters, Johnny Franceschi is one of his sons.

== Awards ==
In 2000, he was inducted in the Ponce Sports Hall of Fame. He is also recognized at Ponce's Parque de los Ponceños Ilustres in the area of sports. In 2001, Franceschi became the 101st inductee in the Pabellón de la Fama del Deporte de Puerto Rico (Puerto Rican Sports Hall of Fame).

== Legacy ==
- In Ponce's Barrio San Anton, there is street named after him.
- Starting in 1988, his birth city has celebrated a 5K Marathon in his memory.
- Franceschi is honored at the Park of Illustrious Ponce Citizens in Tricentennial Park in Ponce, Puerto Rico.

== International competitions ==
Year	Competition	Venue	Position	Event	Notes
Representing Puerto Rico
1966	Central American and Caribbean Games	San Juan, Puerto Rico	1st	400 m	46.77
1966	Central American and Caribbean Games	San Juan, Puerto Rico	3rd	4 × 400 m relay	3:10.3
1967	Pan American Games	Winnipeg, Canada	18th (h)	200 m	22.36
1967	Pan American Games	Winnipeg, Canada	4th	400 m	46.32
1967	Pan American Games	Winnipeg, Canada	6th	4 × 100 m relay	40.70
1967	Central American and Caribbean Championships	Xalapa, Mexico	2nd	100 m	10.6
1967	Central American and Caribbean Championships	Xalapa, Mexico	2nd	200 m	21.6
1967	Central American and Caribbean Championships	Xalapa, Mexico	1st	400 m	47.1
1968	Olympic Games	Mexico City, Mexico	–	200 m	DNF
1969	Central American and Caribbean Championships	Havana, Cuba	1st	400 m	47.0
1975	Pan American Games	Mexico City, Mexico	13th (sf)	400 m	53.46
1975	Pan American Games	Mexico City, Mexico	8th	4 × 100 m relay	39.80
1975	Pan American Games	Mexico City, Mexico	5th	4 × 400 m relay	3:12.41

== See also ==
- List of Puerto Ricans
- Black history in Puerto Rico
