= Juan Morales (hurdler) =

Cuban hurdler and sprinter

Personal information
- Full name: Juan Morales Hechavarría
- Born: 12 July 1948 (age 78) Santiago de Cuba, Cuba
- Height: 1.81 m (5 ft 11 in)
- Weight: 73 kg (161 lb)
Medal record
Men's athletics
Representing Cuba
Olympic Games
Silver medal – second place	1968 Mexico City	4×100m relay
Pan American Games
Silver medal – second place	1967 Winnipeg	4×100m relay
Silver medal – second place	1971 Cali	4×100m relay
Bronze medal – third place	1967 Winnipeg	110m hurdles
Bronze medal – third place	1971 Cali	110m hurdles
Central American and Caribbean Games
Gold medal – first place	1970 Panama City	110m hurdles
Gold medal – first place	1970 Panama City	4x100m relay
Bronze medal – third place	1966 San Juan	110m hurdles
Bronze medal – third place	1966 San Juan	4x100m relay
Summer Universiade
Silver medal – second place	1970 Turin	4x100m relay

Juan Morales Hechavarría (Note: In this Spanish name, the first or paternal surname is Morales and the second or maternal family name is Hechavarría.) (born 12 July 1948) is a former Cuban athlete who competed mainly in 110 metres hurdles. Together with Hermes Ramírez, Pablo Montes, and Enrique Figuerola he won an Olympic silver medal in 4 x 100 metres relay in Mexico City 1968. He was a prominent athlete in the American and Caribbean scene, winning the Central American and Caribbean Championships four times in a row. He was not able to compete for his fifth title as the 1975 event was cancelled due to torrential rain. Alejandro Casañas would eventually take over his role as the leading Cuban hurdler.

== International competitions ==
Year	Competition	Venue	Position	Event	Notes
Representing Cuba
1966	Central American and Caribbean Games	San Juan, Puerto Rico	3rd	110 m hurdles	14.5 (w)
1966	Central American and Caribbean Games	San Juan, Puerto Rico	3rd	4 × 100 m relay	40.6
1967	Pan American Games	Winnipeg, Canada	3rd	110 m hurdles	14.30
1967	Pan American Games	Winnipeg, Canada	2nd	4 × 100 m relay	39.26
1967	Central American and Caribbean Championships	Xalapa, Mexico	1st	110 m hurdles	14.6
1967	Central American and Caribbean Championships	Xalapa, Mexico	1st	4 × 100 m relay	40.3
1968	Olympic Games	Mexico City, Mexico	13th (sf)	110 m hurdles	14.08
1968	Olympic Games	Mexico City, Mexico	2nd	4 × 100 m relay	38.40
1969	Central American and Caribbean Championships	Havana, Cuba	1st	110 m hurdles	14.4
1969	Central American and Caribbean Championships	Havana, Cuba	–	4 × 100 m relay	DNF
1970	Central American and Caribbean Games	Panama City, Panama	1st	110 m hurdles	14.0
1970	Central American and Caribbean Games	Panama City, Panama	1st	4 × 100 m relay	39.4
1970	Universiade	Turin, Italy	4th	110 m hurdles	14.0
1970	Universiade	Turin, Italy	2nd	4 × 100 m relay	39.2
1971	Central American and Caribbean Championships	Kingston, Jamaica	1st	110 m hurdles	13.8
1971	Pan American Games	Cali, Colombia	3rd	110 m hurdles	13.85
1971	Pan American Games	Cali, Colombia	2nd	4 × 100 m relay	39.84
1972	Olympic Games	Munich, West Germany	7th (sf)	4 × 100 m relay	39.04
1973	Central American and Caribbean Championships	Maracaibo, Venezuela	1st	110 m hurdles	13.7
1973	Central American and Caribbean Championships	Maracaibo, Venezuela	2nd	4 × 100 m relay	40.2
1977	Central American and Caribbean Championships	Xalapa, Mexico	1st	4 × 100 m relay	39.86

== Personal bests ==
- 100 metres – 10.2h (NWI, Waltrop 1969)
- 200 metres – 21.0h (+0.4 m/s, Zürich 1969)
- 110 metres hurdles – 13.70 (+1.9 m/s, Cali 1971)
