= Eddy Gutiérrez =

Cuban sprinter

Personal information
- Full name: Eduardo Gutiérrez James
- Born: 28 February 1952 (age 74) Velasco, Ciego de Ávila Province, Cuba
- Height: 1.87 m (6 ft 2 in)
- Weight: 78 kg (172 lb)

Sport
- Sport: Sprinting
- Event: 400 metres

Eduardo "Eddy" Gutiérrez James (Spanish pronunciation: [ˈeði ɣuˈtjeres]; born 28 February 1952) is a Cuban former sprinter who competed in the 1976 Summer Olympics.

== International competitions ==
Year	Competition	Venue	Position	Event	Notes
Representing Cuba
1973	Central American and Caribbean Championships	Maracaibo, Venezuela	6th	400 m	47.6
1973	Central American and Caribbean Championships	Maracaibo, Venezuela	2nd	4 × 400 m relay	3:10.1
1974	Central American and Caribbean Games	Santo Domingo, Dominican Republic	4th	400 m	46.75
1974	Central American and Caribbean Games	Santo Domingo, Dominican Republic	1st	4 × 400 m relay	3:06.36
1975	Pan American Games	Mexico City, Mexico	5th	400 m	46.15
1975	Pan American Games	Mexico City, Mexico	2nd	4 × 400 m relay	3:02.82
1976	Olympic Games	Montreal, Canada	20th (qf)	400 m	46.65
1976	Olympic Games	Montreal, Canada	7th	4 × 400 m relay	3:03.81

== Personal bests ==
- 400 metres – 45.3 (1976)
