= Athletics at the 1967 Pan American Games – Men's 110 metres hurdles =

Men's 110 metres hurdles at the Pan American Games

The men's 110 metres hurdles event at the 1967 Pan American Games was held in Winnipeg, Manitoba on 2 and 4 August.

== Medalists ==
Gold	Silver	Bronze
Earl McCullouch; United States	Willie Davenport; United States	Juan Morales; Cuba

== Results ==
=== Heats ===
Wind:
Heat 1: ? m/s, Heat 2: +3.0 m/s

Rank	Heat	Name	Nationality	Time	Notes
1	2	Earl McCullouch	United States	13.51	Q
2	1	Willie Davenport	United States	13.66	Q
3	1	Juan Morales	Cuba	14.06	Q
4	1	Hernando Arrechea	Colombia	14.40	Q
5	2	Ray Harvey	Jamaica	14.56	Q
6	1	Brian Donnelly	Canada	14.71	Q
7	2	Alfredo Deza	Peru	14.76	Q
8	2	Jacobo Bucaram	Ecuador	15.50	Q
9	2	George Neeland	Canada	17.84	
	1	Roberto Abugattás	Peru	DNS	

=== Final ===
Wind: +1.3 m/s

Rank	Name	Nationality	Time	Notes
1st place, gold medalist(s)	Earl McCullouch	United States	13.49	
2nd place, silver medalist(s)	Willie Davenport	United States	13.55	
3rd place, bronze medalist(s)	Juan Morales	Cuba	14.30	
4	Ray Harvey	Jamaica	14.51	
5	Hernando Arrechea	Colombia	14.76	
6	Brian Donnelly	Canada	14.82	
7	Alfredo Deza	Peru	15.01	
8	Jacobo Bucaram	Ecuador	15.77	
