= Hernando Arrechea =

Colombian hurdler (1943–2009)

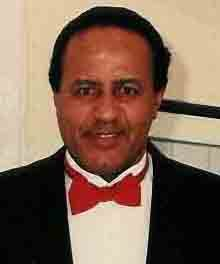

Personal information
- Born: 12 December 1943 Puerto Tejada, Cauca, Colombia
- Died: 22 June 2009 (aged 65) Springfield, Massachusetts, United States

Sport
- Country: Colombia
- Sport: Running

Achievements and titles
- Olympic finals: 1968 Summer Olympics
Medal record
Men's Athletics
Representing Colombia
Bolivarian Games
Gold medal – first place	1965 Quito	110 m hurdles
Central American and Caribbean Games
Gold medal – first place	1966 San Juan	110 m hurdles
Pan American Games
Bronze medal – third place	1967 Winnipeg	4 x 100 m relay

Hernando Arrechea Serrano (12 December 1943 – 22 June 2009) was a Colombian hurdler who competed in the 1967 Pan Am Games and the 1968 Summer Olympics.

== International competitions ==
Year	Competition	Venue	Position	Event	Notes
Representing Colombia
1963	South American Championships	Cali, Colombia	9th (h)	110 m hurdles	15.7
1965	South American Championships	Rio de Janeiro, Brazil	3rd	110 m hurdles	15.7
1965	Bolivarian Games	Quito, Ecuador	4th	100 m	10.7 A
1965	Bolivarian Games	Quito, Ecuador	1st	110 m hurdles	14.5 A
1966	Central American and Caribbean Games	San Juan, Puerto Rico	1st	110 m hurdles	14.2 (w)
1966	Central American and Caribbean Games	San Juan, Puerto Rico	6th	4 × 100 m relay	41.3
1967	Pan American Games	Winnipeg, Canada	12th (h)	100 m	10.78
1967	Pan American Games	Winnipeg, Canada	5th	110 m hurdles	14.76
1967	Pan American Games	Winnipeg, Canada	3rd	4 × 100 m relay	39.92
1968	Olympic Games	Mexico City, Mexico	17th (h)	110 m hurdles	14.09
