= Willie Turner (sprinter) =

American former sprinter (born 1948)

Medal record

Men's Athletics

Representing the United States

Pan American Games
Gold medal – first place	1967 Winnipeg	4 × 100 m relay
Silver medal – second place	1967 Winnipeg	100 m

Willie Turner (October 14, 1948 – February 20, 2026) was an American sprinter. Willie resided in his hometown of Yakima, Washington, where he coached sprinting at A.C. Davis High School for many years. He was greatly loved by the local community and worked part-time helping middle school children as a security guard for Wilson Middle School. Willie at one time in his illustrious carrier earned the title, for a brief period, as "Fastest Man Alive" for his efforts in the 100, 200, and 4x1 sprints. Among his many accomplishments he has won a silver medal in the 100m dash for the 1967 Pan American games. He was also favored to be a medalist at the Mexico Olympics before suffering a serious injury which effectively eliminated him from the competition. He still holds sprinting records at A.C. Davis High School in Yakima and Oregon State University where he is considered one of the school's best sprinters in the College's history.
