= Statue of Harry Jerome =

Statue in Vancouver, British Columbia, Canada

Harry Jerome
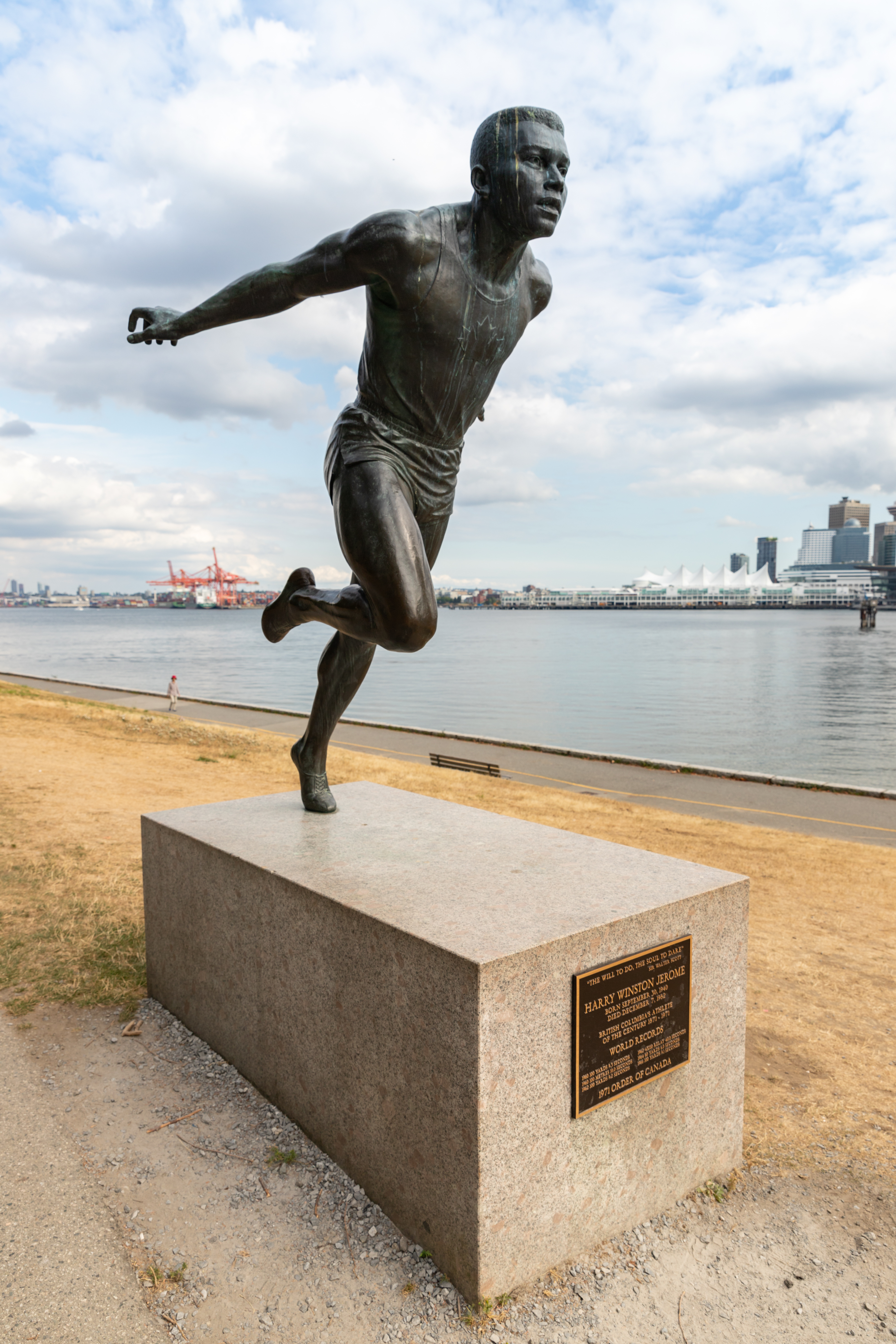
- The statue in 2018
- Artist: Jack Harman
- Year: 1986
- Type: Sculpture
- Medium: Bronze
- Subject: Harry Jerome
- Dimensions: 2.7 m (9 ft)
- Location: Vancouver, British Columbia, Canada; 49°17′54″N 123°07′09″W

Harry Jerome is an outdoor 1986 bronze sculpture by Jack Harman of Canadian track and field runner Harry Jerome, installed at Stanley Park in Vancouver, British Columbia.

== Description ==
The 9-foot (2.7 m) statue commemorates Jerome's running career and depicts the sprinter with his "chest thrust forward into the finish tape".

== History ==
The sculpture was unveiled in 1988. Someone placed an Iron Man helmet on the statue without permission in 2015; reports attributed the helmet to mischief or a guerrilla marketing campaign for the pending premiere of Marvel's Avengers: Age of Ultron. The statue's plaque was stolen in 2016. Toronto artist Moya Garrison-Msingwana's 2019 Google Doodle commemorating Jerome's birthday was "loosely inspired" by the statue.

== See also ==
- 1986 in art
