= Athletics at the 1970 Summer Universiade – Men's 110 metres hurdles =

The men's 110 metres hurdles event at the 1970 Summer Universiade was held at the Stadio Comunale in Turin on 5 and 6 September 1970.

== Medalists ==
Gold	Silver	Bronze
David Hemery; Great Britain	Günther Nickel; West Germany	Sergio Liani; Italy

== Results ==
=== Heats ===
Wind:
Heat 1: 0.0 m/s, Heat 2: -0.2 m/s, Heat 3: ? m/s

Rank	Heat	Athlete	Nationality	Time	Notes
1	1	Sergio Liani	Italy	14.1	Q
2	1	Mal Baird	Australia	14.3	Q
3	1	George Neeland	Canada	14.7	
4	1	Klaus Potsch	Austria	14.9	
1	2	David Hemery	Great Britain	14.1	Q
2	2	Juan Morales	Cuba	14.1	Q
3	2	Ron Draper	United States	14.2	q
4	2	Dragan Stoicević	Yugoslavia	14.4	q
5	2	Nicolas Debremou Yao	Ivory Coast	15.0	
6	2	Pierre Vinatier	France	15.1	
7	2	F. Okunowo	Nigeria	15.2	
8	2	Abdelkader Boudjéma	Algeria	15.2	
1	3	Günther Nickel	West Germany	14.0	Q
2	3	Alan Pascoe	Great Britain	14.4	Q
3	3	Luigi Donofrio	Italy	14.5	
4	3	Alberto Matos	Portugal	15.1	
5	3	Valdir Barbanti	Brazil	15.1	
6	3	Nurullah Çandan	Turkey	15.4	
7	3	Athanasios Lazaridis	Greece	16.3	

=== Final ===
Wind: 0.0 m/s

Rank	Name	Nationality	Time	Notes
1st place, gold medalist(s)	David Hemery	Great Britain	13.8	
2nd place, silver medalist(s)	Günther Nickel	West Germany	13.9	
3rd place, bronze medalist(s)	Sergio Liani	Italy	13.9	
4	Juan Morales	Cuba	14.0	
5	Ron Draper	United States	14.1	
6	Mal Baird	Australia	14.1	
7	Alan Pascoe	Great Britain	14.3	
8	Dragan Stoicević	Yugoslavia	14.3	
