= Tony Nelson (hurdler) =

Canadian hurdler

Personal information
- Nationality: Canadian
- Born: 30 November 1950 (age 74)

Sport
- Sport: Track and field
- Event: 110 metres hurdles

Tony Nelson (born 30 November 1950) is a Canadian hurdler. He competed in the men's 110 metres hurdles at the 1972 Summer Olympics.
