= Clifton Bertrand =

Trinidad and Tobago sprinter (1936–2020)

Personal information
- Born: 2 March 1936 Arima, Trinidad and Tobago
- Died: 28 November 2020 (aged 84) New York City, United States
Medal record
Men's athletics
Representing British West Indies
Pan American Games
| Bronze medal – third place | Chicago 1959 | 4×100 metres |
Representing Trinidad and Tobago
Pan American Games
| Bronze medal – third place | Sao Paulo 1963 | 400 metres |
| Bronze medal – third place | Sao Paulo 1963 | 4×100 metres |

Clifton Bertrand (2 March 1936 – 28 November 2020) was a Trinidadian sprinter.

== Biography ==
He won a gold medal in 200 meters at the 1957 British West Indies Championships, and three gold medals at the 1958 British West Indies Championships. He participated in three events at the 1958 British Empire and Commonwealth Games, but did not reach the final in either. However, at the 1959 Pan American Games he finished fifth in the 200 metres and won a bronze with the British West Indian Federation 4 x 100 metres relay team. His teammates were Michael Agostini, Wilton Jackson and Jamaican Dennis Johnson. Bertrand then competed at the 1960 Olympic Games, reaching the quarter-finals of the 200 metres. He also ran in the heats of the 4×400 metres relay for the British West Indian Federation team that would later, in the final, win a bronze medal.

Bertrand left Trinidad and Tobago for the United States. He eventually graduated with a B.S. and M.S. from the New York University, an M.S.Ed and an Advanced Certificate in Education from Brooklyn College, and later a Doctor of Education from the Columbia University. He finished sixth in the 1962 NCAA championship.

At the 1963 Pan American Games he won two bronze medals; in the 400 metres and the 4 x 100 metres relay with teammates Anthony Jones, Irving Joseph and Cipriani Phillip. He competed at the 1964 Olympic Games without reaching the final, and finally at the 1966 Commonwealth Games he finished eighth in the 4 x 110 yards relay with teammates Henry Noel, Cipriani Phillip and Winston Short.

In 2008, Bertrand was inducted into the Trinidad and Tobago Hall of Fame along with other well respected and deserving Trinidadian athletes.

His wife Phoebe Yuille Bertrand died in 2003 and their daughter, a Georgetown University Law Center graduate, resides in New York with her husband.
