= Jack Harman (artist) =

Canadian sculptor

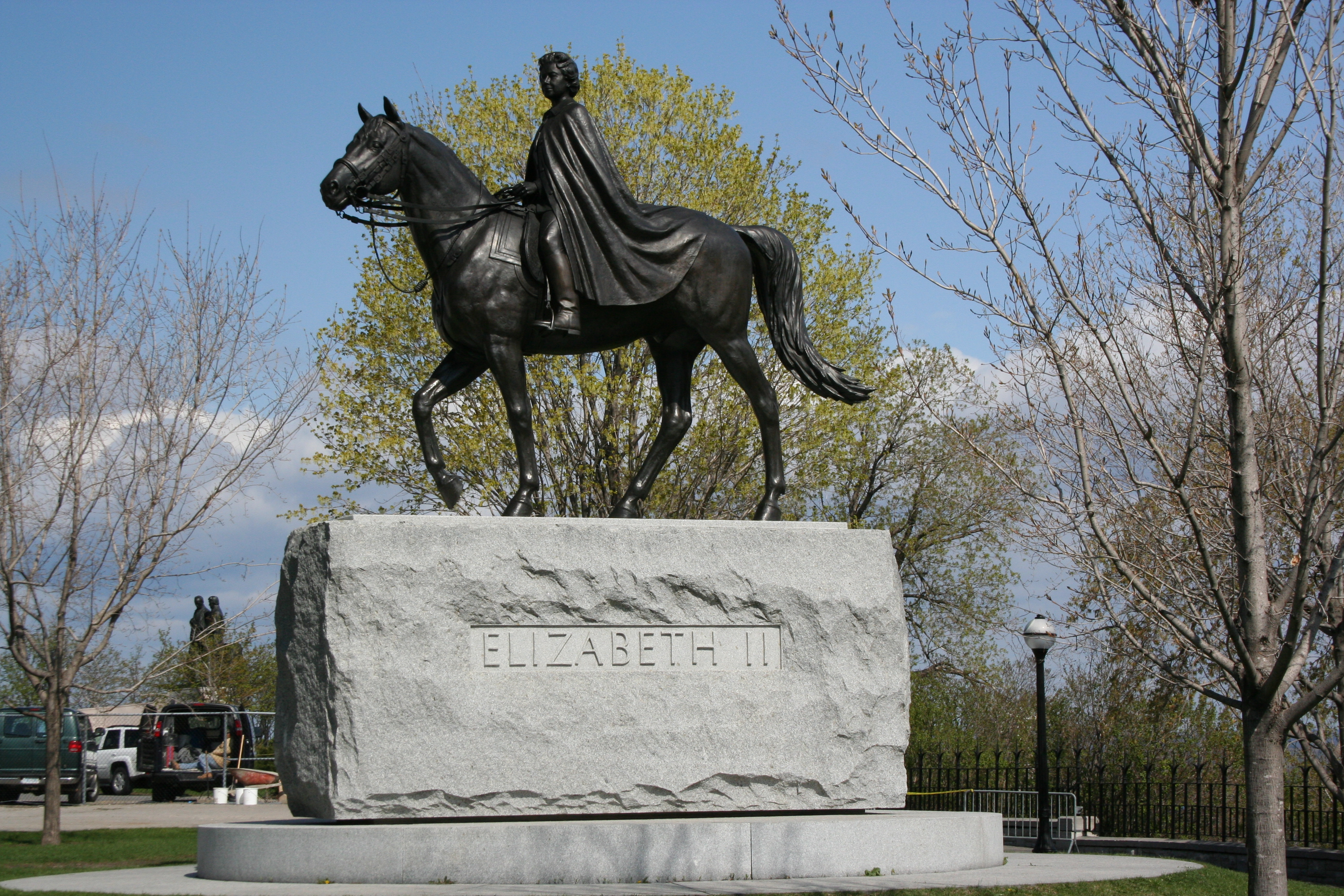
Statue of Queen Elizabeth II on Parliament Hill, Ottawa

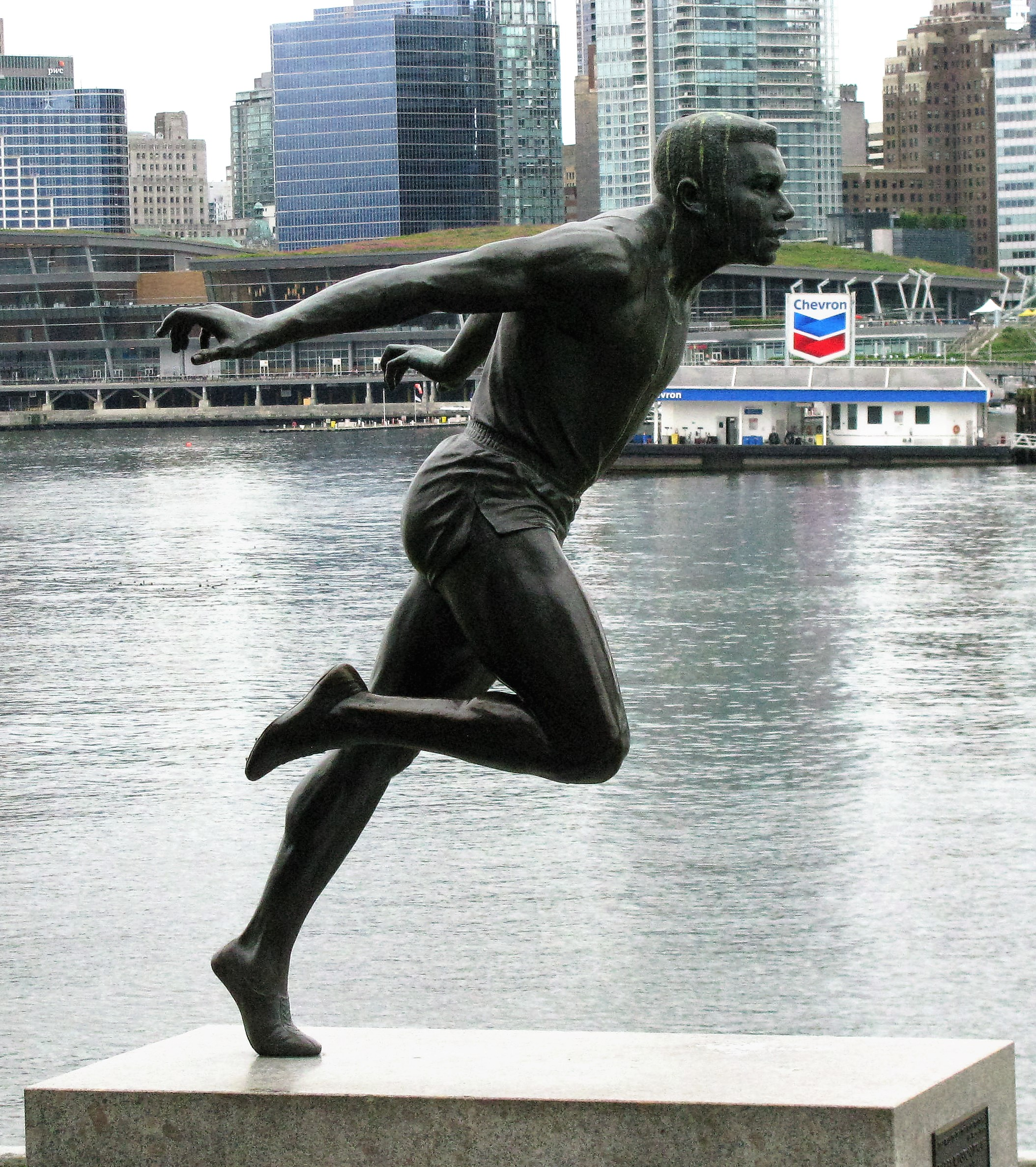
Statue of Harry Jerome

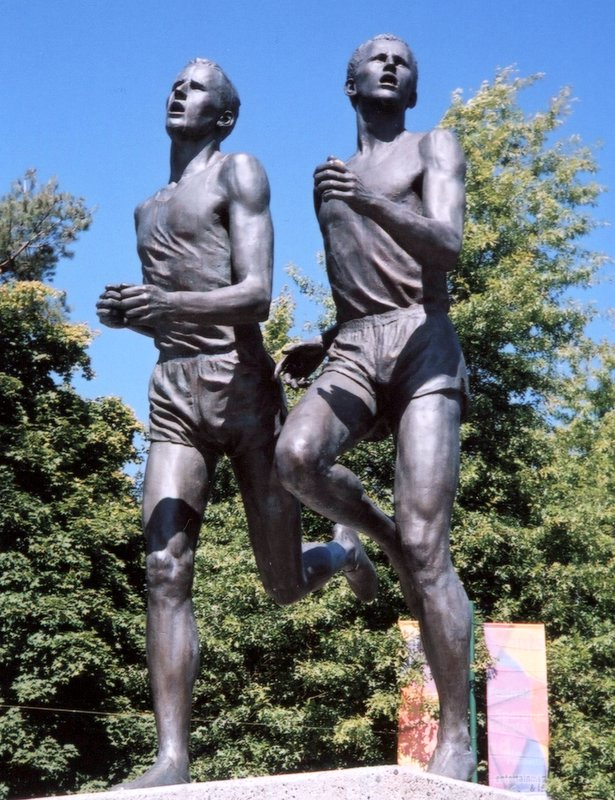
Statue of John Landy and Roger Bannister's "Miracle Mile"

Jack Harman OBC (1927–2001) was a Canadian sculptor from Vancouver, British Columbia, the "creator of some of Canada's best-known public art," including an equestrian monument of Queen Elizabeth II on Parliament Hill, unveiled by the Queen in 1992. He studied at the Vancouver School of Art and Slade School of Art and Hammersmith School of Art in England. He later taught at the VSA as well as at the UBC Extension School.

His public sculptures in Vancouver include Statue of Harry Jerome, The Family (formerly at Pacific Press Building, now on Granville Island), at the Pacific National Exhibition and at the Vancouver Law Courts. His work is also elsewhere in Canada, including Parliament Hill and the British Columbia Legislature. His work is also held by the Government of Ontario Art Collection, the University of British Columbia and the City of Nanaimo. He also contributed to the Peacekeeping Monument in Ottawa.

He received the Order of British Columbia in 1996, cited for creating "some of Vancouver’s best known sculpture."
