= Pablo McNeil =

Jamaican sprinter and coach

Medal record

Men's athletics

Representing Jamaica

British Empire and Commonwealth Games
Silver medal – second place	1966 Kingston	4×110 yards relay

Pablo S. McNeil (12 September 1939 – 4 July 2011) was a Jamaican track and field sprinter and sprinting coach. He participated in the 1964 Summer Olympics and the 1968 Summer Olympics. McNeil reached the semifinal of the 100 metres in the 1964 Olympics, finishing sixth with a wind assisted run of 10.30 seconds. He also ran as the first leg in the Jamaican 4×100 metres sprint relay team, placing fourth in the final with a time of 39.4 seconds. At his final Olympics in 1968, McNeil competed in the 100 metres once again but failed to pass the first round. His 100 metres personal best is a run of 10.54 seconds set in 1964.

Among his other sprinting achievements were a number of medals from the British West Indies Championships. He took the 200 m silver at the 1964 Championships, but his greatest haul came at the following year's event, where he finished just behind Lennox Miller for the 100 m silver medal and beat Clifton Bertrand, a two-time champion, to the 200 m gold with a run of 20.8 seconds. He represented Jamaica at the 1966 British Empire and Commonwealth Games in Kingston, Jamaica. He was part of the Jamaican 4×110 yards relay which won the silver medal and he reached the quarter-finals of both the 100-yard dash and 220 yard dash.

Following his retirement from athletics, McNeil became a sprinting coach at William Knibb Memorial High School in Trelawny Parish, Jamaica, training youths such as Usain Bolt. McNeil convinced Bolt to give up cricket in favour of track sprinting. He coached the young Jamaican throughout his high school career and their partnership came to an end when Bolt was sent to Kingston to work with the Jamaica Amateur Athletic Association at the age of 16. He intended to write a book about his time as Bolt's trainer titled The Bolt of Lightning and Me. McNeil suffered a stroke in December 2007 and his vision was from then on impaired.

== International competitions ==
Year	Competition	Venue	Position	Event	Notes
Representing Jamaica
1962	Central American and Caribbean Games	Kingston, Jamaica	23rd (h)	100 m	11.2
1962	Central American and Caribbean Games	Kingston, Jamaica	3rd	4 × 100 m relay	40.8
1964	British West Indies Championships	Kingston, Jamaica	2nd	200 m	21.6
1964	Olympic Games	Tokyo, Japan	6th (sf)	100 m	10.3
1964	Olympic Games	Tokyo, Japan	4th	4 × 100 m relay	39.4
1965	British West Indies Championships	Bridgetown, Barbados	2nd	100 m	10.7
1965	British West Indies Championships	Bridgetown, Barbados	1st	200 m	20.8
1966	Central American and Caribbean Games	San Juan, Puerto Rico	5th	100 m	10.6
1966	Central American and Caribbean Games	San Juan, Puerto Rico	11th (h)	200 m	22.3
1966	Central American and Caribbean Games	San Juan, Puerto Rico	1st	4 × 100 m relay	40.5
1966	British Empire and Commonwealth Games	Kingston, Jamaica	16th (qf)	100 y	10.0
1966	British Empire and Commonwealth Games	Kingston, Jamaica	15th (qf)	220 y	21.7
1966	British Empire and Commonwealth Games	Kingston, Jamaica	2nd	4 × 110 y relay	40.0
1967	Pan American Games	Winnipeg, Canada	9th (sf)	100 m	10.55^{1}
1967	Pan American Games	Winnipeg, Canada	5th	4 × 100 m relay	40.23
1968	Olympic Games	Mexico City, Mexico	45th (h)	100 m	10.62

^{1}Did not start in the final
