= Winston Short =

Trinidad and Tobago sprinter

Winston Short (born 27 March 1944) is a retired athlete from Trinidad and Tobago who specialized in the 200 metres and 4×100 metres relay. He was born in Arima.

He represented his country at the 1968 Summer Olympics, as well as in the relay races at the 1967 Pan American Games and 1966 British Empire and Commonwealth Games. He was a relay medallist at the 1966 Central American and Caribbean Games. He was a double bronze medallist in the sprints at the British West Indies Championships in 1965. He graduated from Grambling College, Louisiana, United States.

== International competitions ==
Year	Competition	Venue	Position	Event	Notes
1965	British West Indies Championships	Bridgetown, Barbados	3rd	100 m	10.9
1965	British West Indies Championships	Bridgetown, Barbados	3rd	200 m	21.3
1966	Central American and Caribbean Games	San Juan, Puerto Rico	13th (h)	100 m	10.7
1966	Central American and Caribbean Games	San Juan, Puerto Rico	4th (h)	200 m	21.9^{1}
1966	Central American and Caribbean Games	San Juan, Puerto Rico	2nd	4 × 100 m relay	40.6
1966	British Empire and Commonwealth Games	Kingston, Jamaica	17th (qf)	100 y	10.0
1966	British Empire and Commonwealth Games	Kingston, Jamaica	14th (sf)	220 y	21.8
1966	British Empire and Commonwealth Games	Kingston, Jamaica	8th	4 × 110 y relay	41.3
1967	Pan American Games	Winnipeg, Canada	16th (sf)	100 m	11.28
1967	Pan American Games	Winnipeg, Canada	4th	4 × 100 m relay	40.16
1968	Olympic Games	Mexico City, Mexico	29th (qf)	200 m	21.51
1968	Olympic Games	Mexico City, Mexico	10th (sf)	4 × 100 m relay	39.5

^{1}Did not start in the semifinals
