= Cipriani Phillip =

Trinidad and Tobago sprinter

Cipriani Agustus "Cip" Phillip (6 September 1936 – 16 September 2007) was a sprinter from Trinidad and Tobago. He was one of at least ten children. He lived in Christiansted, United States Virgin Islands, and died in Orlando, Florida. Phillip had two daughters, Erica and Yvette, and one son, Cipriani, Jr., a life partner, Lillian Troutman, and her two sons, Andy Troutman and Anthony St. Louis.

== International competitions ==
Year	Competition	Venue	Position	Event	Notes
Representing Trinidad and Tobago
1962	Central American and Caribbean Games	Kingston, Jamaica	5th (sf)	100 m	10.5
1962	Central American and Caribbean Games	Kingston, Jamaica	10th (sf)	200 m	22.0
1962	Central American and Caribbean Games	Kingston, Jamaica	2nd	4 × 100 m relay	40.7
1963	Pan American Games	São Paulo, Brazil	7th (h)	100 m	10.66
1963	Pan American Games	São Paulo, Brazil	3rd	4 × 100 m relay	40.87
1966	Central American and Caribbean Games	San Juan, Puerto Rico	7th (sf)	100 m	10.6
1966	Central American and Caribbean Games	San Juan, Puerto Rico	2nd	4 × 100 m relay	40.6
1966	British Empire and Commonwealth Games	Kingston, Jamaica	26th (h)	100 y	10.3^{1}
1966	British Empire and Commonwealth Games	Kingston, Jamaica	8th	4 × 110 y relay	41.3

^{1}Did not start in the quarterfinals
