= Colin Thurton =

Belizean sprinter

Colin Evandale Thurton (born April 28, 1943) is a former Belizean track and field athlete, born in Belize City. He competed in the Men's 220 yards at the 1966 British Empire and Commonwealth Games, the Men's 200 metres at the 1968 Summer Olympics, and the Men's 100 metres at the 1976 Summer Olympics.
