= Ronnie Ray =

American sprinter (born 1954)

Personal information
- Born: January 2, 1954 (age 72)
Medal record
Men's Athletics
Representing the United States
Pan American Games
Gold medal – first place	1975 Mexico City	400 metres
Gold medal – first place	1975 Mexico City	4x400 metres

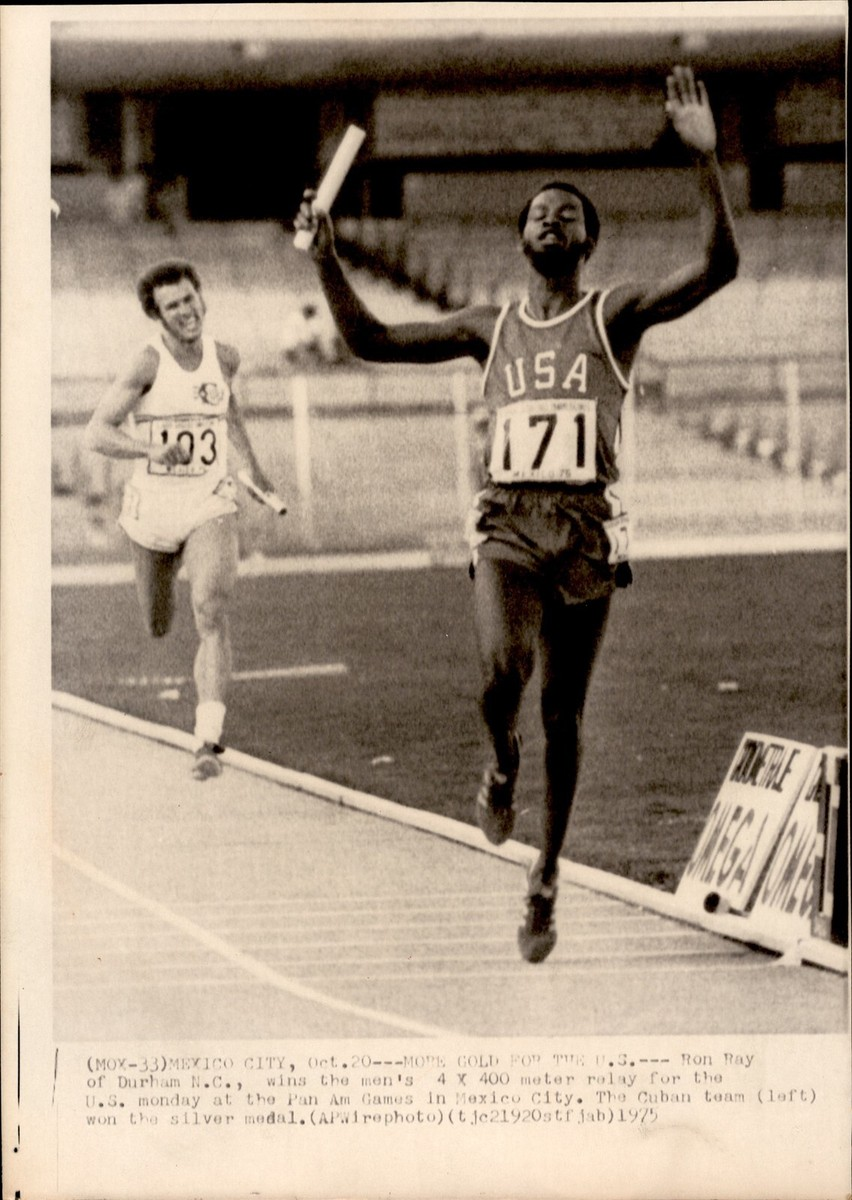
Ron Ray of Durham N.C., wins the men's 4 X 400 meter relay for the U.S. Monday at the Pan Am Games In Mexico City. The Cuban team (lott) won the silver medal.

Ronnie Ray (born January 2, 1954) is an American retired male track and field athlete, who competed in the sprints events during his career. He is best known for winning the men's 400 metres event at the 1975 Pan American Games in Mexico City, Mexico. In that race on 18 October 1975 Ray set his personal best: 44.45.

In 1972, while competing for Homer L. Ferguson High School in Newport News, Virginia, Ray established the National high school record in the 440 yard dash. High school competition shifted to metric distances in 1980, so the race is now rarely contested. Ray's time of 45.8 remains the record to this day.
