= Ron Monsegue =

Trinidad and Tobago sprinter

Ronald S. Monsegue (born May 17, 1942 in Trinidad) is a retired athlete from Trinidad and Tobago who specialized in the 100 metres.

At the 1967 Pan American Games he finished seventh in the 100 metres, fourth in the 4 × 100 metres relay and sixth in the 4 × 400 metres relay. He also competed at the 1968 Summer Olympics.

He graduated from Moorhead State College, Minnesota, USA.
