= John Morbey =

British-Bermudian athlete (born 1939)

Personal information
- Nationality: British/Bermudian
- Born: 9 August 1939
- Died: 27 May 2026 (aged 86)
- Height: 184 cm (6 ft 0 in)
- Weight: 77 kg (170 lb)

Sport
- Sport: Athletics
- Event: long jump
- Club: Birchfield Harriers
Medal record
Representing Bermuda
British Empire and Commonwealth Games
Silver medal – second place	1966 Kingston	Long jump

John Michael Morbey (born 9 August 1939) is a British/Bermudian former long jumper, triple jumper and sprinter who competed at the 1964 Summer Olympics.

== Biography ==
Morbey finished second behind Lynn Davies in the long jump event at the 1964 AAA Championships. Later that year at the 1964 Olympic Games in Tokyo, he represented Great Britain in the long jump and finished eleventh behing gold medal winner Davies.

Representing Bermuda, he won a silver medal in the long jump at the 1966 British Empire and Commonwealth Games. Morbey also placed fifteenth in the triple jump and was eliminated in the heats of the 110 yards and 4 x 110 yards relay.

Morbey was the Bermudian team manager at the 1986 Commonwealth Games, when the Bermudian authorities decided to join the boycott of the Games. The Bermudian team was a particularly late withdrawal as its athletes appeared in the opening ceremony and in the opening day of competition before the Bermuda Olympic Association decided to formally withdraw.
