= James Addy =

Ghanaian sprinter (1939–2009)

Medal record

Men's athletics

Representing Ghana

British Empire and Commonwealth Games
Gold medal – first place	1966 Kingston	4×110 yards relay

James Aryee Addy (9 December 1939 – 26 April 2009) was a Ghanaian sprinter who competed in the 1960 Summer Olympics, in the 1964 Summer Olympics, in the 1968 Summer Olympics, and in the 1972 Summer Olympics.

Addy was born in Accra in 1939 and died there in 2009, aged 69.
