= Lynn Headley =

Jamaican sprinter (born 1943)

Personal information
- Born: 7 April 1943 (age 83) Kingston, Colony of Jamaica, British Empire

Sport
- Sport: Sprinting
- Event: 100 metres
Medal record
Men's athletics
Representing Jamaica
British Empire and Commonwealth Games
Silver medal – second place	1966 Kingston	4×110 yards relay

Lynn Headley (born 7 April 1943) is a Jamaican sprinter. He competed in the men's 100 metres at the 1964 Summer Olympics.
