= Alfredo Deza (hurdler) =

Peruvian hurdler

Personal information
- Full name: Alfredo Juan Deza Fuller
- Nationality: Peruvian
- Born: 24 June 1944 (age 82) Bellavista, Peru
- Height: 1.85 m (6 ft 1 in)
- Weight: 78 kg (172 lb)

Sport
- Sport: Track and field
- Event: 110 metres hurdles

Alfredo Juan Deza Fuller (born 24 June 1944) is a Peruvian hurdler. He competed in the men's 110 metres hurdles at the 1968 Summer Olympics.

His son Alfredo Deza Ganoza was a high jumper.

== International competitions ==
Year	Competition	Venue	Position	Event	Notes
Representing Peru
1962	South American Junior Championships	Lima, Peru	2nd	110 m hurdles	15.8
1967	Pan American Games	Winnipeg, Canada	7th	110 m hurdles	15.01
1967	Pan American Games	Winnipeg, Canada	8th	4 × 100 m relay	41.00
1967	South American Championships	Buenos Aires, Argentina	18th (h)	200 m	23.2
1967	South American Championships	Buenos Aires, Argentina	1st	110 m hurdles	14.5
1968	Olympic Games	Mexico City, Mexico	26th (h)	110 m hurdles	14.38
1969	South American Championships	Quito, Ecuador	2nd	110 m hurdles	14.6
1969	South American Championships	Quito, Ecuador	3rd	4 × 400 m relay	3:13.7
1970	Bolivarian Games	Maracaibo, Venezuela	2nd	110 m hurdles	14.5
1970	Bolivarian Games	Maracaibo, Venezuela	2nd	400 m hurdles	51.7
1970	Bolivarian Games	Maracaibo, Venezuela	2nd	4 × 400 m relay	3:08.7
1971	South American Championships	Lima, Peru	2nd	110 m hurdles	14.8
1973	Bolivarian Games	Panama City, Panama	2nd	110 m hurdles	14.5 (w)

== Personal bests ==
- 110 metres hurdles – 14.1 (1967)
