= Mel Cheskin =

English athlete

Personal information
- Nationality: British (English)
- Born: 6 June 1942 (age 83) Marylebone, England

Sport
- Sport: Athletics
- Event: Sprints
- Club: Polytechnic Harriers

Melvyn Peter Kevin Cheskin (born 6 June 1942), is a male former athlete who competed for England.

== Biography ==
Cheskin born in Marylebone, London, England, was an All-American sprinter for the Colorado Buffaloes track and field program, leading off their 4th-place 4 × 100 metres relay team at the 1964 NCAA University Division track and field championships.

Cheskin was selected by England to represent his country in Athletics events. He represented the 1966 England team in the 220 yards and sprint relay, at the 1966 British Empire and Commonwealth Games in Kingston, Jamaica.

In addition he competed at the 1966 European Athletics Championships in Budapest.
