= Gary Eddy =

Australian sprinter (1945–2023)

Medal record

Men's athletics

Representing Australia

British Empire and Commonwealth Games
Bronze medal – third place	1966 Kingston	4×110 yards relay

Gary Eddy (25 March 1945 – 16 April 2023) was an Australian sprinter who competed in the 1964 Summer Olympics.

Eddy is 3rd in the all time Australian 100 yard time of 9.52, in the 1966 Commonwealth Games, only Rohan Browning and Jack Hale have gone faster.

Gary Eddy died on 16 April 2023, at the age of 78.
