= Sydney Asiodu =

Nigerian sprinter

Personal information
- Nationality: Nigerian
- Born: 28 January 1944
- Died: 7 October 1967 (aged 23)

Sport
- Sport: Sprinting
- Event: 4 × 100 metres relay

Sydney Asiodu (28 January 1944 – 7 October 1967) was a Nigerian sprinter. He competed in the men's 4 × 100 metres relay at the 1964 Summer Olympics. He was killed in the 1967 Asaba massacre.
