= Ebenezer Addy =

Ghanaian sprinter

Medal record

Men's athletics

Representing Ghana

British Empire and Commonwealth Games
Gold medal – first place	1966 Kingston	4×110 yards relay

Ebenezer Charles O. Addy (born 5 November 1940) is a Ghanaian sociologist and former sprinter who competed in the 1964 Summer Olympics. He was married to Marian Ewurama Addy, a biochemist and the first Ghanaian woman to attain the rank of full professor of natural science.
