= Gary Holdsworth =

Australian sprinter

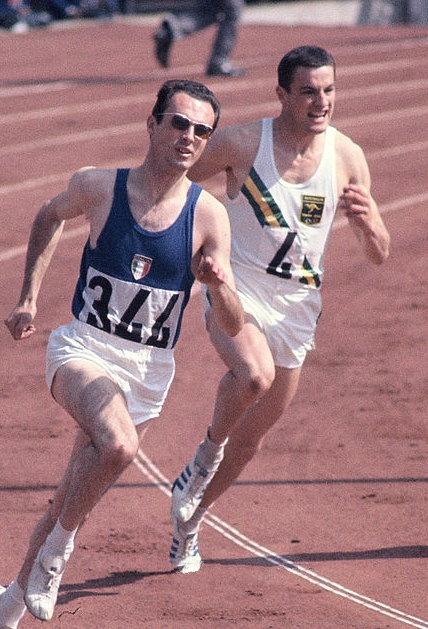
- Gary Holdsworth (right) competing against Livio Berruti in the 200 m at the 1964 Olympics

Personal information
- Full name: Gary Alfred Holdsworth
- Born: 1 August 1941 (age 84)
- Height: 1.79 m (5 ft 10 in)
- Weight: 77 kg (170 lb)

Sport
- Sport: Athletics
- Event: Sprint
- Club: East Melbourne Harriers

Achievements and titles
- Personal best(s): 100 m – 10.1 (1967); 200 m – 20.7 (1968)
Medal record
Men's athletics
Representing Australia
British Empire and Commonwealth Games
Bronze medal – third place	1966 Kingston	4×110 yards relay

Gary Alfred Holdsworth (born 1 August 1941) is an Australian former sprinter. He competed at the 1964 Summer Olympics in the 100 m, 200 m and 4 × 100 m relay, but was eliminated in the preliminaries in all three events.

== Career ==
Gary started his sprinting career at age 10, and after several years as a junior sprint champion, he won two Australian national sprint titles at 100 yards and 220 yards in 1961. That same year Gary represented Australia at the World Games in Helsinki.

In 1962, he was again the national champion in the 100 yards and placed 2nd in the 220 yards. He also represented Australia at the Perth Commonwealth Games, where he reached the final of the 100 yards placing 4th. He also competed in the 4 x 110 yards event at the games, where Australia placed 5th overall.

In 1963, Gary competed in the national championships where he placed 3rd in the 100 yards and reclaimed his national title in the 220 yards by winning that event. The following year, he placed 2nd in the 100 yards and held onto his national title in the 220 yards.

Gary represented Australia at the 1964 Tokyo Olympic Games, where he competed in the 100 metres, 200 metres and the 4 x 100 metres events.

In 1966, he competed in Commonwealth Games in Kingston, Jamaica, reaching the semi-finals in the 110 yards, a coming 6th in the 220 yards final. He was also a member of the 4 x 110 yards Australian team which claimed the bronze medal (3rd). In the same year he was the national champion for the 200 metres and 2nd in the 100 metres championship.

Gary competed in the Commonwealth team v USA and USSR in 1966 and 1967. In 1967 he won the 100 metres national championship for the last time and was 3rd in the 200 metres.

His best times were 10.1s for the 100 metres and 20.7s for the 200 metres.

He was coached by Neville Sillitoe at the East Melbourne Harriers.
