= Stanley Allotey =

Ghanaian sprinter (born 1942)

Medal record

Men's athletics

Representing Ghana

British Empire and Commonwealth Games
Gold medal – first place	1966 Kingston	220 yards
Gold medal – first place	1966 Kingston	4×110 yards relay

Stanley Fabian Allotey (born 14 November 1942) is a Ghanaian former sprinter who competed in the 1964 Summer Olympics. Allotey reached the quarterfinals in the men's 100 metres by finishing second in his heat but did not advance further. He was also a member of the Ghanaian 4 × 100 metres relay team, which was eliminated in the semifinals. At the 1966 British Empire and Commonwealth Games, he won two gold medals, in the 220 yards and the 4 × 110 yards relay.
