= David Ejoke =

Nigerian sprinter (born 1939)

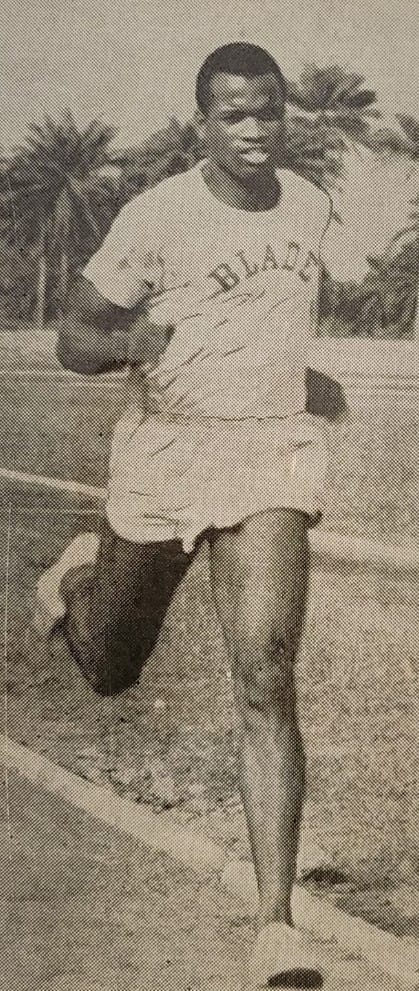
- Ejoke in 1963

Personal information
- Nationality: Nigerian
- Born: 8 November 1939
- Died: 5 November 2022 (aged 82)
- Height: 5 ft 11 in (180 cm)

Sport
- Sport: Sprinting
- Event: 200 metres

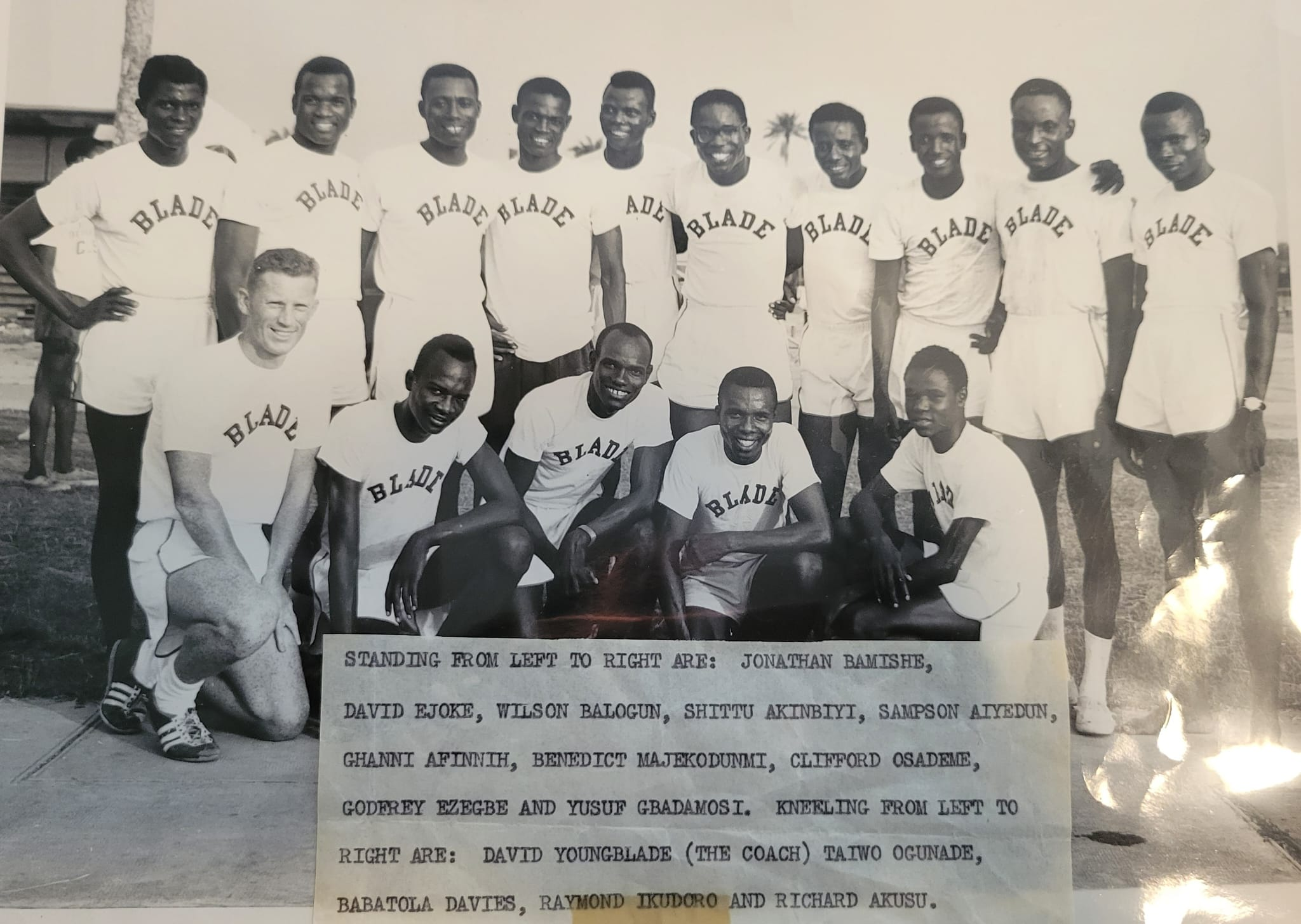

David Ejoke (born 8 November 1939) is a Nigerian sprinter. He competed in the 200 metres at the 1964 Summer Olympics and the 1968 Summer Olympics. He won a bronze medal in the 220 yards at the 1966 British Empire and Commonwealth Games. Ejoke also won a silver medal in the 200 metres at the 1965 All-Africa Games. See team photo:

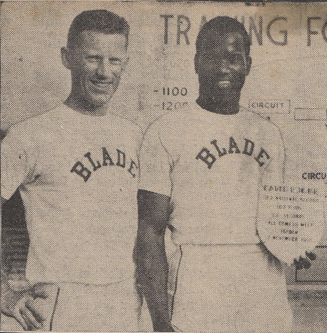
