= Don Domansky =

Canadian sprinter (born 1946)

Medal record

Men's Athletics

Representing Canada

Pan American Games
Bronze medal – third place	1967 Winnipeg	400 metres
Bronze medal – third place	1975 Mexico City	4 x 400 metres relay

British Empire and Commonwealth Games
Silver medal – second place	1966 Kingston	4 x 440 yard relay
Bronze medal – third place	1966 Kingston	440 yards

Bohdan "Don" Domansky (born August 11, 1946 in Ulm, Germany) is a retired track and field athlete, who represented Canada at two Summer Olympics (1968 and 1976), two British Commonwealth Games (1966 and 1970) and two Pan Am Games in 1967 and 1975 in the 400 metres and the 4x400 metre relay. He won medals at the British Commonwealth Games (silver 1966 4x400 metre relay, bronze in 1966 400 metres), medals at the Pan Am Games (silver in 1975 4x400 metre relay, bronze in 1967 400 metres) and achieved a 4th in the 4x400 metres in the Olympics in 1976. As member of the UCLA (University of California, Los Angeles) Don was a team NCAA champion, 4x400 metre NCAA champion and was a world record holder in the 440 yard relay in 1966. He held the Canadian individual open record in the 400 metres from 1967 to 1977 and helped set the Canadian 4x400 metre record in 1976 which still stands today. Track and Field News ranked him 4th in the world in the 400 metres in 1967. His fastest performance was a 44.3 400 metre relay split in the 1966 British Commonwealth Games.
