= Harry Jerome =

Canadian track and field runner

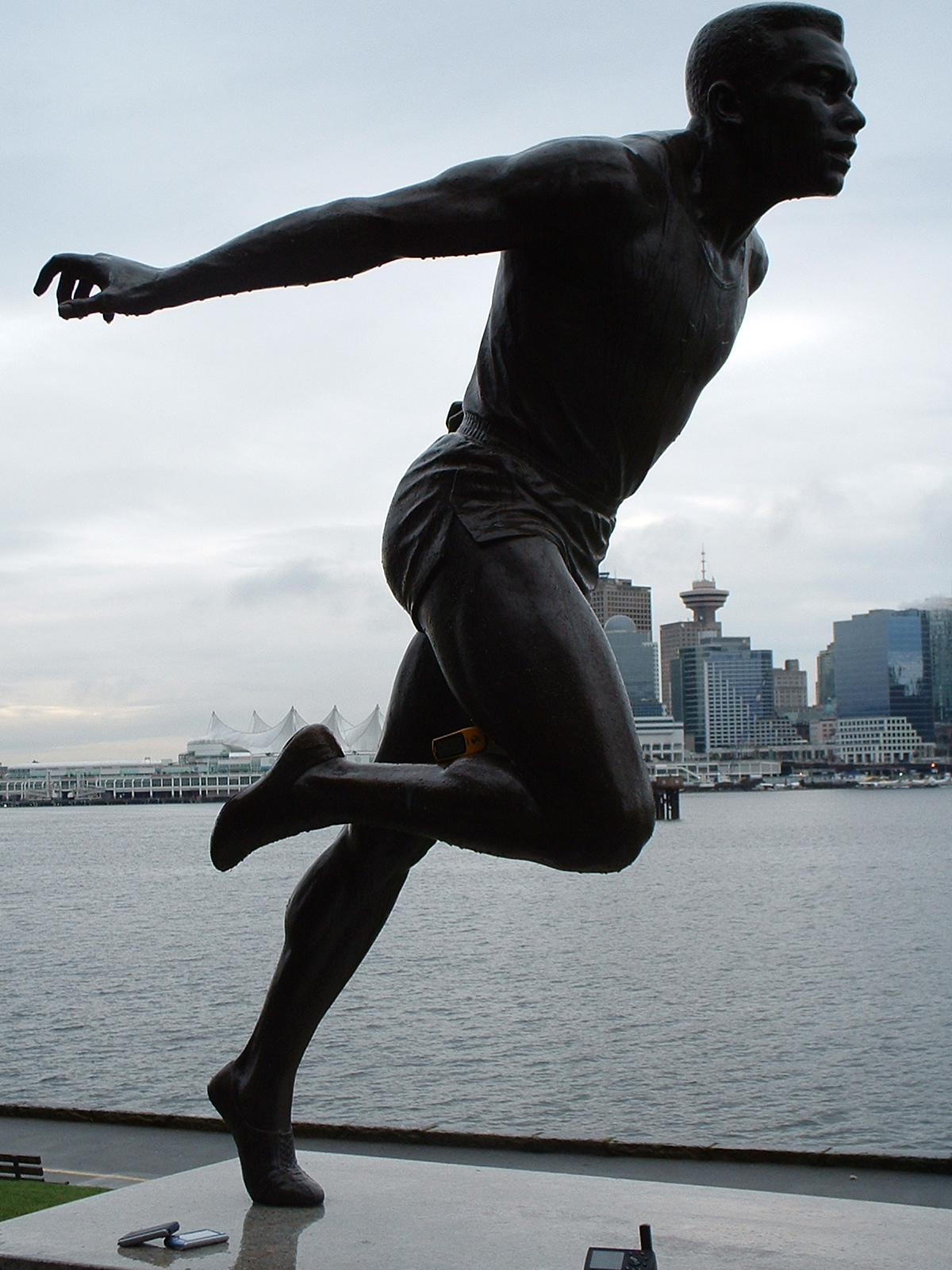
- Harry Jerome Statue

Personal information
- Nickname: Harold
- Born: Winston Jerome; September 30, 1940 Prince Albert, Saskatchewan, Canada
- Died: December 7, 1982 (aged 42) North Vancouver, British Columbia, Canada
- Height: 5 ft 11 in (1.8 m)

Sport
- Country: Canada
- Sport: Track and field
Medal record
Men's Athletics
Representing Canada
Olympic Games
Bronze medal – third place	1964 Tokyo	100 metres
Pan American Games
Gold medal – first place	1967 Winnipeg	100 metres
British Empire and Commonwealth Games
Gold medal – first place	1966 Kingston	100 yards
Universiade
Bronze medal – third place	1965 Budapest	100 metres

Harry Winston Jerome OC (September 30, 1940 – December 7, 1982) was a Canadian track and field sprinter and physical education teacher. He won a bronze medal at the 1964 Olympics in Tokyo and set a total of seven world records over the course of his career.

== Early life ==
Harry Jerome was born in Prince Albert, Saskatchewan, the son of Harry Vincent Jerome and Elsie Ellen Howard, and moved to North Vancouver, British Columbia, at age 12. His grandfather was John Howard, an American-born railway porter who represented Canada in the 1912 Summer Olympics. Harry's sister, Valerie Jerome, was also an Olympian who competed for Canada at the 1960 Summer Olympics in Rome.

== Athletic career ==
Jerome competed at the university level for Bill Bowerman at the University of Oregon. He was a member of the Canadian track and field team at the 1960, 1964, and 1968 Summer Olympics, winning 100 metre bronze in 1964. Jerome wore his University of Oregon sweats, rather than the contemporary practice of an official national outfit for all Olympic appearances, to warm up for the Olympic 100 metres in Tokyo. He won the gold at the 1966 British Empire and Commonwealth Games held in Kingston, Jamaica.

During his career, Jerome set a total of seven world records, including tying the 100 metre record at 10.0 seconds in 1960, equalling the mark established a month earlier by Germany's Armin Hary. Later he tied the world record for the 100 yard dash at 9.3 seconds (1961), making Jerome one of the few athletes to own both the 100 yard and 100 metre world record simultaneously. Jerome was a member of the University of Oregon 4 × 100 m relay team that tied the world record of 40.0 seconds in 1962; during the 1962 season, Harry ran 9.2s at the 100 yard dash 2 times. In 1966 he again tied a world record with a 9.1 time in the 100 yard. From 1963 to 1966 he held or equalled four world records concurrently.

He remains the only man to have held the 100 yard world record with 3 different times and is the oldest 100y world record holder, at 25 years old. Jerome never owned the 100y or 100m WR solely but matched his contemporaries.

Jerome won the British AAA Championships title at the 1961 AAA Championships.

Jerome continued to sprint successfully until the late 1960s, despite suffering an injury so severe at the Perth Commonwealth Games in 1962 that doctors initially believed he would be crippled for life.

== Teaching and post-athletic career ==
Jerome received a bachelor's degree in physical education from the University of Oregon in 1964 and taught with the Richmond School Board (1964–65) and then with the Vancouver School Board (1965–68). In 1968, he received a master's in physical education from Oregon.

After retiring from athletics in 1969, Jerome was invited by Prime Minister Pierre Trudeau to help create Canada's new Ministry of Sport. Jerome held a number of senior positions in the ministry but resigned over the government's cancellation of a large public-private partnership he had negotiated with Kellogg's to promote youth participation in athletics. During the 1980s, Jerome headed the Premier's Sport Award program in British Columbia.

Jerome died of a brain aneurysm on December 7, 1982, at the age of 42, in North Vancouver.

== Honours and tributes ==
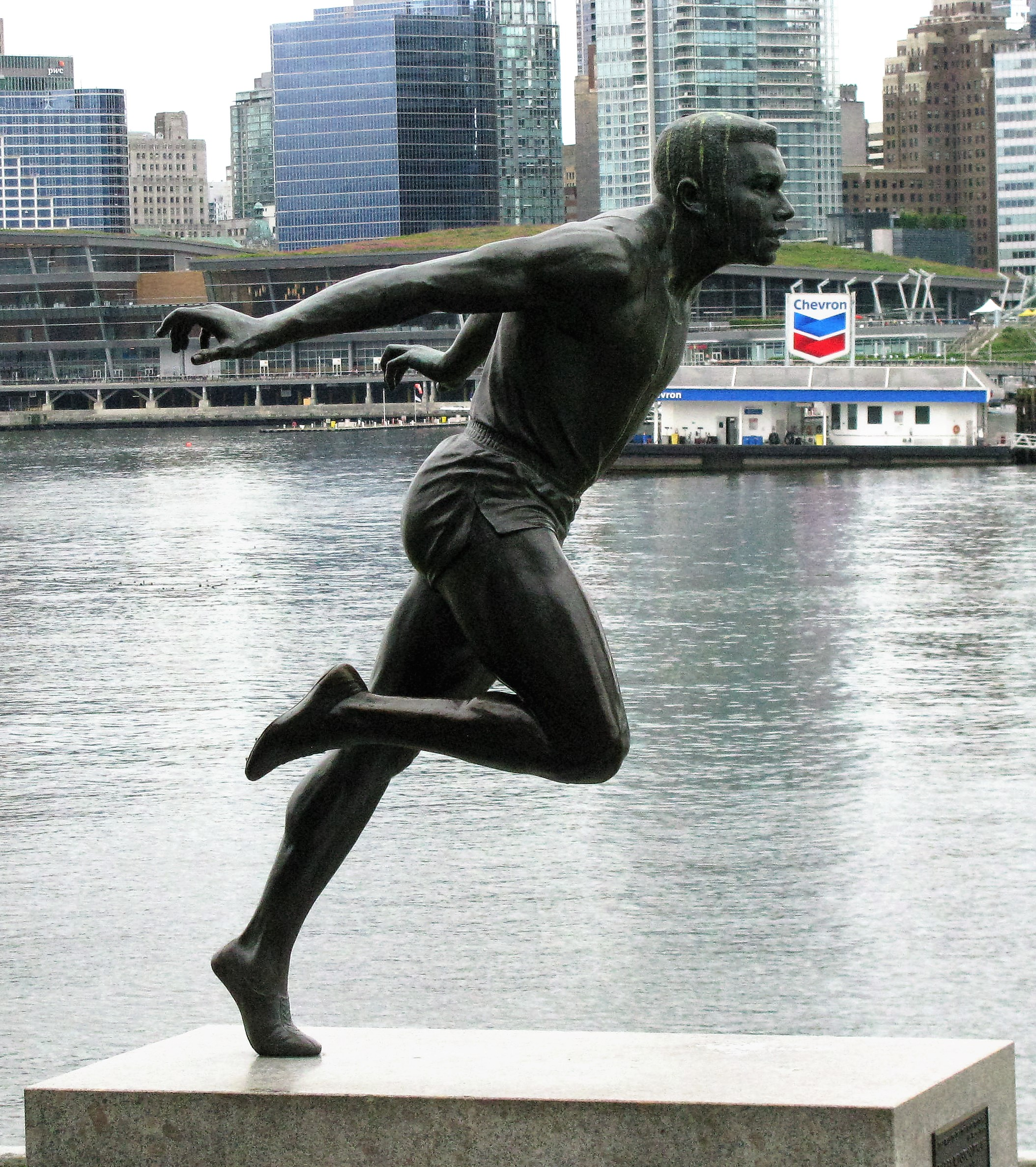
Statue of Harry Jerome in Stanley Park, Vancouver, British Columbia

In 1970, Jerome was made an Officer of the Order of Canada. The following year he was inducted into Canada's Sports Hall of Fame. Jerome was posthumously inducted into Canada's Walk of Fame in 2001 and was named a Person of National Historical Significance in 2010.

In 1984, the Labatts International Track Classic Pre-Olympic meet was renamed the Harry Jerome International Track Classic. The meet is held annually at Swangard Stadium in Burnaby, British Columbia. The Harry Jerome Sports Complex in North Vancouver, one block from North Vancouver High School where he first went out for track in 1958, and the Harry Jerome Sports Centre, home to the Burnaby Velodrome, are named after Jerome, as are the weight room at the University of Oregon and the track and field stadium in Prince Albert. The Stanley Park sea wall in Vancouver is graced with a 2.7-metre (9 ft) bronze statue of Jerome.

The annual Harry Jerome Awards, the national awards dinner for Canada's black community organized by the Black Business and Professionals Association (BBPA), is named after him.

Another meet, called the Harry Jerome Indoor Games was created in 2011. It is held at the Richmond Olympic Oval, once used for Speed Skating events at the 2010 Vancouver Olympics, but now a multi-purpose sports facility. The meet is mainly attended by high school students representing lower mainland clubs, as well as some university student-athletes, and younger athletes.

On September 30, 2019, Google celebrated Harry Jerome's 79th birthday with a Google Doodle.

The Harry Jerome Community Recreation Centre in North Vancouver, British Columbia is scheduled to open in July 2026.

== Works about Jerome ==
Production began in April 2009 on a feature-length biographical documentary entitled Mighty Jerome. Directed by Charles Officer and produced by the National Film Board of Canada (NFB) in Vancouver, the film was inspired by Fil Fraser’s book on Jerome, entitled Running Uphill.

NFB producer Selwyn Jacob had approached Officer — along with four other directors — in 2007 with idea of making a documentary about Jerome. Officer's proposal was selected by Jacob and the NFB, despite the fact that he had never directed a documentary before. The black and white film uses archival footage, interviews and dramatizations to explore Jerome's life and career. Officer recreated museum installations in Toronto, Edmonton and Vancouver to interview Jerome's contemporaries and family members. Jerome's sister Valerie refused to participate in the film due to objections over his portrayal in Fraser's book. The film premiered at the Vancouver International Film Festival on October 8, 2010.

Jerome's 100 metre bronze medal performance at the Tokyo 1964 Summer Olympics is captured in the documentary film Tokyo Olympiad (1965) directed by Kon Ichikawa. Slow-motion close-up footage of Jerome (along with other athletes) preparing for the race begins at the 26 minute mark and then the race is shown in its entirety at full speed.

== Achievements ==
- 1960 world record 100 m: 10.0 (tied record of Armin Hary)
- 1960 Summer Olympics 100 m Canadian team member
- 1961 world record 100 yds: 9.3
- 1962 world record 100 yds: 9.2
- 1962 world record 440 yds: 40.0 University of Oregon team member
- 1963 world record 60 yds indoor: 6.0
- 1964 Summer Olympics 100 m: 3rd 10.2 / 200 m: 4th 20.7
- 1966 world record 100 yds: 9.1
- 1966 Canadian record 220 yds: 20.4
- 1966 Commonwealth Games 100 yds: 1st 9.4
- 1967 Pan American Games 100m: 1st 10.2
- 1968 Summer Olympics 100 m: 7th 10.2
