= Athletics at the 1966 British Empire and Commonwealth Games =

Athletics at the 8th British Commonwealth Games
- Dates: 4–13 August 1966
- Host city: Kingston, Jamaica
- Venue: Independence Park
- Level: Senior
- Events: 34
- Participation: 396 athletes from 33 nations
- Records set: 11 GR

At the 1966 British Empire and Commonwealth Games, the athletics events were held at Independence Park in Kingston, Jamaica. A total of 34 events were contested, of which 23 by male and 11 by female athletes. This was the final athletics competition at the quadrennial games to feature events measured in imperial, rather than metric units. It was also the last edition to allow four athletes from each country in a single event before that number was reduced to three. Eleven Games records were improved over the course of the competition.

== Results ==
Athletics took place from 5 to 13 August.

== Medal summary ==
=== Men ===
Men's track and road events, medallists and times by event, with link to details: GR means Games Record
| Event | Gold | | Silver | | Bronze | |
| Event | Athlete | Time | Athlete | Time | Athlete | Time |
|---|---|---|---|---|---|---|
| 100 yards (wind: -0.8 m/s) | Harry Jerome (CAN) | 9.41 GR | Tom Robinson (BHS) | 9.44 | Edwin Roberts (TTO) | 9.52 |
| 220 yards (wind: +1.0 m/s) | Stanley Allotey (GHA) | 20.65 GR | Edwin Roberts (TTO) | 20.93 | David Ejoke (NGA) | 20.95 |
| 440 yards | Wendell Mottley (TTO) | 45.08 GR | Kent Bernard (TTO) | 46.06 | Don Domansky (CAN) | 46.42 |
| 880 yards | Noel Clough (AUS) | 1:46.9 GR | Wilson Kiprugut (KEN) | 1:47.2 | George Kerr (JAM) | 1:47.2 |
| 1 mile | Kip Keino (KEN) | 3:55.34 GR | Alan Simpson (ENG) | 3:57.27 | Ian Studd (NZL) | 3:58.61 |
| 3 miles | Kip Keino (KEN) | 12:57.4 GR | Ron Clarke (AUS) | 12:59.2 | Allan Rushmer (ENG) | 13:08.6 |
| 6 miles | Naftali Temu (KEN) | 27:14.21 GR | Ron Clarke (AUS) | 27:39.42 | Jim Alder (SCO) | 28:15.4 |
| Marathon | Jim Alder (SCO) | 2:22:08 | Bill Adcocks (ENG) | 2:22:13 | Mike Ryan (NZL) | 2:27:59 |
| 120 yards hurdles (wind: 0.0 m/s) | David Hemery (ENG) | 14.1 | Mike Parker (ENG) | 14.2 | Ghulam Raziq (PAK) | 14.3 |
| 440 yards hurdles | Ken Roche (AUS) | 50.95 | Kingsley Agbabokha (NGA) | 51.46 | Peter Warden (ENG) | 51.54 |
| 3000 metres steeplechase | Peter Welsh (NZL) | 8:29.44 | Kerry O'Brien (AUS) | 8:32.58 | Benjamin Kogo (KEN) | 8:32.81 |
| 4 × 110 yards relay | Ghana (GHA); Ebenezer Addy; Bonner Mends; James Addy; Stanley Allotey | 39.8 GR | Jamaica (JAM); Wes Clayton; Pablo McNeil; Lynn Headley; Michael Fray | 40.0 | Australia (AUS); Gary Eddy; Allen Crawley; Gary Holdsworth; Peter Norman | 40.0 |
| 4 × 440 yards relay | Trinidad and Tobago (TTO); Lennox Yearwood; Kent Bernard; Edwin Roberts; Wendell Mottley | 3:02.8 GR | Canada (CAN); Ross MacKenzie; Brian MacLaren; Don Domansky; Bill Crothers | 3:04.9 | England (ENG); Martin Winbolt-Lewis; John Adey; Peter Warden; Tim Graham | 3:06.5 |
| 20 miles walk | Ron Wallwork (ENG) | 2:44:43 | Ray Middleton (ENG) | 2:45:19 | Norman Read (NZL) | 2:46:29 |

Men's field events , medallists and heights or distances by event, with link to details
| Event | Gold | | Silver | | Bronze | |
| Event | Athlete | Height / distance | Athlete | Height / distance | Athlete | Height / distance |
|---|---|---|---|---|---|---|
| High jump | Lawrie Peckham (AUS) | 2.08 m | Samuel Igun (NGA) | 2.03 m | Anton Norris (BAR) | 2.00 m |
| Pole vault | Trevor Bickle (AUS) | 4.80 m | Mike Bull (NIR) | 4.72 m | Gerry Moro (CAN) | 4.65 m |
| Long jump | Lynn Davies (WAL) | 7.99 m | John Morbey (BMU) | 7.89 m | Wellesley Clayton (JAM) | 7.83 m |
| Triple jump | Samuel Igun (NGA) | 16.40 m (w) | George Ogan (NGA) | 16.08 m | Fred Alsop (ENG) | 15.96 m |
| Shot put | Dave Steen (CAN) | 18.79 m | Les Mills (NZL) | 18.37 m | George Puce (CAN) | 17.14 m |
| Discus throw | Les Mills (NZL) | 56.18 m | George Puce (CAN) | 55.94 m | Robin Tait (NZL) | 55.02 m |
| Hammer throw | Howard Payne (ENG) | 61.98 m | Praveen Kumar (IND) | 60.12 m | Muhammad Iqbal (PAK) | 59.56 m |
| Javelin throw | John FitzSimons (ENG) | 79.78 m | Nick Birks (AUS) | 76.16 m | Muhammad Nawaz (PAK) | 69.94 m |

Men's decathlon , medallists and points with link to details
| Event | Gold | | Silver | | Bronze | |
| Event | Athlete | Points | Athlete | Points | Athlete | Points |
|---|---|---|---|---|---|---|
| Decathlon | Roy Williams (NZL) | 7270 pts | Clive Longe (WAL) | 7123 pts | Gerry Moro (CAN) | 6983 pts |

=== Women ===
Women's track events, medallists and times by event, with link to details: GR means Games Record
| Event | Gold | | Silver | | Bronze | |
| Event | Athlete | Time | Athlete | Time | Athlete | Time |
|---|---|---|---|---|---|---|
| 100 yards (wind: 0.0 m/s) | Dianne Burge (AUS) | 10.6 GR | Irene Piotrowski (CAN) | 10.8 | Jill Hall (ENG) | 10.8 |
| 220 yards (wind: 0.0 m/s) | Dianne Burge (AUS) | 23.73 | Jenny Lamy (AUS) | 23.86 | Irene Piotrowski (CAN) | 23.92 |
| 440 yards | Judy Pollock (AUS) | 53.0 | Deidre Watkinson (ENG) | 54.1 | Una Morris (JAM) | 54.2 |
| 880 yards | Abby Hoffman (CAN) | 2:04.3 | Judy Pollock (AUS) | 2:04.5 | Anne Smith (ENG) | 2:05.0 |
| 80 metres hurdles (wind: 0.0 m/s) | Pam Kilborn (AUS) | 10.9 | Carmen Smith (JAM) | 11.0 | Jenny Wingerson (CAN) | 11.0 |
| 4 × 110 yards relay | Australia (AUS); Jennifer Lamy; Pam Kilborn; Joyce Bennett; Dianne Burge | 45.3 =GR | England (ENG); Maureen Tranter; Janet Simpson; Daphne Slater; Jill Hall | 45.6 | Jamaica (JAM); Adlin Mair; Una Morris; Vilma Charlton; Carmen Smith | 45.6 |

Women's field events, medallists and heights or distances by event, with link to details
| Event | Gold | | Silver | | Bronze | |
| Event | Athlete | Height / distance | Athlete | Height / distance | Athlete | Height / distance |
|---|---|---|---|---|---|---|
| High jump | Michele Brown (AUS) | 1.73 m | Dorothy Shirley (ENG) | 1.70 m | Robyn Woodhouse (AUS) | 1.70 m |
| Long jump | Mary Rand (ENG) | 6.36 m | Sheila Parkin (ENG) | 6.30 m | Violet Odogwu (NGA) | 6.15 m |
| Shot put | Val Young (NZL) | 16.50 m | Mary Peters (NIR) | 16.29 m | Nancy McCredie (CAN) | 15.34 m |
| Discus throw | Val Young (NZL) | 49.78 m | Jean Roberts (AUS) | 49.20 m | Carol Martin (CAN) | 48.70 m |
| Javelin throw | Margaret Parker (AUS) | 51.38 m | Anna Bocson (AUS) | 47.80 m | Jay Dahlgren (CAN) | 47.68 m |

== Medal table ==
* Host nation (Jamaica)

Medals won in athletics by nation, ranked
| Rank | Nation | Gold | Silver | Bronze | Total |
|---|---|---|---|---|---|
| 1 | Australia (AUS) | 11 | 8 | 2 | 21 |
| 2 | England (ENG) | 5 | 8 | 6 | 19 |
| 3 | New Zealand (NZL) | 5 | 1 | 4 | 10 |
| 4 | Canada (CAN) | 3 | 3 | 9 | 15 |
| 5 | Kenya (KEN) | 3 | 1 | 1 | 5 |
| 6 | Trinidad and Tobago (TRI) | 2 | 2 | 1 | 5 |
| 7 | Ghana (GHA) | 2 | 0 | 0 | 2 |
| 8 | Nigeria (NGR) | 1 | 3 | 2 | 6 |
| 9 | Wales (WAL) | 1 | 1 | 0 | 2 |
| 10 | Scotland (SCO) | 1 | 0 | 1 | 2 |
| 11 | Jamaica (JAM)* | 0 | 2 | 4 | 6 |
| 12 | Northern Ireland (NIR) | 0 | 2 | 0 | 2 |
| 13 | Bahamas (BAH) | 0 | 1 | 0 | 1 |
| 13 | Bermuda (BER) | 0 | 1 | 0 | 1 |
| 13 | India (IND) | 0 | 1 | 0 | 1 |
| 16 | Pakistan (PAK) | 0 | 0 | 3 | 3 |
| 17 | Barbados (BAR) | 0 | 0 | 1 | 1 |
| Totals (17 entries) | | 34 | 34 | 34 | 102 |

== Participating nations ==
- Aden (2)
- Antigua and Barbuda (7)
- Australia (32)
- Bahamas (14)
- Barbados (8)
- Bermuda (6)
- British Honduras (4)
- Canada (35)
- Ceylon (1)
- England (61)
- Fiji (1)
- Ghana (10)
- Gibraltar (1)
- Guyana (3)
- India (6)
- Isle of Man (3)
- Jamaica (49)
- Kenya (21)
- Malaysia (5)
- Mauritius (6)
- New Zealand (17)
- Nigeria (21)
- Northern Ireland (5)
- Pakistan (5)
- Papua New Guinea (2)
- Saint Vincent and the Grenadines (2)
- Scotland (18)
- Sierra Leone (11)
- Singapore (2)
- Tanzania (4)
- Trinidad and Tobago (16)
- Uganda (6)
- Wales (12)
