= 1973 European Athletics Indoor Championships – Men's 60 metres hurdles =

The men's 60 metres hurdles event at the 1973 European Athletics Indoor Championships was held on 11 March in Rotterdam.

== Medalists ==
Gold	Silver	Bronze
Frank Siebeck; East Germany	Adam Galant; Poland	Thomas Munkelt; East Germany

== Results ==
=== Heats ===
First 3 from each heat (Q) qualified directly for the semifinals.

Rank	Heat	Name	Nationality	Time	Notes
1	2	Adam Galant	Poland	7.86	Q
1	2	Günther Nickel	West Germany	7.86	Q
1	3	Frank Siebeck	East Germany	7.86	Q
4	4	Thomas Munkelt	East Germany	7.87	Q
5	1	Guy Drut	France	7.88	Q
5	4	Giuseppe Buttari	Italy	7.88	Q
7	4	Mirosław Wodzyński	Poland	7.89	Q
8	1	Leszek Wodzyński	Poland	7.90	Q
9	1	Eckart Berkes	West Germany	7.96	Q
9	1	Sergio Liani	Italy	7.96	
9	2	Nicolae Pertea	Romania	7.96	Q
9	3	Vlastimil Hoferek	Czechoslovakia	7.96	Q
13	3	Valentin Balakhnichev	Soviet Union	8.00	Q
13	4	Manfred Schumann	West Germany	8.00	
15	2	Petr Čech	Czechoslovakia	8.02	
16	3	Graham Gower	Great Britain	8.11	
17	1	Efstratios Vasiliou	Greece	8.25	
18	2	Henk van Enkhuizen	Netherlands	8.26	
19	3	Hubert König	Austria	8.35	NR
20	4	Rafael Cano	Spain	8.60	NR

=== Semifinals ===
First 3 from each heat (Q) qualified directly for the final.

Rank	Heat	Name	Nationality	Time	Notes
1	1	Frank Siebeck	East Germany	7.69	Q, CR
2	1	Mirosław Wodzyński	Poland	7.75	Q
3	2	Adam Galant	Poland	7.76	Q
4	2	Leszek Wodzyński	Poland	7.77	Q
5	1	Guy Drut	France	7.83	Q
5	2	Thomas Munkelt	East Germany	7.83	Q
7	2	Günther Nickel	West Germany	7.86	
8	1	Nicolae Pertea	Romania	7.96	
8	2	Giuseppe Buttari	Italy	7.96	
10	1	Eckart Berkes	West Germany	7.98	
11	1	Vlastimil Hoferek	Czechoslovakia	8.01	
12	2	Valentin Balakhnichev	Soviet Union	8.02	

=== Final ===
Rank	Name	Nationality	Time	Notes
1st place, gold medalist(s)	Frank Siebeck	East Germany	7.71	
2nd place, silver medalist(s)	Adam Galant	Poland	7.76	
3rd place, bronze medalist(s)	Thomas Munkelt	East Germany	7.81	
4	Mirosław Wodzyński	Poland	7.82	
5	Leszek Wodzyński	Poland	7.83	
6	Guy Drut	France	9.22	
