= Athletics at the 1972 Summer Olympics – Men's 110 metres hurdles =

Men's 110 metres hurdles at the Games of the XX Olympiad
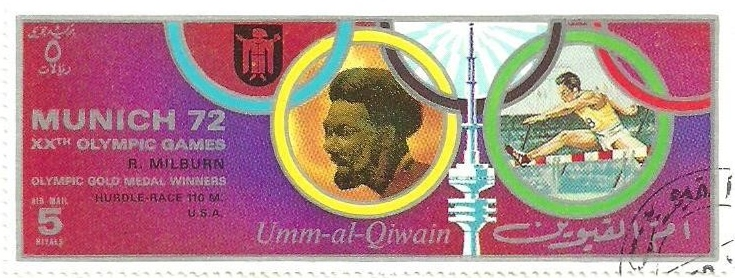
- Umm al-Quwain stamp commemorating Milburn's gold medal
- Venue: Olympic Stadium, Munich, West Germany
- Dates: 3–7 September 1972
- Competitors: 39 from 27 nations
- Winning time: 13.24 WR

Medalists
1st place, gold medalist(s)		Rod Milburn; United States
2nd place, silver medalist(s)		Guy Drut; France
3rd place, bronze medalist(s)		Tom Hill; United States

The men's 110 metres hurdles event at the 1972 Summer Olympics in Munich was held from 3–7 September. Thirty-nine athletes from 27 nations competed. The maximum number of athletes per nation had been set at 3 since the 1930 Olympic Congress. The event was won by Rod Milburn of the United States, the nation's ninth of nine consecutive victories and the 15th overall gold medal in the event for the Americans. Guy Drut's silver was France's first medal in the event and the best result by a non-American since 1936.

== Background ==
This was the 17th appearance of the event, which is one of 12 athletics events to have been held at every Summer Olympics. Two finalists from 1968 returned: gold medalist Willie Davenport of the United States and sixth-place finisher Bo Forssander of Sweden. Davenport's countryman Rod Milburn was the "heavy favorite" entering the season, however. He had won 27 consecutive finals and set the world record in the 120 yards version of the race going into the U.S. Olympic trials, where he hit two early hurdles and nearly missed the team, coming in third to Tom Hill and Davenport.

The Bahamas and Senegal each made their first appearance in the event; East Germany made its first appearance as a separate nation. The United States made its 17th appearance, the only nation to have competed in the 110 metres hurdles in each Games to that point.

== Competition format ==
The competition continued to use the three-round format used since 1908 (except 1960, which had four rounds) and eight-man semifinals and finals, as well as the "fastest loser" system, used since 1964. The first round consisted of five heats, with 7 or 8 hurdlers each. The top three hurdlers in each heat, along with the next fastest overall, advanced to the semifinals. The 16 semifinalists were divided into two semifinals of 8 hurdlers each; the top four hurdlers in each advanced to the 8-man final.

== Records ==
These were the standing world and Olympic records (in seconds) prior to the 1972 Summer Olympics.

World record	Martin Lauer (FRG)	13.2	Zürich, Switzerland	7 July 1959
Olympic record	Ervin Hall (USA)	13.3	Mexico City, Mexico	17 October 1968

In the final, Rod Milburn ran the hurdles in 13.24 seconds. This was recognized as equivalent to the standing hand-timed world record of 13.2 seconds, and was a new Olympic record. When the IAAF moved to keeping records based on auto-timed results in 1977, Milburn's performance was the best to that date and was recognized as the world record.

== Schedule ==
All times are Central European Time (UTC+1)

All three rounds were on separate days for the first time.

Date	Time	Round
Sunday, 3 September 1972	10:00	Round 1
Monday, 4 September 1972	15:00	Semifinals
Thursday, 7 September 1972	15:00	Final

== Results ==
=== Round 1 ===
The top three runners in each of the five heats, and the next fastest, advanced to the semifinal round.

==== Heat 1 ====
Rank	Lane	Athlete	Nation	Time	Notes
1	3	Frank Siebeck	East Germany	13.83	Q
2	7	Willie Davenport	United States	13.97	Q
3	4	Leszek Wodzyński	Poland	14.03	Q
4	5	Eckart Berkes	West Germany	14.14	
5	8	Adeola Aboyade-Cole	Nigeria	14.16	
6	1	Arnaldo Bristol	Puerto Rico	14.61	
7	6	Ahmed Ishtiaq Mubarak	Malaysia	14.78	
8	2	Muhammad Ahmed Bashir	Pakistan	15.38	
				Wind: +0.2 m/s	

==== Heat 2 ====
Rank	Lane	Athlete	Nation	Time	Notes
1	4	Tom Hill	United States	13.62	Q
2	5	Berwyn Price	Great Britain	13.94	Q
3	1	Günther Nickel	West Germany	13.95	Q
4	2	Mirosław Wodzyński	Poland	14.02	q
5	7	Viktor Myasnikov	Soviet Union	14.13	
6	8	Bo Forssander	Sweden	14.56	
7	3	Alberto Matos	Portugal	14.74	
8	6	Lee Chung-Ping	Republic of China	14.98	
				Wind: -1.6 m/s	

==== Heat 3 ====
Rank	Lane	Athlete	Nation	Time	Notes
1	4	Rod Milburn	United States	13.57	Q
2	3	Lubomír Nádeníček	Czechoslovakia	13.93	Q
3	8	Rich McDonald	Canada	14.36	Q
4	7	Danny Smith	Bahamas	14.46	
5	1	Jesper Tørring	Denmark	14.50	
6	5	Mal Baird	Australia	14.55	
7	2	Simbara Maki	Ivory Coast	14.59	
—	6	Giuseppe Buttari	Italy	DSQ	
				Wind: -0.7 m/s	

==== Heat 4 ====
Rank	Lane	Athlete	Nation	Time	Notes
1	5	Marco Acerbi	Italy	13.99	Q
2	6	Marek Jóźwik	Poland	14.06	Q
3	3	Alan Pascoe	Great Britain	14.08	Q
4	1	Abdoulaye Sarr	Senegal	14.12	
5	4	Manfred Schumann	West Germany	14.13	
6	8	Beat Pfister	Switzerland	14.33	
7	7	Moreldin Mohamed Hamdi	Sudan	15.80	
—	2	Alejandro Casañas	Cuba	DNF	
				Wind: +0.4 m/s	

==== Heat 5 ====
Rank	Lane	Athlete	Nation	Time	Notes
1	5	Guy Drut	France	13.78	Q
2	7	Sergio Liani	Italy	13.95	Q
3	4	Petr Čech	Czechoslovakia	14.04	Q
4	2	Godfrey Murray	Jamaica	14.16	
5	6	Loránd Milassin	Hungary	14.21	
6	1	David Wilson	Great Britain	14.31	
7	3	Tony Nelson	Canada	14.73	
				Wind: +0.7 m/s	

=== Semifinals ===
The top four in each of the two heats advanced to the final.

==== Semifinal 1 ====
Rank	Lane	Athlete	Nation	Time	Notes
1	7	Tom Hill	United States	13.47	Q
2	5	Guy Drut	France	13.49	Q
3	6	Leszek Wodzyński	Poland	13.81	Q
4	8	Petr Čech	Czechoslovakia	13.82	Q
5	4	Sergio Liani	Italy	13.90	
6	3	Rich McDonald	Canada	14.22	
7	2	Berwyn Price	Great Britain	14.37	
8	1	Mirosław Wodzyński	Poland	14.63	
				Wind: +1.2 m/s	

==== Semifinal 2 ====
Rank	Lane	Athlete	Nation	Time	Notes
1	5	Rod Milburn	United States	13.44	Q
2	8	Frank Siebeck	East Germany	13.58	Q
3	7	Willie Davenport	United States	13.73	Q
4	1	Lubomír Nádeníček	Czechoslovakia	13.89	Q
5	6	Marek Jóźwik	Poland	14.06	
6	3	Günther Nickel	West Germany	14.23	
7	2	Alan Pascoe	Great Britain	14.24	
8	4	Marco Acerbi	Italy	14.45	
				Wind: +0.0 m/s	

=== Final ===
Rank	Lane	Athlete	Nation	Time	Notes
1st place, gold medalist(s)	5	Rod Milburn	United States	13.24	WR, OR
2nd place, silver medalist(s)	8	Guy Drut	France	13.34	
3rd place, bronze medalist(s)	7	Tom Hill	United States	13.48	
4	1	Willie Davenport	United States	13.50	
5	6	Frank Siebeck	East Germany	13.71	
6	3	Leszek Wodzyński	Poland	13.72	
7	2	Lubomír Nádeníček	Czechoslovakia	13.76	
8	4	Petr Čech	Czechoslovakia	13.86	
				Wind: +0.3 m/s	
