= 1972 European Athletics Indoor Championships – Men's 50 metres hurdles =

The men's 50 metres hurdles event at the 1972 European Athletics Indoor Championships was held on 12 March in Grenoble.

== Medalists ==
Gold	Silver	Bronze
Guy Drut; France	Manfred Schumann; West Germany	Anatoliy Moshiashvili; Soviet Union

== Results ==
=== Heats ===
First 3 from each heat (Q) qualified directly for the semifinals.

Rank	Heat	Name	Nationality	Time	Notes
1	4	Guy Drut	France	6.53	Q
2	1	Mirosław Wodzyński	Poland	6.61	Q, NR
2	4	Marek Jóźwik	Poland	6.61	Q
4	1	Anatoliy Moshiashvili	Soviet Union	6.65	Q
5	2	Manfred Schumann	West Germany	6.67	Q
5	3	Marc Noé	France	6.67	Q
7	1	Alan Pascoe	Great Britain	6.73	Q
7	3	Aleksandr Morozov	Soviet Union	6.73	Q
9	2	Émile Raybois	France	6.75	Q
10	2	Leszek Wodzyński	Poland	6.75	Q
11	3	Petr Čech	Czechoslovakia	6.78	Q
11	4	Beat Pfister	Switzerland	6.78	Q
13	1	Nicolae Pertea	Romania	6.79	NR
13	4	Werner Eikmeier	West Germany	6.79	
15	3	Efstratios Vasiliou	Greece	6.80	NR
16	3	Giuseppe Buttari	Italy	6.81	
17	3	Graham Gower	Great Britain	6.82	
18	1	Luigi Donofrio	Italy	6.83	
19	2	Krister Clerselius	Sweden	6.84	NR
20	4	Marco Acerbi	Italy	6.86	
21	2	Hubert König	Austria	6.95	
22	2	Berwyn Price	Great Britain	6.97	
22	4	Jesper Tørring	Denmark	6.97	

=== Semifinals ===
First 3 from each heat (Q) qualified directly for the final.

Rank	Heat	Name	Nationality	Time	Notes
1	1	Guy Drut	France	6.52	Q, WB
2	1	Manfred Schumann	West Germany	6.58	Q, NR
3	1	Mirosław Wodzyński	Poland	6.61	Q, =NR
3	2	Marek Jóźwik	Poland	6.61	Q, =NR
3	2	Anatoliy Moshiashvili	Soviet Union	6.61	Q
6	2	Marc Noé	France	6.64	Q, AJR
7	2	Leszek Wodzyński	Poland	6.70	
8	1	Aleksandr Morozov	Soviet Union	6.74	
9	2	Petr Čech	Czechoslovakia	6.80	
10	2	Alan Pascoe	Great Britain	6.83	
11	1	Émile Raybois	France	6.85	
12	1	Beat Pfister	Switzerland	6.91	

=== Final ===
Rank	Name	Nationality	Time	Notes
1st place, gold medalist(s)	Guy Drut	France	6.51	WB
2nd place, silver medalist(s)	Manfred Schumann	West Germany	6.58	NR
3rd place, bronze medalist(s)	Anatoliy Moshiashvili	Soviet Union	6.59	NR
4	Marek Jóźwik	Poland	6.63	
5	Marc Noé	France	6.67	
6	Mirosław Wodzyński	Poland	6.68	
