= 1975 European Athletics Indoor Championships – Men's 60 metres hurdles =

The men's 60 metres hurdles event at the 1975 European Athletics Indoor Championships was held on 9 March in Katowice.

== Medalists ==
Gold	Silver	Bronze
Leszek Wodzyński; Poland	Frank Siebeck; East Germany	Eduard Pereverzev; Soviet Union

== Results ==
=== Heats ===
First 2 from each heat (Q) and the next 4 fastest (q) qualified for the semifinals.

Rank	Heat	Name	Nationality	Time	Notes
1	3	Eduard Pereverzev	Soviet Union	7.75	Q
1	4	Frank Siebeck	East Germany	7.75	Q
3	2	Leszek Wodzyński	Poland	7.76	Q
3	3	Klaus Fiedler	East Germany	7.76	Q
5	4	Mirosław Wodzyński	Poland	7.78	Q
6	4	Viktor Myasnikov	Soviet Union	7.81	q
7	3	Jan Pusty	Poland	7.84	q
8	2	Ervin Sebestyen	Romania	7.86	Q
9	1	Giuseppe Buttari	Italy	7.95	Q
10	1	Anatoliy Moshiashvili	Soviet Union	7.97	Q
11	3	Bruno Dussancourt	France	8.02	q
12	2	Yves Kirpach	Luxembourg	8.06	q
13	2	Jean-Pierre Corval	France	8.07	
14	4	Július Ivan	Czechoslovakia	8.08	
15	3	Loránd Milassin	Hungary	8.10	
16	1	Dieter Gebhard	West Germany	8.11	
17	1	Gerardo Calleja	Spain	8.15	
17	2	Georgios Mandellos	Greece	8.15	
19	1	Efstratios Vasiliou	Greece	8.21	
20	2	Beat Pfister	Switzerland	8.25	
21	1	Jiří Čeřovský	Czechoslovakia	8.29	
22	3	Steen Petersen	Denmark	8.40	
23	4	Nurullah Candan	Turkey	8.70	

=== Semifinals ===
First 2 from each heat (Q) and the next 2 fastest (q) qualified for the final.

Rank	Heat	Name	Nationality	Time	Notes
1	1	Frank Siebeck	East Germany	7.66	Q, CR
2	1	Mirosław Wodzyński	Poland	7.73	Q
3	2	Klaus Fiedler	East Germany	7.75	Q
4	2	Viktor Myasnikov	Soviet Union	7.76	Q
5	1	Eduard Pereverzev	Soviet Union	7.77	q
6	2	Leszek Wodzyński	Poland	7.78	q
7	1	Ervin Sebestyen	Romania	7.80	
8	2	Jan Pusty	Poland	7.85	
9	2	Anatoliy Moshiashvili	Soviet Union	7.87	
10	1	Giuseppe Buttari	Italy	7.95	
11	2	Bruno Dussancourt	France	8.08	
12	1	Yves Kirpach	Luxembourg	8.26	

=== Final ===
Rank	Lane	Name	Nationality	Time	Notes
1st place, gold medalist(s)	6	Leszek Wodzyński	Poland	7.69	
2nd place, silver medalist(s)	2	Frank Siebeck	East Germany	7.69	
3rd place, bronze medalist(s)	1	Eduard Pereverzev	Soviet Union	7.74	
4	4	Klaus Fiedler	East Germany	7.77	
5	3	Mirosław Wodzyński	Poland	7.85	
6	5	Viktor Myasnikov	Soviet Union	8.04	
