= 1974 European Athletics Indoor Championships – Men's 60 metres hurdles =

The men's 60 metres hurdles event at the 1974 European Athletics Indoor Championships was held on 10 March in Gothenburg.

== Medalists ==
Gold	Silver	Bronze
Anatoliy Moshiashvili; Soviet Union	Mirosław Wodzyński; Poland	Frank Siebeck; East Germany

== Results ==
=== Heats ===
First 4 from each heat (Q) qualified directly for the final.

Rank	Heat	Name	Nationality	Time	Notes
1	2	Anatoliy Moshiashvili	Soviet Union	7.75	Q
2	2	Frank Siebeck	East Germany	7.81	Q
3	1	Guy Drut	France	7.87	Q
3	2	Mirosław Wodzyński	Poland	7.87	Q
5	1	Viktor Myasnikov	Soviet Union	7.93	Q
6	1	Leszek Wodzyński	Poland	7.94	Q
7	2	Giuseppe Buttari	Italy	7.98	Q
8	2	Beat Pfister	Switzerland	7.98	
9	2	Yannick Vésin	France	8.00	
10	1	Krister Clerselius	Sweden	8.01	Q
11	1	Vlastimil Hoferek	Czechoslovakia	8.02	
12	1	Günther Nickel	West Germany	8.06	
13	2	Efstratios Vasiliou	Greece	8.08	
14	1	Jorge Zapata	Spain	8.11	
15	2	Petr Čech	Czechoslovakia	8.15	
16	1	Yves Kirpach	Luxembourg	8.33	

=== Final ===
Rank	Name	Nationality	Time	Notes
1st place, gold medalist(s)	Anatoliy Moshiashvili	Soviet Union	7.66	CR
2nd place, silver medalist(s)	Mirosław Wodzyński	Poland	7.68	
3rd place, bronze medalist(s)	Frank Siebeck	East Germany	7.75	
4	Leszek Wodzyński	Poland	7.94	
5	Giuseppe Buttari	Italy	8.01	
6	Krister Clerselius	Sweden	8.05	
7	Viktor Myasnikov	Soviet Union	8.51	
	Guy Drut	France	DNF	
