= Athletics at the 1970 British Commonwealth Games – Men's 110 metres hurdles =

Men's 110 metres hurdles at the 1970 British Commonwealth Games
- Venue: Meadowbank Stadium, Edinburgh
- Dates: 17 and 18 July 1970

Medalists
gold medal	David Hemery	England
silver medal	Malcolm Baird	Australia
bronze medal	Godfrey Murray	Jamaica

The men's 110 metres hurdles event at the 1970 British Commonwealth Games was held on 17 and 18 July at the Meadowbank Stadium in Edinburgh, Scotland. It was the first time that the metric distance was contested at the Games, replacing the 120 yards hurdles.

== Medallists ==
Medallists
Gold	Silver	Bronze
David Hemery; England	Malcolm Baird; Australia	Godfrey Murray; Jamaica

== Results ==
=== Heats ===
==== Qualification for semifinals ====
The first 4 in each heat (Q) and the next 4 fastest (q) qualified for the semifinals.

==== Wind speed ====
Heat 1: +6.8 m/s, Heat 2: ? m/s, Heat 3: ? m/s

Heats results
Rank	Heat	Name	Nationality	Time	Notes
1	1	David Hemery	England	13.73	Q
2	1	Mal Baird	Australia	14.04	Q
3	1	Brian Donnelly	Canada	14.0	Q
4	1	John Akii-Bua	Uganda	14.3	Q
5	1	Alfred Belleh	Nigeria	14.4	q
6	1	Michael Billy-Montague	Trinidad and Tobago	15.2	
7	1	Pierre Jallow	Gambia	16.8	
1	2	Godfrey Murray	Jamaica	14.1	Q
2	2	Stuart Storey	England	14.2	Q
3	2	George Neeland	Canada	14.4	Q
4	2	Alan Murray	Scotland	14.6	Q
5	2	John Kinahan	Northern Ireland	14.9	
6	2	Jean Jatha	Mauritius	15.6	
1	3	Alan Pascoe	England	13.8	Q
2	3	Kwaku Ohene-Frempong	Ghana	14.1	Q
3	3	Adeola Aboyade-Cole	Nigeria	14.3	Q
4	3	Rich McDonald	Canada	14.3	Q
5	3	Charles Kirkpatrick	Northern Ireland	14.6	q
6	3	Alun James	Wales	14.7	q

=== Semifinals ===
Held on 18 July

==== Qualification for final ====
The first 4 in each semifinal (Q) qualified directly for the final.

==== Wind speed ====
Heat 1: +5.4 m/s, Heat 2: ? m/s

Semifinals results
Rank	Heat	Name	Nationality	Time	Notes
1	1	David Hemery	England	13.8	Q
2	1	Mal Baird	Australia	14.02	Q
3	1	Kwaku Ohene-Frempong	Ghana	14.0	Q
4	1	Rich McDonald	Canada	14.2	Q
5	1	Stuart Storey	England	14.25	
6	1	Berwyn Price	Wales	14.4	
7	1	Alfred Belleh	Nigeria	14.4	
8	1	Charles Kirkpatrick	Northern Ireland	14.7	
1	2	Alan Pascoe	England	13.9	Q
2	2	Godfrey Murray	Jamaica	14.0	Q
3	2	Brian Donnelly	Canada	14.1	Q
4	2	George Neeland	Canada	14.2	Q
5	2	John Akii-Bua	Uganda	14.4	
6	2	Adeola Aboyade-Cole	Nigeria	14.7	
7	2	Alan Murray	Scotland	14.7	
8	2	Alun James	Wales	14.9	

=== Final ===
Held on 18 July

==== Wind speed ====
+2.9 m/s

Final results
Rank	Lane	Name	Nationality	Time	Notes
1st place, gold medalist(s)	1	David Hemery	England	13.66	
2nd place, silver medalist(s)	4	Mal Baird	Australia	13.86	
3rd place, bronze medalist(s)	3	Godfrey Murray	Jamaica	14.02	
4	5	George Neeland	Canada	14.2	
5	7	Brian Donnelly	Canada	14.2	
6	2	Rich McDonald	Canada	14.4	
7	6	Kwaku Ohene-Frempong	Ghana	14.7	
	8	Alan Pascoe	England	DNF	
