= 1971 European Athletics Championships – Men's 110 metres hurdles =

Men's 110 metres hurdles at the European Athletics Championships

The men's 110 metres hurdles at the 1971 European Athletics Championships was held in Helsinki, Finland, at Helsinki Olympic Stadium on 13, 14, and 15 August 1971.

== Medalists ==
Gold	Frank Siebeck; East Germany
Silver	Alan Pascoe; Great Britain
Bronze	Lubomír Nádeníček; Czechoslovakia

== Results ==
=== Final ===
15 August Wind: -2.5 m/s

Rank	Name	Nationality	Time	Notes
1st place, gold medalist(s)	Frank Siebeck	East Germany	14.00	
2nd place, silver medalist(s)	Alan Pascoe	Great Britain	14.09	
3rd place, bronze medalist(s)	Lubomír Nádeníček	Czechoslovakia	14.31	
4	Anatoliy Moshiashvili	Soviet Union	14.36	
5	Leszek Wodzyński	Poland	14.37	
6	Sergio Liani	Italy	14.40	
7	Marek Jóźwik	Poland	14.54	
8	Mirosław Wodzyński	Poland	14.78	

=== Semi-finals ===
14 August

==== Semi-final 1 ====
Wind: -0.8 m/s

Rank	Name	Nationality	Time	Notes
1	Lubomír Nádeníček	Czechoslovakia	14.02	Q
2	Leszek Wodzyński	Poland	14.05	Q
3	Anatoliy Moshiashvili	Soviet Union	14.10	Q
4	Mirosław Wodzyński	Poland	14.19	Q
5	Patrick Malrieux	France	14.28	
6	Manfred Schumann	West Germany	14.52	
7	Viorel Suciu	Romania	14.55	
8	Ragnar Moland	Norway	14.68	

==== Semi-final 2 ====
Wind: -2.5 m/s

Rank	Name	Nationality	Time	Notes
1	Frank Siebeck	East Germany	14.00	Q
2	Alan Pascoe	Great Britain	14.10	Q
3	Sergio Liani	Italy	14.13	Q
4	Marek Jóźwik	Poland	14.30	Q
5	Günther Nickel	West Germany	14.31	
6	Håkon Fimland	Norway	14.41	
7	Lorand Milassin	Hungary	14.54	
8	František Slavotínek	Czechoslovakia	14.83	

=== Heats ===
13 August

==== Heat 1 ====
Wind: -1.3 m/s

Rank	Name	Nationality	Time	Notes
1	Sergio Liani	Italy	14.10	Q
2	Anatoliy Moshiashvili	Soviet Union	14.23	Q
3	Viorel Suciu	Romania	14.51	Q
4	Ragnar Moland	Norway	14.57	Q
5	Berwyn Price	Great Britain	14.57	
6	Daniel Riedo	Switzerland	14.86	
	Guy Drut	France	DNF	

==== Heat 2 ====
Wind: -0.7 m/s

Rank	Name	Nationality	Time	Notes
1	Lubomír Nádeníček	Czechoslovakia	13.98	Q
2	Marek Jóźwik	Poland	14.08	Q
3	Manfred Schumann	West Germany	14.33	Q
4	Lorand Milassin	Hungary	14.34	Q
5	Kenth Olsson	Sweden	14.37	

==== Heat 3 ====
Wind: -4.2 m/s

Rank	Name	Nationality	Time	Notes
1	Mirosław Wodzyński	Poland	14.14	Q
2	Günther Nickel	West Germany	14.33	Q
3	Håkon Fimland	Norway	14.42	Q
4	František Slavotínek	Czechoslovakia	14.60	Q
5	Jesper Tørring	Denmark	14.70	
6	Luigi Donofrio	Italy	14.95	

==== Heat 4 ====
Wind: -2.1 m/s

Rank	Name	Nationality	Time	Notes
1	Frank Siebeck	East Germany	13.97	Q
2	Leszek Wodzyński	Poland	14.01	Q
3	Alan Pascoe	Great Britain	14.09	Q
4	Patrick Malrieux	France	14.15	Q
5	Marco Acerbi	Italy	14.56	
6	Dragan Stoicevic	Yugoslavia	14.67	

== Participation ==
According to an unofficial count, 24 athletes from 15 countries participated in the event.

- Denmark (1)
- Czechoslovakia (2)
- East Germany (1)
- France (2)
- Hungary (1)
- Italy (3)
- Norway (2)
- Poland (3)
- Romania (1)
- Soviet Union (1)
- Sweden (1)
- Switzerland (1)
- Great Britain (2)
- West Germany (2)
- Yugoslavia (1)
