= Athletics at the 1973 Summer Universiade – Men's 110 metres hurdles =

The men's 110 metres hurdles event at the 1973 Summer Universiade was held at the Central Lenin Stadium in Moscow on 16, 17 and 18 August.

== Medalists ==
Gold	Silver	Bronze
Berwyn Price; Great Britain	Anatoliy Moshiashvili; Soviet Union	Thomas Munkelt; East Germany

== Results ==
=== Heats ===
Wind: Heat 3: +0.2 m/s

Rank	Heat	Athlete	Nationality	Time	Notes
1	1	Berwyn Price	Great Britain	13.98	Q
2	1	Marco Acerbi	Italy	14.26	Q
3	1	Ervin Sebestyen	Romania	14.44	q
4	1	Pauli Pursiainen	Finland	14.46	q
5	1	Beat Pfister	Switzerland	14.47	q
1	2	Thomas Munkelt	East Germany	14.05	Q
2	2	Anatoliy Moshiashvili	Soviet Union	14.26	Q
3	2	Vlastimil Hoferek	Czechoslovakia	14.58	q
4	2	Guillermo Núñez	Cuba	14.62	q
5	2	C.J. Kirkpatrick	Great Britain	14.7	
6	2	David Jarvis	Canada	15.2	
1	3	Viktor Myasnikov	Soviet Union	13.92	Q
2	3	Raimund Bethge	East Germany	14.24	Q
3	3	Daniel Marty	France	14.65	
4	3	Ryszard Skowronek	Poland	14.72	
5	3	Márcio Lomónaco	Brazil	14.8	
1	4	Larry Shipp	United States	14.3	Q
2	4	Przemysław Siciński	Poland	14.46	Q
3	4	Slavcho Dimitrov	Bulgaria	15.1	
4	4	Abdelkader Boudjéma	Algeria	15.6	
5	4	Dorival Negrissoli	Brazil	16.4	
1	5	Juan Morales	Cuba	14.21	Q
2	5	Eckart Berkes	West Germany	14.41	Q
3	5	László Bognár	Hungary	14.50	q
4	5	Gianni Ronconi	Italy	14.67	

=== Semifinals ===
Rank	Heat	Athlete	Nationality	Time	Notes
1	1	Viktor Myasnikov	Soviet Union	13.88	Q
2	1	Juan Morales	Cuba	14.15	Q
3	1	Marco Acerbi	Italy	14.18	Q
4	1	Ervin Sebestyen	Romania	14.38	
5	1	Raimund Bethge	East Germany	14.40	
6	1	Pauli Pursiainen	Finland	14.52	
7	1	Beat Pfister	Switzerland	14.55	
8	1	László Bognár	Hungary	14.55	
1	2	Thomas Munkelt	East Germany	13.89	Q
2	2	Anatoliy Moshiashvili	Soviet Union	13.92	Q
3	2	Berwyn Price	Great Britain	13.95	Q
4	2	Larry Shipp	United States	14.26	q
5	2	Guillermo Núñez	Cuba	14.33	q
6	2	Eckart Berkes	West Germany	14.50	
7	2	Vlastimil Hoferek	Czechoslovakia	14.51	
8	2	Przemysław Siciński	Poland	14.84	

=== Final ===
Wind: 0.0 m/s

Rank	Athlete	Nationality	Time	Notes
1st place, gold medalist(s)	Berwyn Price	Great Britain	13.69	
2nd place, silver medalist(s)	Anatoliy Moshiashvili	Soviet Union	13.73	NR
3rd place, bronze medalist(s)	Thomas Munkelt	East Germany	13.80	
4	Viktor Myasnikov	Soviet Union	13.86	
5	Larry Shipp	United States	13.98	
6	Juan Morales	Cuba	14.08	
7	Raimund Bethge	East Germany	14.21	
8	Guillermo Núñez	Cuba	14.39	
