= 1974 European Athletics Championships – Men's 110 metres hurdles =

Men's 110 metres hurdles at the European Athletics Championships

The men's 110 metres hurdles at the 1974 European Athletics Championships was held in Rome, Italy, at Stadio Olimpico on 6, 7, and 8 September 1974.

== Medalists ==
| Gold | Guy Drut; France |
| Silver | Mirosław Wodzyński; Poland |
| Bronze | Leszek Wodzyński; Poland |

== Results ==
=== Final ===
8 September Wind: 0.5 m/s

| Rank | Lane | Name | Nationality | Time | Notes |
|---|---|---|---|---|---|
| 1st place, gold medalist(s) | 6 | Guy Drut | France | 13.40 | CR |
| 2nd place, silver medalist(s) | 3 | Mirosław Wodzyński | Poland | 13.67 | |
| 3rd place, bronze medalist(s) | 7 | Leszek Wodzyński | Poland | 13.71 | |
| 4 | 4 | Thomas Munkelt | East Germany | 13.72 | |
| 5 | 5 | Giuseppe Buttari | Italy | 13.85 | |
| 6 | 2 | Klaus Fiedler | East Germany | 13.96 | |
| 7 | 8 | Berwyn Price | Great Britain | 14.05 | |
| 8 | 1 | Frank Siebeck | East Germany | 14.79 | |

=== Semi-finals ===
7 September

==== Semi-final 1 ====
Wind: 2.5 m/s

| Rank | Name | Nationality | Time | Notes |
|---|---|---|---|---|
| 1 | Mirosław Wodzyński | Poland | 13.59 w | Q |
| 2 | Giuseppe Buttari | Italy | 13.64 w | Q |
| 3 | Berwyn Price | Great Britain | 13.78 w | Q |
| 4 | Thomas Munkelt | East Germany | 13.83 w | Q |
| 5 | Ervin Sebestyen | Romania | 13.91 w | |
| 6 | Petr Čech | Czechoslovakia | 14.07 w | |
| 7 | Viktor Myasnikov | Soviet Union | 14.19 w | |
| 8 | Lubomír Nádeníček | Czechoslovakia | 14.38 w | |

==== Semi-final 2 ====
Wind: 2.4 m/s

| Rank | Name | Nationality | Time | Notes |
|---|---|---|---|---|
| 1 | Guy Drut | France | 13.46 w | Q |
| 2 | Frank Siebeck | East Germany | 13.46 w | Q |
| 3 | Leszek Wodzynski | Poland | 13.61 w | Q |
| 4 | Klaus Fiedler | East Germany | 13.64 w | Q |
| 5 | Przemysław Siciński | Poland | 13.77 w | |
| 6 | Vlastimil Hoferek | Czechoslovakia | 13.89 w | |
| 7 | Manfred Schumann | West Germany | 14.04 w | |
| 8 | Eduard Pereverzev | Soviet Union | 14.21 w | |

=== Heats ===
6 September

==== Heat 1 ====
Wind: -1.0 m/s

| Rank | Name | Nationality | Time | Notes |
|---|---|---|---|---|
| 1 | Guy Drut | France | 13.82 | Q |
| 2 | Frank Siebeck | East Germany | 13.93 | Q |
| 3 | Przemysław Siciński | Poland | 13.99 | Q |
| 4 | Ervin Sebestyen | Romania | 14.14 | Q |
| 5 | Vlastimil Hoferek | Czechoslovakia | 14.25 | q |
| 6 | Berwyn Price | Great Britain | 14.28 | q |
| 7 | Sergio Catasta | Italy | 14.40 | |
| 8 | Gerardo Calleja | Spain | 14.54 | |

==== Heat 2 ====
Wind: 2.5 m/s

| Rank | Name | Nationality | Time | Notes |
|---|---|---|---|---|
| 1 | Viktor Myasnikov | Soviet Union | 14.08 w | Q |
| 2 | Leszek Wodzyński | Poland | 14.13 w | Q |
| 3 | Klaus Fiedler | East Germany | 14.19 w | Q |
| 4 | Manfred Schumann | West Germany | 14.31 w | Q |
| 5 | Lubomír Nádeníček | Czechoslovakia | 14.34 w | q |
| 6 | Sergio Liani | Italy | 14.43 w | |
| 7 | Juan Lloveras | Spain | 14.60 w | |
| 8 | Yves Kirpach | Luxembourg | 14.63 w | |

==== Heat 3 ====
Wind: -1.2 m/s

| Rank | Name | Nationality | Time | Notes |
|---|---|---|---|---|
| 1 | Mirosław Wodzyński | Poland | 13.84 | Q |
| 2 | Thomas Munkelt | East Germany | 13.92 | Q |
| 3 | Eduard Pereverzev | Soviet Union | 13.96 | Q |
| 4 | Giuseppe Buttari | Italy | 13.98 | Q |
| 5 | Petr Čech | Czechoslovakia | 14.06 | q |
| 6 | Efstratios Vasiliou | Greece | 14.37 | |
| 7 | Krister Clerselius | Sweden | 14.98 | |

== Participation ==
According to an unofficial count, 23 athletes from 13 countries participated in the event.

- Czechoslovakia (3)
- East Germany (3)
- France (1)
- Greece (1)
- Italy (3)
- Luxembourg (1)
- Poland (3)
- Romania (1)
- Soviet Union (2)
- Spain (2)
- Sweden (1)
- Great Britain (1)
- West Germany (1)
