= Adam Galant =

Polish hurdler (1954–2025)

Personal information
- Born: 23 January 1954
- Died: On or before 1 December 2025 (aged 73)

Sport
- Country: Poland
- Sport: Athletics
- Events: 60 metres hurdles 110 metres hurdles

Achievements and titles
- Personal bests: 60 m hurdles: 7.57 WR (1973); 110 m hurdles: 13.66 (1972)
Medal record
Men's athletics
Representing the Poland
European Indoor Championships
Silver medal – second place	1973 Rotterdam	60 m hurdles

Adam Galant (21 February 1952 – on or before 1 December 2025) was a Polish hurdler. He won the silver medal in the 60 metres hurdles at the 1973 European Athletics Indoor Championships. On 25 February 1973, he ran 7.57 seconds over 60 m hurdles to win the Polish Indoor Athletics Championships, setting a world record over the distance.

== Career ==
Galant ran for the athletics section of the Górnik Wałbrzych club beginning in 1971. He advanced past the heats of the 60 metres hurdles at the 1971 European Indoor Championships, but placed 4th in his semi-final and did make the finals. Outdoors, he placed 5th at the 1971 Janusz Kusociński Memorial and 3rd at a later meeting in Warsaw over 110 m hurdles.

Galant ran 13.6 seconds to place runner-up in his heat at the 1972 Polish Athletics Championships. In the finals, he tied Leszek Wodzyński for the win as both were assigned a time of 13.4 seconds, surpassing Marek Jóźwik's Polish national record. At the 1972 Polish Olympic trials, Galant ultimately finished 4th and was not selected for the team.

On 25 February 1973 at the Polish Indoor Athletics Championships, he won the 60 m hurdles in 7.57 seconds, setting a world record for automatic timing (superseding Ervin Hall and Günther Nickel's 7.6 hand-timed bests). At the 1973 European Athletics Indoor Championships, Galant won his heat and semi-final to advance to the finals, where he ran 7.76 seconds behind only Frank Siebeck. Outdoors, he won the sprint hurdles at a race in Havana, Cuba in May 1973. He got injured participating in the long jump at a league competition in Kraków, cutting his outdoor season short.

Galant's 1974 season was hampered by injuries. He did not record performances in 1975.

In 1976, Galant reached the 60 m hurdles semi-finals at the 1976 European Indoor Championships but did not advance to the finals. He retired in 1979.

== Personal life ==
Galant was born in Węgliniec, Lower Silesian Voivodeship, Poland. He graduated from the Warsaw University of Technology.

Galant was coached by Andrzej Radiuk. His coach said that he observed Galant had an unusually large number of fast twitch muscle fibers and could have broken the 110 metres hurdles world record had he not been injured.

Galant's death was announced by the Polish Athletic Association before 2 December 2025. He was 73 years old at the time of his death.

Węgliniec's municipal stadium, Stadion Miejski w Węglińcu im. Adama Galanta, was named after Galant.
