= 1971 European Athletics Indoor Championships – Men's 60 metres hurdles =

The men's 60 metres hurdles event at the 1971 European Athletics Indoor Championships was held on 14 March in Sofia.

== Medalists ==
Gold	Silver	Bronze
Eckart Berkes; West Germany	Aleksandr Demus; Soviet Union	Sergio Liani; Italy

== Results ==
=== Heats ===
First 3 from each heat (Q) qualified directly for the semifinals.

Rank	Heat	Name	Nationality	Time	Notes
1	1	Aleksandr Demus	Soviet Union	8.0	Q
2	1	Jürgen Wehnert	East Germany	8.0	Q
3	1	Luigi Donofrio	Italy	8.1	Q
4	1	Viorel Suciu	Romania	8.2	
5	1	Ivan Sedláček	Czechoslovakia	8.3	
1	2	Eckart Berkes	West Germany	8.0	Q
2	2	Mirosław Majchrzak	Poland	8.1	Q
3	2	Slavcho Kostov	Bulgaria	8.1	Q
4	2	Nicolae Pertea	Romania	8.1	
5	2	Fiorenzo Marchesi	Switzerland	8.5	
1	3	Patrick Malrieux	France	8.0	Q
2	3	Manfred Schumann	West Germany	8.1	Q
3	3	Adam Galant	Poland	8.2	Q
4	3	Rafael Cano	Spain	8.4	
5	3	Ervin Sebestyen	Romania	8.4	
1	4	Günther Nickel	West Germany	8.0	Q
2	4	Graham Gower	Great Britain	8.0	Q
3	4	Sergio Liani	Italy	8.0	Q
4	4	Efstratios Vasiliou	Greece	8.1	

=== Semifinals ===
First 3 from each heat (Q) qualified directly for the final.

Rank	Heat	Name	Nationality	Time	Notes
1	1	Eckart Berkes	West Germany	8.0	Q
2	1	Patrick Malrieux	France	8.0	Q
3	1	Sergio Liani	Italy	8.1	Q
4	1	Adam Galant	Poland	8.1	
5	1	Manfred Schumann	West Germany	8.1	
6	1	Slavcho Kostov	Bulgaria	8.3	
1	2	Günther Nickel	West Germany	7.9	Q
2	2	Aleksandr Demus	Soviet Union	8.0	Q
3	2	Graham Gower	Great Britain	8.0	Q
4	2	Luigi Donofrio	Italy	8.0	
5	2	Jürgen Wehnert	East Germany	8.0	
6	2	Mirosław Majchrzak	Poland	8.0	

=== Final ===
Rank	Name	Nationality	Time	Notes
1st place, gold medalist(s)	Eckart Berkes	West Germany	7.8	
2nd place, silver medalist(s)	Aleksandr Demus	Soviet Union	7.9	
3rd place, bronze medalist(s)	Sergio Liani	Italy	7.9	
4	Günther Nickel	West Germany	7.9	
5	Graham Gower	Great Britain	8.0	
6	Patrick Malrieux	France	8.0	
