= 1970 European Athletics Indoor Championships – Men's 60 metres hurdles =

The men's 60 metres hurdles event at the 1970 European Athletics Indoor Championships was held on 15 March in Vienna.

== Medalists ==
Gold	Silver	Bronze
Günther Nickel; West Germany	Frank Siebeck; East Germany	Guy Drut; France

== Results ==
=== Heats ===
First 4 from each heat (Q) qualified directly for the semifinals.

Rank	Heat	Name	Nationality	Time	Notes
1	1	Werner Trzmiel	West Germany	8.1	Q
2	1	Loránd Milassin	Hungary	8.1	Q
3	1	Leszek Wodzyński	Poland	8.2	Q
4	1	Alan Pascoe	Great Britain	8.4	Q
5	1	Nurullah Candan	Turkey	8.8	
1	2	Guy Drut	France	7.9	Q
2	2	Frank Siebeck	East Germany	7.9	Q
3	2	Günther Nickel	West Germany	8.0	Q
4	2	Nicolae Pertea	Romania	8.1	Q
5	2	Sergio Liani	Italy	8.2	
6	2	Dušan Bizjak	Yugoslavia	8.2	
1	3	Aleksandr Demus	Soviet Union	7.9	Q
2	3	Raimund Bethge	East Germany	8.1	Q
3	3	Ragnar Moland	Norway	8.2	Q
4	3	Ivan Sedláček	Czechoslovakia	8.2	Q
5	3	Helmut Haid	Austria	8.3	

=== Semifinals ===
First 3 from each heat (Q) qualified directly for the final.

Rank	Heat	Name	Nationality	Time	Notes
1	1	Günther Nickel	West Germany	7.8	Q
2	1	Raimund Bethge	East Germany	7.8	Q
3	1	Guy Drut	France	7.9	Q
4	1	Nicolae Pertea	Romania	7.9	
5	1	Ivan Sedláček	Czechoslovakia	7.9	
6	1	Loránd Milassin	Hungary	8.3	
1	2	Aleksandr Demus	Soviet Union	7.8	Q
2	2	Frank Siebeck	East Germany	7.8	Q
3	2	Werner Trzmiel	West Germany	8.0	Q
4	2	Leszek Wodzyński	Poland	8.1	
5	2	Ragnar Moland	Norway	8.1	
6	2	Alan Pascoe	Great Britain	8.2	

=== Final ===
Rank	Lane	Name	Nationality	Time	Notes
1st place, gold medalist(s)	2	Günther Nickel	West Germany	7.8	
2nd place, silver medalist(s)	6	Frank Siebeck	East Germany	7.8	
3rd place, bronze medalist(s)	5	Guy Drut	France	7.8	
4	1	Werner Trzmiel	West Germany	7.9	
5	3	Raimund Bethge	East Germany	7.9	
6	4	Aleksandr Demus	Soviet Union	8.0	
