= 1969 European Indoor Games – Men's 50 metres hurdles =

Hurdles Sport for Men

The men's 50 metres hurdles event at the 1969 European Indoor Games was held on 9 March in Belgrade.

== Medalists ==
Gold	Silver	Bronze
Alan Pascoe; Great Britain	Werner Trzmiel; West Germany	Nicolae Pertea; Romania

== Results ==
=== Heats ===
First 2 from each heat (Q) and the next 1 fastest (q) qualified for the final.

Rank	Heat	Name	Nationality	Time	Notes
1	1	Werner Trzmiel	West Germany	6.7	Q
2	1	Raimund Bethge	East Germany	6.8	Q
3	1	Sergio Liani	Italy	6.8	q
4	1	Béla Mélykúti	Hungary	6.9	
5	1	Fiorenzo Marchesi	Switzerland	7.2	
1	2	Günther Nickel	West Germany	6.8	Q
2	2	Nicolae Pertea	Romania	6.9	Q
3	2	František Slavotínek	Czechoslovakia	7.0	
4	2	Slavcho Kostov	Bulgaria	7.1	
5	2	Pierre Schoebel	France	7.3	
1	3	Alan Pascoe	Great Britain	6.8	Q
2	3	Oleg Stepanenko	Soviet Union	6.9	Q
3	3	Leszek Wodzyński	Poland	7.1	
	3	Zdravko Salinger	Yugoslavia	DQ	

=== Final ===
Rank	Name	Nationality	Time	Notes
1st place, gold medalist(s)	Alan Pascoe	Great Britain	6.6	
2nd place, silver medalist(s)	Werner Trzmiel	West Germany	6.6	
3rd place, bronze medalist(s)	Nicolae Pertea	Romania	6.7	
4	Sergio Liani	Italy	6.8	
5	Raimund Bethge	East Germany	6.8	
6	Günther Nickel	West Germany	6.9	
7	Oleg Stepanenko	Soviet Union	6.9	
