= 1976 European Athletics Indoor Championships – Men's 60 metres hurdles =

The men's 60 metres hurdles event at the 1976 European Athletics Indoor Championships was held on 22 February in Munich.

== Medalists ==
Gold	Silver	Bronze
Viktor Myasnikov; Soviet Union	Berwyn Price; Great Britain	Zbigniew Jankowski; Poland

== Results ==
=== Heats ===
First 3 from each heat (Q) qualified directly for the semifinals.

Rank	Heat	Name	Nationality	Time	Notes
1	1	Viktor Myasnikov	Soviet Union	7.86	Q
2	4	Zbigniew Jankowski	Poland	7.95	Q
3	4	Berwyn Price	Great Britain	7.97	Q
4	3	Eduard Pereverzev	Soviet Union	8.00	Q
5	4	Arto Bryggare	Finland	8.01	Q
6	3	Georgios Mandellos	Greece	8.05	Q
7	1	László Bognár	Hungary	8.06	Q
8	1	Andrzej Ziółkowski	Poland	8.08	Q
8	2	Jiří Čeřovský	Czechoslovakia	8.08	Q
10	2	Adam Galant	Poland	8.09	Q
11	2	Jorge Zapata	Spain	8.10	Q
11	2	Thierry Sellier	France	8.10	
11	3	Slavcho Kostov	Bulgaria	8.10	Q
11	4	Lubomír Nádeníček	Czechoslovakia	8.10	
15	1	Jean-Pierre Corval	France	8.14	
15	3	Guido Kratschmer	West Germany	8.14	
15	4	Dragan Stojićević	Yugoslavia	8.14	
	2	Roberto Schneider	Switzerland	DNF	

=== Semifinals ===
First 3 from each heat (Q) qualified directly for the final.

Rank	Heat	Name	Nationality	Time	Notes
1	1	Viktor Myasnikov	Soviet Union	7.87	Q
2	1	Berwyn Price	Great Britain	7.91	Q
3	2	Zbigniew Jankowski	Poland	7.97	Q
4	2	Eduard Pereverzev	Soviet Union	8.00	Q
5	1	László Bognár	Hungary	8.02	Q
6	1	Jorge Zapata	Spain	8.03	
7	1	Georgios Mandellos	Greece	8.03	
8	1	Adam Galant	Poland	8.05	
8	2	Jiří Čeřovský	Czechoslovakia	8.05	Q
10	2	Arto Bryggare	Finland	8.09	
11	2	Andrzej Ziółkowski	Poland	8.17	
12	2	Slavcho Kostov	Bulgaria	8.29	

=== Final ===
Rank	Lane	Name	Nationality	Time	Notes
1st place, gold medalist(s)	3	Viktor Myasnikov	Soviet Union	7.78	
2nd place, silver medalist(s)	4	Berwyn Price	Great Britain	7.80	
3rd place, bronze medalist(s)	2	Zbigniew Jankowski	Poland	7.92	
4	5	Jiří Čeřovský	Czechoslovakia	7.97	
5	1	Eduard Pereverzev	Soviet Union	8.00	
6	6	László Bognár	Hungary	8.02	
