= 1968 European Junior Games =

- Level: Under 20
- Events: 33

The 1968 European Junior Games was the third edition of the biennial athletics competition for European athletes aged under twenty. It was the final edition of the competition under that name and was succeeded by the European Athletics Junior Championships in 1970. The event was held in Leipzig, East Germany, between 23 and 25 August. The competition was mainly between Eastern European countries, with Belgium, Austria, Netherlands and Greece being present from the west.

== Men's results ==
| Event | Gold | | Silver | | Bronze | |
|---|---|---|---|---|---|---|
| 100 metres | Valeriy Borzov (URS) | 10.4 | Tamás Szabó (ROM) | 10.5 | Aleksandr Kornelyuk (URS) | 10.6 |
| 200 metres | Valeriy Borzov (URS) | 21.0 | Mikhail Lebedev (URS) | 21.5 | Michel Mahy (BEL) | 21.7 |
| 400 metres | Michel Mahy (BEL) | 47.5 | Aleksandr Kucheryavy (URS) | 47.9 | Vladimir Nosenko (URS) | 48.2 |
| 800 metres | Reinhard Dominik (GDR) | 1:51.6 | Anatoliy Goncharov (URS) | 1:52.2 | Krzysztof Linkowski (POL) | 1:52.4 |
| 1500 metres | Uwe Schneider (GDR) | 3:53.3 | Bernd Exner (GDR) | 3:54.0 | Milisav Andelov (YUG) | 3:54.6 |
| 3000 metres | Ion Dima (ROM) | 8:13.4 | Wilfried Scholz (GDR) | 8:15.6 | Viktor Kuznetsov (URS) | 8:18.0 |
| 110 m hurdles | Yevgeniy Mazepa (URS) | 14.3 | Frank Siebeck (GDR) | 14.5 | Anatoliy Moshiashvili (URS) | 14.7 |
| 400 m hurdles | Yevgeniy Gavrilenko (URS) | 51.6 | Michael Schulze (GDR) | 53.1 | Dmitriy Stukalov (URS) | 53.2 |
| 1500 m s'chase | Nikolay Bakhlanov (URS) | 4:05.0 | Petre Lupan (ROM) | 4:05.0 | Petko Georgiev (BUL) | 4:05.2 |
| 10,000 m walk | Joachim Dumke (GDR) | 44:48.0 | Frank Donner (GDR) | 44:50.0 | Algis Lebedzhus (URS) | 45:31.6 |
| 4 × 100 m relay | Soviet Union (URS); Aleksandr Kornelyuk; Mikhail Lebedev; Valeriy Borzov; Sergey Korovin | 40.4 | East Germany (GDR); Jürgen Rutz; Horst Hauptmann; Gerhard Lühnenschloss; Detlev Beckmann | 41.3 | Poland (POL); Witold Fortuniak; Mirosław Muzolf; Wiktor Godlewski; Bogdan Grzejszczak | 41.8 |
| 4 × 400 m relay | Soviet Union (URS); Vladimir Volchok; Yevgeniy Skakun; Vladimir Nosenko; Aleksandr Kucheryavy | 3:12.3 | East Germany (GDR); Jürgen Laser; Lothar Krohn; Andreas Scheibe; Detlef Lindner | 3:12.6 | Poland (POL); Jan Pech; Krzysztof Linkowski; Wojciech Brociak; Krzysztof Miros | 3:16.0 |
| Pole vault | Yury Isakov (URS) | 4.70 | Vladimir Kishkun (URS) | 4.60 | Pawel Iwiński (POL) | 4.40 |
| High jump | Aleksandr Shigin (URS) | 2.10 | Ioánnis Kousoulas (GRE) | 2.10 | Rustam Akhmetov (URS) | 2.04 |
| Long jump | Mikhail Bariban (URS) | 7.78 | Ulrich Lampe (GDR) | 7.44 | Laimonis Magone (URS) | 7.44 |
| Triple jump | Mikhail Bariban (URS) | 15.94 | Stanislav Kolesnikov (URS) | 15.46 w | Andreas Baraktiaris (GRE) | 15.36 |
| Shot put | Hartmut Briesenick (GDR) | 18.71 | Peter Hlawatschke (GDR) | 17.02 | Arûnas Vaitkevicius (URS) | 16.90 |
| Discus throw | Hans-Jürgen Jacobi (GDR) | 54.22 | Viktor Zhurba (URS) | 51.64 | Hartmut Briesenick (GDR) | 49.20 |
| Javelin throw (old model) | Andrzej Szajda (POL) | 68.52 | Jonas Dobrila (URS) | 68.36 | Edmund Berdziński (POL) | 68.02 |
| Hammer throw | Peter Przesdzing (GDR) | 61.76 | Vladimir Tretyak (URS) | 61.32 | Igor Sovpel (URS) | 59.08 |
| Decathlon | Leonid Lytvynenko (URS) | 7434 | Stefan Junge (GDR) | 7319 | Manfred Apt (GDR) | 7012 |

== Women's results ==
| Event | Gold | | Silver | | Bronze | |
|---|---|---|---|---|---|---|
| 100 metres | Lyudmila Zharkova (URS) | 11.5 | Renate Meissner (GDR) | 11.6 | Mariana Goth (ROM) | 11.6 |
| 200 metres | Lyudmila Zharkova (URS) | 23.9 | Renate Meissner (GDR) | 23.9 | Mariana Goth (ROM) | 24.0 |
| 400 metres | Waltraud Birnbaum (GDR) | 54.0 | Raisa Nikanorova (URS) | 54.4 | Mariana Filip (ROM) | 55.4 |
| 800 metres | Barbara Wieck (GDR) | 2:06.3 | Waltraud Pöhland (GDR) | 2:07.7 | Nijole Sabaite (URS) | 2:10.1 |
| 80 m hurdles | Anneliese Jahns (GDR) | 11.1 | Emina Pilav (YUG) | 11.2 | Ewa Balcerzyk (POL) | 11.2 |
| 4 × 100 m relay | Soviet Union (URS); Raisa Nikanorova; Nadezhda Besfamilnaya; Marina Nikiforova; Lyudmila Zharkova | 45.3 | East Germany (GDR); Bärbel Schrickel; Renate Meissner; Marion Wagner; Gabriele Zindler | 45.8 | Poland (POL); Krystyna Mandecka; Urszula Soszka; Danuta Kopa; Elżbieta Nowak | 46.6 |
| High jump | Elke Kalliwoda (GDR) | 1.72 | Nina Brintseva (URS) | 1.72 | Katya Lazova (BUL) | 1.72 |
| Long jump | Tatyana Bychkova (URS) | 6.18 | Natalya Kostugina (URS) | 6.15 | Kristina Ziegler (GDR) | 6.07 |
| Shot put | Elvira Syromyatnikova (URS) | 15.02 | Leana Matthes (GDR) | 13.60 | Dora Topuskova (BUL) | 13.59 |
| Discus throw | Svetlana Vedeneyeva (URS) | 45.94 | Svetla Bozhkova (BUL) | 45.46 | Jutta Knobloch (GDR) | 45.08 |
| Javelin throw (old model) | Serafina Moritz (ROM) | 51.10 | Cecylia Bajer (POL) | 50.78 | Marion Steiner (GDR) | 48.72 |
| Pentathlon | Burglinde Pollak (GDR) | 4717 | Tatyana Bychkova (URS) | 4582 | Cornelia Popescu (ROM) | 4460 |

== Medal table ==
| Rank | Nation | Gold | Silver | Bronze | Total |
|---|---|---|---|---|---|
| 1 | Soviet Union (URS) | 18 | 12 | 11 | 41 |
| 2 | East Germany (GDR) | 11 | 15 | 5 | 31 |
| 3 | Romania (ROM) | 2 | 2 | 4 | 8 |
| 4 | Poland (POL) | 1 | 1 | 7 | 9 |
| 5 | Belgium (BEL) | 1 | 0 | 1 | 2 |
| 6 | Bulgaria (BUL) | 0 | 1 | 3 | 4 |
| 7 | Greece (GRE) | 0 | 1 | 1 | 2 |
| 7 | Yugoslavia (YUG) | 0 | 1 | 1 | 2 |
| Totals (8 entries) | | 33 | 33 | 33 | 99 |

== Participation ==
- Albania
- Austria
- Belgium
- Bulgaria
- East Germany
- Greece
- Netherlands
- Poland
- Romania
- Soviet Union
- Turkey
- Yugoslavia
