= Wodzyński =

Wodzyński (feminine: Wodzyńska; plural: Wodzyńscy) is a Polish surname. Notable people with the surname include:

- Leszek Wodzyński (1946–1999), Polish hurdler
- Mirosław Wodzyński (born 1951), Polish hurdler, brother of Leszek
