= 60 metres hurdles world record progression =

The world record for the 60 metres hurdles is recognised by World Athletics, the governing body for the sport of athletics, for both men and women. The event is recognised in indoor settings only. The current men's record is 7.27 A seconds, set by the USA's Grant Holloway on 16 February 2024 in Albuquerque. The current women's record is held by The Bahamas’s Devynne Charlton, who ran 7.65 seconds in Glasgow on 3 March 2024 and in Toruń on 22 March 2026.

The governing body have officially ratified world indoor records since 1 January 1987. Previous to this, they were regarded as world indoor bests; as such, the existing world indoor bests were deemed to be the inaugural world indoor records.

== Men ==
IAAF ratified bests (1966–1986)
Time	Athlete	Date	Place
7.8	Marcel Duriez (FRA)	11 March 1966	Paris
7.8	Viktor Balikhin (SOV)	12 March 1966	Brest
7.8	Eddy Ottoz (ITA)	27 March 1966	Westfalenhalle
7.7	Eddy Ottoz (ITA)	27 March 1966	Westfalenhalle
7.7	Eddy Ottoz (ITA)	27 March 1966	Westfalenhalle
7.7	Valentin Chistyakov (URS)	29 January 1967	Moscow
7.7	Ervin Hall (USA)	17 November 1968	Berlin
7.6	Ervin Hall (USA)	17 November 1968	Berlin
7.6	Gunther Nickel (FRG)	31 January 1970	Mainz
7.57	Adam Galant (POL)	25 February 1973	Zabrze
7.54	Yuriy Chervanyov (URS)	2 March 1980	Sindelfingen
7.48	Thomas Munkelt (GDR)	6 March 1983	Budapest

Ratified world records (1987-present)
Ratified
Not ratified
Ratified but later rescinded
Pending ratification

Time	Athlete	Date	Place	Ref
7.47	Mark McKoy (CAN)	8 March 1986	Tokyo	
7.36 (Note: Foster was observed to have had a rolling start, but the time was officially ratified.)	Greg Foster (USA)	16 January 1987	Los Angeles	
7.36	Colin Jackson (GBR)	12 February 1994	Glasgow	
7.30	Colin Jackson (GBR)	6 March 1994	Sindelfingen	
7.29	Grant Holloway (USA)	24 February 2021	Madrid	
7.29	Grant Holloway (USA)	20 March 2022	Belgrade	
7.27 A	Grant Holloway (USA)	16 February 2024	Albuquerque	

== Women ==
IAAF ratified bests (1966–1986)
Time	Athlete	Date	Place
8.1	Irina Press (URS)	27 March 1966	Westfalenhalle
8.1 (Note: Balzer and Ehrhardt ran 8.1 in the final of the European Indoor Championships; the photofinish gave Balzer first and Ehrhardt second, with each woman being credited with equalling the world record.)	Karin Balzer (GDR)	14 March 1971	Sofia
8.1	Anneliese Ehrhardt (GDR)	14 March 1971	Sofia
8.19	Anneliese Ehrhardt (GDR)	24 February 1973	Senftenburg
8.06	Anneliese Ehrhardt (GDR)	14 March 1973	Rotterdam
8.02	Anneliese Ehrhardt (GDR)	14 March 1973	Rotterdam
7.90	Anneliese Ehrhardt (GDR)	9 March 1974	Gothenburg
7.86	Grażyna Rabsztyn (POL)	8 February 1979	Zabrze
7.84	Grażyna Rabsztyn (POL)	17 February 1980	Zabrze
7.77	Zofia Bielczyk (POL)	1 March 1980	Sindelfingen

Ratified world records (1987-present)
Ratified
Not ratified
Ratified but later rescinded
Pending ratification

Time	Athlete	Date	Place	Ref
7.75	Bettine Jahn (GDR)	6 March 1983	Budapest	
7.74	Yordanka Donkova (BUL)	14 February 1987	Sofia	
7.73	Cornelia Oschkenat (GDR)	25 February 1989	Vienna	
7.71	Lyudmila Narozhilenko (URS)	4 February 1990	Chelyabinsk	
7.69	Lyudmila Narozhilenko (URS)	4 February 1990	Chelyabinsk	
7.68	Lyudmila Narozhilenko (URS)	2 March 1993	San Sebastián	
7.66	Lyudmila Narozhilenko (URS)	4 March 1993	Seville	
7.63	Lyudmila Narozhilenko (URS)	4 March 1993	Seville	
7.68	Susanna Kallur (SWE)	10 February 2008	Karlsruhe	
7.67	Devynne Charlton (BAH)	11 February 2024	New York City	
7.67 A	Tia Jones (USA)	16 February 2024	Albuquerque	
7.65	Devynne Charlton (BAH)	3 March 2024	Glasgow	
7.65	Devynne Charlton (BAH)	22 March 2026	Toruń	
