= Urs Nater =

Swiss-German psychologist

Urs Markus Nater (born 1974 in Zurich) is a Swiss-German psychologist. He is the head of the department of Clinical and Health Psychology of the Faculty of Psychology at the University of Vienna and also holds the professorship for Clinical Psychology of Adulthood.

== Academic contributions and merits ==
Urs Nater has studied psychology, psychopathology and neurophysiology at the University of Zurich. In 2004, he completed his PhD studies summa cum laude at the Faculty of Psychology as well as the International PhD Program in Neuroscience at the Center for Neuroscience of the University of Zurich and ETH Zurich with a certificate. From 2007 to 2010, he worked as a Senior Researcher (Oberassistent) with Ulrike Ehlert at the Department of Psychology at the University of Zurich. In 2010, Nater was offered a full professorship in Clinical Psychology at the University of Lausanne, which he declined. From 2011 to 2017, Urs Nater was Lichtenberg Professor of Clinical Biopsychology at the Philipps University of Marburg.

In 2017, he was appointed to the University of Vienna, where Nater holds the full professorship of Clinical Psychology of Adulthood. Since October 2018, he has also been the director of the Institute for Clinical and Health Psychology. There, he is head of the research group for stress and stress-related disorders as well as the Music and Health Lab. As of 2020, he is also head of the newly founded multidisciplinary research platform "The Stress of Life - Processes and Mechanisms underlying Everyday Life Stress" (SOLE).

One important aspect of his research activities is experimental stress research; here, Nater tries to identify mechanisms of stress-related morbidity, to develop novel methods of stress measurement - such as through biomarkers - as well as to investigate the effect of various interventions on the psychophysiological stress response. On the other hand, a major focus of his work is the study of stress in an ecologically valid context, i.e., in everyday life. Here, Nater seeks to gain a detailed description of the processes of stress in people's everyday lives as well as to examine targeted interventions time-contingently with the experience of stress. His writings are published in renowned journals and widely received.

For his scientific accomplishments, Nater received the Irmela Florin Research Award of the German Society for Behavioral Medicine in 2007, the Charlotte and Karl Bühler Award of the German Society for Psychology (DGPs) in 2012, the Outstanding New Investigator Award of the International Society for Behavioral Medicine (ISBM) in 2016, among others. He was elected Distinguished International Affiliate of the Society for Health Psychology (Div. 38 APA) in 2018.

== Selected honors ==
- 2012: Charlotte- und Karl-Bühler-Award, German Society of Psychology
- 2016: Outstanding New Investigator Award, International Society for Behavioral Medicine (ISBM)
- 2018: Distinguished International Affiliate of the Society for Health Psychology (Div. 38 APA)

== Selected memberships and professional services ==
=== Member of the editorial board ===
- Encyclopedia of Behavioral Medicine (Springer, associate editor, since 2010)
- Psychoneuroendocrinology (since 2010)
- Stress (since 2014, associate editor-in-chief since 2019)

=== Professional services ===
- 2012-2016: Member of the board and chair of the Communication Committee of the International Society of Behavioral Medicine (ISBM)
- 2013-2016: Secretary-treasurer and member of the executive committee of the American Psychosomatic Society (APS)
- 2018-2021: president of the International Society of Behavioral Medicine (ISBM)

== Selected publications ==
- Nater, U. M., & Rohleder, N. (2009). Salivary alpha-amylase as a non-invasive biomarker for the sympathetic nervous system: current state of research. Psychoneuroendocrinology, 34(4), 486-496. Salivary alpha-amylase as a non-invasive biomarker for the sympathetic nervous system: Current state of research
- Thoma, M. V., La Marca, R., Brönnimann, R., Finkel, L., Ehlert, U., & Nater, U. M. (2013). The effect of music on the human stress response. PLOS ONE, 8(8), e70156. The Effect of Music on the Human Stress Response
- Heim, C., Nater, U. M., Maloney, E., Boneva, R., Jones, J. F., & Reeves, W. C. (2009). Childhood trauma and risk for chronic fatigue syndrome: association with neuroendocrine dysfunction. Archives of General Psychiatry, 66(1), 72-80. Childhood Trauma and Risk for Chronic Fatigue Syndrome: Association With Neuroendocrine Dysfunction
