= Perspectives on Psychological Science =

- Discipline: Psychology
- Language: English

Publication details
- History: 2006-present
- Publisher: SAGE Publications on behalf of the Association for Psychological Science
- Frequency: Bi-monthly
- Impact factor: 11.621 (2021)

Standard abbreviations
- ISO 4: Perspect. Psychol. Sci.

Indexing
- ISSN: 1745-6916 (print); 1745-6924 (web)
- LCCN: 2006205924
- OCLC no.: 65176886

Links
- Journal homepage; Online access; Online archive

Perspectives on Psychological Science is a bimonthly peer-reviewed academic journal of psychology. The journal was established in 2006 and the founding editor was Ed Diener (University of Illinois at Urbana-Champaign). It is currently published by SAGE Publications on behalf of the Association for Psychological Science. Its last editor-in-chief Klaus Fiedler (University of Heidelberg) resigned on December 6, 2022, after a vote of no confidence by the Board of the Association for Psychological Science. As of December 1, 2024, its editor-in-chief is Arturo E. Hernandez.

The journal is a member of the Committee on Publication Ethics (COPE).

== Abstracting and indexing ==
The journal is abstracted and indexed in:

- Current Contents: Social & Behavioral Sciences
- EBSCOhost
- InfoTrac
- CSA Neurosciences Abstracts
- PsycINFO
- Scopus
- Social Sciences Citation Index
- PubMed: MEDLINE

According to the Journal Citation Reports, the journal has a 2021 impact factor of 11.621.
