= Kwaku Ohene-Frempong =

Ghanaian physician (1946–2022)

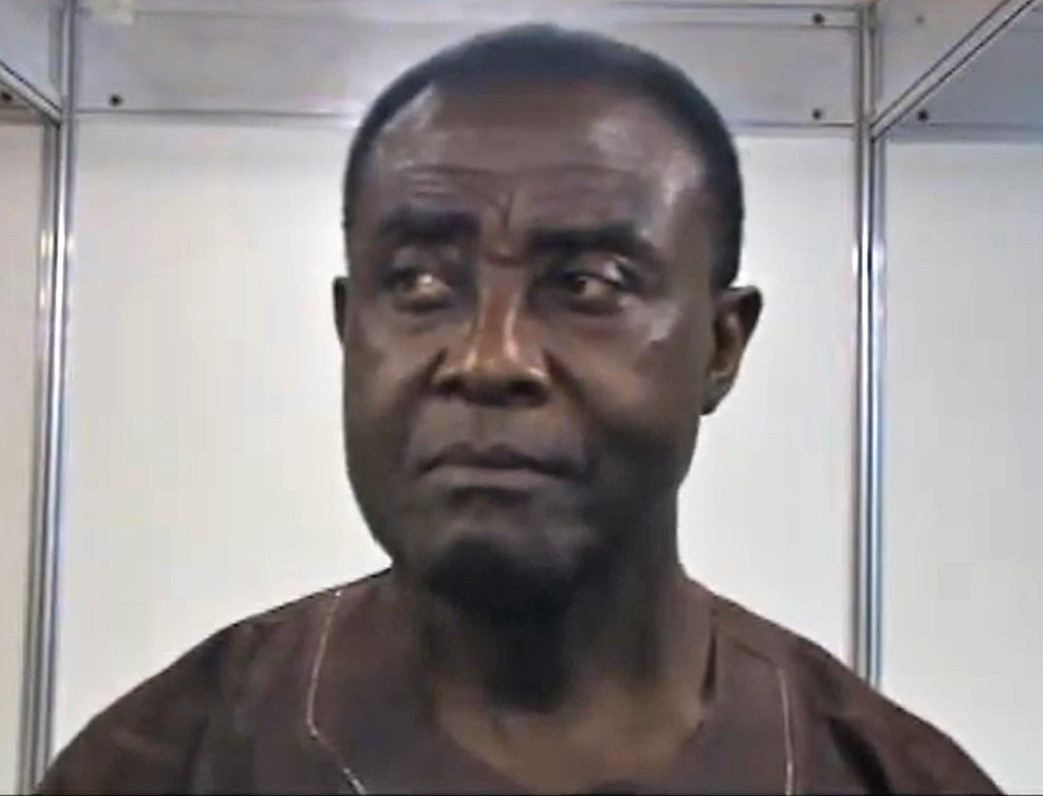
- Ohene-Frempong in 2011
- Born: 13 March 1946; Kukurantumi, Eastern Region, Gold Coast (now Ghana)
- Died: 7 May 2022 (aged 76)
- Education: Yale University
- Known for: Study of sickle cell disease
- Spouse: Janet Ohene-Frempong
- Awards: Order of the Volta (2010)
- Scientific career
- Fields: Pediatric hematology/oncology
- Workplaces: Tulane University School of Medicine, Perelman School of Medicine at the University of Pennsylvania, Children's Hospital of Philadelphia, Komfo Anokye Teaching Hospital

Kwaku Ohene-Frempong (13 March 1946 – 7 May 2022) was a Ghanaian pediatric hematologist-oncologist and an expert in sickle cell disease (SCD). Ohene-Frempong grew up in Ghana and was a standout athlete in track-and-field, later competing for Yale University as well as Ghana at the 1970 British Commonwealth Games. He continued his medical training in the United States, where he completed medical school, pediatrics residency and a pediatric hematology-oncology fellowship. With a professional interest in SCD, Ohene-Frempong was a physician and involved in public health initiatives at Tulane University School of Medicine in New Orleans, Louisiana, and later the Children's Hospital of Philadelphia (CHOP) in Pennsylvania. He continued professional relationships with Komfo Anokye Teaching Hospital in Kumasi, Ghana where he later became a full-time physician after retiring from CHOP. In Ghana, he established public health initiatives for SCD screening in newborns, as well as an SCD clinic for patients with the disease.

== Early life, education, and athletics ==
Ohene-Frempong was born on 13 March 1946 in Kukurantumi, Eastern Region, Gold Coast (now Ghana) to Kwasi Adde Ohene, a cocoa farmer, and Adwoa Odi Boafo. Because Kukurantumi lacked education above the middle school level, he completed Ordinary and Advanced-level secondary school studies at Prempeh College in Kumasi, Ashanti Region, where he was also a Senior Prefect. While at Prempeh, he was a senior high school national champion in several track and field events, including the hurdles, long jump and high jump.

After graduating from Prempeh, Ohene-Frempong was one of 16 Ghanaian students to receive a scholarship from the United States Agency for International Development-supported African Scholarship Program of American Universities, which he used to attend Yale University for his undergraduate studies. He graduated with a B.S. in biology in 1970. While at Yale, he was a standout athlete on the track-and-field and soccer teams, on which he competed for four and three years respectively. Ohene-Frempong was invited to compete on the Ghanaian national team at the 1968 Olympics, and although he initially planned to take a leave of absence for one semester to participate, he opted to focus on his studies instead. In his senior year, Ohene Frempong was Captain of the indoor (1969–70) and the outdoor (1970) track teams. That year, in the outdoor Ivy League track and field championships, he won first place in the 120-yard hurdles (110 metres hurdles) in 13.9 seconds, setting a Yale record as well as a Ghanaian national record that lasted until the 1996 Olympic games. He also won the 60-yard high hurdles in 7.10 seconds, setting a conference championship record. At his graduation, he was awarded the William Neely Mallory Award, given to Yale's "outstanding senior male student-athlete". Later that year, in July 1970, Ohene-Frempong represented Ghana at the men's 110 metres hurdles at the 1970 British Commonwealth Games, placing seventh with a time of 14.7 seconds.

Ohene-Frempong attended Yale School of Medicine, earning his M.D. degree in 1975. During medical school, he spent some of his training at Komfo Anokye Teaching Hospital (KATH) in Kumasi in 1974. As part of his M.D. requirements, he completed a thesis entitled "Child Health in a Ghanaian Community", based on some of his work at KATH. He completed his residency in Pediatrics at New York Hospital/Weill Cornell Medical Center in New York City, followed by a fellowship in Pediatric Hematology-Oncology at the Children's Hospital of Philadelphia (CHOP).

== Medical career ==
Ohene-Frempong became an Associate Professor of Pediatrics at the Tulane University School of Medicine in New Orleans, Louisiana in 1980. In his position there, he founded the Tulane Sickle Cell Center of Southern Louisiana and served as Medical Director there. He was also involved with the Louisiana Department of Health in starting a newborn screening program for SCD for infants in the state. Six years later, in 1986, Ohene-Frempong returned to Philadelphia, moving back to CHOP where he had completed his fellowship, with an academic appointment as Assistant Professor of Pediatrics at the Perelman School of Medicine at the University of Pennsylvania. At CHOP, he established the Comprehensive Sickle Cell Center, with funding awarded by the National Institutes of Health in 1988, and he became director in 1990. As part of his work with the Center, Ohene-Frempong led the Cooperative Study of Sickle Cell Disease (CSSCD), a multicenter study with the purpose of "[determining] the natural history of sickle cell disease from birth to death in order to identify those factors contributing to the morbidity and mortality of the disease." The study found that a leading cause of pediatric mortality in SCD was cerebrovascular clots, causing strokes in children. Subsequent studies identified patients sub-groups at high risk of cerebrovascular complications in SCD, and that interventions such as blood transfusions could prevent these complications and decrease mortality in children with SCD. In 1997, he subsequently achieved promotion to full professorship, and retired from CHOP and became an emeritus professor in 2011.

Despite being based in the United States, Ohene-Frempong continued his involvement in SCD care in Ghana, returning to KTAH to help establish a SCD clinic there in December 1992. In 1993, he receiving a grant from the NIH's National Heart, Lung, and Blood Institute for a SCD newborn screening pilot project in Ghana centered in Kumasi and the town of Tikrom, on Kumasi's outskirts; this was the first screening program for SCD in Africa. In its subsequent 10 years, 158,000 infants were tested for SCD in the region, with 2,400 out of 3,000 newborns connected to the SCD clinic at KTAH due to the screening program itself. After retiring from CHOP, Ohene-Frempong began working full-time at the Kumasi Center for Sickle Cell Disease. While in Ghana, he founded and served as president of the Sickle Cell Foundation of Ghana, and was also the in-country coordinator for the Consortium on Newborn Screening in Africa, which was established by the American Society of Hematology in 2018. Internationally, he was one of the founders of the Global Sickle Cell Disease Network, and helped organize the organization's First Global Congress on Sickle Cell Disease in July 2010, marking a century since SCD had been first published about in medical literature.

== Awards and honors ==
In 2010, he was awarded the Order of the Volta, awarded for outstanding service to the country of Ghana. In 2015, he received the Millennium Excellence Award in Medicine. In 2020, he received the Assistant Secretary of Health Exceptional Service Medal. In 2021, he received the Stratton Award for Translational and Clinical Science from The American Society for Hematology.

Ohene-Frempong also received several awards for his accomplishments in athletics. In 1999, he was inducted into the International Scholar Athlete Hall of Fame in its first year of existence, as well as an NCAA Silver Anniversary Award in 2000.

== Personal life ==
Ohene-Frempong married Janet Williams on 6 June 1970. Together they had two children, Kwami and Afia. Their son Kwame, who was born in 1972 while Ohene-Frempong was a medical student at Yale, was born with SCD. The diagnosis, as well as the realization during medical school that other family members had previously undiagnosed SCD, inspired Ohene-Frempong to make the disease the focus of his professional career. Kwame died due to complications of the disease in 2013.

Ohene-Frempong died on 7 May 2022 of metastatic lung cancer.
