= Leszek Wodzyński =

Polish hurdler

Personal information
- Nationality: Polish
- Born: 16 February 1946 Warsaw, Poland
- Died: 18 September 1999 (aged 53) Warsaw, Poland

Sport
- Sport: Running
- Event: 110 metres hurdles
Medal record
Men's athletics
Representing Poland
European Championships
Bronze medal – third place	1974 Rome	110 m hurdles
European Indoor Championships
Gold medal – first place	1975 Katowice	60 m hurdles

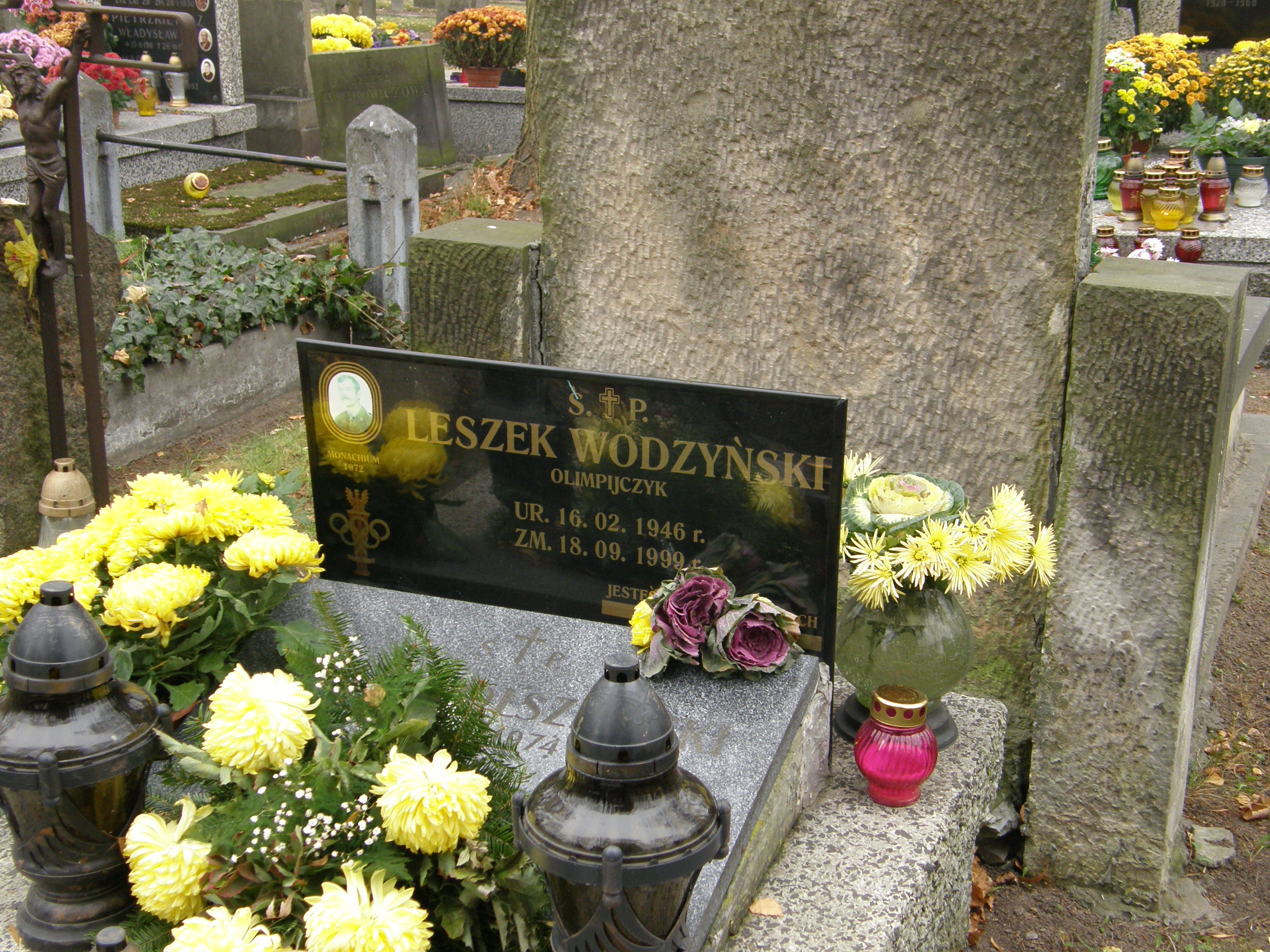
Grave of Wodzyński at the Powązki Military Cemetery in Warsaw

Leszek Wodzyński (16 February 1946 near Warsaw – 18 September 1999 in Warsaw) was a Polish hurdler and the older brother of Mirosław Wodzyński. In 1974, the two brothers were ranked #3 and #4 in the world, behind Charles Foster and the eventual 1976 Olympic champion Guy Drut. Leszek was also in the top 10 in 1972.

== Biography ==
His personal best was 13.64 seconds, achieved in July 1974 in Warsaw. He was participant in Olympic Games 1972.

== International competitions ==
Year	Competition	Venue	Position	Event	Notes
Representing Poland
1964	European Junior Games	Warsaw, Poland	8th (h)	110 m hurdles	15.2
1967	European Indoor Games	Prague, Czechoslovakia	7th (sf)	50 m hurdles	6.8
1969	European Indoor Games	Belgrade, Yugoslavia	10th (h)	50 m hurdles	7.1
1970	European Indoor Championships	Vienna, Austria	9th (sf)	60 m hurdles	8.1
1971	European Championships	Helsinki, Finland	5th	110 m hurdles	14.37
1972	European Indoor Championships	Grenoble, France	7th (sf)	50 m hurdles	6.70
1972	Olympic Games	Munich, West Germany	6th	110 m hurdles	13.72
1973	European Indoor Championships	Rotterdam, Netherlands	5th	60 m hurdles	7.83
1974	European Indoor Championships	Gothenburg, Sweden	4th	60 m hurdles	7.94
1974	European Championships	Rome, Italy	3rd	110 m hurdles	13.71
1975	European Indoor Championships	Katowice, Poland	1st	60 m hurdles	7.69
