= Mirosław Wodzyński =

Polish hurdler

Personal information
- Nationality: Polish
- Born: 13 July 1951 Warsaw, Poland
- Died: Warsaw, Poland

Sport
- Sport: Running
- Event: 110 metres hurdles
Medal record
Men's athletics
Representing Poland
European Championships
| Silver medal – second place | 1974 Rome | 110 m hurdles |
European Indoor Championships
| Silver medal – second place | 1974 Gothenburg | 60 m hurdles |

Mirosław Zenon Wodzyński (born 13 July 1951 in Warsaw) is a Polish former hurdler. He is the younger brother of Leszek Wodzyński. In 1974, the two brothers were ranked #3 and #4 in the world, behind Charles Foster and the eventual 1976 Olympic champion Guy Drut. Mirosław was also in the top 10 in 1973 and 1975.

His personal best was 13.55 seconds, achieved in May 1975 in Warsaw.

== International competitions ==
| Year | Competition | Venue | Position | Event | Notes |
Representing Poland
| 1970 | European Junior Championships | Paris, France | 2nd | 110 m hurdles | 14.22 |
| 1971 | European Championships | Helsinki, Finland | 8th | 110 m hurdles | 14.78 |
| 1972 | European Indoor Championships | Grenoble, France | 6th | 50 m hurdles | 6.68 |
| 1972 | Olympic Games | Munich, West Germany | 16th (sf) | 110 m hurdles | 14.63 |
| 1973 | European Indoor Championships | Rotterdam, Netherlands | 4th | 60 m hurdles | 7.82 |
| 1974 | European Indoor Championships | Gothenburg, Sweden | 2nd | 60 m hurdles | 7.68 |
| 1974 | European Championships | Rome, Italy | 2nd | 110 m hurdles | 13.67 |
| 1975 | European Indoor Championships | Katowice, Poland | 5th | 60 m hurdles | 7.85 |
