= 1967 European Indoor Games – Men's 50 metres hurdles =

The men's 50 metres hurdles event at the 1967 European Indoor Games was held on 11 and 12 March in Prague.

== Medalists ==
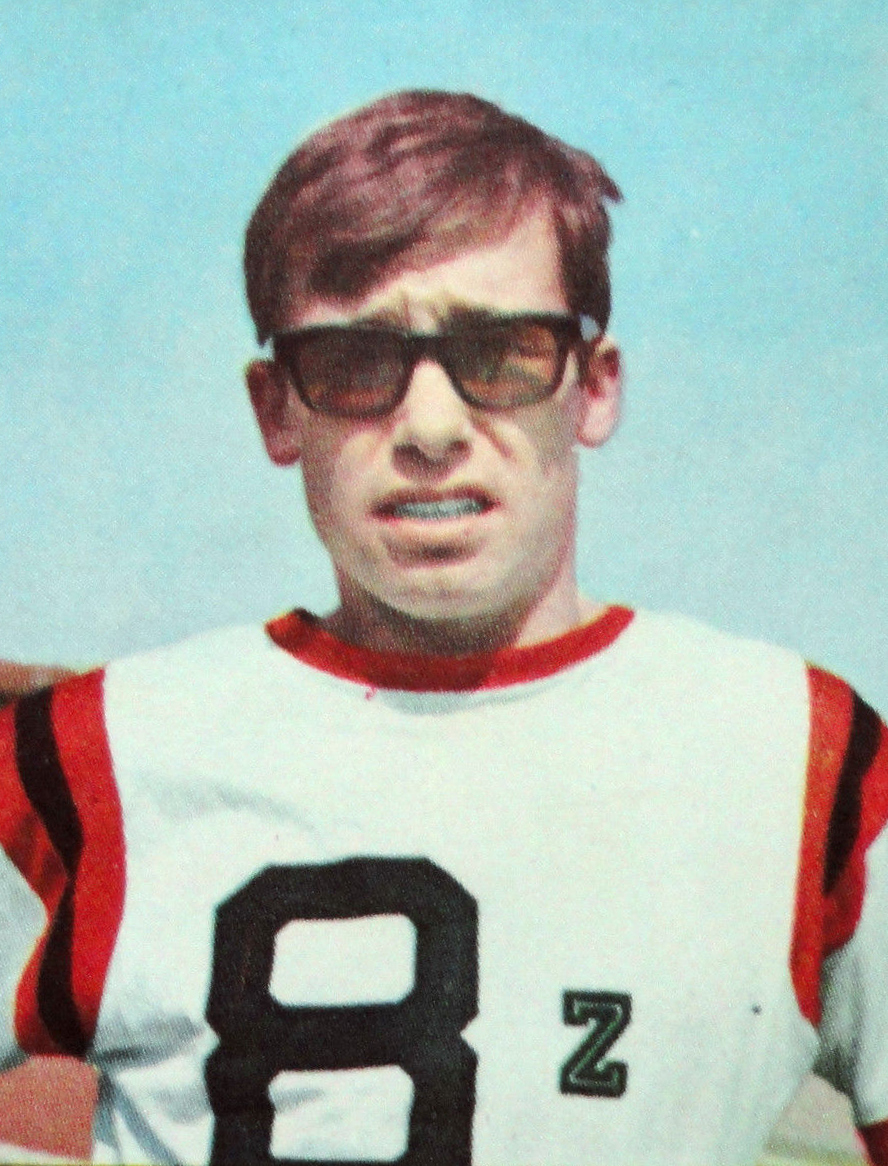
Eddy Ottoz, gold medal in the 50 m hs at the age of 23.

Gold	Silver	Bronze
Eddy Ottoz; Italy	Valentin Chistyakov; Soviet Union	Anatoliy Mikhaylov; Soviet Union

== Results ==
=== Heats ===
Held on 11 March

First 4 from each heat (Q) qualified directly for the semifinals.

Rank	Heat	Name	Nationality	Time	Notes
1	1	Eddy Ottoz	Italy	6.4	Q, WB
2	1	Adam Kołodziejczyk	Poland	6.8	Q
3	1	Milan Čečman	Czechoslovakia	6.9	Q
4	1	Iliya Iliyev	Bulgaria	6.9	Q
5	1	Çetin Şahiner	Turkey	6.9	
1	2	Anatoliy Mikhaylov	Soviet Union	6.6	Q
2	2	Sergio Liani	Italy	6.9	Q
3	2	Milan Kotik	Czechoslovakia	7.0	Q
4	2	Fiorenzo Marchesi	Switzerland	7.0	Q
	2	Kjellfred Weum	Norway	DQ	
1	3	Valentin Chistyakov	Soviet Union	6.6	Q
2	3	Hinrich John	West Germany	6.7	Q
3	3	Leszek Wodzyński	Poland	6.9	Q
4	3	Richard Stotz	East Germany	7.0	Q

=== Semifinals ===
Held on 11 March

First 3 from each heat (Q) qualified directly for the final.

Rank	Heat	Name	Nationality	Time	Notes
1	1	Eddy Ottoz	Italy	6.4	Q, =WB
2	1	Adam Kołodziejczyk	Poland	6.8	Q
3	1	Valentin Chistyakov	Soviet Union	6.8	Q
4	1	Richard Stotz	East Germany	7.1	
5	1	Iliya Iliyev	Bulgaria	7.4	
6	1	Milan Kotik	Czechoslovakia	7.4	
1	2	Anatoliy Mikhaylov	Soviet Union	6.7	Q
2	2	Hinrich John	West Germany	6.7	Q
3	2	Milan Čečman	Czechoslovakia	6.8	Q
4	2	Leszek Wodzyński	Poland	6.8	
5	2	Sergio Liani	Italy	6.8	
6	2	Fiorenzo Marchesi	Switzerland	7.0	

=== Final ===
Held on 12 March

Rank	Lane	Name	Nationality	Time	Notes
1st place, gold medalist(s)	1	Eddy Ottoz	Italy	6.4	=WB
2nd place, silver medalist(s)	6	Valentin Chistyakov	Soviet Union	6.6	
3rd place, bronze medalist(s)	3	Anatoliy Mikhaylov	Soviet Union	6.7	
4	2	Milan Čečman	Czechoslovakia	6.7	
5	4	Adam Kołodziejczyk	Poland	6.7	
6	5	Hinrich John	West Germany	6.7	
