= Stuart Storey =

British sports commentator and former 110m hurdler

Stuart Storey MBE
Personal information
- Nationality: British (English)
- Born: 16 September 1942 (age 83) Louth, Lincolnshire, England
- Height: 183 cm (6 ft 0 in)
- Weight: 75 kg (165 lb)

Sport
- Sport: Athletics
- Event: hurdles
- Club: Birchfield Harriers

Stuart Ellis Storey MBE (born 16 September 1942) is a British sports commentator and former 110 metres hurdler who competed at the 1968 Summer Olympics.

== Biography ==
Storey was born in Louth, Lincolnshire. He grew up in Holbeach, later helping to coach local resident Geoff Capes at Holbeach Athletics Club. He was educated at Spalding Grammar School. At Loughborough Training College (became Loughborough College of Education in 1963, then part of the University in 1977) he qualified as a teacher of physical education and mathematics.

Storey finished third behind Alan Pascoe in the 120 yards hurdles event at the 1968 AAA Championships. Later that year at the 1968 Olympic Games in Mexico City, he represented Great Britain in the 110 metres hurdles.

Storey finished third behind Willem Coetzee in the 110 metres hurdles event at the 1969 AAA Championships. He represented England in the 110 metres hurdles, at the 1970 British Commonwealth Games in Edinburgh, Scotland. He also held the British record at the 200 metres hurdles.

On retiring from the sport, he joined Thames Polytechnic (now part of the University of Greenwich) where he held the post of director of physical education for 16 years until 1989. He also became an athletics broadcaster on the BBC and since 1973 commentated on nine Olympic Games from 1976 to 2008. He was the BBC's regular basketball and squash commentator during the 1970s and 1980s. He left the BBC after the 2008 Olympic Games in Beijing.

He later worked as a freelance commentator for Nova International for their Great Run series of road races, for IMG Sweden on the world feed of the IAAF Diamond League athletics meetings and for the host broadcasting services for the 2012 Olympic Games in London and 2014 Commonwealth Games in Glasgow. He provided commentary at the Sochi winter Olympics for a number of broadcasters. He stopped working as a commentator after the Diamond League meeting in Brussels on 1 September 2017.

Storey provided commentary for a number of Olympic video games, including Sydney 2000, Salt Lake 2002 and Athens 2004.

Storey retired from commentating near the end of the 2017, after 44 years of work. An article was published in Athletics Weekly about his experiences at the time of the announcement of his retirement. He said that his favourite moment commentating was in 2012 London Olympic games where he was the lead commentator for the track events along with Peter Matthews.

In 2001, he became a part-time commercial manager of Neath RFC, as his son played for the team.

He was appointed MBE in the 2024 Birthday Honours list for services to sport and to the community in East Hertfordshire.
