= Godfrey Murray =

Jamaican hurdler (born 1950)

Personal information
- Nationality: Jamaican
- Born: 6 August 1950 (age 75)

Sport
- Sport: Track and field
- Event: 110 metres hurdles

Godfrey Murray (born 6 August 1950) is a Jamaican hurdler. He competed in the men's 110 metres hurdles at the 1972 Summer Olympics.

Murray competed for the Michigan Wolverines track and field team in the NCAA.

He won a bronze medal in the 110 metres hurdles at the 1970 British Commonwealth Games and finished fourth in the 110 metres hurdles at the 1971 Pan American Games.
