= Mal Baird =

Australian hurdler (born 1948)

Personal information
- Nationality: Australian
- Born: 6 July 1948 (age 78)

Sport
- Sport: Track and field
- Event: 110 metres hurdles
Medal record
Representing Australia
Commonwealth Games
Silver medal – second place	1970 Edinburgh	110m Hurdles

Malcolm "Mal" Baird (born 6 July 1948) is an Australian hurdler. He competed in the men's 110 metres hurdles at the 1972 Summer Olympics.
