= Adeola Aboyade-Cole =

Nigerian hurdler

Personal information
- Full name: Adeola Bankole Aboyade-Cole
- Nationality: Nigerian
- Born: 20 March 1950
- Died: 17 March 1989 (aged 38) Chicago, Illinois, U.S.

Sport
- Sport: Track and field
- Event: 110 metres hurdles

Adeola Aboyade-Cole (20 March 1950 – 17 March 1989) was a Nigerian hurdler. He competed in the men's 110 metres hurdles at the 1972 Summer Olympics.

Aboyade-Cole died on 17 March 1989 in Chicago, U.S., at the age of 38.
