= Jan Pech =

Personal information
- Full name: Jan N. Václav Pech
- Date of birth: 8 April 1886
- Place of birth: Libeň, Austria-Hungary
- Date of death: 20 June 1924 (aged 38)
- Position: Goalkeeper

Senior career*
| Years | Team | Apps | (Gls) |
- Meteor Prague

International career
| 1906 | Bohemia | 1 | (0) |
- * Club domestic league appearances and goals

Jan N. Václav Pech (8 April 1886 – 20 June 1924) was a Czech footballer who played as a goalkeeper.

== Club career ==
During his playing career, Pech played for Meteor Prague.

== International career ==
On 1 April 1906, Pech made his debut for Bohemia in Bohemia's second game, (Note: The April 1906 meeting is regarded as the first official game for Bohemia by the Football Association of the Czech Republic (FAČR), with a meeting between Hungary and Bohemia on 5 April 1903 subsequently being recognised as a Prague representative team by the FAČR. The Hungarian Football Federation recognises the April 1903 meeting as official for Bohemia.) starting in a 1–1 draw against Hungary. It was Pech's only cap for Bohemia.
