= Guy Drut =

French athletics competitor and politician

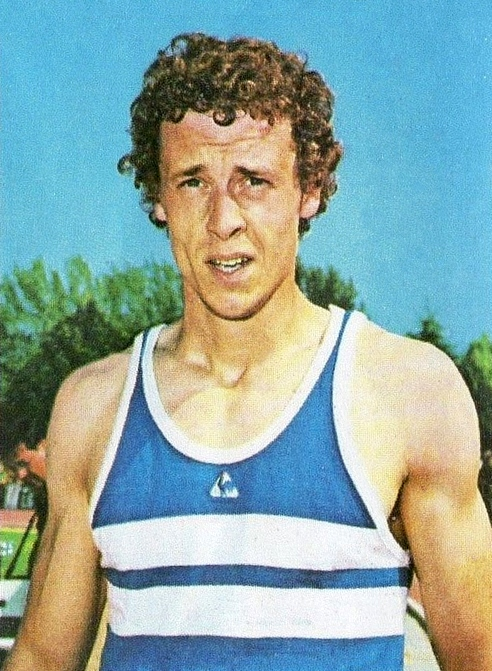
- Guy Drut c. 1973

Personal information
- Nationality: French
- Born: 6 December 1950 (age 75) Oignies, Pas-de-Calais, France
- Height: 1.88 m (6 ft 2 in)
- Weight: 74 kg (163 lb)

Sport
- Country: France
- Sport: Athletics
- Event: 110 metres hurdles

Achievements and titles
- Personal bests: 110 mH – 13.0 & 13.28 (both 1975)
Medal record
Men's athletics
Representing France
Olympic Games
Gold medal – first place	1976 Montreal	110 m hurdles
Silver medal – second place	1972 Munich	110 m hurdles
European Championships
Gold medal – first place	1974 Rome	110 m hurdles
European Indoor Championships
Gold medal – first place	1972 Grenoble	50 m hurdles
Bronze medal – third place	1970 Vienna	60 m hurdles
Bronze medal – third place	1981 Grenoble	50 m hurdles

Guy Drut (born 6 December 1950) is an Olympic champion and politician who won gold at the 1976 Summer Olympics in Montreal in the 110 m hurdles. In 1996, he became a member of the International Olympic Committee (IOC).

== Biography ==
=== Sports career ===
Born in Oignies, Pas-de-Calais, France, Drut captured the silver medal in the 1972 Summer Olympics in Munich, finishing behind the American Rod Milburn. In the European Championship of 1974 Drut came a comfortable first. It was at the next Olympics that Guy was to realise his dream, winning the 110 m hurdles in a time of 13.30 ahead of Cuba's Alejandro Casañas and the American Willie Davenport.

=== Political career ===
After retirement Guy became active in business and politics, with one of his roles being Minister of Youth Affairs and Sports in the conservative government of Alain Juppé from 1995 to 1997. He has been convicted by French courts (a 15-month suspended prison sentence) at the end of 2005 for accepting fictitious employment as political patronage; as a consequence suspended by the IOC.

In 2006, president Jacques Chirac amnestied Drut, using a rarely used clause in a 2002 amnesty law authorizing the president to grant amnesty for certain categories of crimes to people who had made great contributions to France in certain fields. The move caused great controversy, including within the majority members of Parliament: president of the National Assembly Jean-Louis Debré commented that it gave an unpleasant impression of "self-washing machine" but said it was a "courageous" move that he would not have made; Nicolas Sarkozy, president of the majority party UMP, disapproved such uses of amnesty. Chirac justified it by France's regaining a seat at IOC.

Drut served on the IOC's Evaluation Commission for the 2016 Summer Olympics.

== International competitions ==
Year	Competition	Venue	Position	Event	Notes
Representing France
1969	European Championships	Athens, Greece	4th	110 m hurdles	14.08
1970	European Indoor Championships	Vienna, Austria	3rd	60 m hurdles	7.8
1971	European Championships	Helsinki, Finland	–	110 m hurdles	DNF
1971	Mediterranean Games	İzmir, Turkey	1st	110 m hurdles	13.7
1972	European Indoor Championships	Grenoble, France	1st	50 m hurdles	6.51
1972	Olympic Games	Munich, West Germany	2nd	110 m hurdles	13.34
1973	European Indoor Championships	Rotterdam, Netherlands	6th	60 m hurdles	9.22
1974	European Indoor Championships	Gothenburg, Sweden	3rd (h)	60 m hurdles	7.87^{1}
1974	European Championships	Rome, Italy	1st	110 m hurdles	13.40
1976	Olympic Games	Montreal, Canada	1st	110 m hurdles	13.30
1981	European Indoor Championships	Grenoble, France	3rd	50 m hurdles	6.54

^{1} Did not finish in the final

Sporting positions
Preceded by (United States) Rodney Milburn	Men's 110 m Hurdles Best Year Performance; 1974–1976	Succeeded by (Cuba) Alejandro Casañas
