= Rich McDonald =

Canadian hurdler (born 1949)

Personal information
- Nationality: Canadian
- Born: 21 May 1949 (age 77)

Sport
- Sport: Track and field
- Event: 110 metres hurdles

Rich McDonald (born 21 May 1949) is a Canadian hurdler. He competed in the men's 110 metres hurdles at the 1972 Summer Olympics.
