= Klaus Fiedler =

German psychologist

Klaus Fiedler (born September 7, 1951, in Wetzlar and passed May 12, 2026) was a German psychologist who taught as a professor for social psychology at the Universität Heidelberg.

== Biography ==
Fiedler studied psychology at the Justus-Liebig-Universität Gießen getting his diploma in 1975. He continued to work there as a research fellow and did his doctorate in 1979. One year later he got a two-year stipend at the German Research Foundation that was followed by his employment as an assistant professor in Giessen. His habilitation took place in 1984. In 1987 he was named Professor for Cognitive and Social-cognitive Psychology. After a professorship at the Universität Mannheim that started in 1990, he became a Professor of Social psychology at the Ruprecht-Karls-Universität Heidelberg two years later. In 2004/05 Fiedler was a guest professor at New School for Social Research in New York City, USA.

On January 1, 2022, Fiedler became the first non-American editor-in-chief of Perspectives on Psychological Science (PoPS). He resigned on December 6, 2022, after a vote of no confidence by the Board of the Association for Psychological Science in the handling of a submission and reviews of a manuscript about racial biases in psychology. When concerns about misconduct were made public in a preprint by Steven Othello Roberts, over 1,200 psychologists signed an open letter expressing their concerns about Fiedler's handling of the review process accusing Fiedler of "racism, editorial incompetence, and abuse of power." The decision elicited a variety of responses in support of the decision and in support of Fiedler. Although details about the decision process are not public, the German Society for Psychology voiced concerns about the lack of an adequate hearing in the process. Fiedler has criticized the actions of APS as "premature" and the social media response as "unwarranted constructive inferences of social-media users" and rejected the accusations of editorial abuse of power.

== Research interests ==
Fiedler attempted to address critical issues in the decision process of modern society where there is often an excess of sometimes contradictory information. In those circumstances, Fiedler tried to determine how the best effective rational decisions can be made. He also investigated how intuitively good decisions can be made when information is limited. Fiedler researched how specific linguistic features may disclose the intentions of a speaker.

A concern of Fiedler was the credibility gap of contemporary research manifesting itself in a lack of reproducible results; he was asking for scientific standards to demonstrate reproducibility.

== Awards and invited memberships ==
- 2000, Leibniz Prize of the German Research Foundation (GRF)
- 2000, Deutscher Psychologie-Preis of the German Society for Psychology
- 2002, Member of the German National Academy of Sciences Leopoldina
- 2003, Member of the Heidelberger Akademie der Wissenschaften
- 2009, Koselleck-Preis of the GRF
- 2022, Wilhelm-Wundt-Medaille of the GRF

== Selected works ==
- Klaus Fiedler, Peter Juslin (Hrsg.): Information sampling and adaptive cognition. Cambridge University Press, New York 2006.
- Klaus Fiedler (Hrsg.): Social Communication. Psychology Press, New York 2007, ISBN 978-1-84169-428-3.
