= Graham Gower =

British athlete

Personal information
- Nationality: British (English)
- Born: 25 May 1947 Gravesend, Kent, England
- Died: 10 May 2017 (aged 69) Watford, Hertfordshire, England
- Occupation(s): Geography Teacher, Author
- Employer: Watford Boys Grammar School

Sport
- Sport: Athletics
- Event: Hurdles
- Club: Hillingdon AC

Graham John Gower (25 May 1947 – 10 May 2017) was a male athlete who competed for Great Britain and England.

== Biography ==
Gower finished third behind David Hemery in the 110 metres hurdles event at the 1970 AAA Championships and would go on to podium every year from 1971 to 1975, being unlucky to race during a time when British hurdling was at a peak with David Hemery, Alan Pascoe and Berwyn Price all racing.

He represented England in the 110 metres hurdles, at the 1974 British Commonwealth Games in Christchurch, New Zealand.

In the early 1970s, and at the time of his appearance for Englandin the 1974 Commonwealth Games he taught geography at Watford Boys Grammar School and was the co-author of 'Basic Processes in Physical Geography'- used worldwide and many UK student's first introduction to physical geography.
