= Nurullah Candan =

Turkish high jumper

Personal information
- Nationality: Turkish
- Born: 30 December 1948 (age 77) Ankara, Turkey

Sport
- Sport: Athletics
- Event: High jump

Nurullah Candan (born 30 December 1948) is a Turkish athlete. He competed in the men's high jump at the 1968 Summer Olympics.
