= German Society for Psychology =

- Deutsche Gesellschaft für Psychologie
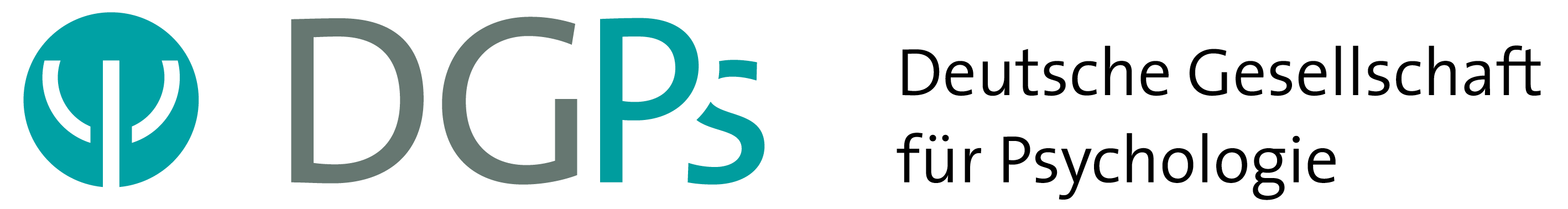
- Predecessor: Gesellschaft für Experimentelle Psychologie
- Formation: 1904; 122 years ago
- Type: National society of psychologists
- Purpose: Education and research in psychology
- Location: Germany
- Members: 3000
- Chair: Jürgen Margraf
- Main organ: Psychologische Rundschau
- Website: Official website

The German Society for Psychology (Deutsche Gesellschaft für Psychologie) is the German national society of psychologists for education and research in psychology.

The society was founded in 1904 as the Gesellschaft für Experimentelle Psychologie; it adopted its present name in 1929. There are 3000 individual members; ordinary membership requires a Ph.D. and two scientific publications. The present chair of the Society is Jürgen Margraf. Its official publication is Psychologische Rundschau, published since 1949.
