= Jiří Čeřovský =

Czech politician

Jiří Čeřovský (born 23 May 1955 in Semily) is a Czech regional politician and former athlete. He is a member of Civic Democratic Party.

== Life and career ==
Čeřovský graduated from Charles University with a PhD in biology and chemistry. In the 1970s, he had reached excellent results in athletics (he won all Czechoslovak masterships from 1975 to 1983 and had represented Czechoslovakia in world championships). Later Čeřovský taught biology at the Sport School in Jablonec nad Nisou.

After the fall of communism in Czechoslovakia (1989), he became a member of the city council of Jablonec nad Nisou. From 1994 to 2006 he was mayor of the city, and since 2004 he is a member of the Regional Council of Liberec Region. In September 2019, he was re-elected mayor of the city.
