= Berwyn Price =

Welsh athlete (born 1951)

Personal information
- Nationality: British (Welsh)
- Born: 15 August 1951 (age 75) Tredegar, Wales
- Height: 190 cm (6 ft 3 in)
- Weight: 80 kg (12 st 8 lb)

Sport
- Sport: Athletics
- Event: hurdles
- Club: Cardiff AAC
Medal record
Men's athletics
Representing Great Britain
European Indoor Championships
Silver medal – second place	1976 Munich	60m hurdles
Summer Universiade
Gold medal – first place	1973 Moscow	110m hurdles
Representing Wales
Commonwealth Games
Gold medal – first place	1978 Edmonton	110m hurdles
Silver medal – second place	1974 Christchurch	110m hurdles

Berwyn Price (born 15 August 1951) is a Welsh former international athlete who competed at the 1972 Summer Olympics and 1976 Summer Olympics.

== Biography ==
Price was born in Tredegar, Monmouthshire, and studied at Lewis School, Pengam and the University College of Wales, Aberystwyth.

A member of the Cardiff Amateur Athletic Club, Price was three-times runner up at the AAA Championships in 1970 behind David Hemery and 1971 and 1972 behind Alan Pascoe before representing Great Britain at the 1972 Olympics Games in Munich.

He finally became the British 110 metres hurdles champion after winning the British title at the 1973 AAA Championships and would go on to retain it every year from 1974 to 1978.

Price won the silver medal in the 110-metre hurdles at the 1974 British Commonwealth Games and the gold medal in the same event at the 1978 Commonwealth Games. Price also competed for Great Britain at the 1976 Olympics Games in Montreal, in the 110-metre hurdles.

Price later became assistant director of leisure for Swansea City Council, head of sports yourism for Swansea and project manager for the "White Rock" project to replace the Morfa Stadium.

== International competitions ==
Year	Competition	Venue	Position	Event	Notes
Representing Great Britain and Wales
1970	British Commonwealth Games	Edinburgh, United Kingdom	11th (sf)	110 m hurdles	14.4
1970	European Junior Championships	Paris, France	1st	110 m hurdles	14.21
1971	European Championships	Helsinki, Finland	18th (h)	110 m hurdles	14.57
1972	European Indoor Championships	Grenoble, France	22nd (h)	50 m hurdles	6.97
1972	Olympic Games	Munich, West Germany	14th (sf)	110 m hurdles	14.37
1972	Olympic Games	Munich, West Germany	11th (h)	4 × 100 m relay	39.63
1973	Universiade	Moscow, Soviet Union	1st	110 m hurdles	13.69
1974	British Commonwealth Games	Christchurch, New Zealand	2nd	110 m hurdles	13.84
1974	British Commonwealth Games	Christchurch, New Zealand	13th (sf)	400 m hurdles	52.80
1974	European Championships	Rome, Italy	7th	110 m hurdles	14.05
1976	European Indoor Championships	Munich, West Germany	2nd	60 m hurdles	7.80
1976	Olympic Games	Montreal, Canada	10th (sf)	110 m hurdles	13.73
1978	European Indoor Championships	Milan, Italy	4th	60 m hurdles	8.12
1978	Commonwealth Games	Edmonton, Canada	1st	110 m hurdles	13.70 (w)
1978	Commonwealth Games	Edmonton, Canada	9th (h)	4 × 400 m relay	3:11.89
1978	European Championships	Prague, Czechoslovakia	9th (sf)	110 m hurdles	14.01
1982	Commonwealth Games	Brisbane, Australia	6th	110 m hurdles	13.73

== Sources ==
- Olympic record
- Berwyn Price at World Athletics
- Berwyn Price at Tilastopaja (registration required)
- Berwyn Price at Olympics.com
- Berwyn Price at Team GB
- Berwyn Price at Olympedia
- Berwyn Price at the Commonwealth Games Federation (archived)
- Berwyn Price at InterSportStats
