= Werner Trzmiel =

German hurdler (1942–2026)

Personal information
- Nationality: German
- Born: 16 March 1942 Castrop-Rauxel, Gau Westphalia-North, Germany
- Died: 7 June 2026 (aged 84) Dieburg, Hesse, Germany
- Height: 183 cm (6 ft 0 in)
- Weight: 74 kg (163 lb)

Sport
- Country: Germany
- Sport: Hurdling

Achievements and titles
- Personal best: 110H – 13.60 (1968)

Werner Trzmiel (16 March 1942 – 7 June 2026) was a German Olympic hurdler. He represented his country at the 1964 and 1968 Summer Olympics. Trzmiel died on 7 June 2026, at the age of 84.
