= Vlastimil Hoferek =

Czech former sprint and hurdling athlete (born 1946)

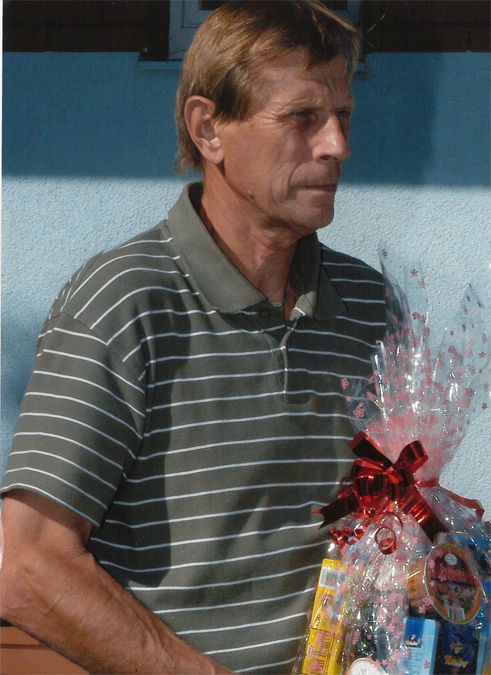
- Vlastimil Hoferek

Personal information
- Nationality: Czech
- Born: 6 November 1946 (age 79) Ostrava, Czechoslovakia

Sport
- Sport: Track and field – hurdling
- Club: Vitkovice, Třinec

Vlastimil Hoferek (born 6 November 1946) is a Czech former sprint and hurdling athlete. He specialised in the 110 metres hurdles and 60 metres hurdles. During his career in which he represented Czechoslovakia, Hoferek participated in four international athletics meetings, one Summer Universiade, two European Athletics Indoor Championships and European Athletics Championships in Rome. He is the 60 metres hurdles Czechoslovak Record Holder (7.7 seconds) and the Czechoslovak Indoor Champion from 1973.

== Athletics career ==
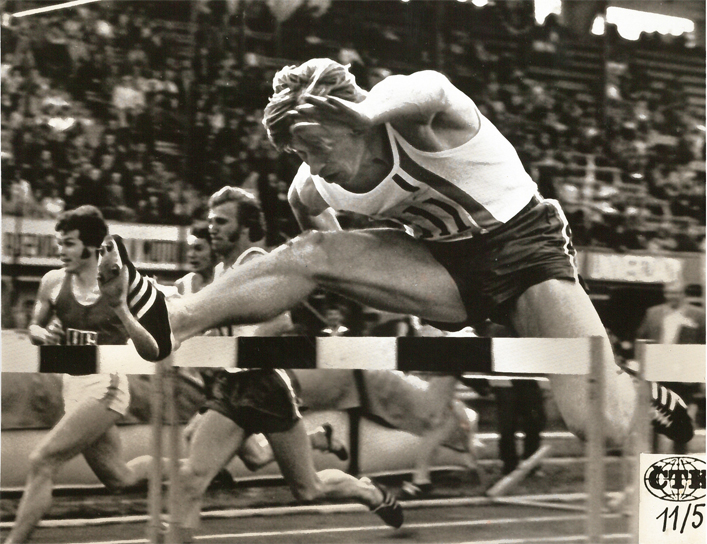
Vlastimil Hoferek at the Czechoslovak Universiade 1973

Hoferek started his athletics career under the coach Gibala in Trenčín; in 1959 he continued in Ostrava-Poruba under the coach Frantisek Klusal and in 1964 he moved to Vítkovice athletics club in Ostrava where he trained under the coach Rudolf Chovanec. During his military service in 1966–1967 he trained in Banská Bystrica and thereafter he returned to Vitkovice club in Ostrava and run for the club until 1974. In 1972 he started to train with the coach Ota Svršek and under Svršek's leadership achieved his best results.

In 1973 Hoferek became the Czechoslovak Indoor Champion setting a national record of 7.7 s in the 60 m hurdles which qualified him for the European Athletics Indoor Championships in Rotterdam. In the same year he also won a gold at the Czechoslovak Universiade running 14.2 s in the 110 m hurdles. In 1974 he collided with a press photographer during the final at the Czechoslovak Athletics Indoor Championship and missed his opportunity to defend his indoor champion title. At the European Indoor Championship in Gothenburg he also missed qualifying for the final by one hundredth of a second and came ninth. At the European Athletics Championships in Rome in 1974 he came tenth running the 110 m hurdlers in 13.89 s setting his personal best. In the same year he was sharing 26th-34th position in the world athletics table.

In 1975 he was selected to prepare for the 1976 Summer Olympics in Montreal. Following the relegation of Vitkovice club he transferred to Trinec athletics club in the same year but due to protracted injury he ended his career in 1976.

== Post-retirement career ==
Since ending his active career in 1976 he continued to dedicate his free time to athletics and sport. During the years 1976–1991, he coached young athletes from Juvinelles and Juniors to Youth and the Under 21. Since 1982 till 2017 he was the chair of the regional athletics association of the Moravian-Silesian Region. During 1990-1992 he was the chair of the methodical committee and a member of VV ČAS (executive committee of Czechoslovak Athletics Association). He has been working as a track and field athletics official at both juvenile and international athletics events. Currently he is a member of supervisory committee for the Centre of Individual Sports in Ostrava.

== Achievements ==
Year	Competition	Venue	Position	Notes
International competitions - representing Czechoslovakia
1973	European Athletics Indoor Championships	Rotterdam, Netherlands	11th	60 metres hurdles – 8.01 s
1973	Summer Universiade	Moscow, Soviet Union	semifinal	110 metres hurdles – 14.51 s
1974	European Athletics Indoor Championships	Gothenburg, Sweden	9th	60 metres hurdles – 8.02 s
1974	European Athletics Championships	Rome, Italia	10th	110 metres hurdles – 13.89 s
National Czechoslovak competitions
1972	Czechoslovak Athletics Indoor Championships	Jablonec nad Nisou, Czechoslovakia	2nd	50 metres hurdles – 6.8 s
1973	Czechoslovak Athletics Indoor Championships	Jablonec nad Nisou, Czechoslovakia	1st	60 metres hurdles – 7.7 s (NR)
1973	Czechoslovak Athletics Championships	Banská Bystrica, Czechoslovakia	2nd	110 metres hurdles – 14.0 s
1973	Czechoslovak Universiade	Banská Bystrica, Czechoslovakia	1st	110 metres hurdles – 14.2 s
1974	Czechoslovak Athletics Indoor Championships	Jablonec nad Nisou, Czechoslovakia	2nd	60 metres hurdles – 7.7 s
1974	Czechoslovak Athletics Championships	Prague, Czechoslovakia	3rd	110 metres hurdles – 13.8 s

== Personal bests ==
- 100 metres – 10.5 sec
- 200 metres – 21.4 sec
- 110 meters hurdles – 13.7 sec (electronically 13.89 sec)
- 60 metres hurdlers – 7.7 (NR) (electronically 7.96 sec)
