= Marco Acerbi =

Italian hurdler (1949–1989)

Personal information
- Nationality: Italian
- Born: 29 April 1949 Aosta, Italy
- Died: 24 July 1989 (aged 40) Cervinia, Italy
- Height: 1.95 m (6 ft 5 in)
- Weight: 74 kg (163 lb)

Sport
- Country: Italy
- Sport: Athletics
- Event: 110 metres hurdles
- Club: G.S. Fiamme Gialle; Società Sportiva Metanopoli

Achievements and titles
- Personal best: 110 m hs: 13.7 (1972)

Marco Acerbi (29 April 1949 – 24 July 1989) was an Italian hurdler.

== Biography ==
Acerbi, one times national champion, has participated in the 1972 Summer Olympics, died prematurely at the age of 40 years.

After his retirement from athletics, he served as an official for the Italian Athletics Federation and founded the Valle d’Aosta Triathlon Association.

== Achievements ==
Year	Competition	Venue	Position	Event	Performance	Notes
1972	Olympic Games	(West Germany) Munich	Semi-Finals	110 m hs	14.45	

== National titles ==
- 1 win in 60 metres hurdles at the Italian Athletics Indoor Championships (1972)
