= Lubomír Nádeníček =

Czech hurdler

Medal record

Men's athletics

Representing Czechoslovakia

European Championships
Bronze medal – third place	1971 Helsinki	110 m hurdles

Lubomír Nádeníček (born 11 March 1947 in Brno) is a Czech former hurdler who competed in the 1968 Summer Olympics and in the 1972 Summer Olympics.
