= 1974 European Athletics Indoor Championships =

- Dates: 9–10 March 1974
- Host city: Gothenburg; Sweden
- Venue: Scandinavium
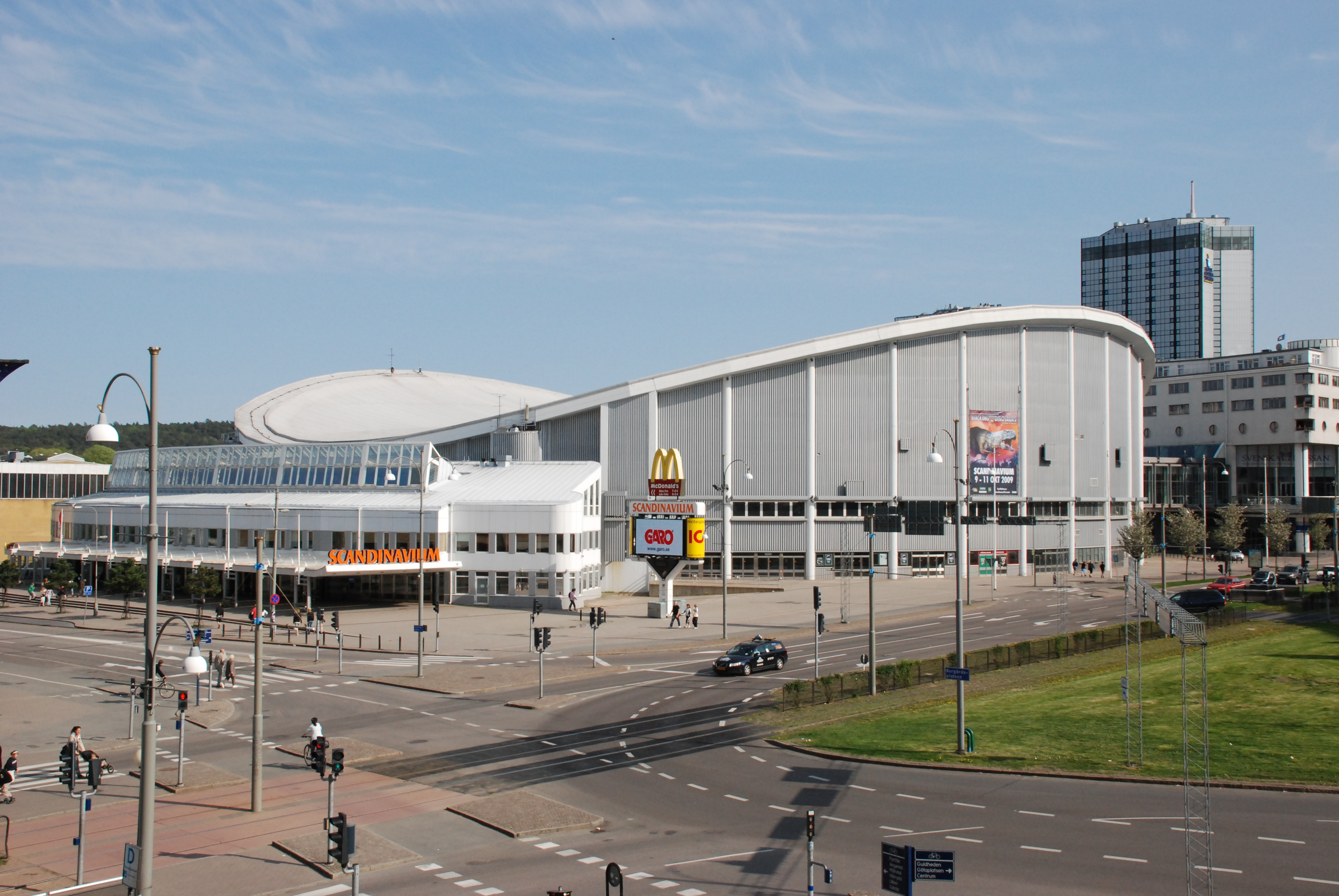
- Events: 21
- Participation: 262 athletes from 25 nations
- Records set: 8 WR, 10 CR

The 1974 European Athletics Indoor Championships were held on 9 and 10 March 1974 in Gothenburg, Sweden at the Scandinavium.

The track used for the championships was 196 metres long.

== Medal summary ==
=== Men ===
Event	Gold		Silver		Bronze	
60 metres	Valeriy Borzov (URS)	6.58 CR	Manfred Kokot (GDR)	6.63	Aleksandr Kornelyuk (URS)	6.66
400 metres	Fons Brijdenbach (BEL)	46.60	Andreas Scheibe (GDR)	46.80	Günter Arnold (GDR)	46.94
800 metres	Luciano Sušanj (YUG)	1:48.07	András Zsinka (HUN)	1:48.50	Jozef Plachý (TCH)	1:49.49
1500 metres	Henryk Szordykowski (POL)	3:41.78	Thomas Wessinghage (FRG)	3:42.02	Włodzimierz Staszak (POL)	3:43.48
3000 metres	Emiel Puttemans (BEL)	7:48.48	Paul Thijs (BEL)	7:51.76	Pavel Pěnkava (TCH)	7:51.79
60 metres hurdles	Anatoliy Moshiashvili (URS)	7.66 WR	Mirosław Wodzyński (POL)	7.68	Frank Siebeck (GDR)	7.75
4 × 392 metres relay	Sweden; Michael Fredriksson; Gert Möller; Anders Faager; Dimitre Grama	3:04.55	France; Pierre Bonvin; Patrick Salvador; Roger Vélazquez; Lionel Malingre	3:05.46	Only two starting teams	
High jump	Kęstutis Šapka (URS)	2.22	István Major (HUN)	2.20	Vladimír Malý (TCH)	2.17
Pole vault	Tadeusz Ślusarski (POL)	5.35	Antti Kalliomäki (FIN)	5.30	Jānis Lauris (URS)	5.30
Long jump	Jean-François Bonhème (FRA)	8.17	Hans Baumgartner (FRG)	8.10	Max Klauss (GDR)	8.03
Triple jump	Michał Joachimowski (POL)	17.03 WR	Mikhail Bariban (URS)	16.88	Bernard Lamitié (FRA)	16.56
Shot put	Geoff Capes (GBR)	20.95 AR CR	Heinz-Joachim Rothenburg (GDR)	20.87	Jaroslav Brabec (TCH)	19.87

=== Women ===
Event	Gold		Silver		Bronze	
60 metres	Renate Stecher (GDR)	7.16 WR	Andrea Lynch (GBR)	7.17	Irena Szewińska (POL)	7.20
400 metres	Jelica Pavličić (YUG)	52.64 CR	Nadezhda Ilyina (URS)	52.81	Waltraud Dietsch (GDR)	52.84
800 metres	Elżbieta Katolik (POL)	2:02.38 AR CR	Gisela Ellenberger (FRG)	2:02.54	Gunhild Hoffmeister (GDR)	2:02.59
1500 metres	Tonka Petrova (BUL)	4:10.97 WR	Karin Krebs (GDR)	4:11.33	Tamara Kazachkova (URS)	4:14.45
60 metres hurdles	Annerose Fiedler (GDR)	8.08	Grażyna Rabsztyn (POL)	8.08	Meta Antenen (SUI)	8.19
4 × 392 metres relay	Sweden; Ann-Charlotte Hesse; Lena Fritzson; Ann-Margret Utterberg; Ann Larsson	3:38.15	Bulgaria; Lilyana Tomova; Sonya Zachariyeva; Yordanka Filipova; Tonka Petrova	3:39.21	Only two starting teams	
High jump	Rosemarie Witschas (GDR)	1.90	Milada Karbanová (TCH)	1.88	Rita Kirst (GDR)	1.88
Long jump	Meta Antenen (SUI)	6.69 NR	Angela Schmalfeld (GDR)	6.56	Valeria Ștefănescu (ROM)	6.39
Shot put	Helena Fibingerová (TCH)	20.75 WR	Nadezhda Chizhova (URS)	20.62	Marianne Adam (GDR)	19.70

== Medal table ==
Rank	Nation	Gold	Silver	Bronze	Total
1	Poland (POL)	5	1	2	8
2	East Germany (GDR)	3	5	7	15
3	Soviet Union (URS)	3	3	3	9
4	Belgium (BEL)	2	1	0	3
5	Sweden (SWE)	2	0	0	2
5	Yugoslavia (YUG)	2	0	0	2
7	Czechoslovakia (TCH)	1	1	4	6
8	France (FRA)	1	1	1	3
9	Bulgaria (BUL)	1	1	0	2
9	Great Britain (GBR)	1	1	0	2
11	Switzerland (SUI)	1	0	1	2
12	West Germany (FRG)	0	3	0	3
13	Hungary (HUN)	0	2	0	2
14	Finland (FIN)	0	1	0	1
15	Romania (ROU)	0	0	1	1
Totals (15 entries)		22	20	19	61

== Participating nations ==
- Austria (2)
- Belgium (6)
- Bulgaria (11)
- Czechoslovakia (15)
- Denmark (5)
- East Germany (28)
- Finland (6)
- France (20)
- Great Britain (10)
- Greece (7)
- Hungary (7)
- Iceland (1)
- Ireland (1)
- Italy (11)
- Luxembourg (1)
- Netherlands (8)
- Norway (6)
- Poland (21)
- Romania (10)
- Soviet Union (31)
- Spain (7)
- Sweden (23)
- Switzerland (3)
- West Germany (21)
- Yugoslavia (2)
