= Eckart Berkes =

German hurdler (1949–2014)

Personal information
- Born: 9 February 1949 Worms, West Germany
- Died: 24 September 2014 (aged 65) Leimen, Germany

Sport
- Sport: Track and field
Medal record
Representing West Germany
European Indoor Championships
Gold medal – first place	1971 Sofia	60 m hurdles

Eckart Berkes (9 February 1949 – 24 September 2014) was a German hurdler who competed in the 1972 Summer Olympics. He was born in Worms.
