= Loránd Milassin =

Hungarian hurdler (1948–2021)

Personal information
- Nationality: Hungarian
- Born: 18 January 1948 Budapest, Hungary
- Died: 1 April 2021 (aged 73) Hungary

Sport
- Sport: Track and field
- Event: 110 metres hurdles

Loránd Milassin (18 January 1948 – 1 April 2021) was a Hungarian hurdler. He competed in the men's 110 metres hurdles at the 1972 Summer Olympics.
