= Petr Čech (hurdler) =

Czech hurdler (born 1944)

Personal information
- Nationality: Czech
- Born: 6 January 1944 Budyně nad Ohří, Protectorate of Bohemia and Moravia

Sport
- Sport: Track and field
- Event: 110 metres hurdles

Petr Čech (6 January 1944) is a Czech hurdler. He competed in the men's 110 metres hurdles at the 1972 Summer Olympics.
