= Beat Pfister =

Swiss hurdler

Personal information
- Nationality: Swiss
- Born: 5 July 1949 (age 77) Bern, Switzerland

Sport
- Sport: Track and field
- Event: 110 metres hurdles

Beat Pfister (born 5 July 1949) is a Swiss hurdler. He competed in the men's 110 metres hurdles at the 1972 Summer Olympics.
