= Anatoliy Moshiashvili =

Soviet athlete

Personal information
- Born: 11 March 1950 Kutaisi, Georgian SSR, Soviet Union
- Died: 14 August 2018 (aged 68) Serbia

Sport
- Sport: Track and field
Medal record
Representing Soviet Union
European Indoor Championships
Gold medal – first place	1974 Gothenburg	60 m hurdles
Bronze medal – third place	1972 Grenoble	50 m hurdles
Summer Universiade
Silver medal – second place	1973 Moscow	110 m hurdles

Anatoliy Moshiashvili (11 March 1950 in Kutaisi – 14 August 2018 in Serbia) was a Georgian-Soviet male former track and field hurdler who competed in the 110 metres hurdles for the Soviet Union.

His greatest achievement was a 60 metres hurdles gold medal at the 1974 European Athletics Indoor Championships, which he won in a championship record time. His winning time of 7.66 seconds still remains the Georgian national record for the event.

Among his other international performances were silver medals at the 1973 European Cup and 1973 Summer Universiade, as well as bronze medals at the 1968 European Junior Games, 1972 European Athletics Indoor Championships, and fourth place at the 1971 European Athletics Championships.

He was a five-time national champion, having won the 60 m hurdles three times straight at the Soviet Indoor Athletics Championships from 1972 to 1974, in addition to the outdoor title at the Soviet Athletics Championships in 1971 and 1973.

== International competitions ==
Year	Competition	Venue	Position	Event	Notes
1968	European Junior Games	Leipzig, East Germany	3rd	110 m hurdles	14.7
1971	European Championships	Helsinki, Finland	4th	110 m hurdles	14.36
1972	European Indoor Championships	Grenoble, France	3rd	50 m hurdles	6.59
1973	European Cup	Edinburgh, United Kingdom	2nd	110 m hurdles	13.76
1973	Universiade	Moscow, Soviet Union	2nd	110 m hurdles	13.73
1974	European Indoor Championships	Gothenburg, Sweden	1st	60 m hurdles	7.66 CR

== National titles ==
- Soviet Athletics Championships
  - 110 m hurdles: 1971, 1973
- Soviet Indoor Athletics Championships
  - 60 m hurdles: 1972, 1973, 1974

== See also ==
- List of European Athletics Indoor Championships medalists (men)
