= Marek Jóźwik =

Polish hurdler (born 1947)

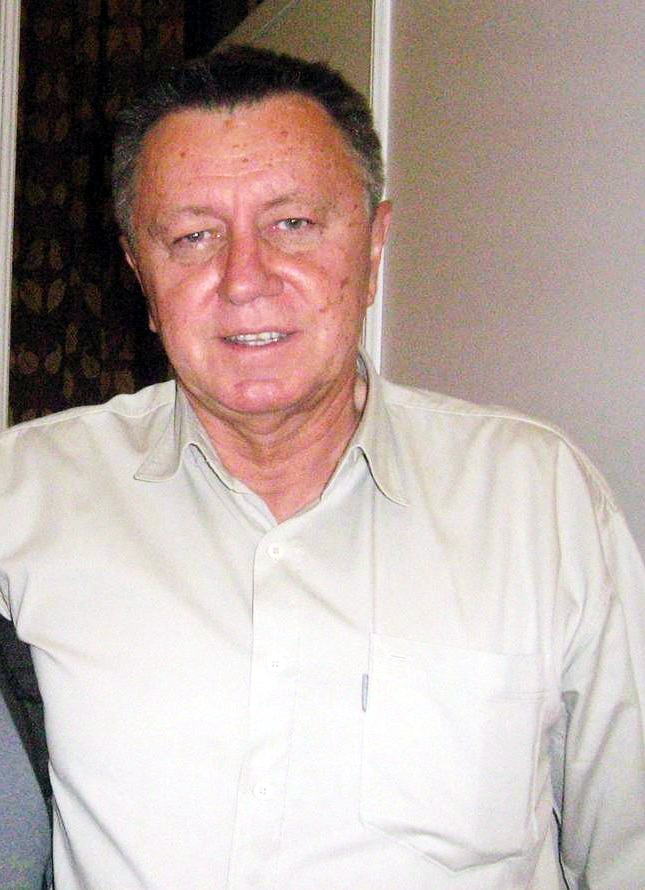
Marek Jóźwik in 2008

Marek Jan Jóźwik (born 10 April 1947 in Łódź) is a Polish former hurdler who competed in the 1972 Summer Olympics. He now works as a sports journalist and commentator for Telewizja Polska. He is also the president of the Polish Curling Association.
