= Frank Siebeck =

German hurdler

Medal record

Men's athletics

Representing East Germany

European Championships
Gold medal – first place	1971 Helsinki	110 m hurdles

European Indoor Championships
Gold medal – first place	1973 Rotterdam	60 m hurdles
Silver medal – second place	1970 Vienna	60 m hurdles
Silver medal – second place	1975 Katowice	60 m hurdles
Bronze medal – third place	1974 Gothenburg	60 m hurdles

Frank Siebeck (born 17 August 1949 in Schkeuditz) is a retired hurdler who represented East Germany. He competed for SC Leipzig.

== Achievements ==
Year	Tournament	Venue	Result	Extra
1968	European Junior Championships	Leipzig, East Germany	2nd	110 m hurdles
1970	European Indoor Championships	Vienna, Austria	2nd	60 m hurdles
1971	European Championships	Helsinki, Finland	1st	110 m hurdles
1972	Olympic Games	Munich, West Germany	5th	110 m hurdles
1973	European Indoor Championships	Rotterdam, Netherlands	1st	60 m hurdles
1974	European Indoor Championships	Gothenburg, Sweden	3rd	60 m hurdles
1974	European Championships	Rome, Italy	8th	110 m hurdles
1975	European Indoor Championships	Katowice, Poland	2nd	60 m hurdles
