= Manfred Schumann =

West German hurdler and bobsledder

Personal information
- Born: 7 February 1951 (age 75) Hanover, Germany
- Height: 186 cm (6 ft 1 in)
- Weight: 86 kg (190 lb)

Sport
- Country: West Germany
- Sport: Athletics, Bobsleigh
Medal record
Representing West Germany
Men's athletics
European Indoor Championships
Silver medal – second place	1972 Grenoble	50 m hurdles
European Junior Championships
Bronze medal – third place	1970 Colombes	4 x 100 m relay
Men's bobsleigh
Olympic Games
Silver medal – second place	1976 Innsbruck	Two-man
Bronze medal – third place	1976 Innsbruck	Four-man
World Championships
Gold medal – first place	1974 St. Moritz	Four-man
Silver medal – second place	1979 Königssee	Two-man
Bronze medal – third place	1977 St. Moritz	Two-man

Manfred Schumann (born 7 February 1951 in Hanover) is a West German hurdler and bobsledder who competed during the mid to late 1970s. He won two medals at the 1976 Winter Olympics in Innsbruck with a silver in the two-man and a bronze in the four-man events.

== Biography ==
Schumann won a complete set of medals at the FIBT World Championships with a gold in 1974 (Four-man), a silver in 1979 (Two-man, despite being replaced by Fritz Ohlwärter after Schumann's injury during the third heat), and a bronze in 1977.
