= Günther Nickel =

German hurdler

Personal information
- Born: 24 March 1946 (age 80) Munich, West Germany

Sport
- Sport: Track and field
Medal record
Representing West Germany
European Indoor Championships
Gold medal – first place	1970 Vienna	60m hurdles
Summer Universiade
Silver medal – second place	1970 Turin	110m hurdles

Günther Nickel (born 24 March 1946) is a German former hurdler who competed in the 1972 Summer Olympics.
