= Asaba (disambiguation) =

Asaba is the capital city of Delta State, Nigeria.

Asaba may also refer to:

== People ==
- Asaba (singer) (born 1992), Cameroonian singer, songwriter, vocalist and a professional nurse
- Asaba Ruyonga, Ugandan politician
- Carl Asaba (born 1973), English footballer
- Katsumi Asaba (浅葉 克己; born 1940), Japanese art director
- Akira Asaba (麻羽 央), a character in the manga series Magical Trans!

== Places ==
- Asaba-Asa, a town in Nigeria's Delta State
- Asaba-Assay, a town in the Nigeria Delta State
- Asaba, Shizuoka, town in Japan
- Asaba International Airport, an international airport located in Asaba and the whole of the Delta State, Nigeria

== Others ==
- Asaba Declaration a declaration issued by the 17 Southern governors in Nigeria
- Asaba massacre a massacre occurred in Nigeria during the Nigerian Civil War
- Asaba language, a language in Papua New Guinea
- Asaba 2022 Sports Festival
