= Federal Highway System of Nigeria =

Road network in Nigeria

The Federal Highway System of Nigeria also known as Trunk A national roads connects economic and political centers within the country, in addition it links Nigeria with its neighboring countries. These roads are constructed and maintained by the Federal Government of Nigeria through the Federal Ministry of Works and the Federal Roads Maintenance Agency. In 1974, some roads previously maintained by the states were transferred to the Federal Government, this created a classification called Trunk F roads.

As at April 2003, federal roads constitute 17% of the total road network in Nigeria.

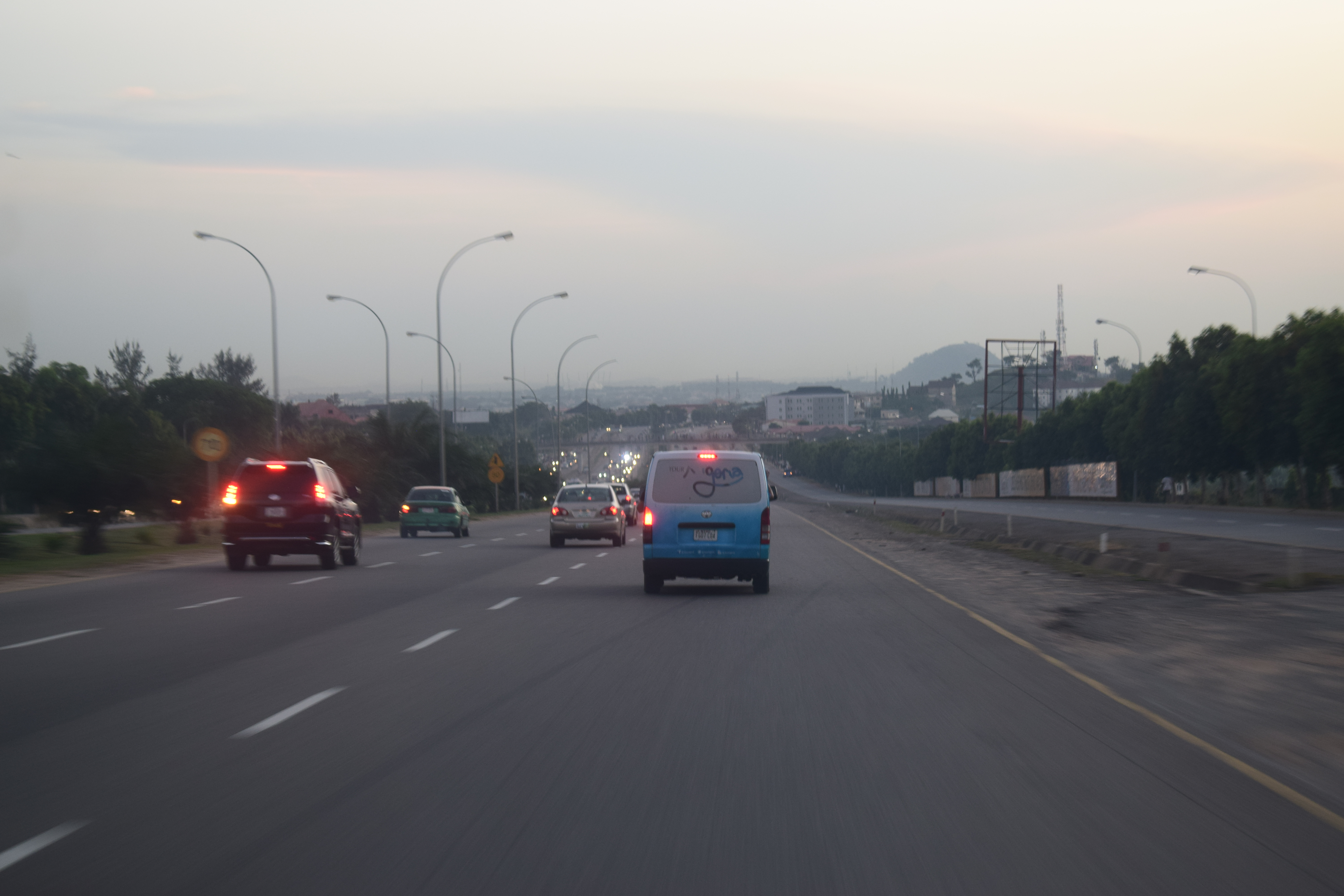
Cars on the A234 Abuja, Nigeria

== History ==
The development of a road network to be designed at a minimum set of standards began in 1926 after a Roads Board was inaugurated. The plan was to coordinate the existing roads to become a network linked with secondary roads. The routes were inter-regional from North-South and East-West and connecting commodity production centers with railways stations and the ports. Between 1900s and 1920s, colonial roads were developed sometimes over existing straightened and cleared footpaths that were previously used for trade. Among those built include were, Lagos - Ibadan, Ibadan - Ijebu-Ode, roads linking Ilesha, Akure, Ondo, Benin and Sapele in the west and after a ferry transport at Asaba, the West links with roads in Onitsha, Owerri and Enugu in the East. In the Northern Province, roads linking Zaria and Sokoto, Jos - Bauchi and Kano with Katsina were also built. The roads were usually termed Class III roads and built by the Public Works Department according to the minimum standards of design. In the 1930s, the following roads were budgeted for. Kishi to Ilorin, Mamfe to Bamenda, Lokoja-Jalingo-Yola, Yelwa to Bida and Gombe-Biu-Yola.

From 1946 till 1960, a significant level of investment was dedicated to the road networks. A new classification designated Trunk A roads as federal roads, Trunk B as regional roads and Trunk C as roads managed by the Native Authorities. After independence, road development was a significant item in the First, Second and Third National Development Plans. Between 1970 and 1980 during the implementation of the Second and Third plans, tremendous investment was diverted to the road sector leading to road standards with posted speeds of 100 km/h (62 mph) more than the previous 56–80 km/h (35–50 mph). In 1978, the opening of the four lane dual Lagos-Ibadan expressway, marked the first expressway in the country. Improvements were also made in design with carriageway widths of 7.3 metres (24 ft) and shoulder widths on each side at 2.75 metres (9 ft 0 in). The increase in new mileage to roads also brought concerns about building and construction standards of the roads as financing was spread to maximize the number of miles to be constructed. Rehabilitated and constructed roads may not be able to maintain standards with high traffic especially from axle loads on roads lacking weighbridges, causing in degraded pavements.

From the 1980s to the end of the 1990s, the challenges of maintaining roads became pronounced as disrepair such as cracks, gullies, potholes, poor markings and depressed road surfaces was evident in a number of roads .

== Design standards ==
Highway design and standards are published by the Federal Ministry of Works in the Highway Manual Volume I and II.

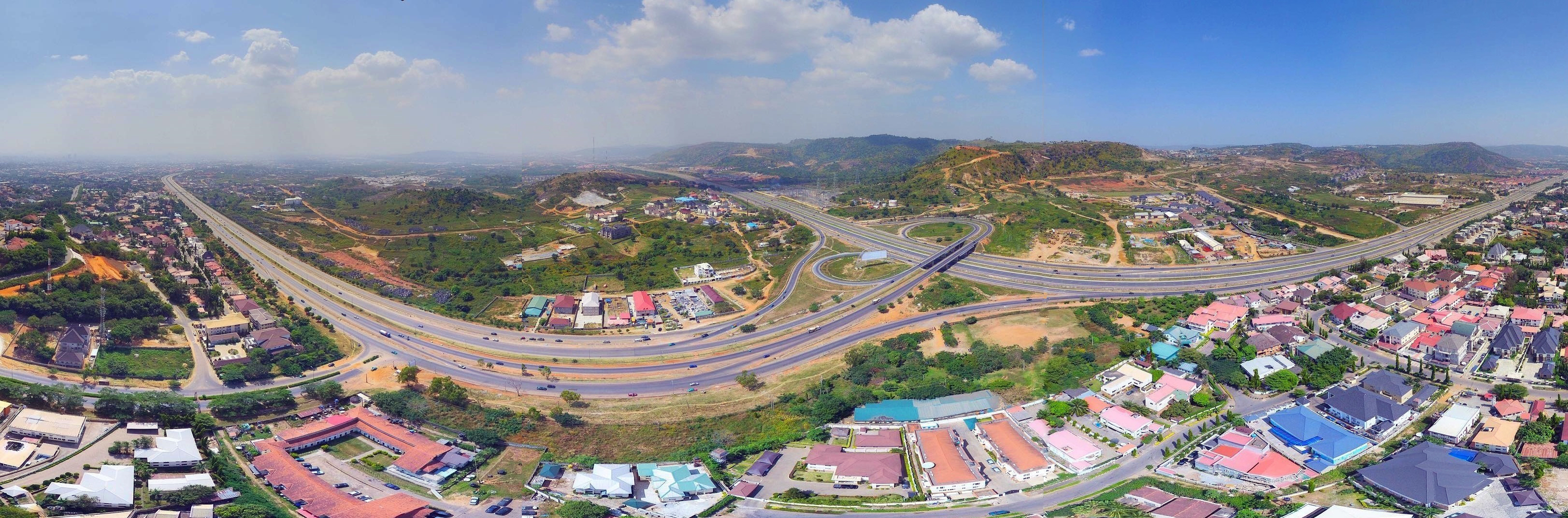
Abuja Highway Panoramic

== Selected highways ==
Highways
Link	Route	Type	Posted Speed	Interchange
A2	Abuja - Kaduna -Kano	Four lane, dual carriageway	100kmh	Rigachukwu (Abuja to Kaduna) First Roundabout, Kano (Kaduna - Kano)
A121/A232	Shagamu - Benin - Asaba	Four lane, dual carriageway	100kmh	Shagamu junction, Benin Bypass
A3-1	Enugu - Port-Harcourt	Dual carriageway		
A232	Onitsha - Enugu	Dual carriageway		Upper Iweka (Onitsha)
A234	Keffi - Akwanga			
E1	Lagos - Ibadan		100kmh	Ojota (Lagos)
A2	Okene-Lokoja-Abuja			
A6	Onitsha - Owerri			

== Executive and regulatory bodies ==
=== Federal Ministry of Works. ===
The ministry is the executive body charged with preparing the maintenance, rehabilitation, and construction budgets of federal roads in the country. It also manages and sets design standards for federal roads. It is headed by a minister who is assisted by a permanent secretary and directors of professional departments.

=== Federal Road Maintenance Agency (FERMA) ===
Ferma is a statutory body supervised by the Federal Ministry of Works. It was formed to relieve the Ministry of Works of routine road monitoring and maintenance.

=== Federal Road Safety Commission (FRSC) ===
FRSC is the federal body that regulates and maintains road safety in Nigeria.

=== Infrastructure Concession Regulatory Commission ===
ICRC regulates and supervises the private concession of roads and other infrastructures in Nigeria.
