= Oshimili South =

Oshimili South Local Government Council
- LGA
- Interactive map of Oshimili South Local Government Council
- Country: Nigeria
- State: Delta State
- Date of Creation: 1996
- Headquarters: Asaba

Government
  - Type: Local Government
  - Executive Chairman: Ezenyili Kelvin Obi

Population (2006)
  - Total: 150,034
- Time zone: UTC+1 (WAT)
- National language: Enuani
- Website: www.oslgc.dl.gov.ng

Oshimili South Local Government Area is one of the twenty-five Local Government Areas making up Delta State. Oshimili South is situated in the Niger Delta region of southern Niger .It is situated in the Niger Delta Region/the South-South geo-political zone of Nigeria. Oshimili South has its headquarters at Asaba.

This LGA has a total population of 150,034 as at the 2006 census.

== Cities, Towns and Communities ==
- Abala
- Agu
- Akpako
- Asaba (headquarters and main town)
- Anwai
- Cable Point
- Elenchele
- Iyiba
- Obiofu
- Odifulu
- Ogbele
- Oko Amakom
- Oko Anala
- Okogbele
- Okwe
- Otuogu
- Ugbomanta Quarters
- Umuaji
- Umuezei
- Umuonaje
- West End

== Notable people ==
- Phillip Asiodu, Nigerian diplomat, bureaucrat, and former Minister of Petroleum.
- Epiphany Azinge, the 14th Asagba of Asaba, a prominent legal scholar, Senior Advocate of Nigeria, and former Director General of the Nigerian Institute of Advanced Legal Studies.
- Stella Damasus, award-winning Nollywood actress, singer and philanthropist.
- Awele Maduemezia, late physicist and former vice-Chancellor of Ambrose Alli University.
- Frank Nwachukwu Ndili, first Nigerian nuclear physicist, former Vice-Chancellor of the University of Nigeria, Nsukka (UNN).
- Emmanuel Nwanze, prominent Nigerian biochemist and former vice-Chancellor of University of Benin (UNIBEN).
- Sonny Odogwu, billionaire industrialist and founder of SIO Group.
