= Odogwu (surname) =

Odogwu is a surname. Notable people with the surname include:

- Paolo Odogwu (born 1997), British rugby union player
- Raphael Odogwu (born 1991), Italian footballer
- Sunny Odogwu (1931–2018), Nigerian businessman
- Violet Odogwu (born 1942), Nigerian track and field athlete
