= Ogbe-Ogonogo Modern Market =

Market in Asaba Delta State

Ogbe-Ogonogo Modern Market, Asaba
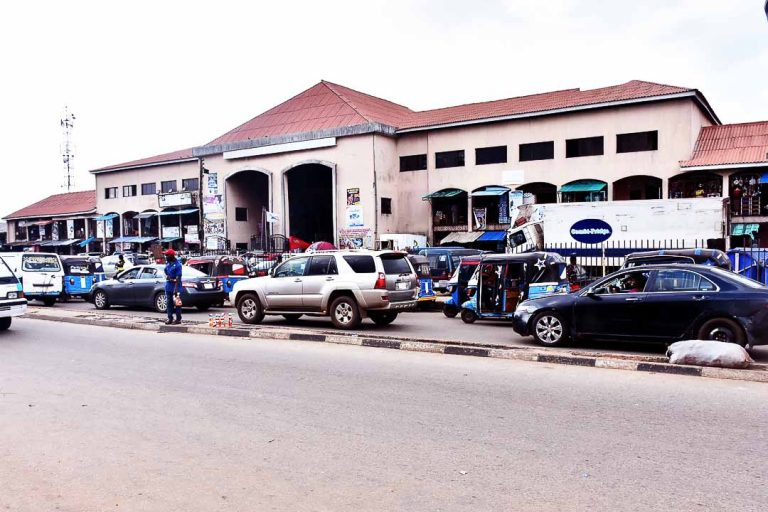
- Location: Nnebisi road, Asaba, Delta State.; Asaba
- Management: Oshimili South Local Government
- Owner: Oshimili South Local Government
- Days normally open: Everyday/Nkwo market day
- Interactive map of Ogbe-Ogonogo Modern Market, Asaba
- Ogbe-Ogonogo Modern Market Asaba is one of the biggest market in Delta Central senatorial district

Ogbe-Ogonogo Modern Market is referred to as one of the biggest market in Delta State and the biggest market in Asaba where food items, clothes and other things are sold and bought at a cheaper rate.

== About Ogbe-Ogonogo Market ==
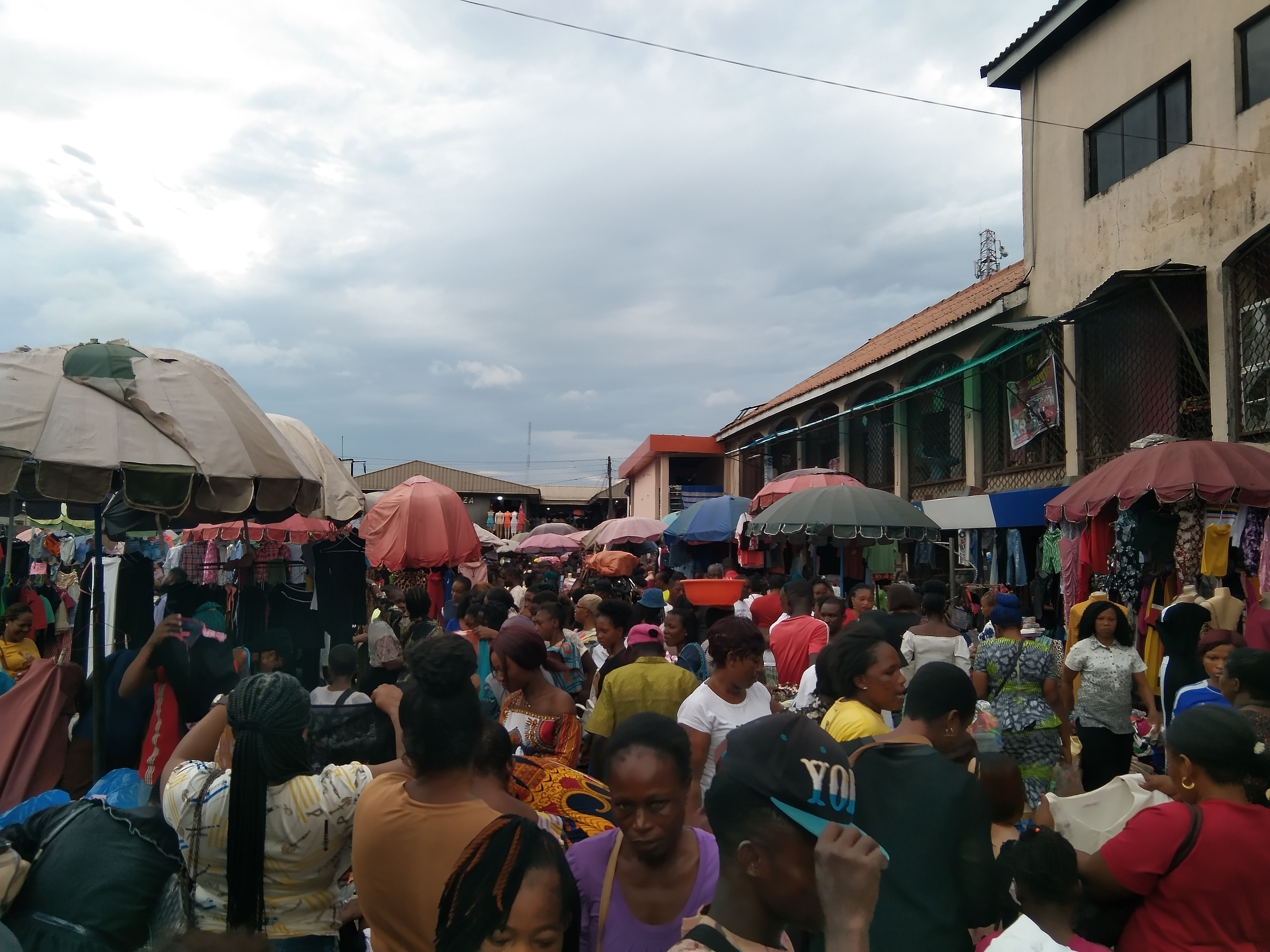
Part of Ogbe-Ogonogo Market Asaba

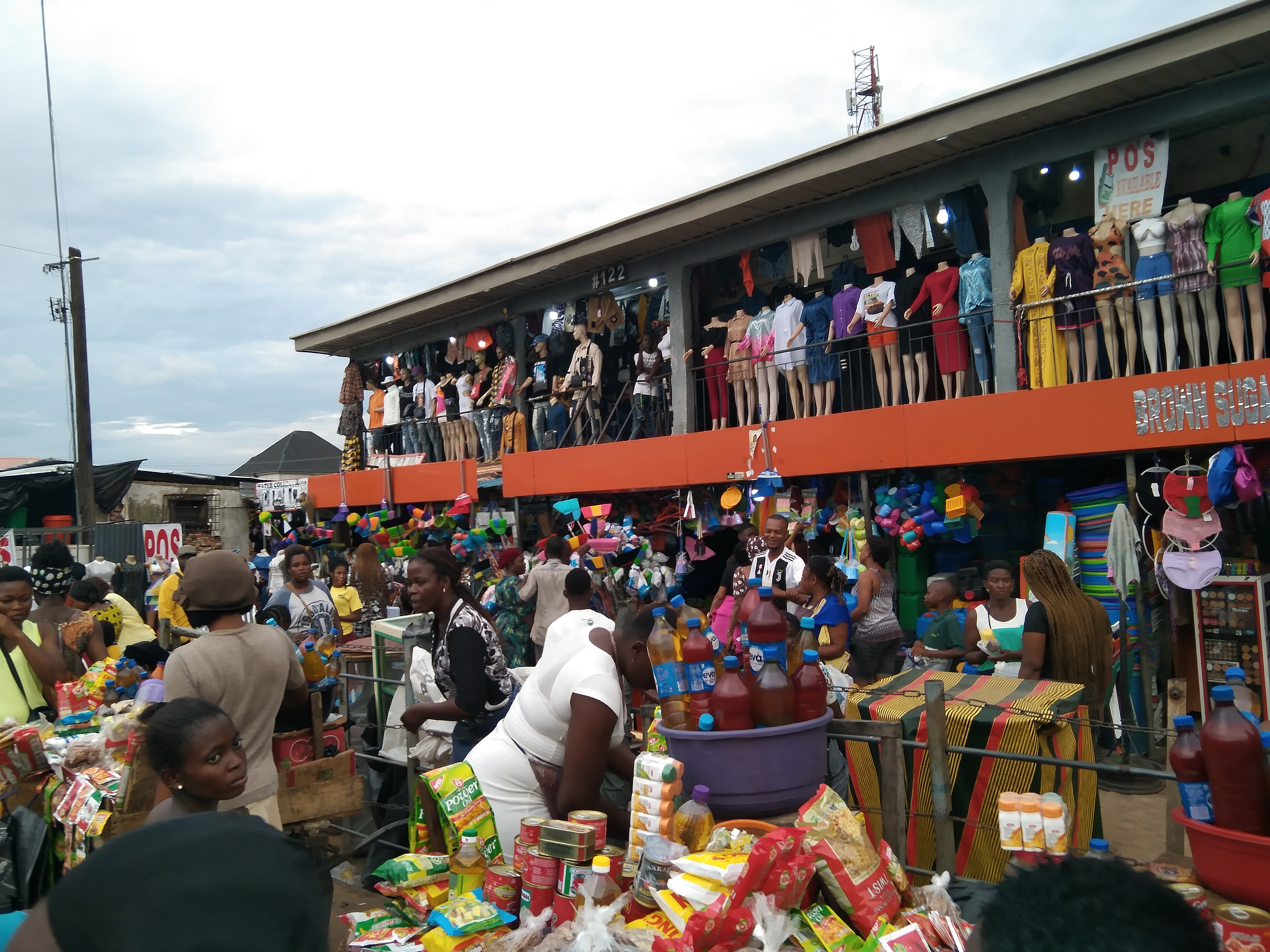
Part of Ogbe-Ogonogo Market Asaba

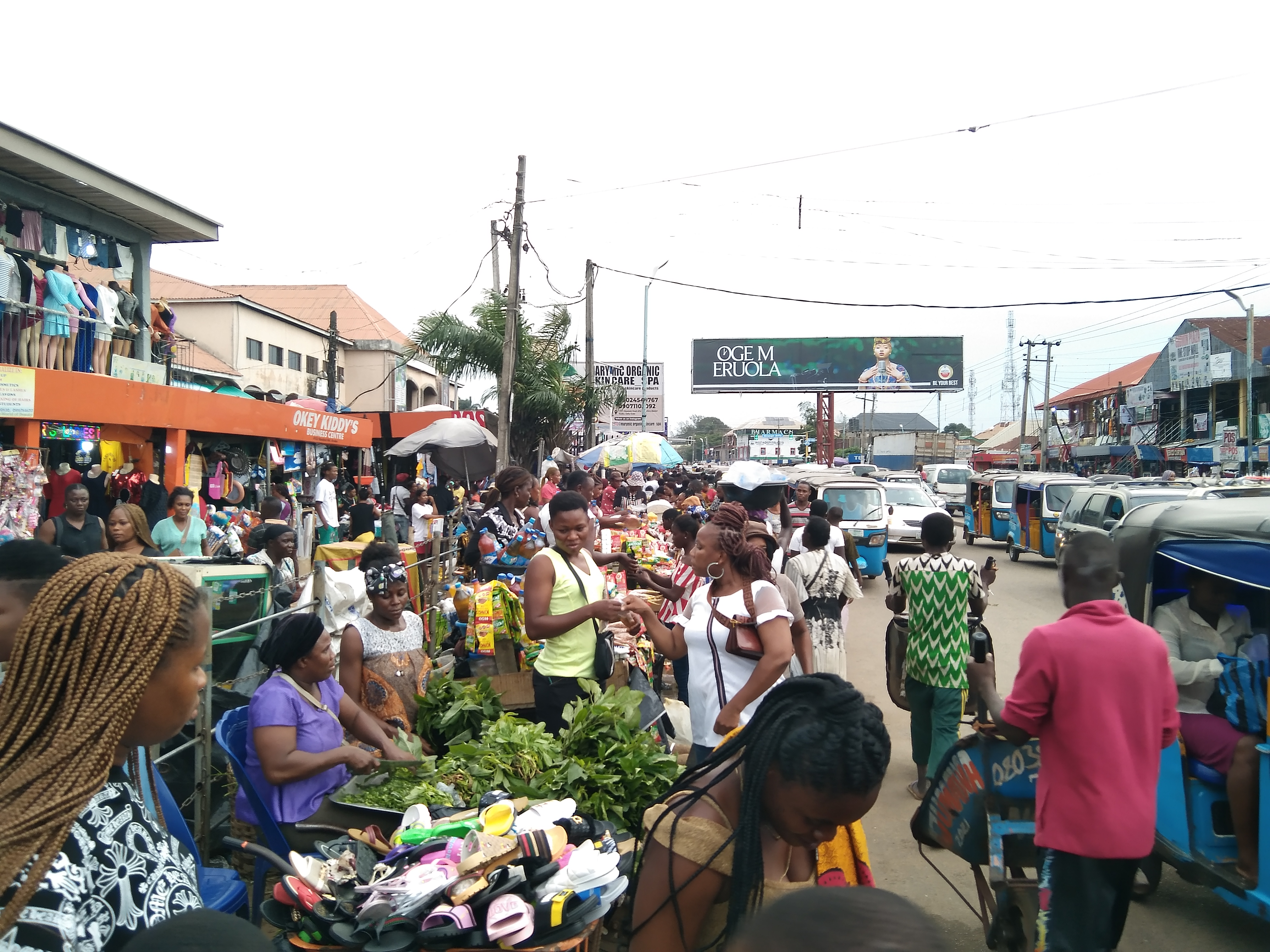
Outside Ogbe-Ogonogo Market Asaba

Ogbe-Ogonogo Market operates every day, and unlike a normal market, the market has a "market day" which is "Nkwo market day" and it is being counted every four days. Farmers and traders comes to display their products and farm produce every day especially on the market day. The market has over one thousand traders and attracts large crowds of daily customers from different parts of areas including people from Onitsha. The market is being managed by the Oshimili South Local Government.

== Ogbe-Ogonogo Market Fire Incident 2020 ==
Parts of the Ogbe-Ogonogo market Asaba was razed by fire in the early hours of Tuesday 26 May 2020. The fire which started around 7am destroyed the entire livestock section and part of the tailoring materials section. No human casualty was recorded in the fire incident although Several properties worth millions of Naira were destroyed.

The governor of Delta State Senator Dr Ifeanyi A Okowa, who visited the market to inspect the extent of damage caused by the fire, assured that the state government would assist the traders affected to get back to their businesses.

During a sympathy visit to Delta State, the Honourable Minister of Humanitarian Affairs, Disaster Management and Social Development, Sadiya Umar Farouq, handed over relief materials to the Delta State Government and also flagged off the distribution of the materials to the victims of the fire incident.

== See also ==
- Main Market, Onitsha
- Oshimili South
