= Ozara, Enugu State =

Ozara (Ozalla) is a prominent town in Nkanu West Local Government Area of Enugu State, Nigeria.

Although the town officially goes with the colonial spelling "Ozalla", the correct form "Ozara" is the most widely used linguistic form by the natives in their Ozara dialect of Igbo language.

Ozalla people are descendants of Okpatu-Oke in present-day Udi LGA.

Ozalla is bordered to the north by Akegbe-Ugwu, to the east by Obe, to the west by Udi and to the south by Ituku, with which it shares the University of Nigeria Teaching Hospital (UNTH) landscape.

Ozalla is often referred to as the gateway to Nkanu land because of its strategic location along the major access roads to this region.

Ozalla is known for the prominent Four Corners junction along the Enugu Port-Harcourt Expressway. However, locals often refer to the old Four-Corners near Afor-Agu Market and Ozalla High School

Ozalla is made up of 6 villages: Amigbo, Amechi, Ezzi, Enugu-Egu, Umuokorouba and Obeagwu.

In 2002, Ozalla was split into five administrative units (autonomous communities):

Ishi-Ozalla

Etiti-Ozalla

Okorouba-Ozalla

Obeagwu-Ozalla and

Umuanee-Ozalla.

Prior to this, Ozalla had one traditional ruler, which the Chukwuani family from Amigbo held for decades, but currently each autonomous community has an "Igwe".

Ozalla people are predominantly Christians, with a Catholic majority. Other Christian denominations like Anglican, Apostolic Pentecostal, Sabbath, and several others abound. Fewer people currently practice the traditional religion.

Ozalla has a river that runs across the town called the Ufamu, which remains the major source of water supply for the inhabitants.

Ani Ozalla in Amigbo is the home of Oji-Ngenani, the ancestral capital of Ozalla, where live fowl is usually offered to crocodiles by the high priest on behalf of people who come to seek help for various purposes.

In recent years, Ani Ozalla has been a major tourist attraction for visitors coming to Ozalla.

== OZALLA, IGBO-ETITI ==
This is another town in Enugu State that bears the same name as (Ozalla) but is located in a different local government area. Ozalla in Igbo-Etiti LGA has two autonomous communities, which are Ozalla Uwenu and Ozalla Uwani. It is made up of six villages namely:

- Nnaru
- Isiamelu
- Ikolo
- Akaibite
- Ijo
- Ujoma
