= Asaba 2022 Sports Festival =

Asaba 2022 Sports Festival also known as the National Sports Festival of Nigeria is a biennial multi-sport event organized by the Federal Government of Nigeria through the National Sports Commission for athletes from the 36 States and the Federal Capital Territory of Nigeria.

== History ==
The National Sport Festival can be traced back to its debut in 1973 in Lagos State. The major aim of the festival is to foster unity and ensure talent development in sports in the country.

The festival is also known to be called Nigeria's version of the Olympic Games. The festival for 2022 was the 21st edition of the competition and it was hosted at the Stephen Keshi Stadium in Asaba, the capital of Delta state.

== Festival activities ==
The National Sport Festival tagged Asaba 2022 was scheduled to hold from November 8, 2022, to December 10, 2022. The flag off of the Torch of Unity for the festival was done by President Muhammadu Buhari at the Presidential villa in Abuja.

The Governor of Delta State, Dr. Ifeanyi Okowa received the torch of Unity from the Minister of Youth and Sports Development, Sunday Dare after the troch of Unity had toured the entire 36 states of the federation including the Federal Capital Territory.

Some of the activities in the festival includes running, Scrabble games, basketball, handball, volleyball, swimming, cycling, wrestling, judo, Karate, kickboxing, cricket and many other sports included in the Olympic Games. It was reported that over 15,00 athletics participated in the festival in Asaba.

== Host selection ==
Delta state won the bid to host this years version of the festival at the end of the last edition which was held in Benin city, Edo State.

== Tournament medal table ==
At the end of the 21st edition, team Delta topped the medal table winning 320 gold medal, 200 silver medals and 128 bronze medals.

Team Bayelsa came second in the medal table followed by Team Edo which came third in the medal table.

Final Medals Standing
States	Gold	Silver	Bronze	Total	Position
Delta	320	200	128	648	1st
Bayelsa	132	115	90	337	2nd
Edo	78	94	167	339	3rd
Oyo	50	51	62	163	4th
Lagos	41	57	74	172	5th
Rivers	35	57	117	209	6th
kano	19	27	30	76	7th
Ogun	15	18	37	70	8th
FCT	15	11	33	59	9th
Akwa Ibom	14	15	33	62	10th
Imo	12	8	25	45	11th
Abia	10	11	20	41	12th
Ondo	9	25	47	81	13th
Anambra	6	9	24	39	14th
Cross River	6	6	6	18	15th
Plateau	4	12	26	42	16th
Osun	4	12	13	29	17th
Kwara	4	8	37	49	18th
Niger	3	6	5	14	19th
Kaduna	3	5	9	17	20th
Benue	3	1	3	7	21st
Kastina	2	4	9	15	22nd
Borno	2	1	7	10	23rd
Yobe	1	3	3	7	24th
Kogi	1	2	3	6	25th
Enugu	1	1	7	9	26th
Adamawa	1	0	3	4	27th
Nasarawa	0	7	13	20	28th
Bauchi	0	6	10	16	29th
Ebonyi	0	5	4	9	30th
Kebbi	0	4	6	10	31st
Ekiti	0	4	3	7	32nd
Taraba	0	2	6	8	33rd
Jigawa	0	2	3	5	34th
Sokoto	0	1	2	3	35th
Gombe	0	0	6	6	36th
Zamfara	0	0	0	0	37th
Total	791	790	1071	2652	
