= Asagba of Asaba =

Traditional leader of Asaba, Nigeria

The Asagba of Asaba is the traditional leader of Asaba, Delta State in the South-south of Nigeria. The office of the ruler of is an official post recognized by Governor of Delta State and the Federal Government of Nigeria.

The Asagba is the representative of the people of Ahaba to the state and federal levels of government. The current Asagba is Prof. Epiphany Azinge.

== Culture and practices ==
During official meetings with the council or distinguished guests, the Asagba of Asaba enters the palace arena, and all present rise to their feet in a gesture of deep respect. He is always beautifully adorned in regal traditional attire and beads, reflecting his esteemed status. By his side is his wife, elegantly dressed in Akwa Ocha, the iconic white cloth that represents purity, dignity, and is the native attire of the Asaba people and Western Igbo. Upon his entrance, it is customary for those present to greet him with loud chants of ‘Nna Agu! Nna Agu! Nna Agu!’ or ‘Asagba Ahaba Agu!’ repeated three times, a traditional salutation honoring him as the ‘Father Lion’ and symbol of strength, wisdom, and leadership. (Note: The traditional white cloth of the wife to the Asagba is called akwa ocha in their native Igbo language)

== Succession and Rotational Leadership ==
Before 1924, the Asagba stool was determined by a winner-takes-all model, where succession followed the principle of survival of the fittest among eligible royal lineages. It was a period of intense rivalry among powerful quarters and families, without a defined system of rotation. Influential figures such as Inalu of Umuagu, Onyebuchi of Umuezei, and Afadia of Umuaji were among the leading contenders for the throne. Inalu, in particular, was widely regarded as Eze ka Eze (the greatest of all the rival Ezes) and would have likely emerged king had it not been for the fierce competition. His dominance led to the popular but mistaken belief that he was the first Asagba of Asaba.

During this era, the Umuaji quarter produced three Asagbas, Umuagu produced two, while Ugbomanta and Umuonaje produced one each. The Ezenei quarter did not produce any ruler in that era. At the time, succession was purely a matter of power dynamics and community support, with no legal framework or rotational principles guiding the process.

This unregulated model prompted eventual government intervention. To promote equity and reduce tension among the royal quarters, the government introduced a formal rotational system. The rotation was to proceed from one quarter to another, beginning with the lineage of the first son. This new structure brought clarity and balance to the traditional institution.

This structured rotation began with Obi Nwokolo from Umuezei, followed by Obi Ijeh from Ugbomanta, then Obi Emenashi Odita from Umuagu, Obi Okocha Nwokolo from Umuaji, and finally Obi Umejei Onyetenu from Umuonaje—thus completing the first cycle of rotation.

The second cycle commenced with the selection of Obi Prof. Joseph Chike Edozien, CFR, JP, from Umuezei in 1991. Following his passing in 2024, the succession, according to the established rotational system, passed to the Ugbomanta quarter with the emergence of Obi Prof. Epiphany Azinge, SAN, OON.

This rotational framework is codified in the Bendel State Edict of 1979 on Asagbaship, which outlines the rules governing the traditional institution and succession to the Asagba throne. The Edict and oral traditions jointly affirm that while Asaba may have had more than twelve rulers historically, modern succession is now bound by legal and cultural consensus to ensure fairness and stability among the five royal quarters of Asaba: Umuezei, Ugbomanta, Umuagu, Umuaji, and Umuonaje.

== List of Asagba of Asaba ==
- Obi Nenmor Umuagu 1780
- Obi Ofordu Umuagu 1790
- Obi Diali Umuonaje 1820
- Obi Monu Umuaji 1850
- Obi Nwani Ugbomanta 1870
- Obi Egbola Umuaji 1890
- Obi Onyemenam Umuaji 1910
- Obi Nwokolo Umuezei 1925–1932
- Obi Ijeh Ugbomanta 1937–1948
- Obi Emenashi Odita Umuagu 1950–1958
- Obi Okocha Nwokolo Umuaji 1962–1963
- Obi Umejei Onyetenu Umuonaje 1964–1988
- Obi Prof. Joseph Chike Edozien Umuezei 1991–2024
- Obi Prof. Epiphany Azinge Ugbomanta 2024–present
