= Epiphany Azinge =

Nigerian traditional ruler

HRM Asagba Prof His Royal Majesty Prof Epiphany Chigbogu Azinge OON, SAN

Director General, Nigerian Institute of Advanced Legal Studies
- In office 2009–2014

Personal details
- Born: November 13, 1957 (age 68) Aba
- Education: University of Lagos; University of London; London School of Economics

His Royal Majesty Asagba Prof Epiphany Chigbogu Azinge, SAN, (born 13 November 1957) is the current Asagba of Asaba and a renowned Nigerian legal luminary and academic. He served as the 5th Director-General of the Nigerian Institute of Advanced Legal Studies between 2009 and 2014. He is a Judge at the Commonwealth Arbitral Tribunal sitting in London, where he represents Nigeria and Africa. He is the founder and senior partner at Azinge & Azinge, a law firm in Abuja where his wife Valerie Azinge (also a SAN) is also a partner. He emerged Asagba in 2024 following the passing of his predecessor, Prof. Joseph Chike Edozien. He holds the national honour of Officer of the Order of the Niger (OON) and is widely regarded as a symbol of intellectual excellence and cultural leadership within Nigeria and across the African continent.

== Education ==
Epiphany had his secondary education at Sanit Patrick's College, Asaba from 1970 to 1975. He studied law at the University of Lagos in 1976 and graduated with a Bachelor of Laws. He was called to the Nigerian Bar in 1980. He proceeded to the University of London for his master's degree in comparative constitutional law and shipping law in 1983. He proceeded to the London School of Economics for his Ph.D. His thesis was on Electoral Laws in Nigeria. In June 2015, he was appointed a member of the Commonwealth Secretariat Arbitral Tribunal (CSAT) for a period of four years. He was re-appointed for another term of four years in 2019.

== Career ==
He started his career as a lecturer at the University of Benin, and then at the University of Abuja, where he introduced the information technology law in Nigeria in 1996. He also lectured at the Nasarawa State University. He was appointed Special Assistant to the Honourable Attorney General of the Federation and Minister of Justice, Michael Ashikodi Agbamuche where he served from 1991 to 1997. He was promoted to the status of a Senior Advocate of Nigeria in 2006. He was the Director-General of the Nigerian Institute of Advanced Legal Studies from 2009 to 2014.

On 18 August 2024, Azinge emerged as 14th Asagba of Asaba designate ahead of other titled sons of the town. Until his emergence, he held a traditional chieftaincy title of the Okilolo of Asaba.

The Asagba of Asaba is the traditional leader of Asaba, Delta State in the South-south of Nigeria. He will succeed Prof. Joseph Chike Edozien, the 13th Asagba of Asaba, who joined his ancestors on 7 February 2024 Asagba of Asaba

== Recognitions ==
Azinge was awarded honorary LLD in 2013 by the Commonwealth University, Belize. In 2014 he was decorated with the national honour of Officer of the Order of the Niger (OON) by President Goodluck Jonathan. He is a fellow of the Nigerian Institute of Advanced Legal Studies.

== Personal life ==
Azinge is an indigene of Asaba, Nigeria. He is married to Dr. Valerie Azinge, SAN and they have four children together.
