= Second Niger bridge =

Nigerian bridge across Niger river

Second Niger Bridge
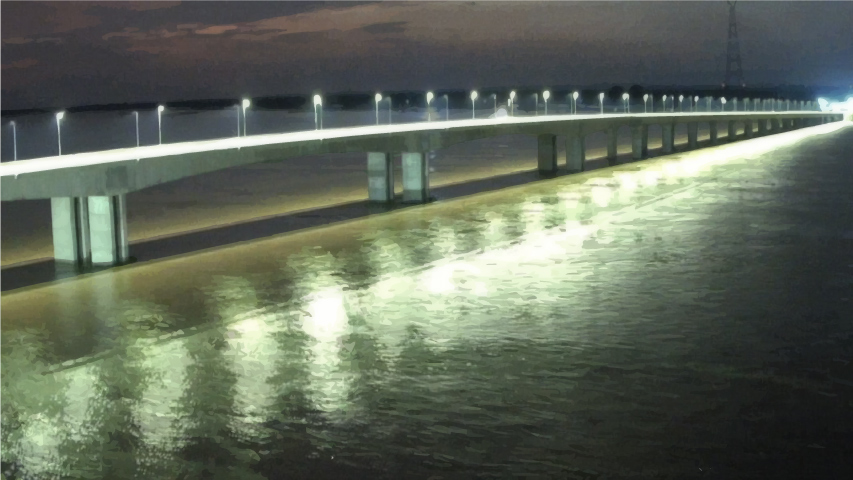
- Second Niger bridge in Oct, 2022
- Coordinates: 6°07′12″N 6°45′18″E
- Locale: Asaba, Nigeria
- Maintained by: Federal Ministry of Works and Housing
- Website: www.second-river-niger-bridge.com

Characteristics
- Total length: 1.63 km (1.01 mi)

History
- Construction start: September 1, 2018
- Construction end: May 23, 2023
- Construction cost: ₦336 Billion
- Inaugurated: May 2023; 3 years ago

Location
- Interactive map of Second Niger Bridge

The Second Niger bridge is a Nigerian Federal Government project that is 1.6 km (0.99 mi) long and furnished with other ancillary infrastructure including a 10.3 km (6.4 mi) highway, Owerri interchange and a toll station all at Obosi city near Onitsha, inaugurated in March 2022. It opened for local traffic on December 15, 2022.

== Location and situation ==
The Second Niger Bridge crosses the Niger between the cities of Asaba the capital of Delta State which is rich in oil in the west and Onitsha in the east. It is the last bridge over the Niger River before it branches into its delta arms. The Niger is the third longest river in Africa after the Nile and the Congo. It moves 7,000 m^{3}/s water at Onitsha, which is more than a hundred times as much as the Thames in London (65 m^{3}/s) and almost three times as much as the Missouri river (2,450 m^{3}/s) before reaching St. Louis. The Niger also separates Nigeria's populous southwest from the oil-rich southeast. The currently only bridge at Onitsha, a 1960s steel truss structure with two lanes, is hopelessly overloaded, due in no small part to the fact that it must accommodate flying traders, handcart drivers, cargo-carrying people and the occasional herd of goats in addition to (and between) cars.

The phrase Second Niger Bridge, may sound misleading as there are already seven major bridges over the Niger in Nigeria alone (not to mention in countries like Niger or Benin). It is therefore also known as the Second Onitsha Bridge.

== Financing ==
The project was funded through the Presidential Infrastructure Development Fund (PIDF) created by President Muhammadu Buhari and managed by the NSIA.

PIDF was also used to fund the construction of Lagos-Ibadan expressway and the Abuja-Kaduna-Kano-Road

== Statistics ==
For the almost completed bridge (as of June 2022),

- 14,000 tonnes of steel were processed (which is nearly double as much iron as in the Eiffel tower),
- 250,000 tonnes of concrete were poured (which is a little less than Trump tower in Chicago at 310,000 tons),
- 1,468 workers were employed on the construction site itself (on site) and another 8,000 elsewhere,
- 8,700,000 man-hours were accounted for and yet 2.5 years were worked without an accident.

The structure, 1,590 m long in total, consists of two parallel prestressed concrete box girder bridges, each 14.5 m wide. The current bridges will have a length of 630 m with 5 spans with span widths of 150 m maximum. The western ramp bridge will be 755 m long and the eastern ramp bridge will be 205 m long. The bridge has been constructed using the cantilever method, while the ramp bridges will be constructed using the incremental launching method.

== History ==
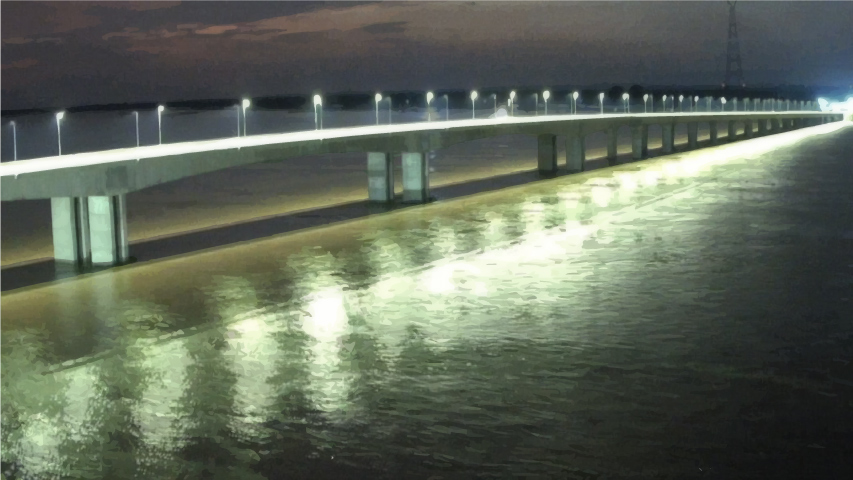
Second Niger bridge at Onitsha, october 2022

The Second Niger Bridge was first proposed during the 1958/69 political campaign by then candidate Shehu Francis pastor of the National Party of Nigeria (NPN).

In 1987, after warning about the state of the existing River Niger Bridge by the then Minister for Works and Housing Abubakar Umar, General Ibrahim Babangida challenged the local engineers to design The Second Niger Bridge, rising to the challenge, The Nigerian Society of Engineers called NSE Prems Limited, which subsequently delivered a masterplan. The addition of east–west railway line to the project, unfortunately the turmoil that precipitated the end of Babangida's administration stalled the plan.

Under the subsequent military governments, the projects received little attention. Upon the return to civilian rule, President Olusegun Obasanjo promised to deliver a second Niger River bridge. However his administration did not carry out any major activity on the project until five days before he handed over to the then incoming administration of Umaru Musa Yar'Adua, when Obasanjo flagged off the project in Asaba.

The incoming administration effectively inherited a ₦58.6 billion proposed cost for a six lane, 1.8 km tolled bridge, which was to be completed in three-and-half years. The bridge was to be financed under a public private partnership (PPP) with 60 per cent of the funding coming from the contractor, Gitto Group; 20 per cent from the Federal Government of Nigeria, and 10 per cent from the Anambra and Delta State Governments. Unfortunately the subsequent death of President Yar'adua marred the progress of the project.

However, in August 2012, the Federal Executive Council under Jonathan's administration, approved a contract worth ₦325 million for the final planning and design of the bridge. During the 2011 Nigerian general election campaign period, Jonathan has promised that if elected, he would deliver the project before the end of his term in 2015. At an Onitsha town hall meeting on August 30, 2012, he promised to go into exile if he did not deliver on the project by 2015.

The rigmarole continued under the President Muhammadu Buhari administration, who first cancelled the earlier contract in August 2015.

On December 15, 2022, at 9:50 local time, the bridge was opened to local traffic. Since not all connecting roads have been completed yet, makeshift roads have been created to allow the bridge to be used during the Christmas holidays. Crossing the bridge is free of charge for the time being.
