= River Niger Bridge =

Niger Bridge
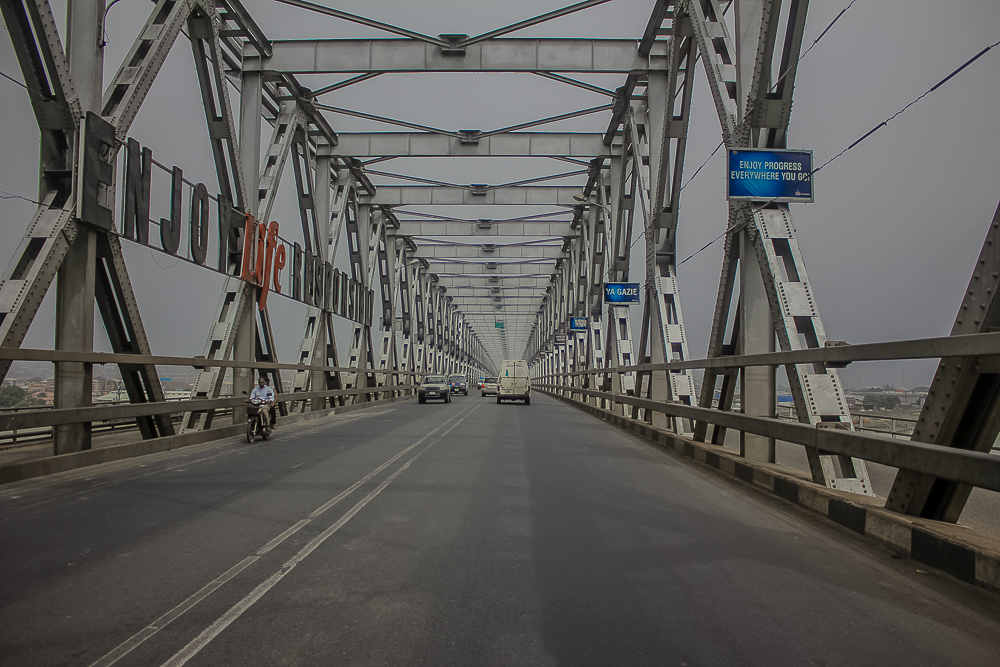
- The Onitsha bridge into Onitsha
- Coordinates: 6°08′04″N 6°45′32″E
- Carries: 3 vehicular lane central carriageway
- Crosses: Niger River
- Locale: Asaba
- Other name: Onitsha bridge
- Maintained by: Federal Ministry of Works

Characteristics
- Material: Steel
- Total length: 1,404 metres (4,606 ft)
- Longest span: 180 metres (600 ft)
- Piers in water: 7
- Clearance below: 23 metres (74 ft)

History
- Opened: December 1965

Location
- Interactive map of Niger Bridge

The River Niger Bridge or Onitsha Bridge is a bridge that connects the southeastern and southwestern regions of Nigeria across the Niger River. The bridge, which was completed in 1965, is located in Onitsha, Anambra State, and links to Asaba, Delta State. The bridge has two lanes and a pedestrian walkway, and is often congested with traffic and informal traders. A second bridge, known as the Second Niger Bridge or the Second Onitsha Bridge, was inaugurated in 2023 to ease the pressure on the existing bridge and provide a more modern and durable structure.

== History ==
Feasibility studies and design considerations on the possibility of constructing a bridge across the River Niger from Asaba to Onitsha were carried out by the Netherlands Engineering Consultants of The Hague, Holland (NEDECO) in the 1950s, Between 1964 and 1965, French construction giant, Dumez, constructed the Niger Bridge, to link Onitsha and Asaba in present-day Anambra and Delta States respectively at an estimated cost of £6.75 million. Construction of the bridge was completed in December 1965.

After its completion, the bridge was eight by four hundred and twenty feet (8×420 ft.) with a carriageway of 11 metres (36 ft) centre-truss and a pedestrian walkway on both sides of the carriageway. It was commissioned by the then Prime Minister the late Alhaji Tafawa Balewa and opened for traffic in December 1965. The commissioning of the bridge was the last public function of the Prime Minister before his assassination on January 15, 1966.

During the Nigerian Civil War of 1967 - 1970, in an attempt to halt the Nigerian military advance, retreating Biafran soldiers destroyed the River Niger Bridge at Onitsha, trapping the Nigerians on the other side of the river. During President Goodluck Ebele Jonathan administration, the bridge was rehabilitated by replacing two spans on the Onitsha end of the bridge that was damaged during the civil war with a fourteen-foot wide bailey, at an estimated cost of 1.5 million pounds.

=== 2026 emergency rehabilitation ===
In September 2026, the Federal Government announced emergency rehabilitation works on the bridge following the deterioration of its road surface and the vandalisation of some bridge components. The affected components included parts of the expansion joints, stanchions, and steel-truss nuts and bolts.

The Federal Ministry of Works announced that the bridge would be closed to traffic from 7 to 21 September 2026 to allow the work to be carried out. Sinohydro-Korean Engineering and Construction Company (SKECC) was contracted to carry out the rehabilitation works.

The work includes removing the damaged asphalt and laying a new asphalt wearing course. It also includes repairs to bridge components, installation of solar-powered streetlights, and installation of closed-circuit television cameras.

During the closure, motorists were advised to use the Second Niger Bridge as an alternative route. Traffic signs, barriers and traffic-control personnel were to be deployed to manage the diversion.
