= Asaba massacre =

Nigerian Civil War crime

- Asaba massacre (Nigeria)
- Location: Asaba, Nigeria
- Date: 5–7 October 1967
- Target: Igbo civilians of Asaba
- Attack type: Mass murder
- Deaths: Unknown; estimates range from 500–800
- Perpetrators: Nigerian 2nd Division under Murtala Mohammed, Ibrahim Haruna, Ibrahim Taiwo

The Asaba massacre occurred on 5–7 October 1967 in Asaba, Delta State, Nigeria during the Nigerian Civil War. The massacre targeted the people of Asaba, mostly composed of Igbo people, and was perpetrated by the Nigerian Army - specifically the Second Infantry Division under the command of Murtala Muhammed. An estimated 500–800 people were killed.

== Background ==
In August 1967, three months into the Biafran War, Biafran troops invaded the Mid-Western Region, to the west of the River Niger. They spread west, taking Benin City and reaching as far as Ore, where they were pushed back by the Nigerian Second Division, under the command of Col. Murtala Muhammed.

The Federal troops gained the upper hand, and forced the Biafrans back to the Niger, where they crossed the bridge back into the Biafran city of Onitsha, which lies directly across from Asaba. The Biafrans blew up the eastern spans of the Onitsha bridge, so that the Federal troops were unable to pursue them.

== Massacre ==
The Federal troops entered Asaba around October 5, and began ransacking houses and killing civilians, claiming they were Biafran sympathisers. Reports suggest that several hundred innocent males may have been killed individually and in groups at various locations in the town. Leaders summoned the townspeople to assemble on the morning of October 7, hoping to end the violence through a show of support for "One Nigeria." Hundreds of men, women, and children, many wearing the ceremonial akwa ocha (white) attire paraded along the main street, singing, dancing, and chanting "One Nigeria." At a junction, men and teenage boys were separated from women and young children, and gathered in an open square at Ogbe-Osowa village. Federal troops revealed machine guns, and orders were given, reportedly by Second-in-Command, Maj. Ibrahim Taiwo, to open fire. Most of the killing ended by 7 October.

The bodies of some victims were retrieved by family members and buried at home. But most were buried in mass graves, without appropriate ceremony. Many extended families lost dozens of men and boys. Federal troops occupied Asaba for many months, during which time most of the town was destroyed, many women and girls were raped or forcibly "married," and large numbers of citizens fled, often not returning until the war ended in 1970.

== Death toll ==
No exact death toll for the massacre has ever been calculated. In 1981, the Asaba Development Council assembled a list of 373 dead, but stated that it was incomplete. Anthropologist S. Elizabeth Bird and historian Fraser Ottanelli estimated that between 500 and 800 people were killed. David Scanlon of Quaker Relief Services reported that 759 men and boys were killed, while journalist Colin Legum wrote that 700 died. Eyewitness accounts estimated between 500 and over 1,000 deaths.

Among the victims was Nigerian Olympic athlete Sydney Asiodu, brother of the then Nigerian secretary Phillip Asiodu.

== Aftermath and analysis ==
Looting and destruction of property were widespread, and acts of violence continued in Asaba after October 7th as federal soldiers remained stationed in the city for months more.

I.B.M. Haruna has sometimes been incorrectly named as the officer who ordered the massacre, following a report of his testimony to the Nigerian Human Rights Violations Investigations Commission, known as the Oputa Panel. This article quoted him as claiming responsibility (as the commanding officer) and having no apology for the atrocity. However, Haruna was not present in Asaba in 1967. He replaced Murtala Muhammed as C.O. of the Second Division in spring 1968.

In October 2017, the Asaba community marked the 50th anniversary of the massacres with a two-day commemoration, during which the new, comprehensive book on the massacre, its causes, consequences, and legacy, was launched: "The Asaba Massacre: Trauma, Memory, and the Nigerian Civil War," by S. Elizabeth Bird and Fraser Ottanelli (Cambridge University Press). This book, which draws on interviews with survivors and military and government figures, as well as archival sources, discusses how and why the massacres happened, and the impact of this community trauma, decades after the event.

== See also ==
- Benjamin Adekunle
- 1966 anti-Igbo pogrom

== Bibliography ==
- Bird, S. Elizabeth; Ottanelli, Fraser (2018). "The Asaba Massacre and the Nigerian Civil War". Postcolonial conflict and the question of genocide : the Nigeria-Biafra War, 1967-1970. Florence: Taylor and Francis. ISBN 978-0-415-34758-7.
- Bird, SE and F. Ottanelli (2017). The Asaba Massacre: Trauma, Memory, and the Nigerian Civil War. Cambridge University Press.
- Bird SE and F. Ottanelli (2011). The History and Legacy of the Asaba, Nigeria, Massacres. African Studies Review 54 (3): 1-26.
