= A232 highway (Nigeria) =

Road in Nigeria

Coordinates: 6.263577°N 7.179844°E

Trunk Road A232

Location
- Country: Nigeria

Highway system
- Transport in Nigeria

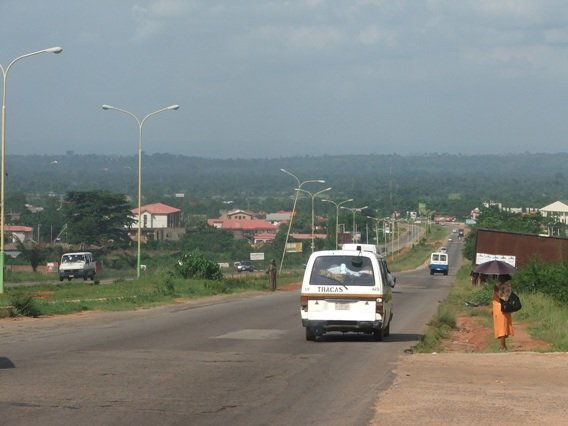
The A232 highway in Anambra State

The A232 highway is a highway in Nigeria. It is one of the east-west roads linking between two of the main south-north highways.

It is named from the two highways it links, the A2 highway and A3 highway.

== Route ==
The A232 highway runs from the A2 at Benin City to the A3 at the outskirts of Enugu, the capital of Enugu State.

The main cities and towns on the route are Agbor, Asaba, Onitsha and Awka.
