= I.B.M. Haruna =

Nigerian General

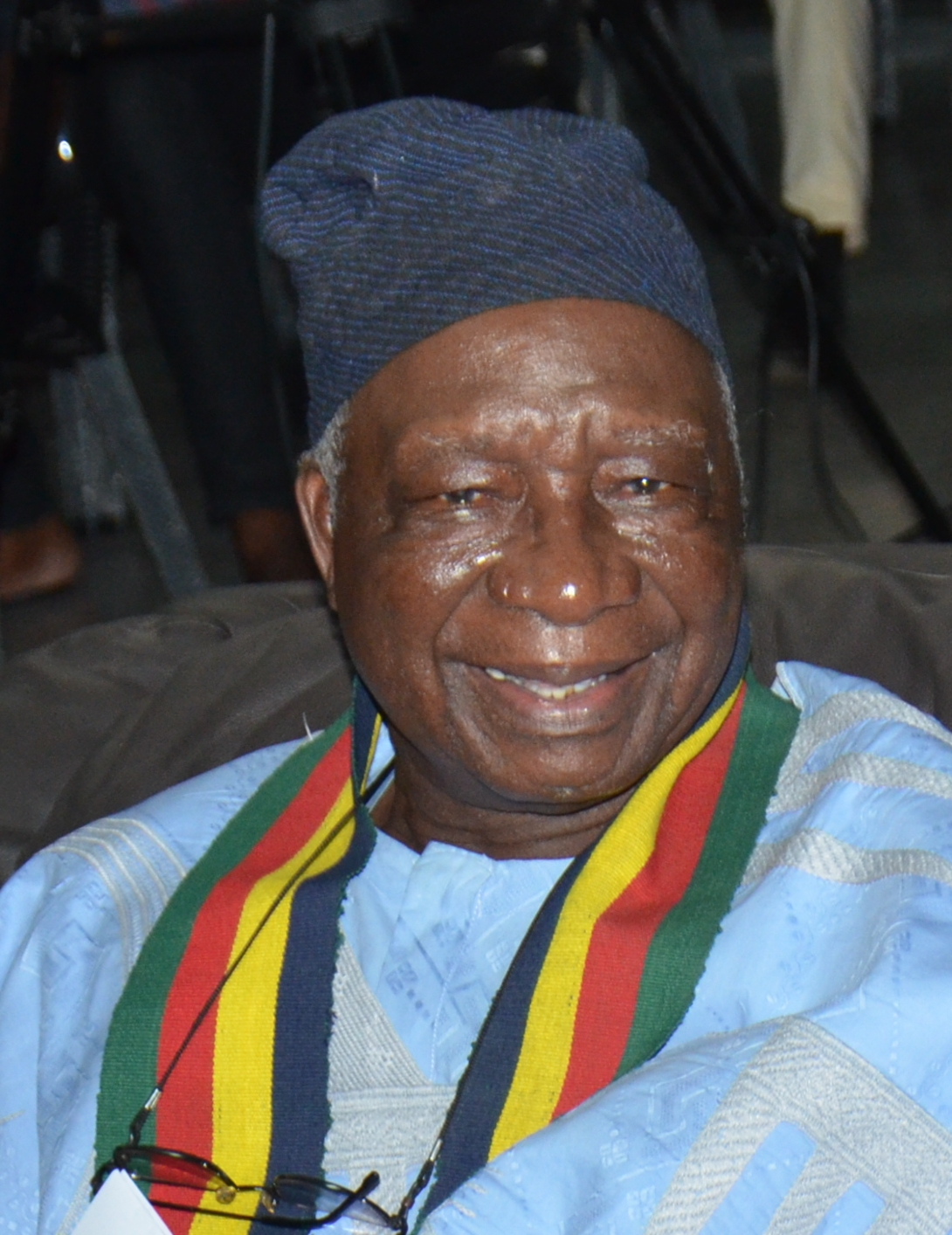
Maj. Gen. IBM Haruna (rtd)

Ibrahim Bata Malgwi Haruna (born 24 July 1940) is a retired officer of the Nigerian Army. He was a Federal Commissioner for Information and Culture between 1975 and 1977. He was also the Chairman, Executive Council, of Arewa Consultative Forum from 2009 to 2012. He holds the traditional title of Walin Garkida.

== Early life ==
Ibrahim Bata Malgwi Haruna was born on 24 July 1940 in Maiduguri, Borno State.

He was among the first 30 recruits enrolled into the Boys Company (later known as the Nigerian Military School) in 1954. They were known as the “First Platoon”. In 1958, IBM Haruna went to Regular Officers' Special Training School, Teshi, Ghana and later to Mons Officers' Cadet School, Aldershot, England (1959). He was commissioned into the Nigerian Army in 1961 upon his graduation as a member of RMA 27 of the Royal Military Academy Sandhurst, United Kingdom.

== Military career ==
As an army officer, IBM Haruna attended various courses. These include Joint-Services Staff College (JSSC) Latimer, United Kingdom (1972-1973). Prior to this he had qualified as an Ordnance Officer at the Royal Army Ordnance Corps, Blackdown, United Kingdom in 1963.

He was appointed the Principal Provision Control and Accounts Officer, Army Base Ordnance Depot, Yaba, Lagos (1964); Commanding Officer, Base Ordnance Depot, Yaba-Lagos (1965); Chief Ordnance Officer Nigerian Army and Ordnance Corps Commander (1966-1967); Leader, Army Delegation to U.S.A. Orientation Visit (1966). At the onset of the Nigerian Civil War he was appointed Rear Commander, 1 Division Nigerian Army, Kaduna (1967). He was once Commandant, Lagos Garrison Organisation and 3 Marine Commandant.

He was also the Quarter Master General, Nigerian Army (1968); General Officer Commanding (GOC), 2 Division (Main), Nigerian Army, Onitsha (1968-1969); Principal Staff Officer (PSO), Supreme Headquarters, Dodan Barracks Lagos (1969); Quartermaster General, Nigerian Army Headquarters (AHQ) (1970); Member of the General Adebayo Committee for the Re-Absorption of Biafran former Nigerian Army Officers (1970); Chairman Ceremonial Committee, 2nd All African Games (1970); and the Federal Commissioner for Information and Culture (1975-1977).

On 14 December 1973 he was appointed General Officer Commanding of the First Infantry Division.

As the Federal Commissioner for Information and Culture, he established the National Television Authority (NTA) in 1975 and the News Agency of Nigeria (NAN), he also advocated for the Press Council of Nigeria. He attended UNESCO Conference on Culture Accra-Ghana (1975) and Non-Aligned Nations Conference, New Delhi, India (1976).

He left the Nigerian Army as a Major General in 1977.

He was also the Chairman at Nigeria’s Participation in Africa’s Festival of Arts and Culture (FESTAC 1977); Chairman of Nigerian Institute of International Affairs (NIIA), Lagos (1978-1985); Chairman, National Institute for Policy and Strategic Studies (NIPSS), Kuru, Jos (1985-1992) Board of Governors; Member, Constitutional Conference (1988–89); Short term Chairman of Nigerian Railway Reform Committee (1992); a Member of the 19-Member Committee for the National Constitutional Conference Commission, under the Chairmanship of Justice Kawu, (1994); Advocate of Arewa consultative Forum (ACF) at the Oputa Panel (2005); Chairman, Executive Council, Arewa Consultative Forum (ACF) (2009-2012).

He is a Solicitor and Advocate of the Supreme Court of Nigeria. He is also a Notary Public of the Federal Republic of Nigeria as well as a Fellow of the Nigerian Institute of Management.

IBM Haruna is an avid golfer and he is the Life President of the Nigerian Professional Golfers Association (NPGA), the Chairman, Board of Trustees of the IBB Golf and Country Club Abuja; a member of the Board of Trustees, Ladies Golfers Association of Nigeria (LGAN), and a member of the Advisory Board of the West African Golf Tour, Abuja. He was also given the National Honour as an Officer of the Federal Republic (OFR) in 1980 by the then President Shehu Shagari GCON. In 2014, he was given the Integrity Magazine Merit Award, Accra, Ghana He is a public analyst and commentator. He is married with children and grand-children.

In September 2017, he was made the Life Patron of the Nigerian Military School (NMS) Zaria Ex-Boys Association (FCT Chapter). Four other eminent alumni - Lt. Gen. Isaac Chikadibia Obiakor (rtd), Col. John Okoli (rtd), Col. Musa Shehu (rtd) and Gp. Capt. Yakubu Suleiman - were decorated as Patrons of the Chapter for the year 2017/2018.
