= Enugu–Port Harcourt Expressway =

Expressway in Nigeria

Enugu-Port Harcourt Expressway
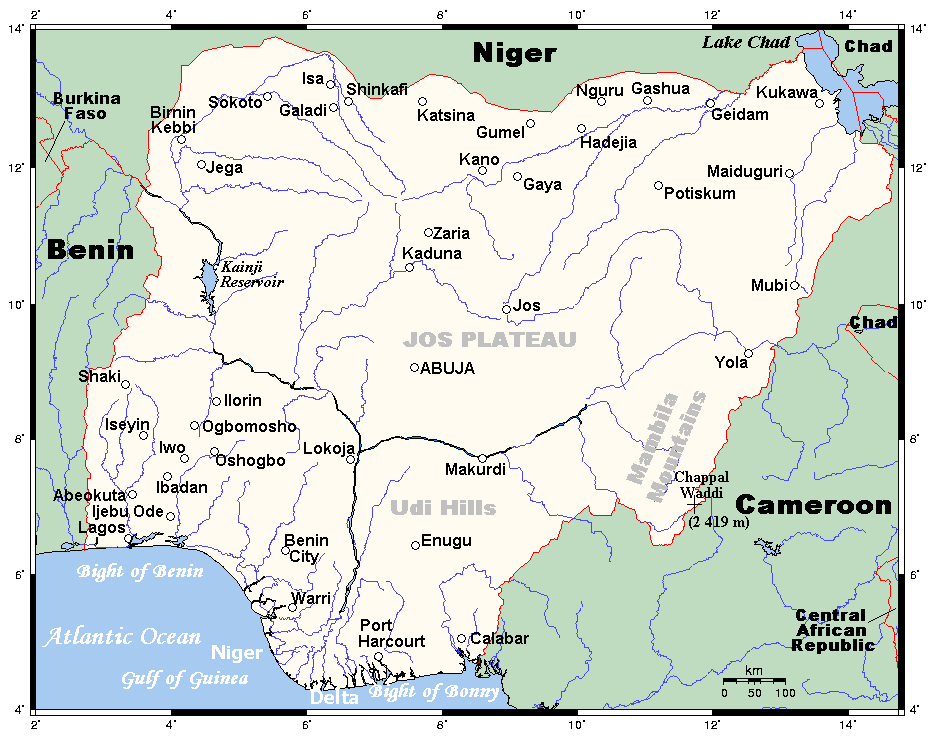

Route information
- History: Completed in 1970s

Major junctions
- South end: Enugu
- West end: Port-Harcourt

Location
- Country: Nigeria
- States: Enugu City, Port-Harcourt
- Major cities: Enugu City, Port-Harcourt

Highway system
- Transport in Nigeria

The Enugu-Port Harcourt Expressway was constructed in the late seventies during the Nigerian military regime. The route connect the country's five states in the country's South-East Geopolitical Zone. The highway runs for 230 kilometers not 41.4 kilometres (25.7 mi)beginning Enugu in Enugu State not at the Aba Rail Crossing Bridge in Aba township in Abia state and ending at the Eleme Junction Flyover in Port Harcourt, Rivers state.

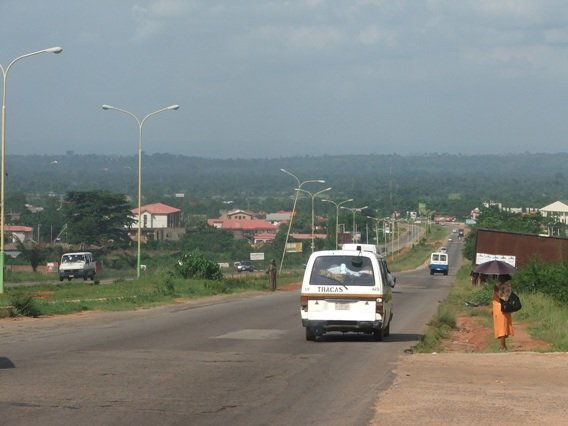
Enugu axis, Enugu-Port Harcourt Expressway

== Reconstruction ==
The project entails the construction of a 51.6-kilometre road connecting Umuahia and Aba, Abia State. It is a significant southeast road that connects at least five states in the Eastern area, including Enugu, Anambra, Abia, Imo, and Rivers.

The scope of work on the Enugu – Port Harcourt Dual Carriage Expressway includes pavement overlay of the existing dual carriageway with 7.3 m (24 ft) asphaltic concrete and 1.2 m (3 ft 11 in) inner surface dress shoulders, scarification of existing bituminous surface, improvement of the road alignment, provision of culverts and drains, asphaltic binder and wearing courses with kerbs and chutes.

The administration of President Goodluck Jonathan awarded the contract in September 2013 to Messrs Arab Contractors Nig. Ltd. for N50.89 Billion.

March 2017 was the initial expected project completion however, it was later revised to March 2020 due to funding constraints as only N450 million was released out the 1.6 billion appropriated in the 2019 budget. A total of N24.67 Billion has been committed to the project since inception to achieve 33 per cent of the level of completion.

In February 2021, the Minister of Works and Housing, Babatunde Raji Fashola, gave an update on the Lokpanta axis to the Enugu border is 98% completed, while the one on Port Harcourt boundary is almost 40% completed.

However, in September 2021, House of Representative ordered probe of failing Enugu-Port Harcourt road undergoing reconstruction urging the Minister of Works and Housing, Babatunde Fashola, to facilitate a quick rehabilitation of the failed portions of the Onitsha-Owerri highway.

== See also ==
- Federal Highway System of Nigeria
- Transport in Nigeria
