= Public Works Department (Nigeria) =

The Public Works Department of Nigeria also known as P.W.D. was the agency of the colonial government responsible for building and maintaining government buildings and property, roads, rail tracks, bridges, harbours and aerodromes. Its first director was appointed in 1896, in the preceding years, the department was under the guidance of the Surveyor-General.

Public works department in British colonial territories performed various functions, PWD carried out new constructions as stipulated in a budget as well as maintenance of government buildings, harbors, vehicles, sewage, water supply and equipment and furnishing connected to the projects. In addition, PWD provided technical advise to other departments in the colony.

One of the early projects of the department was laying rail tracks from Lagos to Ibadan, in addition, it executed construction of motorable dirt and gravel roads, the first of which began construction in 1905 as a feeder to the railway. Between 1925 and 1926, PWD began developing a trunk road system in the colony and in 1926, metalling and tarring of the Lagos - Abeokuta road was in progress.

== Branches ==
=== Roads and bridges ===
The initial road projects began in 1906 as developments out of the railway as it was extended from Lagos to other locations north of the colony. Paths were cleared for road developments linking Ibadan to Oyo, Osogbo to Ilesha and Ede to Iwo. After the great war, a road linking Lagos to Ibadan was built, and between 1922 and 1923, a route linking to Ibadan with Benin through Ife, Ilesha and Akure was completed.and in the East a route to Onitsha from Enugu through Owerri was constructed. In 1926, PWD was responsible for 2,900 miles of motorable services, but those roads were built with minimum standards and many were only motorable during dry seasons.

Other efforts of the department include the construction and management of a road bridge over River Challawa in Kano, the bridge was opened in 1928 having eight steel spans, a 150 feet span and remaining seven spans were 100 feet each. In addition, the 2,306 feet long Carter bridge, the first bridge linking Lagos Island with the mainland was opened in 1901 and managed by PWD.

In 1926, a Central Roads Board sanctioned a programme to develop a road trunk system and feeders roads that are fit for modern vehicles, subsequently, designs were drawn to create a route connecting Lagos with Kano, and improve on the route linking Oshogbo, Benin and Asaba via Ilesha was also approved. Improvement were made to enlarge the Lagos to Abeokuta route and a route was created linking Abeokuta to Ijebu-Ode. Other new or improvement projects included Lokojo to Okene, Port Harcourt to Aba, Abakaliki to Ogoja, Jebba to Share, Zungeru-Bida, and Keffi to Nasarawa. Included in the new program were plans to replace wooden bridges with steel and iron. Trunk A roads linking major town and cities were handled by PWD and were later called federal roads, while the feeder roads were handled by native authorities.

=== Waterworks ===
The department also managed major waterworks project and was directly involved in the provision of pipe borne water to communities in Lagos, Enugu, Kano, Kaduna and Jos. The first waterworks plant was built in Lagos; flow of water from Iju River was diverted into two settling tanks each capable of holding four million gallons before it was allowed to flow through sand filters and then pumped into an underground reservoir. In Enugu, the waterworks project used infiltration galleries to draw water from a spring before it is stored in a water reservoir.

Other facilities managed by the division included Ogunpa Waterworks, Port Hasrcourt, Aba and Okenne waterworks.

=== Electricity ===
The department was the pioneer provider of electricity in Nigeria, the first project was in Lagos and electricity was primarily used for street lighting. The power was generated from generators that were coupled with alternators. The division expanded with the installation of the Iddo power plant. In 1946, electrical division was separated from PWD to form the Nigerian Government Electricity Undertaking.

=== Buildings ===
PWD had a building division that constructed and maintained houses for European and African staff, hospitals, post offices, and barracks for the police and Royal West African Frontier Force. The houses of European and African employees were built according to standards set by PWD and were numbered from Type 1 to Type 10.

In 1931, the building branch began to develop a residential estate for African government staff in Yaba, Lagos, the construction of Yaba College of Technology, then known as Yaba Higher College began during this period.

=== Sawmill and workshops ===
The department managed a sawmill operation at Ijora, Lagos, obtaining softwoods, mahogany and hardwoods supplies from local sources and pitch pine from foreign sources. Product from the sawmill were used by the joinery furniture unit within the complex. The division also incorporated a training school for carpenters and built workshops in major cities of the country such as Enugu, Port Harcourt, and Kaduna. The workshops were equipped with woodworking machinery for manufacturing and maintenance.

=== Mechanical ===
The mechanical branch maintained departmental vehicles, moving equipment and mechanical equipment.

=== Stores ===
The stores branch under the leadership of a chief storekeeper was in charge of storage of valuable equipment and coordination of equipment use among other branches

=== Aerodromes ===
The branch was initiated in the mid 1930s when Imperial Air Mail Services desired regular services between Nigeria and United Kingdom.

== Selected projects ==
*Massey Hospital

*European Hospital at Enugu and Jos

*Yaba Estate Development Scheme

== Structure ==
PWD was headed by the director of Public Works, who was assisted by regional assistant directors manning three provinces. In the 1920s, three assistant directors where in charge of the Northern, Southern and Western areas and within each area were divisions and sub-divisions.

== Sports club ==
Through the establishment of various sports and recreational facilities for black and white employees across the country, PWD and other government agencies with the wherewithal to fund such facilities contributed to the growth of football in Nigeria. In 1929, a football team was founded in Lagos which later competed in a Lagos league and the football league of the Nigerian Football Association. NFA's first president, an architect was an employee of the department.
