= Sonny Odogwu =

High Chief Sonny Odogwu CFR
- Born: 20 March 1927 (age 99); Nigeria
- Occupation: Business tycoon
- Spouse: Theresa Odogwu
- Relatives: Violet Odogwu

Sonny Iwedike Odogwu (March 20, 1927 - Nov 5, 2018) was a Nigerian businessman who established SIO Group of Companies, a holding entity with investments in property development, shipping, finance, industrial relations and hotel management. Odogwu, a traditional aristocrat, held the title Ide Ahaba of Asaba.

Odogwu was the publisher of the defunct Post Express Newspapers that was published both in Port Harcourt and Lagos. The paper had as one of its objectives, the promotion of a pan-Igbo consciousness and its interests. the newspaper was one of the earliest to embrace web publishing.

== Early life ==
Odogwu hails from Asaba in Delta state, Nigeria. He was born in Cross River State. He completed his senior secondary education at Ilesha Grammar School, Ilesha in 1946 and after studies, he joined an insurance firm to work as a trainee.

== Career ==
In 1952, he branched out on his own to establish Robert Dyson and Diket, an insurance brokerage firm, in addition, he established trading store as a side business in Lagos Island. Between 1954 and 1958, Odogwu traveled abroad for further studies. Upon his return to Nigeria in 1958, he took up a position of assistant director with C.T. Bowring. He stayed with C.T. Bowring for a year then left to establish his own insurance brokerage outfit called African Insurance Underwriters. In 1965, he added life insurance business to his portfolio, establishing African Prudential Insurance. Odogwu grew his insurance business and started diversifying into other industrial sectors in 1972. By 1984, he had branched out into other industries under Sonny Iwedike Odogwu (SIO) group.

In 2012, Robert Dyson and Diket, Ltd, a firm largely owned by Odogwu signed a financing agreement with a group of creditors including Diamond Bank to finance the construction of Le Meridien Grand Towers Hotel in Lagos. In 2015, a Nigerian high court determined the firm did not fulfill the requirements of the financing and Robert Dyson and Diket was asked to refund Diamond Bank a total of 26.2 billion naira. Odogwu was the owner of the popular Grand hotel in Asaba.

== Death ==
Sonny Odogwu died on the 5th of November, 2018 at the age of 91.
