= Asaba =

Capital city of Delta State, Nigeria

Asaba Ahaba (Igbo)
- City
- Asaba
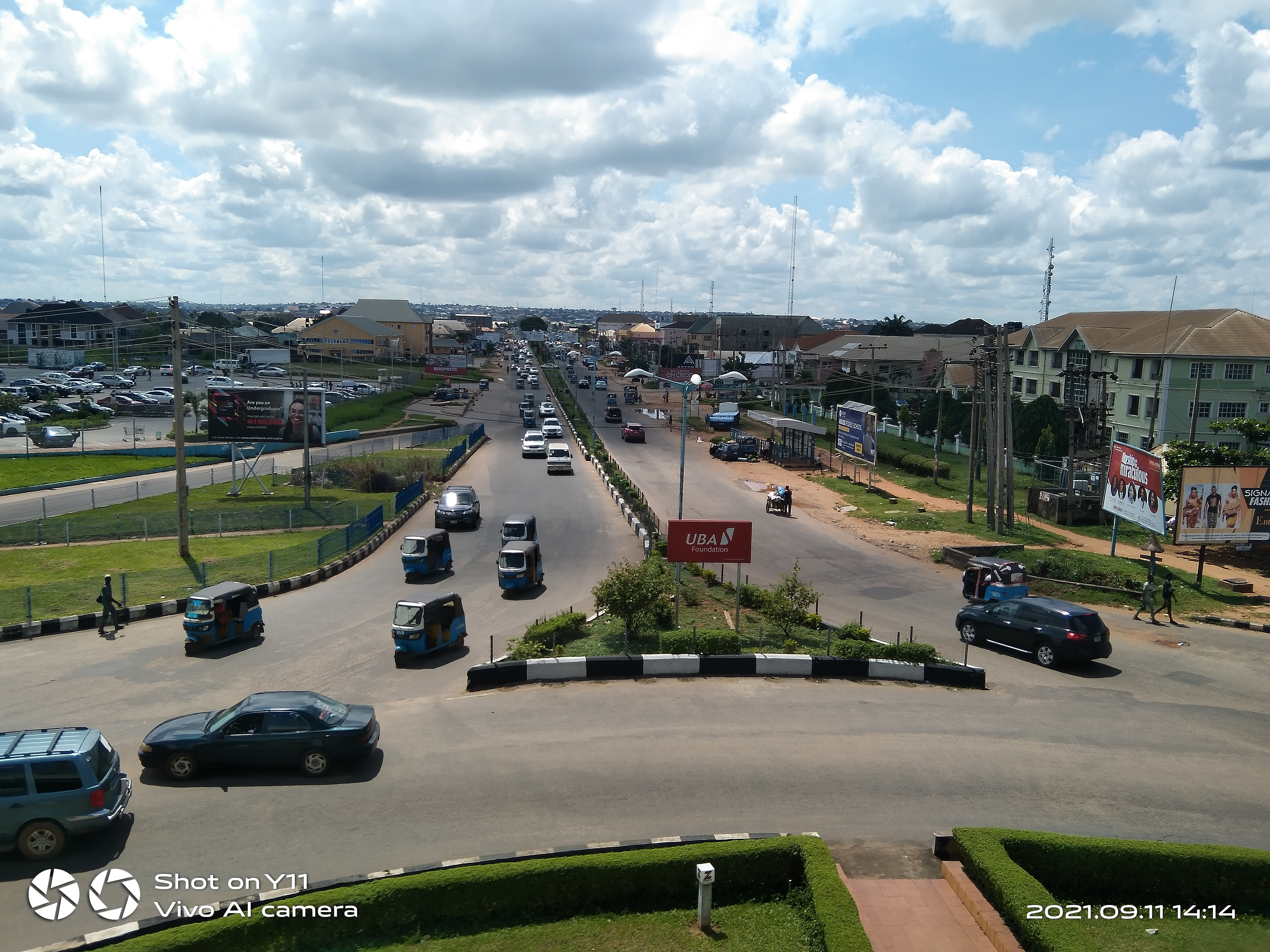
- Okpanam Road, a prominent avenue in Asaba
- Nicknames: Ani Mmili, Asb
- Location within Nigeria
- Coordinates: 6°11′N 6°44′E
- Country: Nigeria
- State: Delta State
- LGA: Oshimili South
- Founder: Nnebisi

Government
  - Asagba “Obi Eze” (Ceremonial): Prof. Epiphany Chigbogu Azinge

Area
  - City: 268 km^{2} (103 sq mi)
- Elevation: 55 m (180 ft)
- Highest elevation: 201 m (659 ft)
- Lowest elevation (Niger River): 40 m (130 ft)

Population (2006 census)
  - City: 149,603
  - Estimate (2011): 176,060
  - Density: 558/km^{2} (1,450/sq mi)
  - Urban: 500,000
- Demonym(s): Asaban, Ndi Ahaba, Ndi Asaba
- Time zone: UTC+1 (West Africa Time)
- Climate: Aw
- National language: Igbo
- Website: asaba.com

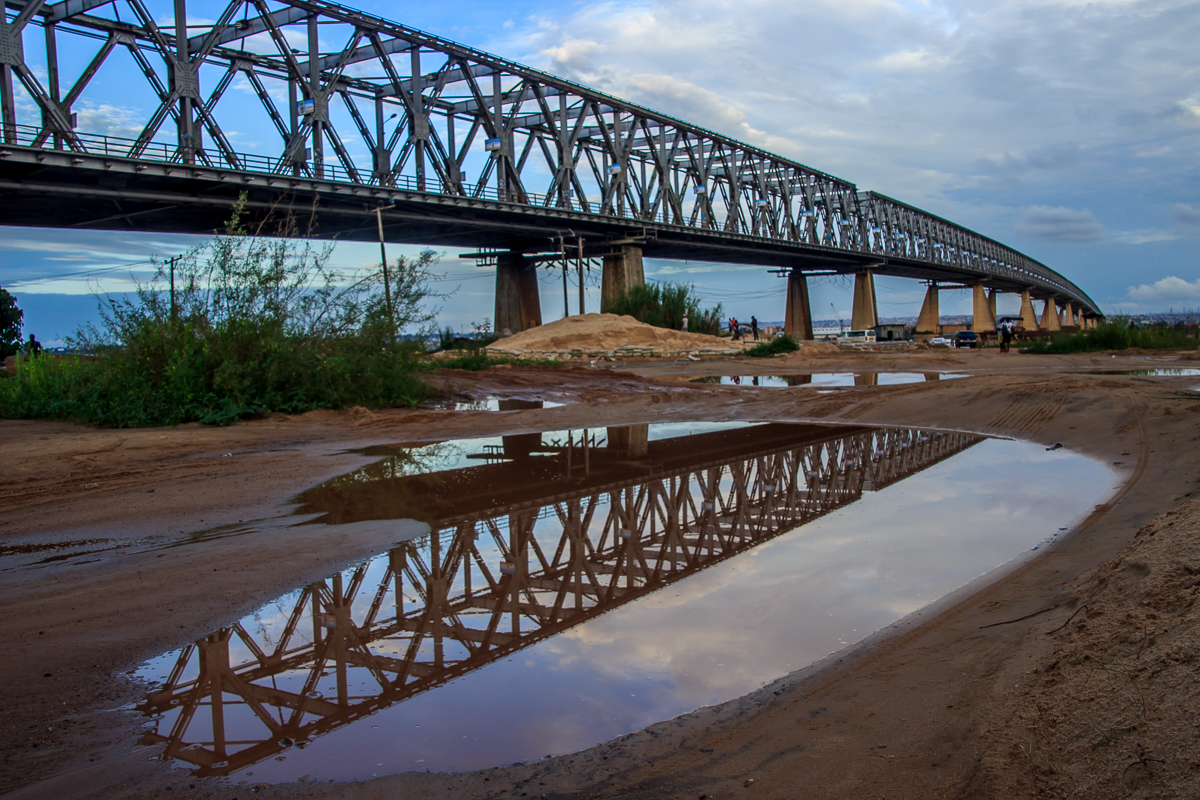
First Niger Bridge

Asaba (Igbo: Ahaba) is the capital of Delta State, Nigeria. A rapidly growing urban area, it is located on the western bank of the Niger River and serves as the seat of the Oshimili South Local Government Area and Delta State Capital Territory. Asaba had a population of 149,603 as at the 2006 census, and a fast growing metropolitan population today of over half a million people.

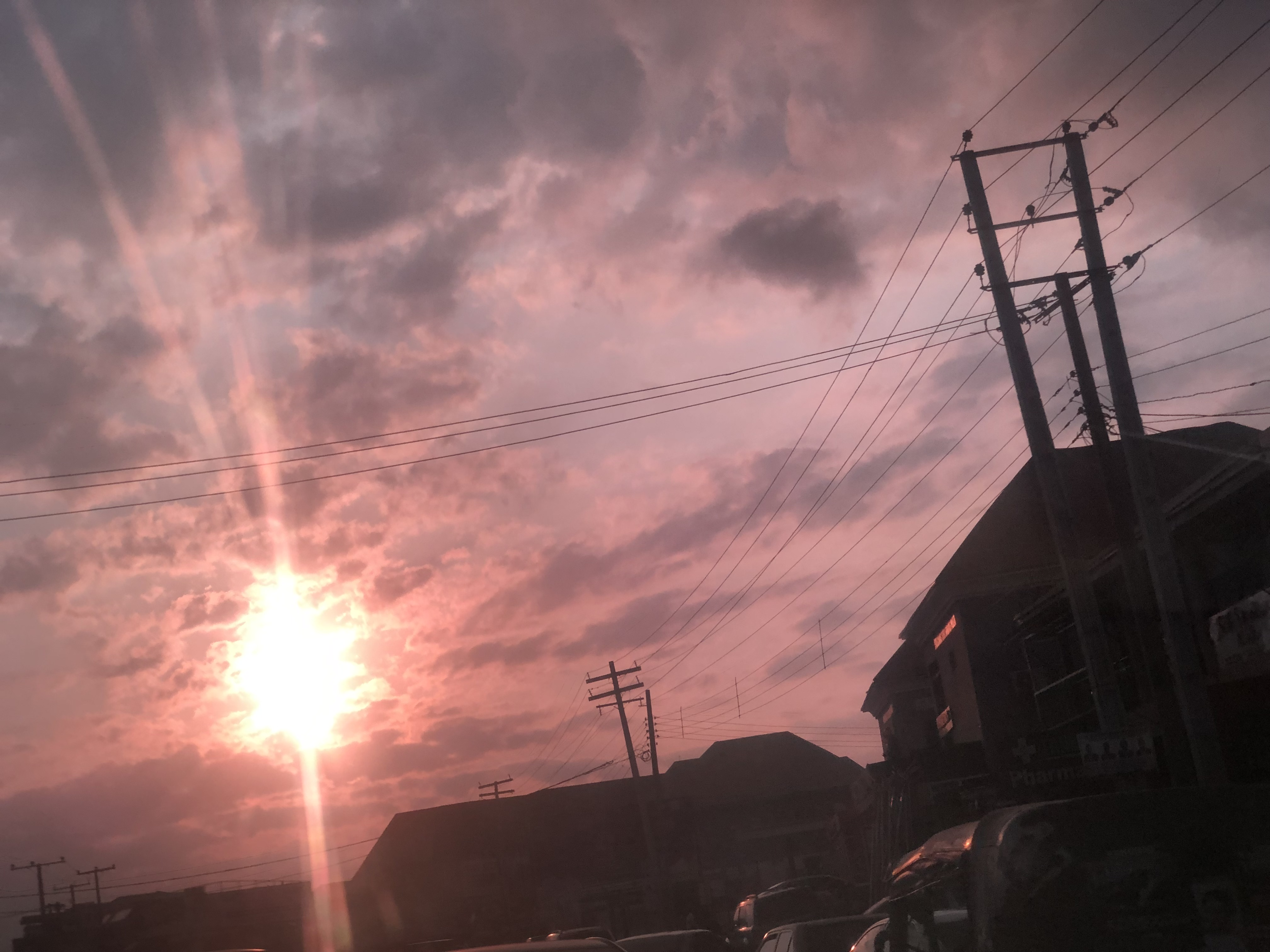
“Sunset in Asaba, Delta State (August 2024)”

In some respects, Asaba and neighboring Onitsha in Anambra State form a continuous metropolitan region. The First and Second Niger bridges traverse the boundary between Delta and Anambra with the Niger's relatively centralized location in this region marking it as the geopolitical border between Eastern and Western Nigeria.

In October 2023, Asaba joined the UNESCO Creative Cities Network and was named a UNESCO City of Film.

== History ==
Originally, Asaba consisted of nine quarters but due to internal strife, wars with other communities and slave trade that followed, these quarters were reduced to only 5. The existing quarters are:

1. Umuezei
2. Ugbomanta
3. Umuaji
4. Umuagu
5. Umuonaje

The city of Asaba was once the colonial capital of the Southern Nigeria Protectorate. It was founded in 1884. Between 1886 and 1900, it hosted the Royal Niger Company, which the British authorities set up to stimulate trade and the exportation of goods to England.

Owing to Asaba's influential history and geography, and current strategic political and economic influence in Nigeria, Asaba is generally known as the regional capital of the Anioma area and its peoples. The clamor for creation of Anioma state has been going on for decades. Today, the Asaba area is an ancestral homeland for ahaba people.

== Etymology ==
Asaba is from the exclamation Ahabam, meaning "I have chosen well", a quote from Nnebisi, the founding father of Asaba.

== Geography ==
Asaba is situated on a terrace of the lower Niger River in the historic midwest of the country; lying immediately northeast of the point of confluence with the Anambra River. Beyond the river banks, on the more extensive high plains and terraced hills, secondary forest vegetation flourishes. It is sited at the western bank of a key historic point on the river to the extent of cargo navigability, lying northwest to the city of Onitsha across. Although the current city lies just north of a marshy floodplain, expansive swaths of undulating, hilly terrain rises west and east of the main city with heights of up to 200 metres (660 feet) above sea level. The historic Niger River is a historic trans-African link beginning in Fouta Djallon range of Guinea and flows down into the Atlantic Ocean. Asaba forms a connector between western, eastern and northern Nigeria through the Niger River from the north and via the Asaba Niger Bridge, an east–west link and a Nigerian landmark. Adjoined cities of the Delta State Capital Territory, Ibusa and Okpanam, are located on an escarpment of the upland plateau to the west of the town.

Asaba lies approximately 6 degrees north of the equator and about the same distance east of the meridian; about 160 kilometres (100 mi) north of where the River Niger flows into the Atlantic Ocean. The greater Asaba metro occupies an area of about 300 square kilometres. while the area is noticeably drier than the southern areas, the city and the communities of Oshimili South in inclusion maintain an average tropical temperature of 32 °C during the dry season and an average fertile rainfall of 2,700 millimetres (106 in) during the rainy season.

Greater Asaba incorporates some of the other neighboring towns and communities such as Igbuzor, Okpanam, Anwai, Iyiba, Oko, Okwe and Ugbolu on the western section of the Niger River. Notable flora of the city the surrounding regions would be the Sapele tree.

=== Climate ===
Climate data for Asaba (1991-2020)
| Month | Jan | Feb | Mar | Apr | May | Jun | Jul | Aug | Sep | Oct | Nov | Dec | Year |
|---|---|---|---|---|---|---|---|---|---|---|---|---|---|
| Record high °C (°F) | 39.0 (102.2) | 40.0 (104.0) | 40.1 (104.2) | 39.0 (102.2) | 37.6 (99.7) | 36.2 (97.2) | 36.6 (97.9) | 34.0 (93.2) | 35.0 (95.0) | 36.0 (96.8) | 37.5 (99.5) | 37.6 (99.7) | 40.1 (104.2) |
| Mean daily maximum °C (°F) | 34.4 (93.9) | 35.8 (96.4) | 35.6 (96.1) | 34.2 (93.6) | 32.9 (91.2) | 31.5 (88.7) | 30.3 (86.5) | 29.8 (85.6) | 30.6 (87.1) | 31.8 (89.2) | 33.7 (92.7) | 34.3 (93.7) | 32.9 (91.2) |
| Daily mean °C (°F) | 28.2 (82.8) | 29.8 (85.6) | 30.1 (86.2) | 29.3 (84.7) | 28.4 (83.1) | 27.5 (81.5) | 26.8 (80.2) | 26.5 (79.7) | 26.9 (80.4) | 27.5 (81.5) | 28.7 (83.7) | 28.2 (82.8) | 28.2 (82.7) |
| Mean daily minimum °C (°F) | 22.0 (71.6) | 23.9 (75.0) | 24.6 (76.3) | 24.4 (75.9) | 23.9 (75.0) | 23.4 (74.1) | 23.3 (73.9) | 23.1 (73.6) | 23.1 (73.6) | 23.3 (73.9) | 23.7 (74.7) | 22.2 (72.0) | 23.4 (74.1) |
| Record low °C (°F) | 11.4 (52.5) | 12.5 (54.5) | 16.0 (60.8) | 19.5 (67.1) | 19.0 (66.2) | 19.0 (66.2) | 19.0 (66.2) | 18.7 (65.7) | 19.0 (66.2) | 18.0 (64.4) | 11.8 (53.2) | 14.0 (57.2) | 11.4 (52.5) |
| Average precipitation mm (inches) | 12.7 (0.50) | 19.8 (0.78) | 67.0 (2.64) | 149.2 (5.87) | 240.8 (9.48) | 301.0 (11.85) | 338.4 (13.32) | 301.0 (11.85) | 339.9 (13.38) | 234.8 (9.24) | 34.3 (1.35) | 2.8 (0.11) | 2,041.8 (80.39) |
| Average precipitation days (≥ 1.0 mm) | 0.7 | 1.2 | 3.6 | 7.4 | 11.4 | 14.3 | 16.2 | 17.3 | 16.6 | 12.6 | 2.2 | 0.3 | 103.8 |
| Average relative humidity (%) | 65.8 | 71.0 | 79.6 | 84.2 | 86.4 | 88.2 | 88.7 | 88.2 | 89.0 | 88.1 | 80.9 | 69.8 | 81.7 |
| Average dew point °C (°F) | 20.3 (68.5) | 22.5 (72.5) | 23.6 (74.5) | 24.1 (75.4) | 23.9 (75.0) | 23.4 (74.1) | 22.8 (73.0) | 22.8 (73.0) | 23.0 (73.4) | 23.5 (74.3) | 23.3 (73.9) | 21.1 (70.0) | 22.9 (73.1) |
| Mean daily daylight hours | 12.2 | 12.3 | 12.4 | 12.4 | 12.8 | 12.9 | 12.8 | 12.7 | 12.5 | 12.3 | 12.1 | 12.1 | 12.5 |
| Percentage possible sunshine | 47.4 | 47.7 | 43.5 | 45.8 | 44.5 | 36.8 | 27.2 | 25.8 | 29.4 | 41.4 | 54.5 | 54.4 | 41.5 |
Source 1: NOAA
Source 2: Weatherbase (dew point-day light-possible sun)

The mean annual temperature recorded in Asaba is 26.8 °C/ 80.2 °F. On average, 1331 mm/52.4 in of precipitation falls annually in Asaba. The Köppen climate classification for the city is Aw.

Climate change is causing a colder climate with a positive temperature trend, while horizontal trends indicate a decreasing trend.

Asaba experiences two distinct seasons: a warm, oppressive, and overcast wet season from March into late October and a hot, dry season from November into late February. The climate of the region is largely influenced by the prevailing movement and location of the southwesterly and northeasterly trade winds of the Intertropical Convergence Zone (ITCZ) respectively. Over the year, the temperature typically varies from 67 °F to 89 °F and is rarely below 60 °F or above 92 °F. Based on the beach/pool score, the best time of year to visit Asaba for hot-weather activities is from late November into late January.

=== Wind ===
The average hourly wind speed in Asaba experiences significant seasonal variation over the course of the year.

The windier part of the year lasts for 3.9 months, from May 31 to September 27, with average wind speeds of more than 9.3 kilometres per hour or 5.8 miles per hour. The windiest month of the year in Asaba is August, with an average hourly wind speed of 11.74 kilometres per hour or 7.3 miles per hour. The calmer time of year lasts for 8.1 months, from September 27 to May 31. The calmest month of the year in Asaba is November, with an average hourly wind speed of 6.9 kilometres per hour or 4.2 miles per hour.

=== Clouds ===
In Asaba, the average percentage of the sky covered by clouds experiences significant seasonal variation over the course of the year. The clearer part of the year in Asaba begins around mid November and lasts for 3 months on average, ending around mid February. The clearest month of the year in Asaba is December, during which on average the sky is clear, mostly clear, or partly cloudy 46% of the time. The cloudier part of the year begins around mid February as a result of the ITCZ system. and lasts for an average of 9 months, ending around mid November. The cloudiest month of the year in Asaba is May, during which on average the sky is overcast or mostly cloudy 85% of the time. Due to the Harmattan, the dry season is accompanied with a lot of dust which impedes visibility mid December–February.

=== Humidity ===
Asaba experiences extreme seasonal variation in the perceived humidity. The more humid period of the year lasts during the duration of the rainy season, from March to October. This a result of the ITCZ system pushing on humid south western trade winds. The month with the lowest humid days in Asaba is January.

== Demographics ==
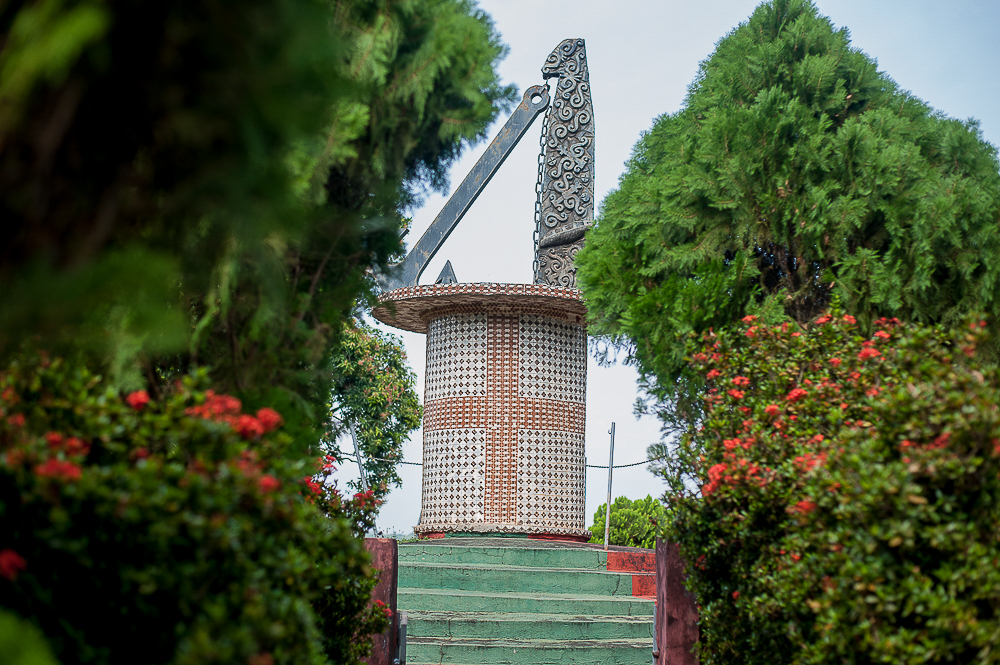
Anchor statue at Landers Brothers Anchorage, Asaba

The Anioma people are the native population of Asaba with majority speaking an Enuani dialect of the Igbo language. However, the city also houses a number of immigrant ethnicities from other ethnic groups native to and surrounding Delta State.

Since becoming the administrative capital of Delta State, Asaba has grown in population to an estimated half a million people. Today, it maintains a cosmopolitan population representative of the diverse cultures in Delta State and across Nigeria.

== Culture ==
Asaba culture is heavily influenced by the predominant Igbo culture. Asaba is culturally led by the revered Asagba of Asaba, to whom the leaders (individually referred to as the “Diokpa”) of each of the five Igbo quarters report directly on matters affecting the community. The Asagba is assisted by the Iyasele of Asaba (Iyase) who is the customary Prime Minister as well as a council of chiefs and elders (Olinzele, Otu Ihaza, Oloto etc.)

== Economy ==
Asaba is an administrative area and seat of government established during the time of the Royal Niger Company (now UACN), and is the administrative capital of Delta. Thus civil service leads the economy and economic activities of the city's inhabitants. The Nigerian government through the administration of Samuel Ogbemudia established the Asaba Textile Mills and a power substation at Asaba. The city of Asaba hosts some pharmaceutical companies that manufacture medicines and there is also a steel mill within the city. Tourism also attracts revenue into the city, which has resulted to a booming hospitality business. In 2023, the Film Village was opened officially in hopes of boosting the already growing Nollywood entertainment industry in the city. The city is linked by second Niger bridge to its sister city and largest trading partner Onitsha and the A232 to Benin city.

=== Markets ===
There are a few major markets in Asaba: Ogbe-Ogonogo Market, Cable Point Market, Infant Jesus Market, Iyanga Market, Midwifery Market and Wazobia Commodity Market

== Sport ==
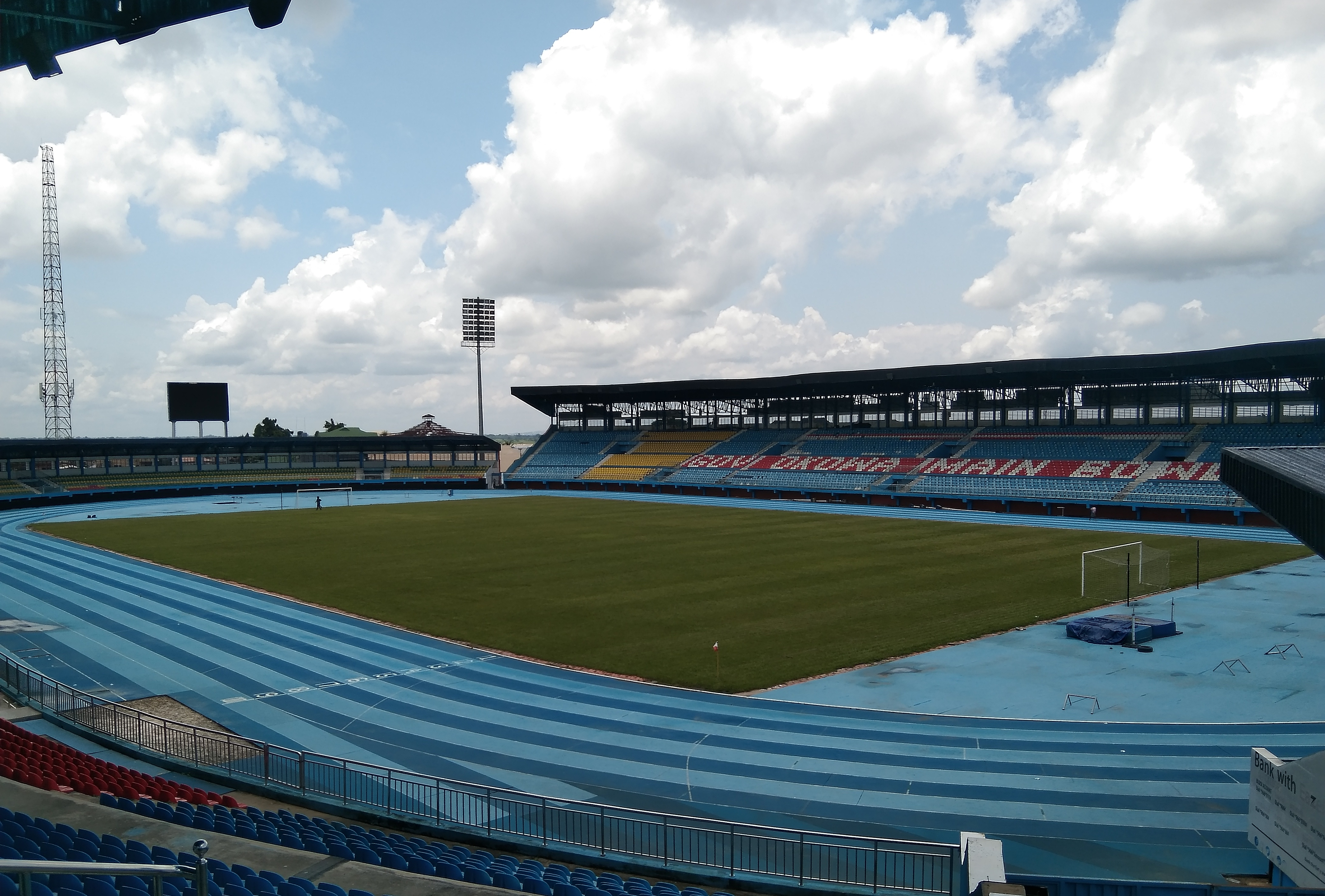
Stephen Keshi Stadium Asaba

The Stephen Keshi Stadium at Asaba, which has undergone recent renovations, has hosted several international competitions and soccer events since it was upgraded by the administration of Senator Dr. Ifeanyi Arthur Okowa and commissioned by Nigeria's former president Olusegun Obasanjo. The stadium is the home of Delta Force FC.

== Transport ==
=== Air ===
The city of Asaba and neighboring cities are accessible by air through the Asaba International Airport located just outside of the main city on the A232.

Asaba International Airport was commissioned in 2011 by Delta State Government.

=== Road ===
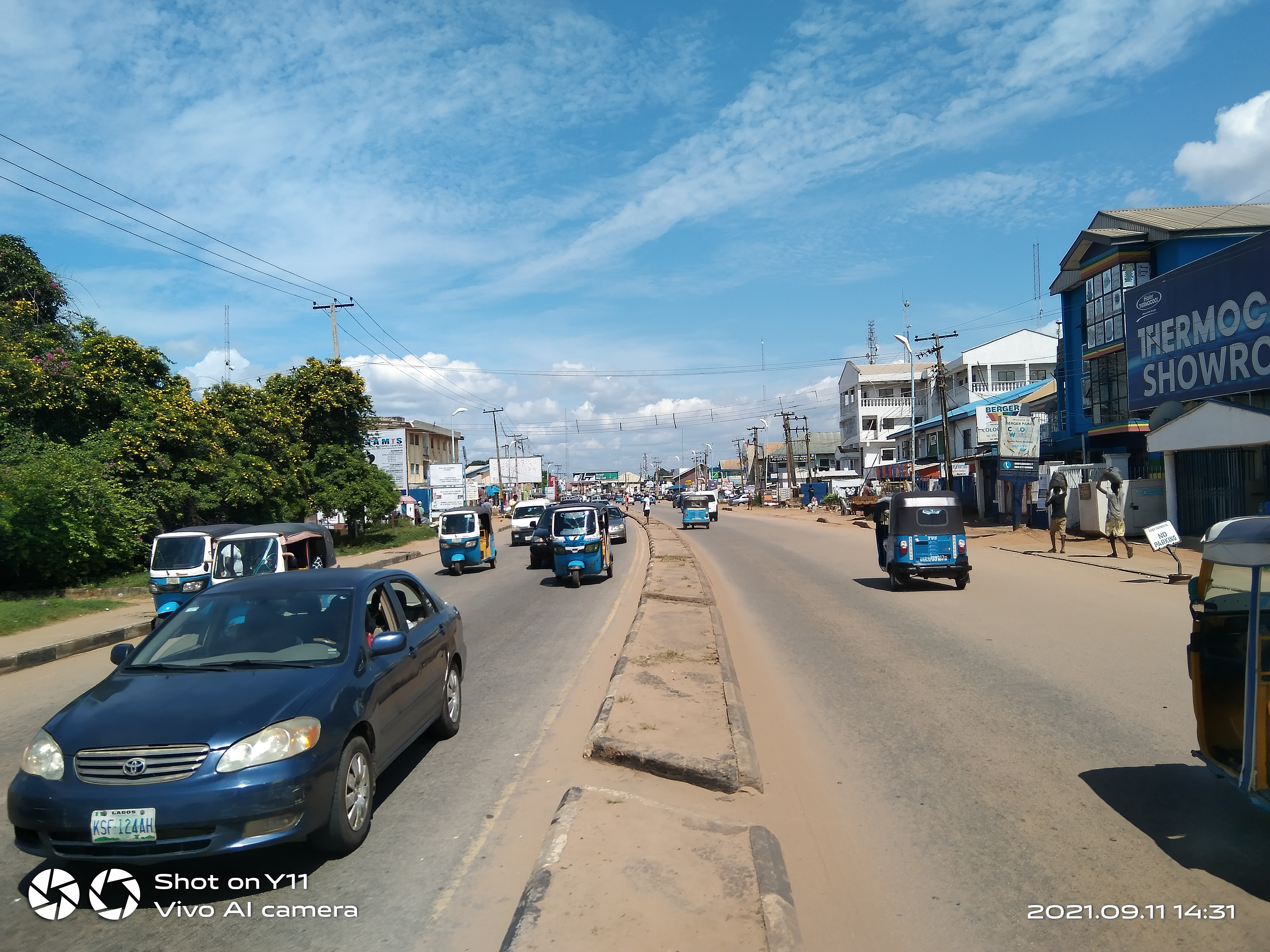
Nnebisi Road, Asaba

The A232, more known as the Asaba-Benin Expressway is an important roadway which connects parts of eastern Nigeria with western Nigeria. The Ogwashi-Uku-Ughelli highway which has undergone extensive expansion also connects areas of Asaba with Ndokwa country, Ughelli and the southern reaches of the state, with the Asaba-Ebu road historically connecting the city with northern Nigeria. Construction has been undertaken south of Oko to build an expressway linking the city of the completed Second Niger Bridge with a link expressway from the riverbank to an intersection on the A232 at Okpanam still undergoing construction. The bridge serves to reduce traffic congestion along the First Niger Bridge and the A232.

=== Water ===
Asaba is served by water transportation available through the Niger River, which surrounds the easternmost stretches of the city. Until the commissioning of the First Niger bridge, the main transportation means across the Niger were ferry services were provided across to Onitsha via Cable point. The city is also planned to be serviced by the neighboring Onitsha port located south of the city.

== Notable people ==
- Phillip Asiodu
- Epiphany Azinge
- Maryam Babangida
- Joseph Chike Edozien
- Lynxxx
- Frank Nwachukwu Ndili
- Uche Natori
- Ike Nwamu
- Emma Nyra
- Chief Dennis Osadebay
- SHiiKANE

== Gallery ==
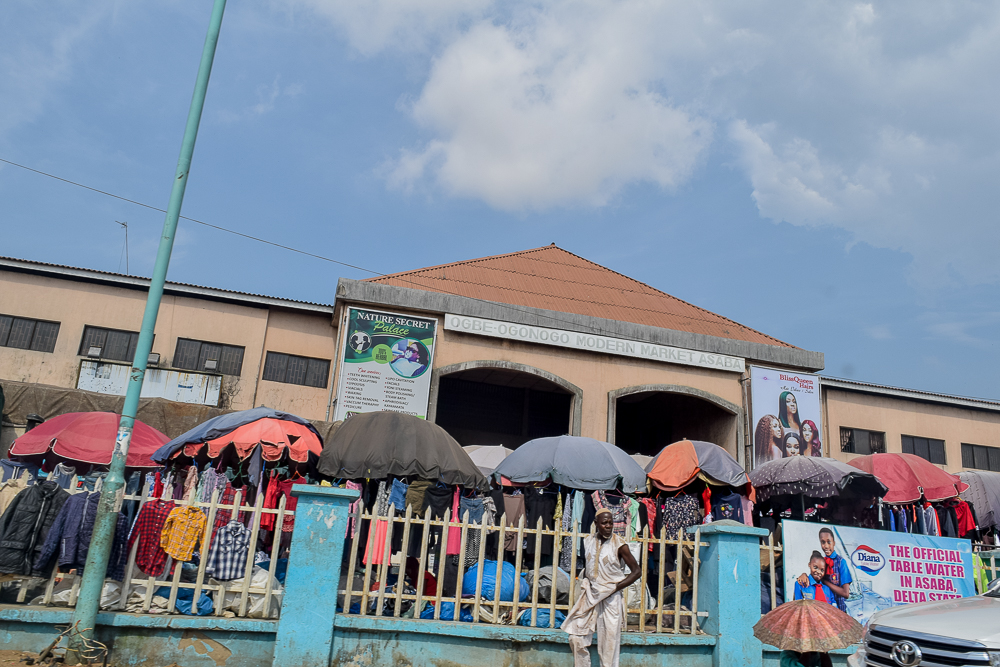
Ogbe-Ogonogo Market

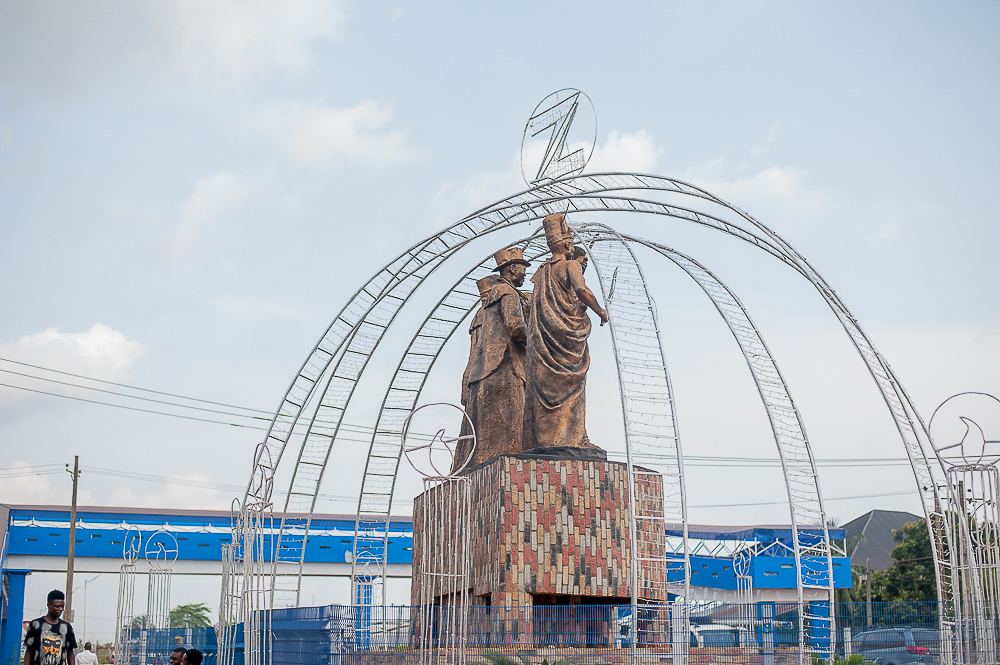
Roundabout in Asaba

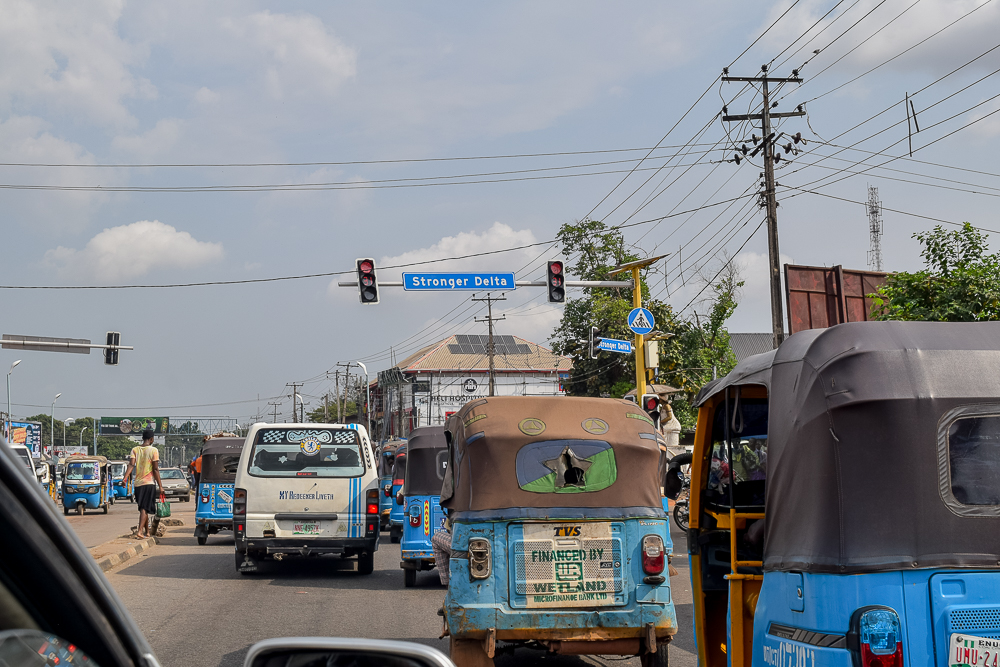
Junction in Asaba

== See also ==
- Abraka
- Asaba-Asa
- Asaba massacre
- Ekumeku Movement
