= Joseph Chike Edozien =

Nigerian traditional ruler (1924–2024)

Joseph Chike Edozien, CFR, JP (28 July 1924 – 7 February 2024), was a Nigerian traditional ruler and distinguished academic who served as the Asagba of Asaba — the King of Asaba, Delta State. He was a professor of medicine and the first Nigerian dean of the Faculty of Medicine at the University of Ibadan. His reign marked a period of significant cultural preservation and modernization of the Asaba kingdom. He ascended the throne in 1991 and reigned until his passing in 2024 at the age of 99. or King of Asaba, Delta State.

== Background and education ==
Joseph Chike Edozien was born on 28 July 1924. His father was Nathaniel Okafor Edozien a direct descendant of Nnebisi, the founder of Asaba, and one of the most senior indigenous officials of the Nigerian Coal Corporation in Enugu. His mother, Nwakuso Edozien née Odogwu, was the daughter of a prominent Asaba chief, and a notable trader.

Edozien's father sent him at an early age to live with an uncle who was a school master in Warri, Delta State then Bendel State, Nigeria. He attended the Catholic School in Warri from 1933 to 1937. He attended Christ the Kings College, Onitsha for his secondary education from 1938 to 1942. In 1942 he attended the Higher College Yaba and then proceeded to Achimota School, Accra, Ghana.

His university education began with an admission to the University College Dublin, Ireland in 1944. He completed his BSc with honours in Physiology from the National University of Ireland in 1948, MSc in Physiology in 1950, Bachelor of Medicine and Bachelor of Surgery (MBBCh) in 1954. He won several academic awards in the process.

== Career ==
Edozien's academic career began with an appointment as a lecturer in Clinical Biochemistry in Middlesex Hospital Medical School, University of London in 1951. In 1952 he was appointed a Senior Lecturer in Chemical Pathology at the University College, Ibadan. He returned to Ibadan after further studies in Ireland.

In 1955, he married Modupe Smith, a radiographer at the University of Ibadan teaching hospital. Her father was one of the first indigenous managers of the United Africa Company and her maternal grandfather was Herbert Macaulay, Nigeria's first surveyor and one of the principal actors in Nigeria's independence movement.

During the late colonial and early independence period, educated Nigerians increasingly assumed positions of responsibility in politics, commerce, and academia. During this time, Edozien conducted research in nutrition at the University of Ibadan. He was appointed professor in 1961 and became dean of the Faculty of Medicine in 1962.

== Later career ==
Edozien's career at Ibadan ended in 1967, a casualty of the political crisis that ended the euphoria of the late 1950s and early 1960s and resulted in the coups of 1966 and eventually led to the Nigerian Civil War. In 1967 he was instrumental in the efforts to establish the University of Benin in the newly created Midwestern Region of Nigeria. He was also implicated in the plots that resulted in the Biafran invasion of the Midwestern Region at the beginning of the civil war and was forced to flee the country.

Edozien is considered one of the most impactful, in the history of medicine in Nigeria. Not only was he a pioneer in laboratory science, pathology, research in the development of a malaria vaccine, the effects of vitamin c and protein intake on the body and in child development, but he also pioneered the development of Physiotherapy as a post graduate degree course in Nigeria and educated the first cohort of laboratory scientists in Nigeria thereby establishing the pillars of the degree course in Nigeria. He was instrumental in the recognition of the School of Medicine at what is now University of Ibadan as a foremost institution on par with other international schools of medicine. He was instrumental in gathering funding from the Rockefeller Foundation and others to further develop the UI campus. He served on a number of key medi Al institutions in the country including the NMA and NIMA.

After a period as a refugee in France, he was appointed a professor of Nutrition at the Massachusetts Institute of Technology, Cambridge, MA. In 1971 he became a professor and head/Chairman of Department of Nutrition, of the School of Public Health of the University of North Carolina. After an over 20 year stint as Chairman of the Department of Nutrition, he holds an endowed chair at this leading US institution of public health.

Edozien also left his mark on university education in Nigeria in general. He was instrumental in the creation of University of Benin as well as the further development of University of Nigeria, Nsuka. Due to his protests on lack of equal pay between indigenous and expatriate professors during the colonel era, the salary scales at universities in Nigeria were changed and equalised with no discrimination against African professors.

Edozien was also the chancellor of the Federal University of Agriculture, Abeokuta. At the time of his death he was the pro chancellor of the Federal University, Gashua, Yobe State.

== Nigeria ==
In 1990 Edozien was appointed the Chairman of the Nigerian Institute of Medical Research. Shortly thereafter he was selected to become the 13th Asagba of Asaba. In 2012, he was appointed the Eze Ndieze. He retired as a Professor Emeritus of the University of North Carolina and returned to Nigeria in 1991.

Edozien's tenure as the Asagba of Asaba coincided with dramatic changes in the character of the town which is now a significant capital city. When the government of President Ibrahim Babangida created Delta State out of the old Bendel State, Asaba was chosen as the capital. Its new status as the seat of the state government has brought much of the chaotic development associated with contemporary Nigerian urbanization. The population of the town has grown and the influx of non-Asaba indigenes has strained the traditional institutions of the town.

A central theme of Edozien's tenure as the Asagba was the challenge of balancing rapid development, modernization of traditional norms and institutions with preservation of the positive aspects and moderating influence of traditional values. Several on-going initiatives such as the Asaba permanent palace and civic centre and the documentation of the town's traditional laws and customs have sought to balance these concerns.

Edozien was an important figure in modern-day Nigerian affairs. He was Vice Chairman of the Traditional Rulers Council and was instrumental in ensuring that the Federal Government recognized the important place of our traditional governance systems in keeping peace and order in the country. Additionally, he wove the traditional kingdoms and their rulers into the local government area governance systems in an attempt ensure synergy in the management of local government affairs. He remained vocal throughout his life on the need for our governance systems to recognize the role traditions could and should play in ensuring the development of the country.

Edozien has been conferred with many awards and much recognition including the This Day Awards. President Olusegun Obasanjo conferred the national honor of Commander of the Federal Republic on him in 2003. He is considered one of the highly respected traditional rulers who encouraged and promoted mutual coexistence between the people in the south and Northern Nigeria.

Edozien died on 7 February 2024, at age 99. Despite initial reports surfacing on 7 February, the Palace, in keeping with Asaba traditions, did not confirm his death until 7 days after the sad event, on 13 February 2024.
