= Asaba-Asa =

- Town
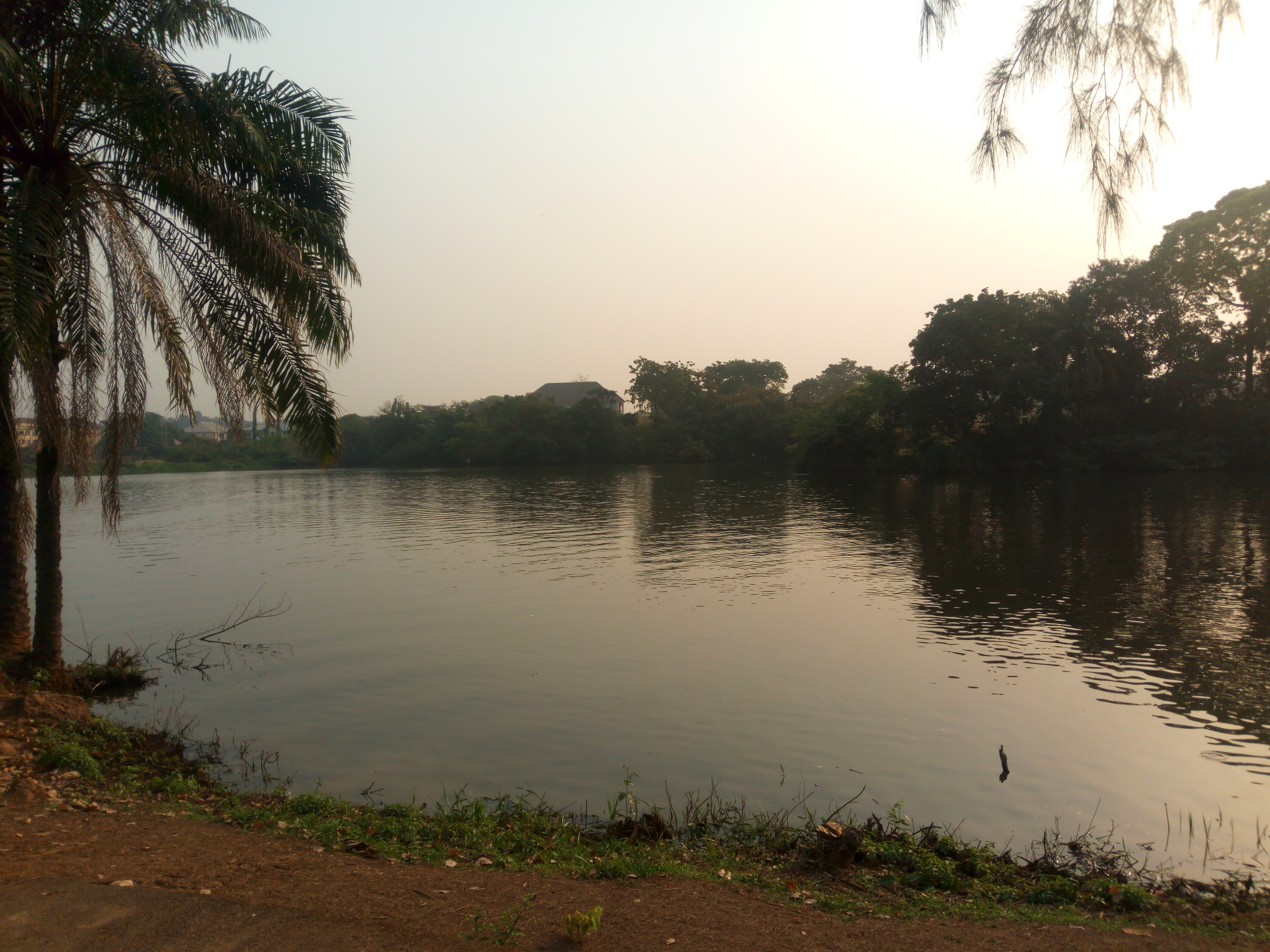
- Asa Lake

- Location in Nigeria
- Coordinates: 5°33′7″N 6°31′34″E
- Country: Nigeria
- State: Delta State

Area
  - Total: 268 km^{2} (103 sq mi)

Asaba-Asa is a town in Nigeria's Delta State.
