= Phillip Asiodu =

Nigerian diplomat (born 1934)

Federal Minister of Petroleum

Personal details
- Born: 26 February 1934 (age 92) Delta State, Nigeria
- Party: People's Democratic Party

Phillip Asiodu, (CON) (born 19 February 1934) is a Nigerian diplomat, bureaucrat, and former Minister of Petroleum.

== Life and career ==
Phillip was born February 26, 1934, in Lagos State, southwestern Nigeria. He attended King's College, Lagos before he proceeded to Queen's College, Oxford where he obtained a master's degree in Philosophy. He joined the Nigerian Civil service in 1964 and became the Federal Permanent Secretary, and first served under General Gowon before and during the Nigeria-Biafra war. He was instrumental in the U-turn on the Aburi Accord by Gowon. He later became Special Adviser to the President of the Federal Republic of Nigeria, Alhaji Shehu Shagari on economic affairs. In 1999, he was appointed Chief Economic Adviser to the former Nigerian President, Chief Olusegun Obasanjo. Among other leadership roles includes the planning and implementation of Nigeria’s oil and gas policies. He also took part in the negotiations for Nigeria’s admission into OPEC, 1971.

His younger brother, the athlete Sidney Asiodu, died in the Asaba massacre.

== Political life ==
In 1998, he became a member of the People's Democratic Party, and a Trustee of the party. In 1999, he contested nomination as the party’s Presidential candidate but unsuccessful.

== Awards ==
- Commander of the Order of the Niger

== See also ==
- Anioma people
