= Athletics at the 1966 British Empire and Commonwealth Games – Men's 4 × 440 yards relay =

Men's 4 × 440 yards relay at the 1966 British Empire and Commonwealth Games
- Venue: Independence Park, Kingston
- Dates: August 13, 1966

Medalists
gold medal	Lennox Yearwood, Kent Bernard, Edwin Roberts, Wendell Mottley	Trinidad and Tobago
silver medal	Ross MacKenzie, Brian MacLaren, Don Domansky, Bill Crothers	Canada
bronze medal	Martin Winbolt-Lewis, John Adey, Peter Warden, Tim Graham	England

The men's 4 × 440 yards relay event at the 1966 British Empire and Commonwealth Games was held on 13 August at the Independence Park in Kingston, Jamaica. It was the last time that the imperial distance was contested at the Games: in 1970 it was replaced by the 4 × 400 metres relay.

== Medalists ==
Gold	Silver	Bronze
Trinidad and Tobago; Lennox Yearwood; Kent Bernard; Edwin Roberts; Wendell Mottley	Canada; Ross MacKenzie; Brian MacLaren; Don Domansky; Bill Crothers	England; Martin Winbolt-Lewis; John Adey; Peter Warden; Tim Graham

== Results ==
=== Heats ===
Qualification: First 4 teams of each heat (Q) qualified directly for the final.

Heats results. See also qualifying criteria for final
Rank	Heat	Nation	Athletes	Time	Notes
1	1	Trinidad and Tobago	Lennox Yearwood, Kent Bernard, Edwin Roberts, Wendell Mottley	3:10.8	Q
2	1	Canada	Ross MacKenzie, Brian MacLaren, Don Domansky, Bill Crothers	3:11.7	Q
3	1	Nigeria	Benedict Majekodunmi, David Ejoke, Kingsley Agbabokha, Paulinus Nwaokoro	3:13.4	Q
4	1	England	Martin Winbolt-Lewis, John Adey, Peter Warden, Tim Graham	3:13.7	Q
5	1	Bermuda	Tony Harper, Colin Davey, Ewert Brown, Noel Simons	3:15.2	
1	2	Uganda	Amos Omolo, Asuman Bawala, Francis Hatega, George Odeke	3:13.4	Q
2	2	Jamaica	Clifton Forbes, George Kerr, Lawrence Khan, Rupert Hoilette	3:14.2	Q
3	2	Barbados	Bertram Catwell, Charles Harewood, Ezra Burnham, Keith Forde	3:17.3	Q
4	2	Australia	Gary Knoke, Kenneth Roche, Noel Clough, Gary Eddy	3:26.5	Q

=== Final ===
Final results
Rank	Nation	Athletes	Time	Notes
1st place, gold medalist(s)	Trinidad and Tobago	Lennox Yearwood, Kent Bernard, Edwin Roberts, Wendell Mottley	3:02.8	GR
2nd place, silver medalist(s)	Canada	Ross MacKenzie, Brian MacLaren, Don Domansky, Bill Crothers	3:04.9	
3rd place, bronze medalist(s)	England	Martin Winbolt-Lewis, John Adey, Peter Warden, Tim Graham	3:06.5	
4	Jamaica	Clifton Forbes, George Kerr, Lawrence Khan, Rupert Hoilette	3:06.8	
5	Australia	Gary Knoke, Kenneth Roche, Noel Clough, Peter Norman	3:12.2	
6	Nigeria	Benedict Majekodunmi, David Ejoke, Kingsley Agbabokha, Paulinus Nwaokoro	3:12.4	
7	Barbados	Bertram Catwell, Charles Harewood, Ezra Burnham, Keith Forde	3:12.9	
8	Uganda	Amos Omolo, Asuman Bawala, Francis Hatega, George Odeke	3:13.6	
