= Athletics at the 1966 British Empire and Commonwealth Games – Men's 440 yards =

Men's 440 yards at the 1966 British Empire and Commonwealth Games
- Venue: Independence Park, Kingston, Jamaica
- Dates: August 8 and 11, 1966

Medalists
| gold medal | Wendell Mottley | Trinidad and Tobago |
| silver medal | Kent Bernard | Trinidad and Tobago |
| bronze medal | Don Domansky | Canada |

The men's 440 yards event at the 1966 British Empire and Commonwealth Games was held on 8 and 11 August 1966 at the Independence Park in Kingston, Jamaica. It was the last time that the imperial distance was contested at the Games later replaced by the 400 metres.

The winning margin was 0.98 seconds which as of 2024 remains the only time the men's 440 yards or men's 400 metres was won by more than 0.8 seconds at these games.

== Medalists ==
Medallists
| Gold | Silver | Bronze |
|---|---|---|
| Wendell Mottley; Trinidad and Tobago | Kent Bernard; Trinidad and Tobago | Don Domansky; Canada |

== Results ==
=== Heats ===
Qualification: First 2 in each heat (Q) plus the next 2 fastest overall (q) qualify for the semifinals.

Heats results. See semifinal qualification criteria.
| Rank | Heat | Name | Nationality | Time | Notes |
|---|---|---|---|---|---|
| 1 | 1 | Ross McKenzie | Canada | 47.9 | Q |
| 2 | 1 | Francis Hatega | Uganda | 48.1 | Q |
| 3 | 1 | Mel Spence | Jamaica | 48.3 | |
| 4 | 1 | Paulinus Nwaokoro | Nigeria | 48.4 | |
| 5 | 1 | Ewert Brown | Bermuda | 48.7 | |
| 6 | 1 | Herbert Couacaud | Mauritius | 51.8 | |
| 1 | 2 | Noel Clough | Australia | 47.8 | Q |
| 2 | 2 | Edwin Skinner | Trinidad and Tobago | 48.2 | Q |
| 3 | 2 | Rupert Hoilette | Jamaica | 48.2 | |
| 4 | 2 | Tony Harper | Bermuda | 48.8 | |
| 5 | 2 | Brian McLaren | Canada | 48.9 | |
| 6 | 2 | Leslie Miller | Bahamas | 51.2 | |
| 7 | 2 | Ephframe Robinson | Sierra Leone | 52.6 | |
| 1 | 3 | Daniel Rudisha | Kenya | 47.2 | Q |
| 2 | 3 | Kent Bernard | Trinidad and Tobago | 47.4 | Q |
| 3 | 3 | Felix Cameron | Jamaica | 49.3 | |
| 4 | 3 | Bertram Catwell | Barbados | 50.3 | |
| 5 | 3 | Nicholas Nicol | Sierra Leone | 51.5 | |
| | 3 | Ken Roche | Australia | DNS | |
| | 3 | Ajmer Singh | India | DNS | |
| 1 | 4 | Martin Winbolt-Lewis | England | 47.6 | Q |
| 2 | 4 | Amos Omolo | Uganda | 48.3 | Q |
| 3 | 4 | Howard Davies | Wales | 49.0 | |
| 4 | 4 | Noel Simons | Bermuda | 49.3 | |
| | 4 | Gary Eddy | Australia | DNS | |
| | 4 | James Addy | Ghana | DNS | |
| 1 | 5 | Bill Crothers | Canada | 47.2 | Q |
| 2 | 5 | John Adey | England | 47.4 | Q |
| 3 | 5 | Ezra Burnham | Barbados | 48.1 | q |
| 4 | 5 | Asuman Bawala | Uganda | 48.4 | |
| 5 | 5 | Wilbert Moss | Bahamas | 50.2 | |
| 6 | 5 | Aggrey Jacobs | Antigua and Barbuda | 50.8 | |
| 1 | 6 | Wendell Mottley | Trinidad and Tobago | 45.8 | Q |
| 2 | 6 | Tim Graham | England | 47.8 | Q |
| 3 | 6 | Wilson Kiprugut | Kenya | 47.8 | q |
| 4 | 6 | Benedict Majekodunmi | Nigeria | 48.3 | |
| 5 | 6 | Victor Peters | Saint Vincent and the Grenadines | 48.9 | |
| 6 | 6 | James Usher | British Honduras | 53.5 | |
| | 6 | Sahr Foyer | Sierra Leone | DQ | |
| 1 | 7 | Don Domansky | Canada | 47.0 | Q |
| 2 | 7 | Lloyd Bacchus | Guyana | 47.8 | Q |
| 3 | 7 | Malcolm Spence | Jamaica | 48.7 | |
| 4 | 7 | Manikavasagam Jegathesan | Malaysia | 48.9 | |
| 5 | 7 | George Odeke | Uganda | 49.0 | |
| 6 | 7 | Colin Davey | Bermuda | 50.2 | |
| | 7 | Anthony Cadogan | Barbados | DNF | |

=== Semifinals ===
Qualification: First 4 in each heat (Q) qualify directly for the final.

Semifinal heats results
| Rank | Heat | Name | Nationality | Time | Notes |
|---|---|---|---|---|---|
| 1 | 1 | Wendell Mottley | Trinidad and Tobago | 46.3 | Q |
| 2 | 1 | Bill Crothers | Canada | 46.8 | Q |
| 3 | 1 | Noel Clough | Australia | 47.30 | Q |
| 4 | 1 | Martin Winbolt-Lewis | England | 47.6 | Q |
| 5 | 1 | Tim Graham | England | 47.6 | |
| 6 | 1 | Wilson Kiprugut | Kenya | 47.9 | |
| 7 | 1 | Francis Hatega | Uganda | 48.2 | |
| 8 | 1 | Ezra Burnham | Barbados | 48.5 | |
| 1 | 2 | Don Domansky | Canada | 46.8 | Q |
| 2 | 2 | Kent Bernard | Trinidad and Tobago | 46.9 | Q |
| 3 | 2 | John Adey | England | 47.5 | Q |
| 4 | 2 | Daniel Rudisha | Kenya | 47.8 | Q |
| 5 | 2 | Lloyd Bacchus | Guyana | 47.8 | |
| 6 | 2 | Amos Omolo | Uganda | 47.9 | |
| 7 | 2 | Ross McKenzie | Canada | 47.9 | |
| | 2 | Edwin Skinner | Trinidad and Tobago | DNS | |

=== Final ===
Final results
| Rank | Name | Nationality | Time | Notes |
|---|---|---|---|---|
| 1st place, gold medalist(s) | Wendell Mottley | Trinidad and Tobago | 45.08 | GR |
| 2nd place, silver medalist(s) | Kent Bernard | Trinidad and Tobago | 46.06 | |
| 3rd place, bronze medalist(s) | Don Domansky | Canada | 46.42 | |
| 4 | Daniel Rudisha | Kenya | 46.5 | |
| 5 | Bill Crothers | Canada | 46.8 | |
| 6 | Martin Winbolt-Lewis | England | 47.1 | |
| 7 | John Adey | England | 47.3 | |
| 8 | Noel Clough | Australia | 47.53 | |
