= Athletics at the 1967 Pan American Games – Men's 800 metres =

Men's 800 metres at the Pan American Games

The men's 800 metres event at the 1967 Pan American Games was held in Winnipeg on 1 and 2 August.

== Medalists ==
Gold	Silver	Bronze
Wade Bell; United States	Bill Crothers; Canada	Brian MacLaren; Canada

== Results ==
=== Heats ===
Rank	Heat	Name	Nationality	Time	Notes
1	1	Brian MacLaren	Canada	1:50.70	Q
2	1	Wade Bell	United States	1:51.14	Q
3	1	Lennox Yearwood	Trinidad and Tobago	1:51.85	Q
4	1	Alex McDonald	Jamaica	1:52.10	Q
5	1	Federico Vera	Mexico	1:52.40	
6	2	Jere Van Dyk	United States	1:54.52	Q
7	2	Bill Crothers	Canada	1:54.54	Q
8	2	Neville Myton	Jamaica	1:54.63	Q
9	2	Roberto Silva	Mexico	1:54.99	Q
10	1	Orlando Gutiérrez	Colombia	1:55.24	
11	1	Jorge Arriaga	Peru	1:55.91	
12	2	Jorge Grosser	Chile	1:55.46	
13	2	Augusto Paredes	Peru	1:58.30	
14	2	Ricardo Leguiza	Argentina	1:58.96	
	2	Carver King	Trinidad and Tobago	DNS	

=== Final ===
Rank	Name	Nationality	Time	Notes
1st place, gold medalist(s)	Wade Bell	United States	1:49.20	
2nd place, silver medalist(s)	Bill Crothers	Canada	1:49.91	
3rd place, bronze medalist(s)	Brian MacLaren	Canada	1:50.31	
4	Jere Van Dyk	United States	1:50.53	
5	Alex McDonald	Jamaica	1:52.30	
6	Neville Myton	Jamaica	1:52.58	
7	Lennox Yearwood	Trinidad and Tobago	1:52.86	
8	Roberto Silva	Mexico	1:53.45	
