= Howard Davies (sprinter) =

British sprinter (born 1944)

Personal information
- Nationality: British (Welsh)
- Born: 5 August 1944 (age 81) Newport, Wales
- Height: 178 cm (5 ft 10 in)
- Weight: 69 kg (152 lb)

Sport
- Sport: Athletics
- Event: Sprints/400 metres
- Club: Newport Harriers
Medal record
Representing Great Britain
Summer Universiade
Silver medal – second place	1967 Tokyo	4x400m relay

Howard Grenville Davies (born 5 August 1944) is a British former sprinter who competed at the 1968 Summer Olympics.

== Biography ==
Davies represented the 1966 Welsh team at the 1966 British Empire and Commonwealth Games in Kingston, Jamaica, participating in two events; the 220 yards and the 440 yards.

Davies finished second behind Tim Graham in the 440 yards event at the 1967 AAA Championships and second behind Martin Winbolt Lewis in the 440 yards event at the 1968 AAA Championships

At the 1968 Olympic Games in Mexico City, he represented Great Britain in the men's 400 metres competition.
