= Athletics at the 1966 British Empire and Commonwealth Games – Men's triple jump =

Men's triple jump at the 1966 British Empire and Commonwealth Games
- Venue: Independence Park, Kingston
- Dates: August 11, 1966

Medalists
gold medal	Samuel Igun	Nigeria
silver medal	George Ogan	Nigeria
bronze medal	Frederick Alsop	England

The men's triple jump event at the 1966 British Empire and Commonwealth Games was held on 11 August at the Independence Park in Kingston, Jamaica.

== Results ==
Final results
Rank	Name	Nationality	Distance	Notes
1st place, gold medalist(s)	Samuel Igun	Nigeria	53 ft 9 3/4 in (16.40 m)	
2nd place, silver medalist(s)	George Ogan	Nigeria	52 ft 9 in (16.08 m)	
3rd place, bronze medalist(s)	Frederick Alsop	England	52 ft 4 1/2 in (15.96 m)	
4	Tim Barrett	Bahamas	51 ft 7 1/4 in (15.73 m)	
5	Dave Norris	New Zealand	50 ft 11 in (15.52 m)	
6	Mahoney Samuels	Jamaica	50 ft 9 1/4 in (15.47 m)	
7	Lennox Burgher	Jamaica	49 ft 10 in (15.19 m)	
8	Victor Brooks	Jamaica	49 ft 4 3/4 in (15.06 m)	
9	Trevor Thomas	Jamaica	49 ft 0 1/4 in (14.94 m)	
10	Phil May	Australia	48 ft 11 1/2 in (14.92 m)	
11	Hartley Saunders	Bahamas	48 ft 10 3/4 in (14.90 m)	
12	James Ocen-Bowa	Uganda	48 ft 10 1/4 in (14.89 m)	
13	Johnson Amoah	Ghana	48 ft 10 1/4 in (14.89 m)	
14	John Okuthe	Kenya	48 ft 3 in (14.71 m)	
15	John Morbey	Bermuda	46 ft 1 3/4 in (14.07 m)	
16	Maxime Anthony	Mauritius	45 ft 9 1/4 in (13.95 m)	
17	Erskine Norris	Barbados	45 ft 3 in (13.79 m)	
18	Lawrie Peckham	Australia	45 ft 1 in (13.74 m)	
	Victor Peters	Saint Vincent and the Grenadines	NM	
