= Athletics at the 1966 British Empire and Commonwealth Games – Men's long jump =

Men's long jump at the 1966 British Empire and Commonwealth Games
- Venue: Independence Park, Kingston
- Dates: August 8, 1966

Medalists
gold medal	Lynn Davies	Wales
silver medal	John Morbey	Bermuda
bronze medal	Wellesley Clayton	Jamaica

The men's long jump event at the 1966 British Empire and Commonwealth Games was held on 8 August at the Independence Park in Kingston, Jamaica.

== Results ==
Final results
Rank	Name	Nationality	Distance	Notes
1st place, gold medalist(s)	Lynn Davies	Wales	26 ft 2 3/4 in (7.99 m)	
2nd place, silver medalist(s)	John Morbey	Bermuda	25 ft 10 3/4 in (7.89 m)	
3rd place, bronze medalist(s)	Wellesley Clayton	Jamaica	25 ft 8 1/4 in (7.83 m)	
4	Allen Crawley	Australia	25 ft 6 3/4 in (7.79 m)	
5	Victor Brooks	Jamaica	25 ft 1 1/4 in (7.65 m)	
6	Phil May	Australia	24 ft 7 1/4 in (7.50 m)	
7	Dave Norris	New Zealand	24 ft 6 1/4 in (7.47 m)	
8	Julius Sang	Kenya	24 ft 4 in (7.42 m)	
9	Johnson Amoah	Ghana	23 ft 10 3/4 in (7.28 m)	
10	George Ogan	Nigeria	23 ft 4 in (7.11 m)	
11	Byron Lewis	Jamaica	22 ft 11 1/2 in (7.00 m)	
12	Fred Alsop	England	22 ft 10 3/4 in (6.98 m)	
13	Dave Gaskin	England	22 ft 8 in (6.91 m)	
14	Randolph Benjamin	Bermuda	22 ft 4 1/2 in (6.82 m)	
15	Alvin Young	Jamaica	22 ft 2 3/4 in (6.78 m)	
16	Jerry Wisdom	Bahamas	21 ft 10 1/2 in (6.67 m)	
17	Maxime Anthony	Mauritius	21 ft 8 1/2 in (6.62 m)	
18	Silas Tita	Papua New Guinea	18 ft 6 1/2 in (5.65 m)	
