= Edwin Skinner =

Trinidad and Tobago sprinter

Olympic medal record

Men's Athletics
Bronze medal – third place	1964 Tokyo	4x400 metre relay

Edwin Joseph Skinner (born 15 October 1940) was a Trinidadian athlete who competed mainly in the 400 metres.

He competed for Trinidad and Tobago in the 1964 Summer Olympics held in Tokyo, Japan in the 4 x 400 metre relay where he won the bronze medal with his team mates Kent Bernard, Edwin Roberts and Wendell Mottley.

== International competitions ==
Year	Competition	Venue	Position	Event	Notes
Representing Trinidad and Tobago
1964	Olympic Games	Tokyo, Japan	8th	400 m	46.8
1964	Olympic Games	Tokyo, Japan	3rd	4 × 400 m relay	3:01.7
1966	Central American and Caribbean Games	San Juan, Puerto Rico	4th	400 m	47.1
1966	Central American and Caribbean Games	San Juan, Puerto Rico	2nd	4 × 400 m relay	3:09.4
1966	British Empire and Commonwealth Games	Kingston, Jamaica	15th (h)	440 y	48.2^{1}

^{1}Did not start in the semifinals
