= Victor Brooks =

Victor Brooks is the name of

- Victor Brooks (actor) (1918–2000), English actor
- Victor Brooks (athlete) (born 1941), Jamaican long jumper
