= Bob Hughes (athlete) =

British racewalker

Personal information
- Nationality: British (English)
- Born: 27 October 1947 (age 78) Smethwick. West Midlands, England
- Height: 169 cm (5 ft 7 in)
- Weight: 70 kg (154 lb)

Sport
- Sport: Athletics
- Event: Racewalking
- Club: Royal Sutton Coldfield WC

Robert Peter Hughes (born 27 October 1947) is a British former racewalker who competed at the 1968 Summer Olympics.

== Biography ==
Hughes finished third behind Ron Wallwork in the 2 miles walk event and finished third behind Malcolm Tolley in the 7 miles walk event at the 1967 AAA Championships and the following year finished runner-up to Arthur Jones in the 2 miles walk event at the 1968 AAA Championships

At the 1968 Olympic Games in Mexico City, he represented Great Britain in the men's 20 kilometres walk competition.
