= Athletics at the 1963 Pan American Games – Men's high jump =

Men's high jump at the Pan American Games

The men's high jump event at the 1963 Pan American Games was held at the Pacaembu Stadium in São Paulo on 27 April.

== Results ==
Rank	Name	Nationality	Result	Notes
1st place, gold medalist(s)	Gene Johnson	United States	2.11	
2nd place, silver medalist(s)	Teodoro Flores	Guatemala	2.04	
3rd place, bronze medalist(s)	Anton Norris	Barbados	2.04	
4	Ralph Boston	United States	2.04	
5	Eleutorio Fassi	Argentina	1.95	
6	Roberto Abugattás	Peru	1.95	
7	Manoel César	Brazil	1.90	
8	Roberto Procel	Mexico	1.90	
9	Marcos Silveira	Brazil	1.80	
	Luiz Alzamora	Peru	DNS	
