= Wellesley Clayton =

Jamaican long jumper (born 1938)

Wellesley Kenneth Clayton (born 25 August 1938) is a Jamaican former long jumper who competed in the 1964 Summer Olympics and in the 1968 Summer Olympics.

Clayton was an All-American sprinter and jumper for the USC Trojans track and field team, finishing 3rd in the 4 × 100 meters relay at the 1964 NCAA University Division track and field championships and also 4th in the long jump at the 1964 NCAA University Division track and field championships and 1965 NCAA University Division outdoor track and field championships.

He established himself among the Caribbean's best jumpers at the Central American and Caribbean Games, taking the silver medal in 1962, then the gold medal in 1966 – Jamaica's second ever games winner in that event, after Deryck Taylor. In 1966 he was also in Jamaica's gold medal-winning 4×100 metres relay team. He enjoyed a variety of successes at the British West Indies Championships: after a long jump bronze in 1959 and a pentathlon silver in 1960, he won two straight long jump titles in 1964 to 1965, as well as the 1964 110 metres hurdles title.

He was twice a bronze medallist in the long jump at the British Empire and Commonwealth Games, 1962 and again in 1966. He followed this with another bronze medal at the 1967 Pan American Games.

== International competitions ==
Year	Competition	Venue	Position	Event	Notes
Representing Jamaica
1959	British West Indies Championships	Georgetown, British Guiana	3rd	Long jump	7.01 m
1960	British West Indies Championships	Kingston, Jamaica	2nd	Pentathlon	2289 pts
1962	Central American and Caribbean Games	Kingston, Jamaica	22nd (h)	100 m	11.1 s
1962	Central American and Caribbean Games	Kingston, Jamaica	2nd	Long jump	7.60 m
1962	British Empire and Commonwealth Games	Perth, Australia	3rd	Long jump	7.73 m
1964	British West Indies Championships	Kingston, Jamaica	1st	110 m hurdles	15.6 s
1964	British West Indies Championships	Kingston, Jamaica	1st	Long jump	7.47 m
1965	British West Indies Championships	Bridgetown, Barbados	1st	Long jump	7.26 m
1966	Central American and Caribbean Games	San Juan, Puerto Rico	1st	4 × 100 m relay	40.5 s
1966	Central American and Caribbean Games	San Juan, Puerto Rico	1st	Long jump	7.64 m
1966	British Empire and Commonwealth Games	Kingston, Jamaica	2nd	4 × 110 y relay	40.0 s
1966	British Empire and Commonwealth Games	Kingston, Jamaica	3rd	Long jump	7.83 m
1967	Pan American Games	Winnipeg, Canada	5th	4 × 100 m relay	40.23
1967	Pan American Games	Winnipeg, Canada	3rd	Long jump	7.76 m
1968	Olympic Games	Mexico City, Mexico	23rd (q)	Long jump	7.57 m
