= Athletics at the 1967 Pan American Games – Men's high jump =

Men's high jump at the Pan American Games

The men's high jump event at the 1967 Pan American Games was held in Winnipeg on 30 July.

== Results ==
Rank	Name	Nationality	Result	Notes
1st place, gold medalist(s)	Ed Caruthers	United States	2.19	
2nd place, silver medalist(s)	Otis Burrell	United States	2.16	
3rd place, bronze medalist(s)	Roberto Abugattás	Peru	2.05	
4	Wilf Wedmann	Canada	1.99	
4	Teodoro Flores	Guatemala	1.99	
6	Roberto Pozzi	Argentina	1.99	
7	Cristian Errazuriz	Chile	1.95	
8	Euletorio Fassi	Argentina	1.95	
9	Anton Norris	Barbados	1.95	
10	Anthony Balfour	Bahamas	1.95	
11	Dennis Firth	Canada	1.90	
