= 1968 AAA Championships =

Outdoor track and field competition

- Dates: 12–13 July 1968
- Host city: London, England
- Venue: White City Stadium
- Level: Senior
- Type: Outdoor

The 1968 AAA Championships was the 1968 edition of the annual outdoor track and field competition organised by the Amateur Athletic Association (AAA). It was held from 12 to 13 July 1968 at White City Stadium in London, England.

== Summary ==
The Championships covered two days of competition. The marathon was held in Cwmbran and the decathlon event was held in Crystal Palace.

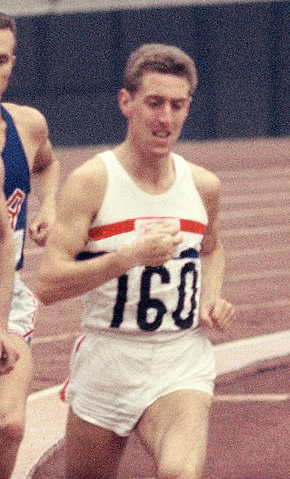
John Whetton won the mile

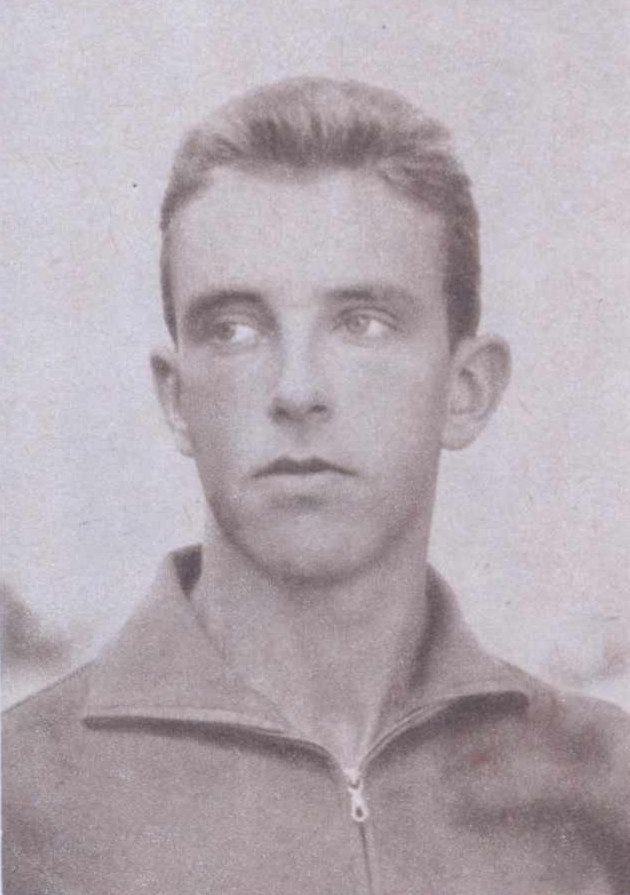
Șerban Ciochină

== Results ==
Event	Gold		Silver		Bronze	
100 yards	(South Africa) Paul Nash	9.87	(Wales) Ron Jones	9.92	Barrie Kelly	9.94
220 yards	(South Africa) Paul Nash	21.20	Ralph Banthorpe	21.36	Dick Steane	21.42
440 yards	Martin Winbolt-Lewis	46.88	(Wales) Howard Davies	46.98	Colin Campbell	47.08
880 yards	Noel Carroll	1:50.02	John Davies	1:50.10	John Boulter	1:50.24
1 mile	John Whetton	4:06.01	Walter Wilkinson	4:06.26	Kenneth Riley	4:06.26
3 miles	(Scotland) Lachie Stewart	13:28.4	Colin Robinson	13:29.6	(Scotland) Ian Stewart	13:29.8
6 miles	Tim Johnston	27:22.17 NR	Mike Tagg	27:26.25	(Scotland) Jim Alder	27:28.50
10 miles	Ron Hill	47:02.2 WR	Kenneth Lee	49:09.4	Richard Hayman	49:31.6
marathon	Tim Johnston	2:15:26	Bill Adcocks	2:15:41	(Scotland) Jim Alder	2:16:37
steeplechase	Gareth Bryan-Jones	8:36.2	John Jackson	8:37.8	Maurice Herriott	8:39.2
120y hurdles	Alan Pascoe	14.1	Mike Parker	14.2	Stuart Storey	14.2
440y hurdles	David Hemery	50.19 NR	John Sherwood	50.82	John Cooper	51.32
2 miles walk	Arthur Jones	13:35.6	Bob Hughes	13:41.4	Arthur Thomson	13:47.8
7 miles walk	Paul Nihill	51:10.4	Shaun Lightman	51:45.0	Arthur Thomson	51:45.2
high jump	(United States) Dan Mendenhall	2.083	(United States) Ed Hanks	2.057	(Italy) Marco Schivo	2.032
pole vault	(Italy) Renato Dionisi	5.03	Mike Bull	4.87	(Italy) Aldo Righi	4.72
long jump	(Wales) Lynn Davies	7.94	(Japan) Hiroomi Yamada	7.64	Peter Reed	7.50
triple jump	(Romania) Șerban Ciochină	16.03	Fred Alsop	15.87	Graham Hamlyn	15.82
shot put	Jeff Teale	17.74	(Scotland) Mike Lindsay	17.22	Martyn Lucking	16.72
discus throw	Bill Tancred	53.06	Arthur McKenzie	51.36	John Watts	50.96
hammer throw	(Hungary) Lázár Lovász	66.20	(Japan) Takeo Sugawara	66.10	(Japan) Yoshihisa Ishida	62.14
javelin throw	Dave Travis	72.16	Tony Edwards	71.66	John McSorley	67.04
decathlon	Peter Gabbett	7247	Dave Travis	6944	(Scotland) Norman Foster	6790

== See also ==
- 1968 WAAA Championships
