= Rupert Hoilette =

Jamaican sprinter (1946–2023)

Rupert L. Hoilette (24 June 1946 – 6 October 2023) was a Jamaican sprinter who competed in the 1964 Summer Olympics.

Outside of the Olympics, he was the 400 metres runner-up and a 4 × 400 metres relay gold medallist at the 1966 Central American and Caribbean Games. He also won a relay bronze at the 1963 Pan American Games. Hoilette was the 400 m champion at the 1964 British West Indies Championships.

Hoilette died in Kingston on 6 October 2023, at the age of 77.

== International competitions ==
Year	Competition	Venue	Position	Event	Notes
Representing Jamaica
1963	Pan American Games	São Paulo, Brazil	3rd	4 × 400 m relay	3:12.61
1964	British West Indies Championships	Kingston, Jamaica	1st	400 m	47.2
1964	Olympic Games	Tokyo, Japan	22nd (qf)	400 m	47.6
1966	Central American and Caribbean Games	San Juan, Puerto Rico	2nd	400 m	47.03
1966	Central American and Caribbean Games	San Juan, Puerto Rico	1st	4 × 400 m relay	3:08.8
1966	British Empire and Commonwealth Games	Kingston, Jamaica	15th (h)	440 y	48.2
1966	British Empire and Commonwealth Games	Kingston, Jamaica	4th	4 × 440 y relay	3:06.8
