= Neville Myton =

Jamaican middle-distance runner (1946–2021)

Neville Myton (28 May 1946 – 19 May 2021) was a Jamaican middle distance runner who competed in the 1964 Summer Olympics and in the 1968 Summer Olympics. He was a double gold medallist at the 1966 Central American and Caribbean Games, taking the individual 800 metres title and also sharing in the team gold medals with the Jamaican 4×400 metres relay team. He won a bronze medal in the 4×400 metre relay at the 1967 Pan American Games.

Myton set a national junior record in Jamaica when he finished the 800m race in 1:47.2 minutes at the 1964 Olympics. At the time of his death, this record still stood.

He also competed in the 1500 metres, taking a silver at the 1964 British West Indies Championships and gold at the 1965 British West Indies Championships.

Myton resided in Florida until his death, with his wife Joy.

== International competitions ==
Year	Competition	Venue	Position	Event	Notes
Representing Jamaica
1964	British West Indies Championships	Kingston, Jamaica	2nd	1500 m	3:53.7
1964	Olympic Games	Tokyo, Japan	34th (h)	800 m	1:52.4
1964	Olympic Games	Tokyo, Japan	39th (h)	1500 m	3:57.0
1965	British West Indies Championships	Bridgetown, Barbados	1st	1500 m	4:03.4
1966	Central American and Caribbean Games	San Juan, Puerto Rico	1st	800 m	1:50.2
1966	Central American and Caribbean Games	San Juan, Puerto Rico	1st	4 × 400 m relay	3:08.8
1966	British Empire and Commonwealth Games	Kingston, Jamaica	–	880 y	DNF
1967	Pan American Games	Winnipeg, Canada	12th (sf)	400 m	48.47
1967	Pan American Games	Winnipeg, Canada	6th	800 m	1:52.58
1967	Pan American Games	Winnipeg, Canada	3rd	4 × 400 m relay	3:05.99
1968	Olympic Games	Mexico City, Mexico	–	800 m	DNF
1970	Central American and Caribbean Games	Panama City, Panama	10th	1500 m	3:55.8
1970	British Commonwealth Games	Edinburgh, United Kingdom	13th (sf)	800 m	1:50.4
1971	Central American and Caribbean Championships	Kingston, Jamaica	8th	800 m	1:53.4

== Personal bests ==
Outdoors

- 800 metres – 1:46.6h (Kingston 1964)
