= Anton Norris =

Barbadian high jumper

Personal information
- Full name: Erskine Anton Norris
- Born: 7 January 1940 (age 86) Kirtons, Saint Philip, Barbados

Sport
- Country: Barbados
- Sport: Athletics
- Event: High jump
Medal record
Men's athletics
Representing Barbados
British Empire and Commonwealth Games
Bronze medal – third place	1962 Perth	High jump
Bronze medal – third place	1966 Kingston	High jump
Pan American Games
Bronze medal – third place	1963 São Paulo	High jump
Central American and Caribbean Games
Silver medal – second place	1962 Kingston	High jump
Silver medal – second place	1966 San Juan	High jump
- Cricket career

Cricket information
- Batting: Right-handed
- Bowling: Right-arm fast
- Role: Bowler

Domestic team information
- Years: Team
- 1963: Barbados
- Only First-class: 8 February 1963 Barbados v British Guiana

Career statistics
Competition	FC
Matches	1
Runs scored	10
Batting average	-
100s/50s	0/0
Top score	10*
Balls bowled	132
Wickets	0
Bowling average	-
5 wickets in innings	0
10 wickets in match	0
Best bowling	0/11
Catches/stumpings	0/0
- Source: CricketArchive, 30 June 2014

Erskine Anton Norris (born 7 January 1940) is a former Barbadian high jumper.

== Athletic career ==
Norris was born in Kirtons, Saint Philip, and first represented Barbados at the 1962 Central American and Caribbean Games in Kingston, Jamaica where he won silver in high jump with a jump of 1.98 metres. Three months later at the 1962 British Empire and Commonwealth Games in Perth, Western Australia, Norris won bronze in the high jump clearing the bar at 6 ft 8 in (2.03 m). In doing so, he became the first athlete to win a bronze medal for Barbados and the first athlete to win a medal of any colour in a sport besides weightlifting for Barbados at the Commonwealth Games. The following year, Norris was part of the inaugural contingent to represent Barbados at the 1963 Pan American Games in São Paulo, Brazil. There he won one of the first medals for his country, bronze in high jump. In 1966, he repeated his performance of four year prior in taking the silver medal at the San Juan Central American and Caribbean Games in the high jump and the bronze in high jump at the Kingston British Empire and Commonwealth Games.

Norris was also a cricketer who played in one first-class cricket match for Barbados in February 1963 against British Guiana. Norris, selected in the team is a right-arm fast bowler, took no wickets in the match which British Guiana won by 34 runs.

== Business career ==
Norris holds an MBA degree in Management and International Business from New York University Graduate School of Business Administration, and a Bachelor of Arts degree with honours in Economics and Business Administration from the Interamerican University of Puerto Rico.

Norris has worked in business development for most of his career, while a senior executive of the Barbados Investment and Development Corporation, where he served as a Divisional Director and acting CEO. He was also Director of the Corporation's North American Operations, based in New York. He has assisted the promotion, start-up and development of a large number of local and international businesses and successfully implemented several technical assistance initiatives.

As a consultant, Anton also served as Regional Technical Advisor to the Investment Promotion and Export Development (IPED) Project, in the Economic Affairs Secretariat of the Organisation of Eastern Caribbean States, under the aegis of the United States Agency for International Development (USAID). As of March 2009, Norris was an associate consultant of May Hinds Consulting.

== International competitions ==
Year	Competition	Venue	Position	Event	Notes
Representing Barbados
1959	British West Indies Championships	Georgetown, British Guiana	3rd	High jump	1.90 m
1962	Central American and Caribbean Games	Kingston, Jamaica	2nd	High jump	1.98 m
1962	British Empire and Commonwealth Games	Perth, Australia	3rd	High jump	2.03 m
1963	Pan American Games	São Paulo, Brazil	3rd	High jump	2.04 m
1964	British West Indies Championships	Kingston, Jamaica	2nd	High jump	1.90 m
1965	British West Indies Championships	Bridgetown, Barbados	2nd	High jump	2.00 m
1966	Central American and Caribbean Games	San Juan, Puerto Rico	2nd	High jump	1.98 m
1966	Central American and Caribbean Games	San Juan, Puerto Rico	9th	Triple jump	14.37 m
1966	British Empire and Commonwealth Games	Kingston, Jamaica	2nd	High jump	2.00 m
1966	British Empire and Commonwealth Games	Kingston, Jamaica	17th	Triple jump	13.79 m
1967	Pan American Games	Winnipeg, Canada	9th	High jump	1.95 m
