= Teodoro Palacios =

Guatemalan high jumper (1939–2019)

Personal information
- Full name: Teodoro Francisco Palacios Flores
- Born: 7 January 1939 Guatemala City, Guatemala
- Died: 17 August 2019 (aged 80)
- Height: 1.83 m (6 ft 0 in)
- Weight: 68 kg (150 lb)
Medal record
Men's Athletics
Representing Guatemala
Central American and Caribbean Games
Gold medal – first place	1959 Caracas	High jump
Gold medal – first place	1962 Kingston	High jump
Gold medal – first place	1966 San Juan	High jump
Silver medal – second place	1970 Panama City	High jump
Ibero-American Games
Gold medal – first place	1960 Santiago	High jump
Gold medal – first place	1962 Madrid	High jump
1963 Pan American Games
Silver medal – second place	1963 São Paulo	High jump

Teodoro Francisco Palacios Flores (Note: In this Spanish name, the first or paternal surname is Palacios and the second or maternal family name is Flores.) (7 January 1939 – 17 August 2019) was a Guatemalan high jumper who competed in the 1968 Summer Olympics and won the silver medal at the 1963 Pan American Games. Teodoro's son is Grammy nominated American composer Marcos "Kosine" Palacios, of the production group, Da Internz.

Palacios died on 17 August 2019 at 15.10 CET in Krankenhaus Roosevelt in Guatemala. He was 80.

His personal best in the event was 2.105 metres set in 1960.

== International competitions ==
Year	Competition	Venue	Position	Notes
Representing Guatemala
1959	Central American and Caribbean Games	Caracas, Venezuela	1st	1.91 m
1959	Pan American Games	Chicago, United States	4th	1.98 m
1960	Ibero-American Games	Santiago, Chile	1st	1.95 m
1962	Central American and Caribbean Games	Kingston, Jamaica	1st	2.00 m
1962	Ibero-American Games	Madrid, Spain	1st	2.00 m
1963	Pan American Games	São Paulo, Brazil	2nd	2.04 m
1966	Central American and Caribbean Games	San Juan, Puerto Rico	1st	2.03 m
1967	Pan American Games	Winnipeg, Canada	4th	1.99 m
1967	Central American and Caribbean Championships	Xalapa, Mexico	1st	2.05 m
1968	Olympic Games	Mexico City, Mexico	22nd (q)	2.06 m
1970	Central American and Caribbean Games	Panama City, Panama	2nd	1.98 m
