= Orlanda Lynch =

Surinamese track and field athlete

Personal information
- Nationality: Surinamese
- Born: 29 January 1947 (age 79) Surinam

Sport
- Sport: Athletics
- Event(s): Discus, Shot put, Javelin and Sprinting

Achievements and titles
- Personal best: 40.52 m in discus (1976)
Medal record
Representing Suriname
CAC Championships
Bronze medal – third place	1971 Kingston	Discus
Bronze medal – third place	1971 Kingston	Shot Put
Bronze medal – third place	1975 Ponce	Shot Put

Orlanda Lynch (born 29 January 1947) is a Surinamese former discus thrower, shot putter, javelin thrower and sprinter. She is best known for winning bronze medals in both the discus and the shot put at the 1971 Central American and Caribbean Championships in Athletics in Kingston, Jamaica and for winning a bronze medal in the shot put in the 1975 Central American and Caribbean Championships in Athletics in Ponce, Puerto Rico.

Lynch also represented Suriname at the 1974 Central American and Caribbean Games in Santo Domingo and the 1978 Central American and Caribbean Games in Medellín, Colombia. In addition, she also represented Suriname at the 1975 Pan American Games in Mexico City, placing eighth in the shot put and tenth in the discus.

Lynch is still the female Surinamese record holder in the discus, with a throw of 40.52 metres set on 7 March 1976 in Paramaribo.

== International competitions ==
Year	Competition	Venue	Position	Event	Notes
Representing Suriname
1971	Central American and Caribbean Championships	Kingston, Jamaica	3rd	Shot put	10.20 m
1971	Central American and Caribbean Championships	Kingston, Jamaica	3rd	Discus throw	34.02 m
1971	Central American and Caribbean Championships	Kingston, Jamaica	6th	Javelin throw (old)	31.32 m
1974	Central American and Caribbean Games	Santo Domingo, Dominican Republic	6th	Shot put	11.57 m
1974	Central American and Caribbean Games	Santo Domingo, Dominican Republic	5th	Discus throw	37.54 m
1974	Central American and Caribbean Games	Santo Domingo, Dominican Republic	7th	Javelin throw (old)	34.88 m
1975	Central American and Caribbean Championships	Ponce, Puerto Rico	3rd	Shot put	12.91 m
1975	Pan American Games	Mexico City, Mexico	8th	Shot put	12.70 m
1975	Pan American Games	Mexico City, Mexico	10th	Discus throw	37.29 m
1978	Central American and Caribbean Games	Medellín, Colombia	7th	Shot put	12.02 m
1978	Central American and Caribbean Games	Medellín, Colombia	6th	Discus throw	36.00 m
