= Peter Seddon =

British athlete

Personal information
- Nationality: British (English)
- Born: 4 March 1937 (age 88) Bolton, Lancashire, England

Sport
- Sport: Athletics
- Event: hammer throw
- Club: Army AC

Peter Owen Seddon (born 4 March 1937), is a male former athlete who competed for England.

== Biography ==
Seddon was selected by England to represent his country in athletics events and was the British Army and Lancashire champion.

He represented the England team in the hammer throw, at the 1966 British Empire and Commonwealth Games in Kingston, Jamaica.

Seddon finished third behind Ed Burke in the hammer throw event at the 1967 AAA Championships.
