= Rodolfo Gómez (Nicaraguan athlete) =

Nicaraguan long-distance runner

Personal information
- Nationality: Nicaraguan
- Born: 9 August 1946 (age 79)
- Height: 1.73 m (5 ft 8 in)
- Weight: 57 kg (126 lb)

Sport
- Sport: Long-distance running
- Event: Marathon

Rodolfo Gómez (born 9 August 1946) is a retired Nicaraguan long-distance runner. He competed in the marathon at the 1972 Summer Olympics.

== International competitions ==
Year	Competition	Venue	Position	Event	Notes
Representing Nicaragua
1970	Central American and Caribbean Games	Panama City, Panama	17th	5000 m	16:45.0
1971	Central American and Caribbean Championships	Kingston, Jamaica	7th	Half marathon	1:22:27
1971	Central American and Caribbean Championships	Kingston, Jamaica	8th	3000 m s'chase	10:38.8
1972	Olympic Games	Munich, West Germany	–	Marathon	DNF

== Personal bests ==
- Marathon – 2:45:11 (1969)
