= Ezra Burnham =

Barbadian sprinter (1947–1973)

Personal information
- Full name: Ezra Ellsworth Burnham
- Born: 4 April 1947 Saint James, Barbados
- Died: 17 February 1973 (aged 25) Raleigh, North Carolina, United States
- Height: 1.73 m (5 ft 8 in)
- Weight: 64 kg (141 lb)

Sport
- Sport: Sprinting
- Event: 400 metres

Ezra Ellsworth Burnham (4 April 1947 – 17 February 1973) was a Barbadian sprinter. Born in Saint James, Barbados, Burnham was part of Coleridge & Parry School's athletics team during the 1960s and had won multiple titles at the time. He was one of the first Barbadian Olympians after he was part of the team at the 1968 Summer Olympics. He was eliminated in the heats of the men's 400 metres.

After the Games, he had received an athletic scholarship in Little Rock, Arkansas. He then resided in Raleigh, North Carolina, though died on 20 February 1973 after he had crashed his car on a utility pole.

== Biography ==
Ezra Ellsworth Burnham was born on 4 April 1947 in Saint James, Barbados, to Marion Elise Burnham, a housekeeper, and Gideon Burnham, a mechanic. Ezra had seven siblings. He studied at Coleridge & Parry School and was part of its athletics team that had won multiple titles during the 1960s; he was teammates with fellow Olympian and sprinter Hadley Hinds.

He was part of the first Barbadian team to compete at a Summer Olympics, having done so at the 1968 Summer Olympics in Mexico City, Mexico. Burnham competed in the first heat of the men's 400 metres on 16 October against five other athletes; eventual winner Lee Evans, Claver Kamanya, Christian Nicolau, Sam Bugri, and Manfred Kinder. He ran in a time of 47.9 seconds, placing last in his heat and did not advance further. After the Games, he had received an athletics scholarship to the United States in Little Rock, Arkansas. He was one of the first Barbadian Olympians to earn an athletics scholarship to the country. He set a new personal best time in the men's 400 metres at a competition in 1972, recording a time of 47.2 seconds.

Burnham eventually settled in Raleigh, North Carolina. On 17 February 1973, he died in the morning after he had lost control of his car and had struck a utility pole, hurling him out the car. He was 25 years old.

== International competitions ==
Year	Competition	Venue	Position	Event	Notes
Representing Barbados
1966	Central American and Caribbean Games	San Juan, Puerto Rico	11th (sf)	400 m	50.0
1966	Central American and Caribbean Games	San Juan, Puerto Rico	6th	4 × 400 m relay	3:17.0
1966	British Empire and Commonwealth Games	Kingston, Jamaica	15th (sf)	440 y	48.5
1966	British Empire and Commonwealth Games	Kingston, Jamaica	7th	4 × 440 y relay	3:12.9
1968	Olympic Games	Mexico City, Mexico	45th (h)	400 m	47.94
