= Rolando Gómez =

Dominican Republic sprinter

Personal information
- Nationality: Dominican
- Born: 10 November 1944 (age 81) Concepción de la Vega, Dominican Republic
- Height: 1.60 m (5 ft 3 in)
- Weight: 67 kg (148 lb)

Sport
- Sport: Sprinting
- Event: 400 metres

Rolando Gómez (born 10 November 1944) is a Dominican Republic sprinter. He competed in the men's 4 × 400 metres relay at the 1968 Summer Olympics.

== International competitions ==
Year	Competition	Venue	Position	Event	Notes
Representing the Dominican Republic
1966	Central American and Caribbean Games	San Juan, Puerto Rico	22nd (h)	100 m	11.2
1966	Central American and Caribbean Games	San Juan, Puerto Rico	31st (h)	200 m	24.1
1966	Central American and Caribbean Games	San Juan, Puerto Rico	5th	4 × 100 m relay	41.0
1968	Olympic Games	Mexico City, Mexico	16th (h)	4 × 400 m relay	3:19.42
