= 1967 AAA Championships =

Outdoor track and field competition

- Dates: 14–15 July 1967
- Host city: London, England
- Venue: White City Stadium
- Level: Senior
- Type: Outdoor

The 1967 AAA Championships was the 1967 edition of the annual outdoor track and field competition organised by the Amateur Athletic Association (AAA). It was held from 14 to 15 July 1967 at White City Stadium in London, England.

== Summary ==
The Championships covered two days of competition. The marathon was held in Nuneaton and the decathlon event was held in Hurlingham.

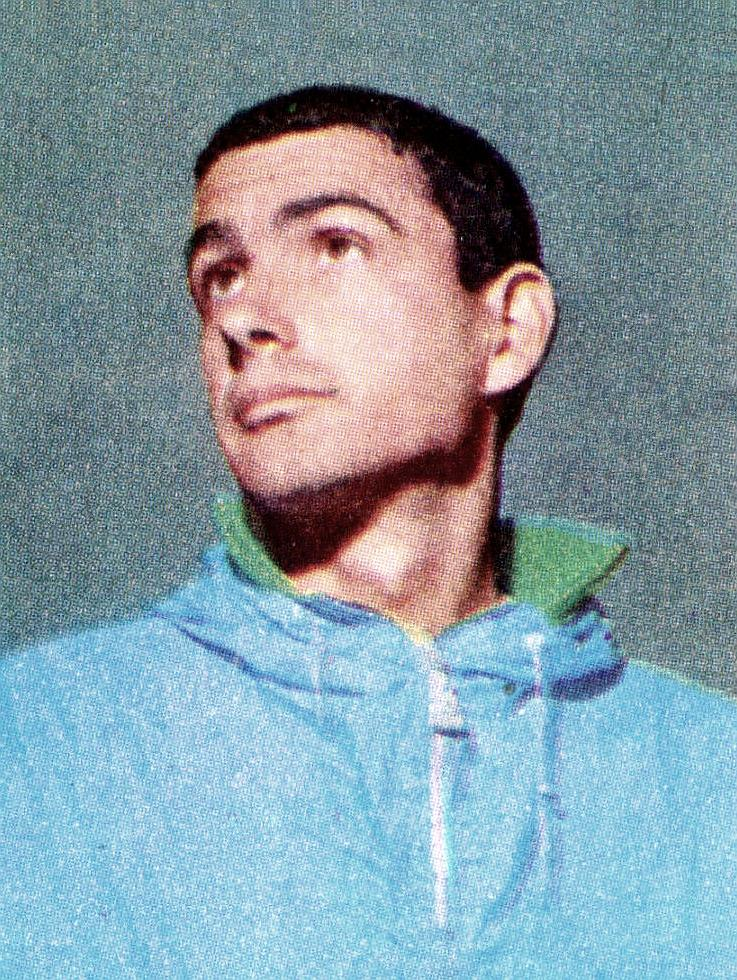
Australian Ron Clarke won his third consecutive 3 miles title

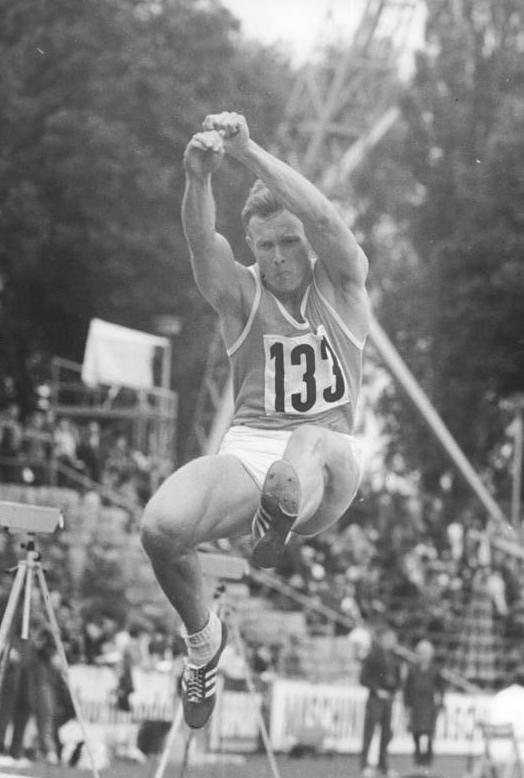
Max Klauss

== Results ==
Event	Gold		Silver		Bronze	
100 yards	Barrie Kelly	9.91	(Wales) Ron Jones	9.92	(Greece) Haris Aivaliotis	9.95
220 yards	(Scotland) Menzies Campbell	21.40	Mick Hauck	21.58	Dick Steane	21.75
440 yards	Tim Graham	46.62	(Wales) Howard Davies	47.28	Colin Campbell	47.42
880 yards	John Boulter	1:47.34 NR	(Republic of Ireland) Noel Carroll	1:47.63	(United States) Keith Colburn	1:47.94
1 mile	Andy Green	4:00.61	John Whetton	4:00.74	Alan Simpson	4:01.06
3 miles	(Australia) Ron Clarke	12:59.62	(Hungary) Lajos Mecser	13:03.39	(Scotland) Ian McCafferty	13:09.92
6 miles	(East Germany) Jürgen Haase	27:33.14	(Hungary) Lajos Mecser	27:35.86	(Scotland) Lachie Stewart	27:39.20
10 miles	Ron Hill	47:38.6	(Scotland) Fergus Murray	47:45.2	Mke Turner	47:51.4
marathon	(Scotland) Jim Alder	2:16:08	(Scotland) Alastair Wood	2:16:21	(Scotland) Don Macgregor	2:17:19
steeplechase	Maurice Herriott	8:33.8	Ernie Pomfret	8:37.0	Gerry Stevens	8:40.2
120y hurdles	(Italy) Eddy Ottoz	14.0	Alan Pascoe	14.3	Andy Todd	14.3
440y hurdles	John Sherwood	50.94 NR	Andy Todd	52.02	Peter Warden	52.06
2 miles walk	Ron Wallwork	13:44.8	Arthur Jones	13:51.0	Bob Hughes	13:54.2
7 miles walk	Malcolm Tolley	52:32.4	John Webb	52:49.2	Bob Hughes	53:01.8
high jump	(South Africa) Eldridge Lansdell	2.007	(Greece) Ioannis Koussoulas	1.981	Gordon Miller	1.981
pole vault	Mike Bull	4.57	(Denmark) Steen Smidt-Jensen	4.49	(Scotland) Dave Stevenson	4.34
long jump	(Wales) Lynn Davies	7.94	(East Germany) Max Klauss	7.69	(France) Jack Pani	7.68
triple jump	Fred Alsop	15.67	Derek Boosey	15.32	(Greece) Michail Karagiannis	15.15
shot put	(South Africa) Dawid Booysen	17.79	Jeff Teale	16.79	Alan Carter	16.55
discus throw	Bill Tancred	51.74	John Watts	49.12	(Scotland) Mike Lindsay	48.72
hammer throw	(United States) Ed Burke	67.60	Howard Payne	60.00	Peter Seddon	58.22
javelin throw	Barry Sanderson	73.44	Dave Travis	71.74	Dick Perkins	70.92
decathlon	Peter Gabbett	6533	Stuart Scott	6321	(Switzerland) Rudolf Born	6284

== See also ==
- 1967 WAAA Championships
