= 1964 British West Indies Championships =

International sporting competition

The 1964 British West Indies Championships was the fifth edition of the track and field competition between British colony nations in the Caribbean. This marked the relaunching of the competition after a three-year break, during which the West Indies Federation had been dissolved. It was held in Kingston, Jamaica in early September. A total of 25 events were contested, fifteen by men and ten by women. The 400 metres was added to the women's programme. The number of men's events was reduced, with the 10,000 metres, half marathon, pole vault and relay races all being dropped.

Bahamian 100 metres runner Tom Robinson was the only athlete to defend his title from the 1960 championships, although multiple former champion George Kerr topped the podium in a different middle-distance event. John Mowatt completed a double in the 5000 metres and 3000 metres steeplechase. The versatile Jamaican Wellesley Clayton took both the 110 metres hurdles and long jump gold medals. Jamaica completed a sweep of the women's titles and had three double champions: Carmen Smith (100 m and 80 metres hurdles), Una Morris (200 m and 400 m) and Joan Gordon (shot put and discus throw).

All the champions are known, but data is limited for the minor medallists.

== Medal summary ==
=== Men ===
Event	Gold		Silver		Bronze	
100 metres	Tom Robinson (BAH)	10.3	Lyn Headley (JAM)	10.4	Patrick Robinson (JAM)	10.5
200 metres	George Collie (BAH)	21.5	Pablo McNeil (JAM)	21.6	Clifton Forbes (JAM)	21.6
400 metres	Rupert Hoilette (JAM)	47.2	Mal Spence (JAM)	48.2	Unknown athlete	???
800 metres	Stanley Dunwell (JAM)	1:54.2	Casper Springer (BAR)	1:54.5	Unknown athlete	???
1500 metres	George Kerr (JAM)	3:52.6	Neville Myton (JAM)	3:53.7	Unknown athlete	???
5000 metres	John Mowatt (JAM)	16:08.9	Unknown athlete	???	Unknown athlete	???
110 m hurdles	Wellesley Clayton (JAM)	15.6	Unknown athlete	???	Unknown athlete	???
400 m hurdles	Anthony Carr (JAM)	56.8	Unknown athlete	???	Unknown athlete	???
3000 metres steeplechase	John Mowatt (JAM)	9:42.2	Only one competitor			
High jump	Henry Jackson (JAM)	1.90 m	Anton Norris (BAR)	1.90 m	Unknown athlete	??? m
Long jump	Wellesley Clayton (JAM)	7.47 m	Victor Brooks (JAM)	7.45 m	Unknown athlete	??? m
Triple jump	Victor Brooks (JAM)	14.58 m	Unknown athlete	??? m	Unknown athlete	??? m
Shot put	Carlton Spencer (JAM)	14.22 m	Unknown athlete	??? m	Unknown athlete	??? m
Discus throw	Robert Darlow (JAM)	45.59 m	Unknown athlete	??? m	Unknown athlete	??? m
Javelin throw	Hugh Malcolm (JAM)	50.33 m	Unknown athlete	??? m	Unknown athlete	??? m

=== Women ===
Event	Gold		Silver		Bronze	
100 metres	Carmen Smith (JAM)	11.8	Adlin Mair (JAM)	11.9	Unknown athlete	???
200 metres	Una Morris (JAM)	24.1	Adlin Mair (JAM)	24.5	Carmen Smith (JAM)	24.5
400 metres	Una Morris (JAM)	58.0	Unknown athlete	???	Unknown athlete	???
80 m hurdles	Carmen Smith (JAM)	11.4	Adlin Mair (JAM)	11.4	Unknown athlete	???
4×100 m relay	Jamaica (JAM)	46.5	Unknown team	???	Unknown team	???
High jump	Pauline Rodney (JAM)	1.45 m	Unknown athlete	??? m	Unknown athlete	??? m
Long jump	Beverley Welsh (JAM)	5.60 m	Unknown athlete	??? m	Unknown athlete	??? m
Shot put	Joan Gordon (JAM)	10.58 m	Unknown athlete	??? m	Unknown athlete	??? m
Discus throw	Joan Gordon (JAM)	34.77 m	Unknown athlete	??? m	Unknown athlete	??? m
Javelin throw	Jean Blake (JAM)	39.01 m	Unknown athlete	??? m	Unknown athlete	??? m
