= Rafael Santos (athlete) =

Salvadoran sprinter

Personal information
- Nationality: Salvadoran
- Born: Rafael Antonio Santos Cisneros; 13 June 1944 (age 82) Nueva Granada, El Salvador
- Height: 1.65 m (5 ft 5 in)
- Weight: 63 kg (139 lb)

Sport
- Sport: Sprinting
- Event: 100 metres
Medal record
Men's athletics
Representing El Salvador
Central American Games
Bronze medal – third place	1973 Guatemala City	Decathlon

Rafael Antonio Santos Cisneros (born 13 June 1944) is a Salvadoran sprinter and decathlete. He initially practiced sports such as basketball and football though switched to sprinting due to his short stature. After a year of training in the sport, he would become a national and Central American Champion. He would switch coaches in 1966 though returned to his old coach after he had failed to medal at the 1966 Central American and Caribbean Games.

Santos was part of the first delegation for El Salvador at the Olympic Games, where he competed in the men's 100 metres at the 1968 Summer Olympics. He would fail to medal though continued training, switching to the decathlon and competed at the 1970 Central American and Caribbean Games and 1973 Central American Games, winning a bronze medal in the latter.

Outside of sport, he would study agricultural engineering, business administration, and physical education at multiple universities. After his agricultural engineering studies, he would work at the Ministry of Agriculture agrometeorologist. At the Evangelical University of El Salvador, he was a professor. Santos then became a sports coach at Universidad de Especialidades Espíritu Santo and the Salvadorian Athletics Federation.

== Biography ==
Rafael Antonio Santos Cisneros was born on 13 June 1944 in Nueva Granada, El Salvador. When he was younger, he initially practiced basketball and football though left due to his short stature. He would then travel to Flor Blanca in San Salvador in 1963 and would be coached by Juan Véliz.

After a year of training, he became the national and Central American Champion. During that year he had also set a personal best in the 100 metres with a time of 10.8 seconds. He would go on and study industrial chemistry in the same year.

Santos switched coaches to Lothar Pädelt of Germany in 1966, though Santos would fail to medal at the 1966 Central American and Caribbean Games in Puerto Rico. He switched back to Véliz the following year and then would go on to compete at the 1968 Summer Olympics in Mexico City. Santos would be one of the first Olympians to represent El Salvador at the games. In the lead-up to the games, Santos stated that he had to pay USD$120 just to go to the games. They had to travel through planes owned by the Salvadoran Air Force.

He would then compete in the heats of the men's 100 metres on 13 October. He would place last in his heat with a time of 11.22 seconds and not advance further. He attributed his poor performance due to a hamstring injury that he had sustained. After the games, Santos would continue training but would not qualify for the 1972 Summer Olympics. Instead, he switched to the decathlon, competing at the 1970 Central American and Caribbean Games and 1973 Central American Games, winning a bronze medal in the latter.

After his sports career, he would study at the University of El Salvador and majored in agricultural engineering. He would also study at Universidad UTE and Universidad de Administración de Negocios to major in business administration. He would later work at the Ministry of Agriculture in 1974 as a agrometeorologist and completed three postgraduate degrees. Santos would also study at the Evangelical University of El Salvador to complete a degree in physical education; he would go on to become a professor there. He also became a sports coach at Universidad de Especialidades Espíritu Santo and the Salvadorian Athletics Federation. An auditorium at the office of the federation would be named after him in 2016.

== International competitions ==
Year	Competition	Venue	Position	Event	Notes
Representing El Salvador
1966	Central American and Caribbean Games	San Juan, Puerto Rico	23rd (h)	100 m	11.3
1966	Central American and Caribbean Games	San Juan, Puerto Rico	30th (h)	200 m	24.0
1968	Olympic Games	Mexico City, Mexico	64th (h)	100 m	11.22
1970	Central American and Caribbean Games	Panama City, Panama	13th	Decathlon	5209 pts
1973	Central American Games	Guatemala City, Guatemala	3rd	Decathlon	

== Personal bests ==
- 100 metres – 10.8 (1964)
