= Tim Barrett (triple jumper) =

Bahamian triple jumper

Timothy Edward A. Barrett (16 March 1948 – 20 January 2023) was a Bahamian triple jumper who competed in the 1968 Summer Olympics and in the 1972 Summer Olympics. He was born in Nassau, Bahamas.

Barrett was an All-American jumper for the USC Trojans track and field team, finishing 3rd in the triple jump at the 1968 NCAA University Division outdoor track and field championships.

== International competitions ==
Year	Competition	Venue	Position	Event	Notes
Representing the Bahamas
1966	Central American and Caribbean Games	San Juan, Puerto Rico	11th	Long jump	6.79 m
1966	Central American and Caribbean Games	San Juan, Puerto Rico	1st	Triple jump	15.76 m
1966	British Empire and Commonwealth Games	Kingston, Jamaica	4th	Triple jump	15.73 m
1967	Pan American Games	Winnipeg, Canada	10th	Triple jump	14.40 m
1968	Olympic Games	Mexico City, Mexico	20th (q)	Triple jump	15.79 m
1970	Central American and Caribbean Games	Panama City, Panama	5th	Triple jump	15.32 m
1971	Central American and Caribbean Championships	Kingston, Jamaica	3rd	Triple jump	15.32 m
1971	Pan American Games	Cali, Colombia	6th	4 × 100 m relay	40.92 s
1971	Pan American Games	Cali, Colombia	5th	Triple jump	15.75 m
1972	Olympic Games	Munich, West Germany	27th (q)	Triple jump	15.51 m
