= 1971 Central American and Caribbean Championships in Athletics – Results =

These are the results of the 1971 Central American and Caribbean Championships in Athletics which took place on July 14–17, 1971 in Kingston, Jamaica.

== Men's results ==
=== 100 meters ===
Final

| Rank | Name | Nationality | Time | Notes |
|---|---|---|---|---|
| 1st place, gold medalist(s) | Don Quarrie | Jamaica | 10.2 | CR |
| 2nd place, silver medalist(s) | Lennox Miller | Jamaica | 10.2 | CR |
| 3rd place, bronze medalist(s) | Pablo Montes | Cuba | 10.4 | |
| 4 | Hermes Ramírez | Cuba | 10.5 | |
| 5 | Guillermo González | Puerto Rico | 10.5 | |
| 6 | Félix Mata | Venezuela | 10.7 | |
| 7 | Alberto Marchán | Venezuela | 10.9 | |
| 8 | Jorge Vizcarrondo | Puerto Rico | 10.9 | |

=== 200 meters ===
Heats – July 15

| Rank | Heat | Name | Nationality | Time | Notes |
|---|---|---|---|---|---|
| 1 | ? | Don Quarrie | Jamaica | 20.6 | Q |

Final – July 16

| Rank | Name | Nationality | Time | Notes |
|---|---|---|---|---|
| 1st place, gold medalist(s) | Don Quarrie | Jamaica | 20.6 | CR |
| 2nd place, silver medalist(s) | Guillermo González | Puerto Rico | 21.3 | |
| 3rd place, bronze medalist(s) | Pablo Montes | Cuba | 21.3 | |
| 4 | Carl Lawson | Jamaica | 21.3 | |
| 5 | Hermes Ramírez | Cuba | 21.5 | |
| 6 | Sammy Monsels | Suriname | 21.9 | |
| 7 | Walter Callander | Bahamas | 22.0 | |
| 8 | Rudy Reid | Trinidad and Tobago | 22.1 | |

=== 400 meters ===
Final

| Rank | Name | Nationality | Time | Notes |
|---|---|---|---|---|
| 1st place, gold medalist(s) | Alfred Daley | Jamaica | 46.6 | CR |
| 2nd place, silver medalist(s) | Melesio Piña | Mexico | 47.4 | |
| 3rd place, bronze medalist(s) | Raúl Dome | Venezuela | 47.6 | |
| 4 | Antonio Álvarez | Cuba | 47.9 | |
| 5 | Rodobaldo Díaz | Cuba | 48.0 | |
| 6 | Desmond Melville | Trinidad and Tobago | 48.7 | |

=== 800 meters ===
| Rank | Name | Nationality | Time | Notes |
|---|---|---|---|---|
| 1st place, gold medalist(s) | Byron Dyce | Jamaica | 1:49.7 | CR |
| 2nd place, silver medalist(s) | Leandro Civil | Cuba | 1:49.7 | CR |
| 3rd place, bronze medalist(s) | Lennox Stewart | Trinidad and Tobago | 1:50.0 | |
| 4 | Luis Dubouchet | Cuba | 1:50.2 | |
| 5 | Rómulo Carreño | Venezuela | 1:51.5 | |
| 6 | Héctor López | Venezuela | 1:51.9 | |
| 7 | Horace Tuitt | Trinidad and Tobago | 1:53.8 | |
| 8 | Neville Myton | Jamaica | 1:53.4 | |

=== 1500 meters ===
| Rank | Name | Nationality | Time | Notes |
|---|---|---|---|---|
| 1st place, gold medalist(s) | Byron Dyce | Jamaica | 3:46.8 | CR |
| 2nd place, silver medalist(s) | Antonio Colón | Puerto Rico | 3:47.5 | |
| 3rd place, bronze medalist(s) | Carlos Martínez | Mexico | 3:48.2 | |
| 4 | Sergio Llanusa | Cuba | 3:49.6 | |
| 5 | Rodolfo Gómez | Mexico | 3:50.0 | |
| 6 | Julio Orense | Venezuela | 3:51.5 | |
| 7 | Glenford Robinson | Jamaica | 3:57.1 | |

=== 5000 meters ===
| Rank | Name | Nationality | Time | Notes |
|---|---|---|---|---|
| 1st place, gold medalist(s) | Héctor Ortiz | Puerto Rico | 14:25.6 | CR |
| 2nd place, silver medalist(s) | Rodolfo Gómez | Mexico | 14:25.8 | |
| 3rd place, bronze medalist(s) | Lucirio Garrido | Venezuela | 14:30.0 | |
| 4 | Rigoberto Mendoza | Cuba | 14:30.6 | |
| 5 | Victoriano López | Guatemala | 14:40.5 | |
| 6 | Euclides Calzado | Cuba | 14:43.6 | |
| 7 | Ramón Bermúdez | Venezuela | 15:24.5 | |
| 8 | Deano Tracey | Jamaica | 15:54.7 | |

=== 10,000 meters ===
| Rank | Name | Nationality | Time | Notes |
|---|---|---|---|---|
| 1st place, gold medalist(s) | Valentín Robles | Mexico | 31:32.0 | CR |
| 2nd place, silver medalist(s) | Victoriano López | Guatemala | 31:41.8 | |
| 3rd place, bronze medalist(s) | Héctor Ortiz | Puerto Rico | 31:53.0 | |
| 4 | Sergio González | Mexico | ??:??.? | |
| 5 | Tito Sotillo | Venezuela | ??:??.? | |
| 6 | Euclides Calzado | Cuba | ??:??.? | |
| 7 | John Mowatt | Jamaica | ??:??.? | |
| 8 | Miguel Chaviano | Cuba | ??:??.? | |

=== Half marathon ===
| Rank | Name | Nationality | Time | Notes |
|---|---|---|---|---|
| 1st place, gold medalist(s) | Andrés Romero | Mexico | 1:10:24 | |
| 2nd place, silver medalist(s) | John Mowatt | Jamaica | 1:12:46 | |
| 3rd place, bronze medalist(s) | Lucas Lara | Cuba | 1:12:50 | |
| 4 | R. Vega | Puerto Rico | 1:13:22 | |
| 5 | Manuel Chuco | Cuba | 1:13:35 | |
| 6 | Raymond Roberts | Grenada | 1:19:03 | |
| 7 | Rodolfo Gómez | Nicaragua | 1:22:27 | |
| 8 | Renford Harry | Panama | 1:25:14 | |
| 9 | Carlos Donegas | Nicaragua | 1:27:10 | |
| 10 | Julio Quevedo | Guatemala | 1:32:08 | |
| 11 | Antonio Pineda | Panama | 1:32:50 | |

=== 110 meters hurdles ===
Final – July 16

| Rank | Name | Nationality | Time | Notes |
|---|---|---|---|---|
| 1st place, gold medalist(s) | Juan Morales | Cuba | 13.8 | CR |
| 2nd place, silver medalist(s) | Arnaldo Bristol | Puerto Rico | 13.9 | |
| 3rd place, bronze medalist(s) | Godfrey Murray | Jamaica | 13.9 | |
| 4 | Alejandro Casañas | Cuba | 14.3 | |
| 5 | Leighton Holness | Jamaica | 14.5 | |
| 6 | Oscar Marín | Venezuela | 14.6 | |
| 7 | Enrique Rendón | Venezuela | 14.6 | |
| 8 | Francisco Dumeng | Puerto Rico | 14.7 | |

=== 400 meters hurdles ===
Final

| Rank | Name | Nationality | Time | Notes |
|---|---|---|---|---|
| 1st place, gold medalist(s) | Juan García | Cuba | 52.1 | CR |
| 2nd place, silver medalist(s) | Francisco Dumeng | Puerto Rico | 52.3 | |
| 3rd place, bronze medalist(s) | Fernando Montelongo | Mexico | 52.7 | |
| 4 | Miguel Olivera | Cuba | 54.7 | |
| 5 | Orominio Santaella | Puerto Rico | 54.9 | |
| 6 | José Jacinto Hidalgo | Venezuela | 55.2 | |
| 7 | Ricardo Worrell | Panama | 55.7 | |
| 8 | Amos Millwood | Panama | 56.4 | |

=== 3000 meters steeplechase ===
| Rank | Name | Nationality | Time | Notes |
|---|---|---|---|---|
| 1st place, gold medalist(s) | Lucirio Garrido | Venezuela | 8:58.6 | CR |
| 2nd place, silver medalist(s) | Rigoberto Mendoza | Cuba | 8:58.8 | |
| 3rd place, bronze medalist(s) | José Cobo | Cuba | 9:11.6 | |
| 4 | Modesto Carrión | Puerto Rico | 9:27.9 | |
| 5 | Julio Quevedo | Guatemala | 9:32.4 | |
| 6 | Deano Tracey | Jamaica | 10:17.2 | |
| 7 | Bertram Gardener | Jamaica | 10:18.7 | |
| 8 | Rodolfo Gómez | Nicaragua | 10:38.8 | |

=== 4 x 100 meters relay ===
| Rank | Nation | Athletes | Time | Notes |
|---|---|---|---|---|
| 1st place, gold medalist(s) | Jamaica | Alfred Daley, Carl Lawson, Don Quarrie, Lennox Miller | 39.2 | CR |
| 2nd place, silver medalist(s) | Puerto Rico | Arnaldo Bristol, Jorge Vizcarrondo, Guillermo González, Santiago Antonetti | 40.7 | |
| 3rd place, bronze medalist(s) | Venezuela | Alberto Marchán, Félix Mata, Jesús Rico, Antonio González | 40.7 | |
| 4 | Trinidad and Tobago | | 41.2 | |
| 5 | Panama | | 41.2 | |
| 6 | Netherlands Antilles | | 42.4 | |
| 7 | Mexico | | 42.4 | |

=== 4 x 400 meters relay ===
| Rank | Nation | Athletes | Time | Notes |
|---|---|---|---|---|
| 1st place, gold medalist(s) | Jamaica | Leighton Priestley, Trevor Campbell, Alfred Daley, Garth Case | 3:09.0 | CR |
| 2nd place, silver medalist(s) | Cuba | Leandro Civil, Rodobaldo Díaz, Antonio Álvarez, José Triana Pérez | 3:10.1 | |
| 3rd place, bronze medalist(s) | Trinidad and Tobago | Pat Marshall, Alfred Logie, Desmond Melville, R. Brown | 3:13.3 | |

=== 10,000 meters walk ===
| Rank | Name | Nationality | Time | Notes |
|---|---|---|---|---|
| 1st place, gold medalist(s) | Lucas Lara | Cuba | 47:20.2 | CR |
| 2nd place, silver medalist(s) | Ismael Ávila | Mexico | 47:43.8 | |
| 3rd place, bronze medalist(s) | Raúl González | Mexico | 49:35.2 | |
| 4 | Carlos Vanegas | Nicaragua | 51:14.0 | |
| 5 | Byron Williams | Jamaica | 55:58.6 | |

=== High jump ===
| Rank | Name | Nationality | Result | Notes |
|---|---|---|---|---|
| 1st place, gold medalist(s) | Pedro Yequez | Venezuela | 1.98 | |
| 2nd place, silver medalist(s) | Lloyd Scott | Jamaica | 1.95 | |
| 3rd place, bronze medalist(s) | Miguel Durañona | Cuba | 1.95 | |

=== Pole vault ===
| Rank | Name | Nationality | Result | Notes |
|---|---|---|---|---|
| 1st place, gold medalist(s) | Roberto Moré | Cuba | 4.80 | CR |
| 2nd place, silver medalist(s) | Juan Laza | Cuba | 4.40 | |
| 3rd place, bronze medalist(s) | Guillermo González | Puerto Rico | 4.30 | |
| 4 | Jorge Miranda | Puerto Rico | 4.15 | |
| 5 | David Questa | Mexico | 3.90 | |
| 6 | Luis Rosi | Panama | 3.60 | |

=== Long jump ===
| Rank | Name | Nationality | Result | Notes |
|---|---|---|---|---|
| 1st place, gold medalist(s) | George Swanston | Trinidad and Tobago | 7.43 | |
| 2nd place, silver medalist(s) | Wilfredo Maisonave | Puerto Rico | 7.38 | |
| 3rd place, bronze medalist(s) | Abelardo Pacheco | Cuba | 7.19 | |
| 4 | Dwight Williams | Jamaica | 7.18 | |
| 5 | Milán Matos | Cuba | 7.18 | |
| 6 | Solomon Rowe | Guatemala | 7.14 | |

=== Triple jump ===
| Rank | Name | Nationality | Result | Notes |
|---|---|---|---|---|
| 1st place, gold medalist(s) | Pedro Pérez | Cuba | 15.94 | CR |
| 2nd place, silver medalist(s) | Juan Velázquez | Cuba | 15.42 | |
| 3rd place, bronze medalist(s) | Tim Barrett | Bahamas | 15.32 | |
| 4 | Wilfredo Maisonave | Puerto Rico | 15.15 | |
| 5 | Gerry Swan | Bermuda | 14.53 | |
| 6 | Dudley Moxley | Bahamas | 14.22 | |

=== Shot put ===
| Rank | Name | Nationality | Result | Notes |
|---|---|---|---|---|
| 1st place, gold medalist(s) | Benigno Hodelín | Cuba | 15.76 | |
| 2nd place, silver medalist(s) | Alfredo Leyva | Cuba | 15.33 | |
| 3rd place, bronze medalist(s) | Jorge Marrero | Puerto Rico | 14.96 | |
| 4 | Pedro Gómez | Mexico | 14.16 | |
| 5 | Roberto Carmona | Mexico | 13.50 | |
| 6 | Leon Brown | Jamaica | 13.40 | |

=== Discus throw ===
| Rank | Name | Nationality | Result | Notes |
|---|---|---|---|---|
| 1st place, gold medalist(s) | Bárbaro Cañizares | Cuba | 55.50 | CR |
| 2nd place, silver medalist(s) | Javier Moreno | Cuba | 54.44 | |
| 3rd place, bronze medalist(s) | Leopold Blake | Jamaica | 46.04 | |
| 4 | Ricardo Myares | Mexico | 44.46 | |
| 5 | Roberto Pérez | Puerto Rico | 43.58 | |
| 6 | Armand Mefoa | Puerto Rico | 43.22 | |
| 7 | Pedro Gómez | Mexico | 40.86 | |

=== Hammer throw ===
| Rank | Name | Nationality | Result | Notes |
|---|---|---|---|---|
| 1st place, gold medalist(s) | Víctor Suárez | Cuba | 56.54 | |
| 2nd place, silver medalist(s) | Jesús Fuentes | Cuba | 53.98 | |
| 3rd place, bronze medalist(s) | Pedro Granell | Puerto Rico | 53.54 | |
| 4 | Gustavo Morales | Nicaragua | 48.24 | |
| 5 | J. Araha | Mexico | 45.58 | |
| 5 | Francisco Argüello | Nicaragua | 45.36 | |

=== Javelin throw ===
| Rank | Name | Nationality | Result | Notes |
|---|---|---|---|---|
| 1st place, gold medalist(s) | Juan Jarvis | Cuba | 77.20 | CR |
| 2nd place, silver medalist(s) | Amado Morales | Puerto Rico | 74.38 | |
| 3rd place, bronze medalist(s) | Justo Perelló | Cuba | 71.40 | |
| 4 | William Robbins | Mexico | 68.62 | |
| 5 | Ramón Rodríguez | Venezuela | 67.03 | |
| 6 | Donald Vélez | Nicaragua | 58.88 | |

=== Decathlon ===
| Rank | Name | Nationality | Result | Notes |
|---|---|---|---|---|
| 1st place, gold medalist(s) | Orlando Pedroso | Cuba | 6779 | CR |
| 2nd place, silver medalist(s) | Jesús Mirabal | Cuba | 6692 | |
| 3rd place, bronze medalist(s) | Dunstan Campbell | Grenada | 6105 | |
| 4 | Ramón Montezuma | Venezuela | 5965 | |
| 5 | Henry Jackson | Jamaica | 5795 | |
| 6 | Fernando Román | Puerto Rico | 5099 | |

== Women's results ==
=== 100 meters ===
Final

| Rank | Name | Nationality | Time | Notes |
|---|---|---|---|---|
| 1st place, gold medalist(s) | Fulgencia Romay | Cuba | 11.6 | |
| 2nd place, silver medalist(s) | Silvia Chivás | Cuba | 11.6 | |
| 3rd place, bronze medalist(s) | Rosie Allwood | Jamaica | 11.9 | |
| 4 | Joan Porter | Trinidad and Tobago | 11.9 | |
| 5 | Lelieth Hodges | Jamaica | 12.2 | |
| 6 | Diva Bishop | Panama | 12.2 | |
| 7 | Claudette Powell | Bahamas | 12.4 | |
| 8 | Joslyn Holder | Trinidad and Tobago | 12.6 | |

=== 200 meters ===
Final

| Rank | Name | Nationality | Time | Notes |
|---|---|---|---|---|
| 1st place, gold medalist(s) | Fulgencia Romay | Cuba | 23.6 | CR |
| 2nd place, silver medalist(s) | Silvia Chivás | Cuba | 23.9 | |
| 3rd place, bronze medalist(s) | Diva Bishop | Panama | 24.1 | |
| 4 | Joan Porter | Trinidad and Tobago | 24.3 | |
| 5 | Rosie Allwood | Jamaica | 24.3 | |
| 6 | Marcia Vargas | Venezuela | 25.7 | |
| 7 | Doris Flowers | British Honduras | 26.1 | |
| 8 | Sharn Ruinveld | Netherlands Antilles | ??.? | |

=== 400 meters ===
| Rank | Name | Nationality | Time | Notes |
|---|---|---|---|---|
| 1st place, gold medalist(s) | Marilyn Neufville | Jamaica | 53.5 | CR |
| 2nd place, silver medalist(s) | Carmen Trustée | Cuba | 54.0 | |
| 3rd place, bronze medalist(s) | Yvonne Saunders | Jamaica | 54.3 | |
| 4 | Aurelia Pentón | Cuba | 54.4 | |
| 5 | Rosalia Abadía | Panama | 58.3 | |
| 6 | Juliet Henry | Virgin Islands | 1:01.8 | |

=== 800 meters ===
| Rank | Name | Nationality | Time | Notes |
|---|---|---|---|---|
| 1st place, gold medalist(s) | Carmen Trustée | Cuba | 2:14.6 | |
| 2nd place, silver medalist(s) | Aurelia Pentón | Cuba | 2:15.1 | |
| 3rd place, bronze medalist(s) | Beverly Franklin | Jamaica | 2:15.8 | |
| 4 | Rosalia Abadía | Panama | 2:16.9 | |
| 5 | Lorna Clarke | Jamaica | 2:18.4 | |
| 6 | Edith Smith | Virgin Islands | 2:24.1 | |

=== 1500 meters ===
| Rank | Name | Nationality | Time | Notes |
|---|---|---|---|---|
| 1st place, gold medalist(s) | Lucía Quiroz | Mexico | 4:34.2 | CR |
| 2nd place, silver medalist(s) | Enriqueta Nava | Mexico | 4:37.5 | |
| 3rd place, bronze medalist(s) | Melquises Fonseca | Cuba | 4:38.5 | |
| 4 | I. Simpson | Jamaica | 5:32.5 | |

=== 200 meters hurdles ===
| Rank | Name | Nationality | Time | Notes |
|---|---|---|---|---|
| 1st place, gold medalist(s) | Lourdes Jones | Cuba | 28.0 | CR |
| 2nd place, silver medalist(s) | Raquel Martínez | Cuba | 28.2 | |
| 3rd place, bronze medalist(s) | Enriqueta Basilio | Mexico | 29.0 | |
| 4 | Carol Cummings | Jamaica | 29.2 | |
| 5 | Russel Carrero | Nicaragua | 32.9 | |

=== 4 x 100 meters relay ===
| Rank | Nation | Athletes | Time | Notes |
|---|---|---|---|---|
| 1st place, gold medalist(s) | Cuba | Silvia Chivás, Marlene Elejarde, Fulgencia Romay, Carmen Valdés | 45.4 | |
| 2nd place, silver medalist(s) | Jamaica | Rosie Allwood, Debbie Byfield-White, Lelieth Hodges, Marcia Swaby | 46.0 | |
| 3rd place, bronze medalist(s) | Venezuela | Lucia Vaamonde, Adriana Marchena, Zulay Montano, Lourdes Vargas | 47.2 | |
| 4 | Trinidad and Tobago | | 47.4 | |

=== 4 x 400 meters relay ===
| Rank | Nation | Athletes | Time | Notes |
|---|---|---|---|---|
| 1st place, gold medalist(s) | Cuba | Beatriz Castillo, Marcela Chibás, Aurelia Pentón, Carmen Trustée | 3:38.6 | CR |
| 2nd place, silver medalist(s) | Jamaica | Marilyn Neufville, Yvonne Saunders-Mondesire, Ruth Simpson, Beverly Panton | 3:41.0 | |
| 3rd place, bronze medalist(s) | Trinidad and Tobago | Laura Pierre, Joan Porter, June Smith, Cheryl Dyette | 4:03.2 | |

=== High jump ===
| Rank | Name | Nationality | Result | Notes |
|---|---|---|---|---|
| 1st place, gold medalist(s) | Audrey Reid | Jamaica | 1.73 | CR |
| 2nd place, silver medalist(s) | Andrea Bruce | Jamaica | 1.70 | |
| 3rd place, bronze medalist(s) | Marima Rodríguez | Cuba | 1.67 | |
| 4 | Bernadine Lewis | Grenada | 1.61 | |
| 5 | Mary Flora Cozier | Venezuela | 1.61 | |
| 6 | Hilda Fabré | Cuba | 1.58 | |

=== Long jump ===
| Rank | Name | Nationality | Result | Notes |
|---|---|---|---|---|
| 1st place, gold medalist(s) | Marina Samuells | Cuba | 5.93 | |
| 2nd place, silver medalist(s) | Marcia Garbey | Cuba | 5.68 | |
| 3rd place, bronze medalist(s) | Yvonne Saunders | Jamaica | 5.65 | |
| 4 | Bernadine Smith | Bermuda | 5.58 | |
| 5 | Mercedes Román | Mexico | 5.36 | |
| 6 | Alma Lawrence | Jamaica | 5.14 | |

=== Shot put ===
| Rank | Name | Nationality | Result | Notes |
|---|---|---|---|---|
| 1st place, gold medalist(s) | Carmen Romero | Cuba | 14.25 | CR |
| 2nd place, silver medalist(s) | Grecia Hamilton | Cuba | 14.04 | |
| 3rd place, bronze medalist(s) | Orlanda Lynch | Suriname | 10.20 | |
| 4 | Babagene Barrett | Jamaica | 9.68 | |
| 5 | María Streber | Nicaragua | 9.89 | |

=== Discus throw ===
| Rank | Name | Nationality | Result | Notes |
|---|---|---|---|---|
| 1st place, gold medalist(s) | Carmen Romero | Cuba | 55.24 | CR |
| 2nd place, silver medalist(s) | María Cristina Betancourt | Cuba | 49.38 | |
| 3rd place, bronze medalist(s) | Orlanda Lynch | Suriname | 34.02 | |
| 4 | María Streber | Nicaragua | 33.34 | |
| 5 | Winsome Langley | Jamaica | 28.10 | |

=== Javelin throw ===
| Rank | Name | Nationality | Result | Notes |
|---|---|---|---|---|
| 1st place, gold medalist(s) | Tomasa Núñez | Cuba | 51.64 | CR |
| 2nd place, silver medalist(s) | Milagros Bayard | Cuba | 41.54 | |
| 3rd place, bronze medalist(s) | Celina Surga | Venezuela | 37.56 | |
| 4 | Ana López | Panama | 32.28 | |
| 5 | María Streber | Nicaragua | 32.06 | |
| 6 | Orlanda Lynch | Suriname | 31.32 | |

=== Pentathlon ===
| Rank | Name | Nationality | Result | Notes |
|---|---|---|---|---|
| 1st place, gold medalist(s) | Marlene Elejalde | Cuba | 4341 | CR |
| 2nd place, silver medalist(s) | Lucía Vaamonde | Venezuela | 4333 | |
| 3rd place, bronze medalist(s) | Marcia Garbey | Cuba | 4122 | |
| 4 | Bernadine Lewis | Grenada | 3562 | |
| 5 | Lourdes Russell | Nicaragua | 2563 | |
