= Athletics at the 1966 Central American and Caribbean Games – Results =

These are the results of the athletics competition at the 1966 Central American and Caribbean Games which took place between 16 and 22 June 1966, at the Estadio Municipal Hiram Bithorn in San Juan, Puerto Rico.

== Men's results ==
=== 100 metres ===
Heats – 16 June

Rank	Heat	Name	Nationality	Time	Notes
1	1	Enrique Figuerola	Cuba	10.2	Q, GR
2	1	Pablo McNeil	Jamaica	10.5	Q
3	1	Porfirio Veras	Dominican Republic	10.7	
4	1	Winston Short	Trinidad and Tobago	10.7	
5	1	Solomon Martinus	Netherlands Antilles	11.0	
1	2	Alberto Torres	Dominican Republic	10.5	Q
2	2	Cipriani Phillip	Trinidad and Tobago	10.6	Q
3	2	Roy Oliver	United States Virgin Islands	11.8	
	2	Rafael Romero	Venezuela	NT	
	2	Gilberto Ansele	Panama	DNS	
1	3	Eric Collins	Jamaica	10.6	Q
2	3	Manuel Planchart	Venezuela	10.6	Q
3	3	Jaime Uribe	Colombia	10.7	
4	3	Roy McFarlane	United States Virgin Islands	11.5	
1	4	George Collie	Bahamas	10.6	Q
2	4	Carl Edmund	Panama	10.6	Q
3	4	Rubén Díaz	Puerto Rico	10.9	
4	4	Hermes Ramírez	Cuba	10.9	
5	4	Hortensio Fucil	Venezuela	11.0	
1	5	Edwin Roberts	Trinidad and Tobago	10.4	Q
2	5	Carl Plaskett	United States Virgin Islands	10.6	Q
3	5	Manuel Montalvo	Cuba	10.9	
4	5	Raúl Mena	El Salvador	11.0	
	5	Jorge Derieux	Puerto Rico	NT	
1	6	Héctor González	Puerto Rico	10.5	Q
2	6	Sydney Dobbs	Panama	10.7	Q
3	6	Rolando Gómez	Dominican Republic	11.2	
4	6	Rafael Santos	El Salvador	11.3	
	6	Lennox Miller	Jamaica	DNF	

Semifinals – 16 June
Wind:
Heat 1: ? m/s m/s, Heat 2: +2.2 m/s

Rank	Heat	Name	Nationality	Time	Notes
1	1	Edwin Roberts	Trinidad and Tobago	10.3	Q
2	1	Carl Plaskett	United States Virgin Islands	10.4	Q
3	1	Héctor González	Puerto Rico	10.5	Q
4	1	Alberto Torres	Dominican Republic	10.6	
5	1	Carl Edmund	Panama	10.6	
6	1	Eric Collins	Jamaica	10.6	
1	2	Enrique Figuerola	Cuba	10.1	Q
2	2	Manuel Planchart	Venezuela	10.5	Q
3	2	Pablo McNeil	Jamaica	10.6	Q
4	2	Cipriani Phillip	Trinidad and Tobago	10.6	
5	2	Sydney Dobbs	Panama	10.8	
	2	George Collie	Bahamas	DNS	

Final – 17 June

Wind: +0.9 m/s

Rank	Name	Nationality	Time	Notes
1st place, gold medalist(s)	Enrique Figuerola	Cuba	10.2	=GR
2nd place, silver medalist(s)	Edwin Roberts	Trinidad and Tobago	10.3	
3rd place, bronze medalist(s)	Carl Plaskett	United States Virgin Islands	10.5	
4	Héctor González	Puerto Rico	10.6	
5	Pablo McNeil	Jamaica	10.6	
	Manuel Planchart	Venezuela	DNS	

=== 200 metres ===
Heats – 18 June

Rank	Heat	Name	Nationality	Time	Notes
1	1	Edwin Roberts	Trinidad and Tobago	21.7	Q
2	1	Carl Plaskett	United States Virgin Islands	21.8	Q
3	1	Antonio Linares	Cuba	22.3	
4	1	Alberto Torres	Dominican Republic	22.7	
5	1	Gilberto Ansele	Panama	23.2	
	1	Eric Jordan	Barbados	DNF	
1	2	Winston Short	Trinidad and Tobago	21.9	Q
2	2	Jorge Derieux	Puerto Rico	22.0	Q
3	2	Pablo McNeil	Jamaica	22.3	
4	2	Porfirio Veras	Dominican Republic	22.7	
5	2	Roy McFarlane	United States Virgin Islands	23.0	
	1	Rafael Romero	Venezuela	DNS	
1	3	Enrique Figuerola	Cuba	21.6	Q
2	3	Lloyd Bacchus	Guyana	22.3	Q
3	3	Jaime Uribe	Colombia	22.8	
4	3	Jorge Rivera	Puerto Rico	23.0	
5	3	Rolando Gómez	Dominican Republic	24.1	
6	3	Ricardo León	El Salvador	24.2	
1	4	Carl Edmund	Panama	22.0	Q
2	4	Clifton Forbes	Jamaica	22.1	Q
3	4	Enrique Montalvo	Puerto Rico	22.2	
4	4	Anthony Cadogan	Barbados	22.8	
5	4	Hortensio Fucil	Venezuela	23.2	
6	4	Gilmore Thompson	United States Virgin Islands	23.5	
1	5	Henry Noel	Trinidad and Tobago	22.0	Q
2	5	George Collie	Bahamas	22.3	Q
3	5	Pedro Grajales	Colombia	22.4	
4	5	Fermín Garibaldi	Panama	22.6	
5	5	Rafael Santos	El Salvador	24.0	
	5	Manuel Planchart	Venezuela	DNS	
1	6	Manuel Montalvo	Cuba	22.2	Q
2	6	Migdonio Palacios	Colombia	22.5	Q
3	6	Solomon Martinus	Netherlands Antilles	23.4	
4	6	Juan Morales	Guatemala	23.5	
5	6	Raúl Mena	El Salvador	23.6	
	6	Lennox Miller	Jamaica	DNS	

Semifinals – 18 June

Rank	Heat	Name	Nationality	Time	Notes
1	1	Edwin Roberts	Trinidad and Tobago	21.3	Q
2	1	Jorge Derieux	Puerto Rico	21.9	Q
3	1	George Collie	Bahamas	21.9	Q
4	1	Lloyd Bacchus	Guyana	22.5	
5	1	Manuel Montalvo	Cuba	22.6	
	1	Carl Edmund	Panama	DNS	
1	2	Enrique Figuerola	Cuba	21.6	Q
2	2	Carl Plaskett	United States Virgin Islands	21.7	Q
3	2	Clifton Forbes	Jamaica	21.7	Q
4	2	Migdonio Palacios	Colombia	23.4	
	2	Winston Short	Trinidad and Tobago	DNF	
	2	Henry Noel	Trinidad and Tobago	DQ	

Final – 19 June

Rank	Name	Nationality	Time	Notes
1st place, gold medalist(s)	Edwin Roberts	Trinidad and Tobago	20.8 (20.70?)	GR
2nd place, silver medalist(s)	Carl Plaskett	United States Virgin Islands	21.4 (21.21?)	
3rd place, bronze medalist(s)	Enrique Figuerola	Cuba	21.5 (21.24?)	
4	Jorge Derieux	Puerto Rico	21.5	
5	Clifton Forbes	Jamaica	21.5	
6	George Collie	Bahamas	22.0	

=== 400 metres ===
Heats – ? June

Rank	Heat	Name	Nationality	Time	Notes
1	1	Humberto Mijares	Venezuela	49.1	Q
2	1	Larry Kahn	Jamaica	49.5	Q
3	1	Anthony Catwell	Barbados	50.1	
4	1	José González	El Salvador	52.7	
5	1	Luis Pérez	Dominican Republic	53.6	
1	2	Edwin Skinner	Trinidad and Tobago	47.6	Q
2	2	Malcolm Spence	Jamaica	47.9	Q
3	2	Víctor Maldonado	Venezuela	48.1	
4	2	Pedro Grajales	Colombia	48.5	
	2	Henry Lamont	United States Virgin Islands	DNS	
1	3	Lloyd Bacchus	Guyana	48.2	Q
2	3	Carlos Martínez	Cuba	48.6	Q
3	3	José Luis Villalongo	Puerto Rico	49.8	
	3	George Collie	Bahamas	DNS	
1	4	Rupert Hoilette	Jamaica	47.4	Q
2	4	José Andino	Puerto Rico	47.4	Q
3	4	Migdonio Palacios	Colombia	49.7	
4	4	Ricardo Cortés	El Salvador	53.7	
	4	Kent Bernard	Trinidad and Tobago	DNF	
1	5	Juan Franceschi	Puerto Rico	47.1	Q
2	5	Ezra Burnham	Barbados	49.0	Q
3	5	Eddy Téllez	Cuba	49.7	
4	5	Keith Williams	United States Virgin Islands	49.9	
5	5	José Olivero	Dominican Republic	51.7	
1	6	Rodobaldo Díaz	Cuba	47.6	Q
2	6	José Jacinto Hidalgo	Venezuela	49.5	Q
3	6	Betram Catwell	Barbados	52.4	
4	6	Ruben Seargeant	United States Virgin Islands	55.2	
	6	Franklyn Rahming	Bahamas	DNS	

Semifinals – ? June

Rank	Heat	Name	Nationality	Time	Notes
1	1	Juan Franceschi	Puerto Rico	47.2	Q
2	1	Edwin Skinner	Trinidad and Tobago	47.4	Q
3	1	Lloyd Bacchus	Guyana	47.4	Q
4	1	José Jacinto Hidalgo	Venezuela	47.5	
5	1	Malcolm Spence	Jamaica	49.4	
6	1	Carlos Martínez	Cuba	50.0	
1	2	Rupert Hoilette	Jamaica	47.2	Q
2	2	José Andino	Puerto Rico	47.4	Q
3	2	Rodobaldo Díaz	Cuba	47.8	Q
4	2	Larry Kahn	Jamaica	49.2	
5	2	Ezra Burnham	Barbados	50.0	
6	2	Humberto Mijares	Venezuela	51.8	

Final – 20 June

Rank	Name	Nationality	Time	Notes
1st place, gold medalist(s)	Juan Franceschi	Puerto Rico	46.7 (46.77?)	GR
2nd place, silver medalist(s)	Rupert Hoilette	Jamaica	46.9 (47.03?)	
3rd place, bronze medalist(s)	Rodobaldo Díaz	Cuba	47.0 (47.10?)	
4	Edwin Skinner	Trinidad and Tobago	47.1	
5	José Andino	Puerto Rico	47.6	
6	Lloyd Bacchus	Guyana	48.0	

=== 800 metres ===
Heats – 16 June

Rank	Heat	Name	Nationality	Time	Notes
1	1	Neville Myton	Jamaica	1:53.1	Q
2	1	Julio Morales	Puerto Rico	1:55.6	Q
3	1	Leslie Mentor	Venezuela	1:55.6	Q
4	1	Eric Nesbitt	Trinidad and Tobago	1:55.6	
5	1	Hugo Burgos	Colombia	2:02.8	
6	1	Luis Betancourt	Guatemala	2:02.8	
	1	Leonard Harewood	Barbados	NT	
	1	Francisco Coipel	Cuba	NT	
1	2	George Kerr	Jamaica	1:53.0	Q
2	2	Benedict Cayenne	Trinidad and Tobago	1:53.6	Q
3	2	Keith Forde	Barbados	1:55.7	Q
4	2	José Neri	Mexico	1:56.9	
5	2	José Rivera	Puerto Rico	1:57.5	
6	2	Lázaro Valdivieso	Cuba	1:57.5	
	2	Jorge Montilla	Colombia	NT	
	2	Franklyn Rahming	Bahamas	NT	
	2	Keith Williams	United States Virgin Islands	NT	
1	3	Lennox Yearwood	Trinidad and Tobago	1:54.8	Q
2	3	William Suárez	Cuba	1:56.2	Q
3	3	Texas Francis	Jamaica	1:57.1	Q
4	3	José Antonetti	Puerto Rico	1:58.2	
5	3	Derek Cambridge	Bahamas	1:59.9	
6	3	Pedro Hinds	Barbados	2:16.1	
	3	Lloyd Bacchus	Guyana	NT	
	3	Lamont Thomas	United States Virgin Islands	NT	
	3	Guillermo Novas	Dominican Republic	NT	

Final – 17 June

Rank	Name	Nationality	Time	Notes
1st place, gold medalist(s)	Neville Myton	Jamaica	1:50.2	GR
2nd place, silver medalist(s)	Lennox Yearwood	Trinidad and Tobago	1:51.7	
3rd place, bronze medalist(s)	Benedict Cayenne	Trinidad and Tobago	1:54.3	
4	Leslie Mentor	Venezuela	1:55.1	
5	Keith Forde	Barbados	1:56.6	
6	William Suárez	Cuba	1:58.3	
	Julio Morales	Puerto Rico	NT	
	Texas Francis	Jamaica	NT	
	George Kerr	Jamaica	DNF	

=== 1500 metres ===
Heats – 20 June

Rank	Heat	Name	Nationality	Time	Notes
1	1	Orlando Martínez	Puerto Rico	3:59.5	Q
2	1	Hugo Burgos	Colombia	4:02.7	Q
3	1	Esteban Valle	Nicaragua	4:06.1	Q
4	1	Francisco Coipel	Cuba	4:16.1	Q
5	1	Julio Quevedo	Guatemala	4:21.1	
6	1	Derek Cambridge	Bahamas	4:22.4	
	1	Lennox Yearwood	Trinidad and Tobago	DNS	
	1	Neville Myton	Jamaica	DNS	
1	2	José Neri	Mexico	4:00.8	Q
2	2	Herminio Isaac	Puerto Rico	4:01.2	Q
3	2	José Briceño	Colombia	4:04.5	Q
4	2	Franklyn Rahming	Bahamas	4:13.9	Q
5	2	Texas Francis	Jamaica	4:19.4	
6	2	Pedro Hinds	Barbados	NT	
	2	William Suárez	Cuba	DQ	
	2	Benedict Cayenne	Trinidad and Tobago	DNS	
1	3	Álvaro Mejía	Colombia	3:57.4	Q
2	3	Earl Belcher	Jamaica	3:58.3	Q
3	3	Eric Nesbitt	Trinidad and Tobago	3:58.4	Q
4	3	José Miró	Puerto Rico	3:58.5	Q
5	3	Lázaro Valdivieso	Cuba	4:00.2	
6	3	Gaspar Springer	Barbados	4:10.0	
7	2	Luis Betancourt	Guatemala	NT	
8	2	Miguel Núñez	Dominican Republic	NT	

Final – 21 June

Rank	Name	Nationality	Time	Notes
1st place, gold medalist(s)	Álvaro Mejía	Colombia	3:50.3	GR
2nd place, silver medalist(s)	Orlando Martínez	Puerto Rico	3:52.4	
3rd place, bronze medalist(s)	José Neri	Mexico	3:52.4	
4	Herminio Isaac	Puerto Rico	3:58.2	
5	Earl Belcher	Jamaica	3:59.8	
6	Hugo Burgos	Colombia	4:01.1	
7	José Miró	Puerto Rico	NT	
8	Eric Nesbitt	Trinidad and Tobago	NT	
9	Esteban Valle	Nicaragua	NT	
10	José Briceño	Colombia	NT	
11	Franklyn Rahming	Bahamas	NT	
12	Francisco Coipel	Cuba	NT	

=== 5000 metres ===
18 June

Rank	Name	Nationality	Time	Notes
1st place, gold medalist(s)	Álvaro Mejía	Colombia	14:42.6	
2nd place, silver medalist(s)	José Neri	Mexico	14:56.4	
3rd place, bronze medalist(s)	Valentín Robles	Mexico	15:33.2	
4	Concepción Salinas	Mexico	15:41.4	
5	Manuel Cabrera	Colombia	15:42.6	
6	José Vallejo	Colombia	16:04.2	
7	George Kerr	Jamaica	NT	
8	Rigoberto Mendoza	Cuba	NT	
9	René Milian	Cuba	NT	
10	Manuel Mercado	Puerto Rico	NT	
11	Felix Frederick	Trinidad and Tobago	NT	
12	Arcadio Hernández	Puerto Rico	NT	
13	Esteban Valle	Nicaragua	NT	
14	Miguel Ortiz	Puerto Rico	NT	
15	Oswin Escobar	Netherlands Antilles	NT	
16	Francisco Alcalá	Cuba	NT	
17	Alfredo Vázquez	El Salvador	NT	
18	Pieter Salm	Netherlands Antilles	NT	
	Ramón Veras	Dominican Republic	DNF	
	Rolf Duwe	Venezuela	DNF	
	Vinton Powell	Jamaica	DNF	
	Gaspar Springer	Barbados	DNS	

=== 10,000 metres ===
16 June

Rank	Name	Nationality	Time	Notes
1st place, gold medalist(s)	Álvaro Mejía	Colombia	31:34.0	
2nd place, silver medalist(s)	Valentín Robles	Mexico	32:11.0	
3rd place, bronze medalist(s)	Juan Máximo Martínez	Mexico	32:13.0	
4	Pedro Cárdenas	Colombia	33:00.0	
5	Concepción Salinas	Mexico	33:32.2	
6	José Vallejo	Colombia	34:25.8	
7	Felix Frederick	Trinidad and Tobago	34:25.9	
8	José Orihuela	Puerto Rico	NT	
9	Alfredo Vázquez	El Salvador	NT	
	Abelardo Fornés	Puerto Rico	DNF	
	Pieter Salm	Netherlands Antilles	DNF	
	Oswin Escolastico	Netherlands Antilles	DNF	
	George Kerr	Jamaica	DNS	
	Antonio Capote	Cuba	DNS	
	Ricardo Suárez	Cuba	DNS	
	José González	Cuba	DNS	

=== Half marathon ===
22 June

Rank	Name	Nationality	Time	Notes
1st place, gold medalist(s)	Valentín Robles	Mexico	1:13:47	
2nd place, silver medalist(s)	Pedro Cárdenas	Colombia	1:14:24	
3rd place, bronze medalist(s)	Antonio Ibarra	Mexico	1:17:01	
4	José González	Cuba	1:17:04	
5	Antonio Capote	Cuba	1:17:08	
6	Manuel Cabrera	Colombia	1:17:35	
7	Rodolfo Méndez	Puerto Rico	1:18:31	
8	José Muñoz	Mexico	1:21:13	
9	Abelardo Fornés	Puerto Rico	NT	
10	José Orihuela	Puerto Rico	NT	
10	Ricardo Suárez	Cuba	NT	
	Felix Frederick	Trinidad and Tobago	DNS	
	Earl Belcher	Jamaica	DNS	
	José Vallejo	Colombia	DNS	
	George Kerr	Jamaica	DNS	

=== 110 metres hurdles ===
Heats – 18 June

Rank	Heat	Name	Nationality	Time	Notes
1	1	Arnaldo Bristol	Puerto Rico	14.1	Q, GR
2	1	Ray Harvey	Jamaica	14.8	Q
3	1	Irolán Echevarría	Cuba	17.2	
	1	Félix Bello	United States Virgin Islands	DNS	
1	2	Heriberto Cruz	Puerto Rico	14.7	Q
2	2	Lázaro Betancourt	Cuba	14.9	Q
3	2	Michael Murray	Jamaica	15.2	
	2	Ian Harry	Guyana	DNS	
1	3	Hernando Arrechea	Colombia	14.4	Q
2	3	Juan Morales	Cuba	14.6	Q
3	3	Lancelot Oliver	Venezuela	14.9	
4	3	Domingo Pierantoni	Puerto Rico	15.2	

Final – ? June

Rank	Name	Nationality	Time	Notes
1st place, gold medalist(s)	Hernando Arrechea	Colombia	14.2w	
2nd place, silver medalist(s)	Ray Harvey	Jamaica	14.4w	
3rd place, bronze medalist(s)	Juan Morales	Cuba	14.5w	
4	Lázaro Betancourt	Cuba	14.5w	
5	Arnaldo Bristol	Puerto Rico	NT	
	Heriberto Cruz	Puerto Rico	DNF	

=== 400 metres hurdles ===
Heats – 16 June

Rank	Heat	Name	Nationality	Time	Notes
1	1	Heriberto Cruz	Puerto Rico	54.1	Q
2	1	Arístides Pineda	Venezuela	54.7	Q
3	1	Ramón Herrera	Cuba	56.0	Q
4	1	René Derieux	Puerto Rico	57.0	
5	1	José González	El Salvador	59.7	
	1	Ian Harry	Guyana	DNS	
1	2	Víctor Maldonado	Venezuela	53.5	Q
2	2	Miguel Olivera	Cuba	53.5	Q
3	2	Víctor López	Puerto Rico	54.8	Q
4	2	Antonio Medina	Venezuela	55.8	
5	2	Jorge Cumberbatch	Cuba	55.9	
	2	Keith Williams	United States Virgin Islands	DNS	

Final – 17 June

Rank	Name	Nationality	Time	Notes
1st place, gold medalist(s)	Heriberto Cruz	Puerto Rico	52.4	
2nd place, silver medalist(s)	Víctor Maldonado	Venezuela	52.5	
3rd place, bronze medalist(s)	Arístides Pineda	Venezuela	53.5	
4	Miguel Olivera	Cuba	53.8	
5	Víctor López	Puerto Rico	55.3	
6	Ramón Herrera	Cuba	57.5	

=== 3000 metres steeplechase ===
17 June

Rank	Name	Nationality	Time	Notes
1st place, gold medalist(s)	Flavio Buendía	Mexico	9:32.6	
2nd place, silver medalist(s)	Rolf Duwe	Venezuela	9:37.8	
3rd place, bronze medalist(s)	Rigoberto Mendoza	Cuba	9:38.4	
4	Modesto Carrión	Puerto Rico	9:43.4	
5	Mario Briceño	Colombia	9:44.2	
6	René Milián	Cuba	9:57.2	
7	Julio Quevedo	Guatemala	NT	
8	Manuel Cabrera	Colombia	NT	
9	Freddy Vargas	Puerto Rico	NT	
10	Esteban Valle	Nicaragua	NT	
11	Vinton Powell	Jamaica	NT	
12	Benjamín Rodríguez	Puerto Rico	NT	
	Francisco Alcalá	Cuba	DNF	
	Earl Belcher	Jamaica	DNF	
	George Kerr	Jamaica	DNS	
	Antonio Ibarra	Mexico	DNS	
	Concepción Salinas	Mexico	DNS	

=== 4 × 100 metres relay ===
Heats – 20 June

Rank	Heat	Team	Athletes	Time	Notes
1	1	Cuba	Félix Eugellés, Juan Morales, Manuel Montalvo, Enrique Figuerola	40.3	Q
2	1	Trinidad and Tobago	Cipriani Phillips, Winston Short, Henry Noel, Edwin Roberts	41.4	Q
3	1	Colombia	Jaime Uribe, Hernando Arrechea, Migdonio Palacios, Pedro Grajales	40.4	Q
4	1	Dominican Republic	Alberto Torres, Juan Angustia, Rolando Gómez, Porfirio Veras	41.7	q
5	1	Panama		41.0	
1	2	Jamaica	Wellesley Clayton, Pablo McNeil, Ernest Headley, Michael Fray	40.5	Q
2	2	Puerto Rico	Enrique Montalvo, Héctor González, Jorge Derieux, Arnaldo Bristol	40.5	Q
	2	Venezuela		DNS	
	2	Bahamas		DNS	
	2	United States Virgin Islands		DNS	
	2	El Salvador		DNS	

Final – 21 June

Rank	Team	Athletes	Time	Notes
1st place, gold medalist(s)	Jamaica	Wellesley Clayton, Pablo McNeil, Ernest Headley, Michael Fray	40.5	
2nd place, silver medalist(s)	Trinidad and Tobago	Cipriani Phillips, Winston Short, Henry Noel, Edwin Roberts	40.6	
3rd place, bronze medalist(s)	Cuba	Félix Eugellés, Juan Morales, Manuel Montalvo, Enrique Figuerola	40.6	
4	Puerto Rico	Enrique Montalvo, Héctor González, Jorge Derieux, Arnaldo Bristol	40.8	
5	Dominican Republic	Alberto Torres, Juan Angustia, Rolando Gómez, Porfirio Veras	41.0	
6	Colombia	Jaime Uribe, Hernando Arrechea, Migdonio Palacios, Pedro Grajales	41.3	

=== 4 × 400 metres relay ===
22 June

Rank	Team	Athletes	Time	Notes
1st place, gold medalist(s)	Jamaica	Clifton Forbes, Melville Spence, Neville Myton, Rupert Hoilette	3:08.8	GR
2nd place, silver medalist(s)	Trinidad and Tobago	Ben Cayenne, Edwin Skinner, Lennox Yearwood, Edwin Roberts	3:09.4	
3rd place, bronze medalist(s)	Puerto Rico	Juan Franceschi, Rafael Vega, José Andino, Germán Guenard	3:10.3	
4	Venezuela	José Jacinto Hidalgo, Humberto Mijares, Hortensio Fucil, Víctor Maldonado	3:12.3	
5	Cuba	Antonio Linares, Eddy Téllez, Carlos Martínez, Rodobaldo Díaz	3:13.5	
6	Barbados	Anthony Cadogan, Betram Catwell, Ezra Burnham, Keith Forde	3:17.0	
	United States Virgin Islands		DNS	
	Colombia		DNS	
	Bahamas		DNS	

=== 10,000 metres walk ===
20 June

Rank	Name	Nationality	Time	Notes
1st place, gold medalist(s)	José Pedraza	Mexico	51:32.4	GR
2nd place, silver medalist(s)	Euclides Calzado	Cuba	51:43.4	
3rd place, bronze medalist(s)	David Jiménez	Cuba	52:17.8	
4	Juan López	Cuba	53:36.8	
5	Eladio Campos	Mexico	53:48.8	
6	Luis Torres	Puerto Rico	54:14.4	
7	José Pérez	Puerto Rico	NT	
8	Gregorio Angulo	Puerto Rico	NT	

=== High jump ===
21 June

Rank	Name	Nationality	Result	Notes
1st place, gold medalist(s)	Teodoro Palacios	Guatemala	2.03	GR
2nd place, silver medalist(s)	Anton Norris	Barbados	1.98	
3rd place, bronze medalist(s)	Luis Planchart	Venezuela	1.93	
4	Carlos Vázquez	Puerto Rico	1.88	
5	Víctor Vigo	Puerto Rico	1.88	
6	Fernando Maldonado	Puerto Rico	1.88	
7	Jorge Wilson	Cuba	1.83	
8	Ramón Alvero	Cuba	1.83	
9	Trevor Tennant	Jamaica	1.83	
10	Óscar Melville	Guatemala	1.78	
11	Luis Osborne	Cuba	1.73	
	Arturo Espinal	Dominican Republic	NM	

=== Pole vault ===
17 June

Rank	Name	Nationality	Result	Notes
1st place, gold medalist(s)	Rolando Cruz	Puerto Rico	4.54	
2nd place, silver medalist(s)	Rubén Cruz	Puerto Rico	4.30	
3rd place, bronze medalist(s)	Luis Quintero	Colombia	4.15	
4	Arturo Ezquerra	Mexico	4.15	
5	Jorge Negrón	Puerto Rico	4.00	
6	Héctor Thomas	Venezuela	3.85	
7	Roberto Fernández	Cuba	3.85	
8	José Restrepo	Colombia	3.85	
9	Raúl Exquerra	Mexico	3.85	
	Roberto Velázquez	Cuba	NM	

=== Long jump ===
20 June

Rank	Name	Nationality	Result	Notes
1st place, gold medalist(s)	Wellesley Clayton	Jamaica	7.64	
2nd place, silver medalist(s)	Abelardo Pacheco	Cuba	7.55	
3rd place, bronze medalist(s)	Byron Lewis	Jamaica	7.51	
4	José Hernández	Cuba	7.50	
5	Héctor Thomas	Venezuela	7.31	
6	Goldino Flores	Mexico	7.19	
7	Ramón Iriarte	Venezuela	7.06	
8	Carlos Díaz	Cuba	7.03	
9	Trevor Thomas	Jamaica	7.00	
10	Juan Muñoz	Venezuela	6.94	
11	Tim Barrett	Bahamas	6.79	
12	Brian Skinner	Trinidad and Tobago	6.73	
13	José Rondón	Puerto Rico	6.49	
14	Heriberto Feliciano	Puerto Rico	6.32	
	Samuel Cruz	Puerto Rico	NM	
	Tulio Toribio	Dominican Republic	DNS	

=== Triple jump ===
? June

Rank	Name	Nationality	Result	Notes
1st place, gold medalist(s)	Tim Barrett	Bahamas	15.76	GR
2nd place, silver medalist(s)	José Hernández	Cuba	15.72	
3rd place, bronze medalist(s)	Trevor Thomas	Jamaica	15.42	
4	Byron Lewis	Jamaica	14.97	
5	Brian Skinner	Trinidad and Tobago	14.94	
6	Víctor Serrate	Puerto Rico	14.81	
7	Jorge Toro	Puerto Rico	14.79	
8	Ricardo Camejo	Cuba	14.67	
9	Anton Norris	Barbados	14.37	
10	Rafael Baldayo	Venezuela	14.28	
11	Juan García	Cuba	14.18	
12	Víctor Lleras	Puerto Rico	14.04	
13	Cherys Fuentes	Venezuela	13.78	
14	Tulio Toribio	Dominican Republic	12.57	
	Goldino Flores	Mexico	DNS	

=== Shot put ===
22 June

Rank	Name	Nationality	Result	Notes
1st place, gold medalist(s)	Fidel Estrada	Cuba	15.36	GR
2nd place, silver medalist(s)	Roy Hollingsworth	Trinidad and Tobago	15.36	GR
3rd place, bronze medalist(s)	Benigno Hodelín	Cuba	15.34	
4	Carlos Yapur	Mexico	15.27	
5	Carlos Díaz	Cuba	15.17	
6	Ramón Rosario	Puerto Rico	15.01	
7	Tomás Vivoni	Puerto Rico	14.26	
8	Lambertus Rebel	Netherlands Antilles	13.87	
9	Rafael García	Puerto Rico	13.81	
10	Dagoberto González	Colombia	13.58	
11	William Hall	Jamaica	13.57	
12	Joseph Gittens	Barbados	13.25	
13	Bruno Trocolis	Venezuela	13.14	
13	Néstor Villegas	Colombia	12.53	
14	Raúl Contreras	Dominican Republic	12.45	
15	John Stollard	United States Virgin Islands	11.22	
	Héctor Thomas	Venezuela	DNS	
	Roberto Carmona	Mexico	DNS	

=== Discus throw ===
17 June

Rank	Name	Nationality	Result	Notes
1st place, gold medalist(s)	Roy Hollingsworth	Trinidad and Tobago	52.10	GR
2nd place, silver medalist(s)	Javier Moreno	Cuba	48.71	
3rd place, bronze medalist(s)	Dagoberto González	Colombia	48.16	
4	Bárbaro Cañizares	Cuba	47.92	
5	Ignacio Reinosa	Puerto Rico	46.48	
6	Omar Fierro	Mexico	45.44	
7	Lambertus Rebel	Netherlands Antilles	44.40	
8	Ramiro Lescay	Cuba	41.98	
9	Eddie Rivera	Puerto Rico	41.38	
10	Carlos Rivera	Puerto Rico	38.79	
11	Joseph Gittens	Barbados	33.42	
12	John Stollard	United States Virgin Islands	32.85	
	Bruno Trocolis	Venezuela	DNS	
	Tim Barrett	Bahamas	DNS	

=== Hammer throw ===
19 June

Rank	Name	Nationality	Result	Notes
1st place, gold medalist(s)	Enrique Samuells	Cuba	68.11	GR
2nd place, silver medalist(s)	Adolfo Martín	Cuba	56.59	
3rd place, bronze medalist(s)	Marcelino Borrero	Colombia	52.38	
4	Víctor Suárez	Cuba	50.45	
5	José Núñez	Mexico	48.43	
6	José Castro	Puerto Rico	46.58	
7	Francisco Fragoso	Mexico	45.83	
8	Luis Vélez	Puerto Rico	44.60	
9	Gustavo Morales	Nicaragua	44.21	
10	José Bonilla	Puerto Rico	43.78	
11	Roy Hollingsworth	Trinidad and Tobago	34.95	
	Lambertus Rebel	Netherlands Antilles	DNS	

=== Javelin throw ===
16 June – old model

Rank	Name	Nationality	Result	Notes
1st place, gold medalist(s)	Justo Perelló	Cuba	74.74	GR
2nd place, silver medalist(s)	Francisco Mena	Cuba	69.57	
3rd place, bronze medalist(s)	Jesús Rodríguez	Venezuela	68.59	
4	Jorge García	Puerto Rico	67.23	
5	Sergio Hernández	Mexico	66.92	
6	Edmundo Medina	Mexico	63.76	
7	Aurelio Janet	Cuba	61.78	
8	Emilio Navarro	Puerto Rico	60.85	
9	Valemar Hill	United States Virgin Islands	58.48	
10	Wallace Oliveras	Puerto Rico	57.84	
11	Héctor Thomas	Venezuela	56.90	
12	John Stollard	United States Virgin Islands	35.62	
	Ramón Rodríguez	Venezuela	NM	

=== Pentathlon ===
22 June – 1962 tables

The highest mark recorded in each event is highlighted in yellow

Rank	Athlete	Nationality	LJ	JT	200m	DT	1500m	Points	Notes
1st place, gold medalist(s)	Jorge García	Puerto Rico	6.64	65.70	22.7	35.62	4:32.5	3513	GR
2nd place, silver medalist(s)	Francisco Mena	Cuba	6.63	66.11	22.4	39.07	4:57.3	3467	
3rd place, bronze medalist(s)	Ramón Iriarte	Venezuela	7.05	58.40	22.8	37.10	4:55.6	3389	
4	Roberto Caravaca	Venezuela	6.81	56.44	24.1	33.92	4:31.5	3271	
5	Néstor Villegas	Colombia	6.35	52.08	23.0	41.40	4:48.7	3266	
6	José Girón	Cuba	6.82	52.70	23.2	38.01	5:06.9	3188	
7	Roberto Carmona	Mexico	6.42	51.63	24.0	36.60	4:32.7	3184	
8	Goldino Flores	Mexico	7.04	48.54	23.2	33.10	4:53.8	3147	
9	Dagoberto González	Colombia	5.56	54.35	23.8	48.35	4:57.3	3122	
10	Sergio Hernández	Mexico	6.01	65.36	24.6	41.34	5:18.5	3122	
11	Gil Cordovés	Cuba	6.00	63.63	23.9	29.83	4:46.7	3122	
12	Heriberto Feliciano	Puerto Rico	6.43	50.72	23.0	29.70	4:56.1	2977	
13	Juan Osuna	Puerto Rico	6.22	44.54	24.1	27.93	4:30.9	2854	
14	Henry Lamont	United States Virgin Islands	5.76	47.85	23.5	24.00	4:32.4	2749	
15	Luis Cortés	Dominican Republic	5.96	43.89	25.8	34.18	5:11.6	2547	
16	Hernando Williams	United States Virgin Islands	5.90	34.28	25.1	21.62	5:37.6	2025	

== Women's results ==
=== 100 metres ===
Heats – ? June

Rank	Heat	Name	Nationality	Time	Notes
1	1	Miguelina Cobián	Cuba	11.8	Q, GR
2	1	Sandra Sealy	Panama	12.1	Q
3	1	Marigold George	United States Virgin Islands	13.1	Q
4	1	Judith Pérez	Puerto Rico	13.2	
5	1	Brenda Barzey	Trinidad and Tobago	13.3	
1	2	Adlin Mair	Jamaica	11.6	Q, GR
2	2	Cristina Hechevarría	Cuba	11.8	Q
3	2	Freida Nicholls	Barbados	12.5	Q
4	2	Christina Bartley	United States Virgin Islands	13.3	
	2	Georgina Conton	Dominican Republic	DNS	
1	3	Vilma Charlton	Jamaica	11.9	Q
2	3	Gisela Vidal	Venezuela	12.3	Q
3	3	Lucy Méndez	Puerto Rico	12.7	Q
4	3	Carmen Montaño	Dominican Republic	13.1	
5	3	Irma Rivera	El Salvador	14.4	
1	4	Carmen Smith	Jamaica	11.7	Q
2	4	Fulgencia Romay	Cuba	11.8	Q
3	4	Esperanza Girón	Mexico	12.0	Q
4	4	Zeneida de la Cruz	Dominican Republic	12.7	
5	4	Dora Petty	United States Virgin Islands	12.9	
6	4	Aida Dávila	Puerto Rico	13.3	

Semifinals – ? June

Rank	Heat	Name	Nationality	Time	Notes
1	1	Miguelina Cobián	Cuba	11.6	Q, =GR
2	1	Adlin Mair	Jamaica	11.7	Q
3	1	Fulgencia Romay	Cuba	11.9	Q
4	1	Esperanza Girón	Mexico	12.5	
5	1	Gisela Vidal	Venezuela	12.6	
6	1	Lucy Méndez	Puerto Rico	12.7	
1	2	Cristina Hechevarría	Cuba	11.6	Q, =GR
2	2	Carmen Smith	Jamaica	11.8	Q
3	2	Vilma Charlton	Jamaica	11.9	Q
4	2	Sandra Sealy	Panama	12.3	
5	2	Freida Nicholls	Barbados	12.4	
6	2	Marigold George	United States Virgin Islands	13.1	

Final – 18 June

Rank	Name	Nationality	Time	Notes
1st place, gold medalist(s)	Miguelina Cobián	Cuba	11.7 (11.69?)	
2nd place, silver medalist(s)	Cristina Hechevarría	Cuba	11.9 (11.79?)	
3rd place, bronze medalist(s)	Carmen Smith	Jamaica	11.9 (11.86?)	
4	Fulgencia Romay	Cuba	12.0	
5	Vilma Charlton	Jamaica	12.2	
	Adlin Mair	Jamaica	DNS	

=== 200 metres ===
Heats – 20 June

Rank	Heat	Name	Nationality	Time	Notes
1	1	Esperanza Girón	Mexico	25.0	Q, GR
2	1	Aurelia Pentón	Cuba	25.4	Q
3	1	Dora Petty	United States Virgin Islands	26.9	
4	1	Arlene Babb	Barbados	27.8	
	1	Zeneida de la Cruz	Dominican Republic	DNF	
	1	Sandra Sealy	Panama	DNS	
	1	Adlin Mair	Jamaica	DNS	
1	2	Una Morris	Jamaica	23.9	Q, GR
2	2	Fulgencia Romay	Cuba	24.3	Q
3	2	Gisela Vidal	Venezuela	25.8	
	2	Judith Pérez	Puerto Rico	DNF	
	2	Marigold George	United States Virgin Islands	DNS	
	2	Clover Arthur	Barbados	DNS	
1	3	Miguelina Cobián	Cuba	24.4	Q
2	3	Vilma Charlton	Jamaica	24.6	Q
3	3	Lucy Méndez	Puerto Rico	26.8	
4	3	Christina Bartley	United States Virgin Islands	27.0	
5	3	Aledene Holder	Barbados	27.5	
6	3	Georgina Conton	Dominican Republic	27.7	

Final – 20 June

Rank	Name	Nationality	Time	Notes
1st place, gold medalist(s)	Una Morris	Jamaica	24.2	GR
2nd place, silver medalist(s)	Miguelina Cobián	Cuba	24.8	
3rd place, bronze medalist(s)	Vilma Charlton	Jamaica	24.9	
4	Fulgencia Romay	Cuba	25.2	
5	Esperanza Girón	Mexico	26.0	
6	Aurelia Pentón	Cuba	26.0	

=== 80 metres hurdles ===
Heats – 20 June

Rank	Heat	Name	Nationality	Time	Notes
1	1	Carmen Smith	Jamaica	11.2	Q
2	1	Daisy Hechevarría	Cuba	11.7	Q
3	1	Mercedes Román	Mexico	12.1	Q
4	1	Nilda Nevárez	Puerto Rico	12.5	
	1	Adlin Mair	Jamaica	DNS	
	1	Christina Bartley	United States Virgin Islands	DNS	
1	2	Marlene Elejarde	Cuba	11.7	Q
2	2	Doreldeen Pagan	Jamaica	11.7	Q
3	2	Gisela Vidal	Venezuela	11.9	Q
4	2	Brenda Barzey	Trinidad and Tobago	12.1	
5	2	Irene Martínez	Cuba	12.5	
	1	Carmen Rojas	Puerto Rico	NT	

Final – 21 June

Rank	Name	Nationality	Time	Notes
1st place, gold medalist(s)	Carmen Smith	Jamaica	11.1	
2nd place, silver medalist(s)	Doreldeen Pagan	Jamaica	11.6	
3rd place, bronze medalist(s)	Daisy Hechevarría	Cuba	11.6	
4	Marlene Elejarde	Cuba	11.7	
5	Gisela Vidal	Venezuela	11.8	
6	Mercedes Román	Mexico	12.1	

=== 4 × 100 metres relay ===
22 June

Rank	Team	Athletes	Time	Notes
1st place, gold medalist(s)	Jamaica	Adlin Mair, Una Morris, Vilma Charlton, Carmen Smith	46.2	GR
2nd place, silver medalist(s)	Cuba	Irene Martínez, Cristina Hechevarría, Fulgencia Romay, Miguelina Cobián	46.5	
3rd place, bronze medalist(s)	Barbados	Aledene Holder, Freida Nicholls, Arlene Babb, Patsy Callender	49.5	
4	Puerto Rico	Lucy Méndez, Milagros Devoux, Nilda Catala, Aida Dávila	50.7	
5	Dominican Republic	Zeneida de la Cruz, Carmen Montaño, Marcia Smith, Georgina Coton	51.4	
	United States Virgin Islands		DQ	

=== High jump ===
17 June

Rank	Name	Nationality	Result	Notes
1st place, gold medalist(s)	Patsy Callender	Barbados	1.65	GR
2nd place, silver medalist(s)	Hilda Fabré	Cuba	1.60	
3rd place, bronze medalist(s)	Julia Pérez	Cuba	1.55	
4	June Greaves	Barbados	1.495	
5	Irene Ruiz	Cuba	1.445	
6	Nilda Nevárez	Puerto Rico	1.40	
7	Carmen Clemente	Puerto Rico	1.40	
8	Isabel Morales	Puerto Rico	1.345	
9	María Figueroa	Guatemala	1.345	
10	Brenda Adams	United States Virgin Islands	1.24	
	Mercedes Román	Mexico	NM	
	Clover Arthur	Barbados	DNS	
	Azalia Krigger	United States Virgin Islands	DNS	
	Gisela Vidal	Venezuela	DNS	

=== Long jump ===
16 June

Rank	Name	Nationality	Result	Notes
1st place, gold medalist(s)	Irene Martínez	Cuba	5.87	GR
2nd place, silver medalist(s)	Beverley Welsh	Jamaica	5.72	
3rd place, bronze medalist(s)	Marcia Garbey	Cuba	5.47	
4	Carmen Smith	Jamaica	5.42	
5	Gisela Vidal	Venezuela	5.36	
6	Mercedes Román	Mexico	5.28	
7	Marina Samuel	Cuba	5.23	
8	Patsy Callender	Barbados	5.21	
9	Cynthia Hyman	Jamaica	4.99	
10	Milagros Devoux	Puerto Rico	4.94	
11	June Greaves	Barbados	4.73	
12	Marina González	Puerto Rico	4.60	
13	Brenda Barzey	Trinidad and Tobago	4.49	
14	Irma Rivera	El Salvador	4.39	
15	Gerda Nathaniel	United States Virgin Islands	4.24	

=== Shot put ===
21 June

Rank	Name	Nationality	Result	Notes
1st place, gold medalist(s)	Hilda Ramírez	Cuba	12.72	GR
2nd place, silver medalist(s)	Guadalupe Lartigue	Mexico	12.23	
3rd place, bronze medalist(s)	Francisca Roberts	Venezuela	12.02	
4	Joan Gordon	Jamaica	11.93	
5	Grecia Hamilton	Cuba	11.59	
6	Onicia Álvarez	Cuba	11.33	
7	Isolina Vergara	Colombia	10.63	
8	María Suquievide	Mexico	10.51	
9	Eileen Sutherland	Jamaica	9.95	
10	Patricia Andrus	Venezuela	9.94	
11	Alicia Cruz	Puerto Rico	9.86	
12	Lilian Santos	Puerto Rico	8.86	
13	Alicia Johnson	United States Virgin Islands	8.81	
14	Noemí Cotto	Puerto Rico	8.71	
15	Alicia Sadler	United States Virgin Islands	7.69	

=== Discus throw ===
20 June

Rank	Name	Nationality	Result	Notes
1st place, gold medalist(s)	Caridad Agüero	Cuba	43.37	
2nd place, silver medalist(s)	Joan Gordon	Jamaica	39.84	
3rd place, bronze medalist(s)	Carmen Romero	Cuba	39.07	
4	Isolina Vergara	Colombia	38.72	
5	Zoraida Salas	Cuba	35.86	
6	María Suquievide	Mexico	35.72	
7	Francisca Roberts	Venezuela	35.33	
8	Guadalupe Lartigue	Mexico	34.97	
9	Patricia Andrus	Venezuela	33.42	
10	Juana Raspaldo	Puerto Rico	30.39	
11	Noemí Cotto	Puerto Rico	29.53	
12	Gladys Martínez	Puerto Rico	28.32	
13	Maritza Mojica	Dominican Republic	25.13	
14	Gloria Trotman	United States Virgin Islands	24.75	
15	Alicia Johnson	United States Virgin Islands	20.95	

=== Javelin throw ===
18 June – Old model

Rank	Name	Nationality	Result	Notes
1st place, gold medalist(s)	Hilda Ramírez	Cuba	39.34	
2nd place, silver medalist(s)	Blanca Umaña	Colombia	37.39	
3rd place, bronze medalist(s)	María Moreno	Cuba	36.47	
4	Milagros Bayard	Cuba	34.44	
5	Eileen Sutherland	Jamaica	34.13	
6	Patricia Andrus	Venezuela	33.08	
7	Gloria Trotman	United States Virgin Islands	29.82	
8	Juana Pascual	Dominican Republic	28.02	
9	María Figueroa	Guatemala	26.90	
10	Lydia Mayol	Puerto Rico	26.61	
	Marigold George	United States Virgin Islands	DNS	
