= Carl Plaskett =

American sprinter

Personal information
- Nationality: American Virgin Islander
- Born: September 23, 1943 (age 83)

Sport
- Sport: Sprinting
- Event: 100 metres

Carl Plaskett (born September 23, 1943) is a sprinter who represents the United States Virgin Islands. He competed in the men's 200 metres at the 1968 Summer Olympics.

== International competitions ==
Year	Competition	Venue	Position	Event	Notes
Representing the United States Virgin Islands
1966	Central American and Caribbean Games	San Juan, Puerto Rico	3rd	100 m	10.5
1966	Central American and Caribbean Games	San Juan, Puerto Rico	2nd	200 m	21.21
1967	Pan American Games	Winnipeg, Canada	14th (sf)	100 m	10.71
1968	Olympic Games	Mexico City, Mexico	32nd (h)	200 m	21.29
1970	Central American and Caribbean Games	Panama City, Panama	7th	100 m	10.7
1970	Central American and Caribbean Games	Panama City, Panama	11th (sf)	200 m	21.7

== Personal bests ==
- 100 metres – 10.57 (San Juan 1966)
- 200 metres – 21.29 A (+1.0 m/s, Mexico City 1968)
- 200 metres – 20.7h (NWI, St. Thomas 1966)
