= John Watts (athlete) =

British discus thrower

Personal information
- Nationality: British (English)
- Born: 23 April 1939 (age 87)
- Height: 185 cm (6 ft 1 in)
- Weight: 110 kg (243 lb)

Sport
- Sport: Athletics
- Event: Discus throw
- Club: Blackheath Harriers

John Thomas Watts (born 23 April 1939) is a British former athlete who competed at the 1972 Summer Olympics.

== Biography ==
Watts began his athletics career with Holbeach AC but after joining the Royal Navy switched to Blackheath Harriers. Watts finished second behind Bill Tancred in the discus throw event at the 1967 AAA Championships and then followed this up with two third place finishes behind Tancred at both the 1968 AAA Championships and 1970 AAA Championships.

Watts finally became the British discus throw champion at the 1971 AAA Championships by virtue of being the highest placed British athlete behind New Zealander Les Mills.

Despite another second place finish behind his nemesis Bill Tancred at the 1972 AAA Championships he represented Great Britain at the 1972 Olympics Games in Munich finishing 24th in the men's discus throw.

Watts became a Masters athlete, winning the 2018 World Masters Athletics Championships.
