= Athletics at the 1966 British Empire and Commonwealth Games – Men's high jump =

Men's high jump at the 1966 British Empire and Commonwealth Games
- Venue: Independence Park, Kingston
- Dates: August 6, 1966

Medalists
gold medal	Lawrie Peckham	Australia
silver medal	Samuel Igun	Nigeria
bronze medal	Anton Norris	Barbados

The men's high jump event at the 1966 British Empire and Commonwealth Games was held on 6 August at the Independence Park in Kingston, Jamaica.

== Results ==
Results
Rank	Name	Nationality	Result	Notes
1st place, gold medalist(s)	Lawrie Peckham	Australia	6 ft 10 in (2.08 m)	
2nd place, silver medalist(s)	Samuel Igun	Nigeria	6 ft 8 in (2.03 m)	
3rd place, bronze medalist(s)	Anton Norris	Barbados	6 ft 7 in (2.00 m)	
4	Crawford Fairbrother	Scotland	6 ft 6 in (1.98 m)	
5	Fela Sobande	Nigeria	6 ft 5 in (1.95 m)	
6	Trevor Tennant	Jamaica	6 ft 4 in (1.93 m)	
7	Bhim Singh	India	6 ft 2 in (1.88 m)	
8	Ivor Bird	Antigua and Barbuda	6 ft 0 in (1.83 m)	
8	Patrick Rahming	Bahamas	6 ft 0 in (1.83 m)	
