= Ross MacKenzie (sprinter) =

Canadian sprinter

Personal information
- Nationality: Canadian
- Born: 18 July 1946
- Died: 20 June 2002 (aged 55)

Sport
- Sport: Sprinting
- Event: 400 metres

Ross MacKenzie (18 July 1946 – 20 June 2002) was a Canadian sprinter. He competed in the men's 400 metres at the 1968 Summer Olympics. He finished second in the 1967 Pan American Games 4 × 400 metres relay (with Brian MacLaren, Bill Crothers, and Robert McLaren). MacKenzie also finished fifth in the 1967 Pan American Games 400 metres. He won a silver medal in the 1966 British Empire and Commonwealth Games 4 x 440 yards relay with Don Domansky, Brian MacLaren and Bill Crothers.

MacKenzie competed for the Southern Illinois Salukis track and field team in the NCAA.
