= Victor Brooks (athlete) =

Jamaican long jumper

Personal information
- Nationality: Jamaican
- Born: 24 May 1941 (age 85)
- Height: 1.77 m (5 ft 10 in)
- Weight: 71 kg (157 lb)

Sport
- Sport: Athletics
- Event: Long jump

Victor E. Brooks (born 24 May 1941) is a Jamaican athlete. He competed in the men's long jump at the 1968 Summer Olympics.

== International competitions ==
Year	Competition	Venue	Position	Event	Notes
Representing Jamaica
1960	British West Indies Championships	Kingston, Jamaica	2nd	Long jump	7.36 m
1960	British West Indies Championships	Kingston, Jamaica	3rd	Long jump	14.18 m
1962	Central American and Caribbean Games	Kingston, Jamaica	6th	Long jump	7.02 m
1962	British Empire and Commonwealth Games	Perth, Australia	13th	Long jump	7.23 m
1964	British West Indies Championships	Kingston, Jamaica	2nd	Long jump	7.45 m
1964	British West Indies Championships	Kingston, Jamaica	1st	Triple jump	14.58 m
1966	British Empire and Commonwealth Games	Kingston, Jamaica	5th	Long jump	7.65 m
1966	British Empire and Commonwealth Games	Kingston, Jamaica	8th	Triple jump	15.06 m
1968	Olympic Games	Mexico City, Mexico	15th	Long jump	7.51 m
1969	Central American and Caribbean Championships	Havana, Cuba	3rd	Long jump	7.31 m

== Personal bests ==
- Long jump – 7.72 metres (1968)
