= Brian MacLaren =

Canadian sprinter

Personal information
- Born: 21 December 1943 (age 81) Winnipeg, Manitoba, Canada

Sport
- Sport: Sprinting
- Event: 400 metres

Brian MacLaren (born 21 December 1943) is a Canadian sprinter. He competed in the men's 400 metres at the 1972 Summer Olympics. He finished second in the 1967 Pan American Games 4 × 400 metres relay (with Bill Crothers, Ross MacKenzie, and Robert McLaren) and third in the 1967 Pan American Games 800 metres. He won a silver medal in the 1966 British Empire and Commonwealth Games 4 x 440 yards relay with Don Domansky, Ross MacKenzie and Bill Crothers.

In 1989, MacLaren was inducted into the Manitoba Sports Hall of Fame.
