= John Adey =

English sprinter (born 1943)

Personal information
- Nationality: British (English)
- Born: 21 October 1943 (age 82) Brentford, England

Sport
- Sport: Athletics
- Event: 400m
- Club: Finchley Harriers
Medal record
Athletics
Representing England
British Empire & Commonwealth Games
Bronze medal – third place	1966 Kingston	4 x 440y relay

John Austin Adey (born 21 October 1943), is a male former athlete who competed for England.

== Biography ==
Adey finished second behind Mike Larrabee in the 440 yards event at the 1965 AAA Championships and third behind Wendell Mottley at the 1966 AAA Championships.

He represented England and won a bronze medal in the 4 x 440y relay, at the 1966 British Empire and Commonwealth Games in Kingston, Jamaica.
