= Arthur Jones (race walker) =

British racewalker

Personal information
- Nationality: British (English)
- Born: 5 October 1938 London, England
- Died: 11 November 2023 (aged 85) Australia
- Height: 186 cm (6 ft 1 in)
- Weight: 66 kg (146 lb)

Sport
- Sport: Athletics
- Event: Racewalking
- Club: Herne Hill Harriers; Brighton & Hove AC

Arthur John Jones (5 October 1938 – 11 November 2023) was a British racewalker who ceompeted at the 1968 Summer Olympics.

== Biography ==
Jones began his athletics career with Herne Hill Harriers and continued with them when he was in the Royal Air Force. After leaving the RAF he joined Brighton & Hove AC.

In 1967 he was selected for Great Britain against France and the United States in Paris and finished second behind Ron Wallwork in the 2 miles walk event at the 1967 AAA Championships. He became the British 2 miles walk champion after winning the British AAA Championships title at the 1968 AAA Championships.

Later that year at the 1968 Olympic Games in Mexico City, he represented Great Britain in the men's 20 kilometres walk.

In 1969 Jones and his wife Carol emigrated to Sydney, Australia and won the NSW 10km title. In 1975 they moved to Adelaide where he joined United Collegians. Later Jones became the President of the SA Race Walkers Club.
