= Johnson Amoah =

Ghanaian triple jumper

Personal information
- Nationality: Ghanaian
- Born: 15 August 1940 (age 85) Nkoranza, Gold Coast

Sport
- Sport: Athletics
- Event: Triple jump

Johnson O. Amoah (born 15 August 1940) is a Ghanaian athlete. He competed in the men's triple jump at the 1968 Summer Olympics and the 1972 Summer Olympics.
