= Tim Graham (athlete) =

British sprinter (born 1939)

Personal information
- Nationality: British (English)
- Born: 31 May 1939 in Madras, India
- Height: 178 cm (5 ft 10 in)
- Weight: 65 kg (143 lb)

Sport
- Sport: Athletics
- Event: 400m
- Club: Polytechnic Harriers
Medal record
Men's Athletics
Representing Great Britain
Olympic Games
Silver medal – second place	1964 Tokyo	4x400 metre relay
Representing England
British Empire & Commonwealth Games
Bronze medal – third place	1966 Kingston	4 x 440y relay

Timothy Joseph Michael Graham (born 31 May 1939) is a British former track and field athlete who competed mainly in the 400 metres and participated at the 1964 Summer Olympics.

== Biography ==
Graham finished third behind Robbie Brightwell in the 440 yards event at the 1964 AAA Championships.

Later that year at the 1964 Olympic Games in Tokyo, he represented Great Britain in the 4 x 400 metre relay, where he won the silver medal with his teammates Adrian Metcalfe, John Cooper and Robbie Brightwell.

He finished second behind Wendell Mottley at the 1964 AAA Championships but by virtue of being the highest placed British athlete was considered the British 440 yards champion. Later that year he represented England and won a bronze medal in the 4 x 440 yards relay, at the 1966 British Empire and Commonwealth Games in Kingston, Jamaica.

Graham won the AAA title outright at the 1967 AAA Championships.

He later taught art at Dr Morgan's Grammar School for Boys in Bridgwater Somerset, at King Edward VI School, Southampton, and at Ludlow Grammar School in Shropshire.
