= Martin Winbolt-Lewis =

British sprinter (born 1946)

Personal information
- Nationality: British (English)
- Born: 14 November 1946 (age 79) Haslemere, England
- Height: 185 cm (6 ft 1 in)
- Weight: 73 kg (161 lb)

Sport
- Sport: Athletics
- Event: Sprinting/400 metres
- Club: Cambridge University AC; Achilles Club; London AC
Medal record
Athletics
Representing England
British Empire & Commonwealth Games
Bronze medal – third place	1966 Kingston	4 x 440y relay
Representing Great Britain
Summer Universiade
Silver medal – second place	1970 Turin	800m

Martin John Winbolt-Lewis (born 14 November 1946) is a British former sprinter who competed at the 1968 Summer Olympics.

== Biography ==
Winbolt-Lewis studied at Fitzwilliam College, Cambridge.

Winbolt-Lewis represented England and won a bronze medal in the 4 x 440 yards relay, at the 1966 British Empire and Commonwealth Games in Kingston, Jamaica.

Winbolt-Lewis became the British 440 yards champion after winning the British AAA Championships title at the 1968 AAA Championships.

Later that year at the 1968 Olympic Games in Mexico City, he represented Great Britain in the men's 400 metres.

Two years later he represented England again and competed in the 800 metres, at the 1970 British Commonwealth Games in Edinburgh, Scotland.
