= Bill Crothers =

Canadian athlete (born 1940)

Personal information
- Born: 24 December 1940 (age 85) Markham, Ontario, Canada
- Height: 183 cm (6 ft 0 in)
- Weight: 71 kg (157 lb)

Sport
- Sport: Athletics
- Event: 400/800m
- Club: Agincourt/Markham
Medal record
Men's athletics
Representing Canada
Olympic Games
Silver medal – second place	1964 Tokyo	800 metres
Pan American Games
Silver medal – second place	1967 Winnipeg	800 metres
Silver medal – second place	1967 Winnipeg	4 x 400 metres relay
British Empire and Commonwealth Games
Silver medal – second place	1966 Kingston	4 x 440 yard relay
Universiade
Gold medal – first place	1965 Budapest	800 metres

William Frederick Crothers (born December 24, 1940) is a Canadian retired athlete who competed at two Olympic Games.

== Biography ==
Born in Markham, Crothers grew up in the Toronto suburbs of East York and Agincourt, attending high school at Agincourt Collegiate Institute before going on to study at the University of Toronto.

At one point, Crothers held the Canadian record in all distances from 400 metres to 1500 metres and was holder of the world 800 metres indoor record. In 1963, he ran the two fastest 800 metres races of the year. He was named Lou Marsh Trophy winner as Canada's top athlete of 1963.

Crothers won the British AAA Championships title in the 880 yards event at the 1964 AAA Championships.

Later that year, Crothers competed for Canada in the 1964 Summer Olympics held in Tokyo, winning a silver medal in the 800 metres. He also competed in the 400 metres, but was eliminated in the semi-finals. He received the Lionel Conacher Award as Canada's top male athlete of 1964. Crothers was ranked by Track & Field News as the top 800 metres runner of 1965 and the second best of the decade.

He has been inducted into the Canadian Olympic Hall of Fame (1965), the Canada's Sports Hall of Fame (1971), and the Ontario Sports Hall of Fame (1997).

Crothers was a pharmacist (Kiernan-Crothers Pharmacy) in the Markham area for many years, and was a trustee (and past board chair) for the York Region District School Board. Bill Crothers Secondary School, an athletic-focused secondary school in York Region opened in his honour in August 2008.
