= Wendell Mottley =

Trinidad & Tobago economist, politician and athlete (born 1941)

Honorable Wendell Mottley ORTT
Personal information
- Full name: Wendell Adrian Mottley
- Nationality: Trinidad and Tobago
- Born: 2 July 1941 (age 85) Port of Spain, Trinidad and Tobago
- Education: Queen's Royal College; Yale University; University of Cambridge
- Occupations: Economist and Politician
Medal record
Representing Trinidad and Tobago
Men's athletics
Silver medal – second place	1964 Tokyo	400 m
Bronze medal – third place	1964 Tokyo	4x400 m relay

Wendell Adrian Mottley ORTT (born 2 July 1941) is a Trinidad and Tobago economist, politician and athlete. Mottley served as Senator and member of the House of Representatives with the Trinidad and Tobago Parliament and was Minister of Finance from 1991 to 1995. He was an Ivy League sprinter, winning two Olympic medals in 1964.

== Early life and education ==
Mottley was born 2 July 1941 in Port of Spain, Trinidad and Tobago. He was the youngest of four brothers who were all runners. As a youngster, he began to run in competitions sponsored local oil companies. He attended Queen's Royal College, an elite public high school in Port of Spain. While competing in a high school track meet, the coach from Loughborough University suggested that Mottley would be of interest to his friend who coached track at Yale University.

Mottley attended Yale University, graduating in economics in 1964. While at Yale, he made the dean's list, was captain of the track team, and joined St. Anthony Hall. He was the first person of colour to join St. Anthony Hall, nationwide.

He earned a master's degree in economics from St Catharine's College at the University of Cambridge. While at Cambridge, Mottley was captain of the track team and became lifelong friends with the Oxford team's captain, later the novelist Jeffrey Archer.

== Athletics ==
Mottley was a sprinter for Yale University track team. His coach was Bob Giegengack, also the track coach for Team USA in the 1964 Summer Olympics. In addition to sprinting, Giegengack had Mottley run cross country, "which he hated".

Mottley participated in three Heptagonal Games Championships between 1962 and 1964, winning the 440y each year. In the mid-1960s, Mottley was the fastest man in Yale University and Ivy League history. He still is the record holder in the 500m/600y at Yale. Mottley also set indoor world records for the 400-yard, 500-yard, and 600-yard distances in 1964. His personal best time of 45.2 stands as the Ivy League record for the 440y/400 meter event. One writer notes, "In his time he was not only the best long sprinter in the Ivy League but also one of the best in the world." In 1964, Mottley set indoor world records for the 400-yard, 500-yard, and 600-yard distances.

At the 1964 Summer Olympics in Tokyo, Mottley won a silver medal for the 400 meters and a bronze medal for the 4 x 400 meters relay, representing Trinidad and Tobago. After the race where he won the silver medal, Mottley says Giegengack gave him a salute.

After the Olympics, Mottley ran track for Cambridge University and competed in the European circuit. He also took two gold medals at the 1966 British Empire and Commonwealth Games in Jamaica, winning in the 440 yards and the 4×440 yards relay events The relay team set the Commonwealth Games record for the 4x440y. and won the British AAA Championships title in the 440 yards event at the 1966 AAA Championships.

== Career ==
=== Politics ===
Mottley was elected as Senator to the Trinidad and Tobago 2nd Republican Parliament from 1981 to 1986, and was appointed Minister of Housing and Resettlement from 1981 to 1985. He was then appointed Minister of Industry and Commerce, serving from 1985 to 1986.

As a member of the People's National Movement, he was elected to the House of Representatives for the 4th Republican Parliament for Saint Ann's East, from 1992 to 1995. From 1992 to 1994, he was Minister of Finance. He was responsible for the flotation of the Trinidad and Tobago dollar. He also founded the Civilian Conservation Corps in Trinidad and Tobago. He was Minister of Tourism from 1994 to 1995.

In the early 2000s, Mottley was the leader of the Citizens' Alliance, a dissolved minor political party in Trinidad and Tobago. His party received 5,955 votes (1%) and captured no seats in the 2002 general election.

After Cambridge, Mottley worked in London, before returning to Trinidad and Tobago, where he developed a career in housing development. In 1996, Mottley became an investment banker at Credit Suisse in New York, serving as managing director and senior advisor over the course of fifteen years.

Mottley was a visiting fellow at the Center for Global Development, a United States–based think tank, where he contributed Trinidad and Tobago--industrial policy 1959–2008 : a Historical and Contemporary Analysis in 2008.

Later, he was chairman of the board of the Unit Trust Corporation, the Caribbean's largest mutual fund company.

He served on the board of the Pan-American Life Insurance Group from 2013 to his retirement in 2021, when he reached the board's mandatory retirement age of 80.

== Affiliations ==
Mottley served on the board of World Wildlife Fund and the Asa Wright Bird Foundation, a Caribbean environmentalist group. He is also a member of the Yale School of Forestry leadership council.

== Honours ==
On 1 November 2018, Mottley received the Order of the Republic of Trinidad and Tobago (ORTT) for his contribution to national development and public service.

Olympic Games
Preceded by	Flagbearer for Trinidad and Tobago; Tokyo 1964	Succeeded by Roger Gibbon
