= Athletics at the 1970 Central American and Caribbean Games – Results =

These are the results of the athletics competition at the 1970 Central American and Caribbean Games which took place between 1 and 8 March 1970, at the Estadio Revolución in Panama City, Panama.

== Men's results ==
=== 100 metres ===
Heats – 1 March
Wind:
Heat 1: +3.2 m/s, Heat 2: +6.5 m/s, Heat 3: ? m/s, Heat 4: ? m/s, Heat 5: 7.5 m/s

Rank	Heat	Name	Nationality	Time	Notes
1	1	Hermes Ramírez	Cuba	10.2	Q
2	1	Jimmy Sierra	Colombia	10.7	Q
1	2	Pablo Montes	Cuba	10.0	Q
2	2	Carl Edmund	Panama	10.3	Q
4	2	Enrique Montalvo	Puerto Rico	10.5	q
6	2	Wenceslao Ferrín Sr.	Colombia	10.9	
2	3	Santiago Sanjurjo	Puerto Rico	10.5	Q
1	4	Jorge Vizcarrondo	Puerto Rico	10.4	Q
1	5	Bárbaro Bandomo	Cuba	10.3	Q
2	5	Arquímides Mina	Colombia	10.3	Q

Semifinals – 1 March
Wind:
Heat 1: +7.5 m/s m/s, Heat 2: +3.5 m/s

Rank	Heat	Name	Nationality	Time	Notes
1	1	Pablo Montes	Cuba	9.93	Q
2	1	Michael Fray	Jamaica	10.24	Q
3	1	Hasely Crawford	Trinidad and Tobago	10.36	Q
4	1	Carl Plaskett	United States Virgin Islands	10.39	q
5	1	Carl Edmund	Panama	10.48	
6	1	Arquímides Mina	Colombia	10.49	
7	1	Santiago Sanjurjo	Puerto Rico	10.6	
1	2	Hermes Ramírez	Cuba	10.1	Q
2	2	Bárbaro Bandomo	Cuba	10.3	Q
3	2	Kevin Johnson	Bahamas	10.5	Q
4	2	Christopher Brathwaite	Trinidad and Tobago	10.5	
5	2	Jorge Vizcarrondo	Puerto Rico	10.5	
6	2	Enrique Montalvo	Puerto Rico	10.6	
7	2	Jimmy Sierra	Colombia	10.6	

Final – 2 March

Wind: +1.4 m/s

Rank	Lane	Name	Nationality	Time	Notes
1st place, gold medalist(s)	7	Pablo Montes	Cuba	10.24	GR
2nd place, silver medalist(s)	4	Hermes Ramírez	Cuba	10.28	
3rd place, bronze medalist(s)	5	Michael Fray	Jamaica	10.45	
4	3	Bárbaro Bandomo	Cuba	10.5	
5	6	Hasely Crawford	Trinidad and Tobago	10.6	
6	1	Kevin Johnson	Bahamas	10.6	
7	2	Carl Plaskett	United States Virgin Islands	10.7	

=== 200 metres ===
Heats – 3 March
Wind:
Heat 1: ? m/s, Heat 2: ? m/s, Heat 3: ? m/s, Heat 4: ? m/s, Heat 5: ? m/s

Rank	Heat	Name	Nationality	Time	Notes
1	1	Michael Fray	Jamaica	21.7	Q
2	1	Jorge Vizcarrondo	Puerto Rico	21.8	Q
3	1	Pedro Grajales	Colombia	21.8	q
1	2	Kevin Johnson	Bahamas	21.6	Q
4	2	Arquímides Mina	Colombia	21.9	q
3	3	Enrique Montalvo	Puerto Rico	21.9	
1	5	Pablo Montes	Cuba	21.4	Q
4	5	Jimmy Sierra	Colombia	21.9	

Semifinals – 3 March
Wind:
Heat 1: +1.6 m/s, Heat 2: 0.0 m/s

Rank	Heat	Name	Nationality	Time	Notes
1	1	Michael Fray	Jamaica	21.2	Q
2	1	Germán Solís	Cuba	21.2	Q
3	1	Kevin Johnson	Bahamas	21.5	Q
4	1	Pedro Grajales	Colombia	21.6	
5	1	Christopher Brathwaite	Trinidad and Tobago	21.7	
6	1	Carl Plaskett	United States Virgin Islands	21.7	
1	2	Pablo Montes	Cuba	20.9	Q
2	2	Hermes Ramírez	Cuba	21.2	Q
3	2	Jorge Vizcarrondo	Puerto Rico	21.3	Q
4	2	Melesio Piña	Mexico	21.4	q
5	2	Carl Edmund	Panama	21.5	
6	2	Enrique Almarante	Dominican Republic	21.8	
	2	Arquímides Mina	Colombia	DNS	

Final – 4 March

Wind: -3.0 m/s

Rank	Lane	Name	Nationality	Time	Notes
1st place, gold medalist(s)		Pablo Montes	Cuba	21.2	
2nd place, silver medalist(s)		Germán Solís	Cuba	21.3	
3rd place, bronze medalist(s)		Hermes Ramírez	Cuba	21.4	
4		Kevin Johnson	Bahamas	21.7	
5		Michael Fray	Jamaica	21.7	
6		Jorge Vizcarrondo	Puerto Rico	21.8	
		Melesio Piña	Mexico	DNS	

=== 400 metres ===
Heats – 4 March

Rank	Heat	Name	Nationality	Time	Notes
3	1	Tomás Fernández	Puerto Rico	48.4	
3	3	Pedro Grajales	Colombia	NT	Q
4	3	Raymond Garay	Puerto Rico	47.8	Q
3	5	Carlos Morell	Puerto Rico	48.1	Q

Semifinals – 4 March

Rank	Heat	Name	Nationality	Time	Notes
1	1	Clifton Forbes	Jamaica	47.0	Q
2	1	Rodobaldo Díaz	Cuba	47.1	Q
3	1	Manuel Guerra	Venezuela	47.2	Q
4	1	Francisco Sardo	Mexico	47.6	
5	1	Raúl Dome	Venezuela	47.6	
6	1	Raymond Garay	Puerto Rico	48.4	
7	1	Jacinto Tejada	Panama	49.1	
1	2	Antonio Álvarez	Cuba	46.7	Q
2	2	Melesio Piña	Mexico	47.0	Q
3	2	Pedro Grajales	Colombia	47.5	Q
4	2	Misael Curiel	Venezuela	47.5	q
5	2	Ricardo Bailey	Panama	47.6	
6	2	Alejandro Sánchez	Mexico	47.7	
7	2	Carlos Morell	Puerto Rico	48.6	

Final – 5 March

Rank	Lane	Name	Nationality	Time	Notes
1st place, gold medalist(s)		Antonio Álvarez	Cuba	46.6	
2nd place, silver medalist(s)	5	Melesio Piña	Mexico	46.9	
3rd place, bronze medalist(s)	3	Misael Curiel	Venezuela	47.1	
4	2	Rodobaldo Díaz	Cuba	47.3	
5	4	Pedro Grajales	Colombia	47.5	
6	1	Manuel Guerra	Venezuela	47.6	
7		Clifton Forbes	Jamaica	48.8	

=== 800 metres ===
Heats – 1 March

Rank	Heat	Name	Nationality	Time	Notes
1	3	Juan Calderín	Cuba	1:52.8	Q
2	3	Orlando Martínez	Puerto Rico	1:53.0	Q
3	3	Laureano Guayara	Colombia	1:53.1	Q, PB
1	4	Félix Mantilla	Colombia	1:51.8	Q
2	4	Herminio Isaac	Puerto Rico	1:52.0	Q
3	4	Donaldo Arza	Panama	1:54.7	Q, PB

Semifinals – 1 March

Rank	Heat	Name	Nationality	Time	Notes
5	1	Orlando Martínez	Puerto Rico	1:51.6	Q
2	2	Ricardo Bailey	Panama	1:52.7	Q
3	2	Juan Calderín	Cuba	1:53.6	Q
4	2	Laureano Guayara	Colombia	1:53.6	
5	2	José Neri	Mexico	1:55.1	
6	2	Miguel Núñez	Dominican Republic	1:56.1	
7	2	Richard Riley	Netherlands Antilles	2:00.2	

Final – 3 March

Rank	Name	Nationality	Time	Notes
1st place, gold medalist(s)	Herminio Isaac	Puerto Rico	1:49.8	GR
2nd place, silver medalist(s)	Ricardo Bailey	Panama	1:49.9	
3rd place, bronze medalist(s)	Donaldo Arza	Panama	1:50.3	
4	Salvador Pliego	Mexico	1:50.4	
5	Lázaro Valdivieso	Cuba	1:51.1	
6	Darío Rodríguez	Cuba	1:53.2	
7	Juan Calderín	Cuba	1:54.4	

=== 1500 metres ===
Heats – 6 March

Rank	Heat	Name	Nationality	Time	Notes
1	1	Mario Pérez	Mexico	3:57.5	Q
2	1	Félix Mantilla	Colombia	3:57.9	Q
3	1	José Cobo	Cuba	3:58.2	Q
4	1	Ricardo Palomares	Mexico	3:58.4	Q
5	1	Lázaro Valdivieso	Cuba	3:58.4	Q
6	1	José Ramírez	Guatemala	4:06.9	
7	1	Laureano Guayara	Colombia	4:07.5	
8	1	Sixto Lora	Dominican Republic	4:13.9	
9	1	Róger Murillo	Nicaragua	4:19.2	
10	1	Luis Wilson	Panama	4:26.1	
1	2	Byron Dyce	Jamaica	3:52.1	Q
2	2	Carlos Báez	Puerto Rico	3:52.2	Q
3	2	Orlando Martínez	Puerto Rico	3:53.3	Q
4	2	Neville Myton	Jamaica	3:53.6	Q
5	2	Donaldo Arza	Panama	3:54.0	Q
6	2	José Neri	Mexico	3:55.3	
7	2	Juan Cruz	Cuba	4:01.6	
8	2	Modesto Comprés	Dominican Republic	4:01.7	
9	2	Rogelio Valencia	Panama	4:05.4	
10	2	Rafael Baracaldo	Colombia	4:06.4	
11	2	Miguel Núñez	Dominican Republic	4:10.7	
12	2	Erasmo Gómez	Nicaragua	4:32.8	
	2	Richard Riley	Netherlands Antilles	DQ	

Final – 8 March

Rank	Name	Nationality	Time	Notes
1st place, gold medalist(s)	Byron Dyce	Jamaica	3:45.8	GR
2nd place, silver medalist(s)	Donaldo Arza	Panama	3:46.1	
3rd place, bronze medalist(s)	Mario Pérez	Mexico	3:47.2	
4	Carlos Báez	Puerto Rico	3:48.3	
5	Orlando Martínez	Puerto Rico	3:49.6	
6	Ricardo Palomares	Mexico	3:50.6	
7	Lázaro Valdivieso	Cuba	3:50.7	
8	José Cobo	Cuba	3:52.4	
9	Félix Mantilla	Colombia	3:52.8	
10	Neville Myton	Jamaica	3:55.8	

=== 5000 metres ===
3 March

Rank	Name	Nationality	Time	Notes
1st place, gold medalist(s)	Mario Pérez	Mexico	14:24.4	
2nd place, silver medalist(s)	Juan Máximo Martínez	Mexico	14:24.8	
3rd place, bronze medalist(s)	Pedro Miranda	Mexico	14:25.4	
4	Victoriano López	Guatemala	14:29.4	
5	Julio Quevedo	Guatemala	14:45.2	
6	Rigoberto Mendoza	Cuba	14:48.8	
7	Ronald Mercelina	Netherlands Antilles	14:49.6	
8	Víctor Mora	Colombia	14:50.2	
9	José Bordón	Cuba	15:14.6	
10	Ricardo Suárez	Cuba	15:23.2	
11	Germán Correa	Colombia	15:24.6	
12	César Ruiz	Panama	16:02.4	
13	Luis Gamboa	Costa Rica	16:04.2	
14	Agustín Lucas	Dominican Republic	16:13.2	
15	Modesto Carrión	Puerto Rico	16:20.8	
16	Carlos Cuque López	Guatemala	16:24.0	
17	Rodolfo Gómez	Nicaragua	16:45.0	
18	Roger Gómez	Nicaragua	17:16.6	

=== 10,000 metres ===
1 March

Rank	Name	Nationality	Time	Notes
1st place, gold medalist(s)	Juan Máximo Martínez	Mexico	30:49.0	GR
2nd place, silver medalist(s)	Mario Pérez	Mexico	30:51.6	
3rd place, bronze medalist(s)	Andrés Romero	Mexico	30:57.6	
4	Rafael Pérez	Costa Rica	31:03.8	
5	Victoriano López	Guatemala	31:14.8	
6	Víctor Mora	Colombia	31:18.6	
7	Julio Quevedo	Guatemala	31:18.6	
8	Patricio Larrinaga	Cuba	31:22.4	
9	Antonio Capote	Cuba	32:22.2	
10	Germán Correa	Colombia	32:34.0	
11	Manuel Pérez	Puerto Rico	32:58.2	
12	Ricardo Suárez	Cuba	33:08.0	

=== Marathon ===
8 March

Rank	Name	Nationality	Time	Notes
1st place, gold medalist(s)	Alfredo Peñaloza	Mexico	2:47:23	GR
2nd place, silver medalist(s)	Antonio Capote	Cuba	2:48:59	
3rd place, bronze medalist(s)	Patricio Larrinaga	Cuba	2:50:38	
4	Julio Quevedo	Guatemala	2:53:02	
5	Jacinto Sabinal	Mexico	2:54:22	
6	Carlos Cuque López	Guatemala	2:57:29	
7	Felipe Chaviano	Cuba	3:00:30	
8	Pablo Garrido	Mexico	3:06:03	
9	José Moreno	Panama	3:08:32	
10	Rafael Sandi	Costa Rica	3:15:52	
11	Manuel Alvarado	El Salvador	3:34:23	
12	Cristiano Cortés	Panama	3:37:48	
13	Andrés Acevedo	El Salvador	3:46:39	

=== 110 metres hurdles ===
Heats – 4 March
Wind:
Heat 1: -2.67 m/s m/s, Heat 2: -1.33 m/s, Heat 3: -1.67 m/s

Rank	Heat	Name	Nationality	Time	Notes
1	1	Juan Morales	Cuba	14.1	Q, GR
2	1	Héctor González	Puerto Rico	15.6	Q
3	1	Donald Vélez	Nicaragua	15.8	
4	1	Arturo Suman	Panama	16.8	
	1	Franklin Blyden	United States Virgin Islands	DNS	
1	2	Arnaldo Bristol	Puerto Rico	14.4	Q
2	2	Dámaso Alfonso	Cuba	14.7	Q
3	2	Jesús Villegas	Colombia	14.8	q
4	2	Alexis Rendón	Venezuela	14.8	
5	2	Richard Davis	Panama	15.3	
1	3	Guillermo Núñez	Cuba	14.6	Q
2	3	Domingo Pierantoni	Puerto Rico	15.0	Q
3	3	Gerald Donatien	Trinidad and Tobago	15.7	
4	3	Alfonso Gordon	Panama	16.4	
	3	Wenceslao Ferrín Sr.	Colombia	DNS	

Final – 5 March

Wind: -1.2 m/s

Rank	Lane	Name	Nationality	Time	Notes
1st place, gold medalist(s)		Juan Morales	Cuba	14.0	GR
2nd place, silver medalist(s)		Arnaldo Bristol	Puerto Rico	14.2	
3rd place, bronze medalist(s)		Guillermo Núñez	Cuba	14.5	
4		Dámaso Alfonso	Cuba	14.7	
5		Jesús Villegas	Colombia	14.8	
6		Domingo Pierantoni	Puerto Rico	14.9	
7		Héctor González	Puerto Rico	15.5	

=== 400 metres hurdles ===
Heats – 1 March

Rank	Heat	Name	Nationality	Time	Notes
1	1	Carlos Martínez	Cuba	53.0	Q
2	1	Iván Mangual	Puerto Rico	53.9	Q
3	1	Ricardo Worrel	Panama	54.2	
4	1	Gerald Donatien	Trinidad and Tobago	55.2	
5	1	Obed Londoño	Colombia	57.1	
1	2	Miguel Olivera	Cuba	51.9	Q
2	2	Alejandro Sánchez	Mexico	52.6	Q
3	2	Víctor López	Puerto Rico	55.4	
4	2	Óscar Rivas	Venezuela	55.6	
5	2	Julio López	Nicaragua	58.9	
1	3	Juan García	Cuba	52.7	Q
2	3	Orominio Santaella	Puerto Rico	52.9	Q
3	3	Manuel Ruiz	Mexico	53.5	q
4	3	Bernard Linley	Trinidad and Tobago	54.4	

Final – 2 March

Rank	Lane	Name	Nationality	Time	Notes
1st place, gold medalist(s)	1	Juan García	Cuba	50.6	GR
2nd place, silver medalist(s)	6	Alejandro Sánchez	Mexico	50.6	
3rd place, bronze medalist(s)	7	Miguel Olivera	Cuba	51.3	
4	4	Orominio Santaella	Puerto Rico	52.7	
5	3	Carlos Martínez	Cuba	53.1	
6	2	Manuel Ruiz	Mexico	54.8	
	5	Iván Mangual	Puerto Rico	DNF	

=== 3000 metres steeplechase ===
2 March

Rank	Name	Nationality	Time	Notes
1st place, gold medalist(s)	Héctor Villanueva	Mexico	8:53.2	GR
2nd place, silver medalist(s)	Antonio Villanueva	Mexico	8:53.4	
3rd place, bronze medalist(s)	Rigoberto Mendoza	Cuba	8:55.2	
4	Rafael Baracaldo	Colombia	9:04.8	NR
5	Pedro Miranda	Mexico	9:05.0	
6	José Cobo	Cuba	9:18.0	
7	Emilio Rodríguez	Cuba	9:18.8	
8	Víctor Mora	Colombia	9:26.4	
9	Carlos Báez	Puerto Rico	NT	
	Róger Murillo	Nicaragua	DNF	

=== 4 × 100 metres relay ===
Heats – 7 March

Rank	Heat	Team	Athletes	Time	Notes
1	1	Colombia	Arquímides Mina, Jimmy Sierra, Wenceslao Ferrín Sr., Pedro Grajales	41.0	Q
2	1	Panama	Reynaldo Allen, Alberto Bloomfield, Jacinto Tejada, Carl Edmund	41.3	Q
3	1	Dominican Republic	Alberto Torres, Enriue Almarante, Miguel Rodríguez, Porfirio Veras	42.2	Q
4	1	Trinidad and Tobago	Hasely Crawford, Christopher Brathwaite, Carl Archer, George Simon	42.5	q
1	2	Cuba	Hermes Ramírez, Pablo Montes, Juan Morales, José Triana	39.7	Q, GR
2	2	Puerto Rico	Enrique Montalvo, Víctor López, Jorge Vizcarrondo, Arnaldo Bristol	41.2	Q
3	2	Netherlands Antilles	Jorge Floranus, Urnic Wiel, Salomon Martinus, Sigfried Merced	1:13.1	Q

Final – 8 March

Rank	Team	Athletes	Time	Notes
1st place, gold medalist(s)	Cuba	Hermes Ramírez, Pablo Montes, Juan Morales, José Triana	39.4	GR
2nd place, silver medalist(s)	Colombia	Arquímides Mina, Jimmy Sierra, Wenceslao Ferrín Sr., Pedro Grajales	40.8	
3rd place, bronze medalist(s)	Puerto Rico	Enrique Montalvo, Víctor López, Jorge Vizcarrondo, Arnaldo Bristol	40.8	
4	Panama	Reynaldo Allen, Alberto Bloomfield, Jacinto Tejada, Carl Edmund	41.0	
5	Trinidad and Tobago	Hasely Crawford, Christopher Brathwaite, Carl Archer, George Simon	41.6	
6	Dominican Republic	Alberto Torres, Enriue Almarante, Miguel Rodríguez, Porfirio Veras	41.7	
7	Netherlands Antilles	Jorge Floranus, Urnic Wiel, Salomon Martinus, Sigfried Merced	41.8	

=== 4 × 400 metres relay ===
Heats – 7 March

Rank	Heat	Team	Athletes	Time	Notes
1	1	Puerto Rico	Tomás Fernández, Raymond Garay, Orominio Santaella, Carlos Morell	3:10.4	Q
2	1	Dominican Republic	Radames Mora, Sixto Lora, David Soriano, Enrique Almarante	3:16.8	Q
3	1	Trinidad and Tobago	George Simon, Christopher Brathwaite, Gerald Donatien, Hasely Crawford	3:17.0	Q
4	1	Nicaragua	Juan Argüello, Francisco Menocal, Julio López, Abraham Real	3:26.2	
1	2	Cuba	Miguel Olivera, Rodobaldo Díaz, Juan García, Antonio Álvarez	3:09.3	Q
2	2	Mexico	Melesio Piña, Carmelo Reyes, Francisco Sardo, Alejandro Sánchez	3:09.7	Q
3	2	Venezuela	Héctor López, Raúl Dome, Manuel Guerra, Misael Curiel	3:12.3	Q
4	2	Panama	Alberto Bloomfield, Rafael Dassent, Jacinto Tejada, Ricardo Bailey	3:16.5	q

Final – 8 March

Rank	Team	Athletes	Time	Notes
1st place, gold medalist(s)	Cuba	Miguel Olivera, Rodobaldo Díaz, Juan García, Antonio Álvarez	3:06.4	GR
2nd place, silver medalist(s)	Mexico	Melesio Piña, Carmelo Reyes, Francisco Sardo, Alejandro Sánchez	3:07.8	
3rd place, bronze medalist(s)	Puerto Rico	Tomás Fernández, Raymond Garay, Orominio Santaella, Carlos Morell	3:09.0	
4	Venezuela	Héctor López, Raúl Dome, Manuel Guerra, Misael Curiel	3:09.1	
5	Panama	Alberto Bloomfield, Rafael Dassent, Jacinto Tejada, Ricardo Bailey	3:15.5	
	Dominican Republic		?	
	Trinidad and Tobago		?	

=== 20 kilometres walk ===
2 March

Rank	Name	Nationality	Time	Notes
1st place, gold medalist(s)	Eladio Campos	Mexico	1:41:14	GR
2nd place, silver medalist(s)	Francisco Chávez	Mexico	1:43:19	
3rd place, bronze medalist(s)	Lucas Lara	Cuba	1:44:38	
4	Pablo Colín	Mexico	1:49:01	
5	Ángel Torres	Cuba	1:51:17	
6	Humberto Fernández	Colombia	1:53:22	
7	Miguel Hernández	Colombia	1:58:92	
8	Fernando Villanueva	Panama	2:01:11	
9	Hugo Norori	Nicaragua	2:05:01	
10	Carlos Vanegas	Nicaragua	2:05:01	
11	Roberto Castellano	El Salvador	2:11:32	
12	Manuel Caicedo	Panama	2:15:10	
13	Carlos Vallecillo	Nicaragua	2:17:43	
14	Juan Smith	Panama	2:20:04	
	?	Puerto Rico	DQ	
	?	Cuba	DQ	

=== High jump ===
8 March

Rank	Name	Nationality	Result	Notes
1st place, gold medalist(s)	Miguel Durañona	Cuba	2.06	GR
2nd place, silver medalist(s)	Teodoro Palacios	Guatemala	1.98	
3rd place, bronze medalist(s)	Lloyd Turnquist	Bahamas	1.95	
4	Jorge Wilson	Cuba	1.95	
5	Gabriel Cepeda	Puerto Rico	1.95	
6	Bernabe Luaces	Cuba	1.90	
7	Trevor Tennant	Jamaica	1.90	
8	Cecilio Wilson	Panama	1.85	
9	Joseph Reid	Panama	1.85	
10	Glenn Krieger	United States Virgin Islands	1.80	
11	Rudolph Thompson	United States Virgin Islands	1.75	
12	Alfredo Grimes	Panama	1.75	

=== Pole vault ===
4 March

Rank	Name	Nationality	Result	Notes
1st place, gold medalist(s)	Juan Laza	Cuba	4.65	
2nd place, silver medalist(s)	Arturo Esquerra	Mexico	4.40	
3rd place, bronze medalist(s)	Jorge Miranda	Puerto Rico	4.30	
4	José Sánchez	Cuba	4.20	
5	Luis Rossi	Panama	4.20	
6	Jorge Negrón	Puerto Rico	3.90	
	Roberto Moré	Cuba	DNF	

=== Long jump ===
6 March

Rank	Name	Nationality	Result	Notes
1st place, gold medalist(s)	Abelardo Pacheco	Cuba	7.69	GR
2nd place, silver medalist(s)	Jorge Stevens	Cuba	7.49	
3rd place, bronze medalist(s)	Galdino Flores	Mexico	7.43	
4	Ernesto Boy	Cuba	7.42	
5	Samuel Cruz	Puerto Rico	7.40	
6	Wilfredo Maisonave	Puerto Rico	7.33	
7	Jorge Toro	Puerto Rico	7.21	
8	Nelson Jáen	Panama	6.85	
9	Roberto Fernández	Panama	6.68	
10	Oswin Martina	Netherlands Antilles	6.49	
11	James Carter	Panama	6.36	
12	Yodi Elizondo	Nicaragua	6.12	

=== Triple jump ===
5 March

Rank	Name	Nationality	Result	Notes
1st place, gold medalist(s)	Pedro Pérez	Cuba	16.33	GR
2nd place, silver medalist(s)	José Hernández	Cuba	15.79	
3rd place, bronze medalist(s)	Juan Velásquez	Cuba	15.61	
4	Jorge Toro	Puerto Rico	15.46	
5	Tim Barrett	Bahamas	15.32	
6	John Veira	Suriname	15.27	
7	Efren Alfonso	Puerto Rico	15.18	
8	Héctor Corro	Panama	13.78	
9	Efrin Medina	Dominican Republic	12.52	
10	Adan Hodgson	Nicaragua	12.51	
11	Avelino Torrentes	Nicaragua	12.25	

=== Shot put ===
1 March

Rank	Name	Nationality	Result	Notes
1st place, gold medalist(s)	Benigno Hodelín	Cuba	16.46	GR
2nd place, silver medalist(s)	Silván Hemming	Cuba	16.29	
3rd place, bronze medalist(s)	Modesto Mederos	Cuba	15.28	
4	Jorge Marrero	Puerto Rico	15.03	
5	Henri Borger	Suriname	14.66	
6	Randall Clerck	Nicaragua	14.03	
7	Iván Turcios	Nicaragua	13.86	
8	Guillermo Earle	Panama	12.39	
9	Zenón Portillo	Panama	12.23	
10	José Rodríguez	Panama	12.23	

=== Discus throw ===
2 March

Rank	Name	Nationality	Result	Notes
1st place, gold medalist(s)	Bárbaro Cañizares	Cuba	56.04	GR
2nd place, silver medalist(s)	Dagoberto González	Colombia	54.48	AR
3rd place, bronze medalist(s)	Javier Moreno	Cuba	53.64	
4	Gustavo Gutiérrez	Colombia	51.40	
5	Julián Morrinson	Cuba	51.10	
6	Ignasio Reina	Puerto Rico	50.14	
7	Leopold Blake	Jamaica	48.98	
8	Lambertus Rebel	Netherlands Antilles	47.18	
9	Arturo Báez	Dominican Republic	44.34	
10	Armando Mejía	Nicaragua	43.44	
11	Iván Turcios	Nicaragua	42.56	
12	Agustín Pérez	Dominican Republic	34.96	
13	Juan Blandford	Panama	34.72	
14	Virgilio Camargo	Panama	31.48	

=== Hammer throw ===
4 March

Rank	Name	Nationality	Result	Notes
1st place, gold medalist(s)	Víctor Suárez	Cuba	57.06	
2nd place, silver medalist(s)	Pedro Granell	Puerto Rico	53.74	
3rd place, bronze medalist(s)	Jesús Ulloa	Cuba	52.26	
4	Jesús Fuentes	Cuba	52.04	
5	Gustavo Morales	Nicaragua	49.08	
6	José Castro	Puerto Rico	47.80	
7	Marcelo Piedras	Mexico	47.70	
8	Julián Núñez	Mexico	47.14	
9	Francisco Argüello	Nicaragua	42.76	
10	Roberto Silva	Nicaragua	42.54	
11	Carlos Hasbún	El Salvador	40.86	
12	Jorge Bermúdez	Panama	33.54	
13	Zenón Portillo	Panama	30.48	

=== Javelin throw ===
3 March – Old model

Rank	Name	Nationality	Result	Notes
1st place, gold medalist(s)	Amado Morales	Puerto Rico	76.40	GR
2nd place, silver medalist(s)	Don Vélez	Nicaragua	72.12	
3rd place, bronze medalist(s)	Justo Perelló	Cuba	70.52	
4	Juan Jarvis	Cuba	69.52	
5	Humberto Cintrón	Puerto Rico	66.02	
6	Francisco Mena	Cuba	65.14	
7	Gustavo Gutiérrez	Colombia	65.02	
8	Jorge García	Puerto Rico	63.94	
9	Ramón Rodríguez	Venezuela	63.40	
10	Salom Robins	Mexico	63.00	
11	Arismendi Barria	Panama	55.06	
12	Adan Hodgson	Nicaragua	53.98	
13	Tauro Howard	Panama	48.52	
14	Anthony Minguel	Netherlands Antilles	47.50	

=== Decathlon ===
6–7 March – 1962 tables

The highest mark recorded in each event is highlighted in yellow

Rank	Athlete	Nationality	100m	LJ	SP	HJ	400m	110m H	DT	PV	JT	1500m	Points	Notes
1st place, gold medalist(s)	Jesús Mirabal	Cuba	10.5	6.92	11.92	1.80	50.0	14.7	29.68	3.80	58.52	5:13.7	6997	GR
2nd place, silver medalist(s)	José Díaz	Cuba	10.7	7.31	12.21	1.90	52.1	16.0	39.76	3.70	49.68	5:23.8	6934	
3rd place, bronze medalist(s)	Héctor Thomas	Venezuela	10.9	6.72	13.29	1.70	53.0	16.7	40.34	4.20	64.28	5:15.1	6918	
4	Don Vélez	Nicaragua	11.5	6.03	12.63	1.70	53.2	15.9	35.20	3.50	62.94	5:11.7	6359	
5	Guillermo González	Puerto Rico	10.5	6.75	11.30	1.75	52.1	18.2	28.86	4.50	45.24	5:34.1	6358	
6	Orlando Pedroso	Cuba	11.4	6.23	12.15	1.70	51.2	16.3	38.76	3.30	51.16	5:07.3	6330	
7	Galdino Flores	Mexico	11.2	7.05	10.66	1.75	52.0	16.5	31.36	3.00	41.26	4:37.5	6234	
8	Jorge Rondón	Puerto Rico	11.3	6.57	11.78	1.75	51.3	16.8	33.30	3.20	43.74	5:04.6	6170	
9	Néstor Villegas	Colombia	11.2	6.37	13.52	1.70	50.0	16.8	39.86	2.20	44.24	4:52.9	6162	
10	Roberto Carmona	Mexico	11.0	NM	13.39	1.60	50.5	16.6	39.44	3.30	56.50	4:29.7	6064	
11	Adan Hodgson	Nicaragua	11.7	6.28	11.35	1.50	54.4	17.3	26.60	3.00	55.12	5:10.4	5497	
12	Luis Rossi	Panama	12.4	5.75	10.14	1.70	57.2	18.8	29.54	4.10	39.80	5:26.6	5217	
13	Rafael Santos	El Salvador	11.5	5.73	8.94	1.60	53.4	18.5	24.54	2.80	45.52	4:41.9	5209	
14	Leroy Rogers	Panama	12.3	5.45	10.73	1.45	53.9	17.9	30.02	2.40	42.86	4:37.6	4976	
15	Maximo Vargas	Panama	12.2	5.71	11.60	1.40	58.2	21.1	32.58	2.40	48.50	5:07.37	4671	
16	Reynaldo Vallecillo	Nicaragua	12.0	5.41	8.96	1.35	55.0	18.8	26.82	3.00	45.36	5:20.4	4603	
	Jesús Villegas	Colombia	10.9	DNS	–	–	–	–	–	–	–	–	DNF	

== Women's results ==
=== 100 metres ===
Heats – 2 March
Wind:
Heat 1: +4.0 m/s m/s, Heat 2: -0.3 m/s, Heat 3: +3.5 m/s

Rank	Heat	Name	Nationality	Time	Notes
1	1	Miguelina Cobián	Cuba	11.2	Q
2	1	Juana Mosquera	Colombia	11.8	Q
3	1	Patricia Morgan	Panama	12.2	
4	1	Claudette Powell	Bahamas	12.4	
5	1	Juliette Hendley	United States Virgin Islands	12.9	
1	2	Cristina Hechevarría	Cuba	11.6	Q, GR
2	2	Nivia Trejos	Panama	12.2	Q
3	2	Sandra Johnson	Costa Rica	12.5	
4	2	Claudia Fergusson	Bahamas	13.0	
5	2	Mayra Elizondo	Nicaragua	13.9	
1	3	Fulgencia Romay	Cuba	11.4	Q
2	3	Adlin Mair	Jamaica	11.8	Q
3	3	Joan Porter	Trinidad and Tobago	12.0	q
4	3	Yolanda Knight	Panama	12.4	
5	3	Hattie Maxey	Bahamas	12.5	
6	3	Zoraida Ortega	Nicaragua	13.5	

Final – 3 March

Wind: +2.1 m/s

Rank	Lane	Name	Nationality	Time	Notes
1st place, gold medalist(s)		Miguelina Cobián	Cuba	11.4	
2nd place, silver medalist(s)		Fulgencia Romay	Cuba	11.6	
3rd place, bronze medalist(s)		Cristina Hechevarría	Cuba	11.6	
4		Adlin Mair	Jamaica	12.0	
5		Juana Mosquera	Colombia	12.1	
6		Joan Porter	Trinidad and Tobago	12.2	
7		Nivia Trejos	Panama	12.4	

=== 200 metres ===
Heats – 5 March
Wind:
Heat 1: 0.0 m/s m/s, Heat 2: +3.2 m/s, Heat 3: +1.0 m/s

Rank	Heat	Name	Nationality	Time	Notes
1	1	Miguelina Cobián	Cuba	23.6	Q
2	1	Juana Mosquera	Colombia	24.8	Q
3	1	Margarita Martínez	Panama	25.4	
4	1	Joan Porter	Trinidad and Tobago	26.2	
5	1	Hattie Maxey	Bahamas	26.2	
1	2	Violeta Quesada	Cuba	23.8	Q
2	2	Patricia Morgan	Panama	25.0	Q
3	2	Sandra Johnson	Costa Rica	25.5	
4	2	Juliette Hendley	United States Virgin Islands	26.6	
5	2	Claudia Fergusson	Bahamas	26.8	
1	3	Fulgencia Romay	Cuba	23.9	Q
2	3	Adlin Mair	Jamaica	25.0	Q
3	3	Nivia Trejos	Panama	25.2	q
4	3	Claudette Powell	Bahamas	26.2	
5	3	Russel Carrero	Nicaragua	27.3	

Final – 6 March

Wind: 0.0 m/s

Rank	Lane	Name	Nationality	Time	Notes
1st place, gold medalist(s)		Miguelina Cobián	Cuba	23.5	GR
2nd place, silver medalist(s)		Violeta Quesada	Cuba	23.9	
3rd place, bronze medalist(s)		Fulgencia Romay	Cuba	24.3	
4		Juana Mosquera	Colombia	24.9	
5		Patricia Morgan	Panama	25.4	
6		Nivia Trejos	Panama	26.3	
		Adlin Mair	Jamaica	?	

=== 400 metres ===
Heats – 3 March

Rank	Heat	Name	Nationality	Time	Notes
1	1	Carmen Trustée	Cuba	56.6	Q
2	1	Marcela Chivás	Cuba	57.9	Q
3	1	Enriqueta Basilio	Mexico	58.3	Q
4	1	Angela White	Panama	1:00.1	q
5	1	Lourdes Rodríguez	Nicaragua	1:08.4	
1	2	Aurelia Pentón	Cuba	55.9	Q
2	2	Lucía Quiroz	Mexico	56.6	Q
3	2	Rosalía Abadía	Panama	56.6	Q
4	2	Celia Knight	Panama	1:02.3	
5	2	Russel Carrero	Nicaragua	1:03.0	
6	2	Silvia Molina	Guatemala	1:06.9	

Final – 4 March

Rank	Lane	Name	Nationality	Time	Notes
1st place, gold medalist(s)	3	Carmen Trustée	Cuba	52.5	GR
2nd place, silver medalist(s)	1	Aurelia Pentón	Cuba	54.3	
3rd place, bronze medalist(s)	5	Marcela Chivás	Cuba	55.1	
4	6	Lucía Quiroz	Mexico	55.9	
5		Rosalía Abadía	Panama	56.2	
6	2	Enriqueta Basilio	Mexico	57.0	
7		Angela White	Panama	1:00.1	

=== 800 metres ===
Heats – 6 March

Rank	Heat	Name	Nationality	Time	Notes
1	1	Rosalía Abadía	Panama	2:21.9	Q
2	1	Aurelia Pentón	Cuba	2:25.4	Q
3	1	Lucía Quiroz	Mexico	2:26.5	Q
4	1	Silvia Molina	Guatemala	2:30.3	q
5	1	Cynthia Porras	Nicaragua	2:35.5	
1	2	Carmen Trustée	Cuba	2:29.3	Q
2	2	Melquises Fonseca	Cuba	2:29.7	Q
3	2	Miroslava Lawrence	Panama	2:30.8	Q
4	2	Lourdes Rodríguez	Nicaragua	2:37.6	

Final – 7 March

Rank	Name	Nationality	Time	Notes
1st place, gold medalist(s)	Carmen Trustée	Cuba	2:14.8	GR
2nd place, silver medalist(s)	Lucía Quiroz	Mexico	2:15.8	
3rd place, bronze medalist(s)	Rosalía Abadía	Panama	2:16.4	
4	Aurelia Pentón	Cuba	2:16.8	
5	Melquises Fonseca	Cuba	2:19.8	
6	Miroslava Lawrence	Panama	2:32.1	
7	Silvia Molina	Guatemala	2:33.5	

=== 100 metres hurdles ===
Heats – 5 March
Wind:
Heat 1: 0.0 m/s m/s, Heat 2: +1.61 m/s

Rank	Heat	Name	Nationality	Time	Notes
1	1	Marlene Elejalde	Cuba	13.7	Q, GR
2	1	Enriqueta Basilio	Mexico	14.4	Q
3	1	Mercedes Román	Mexico	14.7	Q
4	1	Beatriz Aparicio	Panama	16.3	q
1	2	Raquel Martínez	Cuba	14.1	Q
2	2	Lourdes Jones	Cuba	14.2	Q
3	2	Eva Foster	Panama	17.6	Q

Final – 6 March

Wind: +2.54 m/s

Rank	Lane	Name	Nationality	Time	Notes
1st place, gold medalist(s)		Marlene Elejalde	Cuba	13.9	
2nd place, silver medalist(s)		Lourdes Jones	Cuba	14.2	
3rd place, bronze medalist(s)		Raquel Martínez	Cuba	14.5	
4		Enriqueta Basilio	Mexico	14.6	
5		Mercedes Román	Mexico	15.1	
6		Beatriz Aparicio	Panama	17.0	
		Eva Foster	Panama	?	

=== 4 × 100 metres relay ===
8 March

Rank	Team	Athletes	Time	Notes
1st place, gold medalist(s)	Cuba	Marlene Elejalde, Cristina Hechevarría, Fulgencia Romay, Miguelina Cobián	44.7	GR
2nd place, silver medalist(s)	Panama	Margarita Martínez, Patricia Morgan, Dolores Cox, Nivia Trejos	47.3	
3rd place, bronze medalist(s)	Mexico	Mercedes Román, Enriqueta Basilio, Lucía Quiroz, Silvia Tapia	48.1	
4	Nicaragua	Russel Carrero, Mayra Elizondo, Cynthia Porras, Zoraida Ortega	52.1	

=== High jump ===
5 March

Rank	Name	Nationality	Result	Notes
1st place, gold medalist(s)	Hilda Fabré	Cuba	1.73	GR
2nd place, silver medalist(s)	Lucía Duquet	Cuba	1.68	
3rd place, bronze medalist(s)	Marima Rodríguez	Cuba	1.64	
4	Audrey Reid	Jamaica	1.62	
5	Silvia Tapia	Mexico	1.58	
6	Amparo Bravo	Colombia	1.56	
7	Shelly Guerrero	Panama	1.50	
8	Diva Bishop	Panama	1.45	
8	Claudette Powell	Bahamas	1.45	
10	Cynthia Porras	Nicaragua	1.35	

=== Long jump ===
1 March

Rank	Name	Nationality	#1	#2	#3	#4	#5	#6	Result	Notes
1st place, gold medalist(s)	Marcia Garbey	Cuba	6.60w						6.60w	
2nd place, silver medalist(s)	Marina Samuells	Cuba	6.24*	6.31w					6.31w	GR*
3rd place, bronze medalist(s)	Miriam Pupo	Cuba	6.00w						6.00w	
4	Mercedes Román	Mexico							5.81	
5	Lucía Vaamonde	Venezuela							5.75	
6	Claudia Fergusson	Bahamas							5.72	
7	Rosa Aguilar	Panama							5.56	
8	Beatriz Aparicio	Panama							5.46	
9	Russel Carrero	Nicaragua							4.67	

=== Shot put ===
8 March

Rank	Name	Nationality	Result	Notes
1st place, gold medalist(s)	Grecia Hamilton	Cuba	14.56	GR
2nd place, silver medalist(s)	Hilda Ramírez	Cuba	13.85	
3rd place, bronze medalist(s)	Carmen Romero	Cuba	13.63	
4	Guadalupe Lartigue	Mexico	12.98	
5	Isolina Vergara	Colombia	11.40	
6	Cheryl Wray	Panama	10.73	
7	Marta Vásquez	El Salvador	10.73	
8	Amarilis Ortega	Panama	9.89	
9	Mary Espinosa	Nicaragua	9.03	

=== Discus throw ===
5 March

Rank	Name	Nationality	Result	Notes
1st place, gold medalist(s)	Carmen Romero	Cuba	53.54	GR
2nd place, silver medalist(s)	María Cristina Betancourt	Cuba	46.08	
3rd place, bronze medalist(s)	Hilda Ramírez	Cuba	44.10	
4	Isolina Vergara	Colombia	42.26	
5	Guadalupe Lartigue	Mexico	37.00	
6	Amarilis Ortega	Panama	31.28	
7	Mary Espinosa	Nicaragua	30.74	
8	Euda Araújo	Panama	28.68	

=== Javelin throw ===
5 March – Old model

Rank	Name	Nationality	Result	Notes
1st place, gold medalist(s)	Tomasa Núñez	Cuba	45.64	GR
2nd place, silver medalist(s)	Hilda Ramírez	Cuba	45.46	
3rd place, bronze medalist(s)	Flor Umaña	Colombia	43.54	
4	Milagros Bayard	Cuba	43.02	
5	Ana López	Panama	37.84	
6	Zoila Carrillo	Venezuela	36.40	
7	Phillis Cornwall	Panama	36.06	
8	Mary Espinosa	Nicaragua	32.76	
9	Olga García	Panama	29.32	
10	Ivelisse Suandi	Dominican Republic	29.32	

=== Pentathlon ===
3–4 March

The highest mark recorded in each event is highlighted in yellow

Rank	Name	Nationality	100m H	SP	HJ	LJ	200m	Points	Notes
1st place, gold medalist(s)	Marlene Elejalde	Cuba	13.9	10.84	1.50	5.39	24.1	4534	GR
2nd place, silver medalist(s)	Marcia Garbey	Cuba	14.9	8.42	1.58	6.17	24.7	4428	
3rd place, bronze medalist(s)	Mercedes Román	Mexico	14.7	10.15	1.50	5.66	26.3	4243	
4	Silvia Tapia	Mexico	15.5	9.41	1.58	5.46	26.0	4155	
5	Lucía Vaamonde	Venezuela	15.7	10.10	1.52	5.60	26.0	4153	
6	Daisy Hechevarría	Cuba	14.6	10.72	1.35	5.57	25.7	4150	
7	Rosa Aguilar	Panama	19.2	6.80	1.30	5.28	27.0	3151	
8	Cynthia Porras	Nicaragua	19.2	7.25	1.30	4.10	28.6	2771	
	Russel Carrero	Nicaragua	19.9	7.78	NM	4.50	DNS	DNF	
