= Miguel Núñez =

Miguel Núñez may refer to:

- Miguel Núñez (footballer), Spanish footballer
- Miguel Núñez (athlete), Dominican Republic middle-distance runner
- Miguel A. Núñez Jr., American actor
- Miguel Núñez (theologian), Dominican–American doctor, author and theologian
- Miguel Núñez de Sanabria, Spanish official in Peru
