= Enriqueta Basilio =

Mexican athlete (1948–2019)

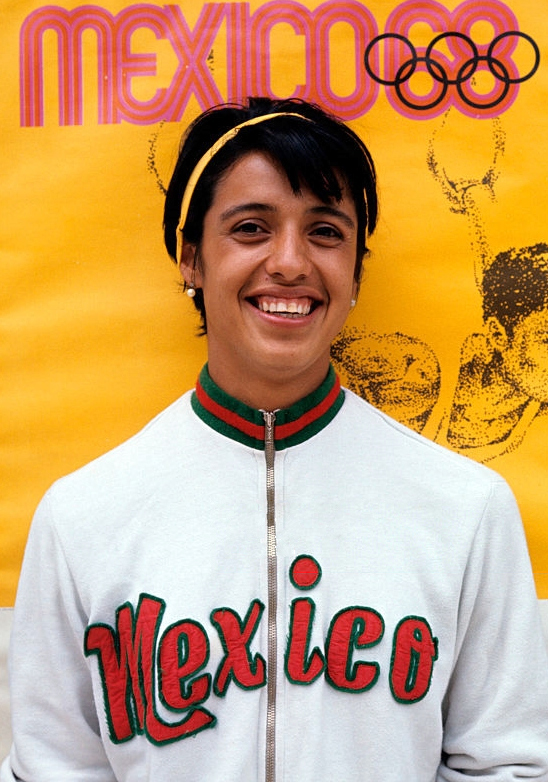
- Basilio during the 1968 Summer Olympics

Personal information
- Born: 15 July 1948 Mexicali, Baja California, Mexico
- Died: 26 October 2019 (aged 71)
- Height: 1.76 m (5 ft 9 in)
- Weight: 59 kg (130 lb)

Sport
- Sport: Sprint, hurdles

Achievements and titles
- Personal bests: 12.3 (100 m, 1968); 55.0 (400 m, 1968); 11.20 (80 m/h, 1968).
Medal record
Women's Athletics
Representing Mexico
Central American and Caribbean Games
Bronze medal – third place	1970 Panama City	4 x 100 metres relay

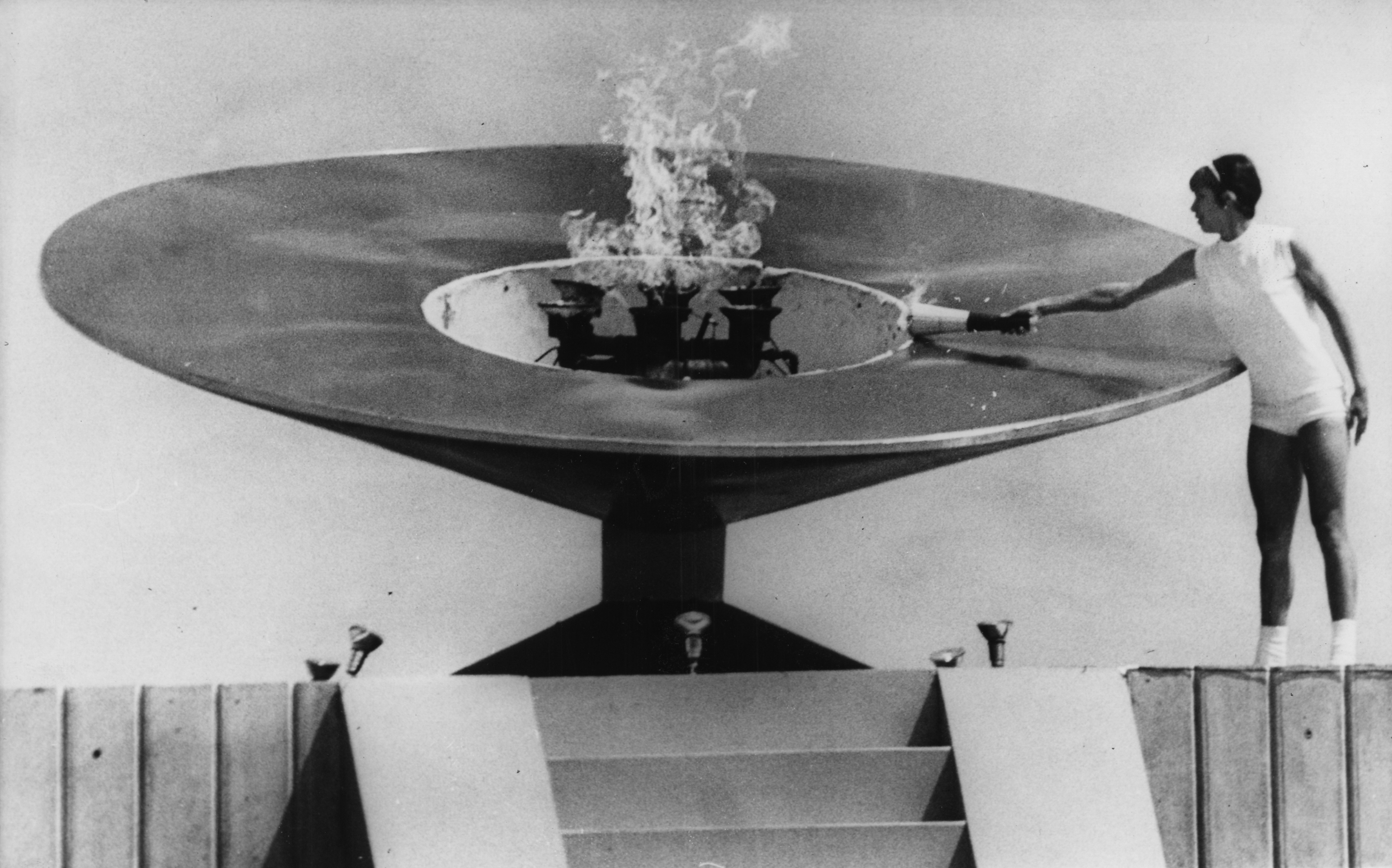
Enriqueta Basilio carrying the Olympic torch and lighting the cauldron, becoming the first woman in Olympic history to do so.

Norma Enriqueta "Queta" Basilio Sotelo (15 July 1948 – 26 October 2019) was a Mexican track and field athlete. She was born in Mexicali, capital of Baja California. She came from an athletic family; her father was a cotton farmer. Her Polish coach, Włodzimierz Puzio, moved her from high jumping to hurdling. She made history by becoming the first woman to light the Olympic Cauldron. She was the last torch-bearer of the 19th Summer Olympics in Mexico City on 12 October 1968.

She was a national athletics champion and record-holder in 80 metres hurdles and finished seventh in this event at the 1967 Pan American Games. At the 1968 Olympics she was eliminated in the heats of the 400 metres, 80 metres hurdles and 4 × 100 metres relay events. In 1970, she took bronze in the Central American and Caribbean Games 4 × 100 m relay.

She married the basketball player Mario Álvarez, who was later secretary to the Oaxaca state governor. She was widowed with three young children when he died in an aeroplane accident. She studied sociology at the National Autonomous University of Mexico and became a federal deputy for the Institutional Revolutionary Party (PRI) during the LVIII Legislature of the Mexican Congress.

She became a permanent member of the Mexico Olympic Committee and was part of the 2004 Olympic torch relay when it was passing through Mexico City. In 2014, she was amongst 6,500 people defrauded of their savings in a money-lending business scam. She died of pneumonia on 26 October 2019, aged 71.

On 15 October 2020, the small moon of trojan asteroid 3548 Eurybates was named Queta after her, making her the first Olympic athlete honored in this way.

== International competitions ==
Year	Competition	Venue	Position	Event	Notes
Representing Mexico
1967	Pan American Games	Winnipeg, Canada	7th	80 m hurdles	11.83
1967	Pan American Games	Winnipeg, Canada	–	4 × 100 m relay	DQ
1967	Central American and Caribbean Championships	Xalapa, Mexico	3rd	80 m hurdles	12.1
1967	Central American and Caribbean Championships	Xalapa, Mexico	2nd	4 × 100 m relay	49.6
1968	Olympic Games	Mexico City, Mexico	23rd (h)	400 m	55.6
1968	Olympic Games	Mexico City, Mexico	25th (h)	80 m hurdles	11.1
1968	Olympic Games	Mexico City, Mexico	12th (h)	4 × 100 m relay	47.0
1970	Central American and Caribbean Games	Panama City, Panama	6th	400 m	57.0
1970	Central American and Caribbean Games	Panama City, Panama	4th	100 m hurdles	14.6
1970	Central American and Caribbean Games	Panama City, Panama	3rd	4 × 100 m relay	48.1
1971	Central American and Caribbean Championships	Kingston, Jamaica	3rd	200 m hurdles	29.0

Olympic Games
Preceded by Alain Calmat	Final Olympic torchbearer Mexico City 1968	Succeeded by Hideki Takada
Preceded by Yoshinori Sakai	Final Summer Olympic torchbearer Mexico City 1968	Succeeded by Günther Zahn
