= Jacinto Sabinal =

Mexican long-distance runner

Personal information
- Full name: Jacinto Sabinal Romero
- Nationality: Mexican
- Born: 12 August 1942 (age 83)
- Height: 1.75 m (5 ft 9 in)
- Weight: 65 kg (143 lb)

Sport
- Sport: Long-distance running
- Event: Marathon

Jacinto Sabinal Romero (born 12 August 1942) is a Mexican long-distance runner. He competed in the marathon at the 1972 Summer Olympics.

== International competitions ==
Year	Competition	Venue	Position	Event	Notes
Representing Mexico
1969	Central American and Caribbean Championships	Havana, Cuba	2nd	Marathon	1:11:35
1970	Central American and Caribbean Games	Panama City, Panama	5th	Marathon	2:54:22
1972	Olympic Games	Munich, West Germany	26th	Marathon	2:22:56
1974	Central American and Caribbean Games	Santo Domingo, Dominican Republic	8th	Marathon	2:40:27

== Personal bests ==
- Marathon – 2:16:10 (1972)
