= Mario Pérez Saldívar =

Mexican long-distance runner (born 1939)

Personal information
- Born: March 13, 1939 (age 87)
Medal record
Men's Athletics
Representing Mexico
Pan American Games
Bronze medal – third place	1971 Cali	5.000 m
Central American and Caribbean Games
Gold medal – first place	1970 Panama City	5.000 m

Mario Pérez Saldívar (born March 13, 1939) is a retired long-distance runner from Mexico. He won the gold medal in the men's 5.000 metres event at the 1970 Central American and Caribbean Games, and competed for his native country at the 1972 Summer Olympics in Munich, West Germany.

== International competitions ==
Year	Competition	Venue	Position	Event	Notes
Representing Mexico
1970	Central American and Caribbean Games	Panama City, Panama	3rd	1500 m	3:47.2
1970	Central American and Caribbean Games	Panama City, Panama	1st	5000 m	14:24.4
1970	Central American and Caribbean Games	Panama City, Panama	2nd	10,000 m	30:51.6
1971	Pan American Games	Cali, Colombia	3rd	5000 m	14:03.98
1972	Olympic Games	Munich, West Germany	37th (h)	5000 m	13:58.2
1973	Central American and Caribbean Championships	Maracaibo, Venezuela	4th	1500 m	3:48.9
1973	Central American and Caribbean Championships	Maracaibo, Venezuela	2nd	5000 m	14:06.8

== Personal bests ==
- 5,000 metres — 13.45.8 (1971)
