= Jesús Mirabal =

Cuban decathlete

Personal information
- Born: 1948 (age 77–78) Pinar del Rio Province, Cuba
Medal record
Men's Athletics
Representing Cuba
Pan American Games
| Bronze medal – third place | 1971 Cali | Decathlon |
| Bronze medal – third place | 1975 Mexico City | Decathlon |
Central American and Caribbean Games
| Gold medal – first place | 1970 Panama City | Decathlon |
| Gold medal – first place | 1974 Santo Domingo | Decathlon |

Jesús Mirabal Leal (born 1948) is a former Cuban decathlete.

He won the Central American and Caribbean Games in 1970 and 1974 and took bronze medals at the Pan American Games in 1971 and 1975. He was the first Cuban decathlete to break the 7000 point barrier, and eventually established his national record at 7582 points.

== International competitions ==
| Year | Competition | Venue | Position | Event | Notes |
Representing Cuba
| 1969 | Central American and Caribbean Championships | Havana, Cuba | 1st | Decathlon | 6492 pts |
| 1970 | Central American and Caribbean Games | Panama City, Panama | 1st | Decathlon | 6997 pts |
| 1970 | Universiade | Turin, Italy | 14th | Decathlon | 6827 pts |
| 1971 | Central American and Caribbean Championships | Kingston, Jamaica | 2nd | Decathlon | 6692 pts |
| 1971 | Pan American Games | Cali, Colombia | 3rd | Decathlon | 7295 pts |
| 1973 | Central American and Caribbean Championships | Maracaibo, Venezuela | 1st | Decathlon | 7315 pts |
| 1974 | Central American and Caribbean Games | Santo Domingo, Dominican Republic | 1st | Decathlon | 7470 pts |
| 1975 | Pan American Games | Mexico City, Mexico | 3rd | Decathlon | 7582 pts |
