= Brenda Walsh =

Brenda Walsh may refer to:

- Brenda Walsh (sprinter) (born 1952), Canadian athlete
- Brenda Walsh (Beverly Hills, 90210), a TV character portrayed by Shannen Doherty
