= Carlos Hasbún =

Salvadoran hammer thrower

Personal information
- Full name: Carlos Eduardo Hasbún Zablah
- Born: 27 September 1949 (age 76) San Salvador, El Salvador
- Height: 1.82 m (6 ft 0 in)
- Weight: 88 kg (194 lb)

Sport
- Sport: Athletics
- Event: Hammer throw

Carlos Eduardo Hasbún Zablah (born 27 September 1949) is a retired Salvadoran athlete. He competed in the men's hammer throw at the 1968 Summer Olympics.

== International competitions ==
Year	Competition	Venue	Position	Event	Notes
Representing El Salvador
1968	Olympic Games	Mexico City, Mexico	22nd (q)	Hammer throw	37.46 m
1970	Central American and Caribbean Games	Panama City, Panama	11th	Hammer throw	40.86 m
1971	Central American Championships	San José, Costa Rica	1st	Discus throw	36.02 m
1972	Central American Championships	Panama City, Panama	2nd	Discus throw	38.98 m

== Personal bests ==
- Hammer throw – 45.50 (1972)
