= Athletics at the 1971 Pan American Games – Women's 400 metres =

Women's 400 metres at the Pan American Games

The women's 400 metres event at the 1971 Pan American Games was held in Cali on 2 and 3 August. It was the first time that this distance was contested by women at the Games.

== Medalists ==
Gold	Silver	Bronze
Marilyn Neufville; Jamaica	Carmen Trustée; Cuba	Yvonne Saunders; Jamaica

== Results ==
=== Heats ===
Rank	Heat	Name	Nationality	Time	Notes
1	1	Aurelia Pentón	Cuba	53.76	Q
2	1	Marilyn Neufville	Jamaica	53.88	Q
3	3	Yvonne Saunders	Jamaica	53.91	Q
4	3	Brenda Walsh	Canada	54.33	Q
5	2	Carmen Trustée	Cuba	55.09	Q
6	3	Jarvis Scott	United States	55.26	q
7	2	Gwen Norman	United States	55.94	Q
8	1	Joyce Sadowick	Canada	56.01	q
9	2	Josefa Vicent	Uruguay	56.13	
10	2	Elsy Rivas	Colombia	56.74	
11	3	Rosalia Abadía	Panama	57.05	
12	1	Gloria González	Chile	57.12	
13	1	Cristina Filgueira	Argentina	57.19	
14	3	María Cristina Ducci	Chile	57.47	
15	1	Ana Cecilia Maquillón	Colombia	58.67	
16	3	Lorraine Jordan	Guyana	1:00.75	
17	2	Russel Carrero	Nicaragua	1:01.28	

=== Final ===
Rank	Name	Nationality	Time	Notes
1st place, gold medalist(s)	Marilyn Neufville	Jamaica	52.34	
2nd place, silver medalist(s)	Carmen Trustée	Cuba	52.89	
3rd place, bronze medalist(s)	Yvonne Saunders	Jamaica	53.13	
4	Aurelia Pentón	Cuba	53.62	
5	Brenda Walsh	Canada	54.61	
6	Joyce Sadowick	Canada	54.88	
7	Gwen Norman	United States	55.46	
8	Jarvis Scott	United States	56.33	
