= 1971 Central American Championships in Athletics =

VI Central American Championships in Athletics
- Dates: November 19–21
- Host city: San José, Costa Rica
- Venue: Pista Eduardo Garnier
- Level: Senior
- Participation: 6 nations

The sixth Central American Championships in Athletics were held at the Pista Eduardo Garnier in San José, Costa Rica, between November 19–21, 1971.

== Medal summary ==
Some results and medal winners could be reconstructed from the archive of Costa Rican newspaper La Nación.

=== Men ===
Event	Gold		Silver		Bronze	
100 metres	Carl Edmund (PAN)	10.3	Mario Shannon (PAN)	10.5	Rolando Mendieta (PAN)	10.8
200 metres	Carl Edmund (PAN)	22.5	Carlos Abbot (CRC)	22.7	Juan Argüello (NCA)	23.1
400 metres	Carlos Abbot (CRC)	49.0	Francisco Menocal (NCA)	49.8	Juan Ardines (PAN)	50.0
800 metres	Martín Vargas (CRC)	1:56.2	Rogelio Valencia (PAN)	1:56.8	Venancio Ponce (HON)	1:58.7
1500 metres						
5000 metres	Rafael Ángel Pérez (CRC)	15:06.5	Victoriano López (GUA)	15:06.5	Hipólito López (HON)	16:11.1
10,000 metres	Rafael Ángel Pérez (CRC)	30:02.2	Victoriano López (GUA)	31:27.4	Julio Quevedo (GUA)	31:37.6
Half Marathon	Fulgencio Hernández (GUA)	1:12:32.0	Clovis Morales (HON)	1:13:17.8	Carlos Cuque López (GUA)	1:13:38.2
110 metres hurdles	Richard Davis (PAN)	15.6	Donald Vélez (NCA)	16.2	Adán Hodson (NCA)	16.3
400 metres hurdles	Ricardo Worrell (PAN)	54.1	Rodolfo Arellano (GUA)	56.3	Yury Peñalba (NCA)	56.6
3000 metres steeplechase						
4 x 100 metres relay	Panama; Carl Edmund; Rolando Mendieta; Federico Herberth; Richard Davis	41.5	Guatemala; Rodolfo Arellana; Oscar Gallardo; Salomón Rowe; Roberto Contreras	42.3	Nicaragua; Juan Argüello; Ricardo Lario; Evaristo Palacios; Yodi Elizondo	42.6
4 x 400 metres relay	Guatemala	3:23.8	Costa Rica	3:26.3	Nicaragua	3:28.3
20 Kilometres Road Walk	Hipólito López (HON)		Raúl Lonzano (HON)		Carlos Venegas (NCA)	
High jump						
Pole vault	Sergio Rubí (NCA)	3.30	Javier Sobrado (CRC)	3.20	Reinaldo Vallecillo (NCA)	3.10
Long jump	Salomón Rowe (GUA)	7.12	Martín Douglas (CRC)	6.63	Roberto Fernández (PAN)	6.47
Triple jump	Martín Douglas (CRC)	14.83	Salomón Rowe (GUA)	13.90	Yodi Elizondo (NCA)	13.79
Shot put	Mauricio Jubis (ESA)	13.47	Enrique Montiel (NCA)	13.43	Iván Turcios (NCA)	13.22
Discus throw	Eduardo Hasbum (ESA)	36.02	Martín Douglas (CRC)	33.34	Donald Vélez (NCA)	32.24
Hammer throw	Gustavo Morales (NCA)	47.34	Francisco Argüello (NCA)	45.16	Roberto Silva (NCA)	41.44
Javelin throw	Donald Vélez (NCA)	66.10	Tauro Blake (PAN)	55.82	Adán Hodson (NCA)	55.60
Pentathlon						

=== Women ===
Event	Gold		Silver		Bronze	
100 metres	Diva Bishop (PAN)	11.1	Sandra Johnson (CRC)	12.8	Clotilde Morales (PAN)	12.8
200 metres						
400 metres						
800 metres	Rosalía Abadía (PAN)	2:22.	Silvia Melgar (GUA)	2:23.	Mirna Ambursley (PAN)	2:27.
1500 metres						
100 metres hurdles	Yolanda Knight (PAN)	16.3	Jean Robotham (CRC)	17.6	Patricia Meighan (GUA)	18.1
4 x 100 metres relay	Panama; Diva Bishop; Clotilde Morales; Yolanda Knight; Rosalía Abadía	49.6	Costa Rica; Brenda Charles; Jean Robotham; Sandra Johnson; Rosa López	49.8	Guatemala; Ingrid Brenner; Patricia Meighan; Silvia Molina; Regina de Herrera	50.1
High jump	Brenda Charles (CRC)	1.42	Flora Torres (ESA)	1.40	Patricia Meighan (GUA)	1.35
Long jump	Rosa Aguilar (PAN)	5.22	Sandra Johnson (CRC)	5.11	Russel Carrero (NCA)	4.99
Shot put	Marta Ramos (ESA)	12.34	Amarilis Ortega (PAN)	10.89	Mercedes Carranza (GUA)	10.70
Discus throw	Mercedes Carranza (GUA)	33.16	Mery Streber (NCA)	32.12	María Victoria Malis (GUA)	32.12
Javelin throw						
Pentathlon						

== Medal table (incomplete) ==
Only medals from the 27 events with known results from above are counted.

* Host nation (Costa Rica)

Rank	Nation	Gold	Silver	Bronze	Total
1	Panama (PAN)	10	4	5	19
2	Costa Rica (CRC)*	6	9	0	15
3	Guatemala (GUA)	4	6	7	17
4	Nicaragua (NIC)	3	5	13	21
5	El Salvador (ESA)	3	1	0	4
6	Honduras (HON)	1	2	2	5
Totals (6 entries)		27	27	27	81

== Team Rankings ==
Costa Rica won the overall team ranking, Nicaragua won the team ranking in the men's category, and Panamá won the team ranking in the women's category.

=== Total ===
The host country is highlighted in lavender blue

Rank	Nation	Points
1st place, gold medalist(s)	Costa Rica	183
2nd place, silver medalist(s)	(Panama) Panamá	172
3rd place, bronze medalist(s)	Nicaragua	160
4	Guatemala	145
5	El Salvador	59
6	Honduras	37

=== Male ===
The host country is highlighted in lavender blue

Rank	Nation	Points
1st place, gold medalist(s)	Nicaragua	131
2nd place, silver medalist(s)	Costa Rica	129
3rd place, bronze medalist(s)	(Panama) Panamá	93
4	Guatemala	78
5	El Salvador	43
6	Honduras	31

=== Female ===
The host country is highlighted in lavender blue

Rank	Nation	Points
1st place, gold medalist(s)	(Panama) Panamá	79
2nd place, silver medalist(s)	Guatemala	67
3rd place, bronze medalist(s)	Costa Rica	54
4	Nicaragua	39
5	El Salvador	16
6	Honduras	6
