= Donaldo Arza =

Panamanian middle-distance runner (born 1946)

Personal information
- Nationality: Panamanian
- Born: 15 August 1946 (age 79)
- Height: 1.80 m (5 ft 11 in)
- Weight: 69 kg (152 lb)

Sport
- Sport: Middle-distance running
- Event: 800 metres
Medal record
Representing Panama
Central American and Caribbean Games
Silver medal – second place	1970 Panama City	1500m
Bronze medal – third place	1970 Panama City	800m
Summer Universiade
Bronze medal – third place	1970 Turin	800m

Donaldo Arza (born 15 August 1946) is a retired Panamanian middle-distance runner who has represented his country in international competitions. He competed in the men's 800 metres at the 1972 Summer Olympics. Arza finished fourth in the 1500 metres at the 1971 Pan American Games.

== International competitions ==
Year	Competition	Venue	Position	Event	Notes
Representing Panama
1970	Central American and Caribbean Games	Panama City, Panama	3rd	800 m	1:50.3
1970	Central American and Caribbean Games	Panama City, Panama	2nd	1500 m	3:46.1
1970	Universiade	Turin, Italy	3rd	800 m	1:49.5
1971	Pan American Games	Cali, Colombia	9th (sf)	800 m	1:52.51
1971	Pan American Games	Cali, Colombia	4th	1500 m	3:44.75
1972	Olympic Games	Munich, West Germany	44th (h)	800 m	1:51.2
1972	Olympic Games	Munich, West Germany	16th (h)	1500 m	3:41.8

== Personal bests ==
- 800 metres – 1:48.5 (1971)
- 1500 metres – 3:41.73 (1972)
