= Claudette Powell =

Bahamian sprinter

Personal information
- Full name: Claudette Karen Powell
- Nationality: Bahamian
- Born: 24 October 1952 (age 72)
- Height: 1.68 m (5 ft 6 in)
- Weight: 51 kg (112 lb)

Sport
- Sport: Sprinting
- Event: 100 metres

Claudette Karen Powell (born 24 October 1952) is a retired Bahamian sprinter. She competed in the women's 100 metres at the 1972 Summer Olympics. She was the first woman to represent the Bahamas at the Olympics.

== International competitions ==
Year	Competition	Venue	Position	Event	Notes
Representing the Bahamas
1970	Central American and Caribbean Games	Panama City, Panama	9th (h)	100 m	12.4 (w)
1970	Central American and Caribbean Games	Panama City, Panama	10th (h)	200 m	26.2
1970	Central American and Caribbean Games	Panama City, Panama	8th	High jump	1.45 m
1970	British Commonwealth Games	Edinburgh, United Kingdom	25th (h)	100 m	12.21
1970	British Commonwealth Games	Edinburgh, United Kingdom	27th (h)	200 m	25.7
1971	Central American and Caribbean Championships	Kingston, Jamaica	7th	100 m	12.4
1971	Pan American Games	Cali, Colombia	12th (h)	100 m	12.01^{1}
1971	Pan American Games	Cali, Colombia	17th (h)	200 m	25.12
1972	Olympic Games	Munich, West Germany	35th (h)	100 m	12.01

^{1}Did not start in the semifinals

== Personal bests ==
- 100 metres – 12.01 (1972)
