= Carlos Cuque López =

Guatemalan long-distance runner

Personal information
- Born: 24 November 1945 (age 80) Guatemala
- Height: 1.60 m (5 ft 3 in)
- Weight: 50 kg (110 lb)

Sport
- Sport: Long-distance running
Medal record
Representing Guatemala
Central American Games
Gold medal – first place	1973 Guatemala	Marathon
Central American Championships
Gold medal – first place	1968 Managua	Marathon
Bronze medal – third place	1971 San José	Half-marathon

Carlos Octavio Cuque López (born 24 November 1945) is a former long-distance runner from Guatemala. He competed in the marathon and 5000 m at the 1968 and 1972 Summer Olympics and finished around the 40th position in the marathon in both Games.

He won the marathon event at the 1973 Central American Games setting a new Games record at 2h23:52. He finished fifth in the marathon at the 1971 Pan American Games.

== International competitions ==
Year	Competition	Venue	Position	Event	Notes
Representing Guatemala
1968	Central American Championships	Managua, Nicaragua	1st	Marathon	2:39:12
1968	Olympic Games	Mexico City, Mexico	39th	Marathon	2:45:20
1970	Central American and Caribbean Games	Panama City, Panama	16th	5000 m	16:24.0
1970	Central American and Caribbean Games	Panama City, Panama	6th	Marathon	2:57:29
1970	Central American Championships	Guatemala City, Guatemala	2nd	5000 m	15:39.3
1970	Central American Championships	Guatemala City, Guatemala	2nd	10,000 m	32:14.5
1970	Central American Championships	Guatemala City, Guatemala	2nd	Half marathon	
1971	Pan American Games	Cali, Colombia	14th	5000 m	15:46.9
1971	Pan American Games	Cali, Colombia	5th	Marathon	2:33:14
1971	Central American Championships	San José, Costa Rica	3rd	Half Marathon	1:13:38.2
1972	Olympic Games	Munich, West Germany	61st (h)	5000 m	15:53.4
1972	Olympic Games	Munich, West Germany	43rd	Marathon	2:28:37
1973	Central American Games	Guatemala City, Guatemala	1st	Marathon	2:23:52
1974	Central American and Caribbean Games	Santo Domingo, Dominican Republic	4th	Marathon	2:35:16
1975	Pan American Games	Mexico City, Mexico	–	Marathon	DNF
1980	Central American Championships	Guatemala City, Guatemala	1st	Marathon	2:19:20

== Personal bests ==
- 5000 m – 14:40.5 (1971)
- Marathon – 2h19:20 (1980)
