= Juan Máximo Martínez =

Mexican long-distance runner (1947–2021)

Personal information
- Born: January 1, 1947 Mexico City, Mexico
- Died: May 25, 2021 (aged 74)
- Height: 1.65 m (5 ft 5 in)
- Weight: 53 kg (117 lb)
Medal record
Men's athletics
Representing Mexico
Central American and Caribbean Games
Gold medal – first place	1970 Panama City	10,000 m

Juan Máximo Martínez (January 1, 1947 – May 25, 2021) was a Mexican long-distance runner. He won the gold medal in the men's 10,000 metres at the 1970 Central American and Caribbean Games, and twice competed for his native country at the Summer Olympics: in 1968 and 1972. In 1968, at the Mexico City Olympics, he finished in 4th place in both the 5,000 metres and 10,000 metres. In 1972, at the Munich Olympics, he finished 10th in the 10,000 metres.

== International competitions ==
Year	Competition	Venue	Position	Event	Notes
Representing Mexico
1966	Central American and Caribbean Games	San Juan, Puerto Rico	3rd	10,000 m	32:13.0
1967	Pan American Games	Winnipeg, Canada	3rd	5000 m	13:54.0
1967	Pan American Games	Winnipeg, Canada	4th	10,000 m	29:27.2
1967	Central American and Caribbean Championships	Xalapa, Mexico	1st	10,000 m	30:33.6
1967	Central American and Caribbean Championships	Xalapa, Mexico	1st	Half marathon	1:11:02
1968	Olympic Games	Mexico City, Mexico	4th	5000 m	14:10.8
1968	Olympic Games	Mexico City, Mexico	4th	10,000 m	29:35.0
1969	Saint Silvester Road Race	São Paulo, Brazil	1st	8.7 km	24:02
1970	Central American and Caribbean Games	Panama City, Panama	2nd	5000 m	14:24.8
1970	Central American and Caribbean Games	Panama City, Panama	1st	10,000 m	30:49.0
1971	Pan American Games	Cali, Colombia	5th	5000 m	14:14.38
1971	Pan American Games	Cali, Colombia	2nd	10,000 m	29:05.07
1972	Olympic Games	Munich, West Germany	10th	10,000 m	28:44.08

== Personal bests ==
- 5,000 metres – 13.44.0 (1969)
- 10,000 metres – 28.23.14 (1972)
