= Don Vélez =

Nicaraguan long jumper

Personal information
- Full name: Donald Danilo Vélez Espinoza
- Born: 18 January 1948 Managua, Nicaragua
- Died: 11 July 2010 (aged 62) Miami, United States
- Height: 1.80 m (5 ft 11 in)
- Weight: 70 kg (154 lb)

Sport
- Sport: Athletics
- Events: Long jump Javelin
Medal record
Representing Nicaragua
Central American and Caribbean Games
Silver medal – second place	1970 Panama City	Javelin throw
Central American Games
Gold medal – first place	1977 San Salvador	Javelin throw

Donald Danilo 'Don' Vélez Espinoza (18 January 1948 – 11 July 2010) was a Nicaraguan athlete. He competed at the 1968 Summer Olympics and the 1972 Summer Olympics. He won a silver medal in the javelin at the 1970 Central American and Caribbean Games.

== International competitions ==
Year	Competition	Venue	Position	Event	Notes
Representing Nicaragua
1967	Central American and Caribbean Championships	Xalapa, Mexico	2nd	Pentathlon	2847 pts
1968	Central American Championships	Managua, Nicaragua	1st	Javelin throw	55.96 m
1968	Central American Championships	Managua, Nicaragua	1st	Pentathlon	
1968	Olympic Games	Mexico City, Mexico	32nd (q)	Long jump	6.63 m
1968	Olympic Games	Mexico City, Mexico	26th (q)	Javelin throw	61.32 m
1968	Olympic Games	Mexico City, Mexico	19th	Decathlon	5943 pts
1970	Central American and Caribbean Games	Panama City, Panama	11th (h)	110 m hurdles	15.8 s
1970	Central American and Caribbean Games	Panama City, Panama	2nd	Javelin throw	72.12 m
1970	Central American and Caribbean Games	Panama City, Panama	4th	Decathlon	6359 pts
1970	Universiade	Turin, Italy	15th (q)	Javelin throw	67.36 m
1971	Central American and Caribbean Championships	Kingston, Jamaica	6th	Javelin throw	58.88 m
1971	Central American Championships	San José, Costa Rica	2nd	110 m hurdles	16.2 s
1971	Central American Championships	San José, Costa Rica	3rd	Discus throw	32.24 m
1971	Central American Championships	San José, Costa Rica	1st	Javelin throw	66.10 m
1972	Olympic Games	Munich, West Germany	21st (q)	Javelin throw	64.74 m
1975	Central American Championships	San José, Costa Rica	2nd	Javelin throw	61.12 m
1977	Central American Games	San Salvador, El Salvador	1st	Javelin throw	63.40 m

== Personal bests ==
- Long jump – 6.64 m (1968)
- Javelin throw (old model) – 72.12 m (1970)
- Decathlon (1962 tables) – 6195 pts (1970)
