= Russel Carrero =

Nicaraguan sprinter

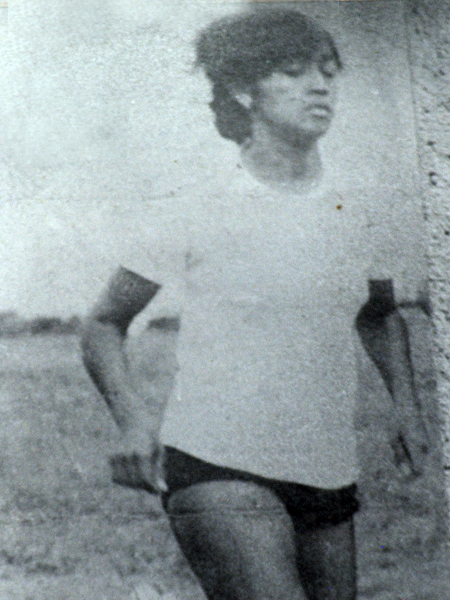

Personal information
- Nationality: Nicaraguan
- Born: 11 December 1950 Chinandega, Nicaragua
- Died: 10 June 1990 (aged 39)
- Height: 1.55 m (5 ft 1 in)
- Weight: 50 kg (110 lb)

Sport
- Sport: Sprinting
- Event: 100 metres

Russel Carrero Trejos (12 December 1950 – 10 June 1990) was a Nicaraguan sprinter. She competed in the women's 100 metres at the 1972 Summer Olympics. She was the first woman to represent Nicaragua at the Olympics.

== International competitions ==
Year	Competition	Venue	Position	Event	Notes
Representing Nicaragua
1970	Central American and Caribbean Games	Panama City, Panama	15th (h)	200 m	27.3
1970	Central American and Caribbean Games	Panama City, Panama	9th (h)	400 m	63.0
1970	Central American and Caribbean Games	Panama City, Panama	4th	4 × 100 m relay	52.1
1970	Central American and Caribbean Games	Panama City, Panama	9th	Long jump	4.67 m
1970	Central American and Caribbean Games	Panama City, Panama	–	Pentathlon	DNF
1971	Central American and Caribbean Championships	Kingston, Jamaica	7th	200 m hurdles	32.9
1971	Pan American Games	Cali, Colombia	23rd (h)	200 m	26.5
1971	Pan American Games	Cali, Colombia	17th (h)	400 m	61.28
1971	Pan American Games	Cali, Colombia	10th (h)	800 m	2:40.74
1971	Pan American Games	Cali, Colombia	10th (h)	Long jump	4.75 m
1971	Central American Championships	San José, Costa Rica	3rd	Long jump	4.99 m
1972	Olympic Games	Munich, West Germany	46th (h)	100 m	13.45
1972	Olympic Games	Munich, West Germany	38th (h)	200 m	28.02^{1}
1975	Central American Championships	San José, Costa Rica	1st	Long jump	4.88 m
1975	Central American Championships	San José, Costa Rica	1st	Pentathlon	2595 m

^{1}Did not start in the quarterfinals
