= Jorge Vizcarrondo =

Puerto Rican sprinter

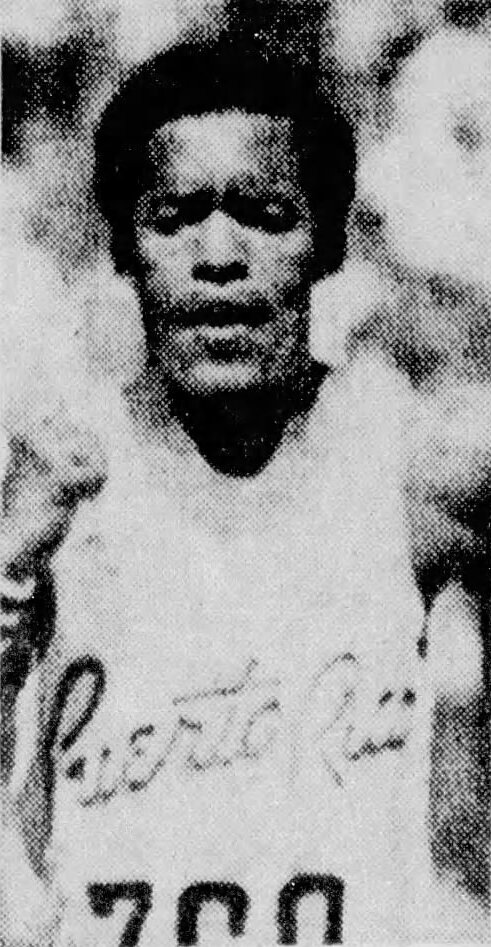
- Vizcarrondo in the 100 metres at the 1972 Olympics

Personal information
- Nationality: Puerto Rican
- Born: Jorge L. Vizcarrondo Somohano; 11 February 1949 Cidra, Puerto Rico
- Died: 3 May 2022 (aged 73)
- Height: 1.70 m (5 ft 7 in)
- Weight: 70 kg (154 lb)

Sport
- Sport: Sprinting
- Event: 100 metres
Medal record
Representing Puerto Rico
Central American and Caribbean Games
Bronze medal – third place	1970 Panama City	4x100m relay

Jorge L. Vizcarrondo Somohano (11 February 1949 – 3 May 2022) was a Puerto Rican sprinter who represented his country men's 100-meter dash at both the 1968 Summer Olympics in Mexico City and the 1972 Summer Olympics in Munich. On the regional stage, Vizcarrondo got a bronze medal as a member of the 4 × 100-meter relay team at the 1970 Central American and Caribbean Games. Nationally, he also excelled within the United States collegiate circuit, leading the qualifiers at the NJCAA championships in 1972 while competing for Wharton County Junior College.

== Early life and career ==
He was born on 11 February 1949 in Cidra, Puerto Rico. His parent Roberto Vizcarrondo and Carmen Somohano. Jorge completed part of his early schooling at Colegio San Agustín. By age fifteen, he was already excelling in track and field while attending José Celso Barbosa High School in Puerta de Tierra and Román Baldorioty de Castro High School in Old San Juan. In 1975, he graduated with a degree in natural sciences from the Catholic University of Puerto Rico. He technically qualified for the Central American Games in 1966, but was barred from competing because he had not yet reached the minimum age requirement of 16. The following year, he made his international debut, representing his country in the 100-meter dash at the 1967 Pan American Games in Winnipeg, Canada.

His Olympic debut was in the 100 meters at the 1968 Summer Olympics, where he finished 7th in Heat 2 of the quarterfinals. Then he won a bronze medal in the 4 x 100 m relay at the 1970 Central American and Caribbean Games, alongside Enrique Montalvo, Víctor López, and Arnaldo Bristole. He returned to compete in the 100 meters at the 1972 Summer Olympics, finishing 6th in heat 10 of the quarterfinals.[. In 1972, representing the Wharton County Junior College Pioneers, Vizcarrondo led the NJCAA championship qualifiers in the men's 100 yards with a time of 9.6 seconds.

== Personal life ==
He married Sandra Calderón and has two daughters.

== International competitions ==
Year	Competition	Venue	Position	Event	Notes
Representing Puerto Rico
1967	Pan American Games	Winnipeg, Canada	10th (sf)	100 m	10.56
1967	Pan American Games	Winnipeg, Canada	6th	4 × 100 m relay	40.70
1968	Olympic Games	Mexico City, Mexico	53rd (h)	100 m	10.71
1970	Central American and Caribbean Games	Panama City, Panama	11th (sf)	100 m	10.5
1970	Central American and Caribbean Games	Panama City, Panama	6th	200 m	21.8
1970	Central American and Caribbean Games	Panama City, Panama	3rd	4 × 100 m relay	40.8
1971	Central American and Caribbean Championships	Kingston, Jamaica	8th	100 m	10.9
1971	Central American and Caribbean Championships	Kingston, Jamaica	2nd	4 × 100 m relay	40.7
1971	Pan American Games	Cali, Colombia	4th	4 × 100 m relay	40.46
1972	Olympic Games	Munich, West Germany	57th (h)	100 m	10.79
1972	Olympic Games	Munich, West Germany	23rd (h)	4 × 100 m relay	41.34
1973	Universiade	Moscow, Soviet Union	23rd (h)	100 m	10.88
1974	Central American and Caribbean Games	Santo Domingo, Dominican Republic	6th	100 m	10.93
1974	Central American and Caribbean Games	Santo Domingo, Dominican Republic	10th (sf)	200 m	21.81
1974	Central American and Caribbean Games	Santo Domingo, Dominican Republic	–	4 × 100 m relay	DQ

== Personal bests ==
- 100 metres – 10.2 (1968)
