= Gustavo Morales (athlete) =

Nicaraguan hammer thrower

Personal information
- Nationality: Nicaraguan
- Born: 6 October 1946 (age 79) Managua, Nicaragua
- Height: 176 cm (5 ft 9 in)
- Weight: 89 kg (196 lb)

Sport
- Country: Nicaragua
- Sport: Hammer throw

Achievements and titles
- Personal best: 50.70

Gustavo Morales is a Nicaraguan former Olympic hammer thrower. He represented his country in the men's hammer throw at the 1968 Summer Olympics. His distance was a 45.76. At the 1971 Pan American Games, Morales threw 47.96 m in the hammer throw finishing eighth.

== International competitions ==
Year	Competition	Venue	Position	Event	Notes
Representing Nicaragua
1966	Central American and Caribbean Games	San Juan, Puerto Rico	9th	Hammer throw	44.21 m
1968	Olympic Games	Mexico City, Mexico	21st (q)	Hammer throw	45.76 m
1970	Central American and Caribbean Games	Panama City, Panama	5th	Hammer throw	49.08 m
1971	Central American and Caribbean Championships	Kingston, Jamaica	4th	Hammer throw	48.24 m
1971	Pan American Games	Cali, Colombia	8th	Discus throw	47.96 m
1971	Central American Championships	San José, Costa Rica	1st	Hammer throw	47.34 m
1975	Central American Championships	San José, Costa Rica	2nd	Hammer throw	45.48 m
