= Arnaldo Bristol =

Puerto Rican hurdler (born 1945)

Personal information
- Full name: Arnaldo Bristol Sabater
- Nationality: Puerto Rican
- Born: 11 September 1945 (age 80) Guayama, Puerto Rico

Sport
- Sport: Track and field
- Event: 110 metres hurdles

Arnaldo Bristol Sabater (born September 11, 1945) is a Puerto Rican former track and field athlete who specialized in the 110-meter hurdles and sprint relays during the 1960s and 1970s. Bristol represented Puerto Rico at four consecutive Summer Olympic Games between 1964 and 1976 serving as the nation's flag bearer during the opening ceremony of the 1972 Summer Olympics in Munich. On the regional stage, he achieved multi-medal success at the 1970 Central American and Caribbean Games, getting a silver medal in the 110-meter hurdles and a bronze medal as a member of the 4 × 100-meter relay team.

== Early life and career ==
He was born on 11 September 1945 in Villalba, Puerto Rico.

His Olympic debut was in the 100 meters at the 1964 Summer Olympics, where he finished 6th in Heat 1 of the quarterfinals.

Bristol won the 1966 Drake Relays high hurdle race while representing Texas Southern in 13.6. Then, he competed in the 110m hurdles at the 1966 Central American and Caribbean Games and fell and tripped during the race, though he finished. He also competed in the 4 X 100 m relay, finishing 4th in 40.8 seconds alongside Enrique Montalvo, Héctor González, and Jorge Derieux, behind Jamaica in first place, followed by Trinidad and Tobago and Cuba in second and third place, respectively. He returned to compete in the same sport at the 1968 Summer Olympics, finishing 7th in heat 2 of the quarterfinals.At the 1970 Central American and Caribbean Games, she won a silver medal in 110m hurdles, losing to Juan Morales, and was followed by Guillermo Nunez from Cuba in third place.Then he won a bronze medal in the 4 x 100 m relay at the 1970 Central American and Caribbean Games, alongside Enrique Montalvo, Víctor López, and Jorge Vizcarrondo.

In 1972, representing the Wharton County Junior College Pioneers, Vizcarrondo led the NJCAA championship qualifiers in the men's 100 yards with a time of 9.6 seconds. Bristol was the flag bearer for Puerto Rico in the 1972 Summer Olympics opening ceremony, where he finished in position 6th heat 1 in round 1 from three rounds.

== International competitions ==
Year	Competition	Venue	Position	Event	Notes
Representing Puerto Rico
1962	Ibero-American Games	Madrid, Spain	10th (h)	110 m hurdles	15.5
1964	Olympic Games	Tokyo, Japan	21st (h)	110 m hurdles	14.69
1966	Central American and Caribbean Games	San Juan, Puerto Rico	5th	110 m hurdles	NT
1966	Central American and Caribbean Games	San Juan, Puerto Rico	4th	4 × 100 m relay	40.8
1968	Olympic Games	Mexico City, Mexico	15th (sf)	110 m hurdles	14.13
1970	Central American and Caribbean Games	Panama City, Panama	2nd	110 m hurdles	14.2
1970	Central American and Caribbean Games	Panama City, Panama	3rd	4 × 100 m relay	40.8
1971	Central American and Caribbean Championships	Kingston, Jamaica	2nd	110 m hurdles	13.9
1971	Central American and Caribbean Championships	Kingston, Jamaica	2nd	4 x 100 m relay	40.7
1971	Pan American Games	Cali, Colombia	2nd	110 m hurdles	13.81
1971	Pan American Games	Cali, Colombia	4th	4 × 100 m relay	40.46
1972	Olympic Games	Munich, West Germany	31st (h)	110 m hurdles	14.61
1975	Pan American Games	Cali, Colombia	3rd	110 m hurdles	13.74
1975	Pan American Games	Cali, Colombia	8th	4 × 100 m relay	39.80
1976	Olympic Games	Montreal, Canada	14th (sf)	110 m hurdles	13.98
