= Rafael Pérez (athlete) =

Costa Rican long-distance runner (1946–2019)

Rafael Ángel Pérez
Personal information
- Full name: Juan Rafael Ángel Pérez Cordoba
- Born: 3 July 1946 San José, Costa Rica
- Died: 25 April 2019 (aged 72)
- Height: 1.72 m (5 ft 8 in)
- Weight: 64 kg (141 lb)

Sport
- Sport: Long-distance running
- Event: Marathon

Juan Rafael Ángel Pérez Cordoba (3 July 1946 – 25 April 2019) was a Costa Rican long-distance runner. He competed in three events at the 1968 Summer Olympics: 5000 metres, 10,000 metres and the marathon. In addition, he won multiple medals at regional level.

== International competitions ==
Year	Competition	Venue	Position	Event	Notes
Representing Costa Rica
1968	Central American Championships	Managua, Nicaragua	1st	5000 m	14:54
1968	Central American Championships	Managua, Nicaragua	1st	10,000 m	31:17.5
1968	Olympic Games	Mexico City, Mexico	32nd (h)	5000 m	15:41.4
1968	Olympic Games	Mexico City, Mexico	30th	10,000 m	32:14.6
1968	Olympic Games	Mexico City, Mexico	–	Marathon	DNF
1970	Central American and Caribbean Games	Panama City, Panama	4th	10,000 m	31:03.8
1970	Central American Championships	Guatemala City, Guatemala	1st	1500 m	4:05.2
1970	Central American Championships	Guatemala City, Guatemala	1st	10,000 m	30:51.1
1970	Central American Championships	Guatemala City, Guatemala	1st	Half marathon	1:08
1971	Pan American Games	Cali, Colombia	7th	10,000 m	30:54.13
1971	Central American Championships	San José, Costa Rica	1st	5000 m	15:06.5
1971	Central American Championships	San José, Costa Rica	1st	10,000 m	30:02.2
1972	Central American Championships	Panama City, Panama	1st	1500 m	3:54.4
1972	Central American Championships	Panama City, Panama	1st	5000 m	15:17.8
1973	Central American Games	Guatemala City, Guatemala	1st	5000 m	15:05.2
1973	Central American Games	Guatemala City, Guatemala	1st	10,000 m	31:17.4
1973	Central American Games	Guatemala City, Guatemala	1st	3000 m s'chase	9:42.8
1974	Central American and Caribbean Games	Santo Domingo, Dominican Republic	2nd	10,000 m	30:41.0
1974	Saint Silvester Road Race	São Paulo, Brazil	1st	8.9 km	23:58
1975	Pan American Games	Mexico City, Mexico	5th	10,000 m	30:07.97
1975	Pan American Games	Mexico City, Mexico	8th	Marathon	2:43:10
1975	Central American Championships	San José, Costa Rica	1st	5000 m	14:21.10
1975	Central American Championships	San José, Costa Rica	1st	10,000 m	29:40.90
1977	Central American and Caribbean Championships	Xalapa, Mexico	3rd	10,000 m	30:23.0
1977	Central American and Caribbean Championships	Xalapa, Mexico	1st	Half marathon	1:06:32
1977	Central American Games	San Salvador, El Salvador	1st	10,000 m	32:05.6
1979	Pan American Games	San Juan, Puerto Rico	–	Marathon	DNF

== Personal bests ==
- 5000 metres – 14:04.3 (1974)
- 10,000 metres – 28:48.4 (1976)
- Marathon – 2:16:35 (1982)
