= Pedro Miranda =

Mexican long-distance runner (born 1948)

Personal information
- Full name: Pedro Miranda Noguez
- Born: 2 January 1948 (age 78) Mexico City, Mexico
- Height: 1.72 m (5 ft 8 in)
- Weight: 62 kg (137 lb)

Sport
- Sport: Long-distance running
- Events: 5000 metres, 10,000 metres

Pedro Miranda Noguez (born 2 January 1948) is a Mexican long-distance runner. He competed in the men's 5000 metres at the 1972 Summer Olympics.

== International competitions ==
Year	Competition	Venue	Position	Event	Notes
Representing Mexico
1968	Olympic Games	Mexico City, Mexico	25th (h)	3000 m s'chase	9:25.95
1970	Central American and Caribbean Games	Panama City, Panama	3rd	5000 m	14:25.4
1970	Central American and Caribbean Games	Panama City, Panama	5th	3000 m s'chase	14:25.4
1971	Pan American Games	Cali, Colombia	5th	10,000 m	30:13.16
1972	Olympic Games	Munich, West Germany	24th (h)	5000 m	13:45.2
1972	Olympic Games	Munich, West Germany	21st (h)	10,000 m	28:35.8
1973	Central American and Caribbean Championships	Maracaibo, Venezuela	2nd	10,000 m	29:56.6
1974	Central American and Caribbean Games	Santo Domingo, Dominican Republic	7th	5000 m	14:23.2
1974	Central American and Caribbean Games	Santo Domingo, Dominican Republic	3rd	10,000 m	30:41.2

== Personal bests ==
- 5000 metres – 13:45.10 (1972)
- 10,000 metres – 28:34.6 (1972)
- 3000 metres steeplechase – 9:05.0 (1970)
