= Miguel Núñez (athlete) =

Dominican Republic middle-distance runner

Personal information
- Full name: Miguel Núñez Lima
- Nationality: Dominican
- Born: 1 December 1947 (age 78) Santo Domingo, Dominican Republic
- Height: 1.70 m (5 ft 7 in)

Sport
- Sport: Middle-distance running
- Event: 1500 metres

Miguel Núñez Lima (born 1 December 1947) is a retired Dominican Republic middle-distance runner. He competed in the men's 1500 metres at the 1968 Summer Olympics.

== International competitions ==
Year	Competition	Venue	Position	Event	Notes
Representing the Dominican Republic
1966	Central American and Caribbean Games	San Juan, Puerto Rico	8th (h)	1500 m	NT
1968	Olympic Games	Mexico City, Mexico	51st (h)	1500 m	4:23.67
1970	Central American and Caribbean Games	Panama City, Panama	6th (sf)	800 m	1:56.1
1970	Central American and Caribbean Games	Panama City, Panama	18th (h)	1500 m	4:10.7
