= Alejandro Sánchez (hurdler) =

Mexican hurdler (born 1949)

Personal information
- Full name: Cesare Alejandro Sánchez Ruíz
- Born: 29 June 1949 (age 76) Mexico City, Mexico
- Height: 1.70 m (5 ft 7 in)
- Weight: 56 kg (123 lb)

Sport
- Sport: Track and field
- Event: 400 metres hurdles

Cesare Alejandro Sánchez Ruíz (born 29 June 1949) is a Mexican hurdler. He competed in the men's 400 metres hurdles at the 1968 Summer Olympics.

== International competitions ==
Year	Competition	Venue	Position	Event	Notes
Representing Mexico
1968	Olympic Games	Mexico City, Mexico	22nd (h)	400 m hurdles	51.6
1970	Central American and Caribbean Games	Panama City, Panama	2nd	400 m hurdles	50.6
1970	Central American and Caribbean Games	Panama City, Panama	2nd	4 × 400 m relay	3:07.8
1974	Central American and Caribbean Games	Santo Domingo, Dominican Republic	13th (h)	400 m	49.27
1974	Central American and Caribbean Games	Santo Domingo, Dominican Republic	8th	400 m hurdles	53.78
1974	Central American and Caribbean Games	Santo Domingo, Dominican Republic	6th	4 × 400 m relay	3:18.98

== Personal bests ==
- 400 metres hurdles – 50.6 (1970)
