= 1968 Central American Championships in Athletics =

IV Central American Championships in Athletics
- Dates: March 15–18
- Host city: Managua, Nicaragua
- Venue: Estadio Somoza
- Level: Senior
- Participation: 6 nations

The fourth Central American Championships in Athletics were held at the Estadio Somoza in Managua, Nicaragua, between March 15–18, 1968.

== Participation ==
Athletes from 6 nations participated in the event.

== Medal summary ==
A couple of results could be retrieved from a variety of articles from the archive of Costa Rican newspaper La Nación.

=== Men ===
Event	Gold		Silver		Bronze	
100 metres					Eustace Brice (CRC)	
200 metres						
400 metres						
800 metres	Esteban Valle (NCA)					
1500 metres	Julio Quevedo (GUA)	4:02.3			Luis Gamboa (CRC)	4:12.5
5000 metres	Rafael Ángel Pérez (CRC)	14:54 AR				
10000 metres	Rafael Ángel Pérez (CRC)	31:17.5			Rafael Ángel Sandí (CRC)	32:45.5
Marathon	Carlos Cuque López (GUA)	2:39:12	(GUA)		(GUA)	
3000 metres steeplechase						
110 metres hurdles						
400 metres hurdles						
High jump						
Pole vault	Julio Rossi (PAN)	3.90				
Long jump	Salomón Rowe (GUA)	6.43	Leroy Roper (CRC)	6.24		
Triple jump	David Douglas (GUA)	12.90				
Shot put						
Discus throw						
Hammer throw						
Javelin throw	Donald Vélez (NCA)	55.96				
Pentathlon	Donald Vélez (NCA)		Leroy Roper (CRC)	4334		
20 Kilometres Road Walk						
4 x 100 metres relay	Guatemala					
4 x 400 metres relay						

=== Women ===
Event	Gold		Silver		Bronze	
100 metres	Sandra Johnson (CRC)		Jean Robotham (CRC)			
200 metres	Sandra Johnson (CRC)	26.7	Jean Robotham (CRC)	27.9		
400 metres	Jean Robotham (CRC)	64.5	Miriam Castro (CRC)	65.6		
800 metres	Silvia Molina (GUA)	2:35.8	Sandra Johnson (CRC)	2:35.9		
80 metres hurdles						
High jump						
Long jump					Sandra Johnson (CRC)	4.32
Shot put						
Discus throw			Flory Quesada (CRC)	30.65		
Javelin throw	Mery Streber (NCA)	29.99				
Pentathlon	Silvia Molina (GUA)		Sandra Johnson (CRC)		Jean Robotham (CRC)	
4 x 100 metres relay	Costa Rica; Jean Robotham; Sandra Johnson; Ana Flora Climent; Miriam Castro					

== Medals ==
Costa Rica won a total of 22 medals.

== Team rankings ==
Costa Rica came in third in the team ranking of the men's category. Guatemala won the team ranking of the women's category with 85 points, Costa Rica came in second gaining 84.5 points.
