= Jean Robotham =

Costa Rican sprinter

Personal information
- Full name: Jean Antoinette Robotham Gourzong
- Nationality: Costa Rican
- Born: 13 December 1943 (age 82) Limón, Costa Rica
- Height: 1.55 m (5 ft 1 in)
- Weight: 51 kg (112 lb)

Sport
- Sport: Sprinting
- Event: 400 metres

Jean Robotham (born 13 December 1943) is a Costa Rican sprinter. She competed in the women's 400 metres at the 1968 Summer Olympics. She was 8th in the first round heat and did not advance. She was the first woman to represent Costa Rica at the Olympics.

== International competitions ==
Year	Competition	Venue	Position	Event	Notes
Representing Costa Rica
1968	Central American Championships	Managua, Nicaragua	2nd	100 m	
1968	Central American Championships	Managua, Nicaragua	2nd	200 m	27.9
1968	Central American Championships	Managua, Nicaragua	1st	400 m	64.5
1968	Central American Championships	Managua, Nicaragua	1st	4 x 100 m relay	
1968	Central American Championships	Managua, Nicaragua	3rd	Pentathlon	
1968	Olympic Games	Mexico City, Mexico	29th (h)	400 m	58.2
1968	Olympic Games	Mexico City, Mexico	24th (q)	Long jump	4.75 m
1968	Olympic Games	Mexico City, Mexico	32nd	Pentathlon	2909 pts
1971	Central American Championships	San José, Costa Rica	2nd	100 m hurdles	17.6
1971	Central American Championships	San José, Costa Rica	2nd	4 x 100 m relay	49.8
