= Francisco Sardo =

Mexican sprinter

Personal information
- Full name: Francisco Javier Sardo Olmedo
- Born: 12 November 1949 (age 76) Mazatlán, Mexico
- Height: 1.76 m (5 ft 9 in)
- Weight: 64 kg (141 lb)

Sport
- Sport: Sprinting
- Event: 400 metres

Francisco Javier Sardo Olmedo (born 12 November 1949) is a Mexican sprinter. He competed in the men's 4 × 400 metres relay at the 1968 Summer Olympics.

== International competitions ==
Year	Competition	Venue	Position	Event	Notes
Representing Mexico
1968	Olympic Games	Mexico City, Mexico	14th (h)	4 × 400 m relay	3:08.19
1970	Central American and Caribbean Games	Panama City, Panama	8th (sf)	400 m	47.6
1970	Central American and Caribbean Games	Panama City, Panama	2nd	4 × 400 m relay	3:07.8

== Personal bests ==
- 400 metres – 46.3 (1969)
