= Melesio Piña =

Mexican sprinter

Personal information
- Full name: Melesio Piña Oregel
- Born: 12 February 1948 (age 78) Tepic, Mexico
- Height: 1.74 m (5 ft 9 in)
- Weight: 64 kg (141 lb)

Sport
- Sport: Sprinting
- Event: 400 metres

Melesio Piña Oregel (born 12 February 1948) is a retired Mexican sprinter. He competed in the men's 400 metres at the 1968 Summer Olympics.

== International competitions ==
Year	Competition	Venue	Position	Event	Notes
Representing Mexico
1968	Olympic Games	Mexico City, Mexico	32nd (h)	400 m	46.81
1968	Olympic Games	Mexico City, Mexico	14th (h)	4 × 400 m relay	3:08.19
1970	Central American and Caribbean Games	Panama City, Panama	6th (sf)	200 m	21.4^{1}
1970	Central American and Caribbean Games	Panama City, Panama	2nd	400 m	46.9
1970	Central American and Caribbean Games	Panama City, Panama	2nd	4 × 400 m relay	3:07.8
1971	Central American and Caribbean Championships	Kingston, Jamaica	2nd	400 m	47.4
1971	Pan American Games	Cali, Colombia	8th (sf)	400 m	47.74
1971	Pan American Games	Cali, Colombia	8th (h)	4 × 400 m relay	3:17.8

^{1}Did not start in the final

== Personal bests ==
- 400 metres – 46.1 (1969)
