= Galdino Flores =

Mexican sprinter (1942–2025)

Personal information
- Full name: Galdino Flores Valles
- Born: 18 April 1942 Puebla, Mexico
- Died: 6 November 2025 (aged 83)
- Height: 1.76 m (5 ft 9 in)
- Weight: 63 kg (139 lb)

Sport
- Sport: Athletics
- Event: Long jump

Galdino Flores Valles (18 April 1942 - 6 November 2025) was a Mexican sprinter and long jumper who competed in the men's 4 × 100 metres relay at the 1968 Summer Olympics. He died on 6 November 2025, aged 83.

== International competitions ==
Year	Competition	Venue	Position	Event	Notes
Representing Mexico
1968	Olympic Games	Mexico City, Mexico	15th (h)	4 × 100 m relay	40.0 s
1968	Olympic Games	Mexico City, Mexico	21st (q)	Long jump	7.59 m
1970	Central American and Caribbean Games	Panama City, Panama	3rd	Long jump	7.43 m
1970	Central American and Caribbean Games	Panama City, Panama	7th	Decathlon	6234 pts

== Personal bests ==
- Long jump – 7.67 (1968)
