= 1975 Central American Championships in Athletics =

VIII Central American Championships in Athletics
- Dates: November 26–29
- Host city: San José, Costa Rica
- Venue: Estadio Nacional
- Level: Senior
- Events: 36
- Participation: 5 nations

The eighth Central American Championships in Athletics were held at the Estadio Nacional in San José, Costa Rica, between November 26–29, 1975.

A total of 36 events were contested.

== Medal summary ==
Some results and medal winners could be reconstructed from the archive of Costa Rican newspaper La Nación.

=== Men ===
| Event | Gold | | Silver | | Bronze | |
|---|---|---|---|---|---|---|
| 100 metres | Irving Weeks (PAN) | 10.5 | Carlos Jiménez (CRC) | 10.6 | Ricardo Dewitt (CRC) | 10.6 |
| 200 metres | | | | | | |
| 400 metres | | | | | | |
| 800 metres | Venancio Ponce (HON) | | Jesús Salazar (CRC) | | Rafael Fonseca (CRC) | |
| 1500 metres | Venancio Ponce (HON) | 4:06.0 | Edgar Fournier (CRC) | 4:09.2 | Róger Zúñiga (CRC) | 4:12.4 |
| 5000 metres | Rafael Ángel Pérez (CRC) | 14:21.10 | | | | |
| 10,000 metres | Rafael Ángel Pérez (CRC) | 29:40.90 | | | | |
| Marathon | Rafael Ángel Sandí (CRC) | 2:36:30 | Hugo Vargas (CRC) | 2:38:13 | Félix González (ESA) | 2:44:06 |
| 110 metres hurdles | | | | | | |
| 400 metres hurdles | Rafael Fonseca (CRC) | 55.6 | Silvio Larios (NCA) | 59.9 | Walter Salazar (CRC) | 67. |
| 3000 metres steeplechase | | | | | | |
| 4 x 100 metres relay | | | | | | |
| 4 x 400 metres relay | El Salvador | 3:22.3 | Nicaragua | 3:24.1 | Costa Rica | 3:27.4 |
| 20 Kilometres Road Walk | Hipólito López (HON) | 1:47:52 | César Argüello (NCA) | 1:51:42 | Adolfo Vanegas (HON) | 1:52:10 |
| High jump | Roberto McFarlane (CRC) | 1.90 | Arnoldo Monge (CRC) | 1.83 | Julio Cedeño (PAN) | |
| Pole vault | | | | | | |
| Long jump | | | | | | |
| Triple jump | | | | | | |
| Shot put | E. Montiel (NCA) | 14.49 | Roberto Ibáñez (PAN) | 14.42 | Iván Turcios (NCA) | 13.40 |
| Discus throw | | | | | | |
| Hammer throw | René Lichi (PAN) | 46.62 | Gustavo Morales (NCA) | 45.48 | Francisco Argüello (NCA) | 44.60 |
| Javelin throw | Eustacio de Léon (PAN) | 64.45 | Donald Vélez (NCA) | 61.12 | Rodolfo Méndez (PAN) | 60.01 |
| Decathlon | | | | | | |

=== Women ===
| Event | Gold | | Silver | | Bronze | |
|---|---|---|---|---|---|---|
| 100 metres | Campbell (CRC) | 12.1 | Sandra Johnson (CRC) | 12.1 | (NCA) | |
| 200 metres | | | | | | |
| 400 metres | | | | | | |
| 800 metres | Thelma Zúñiga (CRC) | 2:16.4 CR | Maritza Garita (CRC) | 2:24.7 | Eleonora Rodríguez (ESA) | 2:28.7 |
| 1500 metres | Thelma Zúñiga (CRC) | 4:52 | Myriam Benavides (CRC) | 5:22 | Zumara Larios (NCA) | 5:22 |
| 100 metres hurdles | | | | | | |
| 4 x 100 metres relay | Costa Rica; Sandra Johnson; Myriam Benavides; Maritza Murillo; Thelma Zúñiga | 4:09.1 | Nicaragua | 4:16.1 | El Salvador | 4:27.5 |
| High jump | | | | | | |
| Long jump | Rusel Carrero (NCA) | 4.88 | Elizabeth Aguilar (CRC) | 4.19 | Teresita Murillo (CRC) | 4.01 |
| Shot put | | | | | | |
| Discus throw | Ilse Sobrado (CRC) | 28.69 | Gené Clark (CRC) | 27.71 | Cinthia Porras (NCA) | 27.67 |
| Javelin throw | Marta Velázquez (NCA) | 35.48 | Aida Wilson (CRC) | 32.24 | Gené Clark (CRC) | 30.95 |
| Pentathlon | Rusel Carrero (NCA) | 2595 | Elizabeth Aguilar (CRC) | 2100 | Teresita Murillo (CRC) | 2075 |

== Medal table ==
A medal table was published.

* Host nation (Costa Rica)

| Rank | Nation | Gold | Silver | Bronze | Total |
|---|---|---|---|---|---|
| 1 | Costa Rica (CRC)* | 18 | 18 | 13 | 49 |
| 2 | Nicaragua (NIC) | 6 | 9 | 14 | 29 |
| 3 | Panama (PAN) | 6 | 4 | 4 | 14 |
| 4 | El Salvador (ESA) | 3 | 3 | 4 | 10 |
| 5 | Honduras (HON) | 3 | 2 | 1 | 6 |
| Totals (5 entries) | | 36 | 36 | 36 | 108 |

== Team Rankings ==
Costa Rica won the overall team ranking, the team ranking in the men's category and in the women's category

=== Total ===
The host country is highlighted in lavender blue

| Rank | Nation | Points |
|---|---|---|
| 1st place, gold medalist(s) | Costa Rica | 334 |
| 2nd place, silver medalist(s) | Nicaragua | 207 |
| 3rd place, bronze medalist(s) | (Panama) Panamá | 90 |
| 4 | El Salvador | 76 |
| 5 | Honduras | 46 |

=== Male ===
The host country is highlighted in lavender blue

| Rank | Nation | Points |
|---|---|---|
| 1st place, gold medalist(s) | Costa Rica | 185 |
| 2nd place, silver medalist(s) | Nicaragua | 112 |
| 3rd place, bronze medalist(s) | (Panama) Panamá | 81 |
| 4 | El Salvador | 44 |
| 4 | Honduras | 44 |

=== Female ===
The host country is highlighted in lavender blue

| Rank | Nation | Points |
|---|---|---|
| 1st place, gold medalist(s) | Costa Rica | 149 |
| 2nd place, silver medalist(s) | Nicaragua | 95 |
| 3rd place, bronze medalist(s) | El Salvador | 32 |
| 4 | (Panama) Panamá | 9 |
| 5 | Honduras | 2 |
