= Hipólito López =

Honduran long-distance runner

Personal information
- Nationality: Honduran
- Born: 7 February 1952 (age 74)
- Height: 1.65 m (5 ft 5 in)
- Weight: 57 kg (126 lb)

Sport
- Sport: Long-distance running, race walking
- Event: Marathon

Hipólito López (born 7 February 1952) is a Honduran former race walker turned long-distance runner. He competed in the marathon at the 1976 Summer Olympics. He finished eighth in the 10000 metres at the 1975 Pan American Games.

== International competitions ==
Year	Competition	Venue	Position	Event	Notes
Representing Honduras
1971	Central American Championships	San José, Costa Rica	3rd	5000 m	16:11.1
1971	Central American Championships	San José, Costa Rica	1st	20 km walk	
1972	Central American Championships	Panama City, Panama	1st	20 km walk	1:56
1973	Central American Games	Guatemala City, Guatemala	1st	50 km walk	5:35:29
1974	Central American and Caribbean Games	Santo Domingo, Dominican Republic	6th	20 km walk	1:46:52
1975	Pan American Games	Mexico City, Mexico	9th	5000 m	15:56.16
1975	Pan American Games	Mexico City, Mexico	8th	10,000 m	32:22.13
1975	Pan American Games	Mexico City, Mexico	9th	3000 m s'chase	10:12.00
1975	Central American Championships	San José, Costa Rica	1st	20 km walk	1:47:52
1976	Olympic Games	Montreal, Canada	41st	Marathon	2:26:00
1979	Pan American Games	San Juan, Puerto Rico	13th	Marathon	2:43:08

== Personal bests ==
- Marathon – 2:26:00 (1976)
