= 1972 Central American Championships in Athletics =

VII Central American Championships in Athletics
- Dates: November 24-26
- Host city: Panama City, Panama
- Venue: Estadio Revolución
- Level: Senior

The seventh Central American Championships in Athletics were held at the Estadio Revolución in Ciudad de Panamá, Panamá, between November 24-26, 1972.

== Medal summary ==
Some results and medal winners could be reconstructed from the archive of Costa Rican newspaper La Nación.

=== Men ===
Event	Gold		Silver		Bronze	
100 metres						
200 metres						
400 metres						
800 metres						
1500 metres	Rafael Ángel Pérez (CRC)	3:54.4	Julio Quevedo (GUA)	3:56.5	Luís Gamboa (CRC)	3:59.1
5000 metres	Rafael Ángel Pérez (CRC)	15:17.8	Clovis Morales (HON)	15:22.5	Gonzao Bonilla (CRC)	15:26.9
10,000 metres						
Marathon						
110 metres hurdles						
400 metres hurdles	Milwood Amos (PAN)	52.6	(PAN)		Santiago Vargas (CRC)	58.9
3000 metres steeplechase						
4 x 100 metres relay	Panama		Costa Rica	42.8	Guatemala	43.1
4 x 400 metres relay						
20 Kilometres Road Walk	Hipólito López (HON)	1:56	Raúl Ianza (HON)	1:58	Oscar Díaz (ESA)	1:59
High jump						
Pole vault						
Long jump	Salomón Rowe (GUA)	7.10	(PAN)		Martín Douglas (CRC)	6.69
Triple jump						
Shot put	Mauricio Jubis (ESA)	13.06	(PAN)		(PAN)	
Discus throw	Joaquín Rodas (ESA)	39.71	Eduardo Hasbun (ESA)	38.98	Mauricio Jubis (ESA)	38.96
Hammer throw						
Javelin throw						
Pentathlon						

=== Women ===
Event	Gold		Silver		Bronze	
100 metres						
200 metres						
400 metres						
800 metres						
1500 metres	Rosalía Abadía (PAN)	5:05.2	Silvia Molina (GUA)	5:05.7	(PAN)	
100 metres hurdles						
4 x 100 metres relay	Panama; Martínez; Diva Bishop; Clotilde Morales; Rosalía Abadía	46.8	Costa Rica	51.7	El Salvador	52.5
High jump	Diva Bishop (PAN)	1.44	(PAN)		Flora Torres (ESA)	1.35
Long jump						
Shot put						
Discus throw	Marta Ramos (ESA)	11.71	(PAN)		Celia de Martínez (GUA)	10.12
Hammer throw						
Javelin throw	Gené Clark (CRC)	32.00	(PAN)		Evelina Mona (ESA)	30.26
Pentathlon						

== Medal table (after two days) ==
The table below displays the medal count after 2 of 3 competition days.

* Host nation (Panama)

Rank	Nation	Gold	Silver	Bronze	Total
1	Panama (PAN)*	12	13	9	34
2	Costa Rica (CRC)	3	2	4	9
3	El Salvador (ESA)	3	1	5	9
4	Guatemala (GUA)	1	2	2	5
5	Honduras (HON)	1	2	0	3
Totals (5 entries)		20	20	20	60
