= Mauricio Jubis =

Salvadoran athletics competitor

Personal information
- Nationality: Salvadoran
- Born: 2 December 1945 Santa Ana
- Died: September 24, 2024 (aged 78)
- Height: 1.85 m (6 ft 1 in)
- Weight: 102 kg (225 lb)

Sport
- Sport: Athletics
- Events: Shot put Discus

Mauricio Jubis (December 2, 1945 – September 24, 2024) was a Salvadoran athlete. He competed in the men's shot put and the men's discus throw at the 1968 Summer Olympics.

== International competitions ==
Year	Competition	Venue	Position	Event	Notes
Representing El Salvador
1968	Olympic Games	Mexico City, Mexico	19th (q)	Shot put	12.92 m
1968	Olympic Games	Mexico City, Mexico	27th (q)	Discus throw	36.18 m
1971	Central American Championships	San José, Costa Rica	1st	Shot put	13.47 m
1972	Central American Championships	Panama City, Panama	1st	Shot put	13.06 m
1972	Central American Championships	Panama City, Panama	3rd	Discus throw	38.96 m
1973	Central American Games	Guatemala City, Guatemala	2nd	Shot put	
1974	Central American and Caribbean Games	Santo Domingo, Dominican Republic	10th	Shot put	13.37 m
1974	Central American and Caribbean Games	Santo Domingo, Dominican Republic	14th	Discus throw	38.12 m

== Personal bests ==
- Shot put – 14.46 (1973)
- Discus throw – 41.90 (1973)
