= Athletics at the 1971 Pan American Games – Men's 5000 metres =

Men's 5000 metres at the Pan American Games

The men's 5000 metres event at the 1971 Pan American Games was held in Cali on 2 August.

== Results ==
Rank	Name	Nationality	Time	Notes
1st place, gold medalist(s)	Steve Prefontaine	United States	13:52.53	
2nd place, silver medalist(s)	Steve Stageburg	United States	14:00.76	
3rd place, bronze medalist(s)	Mario Pérez	Mexico	14:03.98	
4	Edmundo Warnke	Chile	14:05.57	
5	Juan Máximo Martínez	Mexico	14:14.38	
6	Víctor Mora	Colombia	14:25.17	
7	Victoriano López	Guatemala	14:38.55	
8	Héctor Ortiz	Puerto Rico	14:45.77	
9	Carlos Alberto Alves	Brazil	14:47.93	
10	Domingo Tibaduiza	Colombia	14:58.67	
11	José Antonio Bordón	Cuba	15:07.4	
12	Robert Legge	Canada	15:13.4	
13	Lucirio Garrido	Venezuela	15:27.5	
14	Carlos Cuque López	Guatemala	15:46.9	
