= List of Central American and Caribbean Games records in athletics =

The Central American and Caribbean Games is a quadrennial event which began in 1926. The Games records in athletics are set by athletes who are representing one of the Centro Caribe Sports member federations. Both the initial records and the records broken in 2010 can be found on the official Games webpage.

Records for defunct events were assembled from the gbrathletics website. Wind info, relay teams and results for combined events for early competitions can be found on the CACAC webpage.

== Men's records ==
Event	Record	Athlete	Nationality	Date	Meet	Place	Ref.
100 m	10.00 (+0.5 m/s)	Cejhae Greene	Antigua and Barbuda	29 July 2018	2018 Games	Barranquilla, Colombia	
200 m	19.76 (+2.0 m/s)	José Figueroa	Puerto Rico	5 August 2026	2026 Games	Santo Domingo, Dominican Republic	
400 m	44.27	Alberto Juantorena	Cuba	16 July 1978	1978 Medellín		
800 m	1:45.15	Alberto Juantorena	Cuba	11 August 1982	1982 Games	Havana, Cuba	
1500 m	3:41.84	Eduardo Castro	Mexico	9 August 1982	1982 Games	Havana, Cuba	
5000 m	13:44.41	Juan Luis Barrios	Mexico	30 July 2010	2010 Games	Mayagüez, Puerto Rico	
10,000 m	28:36.67	Pablo Olmedo	Mexico	1 December 2002	2002 Games	San Salvador, El Salvador	
Half marathon	1:03:50	Alberto Gonzalez	Guatemala	2 July 2023	2023 Games	San Salvador, El Salvador	
Marathon	2:14:23	Benjamín Paredes	Mexico	28 November 1993	1993 Ponce		
110 m hurdles	13.12 (+0.7 m/s)	Dayron Robles	Cuba	26 July 2006	2006 Games	Cartagena, Colombia	
400 m hurdles	47.60	Kyron McMaster	British Virgin Islands	31 July 2018	2018 Games	Barranquilla, Colombia	
3000 m steeplechase	8:38.43	Rubén García	Mexico	28 November 1993	1993 Ponce		
High jump	2.37 m	Javier Sotomayor	Cuba	20 August 1998	1998 Maracaibo		
Pole vault	5.60 m	Giovanni Lanaro	Mexico	27 July 2010	2010 Games	Mayagüez, Puerto Rico	
Long jump	8.45 m (−0.1 m/s)	Iván Pedroso	Cuba	17 August 1998	1998 Games	Maracaibo, Venezuela	
Triple jump	17.51 m (+1.3 m/s)	Lázaro Martínez	Cuba	7 July 2023	2023 Games	San Salvador, El Salvador	
Shot put	21.02 m	O'Dayne Richards	Jamaica	30 July 2018	2018 Games	Barranquilla, Colombia	
Discus throw	70.20 m	Luis Delís	Cuba	8 August 1982	1982 Games	Havana, Cuba	
Hammer throw	74.95 m	Diego del Real	Mexico	31 July 2018	2018 Games	Barranquilla, Colombia	
Javelin throw	84.91m	Guillermo Martínez	Cuba	25 July 2006	2006 Games	Cartagena, Colombia	
Decathlon	8281 pts	Ayden Owens-Delerme	Puerto Rico	3–4 July 2023	2023 Games	San Salvador, El Salvador	
Decathlon	100m (wind) / Long jump (wind) / Shot put / High jump / 400m / 110m H (wind) / Discus / Pole vault / Javelin / 1500m; 10.36 (+0.4 m/s) / 7.54 m (−1.1 m/s) / 13.88 m / 2.01 m / 47.19 / 13.85 (−2.0 m/s) / 43.40 m / 4.60 m / 56.62 m / 4:46.57						
20 km walk (road)	1:22:32	Eder Sánchez	Mexico	24 July 2010	2010 Games	Mayagüez, Puerto Rico	
50 km walk (road)	3:49:40 A	Érick Barrondo	Guatemala	29 November 2014	2014 Games	Xalapa, Mexico	
4 × 100 m relay	37.98 NR	Franquelo Pérez; Yohandris Andújar; Melbin Marcelino; Yancarlos Martínez	Dominican Republic	6 August 2026	2026 Games	Santo Domingo, Dominican Republic	
4 × 400 m relay	3:00.70 A	William Collazo; Raidel Acea; Osmaidel Pellicier; Yoandys Lescay	Cuba	28 November 2014	2014 Games	Xalapa, Mexico	

Key:
^{WR} World record	^{AR} North American, Central American and Caribbean record	^{NR} National record	^{A} affected by altitude

== Women's records ==
Event	Record	Athlete	Nationality	Date	Meet	Place	Ref.
100 m	11.10 (−0.7 m/s)	Liranyi Alonso	Dominican Republic	3 August 2026	2026 Games	Santo Domingo, Dominican Republic	
200 m	22.69 (+1.1 m/s)	Cydonie Mothersill	Cayman Islands	27 July 2010	2010 Games	Mayagüez, Puerto Rico	
400 m	49.95	Marileidy Paulino	Dominican Republic	6 July 2023	2023 Games	San Salvador, El Salvador	
800 m	1:59.00	Ana Fidelia Quirot	Cuba	3 July 1986	1986 Santiago		
1500 m	4:10.39	Joselyn Brea	Venezuela	6 July 2023	2023 Games	San Salvador, El Salvador	
5000 m	15:10.60	Joselyn Brea	Venezuela	3 July 2023	2023 Games	San Salvador, El Salvador	
10,000 m	33:41.48	Úrsula Sánchez	Mexico	29 July 2018	2018 Games	Barranquilla, Colombia	
Half marathon	1:15:04	Joselyn Brea	Venezuela	2 July 2023	2023 Games	San Salvador, El Salvador	
Marathon	2:41:16	Margarita Hernández	Mexico	29 November 2014	2014 Games	Xalapa, Mexico	
100 m hurdles	12.60 (±0.0 m/s)	Jasmine Camacho-Quinn	Puerto Rico	4 July 2023	2023 Games	San Salvador, El Salvador	
400 m hurdles	54.30	Deon Hemmings	Jamaica	19 August 1998	1998 Games	Maracaibo, Venezuela	
3000 m steeplechase	9:59.03	Beverly Ramos	Puerto Rico	30 July 2010	2010 Games	Mayagüez, Puerto Rico	
High jump	1.97 m	Juana Arrendel	Dominican Republic	2 December 2002	2002 Games	San Salvador, El Salvador	
Pole vault	4.70 m	Yarisley Silva	Cuba	29 July 2018	2018 Games	Barranquilla, Colombia	
Long jump	6.86 m (+1.6 m/s)	Natalia Linares	Colombia	3 July 2023	2023 Games	San Salvador, El Salvador	
Triple jump	15.16 m (+1.1 m/s)	Yulimar Rojas	Venezuela	5 July 2023	2023 Games	San Salvador, El Salvador	
Shot put	19.36 m	María Elena Sarría	Cuba	12 August 1982	1982 Games	Havana, Cuba	
Discus throw	66.00 m	Yaime Pérez	Cuba	31 July 2018	2018 Games	Barranquilla, Colombia	
Hammer throw	71.62 m	Rosa Rodríguez	Venezuela	3 July 2023	2023 Games	San Salvador, El Salvador	
Javelin throw	67.34 m	Flor Ruiz	Colombia	4 August 2026	2026 Games	Santo Domingo, Dominican Republic	
Heptathlon	6436 pts	Yorgelis Rodríguez	Cuba	31 July – 1 August 2018	2018 Games	Barranquilla, Colombia	
Heptathlon	100m H (wind) / High jump / Shot put / 200m (wind) / Long jump (wind) / Javelin / 800m; 13.60 (+2.3) / 1.83 m / 14.23 m / 24.56 (+0.1) / 6.23 m (+1.9) / 48.96 m / 2:15.50						
20 km walk (road)	1:35:43 A	Mirna Ortiz	Guatemala	23 November 2014	2014 Games	Xalapa, Mexico	
4 × 100 m relay	43.29	Virgen Benavides; Misleydis Lazo; Roxana Díaz; Anay Tejeda	Cuba	29 July 2006	2006 Games	Cartagena, Colombia	
4 × 400 m relay	3:26.08	Zurian Hechavarría; Rose Almanza; Lisneidy Veitia; Roxana Gomez	Cuba	7 July 2023	2023 Games	San Salvador, El Salvador	

== Mixed ==
Event	Record	Athlete	Nationality	Date	Meet	Place	Ref.
4 × 400 m relay	3:14.81	Alexander Ogando; Fiordaliza Cofil; Franshina Martínez; Lidio Andrés Feliz; Anabel Medina	Dominican Republic	3 July 2023	2023 Games	San Salvador, El Salvador	

Key:
^{WR} World record	^{AR} North American, Central American and Caribbean record	^{NR} National record	^{A} affected by altitude

== Records in defunct events ==
=== Men's events ===
Event	Record	Name	Nation	Date	Meet	Place	Ref.
10 km (road)	36:05 A	Tomás Zafiro	Mexico	1926	1926 Games	Mexico City, Mexico	
Pentathlon	3459 pts	Salvador Torrós	Puerto Rico	1938	1938 Panamá		
10,000 m walk (track)	51:32.4	José Pedraza	Mexico	1966	1966 San Juan		

=== Women's events ===
Event	Record	Name	Nation	Date	Meet	Place	Ref.
50 m	6.4 h	Dolores Worrell	Panama	1946	1946 Barranquilla		
3000 m	9:16.27	Isabel Juárez	Mexico	November 1993	1993 Ponce		
80 metres hurdles	11.1 h	Bertha Díaz	Cuba	August 1962	1962 Kingston		
80 metres hurdles	11.1 h	Carmen Smith	Jamaica	July 1966	1966 San Juan		
Pentathlon	4534 pts	Marlene Elejalde	Cuba	March 1970	1970 Panamá		
10,000 m walk (track)	46:30.16	Graciela Mendoza	Mexico	August 1998	1998 Games	Maracaibo, Venezuela	

== See also ==
List of Central American and Caribbean records in athletics
