= Miguel Núñez (theologian) =

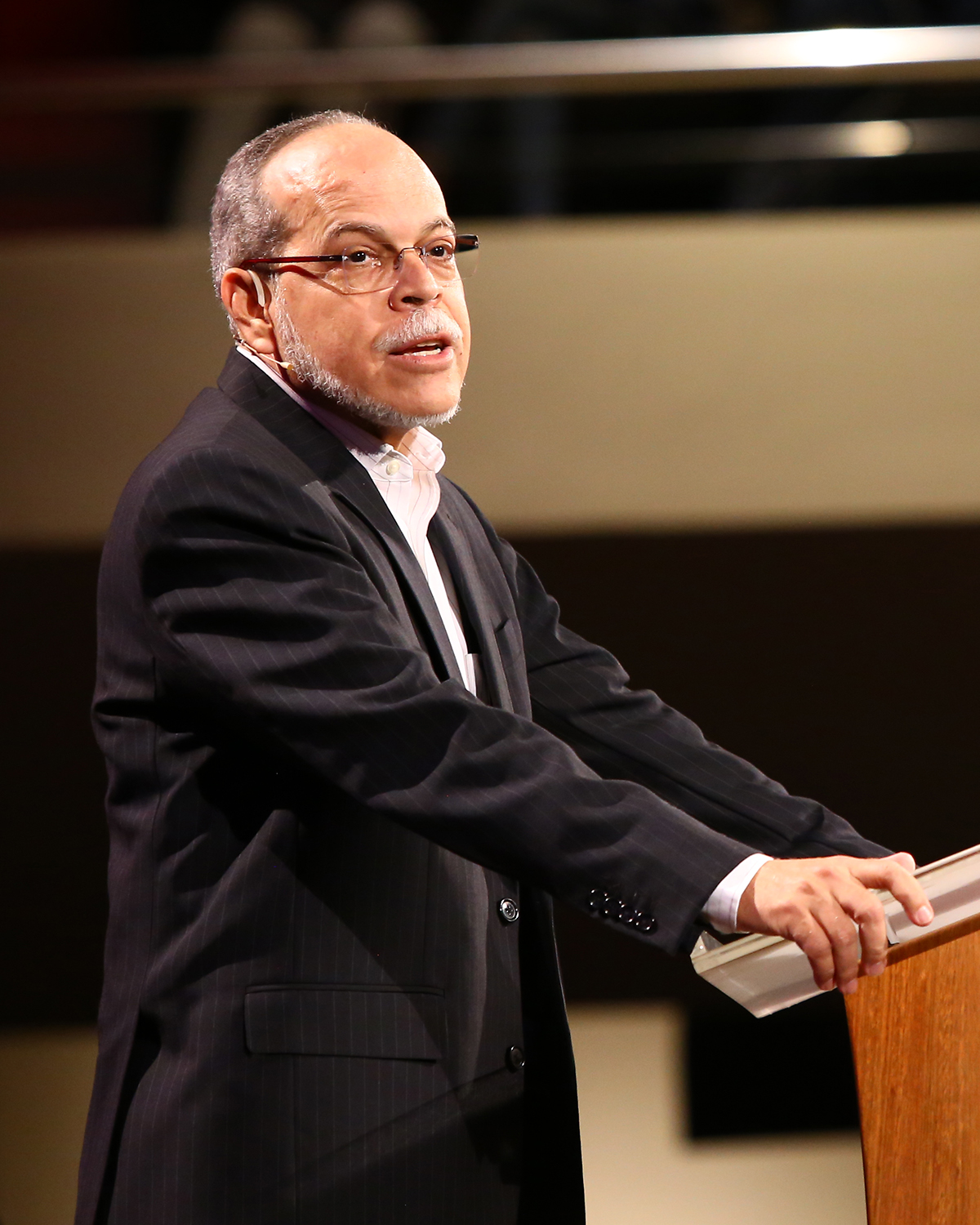
- Born: Miguel De Jesús Núñez Salcedo; July 5, 1958 (age 67); Santo Domingo, Dominican Republic
- Education: Santo Domingo Institute of Technology (INTEC) (M.D., 1980) Southern Baptist School for Biblical Studies (Th.M, 2010) Southern Baptist Theological Seminary (DMin, 2014)
- Occupations: Author; Doctor; Pastor
- Spouse: Catherine Scheraldi

Dr. Miguel Núñez (born July 5, 1958) is a Dominican–American doctor, author, speaker and founder of Wisdom & Integrity Ministries. Núñez is a practicing doctor with specializations in Internal medicine and Infectious Diseases and Head Pastor of the International Baptist Church(IBI) in Santo Domingo, Dominican Republic.

He is the author and creator of the podcast, "No es tan simple como parece" (It's Not as Simple as it Seems) and of the television program, "Respuestas: Verdades Absolutas para un Mundo Relativo” (Answers: Absolute Truths for a Relative World). Alongside Wisdom & Integrity Ministries, Pastor Núñez hosts the “Por Su Causa” conference every year.

Núñez is a Council Member in Gospel Coalition(TGC) and a member of the Concilio de Masculinidad y Feminidad Bíblica (CBMW). He is also vice president of “Coalición por el Evangelio", Strategy Director for Latin America in the Southern Baptist Theological Seminary, and—since 2016—associate professor of Pastoral Leadership.

Miguel Núñez lives in Santo Domingo and has been married for 35-year to Dr. Catherine Scheraldi, who also practices medicine with a specialization in Endocrinology.

== Education ==
Dr. Núñez graduated from the School of Medicine in the Santo Domingo Institute of Technology in 1980 and coursed his specialties in Internal Medicine from 1982 to 1985 in Englewood Hospital and Medical Center and in Infectious Diseases from 1985 to 1987 in the New York School of Medicine. He practiced medicine in the U.S. for 15 years and was a clinical professor in the Mount Sinai School of Medicine in New York, which is now known as the Icahn School of Medicine at Mount Sinai.

In 2010, Núñez completed his master's degree in Theology (ThM) in the Southern Baptist School for Biblical Studies and in 2014 completed his Dmin in the Southern Baptist Theological Seminary.

== Selected publications ==
- Co-author de Seguirazgo: The act of following and leading simultaneously. (May 30, 2010)
- Enseñanzas que transformaron el mundo: Un llamado a despertar para la iglesia en Latino América (September 23, 2015)
- Vivir con integridad y sabiduría: Persigue los valores que la sociedad ha perdido (September 6, 2016)
- El Poder de la Palabra para Transformar una Nación: Un llamado bíblico e histórico a la iglesia latinoamericana (17 de February 17, 2017)
- ¡Latinoamérica despierta!: 95 tesis para la iglesia de hoy (November 15, 2017)
- Siervos para su Gloria: antes de hacer tienes que ser (January 16, 2018)
- Jesús: el hombre que desafió al mundo y confronta tu vida (January 29, 2018)
- Una iglesia conforme al corazón de Dios 2da edición: Cómo la iglesia puede reflejar la gloria de Dios (July 1, 2018)
- Co-author de Revolución Sexual (October 1, 2018) junto a su esposa, Catherine Scheraldi.
- De pastores y predicadores (May 15, 2019)
- Co-conductor del programa de televisión Respuestas: Verdades Absolutas para un Mundo Relativo.
