= Brenda Walsh (sprinter) =

Canadian sprinter and middle-distance runner

Personal information
- Nationality: Canadian
- Born: 31 December 1952 (age 73) Edmonton, Canada

Sport
- Sport: Athletics
- Event: 400m
- Club: University of Alberta Golden Bears
Medal record
Representing Canada
Women's Athletics
British Commonwealth Games
Bronze medal – third place	1974 Christchurch	4 x 400 m relay

Brenda Walsh (born 31 December 1952) is a Canadian former sprinter and middle-distance runner.

== Biography ==
Walsh finished second behind Jannette Roscoe in the 400 metres event at the British 1971 WAAA Championships. At the 1971 Pan American Games she placed fifth in the 400 metres.

Walsh was the 1973 US indoor champion in the 440 yards.

At the 1974 British Commonwealth Games she won bronze in the 4 × 400 m relay. In the 400 metres she was eliminated in the heat, and in the 800 metres she was a semi-finalist.
