= Juan Argüello =

Nicaraguan sprinter

Personal information
- Born: 8 March 1947 Managua, Nicaragua
- Died: 27 February 2023 (aged 75) Managua, Nicaragua

Sport
- Sport: Sprinting
- Events: 100 metres, 200 metres

Juan Argüello Sandoval (8 March 1947 – 27 February 2023) was a Nicaraguan sprinter. Argüello would compete at the 1968 Summer Olympics, representing Nicaragua in men's athletics. He would be one of the first athletes to represent the nation at an Olympic Games as they would make their debut at this edition.

He first competed in the men's 100 metres though placed last in his heat and did not advance to the quarterfinals of the event. He then competed in the men's 200 metres and again placed last in his heat with a personal best time.

== Biography ==
Juan Argüello Sandoval was born on 8 March 1947 in Managua, Nicaragua. Argüello would compete at the 1968 Summer Olympics in Mexico City, Mexico, representing Nicaragua in two men's athletics events. He would be one of the first Nicaraguan athletics competitors and one of the first Nicaraguan sportspeople overall to compete at an Olympic Games, as the nation would make its official debut at the Olympic Games at this edition of the competition.

Argüello would first compete in the heats of the men's 100 metres on 13 October. He would compete in heat nine against seven other athletes. There, he would place last in his heat with a time of 11.18 seconds and would not advance further to the quarterfinals of the event. Two days later, he would compete in the heats of the men's 200 metres on 15 October. He would compete in heat four against six other competitors. There, he would again place last in his heat, recording a time of 22.80 seconds. Although he did not advance to the quarterfinals, he recorded a new personal best in the event.
