= Athletics at the 1970 Central American and Caribbean Games =

Athletics at the XI CAC Games
- Dates: 1–8 March 1970
- Host city: Panama City, Panama
- Venue: Estadio Revolución
- Events: 35
- Participation: 18 nations
- Records set: 29 GR

The athletics competition in the 1970 Central American and Caribbean Games were held at the Estadio Revolución in Panama City, Panama.

Beginning with this edition, men's pentathlon was replaced with the decathlon. It was also the first edition to hold the following women's events: 400 metres, 800 metres and the pentathlon. Women's 80 metres hurdles was replaced by 100 metres hurdles.

== Medal summary ==
=== Men's events ===
Event	Gold		Silver		Bronze	
100 metres (wind: +1.4 m/s)	Pablo Montes; Cuba	10.24 GR	Hermes Ramírez; Cuba	10.28	Michael Fray; Jamaica	10.45
200 metres (wind: -3.0 m/s)	Pablo Montes; Cuba	21.2	Germán Solís; Cuba	21.3	Hermes Ramírez; Cuba	21.4
400 metres	Antonio Álvarez; Cuba	46.6	Melesio Piña; Mexico	46.9	Misael Curiel; Venezuela	47.1
800 metres	Herminio Isaac; Puerto Rico	1:49.8 GR	Ricardo Bailey; Panama	1:49.9	Donaldo Arza; Panama	1:50.3
1500 metres	Byron Dyce; Jamaica	3:45.8 GR	Donaldo Arza; Panama	3:46.1	Mario Pérez; Mexico	3:47.2
5000 metres	Mario Pérez; Mexico	14:24.4	Juan Martínez; Mexico	14:24.8	Pedro Miranda; Mexico	14:25.4
10,000 metres	Juan Martínez; Mexico	30:49.0 GR	Mario Pérez; Mexico	30:51.6	Andrés Romero; Mexico	30:57.6
Marathon	Alfredo Peñaloza; Mexico	2:47:23 GR	Antonio Capote; Cuba	2:48:59	Patricio Larrinaga; Cuba	2:50:38
110 metres hurdles (wind: +1.2 m/s)	Juan Morales; Cuba	14.0 GR	Arnaldo Bristol; Puerto Rico	14.2	Guillermo Núñez; Cuba	14.5
400 metres hurdles	Juan García; Cuba	50.6 GR	Alejandro Sánchez; Mexico	50.6	Miguel Olivera; Cuba	51.3
3000 metre steeplechase	Héctor Villanueva; Mexico	8:53.2 GR	Antonio Villanueva; Mexico	8:53.4	Rigoberto Mendoza; Cuba	8:55.2
4 × 100 metres relay	Cuba; Hermes Ramírez; Pablo Montes; Juan Morales; José Triana	39.4 GR	Colombia; Arquímides Mina; Jimmy Sierra; Wenceslao Ferrín Sr. Pedro Grajales	40.8	Puerto Rico; Enrique Montalvo; Víctor López; Jorge Vizcarrondo; Arnaldo Bristol	40.8
4 × 400 metres relay	Cuba; Miguel Olivera; Rodobaldo Díaz; Juan García; Antonio Álvarez	3:06.4 GR	Mexico; Melesio Piña; Carmelo Reyes; Francisco Sardo; Alejandro Sánchez	3:07.8	Puerto Rico; Tomás Fernández; Raymond Garay; Orominio Santaella; Carlos Morell	3:09.0
20 kilometre road walk	Eladio Campos; Mexico	1:41:14 GR	Francisco Chávez; Mexico	1:43:19	Lucas Lara; Cuba	1:44:38
High jump	Miguel Durañona; Cuba	2.06 GR	Teodoro Palacios; Guatemala	1.98	Lloyd Turnquist; Bahamas	1.95
Pole vault	Juan Laza; Cuba	4.65	Arturo Esquerra; Mexico	4.40	Jorge Miranda; Puerto Rico	4.30
Long jump	Abelardo Pacheco; Cuba	7.69 GR	Jorge Stevens; Cuba	7.49	Galdino Flores; Mexico	7.43
Triple jump	Pedro Pérez; Cuba	16.33 GR	José Hernández; Cuba	15.79	Juan Velázquez; Cuba	15.61
Shot put	Benigno Hodelín; Cuba	16.46 GR	Silván Hemming; Cuba	16.29	Modesto Mederos; Cuba	15.28
Discus throw	Bárbaro Cañizares; Cuba	56.04 GR	Dagoberto González; Colombia	54.48	Javier Moreno; Cuba	53.64
Hammer throw	Víctor Suárez; Cuba	57.06	Pedro Granell; Puerto Rico	53.74	Jesús Ulloa; Cuba	52.26
Javelin throw	Amado Morales; Puerto Rico	76.40 GR	Donald Vélez; Nicaragua	72.12	Justo Perelló; Cuba	70.52
Decathlon	Jesús Mirabal; Cuba	6997 GR	José Díaz; Cuba	6934	Héctor Thomas; Venezuela	6918

=== Women's events ===
Event	Gold		Silver		Bronze	
100 metres (wind: +2.1 m/s)	Miguelina Cobián; Cuba	11.4w	Fulgencia Romay; Cuba	11.6w	Cristina Hechevarría; Cuba	11.6w
200 metres (wind: 0.0 m/s)	Miguelina Cobián; Cuba	23.5 GR	Violeta Quesada; Cuba	23.9	Fulgencia Romay; Cuba	24.3
400 metres	Carmen Trustée; Cuba	52.5 GR	Aurelia Pentón; Cuba	54.3	Marcela Chivás; Cuba	55.1
800 metres	Carmen Trustée; Cuba	2:14.8 GR	Lucía Quiroz; Mexico	2:15.8	Rosalía Abadía; Panama	2:16.4
100 metres hurdles (wind: +2.5 m/s)	Marlene Elejalde; Cuba	13.9w	Lourdes Jones; Cuba	14.2w	Raquel Martínez; Cuba	14.5w
4 × 100 metres relay	Cuba; Marlene Elejalde; Cristina Hechevarría; Fulgencia Romay; Miguelina Cobián	44.7 GR	Panama; Margarita Martínez; Patricia Morgan; Dolores Cox; Nivia Trejos	47.3	Mexico; Mercedes Román; Enriqueta Basilio; Lucía Quiroz; Silvia Tapia	48.1
High jump	Hilda Fabré; Cuba	1.73 GR	Lucía Duquet; Cuba	1.68	Marima Rodríguez; Cuba	1.64
Long jump	Marcia Garbey; Cuba	6.60w	Marina Samuells; Cuba	6.31w	Miriam Pupo; Cuba	6.00w
Shot put	Grecia Hamilton; Cuba	14.56 GR	Hilda Ramírez; Cuba	13.85	Carmen Romero; Cuba	13.63
Discus throw	Carmen Romero; Cuba	53.54 GR	María Cristina Betancourt; Cuba	46.08	Hilda Ramírez; Cuba	44.10
Javelin throw	Tomasa Núñez; Cuba	45.64 GR	Hilda Ramírez; Cuba	45.46	Blanca Umaña; Colombia	43.54
Pentathlon	Marlene Elejalde; Cuba	4534 GR	Marcia Garbey; Cuba	4428	Mercedes Román; Mexico	4243

== Medal table ==
Rank	Nation	Gold	Silver	Bronze	Total
1	Cuba (CUB)	27	17	19	63
2	Mexico (MEX)	5	9	6	20
3	Puerto Rico (PUR)	2	2	3	7
4	Jamaica (JAM)	1	0	1	2
5	Panama (PAN)	0	3	2	5
6	Colombia (COL)	0	2	1	3
7	Guatemala (GUA)	0	1	0	1
7	Nicaragua (NIC)	0	1	0	1
9	Venezuela (VEN)	0	0	2	2
10	Bahamas (BAH)	0	0	1	1
Totals (10 entries)		35	35	35	105
