= 1970 Central American and Caribbean Games =

Sports events held in Panama City, Panama

Central American and Caribbean Sports Games
- Host city: Panama City
- Country: Panama
- Edition: 11th
- Nations: 21
- Athletes: 2,095
- Opening: 28 February 1970
- Closing: 13 March 1970
- Opened by: Demetrio B. Lakas
- Athlete's Oath: Ildefonso Lee
- Torch lighter: Frank Prince
- Main venue: Estadio Revolución

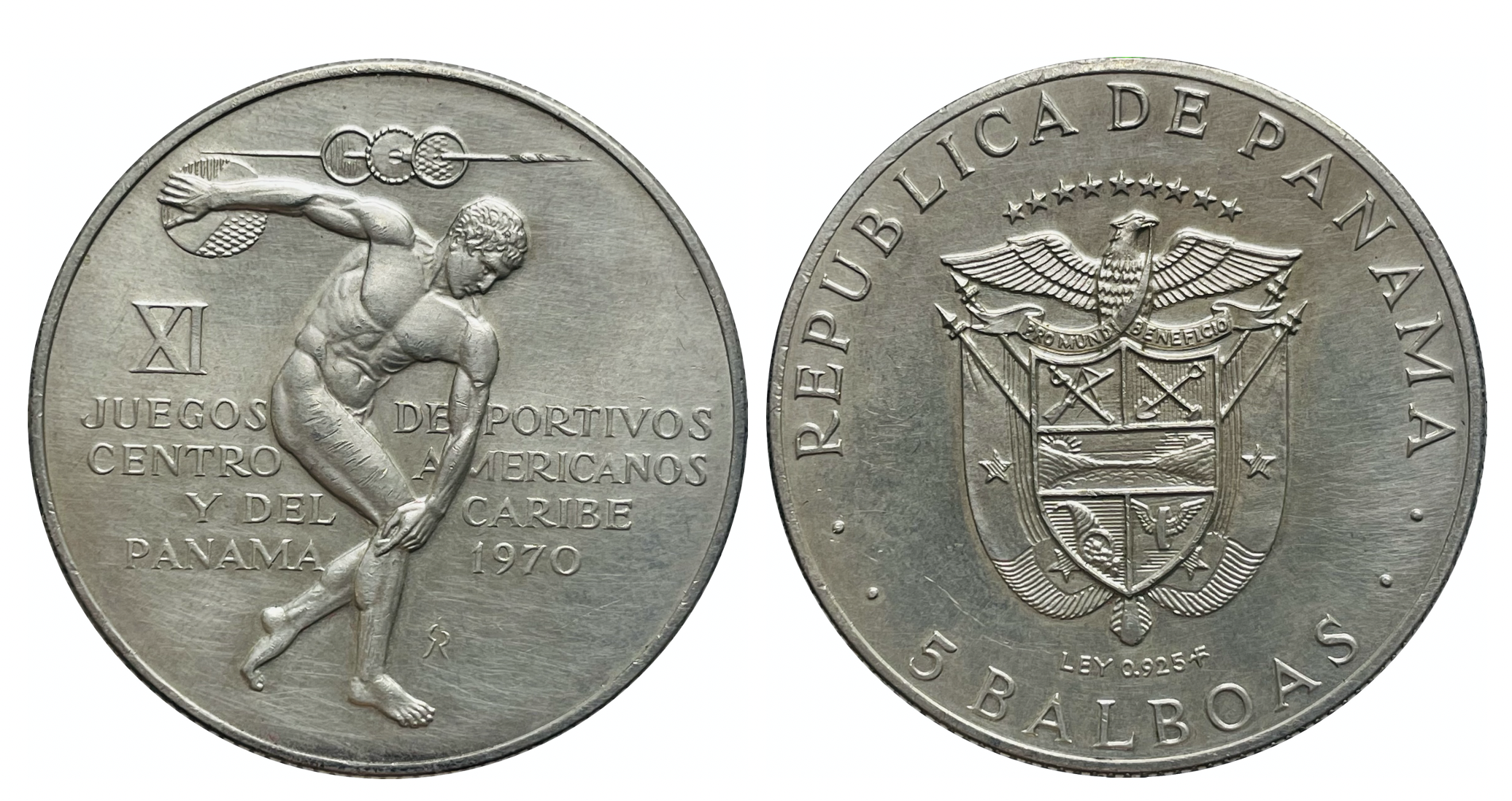
Silver coin: 5 Balboas, Panama - 11th Central American and Caribbean Games, 1970

The 11th Central American and Caribbean Games were held in Panama City, the capital of Panama from February 28 to March 13, 1970. These games featured 21 participating nations and a total number of 2,095 athletes.

== Sports ==
- Athletics ()
- Baseball ()
- Boxing ()
- Cycling ()
- Diving ()
- Fencing ()
- Football ()
- Gymnastics ()
- Judo ()
- Shooting ()
- Swimming ()
- Volleyball ()
- Water polo ()
- Weightlifting ()
- Wrestling ()

== Medal table ==
* Host nation (Panama)

1970 Central American and Caribbean Games medal table
Rank	Nation	Gold	Silver	Bronze	Total
1	Cuba	98	61	51	210
2	Mexico	38	46	46	130
3	Colombia	15	9	13	37
4	Puerto Rico	13	18	25	56
5	Venezuela	6	16	18	40
6	Panama*	5	17	19	41
7	Netherlands Antilles	5	6	10	21
8	Trinidad and Tobago	1	2	3	6
9	Jamaica	1	0	3	4
10	Guatemala	0	2	4	6
10	Guyana	0	2	4	6
12	Dominican Republic	0	2	1	3
13	Nicaragua	0	1	4	5
14	Bahamas	0	0	1	1
14	Virgin Islands	0	0	1	1
Totals (15 entries)		182	182	203	567
