= Athletics at the 1970 British Commonwealth Games – Men's 400 metres =

Men's 400 metres at the 1970 British Commonwealth Games
- Venue: Meadowbank Stadium, Edinburgh
- Dates: 22 and 23 July 1970

Medalists
gold medal	Charles Asati	Kenya
silver medal	Ross Wilson	Australia
bronze medal	Saimoni Tamani	Fiji

The men's 400 metres event at the 1970 British Commonwealth Games was held on 22–23 July 1970 at the Meadowbank Stadium in Edinburgh, Scotland. It was the first time that the metric distance was contested at the Games, replacing the 440 yards event.

== Medalists ==
Medallists
Gold	Silver	Bronze
Charles Asati; Kenya	Ross Wilson; Australia	Saimoni Tamani; Fiji

== Results ==
=== Heats ===
Held on 22 July 1970

==== Qualification for quarterfinals ====
The first 4 in each heat (Q) and the next 4 fastest (q) qualified for the quarterfinals.

Heats results
Rank	Heat	Name	Nationality	Time	Notes
1	1	Hezekiah Nyamau	Kenya	47.3	Q
2	1	Edwin Roberts	Trinidad and Tobago	47.3	Q
3	1	Martin Bilham	England	48.5	Q
4	1	Larry Barton	Canada	49.4	Q
5	1	Brian Cowley	Isle of Man	51.3	
6	1	Gerard Gangaram	Mauritius	52.1	
	1	William Koskei	Uganda	DNS	
1	2	Kent Bernard	Trinidad and Tobago	48.5	Q
2	2	Julius Sang	Kenya	49.1	Q
3	2	Leslie Miller	Bahamas	49.3	Q
4	2	Ghulam Qadir	Pakistan	50.9	Q
	2	Tony Powell	Canada	DNS	
	2	Joe Chivers	Northern Ireland	DNS	
	2	David Jenkins	Scotland	DNS	
1	3	Charles Asati	Kenya	46.7	Q
2	3	Mamman Makama	Nigeria	47.8	Q
3	3	Leighton Priestley	Jamaica	48.9	Q
4	3	Tony Harper	Bermuda	50.0	Q
5	3	John Mottley	Trinidad and Tobago	50.1	q
6	3	Peter Ndovi	Malawi	50.1	
7	3	Percy Coker	Gambia	52.7	
1	4	Garth Case	Jamaica	48.7	Q
2	4	Ian Gordon	Canada	49.7	Q
3	4	Ray Gordon	Scotland	50.1	Q
4	4	Charles Obilu	Uganda	50.6	Q
5	4	Dave Griffiths	Wales	50.6	
6	4	Wilbert Moss	Bahamas	50.7	
7	4	Nicodemus Maipambe	Zambia	50.8	
1	5	Saimoni Tamani	Fiji	47.3	Q
2	5	Musa Dogon Yaro	Nigeria	47.6	Q
3	5	Sam Bugri	Ghana	47.8	Q
4	5	Andrew Wood	Scotland	48.0	Q
7	5	Malcolm Yardley	England	50.7	
8	5	Anthony Perera	Gibraltar	53.2	
1	6	Claver Kamanya	Tanzania	47.2	Q
2	6	Ross Wilson	Australia	47.76	Q
3	6	Anthony Egwunyenga	Nigeria	48.6	Q
4	6	Fred Sowerby	Antigua and Barbuda	50.0	Q
5	6	Vikimbi Radebe	Swaziland	50.9	
6	6	Francisco Mvula	Malawi	51.2	
	6	George Daniels	Ghana	DNS	
1	7	Clifton Forbes	Jamaica	48.1	Q
2	7	Mike Hauck	England	48.7	Q
3	7	Daniel Oboth	Uganda	48.7	Q
4	7	Gary Knoke	Australia	48.91	Q
6	7	Zuku Tofile	Swaziland	50.3	
7	7	Patrick Francis	Antigua and Barbuda	52.1	
6	5	Gerard Carson	Northern Ireland	50.0	q
5	5	Norman Brinkworth	Pakistan	49.6	q
5	7	Andrew McKinney	Bahamas	49.7	q

=== Quarterfinals ===
Held on 22 July 1970

==== Qualification for semifinals ====
The first 4 in each heat (Q) qualified directly for the semifinals.

Quarterfinals results
Rank	Heat	Name	Nationality	Time	Notes
1	1	Edwin Roberts	Trinidad and Tobago	46.2	Q
2	1	Clifton Forbes	Jamaica	46.6	Q
3	1	Mike Hauck	England	46.75	Q
4	1	Mamman Makama	Nigeria	47.0	Q
5	1	Andrew Wood	Scotland	47.7	
6	1	Ian Gordon	Canada	48.4	
7	1	Charles Obilu	Uganda	48.5	
8	1	Norman Brinkworth	Pakistan	49.0	
1	2	Claver Kamanya	Tanzania	46.5	Q
2	2	Julius Sang	Kenya	46.8	Q
3	2	Kent Bernard	Trinidad and Tobago	46.8	Q
4	2	Sam Bugri	Ghana	47.5	Q
5	2	Martin Bilham	England	48.0	
6	2	Larry Barton	Canada	48.7	
7	2	Fred Sowerby	Antigua and Barbuda	48.8	
8	2	Andrew McKinney	Bahamas	49.9	
1	3	Charles Asati	Kenya	45.8	Q
2	3	Ross Wilson	Australia	46.35	Q
3	3	Anthony Egwunyenga	Nigeria	47.4	Q
4	3	Leighton Priestley	Jamaica	47.9	Q
5	3	Daniel Oboth	Uganda	48.7	
6	3	Leslie Miller	Bahamas	49.5	
7	3	Ghulam Qadir	Pakistan	50.3	
8	3	Gerard Carson	Northern Ireland	52.3	
1	4	Garth Case	Jamaica	46.6	Q
2	4	Hezekiah Nyamau	Kenya	46.9	Q
3	4	Saimoni Tamani	Fiji	46.9	Q
4	4	Gary Knoke	Australia	47.3	Q
5	4	Musa Dogon Yaro	Nigeria	47.8	
6	4	Tony Harper	Bermuda	48.9	
7	4	Ray Gordon	Scotland	49.1	
	4	John Mottley	Trinidad and Tobago	DNS	

=== Semifinals ===
Held on 23 July 1970

==== Qualification for final ====
The first 4 in each semifinal (Q) qualified directly for the final.

Semifinals results
Rank	Heat	Name	Nationality	Time	Notes
1	1	Julius Sang	Kenya	45.9	Q
2	1	Ross Wilson	Australia	45.94	Q
3	1	Edwin Roberts	Trinidad and Tobago	??.?	Q
4	1	Claver Kamanya	Tanzania	46.0	Q
5	1	Sam Bugri	Ghana	46.5	
6	1	Leighton Priestley	Jamaica	47.4	
7	1	Anthony Egwunyenga	Nigeria	47.5	
	1	Garth Case	Jamaica	DNS	
1	2	Charles Asati	Kenya	45.5	Q
2	2	Saimoni Tamani	Fiji	46.0	Q
3	2	Kent Bernard	Trinidad and Tobago	??.?	Q
4	2	Clifton Forbes	Jamaica	46.8	Q
5	2	Mike Hauck	England	46.9	
6	2	Hezekiah Nyamau	Kenya	47.3	
7	2	Gary Knoke	Australia	47.38	
8	2	Mamman Makama	Nigeria	47.6	

=== Final ===
Held on 23 July 1970

Final results
Rank	Name	Nationality	Time	Notes
1st place, gold medalist(s)	Charles Asati	Kenya	45.01	
2nd place, silver medalist(s)	Ross Wilson	Australia	45.61	
3rd place, bronze medalist(s)	Saimoni Tamani	Fiji	45.82	
4	Claver Kamanya	Tanzania	45.8	
5	Kent Bernard	Trinidad and Tobago	46.0	
6	Edwin Roberts	Trinidad and Tobago	46.1	
7	Clifton Forbes	Jamaica	46.1	
8	Julius Sang	Kenya	46.4	
