= Athletics at the 1968 Summer Olympics – Men's 4 × 400 metres relay =

These are the official results of the men's 4 × 400 metres relay event at the 1968 Summer Olympics in Mexico City, Mexico.

== Medalists ==
Gold	Silver	Bronze
United States; Vince Matthews; Ron Freeman; Larry James; Lee Evans	Kenya; Charles Asati; Munyoro Nyamau; Naftali Bon; Daniel Rudisha	West Germany; Helmar Müller; Manfred Kinder; Gerhard Hennige; Martin Jellinghaus

== Results ==
=== Heats ===
==== Heat 1 ====
Place	Nation	Athletes	Time
1	United States	Vince Matthews; Ron Freeman; Larry James; Lee Evans	3:00.71
2	Kenya	Charles Asati; Munyoro Nyamau; Naftali Bon; Daniel Rudisha	3:00.84
3	Italy	Sergio Ottolina; Giacomo Puosi; Furio Fusi; Sergio Bello	3:04.93
4	East Germany	Hartmut Schwabe; Dieter Fromm; Wolfgang Müller; Michael Zerbes	3:07.00
5	Dominican Republic	Rolando Gómez; José L'Oficial; Radhamés Mora; David Soriano	3:19.42
–	Malaysia		DNS

==== Heat 2 ====
Place	Nation	Athletes	Time
1	Poland	Stanisław Grędziński; Jan Balachowski; Jan Werner; Andrzej Badeński	3:03.02
2	Great Britain	Martin Winbolt-Lewis; Colin Campbell; Dave Hemery; John Sherwood	3:03.67
3	Nigeria	Mamman Makama; David Ejoke; Musa Dogon Yaro; Anthony Egwunyenga	3:05.78
4	Senegal	Amadou Gakou; Daour M'baye Guèye; Papa M'Baye N'Diaye; Mamadou Sarr	3:06.94
–	Belgium		DNS
–	Jamaica		DNS

==== Heat 3 ====
Place	Nation	Athletes	Time
1	West Germany	Helmar Müller; Gerhard Hennige; Manfred Kinder; Martin Jellinghaus	3:03.90
2	Trinidad and Tobago	George Simon; Euric Bobb; Ben Cayenne; Edwin Roberts	3:04.55
3	France	Jacques Carette; Gilles Bertould; Jean-Pierre Boccardo; Christian Nicolau	3:04.69
4	Cuba	Carlos Martínez; Eddy Téllez; Miguel Olivera; Rodobaldo Díaz	3:05.28
5	Venezuela	Víctor Patíñez; Raúl Dome; Víctor Maldonado; José Jacinto Hidalgo	3:07.65
6	Mexico	Melesio Piña; Salvador Medina; Carlos Castro; Francisco Sardo	3:08.19
7	Canada	Ross MacKenzie; Brian MacLaren; Bill Crothers; Wes Brooker	3:09,70

=== Final ===
Place	Nation	Athletes	Time (hand)	Time (automatic)
1	United States	Vince Matthews; Ron Freeman; Larry James; Lee Evans	2:56.1 (WR)	2:56.16
2	Kenya	Charles Asati; Munyoro Nyamau; Naftali Bon; Daniel Rudisha	2:59.6	2:59.64
3	West Germany	Helmar Müller; Manfred Kinder; Gerhard Hennige; Martin Jellinghaus	3:00.5	3:00.57
4	Poland	Stanisław Grędziński; Jan Balachowski; Jan Werner; Andrzej Badeński	3:00.5	3:00.58
5	Great Britain	Martin Winbolt-Lewis; Colin Campbell; David Hemery; John Sherwood	3:01.2	3:01.21
6	Trinidad and Tobago	George Simon; Euric Bobb; Benedict Cayenne; Edwin Roberts	3:04.5	3:04.54
7	Italy	Sergio Ottolina; Giacomo Puosi; Furio Fusi; Sergio Bello	3:04.6	3:04.64
8	France	Jean-Claude Nallet; Jacques Carette; Gilles Bertould; Jean-Pierre Boccardo	3:07.5	3:07.51
