= Athletics at the 1970 British Commonwealth Games – Men's 4 × 400 metres relay =

Men's 4 × 400 metres relay at the 1970 British Commonwealth Games
- Venue: Meadowbank Stadium, Edinburgh
- Dates: 24 and 25 July 1970

Medalists
gold medal	Munyoro Nyamau, Julius Sang, Robert Ouko, Charles Asati	Kenya
silver medal	Mel Wong Shing, Ben Cayenne, Kent Bernard, Edwin Roberts	Trinidad and Tobago
bronze medal	Martin Bilham, Len Walters, Mike Hauck, John Sherwood	England

The men's 4 × 400 metres relay event at the 1970 British Commonwealth Games was held on 24 and 25 July at the Meadowbank Stadium in Edinburgh, Scotland. It was the first time that the metric distance was contested at the Games, replacing the 4 × 440 yards relay.

== Medallists ==
Medallists
Gold	Silver	Bronze
Kenya; Munyoro Nyamau, Julius Sang, Robert Ouko, Charles Asati	Trinidad and Tobago; Mel Wong Shing, Ben Cayenne, Kent Bernard, Edwin Roberts	England; Martin Bilham, Len Walters, Mike Hauck, John Sherwood

== Results ==
=== Heats ===
==== Qualification for final ====
The first 4 teams of each heat (Q) qualified directly for the final. (The disqualification of Uganda from Heat 2 effectively promoted Malawi from Heat 1.)

Heats results
Rank	Heat	Nation	Athletes	Time	Notes
1	1	Kenya	Munyoro Nyamau, Julius Sang, Robert Ouko, Charles Asati	3:05.1	Q
2	1	Jamaica	Leighton Priestly, Mahoney Samuels, Byron Dyce, Clifton Forbes	3:06.1	Q
3	1	Canada	Ian Gordon, Larry Barton, Doug Chapman, Tony Powell	3:07.9	Q
4	1	Nigeria	Mamman Makama, Gladstone Agbamu, Anthony Egwunyenga, Musa Dogon Yaro	3:07.9	Q
5	1	Malawi	Peter Ndovi, Peter Njera, Francisco Mvula, Richard Nandolo	3:19.7	q
1	2	Trinidad and Tobago	Mel Wong Shing, Ben Cayenne, Kent Bernard, Edwin Roberts	3:09.4	Q
2	2	England	Martin Bilham, Len Walters, Mike Hauck, John Sherwood	3:11.2	Q
3	2	Scotland	Andrew Wood, David Walker, Michael MacLean, William Taylor	3:12.5	Q
	2	Uganda	Charles Obilu, Daniel Oboth, William Dralu, William Koskei	DQ	

=== Final ===
Final results
Rank	Nation	Athletes	Time	Notes
1st place, gold medalist(s)	Kenya	Munyoro Nyamau, Julius Sang, Robert Ouko, Charles Asati	3:03.63	
2nd place, silver medalist(s)	Trinidad and Tobago	Mel Wong Shing, Ben Cayenne, Kent Bernard, Edwin Roberts	3:05.49	
3rd place, bronze medalist(s)	England	Martin Bilham, Len Walters, Mike Hauck, John Sherwood	3:05.53	
4	Canada	Ian Gordon, Larry Barton, Doug Chapman, Tony Powell	3:06.4	
5	Jamaica	Leighton Priestly, Mahoney Samuels, Byron Dyce, Clifton Forbes	3:06.4	
6	Scotland	Andrew Wood, David Walker, Michael MacLean, William Taylor	3:09.0	
7	Nigeria	Mamman Makama, Gladstone Agbamu, Anthony Egwunyenga, Musa Dogon Yaro	3:09.7	
8	Malawi	Francisco Mvula, Peter Ndovi, Peter Njera, Richard Nandolo	3:20.6	
