= Athletics at the 1971 Pan American Games – Men's 4 × 400 metres relay =

Men's 4 × 400 metres relay at the Pan American Games

The men's 4 × 400 metres relay event at the 1971 Pan American Games was held in Cali on 4 and 5 August.

== Medallists ==
Gold	Silver	Bronze
United States; Dale Alexander; Fred Newhouse; Tommy Turner; John Smith	Jamaica; Leighton Priestley; Trevor Campbell; Alfred Daley; Garth Case	Trinidad and Tobago; Edwin Roberts; Ben Cayenne; Kent Bernard; Trevor James

== Results ==
=== Heats ===
Rank	Heat	Nation	Athletes	Time	Notes
1	2	Jamaica	Leighton Priestley, Trevor Campbell, Alfred Daley, Garth Case	3:07.7	Q
2	2	Trinidad and Tobago	Edwin Roberts, Ben Cayenne, Kent Bernard, Trevor James	3:09.7	Q
3	2	Cuba	Antonio Álvarez, Rodovaldo Díaz, José Triana Pérez, Leandro Civil	3:09.8	Q
4	2	Colombia	Migdonio Palacios, Fabio Zúñiga, Julio Escobar, Pedro Grajales	3:10.7	Q
5	2	Argentina	Carlos Heuchert, Alberto Gajate, Juan Carlos Dyrzka, Andrés Calonge	3:11.1	
6	1	Canada	Ian Gordon, Brock Aynsley, Craig Blackman, Doug Chapman	3:14.8	Q
7	1	United States	Dale Alexander, Fred Newhouse, Tommy Turner, John Smith	3:14.8	Q
8	2	Mexico	Felipe Cigala, Carmelo Reyes, Manuel Ruiz, Melesio Piña	3:17.8	
9	1	Peru	Jorge Alemán, José Siguas, Augusto Machinares, Fernando Acevedo	3:24.3	Q
10	1	Venezuela	Raúl Dome, Víctor Patinez, José Jacinto Hidalgo, Alberto Marchán	3:36.7	Q
	1	Dominican Republic		DNS	

=== Final ===
Rank	Nation	Athletes	Time	Notes
1st place, gold medalist(s)	United States	Dale Alexander, Fred Newhouse, Tommy Turner, John Smith	3:00.63	GR
2nd place, silver medalist(s)	Jamaica	Leighton Priestley, Trevor Campbell, Alfred Daley, Garth Case	3:03.98	
3rd place, bronze medalist(s)	Trinidad and Tobago	Edwin Roberts, Ben Cayenne, Kent Bernard, Trevor James	3:04.58	
4	Canada	Brock Aynsley, Ian Gordon, Craig Blackman, Doug Chapman	3:04.9	
5	Peru	Jorge Alemán, José Siguas, Augusto Machinares, Fernando Acevedo	3:08.5	
6	Cuba	Antonio Álvarez, Rodovaldo Díaz, José Triana Pérez, Leandro Civil	3:08.9	
7	Venezuela	Raúl Dome, Rómulo Carreño, José Jacinto Hidalgo, Alberto Marchán	3:08.9	
8	Colombia	Migdonio Palacios, Fabio Zúñiga, Julio Escobar, Pedro Grajales	3:09.5	
