= Athletics at the 1968 Summer Olympics – Men's 400 metres =

Men's 400 metres at the Games of the XIX Olympiad
- Venue: University Olympic Stadium, Mexico City
- Dates: 16–18 October 1968
- Competitors: 55 from 36 nations
- Winning time: 43.86 WR

Medalists
1st place, gold medalist(s)		Lee Evans; United States
2nd place, silver medalist(s)		Larry James; United States
3rd place, bronze medalist(s)		Ron Freeman; United States

Official Video Highlights @1:04:38 Video on YouTube

The men's 400 metres was an event at the 1968 Summer Olympics in Mexico City. The competition was held between 16–18 of October. Times are listed as both hand timing and automatic timing. Hand timing was the official time used in the 1968 Olympics. Fifty-five athletes from 36 nations competed. The maximum number of athletes per nation had been set at 3 since the 1930 Olympic Congress. The event was won by Lee Evans of the United States, the fourth consecutive and 11th overall title in the event by an American. The Americans swept the podium, the second time a podium sweep occurred in the men's 400 metres (the United States had previously done it in 1904, when the nation had 10 of the 12 competitors).

== Background ==
This was the sixteenth appearance of the event, which is one of 12 athletics events to have been held at every Summer Olympics. Andrzej Badeński of Poland, who had won bronze in 1964, was the only finalist from the Tokyo Games to compete again in 1968. The United States team was "dominant in this event in 1968"; Larry James held the world record at 44.1 seconds, Lee Evans was the AAU and NCAA champion, and even the third member of the team, Ron Freeman, ran well below Olympic record time at the U.S. trials.

Barbados, the Dominican Republic, El Salvador, Morocco, Nicaragua, and Sudan appeared in this event for the first time. The federation of Malaysia also competed for the first time, though Malaya had previously appeared. East and West Germany competed separately for the first time. The United States made its sixteenth appearance in the event, the only nation to compete in it at every Olympic Games to that point.

== Competition format ==
The competition retained the basic four-round format from 1920. The "fastest loser" system, introduced in 1964, was available but not used in 1968 because there was no need to balance quarterfinals as there were 8 heats in the first round. Those heats each had between 6 and 8 athletes, with the top four advancing. The 4 quarterfinals each had 8 runners; the top four athletes in each quarterfinal heat advanced to the semifinals. The semifinals featured 2 heats of 8 runners each. The top four runners in each semifinal heat advanced, making an eight-man final.

== Records ==
Prior to the competition, the existing World and Olympic records were as follows.

World record	Larry James (USA)	44.1	Echo Summit, United States	14 September 1968
Olympic record	Otis Davis (USA)	44.9	Rome, Italy	6 September 1960

Lee Evans broke the Olympic record with a 44.8 second run in the second semifinal; both Larry James and Martin Jellinghaus matched the old record in that same semifinal. All three Americans broke the new record in the final, with Evans (43.8 seconds) and James (43.9 seconds) also coming in under the world record time. Evans' auto-timed result of 43.86 seconds was not official under the rules at that point (which used hand-timed results) but was later recognized as the initial world record upon the switch to automatic timing as official in 1977.

== Schedule ==
The quarterfinals were held on the second day (with the semifinals) rather than the first day (with the first round heats), a change from previous years.

All times are Central Standard Time (UTC-6)

Date	Time	Round
Wednesday, 16 October 1968	15:40	Round 1
Thursday, 17 October 1968	15:20; 18:00	Quarterfinals; Semifinals
Friday, 18 October 1968	15:50	Final

== Results ==
=== Round 1 ===
The top four runners in each of the eight heats advanced to the quarterfinal round.

==== Heat 1 ====
Rank	Athlete	Nation	Time (hand)	Time (auto)	Notes
1	Lee Evans	United States	45.3	45.40	Q
2	Claver Kamanya	Tanzania	45.7	45.74	Q
3	Christian Nicolau	France	45.7	45.77	Q
4	Sam Bugri	Ghana	45.8	45.88	Q
5	Manfred Kinder	West Germany	46.9	46.95	
6	Ezra Burnham	Barbados	47.9	47.94	

==== Heat 2 ====
Rank	Athlete	Nation	Time (hand)	Time (auto)	Notes
1	Andrzej Badeński	Poland	45.5	45.52	Q
2	Clifton Forbes	Jamaica	45.7	45.75	Q
3	Larry James	United States	45.8	45.83	Q
4	Daniel Rudisha	Kenya	46.9	46.96	Q
5	Angelo Hussein	Sudan	47.7	47.80	
6	Victor Asirvatham	Malaysia	48.0	48.02	

==== Heat 3 ====
Rank	Athlete	Nation	Time (hand)	Time (auto)	Notes
1	Amadou Gakou	Senegal	45.3	45.39	Q
2	Tegegne Bezabeh	Ethiopia	45.5	45.60	Q
3	Ron Freeman	United States	45.6	45.67	Q
4	Rodobaldo Díaz	Cuba	46.4	46.48	Q
5	Ramon Magariños	Spain	46.9	46.92	
6	Anthony Egwunyenga	Nigeria	47.3	47.37	
7	Francisco Menocal	Nicaragua	49.1	49.14	

==== Heat 4 ====
Rank	Athlete	Nation	Time (hand)	Time (auto)	Notes
1	Martin Jellinghaus	West Germany	46.4	46.50	Q
2	Pedro Grajales	Colombia	46.7	46.73	Q
3	Michael Zerbes	East Germany	46.8	46.84	Q
4	Ross MacKenzie	Canada	47.0	47.05	Q
5	Howard Davies	Great Britain	47.2	47.30	
6	Jacques Pennewaert	Belgium	48.5	48.55	
7	José Astacio	El Salvador	52.9	52.92	

==== Heat 5 ====
Rank	Athlete	Nation	Time (hand)	Time (auto)	Notes
1	Amos Omolo	Uganda	45.8	45.85	Q
2	Munyoro Nyamau	Kenya	45.9	45.91	Q
3	Jean-Claude Nallet	France	45.9	45.93	Q
4	Helmar Müller	West Germany	45.9	45.98	Q
5	José Jacinto Hidalgo	Venezuela	46.3	46.32	
6	Carlos Martínez	Cuba	47.2	47.28	
7	Tony Harper	Bermuda	49.1	49.18	

==== Heat 6 ====
Rank	Athlete	Nation	Time (hand)	Time (auto)	Notes
1	Jan Werner	Poland	45.9	45.97	Q
2	Martin Winbolt-Lewis	Great Britain	46.2	46.27	Q
3	Mamman Makama	Nigeria	46.4	46.49	Q
4	Sergio Bello	Italy	46.5	46.54	Q
5	Eddy Téllez	Cuba	46.7	46.80	
6	Noel Carroll	Ireland	46.8	46.83	
7	José L'Oficial	Dominican Republic	47.9	47.93	

==== Heat 7 ====
Rank	Athlete	Nation	Time (hand)	Time (auto)	Notes
1	Naftali Bon	Kenya	46.2	46.21	Q
2	Jan Balachowski	Poland	46.2	46.23	Q
3	Musa Dogon Yaro	Nigeria	46.2	46.24	Q
4	Gilles Bertould	France	46.3	46.31	Q
5	Don Domansky	Canada	46.4	46.46	
6	Melesio Piña	Mexico	46.8	46.81	
7	Leslie Miller	Bahamas	46.9	46.99	
8	Yoyaga Dit Coulibaly	Ivory Coast	50.0	50.11	

==== Heat 8 ====
Rank	Athlete	Nation	Time (hand)	Time (auto)	Notes
1	Wolfgang Müller	East Germany	46.6	46.66	Q
2	Colin Campbell	Great Britain	46.6	46.66	Q
3	Sergio Ottolina	Italy	46.7	46.78	Q
4	Juan Carlos Dyrzka	Argentina	47.0	47.02	Q
5	George Simon	Trinidad and Tobago	47.9	47.95	
6	Omar Ghizlat	Morocco	48.2	48.23	
7	Kun Min-Mu	Taiwan	49.0	49.07	

=== Quarterfinals ===
The top four runners in each of the four heats advanced to the semifinal round.

==== Quarterfinal 1 ====
Rank	Athlete	Nation	Time (hand)	Time (auto)	Notes
1	Amadou Gakou	Senegal	45.5	45.56	Q
2	Larry James	United States	45.7	45.77	Q
3	Claver Kamanya	Tanzania	46.0	46.03	Q
4	Ross MacKenzie	Canada	46.1	46.15	Q
5	Musa Dogon Yaro	Nigeria	46.1	46.19	
6	Colin Campbell	Great Britain	46.3	46.35	
7	Naftali Bon	Kenya	46.3	46.39	
8	Sergio Bello	Italy	46.8	46.84	

==== Quarterfinal 2 ====
Rank	Athlete	Nation	Time (hand)	Time (auto)	Notes
1	Amos Omolo	Uganda	45.3	45.33	Q
2	Lee Evans	United States	45.5	45.54	Q
3	Munyoro Nyamau	Kenya	46.1	46.12	Q
4	Wolfgang Müller	East Germany	46.2	46.32	Q
5	Jan Balachowski	Poland	46.3	46.33	
6	Rodobaldo Díaz	Cuba	46.3	46.38	
7	Juan Carlos Dyrzka	Argentina	46.8	46.85	
—	Christian Nicolau	France	DNS	—	

==== Quarterfinal 3 ====
Rank	Athlete	Nation	Time (hand)	Time (auto)	Notes
1	Jan Werner	Poland	45.6	45.63	Q
2	Martin Jellinghaus	West Germany	45.9	46.00	Q
3	Tegegne Bezabeh	Ethiopia	46.0	46.02	Q
4	Sam Bugri	Ghana	46.0	46.08	Q
5	Clifton Forbes	Jamaica	46.2	46.29	
6	Daniel Rudisha	Kenya	47.6	47.68	
7	Gilles Bertould	France	48.9	48.91	
—	Sergio Ottolina	Italy	DNS	—	

==== Quarterfinal 4 ====
Rank	Athlete	Nation	Time (hand)	Time (auto)	Notes
1	Ron Freeman	United States	45.3	45.31	Q
2	Andrzej Badeński	Poland	45.6	45.60	Q
3	Helmar Müller	West Germany	45.7	45.78	Q
4	Jean-Claude Nallet	France	45.7	45.80	Q
5	Martin Winbolt-Lewis	Great Britain	45.9	45.91	
6	Michael Zerbes	East Germany	46.1	46.19	
7	Mamman Makama	Nigeria	46.4	46.41	
8	Pedro Grajales	Colombia	46.5	46.53	

=== Semifinals ===
Top four in each of the two heats advanced to the final round.

==== Semifinal 1 ====
Rank	Athlete	Nation	Time (hand)	Time (auto)	Notes
1	Amadou Gakou	Senegal	45.1	45.17	Q
2	Ron Freeman	United States	45.4	45.47	Q
3	Andrzej Badeński	Poland	45.4	45.50	Q
4	Tegegne Bezabeh	Ethiopia	45.5	45.60	Q
5	Sam Burgi	Ghana	45.9	45.92	
6	Helmar Müller	West Germany	46.2	46.22	
7	Claver Kamanya	Tanzania	46.2	46.22	
8	Wolfgang Müller	East Germany	48.3	48.37	

==== Semifinal 2 ====
Rank	Athlete	Nation	Time (hand)	Time (auto)	Notes
1	Lee Evans	United States	44.8	44.83	Q, OR
2	Larry James	United States	44.9	44.88	Q
3	Martin Jellinghaus	West Germany	44.9	45.06	Q
4	Amos Omolo	Uganda	45.4	45.52	Q
5	Jan Werner	Poland	45.7	45.75	
6	Munyoro Nyamau	Kenya	46.3	46.37	
7	Jean-Claude Nallet	France	49.0	49.01	
8	Ross MacKenzie	Canada	49.2	49.28	

=== Final ===
Evans nearly withdrew from the final in protest of the expulsion of his college teammates Tommie Smith and John Carlos from the Games after their Black Power salute. Smith and Carlos, however, convinced him to compete. Evans and James were the first runners to achieve times below 44 seconds in the 400 metres.

Rank	Lane	Athlete	Nation	Time (hand)	Time (auto)	Notes
1st place, gold medalist(s)	6	Lee Evans	United States	43.8	43.86	WR
2nd place, silver medalist(s)	2	Larry James	United States	43.9	43.97	
3rd place, bronze medalist(s)	1	Ron Freeman	United States	44.4	44.41	
4	5	Amadou Gakou	Senegal	45.0	45.01	
5	3	Martin Jellinghaus	West Germany	45.3	45.33	
6	4	Tegegne Bezabeh	Ethiopia	45.4	45.42	
7	7	Andrzej Badeński	Poland	45.4	45.42	
8	8	Amos Omolo	Uganda	47.6	47.61	
