= Athletics at the 1970 Summer Universiade – Men's 400 metres =

The men's 400 metres event at the 1970 Summer Universiade was held at the Stadio Comunale in Turin on 3 and 4 September 1970.

== Medalists ==
Gold	Silver	Bronze
Tom Ulan; United States	Martin Jellinghaus; West Germany	Jacques Carette; France

== Results ==
=== Heats ===
Held on 3 September

Rank	Heat	Athlete	Nationality	Time	Notes
1	1	Tommie Turner	United States	47.1	Q
2	1	Roland Rossmeissl	West Germany	47.5	Q
3	1	Claudio Trachelio	Italy	47.8	q
4	1	Ethelbert Nwagbo	Nigeria	49.3	
5	1	João Merlin Nobre	Portugal	49.3	
6	1	Alfred Wolf	Austria	49.6	
7	1	Thanyan Al-Ghanim	Kuwait	55.5	
1	2	Tom Ulan	United States	46.3	Q
2	2	Borys Savchuk	Soviet Union	46.8	Q
3	2	Antonio Álvarez	Cuba	47.1	q
4	2	József Fügedi	Hungary	47.4	q
5	2	Josef Sammt	Austria	50.9	
6	2	Abdulghalil Al-Kassim	Kuwait	55.3	
1	3	Mike Hauck	Great Britain	48.1	Q
2	3	Martin Jellinghaus	West Germany	48.2	Q
3	3	Jacques Anseeuw	Belgium	48.7	
4	3	Sid Ali Djouadi	Algeria	49.0	
5	3	Eduardo Marques	Portugal	49.4	
1	4	Jacques Carette	France	47.2	Q
2	4	Jim Aukett	Great Britain	47.2	Q
3	4	Furio Fusi	Italy	47.3	q
4	4	Aleksandr Bratchikov	Soviet Union	47.5	q
5	4	José Triana Pérez	Cuba	48.5	
6	4	Juan Argüello	Nicaragua	52.5	
1	5	Gilles Bertould	France	47.5	Q
2	5	Fanahan McSweeney	Ireland	47.5	Q
3	5	István Bátori	Hungary	47.7	q
4	5	Emile Jung	Luxembourg	48.4	
5	5	Salah Ghadri	Tunisia	48.5	
6	5	Louis Nkanza	Congo	49.1	

=== Semifinals ===
Held on 4 September

Rank	Heat	Athlete	Nationality	Time	Notes
1	1	Tom Ulan	United States	46.5	Q
2	1	Jacques Carette	France	46.7	Q
3	1	Martin Jellinghaus	West Germany	46.7	Q
4	1	Aleksandr Bratchikov	Soviet Union	46.8	Q
5	1	Antonio Álvarez	Cuba	46.9	
6	1	Mike Hauck	Great Britain	47.2	
7	1	József Fügedi	Hungary	47.2	
8	1	Claudio Trachelio	Italy	47.4	
1	2	Tommie Turner	United States	46.9	Q
2	2	Gilles Bertould	France	47.1	Q
3	2	Borys Savchuk	Soviet Union	47.1	Q
4	2	Roland Rossmeissl	West Germany	47.2	Q
5	2	Furio Fusi	Italy	47.4	
6	2	Jim Aukett	Great Britain	47.5	
7	2	Fanahan McSweeney	Ireland	47.6	
8	2	István Bátori	Hungary	47.9	

=== Final ===
Held on 4 September

Rank	Name	Nationality	Time	Notes
1st place, gold medalist(s)	Tom Ulan	United States	45.9	UR
2nd place, silver medalist(s)	Martin Jellinghaus	West Germany	46.2	
3rd place, bronze medalist(s)	Jacques Carette	France	46.3	
4	Tommie Turner	United States	46.3	
5	Borys Savchuk	Soviet Union	46.6	
6	Roland Rossmeissl	West Germany	46.7	
7	Gilles Bertould	France	46.8	
8	Aleksandr Bratchikov	Soviet Union	47.0	
