= Athletics at the 1967 Pan American Games – Men's 400 metres =

Men's 400 metres at the Pan American Games

The men's 400 metres event at the 1967 Pan American Games was held in Winnipeg on 29 and 30 July.

== Medalists ==
Gold	Silver	Bronze
Lee Evans; United States	Vince Matthews; United States	Don Domansky; Canada

== Results ==
=== Heats ===
Held on 29 July

Rank	Heat	Name	Nationality	Time	Notes
1	1	Lee Evans	United States	45.81	Q
2	3	Juan Franceschi	Puerto Rico	46.09	Q
3	3	Don Domansky	Canada	46.28	Q
4	1	Pedro Grajales	Colombia	46.47	Q
5	2	Vince Matthews	United States	46.63	Q
6	3	Pablo Montes	Cuba	47.10	Q
7	1	Ross MacKenzie	Canada	47.18	Q
8	2	Clifton Forbes	Jamaica	47.25	Q
9	2	Carlos Álvarez	Colombia	47.64	Q
10	2	Rodobaldo Díaz	Cuba	47.73	Q
11	3	Jorge Alemán	Peru	47.78	Q
12	3	Neville Myton	Jamaica	47.90	Q
13	3	Benedict Cayenne	Trinidad and Tobago	48.04	q
14	1	Leslie Miller	Bahamas	48.07	Q
15	1	Andrés Calonge	Argentina	48.12	Q
16	1	Juan Suyón	Peru	48.28	
17	2	Salvador Medina	Mexico	48.35	Q
18	1	Federico Vera	Mexico	49.03	
19	3	Miguel Villacres	Ecuador	49.47	
	2	Edwin Skinner	Trinidad and Tobago	DNS	
	2	Enrique Montalvo	Puerto Rico	DNS	

=== Semifinals ===
Held on 29 July

Rank	Heat	Name	Nationality	Time	Notes
1	2	Vince Matthews	United States	45.38	Q
2	2	Don Domansky	Canada	45.92	Q
3	1	Lee Evans	United States	45.97	Q
4	1	Juan Franceschi	Puerto Rico	46.36	Q
5	2	Pedro Grajales	Colombia	46.58	Q
6	1	Ross MacKenzie	Canada	46.62	Q
7	2	Pablo Montes	Cuba	46.72	Q
8	1	Clifton Forbes	Jamaica	46.82	Q
9	1	Rodobaldo Díaz	Cuba	47.35	
10	1	Carlos Álvarez	Colombia	47.83	
11	2	Benedict Cayenne	Trinidad and Tobago	47.92	
12	2	Neville Myton	Jamaica	48.47	
13	2	Jorge Alemán	Peru	48.57	
14	1	Leslie Miller	Bahamas	48.61	
	1	Salvador Medina	Mexico	DNS	
	2	Andrés Calonge	Argentina	DNS	

=== Final ===
Held on 30 July

Rank	Name	Nationality	Time	Notes
1st place, gold medalist(s)	Lee Evans	United States	44.95	
2nd place, silver medalist(s)	Vince Matthews	United States	45.13	
3rd place, bronze medalist(s)	Don Domansky	Canada	45.80	
4	Juan Franceschi	Puerto Rico	46.32	
5	Ross MacKenzie	Canada	46.76	
6	Pablo Montes	Cuba	46.88	
7	Pedro Grajales	Colombia	47.00	
8	Clifton Forbes	Jamaica	47.14	
