= Clifton Forbes =

Jamaican sprinter (1946–2010)

Clifton L. Forbes (18 February 1946 – 1 March 2010) was an Olympic athlete, who represented Jamaica at the 1968 Summer Olympics in Mexico City. He won a bronze medal in the 4×400 metre relay at the 1967 Pan American Games.

Later he served as a manager for teams to the Olympic, Commonwealth, Pan American, Central America and Caribbean Games, and a trainer of the national netball team.

== Death ==
On 1 March 2010, Forbes died at the age of 64 after a long illness.

== International competitions ==
Year	Competition	Venue	Position	Event	Notes
Representing Jamaica
1964	British West Indies Championships	Kingston, Jamaica	3rd	200 m	21.6
1966	Central American and Caribbean Games	San Juan, Puerto Rico	5th	200 m	21.5
1966	Central American and Caribbean Games	San Juan, Puerto Rico	1st	4 × 400 m relay	3:08.8
1966	British Empire and Commonwealth Games	Kingston, Jamaica	17th (qf)	220 y	21.8
1966	British Empire and Commonwealth Games	Kingston, Jamaica	4th	4 × 440 y relay	3:06.8
1967	Pan American Games	Winnipeg, Canada	8th	400 m	47.14
1967	Pan American Games	Winnipeg, Canada	5th	4 × 100 m relay	40.23
1967	Pan American Games	Winnipeg, Canada	3rd	4 × 400 m relay	3:05.99
1968	Olympic Games	Mexico City, Mexico	21st (qf)	400 m	46.29
1968	Olympic Games	Mexico City, Mexico	4th	4 × 100 m relay	38.4
1970	Central American and Caribbean Games	Panama City, Panama	7th	400 m	48.8
1970	British Commonwealth Games	Edinburgh, United Kingdom	7th	400 m	46.1
1970	British Commonwealth Games	Edinburgh, United Kingdom	5th	4 × 400 m relay	3:06.4
