= Athletics at the 1971 Pan American Games – Men's long jump =

Men's long jump at the Pan American Games

The men's long jump event at the 1971 Pan American Games was held in Cali on 3 August.

== Results ==
Rank	Name	Nationality	Result	Notes
1st place, gold medalist(s)	Arnie Robinson	United States	8.02	
2nd place, silver medalist(s)	Bouncy Moore	United States	7.98	
3rd place, bronze medalist(s)	Mike Mason	Canada	7.65	
4	Ramon Díaz	Cuba	7.62	
5	George Swanston	Trinidad and Tobago	7.61	
6	Luiz Carlos de Souza	Brazil	7.43	
7	Abelardo Pacheco	Cuba	7.38	
8	Jaime Pautt	Colombia	7.10	
	Salomón Rowe	Guatemala	DNS	
