= Athletics at the 1967 Pan American Games – Men's 4 × 400 metres relay =

Men's 4 × 400 metres relay at the Pan American Games

The men's 4 × 400 metres relay event at the 1967 Pan American Games was held in Winnipeg on 5 August.

== Results ==
| Rank | Nation | Athletes | Time | Notes |
|---|---|---|---|---|
| 1st place, gold medalist(s) | United States | Elbert Stinson, Emmett Taylor, Vince Matthews, Lee Evans | 3:02.03 | |
| 2nd place, silver medalist(s) | Canada | Brian MacLaren, Ross MacKenzie, Bob McLaren, Bill Crothers | 3:04.83 | |
| 3rd place, bronze medalist(s) | Jamaica | Neville Myton, Michael Fray, Alex McDonald, Clifton Forbes | 3:05.99 | |
| 4 | Peru | Fernando Acevedo, Jorge Arriaga, Juan Suyón, Jorge Alemán | 3:09.97 | |
| 5 | Colombia | Jaime Uribe, Orlando Gutiérrez, Carlos Álvarez, Pedro Grajales | 3:10.41 | |
| 6 | Trinidad and Tobago | George Simon, Lennox Yearwood, John Mottley, Benedict Cayenne | 3:10.82 | |
| 7 | Mexico | Federico Vera, Roberto Silva, César Sánchez, Salvador Medina | 3:11.51 | |
| | Cuba | | DNS | |
