= Rodobaldo Díaz =

Cuban sprinter (born 1942)

Personal information
- Full name: Rodobaldo Díaz Arambarry
- Nationality: Argentine
- Born: 16 March 1942 (age 84) Matanzas, Cuba
- Height: 1.78 m (5 ft 10 in)
- Weight: 71 kg (157 lb)

Sport
- Sport: Athletics
- Event: 400 metres
Medal record
Representing Cuba
Central American and Caribbean Games
Gold medal – first place	1970 Panama City	4x400m relay
Bronze medal – third place	1966 San Juan	400m

Rodobaldo Díaz Arambarry (born 16 March 1942) is a Cuban former sprinter who competed in the 1968 Summer Olympics.

== International competitions ==
Year	Competition	Venue	Position	Event	Notes
Representing Cuba
1962	Central American and Caribbean Games	Kingston, Jamaica	24th (h)	100 m	11.2
1962	Central American and Caribbean Games	Kingston, Jamaica	16th (h)	200 m	22.1
1962	Ibero-American Games	Madrid, Spain	9th (sf)	100 m	11.0
1962	Ibero-American Games	Madrid, Spain	6th (sf)	200 m	22.3
1966	Central American and Caribbean Games	San Juan, Puerto Rico	3rd	400 m	47.10
1966	Central American and Caribbean Games	San Juan, Puerto Rico	5th	4 × 400 m relay	3:13.5
1967	Pan American Games	Winnipeg, Canada	9th (sf)	400 m	47.35
1967	Central American and Caribbean Championships	Xalapa, Mexico	2nd	400 m	47.6
1968	Olympic Games	Mexico City, Mexico	23rd (qf)	400 m	46.38
1968	Olympic Games	Mexico City, Mexico	9th (h)	4 × 400 m relay	3:05.28
1969	Central American and Caribbean Championships	Havana, Cuba	1st	4 × 400 m relay	3:13.1
1970	Central American and Caribbean Games	Panama City, Panama	4th	400 m	47.3
1970	Central American and Caribbean Games	Panama City, Panama	1st	4 × 400 m relay	3:06.4
1970	Universiade	Turin, Italy	7th	4 × 400 m relay	3:09.5
1971	Central American and Caribbean Championships	Kingston, Jamaica	11th (sf)	400 m	48.10
1971	Central American and Caribbean Championships	Kingston, Jamaica	6th	4 × 400 m relay	3:08.9
1971	Pan American Games	Cali, Colombia	8th	400 m	47.46
1971	Pan American Games	Cali, Colombia	6th	4 × 400 m relay	3:08.9

== Personal bests ==
- 400 metres – 46.2h (1972)
