= Athletics at the 1971 Pan American Games – Women's javelin throw =

Women's javelin throw at the Pan American Games

The women's javelin throw event at the 1971 Pan American Games was held in Cali on 5 August.

== Results ==
Rank	Name	Nationality	Result	Notes
1st place, gold medalist(s)	Tomasa Núñez	Cuba	54.02	GR
2nd place, silver medalist(s)	Sherry Calvert	United States	51.52	
3rd place, bronze medalist(s)	Roberta Brown	United States	50.94	
4	Milagros Bayard	Cuba	48.68	
5	Rosa Molina	Chile	43.68	
6	Celina Surga	Venezuela	42.20	
7	Delia Vera	Peru	39.86	
8	Julieta Scurzoni	Argentina	37.58	
9	María Streber	Nicaragua	32.86	
	Ivelisse Gómez	Dominican Republic	NM	
	Jay Dahlgren	Canada	DNS	
