= Athletics at the 1970 Summer Universiade – Men's 4 × 400 metres relay =

The men's 4 × 400 metres relay event at the 1970 Summer Universiade was held at the Stadio Comunale in Turin on 6 September 1970.

== Records ==
Standing records prior to the 1970 Summer Universiade
| World record | United States | 2:56.2 | Mexico City, Mexico | 20 October 1968 |
| Universiade record | West Germany | 3:06.7 | Tokyo, Japan | 1967 |

== Results ==
| Rank | Nation | Athletes | Time | Notes |
|---|---|---|---|---|
| 1st place, gold medalist(s) | United States | Tom Ulan, Roger Colgrazier, Tommie Turner, Larry James | 3:03.3 | UR |
| 2nd place, silver medalist(s) | Soviet Union | Yevgeniy Borisenko, Yuriy Zorin, Borys Savchuk, Aleksandr Bratchikov | 3:04.2 | |
| 3rd place, bronze medalist(s) | France | Patrice Viel, Christian Nicolau, Gilles Bertould, Jacques Carette | 3:04.4 | |
| 4 | Great Britain | Jim Aukett, Martin Reynolds, David Hemery, Martin Winbolt-Lewis | 3:05.3 | |
| 5 | West Germany | Siegfried Götz, Herbert Moser, Roland Rossmeissl, Martin Jellinghaus | 3:06.3 | |
| 6 | Italy | Claudio Trachelio, Alessandro Scatena, Gian Lorenzo Cellerino, Furio Fusi | 3:08.3 | |
| 7 | Cuba | Antonio Álvarez, Leandro Civil, José Triana Pérez, Rodobaldo Díaz | 3:09.5 | |
| 8 | Portugal | Eduardo Marques, Mario Oliveira, João Merlin Nobre, Joaquím Paralta | 3:17.4 | |
