= Euric Bobb =

Trinidad and Tobago athlete

Euric Allan Bobb (born 31 October 1943) is an economist and former athlete from Trinidad and Tobago.

== Athletics ==
As an athlete he specialized in the 400 metres. He finished sixth in the 4 × 400 metres relay at the 1968 Summer Olympics, together with teammates Benedict Cayenne, Edwin Roberts and George Simon.

== Career ==
Bobb was born in Trinidad and educated at Presentation College and Sidney Sussex College, Cambridge, where in 1966 he obtained a degree in economics. After retiring from athletics he was appointed as the Governor of the Central Bank of Trinidad and Tobago from 1984 to 1988. In 1994, he was awarded the Trinidad & Tobago Chaconia Gold Medal for outstanding public service.
