= Byron Dyce =

Jamaican middle-distance runner

Personal information
- Nationality: Jamaican
- Born: 27 March 1948 (age 78) Jamaica
- Height: 178 cm (5 ft 10 in)
- Weight: 67 kg (148 lb)

Sport
- Sport: Athletics
- Event: middle-distance
- Club: New York University Violets
Medal record
Men's Athletics
Representing Jamaica
Pan American Games
Bronze medal – third place	1971 Cali	800 metres
Central American and Caribbean Games
Gold medal – first place	1970 Panama City	1500 metres

Byron Dyce (born 27 March 1948) is a Jamaican former middle-distance runner who competed in the 1968 Summer Olympics and in the 1972 Summer Olympics. He is still the current Jamaican National Record holder in the Mile and 1000 metres. He still holds the NYU school record in the Indoor 800 metres.

Dyce finished second behind Steve Ovett in the 800 metres event at the British 1974 AAA Championships.

The Millrose Games have named their annual collegiate Distance medley relay in his honor. Dyce, who ran for NYU, is considered a legend among New York track and field circles. After receiving his Ph.D. degree at the University of Florida, he is currently a mathematics professor at Santa Fe College in Gainesville, Florida.

== International competitions ==
Year	Competition	Venue	Position	Event	Notes
Representing Jamaica
1967	Pan American Games	Winnipeg, Canada	5th	1500 m	3:46.61
1968	Olympic Games	Mexico City, Mexico	10th (sf)	800 m	1:47.2
1968	Olympic Games	Mexico City, Mexico	27th (h)	1500 m	3:54.65
1970	Central American and Caribbean Games	Panama City, Panama	1st	1500 m	3:45.8
1970	British Commonwealth Games	Edinburgh, United Kingdom	6th (sf)	800 m	1:49.7
1970	British Commonwealth Games	Edinburgh, United Kingdom	5th	4 × 400 m relay	3:06.4
1971	Central American and Caribbean Championships	Kingston, Jamaica	1st	800 m	1:49.7
1971	Central American and Caribbean Championships	Kingston, Jamaica	1st	1500 m	3:46.1
1971	Pan American Games	Cali, Colombia	3rd	800 m	1:48.42
1971	Pan American Games	Cali, Colombia	18th (h)	1500 m	4:25.10
1972	Olympic Games	Munich, West Germany	16th (h)	800 m	1:48.0
1972	Olympic Games	Munich, West Germany	48th (h)	1500 m	3:45.9
1975	Central American and Caribbean Championships	Ponce, Puerto Rico	1st	800 m	1:58.1
1975	Central American and Caribbean Championships	Ponce, Puerto Rico	3rd	1500 m	3:49.4

== Personal bests ==
Outdoors

- 800 metres – 1:45.2h (Knoxville 1969)
- 1000 metres – 2:17.0h (Copenhagen 1973) NR
- 1500 metres – 3:40.0h (Oslo 1975)
- Mile – 3:57.34 (Stockholm 1974) NR

Indoors

- 800 metres – 1:50.6h (Boston 1970)
- 1500 metres – 3:40.7h (New York 1974) NR
- Mile – 4:02.8h (Detroit 1971)
