= Kenya at the 1968 Summer Olympics =

- IOC code: KEN
- NOC: National Olympic Committee of Kenya
- Website: teamkenya.or.ke

in Mexico City
- Competitors: 39 (36 men, 3 women) in 4 sports
- Medals Ranked 14th: Gold 3 Silver 4 Bronze 2 Total 9

Summer Olympics appearances (overview)
- 1956; 1960; 1964; 1968; 1972; 1976–1980; 1984; 1988; 1992; 1996; 2000; 2004; 2008; 2012; 2016; 2020; 2024

Kenya competed at the 1968 Summer Olympics in Mexico City, Mexico. 39 competitors, 36 men and 3 women, took part in 22 events in 4 sports.

== Medalists ==
=== Gold ===
- Kipchoge Keino — Athletics, Men's 1500 metres
- Naftali Temu — Athletics, Men's 10000 metres
- Amos Biwott — Athletics, Men's 3000 metre steeplechase

=== Silver ===
- Wilson Kiprugut — Athletics, Men's 800 metres
- Kipchoge Keino — Athletics, Men's 5000 metres
- Benjamin Kogo — Athletics, Men's 3000 metre steeplechase
- Daniel Rudisha, Charles Asati, Naftali Bon, and Munyoro Nyamau — Paul Mose; Athletics, Men's 4×400 metre relay

=== Bronze ===
- Naftali Temu — Athletics, Men's 5000 metres
- Philip Waruinge — Boxing, Men's Featherweight

== Shooting ==
Three shooters, all men, represented Kenya in 1968.

25 m pistol

- Leonard Bull

50 m rifle, prone

- Dismus Onyiego
- John Harun

== See also ==
1968 in athletics
