= Larry James =

American track athlete

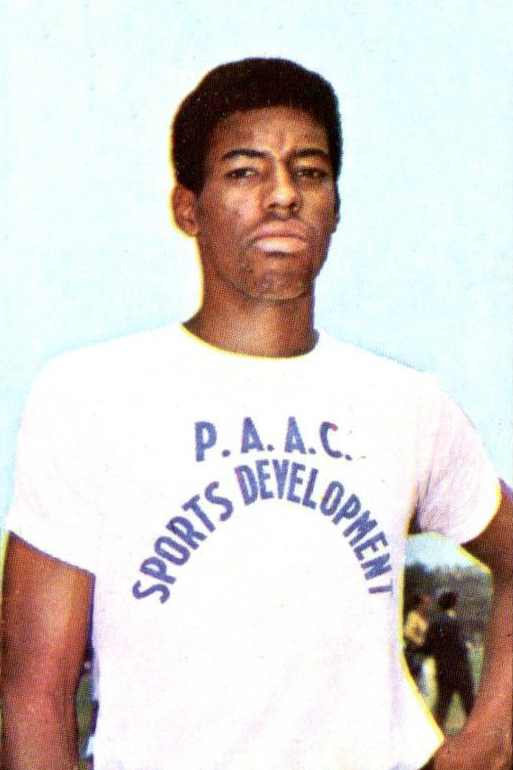
- James in 1968

Personal information
- Full name: George Lawrence James
- Born: November 6, 1947 Mount Pleasant, New York, U.S.
- Died: November 6, 2008 (aged 61) Galloway Township, New Jersey, U.S.
- Height: 1.81 m (5 ft 11 in)
- Weight: 70 kg (154 lb)

Sport
- Sport: Athletics
- Events: 400 m, 400 m hurdles
- Club: Villanova Wildcats

Achievements and titles
- Personal bests: 400 m – 43.97 (1968); 400 mH – 50.2 (1970)
Medal record
Men's athletics
Representing the United States
Olympic Games
Gold medal – first place	1968 Mexico City	4 × 400 m relay
Silver medal – second place	1968 Mexico City	400 m
Summer Universiade
Gold medal – first place	1970 Turin	400 m hurdles
Gold medal – first place	1970 Turin	4 × 400 m relay

George Lawrence James (November 6, 1947 – November 6, 2008), was an American track athlete. At the 1968 Olympics he won a gold medal in the 4 × 400 m relay and a silver in the individual 400 m.

== Biography ==
=== Early life ===
James was born on November 6, 1947, in Mount Pleasant, New York, and took up track in seventh grade. He attended White Plains High School, where he competed in the intermediate hurdles and the triple jump, and was a member of relay teams that set national records.

=== Athlete ===
A double medalist at the 1968 Summer Olympics in Mexico City, James also set world records and won NCAA titles during his track career. James won the silver medal in the 400 m with his time of 43.97 seconds at the 1968 Summer Olympics, bettering the existing world record but placing him second behind teammate (and fellow Hall of Famer) Lee Evans (43.86). James added a gold medal at the Mexico City Games by running the third leg on the U.S. 4 × 400 m relay team, which set a world record of 2:56.16 seconds, which was eventually tied in 1988 but was not beaten until 1992.

James, at the age of 20 years and 10 months, set the 400 m world record of 44.1 seconds in placing second to Evans at the 1968 Olympic Trials at Echo Summit, California, when Evans' winning time of 44.0 was disallowed by the IAAF because he wore illegal brush spike shoes. James was a double gold medalist at the 1970 World University Games, winning the 400 m hurdles and running the anchor leg on Team USA's 4 × 400 m relay team (3:03.33). As a collegian at Villanova University under Hall of Fame coach Jumbo Elliott, James won the NCAA Men's Outdoor Track and Field Championship 440 yd title in 1970 and NCAA Men's Indoor Track and Field Championship crowns at that distance in 1968, 1969 and 1970. At the 1968 Penn Relays, his anchor leg of 43.9 was the fastest ever run in the history of the relay carnival and sparked Villanova's scintillating comeback victory over Rice University. His finish in this race is pictured on the cover of the May 1968 issue of Track and Field News.

=== Coaching ===
The head manager for Team USA at the 2003 World Outdoor Championships, James was chair of USATF's budget committee and had recently retired after 28 years as the Dean of Athletics and Recreational Programs and Services at the Richard Stockton College of New Jersey. The soccer and track-and-field stadium at the College is named for him, and features a large touchstone at its entrance.

In addition to the bachelor's degree in business administration that he earned from Villanova, James received a Master of Public Policy in 1987 from Rutgers University.

In 2003, James was inducted into the National Track and Field Hall of Fame.

He died on his 61st birthday on November 6, 2008, at his home in Galloway Township, New Jersey of colon cancer.
