= Len Walters =

Len Walters may refer to:

- Leonard Walters (born 1931), Canadian boxer
- Len Walters (athlete) (born 1947), English athlete
