= Robert Ouko =

Robert Ouko may refer to:

- Robert Ouko (politician) (1931–1990), Foreign Minister of Kenya
- Robert Ouko (athlete) (1948–2019), Kenyan athlete
