= Tomasa Núñez =

Cuban javelin thrower

Medal record

Women's athletics

Representing Cuba

Pan American Games
Gold medal – first place	1971 Cali	Shot put

Central American and Caribbean Games
Gold medal – first place	1970 Panama City	Shot put
Gold medal – first place	1974 Santo Domingo	Shot put

Tomasa Ana Núñez Abreu (17 April 1951 – 30 December 1981) was a Cuban track and field athlete who competed in the javelin throw. She was Cuba's first gold medallist in the javelin at the Pan American Games, gaining that title in 1971. Her personal best of 54.64 m (179 ft 3 in) is a former Panamerican record. She won four titles at regional level at the Central American and Caribbean Games in 1970 and 1974, as well as being the 1971 and 1973 champion at the Central American and Caribbean Championships in Athletics.

== Career ==
Born in Yaguajay, Cuba to Juan Núñez and Dominga Abreu, she was the fifth of nine children. Núñez decided to take up athletics in her early teenage years and quickly emerged as a quality thrower with a gold medal at the 1966 Cuban National Scholastic Games after training in Cienfuegos at the School for Student Sport Development (Escuela de Iniciación Deportiva Escolar).

Her first major medal came at age eighteen at the 1969 Central American and Caribbean Championships in Athletics, which was held in Havana that year. She took the silver medal behind fellow Cuban Milagros Bayard. Núñez quickly became a dominant force in women's javelin in the region. She defeated the two-time defending champion Hilda Ramírez at the 1970 Central American and Caribbean Games, setting a games record of 45.64 m (149 ft 8 3/4 in) in the process. Her lifetime best mark of 54.64 m (179 ft 3 in) was achieved that year in Havana on 24 January. This was a Panamerican record at the time, marking her as the best women's thrower in the Americas.

Núñez confirmed her place at the top of the region with two major victories in 1971. The 1971 Central American and Caribbean Championships in Athletics saw her soundly beat defending champion Milagros Bayard by a margin of over ten metres in a championship record of 51.64 m (169 ft 5 in). Dominance over the best American throwers followed a month later at the 1971 Pan American Games: a games record of 54.02 m (177 ft 2 3/4 in) left her comfortably as the gold medallist ahead of Sherry Calvert and Roberta Brown. This achievement made her Cuba's first ever Pan American javelin champion of either sex. Her victory marked the beginning of a long period of success of Cuban women in the event, with María Caridad Colón, Ivonne Leal, Dulce García, Xiomara Rivero and Osleidys Menéndez keeping the title in Cuban hands from 1979 to 1999. Colón and Menéndez built upon Núñez's legacy by raising it to a global level, becoming Olympic champions.

She did not compete at the 1972 Summer Olympics, but continued her success by defending her two regional titles. She bested Bayard again at the 1973 Central American and Caribbean Championships in Athletics, then narrowly defeated yet another Cuban María Beltrán to win the Central American and Caribbean Games in 1974. Beltrán and Colón were the ones to later succeed Núñez to those titles. The women's javelin title remained with Cuba from 1967 to 1987 at the CAC Championships while the CAC Games women's javelin was an exclusively Cuba affair for even longer, from 1962 to 1998.

She retired from the sport in 1976, having fallen down the national rankings and placed third at the Copa Cuba meet. She took up javelin coaching afterwards in Havana. She married Roberto Lammoglia Castillo and the couple had their first child, a daughter, Yisel Lammoglia, in 1977. Núñez died of a sudden illness in 1981 at the age of thirty and was buried at Cementerio de Colón. She was awarded the Order of Ana Betancourt medal by the Federation of Cuban Women in honour of her achievements.

== International competitions ==
Year	Competition	Venue	Position	Notes
1969	Central American and Caribbean Championships	Havana, Cuba	2nd	42.72 m
1970	Central American and Caribbean Games	Panama City, Panama	1st	45.64 m GR
1971	Central American and Caribbean Championships	Kingston, Jamaica	1st	51.64 m CR
1971	Pan American Games	Cali, Colombia	1st	54.02 m
1973	Central American and Caribbean Championships	Maracaibo, Venezuela	1st	51.62 m
1974	Central American and Caribbean Games	Santo Domingo, Dominican Republic	1st	47.58 m GR
