= Kent Bernard =

Trinidadian athlete (1942–2025)

Olympic medal record

Men's Athletics
Bronze medal – third place	1964 Tokyo	4×400-metre relay

Kent Bede Bernard (27 May 1942 – 19 February 2025) was a Trinidadian athlete who competed mainly in the 400 metres.

Bernard competed for Trinidad and Tobago in the 1964 Summer Olympics held in Tokyo, Japan in the 4 × 400-metre relay where he won the bronze medal with his teammates Edwin Skinner, Edwin Roberts, and Wendell Mottley. He also ran track for and graduated from the University of Michigan.

Bernard died on 19 February 2025, at the age of 82.

== International competitions ==
Year	Competition	Venue	Position	Event	Notes
Representing Trinidad and Tobago
1964	Olympic Games	Tokyo, Japan	13th (sf)	400 m	46.9
1964	Olympic Games	Tokyo, Japan	3rd	4 × 400 m relay	3:01.7
1966	Central American and Caribbean Games	San Juan, Puerto Rico	–	400 m	DNF
1966	British Empire and Commonwealth Games	Kingston, Jamaica	2nd	440 y	46.06
1966	British Empire and Commonwealth Games	Kingston, Jamaica	1st	4 × 440 y relay	3:02.8
1970	British Commonwealth Games	Edinburgh, United Kingdom	5th	400 m	46.0
1970	British Commonwealth Games	Edinburgh, United Kingdom	2nd	4 × 400 m relay	3:05.49
1971	Pan American Games	Cali, Colombia	7th	400 m	47.43
1971	Pan American Games	Cali, Colombia	3rd	4 × 400 m relay	3:04.58

== Soures ==
- Sports Reference
