= Eddy Téllez =

Cuban sprinter

Personal information
- Full name: Eduardo Antonio Téllez Valerino
- Nationality: Cuban
- Born: 3 November 1943 (age 82) Manzanillo, Cuba
- Height: 1.80 m (5 ft 11 in)
- Weight: 70 kg (154 lb)

Sport
- Sport: Sprinting
- Event: 400 metres

Eduardo Antonio 'Eddy' Téllez Valerino (born 3 November 1943) is a retired Cuban sprinter. He competed in the men's 400 metres at the 1968 Summer Olympics.

== International competitions ==
Year	Competition	Venue	Position	Event	Notes
Representing Cuba
1966	Central American and Caribbean Games	San Juan, Puerto Rico	15th (h)	400 m	49.7
1966	Central American and Caribbean Games	San Juan, Puerto Rico	5th	4 × 400 m relay	3:13.5
1968	Olympic Games	Mexico City, Mexico	31st (h)	400 m	46.80
1968	Olympic Games	Mexico City, Mexico	9th (h)	4 × 400 m relay	3:05.28

== Personal bests ==
- 400 metres – 46.5h (1969)
