= Radhames =

Radhames is the name of:

- Radhames Ivan Almonte (born 1981), Dominican basketball player
- Radhames Aracena (1930–1999), Dominican radio host, music producer and businessman
- Radhames Dykhoff (born 1974), Aruban baseball pitcher
- Radhames Liz (born 1983), Dominican baseball pitcher
- Radhamés Mora (born 1948), Dominican hurdler and sprinter
