= Radhamés Mora =

Dominican Republic sprinter (born 1948)

Personal information
- Full name: Radhamés E. Mora
- Nationality: Dominican
- Born: 16 February 1948 (age 78) Santo Domingo, Dominican Republic
- Height: 1.70 m (5 ft 7 in)
- Weight: 77 kg (170 lb)

Sport
- Sport: Sprinting
- Event: 110 metres hurdles

Radhamés E. Mora (born 16 February 1948) is a Dominican hurdler and sprinter. During his career, he was selected to be part of the Dominican Republic's team at the 1968 Summer Olympics. He competed in the men's 110 metres hurdles and the men's 4 × 400 metres relay at the 1968 Summer Olympics, though did not medal in either event.

== Biography ==
Radhamés E. Mora was born on 16 February 1948 Santo Domingo in the Dominican Republic.

As a hurdler and sprinter, Mora was selected to compete for the Dominican Republic at the 1968 Summer Olympics held in Mexico City, Mexico. For his participation, he was entered in the men's 110 metres hurdles and the men's 4 × 400 metres relay.

Mora first competed in the preliminary heats of the men's 110 metres hurdles on 16 October. He raced in the fifth heat against six other athletes, namely: Viktor Balikhin, Alfredo Deza, Marcel Duriez, Sergio Liani, Lubomír Nádeníček, and Alan Pascoe. There, Mora recorded an automatically timed mark of 16.85 seconds and placed last, failing to advance to the semifinals as only the top three of his heat would be able to advance.

The men's 4 × 400 metres relay team for the Dominican Republic consisted of Mora and his teammates, Rolando Gómez, José L'Oficial, and David Soriano. They competed in the preliminary heats of the event on 19 October, competing in the first heat against four other relay teams. Together, they recorded a time 3:19.42 and placed last, failing to advance to the finals as only the top three of the heat and next fastest would be able to advance.
