= Carlos Martínez (sprinter) =

Cuban sprinter

Personal information
- Full name: Carlos Felipe Martínez Diosa
- Nationality: Cuban
- Born: 26 May 1945 (age 80) Vueltas, Cuba
- Height: 1.76 m (5 ft 9 in)
- Weight: 70 kg (154 lb)

Sport
- Sport: Sprinting
- Event: 400 metres

Carlos Felipe Martínez Diosa (born 26 May 1945) is a Cuban sprinter. He competed in the men's 400 metres at the 1968 Summer Olympics.

== International competitions ==
Year	Competition	Venue	Position	Event	Notes
Representing Cuba
1966	Central American and Caribbean Games	San Juan, Puerto Rico	10th (sf)	400 m	50.0
1966	Central American and Caribbean Games	San Juan, Puerto Rico	5th	4 × 400 m relay	3:13.5
1968	Olympic Games	Mexico City, Mexico	41st (h)	400 m	47.28
1968	Olympic Games	Mexico City, Mexico	9th (h)	4 × 400 m relay	3:05.28
1970	Central American and Caribbean Games	Panama City, Panama	5th	400 m hurdles	53.1

== Personal bests ==
- 400 metres – 47.28 (1968)
