= Antonio Álvarez (sprinter) =

Cuban sprinter

Personal information
- Full name: Antonio Álvarez Machado
- Nationality: Cuban
- Born: 9 December 1948 (age 77) Camagüey, Cuba

Sport
- Sport: Athletics
- Event: 400 metres
Medal record
Representing Cuba
Central American and Caribbean Games
Gold medal – first place	1970 Panama City	4x400m relay
Gold medal – first place	1974 Santo Domingo	4x400m relay

Antonio Álvarez Machado (born 9 December 1948) is a retired Cuban sprinter. He won several medals at regional level.

== International competitions ==
Year	Competition	Venue	Position	Event	Notes
Representing Cuba
1969	Central American and Caribbean Championships	Havana, Cuba	3rd	400 m	47.9
1969	Central American and Caribbean Championships	Havana, Cuba	1st	4 × 400 m relay	3:13.1
1970	Central American and Caribbean Games	Panama City, Panama	1st	400 m	46.6
1970	Central American and Caribbean Games	Panama City, Panama	1st	4 × 400 m relay	3:06.4
1970	Universiade	Turin, Italy	5th (sf)	400 m	46.9
1970	Universiade	Turin, Italy	7th	4 × 400 m relay	3:09.5
1971	Central American and Caribbean Championships	Kingston, Jamaica	4th	400 m	47.9
1971	Central American and Caribbean Championships	Kingston, Jamaica	2nd	4 × 400 m relay	3:10.1
1971	Pan American Games	Cali, Colombia	8th	400 m	47.46
1971	Pan American Games	Cali, Colombia	6th	4 × 400 m relay	3:08.9
1973	Central American and Caribbean Championships	Maracaibo, Venezuela	2nd	4 × 400 m relay	3:10.1
1974	Central American and Caribbean Games	Santo Domingo, Dominican Republic	6th	400 m	47.57
1974	Central American and Caribbean Games	Santo Domingo, Dominican Republic	1st	4 × 400 m relay	3:06.36

== Personal bests ==
- 200 metres – 21.6 (Bucharest 1970)
- 400 metres – 47.18 (Cali 1971)
- 400 metres – 46.6h (Panama 1970)
- 800 metres – 1:50.7 (Havana 1974)
- 400 metres hurdles – 53.8 (Camagüey 1977)
