= Rudisha =

Rudisha is a surname of Kenyan origin. Notable people with the surname include:

- David Rudisha (born 1988), Kenyan world champion and record holder over 800 meters
- Daniel Rudisha (born 1945), Kenyan 400 meters runner and Olympic medalist, father of David
