= Dale Alexander (sprinter) =

American sprinter (born 1949)

Olympic medal record

Pan American Games
| Gold medal – first place | 1971 Cali | 4x400 metres relay |

Dale Alexander (born April 28, 1949) is an American former sprinter and middle-distance runner.

== Personal life ==
Alexander is from Nicodemus, Kansas and attended high school in Bogue, Kansas, where he competed in three sports. His third cousin is NFL football player Veryl Switzer.

== Career ==
He first competed for the Butler Grizzlies of Butler Community College for two seasons. He then transferred to Kansas State University, where he was coached by DeLoss Dodds.

Alexander was a multiple-time All-American for the Kansas State Wildcats track and field team, finishing runner-up in the 4 × 880 yards relay at the 1970 NCAA Indoor Track and Field Championships and runner-up in the 600 yards at the 1971 NCAA Indoor Track and Field Championships. He ran multiple distances but preferred the 440 yards to the longer 600 yards.

At the 1971 Pan American Games, Dale won the gold medal leading off the U.S. team in the 4 × 400 m relay.
