= Ben Cayenne =

Benedict Hutchinson "Ben" Cayenne (22 March 1944 – 1 November 2014) was an athlete from Trinidad and Tobago who specialized in the 800 metres and 4 x 400 metres relay reaching the finals in both events at the 1968 Summer Olympics in Mexico City. He was born in Barrackpore, Trinidad and Tobago and graduated from the University of Maryland Eastern Shore in the United States.

After his competitive career ended, Cayenne coached at Swarthmore College in Pennsylvania. He was inducted into the University of Maryland Eastern Shore (UMES) athletics’ Hall of Fame in 1984 and was also inducted into Trinidad and Tobago's Sports Hall of Fame.

== International competitions ==
| Year | Competition | Venue | Position | Event | Notes |
Representing Trinidad and Tobago
| 1966 | Central American and Caribbean Games | San Juan, Puerto Rico | 3rd | 800 m | 1:54.3 |
| 1966 | Central American and Caribbean Games | San Juan, Puerto Rico | 2nd | 4 x 400 m relay | 3:09.4 |
| 1967 | Pan American Games | Winnipeg, Canada | 11th (sf) | 400 m | 47.92 |
| 1967 | Pan American Games | Winnipeg, Canada | 10th (sf) | 800 m | 1:49.3 |
| 1967 | Pan American Games | Winnipeg, Canada | 6th | 4 × 400 m relay | 3:10.82 |
| 1968 | Olympic Games | Mexico City, Mexico | 8th | 800 m | 1:54.3 |
| 1968 | Olympic Games | Mexico City, Mexico | 6th | 4 × 400 m relay | 3:04.5 |
| 1970 | British Commonwealth Games | Edinburgh, United Kingdom | 2nd | 800 m | 1:47.42 |
| 1970 | British Commonwealth Games | Edinburgh, United Kingdom | 2nd | 4 × 400 m relay | 3:05.49 |
| 1971 | Pan American Games | Cali, Colombia | 7th | 800 m | 1:51.95 |
| 1971 | Pan American Games | Cali, Colombia | 3rd | 4 × 400 m relay | 3:04.58 |
