= Fanahan McSweeney =

Irish sprinter

Personal information
- Nationality: Irish
- Born: 21 August 1947 Castletownroche, Cork, Ireland
- Died: 27 July 1995 (aged 47)
- Height: 183 cm (6 ft 0 in)
- Weight: 76 kg (168 lb)

Sport
- Sport: Athletics
- Event: Sprinting/400 metres
- Club: Grange Fermoy AC

Fanahan McSweeney (21 August 1947 – 27 July 1995) was an Irish sprinter. He competed in the men's 400 metres at the 1972 Summer Olympics.

McSweeney finished second behind Martin Bilham in the 400 metres event at the British 1970 AAA Championships and third behind David Jenkins at the 1974 AAA Championships.
