= Elbert Stinson =

American sprinter

Medal record

Men's Athletics

Representing the United States

Pan American Games
Gold medal – first place	1967 Winnipeg	4x400 metres relay

Elbert Stinson (born September 4, 1944) is an American former sprinter. He won the gold medal in the 4 × 400 metres relay at the 1967 Pan American Games.
