= Ron Freeman =

American athlete

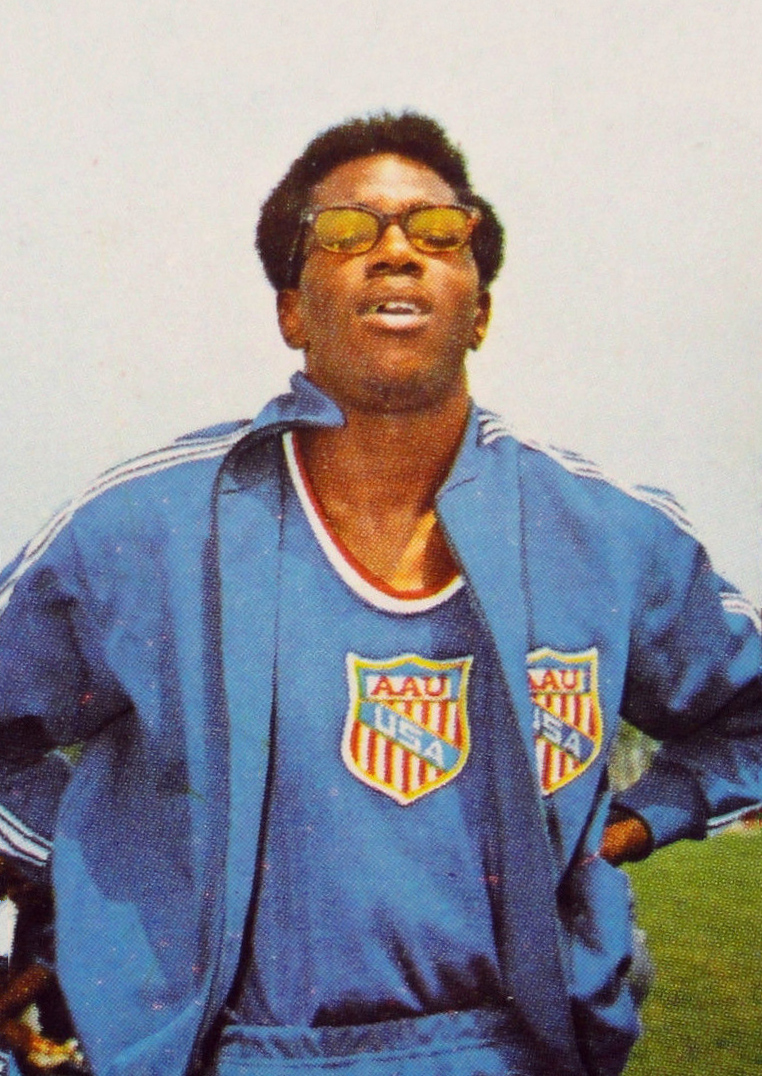
- Freeman in 1968

Personal information
- Full name: Ronald John Freeman III
- Born: June 12, 1947 (age 79) Elizabeth, New Jersey, U.S.
- Height: 6 ft 0 in (1.83 m)
- Weight: 181 lb (82 kg)

Sport
- Sport: Athletics
- Event: 400 m
- Club: Arizona State Sun Devils track and field

Achievements and titles
- Personal bests: 220 yd – 21.2 (1963); 400 m – 44.41 (1968); 880 yd – 1:50.4 (1968)
Medal record
Men's athletics
Representing the United States
Olympic Games
Gold medal – first place	1968 Mexico City	4 × 400 m relay
Bronze medal – third place	1968 Mexico City	400 metres (Note: Freeman ran the fastest 400 meter relay leg in the history of the Olympic Games which stood for more than 25 years.)

Ronald John Freeman III (born June 12, 1947, in Elizabeth, New Jersey) is an American former athlete. At the 1968 Summer Olympics, Freeman won a gold medal in the 4 × 400 m relay and a bronze medal in the 400 meters. Freeman ran the second leg on the American 4 × 400 m relay team, which won the gold medal with a new world record of 2.56.16. His relay leg time (43.2s) was the fastest 4 × 400 meter relay leg ever run and his time stood for more than 25 years.

Raised in Elizabeth, Freeman attended Thomas Jefferson High School and Arizona State University.

Freeman finished second behind Adrian Metcalfe in the 440 yards event at the British 1963 AAA Championships.

He is sometimes confused with Ron Freeman (born 1940), an All-American 400 metres runner in 1963 who also ran for Arizona State and set an earlier world record in the mile relay. Ron Freeman III, born seven years later from New Jersey, was an All-American five years later for the Sun Devils in 1968; the two are not related.

== Awards ==
In August 2017, Freeman received the Athletes in Excellence Award from The Foundation for Global Sports Development in recognition of his community service efforts and work with youth.
