= Dick Drescher =

American discus thrower

Personal information
- Full name: Richard Drescher
- Born: February 2, 1946 (age 80)

Sport
- Sport: Track and field
- Event: Discus throw
Medal record
Men's athletics
Representing the United States
Pan American Games
Gold medal – first place	1971 Cali	Discus

Richard "Dick" Drescher (born February 2, 1946) is a retired male track and field athlete from the United States. He competed in the men's discus throw during his career. Drescher set his personal best in the discus throw event (63.90 metres) at the Mt. SAC Relays in Walnut on April 24, 1976.
