= Carlos Castro (sprinter) =

Mexican sprinter

Personal information
- Full name: Carlos Castro Sedano
- Born: 7 January 1949 (age 76) Sonora Mexico

Sport
- Sport: Sprinting
- Event: 4 × 400 metres relay

Carlos Castro Sedano (born 7 January 1949) is a Mexican sprinter. He competed in the men's 4 × 400 metres relay at the 1968 Summer Olympics.
