= Julius Sang =

Kenyan sprinter

Personal information
- Born: 30 June 1946 Kapsabet, Kenya
- Died: 9 April 2004 (aged 57) Eldoret, Kenya

Sport
- Sport: Track and field
Medal record
Representing Kenya
Olympic Games
Gold medal – first place	1972 Munich	4×400m relay
Bronze medal – third place	1972 Munich	400 metres
Commonwealth Games
Gold medal – first place	1970 Edinburgh	4x400m relay
Gold medal – first place	1974 Christchurch	4x400m relay
African Championships
Gold medal – first place	1985 Cairo	4×400m relay

Julius Sang (19 September 1948 – 9 April 2004) was a Kenyan athlete. Along with teammates Robert Ouko, Charles Asati and Munyoro Nyamau, he won the 4 × 400 relay race at the 1972 Summer Olympics for Kenya. He also took a bronze medal in the individual 400 meter race.

He ran for North Carolina Central University, where he was part of their record-setting team at the Penn Relays. Sang was married to fellow runner Tecla Chemabwai Sang. In 2004, he unexpectedly died while he was undergoing treatment for a stomach ailment.
