= Mike Hauck =

British sprinter

Personal information
- Nationality: British (English)
- Born: 5 March 1945 (age 81) Harrow, London, Great Britain

Sport
- Sport: Athletics
- Event: Sprinting
- Club: Thames Valley Harriers
Medal record
Athletics
Representing Great Britain
Summer Universiade
Silver medal – second place	1967 Tokyo	4x400m relay
Bronze medal – third place	1967 Tokyo	4x100m relay
Representing England
Commonwealth Games
Bronze medal – third place	1970 Edinburgh	4 x 400m relay

Michael Arthur Hauck (born 5 March 1945), is a male former athlete who competed for England at the Commonwealth Games.

== Biography ==
Hauck attended Harrow Weald County Grammar School and studied Philosophy, Politics, and Economic at the St Catherine's College, Oxford, where he gained a blue and was the athletics president.

He lived at 45 Dudley Gardens in Harrow and was a member of the Thames Valley Harriers.

Hauck represented the England team at the 1970 British Commonwealth Games in Edinburgh, Scotland. He competed in the men's 4 × 400 metres relay, winning a bronze medal with Martin Bilham, Len Walters and John Sherwood.
