= Mike Mason (long jumper) =

Canadian long jumper (born 1948)

Personal information
- Born: June 2, 1948 (age 78)
- Education: North Toronto Collegiate Institute; Simon Fraser University

Sport
- Sport: Athletics
- Event: Long jump
Medal record
Representing Canada
Pan American Games
Bronze medal – third place	1971 Cali	Long jump

Mike Mason (born June 2, 1948) is a Canadian former athlete who competed in the long jump.

A native of Toronto, Mason attended North Toronto Collegiate Institute and took up an athletics scholarship to Simon Fraser University, where he holds the long jump record. He trained with Scarborough Central Lions.

Mason was the Canadian national long jump champion in 1970 and 1971. He won a bronze medal in long jump at the 1971 Pan American Games, finishing behind Americans Arnie Robinson and Bouncy Moore.
