= George Simon (athlete) =

Trinidad and Tobago sprinter

George Simon (March 14, 1942 - April 18, 2026) was an athlete from Trinidad and Tobago, born in St. George's, Grenada.

== International competitions ==
Year	Competition	Venue	Position	Event	Notes
Representing Trinidad and Tobago
1967	Pan American Games	Winnipeg, Canada	14th (sf)	200 m	21.71
1967	Pan American Games	Winnipeg, Canada	6th	4 × 400 m relay	3:10.82
1968	Olympic Games	Mexico City, Mexico	47th (h)	400 m	47.95
1968	Olympic Games	Mexico City, Mexico	6th	4 × 400 m relay	3:04.5
1970	Central American and Caribbean Games	Panama City, Panama	5th	4 × 100 m relay	41.6
1970	Central American and Caribbean Games	Panama City, Panama	3rd (h)	4 × 400 m relay	3:17.0

== Personal bests ==
- 400 metres – 47.95 A (Mexico City 1968)
