= Tony Harper (athlete) =

Bermudian sprinter (1938–2013)

Personal information
- Nationality: Bermudian
- Born: 6 December 1938
- Died: 17 April 2013 (aged 74)

Sport
- Sport: Sprinting
- Event: 400 metres

Anthony 'Tony' M. Harper (6 December 1938 – 17 April 2013) was a Bermudian sprinter. He competed in the men's 400 metres at the 1968 Summer Olympics.
