= Tegegne Bezabeh =

Ethiopian sprinter (born 1941)

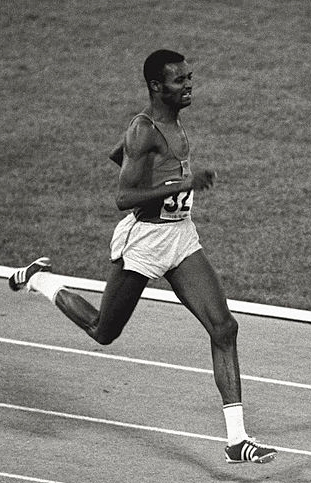
- Tegegne Bezabeh at the 1968 Olympics

Personal information
- Born: 9 September 1941 (age 84) Boran, Ethiopia
- Height: 1.83 m (6 ft 0 in)
- Weight: 65 kg (143 lb)

Sport
- Sport: Sprint running

Achievements and titles
- Personal best(s): 200 m – 22.03 (1964); 400 m – 45.42 (1968)

Tegegne Bezabeh (born 9 September 1941) is a retired Ethiopian sprinter. He competed at the 1964, 1968 and 1972 Olympics in the 400 m event with the best achievement of sixth place in 1968.

His best time (45.42) on 400 meter is also current Ethiopian record.
