= David Soriano =

Dominican Republic sprinter

Personal information
- Nationality: Dominican
- Born: 26 June 1944 (age 82)

Sport
- Sport: Sprinting
- Event: 4 × 400 metres relay

David Soriano (born 26 June 1944) is a Dominican Republic sprinter. He competed in the men's 4 × 400 metres relay at the 1968 Summer Olympics.
