= Athletics at the 1970 British Commonwealth Games =

Athletics at the 9th British Commonwealth Games
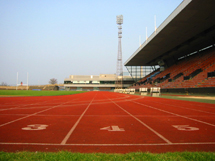
- The track and the athletics main stadium.
- Dates: 17–25 July 1970
- Host city: Edinburgh, Scotland
- Venue: Meadowbank Stadium
- Level: Senior
- Events: 36
- Participation: 534 athletes from 34 nations
- Records set: 1 WR, 2 GR

At the 1970 British Commonwealth Games, the athletics events were held at the Meadowbank Stadium in Edinburgh, Scotland. A total of 36 events were contested, of which 23 by male and 13 by female athletes. This was the first athletics competition at the British Commonwealth Games to feature events in metric units, rather than imperial units. One world record and two Games records were broken at the competition.

== Medal summary ==
=== Men ===
Men's track and road events
Event	Gold		Silver		Bronze	
Event	Athlete	Time	Athlete	Time	Athlete	Time
100 metres (wind: +3.6 m/s)	Don Quarrie; Jamaica	10.24w	Lennox Miller; Jamaica	10.32w	Hasely Crawford; Trinidad and Tobago	10.33w
200 metres (wind: +1.7 m/s)	Don Quarrie; Jamaica	20.56	Edwin Roberts; Trinidad and Tobago	20.69	Charles Asati; Kenya	20.74
400 metres	Charles Asati; Kenya	45.01	Ross Wilson; Australia	45.61	Saimoni Tamani; Fiji	45.82
800 metres	Robert Ouko; Kenya	1:46.89	Ben Cayenne; Trinidad and Tobago	1:47.42	William Smart; Canada	1:47.43
1500 metres	Kip Keino; Kenya	3:36.68	Dick Quax; New Zealand	3:38.19	Brendan Foster; England	3:40.63
5000 metres	Ian Stewart; Scotland	13:22.85	Ian McCafferty; Scotland	13:23.34	Kip Keino; Kenya	13:27.6
10,000 metres	Lachie Stewart; Scotland	28:11.72	Ron Clarke; Australia	28:13.45	Dick Taylor; England	28:15.35
Marathon	Ron Hill; England	2:09:28	Jim Alder; Scotland	2:12:04	Don Faircloth; England	2:12:19
110 metres hurdles (wind: +2.9 m/s)	David Hemery; England	13.66w	Mal Baird; Australia	13.86w	Godfrey Murray; Jamaica	14.02w
400 metres hurdles	John Sherwood; England	50.03	William Koskei; Uganda	50.15	Charles Kipkemboi Yego; Kenya	50.19
3000 metres steeplechase	Tony Manning; Australia	8:26.2	Ben Jipcho; Kenya	8:29.6	Amos Biwott; Kenya	8:30.8
4 × 100 metres relay	Jamaica; Errol Stewart; Lennox Miller; Carl Lawson; Don Quarrie	39.46	Ghana; Michael Ahey; James Addy; Edward Owusu; George Daniels	39.82	England; Ian Green; Martin Reynolds; Dave Dear; Brian Green	40.05
4 × 400 metres relay	Kenya; Munyoro Nyamau; Julius Sang; Robert Ouko; Charles Asati	3:03.63	Trinidad and Tobago; Mel Wong Shing; Ben Cayenne; Kent Bernard; Edwin Roberts	3:05.49	England; Martin Bilham; Len Walters; Mike Hauck; John Sherwood	3:05.53
20 miles walk	Noel Freeman; Australia	2:33:33 GR	Bob Gardiner; Australia	2:35:55	Bill Sutherland; Scotland	2:37:24

Men's field events
Event	Gold		Silver		Bronze	
Event	Athlete	Height / Distance	Athlete	Height / Distance	Athlete	Height / Distance
High jump	Lawrie Peckham; Australia	2.14 m	John Hawkins; Canada	2.12 m	Sheikh Faye; The Gambia	2.10 m
Pole vault	Mike Bull; Northern Ireland	5.10 m	Alan Kane; Canada	4.90 m	Robert Raftis; Canada	4.90 m
Long jump	Lynn Davies; Wales	8.06 m (w)	Phil May; Australia	7.94 m (w)	Alan Lerwill; England	7.94 m (w)
Triple jump	Phil May; Australia	16.72 m	Mick McGrath; Australia	16.41 m	Mohinder Singh Gill; India	15.90 m
Shot put	Dave Steen; Canada	19.21 m	Jeff Teale; England	18.43 m	Les Mills; New Zealand	18.40 m
Discus throw	George Puce; Canada	59.02 m	Les Mills; New Zealand	57.84 m	Bill Tancred; England	56.68 m
Hammer throw	Howard Payne; England	67.80 m	Bruce Fraser; England	62.90 m	Barry Williams; England	61.58 m
Javelin throw	Dave Travis; England	79.50 m	John McSorley; England	76.74 m	John FitzSimons; England	73.20 m

Men's mixed events
Event	Gold		Silver		Bronze	
Event	Athlete	Points	Athlete	Points	Athlete	Points
Decathlon	Geoff Smith; Australia	7492	Peter Gabbett; England	7469	Barry King; England	7201

=== Women ===
Women's track events
Event	Gold		Silver		Bronze	
Event	Athlete	Time	Athlete	Time	Athlete	Time
100 metres (wind: +5.3 m/s)	Raelene Boyle; Australia	11.26w	Alice Anum; Ghana	11.32w	Marion Hoffman; Australia	11.36w
200 metres (wind: +4.0 m/s)	Raelene Boyle; Australia	22.75w	Alice Anum; Ghana	22.86w	Margaret Critchley; England	23.16w
400 metres	Marilyn Neufville; Jamaica	51.02 WR	Sandra Brown; Australia	53.66	Judith Ayaa; Uganda	53.77
800 metres	Rosemary Stirling; Scotland	2:06.24	Pat Lowe; England	2:06.27	Cheryl Peasley; Australia	2:06.33
1500 metres	Rita Ridley; England	4:18.8	Joan Page; England	4:19.0	Thelma Fynn; Canada	4:19.1
100 metres hurdles (wind: -0.3 m/s)	Pam Kilborn; Australia	13.27	Maureen Caird; Australia	13.73	Christine Bell; England	13.82
4 × 100 metres relay	Australia; Jennifer Lamy; Pam Kilborn; Marion Hoffman; Raelene Boyle	44.14	England; Anita Neil; Margaret Critchley; Madeleine Cobb; Val Peat	44.28	Canada; Joan Hendry; Joyce Sadowick; Patty Loverock; Stephanie Berto	44.68

Women's field events
Event	Gold		Silver		Bronze	
Event	Athlete	Height / Distance	Athlete	Height / Distance	Athlete	Height / Distance
High jump	Debbie Brill; Canada	1.78 m	Ann Wilson; England	1.70 m	Moira Walls; Scotland	1.70 m
Long jump	Sheila Sherwood; England	6.73 m	Ann Wilson; England	6.50 m	Joan Hendry; Canada	6.28 m
Shot put	Mary Peters; Northern Ireland	15.93 m	Barbara Poulsen; New Zealand	15.87 m	Jean Roberts; Australia	15.32 m
Discus throw	Rosemary Payne; Scotland	54.46 m	Jean Roberts; Australia	51.02 m	Carol Martin; Canada	48.42 m
Javelin throw	Petra Rivers; Australia	52.00 m	Anne Farquhar; England	50.82 m	Jay Dahlgren; Canada	49.54 m

Women's mixed events
Event	Gold		Silver		Bronze	
Event	Athlete	Points	Athlete	Points	Athlete	Points
Pentathlon	Mary Peters; Northern Ireland	5148 GR	Ann Wilson; England	5037	Jenny Meldrum; Canada	4736

== Medal table ==
* Host nation (Scotland)

Medal table, by nation
Rank	Nation	Gold	Silver	Bronze	Total
1	Australia (AUS)	10	9	3	22
2	England (ENG)	7	11	12	30
3	Scotland (SCO)*	4	2	2	8
4	Kenya (KEN)	4	1	4	9
5	Jamaica (JAM)	4	1	1	6
6	Canada (CAN)	3	2	8	13
7	Northern Ireland (NIR)	3	0	0	3
8	Wales (WAL)	1	0	0	1
9	New Zealand (NZL)	0	3	1	4
9	Trinidad and Tobago (TRI)	0	3	1	4
11	Ghana (GHA)	0	3	0	3
12	Uganda (UGA)	0	1	1	2
13	Fiji (FIJ)	0	0	1	1
13	Gambia (GAM)	0	0	1	1
13	India (IND)	0	0	1	1
Totals (15 entries)		36	36	36	108

== Participating nations ==
- Antigua and Barbuda (7)
- Australia (33)
- Bahamas (12)
- Bermuda (2)
- Canada (59)
- Ceylon (1)
- England (92)
- Fiji (1)
- Gambia (6)
- Ghana (12)
- Gibraltar (7)
- Grenada (2)
- Guernsey (5)
- Guyana (2)
- India (9)
- Isle of Man (4)
- Jamaica (22)
- Kenya (18)
- Malawi (7)
- Mauritius (7)
- New Zealand (20)
- Nigeria (21)
- Northern Ireland (19)
- Pakistan (9)
- Saint Lucia (1)
- Scotland (55)
- Sierra Leone (5)
- Singapore (4)
- Swaziland (5)
- Tanzania (8)
- Trinidad and Tobago (12)
- Uganda (15)
- Wales (41)
- Zambia (11)
