= Michael Zerbes =

German sprinter

Personal information
- Nationality: German
- Born: 13 September 1944 (age 81) Dresden, Germany

Sport
- Sport: Sprinting
- Event: 400 metres
Medal record
Men's athletics
Representing East Germany
European Championships
Bronze medal – third place	1966 Budapest	4×400 m

Michael Zerbes (born 13 September 1944) is a German sprinter. He competed in the men's 400 metres at the 1968 Summer Olympics representing East Germany.
