= Athletics at the 1971 Pan American Games =

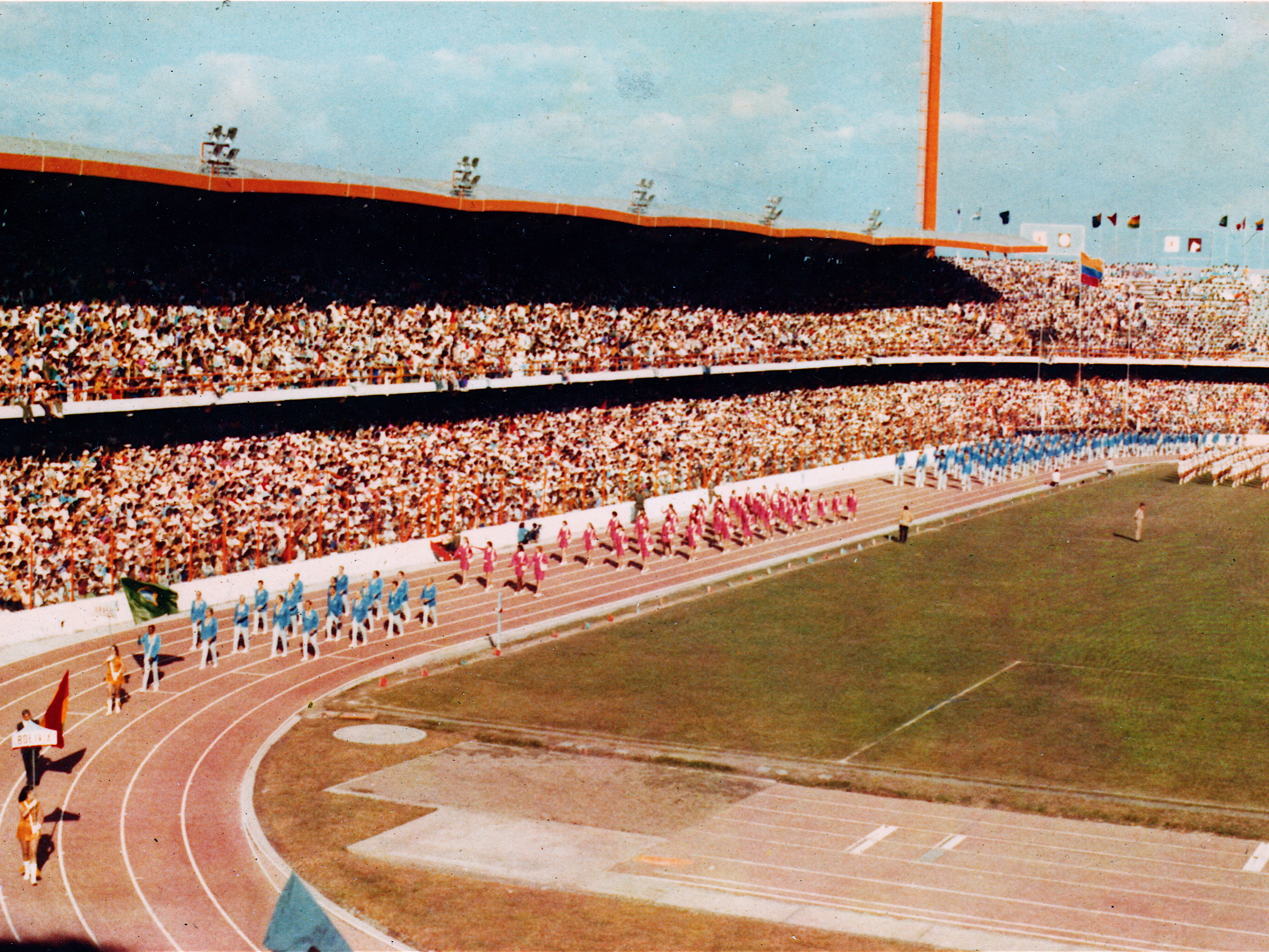
- Dates: 30 July – 5 August
- Host city: Cali, Colombia
- Venue: Estadio Olímpico Pascual Guerrero
- Level: Senior
- Events: 37
- Participation: 375 athletes from 28 nations
- Records set: 1 WR, 19 GR

The athletics competition at the 1971 Pan American Games was held in Estadio Olímpico Pascual Guerrero in Cali, Colombia. At almost exactly 1000 metres elevation, all the marks from this meet marginally qualify as "altitude assisted."

== Medal summary ==
=== Men's events ===
Event	Gold		Silver		Bronze	
100 metres (wind: 0.0 m/s)	Don Quarrie; Jamaica	10.29	Lennox Miller; Jamaica	10.32	Del Meriwether; United States	10.34
200 metres (wind: +1.0 m/s)	Don Quarrie; Jamaica	19.86 GR	Marshall Dill; United States	20.39	Edwin Roberts; Trinidad and Tobago	20.39
400 metres	John Smith; United States	44.60 GR	Fred Newhouse; United States	45.09	Fernando Acevedo; Peru	45.30 NR
800 metres	Ken Swenson; United States	1:48.08 GR	Art Sandison; United States	1:48.42	Byron Dyce; Jamaica	1:48.42
1500 metres	Marty Liquori; United States	3:42.10 GR	Bill Smart; Canada	3:43.39	Jim Crawford; United States	3:43.76
5000 metres	Steve Prefontaine; United States	13:52.53	Steve Stageberg; United States	14:00.76	Mario Pérez; Mexico	14:03.98
10,000 metres	Frank Shorter; United States	28:50.83 GR	Juan Martínez; Mexico	29:05.07	Álvaro Mejía; Colombia	29:06.97
Marathon	Frank Shorter; United States	2:22:40	José García; Mexico	2:26:30	Hernán Barreneche; Colombia	2:27:19
110 metres hurdles (wind: +4.5 m/s)	Rod Milburn; United States	13.46w	Arnaldo Bristol; Puerto Rico	13.81w	Juan Morales; Cuba	13.85w
400 metres hurdles	Ralph Mann; United States	49.11 GR	Jim Seymour; United States	50.36	Jacinto Hidalgo; Venezuela	51.68
3000 metres steeplechase	Mike Manley; United States	8:42.27	Sidney Sink; United States	8:42.90	Héctor Villanueva; Mexico	8:46.09
4 × 100 metres relay	Jamaica; Alfred Daley; Carl Lawson; Lennox Miller; Don Quarrie	39.28	Cuba; Bárbaro Bandomo; Pablo Montes; Juan Morales; Hermes Ramírez	39.84	United States; Willie Deckard; Marshall Dill; Ron Draper; Rod Milburn	39.84
4 × 400 metres relay	United States; Dale Alexander; Fred Newhouse; Tommy Turner; John Smith	3:00.63 GR	Jamaica; Leighton Priestley; Trevor Campbell; Alfred Daley; Garth Case	3:03.98	Trinidad and Tobago; Edwin Roberts; Ben Cayenne; Kent Bernard; Trevor James	3:04.58
20 kilometres walk	Goetz Klopfer; United States	1:37:30	Tom Dooley; United States	1:38:16	José Oliveros; Mexico	1:40:26
50 kilometres walk	Larry Young; United States	4:38:31	Gabriel Hernández; Mexico	4:38:46	John Knifton; United States	4:42:15
High jump	Pat Matzdorf; United States	2.10 m	Wilf Wedmann; Canada	2.10 m	Luis Arbulú; Peru	2.05 m
Pole vault	Jan Johnson; United States	5.33 m	David Roberts; United States	5.20 m	Bruce Simpson; Canada	4.90 m
Long jump	Arnie Robinson; United States	8.02 m	James "Bouncy" Moore; United States	7.98 m	Mike Mason; Canada	7.65 m
Triple jump	Pedro Pérez; Cuba	17.40 m WR	Nelson Prudêncio; Brazil	16.82 m	John Craft; United States	16.32 m
Shot put	Al Feuerbach; United States	19.76 m	Karl Salb; United States	19.10 m	Mike Mercer; Canada	18.01 m
Discus throw	Dick Drescher; United States	62.26 m GR	Tim Vollmer; United States	61.06 m	Ain Roost; Canada	58.06 m
Hammer throw	Al Hall; United States	65.84 m GR	George Frenn; United States	65.68 m	Darwin Piñeyrúa; Uruguay	61.54 m
Javelin throw	Cary Feldmann; United States	81.52 m GR	Bill Skinner; United States	80.36 m	Amado Morales; Puerto Rico	76.14 m
Decathlon	Rick Wanamaker; United States	7648 pts	Russ Hodge; United States	7314 pts	Jesús Mirabal; Cuba	7295 pts

=== Women's events ===
Event	Gold		Silver		Bronze	
100 metres (wind: +3.0 m/s)	Iris Davis; United States	11.25w	Stephanie Berto; Canada	11.40w	Silvia Chivás; Cuba	11.47w
200 metres (wind: 0.0 m/s)	Stephanie Berto; Canada	23.57 =GR	Fulgencia Romay; Cuba	23.70	Esther Stroy; United States	23.82
400 metres	Marilyn Neufville; Jamaica	52.34 GR	Carmen Trustée; Cuba	52.89	Yvonne Saunders; Jamaica	53.13
800 metres	Abby Hoffman; Canada	2:05.54	Doris Brown; United States	2:05.90	Penny Werthner; Canada	2:06.32
100 metres hurdles (wind: +4.4 m/s)	Patty Johnson; United States	13.19w	Marlene Elejalde; Cuba	13.54w	Penny May; Canada	13.70w
4 × 100 metres relay	United States; Orien Brown; Pat Hawkins; Mattiline Render; Iris Davis	44.59	Cuba; Silvia Chivás; Marlene Elejarde; Fulgencia Romay; Carmen Valdés	45.01	Colombia; Aida Ortíz; Ana Maquilón; Elsy Rivas; Juana Mosquera	45.99
4 × 400 metres relay	United States; Esther Stroy; Mavis Laing; Gwen Norman; Cheryl Toussaint	3:32.45 GR	Cuba; Beatriz Castillo; Marcela Chibás; Aurelia Pentón; Carmen Trustée	3:34.04	Jamaica; Beverly Franklin; Ruth Williams; Yvonne Saunders; Marilyn Neufville	3:34.05
High jump	Debbie Brill; Canada	1.85 m GR	Audrey Reid; Jamaica	1.75 m	Andrea Bruce; Jamaica	1.70 m
Long jump	Brenda Eisler; Canada	6.34 m GR	Silvina Pereira; Brazil	6.35 m	Marina Samuells; Cuba	6.14 m
Shot put	Lynn Graham; United States	15.76 m GR	Grecia Hamilton; Cuba	14.63 m	Rosa Molina; Chile	14.50 m
Discus throw	Carmen Romero; Cuba	57.20 m GR	María Cristina Betancourt; Cuba	51.76 m	Carol Martin; Canada	50.04 m
Javelin throw	Tomasa Núñez; Cuba	54.02 m GR	Sherry Calvert; United States	51.52 m	Roberta Brown; United States	50.94 m
Pentathlon	Debbie Van Kiekebelt; Canada	4290 pts	Penny May; Canada	4112 pts	Aída dos Santos; Brazil	3887 pts

== Medal table ==
Rank	Nation	Gold	Silver	Bronze	Total
1	United States	25	16	7	48
2	Canada	5	4	7	16
3	Jamaica	4	3	4	11
4	Cuba	3	8	4	15
5	Mexico	0	3	3	6
6	Brazil	0	2	1	3
7	Puerto Rico	0	1	1	2
8	Colombia	0	0	3	3
9	Peru	0	0	2	2
9	Trinidad and Tobago	0	0	2	2
11	Chile	0	0	1	1
11	Uruguay	0	0	1	1
11	Venezuela	0	0	1	1
Totals (13 entries)		37	37	37	111

== Participating nations ==
- Argentina (25)
- Bahamas (5)
- Barbados (2)
- Bermuda (1)
- Brazil (16)
- Canada (41)
- Chile (12)
- Colombia (29)
- Costa Rica (3)
- Cuba (44)
- Dominican Republic (7)
- Ecuador (1)
- Guatemala (4)
- Guyana (2)
- Haiti (3)
- Jamaica (18)
- Mexico (19)
- Nicaragua (5)
- Panama (3)
- Peru (12)
- Puerto Rico (12)
- El Salvador (1)
- Suriname (2)
- Trinidad and Tobago (11)
- United States (69)
- Virgin Islands (3)
- Uruguay (3)
- Venezuela (22)
