= Edwin Roberts (sprinter) =

Trinidadian runner (born 1941)

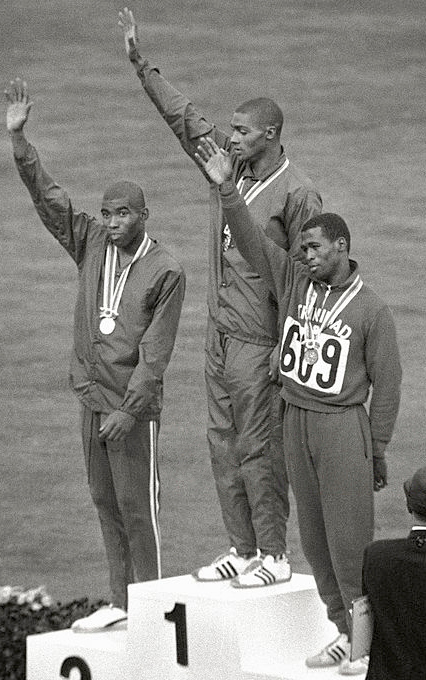
- Edwin Roberts (right) at the 1964 Olympics

Personal information
- Born: Edwin Anthony Roberts; 12 August 1941 (age 85) Belmont, Port-of-Spain, Trinidad
- Height: 1.73 m (5 ft 8 in)
- Weight: 70 kg (154 lb)

Sport
- College team: NCCU Eagles

Achievements and titles
- Personal bests: 100 y: 9.2 s 1964 100 m: 10.1 s 1969; 200 m: 20.34 s 1968 4×400 y: 45.6 s, then WR, 1966
Medal record
Men's Athletics
Representing Trinidad and Tobago
Olympic Games
Bronze medal – third place	1964 Tokyo	200 m
Bronze medal – third place	1964 Tokyo	4×400 m relay
Pan American Games
Bronze medal – third place	1971 Cali	200 m
Bronze medal – third place	1971 Cali	4×400 m
Commonwealth Games
Bronze medal – third place	1966 Kingston	100 yd
Silver medal – second place	1966 Kingston	220 yd
Gold medal – first place	1966 Kingston	4×440 yd
Silver medal – second place	1970 Edinburgh	200 m
Silver medal – second place	1970 Kingston	4×400 m
Central American and Caribbean Games
Bronze medal – third place	1962 Kingston	200 m
Silver medal – second place	1962 Kingston	4×100 m
Silver medal – second place	1962 Kingston	4×400 m
Gold medal – first place	1966 San Juan	200 m
Silver medal – second place	1966 San Juan	100 m
Silver medal – second place	1966 San Juan	4×100 m
Silver medal – second place	1966 San Juan	4×400 m

Edwin Anthony Roberts (born 12 August 1941) is a retired Trinidadian runner. He competed at the 1964, 1968 and 1972 Olympics in various sprint events and had his best results in the 200 m, in which he finished third in 1964 and fourth in 1968. He also won a bronze medal in the 4 × 400 m relay in 1964.

Roberts attended North Carolina College in the United States between 1962 and 1966 where he was a member of the college track team. He was also part of the Trinidadian team that set a world record at 3:02.8 in the 4×440 yd relay at the 1966 Commonwealth Games. He was among world's top ten sprinters from 1964 to 1971, according to the votes of the experts of Track and Field News.

- In 1969 Roberts was awarded the Trinidad & Tobago Humming Bird Medal Bronze.
- In 1977, a picture featuring Edwin Roberts, Su Wen-ho, Motsapi Moorosi and Valeriy Borzov and in the 200 m heats at the 1972 Summer Olympics was selected for the Voyager Golden Record and later launched into space aboard two Voyager spacecraft.
- In 1984, he was inducted into the Alex M. Rivera Athletics Hall of Fame at North Carolina Central University.
- In 1987, he was inducted into the Trinidad and Tobago Sports Hall of Fame.
- In 2005, he was inducted into the Central American and Caribbean Athletic Confederation Hall of Fame.

World Rankings
Year	100 m	200 m
1964	5th	3rd
1965	-	7th
1966	-	4th
1967	-	9th
1968	-	6th
1969	-	4th
1970	-	5th
1971	-	10th

== International competitions ==
Year	Competition	Venue	Position	Event	Notes
Representing Trinidad and Tobago
1962	Central American and Caribbean Games	Kingston, Jamaica	3rd	200 m	21.4
1962	Central American and Caribbean Games	Kingston, Jamaica	2nd	4 × 100 m relay	40.7
1962	Central American and Caribbean Games	Kingston, Jamaica	2nd	4 × 400 m relay	3:12.5
1962	British Empire and Commonwealth Games	Perth, Australia	18th (qf)	100 y	10.0
1962	British Empire and Commonwealth Games	Perth, Australia	13th (qf)	220 y	22.2
1964	Olympic Games	Tokyo, Japan	3rd	200 m	20.6
1964	Olympic Games	Tokyo, Japan	3rd	4 × 400 m relay	3:01.7
1966	Central American and Caribbean Games	San Juan, Puerto Rico	2nd	100 m	10.3
1966	Central American and Caribbean Games	San Juan, Puerto Rico	1st	200 m	20.8
1966	Central American and Caribbean Games	San Juan, Puerto Rico	2nd	4 × 100 m relay	40.6
1966	Central American and Caribbean Games	San Juan, Puerto Rico	2nd	4 × 400 m relay	3:09.4
1966	British Empire and Commonwealth Games	Kingston, Jamaica	3rd	100 y	9.52
1966	British Empire and Commonwealth Games	Kingston, Jamaica	2nd	220 y	20.93
1966	British Empire and Commonwealth Games	Kingston, Jamaica	1st	4 × 440 y relay	3:02.8
1968	Olympic Games	Mexico City, Mexico	4th	200 m	20.34
1968	Olympic Games	Mexico City, Mexico	10th (sf)	4 × 100 m relay	39.5
1968	Olympic Games	Mexico City, Mexico	6th	4 × 400 m relay	3:04.5
1970	Pan American Games	Edinburgh, United Kingdom	2nd	200 m	20.69
1970	Pan American Games	Edinburgh, United Kingdom	6th	400 m	46.1
1970	Pan American Games	Edinburgh, United Kingdom	6th	4 × 100 m relay	40.3
1970	Pan American Games	Edinburgh, United Kingdom	2nd	4 × 400 m relay	3:05.49
1971	Pan American Games	Cali, Colombia	3rd	200 m	20.39
1971	Pan American Games	Cali, Colombia	–	4 × 100 m relay	DQ
1971	Pan American Games	Cali, Colombia	3rd	4 × 400 m relay	3:04.58
1972	Olympic Games	Munich, West Germany	22nd (qf)	200 m	20.99
1972	Olympic Games	Munich, West Germany	8th	4 × 400 m relay	3:03.58
