= Trevor Campbell (sprinter) =

Jamaican sprinter (born 1954)

Personal information
- Nationality: Jamaican
- Born: 24 July 1954 (age 72)

Sport
- Sport: Sprinting
- Event: 4 × 400 metres relay
Medal record
Men's Athletics
Representing Jamaica
Olympic Games
Silver medal – second place	1971 Cali	4x400 Relay

Trevor Campbell (born 24 July 1954) is a Jamaican sprinter. He competed in the men's 4 × 400 metres relay at the 1972 Summer Olympics. He won a silver medal in the 4 x 400 metres relay at the 1971 Pan American Games.

Campbell was an All-American sprinter for the USC Trojans track and field team, anchoring their 4 × 400 metres relay team to a 4th-place finish at the 1975 NCAA Division I Outdoor Track and Field Championships.
