= Len Walters (athlete) =

English sprinter

Personal information
- Nationality: British (English)
- Born: 27 January 1947 (age 79) London, England

Sport
- Sport: Athletics
- Event: 400m
- Club: Thames Valley Harriers
Medal record
Athletics
Representing England
Commonwealth Games
Bronze medal – third place	1970 Edinburgh	4x400m relay

Leonard Barry Walters (born 1947), is a male former athlete who competed for England.

== Biography ==
Walters finished third behind Martin Bilham in the400 metres event at the 1970 AAA Championships. Shortly afterwards he represented England and won a bronze medal in the 4 x 400 metres freestyle relay, at the 1970 British Commonwealth Games in Edinburgh, Scotland.

Walters was second behind David Jenkins at the 1971 AAA Championships and represented Great Britain in the 1971 European Athletics Championships in Helsinki.
