= Leslie Miller (athlete) =

Bahamian sprinter

Personal information
- Nationality: Bahamian
- Born: 24 March 1948 (age 78) Nassau, Bahamas

Sport
- Sport: Sprinting
- Event: 400 metres

Leslie O. Miller (born 24 March 1948) is a Bahamian athlete, businessman and politician. He won gold at the 1966 British Empire Games in the 440 yard dash and represented the Bahamas at the 1968 Summer Olympics. He became a businessman and later a member of parliament and cabinet minister. He has also served on numerous government boards.

== Early life and education ==
Miller was born in Nassau, the third son of contractor Leroy Miller and his wife Sybil (née Lockhart) Miller left Nassau for Miami in 1965 to attend first Attucks High School and then Palmetto Senior High School, where he starred in track and field.

== Athletics ==
Miller represented the Bahamas at the 1966 Empire Games where he won gold in the 440 yard dash, aged 18. In 1967, he represented his country at the Pan American Games in Canada. At the 1968 Summer Olympics in Mexico City, he competed in the men's 400 metres.

== Career ==
=== Business ===
Miller studied marketing at the University of Texas at El Paso.

A successful businessman, he served as chairman of New Providence Port Authority, chairman of the Bahamas Electricity Corporation, chairman of Town Planning, and chairman of the Water and Sewerage Corporation.

=== Politics ===
Miller won a seat as Member of Parliament for the Blue Hills constituency and later the Tall Pines constituency. He has served variously as Minister of Trade and Industry and Minister of Agriculture and Marine Resources.
