= Salvador Medina (athlete) =

Mexican sprinter (born 1943)

Personal information
- Nationality: Mexican
- Born: 20 May 1943 (age 83)

Sport
- Sport: Sprinting
- Event: 4 × 400 metres relay

Salvador Medina Moreno (born 20 May 1943) is a Mexican sprinter. He competed in the men's 4 × 400 metres relay at the 1968 Summer Olympics.
