= Sam Bugri =

Ghanaian public health official and sprinter (born 1943)

Personal information
- Nationality: Ghanaian
- Born: 2 April 1943 Bawku, Upper East, Ghana
- Died: 10 March 2024 (aged 80)

Sport
- Sport: Sprinting
- Event: 400 metres

Dr. Samuel Zanya Bugri MD MSc (2 April 1943 – 10 March 2024), also known as Sam Bugri, was a Ghanaian sprinter and public health official. As a sprinter, he competed in the 400 metres at the 1968 Summer Olympics and the 1972 Summer Olympics. As a healthcare professional, he had worked for many programs and organizations, including as the first Coordinator of Ghana's Guinea Worm Eradication Program. In this position he worked closely with international organizations such as the Carter Center, WHO, and UNICEF.
