= José L'Oficial =

Dominican Republic sprinter

Personal information
- Nationality: Dominican
- Born: 4 November 1947 (age 78)

Sport
- Sport: Sprinting
- Event: 400 metres

José L'Oficial (born 4 November 1947) is a Dominican Republic sprinter. He competed in the men's 400 metres at the 1968 Summer Olympics.
