= Bouncy Moore =

American track and field athlete

James E. "Bouncy" Moore (born June 4, 1951) is a retired American track and field athlete, known for the long jump (thus the nickname he acquired). He was a two time National Champion. He was the silver medalist at the 1971 Pan American Games.

While competing for the University of Oregon, his points as runner up in the 1970 Long Jump at the NCAA Championships helped Oregon gain enough points to tie for the National Championship with BYU and Kansas. He was the 1971 NCAA Champion. Also in 1971, he was on the American team in the inaugural USA vs Africa series. Prior to Oregon he competed for San Diego High School, finishing third in the 1968 CIF California State Meet. Arnie Robinson was a rival from nearby Morse High School. When Moore was runner up in the 1970 NCAA Championships, Robinson was the winner. Robinson was the gold medalist at the 1971 Pan Am Games. But Robinson was in fourth place when Moore won the NCAA. Moore was injured during the 1972 season. While he made it to the finals of the NCAA Championships, the injuries prevented him from being competitive, also losing his opportunity to make a serious effort toward the 1972 Olympics. Robinson won the bronze medal (and the 1976 gold). Moore's career best of 8.20 m (26 ft 10 3/4 in) came at the Modesto Relays in 1974.
