= Naftali Bon =

Kenyan sprinter

Olympic medal record

Men's Athletics
Silver medal – second place	1968 Mexico City	4x400 metre relay

Naftali Bon (9 October 1945 – 2 November 2018) was a Kenyan athlete who competed mainly in the 400 metres. He was born in Kapsabet, Rift Valley Province.

He competed for Kenya in the 1968 Summer Olympics held in Mexico City in the 4 x 400 metre relay where he won the silver medal with his teammates Daniel Rudisha, Munyoro Nyamau and Charles Asati. He shares the cover of the September 1969 issue of Track and Field News with Kip Keino. He died on 2 November 2018 at Kapsabet County Hospital.
