= Daniel Rudisha =

Kenyan sprinter (1945–2019)

Medal record

Men's athletics

Representing Kenya
Silver medal – second place	1968 Mexico City	4x400 metre relay

Daniel Matasi Rudisha (August 11, 1945 – March 6, 2019) was a Kenyan sprint athlete who competed mainly in the 400 metres.

Born in Kilgoris, Rift Valley Province, he competed for Kenya in the 1968 Summer Olympics held in Mexico City in the 4 x 400 metre relay where he won the silver medal with his teammates Munyoro Nyamau, Naftali Bon and Charles Asati. He also competed in the 400 metres at those Olympics, finishing a non-qualifying 6th in his heat.

After retiring from the sport, he became a school teacher and a coach.

As a coach, he trained many top class Kenyan athletes, including Billy Konchellah, who won the 800 metres at the World Athletics Championships in 1987.

His son, David Rudisha, is also an athlete and Olympic Champion at 800 metres, having set a new world record in the final at London 2012 and defending his title in the 2016 Rio Games.

Daniel Rudisha died on March 6, 2019, in the War Memorial Hospital in Nakuru after suffering a heart attack while undergoing dialysis treatment for his diabetes.
