= Tom Ulan =

American sprinter

Personal information
- Born: 1 December 1949 (age 76) Westhampton, New York, United States

Sport
- Sport: Track and field
Medal record
Representing United States
Summer Universiade
Gold medal – first place	1970 Turin	400m

Tom Ulan (born December 1, 1949) is an American retired sprinter and three-time All-American. Ulan was the first track and field athlete from Rutgers University to reach international notoriety.
