= Trevor James (sprinter) =

Trinidad and Tobago sprinter

Personal information
- Born: 19 March 1949 (age 77) Fyzabad, Siparia, Trinidad and Tobago

Sport
- Sport: Sprinting
- Event: 200 metres

Trevor Fitzroy James (born 19 March 1949) is a Trinidad and Tobago sprinter. He competed in the men's 200 metres at the 1972 Summer Olympics.

James competed for the Tennessee Volunteers track and field team in the NCAA.
