= Anthony Egwunyenga =

Nigerian sprinter

Personal information
- Nationality: Nigerian
- Born: 22 July 1943 (age 82)

Sport
- Sport: Sprinting
- Event: 400 metres

Anthony Egwunyenga (born 22 July 1943) is a Nigerian sprinter. He competed in the men's 400 metres at the 1968 Summer Olympics.
