= Musa Dogon Yaro =

Nigerian athlete (1945– 2008)

Personal information
- Nationality: Nigerian
- Born: 27 February 1945 Kagoro, British Nigeria
- Died: August 2008 (aged 63)

Sport
- Sport: Sprinting
- Event: 400 metres

Musa Dogon Yaro (27 February 1945 – August 2008) was a Nigerian sprinter. Musa competed in the men's 400 metres at the 1968 Summer Olympics.

== Personal life ==
Dogonyaro attended Biola University, where he was a football and track athlete. He later earned a doctorate degree in physical education. He worked at the Kaduna State Sports Council and was later director of Sports development at the Federal Ministry of Sports.

He was a father of four children.
