= Roberta Brown (javelin thrower) =

American javelin thrower (1947–1981)

Personal information
- Nationality: American
- Born: April 12, 1947 Seattle, Washington, U.S.
- Died: August 4, 1981 (aged 34) Dillingham, Alaska, U.S.

Sport
- Sport: Athletics
- Event: Javelin throw

Roberta Brown (April 12, 1947 – August 4, 1981) was an American athlete. She competed in the women's javelin throw at the 1972 Summer Olympics. A commercial pilot, she was killed in a plane crash in 1981.
