= Mamman Makama =

Nigerian sprinter

Personal information
- Nationality: Nigerian
- Born: 23 November 1946 (age 79) Abuja, Nigeria

Sport
- Sport: Sprinting
- Event: 400 metres

Mamman Makama (born 23 November 1946) is a Nigerian sprinter. He competed in the men's 400 metres at the 1968 Summer Olympics.
