= Ian Gordon (athlete) =

Canadian sprinter (born 1950)

Personal information
- Nationality: Canadian
- Born: 2 April 1950 (age 75) Vancouver, British Columbia, Canada

Sport
- Sport: Sprinting
- Event: 4 × 400 metres relay

Ian Sydney Gordon (born 2 April 1950) is a Canadian sprinter. He competed in the men's 4 × 400 metres relay at the 1972 Summer Olympics.
