= Leighton Priestley =

Jamaican sprinter

Personal information
- Nationality: Jamaican
- Born: 18 January 1951 (age 74)

Sport
- Sport: Sprinting
- Event: 400 metres

Leighton Priestley (born 18 January 1951) is a Jamaican sprinter. He competed in the 400 metres at the 1972 Summer Olympics and the 1976 Summer Olympics.
