= Tommy Turner (sprinter) =

American sprinter

Personal information
- Born: January 17, 1947 (age 79) St. Louis, Missouri, United States
Medal record
Representing the United States
Men's athletics
Pan American Games
Gold medal – first place	1971 Cali	4x400 m relay
Summer Universiade
Gold medal – first place	1970 Turin	4x400m relay

Tommy Edward Turner (born January 17, 1947) is an American former sprinter. Running for Murray State, he won the 1971 NCAA Indoor Championships in the 600 yard run.
