= Lee Evans (sprinter) =

American track and field athlete (1947–2021)

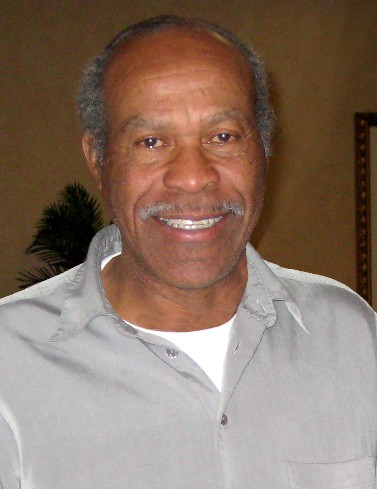

Personal information
- Full name: Lee Edward Evans
- Born: February 25, 1947 Madera, California, U.S.
- Died: May 19, 2021 (aged 74) Lagos, Nigeria
- Education: San Jose State College
- Height: 5 ft 11 in (1.80 m)
- Weight: 172 lb (78 kg)

Sport
- Sport: Athletics
- Events: 100–800 m sprint, hurdles
- Club: Santa Clara Valley Youth Village

Achievements and titles
- Personal bests: 100 m – 10.9 (1966); 200 m – 20.4 (1969); 400 m – 43.86 (1968); 880 yd – 1:52.0 (1966); 440 ydH – 50.5 (1970)
Medal record
Men's athletics
Representing United States
Olympic Games
Gold medal – first place	1968 Mexico City	400 m
Gold medal – first place	1968 Mexico City	4 × 400 m relay
Pan American Games
Gold medal – first place	1967 Winnipeg	400 m
Gold medal – first place	1967 Winnipeg	4 × 400 m relay

Lee Edward Evans (February 25, 1947 – May 19, 2021) was an American sprinter. He won two gold medals in the 1968 Summer Olympics, setting world records in the 400 meters and the 4 × 400 meters relay, both of which stood for 20 and 24 years respectively. Evans co-founded the Olympic Project for Human Rights and was part of the athlete's boycott and the Black Power movement.

== Early life and education ==
Lee Edward Evans was born on February 25, 1947, in Madera, California, to Dayton and Pearlie Mae Evans. At the age of four, his family moved to Fresno. He attended Madison Elementary School and in his last year there, he trained for his first race by racing his friends at school. Evans went on to Central Union High School where he was classified in the C class for the 660 yard dash due to his height, weight, and age. Due to his mother contracting Valley fever, the Evans family moved to San Jose, California, during Lee's sophomore year. While running for Overfelt High School, Evans was undefeated, improving his 440-yard time from 48.2 in 1964 to 46.9 in 1965.

Evans was a Fulbright scholar in sociology and attended San Jose State, where he was coached by Hall of Famer Bud Winter. In 1966 as a freshman, he won his first AAU championship in 440 yd (402.34 m). He won the AAU title four years in a row (1966–1969) and again in 1972 and he added the NCAA 400 m title in 1968. His only defeat during that streak came at the hands of San Jose State teammate Tommie Smith. The two were so competitive, Winter could not let them practice together.

Evans achieved his first world record in 1966, as a member of the USA national team which broke the 4 × 400 m relay record at Los Angeles, the first team to better 3 minutes (2:59.6) in the event. The next year he helped break the 4 × 220 yd (201.17 m) relay world record at Fresno in a time of 1:22.1. In 1967, Evans won the 400 metres at the Pan American Games, in an automatic time of 44.95, which (in the era of hand times) was the first bona fide automatic time to break 45 seconds.

== Olympics ==
Evans was an influential leader in regards to the Black Power movement. The Olympic Project for Human Rights began with black students protesting in order to have equal housing opportunities and was made into the black power movement after a Tommie Smith interview. Tommie Smith and John Carlos were the faces of the movement, but Smith and Evans were the driving forces behind the movement. Carlos was said to have not even come to any of the meetings of the group, but when it came time to be in the spotlight he took his chance and claimed his spot in the history books.

The black athletes of the 1968 Mexico City Olympics chose not to protest the Olympics as a whole, instead they chose to protest by wearing an article of black clothing during every event in which they participated. Evans wanted the world to understand the way he felt about the Mexico City Olympic Games but did not want to take away from the winners and the sports themselves. In regards to the South African Olympic Ban, Vince Matthews asked Evans what would happen after the verdict because of his position as OPHR organizer. Evans replied that it was unclear as to what the International Olympic Committee would decide, but whatever the decision was the United States Olympic Team would stick together. Evans received death threats prior to and during the Olympics and claimed that had he not had these threats on his mind he probably could have run faster than he did, even though he broke a world record.

Evans won the 1968 Olympic trials at Echo Summit, California, with a world record 44.06 and demolished it in the Olympic final, winning in 43.86 seconds aged 21 years and 8 months, from which he still stands as the 19th best performer in history. Evans won a second gold as the anchorman on the 4 × 400 m relay team, setting another world record of 2:56.16. Both times stood as a world record for almost twenty years (the relay, for almost 24 years). While accepting the relay Gold medal Evans and fellow African-American medalists Larry James and Ron Freeman received their medals wearing black berets in imitation of the Black Panther Party. After winning the AAU 400 m titles in 1969 and 1972, Evans finished only fourth in the 1972 Olympic trials, but was named a member of the 4 × 400 m relay team once more. However, when the time came the United States could not field a team because Vincent Matthews and Wayne Collett were suspended by the IOC for a demonstration at a medal ceremony similar to the one staged by Tommie Smith and John Carlos at the previous Olympics.

== Post-Olympics ==
Evans became a professional after the 1972 season joining the International Track Association (ITA) tour. He had some success on the ITA tour notably setting a 600 m indoors world best at the first meet in Idaho State University's Minidome. The ITA folded in 1976 and Evans was reinstated as an amateur in 1980 and ran a 46.5 in one of his few appearances that year, at the age of thirty-three.

Evans went on to head the national athletics programs in six different African nations before accepting a position as head cross country/track & field coach at the University of South Alabama. Evans' college and amateur careers as well as his involvement in the Civil Rights Movement are chronicled in Frank Murphy's The Last Protest: Lee Evans in Mexico City. Evans was inducted into the United States National Track and Field Hall of Fame in 1983.

1983 and 1998 Evans competed in Masters Track and Field Competitions.

In 2011, Evans was diagnosed with "a large tumor in the pituitary gland area of his brain" and underwent surgery. He was banned from coaching for four years in 2014 when a 16-year-old Nigerian girl he was coaching tested positive for a banned steroid after he advised her to take supplements.

In May 2021, Evans had a stroke and was hospitalized in Lagos, Nigeria. He died on May 19, 2021, at the age of 74.

== Activist On Black Athletes ==
While being a student athlete at San Jose State University, Lee Edward Evans ended up dealing with a ton of types of discrimination but instead of fueling the fire he was able to create different organizations to find ways to stop racism and discrimination. In the book “A People’s History of Sports in the United States, Dave Zirin” highlights that Evans is a head leading advocate for athletics bases for the Olympic Project for Human Rights also known as the OPHR. Alongside collaborating with the organizer Harry Edwards and Tommie Smith, to start a boycott for athletes in the 1968 Olympic Games. Zirin states that Evans' statement was that black students were denied to be able to rent a home from their many local landlords around the university, which brings up a bigger issue regarding housing for multiple black individuals in different universities. In the academic article “It’s Not Really My County: Lew Alcindor and the Revolt of the Black Athlete” discusses about John Matthew Smith which explains on how Evan was a leader, using a letter referring back to October 16, 1967 stating that Tommie Smith, Harry Edwards and Lee Edward Evens found proof which was preserved NCAA documents connecting that Evens was the person to set up OPHR. Evens involvement in different organizations boosted and expanded the limits of athlete protest in 1968. In the book Zirin they describe Evans as a fair minded athlete as well as grouping other individual athletes who ended up using unfair treatment based on exploitation of a person's race, or just being blatantly racist towards another athlete in the game. Zirin’s book also acknowledged that Evan inspired others to better their understanding of sports and how it can impact the world. In the academic source Smith talks about how Evans is very important for black athletes, and advocating for different treatment for athletes this was not just for universities but around the world. The academic source also discusses how Evans ended up helping the Olympic Project for Human Rights by discovering his authentic signature which shows Evans involvement in demonstrating and leading the protest instead of just participating. Smith also describes that other athletes including Evans in 1967-1968 planned to protest together instead of being alone showing others that they all came together to fight to stop the unfair actions that went on in sports.
