= Munyoro Nyamau =

Kenyan sprinter (died 2025)

Personal information
- Died: 7 October 2025 Nakuru, Kenya
Medal record
Men's athletics
Representing Kenya
Olympic Games
Gold medal – first place	1972 Munich	4 × 400 m relay
Silver medal – second place	1968 Mexico City	4 × 400 m relay

Munyoro Nyamau (Hezekiah Munyoro Nyamau; 5 December 1942 or 6 December 1938 – 7 October 2025) was a Kenyan athlete and winner of the gold medal in the 4 × 400 m relay at the 1972 Summer Olympics.

== Biography ==
Nyamau was born on either 6 December 1938, or 5 December 1942.

He won inter-school championships in Kisii when he was 15.

Nyamau reached the semifinals of the 400 m and won a surprise silver medal as a member of the Kenyan 4 × 400 m relay team at the 1968 Summer Olympics. His teammates were Daniel Rudisha, Naftali Bon and Charles Asati.

He won the gold medal in the 4 × 400 m relay at the 1970 British Commonwealth Games. In September 1970, Nyamau - with teammates Naftali Bon, Thomas Saisi and Robert Ouko - set the men's 4 × 880 yard world record at 7:11.6.

At the Munich Olympic Games, Nyamau was eliminated in the quarterfinals of the 400 m, but he won the gold medal in the absence of the United States as a member of the Kenyan 4 × 400 m relay team. Other members of the team were Charles Asati, Robert Ouko and Julius Sang.

Nyamau joined the Kenya Army in 1963 and was employed by them until his retirement in 1997.

Nyamau died of gallbladder cancer at a hospital in Nakuru, on 7 October 2025.
