= Robert Ouko (athlete) =

Kenyan athlete (1948–2019)

Olympic medal record

Men's Athletics
| Gold medal – first place | 1972 Munich | 4 × 400 m relay |

Robert Ouko (24 October 1948 – 18 August 2019) was a Kenyan athlete, winner of gold medal in 4 × 400 m relay at the 1972 Summer Olympics.

== Career ==
Ouko won two golds at the 1970 British Commonwealth Games, first in 800 m and then as a member of the Kenyan 4 × 400 m relay team. At the same year he was also a member of a Kenyan 4 × 880 yd relay team, which set the new world record of 7:11.6.

Ouko competed for the North Carolina Central Eagles track and field team in the NCAA. In 2017, he was inducted into the Penn Relays hall of fame.

At the Munich Olympics, Ouko was fifth in 800 m and ran the third leg in the gold medal-winning Kenyan 4 × 400 m relay team.

After his athletics career, Ouko worked as the secretary general in the Kenyan Amateur Athletic Association.

Ouko died 18 August 2019.

== See also ==
- Luo people of Kenya and Tanzania
