= Martin Bilham =

English sprinter (born 1946)

Personal information
- Nationality: British (English)
- Born: 3 December 1946 (age 79) Woolwich, England

Sport
- Sport: Athletics
- Event: 400m
- Club: Border AC
Medal record
Athletics
Representing England
Commonwealth Games
Bronze medal – third place	1970 Edinburgh	4 x 400m relay

Martin Bilham (born 1946), is a male former athlete who competed for England.

== Biography ==
Bilham became the British 400 metres champion after winning the British AAA Championships title at the 1970 AAA Championships. Shortly afterwards he represented England and won a bronze medal in the 4 x 400 metres relay, at the 1970 British Commonwealth Games in Edinburgh, Scotland.

In 1970 he set his personal best time of 46.65 as English champion and competed in the 1971 European Athletics Championships.
