= Athletics at the 1968 Summer Olympics =

Athletics at the Games of the XIX Olympiad
- Venue: Estadio Olímpico Universitario
- Dates: 13 to 20 October
- No. of events: 36
- Competitors: 1031 from 93 nations

At the 1968 Summer Olympics in Mexico City, 36 athletics events were contested, 24 for men and 12 for women. There were a total number of 1031 participating athletes from 93 countries.

These games were notable for a number of Olympic firsts and numerous world records. These included:

- Dick Fosbury introduced the Fosbury Flop to the high Jump by jumping over backwards, whereas the prevailing methods involved jumping forwards or sideways.
- The first African Gold Medallists in the 1500 m and 3000 m Steeplechase, as well as many other medals in middle and long distance events. Particularly symbolic of Africa's newfound dominance was the victory by Kenyan athlete Kip Keino in the 1500 m final.
- Bob Beamon broke Ralph Boston's 1965 and Igor Ter-Ovanesyan's 1967 World Record in the Men's Long Jump by 55 cm (22 in). This record was not broken until 1991. It remains the second-best legal jump in history.
- The World Record was broken in the Men's Triple Jump five times by three athletes, including the final jump of the event. The top five finishers all beat the previous world record.
- The Black Power salute: Tommie Smith and John Carlos wore black gloves and bowed their heads on the medal podium after their medals in the 200 m.
- East German and West German athletes competed on separate teams. In the 1956, 1960 and 1964 Summer Games they competed as a unified German team.
- Jim Hines became the first sprinter to officially break the 10-second barrier in the 100 metres.

This was the first Olympics to use an all-weather track surface now used in every major international athletics competition.

== Medal summary ==
=== Men ===
Games	Gold		Silver		Bronze	
100 metres	Jim Hines; United States	9.95 WR	Lennox Miller; Jamaica	10.04	Charles Greene; United States	10.07
200 metres	Tommie Smith; United States	19.83 WR	Peter Norman; Australia	20.06 NR	John Carlos; United States	20.10
400 metres	Lee Evans; United States	43.86 WR	Larry James; United States	43.97	Ron Freeman; United States	44.41
800 metres	Ralph Doubell; Australia	1:44.40 WR	Wilson Kiprugut; Kenya	1:44.57	Tom Farrell; United States	1:45.46
1500 metres	Kipchoge Keino; Kenya	3:34.91 OR	Jim Ryun; United States	3:37.89	Bodo Tümmler; West Germany	3:39.08
5000 metres	Mohammed Gammoudi; Tunisia	14:05.01	Kipchoge Keino; Kenya	14:05.16	Naftali Temu; Kenya	14:06.41
10,000 metres	Naftali Temu; Kenya	29:27.40	Mamo Wolde; Ethiopia	29:27.75	Mohammed Gammoudi; Tunisia	29:34.2
110 metres hurdles	Willie Davenport; United States	13.33 OR	Ervin Hall; United States	13.42	Eddy Ottoz; Italy	13.46
400 metres hurdles	David Hemery; Great Britain	48.12 WR	Gerhard Hennige; West Germany	49.02	John Sherwood; Great Britain	49.03
3000 metres steeplechase	Amos Biwott; Kenya	8:51.02	Benjamin Kogo; Kenya	8:51.56	George Young; United States	8:51.86
4 × 100 metres relay	United States; Charles Greene; Mel Pender; Ronnie Ray Smith; Jim Hines	38.24 WR	Cuba; Hermes Ramírez; Juan Morales; Pablo Montes; Enrique Figuerola	38.40	France; Gérard Fenouil; Jocelyn Delecour; Claude Piquemal; Roger Bambuck	38.43
4 × 400 metres relay	United States; Vincent Matthews; Ron Freeman; Larry James; Lee Evans	2:56.16 WR	Kenya; Daniel Rudisha; Munyoro Nyamau; Naftali Bon; Charles Asati	2:59.64	West Germany; Helmar Müller; Manfred Kinder; Gerhard Hennige; Martin Jellinghaus	3:00.57
Marathon	Mamo Wolde; Ethiopia	2:20:27	Kenji Kimihara; Japan	2:23:31	Mike Ryan; New Zealand	2:23:45
20 kilometres walk	Volodymyr Holubnychy; Soviet Union	1:33:58	José Pedraza; Mexico	1:34:00	Nikolay Smaga; Soviet Union	1:34:03
50 kilometres walk	Christoph Höhne; East Germany	4:20:14	Antal Kiss; Hungary	4:30:17	Larry Young; United States	4:31:55
High jump	Dick Fosbury; United States	2.24 m OR	Ed Caruthers; United States	2.22 m	Valentin Gavrilov; Soviet Union	2.20 m
Pole vault	Bob Seagren; United States	5.40 m OR	Claus Schiprowski; West Germany	5.40 m	Wolfgang Nordwig; East Germany	5.40 m
Long jump	Bob Beamon; United States	8.90 m WR	Klaus Beer; East Germany	8.19 m	Ralph Boston; United States	8.16 m
Triple jump	Viktor Saneyev; Soviet Union	17.39 m WR	Nelson Prudêncio; Brazil	17.27 m	Giuseppe Gentile; Italy	17.22 m
Shot put	Randy Matson; United States	20.54 m OR	George Woods; United States	20.12 m	Eduard Gushchin; Soviet Union	20.09 m
Discus throw	Al Oerter; United States	64.78 m OR	Lothar Milde; East Germany	63.08 m	Ludvík Daněk; Czechoslovakia	62.92 m
Hammer throw	Gyula Zsivótzky; Hungary	73.36 m OR	Romuald Klim; Soviet Union	73.28 m	Lázár Lovász; Hungary	69.78 m
Javelin throw	Jānis Lūsis; Soviet Union	90.10 m OR	Jorma Kinnunen; Finland	88.58 m	Gergely Kulcsár; Hungary	87.06 m
Decathlon	Bill Toomey; United States	8193 OR	Hans-Joachim Walde; West Germany	8111	Kurt Bendlin; West Germany	8064

=== Women ===
Games	Gold		Silver		Bronze	
100 metres	Wyomia Tyus; United States	11.08 WR	Barbara Ferrell; United States	11.15	Irena Szewińska; Poland	11.19
200 metres	Irena Szewińska; Poland	22.58 WR	Raelene Boyle; Australia	22.74	Jenny Lamy; Australia	22.88
400 metres	Colette Besson; France	52.03	Lillian Board; Great Britain	52.12	Natalya Pechonkina; Soviet Union	52.25
800 metres	Madeline Manning; United States	2:00.92 OR	Ileana Silai; Romania	2:02.58	Mia Gommers; Netherlands	2:02.63
80 metres hurdles	Maureen Caird; Australia	10.39 OR	Pam Kilborn; Australia	10.46	Chi Cheng; Taiwan	10.51
4 × 100 metres relay	United States; Margaret Bailes; Barbara Ferrell; Mildrette Netter; Wyomia Tyus	42.88 WR	Cuba; Violetta Quesada; Miguelina Cobián; Marlene Elejarde; Fulgencia Romay	43.36	Soviet Union; Galina Bukharina; Lyudmila Samotyosova; Vera Popkova; Lyudmila Zharkova	43.41
High jump	Miloslava Rezková; Czechoslovakia	1.82 m	Antonina Okorokova; Soviet Union	1.80 m	Valentina Kozyr; Soviet Union	1.80 m
Long jump	Viorica Viscopoleanu; Romania	6.82 m WR	Sheila Sherwood; Great Britain	6.68 m	Tatyana Talysheva; Soviet Union	6.66 m
Shot put	Margitta Gummel; East Germany	19.61 m WR	Marita Lange; East Germany	18.78 m	Nadezhda Chizhova; Soviet Union	18.19 m
Discus throw	Lia Manoliu; Romania	58.28 m OR	Liesel Westermann; West Germany	57.76 m	Jolán Kleiber-Kontsek; Hungary	54.90 m
Javelin throw	Angéla Németh; Hungary	60.36 m	Mihaela Peneș; Romania	59.92 m	Eva Janko; Austria	58.04 m
Pentathlon	Ingrid Becker; West Germany	5098	Liese Prokop; Austria	4966	Annamária Tóth; Hungary	4959

== Medal table ==
Rank	Nation	Gold	Silver	Bronze	Total
1	United States	15	6	7	28
2	Kenya	3	4	1	8
3	Soviet Union	3	2	8	13
4	Australia	2	3	1	6
4	East Germany	2	3	1	6
6	Romania	2	2	0	4
7	Hungary	2	1	4	7
8	West Germany	1	4	3	8
9	Great Britain	1	2	1	4
10	Ethiopia	1	1	0	2
11	Czechoslovakia	1	0	1	2
11	France	1	0	1	2
11	Poland	1	0	1	2
11	Tunisia	1	0	1	2
15	Cuba	0	2	0	2
16	Austria	0	1	1	2
17	Brazil	0	1	0	1
17	Finland	0	1	0	1
17	Jamaica	0	1	0	1
17	Japan	0	1	0	1
17	Mexico	0	1	0	1
22	Italy	0	0	2	2
23	Netherlands	0	0	1	1
23	New Zealand	0	0	1	1
23	Taiwan	0	0	1	1
Totals (25 entries)		36	36	36	108
