= Charles Asati =

Kenyan sprinter (born 1946)

Medal record

Men's Athletics

Representing Kenya

Olympic Games
Gold medal – first place	1972 Munich	4 × 400 m Relay
Silver medal – second place	1968 Mexico City	4 × 400 m Relay

All-Africa Games
Gold medal – first place	1973 Lagos	400 m

Charles Asati (born 3 March 1946) is a Kenyan former athlete, winner of a gold medal in 4 × 400 m relay at the 1972 Summer Olympics.

== Biography ==
At the 1968 Summer Olympics, Charles Asati reached to the quarterfinal of 200 m and was a member of Kenyan 4 × 400 m relay team, which won the surprise silver medal, with a time of 2:59.6.

At the 1970 British Commonwealth Games, Asati won a gold medal in 400 m and 4 × 400 m relay and was third in 200 m. He also won the 400 m and 4 × 400 m relay gold medals in 1973 All-African Games.

At the Munich Olympics, Asati was fourth in 400 m and won the gold medal as a member of the Kenyan 4 × 400 m relay team.

Asati won 400 metres gold medal at the 1973 All-Africa Games

Asati ended his running career in the 1974 British Commonwealth Games, where he won again both golds in 400 m and 4 × 400 m relay
