= Athletics at the 1968 Summer Olympics – Men's 400 metres hurdles =

Men's 400 metres hurdles at the Games of the XIX Olympiad
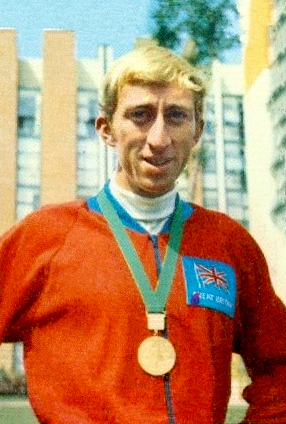
- David Hemery
- Venue: Estadio Olímpico Universitario
- Dates: October 13–15, 1968
- Competitors: 30 from 24 nations
- Winning time: 48.1 WR

Medalists
1st place, gold medalist(s)		David Hemery; Great Britain
2nd place, silver medalist(s)		Gerhard Hennige; West Germany
3rd place, bronze medalist(s)		John Sherwood; Great Britain

Official Video Highlights @1:05:39 Video on YouTube

The men's 400 metres hurdles competition at the 1968 Summer Olympics in Mexico City, Mexico took place on October 13–15 at the Estadio Olímpico Universitario. There were 30 competitors from 24 nations. The maximum number of athletes per nation had been set at 3 since the 1930 Olympic Congress. The event was won by David Hemery of Great Britain, the nation's first victory in the men's 400 metres hurdles since 1928 and second overall—second-most after the United States' 11. The win broke a streak of 6 consecutive American victories. Further, the United States failed to medal in the event for the first time ever; in all 13 previous times the event was held, the American team had at least a silver medalist. Great Britain was the first nation other than the United States to have two medalists in the event in the same Games, as John Sherwood took bronze. Gerhard Hennige of West Germany was the first German hurdler to earn a medal in the event, finishing between the two Britons with silver.

== Background ==
This was the 14th time the event was held. It had been introduced along with the men's 200 metres hurdles in 1900, with the 200 being dropped after 1904 and the 400 being held through 1908 before being left off the 1912 programme. However, when the Olympics returned in 1920 after World War I, the men's 400 metres hurdles was back and would continue to be contested at every Games thereafter.

Four of the eight finalists from the 1964 Games returned: silver medalist John Cooper of Great Britain, fourth-place finisher Gary Knoke of Australia, sixth-place finisher Roberto Frinolli of Italy, and eighth-place finisher Wilfried Geeroms of Belgium. Once again, the American team (which had won the last six gold medals in the event) was favored. Geoff Vanderstock had broken the world record at the U.S. trials; Ron Whitney had won the AAU title in 1967 and 1968.

Cuba, Ghana, and Libya each made their debut in the event; West Germany competed separately for the first time. The United States made its 14th appearance, the only nation to have competed at every edition of the event to that point.

== Summary ==
In the final, David Hemery took the race out hard. By the final straightaway he had an ever-growing lead over the world record holder Geoff Vanderstock. Hemery continued to pour it on, taking seven tenths of a second out of the world record, a huge improvement. Vanderstock struggled between the final barrier and the finish line, his 2-metre advantage over field evaporated. Gerhard Hennige, then John Sherwood edged past him at the line.

== Competition format ==
The competition used the three-round format used every Games since 1908 (except the four-round competition in 1952): quarterfinals, semifinals, and a final. Ten sets of hurdles were set on the course. The hurdles were 3 feet (91.5 centimetres) tall and were placed 35 metres apart beginning 45 metres from the starting line, resulting in a 40 metres home stretch after the last hurdle. The 400 metres track was standard.

There were 4 quarterfinal heats with 8 athletes each (before two withdrawals left one heat with only 6 men). The top 4 men in each quarterfinal advanced to the semifinals. The 16 semifinalists were divided into 2 semifinals of 8 athletes each, with the top 4 in each semifinal advancing to the 8-man final.

== Records ==
Prior to the competition, the existing world and Olympic records were as follows.

World record	Geoff Vanderstock (USA)	48.8	Echo Summit, United States	11 September 1968
Olympic record	Glenn Davis (USA)	49.3	Rome, Italy	2 September 1960

Ron Whitney set a new Olympic record of 49.0 seconds in the third quarterfinal. Three men (Gerhard Hennige, John Sherwood, and Geoff Vanderstock matched that time in the final, but they were all nearly a full second behind the winner: Dave Hemery, who shattered the world record with a 48.1 seconds performance.

== Schedule ==
All times are Central Standard Time (UTC-6)

Date	Time	Round
Sunday, 13 October 1968	15:00	Heats
Monday, 14 October 1968	15:00	Semifinals
Tuesday, 15 October 1968	17:35	Final

== Results ==
=== Heats ===
==== Heats 1 ====
Rank	Athlete	Nation	Time (hand)	Time (automatic)	Notes
1	Gerhard Hennige	West Germany	49.5	49.57	Q
2	Geoff Vanderstock	United States	50.6	50.62	Q
3	Vyacheslav Skomorokhov	Soviet Union	50.7	50.72	Q
4	Víctor Maldonado	Venezuela	51.4	51.46	Q
5	Kiyoo Yui	Japan	51.5	51.56	
6	Robert McLaren	Canada	51.8	51.84	
7	Miguel Olivera	Cuba	51.9	51.98	
8	Mohamed Asswai Khalifa	Libya	54.3	54.34	

==== Heats 2 ====
Rank	Athlete	Nation	Time (hand)	Time (automatic)	Notes
1	Juan Carlos Dyrzka	Argentina	49.8	49.82	Q
2	Roger Johnson	New Zealand	51.3	51.39	Q
3	John Cooper	Great Britain	51.4	51.43	Q
4	Mamadou Sarr	Senegal	51.5	51.58	Q
5	Wes Brooker	Canada	51.5	51.68	
6	William Quaye	Ghana	51.6	55.54	
	Joachim Singer	East Germany	DNS	–	
	Boyd Gittins	United States	DNS	–	

==== Heats 3 ====
Rank	Athlete	Nation	Time (hand)	Time (automatic)	Notes
1	Ron Whitney	United States	49.0	49.06	Q, OR
2	Rainer Schubert	West Germany	49.1	49.15	Q
3	Gary Knoke	Australia	49.8	49.88	Q
4	John Sherwood	Great Britain	50.2	50.31	Q
5	Wilhelm Weistand	Poland	50.7	50.71	
6	Wilfried Geeroms	Belgium	51.2	51.27	
7	Juan Santiago Gordón	Chile	52.4	52.43	
8	Zambrose Abdul Rahman	Malaysia	53.2	53.23	

==== Heats 4 ====
Rank	Athlete	Nation	Time (hand)	Time (automatic)	Notes
1	Roberto Frinolli	Italy	49.9	49.95	Q
2	David Hemery	Great Britain	50.3	50.33	Q
3	Robert Poirier	France	50.5	50.51	Q
4	Jaakko Tuominen	Finland	50.6	50.63	Q
5	Kimaru Songok	Kenya	50.6	50.66	
6	Alejandro Sánchez	Mexico	51.6	51.62	
7	Juan García	Cuba	51.8	51.87	
8	Georgios Birmbilis	Greece	52.6	52.62	

=== Semifinals ===
==== Semifinal 1 ====
Rank	Athlete	Nation	Time (hand)	Time (automatic)	Notes
1	Roberto Frinolli	Italy	49.2	49.14	Q
2	Geoff Vanderstock	United States	49.2	49.22	Q
3	John Sherwood	Great Britain	49.3	49.37	Q
4	Rainer Schubert	West Germany	49.3	49.38	Q
5	Juan Carlos Dyrzka	Argentina	49.8	49.86	
6	Jaakko Tuominen	Finland	50.8	50.82	
7	John Cooper	Great Britain	50.8	50.82	
8	Víctor Maldonado	Venezuela	52.2	52.29	

==== Semifinal 2 ====
Rank	Athlete	Nation	Time (hand)	Time (automatic)	Notes
1	Gerhard Hennige	West Germany	49.1	49.16	Q
2	Ron Whitney	United States	49.2	49.29	Q
3	David Hemery	Great Britain	49.3	49.37	Q
4	Vyacheslav Skomorokhov	Soviet Union	49.6	49.61	Q
5	Gary Knoke	Australia	49.6	49.61	
6	Robert Poirier	France	51.2	51.23	
7	Roger Johnson	New Zealand	51.8	51.87	
8	Mamadou Sarr	Senegal	52.1	52.20	

=== Final ===
Rank	Athlete	Nation	Time (hand)	Time (automatic)	Notes
1st place, gold medalist(s)	David Hemery	Great Britain	48.1	48.12	WR
2nd place, silver medalist(s)	Gerhard Hennige	West Germany	49.0	49.02	
3rd place, bronze medalist(s)	John Sherwood	Great Britain	49.0	49.03	
4	Geoff Vanderstock	United States	49.0	49.07	
5	Vyacheslav Skomorokhov	Soviet Union	49.1	49.12	
6	Ron Whitney	United States	49.2	49.27	
7	Rainer Schubert	West Germany	49.2	49.30	
8	Roberto Frinolli	Italy	50.1	50.13	

== Results summary ==
Rank	Athlete	Nation	Heats	Semifinals	Final	Notes
1st place, gold medalist(s)	David Hemery	Great Britain	50.3	49.3	48.1	WR
2nd place, silver medalist(s)	Gerhard Hennige	West Germany	49.5	49.1	49.0	
3rd place, bronze medalist(s)	John Sherwood	Great Britain	50.2	49.3	49.0	
4	Geoff Vanderstock	United States	50.6	49.2	49.0	
5	Vyacheslav Skomorokhov	Soviet Union	50.7	49.6	49.1	
6	Ron Whitney	United States	49.0	49.2	49.2	
7	Rainer Schubert	West Germany	49.1	49.3	49.2	
8	Roberto Frinolli	Italy	49.9	49.2	50.1	
9	Gary Knoke	Australia	49.8	49.6	Did not advance	
10	Juan Carlos Dyrzka	Argentina	49.8	49.8	Did not advance	
11	Jaakko Tuominen	Finland	50.6	50.8	Did not advance	
12	John Cooper	Great Britain	51.4	50.8	Did not advance	
13	Robert Poirier	France	50.5	51.2	Did not advance	
14	Roger Johnson	New Zealand	51.3	51.8	Did not advance	
15	Mamadou Sarr	Senegal	51.5	52.1	Did not advance	
16	Víctor Maldonado	Venezuela	51.4	52.2	Did not advance	
17	Kimaru Songok	Kenya	50.6	Did not advance		
18	Wilhelm Weistand	Poland	50.7	Did not advance		
19	Wilfried Geeroms	Belgium	51.2	Did not advance		
20	Wes Brooker	Canada	51.5	Did not advance		
20	Kiyoo Yui	Japan	51.5	Did not advance		
22	William Quaye	Ghana	51.6	Did not advance		
22	Alejandro Sánchez	Mexico	51.6	Did not advance		
24	Juan García	Cuba	51.8	Did not advance		
24	Robert McLaren	Canada	51.8	Did not advance		
26	Miguel Olivera	Cuba	51.9	Did not advance		
27	Juan Santiago Gordón	Chile	52.4	Did not advance		
28	Georgios Birmbilis	Greece	52.6	Did not advance		
29	Zambrose Abdul Rahman	Malaysia	53.2	Did not advance		
30	Mohamed Asswai Khalifa	Libya	54.3	Did not advance		
