= Athletics at the 1965 Summer Universiade – Men's 400 metres hurdles =

The men's 400 metres hurdles event at the 1965 Summer Universiade was held at the People's Stadium in Budapest on 26, 27 and 28 August 1965.

== Medalists ==
Gold	Silver	Bronze
Roberto Frinolli; Italy	Robert Poirier; France	Ron Whitney; United States

== Results ==
=== Heats ===
Rank	Heat	Athlete	Nationality	Time	Notes
1	1	Ron Whitney	United States	52.1	Q
2	1	Kiyoo Yui	Japan	53.7	Q
3	1	Miklós Vértessy	Hungary	54.1	Q
4	1	Dimcho Kovachev	Bulgaria	54.9	Q
5	1	Hans Wick	Switzerland	55.6	
	1	Giorgio Reggiani	Italy	DQ	
1	2	Roberto Frinolli	Italy	51.7	Q
2	2	Rainer Schubert	West Germany	53.4	Q
3	2	John Cook	Great Britain	54.3	Q
4	2	Wilfried Geeroms	Belgium	55.0	Q
5	2	Svatopluk Matolin	Czechoslovakia	55.2	
6	2	Athanasios Lazaridis	Greece	55.2	
1	3	John Sherwood	Great Britain	52.9	Q
2	3	Fritz Roth	West Germany	53.5	Q
3	3	Andrzej Skorupiński	Poland	53.8	Q
4	3	Robert Poirier	France	54.2	Q
5	3	Ferenc Oros	Hungary	54.5	
1	4	Anatoliy Kazakov	Soviet Union	53.5	Q
2	4	Jean-Jacques Behm	France	54.3	Q
3	4	Karel Brems	Belgium	54.6	Q
4	4	Hans Kocher	Switzerland	54.8	Q
5	4	Miroslav Hruš	Czechoslovakia	55.2	

=== Semifinals ===
Rank	Heat	Athlete	Nationality	Time	Notes
1	1	Ron Whitney	United States	51.6	Q
2	1	John Sherwood	Great Britain	52.1	Q
3	1	Robert Poirier	France	52.3	Q
4	1	Kiyoo Yui	Japan	52.4	Q
5	1	Fritz Roth	West Germany	52.6	
6	1	Hans Kocher	Switzerland	53.5	
7	1	Karel Brems	Belgium	53.5	
8	1	Dimcho Kovachev	Bulgaria	54.0	
1	2	Roberto Frinolli	Italy	51.0	Q
2	2	Anatoliy Kazakov	Soviet Union	51.6	Q
3	2	Rainer Schubert	West Germany	51.9	Q
4	2	John Cook	Great Britain	52.1	Q
5	2	Jean-Jacques Behm	France	52.6	
6	2	Miklós Vértessy	Hungary	53.0	
7	2	Andrzej Skorupiński	Poland	53.7	
	2	Wilfried Geeroms	Belgium	?	

=== Final ===
Rank	Name	Nationality	Time	Notes
1st place, gold medalist(s)	Roberto Frinolli	Italy	50.5	
2nd place, silver medalist(s)	Robert Poirier	France	50.7	
3rd place, bronze medalist(s)	Ron Whitney	United States	51.1	
4	Anatoliy Kazakov	Soviet Union	51.4	
5	John Sherwood	Great Britain	51.5	
6	John Cook	Great Britain	51.8	
7	Rainer Schubert	West Germany	52.4	
8	Kiyoo Yui	Japan	53.7	
