= Athletics at the 1967 Summer Universiade – Men's 400 metres hurdles =

The men's 110 metres hurdles event at the 1967 Summer Universiade was held at the National Olympic Stadium in Tokyo on 31 August and 1 September 1967.

== Medalists ==
| Gold | Silver | Bronze |
|---|---|---|
| Ron Whitney; United States | John Sherwood; Great Britain | Kiyoo Yui; Japan |

== Results ==
=== Heats ===
| Rank | Heat | Athlete | Nationality | Time | Notes |
|---|---|---|---|---|---|
| 1 | 1 | Ron Whitney | United States | 50.1 | Q |
| 2 | 1 | Kiyoo Yui | Japan | 51.9 | Q |
| 3 | 1 | Roy Fox | Great Britain | 52.3 | Q |
| 4 | 1 | Alessandro Scatena | Italy | 52.4 | Q |
| 5 | 1 | Steve Clark | Australia | 52.8 | |
| 6 | 1 | Alain Hebrard | France | 54.3 | |
| 7 | 1 | Oscar Prado | Brazil | 55.6 | |
| 8 | 1 | Miguel Alo | Philippines | 1:01.2 | |
| 1 | 2 | John Sherwood | Great Britain | 51.7 | Q |
| 2 | 2 | Rainer Schubert | West Germany | 52.4 | Q |
| 3 | 2 | Yukinori Akabori | Japan | 52.5 | Q |
| 4 | 2 | Angelo Vizzini | Italy | 53.2 | Q |
| 5 | 2 | Jurandir Ienne | Brazil | 53.4 | |
| 6 | 2 | Peter Griffin | Australia | 54.7 | |

=== Final ===
| Rank | Name | Nationality | Time | Notes |
|---|---|---|---|---|
| 1st place, gold medalist(s) | Ron Whitney | United States | 49.8 | UR |
| 2nd place, silver medalist(s) | John Sherwood | Great Britain | 50.2 | |
| 3rd place, bronze medalist(s) | Kiyoo Yui | Japan | 51.2 | |
| 4 | Rainer Schubert | West Germany | 52.0 | |
| 5 | Alessandro Scatena | Italy | 52.2 | |
| 6 | Yukinori Akabori | Japan | 52.2 | |
| 7 | Roy Fox | Great Britain | 52.3 | |
| 8 | Angelo Vizzini | Italy | 53.2 | |
