= Athletics at the 1967 Pan American Games – Men's 400 metres hurdles =

Men's 400 metres hurdles at the Pan American Games

The men's 400 metres hurdles event at the 1967 Pan American Games was held in Winnipeg on 30 July and 1 August.

== Medalists ==
Gold	Silver	Bronze
Ron Whitney; United States	Russ Rogers; United States	Bob McLaren; Canada

== Results ==
=== Heats ===
Rank	Heat	Name	Nationality	Time	Notes
1	1	Ron Whitney	United States	50.98	Q
2	2	Russ Roger	United States	51.29	Q
3	1	Bob McLaren	Canada	52.09	Q
4	2	Juan Carlos Dyrzka	Argentina	52.12	Q
5	1	Miguel Olivera	Cuba	52.21	Q
6	2	Juan Santiago Gordón	Chile	52.36	Q
7	2	Salvador Medina	Mexico	52.68	Q
8	2	Mark Arnold	Canada	52.83	
9	1	César Sánchez	Mexico	53.57	Q
10	1	Jorge Vallecilla	Ecuador	54.63	
	2	Miguel Villacres	Ecuador	DNS	

=== Final ===
Rank	Name	Nationality	Time	Notes
1st place, gold medalist(s)	Ron Whitney	United States	50.75	
2nd place, silver medalist(s)	Russ Roger	United States	51.31	
3rd place, bronze medalist(s)	Bob McLaren	Canada	51.44	
4	Miguel Olivera	Cuba	51.73	
5	Juan Carlos Dyrzka	Argentina	52.00	
6	Juan Santiago Gordón	Chile	52.86	
7	César Sánchez	Mexico	53.35	
8	Salvador Medina	Mexico	53.59	
