= Athletics at the 1970 Summer Universiade – Men's 400 metres hurdles =

The men's 400 metres hurdles event at the 1970 Summer Universiade was held at the Stadio Comunale in Turin with the final on 6 September 1970.

== Medalists ==
Gold	Silver	Bronze
Larry James; United States	Werner Reibert; West Germany	Dimitri Stukalov; Soviet Union

== Records ==
Standing records prior to the 1970 Summer Universiade
World record	David Hemery (GBR)	48.1	Mexico City, Mexico	15 October 1968
Universiade record	Ron Whitney (USA)	49.8	Tokyo, Japan	1967

== Results ==
=== Heats ===
Qualification: First 2 of each heat (Q) and the next 2 fastest (q) qualified for the final.

Rank	Heat	Name	Nationality	Time	Notes
1	1	Werner Reibert	West Germany	51.6	Q
2	1	Stavros Tziortzis	Greece	51.7	Q
3	1	Hiwoslav Kodais	Ivory Coast	52.3	
4	1	Carlos Martínez	Cuba	53.1	
5	1	Jaquin Paralta	Portugal	53.9	
6	1	George Neeland	Canada	57.7	
1	2	Alessandro Scatena	Italy	51.0	Q
2	2	Dimitri Stukalov	Soviet Union	51.4	Q
3	2	Francisco Suárez	Spain	51.6	q
4	2	Bob Roberts	Great Britain	52.2	
5	2	George Birbilis	Greece	52.8	
6	2	Antonio Matos	Portugal	54.7	
7	2	Abdellatif Trabeisi	Tunisia	55.8	
1	3	Larry James	United States	51.1	Q
2	3	Dieter Buttner	West Germany	51.3	Q
3	3	Juan García	Cuba	52.1	q
4	3	John Dillon	Ireland	52.3	
5	3	Robert Kropiunik	Austria	53.0	
6	3	Cengiz Akıncı	Turkey	53.6	
7	3	Brian Donnelly	Canada	57.4	

=== Final ===
Rank	Name	Nationality	Time	Notes
1st place, gold medalist(s)	Larry James	United States	50.2	
2nd place, silver medalist(s)	Werner Reibert	West Germany	50.4	
3rd place, bronze medalist(s)	Dimitri Stukalov	Soviet Union	50.7	
4	Alessandro Scatena	Italy	50.8	
5	Francisco Suárez	Spain	51.4	
6	Dieter Buttner	West Germany	51.6	
7	Stavros Tziortzis	Greece	51.6	
8	Juan García	Cuba	51.7	
