= Hansjörg Wirz =

Hansjörg Wirz (born 9 June 1943) is a Swiss sports official and retired hurdler.

As a hurdler he finished fourth at the 1969 European Championships and competed at the 1972 Olympic Games without reaching the final. He became Swiss champion in 1968, 1969 and 1972. His personal best time was 50.78 seconds (1972).

He served as the president of European Athletics from 1999 to 2015.

Sporting positions
Preceded by Carl-Olaf Homén	President of European Athletics; 1999–2015	Succeeded by Svein Arne Hansen
