= 1969 European Athletics Championships – Men's 400 metres hurdles =

Men's 400 metres hurdles at the European Athletics Championships

The men's 400 metres hurdles at the 1969 European Athletics Championships was held in Athens, Greece, at Georgios Karaiskakis Stadium on 16 and 18 September 1969.

== Medalists ==
Gold	Vyacheslav Skomorokhov; Soviet Union
Silver	John Sherwood; Great Britain
Bronze	Andy Todd; Great Britain

== Results ==
=== Final ===
18 September

Rank	Name	Nationality	Time	Notes
1st place, gold medalist(s)	Vyacheslav Skomorokhov	Soviet Union	49.70	
2nd place, silver medalist(s)	John Sherwood	Great Britain	50.10	
3rd place, bronze medalist(s)	Andy Todd	Great Britain	50.38	
4	Hansjörg Wirz	Switzerland	50.8	
5	François Huard	France	51.1	
6	Wilhelm Weistand	Poland	51.2	
7	Tadeusz Kulczycki	Poland	51.3	
8	Giorgio Ballati	Italy	52.4	

=== Heats ===
16 September

==== Heat 1 ====
Rank	Name	Nationality	Time	Notes
1	Vyacheslav Skomorokhov	Soviet Union	50.9	Q
2	François Huard	France	51.6	Q
3	Andy Todd	Great Britain	51.6	Q
4	Stavros Tziortzis	Greece	52.4	
5	Zdzisław Serafin	Poland	53.5	
6	Alberto Matos	Portugal	53.6	

==== Heat 2 ====
Rank	Name	Nationality	Time	Notes
1	Hansjörg Wirz	Switzerland	51.3	Q
2	John Sherwood	Great Britain	51.4	Q
3	Tadeusz Kulczycki	Poland	51.4	Q
4	Karel Brems	Belgium	52.5	
5	Zoran Majstorović	Yugoslavia	52.8	

==== Heat 3 ====
Rank	Name	Nationality	Time	Notes
1	Giorgio Ballati	Italy	51.20	Q
2	Wilhelm Weistand	Poland	51.60	Q
3	Zsoltan Ringhoffer	Hungary	51.80	
4	Anatoliy Kazakov	Soviet Union	52.20	
5	Khristo Gergov	Bulgaria	53.40	

== Participation ==
According to an unofficial count, 16 athletes from 12 countries participated in the event.

- Belgium (1)
- Bulgaria (1)
- France (1)
- Greece (1)
- Hungary (1)
- Italy (1)
- Poland (3)
- Portugal (1)
- Soviet Union (2)
- Switzerland (1)
- Great Britain (2)
- Yugoslavia (1)
