= Monaco at the 2016 European Athletics Championships =

- WA code: MON
- National federation: Monégasque Athletics Federation
- Website: www.fma.mc

in Amsterdam
- Competitors: 1
- Medals: Gold 0 Silver 0 Bronze 0 Total 0

European Athletics Championships appearances
- 2002; 2006; 2010; 2012; 2014; 2016; 2018; 2022; 2024

Monaco competed at the 2016 European Athletics Championships in Amsterdam, Netherlands, between 6 and 10 July 2016.

== Results ==
Men

Track & road events

Athlete	Event	Heat		Semifinal		Final	
Athlete	Event	Result	Rank	Result	Rank	Result	Rank
Brice Etès	800 m	1:50.53 SB	23	did not advance			
