= Miguel Olivera =

Cuban sprinter

Personal information
- Full name: Miguel de los Santos Olivera Álvarez
- Nationality: Cuban
- Born: 5 July 1946 (age 80) Unión de Reyes, Cuba
- Height: 1.77 m (5 ft 10 in)
- Weight: 63 kg (139 lb)

Sport
- Sport: Athletics
- Event: 400 metres hurdles

Miguel de los Santos Olivera Álvarez (born 5 July 1946) is a Cuban former sprinter who competed in the 1968 Summer Olympics.

== International competitions ==
Year	Competition	Venue	Position	Event	Notes
Representing Cuba
1966	Central American and Caribbean Games	San Juan, Puerto Rico	4th	400 m hurdles	53.8
1967	Central American and Caribbean Championships	Xalapa, Mexico	2nd	400 m hurdles	52.4
1967	Pan American Games	Winnipeg, Canada	4th	400 m hurdles	51.73
1968	Olympic Games	Mexico City, Mexico	26th (h)	400 m hurdles	51.9
1968	Olympic Games	Mexico City, Mexico	9th (h)	4 × 400 m relay	3:05.28
1969	Central American and Caribbean Championships	Havana, Cuba	1st	400 m hurdles	53.9
1970	Central American and Caribbean Games	Panama City, Panama	3rd	400 m hurdles	51.3
1970	Central American and Caribbean Games	Panama City, Panama	1st	4 × 400 m relay	3:06.4
1971	Central American and Caribbean Championships	Kingston, Jamaica	4th	400 m hurdles	54.7
1971	Pan American Games	Cali, Colombia	4th	400 m hurdles	52.05

== Personal bests ==
- 400 metres (hand) – 47.8h (1968)
- 400 metres hurdles (automatic) – 51.98 A (Mexico City 1968)
- 400 metres hurdles (hand) – 50.8h A (Mexico City 1967)
