= Svein Arne Hansen =

Norwegian sports official (1946–2020)

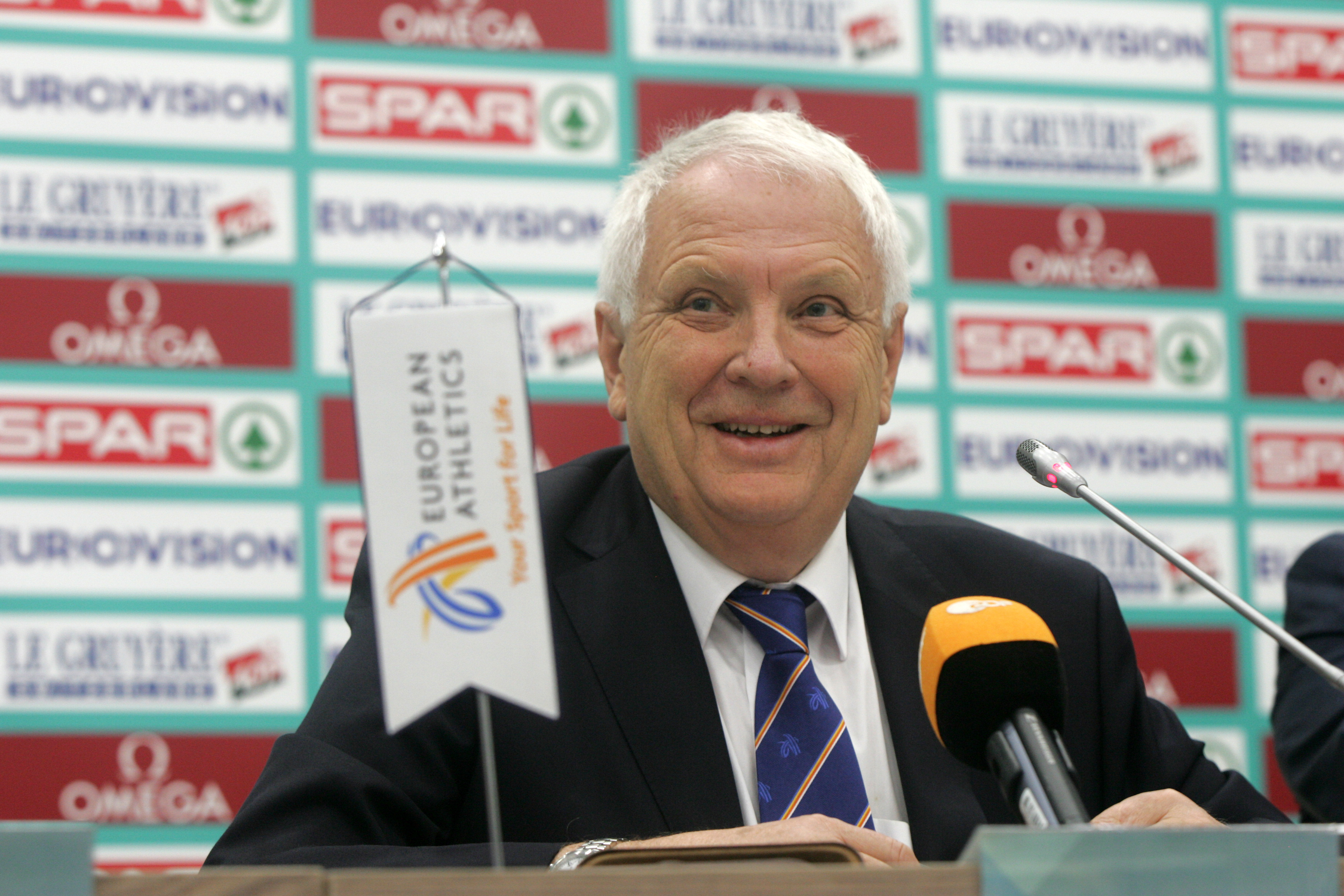
Svein Arne Hansen

Svein Arne Hansen (6 May 1946 – 20 June 2020) was a Norwegian sports official. At the time of his death, he was President of the European Athletic Association.

He was from Bygdøy and worked as a stamp trader outside of sports. He was formerly the meet director of Bislett Games, and advanced from vice president to president of the Norwegian Athletics Association in 2003.

He was also a deputy member of the Norwegian Confederation of Sports' electoral committee.

Hansen was a vocal proponent of lifetime bans for doping offenses.

After suffering a stroke in March 2020, Hansen died in June 2020.

Sporting positions
| Preceded by Marius Rooth | President of the Norwegian Athletics Association; 2003–2015 | Succeeded by Tore Hordnes |
| Preceded by Hansjörg Wirz | President of European Athletics; 2015–2020 | Succeeded by incumbent |
