= Monaco at the 2018 European Athletics Championships =

- WA code: MON
- National federation: Monégasque Athletics Federation
- Website: www.fma.mc

in Berlin
- Competitors: 1

European Athletics Championships appearances
- 2002; 2006; 2010; 2012; 2014; 2016; 2018; 2022; 2024

Monaco competed at the 2018 European Athletics Championships in Berlin, Germany, from 6–12 August 2018. A delegation of 1 athlete was sent to represent the country.

The following athlete was selected to compete by the Monegasque Athletics Federation.

Women
Track and road

Athletes	Event	Heats		Semifinal		Final	
Athletes	Event	Result	Rank	Result	Rank	Result	Rank
Marie Charlotte Gastaud	100 metres	13.59	35	did not advance			
