= Wes Brooker =

Canadian sprinter (born 1946)

Personal information
- Full name: Wesley Brooker
- Born: 21 December 1946 (age 79) Winnipeg, Manitoba, Canada
- Height: 183 cm (6 ft 0 in)
- Weight: 73 kg (161 lb)

Sport
- Sport: Sprinting
- Events: 4 × 400 metres relay; 400 metre hurdles

Wesley Brooker OLY (born 21 December 1946) is a retired Canadian sprinter. He competed in the men's 4 × 400 metres relay and the 400 metre hurdles at the 1968 Summer Olympics.
