= Boyd Gittins =

American hurdler (born 1946)

Boyd Gittins (born September 12, 1946) was an American track and field athlete who competed in the 400-meter hurdles. He was selected for the United States' 1968 Olympic team. He qualified for the Olympic team for the 440 yard hurdles despite competing in the national qualifying race in Los Angeles with pigeon droppings in his eyes. During his Olympic preparation, an adverse reaction to a mandatory smallpox vaccine caused a hamstring injury that forced him to withdraw from the Olympic competition two days before his race. He attended Shoreline Community College before getting an athletic scholarship to run for Washington State University and their Cougar's track team.

He was runner-up at the 1968 United States Olympic Trials to Geoff Vanderstock, who set a world record. Gittins' time of 49.27 seconds (49.1 in hand-timing) ranked him seventh in the world for that year.
