= European Athletic Association =

European athletics governing body

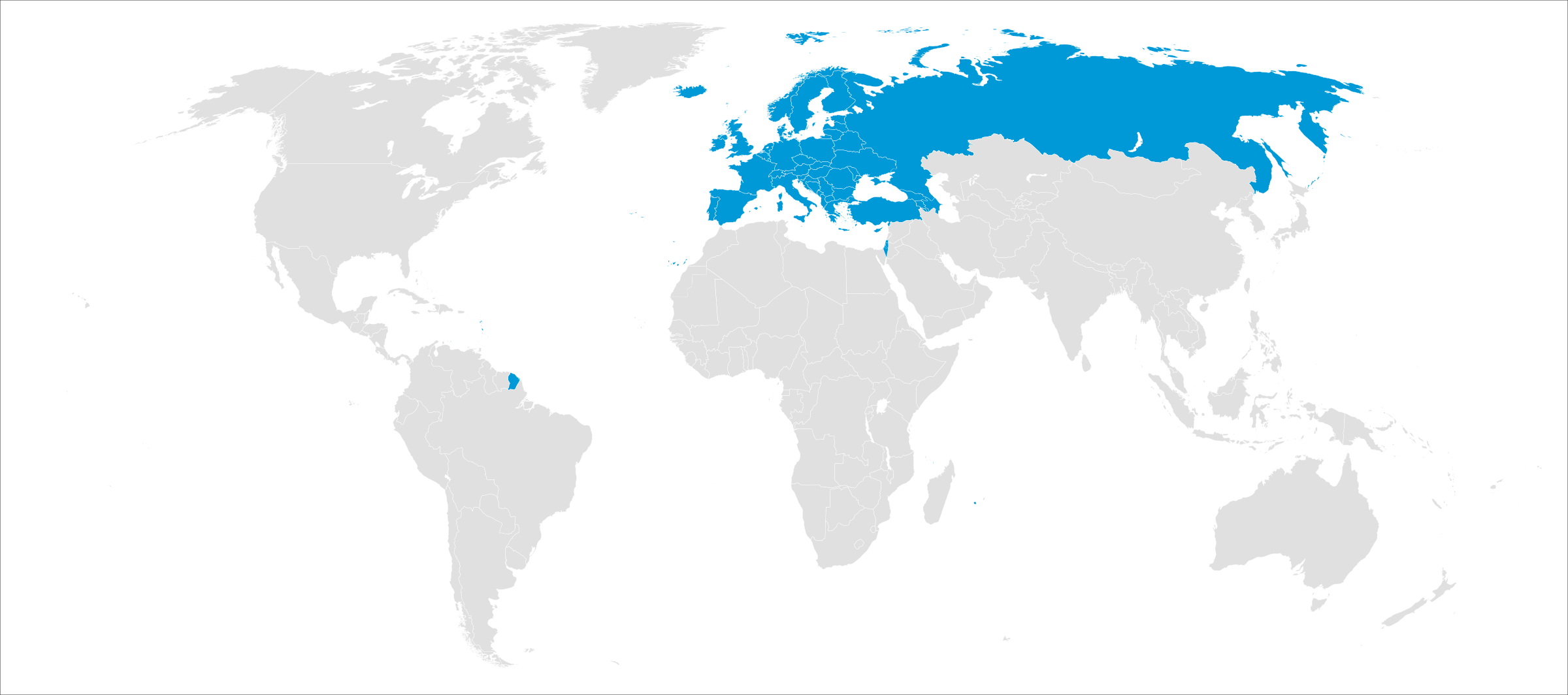
- Jurisdiction: Europe
- Membership: 51 national associations
- Abbreviation: European Athletics
- Founded: 1969
- Affiliation: World Athletics
- Headquarters: Lausanne, Switzerland
- President: Dobromir Karamarinov

Official website
- www.european-athletics.com

The European Athletic Association (EAA; more commonly known as European Athletics) is the governing body for athletics in Europe. It is one of the six Area Associations of the world's athletics governing body World Athletics. European Athletics has 51 members and is headquartered in Lausanne.

Originally created in 1932 as a European Committee, it was made into an independent body during the Bucharest conference of 1969. The first European Athletics congress took place in Paris on 6–8 October 1970, with Dutchman Adriaan Paulen elected as its first president. From a volunteer-led organization based in the acting Secretary's home country, European Athletics has developed into a professional organization with a permanent base in Switzerland.

European Athletics runs and regulates several championships and meetings across Europe – both indoor and outdoor.

== History ==
After the foundation of the International Association of Athletic Federations (IAAF) in 1912, it was clear there needed to be a European committee as part of the governing board. While the idea originally met with some resistance, it was the active promotion by the Hungarian representative Szilard Stankovits that bought the initiative to life following the Los Angeles congress of the IAAF in 1932. Following this meeting, the Council officially designated a European Commission (chaired by Stankovits) with the task of reviewing the conditions for the organisation of the European Athletics Championships.

The first official meeting of what was later to be known as the European Commission was held in Budapest on 7 January 1934. The organization of the first European Athletics Championships was officially awarded to Turin. These first games were men-only and were notable by the absence of the British delegation, which opposed an event seen as competing with its own British Empire Games. The next championships took place in Paris in 1938, but after Stankovits' death the same year and the cancellation of all events during WWII, the Commission lay dormant until 1945.

During the post-war period, and with an increase in membership both at IAAF and European levels, the Commission quickly changed to an independent association, including the related financial and political independence from its international parent. Its budget, for example, increased from £100 in 1951 (for postal expenses) to US$40,000 per year in 1970. It was also during that period that the Commission started experimenting and developing a greater range of events besides the European Championships: the European Junior Championships (1964), the European Cup (1965), the Indoor championships (1966).

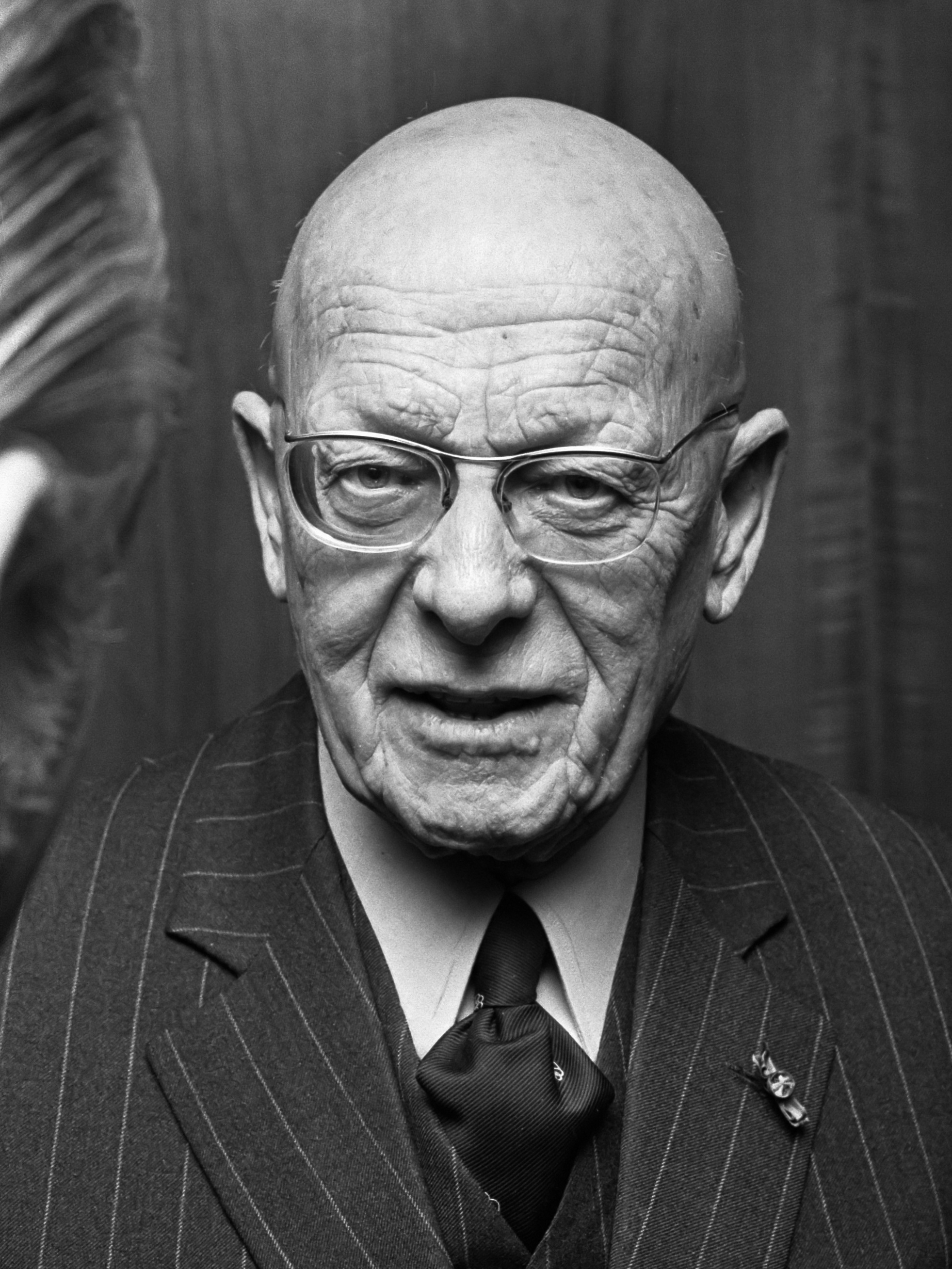
Adriaan Paulen, the Association's first president (1969–1976)

The Commission officially became a Committee in July 1952, gradually expanding its independence. The members of the Commission were elected at regular IAAF Congresses until 1966 when, for the first time, their selection became European-only. The shift also reflects the increased income received from television rights, as earnings took off as a direct result of broadcasting arrangements. The 1969 European championships secured a record US$90,000 from Eurovision for the rights to broadcast the event. It was then decided that the European Committee would directly receive these funds in order to benefit its members (rather than having it redistributed by the IAAF.)

On 31 October 1969, the Association of the European Members of the IAAF was constituted at a formal meeting of the European Committee of the IAAF in Bucharest. Its Constitutional Rules were ratified at the IAAF Congress in Stockholm, August 1970, and came into force at the first European Athletics Congress in Paris on 7 November 1970. Adriaan Paulen, who was president of the European Committee of the IAAF, was elected as the first President and simultaneously became (or remained) European representative on the IAAF Council. He held this position until his election as President of the IAAF in 1976.

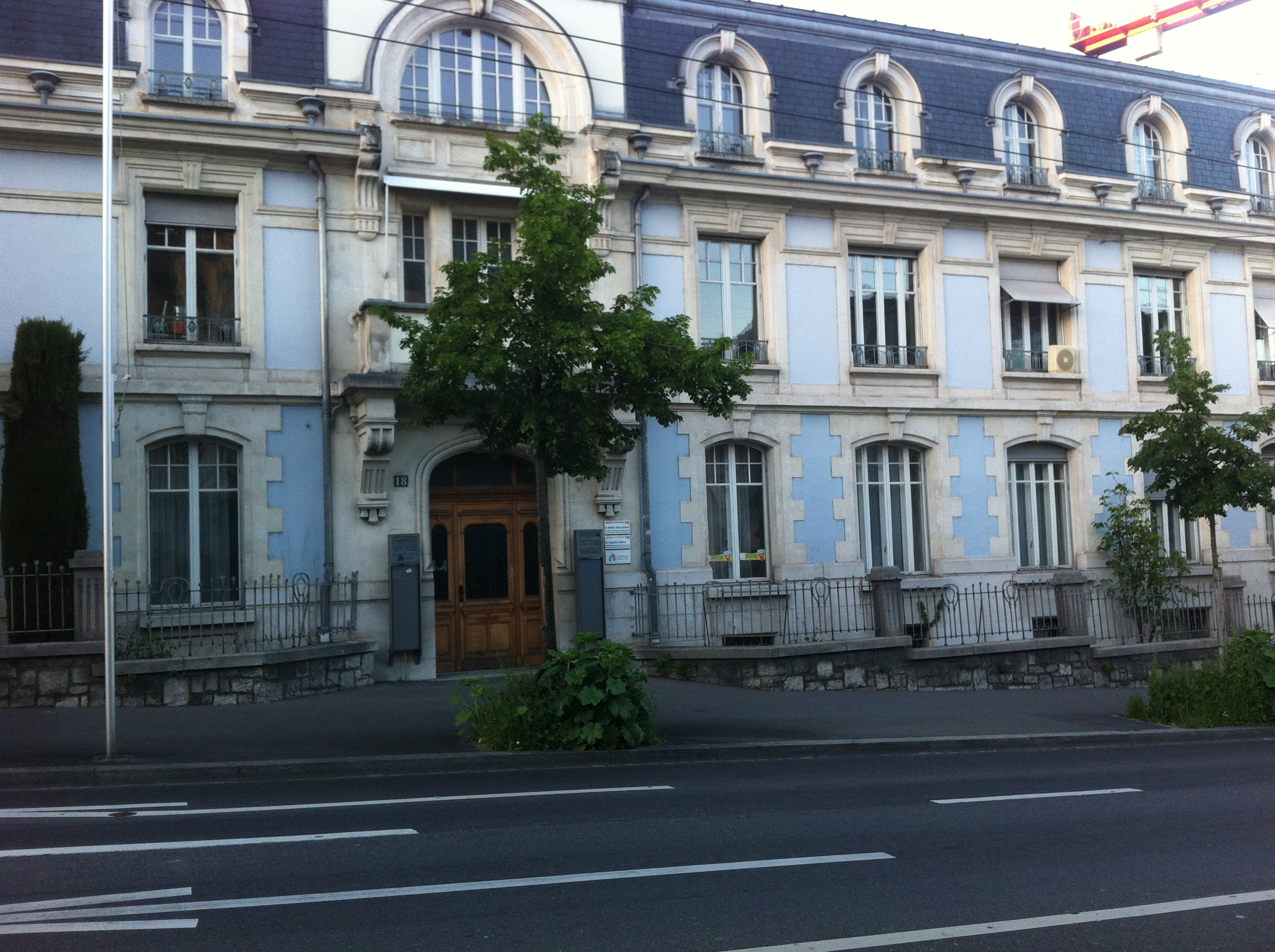
European Athletics' current headquarters in Lausanne.

The 1970s were also the time for European Athletics to raise the issue of doping. They started establishing more systematic controls, pushing for tests to be extended to non-European athletes as well. The European Championships of 1974 included a wider range of banned products than previously, with anabolic steroids being checked at all other subsequent events. As a continent, Europe clearly was "the nucleus of the IAAF" and an example to be followed for other IAAF members. As such, the European Association became an experimental platform for international athletics, organising events before they were recognized by the International Olympic Committee. For example, the women's marathon was included in the 1982 championships and became an Olympic distance for female athletes at the 1984 Summer Olympics.

The late 1980s saw major new challenges for sports in general, and European athletics in particular, with the increased professionalization of athletes and the breakdown of the Eastern Bloc. There was a huge increase in member federations (34 to 49 between 1987 and 1991) and the growing complexity of financial and commercial negotiations as well as an ever-expanding calendar of events meant that the organisation had to adapt. Till Luft, from Germany, became the first full-time General Secretary in 1995 and worked at the first European Athletics office in Frankfurt and, after April 1996, Darmstadt. A second office was also opened in London, next to the IAAF. A few years later, because of the somewhat unfavourable nature of the German tax system towards non-profit organizations, the proposal was made to merge both offices and move out of Germany. The move to Switzerland and necessary changes to Constitutional Rules were approved at the Athens Congress of 2003, and the new location opened in Lausanne (where several other sports organizations, including the IOC, were already located) on 1 January 2004.

== Members and Governance ==
European Athletics' governance is split between five bodies:

- The Congress, which is the general assembly of the Members and the supreme authority of the European Athletic Association;
- The Council, with the Executive Board and its President;
- The Commissions;
- The Head Office;
- The European Athletics Association Court.

=== Membership ===
European Athletics now has 51 members, with Kosovo having joined in 2015. Each member gets one vote at the Congress.

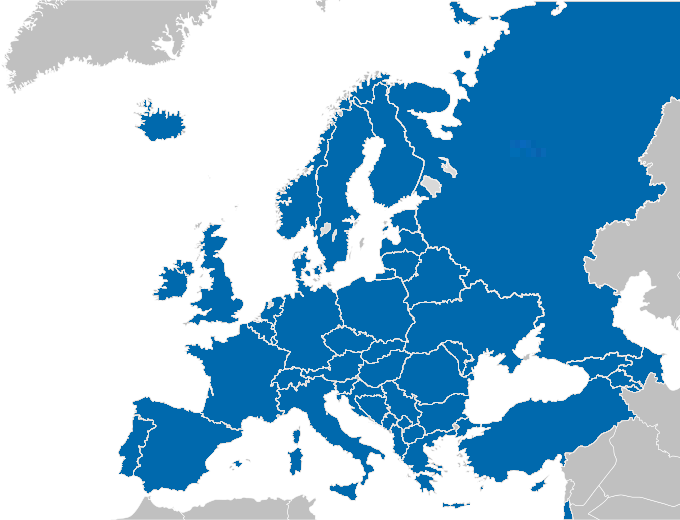
European Athletics Members

- (Albania) Albanian Athletics Federation
- (Andorra) Andorran Athletics Federation
- (Armenia) Armenian Athletic Federation
- (Austria) Austrian Athletics Federation
- Azerbaijan Athletics Federation
- Belarus Athletic Federation
- (Belgium) Royal Belgian Athletics Federation
- Athletic Federation of Bosnia and Herzegovina
- (Bulgaria) Bulgarian Athletic Federation
- (Croatia) Croatian Athletics Federation
- Amateur Athletic Association of Cyprus
- (Czech Republic) Czech Athletics Federation
- (Denmark) Danish Athletics Federation
- (Estonia) Estonian Athletic Association
- (Finland) Finnish Athletics Federation
- (France) French Athletics Federation
- (Georgia (country)) Athletic Federation of Georgia
- (Germany) German Athletics Association
- Gibraltar Amateur Athletic Association
- (Greece) Hellenic Amateur Athletic Association
- (Hungary) Hungarian Athletics Association
- (Iceland) Icelandic Athletic Federation
- (Republic of Ireland) Athletics Ireland
- (Israel) Israeli Athletic Association
- (Italy) Italian Athletics Federation
- Kosovo Athletic Federation
- (Latvia) Latvian Athletics Association
- Liechtenstein Association of Athletics Federations
- Athletics Federation of Lithuania
- Luxembourg Athletics Federation
- Malta Amateur Athletic Association
- Athletics Federation of Moldova
- (Monaco) Monégasque Athletics Federation
- Athletic Federation of Montenegro
- (Netherlands) Royal Dutch Athletics Federation
- Athletic Federation of North Macedonia
- (Norway) Norwegian Athletics Association
- (Poland) Polish Athletic Association
- (Portugal) Portuguese Athletics Federation
- (Romania) Romanian Athletics Federation
- ~~(Russia) Russian Athletics Federation~~ (suspended since 2015)
- San Marino Athletics Federation
- Athletics Federation of Serbia
- (Slovakia) Slovak Athletic Federation
- Athletic Federation of Slovenia
- (Spain) Royal Spanish Athletics Federation
- (Sweden) Swedish Athletics Association
- (Switzerland) Swiss Athletics Federation
- (Turkey) Turkish Athletic Federation
- (Ukraine) Ukrainian Athletic Federation
- (United Kingdom) UK Athletics

Since 2005, the European Athletic Association also has its own anthem, composed by the Armenian composer Gevorg Manasyan, which is used at the opening and closing of official events.

=== European Athletics Council ===
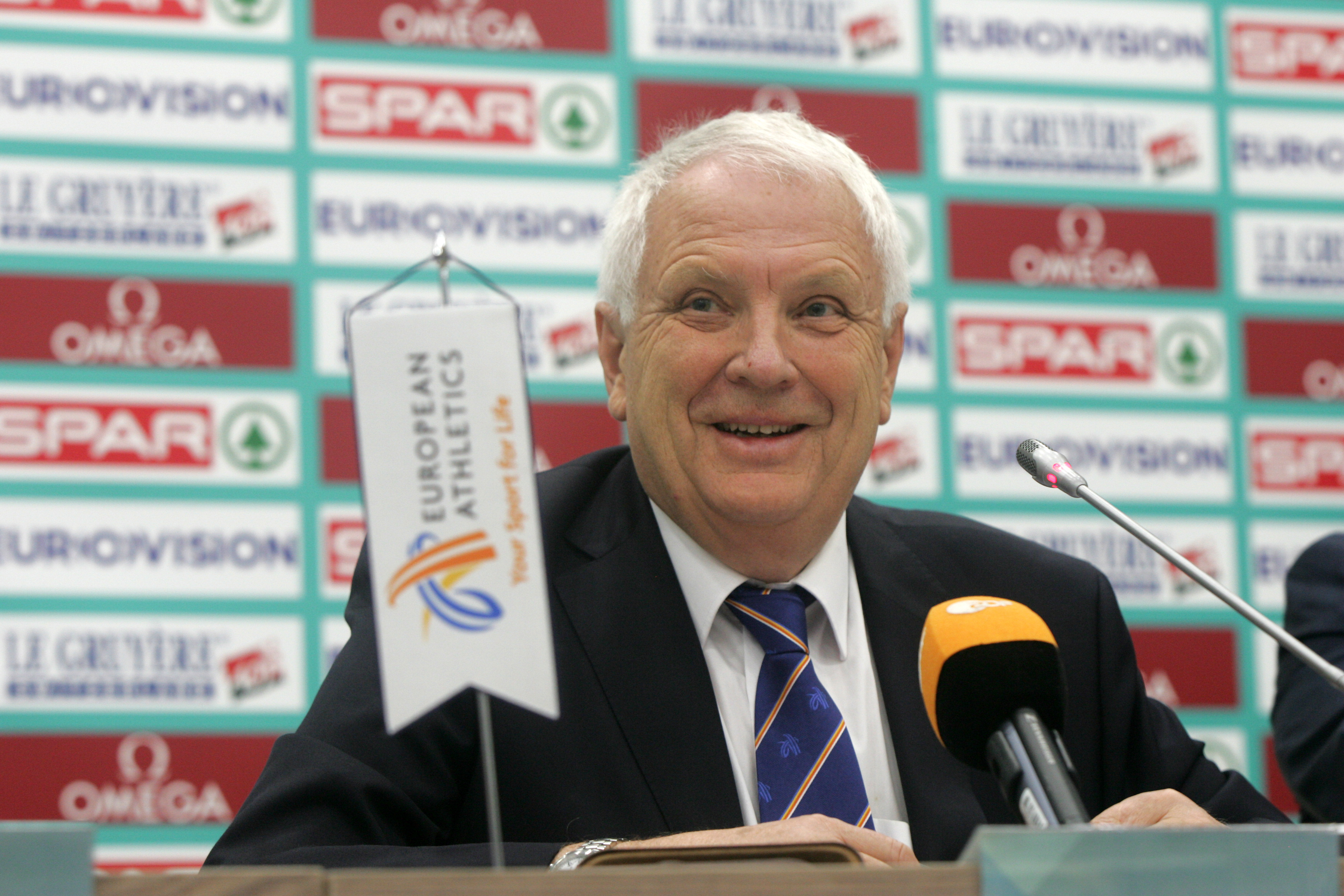
EAA Presidents (1969 – today) The last president Svein Arne Hansen
Name	Country	Tenure
Adriaan Paulen	Netherlands	1969–1976
Arthur Gold	United Kingdom	1976–1987
Carl-Olaf Homén	Finland	1987–1999
Hansjörg Wirz	Switzerland	1999–2015
Svein Arne Hansen	Norway	2015–2020
Dobromir Karamarinov	Bulgaria	2020–

The European Athletics Council consists of:

- Members of the European Athletics Executive Board

Executive Board members

- Dobromir Karamarinov, President
- Cherry Alexander, Vice-President (GBR)
- Libor Varhaník, Vice-President (CZE)
- Karin Grute Movin (SWE)
- Christian Milz, CEO Director General (ex officio).

Council members

- Sebastian Coe, President of World Athletics (ex officio)
- Slobodan Branković (SRB)
- Nadya But-Husaim (BLR)
- Raúl Chapado (ESP)
- Fatih Çintimar (TUR)
- Panagiotis Dimakos (GRE)
- Jean Gracia (FRA)
- Márton István Gyulai (HUN)
- Periklis Iakovakis (GRE) (Chair of the European Athletics Athletes Committee)
- Anna Kirnova (SVK)
- Antti Pihlakoski (FIN)
- Sonja Spendelhofer (AUT)
- Erich Teigamägi (EST)

The term of office for the Council is for the period from the effective date of its election to the conclusion of the next Ordinary Congress held in the year immediately preceding each Olympic Summer Games.

== Competitions ==
There are four broad categories under which competitions are held:

- Senior : all athletes over 23 years old;
- U23 : athletes aged from 20 to 22 years on 31 December of the year of the competition;
- U20 : athletes aged 16 to 19 years on 31 December of the year of the competition;
- U18 : athletes aged 16 to 17 years on 31 December of the year of the competition.

European Athletics organizes several official competitions at the European level,

European Athletics Championships	A biennial event where, when it coincides with the Summer Olympic Games, the marathon and racewalking events are not contested.
European Athletics Indoor Championships	A biennial event created in 1970, when it replaced the European Indoor Games.
European Cross Country Championships	An annual event inaugurated in 1994. Individual and national team medals awarded in each race.
European Athletics U23 Championships	A biennial event first held in 1997 and dedicated to athletes from 20 to 22 years of age.
European Athletics U20 Championships	A biennial event first held in 1964 for athletes from 16 to 19 years of age.
European Athletics U18 Championships	A biennial event first held in 2016 for athletes from 16 to 17 years of age. The event takes place in even numbered years, and alternates with the EOC's European Youth Olympic Festival which is held for the same age category in odd numbered years.
European Team Championships	The former European Cup is held annually (except during Olympic years) since 2009 and is the premier national team event for European athletics. Points are calculated by position in each event, total points are calculated by the combination of all women's and men's points, and there is promotion and relegation between the leagues based on the final results. Until 2023, the event consisted of four leagues (Super league, First, Second and Third leagues) with 20 events for men and women, held across four venues. From 2023 onwards, in co-operation with the European Games, the event consists of three divisions held in one venue.
European Combined Events Team Championships	First held in 1973, this annual competition (except in Olympic years) is dedicated to heptathlon and decathlon events in a national team setting. The championship takes place in three separate divisions – Super, First, and Second Leagues – and nations gain promotion and relegation between the leagues depending upon their performance.
European Race Walking Cup	A biennial racewalking event established in 1996, with both team and individual competitions.
European 10,000m Cup	A stand-alone 10,000 metres championship first held in 1997.
European Throwing Cup	An annual competition for athletes specialising in the events of shot put, discus, javelin and hammer throw. Usually held in March, it was inaugurated in 2001.
European Mountain Running Championships	A fell running race organized each year in July since 1995.
European Running Championships	A mass participation event in the style of Gran Fondo, set to first be held in Leuven and Brusselsin April 2025, and each second year thereafter, over 10 kilometeres, half marathon and marathon.

=== Club competitions ===
European Athletics also organises various club competitions, two track and field and one cross country.

- European Champion Clubs Cup (Senior)
- European Champion Clubs Cup (Junior)
- European Champion Clubs Cup Cross Country

== Meetings ==
Any indoor or outdoor meeting within Europe, which invites international athletes and offers a prize money, appearance fee, and/or the value of non-cash prizes in excess of a certain amount is required to have a permit from European Athletic. The distinction between Premium, Classic and Special Premium meetings lies essentially in the number of mandatory events, level of attendance, stadium capacity, as well as commercial conditions and the number of doping controls. Classic Meeting requirements are less stringent than Premium, whereas Special Premium Meetings have a restricted programme of events (and therefore a reduced number of participating athletes).

=== Outdoor Permit Meetings ===
During the European Athletics Outdoor Season 2018 a total of 21 meetings — including Premium, Special Premium and Classic – are scheduled to be held:

Outdoor Premium Meetings

- (Switzerland) Spitzen Leichtathletik Luzern, Lucerne
- (Italy) Palio Città della Quercia, Rovereto

Outdoor Special Premium Meetings

- (Greece) Street Pole Vault, Athens

Outdoor Classic Meetings

- (Spain) Memorial Francisco Ramón Higueras, Andújar
- (Poland) European Athletics Festival Bydgoszcz, Bydgoszcz
- (Poland) Janusz Kusociński Memorial, Chorzów
- (Poland) Irena Szewińska Memorial, Bydgoszcz
- (Denmark) Copenhagen Athletics Games
- (Sweden) Gothenburg Athletics Grand Prix
- (Belgium) KBC Night of Athletics, Heusden-Zolder
- (Spain) Meeting Iberoamericano de Atletismo, Huelva
- (Sweden) Karlstad Grand Prix
- (Belgium) Meeting international de la province de Liège
- (France) Meeting de Marseille
- (France) Meeting international de Montreuil
- (France) Meeting international Stanislas, Nancy
- (Italy) Meeting Città di Padova, Padua
- (Czech Republic) Josef Odložil Memorial, Prague
- (Hungary) Gyulai István Memorial, Székesfehérvár
- (France) Meeting international de Sotteville
- (Sweden) Grand Prix Sollentuna

=== Outdoor Area Permit Meetings ===
Current or previous Outdoor Area Permit Meetings

- (Spain) Medio Maraton Internacional Azkoitia-Azpeitia Memorial Diego Garcia, Azkoitia
- (Spain) Meeting Internacional de Arona
- (Spain) Reunion Internacional de Atletismo "Villa de Bilbao"
- (Republic of Ireland) Cork City Sports
- (Republic of Ireland) Morton Games, Dublin
- (France) Meeting Féminin du Val d'Oise, Eaubonne
- (France) Meeting Elite de Forbach
- (Sweden) Folksam Challenge, Helsingborg, Umeå
- (Latvia) Janis Lusis Cup, Jelgava
- (Finland) Joensuu Games
- (Finland) Savo Games, Lapinlahti
- (Italy) Meeting Sport Solidarietà, Lignano Sabbiadoro
- (France) Meeting Elite en Salle de Metz
- (France) Meeting Elite en Salle de Mondeville
- (France) Meeting de Montgeron
- (Latvia) President Cup, Riga
- (Poland) Janusz Sidlo Memorial, Sopot
- (Poland) Kamila Skolimowska Memorial, Sopot
- (Switzerland) Citius Meeting, Bern
- (Georgia (country)) Caucasian Cup, Tbilisi
- (Finland) Paavo Nurmi Games, Turku
- (Czech Republic) Turnov
- (Russia) Znamensky Memorial, Zhukovsky

=== Indoor Meetings ===
Current or previous Indoor Classic Permit Meetings:

- (Republic of Ireland) AIT International Grand Prix, Athlone
- (Serbia) Serbian Open, Belgrade
- (France) All Star Perche, Clermont-Ferrand
- (Belgium) IFAM Meeting, Ghent
- (Turkey) Istanbul Athletics Cup
- (France) Meeting Pas de Calais, Liévin
- (Austria) Gugl Indoor Meeting, Linz
- (Poland) Orlen Cup, Łódź
- (Czech Republic) Czech Indoor Gala, Ostrava
- (France) Paris Indoor, Paris
- (Iceland) RIG Games, Reykjavík
- (Estonia) Combined Events Meeting, Tallinn
- (Sweden) Sparet Grand Prix, Stockholm

=== Cross Country Permit Meetings ===
During the European Athletics Cross Country season 2017–18 a total of 13 meetings are scheduled to be held:

- (Sweden) Lidingöloppet, Lidingö
- (Denmark) European Halloween Cross, Middelfart
- (Germany) Pforzheim-Huchenfeld Cross
- (Austria) Wyndham Grand CrossAttack, Salzburg-Rif
- Cross de l'Acier, Leffrinckoucke
- (Germany) Darmstadt Cross
- (Spain) Cross Internacional, Alcobendas
- (Netherlands) International Warandercross, Tilburg
- (United Kingdom) Great Edinburgh Cross, Edinburgh
- (Netherlands) Abdycross, Kerkrade
- Campaccio, San Giorgio su Legnano
- Cross della Vallagarina, Villa Lagarina – Rovereto
- Lotto Cross Cup de Hannut, Hannut

=== Race Walking Permit Meetings ===
- International Walking Festival Alytus
- Dudince
- Poděbrady

== Sponsors ==
The European Athletic Association is the owner of all rights emanating from European athletics competitions and activities. Its current official sponsors are:

- SPAR
- Gruyère AOP
- Eurovision

== See also ==
- European Athlete of the Year
- European Athlete of the Month
- List of European records in athletics
