= Monaco at the 2010 European Athletics Championships =

Sporting event delegation

- WA code: MON
- National federation: Monégasque Athletics Federation
- Website: www.fma.mc

in Barcelona
- Medals: Gold 0 Silver 0 Bronze 0 Total 0

European Athletics Championships appearances
- 2002; 2006; 2010; 2012; 2014; 2016; 2018; 2022; 2024

Monaco was represented by one athlete at the 2010 European Athletics Championships held in Barcelona, Spain.

== Participants ==
Event	Men	Women
800 m	Brice Etes	

Brice Etes (born 11 April 1984) has broken the National Record on 800m, 1:47.61, during the Herculis Meeting (Diamond League) in Monaco, on 22 July 2010.

== Results ==
2010 Barcelona	Gold	Silver	Bronze	Total
Monaco (MON)	0	0	0	0

=== Men ===
Track and road events

Event	Athletes	Heat		Semifinal		Final	
Event	Athletes	Result	Rank	Result	Rank	Result	Rank
800 m	Brice Etes	1:48.54	3 Q	1:49.52	15	did not advance	
