= Zambrose Abdul Rahman =

Malaysian hurdler (1944–2020)

Personal information
- Nationality: Malaysian
- Born: 18 January 1944 Seremban, Malaysia
- Died: 6 June 2020 (aged 76) Seremban, Malaysia

Sport
- Sport: Track and field
- Event: 400 metres hurdles

Zambrose Abdul Rahman (18 January 1944 – 6 June 2020) was a Malaysian hurdler. He competed in the men's 400 metres hurdles at the 1968 Summer Olympics.

After his retirement, he worked as an athletics coach for the Telekom Malaysia company team.
