= Georgios Birmbilis =

Greek hurdler

Personal information
- Nationality: Greek
- Born: 3 April 1945
- Died: 10 August 2021 (aged 76)

Sport
- Sport: Track and field
- Event: 400 metres hurdles
Medal record
Men's athletics
Representing Greece
Balkan Championships
Bronze medal – third place	1968 Piraeus	400 m hurdles
Silver medal – second place	1971 Zagreb	400 m hurdles
Silver medal – second place	1971 Zagreb	4 × 400 m relay
Bronze medal – third place	1972 İzmir	400 m hurdles

Georgios Birmbilis (Greek: Γεώργιος Μπιρμπιλής; 3 April 1945 – 10 August 2021) was a Greek hurdler. He was a three-time Greek Athletics Championships winner and won medals at the Balkan Athletics Championships. He also competed in the men's 400 metres hurdles at the 1968 Summer Olympics.

== Career ==
In August 1968, Birmbilis won his first Greek Athletics Championships titles in both the 400 m hurdles and the 110 m hurdles. In September, he won the 400 m hurdles bronze medal at the Balkan Athletics Championships. Later that year in October, he placed 8th in his Olympic 400 m hurdles heat in 52.62 seconds.

He won the 1500 metres at the Greek Athletics Championships the following year, running 3:47.4. At the 1970 World University Games, Birmbilis placed 5th in his 400 m hurdles semi-final.

Birmbilis won silver medals in both the 400 m hurdles and the 4 × 400 m relay at the 1971 Balkan Athletics Championships in Zagreb. He also set his 400 m hurdles personal best that year of 51.1 seconds. Birmbilis qualified for the finals of the 1971 Mediterranean Games 400 m hurdles, where he finished 6th.

He won another bronze medal at the 1972 Balkan Championships, running 51.7 seconds in the 400 m hurdles.

== Personal life ==
Birmbilis competed representing the Panellinios G.S. club. He died on 10 August 2021.
