= Monaco at the 2012 European Athletics Championships =

- WA code: MON
- National federation: Monégasque Athletics Federation
- Website: www.fma.mc

in Helsinki
- Medals: Gold 0 Silver 0 Bronze 0 Total 0

European Athletics Championships appearances
- 2002; 2006; 2010; 2012; 2014; 2016; 2018; 2022; 2024

Monaco competed at the 2012 European Athletics Championships held in Helsinki, Finland, between 27 June to 1 July 2012. One competitor, one man took part in one event.

== Results ==
=== Men ===
Track events

Event	Athletes	Heat		Semifinal		Final	
Event	Athletes	Result	Rank	Result	Rank	Result	Rank
800 m	Brice Etes	DNF		did not advance			
