= Monaco at the 2024 European Athletics Championships =

- Flag of Monaco
- WA code: MON

in Rome, Italy 7 June 2024 – 12 June 2022
- Competitors: 1 (1 woman)

European Athletics Championships appearances
- 2002; 2006; 2010; 2012; 2014; 2016; 2018; 2022; 2024

Monaco competed at the 2024 European Athletics Championships in Rome, Italy from 7–12 June 2024.

== Results ==
Monaco entered the following athletes.

Key

- Q = Qualified for the next round
- q = Qualified for the next round as a fastest loser or, in field events, by position without achieving the qualifying target
- NR = National record
- PB = Personal best
- SB = Season best
- N/A = Round not applicable for the event

=== Women ===
Track and road events

Athlete	Event	Heat		Semifinal		Final	
Athlete	Event	Result	Rank	Result	Rank	Result	Rank
Marie-Charlotte Gastaud	100 metres	12.52 =PB	23	Did not advance			
