= Carl-Olaf Homén =

Finnish attorney and sports administrator

Carl-Olaf Homén (born 24 March 1936 Helsinki) is a Swedish-speaking Finnish attorney, sports administrator and a former Finnish defence minister.

Homén was a talented middle-distance runner and graduated from the University of Delaware in 1960. He was the president of Finnish Olympic Committee 1984–1988, the president of Finnish Amateur Athletic Association 1977–1980 and the president of Finnish Sports Federation 2000–2003. Homén is a member of the Swedish People's Party of Finland and served as the Minister of Defence of Finland from October 1974 to June 1975.

Internationally he is best known as a member of the board of International Association of Athletics Federations IAAF and as a president of the European Athletic Association EAA from 1987 to 1999.
