= Geoff Vanderstock =

American hurdler

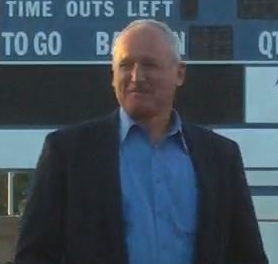

Personal information
- Nationality: American
- Born: October 8, 1946 (age 79) Chicago, Illinois, USA
- Height: 186 cm (6 ft 1 in)
- Weight: 77 kg (170 lb)

Sport
- Sport: Athletics
- Event: hurdles
- Club: USC Trojans

Geoffrey Peter Vanderstock (born October 8, 1946) is an American track and field athlete primarily known for running hurdles. He was once the world record holder in the 400 metres hurdles. His 48.94 was set at the high altitude United States Olympic Trials at Echo Summit, California, on September 11, 1968. He was the first man to run the event under 49 seconds. The hand time took .3 off the previous record held by Rex Cawley.

== Biography ==
In high school, he finished 4th in the 120 yard high hurdles, running 14.2 at the 1964 CIF California State Meet competing for Pomona Catholic High School which is now split into two schools one known as Damien High School for the boys and Pomona Catholic Girls High School for their female counterparts. At the Golden West Invitational, the equivalent of a National High School Championship meet, he tied for 3rd in 120y HH in 14.2 and was also 3rd in the 180y LH in 19.0. During that season he was also a 6'4" high jumper and pole vaulted 13'6".

He next competed for the Mt. San Antonio College, where he took up the 400 metres hurdles, achieving second at the AAU USA Outdoor Track and Field Championships and setting the national junior college record at 51.2. While at Mt. SAC, he also joined future pole vault gold medalist Bob Seagren in setting the national junior college record in the shuttle hurdles relay. He then went to the University of Southern California, finishing third in the 1968 NCAA Men's Outdoor Track and Field Championships and was a two time All-American He was ranked in the top ten American 400 metre hurdlers 5 straight years 1965-1969, including two years, 1966 and 1968 ranked as number one.

At the 1968 Olympic Games in Mexico City, he finished 4th in a tight race between 2nd place and 4th place, and was given a time of 49.06. The gold medal winner David Hemery demolished Vanderstock's world record running 48.12 in the final.

He is now a San Fernando Valley real estate broker. He appeared in the 1979 track and field oriented movie Goldengirl, the 1989 movie Tango & Cash, and made a couple of appearances in the 1987 FOX comedy TV series Mr. President.
