= Robert McLaren (hurdler) =

Canadian hurdler

Personal information
- Nationality: Canadian
- Born: 19 April 1945 (age 80) Victoria, British Columbia, Canada

Sport
- Sport: Track and field
- Event: 400 metres hurdles

Robert McLaren (born 19 April 1945) is a Canadian hurdler. He competed in the men's 400 metres hurdles at the 1968 Summer Olympics.
