= Wilhelm Weistand =

Polish hurdler (born 1945)

Personal information
- Nationality: Polish
- Born: 8 September 1945 (age 80)

Sport
- Sport: Track and field
- Event: 400 metres hurdles

Wilhelm Weistand (born 8 September 1945) is a Polish hurdler. He competed in the men's 400 metres hurdles at the 1968 Summer Olympics.
