= John Sherwood (athlete) =

British hurdler (1945–2025)

Personal information
- Nationality: British (English)
- Born: 4 June 1945 Selby, West Riding of Yorkshire, England
- Died: 19 August 2025 (aged 80) Sheffield, England

Sport
- Sport: Athletics
- Event: 400 hurdles
- Club: Birchfield Harriers; Sheffield City AC
Medal record
Men's athletics
Representing Great Britain
Olympic Games
Bronze medal – third place	1968 Mexico City	400 m hurdles
European Championships
Silver medal – second place	1969 Athens	400 m hurdles
Summer Universiade
Silver medal – second place	1967 Tokyo	400m hurdles
Silver medal – second place	1967 Tokyo	4x400m relay
Representing England
Commonwealth Games
Gold medal – first place	1970 Edinburgh	400 m hurdles

John Sherwood (4 June 1945 – 19 August 2025) was a British athlete who competed at three Olympic Games.

== Athletics career ==
Sherwood won the bronze medal in the Olympic Games in Mexico City in 1968 for the 400 m hurdles. His time was 49.03 seconds, and he was third behind fellow British athlete David Hemery, who took gold, and German Gerhard Hennige (silver). The commentator, David Coleman, who in his great excitement after Hemery won, made the rather unfortunate remark "who cares who's third - it doesn't matter!" It was an early example of so-called Colemanballs.

Sherwood also won a silver medal in the European Athletics Championships in 1969 and a gold medal in the Commonwealth Games in 1970. He also represented England in the 400 metres hurdles event, at the 1966 Commonwealth Games and the 1974 British Commonwealth Games in Christchurch, New Zealand.

Sherwood was a four-time British 440y/400m hurdles champion after winning the British AAA Championships titles at the 1966 AAA Championships, 1967 AAA Championships, 1969 AAA Championships and 1971 AAA Championships.

He was a regular on the popular BBC sports programme The Superstars in the '70s and early '80s and in 1980 came 2nd in the World Superstars Final in America. He had to turn professional to compete in the 100 metres of the 1980 UK grand final of the programme, as he would not have been able to keep his amateur status if he competed. He had the option not to run but chose to.

== Personal life and death ==
Sherwood studied at the Loughborough College of Education and was married to Sheila Sherwood, who won a silver medal at the same Olympics in the long jump. In his closing address in the successful bid for the 2012 Olympic Games in London, Lord Coe described how as a youngster in Sheffield in 1968, John and Sheila Sherwood had inspired him to pursue his successful career in track athletics.

He was the father of tennis player David Sherwood, a member of the British Davis Cup team. He was also the brother of Steve Sherwood, the former Chelsea and Watford goalkeeper.

After 40 years of teaching PE, 37 of those at Firth Park Community Arts College, Sheffield, John retired in 2006 after a finale school sports day on 12 July at the Don Valley Stadium which was closed with an address from Lord Coe.

Sherwood died on 19 August 2025, at the age of 80.
