= David Hemery =

English hurdler

David Hemery CBE DL
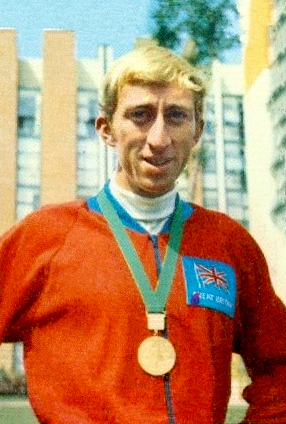

Personal information
- Born: 18 July 1944 (age 81) Cirencester, Gloucestershire, England
- Height: 1.87 m (6 ft 2 in)
- Weight: 72 kg (159 lb)

Sport
- Sport: Athletics
- Events: 400 m, 110 m hurdles, 400 m hurdles, decathlon
- Club: Hillingdon AC; Boston University Terriers, USA

Achievements and titles
- Personal bests: 400 m – 46.6y (1968); 110 mH – 13.4 (1970); 400 mH – 48.12 (1968); Decathlon – 6893* (1969)
Medal record
Men's athletics
Representing Great Britain
Olympic Games
| Gold medal – first place | 1968 Mexico City | 400 m hurdles |
| Silver medal – second place | 1972 Munich | 4 × 400 m relay |
| Bronze medal – third place | 1972 Munich | 400 m Hurdles |
European Championships
| Silver medal – second place | 1969 Athens | 110 m hurdles |
Representing England
Commonwealth Games
| Gold medal – first place | 1966 Kingston | 120 yard hurdles |
| Gold medal – first place | 1970 Edinburgh | 110 metre hurdles |

David Peter Hemery (born 18 July 1944) is an English former track and field athlete. He was the winner of the 400 metres hurdles at the 1968 Summer Olympics in Mexico City in a new world record.

== Early life ==
Hemery was born in Cirencester, Gloucestershire, but his father's accounting work took the family to the United States, where he attended school and graduated from Boston University. At one point the family had returned to Britain for a time, and Hemery moved back and forth across the Atlantic during his training.

== Athletics career ==
Hemery's first international title came at the 1966 Commonwealth Games in Kingston, Jamaica, where he won the 120 yd hurdles in 14.1 seconds, a title he retained four years later at the 1970 Commonwealth Games (by then it was the 110 m hurdles which he won in 13.8 seconds).

At the Mexico City Olympics in 1968, Hemery won the 400 m hurdles in 48.12 seconds, a new world record. His margin of victory was the largest since 1924, beating second-placed Gerhard Hennige from West Germany by almost a second. After Hemery crossed the line BBC commentator David Coleman famously exclaimed "Who cares who's third – it doesn't matter!" Hemery's British teammate John Sherwood turned out to be the bronze medal winner in a close finish that had to be settled by photo finish. Hemery's performance helped him win the 1968 BBC Sports Personality of the Year.

In 1969, Hemery won a silver at the European Championships in the 110 m hurdles, but missed the next European Championships in 1971 due to injury. At the 1972 Summer Olympics in Munich, Hemery defended his title and finished third, behind John Akii-Bua from Uganda and Ralph Mann from the United States. He was also a member of the silver medal-winning British 4 × 400 m relay team, one of whose members was David Jenkins.

Hemery was twice the British 120y/100m metres hurdles champion after winning the British AAA Championships titles at the 1966 AAA Championships and 1970 AAA Championships. Additionally he the British 440y/400m hurdles champion after winning the British AAA Championships titles at the 1968 AAA Championships and 1972 AAA Championships.

== Superstars ==
Hemery won the first ever British Superstars competition, held in 1973, registering a second victory in 1976, and was recognised as Britain's best Superstar from 1973 to 1977.

As a recently retired athlete, Hemery was free to participate in the professional Superstars contests and keep any prize money he won – unlike many other competitors (like Kjell Isaksson or Andy Ripley). Noticing the very high standard of competition within a short time of the event starting, Hemery created his own training regime, becoming adept at the gymnasium tests and canoeing and propelling himself into national fame.

After winning the original British title, Hemery then entered the 1974 event though he was struggling with illness. Eventually narrowly beaten by John Conteh, Hemery then went on to the 1975 European contest where he was beaten again, this time by Ties Kruize. When Kruize suffered serious injuries in a car crash before the final, Hemery was invited to participate and performed bravely, scoring points in every event. He was soundly beaten by Kjell Isaksson, but could still finish second. The rules for European Superstars allowed athletes to compete in "near specialist" events with a handicap, meaning that both Hemery and Isaksson were allowed to run in the 100 m and Steeplechase, but only after giving the other finalists a head start. In the final 600 m Steeplechase event Hemery had to make up a 100 m handicap on his rivals in order to finish in overall second, and valiantly did so, but only after again falling badly at the water jump. Hitting the ground hard while challenging Isaksson for the lead, Hemery rose with a grimace of pain on his face then sprinted for the line, grabbing third. However, as soon as the race was over he collapsed, with the TV cameras showing huge swelling to his injured leg – he had run the last 100 m with badly torn ankle ligaments.

In 1976 Hemery won back his British title with a dominating performance. He could not qualify for the European Final this year (beaten by Isaksson again), so he then tried his hand at the American version, qualifying for the final before finishing a disappointing 11th. Because of this sojourn to the US, Hemery was not eligible to compete in the inaugural 1977 World Final, and he did not compete again in individual Superstars again until the 1981 Challenge of the Champions, where he finished joint fourth with his great hurdling rival John Sherwood. Winning the 1983 Past Masters event enabled him to compete in the 1984 International Final (where he finished third, though 40 years old).

=== Superstars record ===
| Year | Event | Position |
|---|---|---|
| 1973 | British Final | 1st |
| 1974 | British Final | 2nd |
| 1975 | UK Heat | 2nd |
| 1975 | European Final | 2nd |
| 1976 | British Final | 1st |
| 1976 | US Heat 1 | 3rd |
| 1976 | US Final | 11th |
| 1976 | Swedish Heat | 3rd |
| 1981 | Challenge of the Champions | 4th |
| 1983 | UK Past Masters | 1st |
| 1984 | International | 3rd |

== Later life ==
After his running career, Hemery worked as a coach in the United States and Great Britain. He returned to his alma mater, Boston University, at which as track coach he was widely admired by his student athletes and in which post he succeeded in recruiting many top-notch British runners to Boston University. In the 1969 New Year Honours he was appointed a Member of the Most Excellent Order of the British Empire (MBE), before being promoted to Commander (CBE) in the 2003 Birthday Honours, in both cases for services to athletics. He received a master's degree in education from Harvard University. For a period in the 1970s he taught at the famous English school Millfield. In 1998, he was elected as the first president of UK Athletics. In 2011 Hemery became the first Briton to be awarded the European Olympic Committee's Laurel Award for services to sport. In 2015, he ran the London Marathon to raise money for the charity that he had founded - '21st Century Legacy'.

In 2016, Hemery was appointed Deputy Lieutenant of Wiltshire.

== Author ==
Hemery has written several books.

- Another hurdle: The making of an Olympic champion, 1976, ISBN 978-080-080233-2
- The Pursuit Of Sporting Excellence A Study Of Sport's Highest Achievers, 1986, ISBN 978-087-322131-3
- Athletics in Action, 1987, ISBN 978-009-166601-9
- Winning Without Drugs, with Alan Evans, Guy Ogden, 1990, ISBN 978-000-218349-9
- Sporting Excellence: What Makes a Champion? 1991, ISBN 978-000-218398-7
- How to Help Children Find the Champion Within Themselves, 2005, ISBN 978-056-351968-3

== Bibliography ==
- David Hemery, Another Hurdle, Heinemann, London, 1976. His autobiography.
