= Robert Poirier =

French hurdler

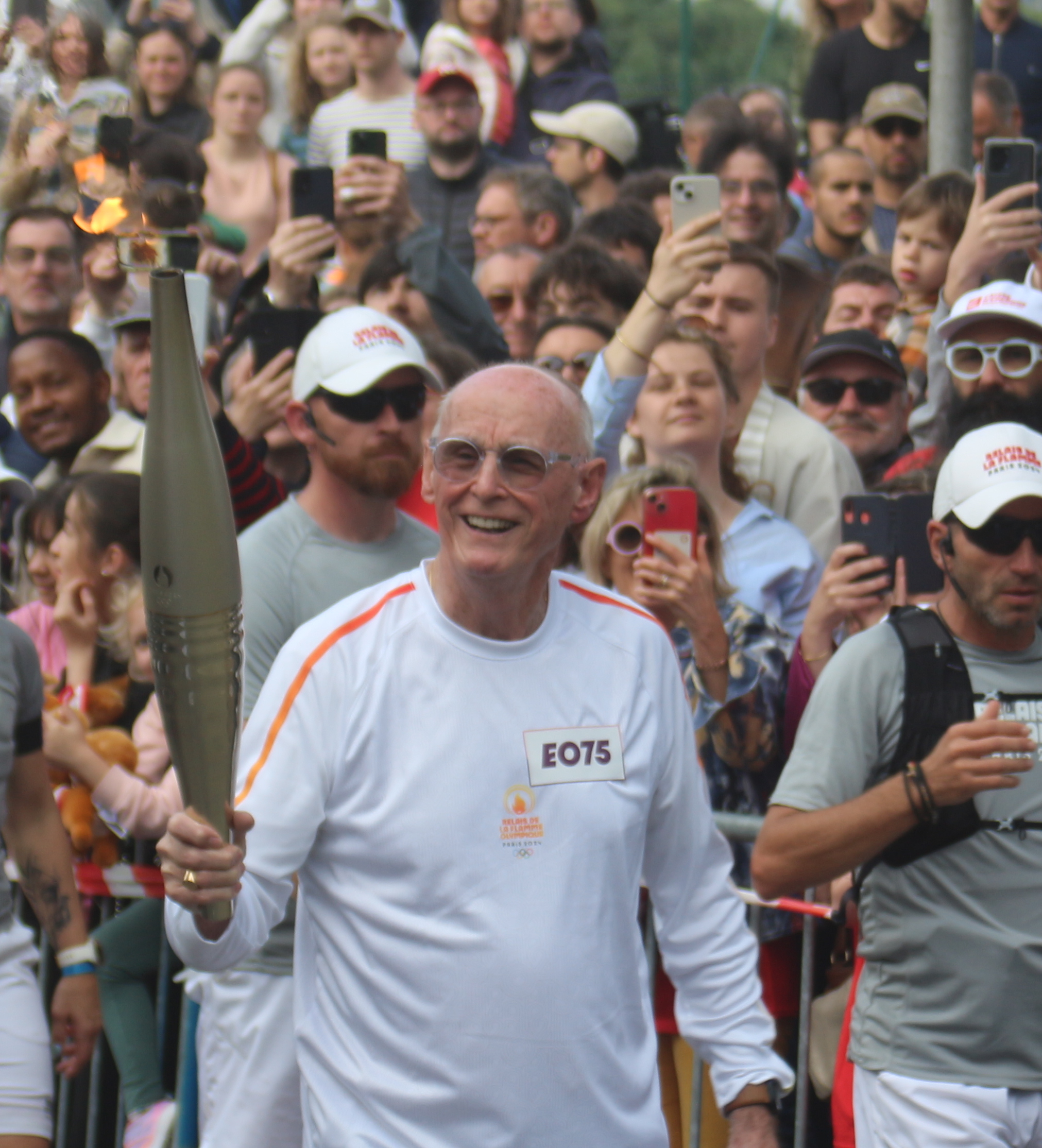
- Robert Poirier in the middle with olympic torch

Personal information
- Nationality: French
- Born: 16 June 1942 (age 84) Rennes, France

Sport
- Sport: Track and field
- Event: 400 metres hurdles
Medal record
Men's athletics
Representing France
European Championships
Bronze medal – third place	1966 Budapest	400 m hurdles
Mediterranean Games
Bronze medal – third place	1963 Naples	400m hurdles
Summer Universiade
Silver medal – second place	1965 Budapest	400m hurdles

Robert Poirier (born 16 June 1942) is a French hurdler. He competed in the 400 metres hurdles at the 1964 Summer Olympics and the 1968 Summer Olympics.
