= Gerhard Hennige =

German sprinter and hurdler (born 1940)

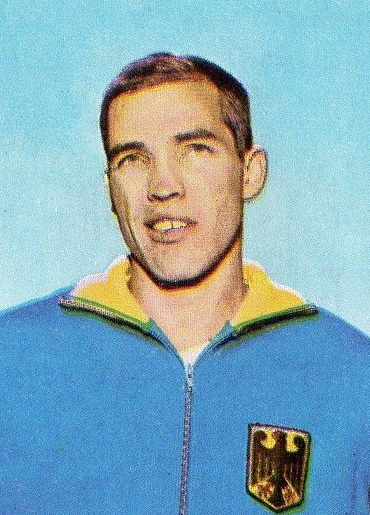
- Gerhard Hennige at the 1968 Olympics

Personal information
- Born: 23 September 1940 (age 85) Karlsruhe, Germany
- Height: 1.89 m (6 ft 2 in)
- Weight: 81 kg (179 lb)

Sport
- Sport: Athletics
- Events: 400 m, 400 m hurdles
- Club: Bayer Leverkusen

Achievements and titles
- Personal bests: 400 m – 46.5 (1968); 400 mH – 49.02 (1968)
Medal record
Men's athletics
Representing West Germany
Olympic Games
Silver medal – second place	1968 Mexico City	400 m hurdles
Bronze medal – third place	1968 Mexico City	4×400 m
European Championships
Bronze medal – third place	1969 Athens	4×400 m

Gerhard Hennige (born 23 September 1940) is a retired German sprinter. He won a silver medal in the 400 m hurdles at the 1968 Olympics, setting a European record in the semifinals. He was also part of the 4 × 400 m West German teams that finished third at the 1968 Olympics and 1969 European Championships. In 1967 he won the European Cup in the 400 m hurdles, and in 1968 he was awarded the Silbernes Lorbeerblatt.

Hennige was known for wearing very dark sunglasses while competing. In retirement he became a full-time teacher at the Technical University of Darmstadt. In 1997 he was the conditioning coach for Formula One racer Michael Schumacher. His daughter Christine competed nationally as a middle-distance runner.
