= Wilfried Geeroms =

Belgian hurdler

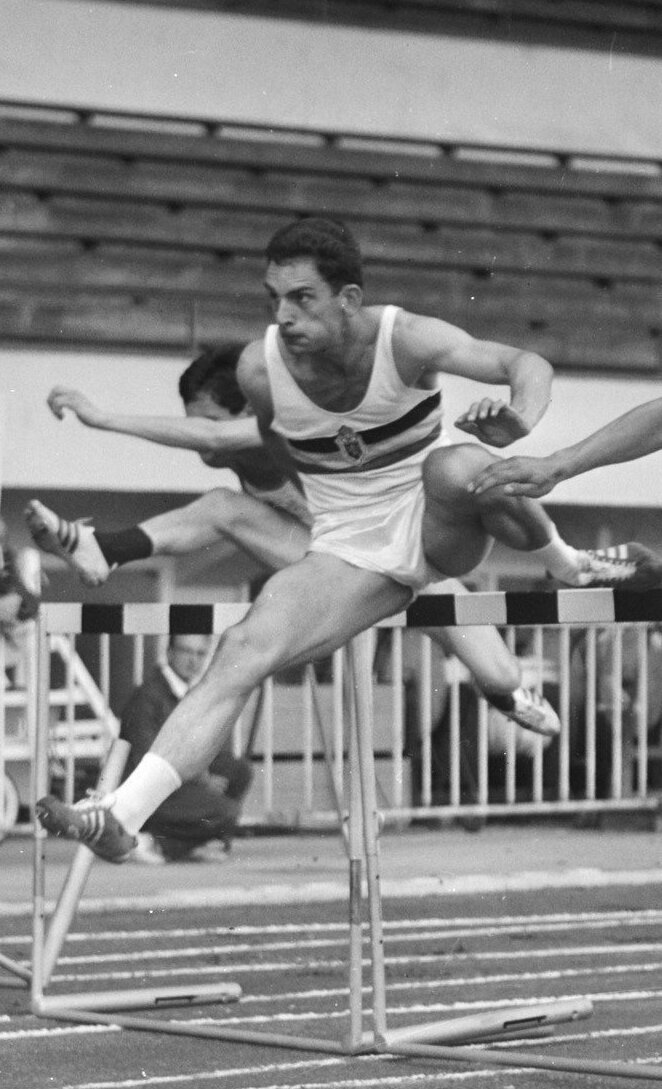
- Geeroms in 1966

Personal information
- Nationality: Belgian
- Born: 14 July 1941 Schaerbeek, Belgium
- Died: 4 May 1999 (aged 57) Jette, Belgium

Sport
- Sport: Track and field
- Event: 400 metres hurdles

Wilfried Geeroms (14 July 1941 – 4 May 1999) was a Belgian hurdler. He competed in the 400 metres hurdles at the 1964 Summer Olympics and the 1968 Summer Olympics.
