= Rainer Schubert =

German hurdler

Personal information
- Nationality: German
- Born: 12 October 1941 Dresden, West Germany
- Died: 13 August 2014 (aged 72) Bad Kreuznach, Germany

Sport
- Sport: Track and field
- Event: 400 metres hurdles

Rainer Schubert (12 October 1941 – 13 August 2014) was a German hurdler. He competed in the 400 metres hurdles at the 1968 Summer Olympics and the 1972 Summer Olympics, representing West Germany.
