= Kiyoo Yui =

Japanese hurdler (born 1943)

Personal information
- Born: 21 April 1943 (age 83) Miyagi Prefecture, Japan

Sport
- Sport: Track and field
Medal record
Representing Japan
Asian Games
Gold medal – first place	1966 Bangkok	400m hurdles
Gold medal – first place	1966 Bangkok	4x400m relay
Summer Universiade
Bronze medal – third place	1967 Tokyo	400m hurdles

Kiyoo Yui (油井 潔雄, Yui Kiyoo; born 21 April 1943) is a Japanese former hurdler who competed in the 1964 Summer Olympics and in the 1968 Summer Olympics.
