= Ron Whitney =

American hurdler and sprinter (born 1942)

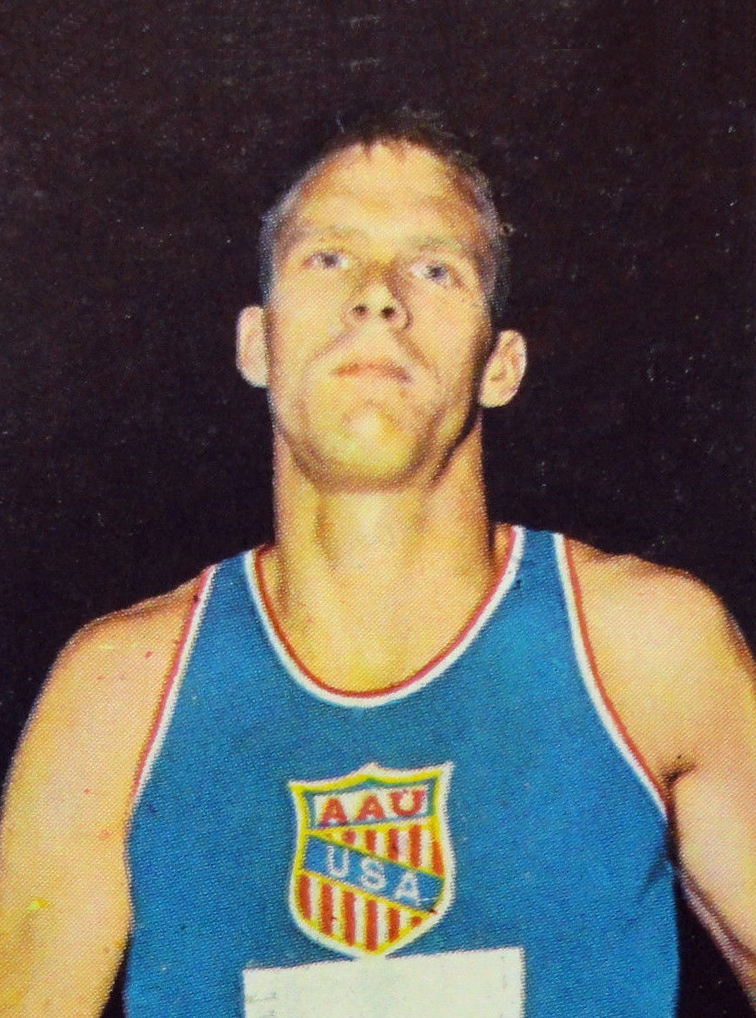

Personal information
- Born: October 5, 1942 (age 83) Modesto, California, United States
- Height: 1.87 m (6 ft 2 in)
- Weight: 78 kg (172 lb)

Sport
- Sport: Athletics
- Event(s): 400 m, 400 m hurdles
- Club: Southern California Striders, Anaheim

Achievements and titles
- Personal best(s): 400 m – 46.6 (1967); 880 yd – 1:48.6 (1963); 400 mH – 49.06 (1968)
Medal record
Representing the United States
Pan American Games
Gold medal – first place	1967 Winnipeg	400 m hurdles
Summer Universiade
Gold medal – first place	1967 Tokyo	400 m hurdles
Bronze medal – third place	1965 Budapest	400 m hurdles

Ronald Howard Whitney (born October 5, 1942) is an American retired hurdler and sprinter. Known for his fast finish, he was sixth in the 400 m hurdles at the 1968 Summer Olympics. He had entered the race as one of the favorites, having been ranked #1 in the world in 1967 and winning the USA Outdoor Track and Field Championships in the event for the second time earlier that year. At the Olympics, his first heat victory established a new Olympic record, only to be surpassed by David Hemery two days later.

Previously he had been the Pan American Games champion in the same event. While working on his master's degree at Colorado State University, he was the 1967 Gold Medalist at the World University Games. He also had won bronze two years earlier and while competing for Occidental College, where he was coached by Jim Bush, was runner up at the NCAA Championships in 1963.

At Thomas Downey High School in Modesto, California, Whitney was the champion at the 1960 Golden West Invitational, the equivalent of a national champion, at 800 m, a week after finishing fourth in the CIF California State Meet in the same event.

Whitney continued to compete into masters age groups as a pioneer of masters athletics.

Whitney continues to be involved in the sport as head track and field coach at Santa Rosa Junior College. He is a member of the Mt. SAC Relays Hall of Fame and the Occidental College Hall of Fame.
