= Monégasque Athletics Federation =

Sports governing body in Monaco

- Fédération Monégasque d'Athlétisme
- Sport: Athletics
- Abbreviation: FMA
- Founded: 1984
- Affiliation: World Athletics
- Regional affiliation: EAA and AASSE
- Headquarters: Monaco
- President: Albert II of Monaco
- Secretary: Anthony Desevelinges

Official website
- www.fma.mc
- (Monaco)

The Monégasque Athletics Federation (French: Fédération Monégasque d'Athlétisme) is the governing body for the sport of athletics in Monaco.

== Affiliations ==
- World Athletics
- European Athletic Association (EAA)
- Comité Olympique Monégasque

== National records ==
FMA maintains the Monégasque records in athletics.
