= List of winners of the Sydney Marathon =

The Sydney Marathon has been held annually since 2001, except in 2020 and 2021 when it was not held due to the COVID-19 pandemic. Starting with the 2025 edition of the race, the Sydney Marathon is part of the World Marathon Majors, along with the marathons of Berlin, Boston, Chicago, London, New York City, and Tokyo.

== Winners ==
Key: Course record

Year	Athlete	Nationality	Time	Athlete	Nationality	Time
Year	Male			Female		
2026	Addisu Gobena	Ethiopia	2:04:42	Peres Jepchirchir	Kenya	2:18:31
2025	Hailemaryam Kiros	Ethiopia	2:06:06	Sifan Hassan	Netherlands	2:18:22
2024	Brimin Kipkorir	Kenya	2:06:18	Workenesh Edesa	Ethiopia	2:21:41
2023	Othmane El Goumri	Morocco	2:08:20	Betsy Saina	USA	2:26:46
2022	Moses Kibet	Kenya	2:07:03	Tigist Girma Getachew	Ethiopia	2:25:10
2021	cancelled due to coronavirus pandemic					
2020	cancelled due to coronavirus pandemic					
2019	Felix Kiprotich	Kenya	2:09:49	Stella Barsosio	Kenya	2:24:33
2018	Elijah Kemboi	Kenya	2:13:37	Mercy Kibarus	Kenya	2:31:24
2017	Shota Hattori	Japan	2:15:16	Makda Harun	Ethiopia	2:28:02
2016	Tomohiro Tanigawa	Japan	2:12:11	Makda Harun	Ethiopia	2:32:22
2015	Hisanori Kitajima	Japan	2:12:44	Meriem Wangari	Kenya	2:34:38
2014	Gebo Burka	Ethiopia	2:11:18	Biruktayit Degefa	Ethiopia	2:29:42
2013	Willy Koitile	Kenya	2:13:48	Biruktayit Degefa	Ethiopia	2:32:46
2012	Yuki Kawauchi	Japan	2:11:52	Mitsuko Hirose	Japan	2:48:49
2011	Joel Kemboi	Kenya	2:17:31	Letay Negash	Ethiopia	2:43:22
2010	Issac Serem	Kenya	2:25:17	Helen Stanton	Australia	2:49:58
2009	Julius Seurei	Kenya	2:17:07	Naoko Tsuchiya	Japan	2:52:46
2008	Julius Maritim	Kenya	2:19:01	Lisa Flint	Australia	2:47:43
2007	Julius Maritim	Kenya	2:14:38	Naoko Tsuchiya	Japan	2:43:10
2006	Julius Maritim	Kenya	2:19:51	Naoko Tsuchiya	Japan	2:48:44
2005	Julius Maritim	Kenya	2:21:47	Ruth Kingston	New Zealand	2:53:56
2004	Oswald Revelian	Tanzania	2:21:13	Rina Hill	Australia	2:39:46
2003	Oswald Revelian	Tanzania	2:26:01	Tausi Juma	Ethiopia	2:46:23
2002	Stephen Bwiret	Kenya	2:17:30	Heather Turland	Australia	2:51:06
2001	Damon Harris	New Zealand	2:25:49	Krishna Stanton	Australia	2:38:11

=== Multiple wins ===
Men's
Athlete	Wins	Years
Julius Maritim (KEN)	4	2005, 2006, 2007, 2008
Oswald Revelian (TAN)	2	2003, 2004

Women's
Athlete	Wins	Years
Naoko Tsuchiya (JPN)	3	2006, 2007, 2009
Biruktayit Degefa (ETH)	2	2013, 2014
Makda Harun (ETH)	2	2016, 2017

=== By country ===
Country	Total	Men's	Women's
Kenya	17	13	4
Ethiopia	10	2	8
Japan	8	4	4
Australia	5	0	5
New Zealand	2	1	1
Tanzania	2	2	0
Netherlands	1	0	1
