= 1978 Chicago Marathon =

American marathon

2nd Chicago Marathon
- Venue: Chicago, United States
- Dates: September 24
- Competitors: 4053

Champions
- Men: Mark Stanforth (2:19:20)
- Women: Lynae Larson (2:59:25)

The 1978 Chicago Marathon (also known as the Mayor Daley Marathon) was the second running of the annual marathon race in Chicago, United States and was held on September 24. The elite men's and women's races were won by Americans Mark Stanforth (2:19:20) and Lynae Larson (2:59:25). The race was run in temperatures at times above 80 °F (27 °C), which caused hundreds of competitors to need medical attention.

== Background ==
The entry for the 1978 race was increased from $5 the previous year to $10, making it the most expensive US marathon race to enter at the time. The money covered the race organizer's cost of between $200,000 and $250,000 for the race. He had lost $65,000 from the 1977 event. The winners received no prize money, which was not introduced until 1982.

The start time for the race was 10:30 am, which was 2.5 hours later than the previous year; originally, the proposed start time had been noon, but this was changed after consultation with competitors and the Chicago Area Runners Association. Reasons given for the change included so that more out-of-town competitors could attend, and so to attract more spectators. Many competitors objected to this change, citing issues with the potential for high temperatures, and the medical doctor from the 1977 event also criticized the decision to change the start time. Some competitors wore black armbands to protest the decision.

== Race summary ==
The race was run in a peak temperature of over 80 °F (27 °C), and as a result, hundreds of competitors needed medical attention, and 10 people were hospitalized. Chicago mayor Michael Anthony Bilandic blamed the lack of fitness of competitors for the health issues. It was estimated that between 9,000 and 10,000 people started the race; the youngest starter was eight years old, and the oldest starters were around 70 years old. Anyone was able to sign up for the event, unlike in the Boston Marathon where competitors had to have previously achieved a qualifying time. The race had two start lines, which allowed competitors to spread out more easily. A total of 4053 runners finished the race, a near doubling from the previous year.

In the men's race, 1977 winner Dan Cloeter led from the start of the race, ahead of a pack of leading racers. Mark Stanforth caught that group, as they were struggling with the heat more than him, and then caught and passed Cloeter at around the 20 miles (32 km) mark. Cloeter fell behind from Stanforth as he was suffering from cramp in his legs. Stanforth suffered with blisters on his feet in the last few miles, but nevertheless won the race in a time of 2:19:20. He finished over five minutes ahead of Barney Klecker, who finished second, and Cloeter finished third, five seconds behind Klecker. After the race, Stanforth said that the course was too slow, as it had too many corners and too many changes of terrain.

The women's race was won by Lynae Larson, a schoolteacher in Brookings, South Dakota, in a time of 2:59:25. After the race, Larson complained that the delayed start time affected her travel home, as she had to drive six hours back to Brookings to work the next day.

== Results ==
=== Men ===
Top 10 Men's finishers
Position	Athlete	Nationality	Time
1st place, gold medalist(s)	Mark Stanforth	United States	2:19:20
2nd place, silver medalist(s)	Barney Klecker	United States	2:24:13
3rd place, bronze medalist(s)	Dan Cloeter	United States	2:24:33
4	Blair Bertaccini	United States	2:26:31
5	Dean Reinke	United States	2:26:55
6	Pat Chmiel	United States	2:27:22
7	Les Myers	United States	2:29:39
8	Robert Brown	United States	2:30:08
9	Thomas Blumer	United States	2:30:08
10	John Been	United States	2:30:33

=== Women ===
Top 10 Women's finishers
Position	Athlete	Nationality	Time
1st place, gold medalist(s)	Lynae Larson	United States	2:59:25
2nd place, silver medalist(s)	Karen Doppes	United States	3:13:20
3rd place, bronze medalist(s)	Debbie Hartsock	United States	3:13:25
4	Marion Burchfield	United States	3:20:00
5	Martha McCafferty	United States	3:22:45
6	Susan Grossman	United States	3:25:00
7	Mary Logan	United States	3:26:00
8	Samatha Danner	United States	3:28:35
9	Lydi Pallares	United States	3:29:35
10	Sonja Liems	United States	3:29:55
