= Mark Stanforth =

American marathon runner and coach

Personal information
- Born: December 24, 1949 (age 76)

Sport
- Sport: Athletics

Achievements and titles
- Personal best: 2:17:14
Medal record
Marathon
World Marathon Majors
Representing United States
Gold medal – first place	1978 Chicago	Marathon

Mark Stanforth is an American former marathon runner and coach, who won the 1978 Chicago Marathon. He failed to qualify for the 1976 and 1980 Summer Olympics.

== Early life, education and army service ==
Stanforth studied at South Dakota State University, before transferring to the University of South Dakota–Springfield, graduating in 1972. At USD-Springfield, he participated in cross country running and basketball, and was twice the college's athlete of the year. After graduating, he joined the United States Army and became a finance specialist with the 25th Infantry Division at Schofield Barracks, Hawaii. He later worked in a bank in Phoenix. From January 1976 to August 1977, he attended Northern State University in Aberdeen, South Dakota and received a master's degree in physical education.

== Running career ==
Stanforth ran his first marathon in 1973. While in the Army, he ran the 1974 Boston Marathon, finishing 75th. He competed in the 1975 Honolulu Marathon, where he missed the 1976 Summer Olympics qualification time by 31 seconds. The same year, he won a King Kamehameha I Day 4.5 miles (7.2 km) kukini race in Hawaii, and set a course record in a 6 miles (9.7 km) race at Cooke Field, the stadium of the University of Hawaiʻi at Mānoa.

In 1978, Stanforth moved to Phoenix, Arizona to attempt to qualify for the 1980 Summer Olympics. He won the 1978 Chicago Marathon (also known as the Mayor Daley Marathon) in a time of 2:19:20. The race was run in a peak temperature of over 80 °F (27 °C), and Stanforth caught the leaders around 20 miles (32 km) into the race as they were struggling with the heat more than him. He then passed 1977 winner Dan Cloeter, and won the race by over five minutes. He ran the last few miles with blisters on his feet. It was Stanforth's sixth competitive marathon event, and his third victory. Later in the year, he came second at the Phoenix Marathon in a personal best time of 2:17:14. Stanforth was in the leading group of three runners, before Arizonan Walter Johnson broke away 20 miles (32 km) into the race. Stanforth finished over a minute behind Johnson.

Stanforth was invited to the 1979 Chicago Marathon, but did not compete due to an injury. He competed in the US Marathon Trial Event for selected for the 1980 Summer Olympics. During the race, he became dehydrated, and eventually finished 124th out of 125 competitors. In 1981, he won a 10,000 metres race in Burke, South Dakota.

== Coaching career ==
In 1977, Stanforth became a coach at USD-Springfield; he quit the role when he moved to Phoenix. He later worked as a coach at Glendale Community College in Arizona. As of 2002, he was a coach of the United States Air Force Academy athletics team. He was the head coach of cross country and the assistant coach of track & field (responsible for Distance Runners) at the United States Air Force Academy. He was a four-time winner of the Conference Coach of the Year in Cross Country Award for the Western Athletic Conference and Mountain West Conference.
