= Virginia 10 Miler =

Historic US ten-mile race

Coordinates: 37°24′32.44″N 79°9′56.20″W

- Date: September
- Location: Lynchburg, Virginia, U.S.
- Event type: Road
- Distance: 10 miles (16 km)
- Established: 1974
- Website: virginia10miler.com

The Virginia 10 Miler is a historic 10 mile road race held annually in Lynchburg, Virginia. First run in 1974, it is one of the oldest 10 milers in the U.S. The race has hosted some of the best distance runners in the world, including Rod Dixon (course record holder with 46:50 in 1981), U.S. marathon champion Bill Rodgers, Olympic Gold medal winners Frank Shorter, Joan Benoit Samuelson, and Lasse Viren, and Olympic Silver medal winner Grete Waitz (course record holder with 53:05 in 1979). It continues to attract elite national and international runners.

The race event also includes a four mile race and walk, as well as "Amazing Mile" Kids Races the day before in downtown Lynchburg. The race is typically held at the end of September. Since 2021 the race has been called the Moore and Giles Virginia 10 Miler. The most recent race was held on Saturday, September 26, 2026.

== History ==
The idea for the Virginia 10 Miler came in 1973 from a Lynchburg engineer and runner named Rudy Straub. Straub and some friends, who were part of the Lynchburg Area Track Club, wanted to create a long-distance road race that would encourage running in the community, and draw top athletes to Lynchburg. For that purpose they created a new club called the Lynchburg Road Runners, and with the support of First Colony Life Insurance Company, put on the first race in September, 1974. The total budget for the event was $550, with no prize money. The race, won by John Vitale in 49:14, had 225 starters, and included several national-level middle-distance runners, two of whom had been Olympic competitors, Marty Liquori and Jeff Galloway.

The following year, Straub, as race director, was able to entice two nationally-known runners, Bill Rodgers and Frank Shorter, to compete by offering them $500 each (unofficially, a common practice of the time). Rodgers, a top marathoner who would go on to win the Boston Marathon and the New York City Marathon four times each, drove down from Boston in his VW. Shorter had won the Gold medal in the marathon at the 1972 Summer Olympics three years before, and was one of America's most famous runners. The number of entrants in the race almost doubled, and Rodgers and Shorter crossed the finish line together, in a time of 48:17. Straub's unique marketing ideas, the nascent boom of road racing in the 1970s, and the presence of elite athletes flagged the race as a premier event that drew other top runners. The following year, 1976, Rodgers won again, with a time 0f 47:48, and Julie Shea of North Carolina broke the one-hour mark for the first time for women runners, with a time of 57:57.

Over the next decade the race continued to grow in number of participants and national recognition. In 1979, Norwegian Grete Waitz, who would go on to win a Gold medal in the marathon at the 1983 World Championships, and a Silver medal at the 1984 Olympics, took almost four minutes off the previous fastest women's time, with 53:05, a course record which still stands. Two years later New Zealander Rod Dixon, a Bronze medalist in the 1500 at the 1972 Olympics, ran the course in 46:50, also still the course record. In 1981, ESPN, then a new sports network, gave the race further publicity by having a reporter cover the race by running it with a helmet-mounted camera.

In 1986 the number of participants reached a high point, with more than 2,600 completing the race. Four-time Olympian Australian Rob de Castella won with a time of 47:49, after having missed Dixon's record by two seconds the previous year. New Zealander Anne Audain won the women's division with a time of 55:02, the fourth of her six wins.

In 1996, for the first and only time, the race winners were a married couple, Mark Coogan (50:55) and Gwyn Coogan (1:00:41), who had also been the first married couple to compete in the U.S. Olympic marathon trials earlier in the year.

Participation in the 10 Miler decreased from its peak in the 1980s and by the mid-2000s hit a "slump." By 2004-2006 the number of runners for the 10 Miler had dwindled to barely 500, and the winning time in 2005 was 10 minutes slower than it had been in the 1980s.

By 2009 however, participation and times began to improve, in part due to incentivizing elite runners to return, as well as returned stewardship of the race to the Lynchburg Road Runners Club. In 2007 the total prize money pool had been $650; by 2013 in had increased to $14,400. In 2013, the number of finishers in the 10 Miler had increased to 1,500, with winning times under 48 minutes again.

Other developments in the history of the race include:

- 1999: A separate four mile race was added to the event. In 2021 the four mile course was modified and extended, and is now referred to as the "4+ Miler."
- 2001: The initiation of children's races and other family-friendly activities, organized by the Amazement Square children's museum in downtown Lynchburg.. In 2026 the "Amazing Mile" Children's Run completed its 25th year.
- 2001: The initiation of a color guard run as part of the 10 mile race, originated by Marine Corps veteran Steve Bozeman after the September 11, 2001 attacks. A set of participants run the entire course carrying ceremonial flags in honor of veterans and the fallen. 2026 saw the 25th running of the color guard.
- 2010: Inception of the Virginia 4 Mile Walk.
- 2014: The Virginia 10 Miler was named the 2014 Road Race of the Year by the Road Runners Club of America. The award recognizes "events that are organized as nonprofit races that provide safe, well-designed, and enjoyable events that promote grassroots running and the mission of the RRCA.”
- 2020: Race was not held due to the COVID-19 pandemic.

In 2021 title sponsorship of the race was taken over by the Moore and Giles leather goods and furniture company. In 2026, there were more than 3,700 participants among all the events, including 1,427 finishers in the 10 Mile race.

== Course ==
External image
- Course map
- The Virginia 10 Miler Course Map

The 10 Miler course is hilly and often described as challenging. The race is an out-and-back course, with a loop near the midpoint. The course starts at E.C. Glass High School and goes downhill for roughly the first mile and a half, dropping 200 ft (61 m) in elevation until reaching a low point at what is known as "The Farm Basket" (from a local farm produce store there). It then climbs a series of rolling hills along Langhorne Road until turning on Rivermont Avenue, passing Randolph College, then entering Riverside Park, where it makes a loop including a short, steep hill near the halfway point, then returns the same way. The last 1.5 miles from The Farm Basket are uphill. The course has not changed in its history.

Race entrants may compete as individuals or in corporate or open teams. The race organizers and top runners have noted that, because of its hilliness, the race is ideal training for marathons later in the fall, and the competitors who do well at Lynchburg typically do well in later races.

The race has been called "one of the few annual traditions that defines Lynchburg" and has attracted large numbers of spectators and community involvement.

== Past winners ==
Key: Course record
Source: 1974-1981 and 1997-present. 1982-1996.

Year	Men's winner	Time (m:s)	Women's winner	Time (m:s)
1974	John Vitale (USA)	49:14	Gail Hafley (USA)	1:07:45
1975*	Bill Rodgers, Frank Shorter (USA)	48:17	Deborah Snaggs (USA)	1:04:48
1976	Bill Rodgers (USA)	47:48	Julie Shea (USA)	57:57
1977	Bill Rodgers (USA)	48:14	Kim Merritt (USA)	58:11
1978	Bill Rodgers (USA)	48:33	Julie Shea (USA)	57:01
1979	Herb Lindsay (USA)	47:01	Grete Waitz (NOR)	53:05
1980	Rod Dixon (NZ)	46:51	Jacqueline Gareau (CAN)	55:41
1981	Rod Dixon (NZ)	46:50	Anne Audain (NZ)	53:54
1982	Jon Sinclair (USA)	47:34	Maureen Roben (USA)	56:19
1983	Rod Dixon (NZ)	47:12	Jacqueline Gareau (CAN)	54:41
1984	Gabriel Kamau (KEN)	46:59	Anne Audain (NZ)	53:47
1985	Rob de Castella (AUS)	46:52	Anne Audain (NZ)	54:05
1986	Rob de Castella (AUS)	47:49	Anne Audain (NZ)	55:02
1987	Jon Sinclair (USA)	47:19	Anne Audain (NZ)	54:56
1988	Jon Sinclair (USA)	48:09	Anne Hannam (NZ)	54:40
1989	John Halvorsen (NOR)	47:54	Diane Brewer (USA)	55:52
1990	John Halvorsen (NOR)	47:40	Kellie Archuletta (USA)	55:27
1991	Jon Sinclair (USA)	48:19	Anne Audain (NZ)	55:28
1992	John Halvorsen (NOR)	48:22	Julie Burtner (USA)	1:06:39
1993	Jon Sinclair (USA)	50:14	Libbie Hickman (USA)	1:00:17
1994	Matt Richards (USA)	54:25	Leslie Minnix (USA)	1:02:09
1995	Martín Mondragón (MEX)	50:49	Elizabeth Andrews (USA)	1:03:28
1996	Mark Coogan (USA)	50:55	Gwyn Coogan (USA)	1:00:41
1997	Peter Githuka (KEN)	48:55	Valentina Yegorova (RUS)	58:17
1998	Daniel Kihara (KEN)	49:48	Joan Nesbit (USA)	58:07
1999	Peter Githuka (KEN)	47:12	Margaret Kagiri (KEN)	57:42
2000	Peter Githuka (KEN)	47:33	Catherine Ndereba (KEN)	55:03
2001	Patrick Nthiwa (KEN)	49:36	Tara P. Wojciechowski (USA)	1:00:09
2002	Ronald Mogaka (KEN)	48:42	Tara P. Wojciechowski (USA)	58:58
2003	Michael Mislay (TAN)	48:42	Naomi Wangui (KEN)	57:45
2004	Henry Githuka (KEN)	51:21	Tara P. Wojciechowski (USA)	59:04
2005	Pete O'Brien (USA)	57:51	Tara P. Wojciechowski (USA)	59:30
2006	Aaron Saft (USA)	56:54	Katie Stuckey (USA)	1:09:08
2007	David Cheromei (KEN)	52:26	Tara P. Wojciechowski (USA)	59:35
2008	David Cheromei (KEN)	50:16	Joan Benoit Samuelson (USA)	1:02:25
2009	Julius Kogo (KEN)	48:40	Helen Chemutai (KEN)	56:41
2010	Benson Cheruiyot (KEN)	49:24	Renee High (USA)	1:01:17
2011	Elkanah Kibet (USA)	49:47	Bekelech Bedada (ETH)	56:38
2012	Julius Kogo (KEN)	47:48	Helen Chemutai (KEN)	55:51
2013	Julius Kogo (KEN)	47:34	Jane Murage (KEN)	55:38
2014	Julius Kogo (KEN)	48:20	Lilian Mariita (KEN)	54:45
2015	Kimutai Cheruiyot (KEN)	48:58	Susan Jerotich (KEN)	56:12
2016	Paul Sugut (KEN)	47:42	Joan Aiyabei (KEN)	56:47
2017	Benard Ngeno (KEN)	47:25	Biruktayit Degefa (ETH)	54:31
2018	Julius Kogo (KEN)	48:17	Vicoty Chepngeno (KEN)	54:53
2019	Raymond Magut (KEN)	47:28	Vicoty Chepngeno (KEN)	53:39
2021	Elkanah Kibet (USA)	48:24	Sarah Naibei (KEN)	55:56
2022	Melkamu Wube (ETH)	47:48	Monicah Ngige (KEN)	53:16
2023	Panuel Mkungo (KEN)	47:50	Sarah Naibei (KEN)	53:13
2024	Josephat Too (KEN)	48:47	Sarah Naibei (KEN)	54:58
2025	Athanas Kioko (KEN)	48:14	Werkuha Getachew (ETH)	54:53
2026	Sosten Kipchirchir (KEN)	48:13	Werkuha Getachew (ETH)	55:08

- 1975: Bill Rodgers and Frank Shorter crossed the finish line together

== Most wins, men ==
Source: 1974-1981 and 1997-present. 1982-1996.

Men	Number	Years
Jon Sinclair	5	1982, 1987, 1988, 1991, 1993
Bill Rodgers	4	1975, 1976, 1977, 1978
Julius Kogo	4	2009, 2012, 2013, 2014
Rod Dixon	3	1980, 1981, 1983
John Halvorsen	3	1989, 1990, 1992
Peter Githuka	3	1997, 1999, 2000

== Most wins, women ==
Women	Number	Years
Anne Audain	6	1981, 1984, 1985, 1986, 1987, 1991
Tara P. Wojciechowski	5	2001, 2002, 2004, 2005, 2007
Sarah Naibei	3	2021, 2023, 2024
