= Gebo Burka Gameda =

Ethiopian long-distance runner

Personal information
- Nationality: Ethiopian
- Born: Gebo Burka Gameda; August 28, 1987 (age 38) Ethiopia
- Occupation: Long-distance runner
- Years active: 2005–2016 (last recorded result: January 2016)

Sport
- Country: Ethiopia
- Sport: Athletics
- Event: Marathon

Achievements and titles
- Personal best(s): Marathon: 2:08:12 (Houston, 2015)

Gebo Burka Gameda (born 28 August 1987) is an Ethiopian former long-distance runner who specialized in the marathon. He is known for winning the 2014 Los Angeles Marathon and Sydney Marathon, and for being disqualified from the 2016 Houston Marathon following a doping violation.

== Career ==
Burka began his international running career in the mid-2000s and rose to prominence in the early 2010s. In 2014, he won both the Los Angeles and Sydney marathons.

At the 2015 Houston Marathon, he set his personal best of 2:08:12, finishing second.

== Doping suspension ==
In January 2016, Burka won the Houston Marathon in 2:10:55. However, in August that year, the United States Anti-Doping Agency (USADA) announced that he had tested positive for prednisone, a banned glucocorticoid, from a sample collected on race day.

He accepted an 18-month suspension, stating that the medication had been prescribed but used without a valid Therapeutic Use Exemption (TUE). All results from 17 January 2016 onward were annulled, including his Houston Marathon win. Third-place finisher Birhanu Gedefa was later declared the official winner.

== Personal bests ==
- Marathon: 2:08:12 – Houston, United States, 18 January 2015
- 5000 metres: 13:22.17 – Dessie, Ethiopia, 9 June 2005
- 10 km (road): 28:28 – Addis Ababa, Ethiopia, 11 June 2005
