= Tebello Ramakongoana =

Lesotho athlete (born 1996)

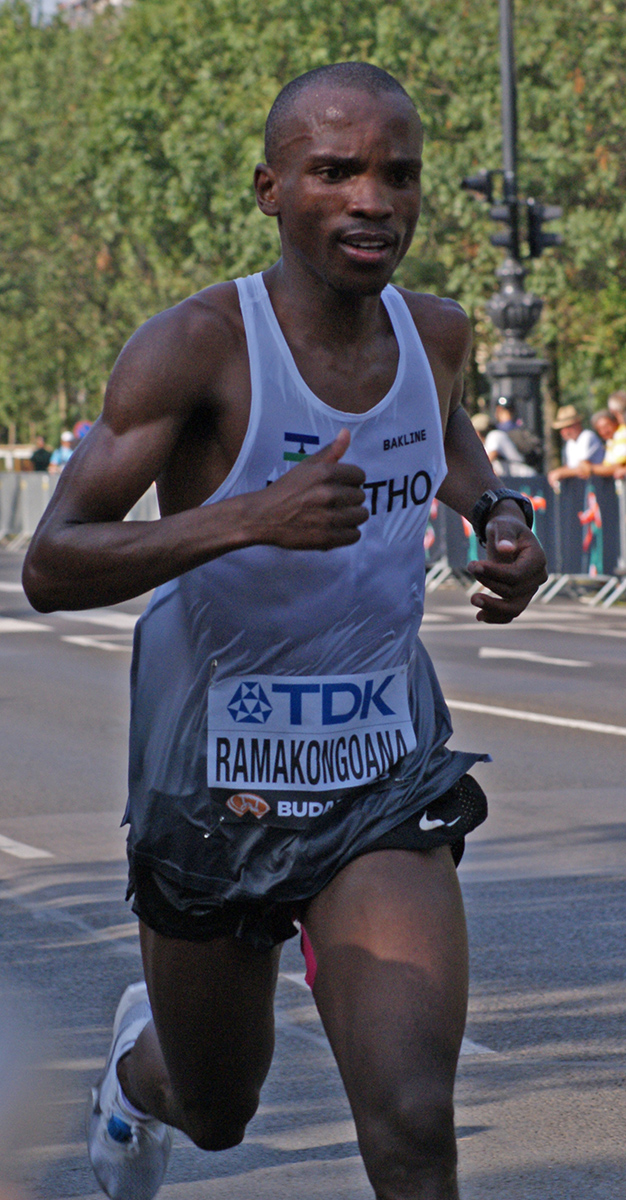
- Ramakongoana in 2023

Personal information
- Born: 13 October 1996 (age 30) Mohlapiso, Maseepho Community Council, Qacha's Nek, Lesotho

Sport
- Sport: Athletics
- Event: Marathon
- Coached by: James McKirdy (McKirdy Trained)

Achievements and titles
- Personal bests: 5000 m: 13:58 (BAA 5K, 2024) NR; Half marathon: 1:00:17 (Gary Bjorkland Half, 2024) NR; 25 km: 1:11:59 (Tata Steel Kolkata 25K, 2025 NR; Marathon: 2:04:57 (Sydney, 2026) NR; Marathon: 2:04:18 (Boston, 2026)*
Medal record
Men's athletics
Representing Lesotho
World Marathon Majors
Bronze medal – third place	2025 Sydney	Marathon
Bronze medal – third place	2026 Sydney	Marathon

Tebello Ramakongoana (born 13 October 1996) is a long-distance runner from Lesotho. He was fourth in the marathon at the 2023 World Athletics Championships and seventh in the marathon at the 2024 Olympic Games.

== Biography ==
Ramakongoana comes from Mohlapiso, Maseepho in the Qacha's Nek District of Lesotho.

Ramakongoana competed in 2023 with a Lesotho National Olympics Committee (LNOC) athletics scholarship. In March 2023, he won the Durban Marathon. In 2023, he also set a new Lesotho national half Marathon record with a run of 1:00:35 at the Nelson Mandela Bay Half Marathon in Gqeberha.

Ramakongoana finished in fourth place in the marathon at the 2023 World Athletics Championships in Budapest in a personal best time of 2:09:57.

In February 2024, he set a new national record time of 2:08:09 at the Osaka Marathon. He won the Lilac Bloomsday Run in Spokane, Washington in May 2024.

In the men's marathon at the Olympic Games in Paris in 2024, Ramakongoana finished in seventh place with a new national record time of 2:07:58. He improved that national record to 2:06:18 at the Xiamen Marathon in January 2025.

In August 2025, Ramakongoana earned his first podium finish at a World Major Marathon, placing 3rd at the 2025 Sydney Marathon in a time of 2:06:47.

In April 2026, he ran a new marathon distance fastest time with 2:04:18 for a sixth place finish at the 2026 Boston Marathon. Ramakongoana went on to earn another bronze medal at a World Major Marathon in the 2026 Sydney Marathon in August, outkicking Alphonce Simbu to the finish in a time of 2:04:57.

Olympic Games
Preceded by None	Flagbearer for Lesotho; 2024 Paris	Succeeded by Incumbent
