= 2025 Sydney Marathon =

26.2 mi (42.195 km) race held in Sydney Australia

25th Sydney Marathon
- Location: Sydney, Australia
- Dates: August 31, 2025 (13 months ago)
- Website: tcssydneymarathon.com

Champions
- Men: Hailemaryam Kiros (2:06:06 CR)
- Women: Sifan Hassan (2:18:22 CR)
- Wheelchair men: Marcel Hug (1:27:15)
- Wheelchair women: Susannah Scaroni (1:44:52)

The 2025 Sydney Marathon was the 25th edition of the event, and notably the first running since the race was announced as the seventh addition to the World Marathon Majors in November 2024.

The race had 79,000 applications in 2025. The number of finishers was nearly 33,000 runners. This was a notable increase from the 2022 edition of the Sydney Marathon where 5,306 runners entered the race.

== Background ==
The Sydney Marathon began as a race following the 2000 Sydney Olympics and typically took place on the second week of September. When the race was announced as the seventh World Marathon Major, the date was moved to the end of August.

Notable hilly climbs along the course, including Sydney's Oxford Street make for physically challenging conditions. The weather for the race typically is slightly warm adding to the challenging conditions, however the usual light winds are favorable for runners.

== Results ==
The Sydney Marathon began on August 31 at 6:30am local time.

=== Men ===
Elite men's top 10 finishers
Position	Athlete	Nationality	Time
1st place, gold medalist(s)	Hailemaryam Kiros	Ethiopia	2:06:06 CR
2nd place, silver medalist(s)	Addisu Gobena	Ethiopia	2:06:16
3rd place, bronze medalist(s)	Tebello Ramakongoana	Lesotho	2:06:47
4	Mustapha Houdadi	Morocco	2:07:17
5	Edward Cheserek	Kenya	2:07:38
6	Arao Masato	Japan	2:07:42
7	Laban Korir	Kenya	2:08:06
8	Felix Kiptoo	Kenya	2:08:18
9	Eliud Kipchoge	Kenya	2:08:31
10	Victor Kipchirchir	Kenya	2:09:01

=== Women ===
Elite women's top 10 finishers
Position	Athlete	Nationality	Time
1st place, gold medalist(s)	Sifan Hassan	Netherlands	2:18:22 CR
2nd place, silver medalist(s)	Brigid Kosgei	Kenya	2:18:56
3rd place, bronze medalist(s)	Workenesh Edesa	Ethiopia	2:22:15
4	Kumeshi Sichala	Ethiopia	2:22:50
5	Evaline Chirchir	Kenya	2:23:13
6	Hosoda Ai	Japan	2:23:27
7	Leanne Pompeani	Australia	2:24:47
8	Jessica Stenson	Australia	2:28:56
9	Lisa Weightman	Australia	2:29:34
10	Abigail Nordberg	Australia	2:35:43
