= Buzunesh Gudeta =

Ethiopian long-distance runner (born 1997)

Personal information
- Nationality: Ethiopian
- Born: Buzunesh Getachew Gudeta; April 18, 1997 (age 29) Ethiopia
- Occupation: Long-distance runner
- Years active: 2019–present

Sport
- Country: Ethiopia
- Sport: Athletics
- Event(s): Marathon, Half marathon, 10 km road race

Achievements and titles
- Personal bests: Marathon: 2:19:27 (Frankfurt, 2023); Half marathon: 1:09:51 (Tel Aviv, 2022); 10 kilometres road: 31:43 (Ad-Dawhah, 2019)

Buzunesh Gudeta (born 18 April 1997), also known as Buzunesh Getachew Gudeta, is an Ethiopian long-distance runner who specializes in the marathon and half marathon. She rose to prominence after winning the 2023 Frankfurt Marathon with a personal best of 2:19:27.

== Career ==
Buzunesh Gudeta began competing in road running events in 2019. That year, she set a personal best of 31:43 in the 10 km road race held in Ad-Dawhah.

In February 2022, she achieved a new personal best in the half marathon, clocking 1:09:51 at the Tel Aviv Half Marathon.

Her breakthrough came in October 2023, when she won the Frankfurt Marathon with a personal best of 2:19:27—the second-fastest women’s time in the event’s history.

In 2024, Gudeta competed at the Sydney Marathon in September, finishing with a time of 3:03:34. She began 2025 with two marathon appearances: 2:31:47 at the Xiamen Marathon in January and 2:28:53 at the Standard Chartered Hong Kong Marathon in February.

== Personal bests ==
- Marathon: 2:19:27 – Frankfurt, 2023
- Half marathon: 1:09:51 – Tel Aviv, 2022
- 10 kilometres road: 31:43 – Ad-Dawhah, 2019

== Major results ==
Year	Competition	Location	Position	Time
2023	Frankfurt Marathon	Frankfurt, Germany	1st	2:19:27
2024	Sydney Marathon	Sydney, Australia	—	3:03:34
2025	Xiamen Marathon	Xiamen, China	12th	2:31:47
2025	Standard Chartered Hong Kong Marathon	Hong Kong, China	4th	2:28:53
