= Lynae Larson =

American marathon runner

Personal information
- Born: 1953 (age 72–73)

Sport
- Sport: Athletics
Medal record
Marathon
World Marathon Majors
Representing United States
Gold medal – first place	1978 Chicago	Marathon
Silver medal – second place	1979 Chicago	Marathon

Lynae Larson (born 1953) is an American former marathon runner, who won the 1978 Chicago Marathon, and finished second in the 1979 Chicago Marathon. She failed to qualify for the 1976 Summer Olympics.

== Personal life and early career ==
Larson was born in 1953 and studied at Dickinson State College, where she began running. In her sophomore year, Larson set four meeting records at the North Dakota Association for Intercollegiate Athletics for Women event. She set records in the 440-yard run, long jump, 200-meter low hurdles, and the 880-yard run. In 1975, Larson won the long jump, 50 metres hurdles, 880-yard run and 1-mile run events at the same competition, and set a meeting record in the mile run. From 1976 to 1977, Larson was the coach of the Dickinson State girls' track and field team. The following year, Larson was a high school gym teacher in Brookings, South Dakota. In 2002, Larson worked as a schoolteacher in Saint Paul, Minnesota. She also worked as Women's Athletics Director at Dickinson State College.

== Career ==
Larson failed to qualify for the marathon event at the 1976 Summer Olympics, after withdrawing 15 miles (24 km) into the qualification event due to an injury.

Larson won the 1978 Chicago Marathon, in a time of 2:59:25. She received no prize money, as the event only began awarding prize money in 1982. After the race, other runners were complaining about the 10:30 start, which had most runners finishing in 80 °F (27 °C) heat, but Larson instead was concerned that the delayed start time affected her travel home, as she had to drive six hours back to Brookings, South Dakota, to work the next day. A race sponsor said the start time had been chosen to accommodate all entrants who lived outside the city.

Larson competed at the 1979 Chicago Marathon, and was leading until around 1 mile (1.6 km) from the finish line, when she was overtaken by 15-year-old Laura Michalek. Larson eventually finished around a minute behind Michalek, in second place. In the same year, Larson won the second ever Lincoln Marathon, taking 31 minutes off the winning time from the previous year.

In 1984, Larson won the Kaypro Super Run in Las Vegas. The event was only for amateur athletes, one from each of the 50 states of the US. Larson qualified as amateur as she had not competed at the Olympics. The promised prize money was $500,000, awarded as $10,000 per year for 50 years. However Larson only received $40,000 as the sponsor went bust four years later. She was also promised five years of free travel with American Airlines as a prize, but only received two free trips. She also received a Rolex watch.

In 1994, Larson came second in her age category at the Get in Gear race in Minneapolis–Saint Paul. In 2006, Larson came seventh in her age category at a Minnesota Runners of the Year event.
