= Houston Marathon =

Held every January in Houston, Texas, US

- Date: Third Sunday in January
- Location: Houston, Texas, United States
- Event type: Road
- Distance: Marathon, Half marathon, 5K run
- Primary sponsor: Chevron (marathon); Aramco (half marathon)
- Established: 1972 (54 years ago)
- Course records: Marathon: Men: 2:06:39 (2024) (Morocco) Zouhair Talbi; Women: 2:19:12 (2022) (United States) Keira D'Amato; Half Marathon: Men: 59:17 (2025) (Ethiopia) Addisu Gobena; Women: 1:05:03 (2022) (Kenya) Vicoty Chepngeno
- Website: Houston Marathon
- Participants: ~33,000 (all races) (2020); 23,613 (2019)

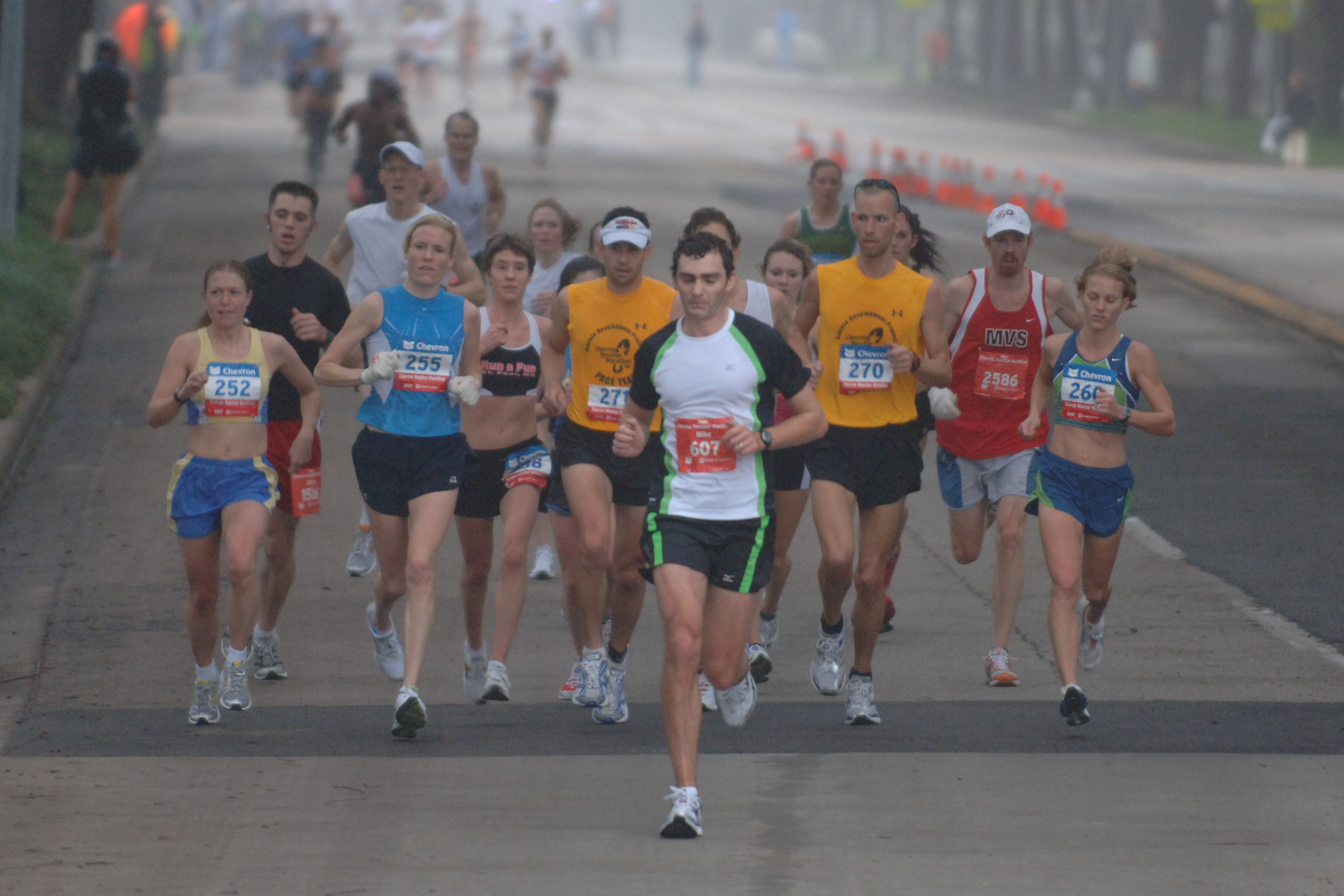
Marathon runners in 2007

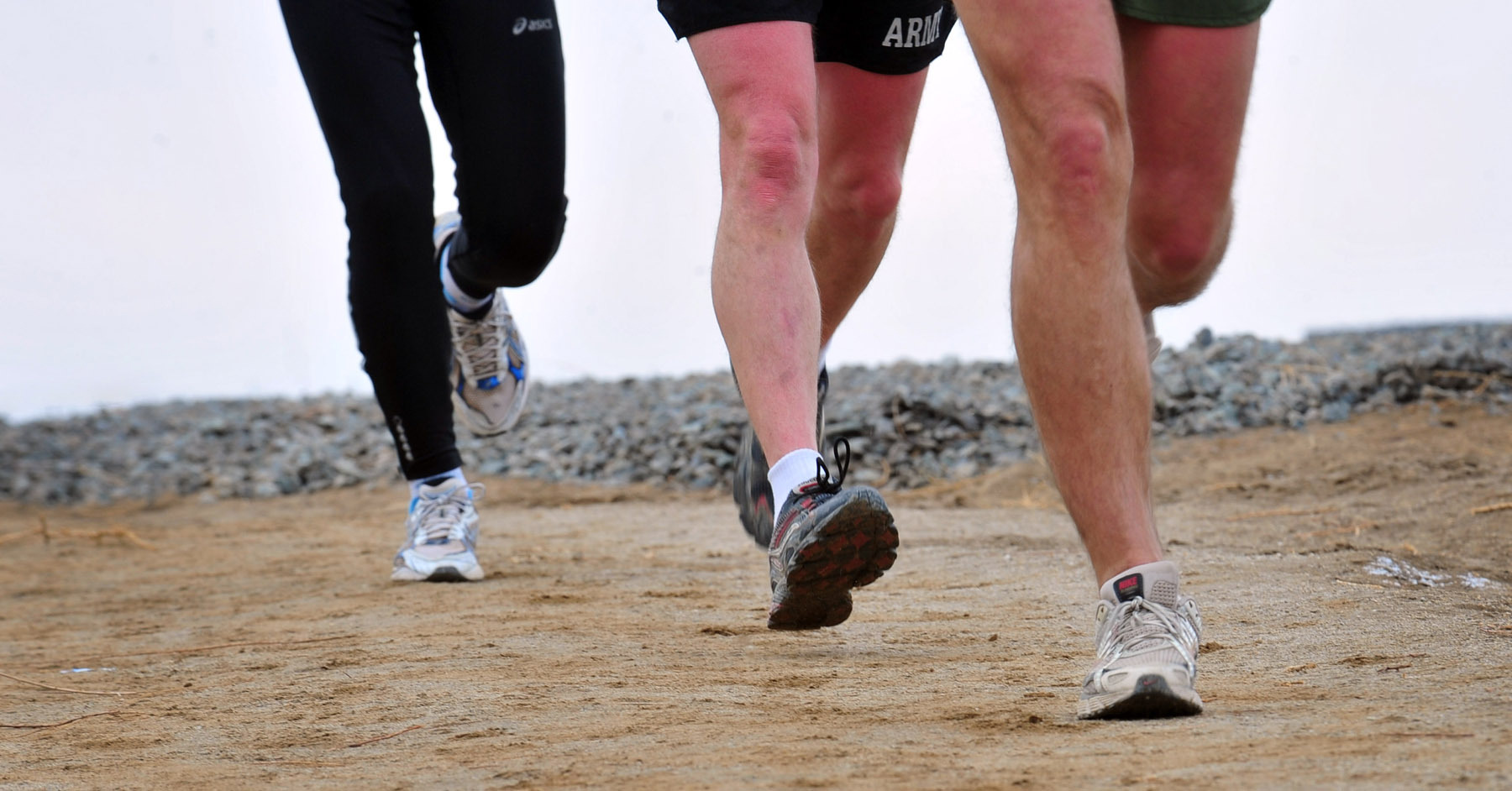
A shadow run of the half marathon, held at Forward Operating Base Ghazni in Afghanistan in 2011

The Houston Marathon is an annual marathon usually held every January in Houston, Texas, United States, since 1972. With thousands of runners and spectators, it is the largest single day sporting event in the city. It is run concurrently with a half marathon and a 5 km race. The 2007 race included the first-ever satellite running of the event, run simultaneously in Fallujah, Iraq.

The races bring crowds of nearly one half million to view the runners.

== History ==
The first marathon, run on December 30, 1972, featured 113 runners and a crowd of approximately 200 people. The course was a loop of 5 mi (8 km), and runners were served beef stew after the race.

The 1979 edition of the competition hosted the national marathon championship race for men and women. Houston was selected for the women's Olympic Trials in 1992 and held the USATF women's marathon championship in 1998. The half marathon course hosted the USATF Men's Half Marathon Championship from 2005 to 2008, and also hosted the women's event in 2007 and 2008. The 2012 U.S. Olympic Marathon Trials for both men and women were held the Saturday prior to the Sunday races.

George W. Bush ran in the Houston Marathon at age 46 in 1993, finishing with a time of 3 hours, 44 minutes, 52 seconds.

The 2014 edition included a 5K event run on Saturday, January 18th and the marathon and half marathon run on Sunday, January 19th. The 5K event had close to 5,000 runners while the marathon and half marathon had nearly 13,000 runners each.

The 2021 in-person edition of the race was cancelled due to the coronavirus pandemic, with all registrants given the option of running the race virtually (and receiving a discount for the race in 2022), or transferring their entry to 2022 or 2023. The virtual marathon was planned for January 2021.

== Course ==
External image
- Course map of full marathon in 2019

The fast and flat course starts in the downtown area near Daikin Park and takes runners past scenic Houston areas and communities—including Houston Heights and Neartown, past Hermann Park and Rice University, over to Uptown, and then through Memorial Park and Allen Parkway, finishing at the George R. Brown Convention Center downtown. The course is USATF certified and is popular with runners seeking to qualify for the Boston Marathon. The race time limit is 6 hours and a limit of 27,000 entries is enforced, divided evenly between the full and half marathons.

The course was changed for 2014. Changes included starting on Congress St. downtown, eliminating a section of the course through the Heights, and adding 2 miles along Kirby Dr.

== Community impact ==
The event supports many charities, including CanCare, Texas Children's Hospital, and The Leukemia & Lymphoma Society.

== Sponsorship ==
The current corporate sponsor of the marathon is Chevron Corporation. Aramco sponsors the half marathon and Chevron and Aramco co-sponsor the 5K run.

== Winners ==
Key:

Course record
^{†} = Time was a record mark for the state of Texas

=== Marathon ===
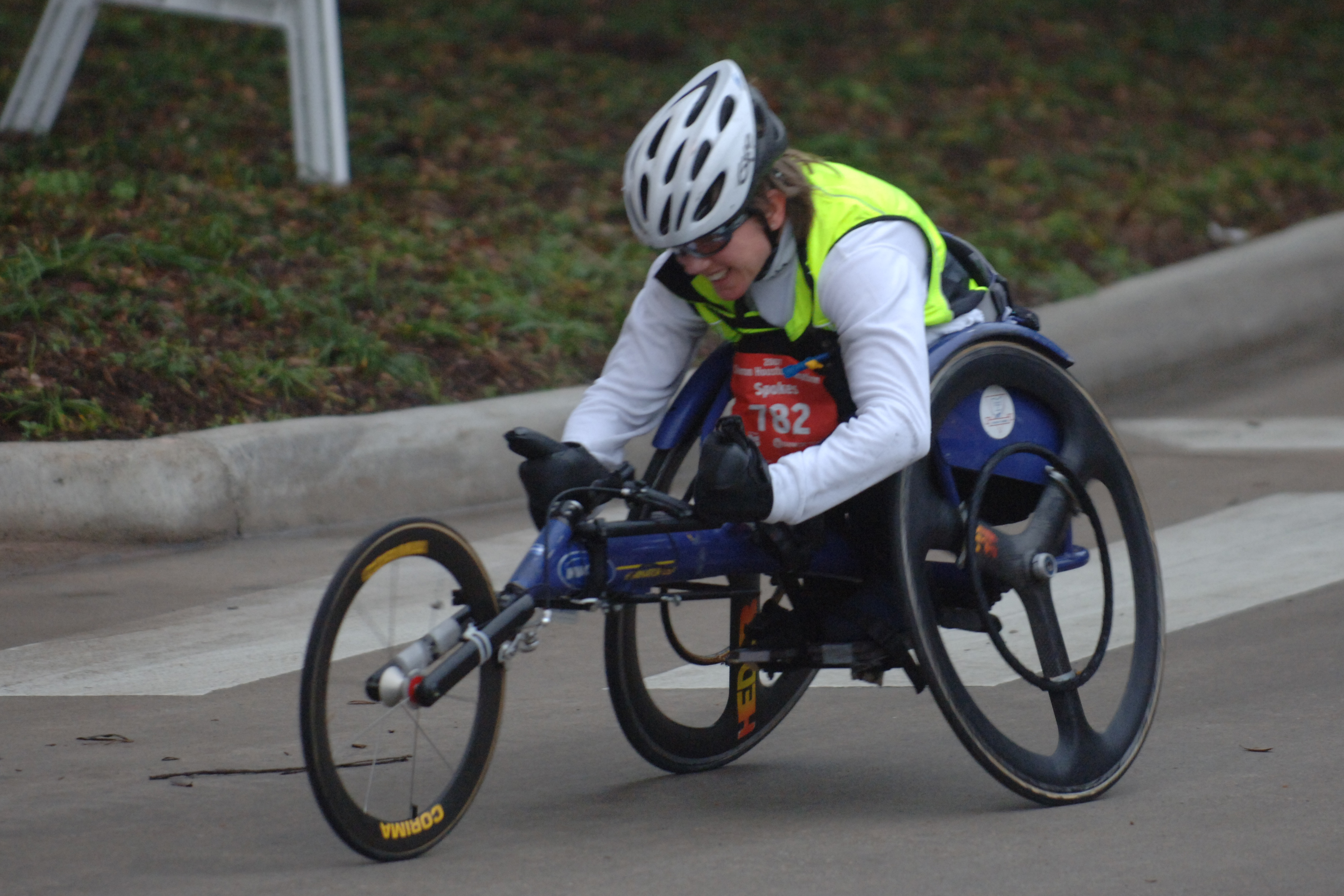
Holly Koester, winner of the 2007 marathon, approaching Mile 10

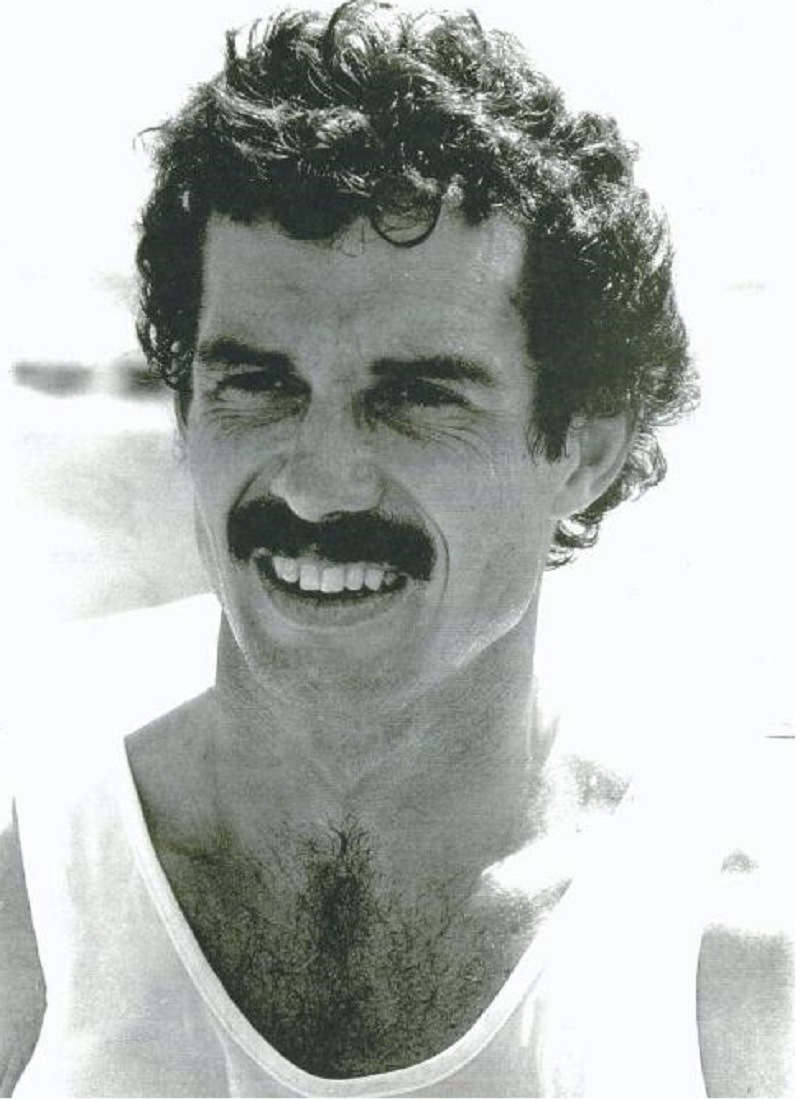
Paul Cummings after winning the marathon in 1986

Ed.	Year	Men's winner	Time	Women's winner	Time
52	January 19, 2025	Haimro Alame (ISR)	2:08:17	Kumeshi Sichala (ETH)	2:20:42
51	January 14, 2024	Zouhair Talbi (MAR)	2:06:36^{†}	Rahma Tusa (ETH)	2:19:33
50	January 15, 2023	Dominic Ondoro (KEN)	2:10:36	Hitomi Niiya (JPN)	2:19:24
49	January 16, 2022	James Ngandu (KEN)	2:11:03	Keira D'Amato (USA)	2:19:12^{†} NR
	2021	cancelled due to coronavirus pandemic			
48	January 19, 2020	Kelkile Gezahegn (ETH)	2:08:36	Askale Merachi (ETH)	2:23:29
47	January 20, 2019	Albert Korir (KEN)	2:10:02	Biruktayit Degefa (ETH)	2:23:28
46	January 14, 2018	Bazu Worku (ETH)	2:08:30	Biruktayit Degefa (ETH)	2:24:51
45	January 15, 2017	Dominic Ondoro (KEN)	2:12:05	Meskerem Assefa (ETH)	2:30:18
44	January 17, 2016	Birhanu Gedefa (ETH)	2:10:54	Biruktayit Degefa (ETH)	2:26:07
43	January 18, 2015	Birhanu Gedefa (ETH)	2:08:03	Yebrgual Melese (ETH)	2:23:23
42	January 19, 2014	Bazu Worku (ETH)	2:07:32	Abebech Afework (ETH)	2:25:52
41	January 13, 2013	Bazu Worku (ETH)	2:10:17	Merima Mohammed (ETH)	2:23:37
40	January 15, 2012	Tariku Jufar (ETH)	2:06:51	Alemitu Abera (ETH)	2:23:14^{†}
39	January 30, 2011	Bekana Daba (ETH)	2:07:04^{†}	Mamitu Daska (ETH)	2:26:33
38	January 18, 2010	Teshome Gelana (ETH)	2:07:37^{†}	Teyba Erkesso (ETH)	2:23:53^{†}
37	January 18, 2009	Deriba Merga (ETH)	2:07:52^{†}	Teyba Erkesso (ETH)	2:24:15^{†}
36	January 13, 2008	David Cheruiyot (KEN)	2:12:32	Dire Tune (ETH)	2:24:40
35	January 14, 2007	Feyisa Tusse (ETH)	2:11:39	Dire Tune (ETH)	2:26:52
34	January 15, 2006	David Cheruiyot (KEN)	2:12:02	Firiya Sultanova (RUS)	2:32:25
33	January 16, 2005	David Cheruiyot (KEN)	2:14:50	Kelly Keane (USA)	2:32:27
32	January 18, 2004	Marek Jaroszewski (POL)	2:18:51	Margarita Tapia (MEX)	2:28:36
31	January 19, 2003	Sean Wade (NZL)	2:24:43	Albina Gallyamova (RUS)	2:42:37
30	January 20, 2002	Drew Prisner (USA)	2:28:43	Becky Sondag (USA)	2:50:49
29	January 14 2001	Chris Ciamarra (USA)	2:29:27	Stacie Alboucrek (USA)	2:43:40
28	January 16, 2000	Stephen Ndungu (KEN)	2:11:28	Tatyana Pozdnyakova (UKR)	2:32:25
27	January 17, 1999	Stephen Ndungu (KEN)	2:14:56	Tatyana Pozdnyakova (UKR)	2:33:23
26	January 18, 1998	Stephen Ndungu (KEN)	2:11:23	Gwyn Coogan (USA)	2:33:37
25	January 12, 1997	Åke Eriksson (SWE)	2:19:21	Claudia Dreher (GER)	2:36:13
24	January 21, 1996	Tumo Turbo (ETH)	2:10:34	Adriana Fernández (MEX)	2:31:59
23	January 15, 1995	Peter Fonseca (CAN)	2:11:52	Tatyana Pozdnyakova (UKR)	2:29:57
22	January 16, 1994	Colin Moore (GBR)	2:13:34	Alevtina Naumova (RUS)	2:34:47
21	January 24, 1993	Frank Bjorkli (NOR)	2:13:21	Kristy Johnston (USA)	2:29:05
20	January 26, 1992	Filemon López (MEX)	2:13:12	Janis Klecker (USA)	2:30:12
19	January 20, 1991	Carey Nelson (CAN)	2:12:28	Véronique Marot (GBR)	2:30:55
18	January 14, 1990	Paul Pilkington (USA)	2:11:13	María Trujillo (USA)	2:32:55
17	January 15, 1989	Richard Kaitany (KEN)	2:10:04	Véronique Marot (GBR)	2:30:16
16	January 17, 1988	Geir Kvernmo (NOR)	2:11:44	Linda Zeman (USA)	2:34:52
15	January 18, 1987	Derrick May (RSA)	2:11:51	Bente Moe (NOR)	2:32:37
14	January 19, 1986	Paul Cummings (USA)	2:11:31	Véronique Marot (GBR)	2:31:33
13	January 6, 1985	Marty Froelick (USA)	2:11:14	Silvia Ruegger (CAN)	2:28:36
12	January 15, 1984	Charlie Spedding (GBR)	2:11:54	Ingrid Kristiansen (NOR)	2:27:51
11	January 16, 1983	Hailu Ebba (ETH)	2:12:17	Ingrid Kristiansen (NOR)	2:33:27
10	January 24, 1982	Benji Durden (USA)	2:11:12	Laurie Binder (USA)	2:40:56
9	January 10, 1981	Bill Rodgers (USA)	2:12:20	Patti Catalano (USA)	2:35:28
8	January 19, 1980	Ron Tabb (USA)	2:13:35	Vanessa Vajdos (USA)	2:44:45
7	January 20, 1979	Tom Antczak (USA)	2:15:28	Sue Petersen (USA)	2:46:17
6	January 21, 1978	Ron Tabb (USA)	2:17:11	Peggy Kokernot (USA)	3:01:54
5	January 22, 1977	Clent Mericle (USA)	2:27:46	Dorothy Doolittle (USA)	3:00:34
4	January 17, 1976	Jeff Wells (USA)	2:17:46	Marsha Johnson (USA)	3:37:04
3	January 18, 1975	Clent Mericle (USA)	2:35:00	Dorothy Doolittle (USA)	3:31:24
2	December 29, 1973	Juan Garza (USA)	2:37:47	Nancy Laird (USA)	4:29:07
1	December 30, 1972	Danny Green (USA)	2:32:33	Tanya Trantham (USA)	5:11:55

=== Half marathon ===
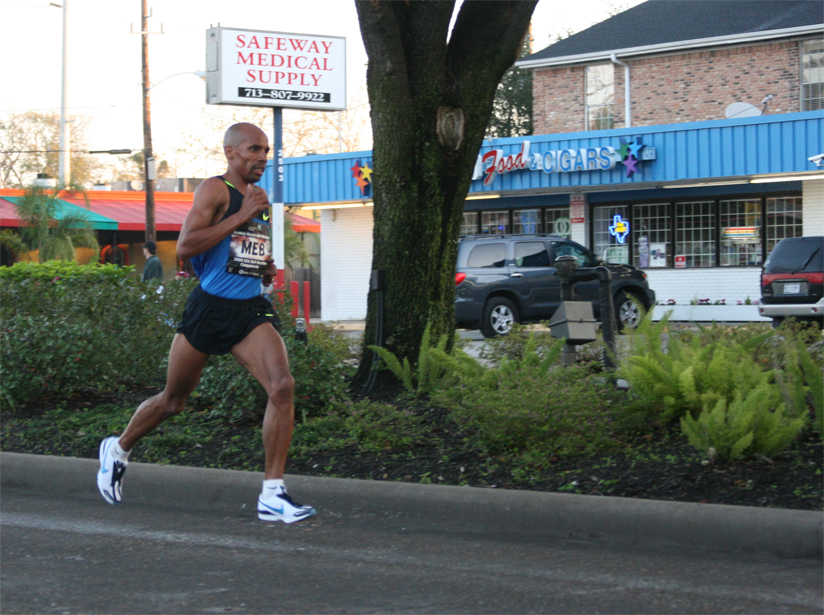
Meb Keflezighi, winner of the 2009 half marathon, on the race course

Year	Men's winner	Time	Women's winner	Time
2025	Addisu Gobena (ETH)	59:17	Senayet Getachew (ETH)	1:06:05
2024	Jemal Mekonen (ETH)	1:00:42	Sutume Kebede (ETH)	1:04:37^{†} (Note: Fastest women’s half marathon run in America)
2023	Leul Gebresilase (ETH)	1:00:34	Hiwot Gebremaryam (ETH)	1:06:28
2022	Milkesa Mengesha (ETH)	1:00:24	Vicoty Chepngeno (KEN)	1:05:03^{†}
2021	cancelled due to coronavirus pandemic			
2020	Jemal Yimer (ETH)	59:25	Hitomi Niiya (JPN)	1:06:38
2019	Shura Kitata (ETH)	1:00:11	Brigid Kosgei (KEN)	1:05:50
2018	Jake Robertson (NZL)	1:00:01	Ruti Aga (ETH)	1:06:39
2017	Leonard Korir (USA)	1:01:14	Veronica Nyaruai (KEN)	1:07:58
2016	Lelisa Desisa (ETH)	1:00:37	Mary Wacera (KEN)	1:06:29
2015	Diego Estrada (USA)	1:00:51	Kim Conley (USA)	1:09:44
2014	Meb Keflezighi (USA)	1:01:23	Serena Burla (USA)	1:10:48
2013	Feyisa Lilesa (ETH)	1:01:54	Mamitu Daska (ETH)	1:09:53
2012	Feyisa Lilesa (ETH)	59:22	Belaynesh Oljira (ETH)	1:08:26
2011	Jeffrey Eggleston (USA)	1:08:26	Colleen De Reuck (USA)	1:16:19
2010	Antonio Vega (USA)	1:01:54	Shalane Flanagan (USA)	1:09:41
2009	Meb Keflezighi (USA)	1:01:25	Magdalena Lewy-Boulet (USA)	1:11:47
2008	James Carney (USA)	1:02:21	Kate O'Neill (USA)	1:11:57
2007	Ryan Hall (USA)	59:43	Elva Dryer (USA)	1:11:42
2006	Nicodemus Malakwen (KEN)	1:02:07	Asmae Leghzaoui (MAR)	1:11:53
2005	Julius Koskei (KEN)	1:03:17	Olga Romanova (RUS)	1:12:36
2004	Gilbert Koech (KEN)	1:03:08	Colleen De Reuck (USA)	1:10:55
2003	Scott Strand (USA)	1:05:13	Beth Old (USA)	1:17:03
2002	Justin Chaston (USA)	1:08:42	Christy Nielsen-Crotta (USA)	1:21:37

== National records ==
The current National Records were established during the Houston Marathon:

- Men Marathon
  - 1995: Borislav Devic (SRB) 2:13:57
- Women Marathon
  - 1996: Galina Goranova (BUL) 2:35:02
  - 2007: Melissa Henderson (BLZ) 3:05:13
  - 2019: Tania Chavez Moser (BOL) 2:43:24
  - 2020: Malindi Elmore (CAN) 2:24:50
  - 2022: Keira D'Amato (USA) 2:19:12
- Women 30km
  - 2019: Tania Chavez Moser (BOL) 1:55:48
  - 2020: Malindi Elmore (CAN) 1:42:53
- Women 25km
  - 2018: Hiruni Wijayaratne (SRI) 1:32:53
  - 2019: Tania Chavez Moser (BOL) 1:37:01
  - 2020: Malindi Elmore (CAN) 1:25:48
- Men Half-Marathon
  - 2019: Soh Rui Yong (SIN) 1:06:46
  - 2020: Gabriel Geay (TAN) 59:42
  - 2022: Rory Linkletter (CAN) 1:01:08
  - 2022: Alberto Gonzalez Mindez (GUA) 1:01:20
  - 2022: Mohamed Hrezi (LBN) 1:02:08
  - 2025: Conner Mantz (USA) 59:17
  - 2026: Rory Linkletter (CAN) 59:49
- Women Half-Marathon
  - 2014 Jane Vongvorachoti (THA) 1:15:24
  - 2018 Molly Huddle (USA) 1:07:25
  - 2020 Hitomi Niiya (JPN) 1:06:38
  - 2022 Sara Hall (USA) 1:07:15
  - 2023 Emily Sisson (USA) 1:06:52
  - 2024 Weini Kelati (USA) 1:06:25
  - 2025 Weini Kelati (USA) 1:06:09
- Men 20km
  - 2019: Soh Rui Yong (SIN) 1:03:23
  - 2022: Rory Linkletter (CAN) 58:05
  - 2022: Alberto Gonzalez Mindez (GUA) 58:05
  - 2022: Mohamed Hrezi (LBN) 59:01
- Women 20km
  - 2018 Molly Huddle (USA) 1:03:48
  - 2020 Hitomi Niiya (JPN) 1:03:13
- Women 10miles
  - 2018 Molly Huddle (USA) 50:52
- Men 15km
  - 2022: Alberto Gonzalez Mindez (GUA) 43:21
  - 2022: Rory Linkletter (CAN) 43:23
- Men 10km
  - 2022: Alberto Gonzalez Mindez (GUA) 29:04
- Men 5km
  - 2022: Alberto Gonzalez Mindez (GUA) 14:41
  - 2022: Mohamed Hrezi (LBN) 14:50

== See also ==
- List of marathon races in North America
- National records in the marathon
