= 25 km =

25 km may refer to the following places in Russia:

- 25 km, Orenburg Oblast, a rural locality (a crossing) in Orenburg Oblast, Russia
- 25 km Zheleznoy Dorogi Monchegorsk–Olenya, a rural locality in Murmansk Oblast, Russia
- 25-y km, a rural locality (military barracks) in Primorsky Krai, Russia
