= Frankfurt Marathon =

Marathon in Frankfurt am Main, Hesse, Germany

- Logo
- Date: October
- Location: Frankfurt am Main, Germany
- Event type: Road
- Distance: 26.219 miles (42.195 km)
- Primary sponsor: Mainova
- Established: 1981
- Course records: Men's: 2:03:42 (2011) (Kenya) Wilson Kipsang; Women's: 2:17:25 (2024) (Ethiopia) Hawi Feysa
- Website: Frankfurt Marathon
- Participants: 10,553 (2019); 10,620 (2018); 7,984 (2022); 9,665 (2023); 13,939 (2024)

The Frankfurt Marathon (official name as of 2016: Mainova Frankfurt Marathon, until 2015: BMW Frankfurt Marathon, until 2010: Commerzbank Frankfurt Marathon) is a marathon which has taken place nearly every year in Frankfurt am Main since its inception in 1981. It is the longest-established city marathon in Germany and in terms of the number of finishers, Germany's second-largest. It is organised by the agency motion events.

== History ==
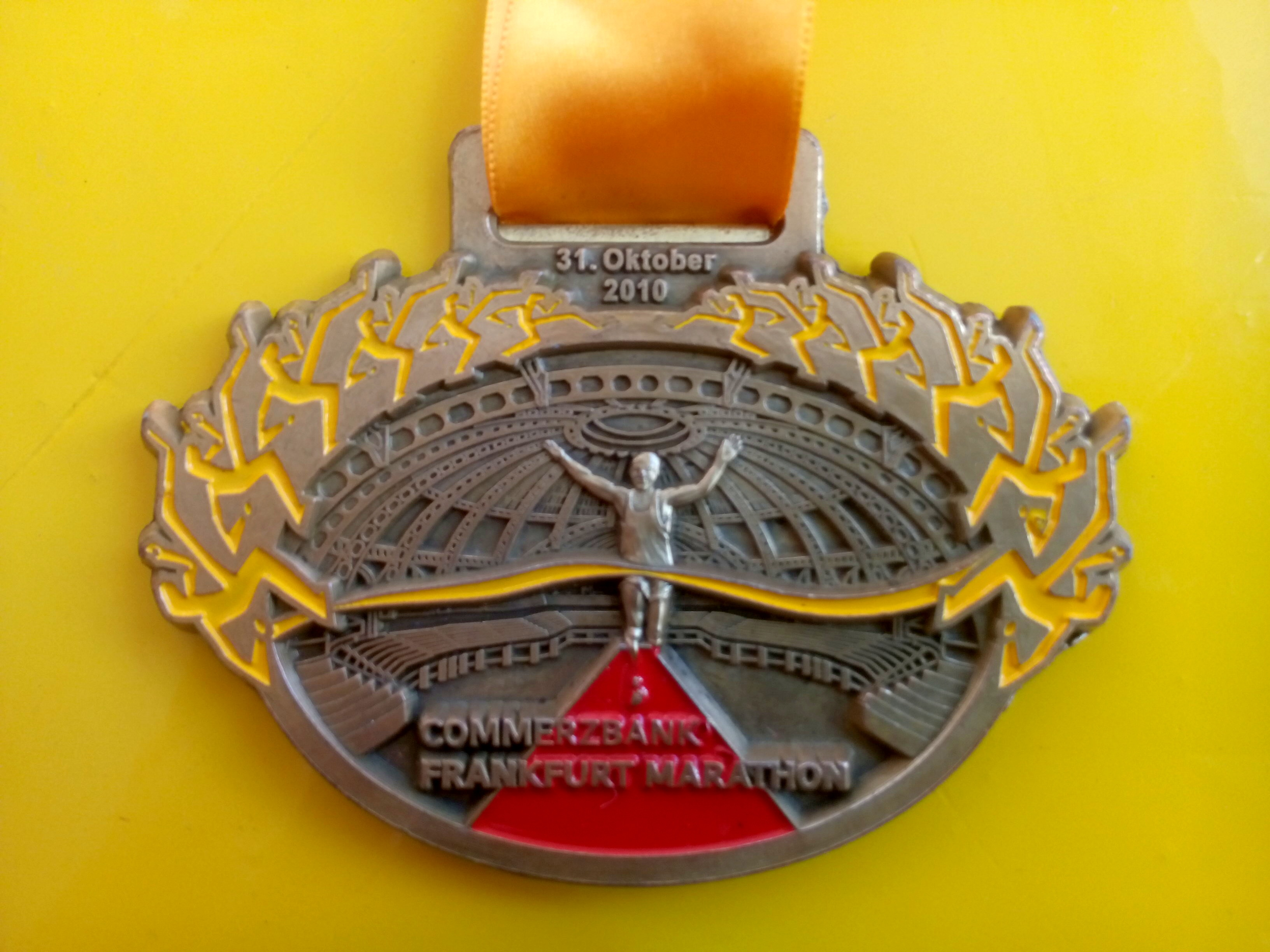
Finisher medal from 2010 marathon

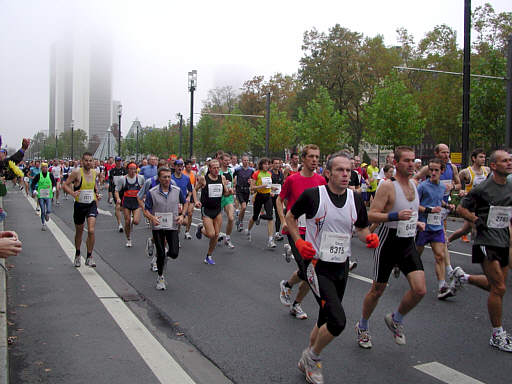
At the first km of the 2004 marathon

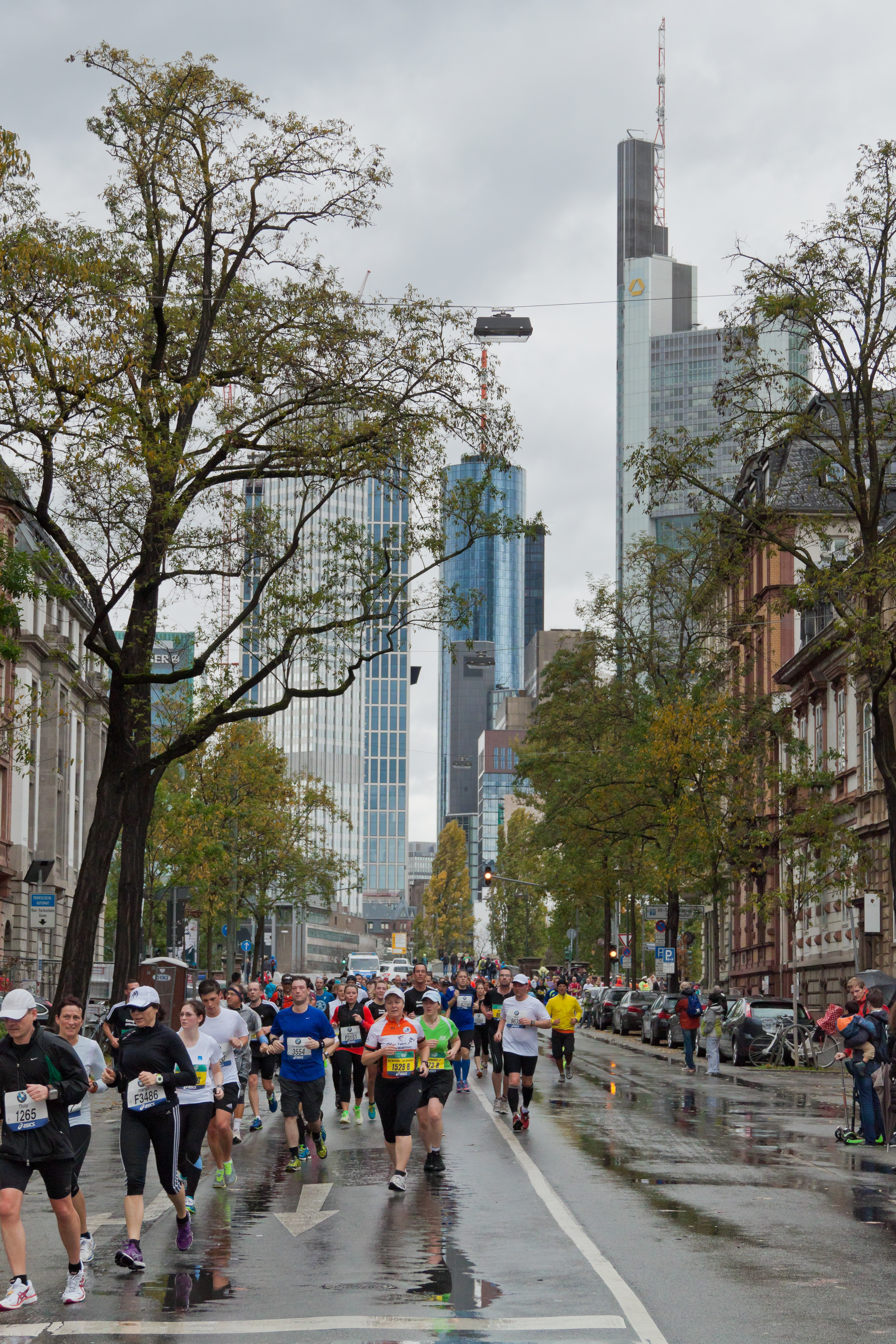
Around 14.5 km into the 2013 race

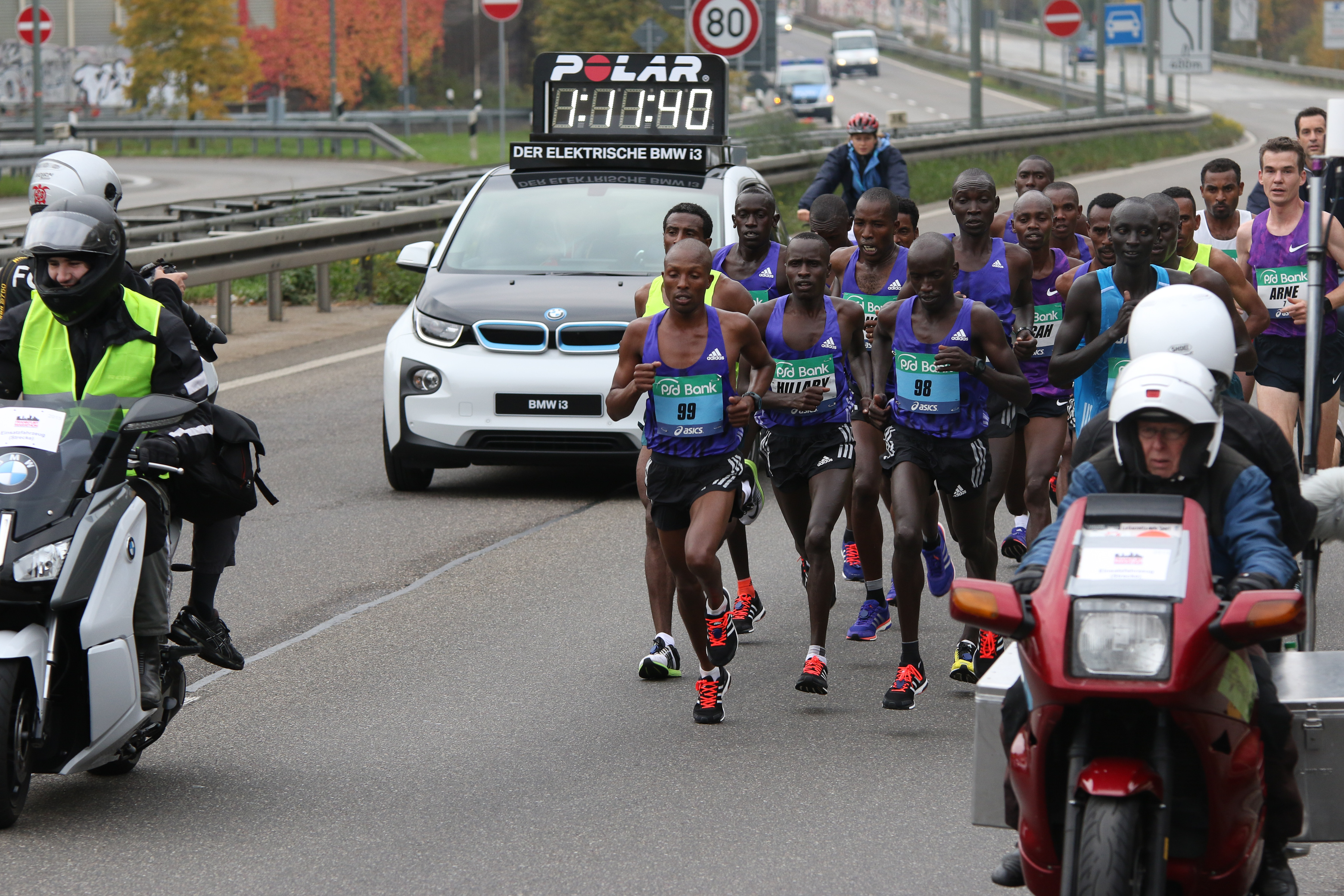
Lead runners and timing car, 2015

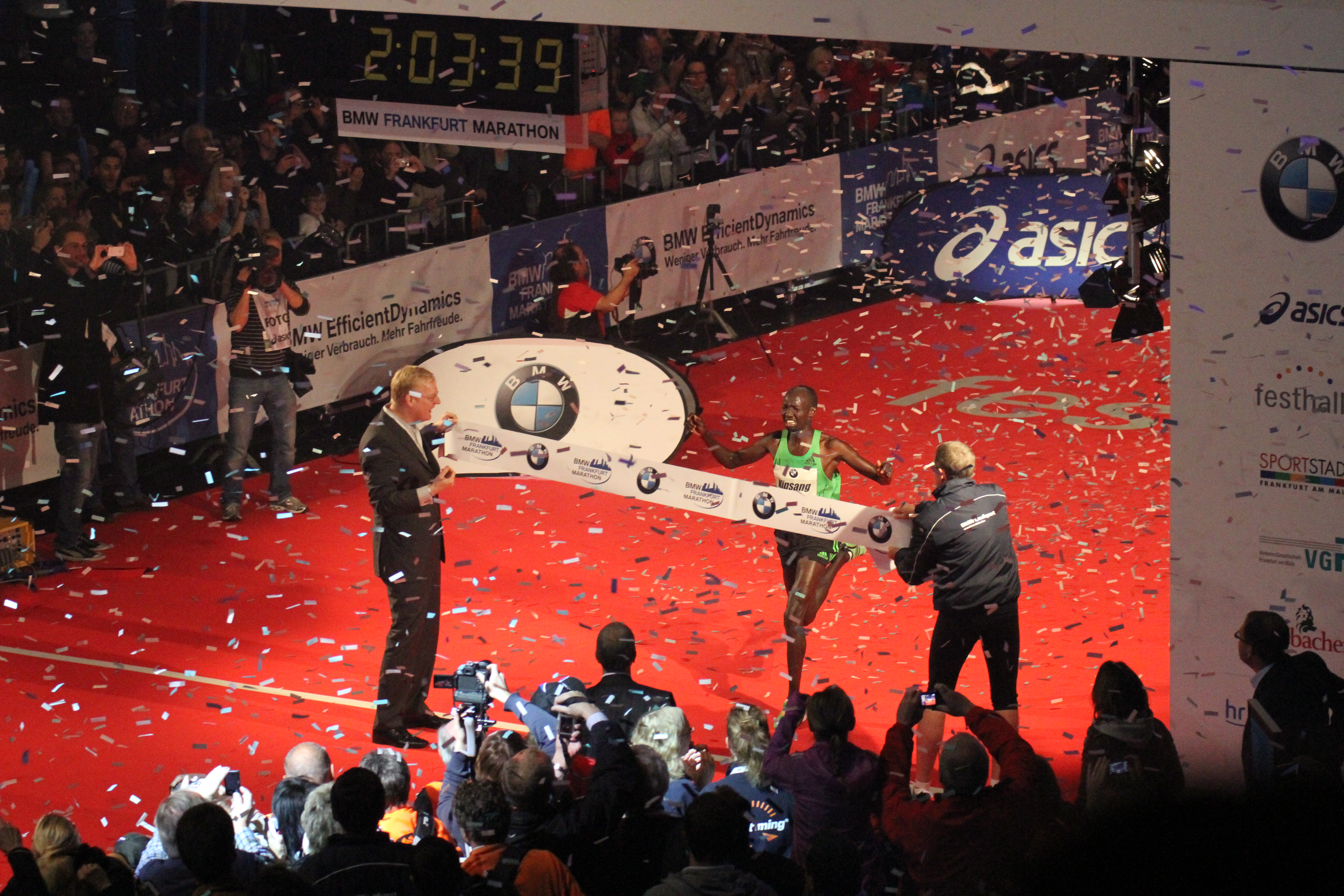
Wilson Kipsang Kiprotich winning the 2011 marathon

Five years after the first New York City Marathon, it was decided that the time was right to launch marathons within German cities. The OSC Hoechst 1960 athletics club organised the first Frankfurt Marathon in 1981, with Hoechst itself serving as the main sponsors. During the course of the same year, the Berlin Marathon and the Rhein-Ruhr-Marathon were also run for the first time.

Despite the number of finishers continually rising from 2588 in its first year to 7297 in 1985, Hoechst stopped organising the event. As a consequence, the marathon did not take place in 1986. In 1987 the city of Frankfurt and the athletics department of Eintracht Frankfurt reinstated the race. The date was moved to October and the Messegelände (exhibition grounds) became the new site for the start and finish.

The 2020 and 2021 editions of the race were cancelled due to the coronavirus pandemic.

== Course ==
The start of the course is on the Friedrich-Ebert-Anlage next to the iconic Messeturm. Upon reaching the Platz der Republik the course turns left into Mainzer Landstrasse. After a lap of the Taunusanlage athletes return to the start of the course and continue onwards to the Bockenheimer Warte, before going to the Alter Oper via Bockenheimer Landstrasse. The course then continues along Reuterweg and Bremer Strasse in a northerly direction as far as the Westend Campus at the University of Frankfurt, before returning to Opernplatz via Eschersheimer Landstrasse and the Bockenheimer Anlage. Continuing into Junghofstrasse the course heads into Roßmarkt then past the Frankfurt Stock Exchange, the Eschenheimer Tor and the Friedberger Tor before turning south towards and over the Alte Brücke over the River Main which brings the athletes into the suburb of Sachsenhausen on the southern side of the river. Athletes then run parallel to the Main in a westerly direction into the suburbs of Niederrad and Schwanheim. The only notable ascent on the course occurs at the bridge back over the Main in Schwanheim, and the participants continue westwards to the Bolangaropalast in Hoechst, Frankfurt's most westerly suburb. Athletes then turn back towards the city centre and run through the suburb of Nied via the Mainzer Landstrasse. The Galluswarte can be seen after 34 kilometres and the Alter Oper after 36. The course then continues along Taunusstrasse (English: Taunus Street) and Kaiserstrasse past the Taunusanlage and then the Roßmarkt is negotiated for the second time to Eschenheim. The last three kilometres go back past the Alter Oper and via the Platz der Republik into the Festhalle, where athletes run the last few metres on a specially-laid red carpet before crossing the finishing line.

== Winners ==
Key: Course record

Year	Men's winner	Time	Women's winner	Time
2025	Asfaw, Belay (ETH)	2:06:16	Kejela, Buze Diriba (ETH)	2:19:34
2024	Benard Biwott (KEN)	2:05:54	Hawi Feysa (ETH)	2:17:25
2023	Brimin Kipkorir (KEN)	2:04:53	Buzunesh Gudeta (ETH)	2:19:27
2022	Brimin Kipkorir (KEN)	2:06:11	Sally Chepyego Kaptich (KEN)	2:23:11
2021	cancelled due to coronavirus pandemic			
2020	cancelled due to coronavirus pandemic			
2019	Fikre Bekele (ETH)	2:07:08	Valary Aiyabei (KEN)	2:19:10
2018	Kelkile Gezahegn (ETH)	2:06:37	Meskerem Assefa (ETH)	2:20:36
2017	Shura Kitata (ETH)	2:05:50	Vivian Cheruiyot (KEN)	2:23:35
2016	Mark Korir (KEN)	2:06:48	Mamitu Daska (ETH)	2:25:27
2015	Sisay Lemma (ETH)	2:06:26	Gulume Tollesa (ETH)	2:23:12
2014	Mark Kiptoo (KEN)	2:06:49	Aberu Kebede (ETH)	2:22:21
2013	Vincent Kipruto (KEN)	2:06:15	Caroline Kilel (KEN)	2:22:34
2012	Patrick Makau (KEN)	2:06:08	Meselech Melkamu (ETH)	2:21:01
2011	Wilson Kipsang (KEN)	2:03:42	Mamitu Daska (ETH)	2:21:59
2010	Wilson Kipsang (KEN)	2:04:57	Caroline Kilel (KEN)	2:23:25
2009	Gilbert Kirwa (KEN)	2:06:14	Agnes Kiprop (KEN)	2:26:57
2008	Robert Kiprono (KEN)	2:07:21	Sabrina Mockenhaupt (GER)	2:26:22
2007	Wilfred Kigen (KEN)	2:07:58	Melanie Kraus (GER)	2:28:56
2006	Wilfred Kigen (KEN)	2:09:06	Svetlana Ponomarenko (RUS)	2:30:05
2005	Wilfred Kigen (KEN)	2:08:29	Alevtina Biktimirova (RUS)	2:25:12
2004	Boaz Kimaiyo (KEN)	2:09:10	Olesya Nurgaliyeva (RUS)	2:29:48
2003	Boaz Kimaiyo (KEN)	2:09:28	Luminita Zaituc (GER)	2:29:41
2002	Eliud Kering (KEN)	2:12:32	María Abel (ESP)	2:26:58
2001	Pavel Loskutov (EST)	2:11:09	Luminita Zaituc (GER)	2:26:01
2000	Henry Cherono (KEN)	2:10:40	Esther Barmasai (KEN)	2:31:04
1999	Pavel Loskutov (EST)	2:12:37	Esther Barmasai (KEN)	2:33:58
1998	Abel Gisemba (KEN)	2:11:40	Angelina Kanana (KEN)	2:31:38
1997	Michael Fietz (GER)	2:10:59	Katrin Dörre-Heinig (GER)	2:26:48
1996	Martin Bremer (GER)	2:13:38	Katrin Dörre-Heinig (GER)	2:28:33
1995	Oleg Otmakhov (RUS)	2:12:35	Katrin Dörre-Heinig (GER)	2:31:31
1994	Terje Næss (NOR)	2:13:19	Franziska Moser (SUI)	2:27:44
1993	Stephan Freigang (GER)	2:11:53	Sissel Grottenberg (NOR)	2:36:50
1992	Steffen Dittmann (GER)	2:12:59	Bente Moe (NOR)	2:32:36
1991	Herbert Steffny (GER)	2:13:45	Linda Milo (BEL)	2:35:11
1990	Konrad Dobler (GER)	2:13:29	Kerstin Preßler (GER)	2:34:13
1989	Herbert Steffny (FRG)	2:13:51	Iris Biba (FRG)	2:33:14
1988	Jos Sasse (NED)	2:13:15	Grete Kirkeberg (NOR)	2:35:44
1987	Lindsay Robertson (GBR)	2:13:30	Annabel Holtkamp (FRG)	2:45:21
1986	not held			
1985	Herbert Steffny (FRG)	2:12:12	Carla Beurskens (NED)	2:28:37
1984	Dereje Nedi (ETH)	2:11:18	Charlotte Teske (FRG)	2:31:16
1983	Ahmet Altun (TUR)	2:12:41	Charlotte Teske (FRG)	2:28:32
1982	Delfim Moreira (POR)	2:12:54	Heidi Hutterer (FRG)	2:36:38
1981	Kjell-Erik Ståhl (SWE)	2:13:20	Doris Schlosser (FRG)	2:47:13

=== Multiple wins ===
Men's
Athlete	Wins	Years
Herbert Steffny (GER)	3	1985, 1989, 1991
Wilfred Kigen (KEN)	3	2005, 2006, 2007
Pavel Loskutov (EST)	2	1999, 2001
Boaz Kimaiyo (KEN)	2	2003, 2004
Wilson Kipsang (KEN)	2	2010, 2011
Brimin Kipkorir (KEN)	2	2022, 2023

Women's
Athlete	Wins	Years
Katrin Dörre-Heinig (GER)	3	1995, 1996, 1997
Charlotte Teske (GER)	2	1983, 1984
Esther Barmasai (KEN)	2	1999, 2000
Luminita Zaituc (GER)	2	2001, 2003
Caroline Kilel (KEN)	2	2010, 2013
Mamitu Daska (ETH)	2	2011, 2016

=== By country ===
Country	Total	Men's	Women's
Kenya	28	19	9
Germany	22	8	14
Ethiopia	13	5	8
Norway	4	1	3
Russia	4	1	3
Netherlands	2	1	1
Estonia	2	2	0
Sweden	1	1	0
Portugal	1	1	0
Turkey	1	1	0
United Kingdom	1	1	0
Belgium	1	0	1
Switzerland	1	0	1
Spain	1	0	1
