= Makda Harun =

Ethiopian-Australian marathon runner

Makda Harun (born 1988) is an Ethiopian born Australian marathon runner.

In 2009 she was second in the Paris Half Marathon, won the Cursa de Bombers and finished fourth in the Venice Marathon.

In 2010 she was second in the Daegu Marathon and set a course record at the Venice Marathon.

She won the Sydney Marathon, in both 2016 and 2017, during the second of which she set the course record of 2:28:04.

== Personal bests ==
- 5000 m : 15:31.21 min, 28 September 2007, Shanghai
- 10 km road race : 32:39 min, Barcelona
- Half Marathon : 1:10:39 h, 15 October 2017, Melbourne
- Marathon: 2:26:46 h, 15 April 2012, Paris
