= Gwynneth Coogan =

American educator, mathematician and runner

Personal information
- Born: August 21, 1965 (age 61) Trenton, New Jersey, United States

Sport
- Sport: Track and field

Gwynneth "Gwyn" Coogan (born Gwynneth Hardesty; August 21, 1965) is an American educator, mathematician, and former Olympic runner.

== Biography ==
Coogan attended Phillips Exeter Academy for two years, where she played squash and field hockey. She then attended Smith College, graduating in 1987, where she majored in mathematics and took up running for the first time, and became the two-time NCAA Division III champion in the 3,000 meters. She qualified for the 1992 Summer Olympics in Barcelona, where she competed in the 10,000 meters. In 1996, Coogan and her husband, Mark Coogan, also a competitive runner, were the first married couple to compete in the U.S. Olympic marathon trials in the same year. Gwyn finished fourth, which placed her as an alternate for the Games in Atlanta, while Mark finished second and went on to compete in the Games. In September of that year Mark and Gwyn would go on to be the first married couple to win the historic Virginia 10 Miler in Lynchburg, Virginia.

She was the United States national champion in the marathon in 1998.

Coogan went on to earn her Ph.D. in math from the University of Colorado in 1999, working primarily in number theory. She did post-doctorate work with Ken Ono at the University of Wisconsin–Madison, taught at Hood College, and currently teaches mathematics at Phillips Exeter Academy. As of January 2024, she holds the George Albert Wentworth Professor in Mathematics position at Exeter.

== Achievements ==
Year	Competition	Venue	Position	Notes
Representing the United States
1992	Olympic Games	Barcelona, Spain	13th in Heat 1	10,000 meters
1994	Goodwill Games	Saint Petersburg, Russia	3rd place, bronze medalist(s)	10,000 meters
1995	Twin Cities Marathon	Twin Cities, Minnesota	1st place, gold medalist(s)	2:32:58
1998	USA Marathon Championships: Methodist Healthcare Houston Marathon	Houston, Texas	1st place, gold medalist(s)	2:33:37
