= 1979 Chicago Marathon =

American marathon

3rd Chicago Marathon
- Venue: Chicago, United States
- Dates: October 21

Champions
- Men: Dan Cloeter (2:23:20)
- Women: Laura Michalek (3:15:45)

The 1979 Chicago Marathon was the third running of the annual marathon race in Chicago, United States and was held on October 21. The elite men's and women's races were won by Americans Dan Cloeter (2:23:20 hours) and Laura Michalek (3:15:45). A total of 2869 runners finished the race, a drop of nearly 1200 from the previous year.

== Results ==
=== Men ===
Position	Athlete	Nationality	Time
1st place, gold medalist(s)	Dan Cloeter	United States	2:23:20
2nd place, silver medalist(s)	Mike Healer	United States	2:27:36
3rd place, bronze medalist(s)	Patrick Chmiel	United States	2:33:51
4	Antonio Peso	United States	2:36:21
5	Rick Wilson	United States	2:36:40
6	Don White	United States	2:38:56
7	Jon Eggers	United States	2:39:22
8	John Wellerding	United States	2:40:00
9	Robert Prince	United States	2:40:20
10	Thomas Benedict	United States	2:43.03

=== Women ===
Position	Athlete	Nationality	Time
1st place, gold medalist(s)	Laura Michalek	United States	3:15:45
2nd place, silver medalist(s)	Lynae Larson	United States	3:16:45
3rd place, bronze medalist(s)	Marilyn Reinhardt	United States	3:17:40
4	Diane Sims Page	United States	3:26:05
5	Helen Rea	United States	3:29:45
6	Susie Sandstrom	United States	3:30:20
7	Charlene Groet	United States	3:30:50
8	Edna Craig	United States	3:31:05
9	Lorraine Norgle	United States	3:37:20
10	Joan Hirt	United States	3:43:50
