= Dorothy Doolittle =

American marathon runner and athletics coach

Personal information
- Born: October 17, 1946 (age 79) Elgin, Texas, U.S.
- Height: 4 ft 11.75 in (152 cm)
- Weight: 90 lb (41 kg)

Sport
- Sport: Athletics
Medal record
Marathon
Major marathons
Representing United States
Bronze medal – third place	1976 Boston	Marathon
Gold medal – first place	1977 Chicago	Marathon

Dorothy Doolittle (born October 17, 1946) is an American former marathon runner and athletics coach, who won the inaugural Chicago Marathon in 1977. She was an assistant coach of the US Women's team at the 1992 Summer Olympics.

== Early life ==
Doolittle was brought up in Elgin, Texas. She studied at the University of Mary Hardin–Baylor in Belton, Texas. At her college, women could only run in events up to 800m.

== Career ==
Doolittle's first competitive event was the 1973 Houston Marathon. In 1975, Doolittle won the Houston Marathon, and the Rice Festival Marathon in Crowley, Louisiana. In 1976, she won the White Rock Marathon (now the Dallas Marathon), and came third at the Boston Marathon. She forgot to wear her running watch at the Boston Marathon, which she believes cost her many minutes of time, and a chance of victory. At the time, she was recorded as being the eight fastest female marathon runner in the world, and the fastest in Texas state. In the same year, Doolittle won the marathon event at the Amateur Athletic Union Championships.

In 1977, Doolittle won the Houston Marathon again, in a record time. As such, she was invited to attend the inaugural Chicago Marathon. She had to pay an entrance fee of $5 to enter the race, and paid for her own transport to the event. Doolittle won the race, in a time of 2:50:47, winning the race by over four minutes. Later in the year, Doolittle lost the trophy that had been awarded to her for winning the event. The 1977 Chicago Marathon was Doolittle's last competitive race.

In 2002, Doolittle competed at the 5,000 meter race that accompanied that year's Chicago Marathon. It was the first time Doolittle had attended the marathon since her victory.

=== Coaching career ===
Doolittle has coached at high schools and colleges including Westlake High School, Hill Country Middle School, and the Universities of Missouri, Houston, Stanford and Tennessee. She was head coach at Tennessee from 1989 to 1997, and whilst coaching there, she was selected as coach of the US women's team for the 1991 Pan American Games. She was also an assistant coach of the US women's team at the 1992 Summer Olympics in Barcelona, Spain. In 1993, Doolittle was given the NACDA/USOC Collegiate Olympic Coaches award. Doolittle returned to Elgin in 1999, to teach in the Elgin Independent School District.
