= 2026 Sydney Marathon =

26.2 mi (42.195 km) race held in Sydney Australia

26th Sydney Marathon
- Location: Sydney, Australia
- Dates: 30 August 2026; 2 months ago
- Website: tcssydneymarathon.com

Champions
- Men: Addisu Gobena (2:04:42 CR)
- Women: Irine Cheptai (2:22:11)
- Wheelchair men: Daniel Romanchuk (1:26:50)
- Wheelchair women: Manuela Schär (1:42:04)

The 2026 Sydney Marathon was the 26th edition of the event and notably the second running since the race was announced as the seventh addition to the World Marathon Majors in November 2024.

== Background ==
The race had 120,000 applications in 2026 with an expected 40,000 runners set to participate. A blunder was committed in the creation of the event medals where they depicted the Allianz Arena in Germany as opposed to the Sydney Football Stadium (2022) known as Allianz Stadium in its depiction of the Sydney skyline. Reigning marathon world champions Alphonce Simbu and Peres Jepchirchir were set to compete in the elite field.

=== Doping ban ===
Peres Jepchirchir (33) of Kenya was originally recorded as the winner of the women's competition crossing the finish line with a time of 2:18:31. However, following the results of an out-of-competition doping test which returned positive for EPO prior to the Sydney Marathon in August, her title was disqualified. Irine Cheptai thus became the winner of the women's competition. Jepchirchir initially denied EPO use but eventually signed an admission of anti-doping rule violations and acceptance of consequences form and received a three year ban.

== Results ==
The Sydney Marathon began on 30 August at 6:30am local time.

=== Men ===
Elite men's top 10 finishers
Position	Athlete	Nationality	Time
1st place, gold medalist(s)	Addisu Gobena	Ethiopia	2:04:42 CR
2nd place, silver medalist(s)	Chimdessa Debele	Ethiopia	2:04:46
3rd place, bronze medalist(s)	Tebello Ramakongoana	Lesotho	2:04:57
4	Alphonce Simbu	Tanzania	2:04:57
5	Jemal Mekonnen	Ethiopia	2:04:59
6	Hailemaryam Kiros	Ethiopia	2:05:16
7	Vincent Ngetich	Kenya	2:05:28
8	Dawit Wolde	Ethiopia	2:06:41
9	Kennedy Kimutai	Kenya	2:06:50
10	Gilbert Kibet	Kenya	2:07:13

=== Women ===
Elite women's top 10 finishers
Position	Athlete	Nationality	Time
1st place, gold medalist(s)	Irine Cheptai	Kenya	2:22:11
2nd place, silver medalist(s)	Shure Demise	Ethiopia	2:22:33
3rd place, bronze medalist(s)	Haven Hailu	Ethiopia	2:22:57
4	Meseret Abebayahau	Ethiopia	2:23:40
5	Priscah Cherono	Kenya	2:23:49
6	Stella Chesang	Uganda	2:23:52
7	Fikrte Wereta	Ethiopia	2:25:18
8	Ellie Pashley	Australia	2:28:28
9	Aberu Ayana	Ethiopia	2:28:30
10	Milly Clark	Australia	2:29:47
