= Wilfred Kibet Kigen =

Kenyan long-distance runner

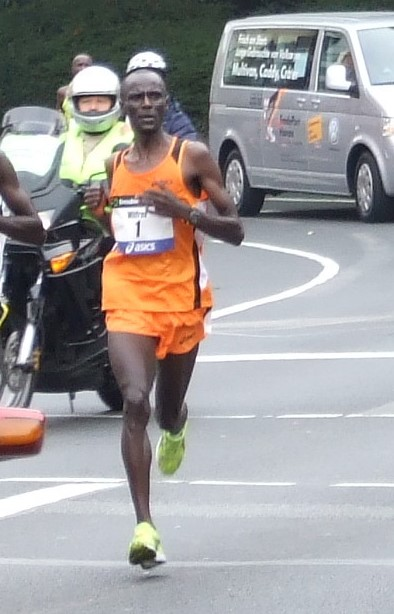
Kigen en route to victory in the 2007 Frankfurt Marathon

Wilfred Kibet Kigen (born 23 February 1975) is a Kenyan long-distance runner who primarily competes in marathon races in Germany. His personal best for the distance is 2:07:33 hours, set in 2007. He is a three-time winner of the Frankfurt Marathon and won the Hamburg Marathon in 2010, after having finished as runner-up on three occasions.

== Career ==
Hailing from Eldoret, Kenya, he had a childhood steeped in long-distance running – every day he would run 10 km to school as a child and his mother had been a successful athlete herself in the 1960s, winning prizes at track races in Uganda. Kigen was persuaded by Wilson Boit Kipketer (a world record holder in the steeplechase) to move to Ngong to focus on his running. It was through Boit Kipketer's suggestion that Kigen got his late start in competitive running at the age of 24.

Kigen started out as a 3000 metres steeplechase specialist, but changed to the marathon distance in 2004. That year he set a personal best of 2:11.52 for fifth place at the Hamburg Marathon, and also took fourth place at the 2004 Amsterdam Marathon. He improved his best time to 2:09:18 at the 2005 Hamburg Marathon to take second place behind Julio Rey Kigen had his first major victory in October that year as he knocked a second off the Frankfurt Marathon course record with a run of 2:08:29 (holding off challenges from his cousin Wilson Kigen and Jason Mbote in a quick finish).

He managed only fourth place at the 2006 Hamburg Marathon but went on to retain his title in Frankfurt. He took on both races again the following year and started well by running a personal best of 2:07:33 for second place in Hamburg behind Rodgers Rop. He became the first man to run sub-2:08 at the Frankfurt Marathon – challenged by the quick running of Hosea Rotich, Kigen opted to persevere with a strong even pace. The move paid dividends as he overtook Rotich in the final stages and was first past the post in a course record, earning him 45,000€ in prize money.

He was runner-up for a third time at the 2008 Hamburg Marathon and although his time of 2:07:48 was quick, it was some 25 seconds behind the winner David Mandago. He tried to defend his Frankfurt title for a third time but was beaten by Robert Kiprono Cheruiyot, who broke Kigen's course record on his marathon debut.

He set a different target in 2009, aiming to win the Düsseldorf Marathon in a course record time. However, it was not to be as David Langat beat him to the finish and Kigen was almost two minutes off the record with a time of 2:11:30. Running a time of 2:09:22, he finally topped the podium at the Hamburg Marathon in 2010 after numerous attempts. He came 17th at the 2011 Frankfurt Marathon and then only seventh at the lower-profile Zürich Marathon in 2012.

== Achievements ==
- All results regarding marathon, unless stated otherwise

Year	Competition	Venue	Position	Notes
Representing Kenya
2004	Hamburg Marathon	Hamburg, Germany	5th	2:11:52
2004	Amsterdam Marathon	Amsterdam, Netherlands	4th	2:12:05
2005	Hamburg Marathon	Hamburg, Germany	2nd	2:09:18
2005	Frankfurt Marathon	Frankfurt, Germany	1st	2:08:29
2006	Hamburg Marathon	Hamburg, Germany	4th	2:10:00
2006	Frankfurt Marathon	Frankfurt, Germany	1st	2:09:06
2007	Hamburg Marathon	Hamburg, Germany	2nd	2:07:33
2007	Frankfurt Marathon	Frankfurt, Germany	1st	2:07:58
2008	Hamburg Marathon	Hamburg, Germany	2nd	2:07:48
2009	Düsseldorf Marathon	Düsseldorf, Germany	2nd	2:11:30
2010	Hamburg Marathon	Hamburg, Germany	1st	2:09:22
2011	Frankfurt Marathon	Frankfurt, Germany	17th	2:10:17
2012	Zürich Marathon	Zürich, Switzerland	7th	2:14:47
2012	Frankfurt Marathon	Frankfurt, Germany	12th	2:12:26
2013	Hannover Marathon	Hannover, Germany	6th	2:13:41
2014	Stockholm Marathon	Stockholm, Sweden	5th	2:15:28

== Personal bests ==
Event	Time (h:m:s)	Venue	Date
Marathon	2:07:33	Hamburg, Germany	29 April 2007

- All information taken from IAAF profile.
