= Martín Mondragón =

Mexican long-distance runner

Martín Mondragón (born November 11, 1953) is a retired long-distance runner from Mexico, who won the 1988 edition of the Los Angeles Marathon. Virtually unknown before the race, the 34-year-old set the course record and his personal record at 2:10:19 after a battle with Mark Plaatjes, which positioned the L.A. Marathon amongst the top marathons worldwide.

He represented his native country at the 1988 Summer Olympics in Seoul, South Korea, where he finished in 57th place in the men's marathon, clocking 2:27:10.

He continued running into the masters division, winning the Virginia 10 Miler in 1995, and the Boilermaker Road Race three times in the late 1990s.

== Achievements ==
Year	Competition	Venue	Position	Event	Notes
Representing Mexico
1988	Los Angeles Marathon	Los Angeles, United States	1st	Marathon	2:10:19
1988	Olympic Games	Seoul, South Korea	57th	Marathon	2:27:10
