= Birhanu Gedefa =

Ethiopian long-distance runner

Personal information
- Nationality: Ethiopian
- Born: Birhanu Gedefa; March 16, 1984 (age 42) Ethiopia
- Occupation: Long-distance runner
- Years active: 2011–present

Sport
- Country: Ethiopia
- Sport: Athletics
- Event: Marathon

Achievements and titles
- Personal best(s): Marathon: 2:08:03 (Houston, 2015)

Birhanu Gedefa (born 16 March 1984) is an Ethiopian long-distance runner specializing in the marathon. He is notable for winning the Houston Marathon in 2015 and for being retroactively declared the 2016 champion of the same event due to doping disqualifications of the original top finishers.

== Career ==
Gedefa began his international career around 2011. His breakthrough came at the 2015 Houston Marathon, which he won in a personal best time of 2:08:03.

The following year, Gedefa was officially awarded the 2016 Houston Marathon title. This came after Gebo Burka Gameda and Girmay Birhanu Gebru, who originally finished first and second, respectively, were disqualified for anti-doping rule violations by the IAAF and USADA. Gedefa, who had initially placed third, was then recognized as the winner with an official time of 2:11:53.

== Personal best ==
- Marathon: 2:08:03 – Houston, United States, 18 January 2015
