= Brimin Kipkorir =

Kenyan marathon runner

Personal information
- Born: May 25, 1989 (age 37) Kapkitony, Keiyo South, Kenya

Sport
- Country: Kenya
- Sport: Athletics
- Event: Long-distance running

Brimin Kipkorir (born 25 May 1989) is a Kenyan long-distance runner specializing in marathon events. He has won several major international marathons, including the Frankfurt Marathon and Sydney Marathon, and set multiple course records. However, he is currently under provisional suspension due to a doping violation.

== Early life ==
Kipkorir was born in Kapkitony, Keiyo South, Kenya. Before fully committing to athletics, he worked as a farmer in his village.

== Career ==
Kipkorir's marathon career has been marked by consistent performances and major victories:

- 2018 – Won the Athens Classic Marathon in 2:10:57.
- 2017 & 2019 – Won the Nairobi Standard Chartered Marathon.
- 2022 & 2023 – Won the Frankfurt Marathon, setting a personal best of 2:04:53 in 2023.
- 2024 – Set a course record at the Sydney Marathon, finishing in 2:06:18.
- 2024 – Won the Taipei Marathon in 2:11:41.

== Doping Suspension ==
In February 2025, the Athletics Integrity Unit (AIU) provisionally suspended Kipkorir after he tested positive for EPO and furosemide. The sample was collected during an out-of-competition test on 22 November 2024.

== Personal Bests ==
- Marathon – 2:04:53 (Frankfurt, 2023)

== Achievements ==
Representing Kenya
Year	Competition	Venue	Position	Event	Notes
2017	Nairobi Standard Chartered Marathon	Nairobi, Kenya	1st	Marathon	2:12:39
2018	Athens Classic Marathon	Athens, Greece	1st	Marathon	2:10:57
2019	Nairobi Standard Chartered Marathon	Nairobi, Kenya	1st	Marathon	2:10:43
2022	Frankfurt Marathon	Frankfurt, Germany	1st	Marathon	2:06:11
2023	Frankfurt Marathon	Frankfurt, Germany	1st	Marathon	2:04:53 (Personal Best)
2024	Sydney Marathon	Sydney, Australia	1st	Marathon	2:06:18 (Course Record)
2024	Taipei Marathon	Taipei, Taiwan	1st	Marathon	2:11:41
