= 1977 Chicago Marathon =

Footrace held in Chicago, Illinois

1st Chicago Marathon
- Venue: Chicago, United States
- Dates: September 25

Champions
- Men: Dan Cloeter (2:17:52)
- Women: Dorothy Doolittle (2:50:47)

The 1977 Chicago Marathon was the first running of the annual marathon race in Chicago, United States and was held on September 25. The elite men's and women's races were won by Americans Dan Cloeter (2:17:52 hours) and Dorothy Doolittle (2:50:47). A total of 2128 runners finished the race. It marked a return of a full marathon race to the city, following on from the Windy City Marathon of the 1960s.

== Results ==
=== Men ===
Position	Athlete	Nationality	Time
1st place, gold medalist(s)	Dan Cloeter	United States	2:17:52
2nd place, silver medalist(s)	Jim Macnider	United States	2:22:49
3rd place, bronze medalist(s)	Dave Elger	United States	2:25:25
4	Steven Flanagan	United States	2:26:47
5	Gary Barrett	United States	2:27:41
6	Walter Crawford	United States	2:28:00
7	Patrick Davis	United States	2:30:18
8	Ken Burke	United States	2:30:30
9	Roger Rouiller	United States	2:31:58
10	William Van Dyke	United States	2:32:49

=== Women ===
Position	Athlete	Nationality	Time
1st place, gold medalist(s)	Dorothy Doolittle	United States	2:50:47
2nd place, silver medalist(s)	Marilyn Bevans	United States	2:54:56
3rd place, bronze medalist(s)	Lynn Johnson	United States	2:58:53
4	Cheryl Flanagan	United States	2:58:53
5	Penny DeMoss	United States	3:10:37
6	Ellen O'Malley	United States	3:11:04
7	Sue Ellen Trapp	United States	3:14:09
8	Mary Burns	United States	3:15:31
9	Diana McIntosh	United States	3:30:36
10	Andrea Arena	United States	3:33:42
