= Maseepho =

- Community Council
- Geographic Center of Community
- Coordinates: 30°00′46″S 28°32′47″E
- Country: Lesotho
- District: Qacha's Nek District
- Elevation: 7,799 ft (2,377 m)

Population (2006)
  - Total: 7,879
- Time zone: UTC+2 (CAT)
- Coordinates computed from Lesotho Villages file.

Maseepho is a community council located in the Qacha's Nek District of Lesotho. Its population in 2006 was 7,879.

== Villages ==
The community of Maseepho includes the villages of Ha Khophocho, Ha Lesala, Ha Mahabe, Ha Mapote, Ha Mohlapiso (Likonyeleng), Ha Mokhele, Ha Montši (Ha Rapase), Ha Phatela, Ha Pheello, Ha Ramatlama, Ha Ranqhongoana, Ha Rapase, Ha Ratšiu, Ha Sebata, Ha Seteleng (Ha Abisae), Ha Seteleng (Thotaneng), Ha Thiba-There, Liphakoeng, Maseepho (Lirotong), Maseepho (Moeeng), Mesitsaneng, Mosututsoana and Mosututsoana (Ntšupeng).
