= Vicoty Chepngeno =

Kenyan long-distance runner

Personal information
- Nationality: Kenyan
- Born: November 12, 1993 (age 32)

Sport
- Sport: Athletics
- Events: Long-distance running (10K, Half Marathon, Marathon)

Vicoty Chepngeno (born 12 November 1993) is a Kenyan long-distance runner who specializes in road races, including the 10K, half marathon, and marathon.

== Career ==
In August 2019, Chepngeno claimed victory at the News and Sentinel Half Marathon, setting a new course record of 1:10:18.

She also won the half marathon at the Columbus Marathon in both 2018 (1:12:38) and 2019 (1:10:24). Chepngeno is notably a three-time winner of the Philadelphia Half Marathon, including a winning time of 1:07:22 in one edition.

In January 2022, Chepngeno won the Aramco Houston Half Marathon with a time of 1:05:03. This performance set a North American all-comers' record and placed her 11th on the world all-time list for the half marathon at the time.

In February 2022, she achieved a personal best in the 10K road race, clocking 30:14 in Castellón, Spain.

Chepngeno recorded a personal best in the marathon with a time of 2:19:55 at the Chevron Houston Marathon in January 2024, finishing second. In November 2024, she claimed victory at the prestigious Beijing Marathon with a time of 2:21:56, leading a Kenyan and Ethiopian podium sweep. She also won the Monterey Bay Half Marathon later that year, finishing in 1:08:03.

== Personal bests ==
As of May 2025, Chepngeno's personal bests are:

- 10K Road – 30:14 (Castellón, 27 February 2022)
- Half Marathon – 1:05:03 (Houston, 16 January 2022)
- Marathon – 2:19:55 (Houston, 14 January 2024)
