= Biruktayit Degefa =

Ethiopian long-distance runner

Personal information
- Nationality: USA
- Born: Biruktayit Eshetu Degefa; 29 September 1990 (age 35) Mojo, Ethiopia
- Occupation: long-distance runner
- Years active: 2014–present

Sport
- Country: United States
- Sport: Long-distance running
- Events: Marathon, Half marathon, 10K Road

Achievements and titles
- Personal bests: Marathon: 2:21:34 (Valencia, 4 December 2022); Half marathon: 1:09:41 (Berlin, 2 October 2022); 10 Kilometres Road: 31:23 (Cooper River, 2 April 2022)

Biruktayit Eshetu Degefa (born 29 September 1990) is an American long-distance runner specialising in the marathon and half marathon. She is best known for her three victories at the Houston Marathon and holds a marathon personal best of 2:21:34.

== Career ==
Degefa began competing internationally on the road in the mid-2010s, quickly marking herself with major wins. In 2014, she claimed her first title at the Sydney Marathon in Australia, finishing in 2:29:42.

Her association with the Houston Marathon started in 2016, when she won in 2:26:07. After placing second in 2017 (2:30:44), she reclaimed the title in 2018 (2:24:51) and successfully defended it in 2019 with a then–personal best of 2:23:28. She became only the third woman in the race's history to win three titles.

In 2022, Degefa ran 31:23 for 10 km at the Cooper River Bridge Run in April and set a half-marathon best of 1:09:41 in Berlin in October. She then lowered her marathon PB to 2:21:34 at the Valencia Marathon in December, finishing 11th in a deep field.

== Personal bests ==
- Marathon: 2:21:34 (Valencia, 4 December 2022)
- Half marathon: 1:09:41 (Berlin, 2 October 2022)
- 10 Kilometres Road: 31:23 (Cooper River, 2 April 2022)

== Achievements ==
Year	Competition	Venue	Position	Time
2014	Sydney Marathon	Sydney, Australia	1st	2:29:42
2016	Houston Marathon	Houston, United States	1st	2:26:07
2017	Houston Marathon	Houston, United States	2nd	2:30:44
2018	Houston Marathon	Houston, United States	1st	2:24:51
2019	Houston Marathon	Houston, United States	1st	2:23:28
