= 1982 Chicago Marathon =

Footrace held in Chicago, Illinois

6th Chicago Marathon
- Venue: Chicago, United States
- Dates: September 26

Champions
- Men: Greg Meyer (2:11:00)
- Women: Nancy Conz (2:33:24)

The 1982 Chicago Marathon was the sixth running of the annual marathon race in Chicago, United States and was held on September 26. The elite men's and women's races were won by Americans Greg Meyer (2:11:00 hours) and Nancy Conz (2:33:24). A total of 4642 runners finished the race, an increase of nearly 400 from the previous year.

== Results ==
=== Men ===
Position	Athlete	Nationality	Time
1st place, gold medalist(s)	Greg Meyer	United States	2:11:00
2nd place, silver medalist(s)	Joseph Nzau	Kenya	2:11:40
3rd place, bronze medalist(s)	John Halberstadt	South Africa	2:11:46
4	Dave Edge	Canada	2:12:25
5	Randy Thomas	United States	2:12:33
6	Giampaolo Messina	Italy	2:12:42
7	Ed Mendoza	United States	2:12:47
8	Karel Lismont	Belgium	2:13:02
9	Duncan Macdonald	United States	2:13:07
10	Michael Hurd	United Kingdom	2:13:17
11	Michael Pinocci	United States	2:14:28
12	Mark Spilsbury	United States	2:15:30
13	Henry O'Connell	United States	2:16:33
14	Håkan Spik	Finland	2:16:50
15	David Chettle	Australia	2:17:15
16	Craig Virgin	United States	2:17:30
17	Joseph Sheeran	United States	2:17:47
18	Pablo Vigil	United States	2:18:14
19	Ian Thompson	United Kingdom	2:18:59
20	Greg Gawlik	United States	2:19:18

=== Women ===
Position	Athlete	Nationality	Time
1st place, gold medalist(s)	Nancy Conz	United States	2:33:24
2nd place, silver medalist(s)	Karen Dunn	United States	2:34:41
3rd place, bronze medalist(s)	Glenys Quick	New Zealand	2:36:50
4	Eileen Claugus	United States	2:37:16
5	Shirley Finken	United States	2:41:16
6	Cindy Dalrymple	United States	2:43:35
7	Tina Gandy	United States	2:44:06
8	Janice Arenz	United States	2:44:51
9	Beverly Miller	United States	2:46:50
10	Charlene Groet	United States	2:48:15
11	Karen Bukowski	United States	2:52:24
12	Susan Crowe	United States	2:54:23
