= Tania Chavez Moser =

Bolivian athletics competitor

Personal information
- Born: 6 May 1990 (age 35)

Sport
- Country: Bolivia
- Sport: Athletics

Tania Chavez Moser (born 6 May 1990) is a Bolivian athletics competitor. In 2020, she competed in the women's half marathon at the 2020 World Athletics Half Marathon Championships held in Gdynia, Poland.

In 2019, she competed in the women's 3000 metres steeplechase event at the 2019 Pan American Games held in Lima, Peru.
