= Hailemaryam Kiros =

Ethiopian long-distance runner

Personal information
- Born: 5 February 1997 (age 29)

Sport
- Country: Ethiopia
- Sport: Athletics
- Event: Long-distance running
Medal record
World Marathon Majors
Gold medal – first place	2025 Sydney	Marathon

Hailemaryam Kiros (born 5 February 1997) is an Ethiopian long-distance runner. In 2020, he competed in the men's race at the 2020 World Athletics Half Marathon Championships held in Gdynia, Poland. His personal best in the marathon is 2:04:41, set in Paris in 2021.
