= Sydney Marathon =

Annual race in Australia held since 2000

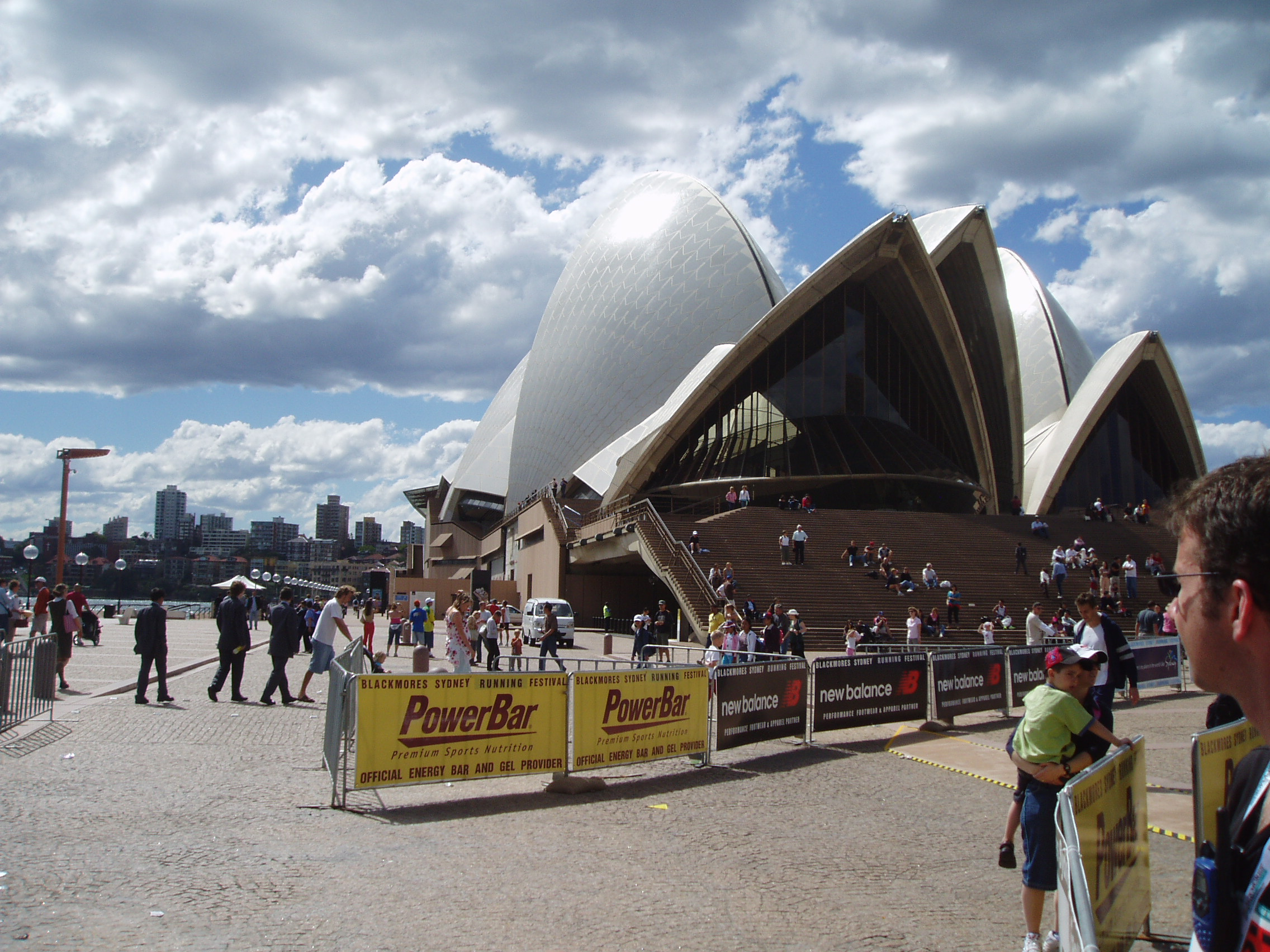
- Sydney Opera House near the finish line in 2005
- Date: Late August
- Location: Sydney, Australia
- Event type: Road
- Distance: Marathon (also 10 km, 4.2 km)
- Primary sponsor: TCS and ASICS
- Established: 2001 (25 years ago)
- Course records: Men's: 2:04:42 (2026) (Ethiopia) Addisu Gobena; Women's: 2:18:22 (2025) (Netherlands) Sifan Hassan
- Website: Sydney Marathon
- Participants: 32,964 finishers (2025)
- 2026 Sydney Marathon

The Sydney Marathon is a marathon held annually in Sydney, Australia. The event was first held on the 30th of April 2000 and called The Host City Marathon as a test event for the Sydney 2000 Olympic Games, and has continued every year since, as a legacy of the 2000 Summer Olympics. The marathon is categorized as a Platinum Label Road Race by World Athletics. Previously held in the middle of September, the race moved to late August from 2025, as part of its elevation to the World Marathon Majors.

The Sydney Marathon also includes a 5 km (3.1 mi) race.

== History ==
The Sydney Marathon started in April 2000, following the same course as the marathon during the 2000 Summer Olympics. The women's race in 2001 was won by Krishna Stanton, who had never run a marathon before, and was doing the event as a result of a challenge from a friend.

In 2014 the marathon was awarded a Silver Label Road Race by the International Association of Athletics Federations (IAAF), then in December 2014 the race was awarded a Gold Label Road Race in time for the 2015 race and it is now a Platinum Label Road Race.

The 2020 in-person edition of the race was cancelled due to the coronavirus pandemic, with all entries automatically transferred to 2021, and all registrants given the option of also running the race virtually for free. (Note: Before being cancelled, it was postponed to 8 November 2020, with all registrants given the option of obtaining a 75% refund or transferring their entry to another runner or to 2021.) Moses Kibet won the 2022 race in 2:07:02, a new course record, and the fastest marathon time run on Australian soil.

In July 2022, organisers of the race announced that they were applying to be added to the list of World Marathon Majors. Following two consecutive successful assessments as a candidate race, the marathon was elevated to the series on 4 November 2024, and ran its first race as a World Marathon Major on 31 August 2025. The 2025 Sydney Marathon produced the fastest times ever recorded in Australia in both the men's and women's events, with Hailemaryam Kiros beating the previous record set by Brimin Kipkorir in 2024 by 12 seconds, and Sifan Hassan beating Workenesh Edesa's 2024 time by over four minutes.

== Course ==
The marathon course initially followed the same course that was used in the 2000 Summer Olympics.

In 2010 the marathon course was changed to flatten it out which, according to the organisers, makes it "a faster, more scenic and spectator friendly course."

The marathon runs on a point-to-point course that begins in North Sydney, crosses over the Sydney Harbour Bridge, runs through Pyrmont and The Rocks, down Oxford Street and Anzac Parade towards Kingsford, before returning to the city via Moore Park and Centennial Park, ending in front of the Sydney Opera House.

== Other awards ==
To date, eight runners have competed in every Sydney Marathon, and have been dubbed "Blue Line Legends".

In addition, runners who have completed at least 10 marathons are eligible to be inducted into the Bridge Club. (Note: The marathons do not have to be run on consecutive years.)

== Other races ==
In addition to the marathon, a 5 kilometres (3.1 mi) "Mini Marathon" are also held as part of the event. The "Mini Marathon" is run the day before the full marathon, and also finishes at the Sydney Opera House.

The event also featured a half marathon and a 10 km distance, which were last run in 2023 and 2025 respectively. Both distances were removed as part of Sydney's candidacy and eventual entry into the World Marathon Majors.
