= Dan Cloeter =

Dan Cloeter (born May 16, 1952) is a retired athlete and current pastor in Osceola, Nebraska. While attending Concordia University Nebraska, Cloeter was forty-eighth at the 1972 Amateur Athletic Union Cross Country Championships and seventh at the 1973 NAIA Men's Cross Country Championship. Between 1973 and 1981, Cloeter competed in American marathons including multiple appearances at the Chicago Marathon. Cloeter won the 1977 event, then known as the Mayor Daley Marathon, and was third in 1978. He won again in 1979, the year the marathon's name was changed to the America's Marathon-Chicago.

Apart from Chicago, Cloeter was twenty-fourth at the marathon during the 1976 United States Olympic Trials and eighteenth at the 1978 New York City Marathon. Outside of running, Cloeter began his religious career working for Lutheran churches in 1978. Between the 1980s and 2010s, Cloeter primarily held pastoral positions in Nebraska while working in various cities of Midwestern United States. During this time period, Cloeter was chosen to hold the opening ceremonial prayer at the 1999 USATF Junior Olympics.

== Early life and education ==
Cloeter was born on May 16, 1952, and grew up in Milwaukee, Wisconsin, until he was ten years old. During his high school education in Seward, Nebraska, Cloeter began running. For his post-secondary education, Cloeter attended Concordia University Nebraska between 1970 and 1974. During this time period, Cloeter competed at cross country championships held by the Amateur Athletic Union and National Association of Intercollegiate Athletics. In these championships, Cloeter was forty-eighth at the 1972 AAU Cross Country Championships and seventh at the 1973 NAIA Men's Cross Country Championship.

In 1975, Cloeter continued his post-secondary education at Concordia Theological Seminary in Springfield, Illinois, and worked at J. C. Penney. During the late 1970s, Cloeter went to Fort Wayne, Indiana, where the seminary had subsequently relocated, to complete additional studies and worked as a gym teacher.

== Athletic career ==
From 1973 to 1982, Cloeter ran primarily in American races ranging from the ten kilometers to marathon. When the Mayor Daley Marathon premiered in 1977, Cloeter won the event with a time of 2:17:52. The following year, Cloeter was third at the event. When the event was renamed to the America's Marathon-Chicago in 1979, Cloeter won the event in 2:23:20. After the event, Cloeter received medical treatment for dehydration. The following year, Cloeter stated he would not compete at the 1980 Chicago Marathon due to leg injuries he had sustained from a dog.

Outside of Chicago, Cloeter was 18th at the 1978 New York City Marathon. Competing in the 1976 United States Olympic Trials, Cloeter was 24th in the marathon event. Four years later, Cloeter qualified to participate at the 1980 United States Olympic Trials. After the United States decided not to attend the 1980 Summer Olympics, Cloeter pulled out of the Olympic Trials. Apart from the United States, Cloeter appeared at racing events in Bermuda, Puerto Rico, and The Bahamas before his last marathon in 1981.

== Religious career ==
While competing in running, Cloeter began working at Lutheran churches in 1978. Between the late 1970s and early 1980s, Cloeter was a minister and assistant pastor at a church in Norfolk, Nebraska. In 1982, it was announced that Cloeter would continue his religious career in Racine, Wisconsin. During this decade, Cloeter initially stayed in Wisconsin until he took a pastoral position in Hutchinson, Minnesota, in the late 1980s. At the beginning of the 1990s, Cloeter remained in Hutchinson. By the end of the 1990s, Cloeter had moved to Omaha, Nebraska, to continue his pastoral experience. While in Omaha, Cloeter was selected to give the opening ceremonial prayer at the 1999 USATF Junior Olympics.

In the 2000s, Cloeter stayed in Omaha until he began pastor at a congregation in Ann Arbor, Michigan, in 2002. After he stepped down from his senior pastor's position in 2004, Cloeter worked for a San Antonio, Texas, financial company until 2006. In 2007, Cloeter and his wife moved to Lincoln, Nebraska, to open up a church. For the majority of the 2010s, Cloeter continued to work in as a pastor in Osceola, Nebraska, after starting there in 2012.

== Honors and personal life ==
In 1994, Cloeter was inducted into an athletic hall of fame for Concordia University Nebraska. Cloeter is married and has four children.
