= Addisu Gobena =

Ethiopian long-distance runner and marathon debut winner

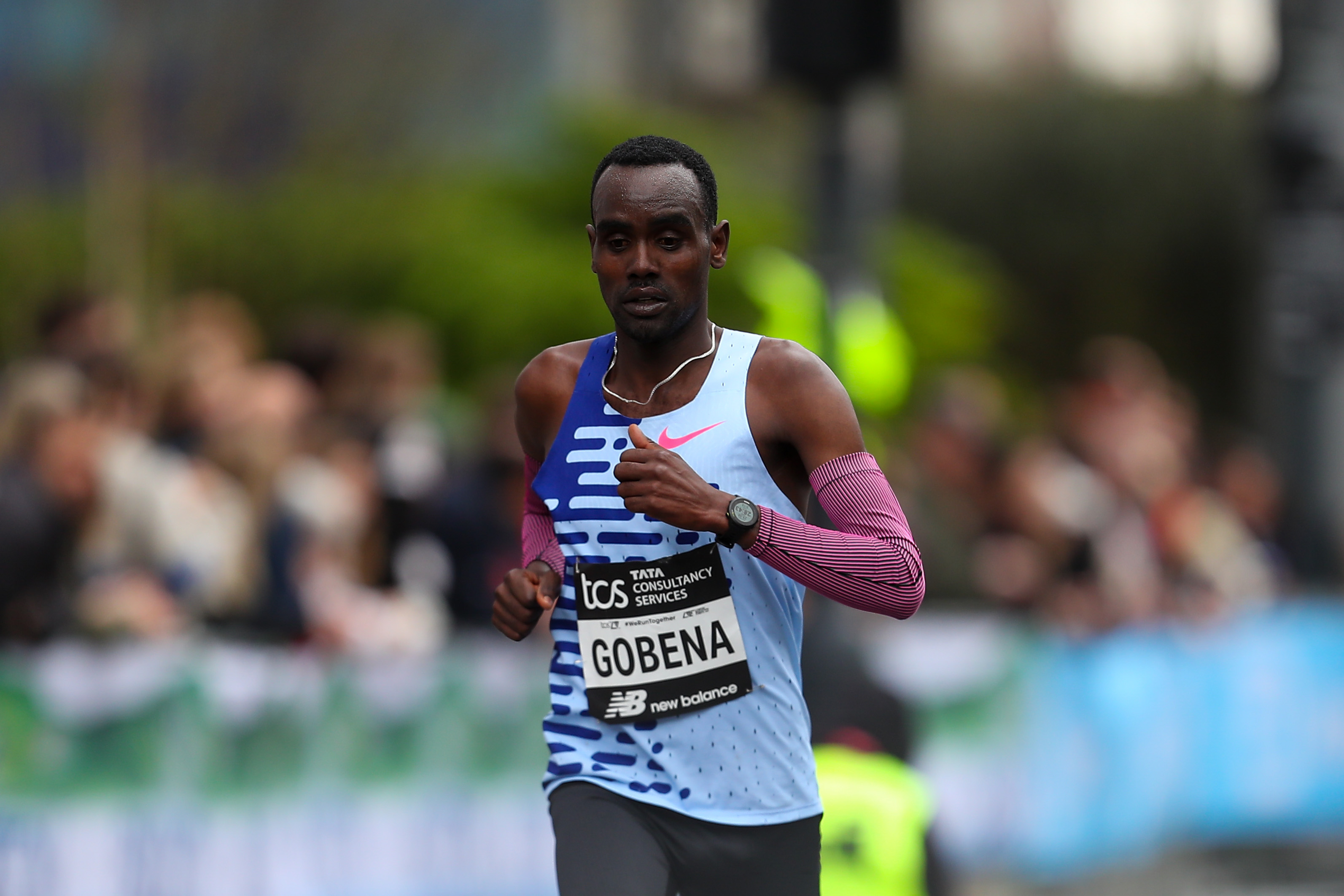
- Addisu Gobena (2024 London Marathon)

Personal information
- Nationality: Ethiopian
- Born: 20 October 2004 (age 21)

Sport
- Sport: Athletics
- Events: Long-distance running, Marathon

Addisu Gobena (born 20 October 2004) is an Ethiopian long-distance runner who competes in road races, including the marathon and half marathon. He gained significant international attention after winning the 2024 Dubai Marathon on his debut over the distance, marking him as a promising new talent in the sport. Gobena is the nephew of elite marathoner Ruti Aga, who has played a crucial role in inspiring his transition from javelin to distance running.

== Career ==
Addisu Gobena's athletic journey began with javelin throwing, followed by a period competing in 400m and 800m races. He eventually transitioned to long-distance running, a decision significantly influenced by the guidance of his aunt, Ruti Aga, an accomplished marathon runner.

In October 2023, he achieved his first notable international result in distance running, placing third at the Vedanta Delhi Half Marathon.

His breakthrough came on 7 January 2024, when he made a stunning debut in the marathon distance at the Dubai Marathon. Gobena won the race in a remarkable time of 2:05:01, leading an Ethiopian podium sweep and establishing himself as a formidable presence in marathon running.

Later in 2024, he participated in the 2024 New York City Marathon, where he finished 21st with a time of 2:14:12.

Continuing his strong form into the new year, in January 2025, Gobena secured victory at the Aramco Houston Half Marathon. He recorded a time of 59:17 in a dramatic sprint finish, an identical time to American runner Conner Mantz, who set a new U.S. record.

== Personal life ==
Born in Ethiopia, Addisu Gobena's athletic career has been significantly shaped by his family connections. He is the nephew of renowned marathon specialist Ruti Aga, whose mentorship was instrumental in his decision to shift from javelin throwing to focusing on long-distance running.

== Personal bests ==
- Marathon – 2:04:42 (Sydney, 30 August 2026)
- Half Marathon – 59:17 (Houston, 19 January 2025)
