= Balkan Marathon Championships =

The Balkan Marathon Championships is an annual road running competition over the marathon distance (42.195 km) between athletes from member nations of Balkan Athletics. It is one of two road running championships for the region, alongside the Balkan Half Marathon Championships (established in 2012).

Following an unofficial gathering of Balkan athletes in 1929, the Balkan Marathon Championship was formally established within the Balkan Athletics Championships in 1930. It was a men's competition exclusively until 1990, when a women's race was also added. The marathon event was separated from the track and field competition in 1996 and was established as an annual competition in its own right. The competition has not been held every year since, though it has been consistently held as an annual fixture from 2009 onwards. The venue varies each year and the championship is usually contested within an independently organised marathon in a city in the Balkans. A national team aspect was included in the competition in 2019.

Turkey is historically the most successful nation in the men's race, followed by Greece, while Serbia has produced the most female winners. Individually, Franjo Škrinjar of Yugoslavia has won the most titles with six and Serbia's Olivera Jevtić has the title of most successful woman with four wins.

== List of winners ==
Edition	Year	Men's winner	Time (h:m:s)	Women's winner	Time (h:m:s)
-	1929	Christos Sarras (GRE)	3:12:32	Not held	
1st	1930	Nicolae Ilie (ROM)	3:14:05	Not held	
2nd	1931	Christos Sarras (GRE)	3:11:21	Not held	
3rd	1932	Ludovic Gall (ROM)	3:20:41	Not held	
4th	1933	Ludovic Gall (ROM)	3:02:41	Not held	
5th	1934	Stylianos Kyriakides (GRE)	2:49:42	Not held	
6th	1935	Ludovic Gall (ROM)	3:07:40	Not held	
7th	1936	Stylianos Kyriakides (GRE)	2:49:10	Not held	
8th	1937	Stylianos Kyriakides (GRE)	3:02:22	Not held	
9th	1938	Athanasios Ragazos (GRE)	2:30:38	Not held	
10th	1939	Stylianos Kyriakides (GRE)	2:52:07	Not held	
11th	1940	Athanasios Ragazos (GRE)	2:44:37	Not held	
12th	1953	Franjo Škrinjar (YUG)	3:09:46	Not held	
13th	1954	Franjo Škrinjar (YUG)	2:48:49	Not held	
14th	1955	Haydar Erturan (TUR)	2:51:34	Not held	
15th	1956	Franjo Mihalić (YUG)	2:16:25	Not held	
16th	1957	Franjo Škrinjar (YUG)	2:41:37	Not held	
17th	1958	Franjo Škrinjar (YUG)	2:41:06	Not held	
18th	1959	Franjo Škrinjar (YUG)	2:33:17	Not held	
19th	1960	Dobrivoje Stojanović (YUG)	2:29:12	Not held	
20th	1961	Franjo Škrinjar (YUG)	2:33:18	Not held	
21st	1962	Ivan Mustapić (YUG)	2:36:43	Not held	
22nd	1963	Ivan Mustapić (YUG)	2:32:31	Not held	
23rd	1964	Constantin Grecescu (ROM)	2:28:24	Not held	
24th	1965	Ivaylo Sharankov (BUL)	2:39:50	Not held	
25th	1966	İsmail Akçay (TUR)	2:22:45	Not held	
26th	1967	Ivaylo Sharankov (BUL)	2:24:52	Not held	
27th	1968	İsmail Akçay (TUR)	2:21:56	Not held	
28th	1969	Nedo Farčić (YUG)	2:26:18	Not held	
29th	1970	Hüseyin Aktaş (TUR)	2:27:51	Not held	
30th	1971	İsmail Akçay (TUR)	2:25:36	Not held	
31st	1972	Hüseyin Aktaş (TUR)	2:20:09	Not held	
32nd	1973	İsmail Akçay (TUR) Hüseyin Aktaş (TUR)	2:30:35	Not held	
33rd	1974	Atanas Galabov (BUL)	2:30:37	Not held	
34th	1975	Atanas Galabov (BUL)	2:28:21	Not held	
35th	1976	Hüseyin Aktaş (TUR)	2:33:53	Not held	
36th	1977	Veli Balli (TUR)	2:22:56	Not held	
37th	1978	Vasil Lechev (BUL)	2:24:20	Not held	
38th	1979	Michalis Kousis (GRE)	2:21:20	Not held	
39th	1980	Dimitrios Psathas (GRE)	2:25:43	Not held	
40th	1981	Michalis Kousis (GRE)	2:19:06	Not held	
41st	1982	Gheorghe Buruiană (ROM)	2:31:47	Not held	
42nd	1983	Mehmet Terzi (TUR)	2:19:51	Not held	
43rd	1984	Mehmet Terzi (TUR)	2:21:30	Not held	
44th	1985	Tomislav Ašković (YUG)	2:25:21	Not held	
45th	1986	Mehmet Terzi (TUR)	2:22:11	Not held	
46th	1988	Mehmet Terzi (TUR)	2:23:00	Not held	
47th	1989	Christos Papachristos (GRE)	2:27:07	Not held	
48th	1990	Haydar Dogan (TUR)	2:22:50	Maria Polyzou (GRE)	2:55:25
49th	1992	Cihangir Demirel (TUR)	2:23:47	Rumyana Panovska (BUL)	2:46:51
50th	1996	Nikolaos Polias (GRE)	2:18:43	Suzana Ćirić (YUG)	2:37:06
51st	1997	Spyros Andriopoulos (GRE)	2:13:15	Panayota Nikolakopoulou (GRE)	2:44:24
52nd	1998	Nikolaos Polias (GRE)	2:17:02	Gergana Voynova (BUL)	2:46:54
53rd	1999	Petko Stefanov (BUL)	2:21:10	Rumyana Panovska (BUL)	2:55:14
54th	2000	Petko Stefanov (BUL)	2:19:30	Cristina Pomacu (ROM)	2:36:54
55th	2001	Sreten Ninković (YUG)	2:18:22	Mehtap Doğan-Sızmaz (TUR)	2:39:13
56th	2002	Arthur Miklos (ROM)	2:23:20	Svetlana Tcaci (MDA)	2:37:57
57th	2005	Iaroslav Mușinschi (MDA)	2:20:42	Natalia Cercheș (MDA)	2:42:58
58th	2006	Yusuf Zepak (TUR)	2:29:35	Ekaterini Fotopoulou (GRE)	3:15:30
59th	2009	Roman Prodius (MDA)	2:14:57	Olivera Jevtić (SRB)	2:31:18
60th	2010	Ercan Muslu (TUR)	2:24:12	Paula Todoran (ROU)	2:44:23
61st	2011	Mehmet Ali Akbas (TUR)	2:37:16	Slađana Perunović (MNE)	2:53:15
62nd	2012	Ercan Muslu (TUR)	2:28:15	Esra Güllü (TUR)	2:57:08
63rd	2013	Yolo Nikolov (BUL)	2:19:31	Slađana Perunović (MNE)	2:42:28
64th	2014	Vitalie Gheorghiță (MDA)	2:31:24	Ana Subotić (SRB)	2:44:04
65th	2015	Darko Živanović (SRB)	2:23:05	Olivera Jevtić (SRB)	2:39:32
66th	2016	Shaban Mustafa (BUL)	2:29:59	Slađana Perunović (MNE)	2:49:20
67th	2017	Yavuz Ağralı (TUR)	2:18:22	Olivera Jevtić (SRB)	2:35:31
68th	2018	Anatoliy Bondarenko (UKR)	2:38:58	Olivera Jevtić (SRB)	2:44:26
69th	2019	Maxim Răileanu (MDA)	2:21:11	Teodora Simović (SRB)	2:42:30
