= 2018 in the sport of athletics =

2018 in athletics
- Major world events: 2018 IAAF World Indoor Championships

In 2018, no world outdoor athletics championships was held. Major events held during the year included the 2018 IAAF World Indoor Championships, 2018 IAAF Continental Cup, 2018 IAAF World Race Walking Team Championships, and 2018 IAAF World Half Marathon Championships.

== Major championships ==
=== World ===
- IAAF World Indoor Championships
- IAAF World U20 Championships
- IAAF Continental Cup
- IAAF Diamond League
- Summer Youth Olympics
- Athletics World Cup
- World Marathon Majors
- World Half Marathon Championships
- IAAF World Race Walking Cup
- WMRA World Mountain Running Championships
- World University Cross Country Championships

=== Regional ===
- African Championships
- Asian Indoor Championships
- Asian Junior Championships
- Asian Race Walking Championships
- Asian Games
- Central American and Caribbean Games
- Central American Championships
- Commonwealth Games
- European Athletics Championships
- European Athletics U18 Championships
- European Cross Country Championships
- European Throwing Cup
- European Cup 10,000m
- European Mountain Running Championships
- European Team Championships
- Ibero-American Championships
- Mediterranean U23 Championships
- Micronesian Games
- NACAC Cross Country Championships
- South American Games
- South American U23 Championships
- South American Cross Country Championships
- South Asian Games
- South Asian Junior Championships
- Oceania Athletics Championships
- Oceania Cross Country Championships

== World records ==
=== Indoor ===
Event	Athlete	Nation	Result	Location	Date
Men's 60 metres	Christian Coleman	United States	6.34	Albuquerque, New Mexico	18 February 2018
Men's 400 metres	Michael Norman	United States	44.52 (Note: This performance was not officially ratified as NCAA anti-doping procedures do not meet international standards)	College Station, Texas	10 March 2018
Men's 4 × 400 metres relay	Karol Zalewski; Rafal Omelko; Lukasz Krawczuk; Jakub Krzewina	Poland	3:01.77	Birmingham, United Kingdom	4 March 2018
Men's 4 × 400 metres relay	Ilolo Izu; Robert Grant; Devin Dixon; Mylik Kerley	United States (Texas A&M)	3:01.39	College Station, Texas	10 March 2018
Men's 4 × 800 metres relay	Joseph McAsey; Kyle Merber; Chris Giesting; Jesse Garn	United States	7:11.30	Boston, United States	25 February 2018
Women's 4 × 800 metres relay	Chrishuna Williams; Raevyn Rogers; Charlene Lipsey; Ajeé Wilson	United States	8:05.89	New York City, United States	3 February 2018

=== Outdoor ===
Event	Athlete	Nation	Result	Location	Date
Men's 50,000 metres (track)	Tyler Andrews	United States	2:46:06.80 (Note: The 50,000 metres (track) is not a recognised event for record purposes, however, this represents the world's best performance)	Santa Barbara, California	13 April 2018
Men's half marathon	Abraham Kiptum	Kenya	58:18	Valencia, Spain	28 October 2018
Men's marathon	Eliud Kipchoge	Kenya	2:01:39	Berlin, Germany	16 September 2018
Men's 100 kilometres run	Nao Kazami	Japan	6:09:14	Lake Saroma, Japan	24 June 2018
Men's decathlon	Kevin Mayer	France	9126 pts	Talence, France	16 September 2018
Women's 3000 metres steeplechase	Beatrice Chepkoech	Kenya	8:44.32	Fontvieille, Monaco	20 July 2018
Women's 5K run (mixed sex race)	Caroline Chepkoech Kipkirui	Kenya	14:48	Prague, Czech Republic	8 September 2018
Women's half marathon (women only race)	Netsanet Gudeta	Ethiopia	1:06:11	Valencia, Spain	24 March 2018
Women's 50 kilometres race walk	Liang Rui	China	4:04:36	Taicang, China	5 May 2018

== Awards ==
=== Men ===
Award	Winner
IAAF World Athlete of the Year	Eliud Kipchoge (KEN)
Track & Field News Athlete of the Year	Eliud Kipchoge (KEN)
European Athlete of the Year	Kevin Mayer (FRA)
European Athletics Rising Star	Armand Duplantis (SWE) Jakob Ingebrigtsen (NOR)
The Bowerman	Michael Norman (USA)

=== Women ===
Award	Winner
IAAF World Athlete of the Year	Caterine Ibargüen (COL)
Track & Field News Athlete of the Year	Caster Semenya (RSA)
European Athlete of the Year	Dina Asher-Smith (GBR)
European Athletics Rising Star	Elvira Herman (BLR)
The Bowerman	Keturah Orji (USA)

== Season's bests ==
Best marks of the year
Event	Men			Women		
Event	Athlete	Mark	Notes	Athlete	Mark	Notes
60 metres	Christian Coleman (USA)	6.34		Murielle Ahouré (CIV)	6.97	
100 metres	Christian Coleman (USA)	9.79		Marie-Josée Ta Lou (CIV) Dina Asher-Smith (GBR)	10.85	Tie
200 metres	Noah Lyles (USA)	19.65		Dina Asher-Smith (GBR)	21.89	
400 metres	Michael Norman (USA)	43.61		Shaunae Miller-Uibo (BAH)	48.97	
800 metres	Emmanuel Korir (KEN)	1:42.05		Caster Semenya (RSA)	1:54.25	
1500 metres	Timothy Cheruiyot (KEN)	3:28.41		Genzebe Dibaba (ETH)	3:56.68	
3000 metres	Yomif Kejelcha (ETH)	7:28.00		Sifan Hassan (NED)	8:27.50	
5000 metres	Selemon Barega (ETH)	12:43.02		Hellen Obiri (KEN)	14:21.75	
10,000 metres	Stanley Waithaka Mburu (KEN)	27:13.01		Pauline Kaveke Kamulu (KEN)	30:41.85	
60 metres hurdles	Grant Holloway (USA)	7.42		Sharika Nelvis (USA)	7.70	
100/110 metres hurdles	Sergey Shubenkov (ANA)	12.92		Kendra Harrison (USA)	12.36	
400 metres hurdles	Abderrahman Samba (QAT)	46.98		Sydney McLaughlin (USA)	52.75	
3000 metres steeplechase	Soufiane El Bakkali (MAR)	7:58.15		Beatrice Chepkoech (KEN)	8:44.32	
10 kilometres	Rhonex Kipruto (KEN)	26:46		Caroline Chepkoech Kipkirui (KEN)	30:19	
15 kilometres	Joshua Cheptegei (UGA)	41:05		Stella Chesang (UGA)	47:19	
20 kilometres	Samuel Tsegay (ERI)	58:21		Damaris Muthee Mutua (BHR)	1:08:28	
Half marathon	Abraham Kiptum (KEN)	58:18		Fancy Chemutai (KEN)	1:04:52	
Marathon	Eliud Kipchoge (KEN)	2:01:39		Gladys Cherono Kiprono (KEN)	2:18:11	
20 kilometres race walk	Sergey Shirobukov (RUS)	1:17:25		Elena Lashmanova (RUS)	1:23:39	
50 kilometres race walk	Tomohiro Noda (JPN)	3:39:47		Rui Liang (CHN)	4:04:36	
Pole vault	Armand Duplantis (SWE)	6.05 m		Sandi Morris (USA)	4.95 m	
High jump	Mutaz Essa Barshim (QAT) Danil Lysenko (ANA)	2.40 m	Tie	Mariya Lasitskene (ANA)	2.04 m	
Long jump	Juan Miguel Echevarría (CUB)	8.68 m		Lorraine Ugen (GBR)	7.05 m	
Triple jump	Pedro Pablo Pichardo (POR)	17.95 m		Caterine Ibargüen (COL)	14.96 m	
Shot put	Tom Walsh (NZL)	22.67 m		Gong Lijiao (CHN)	20.38 m	
Discus throw	Daniel Ståhl (SWE)	69.72 m		Sandra Perković (CRO)	71.38 m	
Javelin throw	Johannes Vetter (GER)	92.70 m		Kathryn Mitchell (AUS)	68.92 m	
Hammer throw	Wojciech Nowicki (POL)	81.85 m		Anita Włodarczyk (POL)	79.59 m	
Pentathlon	—			Erica Bougard (USA)	4760 pts	
Heptathlon	Kevin Mayer (FRA)	6348 pts		Nafissatou Thiam (BEL)	6816 pts	
Decathlon	Kevin Mayer (FRA)	9126 pts		—		
4×100 metres relay	Great Britain (GBR); Chijindu Ujah; Zharnel Hughes; Adam Gemili; Nethaneel Mitchell-Blake	37.61		Great Britain (GBR); Asha Philip; Imani-Lara Lansiquot; Bianca Williams; Dina Asher-Smith	41.88	
4×400 metres relay	United States (USA); Ricky Morgan; Rai Benjamin; Zachary Shinnick; Michael Norman	2:59.00		Jamaica (JAM); Christine Day; Anastasia Le-Roy; Janieve Russell; Stephenie Ann McPherson	3:24.00	

== Detailed results ==
=== World and continental athletics events ===
- March 2 – 4: 2018 IAAF World Indoor Championships in (United Kingdom) Birmingham
  - United States won both the gold and overall medal tallies.
- March 24: 2018 IAAF World Half Marathon Championships in (Spain) Valencia
  - Individual winners: (Kenya) Geoffrey Kipsang Kamworor (m) / (Ethiopia) Netsanet Gudeta (f)
  - Team winners: Ethiopia (m) / Ethiopia (f)
- April 7: 2018 World University Cross Country Championships in (Switzerland) St. Gallen
  - Individual winners: (Algeria) El Hocine Zourkane (m) / (Germany) Caterina Juliet Granz (f)
  - Team winners: South Africa (m) / Japan (f)
- May 5 & 6: 2018 IAAF World Race Walking Team Championships in Taicang
  - Individual 10 km Walk winners: (China) ZHANG Yao (m) / (Mexico) Alegna González (f)
  - Team 10 km Walk winners: China (m) / China (f)
  - Individual 20 km Walk winners: (Japan) Koki Ikeda (m) / (Mexico) Lupita González (f)
  - Team 20 km Walk winners: Japan (m) / China (f)
  - Individual 50 km Walk winners: (Japan) Hirooki Arai (m) / (China) LIANG Rui (f)
  - Team 50 km Walk winners: Japan (m) / China (f)
- July 5 – 8: 2018 European Athletics U18 Championships in (Hungary) Győr
  - Great Britain won the gold medal tally. France won the overall medal tally.
- July 10 – 15: 2018 IAAF World U20 Championships in (Finland) Tampere
  - Kenya won the gold medal tally. United States won the overall medal tally.
- August 7 – 12: 2018 European Athletics Championships in Berlin
  - Great Britain & Poland won 7 gold medals each. Germany won the overall medal tally.
- September 8 & 9: 2018 IAAF Continental Cup in (Czech Republic) Ostrava
  - Champions: Team Americas; Second: (European Union) Team Europe; Third: Team Asia-Pacific; Fourth: Team Africa

=== 2018 World Marathon Majors ===
- February 25: (Japan) 2018 Tokyo Marathon
  - Winners: (Kenya) Dickson Chumba (m) / (Ethiopia) Birhane Dibaba (f)
- April 16: (United States) 2018 Boston Marathon
  - Winners: (Japan) Yuki Kawauchi (m) / (United States) Desiree Linden (f)
- April 22: (United Kingdom) 2018 London Marathon
  - Winners: (Kenya) Eliud Kipchoge (m) / (Kenya) Vivian Cheruiyot (f)
- September 16: (Germany) 2018 Berlin Marathon
  - Winners: (Kenya) Eliud Kipchoge (m) (World Record) / (Kenya) Gladys Cherono Kiprono (f)
- October 7: (United States) 2018 Chicago Marathon
  - Winners: (United Kingdom) Mo Farah (m) / (Kenya) Brigid Kosgei (f)
- November 4: (United States) 2018 New York City Marathon (final)
  - Winners: (Ethiopia) Lelisa Desisa (m) / (Kenya) Mary Jepkosgei Keitany (f)

=== 2018 IAAF Diamond League ===
- May 4: Qatar Athletic Super Grand Prix in Doha
  - 1500 m winners: (Ethiopia) Taresa Tolosa (m) / (South Africa) Caster Semenya (f)
  - Men's 200 m winner: (United States) Noah Lyles
  - Men's 400 m winner: (The Bahamas) Steven Gardiner
  - Men's 800 m winner: (Kenya) Emmanuel Korir
  - Men's 3000 m Steeplechase winner: (Ethiopia) Chala Beyo
  - Men's 400 m Hurdles winner: (Qatar) Abderrahaman Samba
  - Men's High Jump winner: (Qatar) Mutaz Essa Barshim
  - Men's Triple Jump winner: (Cuba) Pedro Pablo Pichardo
  - Men's Javelin Throw winner: (Germany) Thomas Röhler
  - Women's 100 m winner: (Ivory Coast) Marie-Josée Ta Lou
  - Women's 3000 m winner: (Kenya) Caroline Chepkoech Kipkirui
  - Women's 100 m Hurdles winner: (United States) Kendra Harrison
  - Women's Pole Vault winner: (United States) Sandi Morris
  - Women's Discus Throw winner: (Croatia) Sandra Perković
- May 12: Shanghai Golden Grand Prix in China
  - Men's 100 m winner: (United Kingdom) Reece Prescod
  - Men's 400 m winner: (The Bahamas) Steven Gardiner
  - Men's 800 m winner: (Kenya) Wycliffe Kinyamal
  - Men's 1500 m winner: (Kenya) Timothy Cheruiyot
  - Men's 5000 m winner: (Bahrain) Birhanu Balew
  - Men's 110 m Hurdles winner: (Jamaica) Omar McLeod
  - Men's Pole Vault winner: (France) Renaud Lavillenie
  - Men's Long Jump winner: (South Africa) Luvo Manyonga
  - Women's 200 m winner: (The Bahamas) Shaunae Miller-Uibo
  - Women's 3000 m Steeplechase winner: (Kenya) Beatrice Chepkoech
  - Women's 100 m Hurdles winner: (United States) Brianna McNeal
  - Women's 400 m Hurdles winner: (United States) Dalilah Muhammad
  - Women's High Jump winner: (Authorised Neutral Athletes) Mariya Lasitskene (Russia)
  - Women's Triple Jump winner: (Colombia) Caterine Ibargüen
  - Women's Shot Put winner: (China) Gong Lijiao
  - Women's Javelin Throw winner: (China) Lü Huihui
- May 25 & 26: Prefontaine Classic in (United States) Eugene, Oregon
  - 100 m winners: (United States) Ronnie Baker (m) / (Ivory Coast) Marie-Josée Ta Lou (f)
  - 800 m winners: (Kenya) Emmanuel Korir (m) / (South Africa) Caster Semenya (f)
  - Pole Vault winners: (United States) Sam Kendricks (m) / (United States) Jenn Suhr (f)
  - Men's 200 m winner: (United States) Noah Lyles
  - Men's One Mile winner: (Kenya) Timothy Cheruiyot
  - Men's Two Miles winner: (Ethiopia) Selemon Barega
  - Men's 3000 m Steeplechase winner: (Kenya) Benjamin Kigen
  - Men's 110 m Hurdles winner: (Jamaica) Omar McLeod
  - Men's High Jump winner: (Qatar) Mutaz Essa Barshim
  - Men's Triple Jump winner: (United States) Christian Taylor
  - Men's Shot Put winner: (United States) Ryan Crouser
  - Men's Javelin Throw winner: (Germany) Thomas Röhler
  - Women's 400 m winner: (The Bahamas) Shaunae Miller-Uibo
  - Women's 1500 m winner: (United States) Shelby Houlihan
  - Women's 5000 m winner: (Ethiopia) Genzebe Dibaba
  - Women's 400 m Hurdles winner: (Jamaica) Janieve Russell
- May 31: Golden Gala Pietro Mennea in (Italy) Rome
  - 400 m winners: (United States) Fred Kerley (m) / (Bahrain) Salwa Eid Naser (f)
  - 3000 m Steeplechase winners: (Kenya) Conseslus Kipruto (m) / (Kenya) Hyvin Jepkemoi (f)
  - 400 m Hurdles winners: (Qatar) Abderrahaman Samba (m) / (United States) Georganne Moline (f)
  - Discus Throw winners: (Jamaica) Fedrick Dacres (m) / (Croatia) Sandra Perković (f)
  - Men's 100 m winner: (United States) Ronnie Baker
  - Men's 800 m winner: (Kenya) Wycliffe Kinyamal
  - Men's 1500 m winner: (Kenya) Timothy Cheruiyot
  - Men's Pole Vault winner: (United States) Sam Kendricks
  - Men's Long Jump winner: (South Africa) Luvo Manyonga
  - Women's 200 m winner: (Ivory Coast) Marie-Josée Ta Lou
  - Women's 100 m Hurdles winner: (United States) Sharika Nelvis
  - Women's High Jump winner: (Authorised Neutral Athletes) Mariya Lasitskene (Russia)
- June 7: Bislett Games in (Norway) Oslo
  - 400 m Hurdles winners: (Qatar) Abderrahman Samba (m) / (United States) Dalilah Muhammad (f)
  - Men's 200 m winner: (Turkey) Ramil Guliyev
  - Men's 1500 m winner: (United Kingdom) Chris O'Hare
  - Men's One Mile winner: (Kenya) Elijah Manangoi
  - Men's 10000 m winner: (Kenya) Dominic Chemut Kiptarus
  - Men's High Jump winner: (Qatar) Mutaz Essa Barshim
  - Men's Shot Put winner: (New Zealand) Tomas Walsh
  - Men's Discus Throw winner: (Lithuania) Andrius Gudžius
  - Women's 100 m winner: (Ivory Coast) Murielle Ahouré
  - Women's 400 m winner: (Bahrain) Salwa Eid Naser
  - Women's 800 m winner: (South Africa) Caster Semenya
  - Women's 3000 m Steeplechase winner: (Kenya) Hyvin Jepkemoi
  - Women's 100 m Hurdles winner: (Jamaica) Danielle Williams
  - Women's Pole Vault winner: (United States) Sandi Morris
  - Women's Triple Jump winner: (Colombia) Caterine Ibargüen
  - Women's Javelin Throw winner: (Belarus) Tatsiana Khaladovich
- June 10: Stockholm Bauhaus Athletics in Sweden
  - 100 m winners: (Iran) Hassan Taftian (m) / (United Kingdom) Dina Asher-Smith (f)
  - 200 m winners: (Turkey) Ramil Guliyev (m) / (Bulgaria) Ivet Lalova-Collio (f)
  - 800 m winners: (Australia) Peter Bol (m) / (Ethiopia) Shume Chaltu Regasa (f)
  - Pole Vault winners: (Sweden) Armand Duplantis (m) / (United States) Sandi Morris (f)
  - Long Jump winners: (Cuba) Juan Miguel Echevarría (m) / (United Kingdom) Lorraine Ugen (f)
  - Men's 1000 m winner: (Kenya) Ferguson Cheruiyot Rotich
  - Men's 5000 m winner: (Ethiopia) Selemon Barega
  - Men's 400 m Hurdles winner: (Qatar) Abderrahman Samba
  - Men's Discus Throw winner: (Jamaica) Fedrick Dacres
  - Women's 400 m winner: (Bahrain) Salwa Eid Naser
  - Women's 1500 m winner: (Ethiopia) Gudaf Tsegay
  - Women's 100 m Hurdles winner: (United States) Brianna McNeal
  - Women's High Jump winner: (Authorised Neutral Athletes) Mariya Lasitskene (Russia)
- June 30: Meeting de Paris in France
  - 200 m winners: (United States) Michael Norman (m) / (Jamaica) Shericka Jackson (f)
  - 800 m winners: (Kenya) Ferguson Cheruiyot Rotich (m) / (South Africa) Caster Semenya (f)
  - Discus Throw winners: (Jamaica) Fedrick Dacres (m) / (Croatia) Sandra Perković (f)
  - Men's 100 m winner: (United States) Ronnie Baker
  - Men's 1500 m winner: (Kenya) Timothy Cheruiyot
  - Men's 110 m Hurdles winner: (Jamaica) Ronald Levy
  - Men's 400 m Hurdles winner: (Qatar) Abderrahman Samba
  - Men's Pole Vault winner: (United States) Sam Kendricks
  - Women's 400 m winner: (Bahrain) Salwa Eid Naser
  - Women's 3000 m Steeplechase winner: (Kenya) Beatrice Chepkoech
  - Women's High Jump winner: (Authorised Neutral Athletes) Mariya Lasitskene (Russia)
  - Women's Triple Jump winner: (Colombia) Caterine Ibargüen
- July 5: Athletissima in (Switzerland) Lausanne
  - 200 m winners: (United States) Noah Lyles (m) / (United States) Gabrielle Thomas (f)
  - 400 m Hurdles winners: (Qatar) Abderrahman Samba (m) / (United States) Shamier Little (f)
  - Pole Vault winners: (France) Renaud Lavillenie (m) / (Greece) Katerina Stefanidi (f)
  - Men's 5000 m winner: (Bahrain) Birhanu Balew
  - Men's 110 m Hurdles winner: (Authorised Neutral Athletes) Sergey Shubenkov (Russia)
  - Men's High Jump winner: (Authorised Neutral Athletes) Danil Lysenko (Russia)
  - Men's Triple Jump winner: (United States) Christian Taylor
  - Men's Shot Put winner: (New Zealand) Tomas Walsh
  - Women's 100 m winner: (Ivory Coast) Marie-Josée Ta Lou
  - Women's 400 m winner: (Bahrain) Salwa Eid Naser
  - Women's 800 m winner: (Burundi) Francine Niyonsaba
  - Women's 1500 m winner: (United States) Shelby Houlihan
  - Women's Long Jump winner: (Germany) Malaika Mihambo
  - Women's Javelin Throw winner: (Czech Republic) Nikola Ogrodníková
- July 13: Meeting International Mohammed VI d'Athlétisme de Rabat in Morocco
  - Men's 100 m winner: (United States) Christian Coleman
  - Men's 400 m winner: (Jamaica) Akeem Bloomfield
  - Men's 1500 m winner: (Morocco) Brahim Kaazouzi
  - Men's 3000 m winner: (Ethiopia) Yomif Kejelcha
  - Men's 3000 m Steeplechase winner: (Kenya) Benjamin Kigen
  - Men's Pole Vault winner: (United States) Sam Kendricks
  - Men's Long Jump winner: (Jamaica) Tajay Gayle
  - Men's Javelin Throw winner: (Estonia) Magnus Kirt
  - Women's 200 m winner: (The Bahamas) Shaunae Miller-Uibo
  - Women's 800 m winner: (Burundi) Francine Niyonsaba
  - Women's 1000 m winner: (South Africa) Caster Semenya
  - Women's 5000 m winner: (Kenya) Hellen Obiri
  - Women's 100 m Hurdles winner: (United States) Brianna McNeal
  - Women's High Jump winner: (Bulgaria) Mirela Demireva
  - Women's Triple Jump winner: (Colombia) Caterine Ibargüen
  - Women's Shot Put winner: (Germany) Christina Schwanitz
- July 20: Herculis in Fontvieille, Monaco
  - 800 m winners: (Botswana) Nijel Amos (m) / (South Africa) Caster Semenya (f)
  - 3000 m Steeplechase winners: (Morocco) Soufiane El Bakkali (m) / (Kenya) Beatrice Chepkoech (f)
  - Shot Put winners: (United States) Ryan Crouser (m) / (China) Gong Lijiao (f)
  - Men's 200 m winner: (United States) Noah Lyles
  - Men's 1500 m winner: (Kenya) Timothy Cheruiyot
  - Men's 110 m Hurdles winner: (Authorised Neutral Athletes) Sergey Shubenkov (Russia)
  - Men's High Jump winner: (Authorised Neutral Athletes) Danil Lysenko (Russia)
  - Men's Triple Jump winner: (United States) Christian Taylor
  - Women's 100 m winner: (Ivory Coast) Marie-Josée Ta Lou
  - Women's 400 m winner: (The Bahamas) Shaunae Miller-Uibo
  - Women's 100 m Hurdles winner: (United States) Queen Harrison
  - Women's Pole Vault winner: (Authorised Neutral Athletes) Anzhelika Sidorova (Russia)
- July 21 & 22: Müller Anniversary Games in (United Kingdom) London
  - 100 m winners: (United States) Ronnie Baker (m) / (Jamaica) Shelly-Ann Fraser-Pryce (f)
  - 200 m winners: (Jamaica) Akeem Bloomfield (m) / (United States) Jenna Prandini (f)
  - 400 m winners: (Qatar) Abdalelah Haroun (m) / (Jamaica) Stephenie Ann McPherson (f)
  - 800 m winners: (Kenya) Emmanuel Korir (m) / (United States) Ce'Aira Brown (f)
  - 400 m Hurdles winners: (Norway) Karsten Warholm (m) / (United States) Shamier Little (f)
  - Long Jump winners: (South Africa) Luvo Manyonga (m) / (United Kingdom) Shara Proctor (f)
  - Men's 1500 m winner: (United States) Matthew Centrowitz Jr.
  - Men's 5000 m winner: (United States) Paul Chelimo
  - Men's 3000 m Race Walk winner: (United Kingdom) Tom Bosworth
  - Men's 110 m Hurdles winner: (Jamaica) Ronald Levy
  - Men's Pole Vault winner: (United States) Sam Kendricks
  - Women's One Mile winner: (Netherlands) Sifan Hassan
  - Women's 3000 m winner: (Kenya) Lilian Kasait Rengeruk
  - Women's 100 m Hurdles winner: (United States) Kendra Harrison
  - Women's Javelin Throw winner: (China) Lü Huihui
  - Women's High Jump winner: (Authorised Neutral Athletes) Mariya Lasitskene (Russia)
  - Women's Discus Throw winner: (Croatia) Sandra Perković
- August 18: Müller Grand Prix Birmingham in Great Britain
  - Long Jump winners: (South Africa) Luvo Manyonga (m) / (Germany) Malaika Mihambo (f)
  - Men's 100 m winner: (United States) Christian Coleman
  - Men's 400 m winner: (United States) Fred Kerley
  - Men's 800 m winner: (Kenya) Emmanuel Korir
  - Men's One Mile winner: (Australia) Stewart McSweyn
  - Men's 3000 m Steeplechase winner: (Kenya) Conseslus Kipruto
  - Men's 110 m Hurdles winner: (Spain) Orlando Ortega
  - Men's High Jump winner: (Australia) Brandon Starc
  - Men's Javelin Throw winner: (Germany) Andreas Hofmann
  - Women's 200 m winner: (The Bahamas) Shaunae Miller-Uibo
  - Women's 1000 m winner: (United Kingdom) Laura Muir
  - Women's 1500 m winner: (Netherlands) Sifan Hassan
  - Women's 3000 m winner: (Kenya) Agnes Jebet Tirop
  - Women's 100 m Hurdles winner: (Germany) Pamela Dutkiewicz
  - Women's 400 m Hurdles winner: (Switzerland) Léa Sprunger
  - Women's Pole Vault winner: (United States) Sandi Morris
  - Women's Shot Put winner: (Germany) Christina Schwanitz
- August 29 & 30: Weltklasse Zürich in Switzerland
  - 400 m Hurdles winners: (British Virgin Islands) Kyron McMaster (m) / (United States) Dalilah Muhammad (f)
  - Javelin Throw winners: (Germany) Andreas Hofmann (m) / (Belarus) Tatsiana Khaladovich (f)
  - Men's 200 m winner: (United States) Noah Lyles
  - Men's 400 m winner: (United States) Fred Kerley
  - Men's 1500 m winner: (Kenya) Timothy Cheruiyot
  - Men's 3000 m Steeplechase winner: (Kenya) Conseslus Kipruto
  - Men's Pole Vault winner: (Authorised Neutral Athletes) Timur Morgunov (Russia)
  - Men's Long Jump winner: (South Africa) Luvo Manyonga
  - Men's Shot Put winner: (New Zealand) Tomas Walsh
  - Women's 100 m winner: (Ivory Coast) Murielle Ahouré
  - Women's 800 m winner: (South Africa) Caster Semenya
  - Women's 5000 m winner: (Kenya) Hellen Obiri
  - Women's High Jump winner: (Authorised Neutral Athletes) Mariya Lasitskene (Russia)
  - Women's Pole Vault winner: (Greece) Katerina Stefanidi
  - Women's Triple Jump winner: (Colombia) Caterine Ibargüen
- August 31: Memorial Van Damme (final) in (Belgium) Brussels
  - 400 m winners: (Belgium) Jonathan Sacoor (m) / (Bahrain) Salwa Eid Naser (f)
  - 800 m winners: (Kenya) Emmanuel Korir (m) / (United Kingdom) Lynsey Sharp (f)
  - High Jump winners: (Australia) Brandon Starc (m) / (Belgium) Nafissatou Thiam (f)
  - Discus Throw winners: (Jamaica) Fedrick Dacres (m) / (Cuba) Yaime Pérez (f)
  - Men's 100 m winner: (United States) Christian Coleman
  - Men's 5000 m winner: (Ethiopia) Selemon Barega
  - Men's 110 m Hurdles winner: (Authorised Neutral Athletes) Sergey Shubenkov (Russia)
  - Men's Pole Vault winner: (Authorised Neutral Athletes) Timur Morgunov (Russia)
  - Men's Triple Jump winner: (Portugal) Pedro Pablo Pichardo
  - Women's 200 m winner: (The Bahamas) Shaunae Miller-Uibo
  - Women's 1500 m winner: (United Kingdom) Laura Muir
  - Women's 3000 m Steeplechase winner: (Kenya) Beatrice Chepkoech
  - Women's 100 m Hurdles winner: (United States) Brianna McNeal
  - Women's 400 m Hurdles winner: (Ukraine) Hanna Ryzhykova
  - Women's Shot Put winner: (China) Gong Lijiao
  - Women's Long Jump winner: (Colombia) Caterine Ibargüen

=== 2018 IAAF World Challenge & IAAF Hammer Throw Challenge ===
- May 19: Jamaica International Invitational in Kingston
  - 100 m winners: (United States) Ronnie Baker (m) / (Jamaica) Elaine Thompson (f)
  - 200 m winners: (Jamaica) Christopher Taylor (m) / (Jamaica) Shericka Jackson (f)
  - 400 m winners: (Jamaica) Demish Gaye (m) / (United States) Jessica Beard (f)
  - 400 m Hurdles winners: (United States) TJ Holmes (m) / (Jamaica) Janieve Russell (f)
  - Men's 800 m winner: (Puerto Rico) Ryan Sánchez
  - Men's 3000 m winner: (Puerto Rico) Alfredo Santana
  - Men's High Jump winner: (The Bahamas) Jamal Wilson
  - Men's Triple Jump winner: (United States) Omar Craddock
  - Women's 1500 m winner: (United States) Stephanie Brown
  - Women's 100 m Hurdles winner: (United States) Jasmin Stowers
  - Women's Long Jump winner: (Nigeria) Ese Brume
  - Women's Shot Put winner: (United States) Jeneva Stevens
  - Women's Hammer Throw winner: (United States) DeAnna Price
- May 20: Golden Grand Prix in (Japan) Osaka
  - 100 m winners: (United States) Justin Gatlin (m) / (China) Wei Yongli (f)
  - 800 m winners: (Morocco) Mostafa Smaili (m) / (Kenya) Emily Cherotich Tuei (f)
  - 400 m Hurdles winners: (Japan) Takatoshi Abe (m) / (Canada) Sage Watson (f)
  - Pole Vault winners: (United States) Scott Houston (m) / (United States) Kristen Hixson (f)
  - Javelin Throw winners: (Chinese Taipei) Cheng Chao-tsun (m) / (China) Liu Shiying (f)
  - Men's 200 m winner: (Botswana) Isaac Makwala
  - Men's 1500 m winner: (Australia) Ryan Gregson
  - Men's 110 m Hurdles winner: (Chinese Taipei) Chen Kuei-ru
  - Men's High Jump winner: (Japan) Naoto Tobe
  - Men's Long Jump winner: (United States) Jarvis Gotch
  - Men's Shot Put winner: (Australia) Damien Birkinhead
  - Men's Hammer Throw winner: (Poland) Paweł Fajdek
  - Women's 400 m winner: (Poland) Justyna Święty-Ersetic
  - Women's 3000 m winner: (Ethiopia) Shuru Bulo
  - Women's 100 m Hurdles winner: (United States) Queen Harrison
- June 3: Fanny Blankers-Koen Games in (Netherlands) Hengelo (World Challenge only)
  - 200 m winners: (South Africa) Luxolo Adams (m) / (Netherlands) Dafne Schippers (f)
  - 400 m winners: (Qatar) Abdalelah Haroun (m) / (United States) Shakima Wimbley (f)
  - Men's 800 m winner: (Kenya) Jonathan Kitilit
  - Men's 110 m Hurdles winner: (Authorised Neutral Athletes) Sergey Shubenkov (Russia)
  - Men's Pole Vault winner: (United States) Sam Kendricks
  - Men's Long Jump winner: (South Africa) Luvo Manyonga
  - Women's One Mile winner: (United States) Jenny Simpson
  - Women's 100 m Hurdles winner: (United States) Brianna McNeal
  - Women's High Jump winner: (Authorised Neutral Athletes) Mariya Lasitskene (Russia)
- June 5: Paavo Nurmi Games in (Finland) Turku
  - 200 m winners: (Turkey) Ramil Guliyev (m) / (United Kingdom) Finette Agyapong (f)
  - 400 m Hurdles winners: (France) Mamadou Kassé Hanne (m) / (United Kingdom) Meghan Beesley (f)
  - Men's 1500 m winner: (Morocco) Younès Essalhi
  - Men's 3000 m Steeplechase winner: (Kenya) Nicholas Kiptonui Bett
  - Men's 110 m Hurdles winner: (Authorised Neutral Athletes) Sergey Shubenkov (Russia)
  - Men's High Jump winner: (Belarus) Maksim Nedasekau
  - Men's Hammer Throw winner: (Poland) Wojciech Nowicki
  - Men's Javelin Throw winner: (Estonia) Magnus Kirt
  - Women's 3000 m winner: (Ethiopia) Meskerem Mamo
  - Women's 100 m Hurdles winner: (United States) Ebony Morrison
  - Women's Pole Vault winner: (Greece) Nikoleta Kyriakopoulou
  - Women's Triple Jump winner: (United States) Tori Franklin
  - Women's Discus Throw winner: (Croatia) Sandra Perković
- June 13: 57th Golden Spike Ostrava in (Czech Republic) Ostrava
  - 200 m winners: (Canada) Aaron Brown (m) / (Netherlands) Dafne Schippers (f)
  - Men's 100 m winner: (United States) Justin Gatlin
  - Men's 400 m winner: (Qatar) Abdalelah Haroun
  - Men's 3000 m winner: (Ethiopia) Selemon Barega
  - Men's 110 m Hurdles winner: (France) Pascal Martinot-Lagarde
  - Men's Discus Throw winner: (Lithuania) Andrius Gudžius
  - Men's High Jump winner: (Qatar) Mutaz Essa Barshim
  - Men's Pole Vault winner: (Poland) Paweł Wojciechowski
  - Men's Long Jump winner: (Cuba) Juan Miguel Echevarría
  - Men's Shot Put winner: (New Zealand) Tomas Walsh
  - Men's Javelin Throw winner: (Czech Republic) Jakub Vadlejch
  - Women's 800 m winner: (Morocco) Rababe Arafi
  - Women's 1500 m winner: (Ethiopia) Gudaf Tsegay
  - Women's 3000 m Steeplechase winner: (Kenya) Norah Jeruto
  - Women's Hammer Throw winner: (Poland) Anita Włodarczyk
- June 22: Meeting de Atletismo Madrid in (Spain) Madrid (World Challenge only)
  - 800 m winners: (Spain) Álvaro de Arriba (m) / (Germany) Christina Hering (f)
  - Men's 100 m winner: (China) Su Bingtian
  - Men's 400 m winner: (Dominican Republic) Luguelín Santos
  - Men's 3000 m Steeplechase winner: (Uganda) Albert Chemutai
  - Men's 110 m Hurdles winner: (Brazil) Gabriel Constantino
  - Men's High Jump winner: (Authorised Neutral Athletes) Danil Lysenko (Russia)
  - Men's Pole Vault winner: (Portugal) Diogo Ferreira
  - Men's Triple Jump winner: (Azerbaijan) Alexis Copello
  - Men's Javelin Throw winner: (Poland) Marcin Krukowski
  - Women's 200 m winner: (Ecuador) Ángela Tenorio
  - Women's 1500 m winner: (Ethiopia) Gudaf Tsegay
  - Women's 100 m Hurdles winner: (Belgium) Eline Berings
  - Women's Long Jump winner: (United Kingdom) Shara Proctor
  - Women's Shot Put winner: (Germany) Christina Schwanitz
  - Women's Hammer Throw winner: (Poland) Anita Włodarczyk
- June 29: P-T-S Meeting in (Slovakia) Šamorín (Hammer Throw Challenge only)
  - Men's Hammer Throw winner: (Poland) Wojciech Nowicki
- July 1 & 2: István Gyulai Memorial in (Hungary) Székesfehérvár (Hammer Throw Challenge only)
  - Winners: (Poland) Wojciech Nowicki (m) / (Poland) Anita Włodarczyk (f)
- July 8: Grande Premio Brasil Caixa de Atletismo in (Brazil) Bragança Paulista (World Challenge only)
  - 100 m winners: (Brazil) Paulo André Camilo de Oliveira (m) / (Brazil) Vitória Cristina Rosa (f)
  - 3000 m Steeplechase winners: (Kenya) Nicholas Kiptonui Bett (m) / (Ethiopia) Birtukan Adamu (f)
  - Triple Jump winners: (United States) Chris Carter (m) / (Cuba) Liadagmis Povea (f)
  - Shot Put winners: (United States) Curt Jensen (m) / (Cuba) Yaniuvis López (f)
  - Discus Throw winners: (Cyprus) Apostolos Parellis (m) / (Brazil) Andressa de Morais (f)
  - Men's 400 m winner: (Grenada) Bralon Taplin
  - Men's 400 m Hurdles winner: (Brazil) Márcio Teles
  - Men's Pole Vault winner: (United States) Cole Walsh
  - Men's Hammer Throw winner: (Tajikistan) Dilshod Nazarov
  - Women's 100 m Hurdles winner: (United States) Ebony Morrison
  - Women's High Jump winner: (Saint Lucia) Levern Spencer
- August 22: Kamila Skolimowska Memorial in (Poland) Chorzów (Hammer Throw Challenge only)
  - Women's Hammer Throw winner: (Poland) Joanna Fiodorow
- September 2: ISTAF Berlin in Germany (World Challenge only)
  - 100 m winners: (Jamaica) Tyquendo Tracey (m) / (Ivory Coast) Marie-Josée Ta Lou (f)
  - Javelin Throw winners: (Germany) Thomas Röhler (m) / (Australia) Kelsey-Lee Roberts (f)
  - Men's 1500 m winner: (Kenya) Timothy Cheruiyot
  - Men's 110 m Hurdles winner: (Spain) Orlando Ortega
  - Men's High Jump winner: (Belarus) Maksim Nedasekau
  - Men's Discus Throw winner: (Germany) Christoph Harting
  - Women's 1000 m winner: (South Africa) Caster Semenya
  - Women's One Mile winner: (Portugal) Marta Pen
  - Women's 3000 m Steeplechase winner: (United States) Colleen Quigley
  - Women's 100 m Hurdles winner: (United States) Christina Manning
  - Women's Long Jump winner: (Australia) Brooke Stratton
  - Women's Triple Jump winner: (Jamaica) Kimberly Williams
  - Women's Shot Put winner: (Germany) Christina Schwanitz
- September 3 & 4: IWC Zagreb 2018 (final) in Croatia (World Challenge only)
  - 100 m winners: (United States) Mike Rodgers (m) / (Ivory Coast) Marie-Josée Ta Lou (f)
  - 400 m winners: (Slovenia) Luka Janežič (m) / (Bahrain) Salwa Eid Naser (f)
  - Discus Throw winners: (Jamaica) Fedrick Dacres (m) / (Croatia) Sandra Perković (f)
  - Men's 200 m winner: (Panama) Alonso Edward
  - Men's 800 m winner: (Botswana) Nijel Amos
  - Men's 1500 m winner: (Kenya) Elijah Manangoi
  - Men's 110 m Hurdles winner: (Spain) Orlando Ortega
  - Men's Shot Put winner: (United States) Ryan Crouser
  - Men's Pole Vault winner: (Authorised Neutral Athletes) Timur Morgunov (Russia)
  - Men's Long Jump winner: (South Africa) Luvo Manyonga
  - Women's 3000 m winner: (Kenya) Lilian Kasait Rengeruk
  - Women's 100 m Hurdles winner: (United States) Sharika Nelvis
  - Women's 400 m Hurdles winner: (Ukraine) Hanna Ryzhykova
  - Women's Triple Jump winner: (Romania) Elena Panțuroiu

=== 2018 IAAF World Indoor Tour ===
- February 3: Weltklasse in Karlsruhe in Germany
  - 60 m winners: (China) Su Bingtian (m) / (Germany) Tatjana Pinto (f)
  - Women's 60 m Hurdles winner: (United States) Sharika Nelvis
  - Women's 400 m winner: (Switzerland) Léa Sprunger
  - Men's 800 m winner: (Poland) Marcin Lewandowski
  - Women's 1500 m winner: (Ethiopia) Genzebe Dibaba
  - Men's 3000 m winner: (Ethiopia) Hagos Gebrhiwet
  - Women's High Jump winner: (Bulgaria) Mirela Demireva
  - Men's Pole Vault winner: (Germany) Raphael Holzdeppe
  - Long Jump winners: (Cuba) Juan Miguel Echevarría (m) / (Germany) Malaika Mihambo (f)
- February 6: PSD Bank Meeting in (Germany) Düsseldorf
  - 60 m winners: (China) Su Bingtian (m) / (United Kingdom) Asha Philip (f)
  - 60 m Hurdles winners: (Hungary) Balázs Baji (m) / (United States) Christina Manning (f)
  - 1500 m winners: (Kenya) Vincent Kibet
  - Men's 800 m winner: (Poland) Adam Kszczot
  - Women's 1500 m winner: (Kenya) Beatrice Chepkoech
  - Men's 3000 m winner: (Ethiopia) Yomif Kejelcha
  - Men's Pole Vault winner: (Poland) Piotr Lisek
  - Men's Shot Put winner: (Czech Republic) Tomáš Staněk
  - Women's Long Jump winner: (Serbia) Ivana Španović
- February 8: Madrid Indoor Meeting in Spain
  - 400 m winners: (Spain) Óscar Husillos (m) / (Switzerland) Léa Sprunger (f)
  - 800 m winners: (Poland) Adam Kszczot (m) / (Spain) Esther Guerrero Puigdevall (f)
  - 1500 m winners: (Djibouti) Ayanleh Souleiman (m) / (Ethiopia) Genzebe Dibaba (f)
  - Triple Jump winners: (Brazil) Almir dos Santos (m) / (Russia) Viktoriya Prokopenko (f)
  - Men's 60 m winner: (United States) Mike Rodgers
  - Men's Pole Vault winner: (Greece) Konstantinos Filippidis
  - Men's Shot Put winner: (Czech Republic) Tomáš Staněk
  - Women's 3000 m winner: (Sweden) Meraf Bahta
  - Women's High Jump winner: (Russia) Mariya Lasitskene
- February 10: New Balance Indoor Grand Prix in (United States) Boston
  - 400 m winners: (Trinidad and Tobago) Deon Lendore (m) / (United States) Shakima Wimbley (f)
  - 800 m winners: (United States) Donavan Brazier (m) / (Canada) Jenna Westaway (f)
  - 1500 m winners: (United Kingdom) Chris O'Hare (m) / (Ethiopia) Dawit Seyaum (f)
  - 3000 m winners: (Kenya) Edward Cheserek (m) / (United States) Jennifer Simpson (f)
  - Men's 60 m winner: (United States) Christian Coleman
  - Men's 300 m winner: (Trinidad and Tobago) Jereem Richards
  - Men's Triple Jump winner: (United States) Chris Carter
  - Women's 60 m Hurdles winner: (United States) Sharika Nelvis
  - Women's High Jump winner: (Sweden) Erika Kinsey
- February 15: Copernicus Cup in (Poland) Toruń
  - 60 m winners: (Slovakia) Ján Volko (m) / (Ivory Coast) Marie-Josée Ta Lou
  - 400 m winners: (Slovenia) Luka Janežič (m) / (Slovakia) Iveta Putalová
  - 800 m winners: (Poland) Adam Kszczot (m) / (Poland) } Angelika Cichocka
  - 1500 m winners: (Ethiopia) Taresa Tolosa (m) / (Morocco) Rababe Arafi
  - 60 m Hurdles winners: (Cyprus) Milan Trajkovic (m) / (Germany) Pamela Dutkiewicz
  - Men's Pole Vault winner: (Poland) Piotr Lisek
  - Men's Triple Jump winner: (Cuba) Cristian Nápoles
  - Men's Shot Put winner: (Poland) Konrad Bukowiecki
  - Women's High Jump winner: (Russia) Mariya Lasitskene
- February 25: Müller Indoor Grand Prix (final) in (United Kingdom) Glasgow
  - 60 m winners: (China) Su Bingtian (m) / (Ivory Coast) Marie-Josée Ta Lou (f)
  - 400 m winners: (United States) Fred Kerley (m) / (United States) Phyllis Francis (f)
  - 800 m winners: (Poland) Adam Kszczot (m) / (Latvia) Līga Velvere (f)
  - 1500 m winners: (Kenya) Bethwell Birgen (m) / (Kenya) Beatrice Chepkoech (f)
  - 60 m Hurdles winners: (Jamaica) Ronald Levy (m) / (United States) Christina Manning (f)
  - Long Jump winners: (China) Shi Yuhao (m) / (Sweden) Khaddi Sagnia (f)
  - Men's 3000 m winner: (Kenya) Justus Soget Kiplagat
  - Men's 3000 m Race Walk winner: (United Kingdom) Tom Bosworth
  - Women's High Jump winner: (Russia) Mariya Lasitskene
  - Women's Pole Vault winner: (Greece) Katerina Stefanidi

=== 2018 IAAF Combined Events Challenge ===
- April 27 & 28: Multistars in (Italy) Florence
  - Decathlon winner: (Norway) Martin Roe (8,228 points)
  - Heptathlon winner: (United States) Erica Bougard (6,327 points)
- May 26 & 27: Hypo-Meeting in (Austria) Götzis
  - Decathlon winner: (Canada) Damian Warner (8,795 points)
  - Heptathlon winner: (Belgium) Nafissatou Thiam (6,806 points)
- June 9 & 10: Oceania Combined Events Championships in (Australia) Townsville
- June 16 & 17: Mehrkampf-Meeting Ratingen in Germany
  - Decathlon winner: (Germany) Arthur Abele (8,481 points)
  - Heptathlon winner: (Germany) Carolin Schäfer (6,549 points)
- June 21 – 24: Part of the 2018 USA Outdoor Track and Field Championships in (United States) Des Moines
  - Decathlon winner: (Illinois) Zach Ziemek (8,294 points)
  - Heptathlon winner: (Tennessee) Erica Bougard (6,347 points)
- July 3 & 4: 2018 Pan American Combined Events Cup in (Canada) Ottawa
  - Decathlon winner: (United States) Scott Filip (7,643 points)
  - Heptathlon winner: (Canada) Georgia Ellenwood (6,026 points)
- August 7 – 12: Part of the 2018 European Athletics Championships in (Germany) Berlin
  - Decathlon winner: (Germany) Arthur Abele (8,431 points)
  - Heptathlon winner: (Belgium) Nafissatou Thiam (6,816 points)
- September 15 & 16: Décastar (final) in (France) Talence
  - Decathlon winner: (France) Kevin Mayer (9,126 points) (World Record)
  - Heptathlon winner: (Germany) Carolin Schäfer (6,457 points)

=== 2018 IAAF Cross Country Permit ===
- November 12, 2017: Cross de Atapuerca in (Spain) Burgos
  - Winners: (Ethiopia) Getaneh Molla (m) / (Ethiopia) Senbere Teferi (f)
- January 6: Campaccio in (Italy) San Giorgio su Legnano
  - Winners: (Kenya) James Kibet (m) / (Kenya) Lilian Rengeruk (f)
- January 6: Antrim International Cross Country in Great Britain
  - Winners: (Kenya) Timothy Cheruiyot (m) / (Kenya) Margaret Chelimo Kipkemboi (f)
- January 14: Cross Internacional Juan Muguerza in (Spain) Elgoibar
  - Winners: (Ethiopia) Selemon Barega / (Bahrain) Ruth Jebet (f)
- January 21: Cross Internacional de Itálica in (Spain) Seville
  - Winners: (Uganda) Joshua Cheptegei (m) / (Kenya) Agnes Jebet Tirop (f)
- February 11: Cinque Mulini in (Italy) San Vittore Olona
  - Winners: (Uganda) Jacob Kiplimo (m) / (Ethiopia) Letesenbet Gidey (f)
- February 18: Almond Blossom Cross Country (final) in (Portugal) Albufeira
  - Winners: (Morocco) Soufianne El Bakkali (m) / (Portugal) Salomé Rocha (f)

=== 2018 IAAF Race Walking Challenge ===
- February 11: 2018 Oceania Race Walking Championships in (Australia) Adelaide
  - 20 km Walk winners: (Sweden) Perseus Karlström (m) / (Australia) Beki Smith (f)
- February 24 & 25: Memorial Jerzy Hausleber in (Mexico) Monterrey
  - 20 km Walk winners: (South Africa) Lebogang Shange (m) / (Mexico) Lupita González (f)
  - 50 km Walk winners: (Ecuador) Andrés Chocho (m) / (Mexico) Erika Jazmine Morales (f)
- March 10: 2018 South American Race Walking Championships in (Ecuador) Sucúa
  - 20 km Walk winners: (Ecuador) Andrés Chocho (m) / (Brazil) Érica de Sena (f)
  - 50 km Walk winners: (Colombia) James Rendón (m) / (Ecuador) Magaly Bonilla (f)
- April 7: Grande Prémio Internacional de Rio Maior em Marcha Atlética in Portugal
  - 20 km Walk winners: (Spain) Diego García (m) / (China) Qieyang Shenjie (f)
- June 2: Gran Premio Cantones de La Coruña in Spain
  - 20 km Walk winners: (Colombia) Éider Arévalo (m) / (China) Qieyang Shenjie (f)
- September 23 – 26: Around Taihu International Race Walking 2018 in (China) Suzhou
  - 20 km Walk winners: (Colombia) Éider Arévalo (m) / (China) Wang Yingliu (f)

=== 2018 IAAF Road Race Label Events (Gold) ===
- January 7: Xiamen International Marathon in China
  - Winners: (Ethiopia) Dejene Debela (m) / (Ethiopia) Fatuma Sado (f)
- January 14: Houston Half Marathon in the United States
  - Winners: (New Zealand) Jake Robertson (m) / (Ethiopia) Ruti Aga (f)
- January 21: Hong Kong Marathon in Hong Kong
  - Winners: (Kenya) Kenneth Mburu Mungara (m) / (Ethiopia) Gulume Tollesa (f)
- January 26: Dubai Marathon in the United Arab Emirates
  - Winners: (Ethiopia) Mosinet Geremew (m) / (Ethiopia) Roza Dereje (f)
- January 28: Osaka International Ladies Marathon in Japan (women only)
  - Winner: (Japan) Mizuki Matsuda
- February 11: eDreams Mitja Marató de Barcelona in Spain
  - Winners: (Ethiopia) Mule Wasihun (m) / (Bahrain) Tejitu Daba (f)
- February 25: Seville Marathon in Spain
  - Winners: (Kenya) Dickson Tuwei Kipsang (m) / (Morocco) Koutar Boulaid (f)
- March 4: Lake Biwa Marathon in Japan (men only)
  - Winner: (Kenya) Joseph Macharia Ndirangu
- March 11: Roma-Ostia Half Marathon in Italy
  - Winners: (United States) Galen Rupp (m) / (Ethiopia) Haftamenesh Tesfay Haylu (f)
- March 11: Nagoya Women's Marathon in Japan (women only)
  - Winner: (Ethiopia) Meskerem Assefa
- March 11: Lisbon Half Marathon in Portugal
  - Winners: (Kenya) Erick Kiptanui (m) / (Ethiopia) Etagegn Woldu (f)
- March 18: Seoul International Marathon in South Korea
  - Winners: (Kenya) Wilson Loyanae (m) / (Ethiopia) Damte Hiru (f)
- March 25: Chongqing International Marathon in China
  - Winners: (Kenya) Kennedy Cheboror (m) / (Ethiopia) Meseret Legese (f)
- April 7: Prague Half Marathon in the Czech Republic
  - Winners: (Kenya) Benard Kimeli (m) / (Kenya) Joan Melly (f)
- April 8: Paris Marathon in France
  - Winners: (Kenya) Paul Lonyangata (m) / (Kenya) Betsy Saina (f)
- April 8: Rotterdam Marathon in the Netherlands
  - Winners: (Kenya) Kenneth Kipkemoi (m) / (Kenya) Visiline Jepkesho (f)
- April 8: Istanbul Half Marathon in Turkey
  - Winners: (Ethiopia) Amdework Walelegn (m) / (Ethiopia) Ababel Yeshaneh (f)
- April 22: Vienna City Marathon in Austria
  - Winners: (Morocco) Salaheddine Bounasser (m) / (Kenya) Nancy Kiprop (f)
- April 22: Gifu Seiryu Half Marathon in Japan
  - Winners: (Kenya) Nicholas Kosimbei (m) / (Ethiopia) Degitu Azmeraw (f)
- April 22: Yangzhou Jianzhen International Half Marathon in China
  - Winners: (Ethiopia) Mosinet Geremew (m) / (Ethiopia) Ababel Yeshaneh (f)
- April 22: Madrid Marathon in Spain
  - Winners: (Kenya) Eliud Kiplagat Barngetuny (m) / (Kenya) Valentine Kipketer (f)
- May 5: Yellow River Estuary International Marathon in China
  - Winners: (Kenya) Joel Kemboi Kimurer (m) / (Ethiopia) Letebrhan Haylay (f)
- May 6: Prague Marathon in the Czech Republic
  - Winners: (United States) Galen Rupp (m) / (Kenya) Bornes Jepkirui Kitur (f)
- May 19: Karlovy Vary Half Marathon in the Czech Republic
  - Winners: (Ukraine) Roman Romanenko (m) / (Czech Republic) Eva Vrabcová-Nývltová (f)
- May 26 & 27: Ottawa Race Weekend in Canada
  - Ottawa 10 km winners: (Ethiopia) Andamlak Berta (m) / (United Arab Emirates) Alia Saeed Mohammed (f)
  - Ottawa Marathon winners: (Ethiopia) Yemane Tsegay (m) / (Ethiopia) Gelete Burka (f)
- May 27: World 10K Bangalore in India
  - Winners: (Kenya) Geoffrey Kipsang Kamworor (m) / (Kenya) Agnes Jebet Tirop (f)
- June 2: České Budějovice Half Marathon in Czech Republic
  - Winners: (United Kingdom) Luke Traynor (m) / (Moldova) Lilia Fisikowici (f)
- June 10: Lanzhou International Marathon in China
  - Winners: (Ethiopia) Kelkile Gezahegn (m) / (Bahrain) Merima Mohammed (f)
- June 23: Olomouc Half Marathon in Czech Republic
  - Winners: (Kenya) Stephen Kiprop (m) / (Ethiopia) Netsanet Gudeta (f)
- July 1: Gold Coast Marathon in Australia
  - Winners: (Kenya) Kenneth Mburu Mungara (m) / (Kenya) Ruth Chebitok (f)
- July 29: Bogotá Half Marathon in Colombia
  - Winners: (Ethiopia) Betesfa Getahun (m) / (Ethiopia) Netsanet Gudeta (f)
- September 8: Prague Grand Prix in Czech Republic
  - Winners: (Kenya) Rhonex Kipruto (m) / (Kenya) Caroline Chepkoech Kipkirui (f)
- September 15: Ústí nad Labem Half Marathon in Czech Republic
  - Winners: (Kenya) Stephen Kiprop (m) / (Kenya) Diana Chemtai Kipyokei (f)
- September 16: Copenhagen Half Marathon in Denmark
  - Winners: (Kenya) Daniel Kipchumba (m) / (Netherlands) Sifan Hassan (f)
- September 16: Sydney Marathon in Australia
  - Winners: (Kenya) Elijah Kemboi (m) / (Kenya) Mercy Kibarus (f)
- September 16: Beijing Marathon in China
  - Winners: (Ethiopia) Dejene Debela (m) / (Kenya) Valary Jemeli Aiyabei (f)
- September 23: Cape Town Marathon in South Africa
  - Winners: (South Africa) Stephen Mokoka (m) / (Namibia) Helalia Johannes (f)
- October 14: Portugal Half Marathon in Portugal
  - Winners: (Morocco) Mustapha El Aziz (m) / (Ethiopia) Yebrgual Melese Arage (f)
- October 21: Amsterdam Marathon in Netherlands
  - Winners: (Kenya) Lawrence Cherono (m) / (Ethiopia) Tadelech Bekele (f)
- October 21: Delhi Half Marathon in India
  - Winners: (Ethiopia) Andamlak Belihu (m) / (Ethiopia) Tsehay Gemechu (f)
- October 21: Toronto Waterfront Marathon in Canada
  - Winners: (Kenya) Benson Kipruto (m) / (Bahrain) Mimi Belete (f)
- October 28: Frankfurt Marathon in Germany
  - Winners: (Ethiopia) Kelkile Gezahegn (m) / (Ethiopia) Meskerem Assefa (f)
- October 28: Valencia Half Marathon in Spain
  - Winners: (Kenya) Abraham Kiptum (m) / (Ethiopia) Gelete Burka (f)
- November 11: Istanbul Marathon in Turkey
  - Winners: (Kenya) Felix Kimutai (m) / (Kenya) Ruth Chepngetich (f)
- November 18: Shanghai Marathon in China
  - Winners: (Ethiopia) Abdiwak Tura (m) / (Ethiopia) Yebrgual Melese (f)
- December 2: Fukuoka Marathon in Japan (men only)
  - Winner: (Japan) Yuma Hattori
- December 2: Valencia Marathon in Spain
  - Winners: (Ethiopia) Leul Gebrselassie (m) / (Ethiopia) Ashete Dido (f)
- December 9: Guangzhou Marathon in China
  - Winners: (Morocco) Mohammed Ziani (m) / (Ethiopia) Tigist Girma (f)
- December 9: Singapore Marathon in Singapore
  - Winners: (Kenya) Joshua Kipkorir (m) / (Kenya) Priscah Jepleting Cherono (f)

=== 2018 IAAF Road Race Label Events (Silver) ===
- January 14: Houston Marathon in the United States
  - Winners: (Ethiopia) Bazu Worku (m) / (Ethiopia) Biruktayit Degefa (f)
- January 21: Mumbai Marathon in India
  - Winners: (Ethiopia) Solomon Deksisa (m) / (Ethiopia) Amane Gobena (f)
- February 4: Kagawa Marugame Half Marathon in Japan
  - Winners: (Kenya) Edward Waweru (m) / (Kenya) Betsy Saina (f)
- March 18: New Taipei City Wan Jin Shi Marathon in Chinese Taipei
  - Winners: (Japan) Yuki Kawauchi (m) / (Kenya) Nguriatukei Rael Kiyara (f)
- April 1: Daegu Marathon in South Korea
  - Winners: (Kenya) Abraham Kiptum (m) / (Kenya) Janet Rono (f)
- April 8: Hannover Marathon in Germany
  - Winners: (Ethiopia) Seboka Negussa (m) / (Kenya) Agnes Kiprop (f)
- April 8: Milano City Marathon in Italy
  - Winners: (Ethiopia) Seyefu Tura (m) / (Kenya) Lucy Wangui Kabuu (f)
- April 8: Rome Marathon in Italy
  - Winners: (Kenya) Cosmas Kipchoge Birech (m) / (Ethiopia) Rahma Tusa (f)
- April 22: Orlen Warsaw Marathon in Poland
  - Winners: (Kenya) Ezekiel Omullo (m) / (Belarus) Nastassia Ivanova (f)
- May 12: Okpekpe Intn'l 10 km Road Race in Nigeria
  - Winners: (Kenya) Alex Kibet (m) / (Ethiopia) Dera Dida (f)
- August 26: Mexico City Marathon in Mexico
  - Winners: (Kenya) Titus Ekiru (m) / (Ethiopia) Etaferahu Temesgen (f)
- September 8: Taiyuan International Marathon in China
  - Winners: (Kenya) Ezekial Kemboi Omullo (m) / (Kenya) Alice Jepkemboi Kimutai (f)
- September 23: Dam tot Damloop in Netherlands
  - Winners: (Uganda) Joshua Cheptegei (m) / (Israel) Lonah Chemtai Salpeter (f)
- September 29: Hengshui Lake International Marathon in China
  - Winners: (Ethiopia) Lemi Berhanu Hayle (m) / (Ethiopia) Waganesh Mekasha (f)
- October 7: Cardiff Half Marathon in Great Britain
  - Winners: (Australia) Jack Raynor (m) / (Uganda) Juliet Chekwel (f)
- October 7: Košice Peace Marathon in Slovakia
  - Winners: (Kenya) Raymond Choge (m) / (Kenya) Milliam Ebongon (f)
- October 14: Lisbon Marathon in Portugal
  - Winners: (Ethiopia) Limenih Getachew (m) / (Ethiopia) Kuftu Dadiso Tahir (f)
- October 14: 20 Kilomètres de Paris in France
  - Winners: (Eritrea) Samuel Tsegay (m) / (France) Ophélie Claude-Boxberger (f)
- October 28: Ljubljana Marathon in Slovenia
  - Winners: (Ethiopia) Sisay Lemma (m) / (Kenya) Visiline Jepkesho (f)
- October 28: Marseille-Cassis Classique Internationale in France
  - Winners: (Ethiopia) Olika Adugna (m) / (Ethiopia) Gete Alemayehu (f)
- November 4: Hangzhou International Marathon in China
  - Winners: (Kenya) Michael Njenga Kunyuga (m) / (Ethiopia) Hirut Tibedu (f)
- November 11: Beirut Marathon in Lebanon
  - Winners: (Morocco) Mohamed Reda El Aaraby (m) / (Ethiopia) Medina Deme Armino (f)
- December 9: Saitama International Marathon in Japan (Women only)
  - Winner: (Bahrain) Dalila Abdulkadir
- December 16: Shenzhen Marathon in China
  - Winners: (Kenya) Edwin Kipngetich Koech (m) / (Ethiopia) Mulu Seboka (f)
- December 30: Corrida de Houilles in France
  - Winners: (Switzerland) Julien Wanders (m) / (Ethiopia) Gete Alemayehu (f)
- December 31: San Silvestre Vallecana in Spain
  - Winners: (Uganda) Jacob Kiplimo (m) / (Kenya) Brigid Kosgei (f)

=== 2018 IAAF Road Race Label Events (Bronze) ===
- February 10: Lagos Marathon in Nigeria
  - Winners: (France) Abraham Kiprotich (m) / (Ethiopia) Almenesh Herpha (f)
- February 18: Medio Maratón Internacional Electrolit Guadalajara in Mexico
  - Winners: (Kenya) John Nzau Mwangangi (m) / (Kenya) Diana Chemtai Kipyokei (f)
- March 11: Barcelona Marathon in Spain
  - Winners: (Kenya) Anthony Maritim (m) / (Kenya) Ruth Chebitok (f)
- March 18: ONICO Gdynia Half Marathon in Poland
  - Winners: (Uganda) Ben Somikwo (m) / (Kenya) Christine Oigo (f)
- March 25: PZU Pólmaraton Warszawski in Poland
  - Winners: (Kenya) Ezrah Sang (m) / (Kenya) Pauline Njeru (f)
- April 8: Pyongyang Marathon in North Korea
  - Winners: (North Korea) RI Kang-pom (m) / (North Korea) Kim Hye-song (f)
- April 15: Nagano Olympic Commemorative Marathon in Japan
  - Winners: (Ethiopia) Abdela Godana (m) / (Japan) Asami Furuse (f)
- April 15: DOZ Marathon Łódz in Poland
  - Winners: (Ethiopia) Tarekegn Zewdu (m) / (Kenya) Jane Kiptoo (f)
- April 22: Nova Poshta Kyiv Half Marathon in Ukraine
  - Winners: (Ethiopia) Lencho Tesfaye Anbesa (m) / (Ukraine) Viktoriya Kalyuzhna (f)
- May 6: Geneva Marathon in Switzerland
  - Winners: (Kenya) William Yegon (m) / (Ethiopia) Amelework Fekadu (f)
- May 13: Dalian International Marathon in China
  - Winners: (Kenya) Edwin Kibet Koech (m) / (Ethiopia) Mulu Seboka (f)
- May 20: Riga Marathon in Latvia
  - Winners: (Ethiopia) Ayana Tsedat (m) / (Kenya) Georgina Rono (f)
- June 16: Corrida de Langueux in France
  - Winners: (Kenya) Moses Kibet (m) / (France) Clémence Calvin (f)
- June 23: Vidovdan Road Race in Bosnia and Herzegovina
  - Winners: (Kenya) Moses Kibet (m) / (Belarus) Katsiaryna Shaban Karneyenka (f)
- September 9: Minsk Half Marathon in Belarus
  - Winners: (Ethiopia) Abebe Degefa Negewo (m) / (Kenya) Sheila Jerotich (f)
- September 23: Buenos Aires Marathon in Argentina
  - Winners: (Kenya) Emmanuel Saina (m) / (Kenya) Vivian Kiplagat Jerono (f)
- September 30: Warsaw Marathon in Poland
  - Winners: (Kenya) David Metto (m) / (Kenya) Beatrice Cherop (f)
- October 14: Bucharest Marathon in Romania
  - Winners: (Kenya) Hosea Kipkemboi (m) / (Ethiopia) Almaz Gelana (f)
- October 14: PKO Poznan Marathon in Poland
  - Winners: (Kenya) Cosmas Mutuku Kyeva (m) / (Ethiopia) Tesfanesh Merga (f)
- October 28: Venice Marathon in Italy
  - Winners: (Ethiopia) Ayenew Gebre (m) / (Kenya) Angela Tanui (f)
- November 4: French Riviera Marathon in France
  - Winners: (Ethiopia) Abrha Milaw (m) / (Ethiopia) Nurit Yimam (f)
- November 4: Porto Marathon in Portugal
  - Winners: (Uganda) Robert Chemonges (m) / (Ethiopia) Abeba Tekulu Gebremeskel (f)
- November 11: Maratón Internacional Megacable Guadalajara in Mexico
  - Winners: (Kenya) Silas Cheboit (m) / (Ethiopia) Zewdnesh Ayele Belachew (f)
- November 11: Hefei International Marathon in China
  - Winners: (Kenya) Leonard Langat (m) / (Kenya) Magdalene Masai (f)
- November 18: Kobe Marathon in Japan
  - Winners: (Morocco) Khalil Lemciyeh (m) / (Kenya) Susan Jerotich (f)
- November 18: Boulogne-Billancourt Half Marathon in France
  - Winners: (Ethiopia) Taye Girma (m) / (Kenya) Parendis Lekapana (f)
- November 25: Florence Marathon in Italy
  - Winners: (Bahrain) Ali Abdi Gelelchu (m) / (Israel) Lonah Chemtai Salpeter (f)
- December 2: Marathon du Gabon Olam in Gabon
  - Winners: (Kenya) Shedrack Kimayo (m) / (Kenya) Joan Kigen (f)
- December 2: 10K Valencia Trinidad Alfonso in Spain
  - Winners: (Sweden) Jonas Leanderson (m) / (Kenya) Susan Jeptoo (f)
- December 16: Bangsaen21 Half Marathon in Thailand
  - Winners: (Kenya) Jamin Ekai Ngaukon (m) / (Kenya) Chemtai Rionotukei (f)
- December 16: Mersin Marathon in Turkey
  - Winners: (Kenya) Kenneth Kiplagat Limo (m) / (Ethiopia) Konjit Tilahun (f)
- December 16: Tata Steel Kolkata 25K in India
  - Winners: (Ethiopia) Birhanu Legese (m) / (Ethiopia) Dibaba Kuma (f)

=== EA Major Competitions ===
- February 4: 2018 European Champion Clubs Cup Cross Country in (Portugal) Mira
  - Men's winners: (Portugal) Sporting CP (Davis Kiplangat, Pedro Silva, Rui Teixeira, Licinio Pimentel, Bruno Albuquerque) (m)
  - Women's winners: (Poland) Podlasie Białystok (Katarzyna Rutkowska, Paulina Mikiewicz-Łapińska, Paula Kopciewska, Izabela Parszczyńska) (f)
- February 10: 2018 Balkan U20 Indoor Championships in Athletics in (Bulgaria) Sofia
  - 60 m winners: (Bulgaria) Vesselin Jivkov (m) / (Romania) Marina Andreea Baboi (f)
  - 60 m hurdles winners: (Romania) Alexandru Ionuț Iconaru (m) / (Slovenia) Nika Glojnarič (f)
  - 400 m winners: (Croatia) Sven Cepuš (m) / (Romania) Andrea Miklós (f)
  - 800 m winners: (Croatia) Marino Bloudek (m) / (Romania) Diana Elena Bogos (f)
  - 1500 m winners: (Romania) Adrian Garcea (m) / (Bulgaria) Silviya Georgieva (f)
  - 3000 m winners: (Serbia) Elzan Bibić (m) / (Turkey) Urkuş Işik (f)
  - High Jump winners: (Serbia) Jasmin Halili (m) / (Greece) Panagiota Dosi (f)
  - Long Jump winners: (Greece) Panagiotis Mantzourogiannis (m) / (Croatia) Klara Barnjak (f)
  - Triple Jump winners: (Romania) Cristian Răzvan Grecu (m) / (Bulgaria) Aleksandra Nacheva (f)
  - Pole Vault winners: (Israel) Maxim Goldovsky (m) / (Slovenia) Nastja Modič (f)
  - Shot Put winners: (Greece) Odysseas Mouzenidis (m) / (Greece) Maria Magkoulia (f)
  - 4 × 400 m winners: Turkey (Ömer Karlidağ, Abdullah Özdemir, Ilyas Çanakçi, Mehmet Çelik) (m) / Romania (Adina Cârciogel, Iulia Banaga, Maria Scrob, Diana Elena Bogos) (f)
- February 17: 2018 Balkan Athletics Indoor Championships in (Turkey) Istanbul
- March 10 & 11: 2018 European Throwing Cup (Portugal) Leiria
- March 10 & 11: 2018 Balkan Masters Indoor Championships in (Serbia) Belgrade
- March 18: 2018 Balkan Marathon Championships in (Cyprus) Limassol
- April 14: Balkan Race Walking Championships in (Serbia) Pirot
- May 5: Balkan Mountain Running Championships in (Serbia) Beočin
- May 26 – 27: European Champion Clubs Cup Track and Field Senior Group A in (United Kingdom) Birmingham
- May 26 – 27: ECCC Track and Field Senior Group B in (Finland) Tampere
- June 3: 22nd 2018 European Cup 10,000m in (United Kingdom) London
- June 9: Championships of the Small States of Europe in (Liechtenstein) Schaan
- June 9: Balkan U18 Championships in Athletics in (Turkey) Istanbul
- June 9 & 10: 2018 Mediterranean Athletics U23 Championships in (Italy) Jesolo
- June 14 & 15: Balkan Relay Championships in (Turkey) Erzurum
- June 23 & 24: Balkan U20 Championships in Athletics in (Turkey) Bursa
- July 1: 17th 2018 European Mountain Running Championships in (North Macedonia) Skopje
- July 5 – 8: 2nd 2018 European Athletics U18 Championships in (Hungary) Győr
- July 20 & 21: 2018 Balkan Athletics Championships in (Bulgaria) Stara Zagora
- September 15: ECCC Track and Field U20 in TBD place
- September 16: Balkan Half Marathon Championships in (Bosnia and Herzegovina) Sarajevo
- November 4: Balkan Cross Country Championships in (Romania) Botoșani
- December 9: 25th 2018 European Cross Country Championships in (Netherlands) Tilburg

=== EA Cross Country Permit Races ===
- September 22 – 24, 2017: Lidingöloppet in (Sweden) Lidingö
  - Winners: (Sweden) Napoleon Solomon (m) / (Sweden) Maria Larsson (f)
- November 11, 2017: European Halloween Cross in (Denmark) Middelfart
  - Winners: (Sweden) Napoleon Solomon (m) / (Sweden) Sara Christiansson (f)
- November 11, 2017: Pforzheim-Huchenfeld Cross in (Germany) Pforzheim
  - Winners: (Germany) Patrick Karl (m) / (Germany) Elena Burkard (f)
- November 18, 2017: Wyndham Grand CrossAttack in (Austria) Salzburg
  - Winners: (Germany) Richard Ringer (m) / (Czech Republic) Simona Vrzalová (f)
- November 19, 2017: XXIV Cross Internacional de Soria in (Spain) Soria
  - Winners: (Uganda) Jacob Kiplimo (m) / (Kenya) Alice Aprot Nawowuna (f)
- November 19, 2017: Cross de l'Acier in (France) Leffrinckoucke
  - Winners: (Bahrain) Birhanu Balew Yemataw (m) / (Kenya) Margaret Chelimo Kipkemboi (f)
- November 25, 2017: 62nd Omer Besim Memorial in (Turkey) Istanbul
  - Winners: (Kenya) Bernard Cheruiyot Sang (m) / (Ethiopia) Meseret Yaye Asefa (f)
- November 26, 2017: Darmstadt Cross in (Germany) Darmstadt
  - Winners: (Germany) Amanal Petros (m) / (Germany) Alina Reh (f)
- November 26, 2017: International Warandecross in (Netherlands) Tilburg
  - Winners: (Sweden) Napoleon Solomon (m) / (Sweden) Meraf Bahta (f)
- November 26, 2017: Cross Internacional de la Constitución in (Spain) Alcobendas
  - Winners: (Morocco) Zakaria Maazouzi (m) / (Spain) Clara Viñarás (f)
- January 13: Great Edinburgh International Cross Country in (United Kingdom) Edinburgh
  - Winners: (United States) Leonard Essau Korir (m) / (Turkey) Yasemin Can (f)
- January 19 – 21: Abdycross in (Netherlands) Kerkrade
  - Winners: (Spain) Chakib Lachgar (m) / (Kenya) Sylvia Mboga Medugu (f)
- January 21: Lotto Cross Cup de Hannut in (Belgium) Hannut
  - Winners: (Belgium) Soufiane Bouchikhi (m) / (Ethiopia) Birtukan Adamu (f)
- January 21: Cross della Vallagarina in (Italy) Villa Lagarina
  - Winners: (Ethiopia) Telahun Haile Bekele (m) / (Kenya) Norah Jeruto (f)
- February 25: Lotto Cross Cup (final) in (Belgium) Brussels

=== EA Indoor Permit Meetings ===
- January 25: Czech Indoor Gala in (Czech Republic) Ostrava
  - 60 m winners: (Cuba) Yunier Perez (m) / (Poland) Ewa Swoboda (f)
  - 300 m winners: (Czech Republic) Pavel Maslák (m) / (Slovenia) Anita Horvat (f)
  - Men's 60 m Hurdles winner: (Czech Republic) Petr Svoboda
  - 3000 m winners: (Bahrain) Mohammed Ayoub Tiouali (m) / (Kenya) Hellen Obiri
  - Long Jump winners: (Greece) Miltiádis Tentóglou (m) / (Greece) Háido Alexoúli (f)
  - Pole Vault winners: (Greece) Emmanouil Karalis (m) / (Czech Republic) Romana Maláčová (f)
  - Women's High Jump winner: (Ukraine) Iryna Herashchenko
  - Men's Shot Put winner: (Czech Republic) Tomáš Staněk
- February 2 & 3: European Athletics Permit meeting Combined Events in (Estonia) Tallinn
  - Men's Heptathlon winner: (Germany) Kai Kazmirek
  - Men's U20 Heptathlon winner: (Estonia) Hendrik Lillemets
  - Women's Pentathlon winner: (Ukraine) Alina Shukh
- February 3: Reykjavik International Games in (Iceland) Reykjavík
  - 60 m winners: (Sweden) Odain Rose (m) / (United Kingdom) Diani Walker (f)
  - 400 m winners: (United States) Marquis Caldwell (m) / (Iceland) Arna Stefanía Gudmundsdóttir (f)
  - 800 m winners: (Iceland) Sæmundur Ólafsson (m) / (Kenya) Emily Jerotich (f)
  - Women's High Jump winner: (Sweden) Maja Nilsson
  - Pole Vault winners: (Iceland) Bjarki Gíslason (m) / (Iceland) Hulda Thorsteinsdóttir (f)
  - Long Jump winners: (Iceland) Kristinn Torfason (m) / (Finland) Anne-Mari Lehtiö (f)
  - Shot Put winners: (United Kingdom) Scott Lincoln (m) / (Iceland) Thelma Lind Kristjánsdóttir
- February 3: Meeting Elite en Salle de Mondeville in (France) Mondeville
  - 60 m winners: (France) Christophe Lemaitre (m) / (Jamaica) Remona Burchell (f)
  - Women's 400 m winner: (Slovakia) Iveta Putalová
  - Men's 1500 m winner: (Ethiopia) Samuel Tefera
  - Women's 2000 m winner: (Ethiopia) Meskerem Mamo
  - Men's 3000 m winner: (United Kingdom) Jonathan Davies
  - 60 m Hurdles winners: (United States) Jarret Eaton (m) / (Ukraine) Hanna Plotitsyna (f)
  - Men's Triple Jump winner: (United Kingdom) Nathan Douglas
  - Women's Pole Vault winner: (France) Ninon Guillon-Romarin
- February 7: Meeting de Paris Indoor in (France) Paris
  - 60 m winners: (Ivory Coast) Arthur Gue Cissé (m) / (Ivory Coast) Marie-Josée Ta Lou (f)
  - 60 m Hurdles winners: (United States) Jarret Eaton (m) / (Ukraine) Hanna Plotitsyna (f)
  - Men's Long Jump winner: (South Africa) Luvo Manyonga
  - Women's Pole Vault winner: (Greece) Ekateríni Stefanídi
  - Men's Triathlon winner: (France) Kevin Mayer
- February 9: Meeting Féminin du Val d'Oise in (France) Eaubonne
  - Women's 60 m winner: (Ivory Coast) Marie-Josée Ta Lou
  - Women's 200 m winner: (Poland) Anna Kiełbasińska
  - Women's Triathlon winner: (Belgium) Nafissatou Thiam
  - Women's 800 m winner: (Ethiopia) Habitam Alemu
  - Women's 3000 m winner: (United Kingdom) Melissa Courtney
  - Women's 60 m Hurdles winner: (Finland) Nooralotta Neziri
  - Women's High Jump winner: (United Kingdom) Katarina Johnson-Thompson
  - Women's Pole Vault winner: (Russia) Anzhelika Sidorova
  - Women's Long Jump winner: (Latvia) Lauma Grīva
- February 10: Gugl Indoor Meeting in (Austria) Linz
  - 60 m winners: (Czech Republic) Zdenek Stromšík (m) / (Czech Republic) Klára Seidlová (f)
  - Women's 200 m winner: (Czech Republic) Marcela Pírková
  - Men's 400 m winner: (Turkey) Yavuz Can
  - Women's 800 m winner: (Italy) Irene Baldessari
  - 60 m Hurdles winners: (Brazil) Silvio Henrique de Souza (m) / (Croatia) Ivana Lončarek (f)
  - Pole Vault winners: (Latvia) Mareks Ārents (m) / (Czech Republic) Amálie Švábíková (f)
  - Women's Long Jump winner: (Austria) Ivona Dadic
  - Men's Triple Jump winner: (Turkey) Necati Er
- February 10: IFAM Indoor Meeting in (Belgium) Ghent
  - 60 m winners: (Belgium) Robin Vanderbemden (m) / (Netherlands) Jamile Samuel (f)
  - 400 m winners: (Netherlands) Tony van Diepen (m) / (United Kingdom) Zoey Clark (f)
  - 800 m winners: (Netherlands) Maarten Plaum (m) / (Italy) Elena Bellò (f)
  - 1500 m winners: (Poland) Marcin Lewandowski (m) / (Ethiopia) Alemaz Teshale (f)
  - Men's 3000 m winner: (Ethiopia) Regasa Chala
  - 60 m Hurdles winners: (Italy) Simone Poccia (m) / (Netherlands) Eefje Boons (f)
  - High Jump winners: (Japan) Naoto Tobe (m) / (Republic of Ireland) Sommer Lecky (f)
  - Pole Vault winners: (Netherlands) Koen van der Wijst (m) / (Netherlands) Robin Wingbermühle (f)
  - Long Jump winners: (Republic of Ireland) Adam McMullen (m) / (Netherlands) Hanne Maudens (f)
- February 11: Meeting Elite en Salle de Metz in (France) Metz
  - 60 m winners: (Jamaica) Kimmari Roach (m) / (Ivory Coast) Marie Josée Ta Lou (f)
  - Men's 200 m winner: (France) Christophe Lemaitre
  - Women's 300 m winner: (Switzerland) Sarah Atcho
  - 800 m winners: (France) Clement Dhainaut (m) / (Kenya) Nelly Jepkosgei (f)
  - Men's 1500 m winner: (Ethiopia) Taresa Tolosa
  - Men's 3000 m winner: (Burundi) Thierry Ndikumwenayo
  - 60 m Hurdles winners: (Cuba) Roger Iribarne (m) / (Finland) Nooralotta Neziri (f)
  - Men's Long Jump winner: (South Africa) Luvo Manyonga
  - Women's Triple Jump winner: (Greece) Paraskeví Papahrístou
- February 13: Meeting Arena Liévin in (France) Liévin
  - 60 m winners: (Bahrain) Andrew Fisher (m) / (Brazil) Rosângela Santos (f)
  - 300 m winners: (Belgium) Jonathan Borlée (m) / (Latvia) Gunta Latiševa-Čudare (f)
  - 800 m winners: (Poland) Adam Kszczot (m) / (Ethiopia) Habitam Alemu (f)
  - Men's 1000 m winner: (France) Pierre-Ambroise Bosse
  - 1500 m winners: (Djibouti) Ayanleh Souleiman (m) / (Morocco) Rababe Arafi (f)
  - Men's 3000 m winner: (Ethiopia) Selemon Barega
  - 60 m Hurdles winners: (France) Ludovic Payen (m) / (Ukraine) Hanna Plotitsyna (f)
  - Pole Vault winners: (China) Xue Changrui (m) / (Greece) Ekateríni Stefanídi (f)
  - Men's Triple Jump winner: (Brazil) Almir dos Santos
- February 18: Istanbul Cup Indoor Athletics Meeting in (Turkey) Istanbul
  - 60 m winners: (Turkey) Emre Zafer Barnes (m) / (Ukraine) Hrystyna Stuy (f)
  - 400 m winners: (Bosnia and Herzegovina) Amel Tuka (m) / (Ukraine) Anna Ryzhykova (f)
  - Men's 1000 m winner: (Bahrain) Abraham Rotich
  - Women's 1500 m winner: (Albania) Luiza Gega
  - Men's 3000 m winner: (Cyprus) Amine Khadiri
  - Women's 60 m Hurdles winner: (Ukraine) Hanna Plotitsyna
  - Men's Long Jump winner: (Ukraine) Vladyslav Mazur
  - Women's High Jump winner: (Ukraine) Kateryna Tabashnyk
  - Women's Pole Vault winner: (Turkey) Demet Parlak
  - Women's Triple Jump winner: (Russia) Viktoriya Prokopenko
  - Men's Shot Put winner: (Romania) Andrei Gag
- February 21: AIT International Grand Prix in (Republic of Ireland) Anthlone
- February 21: Serbian Open Indoor Meeting in (Serbia) Belgrade
- February 25: All Star Perche in (France) Clermont-Ferrand
- TBD: Meeting Ville de Madrid in (Spain) Madrid

=== EA Outdoor Classic Meetings ===
- May 29: 16th European Athletics Festival Bydgoszcz in (Poland) Bydgoszcz
- June 2: Meeting of Andújar in (Spain) Andújar
- June 4: Memoriál Josefa Odložila in (Czech Republic) Prague
- June 8: 12th Meeting Iberoamericano de Atletismo in (Spain) Huelva
- June 8: 63rd Janusz Kusociński Memorial in (Poland) Szczecin
- June 13: Meeting de Montreuil in France
- June 16: Meeting de Marseille Pro Athlé Tour in (France) Marseille

=== EA Outdoor Area Permit Meetings ===
- May 5 & 6: Georgian Open Championships in (Georgia (country)) Tbilisi
- May 13: Meeting Elite de Montgeron in (France) Montgeron
- May 19 & 20: Caucasian Cup in (Georgia (country)) Tbilisi
- May 27: Meeting Elite de Forbach in (France) Forbach

=== EA Combined Events Area Permit Meetings ===
- June 2 & 3: VII Meeting Internacional de Arona in (Spain) Arona

=== EA Outdoor Special Premium Meetings ===
- May 10: Athens Street Pole Vault (Special Premium) in (Greece) Athens

=== CAA Major Events ===
- March 17: 2018 African Cross Country Championships in (Algeria) Chlef
- August 1 – 5: 2018 African Championships in Athletics in (Nigeria) Asaba

=== NACAC Major Events ===
- February 16 & 17: 2018 Central American Cross Country Championships in (El Salvador) San Salvador
  - Seniors winners: (Guatemala) Alberto González Méndez (m) / (Costa Rica) Jenny Méndez Suanca (f)
  - U20 winners: (El Salvador) Joseph Alejandro Hernandez Silva (m) / (Costa Rica) Noelia Vargas Mena (f)
- February 17: Pan American Cross Country Cup in (El Salvador) San Salvador
  - Seniors winners: (United States) Joseph Gray (m) / (Ecuador) Carmen Toaquiza (f)
  - U20 winners: (United States) Connor Lane (m) / (Canada) Brogan MacDougall (f)
- May 25 – 27: 2018 Central American Junior and Youth Championships in Athletics in Panama City
- June 22 – 24: 2018 Central American Senior Championships in Athletics in (Nicaragua) Managua
- June 28 – July 1: OECS Track and Field Championships in (Saint Kitts and Nevis) Basseterre
- July 3 & 4: NACAC Combined Events Championships in (Canada) Ottawa
- August 10 – 12: 2018 NACAC Championships in (Canada) Toronto

=== CONSUDATLE ===
- March 16 & 17: South American Race Walking Championships in (Ecuador) Sucúa
- March 18: Ibero-American Marathon in Venezuela

=== OAA ===
- January 20 – 27: Oceania Masters Athletics Championships in (New Zealand) Dunedin
  - For all results, click here.
- February 11: Oceania Race Walking Championships in (Australia) Adelaide
  - 20 km Walk winners: (Sweden) Perseus Karlström (m) / (Australia) Beki Smith (f)
  - U20 10 km winners: (Australia) Declan Tingay (m) / (Australia) Katie Hayward (f)
  - U18 5 km winners: (Australia) Joe Cross (m) / (Australia) Olivia Sandery (f)
- February 18: Oceania 10km Road Championships in (Australia) Hobart
  - Winners: (Australia) Liam Adams (m) / (Australia) Lisa Jane Weightman (f)
- May 17 – 19: Melanesian Athletics Championships in (Vanuatu) Port Vila
  - 100 m: (Fiji) Heleina Young (f)
  - 200 m: (Australia) Nicole Kay (f)
  - 400 m: (Vanuatu) Valentine Hello (f)
  - 800 m: (Australia) Isabella Thornton-Bott (f)
  - 1500 m: (Australia) Caitlin Murdock (f)
  - 3000 m: (Solomon Islands) Sharon Firisua (F)
  - 5000 m: Audrey Hall (f)
  - 100 m Hurdles: (Australia) Rhonda Byrnes (f)
  - 400 m Hurdles: (Australia) Madeline Putz (f)
  - 4 × 100 m Relay: Australia A (Stephanie Welsh, Emma Klasen, Monique Quirk, Sophie White)
  - High Jump: (Australia) Laura Perich (f)
  - Pole Vault: (Australia) Isabelle Napier (f)
  - Long Jump: (Australia) Allison Nankivell (f)
  - Triple Jump: (Australia) Allison Nankivell (f)
  - Shot Put: (New Caledonia) Ashley Bologna (f)
  - Discus Throw: (Australia) Larissa O'Dea (f)
- June 9 & 10: Oceania Combined Events Championships in Australia
- June 14 – 16: Micronesian Athletics Championships in (Northern Mariana Islands) Saipan
- June 30 & July 1: Oceania Marathon and Half Marathon Championships Australia
- August 25: Oceania Cross Country Championships in TBD place
- September 6 – 8: Polynesian Regional Athletics Championships in (Samoa) Apia

=== AAA ===
- February 1 – 3: 2018 Asian Indoor Athletics Championships in (Iran) Tehran
  - 60 m winners: (Iran) Hassan Taftian (m) / (China) Liang Xiaojing (f)
  - 400 m winners: (Qatar) Abdalelah Haroun (m) / (Kazakhstan) Svetlana Golendova (f)
  - 800 m winners: (Qatar) Abubaker Haydar Abdalla (m) / (China) Wang Chunyu (f)
  - 1500 m winners: (Iran) Amir Moradi (m) / (Sri Lanka) Gayanthika Artigala (f)
  - 3000 m winners: (Iran) Hossein Keyhani (m) / (Kazakhstan) Tatyana Neroznak (f)
  - 60 m Hurdles winners: (Kuwait) Abdulaziz Al-Mandeel (m) / (Kazakhstan) Aigerim Shynazbekova (f)
  - 4 × 400 m winners: Qatar (m) / Kazakhstan (f)
  - High jump winners: (Qatar) Mutaz Essa Barshim (m) / (Uzbekistan) Nadiya Dusanova (f)
  - Pole Vault winners: (Kazakhstan) Nikita Filippov (m) / (Kazakhstan) Anastasiya Yermakova (f)
  - Long jump winners: (China) Shi Yuhao (m) / (Vietnam) Bùi Thị Thu Thảo (f)
  - Triple jump winners: (Kuwait) Khaled Al-Subaie (m) / (Kazakhstan) Irina Ektova (f)
  - Shot put winners: (Iran) Ali Samari (m) / (Uzbekistan) Elena Smolyanova (f)
  - Men's Heptathlon winner: (Kuwait) Majed Radhi Al-Sayed
  - Women's Pentathlon winner: (Iran) Sepideh Tavakoli

== Deaths ==
Athlete	Nation	Occupation	Age	Date	Ref
Horace Ashenfelter	United States	Steeplechaser	94	6 January	
Cliff Bourland	United States	Sprinter	97	1 February	
Roger Bannister	United Kingdom	Middle-distance athlete	88	4 March	
László Tábori	Hungary	Middle-distance athlete	86	23 May	
Dick Quax	New Zealand	Long-distance athlete	70	28 May	
Irena Szewińska	Poland	Sprinter	72	29 June	
Lindy Remigino	United States	Sprinter	87	11 July	
