= Athletics at the 1987 Summer Universiade – Men's javelin throw =

Javelin Throw event in 1987

The men's javelin throw event at the 1987 Summer Universiade was held at the Stadion Maksimir in Zagreb on 15 and 16 July 1987. It was the first time that the new model javelin was used at the Games.

== Medalists ==
Gold	Silver	Bronze
Marek Kaleta; Soviet Union	Sejad Krdžalić; Yugoslavia	Volker Hadwich; East Germany

== Results ==
=== Qualification ===
Qualification distance: 70.00 metres

Rank	Group	Athlete	Nationality	Result	Notes
1	?	Marek Kaleta	Soviet Union	77.54	Q
2	?	Volker Hadwich	East Germany	76.84	Q
3	?	Peter Blank	West Germany	76.50	Q
4	?	Sejad Krdžalić	Yugoslavia	73.76	Q
5	?	Jyrki Blom	Finland	73.60	Q
6	?	Ivan Mustapić	Yugoslavia	73.42	Q
7	?	Pascal Lefèvre	France	72.86	Q
8	?	Brian Crouser	United States	72.82	Q
9	?	Stéphane Laporte	France	72.66	Q
10	?	Mark Babich	United States	72.38	Q
11	?	Fabio De Gaspari	Italy	72.12	Q
12	?	Nicu Roata	Romania	72.04	Q
13	?	Einar Vilhjálmsson	Iceland	71.92	Q
14	?	Wolfram Gambke	West Germany	71.48	Q
15	?	Tapio Korjus	Finland	70.60	Q
16	?	Zhao Ming	China	70.44	Q
17	?	István Csider	Hungary	69.66	
18	?	Mike Mahovlich	Canada	69.28	
19	?	Kim Jae-sang	South Korea	67.60	
20	?	Metin Altintaş	Turkey	67.54	
21	?	Mike Brennan	Canada	62.78	
22	?	Marco Talavera	Paraguay	60.74	
23	?	Carlos Cunha	Portugal	60.58	
24	?	Jorge Parraguirre	Chile	57.04	
25	?	Mohamed Yazid Imran	Malaysia	52.44	
26	?	Darshana Wijegunasinghe	Sri Lanka	48.34	
27	?	Jorge Coronel	Ecuador	47.16	

=== Final ===
Rank	Athlete	Nationality	Result	Notes
1st place, gold medalist(s)	Marek Kaleta	Soviet Union	81.42	
2nd place, silver medalist(s)	Sejad Krdžalić	Yugoslavia	80.26	
3rd place, bronze medalist(s)	Volker Hadwich	East Germany	78.82	
4	Nicu Roata	Romania	77.82	
5	Peter Blank	West Germany	74.72	
6	Fabio De Gaspari	Italy	74.46	
7	Jyrki Blom	Finland	74.16	
8	Brian Crouser	United States	74.06	
9	Wolfram Gambke	West Germany	74.04	
10	Tapio Korjus	Finland	73.82	
11	Einar Vilhjálmsson	Iceland	73.64	
12	Mark Babich	United States	73.52	
13	Pascal Lefèvre	France	73.38	
14	Ivan Mustapić	Yugoslavia	72.22	
15	Stéphane Laporte	France	70.20	
16	Zhao Ming	China	67.50	
