= 1986 European Athletics Championships – Men's javelin throw =

Men's javelin throw at the European Athletics Championships

These are the official results of the Men's javelin throw event at the 1986 European Championships in Stuttgart, West Germany, held at Neckarstadion on 26 and 27 August 1986. There were a total number of 30 competitors. The qualification mark was set at 79.50 metres.

== Medalists ==
Gold	Klaus Tafelmeier; West Germany (FRG)
Silver	Detlef Michel; East Germany (GDR)
Bronze	Viktor Yevsyukov; Soviet Union (URS)

== Schedule ==
- All times are Central European Time (UTC+1)

Qualification Round
Group A	Group B
26.08.1986 – 18:25h	26.08.1986 – 19:40h
Final Round
27.08.1986 – 19:15h

== Abbreviations ==
- All results shown are in metres

Q	automatic qualification
q	qualification by rank
DNS	did not start
NM	no mark
WR	world record
AR	area record
NR	national record
PB	personal best
SB	season best

== Records ==
Standing records prior to the 1986 European Athletics Championships
World Record	Tom Petranoff (USA)	85.38 m	July 7, 1986	Helsinki, Finland
Event Record	Jānis Lūsis (URS)	91.52 m	September 19, 1969	Athens, Greece

== Qualification ==
- Held on 26 August 1986

Rank	Group A	Distance
1.	Klaus Tafelmeier (FRG)	82.68 m
2.	Gerald Weiss (GDR)	81.40 m
3.	Marek Kaleta (URS)	81.32 m
4.	Viktor Yevsyukov (URS)	80.48 m
5.	Jyrki Blom (FIN)	79.02 m
6.	Dag Wennlund (SWE)	76.88 m
7.	Roald Bradstock (GBR)	76.52 m
8.	Seppo Räty (FIN)	76.00 m
9.	Jean-Paul Lakafia (FRA)	75.24 m
10.	Reidar Lorentzen (NOR)	73.24 m
11.	Kenneth Petersen (DEN)	73.24 m
12.	László Stefan (HUN)	72.68 m
13.	Jan Olav Johansson (SWE)	72.30 m
14.	Sigurður Einarsson (ISL)	71.54 m
15.	Øystein Slettevold (NOR)	69.32 m

Rank	Group B	Distance
1.	Heino Puuste (URS)	82.54 m
2.	Detlef Michel (GDR)	79.84 m
3.	Sejad Krdžalić (YUG)	79.46 m
4.	Wolfram Gambke (FRG)	78.94 m
5.	Stanisław Górak (POL)	78.32 m
6.	Mick Hill (GBR)	77.94 m
7.	David Ottley (GBR)	77.88 m
8.	Einar Vilhjálmsson (ISL)	77.76 m
9.	Jorma Markus (FIN)	77.32 m
10.	Jan Železný (TCH)	75.90 m
11.	Charlus Bertimon (FRA)	75.82 m
12.	Peter Schreiber (FRG)	75.48 m
13.	Narve Hoff (NOR)	75.14 m
14.	Peter Borglund (SWE)	72.86 m
15.	Pascal Lefévre (FRA)	69.42 m

== Final ==
Rank	Final	Distance
	Klaus Tafelmeier (FRG)	84.76 m CR
	Detlef Michel (GDR)	81.90 m
	Viktor Yevsyukov (URS)	81.80 m
4.	Jyrki Blom (FIN)	80.48 m
5.	Heino Puuste (URS)	80.34 m
6.	Wolfram Gambke (FRG)	79.88 m
7.	Sejad Krdžalić (YUG)	79.50 m
8.	Mick Hill (GBR)	77.34 m
9.	Marek Kaleta (URS)	77.16 m
9.	David Ottley (GBR)	77.16 m
11.	Gerald Weiß (GDR)	76.24 m
12.	Stanisław Górak (POL)	74.20 m

== Participation ==
According to an unofficial count, 30 athletes from 14 countries participated in the event.

- Czechoslovakia (1)
- Denmark (1)
- East Germany (2)
- Finland (3)
- France (3)
- Hungary (1)
- Iceland (2)
- Norway (3)
- Poland (1)
- Soviet Union (3)
- Sweden (3)
- United Kingdom (3)
- West Germany (3)
- Yugoslavia (1)

== See also ==
- 1983 Men's World Championships Javelin Throw (Helsinki)
- 1984 Men's Olympic Javelin Throw (Los Angeles)
- 1987 Men's World Championships Javelin Throw (Rome)
- 1988 Men's Olympic Javelin Throw (Seoul)
