= Modicea =

- Location within Romania

Location
- Country: Romania
- Counties: Harghita County
- Villages: Băile Madicea

Physical characteristics
- Source: Gurghiu Mountains
- Mouth: Olt
  - location: Dănești
  - coordinates: 46.5027°N 25.7504°E
- Length: 12 km (7.5 mi)
- Basin size: 62 km^{2} (24 sq mi)

Basin features
- Progression: Olt→ Danube→ Black Sea
- Tributaries
  - left: Loc, Groapa Apei

The Modicea is a right tributary of the river Olt in Romania. It flows into the Olt in Dănești. Its length is 12 km (7.5 mi) and its basin size is 62 km^{2} (24 sq mi).
