= Yavuz Ağralı =

Turkish athlete

Personal information
- Nationality: Turkish
- Born: 9 April 1992 (age 34) Bingöl, Turkey

Sport
- Sport: Long-distance running
- Event: Marathon
- Club: Zeytinburnu Beştelsiz S.C.
Medal record
Men's athletics
Representing Turkey
Balkan Marathon Championships
Gold medal – first place	2017 Zagreb	Marathon
Balkan Half Marathon Championships
Silver medal – second place	2020 Zagreb	Half marathon
Silver medal – second place	2014 Zagreb	Half marathon

Yavuz Ağralı (born 9 April 1992) is a Turkish long-distance running athlete who competed in the marathon for Turkey at the 2020 Summer Olympics.

Yavuz Ağralı was born in Bingöl, eastern Turkey on 9 April 1992. Competing in marathon, he is a member of the Zeytinburnu Beştelsiz S.C. in Istanbul.

Ağralı became runner-up at the 2014 Zagreb Half Marathon, held within the Balkan Half Marathon Championships. He won the Zagreb Marathon with 2:18:22 held within the 2017 Balkan Marathon Championships. In 2020, he took the silver medal a second time at the Zagreb Half Marathon.

On 23 February 2021, he participated at the Seville Marathon, where he passed the Olympic minimum limit. He then completed a 130-day training camp in Ethiopia, and went to his hometown Bingöl after his return to Turkey. The Turkish Athletic Federation selected him for participation at the 2020 Summer Olympics.
