= Association of the Balkan Athletics Federations =

The Association of the Balkan Athletics Federations, commonly known as Balkan Athletics is the organisation which organises the annual senior Balkan Athletics Championships and Balkan Athletics Indoor Championships, as well as other competitions at junior and youth level on track and field and other surfaces.

== Membership ==
Balkan Athletics is made up of 22 member federations.

- (Albania) Albanian Athletics Federation
- Azerbaijan Athletics Federation
- (Armenia) Armenian Athletic Federation
- Athletic Federation of Bosnia and Herzegovina
- (Bulgaria) Bulgarian Athletic Federation
- (Croatia) Croatian Athletics Federation
- Amateur Athletic Association of Cyprus
- (Georgia (country)) Athletic Federation of Georgia
- (Greece) Hellenic Amateur Athletic Association
- (Israel) Israeli Athletic Association
- Kosovo Athletic Federation
- Athletics Federation of Moldova
- Athletic Federation of Montenegro
- Athletic Federation of North Macedonia
- (Romania) Romanian Athletics Federation
- Athletics Federation of Serbia
- Athletic Federation of Slovenia
- (Turkey) Turkish Athletic Federation
- (Ukraine) Ukrainian Athletic Federation

== Nations ==
- Greece (from 1929)
- Romania (from 1929)
- Bulgaria (from 1929)
- Turkey (from 1931)
- Albania (from 1946)
- Slovenia (from 1992)
- Croatia (from 1992)
- North Macedonia (from 1992)
- Bosnia and Herzegovina (from 1992)
- Moldova (from 1992)
- Montenegro (from 2006)
- Serbia (from 2006)
- Armenia (from 2013)
- Cyprus (from 2014)
- Georgia (from 2014)
- Israel (from 2015)
- Kosovo (from 2016)
- San Marino (from 2016)
- Ukraine (from 2016)
- Azerbaijan (from 2017)
- Austria (from 2018)

=== Former nations ===
- Kingdom of Yugoslavia (1929-1940)
- Socialist Federal Republic of Yugoslavia (1953-1990)
- Serbia and Montenegro (1992-2005)

== Competitions ==
Balkan Athletics runs a number of competitions.

Competition	Type	First held
Balkan Athletics Championships	outdoor track and field	1930
Balkan Athletics Indoor Championships	indoor track and field	1994
Balkan Cross Country Championships	cross country running	1940
Balkan Mountain Running Championships	mountain running	2008
Balkan Half Marathon Championships	half marathon	2012
Balkan Marathon Championships	marathon	1930
Balkan Race Walking Championships	racewalking	2002
Balkan Relay Championships	Relay	2018
Balkan Athletics U20 Championships	outdoor under-20 athletics	1970
Balkan U20 Indoor Athletics Championships	indoor under-20 athletics	2017
Balkan U18 Athletics Championships	outdoor under-18 athletics	2003

== See also ==
- Mediterranean Athletics U23 Championships
