= Dănești, Harghita =

Dănești Csíkdánfalva
- Commune
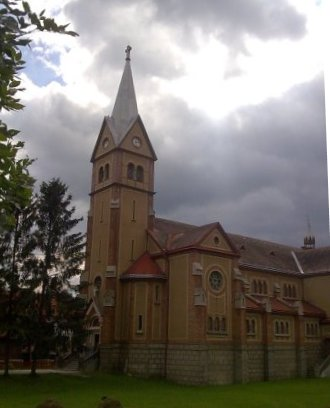
- Roman Catholic church in Dănești

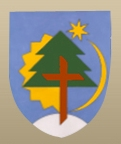
- Coat of arms

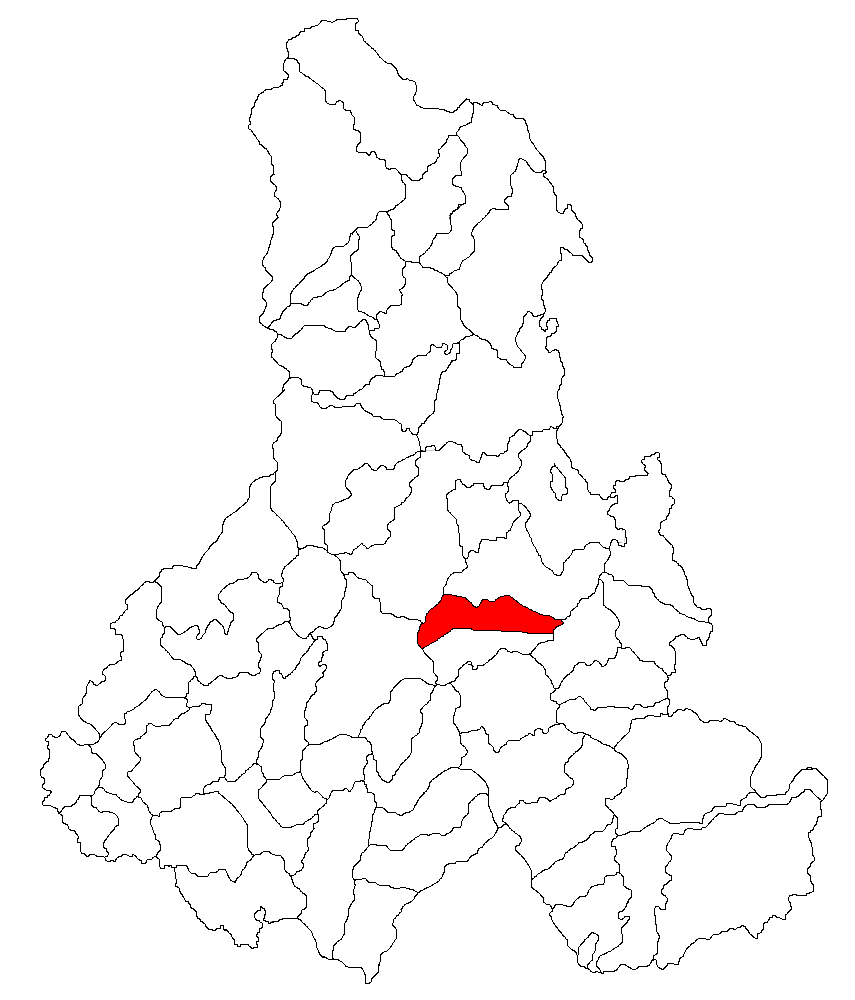
- Location in Harghita County

- Location in Romania
- Coordinates: 46°31′0″N 25°45′0″E
- Country: Romania
- County: Harghita

Government
  - Mayor (2020–2024): Csongor-Ernő Bőjte (UDMR)
- Area: 61.73 km^{2} (23.83 sq mi)
- Elevation: 704 m (2,310 ft)
- Population (2021-12-01): 2,079
  - Density: 33.68/km^{2} (87.23/sq mi)
- Time zone: UTC+02:00 (EET)
  - Summer (DST): UTC+03:00 (EEST)
- Postal code: 537070
- Area code: +40 234
- Vehicle reg.: HR
- Website: www.danfalva.ro

Dănești (Hungarian: Csíkdánfalva or colloquially Dánfalva, Hungarian pronunciation: [ˈtʃiːkdaːnfɒlvɒ]) is a commune in Harghita County, Romania. It lies in the Székely Land, an ethno-cultural region in eastern Transylvania. The commune is composed of a single village, Dănești. It also included Mădăraș until 2002, when it was split off to form a separate commune.

== History ==
It was first recorded in 1567 as Danffalwa and in 1576 as Dánfalva. Its name derives from the Hungarian and means 'Daniel's village' using the archaic Hungarian form of the name. Until 1919, its Romanian name used to be Danfalău, which was then Romanianized to the current official name.

Until 1779, villagers were engaged in the operation of iron hammers, but in the 19th century it became a potters' village. Today, it has a black pottery factory. From 1762 to 1851, the village provided servicemen for the 7th Company of 1st Székely Infantry Regiment, guarding the Transylvanian Military Frontier. Wood processing, animal-breeding and transportation were the main preoccupation of the villagers.

The village administratively belonged to Csíkszék district in the Kingdom of Hungary until the administrative reform of Transylvania in 1876, when it fell within Csík County. In the aftermath of World War I and the Hungarian–Romanian War of 1918–1919, the village passed under Romanian administration; after the Treaty of Trianon of 1920, like the rest of Transylvania, it became part of the Kingdom of Romania. During the interwar period it fell within Plasa Centrală of Ciuc County. In 1940, the Second Vienna Award granted Northern Transylvania to Hungary and the village was held by Hungary until 1944. After Soviet occupation, the Romanian administration returned and the village became officially part of Romania in March 1945. Between 1952 and 1960, Dănești belonged to the Ciuc raion of Magyar Autonomous Region, and between 1960 and 1968 to the Mureș-Magyar Autonomous Region. In 1968, the region was abolished, and since then, the commune has been part of Harghita County.

== Geography ==
The commune lies at the foot of the Harghita Mountains, on the banks of the Olt River, where the Köd Brook flows into the Olt. It is located in the central part of Harghita County, 21 km (13 mi) north of the county seat, Miercurea Ciuc, and is traversed by national road DN12 (part of European route E578). The Dănești train station serves the CFR Line 400, which runs from Brașov to Satu Mare.

Some of the natural resources found here are iron ore, mercury, kaolin, cinnabar, and mineral water.

== Demographics ==
At the 2011 census, the commune had a population of 2,292; out of them, 99% were Hungarians, 0.6% were Romanians, and 0.3% were Roma. At the 2021 census, Dănești had 2,079 inhabitants; of those, 96.63% were Hungarians.

== Landmarks ==
- The Townhall was built in 1912 by Antal Vidor, in the style specific to Károly Kós.
- The Roman Catholic church was built between 1922 and 1935, and was consecrated in honour of the Immaculate Conception. It is surrounded by a fortified wall, strengthened by a tower. Not far from the church stands the memorial column of Queen Elisabeth of Hungary.
- The Sándor Petőfi School Center.
- Some 1.5 km (0.93 mi) west of the village, one can visit a thermal spa (established in 1926), with water at a temperature of 21 °C (70 °F).

== Notable people ==
The following notable people were born here:

- Áron Antal (1881–1966): writer
- Antal Albert (1929–2005): editor-in-chief of local Hungarian newspaper Hargita Népe
- Ernő Albert (1932–2022): ethnographer
- Ludovic Gall (1900–1944): long-distance runner
- Pál János (1921–2018): curator, ethnographer
- Márton Zsigmond (1947–): painter, mosaicist

== Twinning ==
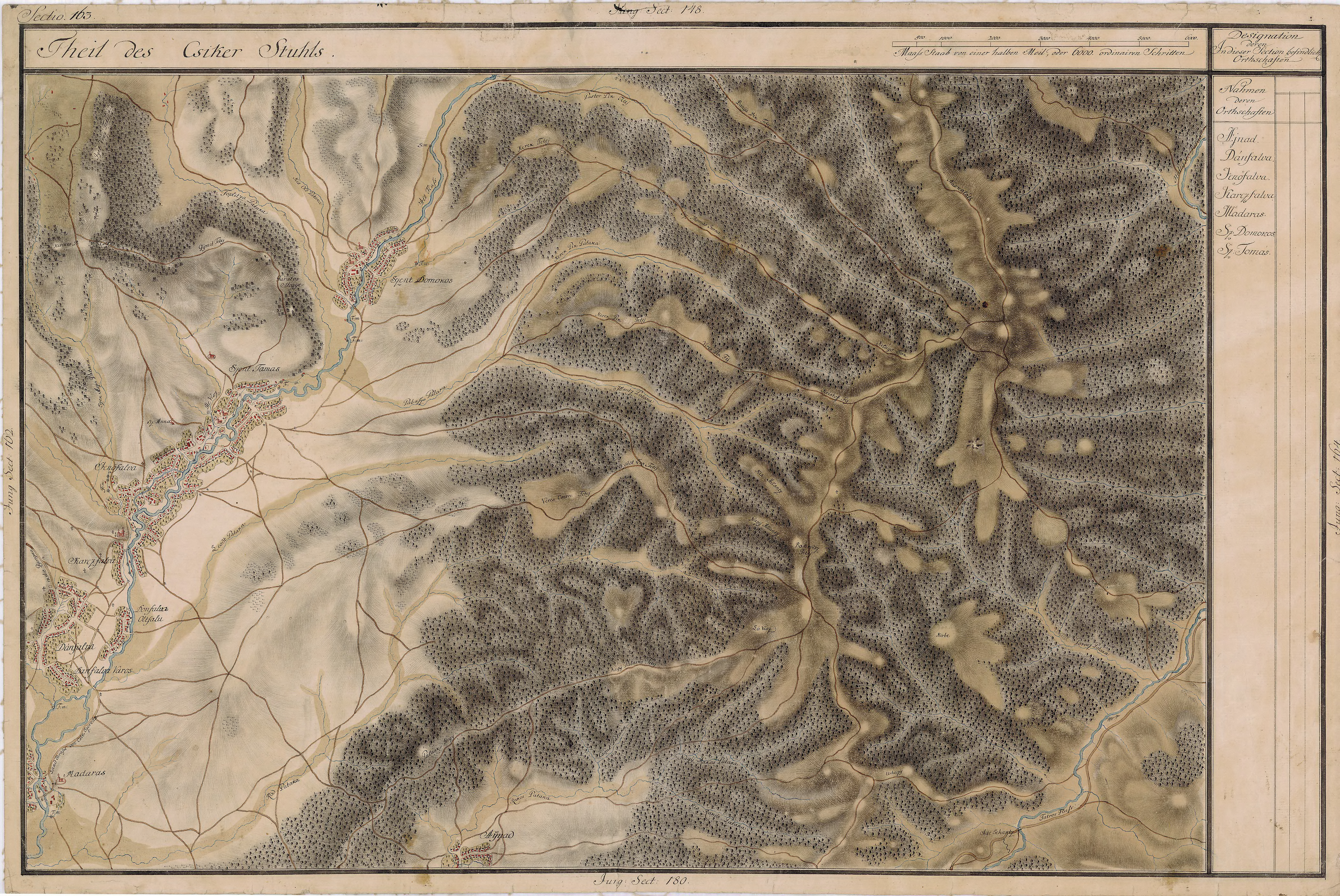
As Dánfalva on Josephinische Landaufnahme

The commune is twinned with

- Solt, Hungary
