= Ivan Mustapić =

Croatian javelin thrower

Personal information
- Born: 9 July 1966 (age 60) Posušje, SR Bosnia and Herzegovina, SFR Yugoslavia

Sport
- Sport: Track and field
Medal record
Representing Yugoslavia
Mediterranean Games
Gold medal – first place	1993 Languedoc-Roussillon	Javelin throw
Silver medal – second place	1987 Latakia	Javelin throw

Ivan Mustapić (born 9 July 1966) is a former Croatian javelin thrower. He competed for Croatia at the 1992 Summer Olympics. He was also the Croatian national javelin throw champion four times. His personal best throw was 82.70 metres, achieved in 1992. He competed at the World Championships in Athletics on three occasions, having his best finish (20th) in 1993.

== International competitions ==
Year	Competition	Venue	Position	Notes
Representing Yugoslavia
1987	Universiade	Zagreb, Yugoslavia	14th	72.21 m
1987	World Championships	Rome, Italy	26th (q)	72.34 m
1987	Mediterranean Games	Latakia, Syria	2nd	70.48 m
1990	European Championships	Split, SFR Yugoslavia	21st (q)	75.04 m
Representing Croatia
1992	Olympic Games	Barcelona, Spain	17th (q)	77.50 m
1993	Mediterranean Games	Languedoc-Roussillon, France	1st	79.46 m
1993	World Championships	Stuttgart, Germany	20th (q)	75.64 m
1994	European Championships	Helsinki, Finland	24th (q)	72.50 m
1995	World Championships	Gothenburg, Sweden	27th (q)	73.12 m

== Seasonal bests by year ==
- 1987 – 73.34
- 1990 – 75.04
- 1992 – 82.70 NR
- 1993 – 79.90
- 1994 – 81.22
- 1995 – 79.78
