= Ludovic Gall =

Romanian long-distance runner

Personal information
- Nationality: Romanian
- Born: Lajos Gáll; 10 June 1900 Dănești, Harghita, Austria-Hungary
- Died: 14 September 1944 (aged 44) Corund, Northern Transylvania
- Height: 161 cm (63 in)
- Weight: 53 kg (117 lb)

Sport
- Sport: Long-distance running
- Event: Marathon
- Club: Astra Brașov; IAR Brașov; ASM Brașov

Ludovic Gall (born Lajos Gáll, 10 June 1900 – 14 September 1944) was a Romanian long-distance runner. He competed in the marathon at the 1936 Summer Olympics where he finished on the 23rd place. He was the first Romanian athlete to complete a marathon run at the Olympic Games.

Gall won three marathon gold medals (1932, 1933, 1935), a silver medal (1936) and two bronze medals (1937, 1939) at the Balkan Championships marathon. He also won six Romanian national marathon competitions (1933, 1934, 1935, 1936, 1938, 1939), establishing new national records at the 1935 and 1936 editions. He represented the sports clubs Astra Brașov (1933), IAR Brașov (1934–1939), and ASM Brașov (1940). In July 1934, after winning the national marathon competition at the Brașov stadium, he was congratulated in person by King Carol I of Romania.

A street in Sfântu Gheorghe is named after him and a runners circle in the city also bears Gall's name.
