= İsmail Akçay =

Turkish marathon runner

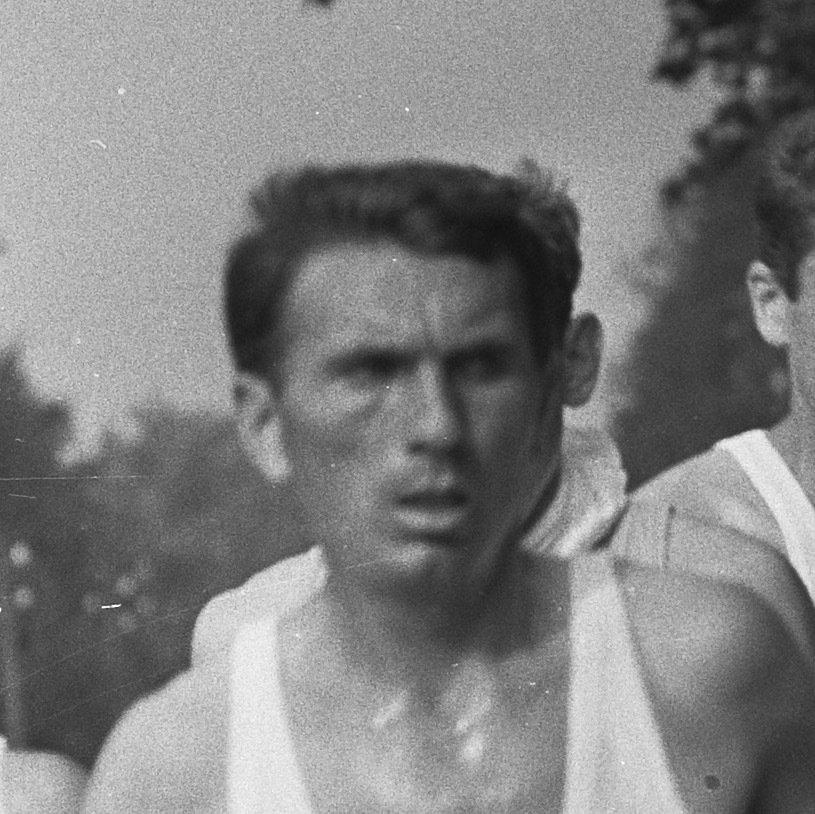
İsmail Akçay in 1967

İsmail Akçay (born in 1942) is a Turkish athlete. He was born in Akçakaya village of Balıkesir Province. After finishing primary school in his village, he studied in the industrial vocational high school of Balıkesir. Then he transferred to sergents' school in Ankara where he was interested in athletics. He specialized in marathon events.

== Career ==
His international degrees are as follows:

Year	Event	City	Rank
1966	Balkan Games	Sarajevo	Gold
1967	Las Vegas Marathon	Las Vegas	Silver
1967	Mediterranean Games	Tunis	Silver
1968	Balkan Games	İstanbul	Gold
1968	1968 Summer Olympics	Mexico City	4
1968	Fukuoka Marathon	Fukuoka	4
1969	Balkan Games	Sofia	Bronze
1971	Balkan Games	Zagreb	Gold
1971	Mediterranean Games	İzmir	Bronze
1972	Balkan Games	İzmir	Silver
1973	Balkan Games	Athens	Gold

His result in 1968 Summer Olympics in Mexico city was the best result Turkey had had in the Olympic marathon events up to that time.

== Presently ==
Presently İsmail Akçay serves as an athletic trainer in Balıkesir.
