= Sejad Krdžalić =

Athletics competitor

Personal information
- Full name: Sejad Krdžalić
- Nationality: Yugoslavia
- Born: January 5, 1960 (age 66) Doboj, PR Bosnia and Herzegovina, FPR Yugoslavia
- Height: 1.87 m (6 ft 2 in)
- Weight: 93 kg (205 lb)

Sport
- Country: SFR Yugoslavia
- Sport: Javelin throw

Achievements and titles
- Olympic finals: 1984, 17th 1988, 12th
- Regional finals: 1986 Euro Champions, 7th
- National finals: 1987 World Champions, 9th 1991 World Champions, 13th
Medal record
Representing Yugoslavia
Summer Universiade
| Silver medal – second place | 1987 Zagreb | Javelin throw |
Mediterranean Games
| Gold medal – first place | 1987 Latakia | Javelin throw |

Sejad Krdžalić (born January 5, 1960, in Doboj) is a retired javelin thrower from Yugoslavia, who finished in twelfth place at the 1988 Summer Olympics in Seoul, South Korea. He set his personal best (83.34 m) on 30 May 1987 in Belgrade.

== International competitions ==
| Year | Competition | Venue | Position | Notes |
|---|---|---|---|---|
| 1984 | Olympic Games | Los Angeles, United States | 16th | 76.52 m |
| 1986 | European Championships | Stuttgart, West Germany | 7th | |
| 1987 | Universiade | Zagreb, Yugoslavia | 2nd | 80.26 m |
| 1987 | World Championships | Rome, Italy | 17th | 75.94 m |
| 1987 | Mediterranean Games | Latakia, Syria | 1st | |
| 1988 | Olympic Games | Seoul, South Korea | 12th | |
| 1990 | European Championships | Split, Yugoslavia | 18th | 77.28 m |
| 1991 | World Championships | Tokyo, Japan | 28th | 73.84 m |
