= Franjo Škrinjar =

Yugoslav long-distance runner (1920–1989)

Personal information
- Nationality: Yugoslavia
- Born: 17 May 1920 Dragoslavec Breg, Gornji Mihaljevec municipality, Međimurska županija, Kingdom of Serbs, Croats and Slovenes (now Croatia)
- Died: 19 February 1989 (aged 68) Zagreb, SR Croatia, SFR Yugoslavia

Sport
- Sport: Long-distance running
- Event: Marathon

Franjo Škrinjar (17 May 1920 – 19 February 1989) was a Croatian long-distance runner who competed for Yugoslavia. He competed in the marathon at the 1960 Summer Olympics, placing 10th.
