= Stéphane Laporte =

French javelin thrower

Personal information
- Born: 17 July 1966 (age 60) Lyon, France

Sport
- Sport: Track and field
- Club: ASPTT Grenoble

Stéphane Laporte (born 17 July 1966) is a retired track and field athlete from France, who competed in the men's javelin throw event during his career. He represented France at the 1988 Summer Olympics in Seoul, South Korea, where he didn't reach the final after throwing 69.40 metres in the qualification round.

== Achievements ==
Year	Competition	Venue	Position	Notes
Representing France
1988	Olympic Games	Seoul, South Korea	32nd	69.40 m
