= Hüseyin Aktaş =

Turkish long-distance runner

Personal information
- Nationality: Turkish
- Born: 25 March 1941 Erzincan, Turkey
- Died: 26 July 2012 (aged 71)

Sport
- Sport: Long-distance running
- Event: Marathon

Hüseyin Aktaş (25 March 1941 – 26 July 2012) was a Turkish long-distance runner. He competed in the marathon at the 1968 Summer Olympics and the 1976 Summer Olympics.
