= Kelkile Gezahegn =

Ethiopian long-distance runner

Kelkile Gezahegn Woldaregay
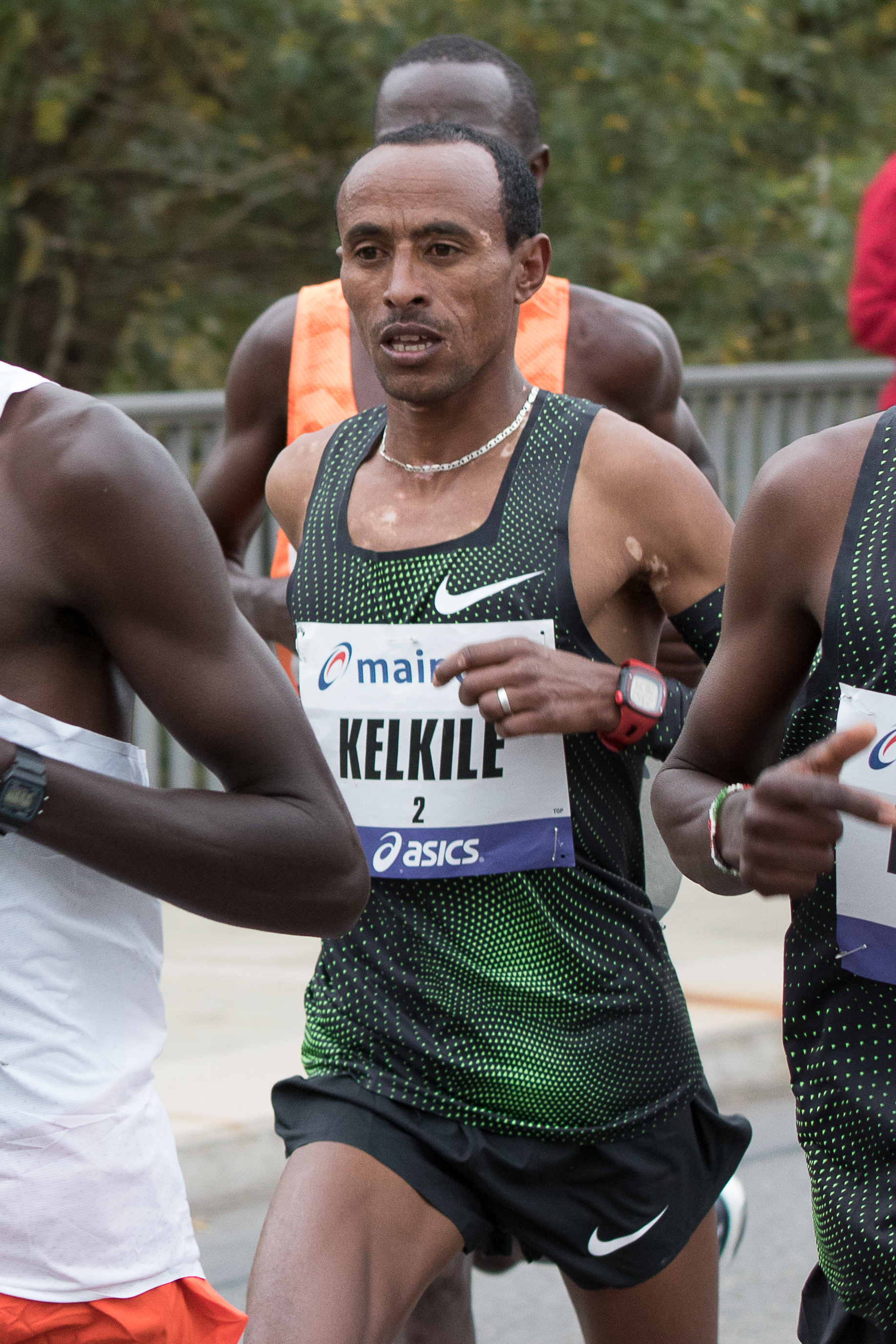
- Kelkile Gezahegn at the 2018 Frankfurt Marathon

Personal information
- Nationality: Ethiopian
- Born: 1 October 1996 (age 29)

Sport
- Country: Ethiopia
- Sport: Athletics
- Event: Marathon
Medal record
Representing Ethiopia

Kelkile Gezahegn Woldaregay (born 1 October 1996) is an Ethiopian long-distance runner who is specialized in marathon.

== Career ==
In 2016 Kelkile won three marathon competitions in China: in Chongqing (2:10:52), Hengshui (2:11:11) and Hefei (2:08:54).

In 2017 he improved his personal best twice, first at the Rotterdam Marathon in April where he finished sixth in 2:07:29 and in October when he finished second at the Frankfurt Marathon in 2:06:55.

In 2018 he improved his personal best to 2:05:56 at the Rotterdam Marathon, finishing third. He won the Lanzhou Marathon in June in 2:11:00 and the Frankfurt Marathon in October in 2:06:37.

He began the 2019 season with a sixth-place finish in the Dubai Marathon in January, clocking 2:06:09. He won the Ljubljana Marathon in October in 2:07:29.

In 2020 he won the Houston Marathon with a time of 2:08:36.

== Personal Best ==
- Marathon: 2:05:56, 8. April 2018, Rotterdam
