= Balkan Half Marathon Championships =

The Balkan Half Marathon Championships is an annual international competition over the half marathon between athletes from the Balkans. Organised by the Association of the Balkan Athletics Federations, it was inaugurated in 2012. It is one of two road running championships for the region, alongside the Balkan Marathon Championships.

The championships features races for both men and women. National team competitions are held within the individual races, with each nation's score being the total of the finishing positions of their best three athletes.

== Editions ==
| Edition | Year | Venue | Country | Date | Men's winner | Time (m:s) | Women's winner | Time (m:s) |
|---|---|---|---|---|---|---|---|---|
| 1st | 2012 | Kavarna | Bulgaria | 1 September | Gheorghita Vitalie (MDA) | 1:10.48 | Slađana Perunović (MNE) | 1:22.41 |
| 2nd | 2013 | Oradea | Romania | 15 September | Nicolae Soare (ROM) | 1:04:26 | Olivera Jevtić (SRB) | 1:14:39 |
| 3rd | 2014 | Durrës | Albania | 6 April | Muzaffer Bajram (TUR) | 1:04:53 | Slađana Perunović (MNE) | 1:15:27 |
| 4th | 2015 | Apatin | Serbia | 18 October | Demir Medeni (TUR) | 1:06:55 | Buyukbezgin Burcu (TUR) | 1:17:51 |
| 5th | 2016 | Podgorica | Montenegro | 30 October | Bekir Karayel (TUR) | 1:07:46 | Olivera Jevtić (SRB) | 1:12:25 |
| 6th | 2017 | Pristina | Kosovo | 14 May | Kaya Serkan (TUR) | 1:07:43 | Yildiz Şeyma (TUR) | 1:18:32 |
| 7th | 2018 | Sarajevo | Bosnia | 16 September | Aykut Tasdemir (TUR) | 1:08:01 | Olivera Jevtić (SRB) | 1:14:46 |
| 8th | 2019 | Kyiv | Ukraine | 7 April | Roman Romanenko (UKR) | 1:04:36 | Darya Mykhaylova (UKR) | 1:11:50 |
