= Jyrki Blom =

Finnish javelin thrower

Personal information
- Born: 11 May 1962 (age 64) Kotka, Finland

Sport
- Sport: Track and field

Jyrki Blom (born 11 May 1962) is a retired Finnish javelin thrower. He finished fourth at the 1986 European Championships. He competed at the 1987 World Championships, but placed lowly in the qualification round and did not reach the final.

== Achievements ==
Year	Competition	Venue	Position	Notes
Representing Finland
1987	World Championships	Rome, Italy	19th	75.74 m

== Seasonal bests by year ==
- 1986 - 80.48
- 1987 - 79.28
- 1988 - 73.64
- 1989 - 76.78
- 1990 - 76.30
- 1992 - 77.00
- 1993 - 76.44
