= 1969 Boston Marathon =

Footrace in Boston, Massachusetts, USA

- Venue: Boston, Massachusetts, U.S.
- Date: April 21, 1969
- Competitors: 1,152

Champions
- Men: Yoshiaki Unetani (2:13:49)
- Women: Sara Mae Berman (3:22:46)

The 1969 Boston Marathon took place on Monday, April 21, 1969. It was the 73rd time the Boston Marathon was organized. The race featured 1,342 official entrants, with 1,152 starting the race.

The race was won by Yoshiaki Unetani of Japan in 2:13:49, a new course record. This was the first edition of the Boston Marathon contested with the Patriots' Day holiday defined as the third Monday in April.

== Results ==
=== Men ===
| Position | Athlete | Nationality | Time |
|---|---|---|---|
| 1 | Yoshiaki Unetani | Japan | 2:13:49 |
| 2 | Pablo Garrido | Mexico | 2:17:30 |
| 3 | Alfredo Peñaloza | Mexico | 2:19:56 |
| 4 | Ron Daws | United States | 2:20:23 |
| 5 | Robert Moore | United Kingdom (Note: Boston Athletic Association records list Moore as being a Canadian resident; contemporary news reports noted that he was originally from England.) | 2:21:28 |
| 6 | Bob Deines | United States | 2:22:49 |
| 7 | José García | Mexico | 2:23:16 |
| 8 | Pat McMahon | Ireland | 2:23:24 |
| 9 | Phil Hampton | United Kingdom | 2:23:46 |
| 10 | Pentti Rummakko | Finland | 2:24:14 |

Other notable participants included Amby Burfoot (15th), John J. Kelley (22nd), and George A. Hirsch (340th),

=== Women ===
Women were not officially allowed to enter until 1972, but their first-place results from 1966 through 1971 were later ratified by the Boston Athletic Association. Sara Mae Berman, originally from The Bronx in New York City, finished first among women runners, credited with a time of 3:22:46. Berman is also recognized as the 1970 and 1971 women's champion.
