= Athletics at the 1968 Summer Olympics – Men's marathon =

Men's marathon at the Games of the XIX Olympiad
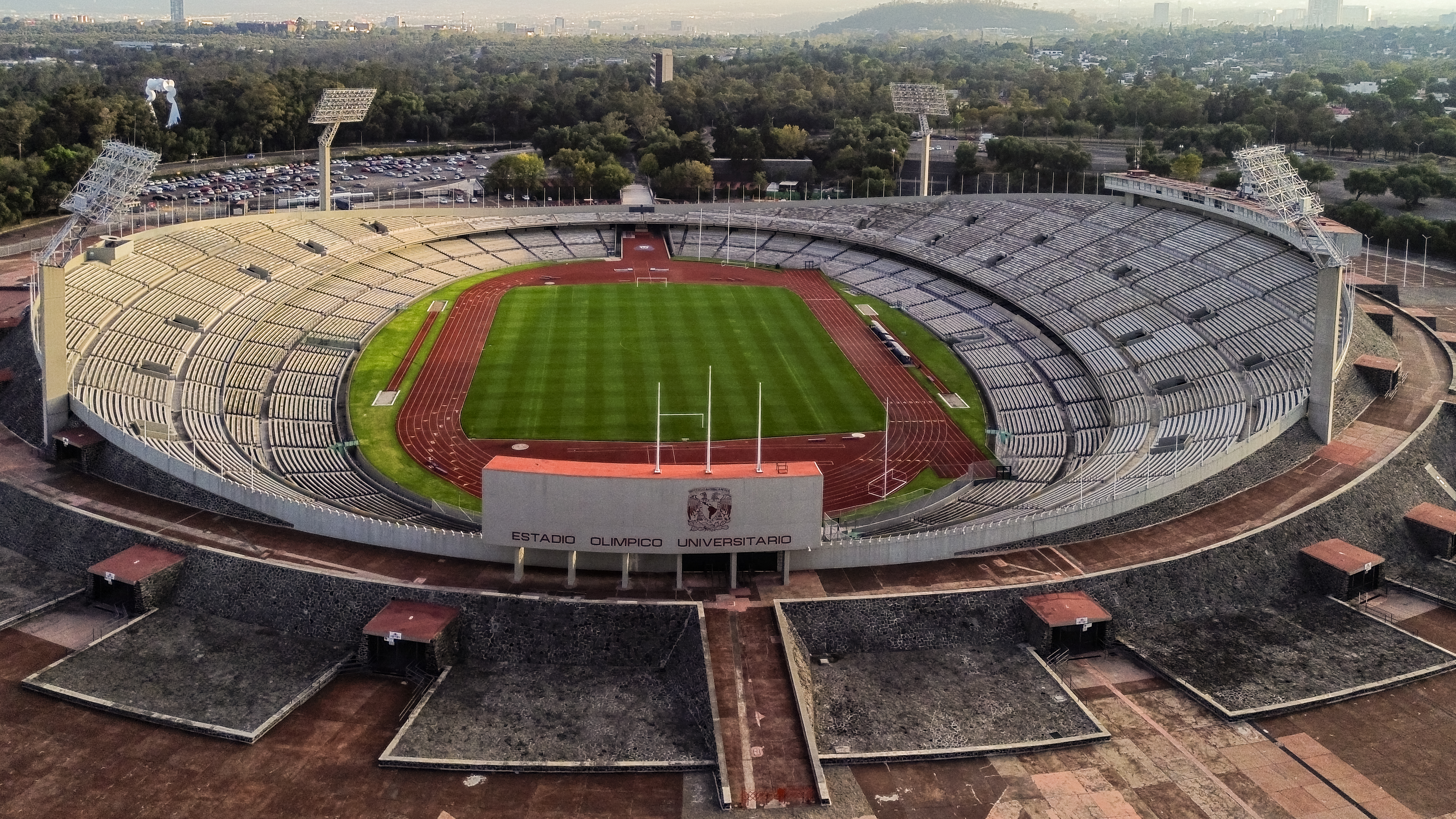
- Olympic Stadium (2016)
- Venue: Estadio Olímpico Universitario, Mexico City
- Date: October 20, 1968
- Competitors: 75 from 41 nations
- Winning time: 2:20:26

Medalists
1st place, gold medalist(s)		Mamo Wolde; Ethiopia
2nd place, silver medalist(s)		Kenji Kimihara; Japan
3rd place, bronze medalist(s)		Mike Ryan; New Zealand

Official Video Highlights

The men's marathon at the 1968 Summer Olympics in Mexico City, Mexico, was held on Sunday October 20, 1968. The race started at 15:00h local time. There were 75 competitors from 41 countries. Eighteen of them did not finish. The maximum number of athletes per nation had been set at 3 since the 1930 Olympic Congress. The event was won by Mamo Wolde of Ethiopia, the nation's third consecutive gold medal in the Olympic marathon (matching France for most golds overall in the event).

== Background ==
This was the 16th appearance of the event, which is one of 12 athletics events to have been held at every Summer Olympics. Returning runners from the 1964 marathon included two-time defending champion Abebe Bikila of Ethiopia, fifth-place finisher József Sütő of Hungary, and eighth-place finisher Kenji Kimihara of Japan. Abebe would have been favored but was recovering from an appendectomy and stress fracture. His countryman Mamo Wolde (who had run in 1964 but had not finished, while his brother Demissie Wolde finished 10th) was a "formidable contender," particularly with the high altitude of Mexico City seen as being favorable to the Ethiopian team, used to high altitudes.

Costa Rica, Guyana, Kuwait, Nigeria, the Philippines, Sierra Leone, Uganda, Uruguay, and Zambia each made their first appearance in Olympic marathons; East and West Germany competed separately for the first time. The United States made its 16th appearance, the only nation to have competed in each Olympic marathon to that point.

== Competition format and course ==
As all Olympic marathons, the competition was a single race. The marathon distance of 26 miles, 385 yards was run over a point-to-point course. The course ran from the Zócalo to the Olympic Stadium.

== Records ==
These were the standing world and Olympic records prior to the 1968 Summer Olympics.

World record	Derek Clayton (AUS)	2:09:36.4	Fukuoka, Japan	3 December 1967
Olympic record	Abebe Bikila (ETH)	2:12:11.2	Tokyo, Japan	21 October 1964

No new world or Olympic bests were set during the competition.

== Schedule ==
All times are Central Standard Time (UTC-6)

Date	Time	Round
Sunday, 20 October 1968	15:00	Final

== Results ==
Rank	Athlete	Nation	Time
1st place, gold medalist(s)	Mamo Wolde	Ethiopia	2:20:26
2nd place, silver medalist(s)	Kenji Kimihara	Japan	2:23:31
3rd place, bronze medalist(s)	Mike Ryan	New Zealand	2:23:45
4	İsmail Akçay	Turkey	2:25:18
5	Bill Adcocks	Great Britain	2:25:33
6	Gabrou Merawi	Ethiopia	2:27:16
7	Derek Clayton	Australia	2:27:23
8	Tim Johnston	Great Britain	2:28:04
9	Akio Usami	Japan	2:28:06
10	Andy Boychuk	Canada	2:28:40
11	Gaston Roelants	Belgium	2:29:04
12	Pat McMahon	Ireland	2:29:21
13	Alfredo Peñaloza	Mexico	2:29:48
14	Kenny Moore	United States	2:29:49
15	Jürgen Busch	East Germany	2:30:42
16	George Young	United States	2:31:15
17	Manfred Steffny	West Germany	2:31:23
18	Thin Sumbwegam	Burma	2:32:22
19	Naftali Temu	Kenya	2:32:36
20	Maurice Peiren	Belgium	2:32:49
21	Antonio Ambu	Italy	2:33:19
22	Ron Daws	United States	2:33:53
23	Karl-Heinz Sievers	West Germany	2:34:11
24	Gyula Tóth	Hungary	2:34:49
25	Hüseyin Aktaş	Turkey	2:35:09
26	Pablo Garrido	Mexico	2:35:47
27	Aad Steylen	Netherlands	2:37:42
28	Anatoly Sukharkov	Soviet Union	2:38:07
29	Lee Myeong-jeong	South Korea	2:38:52
30	Ivaylo Sharankov	Bulgaria	2:39:49
31	Gioacchino De Palma	Italy	2:39:58
32	Josef Gwerder	Switzerland	2:40:16
33	Hubert Riesner	West Germany	2:41:29
34	Georg Olsen	Denmark	2:42:24
35	Douglas Zinkala	Zambia	2:42:51
36.	Ezequiel Baeza	Chile	2:43:15
37	Dave McKenzie	New Zealand	2:43:36
38	Kim Bong-nae	South Korea	2:43:56
39	Carlos Cuque	Guatemala	2:45:20
40	Godwin Kalimbwe	Zambia	2:45:26
41	Mick Molloy	Ireland	2:48:13
42	Nikola Simeonov	Bulgaria	2:48:30
43	John Farrington	Australia	2:50:16
44	Helmut Kunisch	Switzerland	2:50:58
45	Alifu Massaquoi	Sierra Leone	2:52:28
46	Lee Sang-Hoon	South Korea	2:52:46
47	Hla Thein	Burma	2:54:03
48	Paul Mose	Kenya	2:55:17
49	Benjamin Silva-Netto	Philippines	2:56:19
50	Harry Prowell	Guyana	2:57:01
51	Wimalasena Perera	Ceylon	2:59:05
52	Fulgencio Hernández	Guatemala	3:00:40
53	Gustavo Gutiérrez	Ecuador	3:03:07
54	Martin Ande	Nigeria	3:03:47
55	Mustafa Musa	Uganda	3:04:53
56	Enoch Muemba	Zambia	3:06:16
57	John Stephen Akhwari	Tanzania	3:25:17
—	Carlos Pérez	Spain	DNF
—	Rafael Pérez	Costa Rica	DNF
—	Abebe Bikila	Ethiopia	DNF
—	Jerome Drayton	Canada	DNF
—	Pentti Rummakko	Finland	DNF
—	Guy Texereau	France	DNF
—	René Combes	France	DNF
—	Jim Alder	Great Britain	DNF
—	Lajos Mecser	Hungary	DNF
—	József Sütő	Hungary	DNF
—	Seiichiro Sasaki	Japan	DNF
—	Mraljeb Ayed Mansoor	Kuwait	DNF
—	Saoud Obaid Daifallah	Kuwait	DNF
—	José García	Mexico	DNF
—	Edgar Friedli	Switzerland	DNF
—	Mukhamed Shakirov	Soviet Union	DNF
—	Armando González	Uruguay	DNF
—	Nedo Farčić	Yugoslavia	DNF
—	Hernán Barreneche	Colombia	DNS
—	Ton Eykenboom	Netherlands	DNS
—	Mohammed Gammoudi	Tunisia	DNS
—	Jürgen Haase	East Germany	DNS
—	Jouko Kuha	Finland	DNS
—	Ettore Milone	Italy	DNS
—	Edward Stawiarz	Poland	DNS
—	Yury Volkov	Soviet Union	DNS
