= Athletics at the 1972 Summer Olympics – Men's marathon =

Men's marathon at the Games of the XX Olympiad
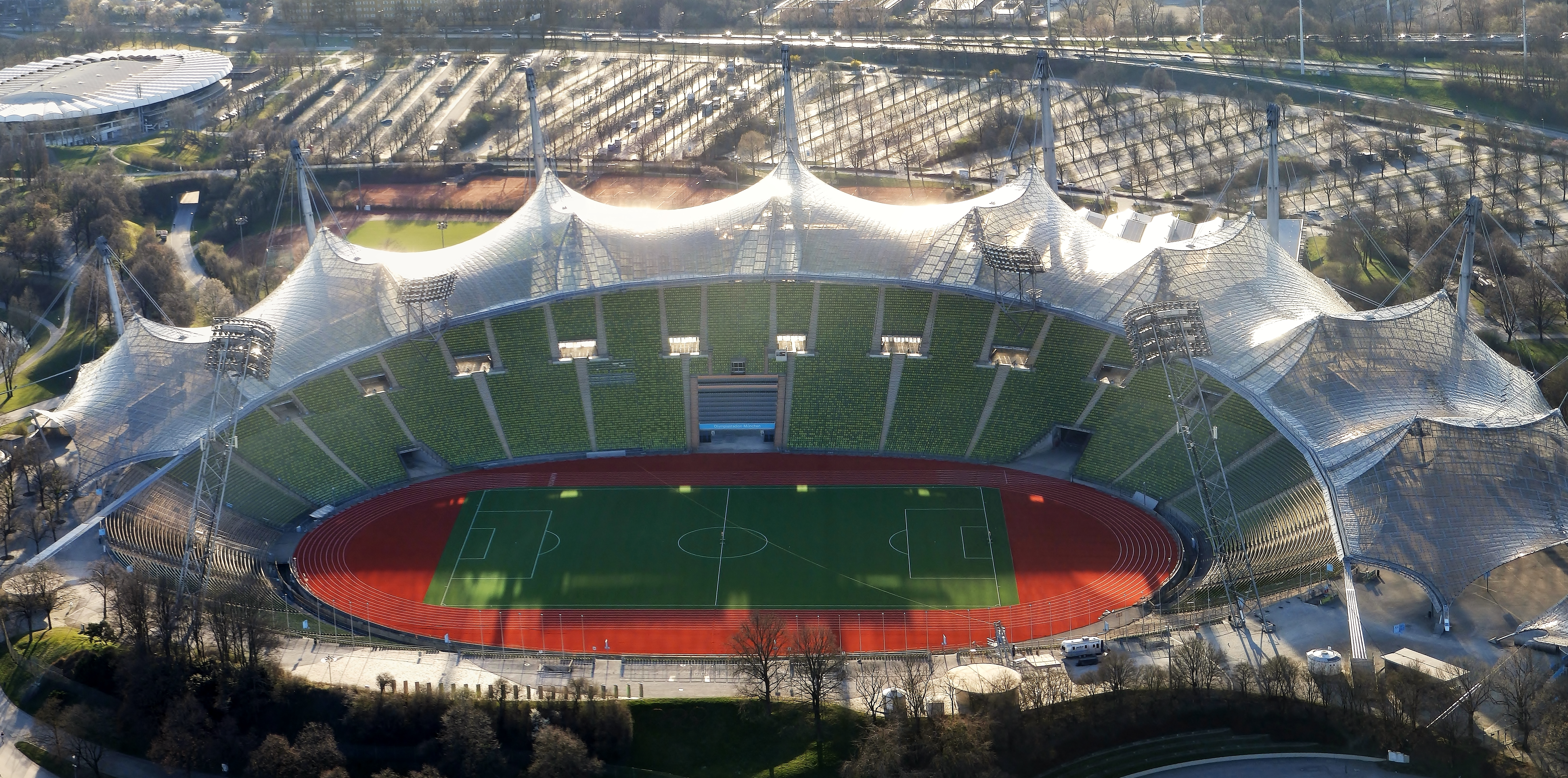
- Olympic Stadium (2014)
- Venue: Olympiastadion, Munich
- Date: September 10, 1972
- Competitors: 74 from 39 nations
- Winning time: 2:12:19

Medalists
1st place, gold medalist(s)		Frank Shorter; United States
2nd place, silver medalist(s)		Karel Lismont; Belgium
3rd place, bronze medalist(s)		Mamo Wolde; Ethiopia

The men's marathon at the 1972 Summer Olympics in Munich, West Germany was held on Sunday September 10, 1972. The race started at 15:00h local time. There were 74 competitors from 39 countries. Twelve of them did not finish. The maximum number of athletes per nation had been set at 3 since the 1930 Olympic Congress. The event was won by Frank Shorter of the United States, the nation's first Olympic marathon victory since 1908 and third overall (matching France and Ethiopia for most golds in the event). Karel Lismont won Belgium's second medal in the marathon with his silver (after a bronze in 1948). Mamo Wolde of Ethiopia became only the second man, after his countryman Abebe Bikila, to win two medals in the marathon. Ethiopia's four-Games medal streak was matched only by Finland (1920–1932).

== Summary ==
Frank Shorter, who was born in Munich, became the first American in 64 years to win the Olympic marathon, moving into the lead at 15 km and never being challenged.

Unfortunately, Shorter was not the first runner to enter the Olympic stadium, as West German student Norbert Südhaus had run onto the Olympic course wearing a West German track uniform, and ran the last kilometre, including a full lap of the stadium. Thinking that Südhaus was the winner, the crowd began cheering him before officials realized the hoax. Shorter arrived 35 seconds later, as Südhaus was being escorted off the track by security, and was perplexed to see someone ahead of him, and to hear the booing and jeering (meant for Südhaus).

This was the third time in Olympic history that an American had won the marathon, after Thomas Hicks in 1904 and Johnny Hayes in 1908, and in none of those three instances did the winner enter the stadium first: Hicks, like Shorter, was preceded by a hoaxer, whereas Hayes was declared the winner after Dorando Pietri of Italy was disqualified for receiving illegal assistance.

== Background ==
This was the 17th appearance of the event, which is one of 12 athletics events to have been held at every Summer Olympics. Returning runners from the 1968 marathon included defending champion Mamo Wolde (who had also run in 1964, along with his brother Demissie Wolde, who returned in 1972 after not competing in 1968), silver medalist Kenji Kimihara of Japan, fourth-place finisher İsmail Akçay of Turkey, seventh-place finisher Derek Clayton of Australia, and ninth-place finisher Akio Usami of Japan. Frank Shorter of the United States was favored after winning the Pan-American and Fukuoka marathons.

Bolivia, Haiti, North Korea, Malawi, Nicaragua, Somalia, Sri Lanka, Sudan, and Swaziland each made their first appearance in Olympic marathons. The United States made its 17th appearance, the only nation to have competed in each Olympic marathon to that point.

== Competition format and course ==
As all Olympic marathons, the competition was a single race. The marathon distance of 26 miles, 385 yards was run over a route created to resemble the mascot, Waldi. The course was arranged so that the head of the dog faced west, with athletes running counter-clockwise, starting at the back of the dog's neck and continuing around the ears. The mouth of the dog was represented by the path through the Nymphenburg Park, and its front feet were represented by the run through the Hirschgarten. The belly was the main downtown street in Munich, and its rear feet, rear end and tail were all in the English Garden, a parkland extending along the Isar River. The athletes continued along the back of the dog and entered the Olympic Stadium.

== Records ==
These were the standing world and Olympic records prior to the 1972 Summer Olympics.

World record	Derek Clayton (AUS)	2:08:33.6	Antwerp, Belgium	30 May 1969
Olympic record	Abebe Bikila (ETH)	2:12:11.2	Tokyo, Japan	21 October 1964

No new world or Olympic bests were set during the competition.

== Schedule ==
All times are Central European Time (UTC+1)

Date	Time	Round
Sunday, 10 September 1972	15:00	Final

== Results ==
Rank	Athlete	Nation	Time
1st place, gold medalist(s)	Frank Shorter	United States	2:12:19
2nd place, silver medalist(s)	Karel Lismont	Belgium	2:14:31
3rd place, bronze medalist(s)	Mamo Wolde	Ethiopia	2:15:08
4	Kenny Moore	United States	2:15:39
5	Kenji Kimihara	Japan	2:16:27
6	Ron Hill	Great Britain	2:16:30
7	Donald MacGregor	Great Britain	2:16:34
8	Jack Foster	New Zealand	2:16:56
9	Jack Bacheler	United States	2:17:38
10	Lengissa Bedane	Ethiopia	2:18:36
11	Seppo Nikkari	Finland	2:18:49
12	Akio Usami	Japan	2:18:58
13	Derek Clayton	Australia	2:19:49
14	Yury Velikorodnykh	Soviet Union	2:20:02
15	Anatolijus Baranovas	Soviet Union	2:20:10
16	Paul Angenvoorth	West Germany	2:20:19
17	Richard Mabuza	Swaziland	2:20:39
18	Demissie Wolde	Ethiopia	2:20:44
19	Reino Paukkonen	Finland	2:21:06
20	Colin Kirkham	Great Britain	2:21:54
21	Antonio Brutti	Italy	2:22:12
22	Dave McKenzie	New Zealand	2:22:19
23	Daniel McDaid	Ireland	2:22:25
24	Renato Martini	Italy	2:22:41
25	Eckhard Lesse	East Germany	2:22:49
26	Jacinto Sabinal	Mexico	2:22:56
27	Gyula Tóth	Hungary	2:22:59
28	Fernand Kolbeck	France	2:23:01
29	Hernán Barreneche	Colombia	2:23:40
30	Jørgen Jensen	Denmark	2:24:00
31	Manfred Steffny	West Germany	2:24:25
32	Lutz Philipp	West Germany	2:24:25
33	Ferenc Szekeres	Hungary	2:25:17
34	Terry Manners	New Zealand	2:25:29
35	Ihor Shcherbak	Soviet Union	2:25:37
36	Yoshiaki Unetani	Japan	2:25:59
37	Kim Chang-son	North Korea	2:26:45
38	Franco De Menego	Italy	2:26:52
39	Agustín Fernández	Spain	2:27:14
40	Edward Stawiarz	Poland	2:28:12
41	Armando Aldegalega	Portugal	2:28:24
42	Desmond McGann	Ireland	2:28:31
43	Carlos Cuque	Guatemala	2:28:37
44	Alfons Sidler	Switzerland	2:29:09
45	Alfredo Penaloza	Mexico	2:29:51
46	Walter Van Renterghem	Belgium	2:29:58
47	Donald Walsh	Ireland	2:31:12
48	Álvaro Mejía	Colombia	2:31:56
49	Ryu Man-hyong	North Korea	2:32:29
50	Carlos Pérez	Spain	2:33:22
51	Rafael Tadeo	Mexico	2:35:48
52	Víctor Mora	Colombia	2:37:34
53	Fernando Molina	Argentina	2:38:18
54	Julio Quevedo	Guatemala	2:40:38
55	Ramón Cabrera	Argentina	2:42:37
56	Matthews Kambale	Malawi	2:45:50
57	Hla Thein	Burma	2:48:53
58	Ricardo Condori	Bolivia	2:56:11
59	Fulgence Rwabu	Uganda	2:57:04
60	Bhakta Bahadur Sapkota	Nepal	2:57:58
61	Crispin Quispe	Bolivia	3:07:22
62	Maurice Charlotin	Haiti	3:29:21
—	Gaston Roelants	Belgium	DNF
—	Rodolfo Gómez	Nicaragua	DNF
—	İsmail Akçay	Turkey	DNF
—	Nazario Araújo	Argentina	DNF
—	Juvenal Rocha	Bolivia	DNF
—	Pekka Tiihonen	Finland	DNF
—	Richard Juma	Kenya	DNF
—	Jama Awil Aden	Somalia	DNF
—	Lucien Rosa	Ceylon	DNF
—	Shag Musa Medani	Sudan	DNF
—	Julius Wakachu	Tanzania	DNF
—	Jit Bahadur Khatri Chhetri	Nepal	DNF
—	Hüseyin Aktaş	Turkey	DNS
—	Josef Jánský	Czechoslovakia	DNS
