= 1970 Boston Marathon =

Footrace in Boston, Massachusetts, USA

- Venue: Boston, Massachusetts, U.S.
- Date: April 20, 1970
- Competitors: 1,011

Champions
- Men: Ron Hill (2:10:30)
- Women: Sara Mae Berman (3:05:07)

The 1970 Boston Marathon took place on Monday, April 20, 1970. It was the 74th time the Boston Marathon was organized and featured 1,174 official entrants, with 1,011 runners starting the event. The weather was described as "a steady downpour."

The race was won by Ron Hill of England in 2:10:30. Hill shattered the course record, set by Yoshiaki Unetani the prior year, by more than three minutes. Eamon O'Reilly of the United States finished second in 2:11:12, a new American record. Hill and O'Reilly were the first two runners in the event's history to break 2 hours 12 minutes. Hill's pace, 4:58.6 per mile, made him the first runner in Boston Marathon history to average below five minutes per mile. His course record stood until the 1975 edition, when it was broken by Bill Rodgers.

This was the first edition of the race to have a qualifying standard, as the entry form stipulated "A runner must submit the certification...that he has trained sufficiently to finish the course in less than four hours."

A disabled veteran in a wheelchair, Eugene Roberts, began before the official noon start of the race and went on to complete the course in approximately seven hours. Roberts is not recognized as a race champion. (Note: The first recognized wheelchair champion is Bob Hall of the 1975 Boston Marathon.)

== Results ==
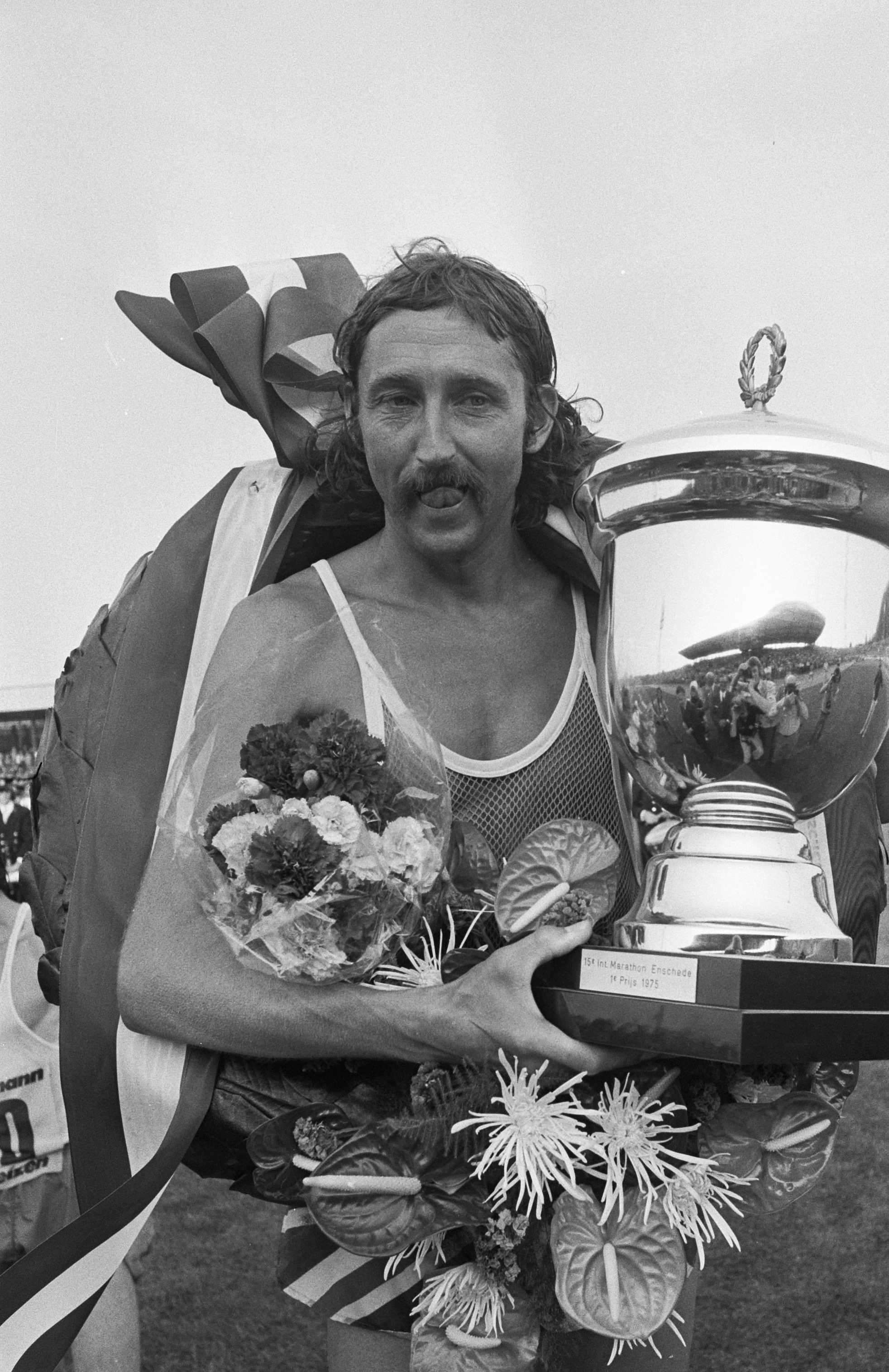
Ron Hill in 1975

=== Men ===
Position	Athlete	Nationality	Time
1	Ron Hill	England	2:10:30
2	Eamon O'Reilly	United States	2:11:12
3	Patrick McMahon	Ireland	2:14:53
4	Pentti Rummakko	Finland	2:14:59
5	Kalle Hakkarainen	Finland	2:19:42
6	Ken Moore	United States	2:19:47
7	Robert Moore	United Kingdom (Note: Boston Athletic Association records list Moore as being a Canadian resident; contemporary news reports noted that he was originally from England.)	2:20:07
8	Andy Boychuk	Canada	2:21:06
9	William Clark	United States	2:22:17
10	Wayne Yetman	Canada	2:22:32

Other notable participants included: Amby Burfoot (16th), José García (20th), John J. Kelley (63rd), and John A. Kelley (163rd).

=== Women ===
Women were not officially allowed to enter until 1972, but their first-place results from 1966 through 1971 were later ratified by the Boston Athletic Association. Sara Mae Berman, originally from The Bronx in New York City, finished first among women runners, credited with a time of 3:05:07. Berman is also recognized as the 1969 and 1971 women's champion.

Position	Athlete	Nationality	Time
1	Sara Mae Berman	United States	3:05:07
2	Nina Kuscsik	United States	3:12:16
3	Sandra Zerrangi	United States	3:30:00
4	Diane Fournier	United States	3:32:00
5	Kathrine Switzer	United States	3:34:00
