= Friedli =

Friedli is a surname. Notable people with the surname include:

- Simon Friedli (born 1991), Swiss bobsledder
- Edgar Friedli (born 1933), Swiss long-distance runner
- Roman Friedli (born 1979), Swiss footballer
- Sandra Friedli (born 1974), Swiss slalom canoeist
- Seraina Friedli (born 1993), Swiss footballer
- Thomas Friedli (1946–2008), Swiss clarinetist
- Valentine Friedli (1929-2016), Swiss politician
