= 1971 Boston Marathon =

Footrace in Boston, Massachusetts, USA

- Venue: Boston, Massachusetts, U.S.
- Date: April 19, 1971
- Competitors: 887

Champions
- Men: Álvaro Mejía (2:18:45)
- Women: Sara Mae Berman (3:08:30)

The 1971 Boston Marathon took place on Monday, April 19, 1971. It was the 75th time the Boston Marathon was organized and featured 1,067 official entrants, with 887 runners starting the event.

The race was won by Álvaro Mejía of Colombia in 2:18:45, finishing five seconds ahead of Pat McMahon of Ireland. The pair ran the final 15 miles (24 km) together, in what was described as "the most dramatic race in the 75-year history" of the event. It also set a mark for the narrowest margin of victory, which had previously been six seconds set during the 1906 edition.

== Results ==
=== Men ===
Position	Athlete	Nationality	Time
1	Álvaro Mejía	Colombia	2:18:45
2	Pat McMahon	Ireland	2:18:50
3	John Halberstadt	South Africa	2:22:23
4	John Vitale	United States	2:22:45
5	Byron Lowry	United States	2:23:20
6	Arthur Coolidge	United States	2:23:23
7	William Speck	United States	2:23:54
8	Markku Salminen	Finland	2:24:02
9	Ron Wallingford	Canada	2:25:21
10	William Clark	United States	2:26:19

Other notable participants included Amby Burfoot (39th) and John J. Kelley (96th).

=== Women ===
Women were not officially allowed to enter until 1972, but their first-place results from 1966 through 1971 were later ratified by the Boston Athletic Association. Sara Mae Berman, originally from The Bronx in New York City, finished first among women runners, credited with a time of 3:08:30. Berman is also recognized as the 1969 and 1970 women's champion.
