= Mary Hansen (disambiguation) =

Mary Hansen (1966–2002) was an Australian-born guitarist and singer.

Mary Hansen or Hanson may also refer to:

- Mary Hansen (anarchist) (1874–1952), Danish American schoolteacher and anarchist activist
- Mary Hansen (politician) (1935–1996), American rancher, businesswoman, and politician
- Mary Hanson (born 1944), American TV presenter
- Mary Joan Hansen, American former wife of TV presenter Chris Hansen
- Harold and Mary Jean Hanson Rare Book Collection
