= Eckhard Lesse =

German former long-distance runner (born 1948)

Personal information
- Born: 1 December 1948 Badeborn, Saxony-Anhalt, Germany
- Height: 1.79 m (5 ft 10 1/2 in)
- Weight: 62 kg (137 lb)

Sport
- Sport: Athletics
- Event: Long-distance running
- Club: SC Magdeburg
Medal record
Men's athletics
Representing East Germany
European Championships
Silver medal – second place	1974 Rome	Marathon

Eckhard Lesse (born 1 December 1948) is a German former long-distance runner. Lesse represented East Germany at the 1972 Summer Olympics and won silver in men's marathon at the 1974 European Championships.

== Career ==
Lesse represented East Germany at the 1971 European Championships in Helsinki, placing 24th in the 10,000 m. Lesse broke the East German marathon record for the first time in April 1972, running 2:13:19.4 in Karl-Marx-Stadt; he was the only East German selected for the 1972 Olympic marathon, where he placed 25th in 2:22:49.6.

Lesse broke the national record again in Manchester in June 1973, running 2:12:24. Later that year he placed third in the strong Fukuoka Marathon, behind Olympic champion Frank Shorter and Canada's Brian Armstrong; Track & Field News ranked Lesse the world's second best marathoner that year.

At the 1974 European Championships in Rome Lesse placed second to Great Britain's Ian Thompson in 2:14:57.4. Also in 1974, Lesse finished third behind Akio Usami at the British 1974 AAA Championships.

He placed second to Shorter in the 1974 Fukuoka Marathon, his time of 2:12:02.4 being another East German record; that year, he was ranked third in the world, behind Thompson and Shorter. Lesse was ranked in the world's top ten for a final time in 1975, when he placed fifth in Fukuoka in 2:12:42.6.

Lesse remained active in sports after his athletic career, and was president of his sports club, SC Magdeburg, in late 2009 and early 2010.
