= Demissie =

Demissie or Demisse (Amharic: ደመሰ) is a male given name of Ethiopian origin that may refer to:

- Demissie Tsige, Ethiopian author and journalist
- Demissie Wolde (born 1937), Ethiopian former marathon runner
- Debebe Demisse (born 1968), Ethiopian former cross country runner
