= Álvaro Mejía =

Álvaro Mejía may refer to:

- Álvaro Mejía Pérez (born 1982), Spanish football player
- Álvaro Mejía (cyclist) (born 1967), Colombian cyclist
- Álvaro Mejía (runner) (1940–2021), Colombian long-distance runner
