= Manchester Road Race =

Footrace in Manchester, Connecticut, United States

- The Manchester Road Race logo
- Date: Thanksgiving Day
- Location: Manchester, Connecticut, U.S.
- Event type: road
- Distance: 4.737 miles (7.623 km)
- Primary sponsor: ECHN
- Established: 1927
- Course records: Men: 20:55 (2025); Edwin Kurgat; Women: 22:55 (2021); Weini Kelati
- Website: ManchesterRoadRace.com

The Manchester Road Race is a 4.737 mile (7.623 km) footrace held annually on Thanksgiving Day in Manchester, Connecticut. Race proceeds are donated each year to Muscular Dystrophy research and about 18 other local charities. Beginning promptly at 10:00am every Thanksgiving Morning, the race attracts athletes of all ages and abilities. First run in 1927, the race regularly attracts accomplished runners from across the United States as well as internationally recognized competitors.

== History ==
The race was first held in 1927 with only twelve runners participating in the race. The race was conceived and promoted by the captain of the Manchester High School cross country team Frank "Duke" Haraburda, who competed and placed second in the inaugural race. The race continued annually until 1934, when the economic crisis during the Great Depression resulted in the race's cancellation. Consequently, the race was not held for 10 years (from 1935 to 1944), but began running again from 1945 to 2019, and will resume in 2021. In 1967 the race was recognized as the second largest race in the country, with more than 200 participants. Due to growing interest and participation in this event, the race surpassed 1,000 runners in 1976 and just ten years later attracted more than 6,000 runners. In 1994 the number of runners had reached 10,000 and in 2009 over 12,000 people officially ran the race. "The Manchester Road Race has grown to be the largest race in Connecticut, the third largest in New England and in the top 25 largest distance races in the country." (Manchester Road Race Committee)

In 1960, Julia Chase-Brand entered Manchester in hopes of participating in the road race, but she was turned down due to her gender. Race officials told her that if she ran she would be banned from racing for life. She lobbied to be allowed to race for a year, but without success. In 1961 she did run the race, without permission, but then racing's governing body vowed to ban her from all competition unless she agreed to stay out of "men's" road races. She agreed to stay out. Two other women, Chris McKenzie and Dianne Lechausse, also ran the race, although McKenzie veered off onto the sidewalk before the finish line so as not to get in trouble with racing officials. Julia finished in 33 minutes 40 seconds, which would have given her 128th place, ahead of 10 men, if her time was officially counted. Lechausse finished with a time of 41:12.

In 1977, the race committee created male and female divisions, rather than a single open registration.

Irish immigrant Ray Treacy finished second in the 1979 and 1981 races. He coached four Providence College runners who also won the MRR: Mark Caroll (1998 and 2000), Amy Rudolph (1995-97, 2000 and 2002), Kim Smith (2004 and 2005), and Emily Sisson (2017).

Haron Lagat of Kenya won the 2009 Race with a time of 21:40, beating Chicago's Patrick Smyth by one second—Smyth was also the runner up in 2008. Alemtsehay Misganaw, an Ethiopian who lives in New York City, won the 2009 women's race, beating five-time champion Amy Rudolph by a second.

Due to the COVID-19 pandemic, the 2020 edition of the race was held virtually.

In 2024, the course was remeasured and found to be nearly 60 ft shorter due to various repaving projects over the years.

== Overview ==
The official registration has been over 9,000 every year since 1991, with the highest registration of 15,000 in 2010. In addition to registered runners, many registered walkers and unregistered runners participate. The race committee estimates that approximately 1,000 unregistered runners participated in the 2005 race. Runners and fans wear costumes and may enter a competition to see who has the best costume each year. Famous among these costumed runners are the "Blues Brothers" and "Safety Man." Preceding the race, "Safety Man" will lead the runners and alert spectators along the course that the race has begun and runners are approaching.

== Notable runners ==
=== Joe McCluskey ===
Years won: 1930, 1931, 1932, 1947

Joe McCluskey was an American Olympic bronze medalist in the 1932 steeplechase who is recognized for winning the race four times. His brother John was the winner of the first race held in 1927. Joe's final Manchester Road Race victory came in 1947, 17 years after his first.

=== Amby Burfoot ===
Years won: 1968, 1969, 1971, 1972, 1973, 1974, 1975, 1976, 1977

Amby Burfoot is an American runner from New London, Connecticut who is known for winning the 1968 Boston Marathon. As of 2015, he had competed in the Manchester Road Race 53 times in a row, winning 9 times (7 consecutively). His 53 consecutive races is the record for the Manchester Road Race, breaking the record of barefoot runner, Charlie "Doc" Robbins, who ran 51, though missing two while serving in WWII. Burfoot later became a journalist, eventually becoming the Executive Editor of Runner's World magazine.

== Results ==
Year	Men's winner	Time (m:s)	Women's winner	Time (m:s)
1927	John McCluskey (USA)	29:46	N/A	N/A
1928	James Gwinn (USA)	27:44	N/A	N/A
1929			N/A	N/A
1930	Joe McCluskey (USA)		N/A	N/A
1931	Joe McCluskey (USA)		N/A	N/A
1932	Joe McCluskey (USA)		N/A	N/A
1933			N/A	N/A
1934			N/A	N/A
1935			N/A	N/A
1936			N/A	N/A
1937			N/A	N/A
1938			N/A	N/A
1939			N/A	N/A
1940			N/A	N/A
1941			N/A	N/A
1942			N/A	N/A
1943			N/A	N/A
1944			N/A	N/A
1945			N/A	N/A
1946			N/A	N/A
1947	Joe McCluskey (USA)		N/A	N/A
1948			N/A	N/A
1949			N/A	N/A
1950			N/A	N/A
1951	John J. Kelley (USA)	24:30	N/A	N/A
1952	John J. Kelley (USA)	25:33	N/A	N/A
1953	John J. Kelley (USA)	24:20	N/A	N/A
1954			N/A	N/A
1955			N/A	N/A
1956			N/A	N/A
1957	John J. Kelley (USA)	23:59	N/A	N/A
1958			N/A	N/A
1959	John J. Kelley (USA)		N/A	N/A
1960			N/A	N/A
1961	John J. Kelley (USA)	24:21	Julia Chase-Brand (USA)	33:40
1962	John J. Kelley (USA)	24:30	N/A	N/A
1963	Victor Zwolak (USA)	23:53.4	N/A	N/A
1964	Ralph Buschmann (CAN)	23:56	N/A	N/A
1965	Jim Keefe (USA)	24:15	N/A	N/A
1966	Ralph Buschmann (CAN)	23:14.8	N/A	N/A
1967	Arthur Dulong (USA)	23:15.5	N/A	N/A
1968	Amby Burfoot (USA)	22:34	N/A	N/A
1969	Amby Burfoot (USA)	22:38	N/A	N/A
1970	John Vitale (USA)	22:42	N/A	N/A
1971	Amby Burfoot (USA)	23:45	N/A	N/A
1972	Amby Burfoot (USA)	22:22	N/A	N/A
1973	Amby Burfoot (USA)	22:37	N/A	N/A
1974	Amby Burfoot (USA)	22:32	Cynthia Wadsworth (USA)	29:10
1975	Amby Burfoot (USA)	22:34	?	?
1976	Amby Burfoot (USA)	22:34	Cynthia Wadsworth (USA)	?
1977	Amby Burfoot (USA)	22:41	Elizabeth Berry (USA)	27:13
1978	John Treacy (IRL)	22:23	Gale Jones (USA)	29:02
1979	John Treacy (IRL)	21:26	Patty Catalano (USA)	25:37
1980	Charles Duggan (USA)	22:30	Ellyn Block (USA)	28:19
1981	Eamonn Coghlan (IRL)	21:37	Susan Richardson (USA)	?
1982	Eamonn Coghlan (IRL)	21:43	Sally Zimmer (USA)	27:41
1983	Eamonn Coghlan (IRL)	21:36	Janice Cataldo (USA)	26:56
1984	John Treacy (IRL)	21:52	Darlene Beckford (USA)	26:04
1985	John Treacy (IRL)	21:47	Judi St. Hilaire (USA)	24:40
1986	John Doherty (USA)	21:45	Leatrice Hayer (USA)	25:54
1987	John Doherty (USA)	21:31	Jill Harrison (USA)	25:35
1988	John Gregorek (USA)	21:30	Judi St. Hilaire (USA)	24:26
1989	John Gregorek (USA)	22:13	Judi St. Hilaire (USA)	25:05
1990	Christian Weber (USA)	21:47	Cathy O'Brien (USA)	24:12
1991	John Gregorek (USA)	21:36	Cathy O'Brien (USA)	24:06
1992	Richard Nerurkar (ENG)	21:33	Judi St. Hilaire (USA)	24:29
1993	John Gregorek (USA)	21:28	Mary Slaney (USA)	24:31
1994	Phillimon Hanneck (ZIM)	21:30	Lynn Jennings (USA)	24:33
1995	Phillimon Hanneck (ZIM)	21:19	Amy Rudolph (USA)	24:24
1996	Khalid Khannouchi (MAR)	21:36	Amy Rudolph (USA)	24:29
1997	Aurelio Miti (ANG)	21:44	Amy Rudolph (USA)	24:38
1998	Mark Carroll (IRL)	21:49	Deena Kastor (USA)	24:27
1999	David Makori (KEN)	21:27	Deena Kastor (USA)	24:12
2000	Mark Carroll (IRL)	21:49	Amy Rudolph (USA)	24:26
2001	Leonard Mucheru (KEN)	21:40	Svetlana Zakharova (RUS)	24:22
2002	Andrew Letherby (AUS)	22:03	Amy Rudolph (USA)	24:45
2003	Patrick Nthiwa (KEN)	21:36.7	Emilie Mondor (CAN)	23:58.5
2004	Patrick Nthiwa (KEN)	22:16	Kimberly Smith (NZL)	24:47
2005	Nicholas Willis (NZL)	21:49.8	Kimberly Smith (NZL)	24:22.3
2006	Ian Dobson (USA)	21:39	Shalane Flanagan (USA)	24:30
2007	Andrew Letherby (AUS)	21:53.4	Amy Begley (USA)	24:38.9
2008	Martin Fagan (IRL)	21:40.4	Misiker Mekonen (ETH)	24:59.6
2009	Harun Lagat (KEN)	21:39.1	Alemteshay Misganaw (ETH)	25:25.6
2010	Mourad Maroufit (MAR)	21:39	Sally Kipyego (KEN)	24:08
2011	Brian Olinger (USA)	21:33	Sally Kipyego (KEN)	24:22
2012	Aaron Braun (USA)	21:19.4	Delilah diCrescenzo (USA)	24:34
2013	Samuel Chelanga (KEN)	21:31.6	Alice Kamunya (KEN)	25:08
2014	Benjamin True (USA)	21:34.0	Diane Nukuri (BDI)	24:37.3
2015	Will Geoghegan (USA)	21:33.5	Diane Nukuri (BDI)	24:18.9
2016	Benjamin True (USA)	21:30.2	Emily Sisson (USA)	24:07.1
2017	Paul Chelimo (USA)	21:32	Buze Diriba (ETH)	23:56.5
2018	Edward Cheserek (KEN)	21:16	Celliphine Chespol (KEN)	24:33
2019	Eric Jenkins (USA)	21:19	Edna Kiplagat (KEN)	24:30
2020	Donn Cabral (USA)	23:00	Eilish McColgan (GBR)	25:15
2021	Ben Flanagan (CAN)	21:33	Weini Kelati (USA)	22:55
2022	Conner Mantz (USA)	21:04	Weini Kelati (USA)	23:39
2023	Morgan Beadlescomb (USA)	21:12	Weini Kelati (USA)	23:21
2024	Andrew Colley (USA)	21:09	Weini Kelati (USA)	23:14
2025	Edwin Kurgat (KEN)	20:54	Weini Kelati (USA)	23:18

== See also ==
- Turkey Trot
- Road running
