= Ramón Cabrera =

Ramón Cabrera may refer to:

- Ramón Cabrera, 1st Duke of Maestrazgo (1806–1877), Carlist general of Catalonia
- Ramón Cabrera (baseball) (born 1989), Venezuelan baseball catcher
- Ramón Cabrera (athlete) (born 1938), Argentine long-distance runner
