= Van Renterghem =

Van Renterghem is a surname of Dutch-language origin. People with that name include:

- Toine van Renterghem (1885–1967), Dutch international footballer
- Walter Van Renterghem (born 1944), Belgian long-distance runner
