= Michael Molloy =

Michael Molloy may refer to:

- Mike Molloy (born 1940), British author and former newspaper editor and cartoonist
- M. J. Molloy (1917–1994), Irish playwright
- Mick Molloy (born 1966), Australian comedian, writer and producer
- Mick Molloy (athlete) (1938–2023), Irish long-distance runner
- Mick Molloy (rugby union) (born 1944), Irish rugby union player
- Michael Molloy (politician) (1850–1926), Member of Parliament for Carlow County, 1910–1918

== See also ==
- Michael Malloy (1873–1933), Irish vagrant murdered in New York City
