= Crispin Quispe =

Bolivian long-distance runner (b. 1946)

Personal information
- Nationality: Bolivian
- Born: 13 May 1946
- Died: February 2026 (aged 79)

Sport
- Sport: Long-distance running
- Event: Marathon

Crispin Quispe (13 May 1946 – February 2026) was a Bolivian long-distance runner. He competed in the 10,000 metres and marathon at the 1972 Summer Olympics.

Quispe grew up in Potosí and worked in Uyuni, Bolivia. He mostly ate bananas and marraquetas due to not having money while training. Over his career, Quispe set seven Bolivian national records including in the 3000 metres, 3000 metres steeplechase, 5000 metres, 10,000 metres, and marathon.

At the 1972 Bolivian Olympic trials, Quispe finished 4th but he was allowed entry due to hitting a minimum standard.

Quispe qualified in two events at the 1972 Olympics. In the 10,000 metres, he finished 15th in his heat and did not advance to the finals. Nine days later in the marathon, Quispe ran a time of 3:07:23 hours to finish 61st overall. He became friends with his other national team members, though he was saddened to see Ricardo Condori leave for the United States following the Games.

While preparing for the 1977 Bolivarian Games, Quispe got sick and was referred to as "the forgotten athlete" by the Bolivian press. He was known for answering "I don't know" to questions by the press, and the saying "No sé" was associated with him in the public during his prime.

Quispe has been called one of the most favored Bolivian athletes of all time. In 2024, he advised Bolivian authorities to better develop their athletes and to make more use of the word "atleta" in general.

After retirement, Quispe moved to a small town about 40 kilometres from Uyuni and kept llamas. As he aged, Quispe had health issues concerning his lungs and became blind in one eye due to glaucoma. In April 2020, he was robbed in his house by thieves from Challapata and tied up while being asked for money. After being left overnight tied up, he escaped the next morning to find that the thieves had stolen a picota and his garrafas, and that they had killed his llamas. Quispe had been robbed of 2,500 Bolivianos previously.

His son Ludger Quispe was a national-level boxer.
