= 1968 Boston Marathon =

Footrace in Boston, Massachusetts, USA

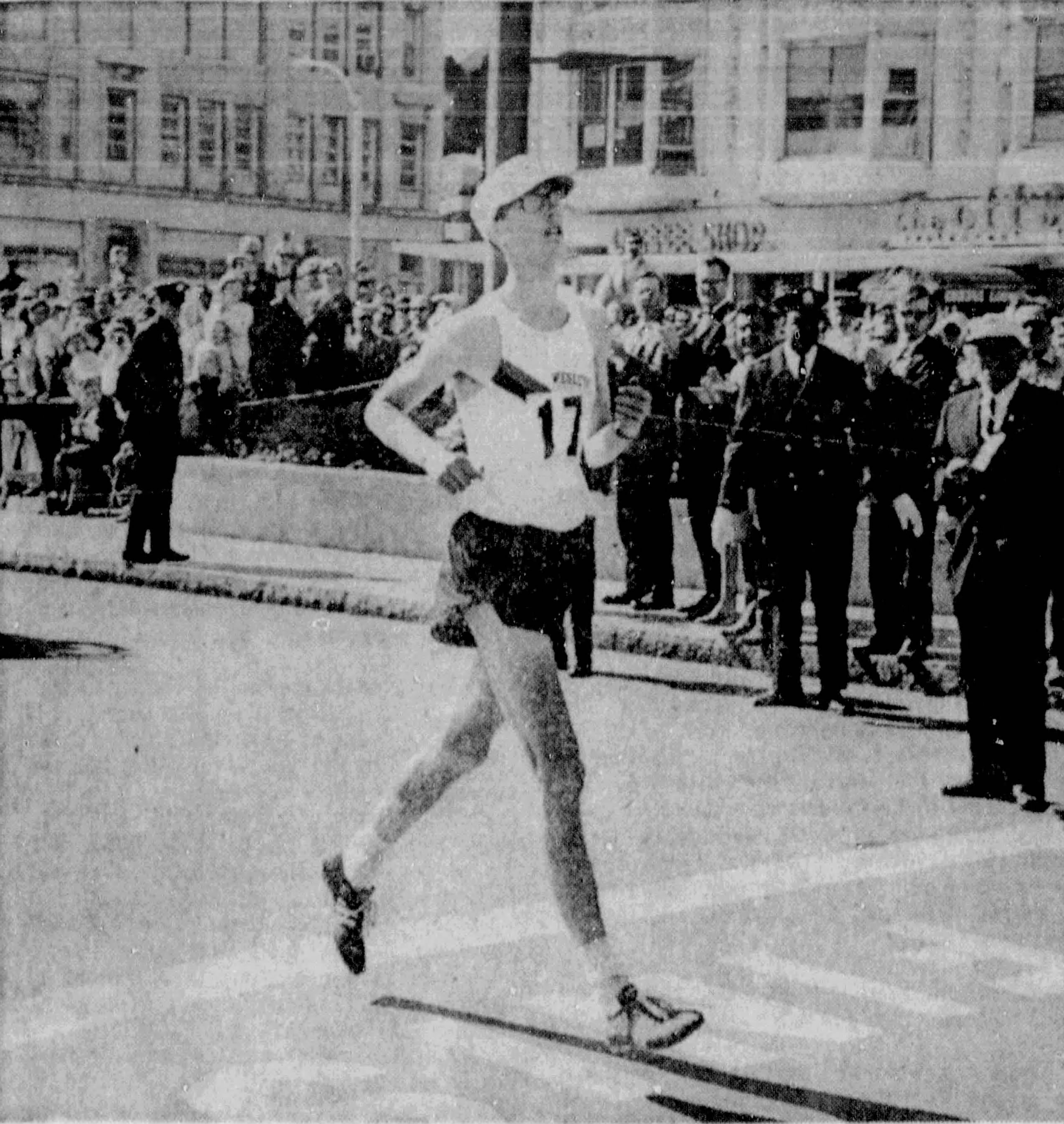
- Burfoot crossing the finish line
- Venue: Boston, Massachusetts, U.S.
- Date: April 19, 1968
- Competitors: 890

Champions
- Men: Amby Burfoot (2:22:17)
- Women: Bobbi Gibb (3:30:00)

The 1968 Boston Marathon took place on Friday, April 19, 1968. It was the 72nd time the Boston Marathon was organized. The race featured 1,012 official entrants, with 890 starting the race.

This was the final edition of the Boston Marathon run on a day other than Monday, as the Patriots' Day holiday was moved to the third Monday in April prior to the 1969 edition.

The race was won by Amby Burfoot, a senior at Wesleyan University, in 2:22:17.

== Results ==
=== Men ===
Position	Athlete	Nationality	Time
1	Amby Burfoot	United States	2:22:17
2	William Clark	United States	2:22:49
3	Alfredo Peñaloza	Mexico	2:25:06
4	Pablo Garrido	Mexico	2:25:07
5	Ron Daws	United States	2:29:17
6	Bob Deines	United States	2:30:13
7	José García	Mexico	2:30:29
8	Mikko Ala-Leppilampi	Finland	2:31:35
9	Danny McFadzean	United Kingdom	2:32:27
10	August Mulreke	United States	2:34:15

Other notable participants included John J. Kelley (14th).

=== Women ===
Women were not officially allowed to enter until 1972, but their first-place results from 1966 through 1971 were later ratified by the Boston Athletic Association. Bobbi Gibb of Winchester, Massachusetts, finished first among women runners, credited with a time of 3:30:00. Gibb is also recognized as the 1966 and 1967 women's champion.
