= George A. Hirsch =

American magazine publisher (born 1934)

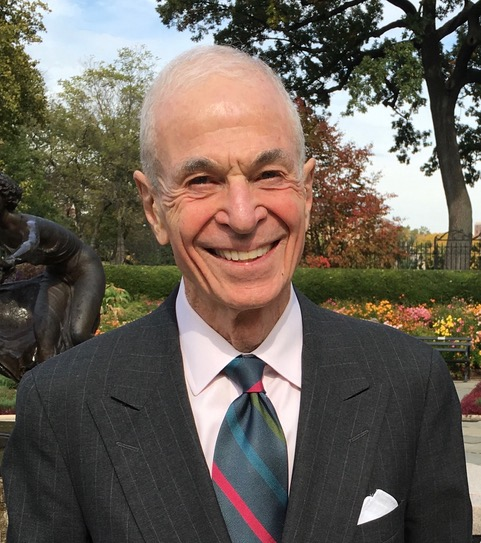
- Hirsh in 2015
- Born: June 21, 1934 (age 92); New York City, U.S.
- Education: Princeton University (BA); Harvard Business School (MBA)
- Known for: Magazine publisher, running executive, former U.S. Congressional candidate

George Aaron Hirsch (born June 21, 1934) is an American magazine publisher, a founder of the five-borough New York City Marathon, a former unsuccessful candidate for Congress, and a television commentator. Hirsch was founding publisher of New York, New Times, and The Runner magazines. He also was publisher of Runner’s World, the first publishing director of Men's Health, and the publisher of La Cucina Italiana. He was the chairman of the board of New York Road Runners from 2005 until June 2023, when he became chairman emeritus.

== Early life and education ==
Hirsch was born on June 21, 1934, in New York City and grew up in New Rochelle, where he attended public schools. He graduated magna cum laude from Princeton University in 1956 with a BA in history and then from Harvard Business School in 1962.

He served as a U.S. Navy officer on a landing ship tank (LST) ported in Naples, Italy from 1957 to 1960. He and Shay Scrivner were married in 1989, the second marriage for each of them. He has two sons, David and William, and two stepsons, Ian Scrivner and Sean Scrivner.

== Career ==
=== Magazine publishing ===
Hirsch spent five years at Time–Life International from 1962 to 1967 becoming assistant publisher of Life International and Life en Espanol in 1965. In 1967, he joined Clay Felker to prepare for the launch of New York magazine as the new magazine's president and publisher. The first issue of New York magazine was published in April 1968. In 1973, he founded New Times, which he published until it folded in 1979.

While publishing New Times, Hirsch launched The Runner magazine in 1978. In January 1987, Rodale, Inc., an Emmaus, Pennsylvania-based publisher of magazines and books, acquired The Runner and merged it with Runner’s World, where he became worldwide publisher after launching a number of international editions of the magazine. Hirsch was the first publishing director of Men's Health and director of international magazines, positions he held until his retirement from Rodale in 2004. From 2005 to 2011, he was the chairman and publisher of La Cucina Italiana, the English language edition of the Milan-based food and cooking magazine, which is the oldest such magazine in Italy.

=== Running ===
Hirsch helped Fred Lebow start the five-borough New York City Marathon in 1976 to celebrate the nation’s bicentennial. With the success of the first race, it became an annual event that has become one of the world’s leading sporting events. In 1979, Hirsch founded the Midnight Run in New York’s Central Park, a race that is held every New Year’s Eve. From 1984 to 1986, Hirsch was the on air host of a weekly segment on ESPN's SportsCenter called "The Runner’s Corner." He has done television commentary for many distance running events including the New York City, Boston, Los Angeles, San Francisco, and Cincinnati Flying Pig marathons. He has also been a commentator for three Olympic Games: the 1984 Summer Olympics in Los Angeles, the 1988 Summer Olympics in Seoul, and the 1992 Summer Olympics in Barcelona.

Beginning with the 1969 Boston Marathon, Hirsch has run forty marathons with a personal best of 2:38 set in Boston in 1979 at the age of 44. He ran much of that race with Joan Benoit, who went on to win the first women’s Olympic marathon in 1984. In 2009, on a promise to his wife Shay, he ran his final marathon in New York at age 75. He won his age group in each of his last eleven marathons. Hirsch became the chairman of the New York Road Runners in 2005. Each year in conjunction with the New York City Marathon, the George Hirsch Journalism Award is given to a writer who has made a significant contribution to the sport of running. Hirsch's own running journalism and commentary has appeared frequently in The New York Times. Hirsch is currently co-host of the podcast "Running—State of the Sport," with Amby Burfoot.

=== Congressional candidacy and awards ===
Hirsch was the unsuccessful Democratic candidate for Congress in Manhattan’s Upper East Side in 1986.

In 1988, he was a delegate at the Democratic National Convention. He was on the board of Salon Media Group from 2000 to 2017. In 2003, Hirsch was the recipient of the National Distance Running Hall of Fame George Sheehan Journalism Award. In 2014, Hirsch was the recipient of a lifetime achievement award from the Association of International Marathons and Distance Races, and in 2017 he was inducted into the Road Runners Club of America Hall of Fame. In 2019, he was knighted with the title of "Ufficiale dell’Ordine della Stella d’Italia" by the Republic of Italy for his role as an ambassador of Italian culture, and was named USATF's 2019 Masters Athlete of the Year for the 85-89 age group. In 2024, Hirsch was awarded the Abebe Bikila Award, given to an individual who has made an outstanding contribution to the sport of distance running.. In 2026, he was inducted into the NYRR Hall of Fame and served as an honorary Grand Marshall of the 2026 New York City Marathon..
