= Anatoly Sukharkov =

Soviet long-distance runner

Personal information
- Nationality: Soviet
- Born: 10 February 1938 (age 88) Kaliningrad, Soviet Union

Sport
- Sport: Long-distance running
- Event: Marathon

Anatoly Vasilyevich Sukharkov (Russian: Анатолий Васильевич Сухарьков; born 10 February 1938) is a Soviet long-distance runner. He competed in the marathon at the 1968 Summer Olympics.
