= Antonino Mangano =

Italian runner (1950–2026)

Personal information
- Born: 3 December 1950 Sicily, Italy
- Died: 8 January 2026 (aged 75) Ponte San Nicolò, Italy

Sport
- Sport: Track and field
- Event(s): Marathon; Long-distance running

Antonino Mangano (3 December 1950 – 8 January 2026) was an Italian marathon and middle-distance runner. A recipient of the Star for Sporting Merit, he competed in the men's marathon event at the 1974 European Athletics Championships.

Mangano died on 8 January 2026, at the age of 75.
