= Nikola Simeonov =

Bulgarian long-distance runner

Personal information
- Nationality: Bulgarian
- Born: 19 November 1939 (age 86) Petrich, Bulgaria

Sport
- Sport: Long-distance running
- Event: Marathon

Nikola Simeonov (Bulgarian: Никола Симеонов; born 19 November 1939) is a Bulgarian former long-distance runner. He competed in the marathon at the 1968 Summer Olympics. He finished in 42nd place.
