= Godwin Kalimbwe =

Zambian long-distance runner

Personal information
- Nationality: Zambian
- Born: 27 February 1946 (age 80)

Sport
- Sport: Long-distance running
- Event: Marathon

Godwin Kalimbwe (born 27 February 1946) is a Zambian long-distance runner. He competed in the marathon at the 1968 Summer Olympics.
