= Seiichiro Sasaki =

Japanese long-distance runner

Personal information
- Nationality: Japanese
- Born: 2 September 1945 (age 81) Saga, Japan

Sport
- Sport: Long-distance running
- Event: Marathon

Seiichiro Sasaki (佐々木 精一郎, Sasaki Seiichirō; born 2 September 1945) is a Japanese long-distance runner. He competed in the marathon at the 1968 Summer Olympics.

Sasaki achieved a personal best in the marathon of 2:11:17, set in the 1967 Fukuoka Marathon, finishing second behind Derek Clayton, who ran 2:09:36.4, a world record for the marathon distance at that time. Sasaki's performance in this marathon was the second fastest in history up to that time.
