= Alfons Sidler =

Swiss long-distance runner

Personal information
- Nationality: Swiss
- Born: 1 November 1934
- Died: 18 February 2019 (aged 84)

Sport
- Sport: Long-distance running
- Event: Marathon

Alfons Sidler (1 November 1934 – 18 February 2019) was a Swiss long-distance runner. He competed in the marathon at the 1972 Summer Olympics.
