= Ryu Man-hyong =

North Korean long-distance runner

Personal information
- Nationality: North Korean
- Born: 8 January 1941 (age 85)

Sport
- Sport: Long-distance running
- Event: Marathon

Ryu Man-hyong (born 8 January 1941) is a North Korean long-distance runner. He competed in the marathon at the 1972 Summer Olympics.
