= New Times (magazine) =

American glossy bi-weekly national newspaper

- Frequency: Bi-weekly
- Circulation: 350,000
- Publisher: George A. Hirsch
- ISSN: 0092-2463
- OCLC: 1789075

New Times was an American glossy bi-weekly national newspaper published from 1973 to 1979 by George A. Hirsch.

== History ==
Hirsch had been publisher of New York magazine, but resigned after conflicts with Clay Felker, the magazine's founder and editor. New Times began as a bridge between the newsweeklies and the more reflective monthly opinion magazines, notably Harper's and The Atlantic. The first issue appeared in October 1972. Initially, the magazine featured a marquee roster of the era's best-known new journalists, including Jimmy Breslin, Pete Hamill, Jack Newfield, Mike Royko, and Dick Schaap.

However, as the magazine's ad revenues lagged, contributions from the big names soon dried up, and under the editorship of Jonathan Larsen, New Times shifted to a more investigative journalistic approach, publishing articles on topics such as the CIA, congressional committees, political spying, political activism, the murder of Mary Pinchot Meyer, the cult or system of psychological training est and the JFK assassination "cover up" thesis.

=== Contributors ===
Contributors were often freelance writers, many just out of college, including Frank Rich, Ron Rosenbaum, Nina Totenberg, Harry Stein, and Geoffrey Wolff. Robert Sam Anson was political editor and Robert Shrum was a political columnist. The late NBC television executive Brandon Tartikoff was an occasional contributor.

Typical of the magazine's later direction, one issue featured a cover depicting Bozo the Clown behind the Presidential podium, a broad comment on the mistakes and misadventures of then-U.S. President Gerald Ford. Another issue saluted the 10 Dumbest Congressmen, judging Charles Grassley, then a Representative from Iowa, as the so-called King of Dumb.

New Times never found a sufficient base of advertisers. The magazine's final issue was published on January 8, 1979. Hirsch then launched The Runner magazine, one of the first of a new era of specialty "active lifestyle" monthlies in 1979, after initially creating it as the New York City Marathon's official program in 1977.
