= Wimalasena Perera =

Sri Lankan long-distance runner

Personal information
- Full name: Rupasinghe A. Wimalasena Perera
- Nationality: Sri Lankan
- Born: 30 May 1945 (age 81) Colombo, Sri Lanka

Sport
- Sport: Long-distance running
- Event: Marathon

Rupasinghe A. Wimalasena Perera (born 30 May 1945) is a Sri Lankan former long-distance runner. He competed in the marathon at the 1968 Summer Olympics.
