= Mukhamed Shakirov =

Soviet long-distance runner

Personal information
- Nationality: Soviet
- Born: 19 March 1933 (age 93) Soviet Union

Sport
- Sport: Long-distance running
- Event: Marathon

Mukhamed Shakirov (born 19 March 1933) is a Soviet long-distance runner. He competed in the marathon at the 1968 Summer Olympics.
