= Antonio Brutti =

Italian long-distance runner (born 1945)

Personal information
- Nationality: Italian
- Born: 2 May 1945 (age 81) Grottammare, Italy

Sport
- Sport: Long-distance running
- Event: Marathon

Antonio Brutti (born 2 May 1945) is an Italian long-distance runner. He competed in the marathon at the 1972 Summer Olympics.
