= Mamo Wolde =

Ethiopian marathon runner (1932–2002)

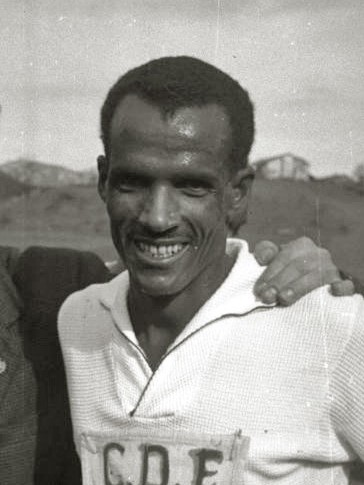
- Wolde in 1963

Personal information
- Native name: ማሞ ወልዴ
- Born: Degaga Wolde; 22 June 1932 Ada'a, Ethiopian Empire
- Died: 26 May 2002 (aged 69) Addis Ababa, Ethiopia
- Resting place: Saint Joseph's Church; 8°58′11.57″N 38°46′1.51″E
- Height: 170 cm (5 ft 7 in)
- Weight: 54 kg (119 lb)

Sport
- Sport: Athletics
- Events: Marathon; 10,000 metres

Achievements and titles
- Personal bests: 800 m: 1:58.0 (1956); 1500 m: 3:51.0 (1956); 5000 m: 13:38.8 (1967); 10,000 m: 28:31.8 (1964); One hour: 19,945 (1962); Marathon: 2:15:09 (1972)
Medal record
Men's athletics
Representing Ethiopia
Olympic Games
| Gold medal – first place | 1968 Mexico City | Marathon |
| Silver medal – second place | 1968 Mexico City | 10,000 m |
| Bronze medal – third place | 1972 Munich | Marathon |

Degaga "Mamo" Wolde (Amharic: ማሞ ወልዴ; 12 June 1932 – 26 May 2002) was an Ethiopian long-distance runner who competed in track, cross-country, and road running events. He was the winner of the marathon at the 1968 Summer Olympics.

== Early life ==
Degaga was born on 12 June 1932 in Ada'a to an Oromo family. His younger brother, Demissie Wolde (b. 8 March 1937), also became an international distance running star.

In 1951, Degaga moved to Addis Ababa.

== Athletics career ==
At his first Olympic appearance in 1956, Degaga competed in the 800 m, 1,500 m and the 4x400 relay.

He did not compete in the 1960 Summer Olympics, when Abebe Bikila became the first Ethiopian to win a gold medal. Degaga claimed his absence was due to the government's desire to send him on a peacekeeping mission to the Congo during the Congo Crisis. According to him, in the government's ensuing conflict with the Ethiopian Olympic Committee, who wanted him to compete, he did not get sent to either event. However, athlete Said Moussa Osman, who represented Ethiopia in the 800 m at the 1960 Olympics, stated that Degaga lost at the trials and did not make it to the team.

Beginning in the 1960s, Degaga's focus changed from middle distance races to long distances. He made Ethiopia's first mark at international cross-country races when he took the International Juan Muguerza in Elgoibar, Spain, winning in 1963 and 1964, and at the Cross de San Donostin in San Sebastian, Spain, in the same years. He placed fourth in the 10,000 m at the 1964 Summer Olympics, which was won by Billy Mills of the United States in one of the biggest upsets in the history of Olympic competition. Demissie also became a marathon runner.

Both brothers competed in Tokyo, in the 1964 Olympic marathon. On 3 August 1964, in the Ethiopian Olympic trials, a race held at 8,000 feet, Degaga qualified by running 2:16:19.2, just 4/10ths of a second behind Abebe Bikela, with Demissie finishing 2:19:30, for 3rd place. Although Degaga dropped out early, Demessie, after being among the leaders for much of the 1964 Olympic race, finished tenth in 2:21:25.2. On 21 April 1965, as part of the opening ceremonies for the second season of the 1964/1965 New York World's Fair, Abebe and Degaga participated in an exclusive ceremonial half marathon. They ran from the Arsenal in Central Park at 64th Street & Fifth Avenue in Manhattan to the Singer Bowl at the fair. They carried with them a parchment scroll with greetings from Haile Selassie. In 1967, he repeated his wins in San Sebastian and Elgiobar, and won again at the latter event in 1968.

In the 1968 Summer Olympics, Degaga became the second Ethiopian to win gold in the marathon. Earlier in the same Olympics, he had won the silver medal in the 10,000 m. At the age of 40, Degaga won his third Olympic medal placing third in 2:15:08 at the 1972 Olympic marathon, while Demissie placed 18th in 2:20:44.0. Degaga also won the marathon race in the 1973 All-Africa Games. He blamed his Olympic third place showing in 1972 on ill-fitting shoes forced on him by Ethiopian officials. He became only the second person in Olympic history (Bikila was the first) to medal in successive Olympic marathons. Both medalists who finished ahead of Degaga, Frank Shorter from the U.S.A., and Belgium's Karel Lismont would repeat Degaga's feat in 1976 as they finished second and third behind East Germany's Waldemar Cierpinski. Cierpinski repeated his win in 1980. Since Cierpnski, Erick Wainaina finished third in Atlanta in 1996 and second in Sydney in 2000, and Eliud Kipchoge won in Rio in 2016 and in Tokyo in 2021. Degaga also won the marathon race in the 1973 All-Africa Games.

== Military career ==
In 1951, Degaga joined the Imperial Guard. He later served as a peacekeeper in Korea from 1953 to 1955.

== Arrest ==
In 1993, Degaga was arrested on the accusation that he participated in a Red Terror execution during the regime of the dictator Mengistu Haile Mariam. He argued that although he was present at the killing, he was not a direct participant. The IOC campaigned the Ethiopian government for his release. In early 2002 he was convicted and sentenced to six years of imprisonment. Therefore, he was released because he had spent nine years in detention already waiting for his trial.

== Death ==
On 26 May 2002, Degaga died of liver cancer at age 69, just a few months after his release. He had been married twice and had three children; a son, Samuel, with his first wife, and two children, Addis Alem and Tabor, with his second wife. Degaga is interred in Saint Joseph's Church Cemetery in Addis Ababa.
