= Helmut Kunisch =

Swiss long-distance runner

Personal information
- Nationality: Swiss
- Born: 26 November 1936 Hindelbank, Switzerland
- Died: 22 December 2021 (aged 85) Spiez, Switzerland

Sport
- Sport: Long-distance running
- Event: Marathon

Helmut Kunisch (26 November 1936 – 22 December 2021) was a Swiss long-distance runner. He competed in the marathon at the 1968 Summer Olympics.
