= 1971 New York City Marathon =

Footrace held in New York City

- Date: 19 September
- Location: (United States) New York City, NY
- Event type: Marathon
- Distance: 42.195 km
- Edition: 2nd
- Course records: 2:22:54 (1971 men); 2:55:22 (1971 women)
- Website: Official website

The 1971 New York City Marathon was the 2nd edition of the New York City Marathon and took place in New York City on 19 September.

== Results ==
=== Men ===
Rank	Athlete	Country	Time
1	Norm Higgins	United States	2:22:54
2	Chuck Ceronsky	United States	2:33:21
3	Max White	United States	2:33:52
4	Tom Derderian	United States	2:37:13
5	Hugh Sweeny	United States	2:37:42
6	John Garlepp	United States	2:38:53
7	William Kinsella	United States	2:40:11
8	Agustin Calle	United States	2:40:33
9	Bill Gordon	United States	2:40:36
10	Eric Walther	United States	2:40:52

=== Women ===
Rank	Athlete	Country	Time
1	Beth Bonner	United States	2:55:22 (wr)
2	Nina Kuscsik	United States	2:56:04
3	Sara Mae Berman	United States	3:08:46
4	Pat Tarnawsky	United States	4:45:37
