= Athletics at the 1971 Pan American Games – Men's 10,000 metres =

Men's 10,000 metres at the Pan American Games

The men's 10,000 metres event at the 1971 Pan American Games was held in Cali on 31 July.

== Results ==
Rank	Name	Nationality	Time	Notes
1st place, gold medalist(s)	Frank Shorter	United States	28:50.83	GR
2nd place, silver medalist(s)	Juan Máximo Martínez	Mexico	29:05.07	
3rd place, bronze medalist(s)	Álvaro Mejía	Colombia	29:06.93	
4	Gary Bjorklund	United States	29:18.35	
5	Pedro Miranda	Mexico	30:13.16	
6	Domingo Tibaduiza	Colombia	30:52.65	
7	Rafael Pérez	Costa Rica	30:54.13	
8	Victoriano López	Guatemala	31:25.67	
9	Robert Legge	Canada	32:15.34	
10	?		32:16.12	
11	?		32:48.26	
	Carlos Cuque López	Guatemala	DNS	
