= Juvenal Rocha =

Bolivian long-distance runner

Personal information
- Nationality: Bolivian
- Born: 3 May 1948 (age 78)

Sport
- Sport: Long-distance running
- Event: Marathon

Juvenal Rocha (born 3 May 1948) is a Bolivian long-distance runner. He competed in the marathon at the 1972 Summer Olympics which he did not finish.
