= Franco De Menego =

Italian long-distance runner

Personal information
- Nationality: Italian
- Born: 8 September 1944 (age 81)

Sport
- Sport: Long-distance running
- Event: Marathon

Franco De Menego (born 8 September 1944) is an Italian long-distance runner. He competed in the marathon at the 1972 Summer Olympics.
