= Ron Daws =

American runner

Ron Daws (June 21, 1937 – July 28, 1992) was an American long-distance runner and 1968 Summer Olympics men's marathon athlete. Born in Minneapolis, Minnesota, he won the 1967 National AAU Marathon. and then competed at the 1967 Pan-American Games marathon. He was a top-five finisher in both the 1968 Boston Marathon and 1969 Boston Marathon.

Daws was a friend of Steve Hoag and Jim Berka. The three often finished 1-2-3 in Minnesota races. He was married to Lorraine Moller in the 1980s, who he later divorced.

In 1984, Daws appeared on The Mary Hanson Show (named after his wife, Mary Hanson, whom he married in October 1991). Daws died of a heart attack in 1992.

The Minnesota Distance Running Association named the Ron Daws 25K race in Minneapolis in his honor in 1993.

== Publications ==
- Self-Made Olympian, Anderson World, 1977, ISBN 978-0-89037-103-9
- "Marathon Training" (article), Marathoner, Spring 1978
- Running Your Best: The Committed Runner's Guide to Training and Racing, Stephen Greene Press, 1985, ISBN 978-0-8289-0559-6
