= Maurice Charlotin =

Haitian long-distance runner

Personal information
- Nationality: Haitian
- Born: 6 December 1944 (age 81)

Sport
- Sport: Long-distance running
- Event: Marathon

Maurice Charlotin (born 6 December 1944) is a Haitian long-distance runner. He competed in the marathon at the 1972 Summer Olympics.
