= Fulgencio Hernández =

Guatemalan long-distance runner

Personal information
- Born: 1 January 1941 (age 85) Jalapa, Guatemala

Sport
- Sport: Long-distance running
- Event: Marathon

Fulgencio Hernández (born 1 January 1941) is a Guatemalan long-distance runner. He competed in the marathon at the 1968 Summer Olympics.
