= Alfredo Peñaloza =

Mexican long-distance runner

Alfredo Peñaloza Carmona (born 31 March 1947 in Mexico City) is a Mexican former long-distance runner who competed in the 1968 Summer Olympics and in the 1972 Summer Olympics. He was third in the 1967 Pan American Games marathon. He finished third in both the 1968 Boston Marathon and 1969 Boston Marathon.

== International competitions ==
Year	Competition	Venue	Position	Event	Notes
Representing Mexico
1967	Pan American Games	Winnipeg, Canada	3rd	Marathon	2:27:49
1968	Boston Marathon	Boston, United States	3rd	Marathon	2:25:06
1968	Olympic Games	Mexico City, Mexico	13th	Marathon	2:29:48
1969	Boston Marathon	Boston, United States	3rd	Marathon	2:19:56
1970	Central American and Caribbean Games	Panama City, Panama	1st	Marathon	2:47:23
1972	Olympic Games	Munich, West Germany	45th	Marathon	2:29:51
