= Martin Ande =

Nigerian long-distance runner

Personal information
- Nationality: Nigerian
- Born: 12 April 1948 (age 78)

Sport
- Sport: Long-distance running
- Event: Marathon

Martin Ande (born 12 April 1948) is a Nigerian long-distance runner. He competed in the marathon at the 1968 Summer Olympics.
