= 1974 European Athletics Championships – Men's marathon =

Men's marathon at the European Athletics Championships

The men's marathon at the 1974 European Athletics Championships was held in Rome, Italy, on 8 September 1974.

== Medalists ==
Gold	Ian Thompson; Great Britain
Silver	Eckhard Lesse; East Germany
Bronze	Gaston Roelants; Belgium

== Results ==
=== Final ===
8 September

Rank	Name	Nationality	Time	Notes
1st place, gold medalist(s)	Ian Thompson	Great Britain	2:13:18.8	
2nd place, silver medalist(s)	Eckhard Lesse	East Germany	2:14:57.4	
3rd place, bronze medalist(s)	Gaston Roelants	Belgium	2:16:29.6	
4	Bernie Plain	Great Britain	2:18:02.2	
5	Jose Reveyn	Belgium	2:19:36.4	
6	Ferenc Szekeres	Hungary	2:20:12.8	
7	Giuseppe Cindolo	Italy	2:20:28.2	
8	Neil Cusack	Ireland	2:22:05.0	
9	Paavo Leiviskä	Finland	2:22:45.6	
10	Yuriy Laptyev	Soviet Union	2:23:15.6	
11	Paolo Accaputo	Italy	2:24:06.0	
12	Danny McDaid	Ireland	2:25:07.8	
13	Jørgen Jensen	Denmark	2:26:54.2	
14	Bob Sercombe	Great Britain	2:27:13.0	
15	Josef Jánský	Czechoslovakia	2:27:40.4	
16	Edward Łęgowski	Poland	2:27:45.8	
17	Václav Mládek	Czechoslovakia	2:30:16.8	
18	Peter Suchán	Czechoslovakia	2:30:42.6	
19	Reino Paukkonen	Finland	2:31:11.2	
20	Günter Mielke	West Germany	2:32:21.6	
21	Ryszard Chudecki	Poland	2:34:15.0	
22	Anatoliy Strelets	Soviet Union	2:34:55.2	
	Antonino Mangano	Italy	DNF	
	Yury Velikorodnykh	Soviet Union	DNF	
	Karel Lismont	Belgium	DNF	
	Agustin Fernandez	Spain	DNF	
	Peter Helmer	Denmark	DNF	
	Atanas Galabov	Bulgaria	DNF	
	Theofanis Tsimingatos	Greece	DNF	
	Fernand Kolbeck	France	DNF	
	Jochen Schirmer	West Germany	DNS	

== Participation ==
According to an unofficial count, 30 athletes from 16 countries participated in the event.

- Belgium (3)
- Bulgaria (1)
- Czechoslovakia (3)
- Denmark (2)
- East Germany (1)
- Finland (2)
- France (1)
- Greece (1)
- Hungary (1)
- Ireland (2)
- Italy (3)
- Poland (2)
- Soviet Union (3)
- Spain (1)
- Great Britain (3)
- West Germany (1)
