= Josef Gwerder =

Swiss long-distance runner

Personal information
- Nationality: Swiss
- Born: 12 January 1939 (age 87) Ibach, Switzerland

Sport
- Sport: Long-distance running
- Event: Marathon

Josef Gwerder (born 12 January 1939) is a Swiss long-distance runner. He competed in the marathon at the 1968 Summer Olympics.
