= Sara Mae Berman =

American marathon runner

Personal information
- Born: Sara Mae Sidore; May 14, 1936 (age 90) The Bronx, New York City
- Occupation: Athlete

Sport
- Country: United States
- Sport: Marathon
- Retired: 2000

Sara Mae Berman (née Sidore born 14 May 1936) is an American marathon runner. Berman won the Boston Marathon as an unofficial winner from 1969 to 1971 as women were not allowed to compete until 1972. At subsequent Boston Marathons, Berman had a fifth-place finish in both 1972 and 1973. Berman's wins were made official by the Boston Athletic Association in 1996. Outside of Boston, Berman finished third at the 1971 New York City Marathon. In 2015, she was inducted into the Road Runners Club of America Hall of Fame. Berman is the daughter of Saul O Sidore and May Blum Sidore Gruber.

== Early life and education ==
Berman was born on 14 May 1936 in The Bronx, New York City. She spent her childhood in New Hampshire and graduated from the Rhode Island School of Design with a Bachelor of Fine Arts in 1958.

== Career ==
=== Running ===
Berman started running during 1961. She expanded to distance running in 1964 at a five-mile road race in Marlborough, Massachusetts. From 1969 to 1971, she won the Boston Marathon while setting a course record in the 1970 Boston Marathon with 3:05:08. In 1971, at the Plodder's Marathon in Brockton, Massachusetts, Berman won and finished just a razor short of a three-hour marathon with 3:00:35. It would be her lifetime best time. Berman held the world record for women's marathon for three months until September 1971, when Elizabeth Bonner broke through the 3-hour barrier and won the New York City Marathon in 2:55. Finally official at the 1972 Boston Marathon, Berman finished fifth in the first sanctioned women's event.

At the following Boston edition, Berman had another fifth-place finish at the 1973 Boston Marathon. Berman did not appear at Boston between 1974 and 1976, and she competed at her final Boston events from 1977 to 1979. Berman's wins from 1969 to 1971 were unofficial as the Boston Marathon was not officially open to women until 1972. In 1996, her Boston Marathon wins were made official by the Boston Athletic Association. Apart from Boston, Berman was also third at the 1971 New York City Marathon. She retired from running in 2000.

=== Skiing ===
Berman joined "[the first] women's cross country team" for the United States during 1968. She remained with the team in 1969. Berman did not receive a spot for the 1972 Winter Olympics.

Outside of marathon running, Berman participates in orienteering, ski-orienteering, roller-skiing and cross-country skiing. Berman and her husband founded the Cambridge Sports Union in 1962 and were publishers of Orienteering North America magazine from 1985 to 1999.

== Achievements ==
Year	Competition	Venue	Position	Event	Notes
Representing United States
1969	Boston Marathon	Boston, Massachusetts, U.S.	1st	Marathon	3:22:46
1970	Boston Marathon	Boston, Massachusetts, U.S.	1st	Marathon	3:05:07
1971	Boston Marathon	Boston, Massachusetts, U.S.	1st	Marathon	3:08:30
1971	New York City Marathon	New York City, New York, U.S.	3rd	Marathon	3:08:46
1972	Boston Marathon	Boston, Massachusetts, U.S.	5th	Marathon	3:48:30
1973	Boston Marathon	Boston, Massachusetts, U.S.	5th	Marathon	3:30:05

== Awards and honors ==
In 2013, Berman was selected alongside Bobbi Gibb as the 2013 Boston Marathon's Grand Marshals. In 2015, Berman was inducted into the Road Runners Club of America Hall of Fame.

== Personal life ==
Berman and her husband, Larry, were married in 1955. Their three children were born in 1958 (Pandora), 1959 (Alexander II) and 1963 (Jonathan). In 2022, Berman reported that the couple were no longer running, but exercised together daily and participated in orienteering, ski-orienteering, roller-skiing and cross-country skiing events.
