= Julius Wakachu =

Tanzanian long-distance runner

Personal information
- Nationality: Tanzanian
- Born: 1 January 1948 (age 78)

Sport
- Sport: Long-distance running
- Event: Marathon

Julius Wakachu (born 1 January 1948) is a Tanzanian long-distance runner. He competed in the marathon at the 1972 Summer Olympics.
