= Georg Olsen =

Danish long-distance runner

Personal information
- Nationality: Danish
- Born: 5 May 1937 (age 89) Copenhagen, Denmark

Sport
- Sport: Long-distance running
- Event: Marathon

Georg Olsen (born 5 May 1937) is a Danish long-distance runner. He competed in the marathon at the 1968 Summer Olympics.
