= Armando González (athlete) =

Uruguayan long-distance runner (born 1940)

Personal information
- Full name: Armando J. González Iguini
- Born: 20 April 1940 (age 86) Montevideo, Uruguay
- Height: 1.72 m (5 ft 8 in)
- Weight: 62 kg (137 lb)

Sport
- Sport: Long-distance running
- Event: Marathon

Armando J. González Iguini (born 20 April 1940) is a Uruguayan long-distance runner. He competed in the marathon at the 1968 Summer Olympics.

== International competitions ==
| Year | Competition | Venue | Position | Event | Notes |
Representing Uruguay
| 1967 | South American Championships | Buenos Aires, Argentina | 1st | Marathon | 2:35:43 |
| 1968 | Olympic Games | Mexico City, Mexico | – | Marathon | DNF |

== Personal bests ==
- Marathon – 2:35:43 (1967)
