= Gabrou Merawi =

Ethiopian long-distance runner (born 1932)

Personal information
- Nationality: Ethiopian
- Born: 11 September 1932 (age 93) Addis Ababa, Ethiopia

Sport
- Sport: Long-distance running
- Event: Marathon

Gabrou Merawi (born 11 September 1932) is an Ethiopian long-distance runner. He competed in the marathon at the 1968 Summer Olympics.
