= Julia Chase-Brand =

American runner & physician (born 1942)

Julia Chase-Brand (born in 1942) is a female runner and physician currently living in New London, Connecticut. Her great-grandfather and grandmother were leaders in the American suffrage movement.

== Biography ==
She was born in Groton, Connecticut in 1942, where she grew up and was raised around four brothers. Her first inspiration to run was distance runner John J. Kelley who lived near her neighborhood.

She studied zoology at Smith College. When she graduated she immediately took a liking to bats, and later appeared on Nickelodeon as "Bat Lady". Julia was also a big part in the discovery that bats are in fact not blind, and just have very poor eyesight. She also helped produce a study about how orangutans and gorillas unconsciously stick out their tongues in matters of social aversion, just as people do.

At the age of 53 in 1996, she became the oldest person to obtain a degree in medicine at the Albert Einstein College of Medicine at Yeshiva University. She practiced child psychiatry and has worked at the Montefiore Hospital, Hackensack University Medical Center, and as of 2012 is medical director of outpatient psychiatry at Lawrence and Memorial Hospital in New London, CT. She contributed the section Effects of Maternal Postpartum Depression on the Infant and Older Siblings to the book Perinatal and postpartum mood disorders: perspectives and treatment guide .

== Running career ==
Julia Chase-Brand's first race was the New England championship in the 880-yard run, held in July 1960, which she won. However, she had to list her hometown as being in Rhode Island because women from Connecticut were not allowed to compete.

When she tried to run in the Manchester Road Race in Connecticut in 1960, which women were not allowed to run at that time, race officials told her that if she ran she would be banned from racing for life. She lobbied to be allowed to race for a year, but without success. In 1961 she did run the race, without permission, but then racing's governing body vowed to ban her from all competition unless she agreed to stay out of "men's" road races. She agreed to stay out. Two other women, Chris McKenzie and Dianne Lechausse, also ran the race, although McKenzie veered off onto the sidewalk before the finish line so as not to get in trouble with racing officials. Julia finished in 33 minutes 40 seconds, which would have given her 128th place, ahead of 10 men, if her time was officially counted. Lechausse finished with a time of 41:12.

In 2011, at age 69, Julia returned to run the Manchester Road Race again, on the 50th anniversary of her historic run. She received a handwritten "thank you" letter from Joan Benoit. At the age of 70, Julia Chase-Brand was featured in an award-winning, brief Dick's Sporting Goods documentary/promotional video Link from her home in New London, CT for her contributions to women's sports.

She was named a Hero of Running by Runner's World in 2012.
