= Lengissa Bedane =

Ethiopian long-distance runner

Personal information
- Nationality: Ethiopian
- Born: 7 December 1949 (age 76)

Sport
- Sport: Long-distance running
- Event: Marathon

Lengissa Bedane (born 7 December 1949) is an Ethiopian long-distance runner. He competed in the marathon at the 1972 Summer Olympics.
