= Fernando Molina =

Argentine long-distance runner

Personal information
- Nationality: Argentine
- Born: 9 April 1938 (age 88)

Sport
- Sport: Long-distance running
- Event: Marathon

Fernando Molina (born 9 April 1938) is an Argentine long-distance runner. He competed in the marathon at the 1972 Summer Olympics.
