= Pablo Garrido =

Mexican long-distance runner (1938–2026)

Pablo Garrido Lugo (22 June 1938 – 28 July 2026) was a Mexican athlete who competed in the late 1960s.

== Biography ==
Pablo Garrido Lugo was born in Jilotepec de Abasolo, State of Mexico, on 22 June 1938.

He finished 26th in the men's marathon at the 1968 Summer Olympics in Mexico City. Garrido also took the Olympic Oath at those same games.

Garrido finished fourth in the 1968 Boston Marathon and second in the 1969 Boston Marathon.

Pablo Garrido died on 28 July 2026, at the age of 88.

== International competitions ==
Year	Competition	Venue	Position	Event	Notes
Representing Mexico
1968	Boston Marathon	Boston, United States	4th	Marathon	2:25:07
1968	Olympic Games	Mexico City, Mexico	26th	Marathon	2:35:47
1969	Boston Marathon	Boston, United States	2nd	Marathon	2:17:30
1969	Central American and Caribbean Championships	Havana, Cuba	1st	Half marathon	1:08:53
1970	Central American and Caribbean Games	Panama City, Panama	8th	Marathon	3:06:03

== Sources ==
- 1968 athletics marathon men's results
- 1968 Men's marathon results (in French)
- IOC 1968 Summer Olympics
- Pablo Garrido's profile at Sports Reference.com
