= József Sütő =

Hungarian long-distance runner

Personal information
- Nationality: Hungarian
- Born: 9 September 1937 (age 88) Makó, Hungary

Sport
- Sport: Long-distance running
- Event: Marathon

József Sütő (born 9 September 1937) is a Hungarian former long-distance runner. He competed in the marathon at the 1964 Summer Olympics and the 1968 Summer Olympics.
