= Harold and Mary Jean Hanson Rare Book Collection =

Coordinates: 29.650614°N 82.341520°W

The Harold and Mary Jean Hanson Rare Book Collection is supported by the Special & Area Studies Collections in the George A. Smathers Libraries at the University of Florida. The collection contains over 58,000 rare books, ranging in date from the 15th century through the present era.

== Collection strengths ==
Subject strengths include New England authors (the Parkman Dexter Howe Collection of literature and related cultural/historical topics for the 17th–19th centuries); classical literature in early printed editions; Restoration literature; 18th century poetry, prose and drama; Irish literature of the 19th and 20th centuries; and selected 20th century British and American poetry and fiction.

== Findability ==
Items in the Rare Books Collection are cataloged both in Dewey Decimal and Library of Congress, and the collection can be searched and browsed through the George A. Smathers Libraries Catalog. The Rare Books Collection contains over 58,000 rare items, consisting primarily of books, manuscripts, and text fragments.

== Accessibility ==
The collection is non-circulating, but items can be accessed by researchers during the regular Special Collections Research Room hours. Researchers are encouraged to telephone, e-mail, or write at least 3 days in advance of their visit. Over 500 items are available online through the University of Florida Digital Collections or the HathiTrust Digital Library.
