= Edgar Friedli =

Swiss long-distance runner (1933–2024)

Personal information
- Nationality: Swiss
- Born: 28 October 1933 Landiswil, Switzerland
- Died: 21 July 2024 (aged 90)

Sport
- Sport: Long-distance running
- Event: Marathon

Edgar Friedli (28 October 1933 – 21 July 2024) was a Swiss long-distance runner. He competed in the marathon at the 1968 Summer Olympics. Friedli died on 21 July 2024, at the age of 90.
