= Mick Molloy (athlete) =

Irish long-distance runner (1938–2023)

Personal information
- Nationality: Irish
- Born: Michael Molloy; 13 March 1938 Oughterard, County Galway, Ireland
- Died: 4 September 2023 (aged 85) Oughterard, County Galway, Ireland

Sport
- Sport: Long-distance running
- Event: Marathon

Michael Molloy (13 March 1938 – 4 September 2023) was an Irish long-distance runner. He competed in the marathon at the 1968 Summer Olympics. Molloy died on 4 September 2023, at the age of 85.
