= Ramón Cabrera (athlete) =

Argentine long-distance runner

Personal information
- Nationality: Argentine
- Born: 30 May 1938
- Died: 17 May 2024 (aged 85)

Sport
- Sport: Long-distance running
- Event: Marathon

Ramón Cabrera (30 May 1938 – 17 May 2024) was an Argentine long-distance runner. He competed in the marathon at the 1972 Summer Olympics.
