= Mary Hanson =

- Occupation: television presenter

Mary Hanson is an American television presenter and host of The Mary Hanson Show. The show, which is broadcast from the Twin Cities in Minnesota, premiered in 1980 and focuses on social and health issues.

== Background ==
Mary graduated from Augustana College in Sioux Falls, South Dakota. The Magna cum laude grad majored in English, sociology and education. She had a full scholarship to graduate school and obtained her Master's in Social Work from the University of Minnesota.

She worked for a two years as a social worker at Children's Home Society in St.Paul, Minnesota, and then began her work as a consultant in social services. Hanson has worked in radio and television since 1978 when she began producing and hosting a radio show she created after hearing “an excellent speaker who deserved a larger audience.” This program, on KCHK AM, evolved into The Mary Hanson Show.

In October 1991, Mary married Ron Daws, a former 1968 Olympic marathon runner.

== The Mary Hanson Show ==
The Mary Hanson Show is the longest running cable program in the United States, having been on the air regularly since 1980. The weekly show has also been on public television's KTCI for the past thirteen years for a season each year. The show focuses on health and social issues and has provided a forum for area and national experts and leaders. Host and producer Mary Hanson views her role as a conduit between guest and viewer, and the result is in-depth discussions of contemporary issues.

The Mary Hanson Show has won recognition at the local, state and national level. Some of the awards it has received include:

- Minnesota Medical Association Media Award for Excellence in Medical Journalism (3 years)
- Minnesota Psychiatrists Society's award for Excellence in the Media
- Lifetime Achievement Award, Minneapolis Telecommunications Network
- C.A.R.E. Award, Mental Health Association in Hennepin County (given annually to one individual recognized for efforts in promoting mental health in the Twin Cities community)
- Metropolitan Community Churches first annual Ivy Award for "Making the Community a Better Place"
- Minnesota Education Association School Bell Award for Best In-depth Television Program
- Best Talk Show, Minneapolis Television Network
- Teddy Award for Excellence, Rogers Cable systems
- National Federation of Local Cable Programmers competition finalist
- Minnesota State Cable Communications Board Award for Excellence
- Minnesota Council on Health Certificate of Achievement

Some notable guests who have appeared on the program are:

- Elmer L. Andersen and Arne Carlson, former Governor of Minnesota
- Kathy Halbreich, Director, Walker Art Center
- William W. George, former Chairman and CEO of Medtronic, Inc.
- Bob Bruinicks, President, University of Minnesota
- Ken Pentel, American politician, Green Party gubernatorial candidate

== Other television work ==
Mary's past television work includes hosting a weekly live hour-long children's TV show, The Wishing Well, done for thirteen years in conjunction with Abbott Northwestern Hospital and Minneapolis Children's Health Center. She was also the co-producer and co-host of Minnesota Screening Room, a movie preview show which was on Rogers Cable public access from 1983 to 1990; the co-producer and host of Fox Broadcasting's public affairs show, Talk About With Mary Hanson, from 1990 to 1992; and the co-producer and host of Portrait, an in-depth personality profile cable program. This project led to her current annual public television series, Minnesota Leaders
