= Pat McMahon (athlete) =

Irish long-distance runner

Personal information
- Nationality: Irish
- Born: 1 February 1942 (age 84) Liscannor, Ireland

Sport
- Sport: Long-distance running
- Event: Marathon

Pat McMahon (born 1 February 1942) is an Irish former long-distance runner. He competed in the marathon at the 1968 Summer Olympics.

== Career ==
McMahon ran collegiately for Oklahoma Baptist University, winning the 1965 and 1966 NAIA Men's Cross Country Championship individual titles and setting a record time of 19:53.6 in 1966. McMahon won the NAIA 3,000 meter steeplechase championship in 1967. McMahon finished second in the 1971 Boston Marathon, just five seconds behind winner Álvaro Mejía.

McMahon was inducted into the Oklahoma Baptist University Hall of Fame in 1976.
