= John J. Kelley =

American marathon runner (1930–2011)

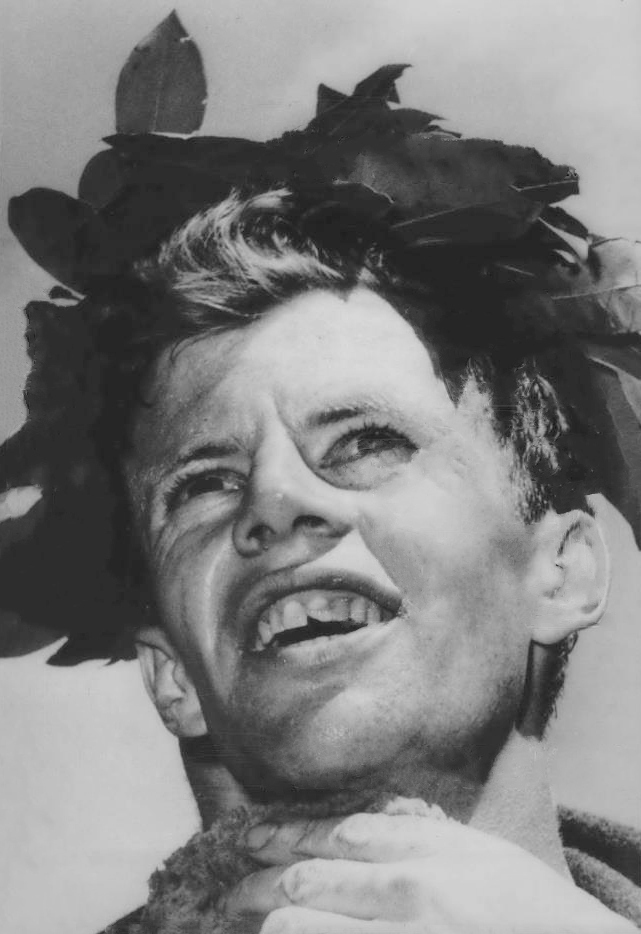
- Kelley in 1959

Personal information
- Full name: John Joseph Kelley
- Nickname: Kelley the Younger
- Born: December 24, 1930 Norwich, Connecticut, U.S.
- Died: August 21, 2011 (aged 80) North Stonington, Connecticut, U.S.
- Height: 167 cm (5 ft 6 in)
- Weight: 57 kg (126 lb)

Sport
- Sport: Athletics
- Event: 5000 m – marathon
- Club: Boston Athletic Association

Achievements and titles
- Personal bests: 5000 m – 15:34.8 (1953); 10000 m – 31:11.4 (1957); Mar – 2:20:05 (1957)
Medal record
Representing the United States
Pan American Games
| Gold medal – first place | 1959 Chicago | Marathon |

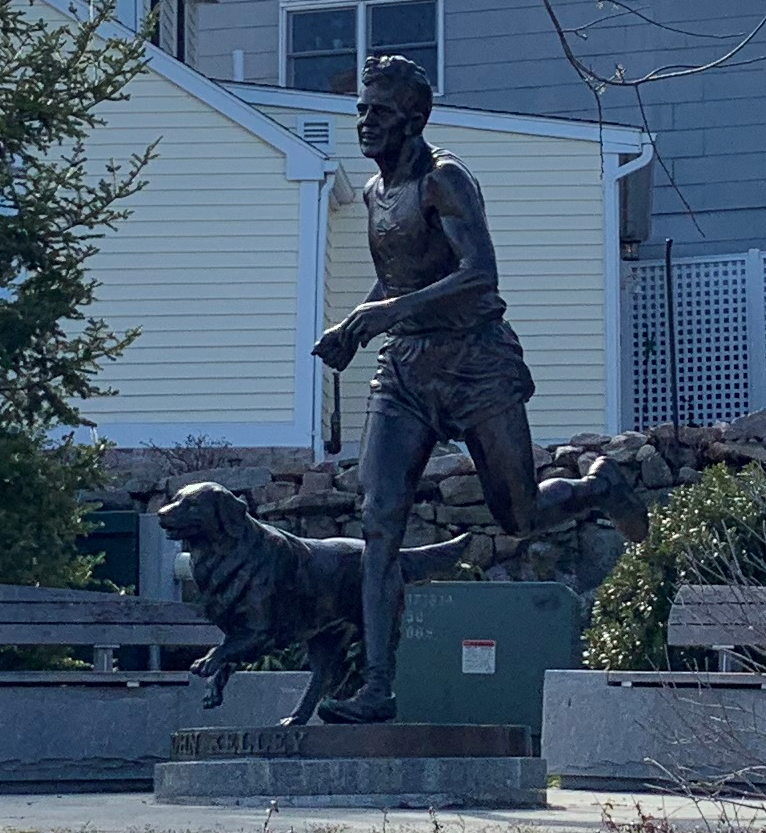
Statue of John J. Kelley and his dog Brutus in Mystic, Connecticut

John Joseph Kelley (December 24, 1930 – August 21, 2011) was an American long-distance runner who won the 1957 Boston Marathon and the marathon at the 1959 Pan American Games. He was also a member of the United States Olympic teams of 1956 and 1960, competing in the marathon. He was often dubbed "Kelley the Younger" to avoid confusion with Johnny Kelley (1907–2004; "Kelley the Elder"), winner of the 1935 and 1945 Boston Marathons; the two men were not related.

== Career summary ==
Kelley was born in Norwich, Connecticut. He began racing in marathons during his college years. From 1950 to 1954, he attended Boston University, located about a mile from the Boston Marathon finish line. While there, he excelled in team races and would run his first two Boston Marathons, in 1953 and 1954. He finished fifth in the 1953 race before following up with a 7th-place finish the next year. After graduating, he finished 2nd in the 1956 Boston Marathon and made his way onto the U.S. Olympic Marathon team which competed in Melbourne, Australia during the same year. He would go on to win the Boston Marathon outright in 1957 while setting a new course record on the remeasured course.

After his win at Boston, Kelley would win several other marathons, including eight consecutive wins of the Yonkers Marathon in Yonkers, New York. During all those years, the Yonkers Marathon served as the National Championship. As a result of his record setting performance at Yonkers in 1960, he again found his way onto the U.S. Olympic Marathon team and competed in the 1960 Olympics in Rome. He placed 21st and 19th in the Melbourne and Rome Olympic marathons, respectively.

== Boston Marathon results ==
- 1953 2:28:19 5th
- 1954 2:28:51 7th
- 1956 2:14:33 2nd
- 1957 2:20:05 1st
- 1958 2:30:51 2nd
- 1959 2:23:43 2nd
- 1960 DNF
- 1961 2:23:54 2nd
- 1962 2:28:37 4th
- 1963 2:21:09 2nd
- 1964 2:27:23 7th
- 1965 2:25:23 14th
- 1967 2:25:25 12th
- 1968 2:37:03 15th
- 1969 2:31:36 22nd
- 1970 2:36:50 63rd
- 1971 2:44:10 96th
- 1972 2:40:05 79th
- 1973 2:41:13 66th
- 1974 2:32:18 78th
- 1975 2:34:11 169th
- 1976 2:46:43 154th
- 1977 2:46:26 353rd
- 1980 2:55:45
- 1982 2:55:50
- 1983 2:55:30
- 1984 2:58:35
- 1986 3:01:40
- 1987 3:08:46
- 1988 3:28:53
- 1989 3:46:50
- 1992 4:07:32

== Other milestones ==
Kelley is a runner to ever win both the Boston Marathon and the Mount Washington Road Race, which he won in 1961. Another runner, Jacqueline Gareau, has also won both. He made the ascent in one hour and 8 minutes 54 seconds, nearly seven minutes faster than the winning times in the three previous years the race had been held, 1936–1938. In September 2014, a larger-than-life sized bronze statue of Kelley and his dog (Brutus) was dedicated in downtown Mystic, Connecticut.

== Later years ==
After his career as a runner ended, he went on to a successful career as high school running coach. At Fitch High School in Groton, Connecticut, Kelley coached Amby Burfoot, winner of the 1968 Boston Marathon, and Julia Chase, the first woman to successfully challenge the gender barrier of the Amateur Athletic Union. He coached American Power-lifting Champion and world record holder Christopher Annino. In addition to coaching, he found work over the years as a newspaper columnist, freelance writer, cab driver and Kelley's Pace running wear store co-owner.

== Personal life ==
Kelley married Jacinta C. Braga in 1953, and together they had three children, Julia, Kathleen, and Eileen.

== Death ==
Kelley died in North Stonington, Connecticut at the age of 80 on August 21, 2011.

== See also ==
- List of winners of the Boston Marathon
