= Walter Van Renterghem =

Belgian long-distance runner

Personal information
- Nationality: Belgian
- Born: 26 March 1944 (age 82) Poperinge, Belgium

Sport
- Sport: Long-distance running
- Event: Marathon

Walter Van Renterghem (born 26 March 1944) is a Belgian long-distance runner. He competed in the marathon at the 1972 Summer Olympics.
