= Álvaro Mejía (runner) =

Colombian long-distance runner (1940–2021)

- Mejía at the finish of the 1971 Boston Marathon

Personal information
- Born: 15 May 1940 Medellín, Antioquia, Colombia
- Died: 12 January 2021 (aged 80) Bogotá, Colombia
Medal record
Men's athletics
Representing Colombia
Pan American Games
| Bronze medal – third place | 1971 Cali | 10,000 m |
Central American and Caribbean Games
| Gold medal – first place | 1962 Kingston | 1,500 metres |
| Gold medal – first place | 1966 San Juan | 1,500 metres |
| Gold medal – first place | 1966 San Juan | 5,000 metres |
| Gold medal – first place | 1966 San Juan | 10,000 metres |
Bolivarian Games
| Gold medal – first place | 1965 Quito | 1500 m |
| Gold medal – first place | 1965 Quito | 5000 m |
| Gold medal – first place | 1965 Quito | 10,000 m |
| Silver medal – second place | 1961 Barranquilla | 800 m |
| Silver medal – second place | 1961 Barranquilla | 1500 m |

Álvaro Mejía Florez (15 May 1940 – 12 January 2021) was a long-distance runner from Colombia, who became a national hero after competing in the 5,000 meter race at the 1964 Tokyo Olympic Games.

Mejía competed in the 1968 Mexico City Olympics in the 10,000 meters, where he placed tenth, and in the 1972 Munich Olympics, where he ran the marathon. Mejía won the Saint Silvester Road Race in 1966, the 1971 Boston Marathon, and a bronze medal at the 1971 Pan American Games in the 10,000 meter race.

== 1971 Boston Marathon winner ==
The 1971 Boston Marathon, the 75th edition of the event, had one of the closest finishes ever, as Mejía dueled almost the entire way with Pat McMahon, a native of Ireland and local Massachusetts resident. Mejía finally pulled away from McMahon less than 150 yards from the finish, clocking 2:18:45, just five seconds ahead of McMahon. Mejía was the first Boston Marathon winner from South America.

== Coming to America ==
Mejía was married to Terri Stickles, the American bronze medalist in the 400 meter freestyle swim in the 1964 Tokyo Olympic Games. Stickles brought Mejía to the San Francisco Bay Area in 1969. They met in Cali, Colombia, where Terri was a Peace Corps volunteer.

From 1969 until 1985, Mejía dispensed running advice along with running shoes and apparel at a sporting goods store ("Olympic Sports") he owned with Stickles in San Mateo, California. During the 1970s, he competed as a member of the local West Valley Track Club (WVTC), at a time when the club often dominated team competition in Northern California. Several Colombian runners followed Mejía to train in Northern California and compete alongside Mejia for WVTC, including Víctor Mora, who placed second in the 1972 Boston Marathon.

== International competitions ==
| Year | Competition | Venue | Position | Event | Notes |
Representing Colombia
| 1961 | South American Championships | Lima, Peru | 7th | 800 m | NT |
| 1961 | South American Championships | Lima, Peru | ? | 1500 m | 3:57.6 |
| 1961 | Bolivarian Games | Barranquilla, Colombia | 2nd | 800 m | 1:55.5 |
| 1961 | Bolivarian Games | Barranquilla, Colombia | 2nd | 1500 m | 4:02.7 |
| 1962 | Central American and Caribbean Games | Kingston, Jamaica | 1st | 1500 m | 3:51.4 |
| 1963 | South American Championships | Cali, Colombia | 1st | 1500 m | 3:53.5 |
| 1964 | Olympic Games | Tokyo, Japan | 48th (h) | 5000 m | 14:41.4 |
| 1965 | Bolivarian Games | Quito, Ecuador | 1st | 1500 m | 3:57.2 A |
| 1965 | Bolivarian Games | Quito, Ecuador | 1st | 5000 m | 15:00.9 A |
| 1965 | Bolivarian Games | Quito, Ecuador | 1st | 10,000 m | 32:22.5 A |
| 1966 | Central American and Caribbean Games | San Juan, Puerto Rico | 1st | 1500 m | 3:50.3 |
| 1966 | Central American and Caribbean Games | San Juan, Puerto Rico | 1st | 5000 m | 14:42.6 |
| 1966 | Central American and Caribbean Games | San Juan, Puerto Rico | 1st | 10,000 m | 31:34.0 |
| 1968 | Olympic Games | Mexico City, Mexico | 10th | 10,000 m | 30:10.6 |
| 1971 | Boston Marathon | Boston, United States | 1st | Marathon | 2:18:45 |
| 1971 | Pan American Games | Cali, Colombia | 3rd | 10,000 m | 29:06.93 |
| 1971 | Pan American Games | Cali, Colombia | 4th | Marathon | 2:27:59 |
| 1972 | Olympic Games | Munich, West Germany | 48th | Marathon | 2:31:56 |

== Coaching ==
Mejía coached Colombian athletes including Alirio Carrasco, of Bogotá, who ran 2:12:09 at the Chicago Marathon in 2003, and Olympian William Roldán.

== Death ==
Mejía died in Bogotá on 12 January 2021 at the age of 80.
