= Ian Thompson (runner) =

English long-distance runner

Personal information
- Nationality: British (English)
- Born: 16 October 1949 (age 76) Birkenhead, England
- Height: 167 cm (5 ft 6 in)
- Weight: 60 kg (132 lb)

Sport
- Sport: Athletics
- Event: Marathon
- Club: Luton United Athletic Club
Medal record
Men's athletics
Representing Great Britain
European Championships
Gold medal – first place	1974 Rome	Marathon
Representing England
Commonwealth Games
Gold medal – first place	1974 Christchurch	Marathon

Ian Reginald Thompson (born 16 October 1949) is an English former long-distance runner, who gained success in marathon running. His Commonwealth Games marathon record set in 1974 remains unbeaten. He also appeared at the 1980 Summer Olympics.

== Early career ==
Born in the town of Birkenhead, Cheshire (now Merseyside), Ian Thompson's family moved to Luton, where he ran for his school, Luton Grammar School. Thompson was regarded as just an ordinary club athlete and ranked 90th in Britain's 5,000 metres list at the time, but suddenly broke through to world class as a marathon runner when asked to make up the numbers for his club, Luton United, in the Amateur Athletic Association of England (AAA) 1973 AAA Championships on 27 October 1973. He won in a time of 2:12:40, at the time, the fastest ever debut at the distance and becoming the British marathon champion, which qualified him for the Commonwealth Games three months later.

== Commonwealth and European gold ==
Thompson travelled to Christchurch for the 1974 British Commonwealth Games with little expectation that he would be able to reproduce the performance that got him there. This was not the case however and he won with a margin of over 2 minutes in a time of 2:09:12, the fastest ever run in a championship race, a British record and only 39 seconds off the then world record of 2:08:34. (Note: The International Association of Athletics Federations has published a progression of road racing world bests and records that were widely recognised prior to ratification and official acceptance by the IAAF. According to that progression, Derek Clayton's 2:08:34 performance in Antwerp on 30 May 1969 was a world best at the time. Other road racing authorities, including the Association of Road Racing Statisticians, consider Clayton's performance to have occurred on a short course and recognise other athletes – including Thompson – in the progression for world best in the marathon.) This is currently (19 September 2020) the eighth fastest time by a British athlete (according to runbritainrankings.com) and still a Commonwealth Games record. In the early autumn of 1974, Thompson competed at the European Championships in Rome, again he proved to be the class act of the field. He stayed with the leading group until the 20 kilometre mark and then steadily opening up a gap on the rest of the field that stood at 98 seconds when he won in a time of 2:13:18.8.

Thompson's achievements were recognised in the 1974 SJA Annual Sports awards, where he was runner up to John Conteh in the Sportsmen of the Year category.

== Olympics ==
In 1976, he suffered cramps and finished only seventh in the trials for the Olympics, for which he was not selected. Although for many years among Britain's best, he never regained his 1974 eminence and contested only one more major championship. He won his second AAA title at the 1980 AAA Championships to gain selection for the Moscow Olympics but dropped out of the race during the Games on 1 August. His best times each year between 1977 and 1982 were in the 2:12 to 2:15 range.

== Personal life ==
His wife Margaret (née Tunstall) was an early pioneer of marathon running for women in Britain and ran a British best time of 3:07:47 in Korso, Finland, on 26 October 1975 and for a few months they held both the men and women's British marathon records, until Margaret's time was beaten by Christine Readdy (Kilkenny) in Feltham on 4 April 1976. Margaret trained at Bedford College of Physical Education. At the time of his victory at the Commonwealth Games Thompson was studying for a PGCE at Trinity and All Saints College (TASC).

Thompson was famously quoted at his 1974 peak as saying "I prefer to remain in blissful ignorance of the opposition. That way I'm not frightened by anyone's reputation".

== Personal bests ==
Event	Time	Date	Location
Marathon	2:09:12	31 January 1974	Christchurch
25,000 m	1:17:36.4	15 May 1975	Oulu
15,000 m	44:56.0	15 May 1975	Oulu
10,000 m	29:33.0	1979	
5,000 m	14:05.4	19 June 1971	Cardiff
1,500 m	3:51.0	1969	
One hour	19.831 km	15 May 1975	Oulu

== Competitions ==
Event	Time	Date	Location	Result
AAA Marathon	2:12:40	27 October 1973	Harlow	1st
Orion Harriers Fifteen	1:24:14	24 March 1973	Epping Forest	2nd
Commonwealth Games Marathon	2:09:12	31 January 1974	Christchurch	1st
Athens Marathon	2:13:50.2	6 April 1974	Athens	1st
European Championships Marathon	2:13:18.8	8 September 1974	Rome	1st
Fukuoka Marathon	2:12:54	5 December 1976	Fukuoka	2nd
Amsterdam Marathon	2:17:47.4	21 May 1977	Amsterdam	4th
Polytechnic Marathon	2:14:32	11 June 1977	Windsor	1st
New York City Marathon	2:17:46.0	23 October 1977	New York	13th
Auckland Marathon	2:03:31	13 November 1977	Auckland	3rd
Auckland Marathon	2:13:49	12 November 1978	Auckland	1st
New York City Marathon	2:14:12	22 October 1978	New York	2nd
Montreal Marathon	2:15:24	26 August 1979	Montreal	6th
New York City Marathon	2:13:43	21 October 1979	New York	4th
AAA Marathon	2:14:00	3 May 1980	Milton Keynes	1st
London to Brighton Race	5:15:15	28 September 1980	London	1st
Stockholm Marathon	2:19:25	23 August 1980	Stockholm	3rd
Tokyo Marathon	2:14:39	1 March 1981	Tokyo	7th
Duchy Marathon	2:27:53	29 March 1981	Cornwall	1st
Amatrice-Configno 8.4 km	24:45.8	18 August 1981	Amatrice	1st
Birmingham Marathon	2:13:50	20 September 1981	Birmingham	1st
Romatona Marathon (short course)	2:12:09	14 March 1982	Rome	2nd
Geneva Marathon	2:15:28	21 March 1982	Geneva	2nd
Paris Marathon	2:14:07	16 May 1982	Paris	1st
Intercontinental Istanbul Eurasia Marathon	2:32:35	November 1983	Istanbul	1st
Paris Marathon	2:17:14	14 May 1983	Paris	3rd
Stoke-on-Trent City Marathon	2:20:54	17 June 1984	Stoke-on-Trent	1st
Manchester Marathon	2:16:08	1 July 1984	Manchester	1st
Guernsey Marathon	2:25:22	25 August 1986	Saint Peter Port	2nd
Malta Marathon	2:29:06	15 February 1987	Malta	1st

Source:Association of Road Racing Statisticians (ARRS)
