= Valentine Friedli =

Swiss politician (1929–2016)

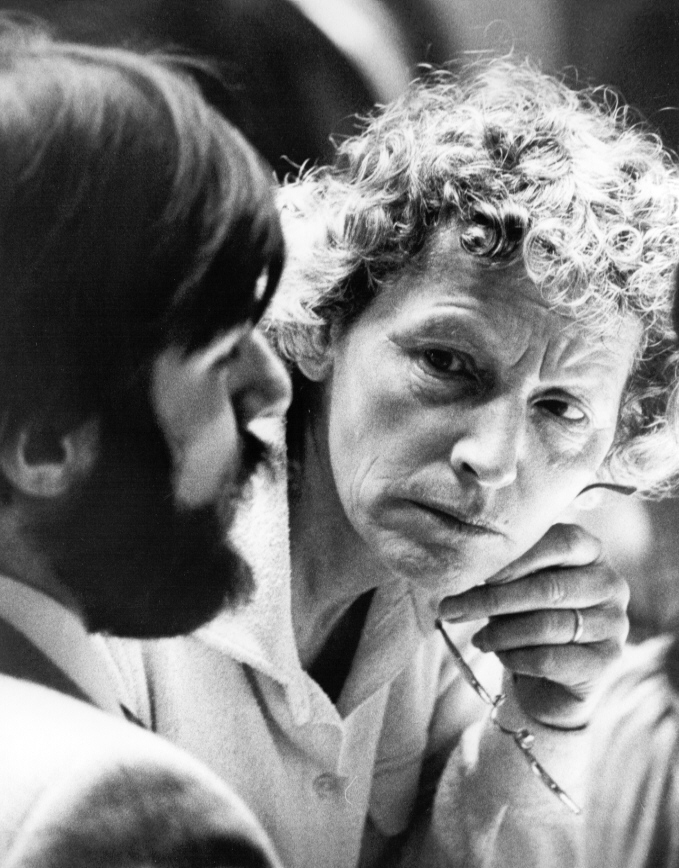
Friedli in 1986

Valentine Friedli (6 April 1929 – 10 July 2016, née Graessli) was a Swiss politician from the Jura.

== Early life and education ==
Valentine Graessli was born on 6 April 1929 in Saint-Aubin-Sauges in Neuchâtel canton, and attended secondary school in Delémont. She took a commercial apprenticeship and worked as an executive secretary. She married Francis Friedl in 1951 and they had seven children.

== Political career ==
Friedli campaigned for the rights of women and for the autonomy of the Jura. From 1963 she was involved with l'Association féminine pour la défense du Jura. In 1976 she was the only female member of the Assemblée constituante jurassienne, the body drawing up the constitution of the newly created Republic and Canton of Jura, and ensured that the equality of men and women was included in the constitution. She particularly brought to life "Bureau de la condition féminine" led by Marie-Josèphe Lachat and the "Office d´orientation professionel" M. Gilabert. She was a member of the Parliament of Jura from 1979 to 1983 and of the National Council of Switzerland from 1983 to 1987, representing the Social Democratic Party of Switzerland - in temporary alliance with Christian-Social Party.

== Death and commemoration ==
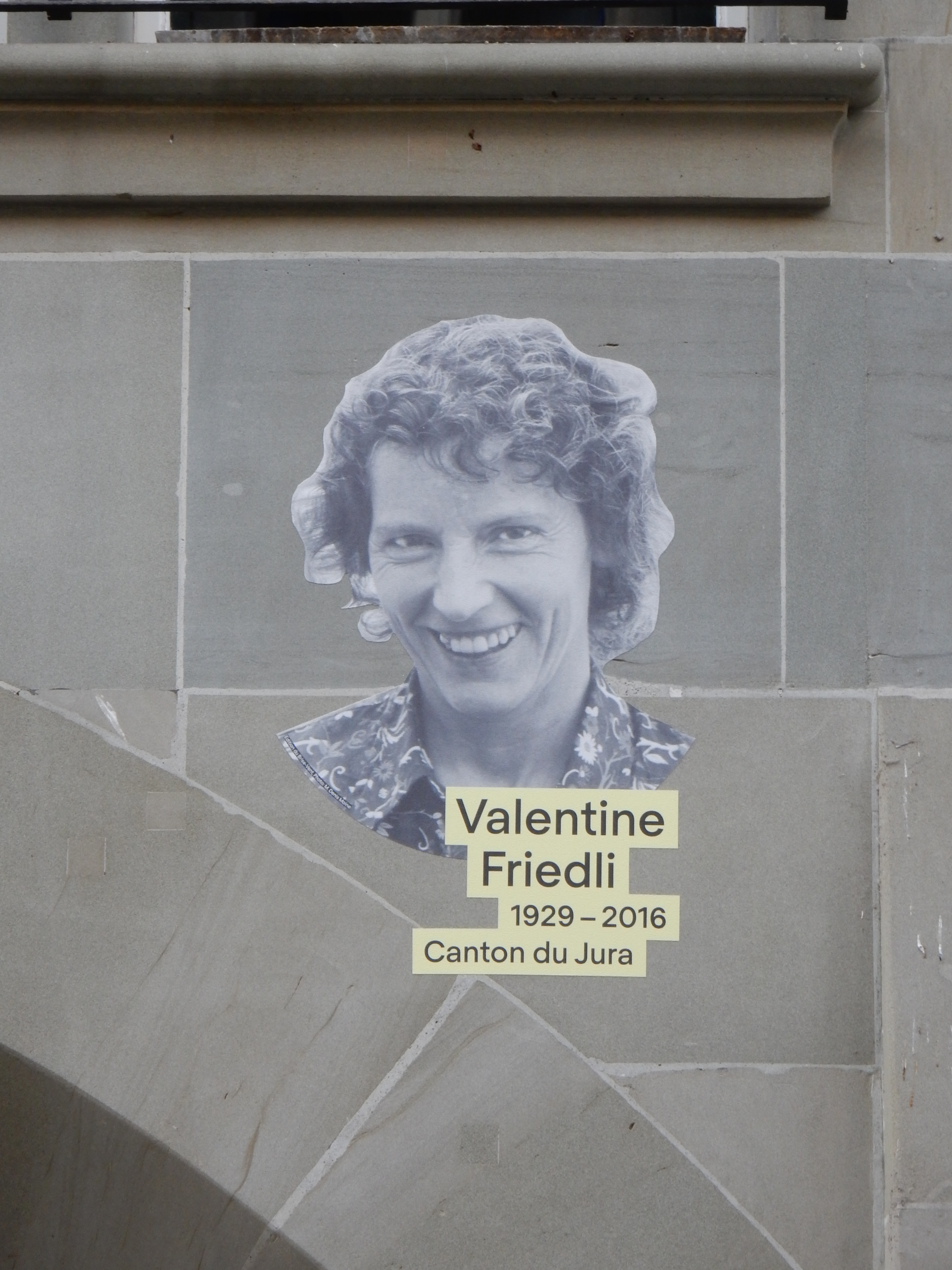
A portrait of Friedli displayed in Bern in 2021 as part of the celebrations of the 50th anniversary of Swiss female suffrage

Friedli died on 10 July 2016 at Delémont. She is commemomorated in the name of a square in the town, Place Valentine-Friedli. The naming ceremony was held on what would have been her 90th birthday, 6 April 2029.
