= Ricardo Condori =

Bolivian long-distance runner

Personal information
- Nationality: Bolivian
- Born: 7 February 1950 (age 76)

Sport
- Sport: Long-distance running
- Event: Marathon

Ricardo Condori (born 1 February 1949) is a Bolivian long-distance runner. He competed in the marathon at the 1972 Summer Olympics. An Aymara Indian, Condori also represented Bolivia at the 1975 Pan American Games. Condori now lives in Boardman, Ohio.
