= Kim Chang-son (athlete) =

North Korean runner (born 1952)

Personal information
- Nationality: North Korean
- Born: 11 April 1952 (age 73)

Sport
- Sport: Long-distance running
- Event: Marathon

Kim Chang-son (born 11 April 1952) is a North Korean long-distance runner. He competed in the marathon at the 1972 Summer Olympics and the 1976 Summer Olympics.
