= Demissie Wolde =

Ethiopian marathon runner (born 1937)

Demissie Wolde (born 8 March 1937) is an Ethiopian former marathon runner. He won the Košice Peace Marathon in 1969 in 2:15:37. He also competed in the 1964 Olympic marathon, having qualified by running 2:19:30 on 3 August for the third place, in the Ethiopian Olympic trials, a race held at 8,000 feet. After being among the leaders for much of the 1964 Olympic race, he finished tenth in 2:21:25.2. At the 1972 Summer Olympics, he placed 18th in 2:20:44.0 in the marathon. He is the younger brother of Mamo Wolde who dropped out of the race in 1964, won the Olympic Marathon in 1968, and who finished third in 1972.
