= Yoshiaki Unetani =

Japanese long-distance runner (1944–2022)

Yoshiaki Unetani (采谷 義秋; 6 October 1944 – 5 November 2022) was a Japanese long-distance runner. Unusually for an elite athlete, he combined training with his job as a high school teacher at Takehara Senior High School.

Unetani had a personal best for the marathon of 2.12:12 which he set in the Fukuoka Marathon in 1970. He competed in the marathon at the 1972 Summer Olympics in Munich, placing 36th. He secured his place at Munich by finishing third in the Lake Biwa Marathon, a race he had won the previous year. He is most well known for winning the 1969 Boston Marathon in a time of 2.13:49.

Unetani died from pneumonia in Wu City, Hiroshima Prefecture, on 5 November 2022, at the age of 78.
