= Akio Usami =

Japanese long-distance runner (1943–2026)

Personal information
- Nationality: Japanese
- Born: 31 May 1943 Tsubame, Niigata, Japan
- Died: 26 October 2026 (aged 83)
- Height: 168 cm (5 ft 6 in)
- Weight: 59 kg (130 lb)

Sport
- Sport: Athletics
- Event: Long-distance running/Marathon

Akio Usami (宇佐美 彰朗, Usami Akio; 31 May 1943 – 26 October 2026) was a Japanese long-distance runner. He competed in the marathon at the 1968, 1972 and the 1976 Summer Olympics.

His most important win in his marathoning career occurred at the prestigious 1970 Fukuoka Marathon, in which he ran a personal best 2:10:37.8 (also setting a Japanese record at the time). He beat runner-up Kenny Moore by nearly a minute.

Usami won the British AAA Championships title at the 1974 AAA Championships.

Usami died on 26 October 2026, at the age of 83.
