= José García (runner) =

Mexican long-distance runner

Personal information
- Born: 20 March 1946 (age 80) Mexico City, Mexico
- Died: 25 April 2023

Sport
- Sport: Long-distance running
- Event: Marathon

José García Gaspar (born 20 March 1946) is a Mexican long-distance runner. He competed in the marathon at the 1968 Summer Olympics.
