= Amby Burfoot =

American marathoner (born 1946)

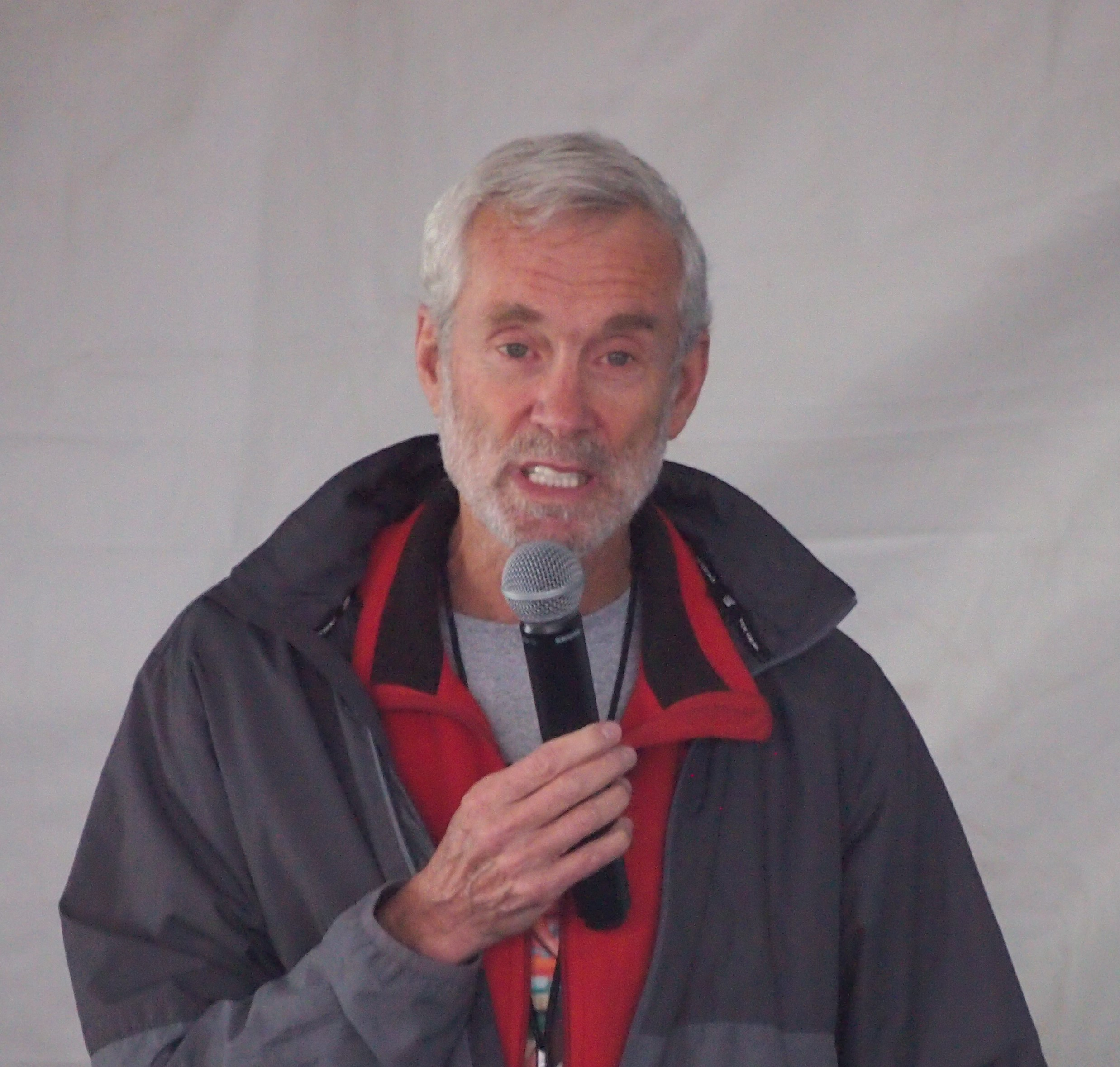
- Burfoot in 2016
- Born: August 19, 1946 (age 80); Charlottesville, Virginia, U.S.
- Education: Wesleyan University
- Occupations: Runner, writer
- Known for: Winner of the 1968 Boston Marathon

Ambrose Joel Burfoot (born August 19, 1946) is an American former marathoner whose peak competitive years came in the late 1960s and early 1970s. He was the winner of the 1968 Boston Marathon. After retiring from competition, he became a running journalist and author. Burfoot was editor-in-chief at Runner's World for many years. He currently serves as the editor-at-large for Marathon Handbook.

== Competition ==
Amby Burfoot grew up in Groton, Connecticut, where he started running at Fitch Senior High School. He encountered Rudyard Kipling's "If—": "The poem's most famous line stopped me cold. It seemed a life lesson, something I should adopt as my personal mantra. And I did."

Burfoot competed for the Wesleyan Cardinals track and field team in the NCAA. In his senior year at Wesleyan University, where Burfoot was the roommate and teammate of Bill Rodgers, Burfoot won the Boston Marathon. An injury caused by running a steeplechase race in a collegiate track meet later that spring prevented Burfoot from being fully prepared for that year's Olympic Trials marathon.

Burfoot's influence on Rodgers, who went on to win the Boston Marathon four times, provided a link in a four-athlete Boston tradition starting with John A. Kelley ("Kelley the Elder") and continuing through Kelley the Younger, Burfoot, and Rodgers.

In the Fukuoka Marathon in Japan in December 1968, Burfoot ran a personal best time of 2:14:28.8, which was one second from the American marathon record at the time.

At its peak, Burfoot's training often included high mileage weeks of 100–140 miles (160–230 km) done at a relatively slow pace.

As of 2015, he had run the Manchester Road Race 53 times in a row besting the streak of barefoot runner, Charlie "Doc" Robbins. In the process, he won Manchester nine times. Burfoot also continues to run the Boston Marathon at five-year intervals, marking his 1968 win. He ran the 2013 Boston Marathon but was stopped three-quarters of a mile from completion after a terrorist attack near the finish line. Each year since returning for 2014, Burfoot has run "the most glorious marathon ever because of the great people of Boston."

=== Achievements ===
- All results regarding marathon, unless stated otherwise

Year	Competition	Venue	Position	Notes
Representing the United States
1966	Philadelphia Marathon	Philadelphia, United States	1st	2:24:43
1968	Boston Marathon	Boston, United States	1st	2:22:17

== Journalism ==
In 1978, Burfoot joined Bob Anderson as East Coast editor for Anderson's publication, Runner's World magazine.

In 1984, he covered the first Olympic marathon that women were allowed to participate in, when Joan Benoit Samuelson came into the Olympic Stadium ahead of the field and surprised media to win gold.

In 1985, when Runner's World was bought by Rodale, Inc. they moved from Mountain View, California to Emmaus, Pennsylvania, he was named the executive editor.

In 1992, Runner's World published Burfoot's article, "White Men Can't Run," about the dominance of African athletes and athletes of African descent in professional athletics. The article was later republished in The Best American Sports Writing.

Burfoot authored the popular Run Long Run Healthy newsletter until January 2025 when he passed it over to Brady Holmer.

== Personal life ==
As of 2018, Burfoot stated he was running 15 to 20 miles (24 to 32 km) a week, whilst in his prime was running 110 miles (180 km) a week. He described his diet as built around fish, fruit, salads, oatmeal, nuts, protein shakes and 6–8 eggs most weeks with the occasional hamburger.

== Selected publications ==
- Burfoot, Amby, Runner's World Complete Book of Running (1999) Rodale, ISBN 1-57954-186-0
- Burfoot, Amby, The Principles of Running: Practical Lessons from My First 100,000 Miles (1999) Rodale Press; 1ST edition ISBN 1-57954-038-4; New Ed edition (2003) ISBN 1-57954-741-9
- Burfoot, Amby, The Runner's Guide to the Meaning of Life: What 35 Years of Running Has Taught Me About Winning, Losing, Happiness, Humility, and the Human Heart (2000) Rodale Press; 1ST edition ISBN 1-57954-263-8
- Burfoot, Amby, Runner's World Complete Book of Beginning Running (2005) Rodale Press, ISBN 1-59486-022-X
- Burfoot, Amby, First Ladies of Running: 22 Inspiring Profiles of the Rebels, Rulebreakers, and Visionaries Who Changed the Sport Forever (2016) Rodale Books, ISBN 1-60961-564-6
- Burfoot, Amby, Run forever: Your Complete Guide to Healthy Lifetime Running (2018) Arena Sport, ISBN 1-90971-560-3

== See also ==
- List of winners of the Boston Marathon
