= Athletics at the 1970 British Commonwealth Games – Men's marathon =

Men's marathon at the 1970 British Commonwealth Games
- Venue: Edinburgh
- Dates: 25 July 1970

Medalists
gold medal	Ron Hill	England
silver medal	Jim Alder	Scotland
bronze medal	Don Faircloth	England

The men's marathon event at the 1970 British Commonwealth Games was held on 25 July in Edinburgh, Scotland.

== Results ==
Final results
Rank	Name	Nationality	Time	Notes
1st place, gold medalist(s)	Ron Hill	England	2:09:28	
2nd place, silver medalist(s)	Jim Alder	Scotland	2:12:04	
3rd place, bronze medalist(s)	Don Faircloth	England	2:12:19	
4	Jack Foster	New Zealand	2:14:44	
5	John Stephen Akhwari	Tanzania	2:15:05	
6	Bill Adcocks	England	2:15:10	
7	Alister Murray	Scotland	2:15:32	
8	Donald MacGregor	Scotland	2:16:53	
9	Michael Teer	Northern Ireland	2:17:24	
10	Andrew Boychuk	Canada	2:18:45	
11	Michael Rowland	Wales	2:19:08	
12	Cyril Leigh	Wales	2:19:53	
13	Martin Cranny	Northern Ireland	2:20:23	
14	Robert Moore	Canada	2:20:47	
15	Philip Ndoo	Kenya	2:22:40	
16	Harnek Singh	India	2:23:12	
17	Dai Davies	Wales	2:23:29	
18	Jeff Julian	New Zealand	2:24:03	
19	Dhavamrai Biredar	India	2:29:18	
20	Douglas Zinkala	Zambia	2:30:02	
21	Fulgenge Rwabu	Uganda	2:34:15	
22	Kenneth Grant	Gibraltar	2:35:55	
23	Reuben Dlamini	Swaziland	2:49:33	
24	Sergio Acecio	Gibraltar	2:50:39	
	Derek Clayton	Australia	DNF	
	Jerome Drayton	Canada	DNF	
	Anthony Parody	Gibraltar	DNF	
	Harry Prowell	Guyana	DNF	
	Jagbir Singh	India	DNF	
	Daniel Kalusa	Zambia	DNF	
	Allieu Massaquoi	Sierra Leone	DNS	
	Richard Mabuza	Swaziland	DNS	
