= Athletics at the 1970 British Commonwealth Games – Men's 10,000 metres =

Men's 10,000 metres at the 1970 British Commonwealth Games
- Venue: Meadowbank Stadium, Edinburgh
- Dates: 20 July 1970

Medalists
gold medal	Lachie Stewart	Scotland
silver medal	Ron Clarke	Australia
bronze medal	Dick Taylor	England

The men's 10,000 metres event at the 1970 British Commonwealth Games was held on 20 July at the Meadowbank Stadium in Edinburgh, Scotland. It was the first time that the metric distance was contested at the Games, replacing the 6 miles.

== Results ==
Final results
Rank	Name	Nationality	Time	Notes
1st place, gold medalist(s)	Lachie Stewart	Scotland	28:11.72	
2nd place, silver medalist(s)	Ron Clarke	Australia	28:13.45	
3rd place, bronze medalist(s)	Dick Taylor	England	28:15.35	
4	Roger Matthews	England	28:21.4	
5	John Caine	England	28:27.6	
6	John Ngeno	Kenya	28:31.4	
7	Philip Ndoo	Kenya	28:42.8	
8	Kerry O'Brien	Australia	28:43.49	
9	John Stephen Akhwari	Tanzania	28:44.0	
10	Jerome Drayton	Canada	28:45.0	
11	Bernard Plain	Wales	28:51.8	
12	Derek Graham	Northern Ireland	29:00.2	
13	Richard Wedlock	Scotland	29:09.8	
14	George Waluza	Malawi	29:33.8	
15	Dave Ellis	Canada	29:37.4	
16	Alan Joslyn	Wales	29:51.8	
17	Ghulam Rasul	Pakistan	30:03.0	
18	Nabiba Temu	Kenya	30:04.4	
19	Fulgenge Rwabu	Uganda	30:44.8	
20	Douglas Zinkala	Zambia	30:54.4	
21	Allieu Massaquoi	Sierra Leone	31:06.2	
22	Dominic Chiwaya	Malawi	31:17.8	
23	Musa Mustafa	Uganda	31:32.6	
24	Richard Mabuza	Swaziland	31:33.0	
25	Robert Hackman	Ghana	31:50.4	
26	Reuben Dlamini	Swaziland	32:56.8	
27	Daniel Kalusa	Zambia	33:23.6	
	Donald Pierre	Grenada	DNF	
	Dandison Moore	Sierra Leone	DNF	
	Andrew Boychuk	Canada	DNS	
	Harry Prowell	Guyana	DNS	
