= Athletics at the 1966 British Empire and Commonwealth Games – Men's marathon =

Men's marathon at the 1966 British Empire and Commonwealth Games
- Venue: Kingston, Jamaica
- Dates: August 10, 1966

Medalists
gold medal	Jim Alder	Scotland
silver medal	Bill Adcocks	England
bronze medal	Mike Ryan	New Zealand

The men's marathon event at the 1966 British Empire and Commonwealth Games was held on 10 August in Kingston, Jamaica.

The winning margin was five seconds which as of 2024 remains the narrowest winning margin for the men's marathon at these games.

== Results ==
Marathon results
Rank	Name	Nationality	Time	Notes
1st place, gold medalist(s)	Jim Alder	Scotland	2:22:08	
2nd place, silver medalist(s)	Bill Adcocks	England	2:22:13	
3rd place, bronze medalist(s)	Mike Ryan	New Zealand	2:27:59	
4	Dave Ellis	Canada	2:31:47	
5	Jeffrey Julian	New Zealand	2:32:45	
6	Ronald Wallingford	Canada	2:35:13	
7	Christantus Nyakwoyo	Kenya	2:44:59	
8	Stanley Vennard	Northern Ireland	2:46:59	
9	Andrew Boychuk	Canada	2:58:45	
10	Omari Abdallah	Tanzania	3:08:30	
	Ron Clarke	Australia	DNF	
	Ian Blackwood	Australia	DNF	
	Tony Cook	Australia	DNF	
	Brian Kilby	England	DNF	
	Keith Graham	Jamaica	DNF	
	James Wahome	Kenya	DNF	
	Rupasinghe Perera	Ceylon	DNF	
	Bill Baillie	New Zealand	DNS	
