= Athletics at the 1970 British Commonwealth Games – Men's 5000 metres =

Men's 5000 metres at the 1970 British Commonwealth Games
- Venue: Meadowbank Stadium, Edinburgh
- Dates: ? and 25 July 1970

Medalists
gold medal	Ian Stewart	Scotland
silver medal	Ian McCafferty	Scotland
bronze medal	Kipchoge Keino	Kenya

The men's 5000 metres event at the 1970 British Commonwealth Games was held at the Meadowbank Stadium in Edinburgh, Scotland, with the final on 25 July. It was the first time that the metric distance was contested at the Games, replacing the 3 miles.

== Medallists ==
Medallists
Gold	Silver	Bronze
Ian Stewart; Scotland	Ian McCafferty; Scotland	Kipchoge Keino; Kenya

== Results ==
=== Heats ===
==== Qualification for final ====
The first 7 in each heat (Q) qualified directly for the final.

Heats results (not complete)
Rank	Heat	Name	Nationality	Time	Notes
8	1	Tony Ashton	Wales	14:17.4	
9	1	Allieu Massaquoi	Sierra Leone	14:51.0	
10	1	Robert Hackman	Ghana	14:51.6	
11	1	Dominic Chiwaya	Malawi	15:03.6	
12	1	Ghulam Rasul	Pakistan	15:12.6	
13	1	Donald Pierre	Grenada	15:51.8	
14	1	Aurelio Falero	Gibraltar	16:02.6	
	1	Tony Manning	Australia	DNS	
	1	Harnek Singh	India	DNS	
6	2	Ron Clarke	Australia	14:01.6	Q
8	2	David Mungai	Kenya	14:13.8	
9	2	David Ellis	Canada	14:14.8	
10	2	Gwynn Davis	Wales	14:22.8	
11	2	Musa Mustafa	Uganda	14:27.4	
12	2	George Waluza	Malawi	14:51.8	
13	2	Abdul Karim	Pakistan	14:52.8	
14	2	Dandison Moore	Sierra Leone	14:25.8	
	2	Kerry O'Brien	Australia	DNS	
	2	Harry Prowell	Guyana	DNS	
	2	Benson Mulomba	Zambia	DNS	

=== Final ===
Final results
Rank	Name	Nationality	Time	Notes
1st place, gold medalist(s)	Ian Stewart	Scotland	13:22.85	
2nd place, silver medalist(s)	Ian McCafferty	Scotland	13:23.34	
3rd place, bronze medalist(s)	Kipchoge Keino	Kenya	13:27.6	
4	Allan Rushmer	England	13:29.8	
5	Ron Clarke	Australia	13:32.4	
6	Dick Taylor	England	13:33.8	
7	Dick Quax	New Zealand	13:43.4	
8	John Ngeno	Kenya	13:44.6	
9	Bob Finlay	Canada	13:45.2	
10	Dick Tayler	New Zealand	13:48.8	
11	Joseph Stewart	Scotland	13:51.8	
12	Derek Graham	Northern Ireland	13:54.0	
13	Bernard Plain	Wales	14:02.0	
14	Mike Baxter	England	14:03.0	
