= .ag =

Top-level Internet domain for Antigua and Barbuda

- Introduced: 3 September 1991
- TLD type: Country code top-level domain
- Status: Active
- Registry: NicAg
- Sponsor: None
- Intended use: Entities connected with Antigua and Barbuda
- Actual use: Sees some use, most of which is unrelated to Antigua and Barbuda; used largely by companies in German-speaking countries where AG has a special meaning in company names, though its use in Germany is restricted by court order
- Registration restrictions: None
- Structure: Names can be registered directly at the second level; third-level registrations are also available under some second-level labels
- Documents: Registration terms and conditions
- Dispute policies: UDRP
- DNSSEC: Yes
- Registry website: Nic.ag

.ag is the Internet country code top-level domain (ccTLD) for Antigua and Barbuda. As of 2021 the .ag CcTLD is maintained by the UHSA School of Medicine.

== Second and third level registrations ==
Registrations can be made at the second level directly beneath .ag, or at the third level beneath:

Domain	Intended use
.com.ag	Commercial entities
.co.ag	Commercial entities
.org.ag	Organisations, especially nonprofits
.net.ag	Network operators / providers
.nom.ag	Individuals

There are no restrictions on who can register.

== Domain hacks ==
In addition to its original intended use as a country code, the .ag domain has been marketed for use for agriculture-related sites, and for sites referencing the atomic symbol for silver, Ag.

It also has a potential use for other domain hacks for English words that end in -ag. The Heritage Foundation uses .ag for URL shortening (herit.ag), as well as The Association of Former Students of Texas A&M University (tx.ag).

=== ".ag" meaning "Aktiengesellschaft" ===
Aktiengesellschaft, abbreviated AG, is a German term that refers to a corporation that is limited by shares, i.e. owned by shareholders, and may be traded on a stock market.

The term is used in Germany, Austria, and Switzerland, but not Liechtenstein or Luxembourg.

==== Legal status of .ag in Germany ====
A German court (5. Zivilsenat des Oberlandesgerichtes Hamburg) ruled in July 2004 that a .ag domain may only be registered by an Aktiengesellschaft, and then only by an AG that has the same name as the domain.

For example, a company with shareholders in Germany having the name X AG may not register as y.ag.

=== Use in Greenland ===
The newspaper Sermitsiaq uses the TLD since its merger with the paper Atuagagdliutit/Grønlandsposten, which was marketed as AG as an abbreviation of its combined Greenlandic and Danish names, thus implying a continuation of its identity.

== See also ==
- Internet in Antigua and Barbuda
