= Athletics at the 1967 Pan American Games – Men's marathon =

Men's marathon at the Pan American Games

The men's marathon event at the 1967 Pan American Games was held in Winnipeg on 5 August.

== Results ==
Rank	Name	Nationality	Time	Notes
1st place, gold medalist(s)	Andy Boychuk	Canada	2:23:03	
2nd place, silver medalist(s)	Augustín Calle	Colombia	2:25:51	
3rd place, bronze medalist(s)	Alfredo Peñaloza	Mexico	2:27:49	
4	Félix Carmona	Mexico	2:29:11	
5	Jim McDonagh	United States	2:29:25	
6	Victoriano López	Guatemala	2:41:35	
7	John Mowatt	Jamaica	2:54:53	
8	Alejandro Mendoza	Peru	3:06:20	
9	Jaime Silva	Ecuador	3:07:45	
	Jaime Sevillano	Bolivia	DNF	
	Harry Prowell	Guyana	DNF	
	Ron Daws	United States	DNF	
	Mario Cutropia	Argentina	DNF	
	Dave Ellis	Canada	DNF	
