= Athletics at the 1966 British Empire and Commonwealth Games – Men's 6 miles =

Men's 6 miles at the 1966 British Empire and Commonwealth Games
- Venue: Independence Park, Kingston
- Dates: August 6, 1966

Medalists
gold medal	Naftali Temu	Kenya
silver medal	Ron Clarke	Australia
bronze medal	Jim Alder	Scotland

The men's 6 miles event at the 1966 British Empire and Commonwealth Games was held on 6 August at the Independence Park in Kingston, Jamaica. It was the last time that the imperial distance was contested at the Games later being replaced by the 10,000 metres.

== Results ==
Results of final: GR means a Games' record
Rank	Name	Nationality	Time	Notes
1st place, gold medalist(s)	Naftali Temu	Kenya	27:14.21	GR
2nd place, silver medalist(s)	Ron Clarke	Australia	27:39.42	
3rd place, bronze medalist(s)	Jim Alder	Scotland	28:15.4	
4	Pascal Mfyomi	Tanzania	28:38.0	
5	Ron Hill	England	28:42.6	
6	Dave Ellis	Canada	28:55.4	
7	Fergus Murray	Scotland	29:40.0	
8	Andrew Boychuk	Canada	29:54.0	
9	Bill Baillie	New Zealand	30:01.0	
10	John Mowatt	Jamaica	31:13.4	
11	Harry Prowell	Guyana	31:24.0	
	Tony Cook	Australia	DNF	
	Robert Lightburn	British Honduras	DNF	
	Glenford Robinson	Jamaica	DNF	
	Bruce Tulloh	England	DNS	
	Roy Fowler	England	DNS	
	Stanley Vennard	Northern Ireland	DNS	
	Rupasinghe Perera	Ceylon	DNS	
