= Tony Pumfrey =

Welsh athlete

Personal information
- Nationality: British (Welsh)
- Born: 4 March 1932 Kent, England
- Died: 16 March 2017 Y Felinheli, Wales

Sport
- Sport: Athletics
- Event: Middle-distance / cross-country
- Club: Coventry Godiva Harriers

Anthony Frederick Pumfrey (4 March 1932 – 16 March 2017) was a track and field athlete from Wales, who competed at the 1958 British Empire and Commonwealth Games (now Commonwealth Games).

== Biography ==
Kent born Pumfrey, resided in Wales but was a member of the Coventry Godiva Harriers.

In March 1957, he finished behind Norman Horrell during the 1957 Welsh cross-country championships but was the 1957 one mile champion of Wales. The following year, he finished runner-up behind John Disley in one mile event at the 1958 AAA Welsh championships.

He represented the 1958 Welsh team at the 1958 British Empire and Commonwealth Games in Cardiff, Wales, where he participated in one event; the one mile race.
