= Athletics at the 1955 Summer International University Sports Week – Men's 5000 metres =

The men's 5000 metres event at the 1955 International University Sports Week was held in San Sebastián on 11 August 1955.

== Results ==
| Rank | Name | Nationality | Time | Notes |
|---|---|---|---|---|
| 1st place, gold medalist(s) | Adrian Jackson | Great Britain | 15:04.4 | |
| 2nd place, silver medalist(s) | Alan Gordon | Great Britain | 15:09.8 | |
| 3rd place, bronze medalist(s) | Stephan Lüpfert | West Germany | 15:11.6 | |
| 4 | Jiro Yamauchi | Japan | 15:11.6 | |
| 5 | José Molins | Spain | 15:28.0 | |
| 6 | Yves Jeannottat | Switzerland | 15:30.8 | |
| 7 | Choi Chung-sik | South Korea | ?:??.? | |
