= Harry Prowell =

Guyanese athlete (1936–2000)

Harry Prowell A.A.
Personal information
- Nationality: Guyanese
- Born: 10 July 1936 La Bonne Intention (LBI), East Coast Demerara, Guyana
- Died: 27 June 2000 (aged 63) Success, East Coast Demerara, Guyana
- Education: St Mary-ye-Virgin Anglican School Beterverwagting, Guyana
- Height: 6 ft 0 in (1.83 m)
- Weight: 123 lb (56 kg)

Sport
- Country: Guyana British Guiana
- Sport: Athletics
- Event: Marathon Half Marathon 10,000m 5000m

Achievements and titles
- Olympic finals: 1968 Summer Olympics Marathon 2:57:01 (50 out of 74)
- Personal bests: Marathon: 2:39:11 (1968) Guyana National Track and Field Record: Half Marathon: 1:14:06 (1965); 10,000 m: 31:57:03 (1960); 5000 m: 15:15:00 (1960)
Medal record
Men's athletics
Representing British Guiana
British West Indies Championships
Gold medal – first place	1965 Bridgetown	5000 m
Gold medal – first place	1960 Kingston	5000 m
Gold medal – first place	1960 Kingston	10,000 m
Silver medal – second place	1965 Bridgetown	Half Marathon
Silver medal – second place	1959 Georgetown	5000 m
Silver medal – second place	1959 Georgetown	10,000 m
Silver medal – second place	1958 Port of Spain	5000 m
Silver medal – second place	1958 Port of Spain	10,000 m

Harry Prowell A.A. (10 July 1936 – 27 June 2000) was a Guyanese long-distance runner who represented Guyana in the Marathon at the 1968 Summer Olympics in Mexico City, Mexico. He is known to be one of the greatest long distance runners Guyana and the Caribbean has ever produced, setting the national record in 1968. To date, he is the only Guyanese ever to compete in the Marathon at the Summer Olympic Games and one of the most prominent Indo-Caribbean long distance runners of his time. At the British West Indies Championships he won the gold medal in the Men's 5000m in 1965 and 1960 as well as the Gold in the 10,000m in 1960. He was a silver medalist in the Half-Marathon at the 1965 games and won Silver at both the 1959 and 1958 games in the Men's 5,000m and 10,000m events.

Prowell ran the Men's 6 miles in the 1966 British Empire and Commonwealth Games in Kingston, Jamaica. He also participated in the Men's 5000m 10,000m and the marathon at the 1967 Pan American Games in Winnipeg, Manitoba, Canada and represented Guyana at the 1970 British Commonwealth Games in Edinburgh, Scotland competing in the Men's 5,000m, 10,000m and the marathon.

Prowell holds the Guyana National Track and Field Record in the Marathon with a personal best time of 2:39:11 set on 4 February 1968 in St. Georges, Grenada. He was awarded Guyana's National Sportsman of the Year in 1969 and received the Order of Service of Guyana (Grade II) known as the Golden Arrow of Achievement in 1970.

Prowell died on 27 June 2000 at age 63 in Success, East Coast Demerara, Guyana.

== Early life and career ==
Harry Prowell was born in La Bonne Intention (LBI) Estate, East Coast Demerara, Guyana to Indo-Guyanese parents. LBI is a village 10 miles east of the capital Georgetown, Guyana. He would often be seen running from LBI to Georgetown and back again. Known to the locals for his notorious barefoot running style, he rose to prominence at St. Mary-Ye-Virgin Anglican School in Beterverwagting, Guyana. At the annual Inter Estate Athletics Championships, which was well organized and held at various Sugar Estate grounds across British Guiana, he became a household name for his success in long distance running. At these early events he would race against his future nemesis, Moses Dwarika, who would later compete alongside him for British Guiana at the British West Indies Championships.

== International career ==
=== British Guiana ===
==== 1958 British West Indies Championships ====
At the age of 22, Prowell qualified and represented British Guiana at the 1958 British West Indies Championships held in Port of Spain, Trinidad and Tobago. This would be his first international competition. He would go on to win the silver medal in the 5000m and 10,000m, setting personal best times of 15:15:00 and 31:57:03 respectively. This event showcased some of Guyana's greatest long distance runners. Prowell, Moses Dwarika, George de Peana and Ralph Gomes would go on to dominate Caribbean long distance athletics for the next decade.

==== 1959 British West Indies Championships ====
Prowell won the silver medal in both the 5000m and 10,000m race in the 1959 British West Indies Championships held in Georgetown, British Guiana.

==== 1960 British West Indies Championships ====
He finally succeeded his fellow British Guianan, George de Peana, as the dominant long-distance runner by winning Gold in both the 5000m and 10,000m races at the 1960 British West Indies Championships held in Kingston, Jamaica.

The British West Indies Championships took a four-year hiatus. With the West Indies Federation being dissolved, the 5th edition of the track and field competition for the 1964 British West Indies Championships took place in Kingston, Jamaica. Prowell's 10,000 m race had been dropped and he did not compete in the games.

==== 1965 British West Indies Championships ====
The 1965 British West Indies Championships was the sixth and final edition of the track and field competition between British colony nations in the Caribbean. It was held in Bridgetown, Barbados.

Prowell won Gold again in the 5,000m which he had won when he last competed in the 1960 event with a time of 15:30.5. He won the Silver in the 10,000m with a time of 1:14.06 behind fellow countryman Moses Dwarika who also hails from LBI. He won his 3rd Gold in the event with a time of 1:12:38.

=== Guyana ===
With British Guiana achieving independence from the United Kingdom in May 1966, Prowell would now represent the independent nation of Guyana.

==== 1966 British Empire and Commonwealth Games ====
Prowell participated in the 1966 British Empire and Commonwealth Games held in Kingston, Jamaica from 4 to 13 August. This was the first time that the Games had been held outside the so-called White Dominions. He placed 11th out of 14 runners in the Men's 6 mile event with a time of 31:24 on 6 August 1966 at the Independent Park in Kingston, Jamaica. It was the last time that the imperial distance was contested at the Games later being replaced by the 10,000 metres.

==== 1967 Pan American Games ====
In 1967, Prowell qualified for the 1967 Pan American Games in Winnipeg, Manitoba, Canada and participated in the Men's 10,000 metres on July 29, 1967, placing 8th out of 13 runners in the Final. He ran in the Men's 5000 metres and finished 10th with a time of 14.57.2 on August 2, 1967. He also ran the Men's marathon on August 5, 1967.

==== 1968 Summer Olympic Games ====
At the age of 32, the highlight of Harry Prowell's career came with representing Guyana at the 1968 Summer Olympics in Mexico City, Mexico. The race was held on Sunday 20 October 1968 and started at 15.00h (3PM EST). There were a total number of 75 competitors from 41 countries. Eighteen of them did not finish due to the high altitude of Mexico City. To date he is the only Guyanese ever to compete for Guyana in the Marathon at the Summer Olympic Games.

As Prowell was training for the 1968 Summer Olympics, he set his personal best record of 2:39:11 in a Marathon on 4 February 1968 at a track event in St. George's, Grenada. Leading up to the Olympics he also won a gold medal in the Marathon at the 1968 Texaco Southern Games in San Fernando, Trinidad, followed by a gold medal in the 3000 m race at the annual Inter Estate Athletics Championships in Guyana Notable runners Boyo Changur placed second and Gladstone Hopkinson placing third.

Guyana sent five men to the 1968 Summer Olympics. The West Indies Champion, 32-year-old Harry Prowell was a favorable contender in the Men's Marathon. It was an accomplishment just to finish this race and it was referred to as one of the slowest marathons in Olympic history. With the unfavorable conditions, Prowell placed a respectable 50th place with a time of 2:57:01.4.

==== 1970 British Commonwealth Games ====
The Edinburgh race stands out as one of his most memorable. After successfully running in the 3-mile, 6-mile and half-marathon with a time of 1 hour and 3 minutes in Trinidad, Prowell was flowing directly to Edinburgh, Scotland the very day to compete in the 1970 British Commonwealth Games in the Men's Marathon event. He also qualified for both the 5,000 and 10,000 metres event at Meadowbank Stadium in Edinburgh, Scotland.

=== Guyana National Awards ===
Harry Prowell was awarded Guyana's National Sportsman of the Year in 1969 and received the Order of Service of Guyana (Grade II) known as the Golden Arrow of Achievement in 1970.
