= Athletics at the 1958 British Empire and Commonwealth Games – Men's 1 mile =

Men's 1 mile at the 1958 British Empire and Commonwealth Games
- Venue: Cardiff Arms Park
- Start date: 24 July 1958
- End date: 26 July 1958
- Winning time: 3:59.03

Medalists
gold medal	Herb Elliott	Australia
silver medal	Merv Lincoln	Australia
bronze medal	Albie Thomas	Australia

The men's 1 mile event at the 1958 British Empire and Commonwealth Games was held on 24 and 26 July at the Cardiff Arms Park in Cardiff, Wales.

== Medalists ==
Gold	Silver	Bronze
Herb Elliott; Australia	Merv Lincoln; Australia	Albie Thomas; Australia

== Results ==
=== Heats ===
Qualification: First 3 in each heat (Q) qualify directly for the final.

Rank	Heat	Name	Nationality	Time	Notes
1	1	Herb Elliott	Australia	4:07.0	Q
2	1	Gordon Pirie	England	4:07.9	Q
3	1	Michael Blagrove	England	4:08.6	Q
4	1	Graham Everett	Scotland	4:10.0	
5	1	Tony Pumfrey	Wales	4:12.3	
6	1	Bill Baillie	New Zealand	4:13.2	
7	1	Terrence Sullivan	Southern Rhodesia	4:14.9	
8	1	Ralph Gomes	British Guiana	?:??.?	
9	1	Mike Stafford	Jersey	?:??.?	
1	2	Merv Lincoln	Australia	4:03.4	Q
2	2	Mike Berisford	Scotland	4:04.6	Q
3	2	Neville Scott	New Zealand	4:05.9	Q
4	2	Edward Morton	Canada	4:07.6	
5	2	Ian Boyd	England	4:11.6	
6	2	Harold Clark	South Africa	4:13.0	
7	2	Colin Shillington	Northern Ireland	?:??.?	
8	2	Abdul Wahab Mohamed Salleh	Sarawak	?:??.?	
1	3	Brian Hewson	England	4:09.6	Q
2	3	Murray Halberg	New Zealand	4:09.9	Q
3	3	Albie Thomas	Australia	4:10.3	Q
4	3	Alan Gordon	Scotland	4:10.7	
5	3	Nyandika Maiyoro	Kenya	4:16.1	
6	3	Brian Kitchener	Gibraltar	4:32.3	
	3	George De Peana	British Guiana	DNS	
	3	John Disley	Wales	DNS	

=== Final ===
Rank	Name	Nationality	Time	Notes
1st place, gold medalist(s)	Herb Elliott	Australia	3:59.03	
2nd place, silver medalist(s)	Merv Lincoln	Australia	4:01.80	
3rd place, bronze medalist(s)	Albie Thomas	Australia	4:02.77	
4	Gordon Pirie	England	4:04.1	
5	Murray Halberg	New Zealand	4:06.6	
6	Mike Berisford	Scotland	4:07.8	
7	Michael Blagrove	England	4:08.0	
8	Brian Hewson	England	4:11.1	
9	Neville Scott	New Zealand	4:11.9	
