= Roger Matthews =

Roger Matthews may refer to:

- Roger Matthews (criminologist) (born 1948), British criminologist
- Roger Matthews (archaeologist) (born 1954), British archaeologist
- Roger Matthews (runner) (born 1942), English long-distance runner
