= Leroy Keane =

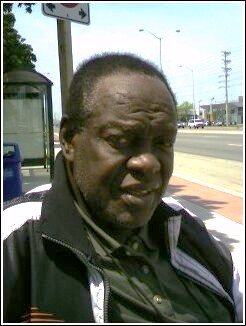
- Leroy Keane
- Born: June 26, 1937; Jamaica
- Died: July 3, 2010 (aged 73); Toronto, Ontario, Canada
- Other names: Pops, Unclelee
- Occupations: Track and field coach
- Known for: University of Nebraska (All-American), Jamaican national champion, athlete of olympian Herb Mckenley

Leroy Orville Barrington Keane (26 June 1937 – 3 July 2010) was a Jamaican National Champion and an All-American track and field athlete at the University of Nebraska. His son Martin Keane was a Canadian professional basketball player.

Born in Jamaica W.I., Keane attended Calabar High School between 1953 and 1956. In 1953, Keane broke the hurdles record in class two boys (Jamaica). At the 1957 British West Indies Championships, Keane placed 1st in the 400m hurdles for Jamaica. At the 1959 and 1960 British West Indies Championships, Keane placed in the top three, in the 110m Hurdles. Also, in the 1960 British West Indies Championships, Keane placed first in the Pentathlon.

Keane later moved to Toronto, Ontario Canada where he became a coach with the Phoenix track club. Later Keane formed his own track club called the Jamaican Canadian track club (Jacan track club).

In 2004, Keane was honoured with an award from the Calabar Old Boys Association (Canada chapter) for his community contributions.

== International competitions ==
Year	Competition	Venue	Position	Event	Notes
Representing Jamaica
1957	British West Indies Championships	Kingston, Jamaica	1st	400 m hurdles	55.3
1958	British West Indies Championships	Kingston, Jamaica	1st	400 m hurdles	55.3
1959	British West Indies Championships	Georgetown, British Guiana	3rd	110 m hurdles	
1959	British West Indies Championships	Georgetown, British Guiana	2nd	400 m hurdles	
1960	British West Indies Championships	Kingston, Jamaica	2nd	110 m hurdles	15.1
1960	British West Indies Championships	Kingston, Jamaica	1st	400 m hurdles	53.7
1962	Central American and Caribbean Games	Kingston, Jamaica	5th	400 m hurdles	53.8
