= Athletics at the 1967 Pan American Games – Men's 10,000 metres =

Men's 10,000 metres at the Pan American Games

The men's 10,000 metres event at the 1967 Pan American Games was held in Winnipeg on 29 July.

== Results ==
Rank	Name	Nationality	Time	Notes
1st place, gold medalist(s)	Van Nelson	United States	29:17.4	
2nd place, silver medalist(s)	Dave Ellis	Canada	29:18.4	
3rd place, bronze medalist(s)	Tom Laris	United States	29:21.6	
4	Juan Máximo Martínez	Mexico	29:27.2	
5	Víctor Mora	Colombia	30:57.8	
6	Ron Wallingford	Canada	31:03.4	
7	Mario Cutropia	Argentina	??:??.?	
8	Harry Prowell	Guyana	??:??.?	
9	Valentino Robles	Mexico	??:??.?	
10	John Mowatt	Jamaica	??:??.?	
	Osvaldo Suárez	Argentina	DNF	
	Jaime Sevillano	Bolivia	DNF	
	Joachim Velázquez	Colombia	DNF	
