= Blagrove =

Blagrove is a surname. Notable people with the surname include:

- Henry Blagrove (1887–1939), rear-admiral of the British Royal Navy
- Henry Blagrove (violinist), (1811–1872), English violinist
- Mark Blagrove, British psychogist researching sleep and dreams.
- Michael Blagrove (1934–2016), English athlete in the 1958 British Empire and Commonwealth Games
- William Blagrove (fl. early 19th century), bookseller, publisher and librarian in Boston, Massachusetts, U.S.

== See also ==
- Blagrove Common, a Site of Special Scientific Interest in Green End, Hertfordshire
