= 1965 British West Indies Championships =

The 1965 British West Indies Championships was the sixth and final edition of the track and field competition between British colony nations in the Caribbean. It was held in Bridgetown, Barbados in late July. The dissolution of the West Indies Federation, and the broader sports co-operation it had engendered, left the competition without the support to continue. A total of 28 events were contested, eighteen by men and ten by women. The men's half marathon, pole vault and relay races were all revived for this final edition, although the 3000 metres steeplechase was dropped. Jamaica was the most successful nation, taking seventeen of the titles on offer – it was Jamaica's fourth win at the competition and the only time a host nation did not top the medal table.

Wellesley Clayton was the only male athlete to defend his title from the 1964 championships, winning the long jump for a second time. On the women's side Carmen Smith retained her 100 metres title and Una Morris finished undefeated in the 400 metres. Joan Gordon won both the shot put and discus throw for a second time running, while Beverley Welsh was again victorious in the long jump. Billy Montague was the last man to win two individual gold medals at the same championships, scoring a hurdles double. Two sons of then-Chief Minister of Antigua Vere Bird (Ivor and Lester) won medals at the tournament.

Despite this being the final edition, the standard of performances was comparatively high, with thirteen championship records being equalled or bettered. The men's 100 metres winner Lennox Miller went on to claim Olympic silver three years later. Long-time participants George Kerr and Harry Prowell both returned to the podium and claimed their eighth career medal of the championships, while Clifton Bertrand (the inaugural 200 m champion) won his sixth individual sprint medal here.

After the end of the British West Indies championships, athletics competition between Caribbean nations continued in the form of the long-standing quadrennial Central American and Caribbean Games. In addition, a new venue for such contests followed soon after the dissolution of the championships: the biennial Central American and Caribbean Championships in Athletics was launched in 1967.

== Medal summary ==
=== Men ===
Event	Gold		Silver		Bronze	
100 metres	Lennox Miller (JAM)	10.6	Pablo McNeil (JAM)	10.7	Winston Short (TRI)	10.9
200 metres	Pablo McNeil (JAM)	20.8 CR	Clifton Bertrand (TRI)	20.9	Winston Short (TRI)	21.3
400 metres	Laurie Kahn (JAM)	46.7 CR=	Lloyd Bacchus (BGU)	46.8	Keith Forde (BAR)	47.4
800 metres	Keith Forde (BAR)	1:51.1	Alex McDonald (JAM)	1:51.1	Lloyd Bacchus (BGU)	1:52.5
1500 metres	Neville Myton (JAM)	4:03.4	Casper Springer (BAR)	4:04.0	Lennox Yearwood (TRI)	4:05.6
5000 metres	Harry Prowell (BGU)	15:30.5	Moses Dwarika (BGU)	???	George Kerr (JAM)	16:00.8
110 m hurdles	Billy Montague (TRI)	14.8	Winston Jerrick (BGU)	15.0	Wilhelm Joseph (TRI)	15.0
400 m hurdles	Billy Montague (TRI)	54.0	Charles Clarke (JAM)	54.1	Anthony Carr (JAM)	???
4 × 100 m relay	Jamaica (JAM)	41.0 CR	Trinidad and Tobago (TRI)	41.2	Guiana (BGU)	41.4
4 × 400 m relay	Jamaica (JAM)	3:11.5	Barbados (BAR)	3:13.8	Trinidad and Tobago (TRI)	3:16.2
Half marathon	Moses Dwarika (BGU)	1:12:38	Harry Prowell (BGU)	1:14:06	Vinton Powell (JAM)	1:17:04
High jump	Ivor Bird (ATG)	2.00 m	Anton Norris (BAR)	2.00 m	Trevor Tennant (JAM)	??? m
Pole vault	Wilhelm Joseph (TRI)	3.81 m CR	Dan Winsboro (VIN)	3.50 m	Ayrton Clouden (VIN)	??? m
Long jump	Wellesley Clayton (JAM)	7.26 m	Allan Callender (TRI)	6.86 m	Trevor Thomas (JAM)	??? m
Triple jump	Trevor Thomas (JAM)	15.03 m	Lennox Burgher (JAM)	14.88 m	Billy Montague (TRI)	14.37 m
Shot put	William Barrow (ATG)	14.22 m CR	Carlton Spencer (JAM)	14.15 m	Lester Bird (ATG)	14.08 m
Discus throw	Robert Darlow (JAM)	46.48 m CR	Winston Burt (JAM)	??? m	Colville Moore (TRI)	40.74 m
Javelin throw	Ayrton Clouden (VIN)	58.03 m	Thomas Lawrence (GRN)	??? m	Felix Bentham (JAM)	??? m

=== Women ===
Event	Gold		Silver		Bronze	
100 metres	Carmen Smith (JAM)	11.9	Adlin Mair (JAM)	12.0	Thora Best (TRI)	12.1
200 metres	Vilma Charlton (JAM)	24.2	Jocelyn Haynes (TRI)	25.0	Aldene Holder (BAR)	???
400 metres	Una Morris (JAM)	57.3 CR	Jocelyn Haynes (TRI)	57.9	Octavia Straker (TRI)	???
80 m hurdles	Thora Best (TRI)	11.4 CR=	Carmen Smith (JAM)	11.5	Adlin Mair (JAM)	11.6
4 × 100 m relay	Jamaica (JAM)	46.3 CR	Trinidad and Tobago (TRI)	49.0	Barbados (BAR)	???
High jump	Patsy Callender (BAR)	1.67 m CR	Clovis Arthur (BAR)	1.65 m	Unknown athlete	??? m
Long jump	Beverley Welsh (JAM)	5.73 m CR	Thora Best (TRI)	??? m	O. Watson (JAM)	??? m
Shot put	Joan Gordon (JAM)	11.88 m CR	Yvonne Mitchell (TRI)	??? m	Unknown athlete	??? m
Discus throw	Joan Gordon (JAM)	36.09 m CR	Vicky Clarke (TRI)	??? m	Veronica Murren (TRI)	??? m
Javelin throw	Eileen Sutherland (JAM)	36.70 m	Veronica Murren (TRI)	??? m	Yvonne Mitchell (TRI)	??? m
