= Ralph Gomes =

Guyanese track & field athlete (1937–2020)

Personal information
- Born: 13 June 1937 Uitvlugt, British Guiana
- Died: 16 March 2020 (aged 82)
- Height: 1.73 m (5 ft 8 in)
- Weight: 64 kg (141 lb)
Medal record
Men's Athletics
Representing British Guiana
Central American and Caribbean Games
Gold medal – first place	1959 Caracas	800 metres
Silver medal – second place	1962 Kingston	1500 metres
Bronze medal – third place	1959 Caracas	1500 metres

Ralph Gomes (born 13 June 1937 in Uitvlugt; died 16 March 2020) was a track and field athlete from Guyana. He competed in the middle-distances, and represented his native country at the 1960 Summer Olympics in Rome, Italy.

== International competitions ==
Year	Competition	Venue	Position	Event	Notes
Representing British Guiana
1958	British West Indies Championships	Port of Spain, Trinidad and Tobago	1st	1500 m	3:56.2
1958	British West Indies Championships	Port of Spain, Trinidad and Tobago	3rd	5000 m	15:21.3
1958	British Empire and Commonwealth Games	Cardiff, United Kingdom	8th (h)	1 mle	NT
1959	Central American and Caribbean Games	Caracas, Venezuela	1st	800 m	1:57.7
1959	Central American and Caribbean Games	Caracas, Venezuela	3rd	1500 m	4:08.16
1959	British West Indies Championships	Georgetown, British Guiana	1st	1500 m	3:54.7
1959	Pan American Games	Chicago, United States	7th	1500 m	4:00.5
1960	British West Indies Championships	Kingston, Jamaica	2nd	800 m	1:50.6
1960	British West Indies Championships	Kingston, Jamaica	1st	1500 m	3:58.6
1960	Olympic Games	Rome, Italy	2nd (qf)	800 m	1:52.47
1962	Central American and Caribbean Games	Kingston, Jamaica	6th	800 m	1:56.9
1962	Central American and Caribbean Games	Kingston, Jamaica	2nd	1500 m	3:52.5

== Personal bests ==
- 800 metres – 1:50.6h (1960)
