= Ivor Bird =

Antiguan businessman (1944–2024)

Ivor Grenville Theophilus Bird (29 February 1944 – 3 December 2024) was an Antiguan businessman and the son of Vere Bird, one-time Prime Minister of Antigua and Barbuda.

Bird was a high jumper and he was the last gold medallist in that event at the British West Indies Championships in 1965. His brother, Lester Bird, was also a track athlete and former champion at this competition. Ivor Bird also represented Antigua and Barbuda in high jump at the 1966 British Empire and Commonwealth Games.

The director of ZDK, Antigua's government broadcasting system, in 1995 Bird was caught smuggling 10 kg of cocaine through V. C. Bird International Airport with an accomplice, Marcus Alberto Chapman. He was formally charged with possession of cocaine with the intent to both sell and transfer by Judge Mario Ducillo, and released on 50,000 East Caribbean dollars bail. Having pleaded not guilty, he was represented by John Platts-Mills, Steadroy Benjamin, and David Toms, Jr.; despite this representation, he was convicted on 15 May 1995 following 45 minutes of deliberations. He was ordered to either pay a fine of 200,000 dollars or face two years in jail, and paid the fine shortly before the court closed; he continued to serve as head of ZDK.

On 3 December 2024, Bird was found dead at his residence in Halcyon Heights. He was 79.
