= Stan Vennard =

Northern Irish athlete

Personal information
- Nationality: British (Northern Irish)
- Born: c.1939
- Died: January 2018

Sport
- Sport: Athletics
- Event: Long-distance / cross-country
- Club: Royal Ulster Constabulary AC; Duncairn Nomads AC

Stanley H. Vennard (c.1939– January 2018) was an athlete from Northern Ireland, who represented Northern Ireland at the British Empire and Commonwealth Games (now Commonwealth Games).

== Biography ==
Vennard was a constable with the Royal Ulster Constabulary and was a member of their Athletics Club. He also ran for the Duncairn Nomads Athletic Club and was the 1959 Irish marathon champion. A civil servant, he was also the six-miles Northern Ireland champion in 1960 at the age of 21.

He married Norma McInnes in August 1963 and was a student teacher at Stranmillis University College.

Vennard represented the 1966 Northern Irish Team at the 1966 British Empire and Commonwealth Games in Kingston, Jamaica, participating in the two athletics events; the 6 miles race and the marathon.

Vennard was a seven-times Northern Irish champion, winning the 3 miles title in 1966, the 6 miles titles in 1960 and 1966, three marathon titles (1960, 1966, 1967) and the cross-country title in 1967.

He completed his teaching career at the Moira Primary School, where he was the head. He died in January 2018.
