= 1960 British West Indies Championships =

The 1960 British West Indies Championships was the fourth edition of the track and field competition held between the colonies of the United Kingdom in the British West Indies. It was held in Kingston, Jamaica. A total of 31 events were contested, twenty-two by men and nine by women. The women's programme was extended with three throwing events. A new men's event was also included: the athletics pentathlon was the first and only time that a combined track and field event was contested at the completion.

Jamaica's Anne Golding was the most successful athlete of the tournament, winning all three inaugural women's throwing events. Harry Prowell succeeded his fellow British Guianan, George de Peana, as the dominant long-distance runner by winning the 5000 m and 10,000 m races. Leroy Keane of Jamaica was the only other athlete to win two titles: he topped the podium in the 400 metres hurdles and also the pentathlon. Six men managed to retain their 1959 titles: Wilton Jackson (200 m), George Kerr (800 m), Ralph Gomes (a third 1500 m title), Keith Gardner (110 m hurdles), Moses Dwarika (half marathon) and Sydney Thomas (3000 m walk). Brenda Archer was the only woman to defend her 1959 title, doing so in the women's high jump.

This competition preceded the assembly of the first British West Indies Olympic team. At the 1960 Summer Olympics, the federation won two medals: reigning British West Indies 800 m champion George Kerr took the bronze medal in his speciality, and a team of Kerr, James Wedderburn, Gardner and Mal Spence won a second bronze in the 4×400 metres relay.

Saint Lucia had its first ever medallist at the tournament in the form of Imbert Roberts's gold in the men's shot put.

== Medal summary ==
=== Men ===
Event	Gold		Silver		Bronze	
100 metres	Tom Robinson (BAH)	10.4	Dennis Johnson (JAM)	10.4	Al Phillips (JAM)	10.6
200 metres	Wilton Jackson (TRI)	21.1	Keith Gardner (JAM)	21.2	Clifton Bertrand (TRI)	21.3
400 metres	Mal Spence (JAM)	46.7	George Kerr (JAM)	46.8	Mel Spence (JAM)	47.1
800 metres	George Kerr (JAM)	1:49.8	Ralph Gomes (BGU)	1:50.6	Kervin Thomas (JAM)	1:51.3
1500 metres	Ralph Gomes (BGU)	3:58.6	Knolly Barnes (TRI)	3:59.1	M. Perry (BGU)	4:03.0
5000 metres	Harry Prowell (BGU)	15:15.0	Glenroy Charles (TRI)	15:26.1	J. Davis (BGU)	15:26.7
10,000 metres	Harry Prowell (BGU)	31:57.3	J. Davis (BGU)	32:15.0	Glenroy Charles (TRI)	32:41.5
110 m hurdles	Keith Gardner (JAM)	14.5	Leroy Keane (JAM)	15.1	Ray Davis (TRI)	15.7
400 m hurdles	Leroy Keane (JAM)	53.7	Basil Bonair (TRI)	55.5	Cliff Murray (BGU)	56.6
3000 metres steeplechase	Glenroy Charles (TRI)	10:58.5	Clem Fields (BGU)	11:15.3	R. Williams (BGU)	???
4 × 100 m relay	Jamaica (JAM)	41.5	British Guiana (BGU)	42.7	Bahamas (BAH)	45.8
4 × 400 m relay	Jamaica (JAM)	3:09.2	British Guiana (BGU)	3:18.8	Trinidad and Tobago (TTO)	3:24.3
Half marathon	Moses Dwarkia (BGU)	1:11:13	Clem Fields (BGU)	1:12:41	S. Ramnarine (BGU)	1:12:42
3000 metres track walk	Sydney Thomas (TRI)	15:05.6	Amelius Murrin (TRI)	15:10.5	D. Richards (ATG)	17:13.4
High jump	Ernle Haisley (JAM)	2.02 m	Learie Scipio (TRI)	1.85 m	L. Greene (BGU)	1.80 m
Pole vault	Reginald Dash (BGU)	3.69 m	R. Mannaing (JAM)	3.50 m	Ken Jones (TRI)	3.50 m
Long jump	Paul Foreman (JAM)	7.55 m	Victor Brooks (JAM)	7.36 m	Lester Bird (ATG)	7.24 m
Triple jump	Mahoney Samuels (JAM)	15.47 m	Learie Scipio (TRI)	14.31 m	Victor Brooks (JAM)	14.18 m
Shot put	Imbert Roberts (LCA)	13.79 m	Keith Fraser (BGU)	13.70 m	Philippian Young (TRI)	13.22 m
Discus throw	Henry Greaux (ATG)	42.79 m	Aubrey Edwards (TRI)	39.76 m	Hugh Malcolm (JAM)	38.51 m
Javelin throw	Winston Thompson (TRI)	62.10 m	Dermott Nugent (BAR)	55.05 m	Hugh Malcolm (JAM)	??? m
Pentathlon	Leroy Keane (JAM)	2512 pts	Wellesley Clayton (JAM)	2289 pts	Cliff Murray (BGU)	2243 pts

=== Women ===
Event	Gold		Silver		Bronze	
100 metres	Sybil Donmartin (TRI)	12.4	Ouida Walker (JAM)	12.5	Myra Fawcett (BGU)	12.6
200 metres	Ouida Walker (JAM)	25.3	Eastlyn Clarke (TRI)	25.5	W. Parris (BGU)	???
80 m hurdles	Merlyn Reid (TRI)	13.1	E. Smith (JAM)	13.3	B. Jones (JAM)	13.8
4 × 100 m relay	Trinidad and Tobago (TTO)	50.4	British Guiana (BGU)	50.8	Unknown team	???
High jump	Brenda Archer (BGU)	1.61 m	B. Buckley (JAM)	1.50 m	E. Davis (ATG)	??? m
Long jump	Yvonne Laidlow (JAM)	5.52 m	Merlyn Reid (TRI)	5.05 m	D. Forde (BGU)	5.03 m
Shot put	Anne Golding (JAM)	9.80 m	Marilyn Bayley (TRI)	8.85 m	Brenda Archer (BGU)	8.39 m
Discus throw	Anne Golding (JAM)	29.98 m	W. Parris (BGU)	25.40 m	Marilyn Bayley (TRI)	24.97 m
Javelin throw	Anne Golding (JAM)	29.79 m	Eileen Sutherland (JAM)	29.10 m	Marilyn Bayley (TRI)	27.76 m
