= Telecommunications in Antigua and Barbuda =

Telecommunications in Antigua and Barbuda are via media in the telecommunications industry.

== Telephone ==
Telephones – main lines in use: 37,500 (2006)

country comparison to the world: 168

Telephones – mobile cellular: 110,200 (2006) (APUA PCS, Cable & Wireless, Digicel)

country comparison to the world: 177

Telephone system:
domestic: good automatic telephone system
international: 3 fiber optic submarine cables (2 to Saint Kitts and 1 to Guadeloupe); satellite earth station – 1 Intelsat (Atlantic Ocean)

== Radio ==
Radio broadcast stations: AM 4, FM 6, shortwave 0 (2002)

Radio Stations of Antigua and Barbuda
| Band / Freq. | Call Sign | Brand | City of license | Notes |
|---|---|---|---|---|
| AM 620 | V2C | ABS Radio and TV | Saint John's, Antigua | ABS; 5 kW |
| AM 1100 | ZDK | Radio ZDK | Saint John's, Antigua | Owner: Grenville Radio; 20 kW |
| AM 1160 | Unknown | Radio Lighthouse | Saint John's, Antigua | 10 kW |
| AM 1580 | Unknown | Unknown | Judge Bay, Antigua | 50 kW |
| FM 88.5 | Unknown | Power FM | Saint John's, Antigua | |
| FM 89.7 | Unknown | Catholic Radio | Saint John's, Antigua | 2 kW |
| FM 90.5 | V2C-FM | ABS Radio and TV | Saint John's, Antigua | repeats AM 620 |
| FM 91.1 | Unknown | Observer Radio | Saint John's, Antigua | |
| FM 91.9 | Unknown | Hitz 91.9 | Saint John's, Antigua | |
| FM 92.3 | Unknown | Radio Lighthouse | Saint John's, Antigua | repeats AM 1160 |
| FM 92.9 | VYBZ-FM | Vybz FM | Saint John's, Antigua | |
| FM 93.9 | Unknown | Caribbean SuperStation | Saint John's, Antigua | repeats Caribbean SuperStation from Trinidad |
| FM 95.7 | Unknown | Zoom Radio | Saint John's, Antigua | |
| FM 97.1 | ZDK | Radio ZDK | Saint John's, Antigua | repeats AM 1100 |
| FM 98.5 | Unknown | Red Hot Radio | Saint John's, Antigua | |
| FM 99.1 | Unknown | Hit Radio Music Power | Saint John's, Antigua | |
| FM 100.1 | Unknown (ZDKR-FM?) | Sun FM | Saint John's, Antigua | |
| FM 101.5 | Unknown | Second Advent Radio | Saint John's, Antigua | 20 watts |
| FM 102.3 | Unknown | Variety Radio | Saint John's, Antigua | |
| FM 103.1 | Unknown | Life FM | Codrington, Barbuda | 1 kW |
| FM 103.9 | Unknown | Life FM | Saint John's, Antigua | repeats 103.1 Codrington |
| FM 104.3 | Unknown | Nice FM | Codrington, Barbuda | |
| FM 107.3 | Unknown | Crusader Radio | Saint John's, Antigua | |
| SW 3.255 mHz | V2C | ABS Radio and TV | Saint John's, Antigua | Repeats AM 620 |

Radios: 36,000 (1997)

== Television ==
Television broadcast stations: 2 (1997) (including ABS-TV)

Televisions: 31,000 (1997)

== Internet ==
Internet Service Providers (ISPs): Flow, Digicel, Antigua Computer Technologies (ACT), and Antigua Public Utilities Authority (APUA INET)

Internet hosts: 2,215 (2008)

Internet users: 72,900 (2025)

Country codes: AG

== Demographics ==
Internet Users by Ethnicity
| Q48 Ethnic | Q55 Internet Use | | |
| Q48 Ethnic | Yes | No | Don't know/Not stated |
|---|---|---|---|
| African descendant | 47.42% | 50.74% | 1.84% |
| Caucasian/White | 83.27% | 16.03% | 0.70% |
| East Indian/India | 58.66% | 40.08% | 1.26% |
| Mixed (Black/White) | 64.34% | 33.35% | 2.31% |
| Mixed (Other) | 61.22% | 37.62% | 1.16% |
| Hispanic | 31.78% | 66.80% | 1.42% |
| Syrian/Lebanese | 60.77% | 36.76% | 2.48% |
| Other | 59.46% | 39.71% | 0.83% |
| Don't know/Not stated | 20.58% | 70.61% | 8.81% |
| Total | 48.35% | 49.81% | 1.84% |

Household internet access by ethnicity
| Q48 Ethnic | Q25 4 Internet access | | |
| Q48 Ethnic | No | Yes | Don't know/not declared |
|---|---|---|---|
| African descendant | 51.99% | 38.20% | 9.81% |
| Caucasian/White | 14.56% | 82.83% | 2.61% |
| East Indian/India | 36.63% | 54.93% | 8.44% |
| Mixed (Black/White) | 39.47% | 54.60% | 5.93% |
| Mixed (Other) | 41.76% | 51.53% | 6.71% |
| Hispanic | 67.68% | 20.56% | 11.76% |
| Syrian/Lebanese | 29.48% | 69.39% | 1.13% |
| Other | 34.02% | 58.96% | 7.02% |
| Don't know/Not stated | 53.86% | 27.58% | 18.56% |
| Total | 50.83% | 39.61% | 9.57% |

== See also ==
- Antigua and Barbuda
- History of telecommunication
- List of telecommunications terminology
- Outline of telecommunication
