= Mike Ryan (runner) =

New Zealand long-distance runner

Personal information
- Born: Michael Robert Ryan; 26 December 1941 (age 84) Bannockburn, Stirlingshire, Scotland
- Height: 176 cm (5 ft 9 in)
- Weight: 70 kg (154 lb)
Medal record
Men's athletics
Representing New Zealand
Olympic Games
Bronze medal – third place	1968 Mexico City	Marathon
Commonwealth Games
Bronze medal – third place	1966 Kingston	Marathon

Michael Robert Ryan (born 26 December 1941 in Bannockburn, Stirlingshire) is a former long-distance runner, who was born in Scotland. He won the bronze medal for New Zealand in the men's marathon at the 1968 Summer Olympics held in Mexico City, Mexico. In 1966 he won the famous Fukuoka Marathon in Japan with a time of 2:14:05.

Ryan was inducted into the New Zealand Sports Hall of Fame in 2008.
