= Brenda Archer =

Guyanese high jumper

Personal information
- Born: 17 September 1942 (age 83) Georgetown, British Guiana
- Height: 1.66 m (5 ft 5 in)
- Weight: 59 kg (130 lb)
Medal record
Women's Athletics
Representing British Guiana
Central American and Caribbean Games
Gold medal – first place	1962 Kingston	High Jump

Brenda Archer (born 17 September 1942 in Georgetown, Demerara-Mahaica) is a retired female track and field athlete from Guyana. She competed in the high jump, and represented her native country at the 1960 Summer Olympics in Rome, Italy, finishing in 20th place.

== International competitions ==
Year	Competition	Venue	Position	Event	Notes
Representing British Guiana
1959	British West Indies Championships	Georgetown, British Guiana	1st	High jump	1.47 m
1960	British West Indies Championships	Kingston, Jamaica	1st	High jump	1.61 m
1960	British West Indies Championships	Kingston, Jamaica	3rd	Long jump	8.39 m
1960	Olympic Games	Rome, Italy	20th (q)	High jump	1.55 m
1962	Central American and Caribbean Games	Kingston, Jamaica	1st	High jump	1.53 m

== Personal bests ==
- High jump – 1.61 metres (1960)
