= 1959 British West Indies Championships =

The 1959 British West Indies Championships was the third edition of the track and field competition between British colony nations in the Caribbean. It was held in Georgetown in British Guiana on 8 and 9 August. A total of 27 events were contested, twenty-one by men and six by women. This was the first time that women had been able to compete at the event. Three new men's events were added to the programme: 3000 metres steeplechase, half marathon, and the 3000 metres walk. The latter two were the first road running and racewalking events to be included.

For a third time running, George de Peana of British Guiana won both the 5000 metres and 10,000 metres titles, remaining undefeated at the tournament. Aside from de Peana, Ralph Gomes was the only other athlete to defend his title from the 1958 edition, doing so in the 1500 metres. George Kerr rose to prominence with a 400 metres and 800 metres double – distances he would win Olympic medals in a year later. In the women's section, the British Guiana team were dominant, being led by double individual sprint medallist Myrna Fawcett.

Also among the gold medallists was Antigua's Lester Bird, winner of the long jump here, who would later go on to be the Prime Minister of Antigua and Barbuda (succeeding his father, Vere Bird). Triple jump medallist Wendell Mottley also became involved in politics later in his life, serving as Trinidad and Tobago's Finance Minister, and high jumper Anton Norris was another athlete in the field to become a prominent economist in the region.

== Medal summary ==
=== Men ===
Event	Gold		Silver		Bronze	
100 metres	Mike Agostini (TRI)	10.4	Denis Johnson (JAM)	???	Keith Gardner (JAM)	???
200 metres	Wilton Jackson (TRI)	21.4	Keith Gardner (JAM)	???	Mike Agostini (TRI)	???
400 metres	George Kerr (JAM)	46.8	Mal Spence (JAM)	???	Mel Spence (JAM)	???
800 metres	George Kerr (JAM)	1:53.6	Tony Seth (BGU)	???	Mel Spence (JAM)	???
1500 metres	Ralph Gomes (BGU)	3:54.7	M. Perry (BGU)	???	McDonald Philbert (TRI)	???
5000 metres	George de Peana (BGU)	15:02.0	Harry Prowell (BGU)	???	Glenroy Charles (TRI)	???
10,000 metres	George de Peana (BGU)	31:58.6	Harry Prowell (BGU)	???	Moses Dwarika (BGU)	???
110 m hurdles	Keith Gardner (JAM)	14.4	Cliff Murray (BGU)	???	Leroy Keane (JAM)	???
400 m hurdles	Basil Bonair (TRI)	53.4	Leroy Keane (JAM)	???	William Gittens (GRN)	???
3000 metres steeplechase	Clem Fields (BGU)	10:31.0	R. Williams (BGU)	???	Glenroy Charles (TRI)	???
4×100 m relay	Jamaica (JAM)	42.2	Trinidad and Tobago (TTO)	???	Guiana (BGU)	???
4×400 m relay	Jamaica (JAM); Mal Spence; Thomas; Mel Spence; George Kerr	3:09.5	Trinidad and Tobago (TTO)	???	Guiana (BGU)	???
Half marathon	Moses Dwarika (BGU)	1:10:33	Unknown athlete	???	Unknown athlete	???
3000 metres track walk	Sydney Thomas (TRI)	15:19.2	Amelius Murrin (TRI)	???	G. Mars (BGU)	???
High jump	Clifton Bertrand (TRI)	2.01 m	L. Greene (BGU)	1.90 m	Anton Norris (BAR)	1.90 m
Pole vault	Robert Morris (JAM)	3.64 m	Gregor Hinkson (TRI)	3.50 m	Richard Thelwell (JAM)	3.50 m
Long jump	Lester Bird (ATG)	7.50 m	Deryck Taylor (JAM)	7.19 m	Wellesley Clayton (JAM)	7.01 m
Triple jump	Mahoney Samuels (JAM)	14.74 m	Wendell Mottley (TRI)	14.48 m	Keith Thelwell (JAM)	14.20 m
Shot put	Keith Fraser (BGU)	13.69 m	Conrad Derrick (TRI)	13.35 m	Milton Bernard (JAM)	??? m
Discus throw	Leroy Williams (TRI)	38.61 m	Aubrey Edwards (TRI)	??? m	William Hall (JAM)	??? m
Javelin throw	Dermott Nugent (BAR)	52.39 m	Winston Thompson (TRI)	??? m	Hugh Garrick (TRI)	??? m

=== Women ===
Event	Gold		Silver		Bronze	
100 metres	Myrna Fawcett (BGU)	12.2	Y. Smith (BGU)	???	Claudette Masdammer (BGU)	???
200 metres	Myrna Fawcett (BGU)	25.2	Y. Smith (BGU)	???	W. Parris (BGU)	???
80 m hurdles	W. Parris (BGU)	13.0	Pearl Joseph (TRI)	???	E. Davis (ATG)	???
4×100 m relay	Guiana (BGU)	49.9	Trinidad and Tobago (TTO)	???	Jamaica (JAM)	???
High jump	Brenda Archer (BGU)	1.47 m	S. Burgess (JAM)	1.47 m	E. Davis (ATG)	1.42 m
Long jump	Yvonne Laidlow (JAM)	5.46 m	Claudette Masdammer (BGU)	5.07 m	W. Parris (BGU)	4.96 m
