= Pointe Broadcasting Network =

Antiguan media company

The Pointe Broadcasting Network (PBN) is a media company based in Point, St. John's, Antigua and Barbuda. The company has a large social media and radio presence, and also publishes an online newspaper and maintains a television station. The network has various shareholders including a charity owned by Maria Browne, the spouse of prime minister Gaston Browne.

There are many programs associated with the company, including The Browne & Browne Show, which has become a major press outlet for Gaston Browne, and its affiliation with the Browne political family has brought it significant resources and viewership. Gaston Browne himself states that he is not a shareholder in the company, although it is general considered to be aligned with his Labour Party government. Speaking on behalf of the company, Gaston Browne states that the network is not intended to compete with another Labour Party–aligned outlet, ZDK.

PBN is based in the St. John's City West constituency, with an emphasis on Point and Villa.
