= 1958 British West Indies Championships =

The 1958 British West Indies Championships was the second edition of the track and field competition between British colony nations in the Caribbean held in Port of Spain, Trinidad and Tobago between 20 and 22 April. A total of eighteen events were contested, all of them by men – women's events were not added until the following year.

George de Peana of British Guiana defended his 5000 metres/10,000 metres double from the previous edition. Trinidadian sprinters Hendrickson Harewood and Clifton Bertrand also defended their titles in the 100 metres and 200 metres, respectively. Betrand added the 400 metres title to his 200 m to become the first person to win two different sprint events at the competition.

The Trinidad and Tobago national championships were not held that year, as the country's governing body focused on hosting the wider regional tournament. The host nation topped the medal table at the competition, winning ten of the eighteen events on offer. Jamaica came second, with four gold medals, followed by British Guiana on three. William Gittens's gold for Grenada in the 400 metres hurdles made his country's first medallist at the championships, and also the first winner from outside of the three aforementioned nations.

== Medal summary ==
Event	Gold		Silver		Bronze	
100 metres	Hendrickson Harewood (TRI)	10.4	Joe Goddard (TRI)	10.4	Ralph Lewis (TRI)	10.5
200 metres	Clifton Bertrand (TRI)	21.2	Hendrickson Harewood (TRI)	21.3	Joe Goddard (TRI)	21.7
400 metres	Clifton Bertrand (TRI)	47.3	Middleton Archibald (BLI)	47.4	Wilton Jackson (TRI)	48.5
800 metres	Hugh Hyland (TRI)	1:53.5	Charles Boney (TRI)	1:55.0	Goodleigh (JAM)	1:55.5
1500 metres	Ralph Gomes (BGU)	3:56.2	Hugh Hyland (TRI)	4:00.6	Christie (JAM)	4:02.8
5000 metres	George de Peana (BGU)	15:10.0	Harry Prowell (BGU)	15:15.0	Ralph Gomes (BGU)	15:21.3
10,000 metres	George de Peana (BGU)	32:58	Harry Prowell (BGU)	34:08	Moses Dwarika (BGU)	36:17
110 m hurdles	Bill Phillips (JAM)	14.6	Hollis Regis (TRI)	14.8	Deryck Taylor (JAM)	15.0
400 m hurdles	William Gittens (GRN)	53.8	Ray Davis (TRI)	53.8	Charles Boney (TRI)	55.1
4×100 m relay	Trinidad and Tobago (TRI); G. Lewis; Edmund Turton; Hendrickson Harewood; Joe Goddard	41.6	Jamaica (JAM)	42.0	Guiana (BGU)	42.2
4×400 m relay	Trinidad and Tobago (TRI)	3:21.2	Jamaica (JAM)	???	Guiana (BGU)	???
High jump	Learie Scipio (TRI)	1.90 m	William Gittens (GRN)	1.88 m	Pat Arthurs (JAM)	1.83 m
Pole vault	Pat Arthurs (JAM)	3.71 m	Gregor Hinkson (TRI)	3.50 m	Ken Jones (TRI)	3.43 m
Long jump	George Hislop (TRI)	7.12 m	Deryck Taylor (JAM)	7.02 m	Guilford James (JAM)	7.00 m
Triple jump	Learie Scipio (TRI)	14.37 m	Audley Hewitt (JAM)	14.33 m	Deryck Taylor (JAM)	14.16 m
Shot put	Conrad Derrick (TRI)	13.01 m	Keith Fraser (BGU)	12.79 m	Philippian Young (TRI)	12.60 m
Discus throw	William Hall (JAM)	37.73 m	Hugh Malcolm (JAM)	37.48 m	Calvin Downie (JAM)	36.87 m
Javelin throw	Hugh Malcolm (JAM)	54.61 m	Calvin Downie (JAM)	49.53 m	Hugh Garrick (TRI)	48.13 m
