= Graham Everett (athlete) =

Scottish athlete (1934–2017)

Personal information
- Nationality: British (Scottish)
- Born: 20 January 1934 Glasgow, Scotland
- Died: 20 January 2017 (aged 83)

Sport
- Sport: Athletics
- Event(s): Middle-distance, cross country
- Club: Shettleston Harriers

Graham Emmerson Everett (20 January 1934 – 20 January 2017) was a track and field athlete from Scotland who competed at the 1958 British Empire and Commonwealth Games (now Commonwealth Games).

== Biography ==
Everett was a member of the Shettleston Harriers Athletic Club and in 1957 won the Shettleston Harriers cross country title.

In February 1958 he was named by the Scottish AAA in the 'possibles list' for the forthcoming Commonwealth and Empire Games and won the mile race at the 1958 Western District Championships. Also in 1958, he became the British mile champion, after winning the title at the 1958 AAA Championships. and won the one mile title at the 1958 Scottish A.A.A. Championships.

He represented the Scottish Empire and Commonwealth Games team at the 1958 British Empire Games in Cardiff, Wales, participating in two events, the 880 yards and the 1 mile race.

Everett lost the 1961 Scottish cross country title being defeating by Joe Connolly but was an eight-times Scottish champion.

He died in 2017 on his 83rd birthday.
