= Athletics at the 1967 Pan American Games – Men's 5000 metres =

Men's 5000 metres at the Pan American Games

The men's 5000 metres event at the 1967 Pan American Games was held in Winnipeg on 2 August.

== Results ==
Rank	Name	Nationality	Time	Notes
1st place, gold medalist(s)	Van Nelson	United States	13:47.4	
2nd place, silver medalist(s)	Lou Scott	United States	13:54.0	
3rd place, bronze medalist(s)	Juan Máximo Martínez	Mexico	13:54.0	
4	Bob Finlay	Canada	14:15.2	
5	Osvaldo Suárez	Argentina	14:19.4	
6	Valentino Robles	Mexico	14:20.2	
7	Mario Cutropia	Argentina	14:30.0	
8	Víctor Mora	Colombia	14:35.4	
9	John Eccleston	Canada	14:51.0	
10	Harry Prowell	Guyana	14:57.2	
11	Joachim Velázquez	Colombia	15:04.4	
	José Esteban Valle	Nicaragua	DNS	
