= Athletics at the 1959 Pan American Games – Men's 1500 metres =

Men's 1500 metres at the Pan American Games

The men's 1500 metres event at the 1959 Pan American Games was held at the Soldier Field in Chicago on 31 August and 2 September.

== Medalists ==
Gold	Silver	Bronze
Dyrol Burleson; United States	Jim Grelle; United States	Ed Moran; United States

== Results ==
=== Heats ===
Rank	Heat	Name	Nationality	Time	Notes
1	1	Randy Mason	Canada	3:58.7	Q
2	1	Ralph Gomes	British Guiana	3:59.8	Q
3	1	José Manuel Luna	Mexico	4:00.3	Q
4	1	Ricardo Vidal	Chile	4:00.7	Q
5	1	Dyrol Burleson	United States	4:02.6	Q
6	1	José Pérez	Mexico	4:10.2	
7	1	François Ducarmel	Haiti	?:??.?	
1	2	David Drybrough	Canada	3:59.6	Q
2	2	Ramón Sandoval	Chile	3:59.8	Q
3	2	Ed Moran	United States	4:00.0	Q
4	2	Jim Grelle	United States	4:02.4	Q
5	2	Alfonso Tinoco	Mexico	4:03.4	Q
6	2	Alejandro Arroyo	Ecuador	4:12.8	
	2	Jossué Delgado	Puerto Rico	DNS	
	2	Sebastião Mendes	Brazil	DNS	

=== Final ===
Rank	Name	Nationality	Time	Notes
1st place, gold medalist(s)	Dyrol Burleson	United States	3:49.1	
2nd place, silver medalist(s)	Jim Grelle	United States	3:49.9	
3rd place, bronze medalist(s)	Ed Moran	United States	3:50.1	
4	Ramón Sandoval	Chile	3:51.9	
5	Randy Mason	Canada	3:54.0	
6	José Manuel Luna	Mexico	3:58.1	
7	Ralph Gomes	British Guiana	4:00.5	
8	Alfonso Tinoco	Mexico	4:01.1	
9	Ricardo Vidal	Chile	?:??.?	
	David Drybrough	Canada	DNF	
