= Don Faircloth =

British athlete

Personal information
- Nationality: British (English)
- Born: 26 November 1948 (age 77) Croydon, England

Sport
- Sport: Athletics
- Event: Marathon
- Club: Croydon Harriers
Medal record
Athletics
Representing England
Commonwealth Games
Bronze medal – third place	1970 Edinburgh	marathon

Donald Kevin Faircloth (born 26 November 1948), is an English former athlete.

== Biography ==
Faircloth, a gardener with Croydon Council, became the British marathon champion after winning the British AAA Championships title at the 1970 AAA Championships on 13 June from Windsor to Chiswick.

Shotly afterwards he represented England in the marathon, at the 1970 British Commonwealth Games in Edinburgh, Scotland, where he won a bronze medal.
