= Colin Shillington =

Northern Irish athlete

Personal information
- Nationality: British (Northern Irish)
- Born: c.1938 Belfast, Northern Ireland
- Died: 2003 Belfast, Northern Ireland

Sport
- Sport: Athletics
- Event: Middle-distance
- Club: Willowfield Harriers

Colin John Graham Shillington (born 1938 – 2003) was an athlete from Northern Ireland, who represented Northern Ireland at the British Empire and Commonwealth Games (now Commonwealth Games).

== Biography ==
Shillington was a member of the Willowfield Harriers Athletic Club. He studied at Trinity College Dublin and at the 1958 Ulster Championships won the half-mile title.

Shillington was named by the Northern Ireland AAA in the final 1958 Northern Irish Team for the forthcoming Empire and Commonwealth Games. He subsequently competed at the 1958 British Empire and Commonwealth Games in Cardiff, Wales, participating in the two athletics events; the 880 yards race, and the 1 mile race.

Shillington continued to impress over middle-distance races and represented the British team. He broke the Northern Irish 880 yards record in June 1960. His father R.E.G. Shillington was a County Inspector and chairman of the RUC Athletic Association.

Later in life, Shillington was president of the Commonwealth Games Council and chairman of the Northern Ireland Sports and Recreation Trust. He died in 2003.
