= Colin Kirkham =

British long-distance runner

Personal information
- Nationality: British (English)
- Born: 30 October 1944 (age 81) Nottingham, England
- Height: 179 cm (5 ft 10 in)
- Weight: 61 kg (134 lb)

Sport
- Sport: Athletics
- Event: Long-distance running/Marathon
- Club: Coventry Godiva Harriers

Colin Kirkham (born 30 October 1944) is a male British retiredlong-distance runner who competed at the 1972 Summer Olympics.

== Biography ==
Kirkham studied Mathematics at Durham University, where he was a member of St Cuthbert's Society and won the Northern Counties Marathon Championship. He taught Maths at Arley, Warwickshire and at Coleshill School, Warwickshire.

Kirkham represented Great Britain in the marathon at the 1972 Olympics in Munich. The following year Kirkham finished third behind Ian Thompson in the marathon event at the 1973 AAA Championships.

He represented England in the marathon event, at the 1974 British Commonwealth Games in Christchurch, New Zealand and would podium on two more occasions at the 1975 AAA Championships and the 1977 AAA Championships. In December 1981 he won the Tiberias Marathon in Israel.
