= ZDK =

Antiguan media company

ZDK is an Antiguan privately owned radio station and media company. Founded by Ivor Bird in the 1960s, the company commenced operations on 30 November 1970. The station's transmitter is located on Boggy Peak. The company is associated with the Bird political family and is considered one of the largest Labour Party-aligned media outlets in the country along with the Pointe Broadcasting Network. The radio station is known for its political broadcasting– in the early years of the Observer Radio station, the companies competed to dominate the political talk niche.
