= Hugh Hyland =

Irish Gaelic footballer and horse breeder (1949–2022)

Personal information
- Native name: Aodh Ó hAoláin (Irish)
- Born: 1949 Dublin, Ireland
- Died: 26 September 2022 (aged 72) Dublin, Ireland
- Occupation: Horse breeder

Sport
- Sport: Gaelic football
- Position: Midfield
Club
- Years: Club
- Monasterevin
Club titles
- Kildare titles: 1
Inter-county
- Years: County
- 1970–1979: Kildare
Inter-county titles
- Leinster titles: 0
- All-Irelands: 0
- NFL: 0
- All Stars: 0

Hugh D. Hyland (1949 – 26 September 2022) was an Irish Gaelic footballer who played for the Monasterevin club and at inter-county level with the Kildare senior football team. He also had a lengthy career as a horse breeder.

== Gaelic football career ==
Hyland first played Gaelic football at juvenile and underage levels with the Monasterevin club. He represented the club's adult teams in the 1970s as they won the Kildare IFC title in 1971 and the SFC title in 1977, as well as Leader Cups in 1973 and 1974.

Hyland's performances at club level earned a call-up to the Kildare senior football team. He made 58 appearances at senior level from 1970 to 1979, at a time when the team had little in the way of success. Hyland captained the team to a defeat by Dublin in the 1978 Leinster final.

== Horse breeding career ==
Hyland and his brother Pat were the fourth generation to run the 300-acre Oghill House Stud in Monasterevin. After transition from farming to full-time horse breeding in the 1980s, the farm gained a reputation as a producer of quality thoroughbreds.

== Death ==
Hyland died at the Mater Private Hospital in Dublin on 26 September 2022, at the age of 72.

== Honours ==
Monasterevin

- Kildare Senior Football Championship: 1977
- Kildare Intermediate Football Championship: 1971

Sporting positions
Preceded by	Kildare senior football team captain 1978	Succeeded by
