= Alan Gordon (athlete) =

Scottish athlete

Personal information
- Nationality: British (Scottish)
- Born: 21 September 1932 Bolsover, England
- Died: 2014

Sport
- Sport: Athletics
- Events: Middle-distance, cross country
- Club: Oxford University AC; Achilles Club; Chesterfield Harriers

Alan Duncan Gordon (21 September 1932 – 2014) was a track and field athlete from Scotland who competed at the 1958 British Empire and Commonwealth Games (now Commonwealth Games).

== Biography ==
Gordon studied at Magdalen College, Oxford and therefore as a member of the University of Oxford AC he was able to compete for the Achilles Club.

He represented the Scottish Empire and Commonwealth Games team at the 1958 British Empire Games in Cardiff, Wales, participating in one event, the 1 mile race.

Gordon competed in the race that saw Roger Bannister famously break the 4-minute mile in 1954. He also competed in cross country and ran for Chesterfield Harriers.
