= Roger Matthews (runner) =

British sprinter (born 1949)

Personal information
- Nationality: British (English)
- Born: c.1942 England

Sport
- Sport: Athletics
- Event: Long-distance
- Club: Bournemouth AC

Roger Matthews (born c.1942) is a former international long distance runner who competed at the Commonwealth Games.

== Biography ==
Matthews was a member of the Bournemouth Athletics Club and specialised in long distances, primarily the 5,000 and 10,000 metres.

A carpenter by profession, he beat Dick Taylor in an England trial race, which earned selection for the England team at the 1970 British Commonwealth Games in Edinburgh, Scotland. He finished fourth, just missing the medal rostrum in the 10,000 metres event, in a race where Dick Taylor took the bronze.
