= Association of Former Students =

Organization

The Association of Former Students
- Formation: 1879
- Type: Alumni association
- Headquarters: College Station, Texas, United States
- Members: 640,000+
- President and CEO: Porter S. Garner III '79
- Vice President and CFO: Ron Spies
- Key people: Kathryn Greenwade, vice president Cecilee Herd, vice president Marty Holmes, vice president Barbara Kasper, vice president
- Website: AggieNetwork.com

The Association of Former Students is the official alumni association of Texas A&M University and operates as a 501 (c)(3) organization. The association recognizes over 640,000 people as part of the Aggie Network and oversees 251 clubs worldwide. Known to Aggies as simply The Association, the group is dedicated to promoting the interests and welfare of Texas A&M University, perpetuating ties of affection and esteem that students formed during their college days, and serving the current student body.

The Association facilitates numerous programs aimed at connecting the worldwide Texas A&M community, such as class reunions, A&M Clubs, the Aggie Ring program, the publication of the Texas Aggie magazine, and 'Find an Aggie' database that is housed on the Association's website, AggieNetwork.com.

== History ==
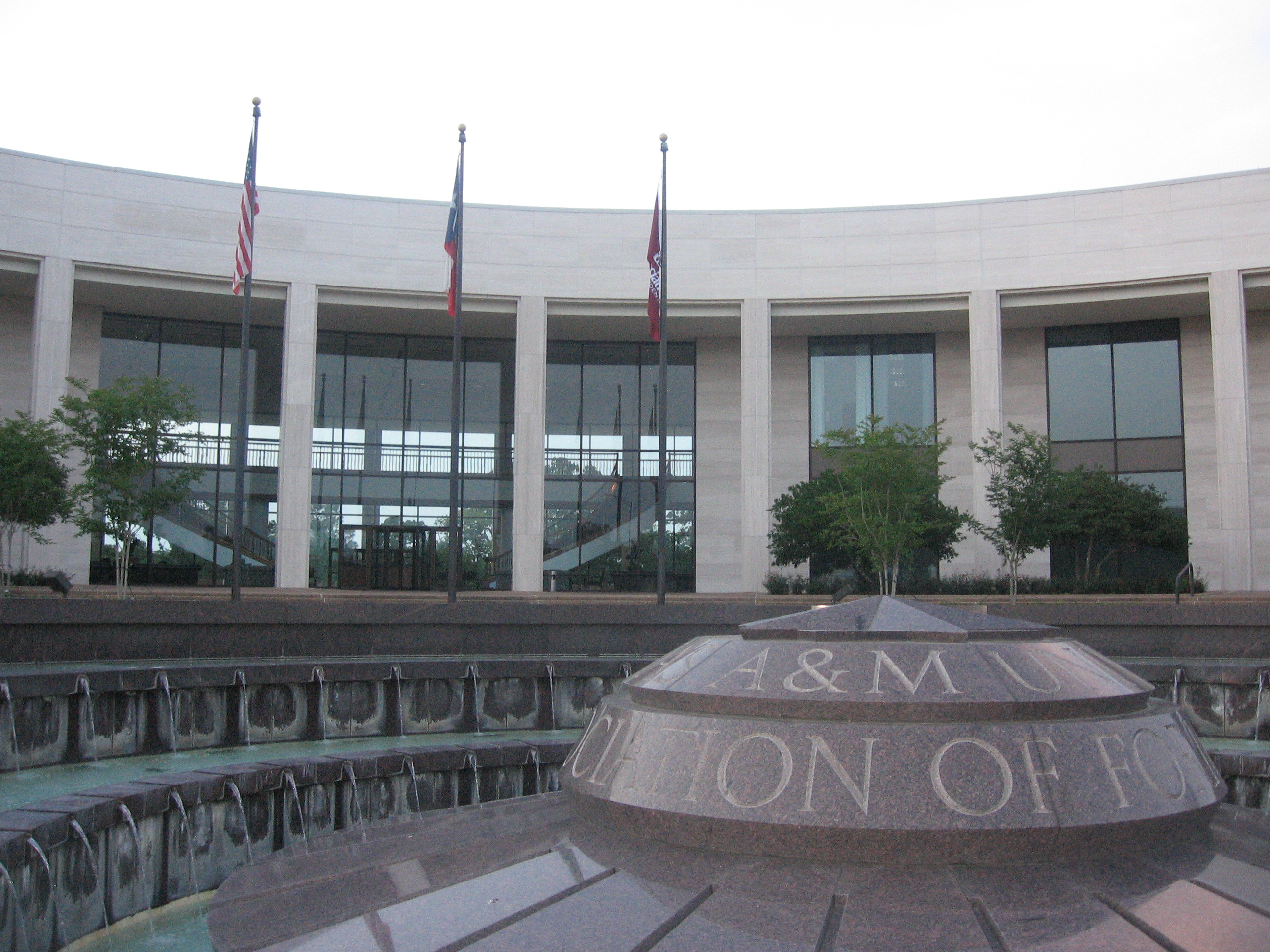
Fountain in front of the former students' building

The Association's roots go back to June 26, 1879, when former cadets hosted a reception in Houston initiating the first formal organization of A&M former students. In 1888, the Ex-Cadets Association was reorganized to form the Alumni Association. In the mid-1890s, E.P. Cushing founded Alpha Phi to "work for the upbuilding of the college." Cushing chose to contact all 3,000 former students of the college, rather than just the 300 students who had received degrees. As a result, the term "former student" is used in lieu of "ex-Aggie" (keeping with tradition that "once an Aggie, always an Aggie").

A coalition was formed between the A&M Alumni Association and Alpha Phi Fraternity in 1919 to form “The Association of Former Students.”

Lacking a permanent location on the A&M campus, the Association created a fundraising campaign to erect a YMCA-Alumni Memorial Building in 1910. Although this building was dedicated on February 15, 1915, the Y never was home to the Association. Instead, the Association gave the building to Texas A&M to provide space for the campus's growth. In 1987, the Association constructed its first free-standing building, the Clayton W. Williams, Jr. Alumni Center, and the long series of temporary locations ended.

== The Clayton W. Williams, Jr. Alumni Center ==
In 2008, the Alumni Center was enhanced to better use the facility as an exhibit of the “powerful story of Texas A&M and Texas Aggies.” The building was rededicated in the fall of 2009. The remodeled building houses six interactive exhibits: Traditions, Spirit, Muster, Memories, Legacy and Network. Each exhibit allows the visitor to experience different aspects of what it is like to be an Aggie.

The Huddleston Video Wall, located in Flores Hall of the Alumni Center, is composed of plasma screens that create a multimedia experience and is perfect for the former students’ football game-watching festivities. The Clayton W. Williams, Jr. Alumni Center is typically open to the public Monday-Friday from 7:30 a.m. to 5:30 p.m. On Saturdays, the building is open from 10:00 a.m. to 2:00 p.m. These hours may be extended due to events held at the Alumni Center or at Texas A&M University. In addition, the Alumni Center features a giant replica of the Aggie Ring, which is modeled after the 1946 Aggie Ring of Bill Haynes '46, who with his wife, Reta, donated the funds to build it. The surrounding area around the Ring replica is called Haynes Ring Plaza. The replica ring is 12 feet tall (symbolizing the honored 12th Man tradition).

== AggieNetwork.com ==
The Association's website, AggieNetwork.com, “connects Aggies with each other and with Texas A&M by providing engaging and inspiring content, essential transactional services and growing interactive capabilities.” AggieNetwork.com is also home to ‘Find an Aggie,’ which allows Aggies all over the world to connect with other Aggies. AggieNetwork.com includes the following services and capabilities: the worldwide Muster Roll; worldwide A&M Club and Class Agent listings and contact information; Aggie Baby Central; career resources and tools; Class and Club Pages with Classmate news, announcements and real-time Silver Taps; contact information for The Association of Former Students; downloadable desktop wallpapers and audio clips of Aggie songs; Aggie events, news, calendars, and pictures; news from and about Texas A&M and the Aggie Network; Muster information; online donation portal for the Association, online Aggie Ring portal, online directory of former students (‘Find an Aggie’); Support Our Troops news postings; The Association's staff and leadership; Traveling Aggies schedule and trip information; web hosting for A&M Clubs, Classes, and Constituent Networks; and a window decal ordering portal.

== Programs and services ==
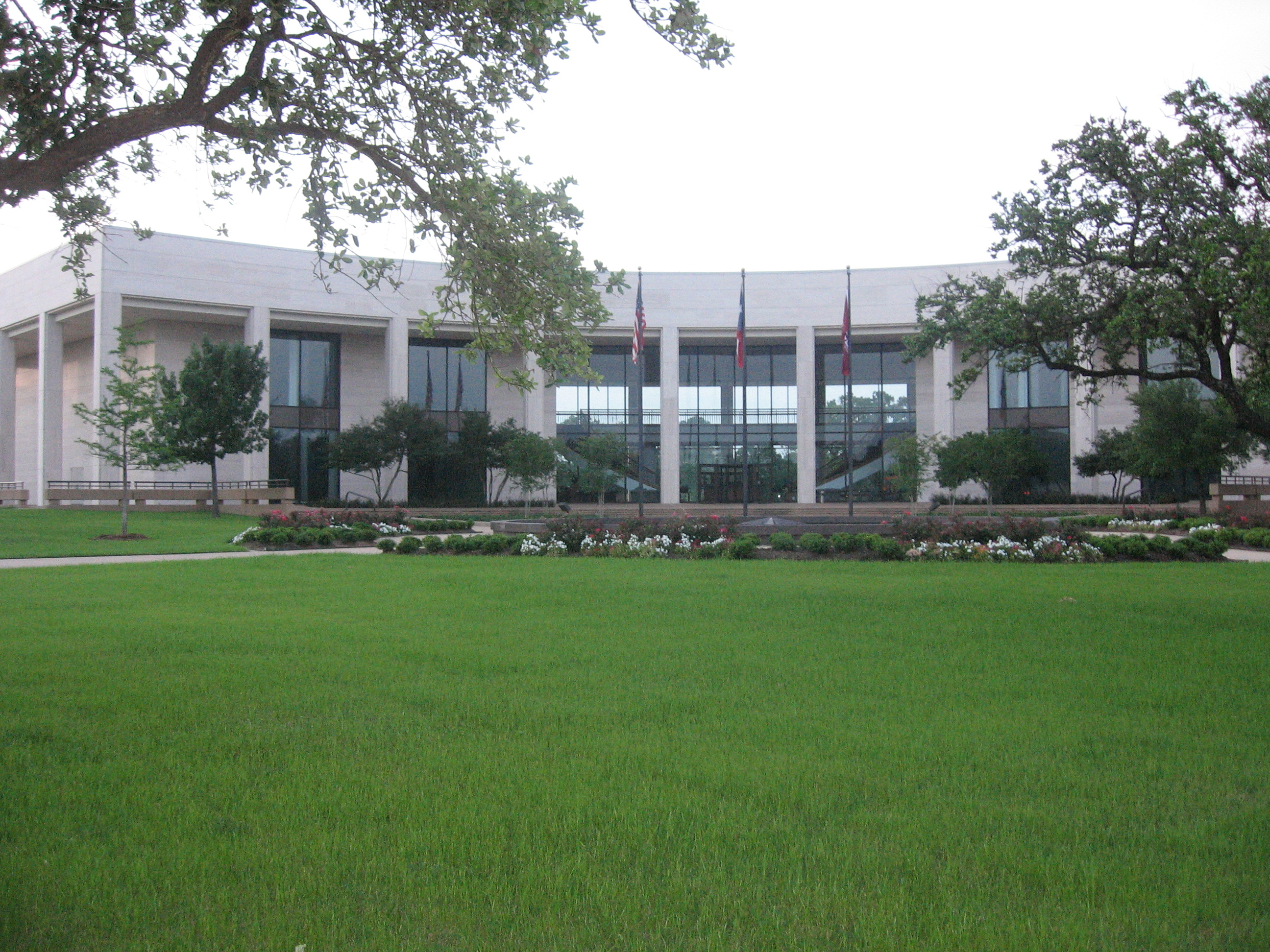
Clayton W. Williams, Jr. Alumni Center in College Station, TX

Through generous donations from former students and friends of the Aggie Network, the Association contributes more than $3 million in direct cash support every year to Texas A&M University. Those funds are, in turn, applied toward scholarships and fellowships, student recruitment and orientation, student success, faculty orientation and success, student affairs, various awards, and many other key initiatives. In 2012, the association provided a total impact of $7.2 million to Texas A&M to be used for scholarships, awards, activities, and enrichment for students, faculty and staff, and former students. Half of the money was given back to Texas A&M in cash support to fund over 100 individual projects in impact areas that had been identified by the Texas A&M University president and provost. Additionally, academic colleges and administrative divisions received some funding. Each year, the association's board of directors review the funding requests for approval.

Entering freshmen are first exposed to the Association and its programs the week before school begins. During the university-wide "Howdy Week", the association hosts "GatheRing", which includes a free cookout, a Yell Practice, and a chance to try on the Class's Aggie Ring on the grounds of the Clayton W. Williams, Jr. Alumni Center. Students make the official transition into former students at the Association's "The Next Tradition," a free event that celebrates graduation and welcomes graduates into the Aggie Network, and where Association members explain the services they offer to former students.

The Association offers many programs for Texas A&M alumni, including career services, Aggie football game day festivities, and the 'Traveling Aggies,' a travel program that allows alumni to travel to various destinations around the world. The association publishes Class Newsletters and sponsors Class Reunions and Constituent Network events. Most classes meet every five years, although a single reunion is held each year for the Sul Ross Group, all classes which graduated 55 or more years ago. The Association assists in coordination with over 250 local A&M club chapters. The Association maintains the database of A&M former students, which is accessible free of charge online after an account has been created.

The Clayton W. Williams, Jr. Alumni Center provides for prospective students, current students, former students, and friends of the Aggie Network. The events that the Association sponsors, and often hosts, include: Aggie Ring Day, Association activities during bowl games, Board and Leadership Council meetings, Class Reunions, Coach's Nights, Distinguished Alumni Gala, Endowed Century Club lunch, game day activities, Gig ’em Week GatheRing, Outstanding International Alumnus Award Dinner, Ring Remembrance ceremonies, The Next Tradition, Aggie Greek Weekend, and Traveling Aggies Reunions.

All active donors of The Association of Former Students receive the Texas Aggie magazine, which is published 6 times per year. As of 2007, it has a circulation of 60,000 per year. The Texas Aggie provides an in-depth look at Texas A&M and the lives of those affiliated with it through feature stories and campus updates.

In an effort to capture the history of Texas A&M, the Association has also videotaped numerous former students sharing their experiences with each other as well as with students. Additional recordings of oral histories are incorporated into the 2008 enhancements to the Clayton W. Williams, Jr. Alumni Center.

== Awards ==
Each year, the Association and Texas A&M recognize various former students for their accomplishments since graduation. The highest award given each year is the Distinguished Alumnus Award. This recognition was first offered in 1962, and, as of 2012, 216 former students have received this prestigious award. The criteria for receiving the award include "excellence in professional lives and service to A&M and their communities". Since 1955, the Association has awarded annual Distinguished Achievement Awards, both on the college and university levels, to faculty and staff of the Texas A&M University System. The college level award recognizes "outstanding faculty members for their talent and expertise, dedication to teaching and devotion to imparting their knowledge to students. The university level award recognizes "outstanding member of Texas A&M's faculty and staff for their commitment, performance and positive impact on Aggie students, Texas citizens and the world around them.

Texas A&M also recognizes the "Aggie 100", a reference to the top one hundred companies owned or managed by its alumni.

Beginning in 1973, the Association has recognized current students for academic achievement with the Gathright Award. Named for Texas A&M's first president, Thomas S. Gathright, the award recognizes sophomores, juniors, and seniors who have the highest grade point average in their college. Students are nominated for the award by the dean of their respective college. Recipients are recognized at the annual Parents' Weekend All-University Awards Ceremony.

The Association also gives the Buck Weirus Spirit Award to students who "display vision, character and superior dedication to Texas A&M." The award is given annually to up to 55 students. They must be highly involved in the Aggie community, and must "impact student life at Texas A&M and enhance the Aggie Spirit." This can be accomplished through participation in student organizations, Aggie traditions, and university events. The award is named for Richard "Buck" Weirus, a 1942 Texas A&M graduate who served as executive director of the Association from 1964 until 1980.

Also, the Association, along with Texas A&M's Office of the president, recognizes 20 outstanding A&M employees and outstanding team for their meritorious service to the university through the president's Meritorious Service Award.

== Traditions ==
The Association plays a large role in two of the most treasured traditions at Texas A&M: the dispersal of the Aggie Ring, and the annual Aggie Muster. The Association also supports many other Aggie traditions; for example, it secures a location for and sets up Midnight Yell Practice and a free tailgate at away football games, and for home games, the Association helps pay security costs for Midnight Yell in Kyle Field.

=== Muster ===
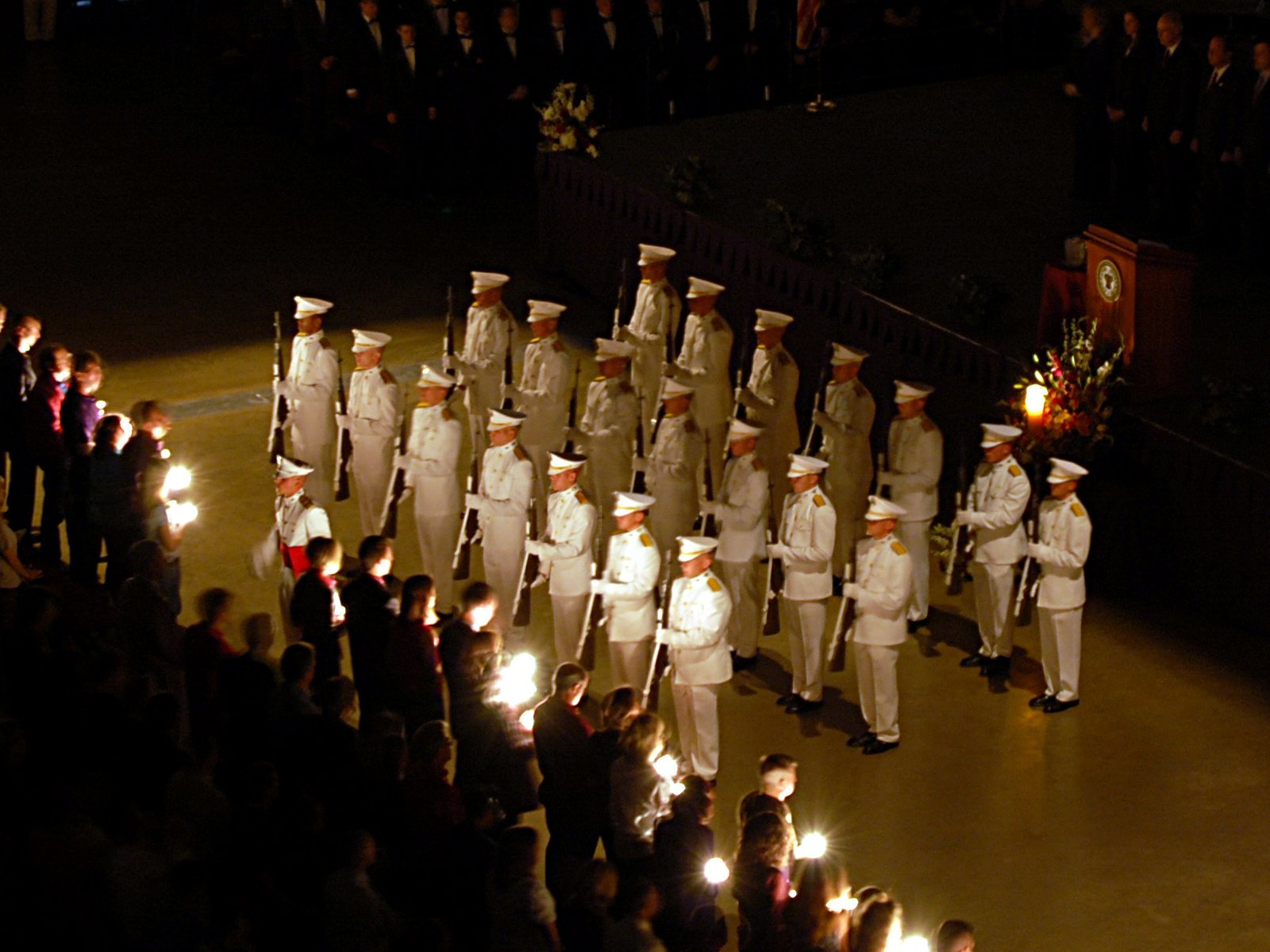
2007 Aggie Muster at Reed Arena. The Ross Volunteers stand at attention as candles are lit for the deceased.

The roots of Aggie Muster go back to 1883. The Association of Former Students supports more than 300 Musters held worldwide on and around April 21. The purposes of Muster are for former students to gather in fellowship and to remember comrades who have died since the last Muster. The Association maintains the annual worldwide Muster Roll; names are added whenever the Association is informed of an Aggie's passing. Each Muster primarily calls the names of Aggies who lived in that area; this is also true for the student-run Muster in Reed Arena, which calls primarily the names of students, faculty and staff. The Association supplies names to local Musters, maintains a bureau of Muster speakers and provides information and planning packets, as well as mailing thousands of local Muster invitations.

=== Aggie Ring ===
The Association's Aggie Ring Office helps qualified current and former students order their Aggie Rings, one of Texas A&M's most well-known and easily recognized symbols. Students earn the Aggie Ring based on credit hours completed at Texas A&M. Many students receive their Aggie Ring on Aggie Ring Days held at the Clayton W. Williams, Jr. Alumni Center.

The Association also assists in lifelong service, repair, resizing and replacement of Aggie Rings, and maintains a "Lost and Found" Ring page on AggieNetwork.com.

The Association maintains three Aggie Ring collections. The first collection contains Rings awarded to graduates of the Agricultural and Mechanical College of Texas, as Texas A&M was previously known. Begun by J. B. "Josh" Sterns, this collection contains Rings from 1899 until 1964, when the name of the school was officially changed. The second collection, the Memorial Ring Collection, contains Rings representing graduating classes beginning with the class of 1965. The Rings in the Memorial Ring Collection are donated by the families of deceased students. The final collection contains historically significant Rings, including that of James Earl Rudder, Texas A&M's president from 1959 until 1970.

== See also ==
- List of Notable Alumni at Texas A&M University
