= Coventry Godiva Harriers =

English athletics club

- Founded: 1879
- Ground: Coventry Athletics Track
- Location: Kirby Corner Rd, Coventry CV4 7AL, England
- Coordinates: 52°23′16″N 1°33′57″W
- Website: coventry-godiva-harriers.co.uk

Coventry Godiva Harriers (CGH) is an athletics club based in Coventry, West Midlands, England. The club name refers to the notable Lady Godiva of Coventry and the sport of "hare and hounds" cross country running. The club uses the University of Warwick athletics track.

== History ==
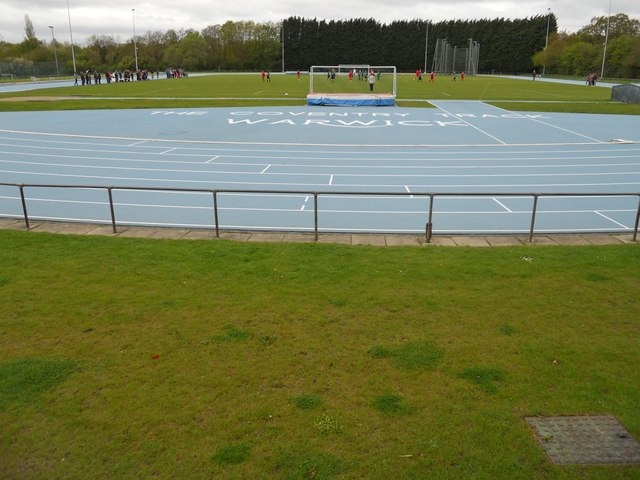
The athletics track in 2013

The club was established in 1879. The first Olympian was Charlie Davenport but he did not start the marathon.

During the 1960s the club produced three Olympic marathon runners Basil Heatley, Brian Kilby and Bill Adcocks.

In 1978 David Moorcroft won Commonwealth Games gold and he repeated the feat four years later.

More recently the club has had several athletes compete in World Masters Athletics competitions, notable sprinters Brian Darby and Stewart Marshall have both won World Relay Titles representing GB as Masters athletes, at the recent World Masters Athletics Championships.

== Olympians ==
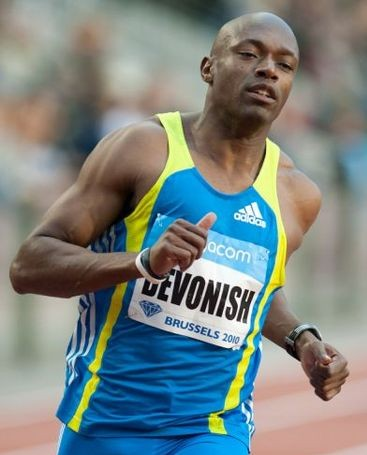
Marlon Devonish

Athlete	Events	Olympics	Positions
Charlie Davenport	marathon	1912	
Stan Ashby	1500 metres	1928	
Paddy Mulvihill	marathon	1948	
Joe West	marathon	1952	
Basil Heatley	marathon	1964	Silver medal
Brian Kilby	marathon	1964	
John Edgington	20 km walk	1964	
Bill Adcocks	marathon	1968	
Sheila Taylor-Carey	800 metres, 1500 metres	1968, 1972	
Dick Taylor	5,000 metres	1968	
Colin Kirkham	marathon	1972	
Dave Moorcroft	1500 metres, 5000 metres	1976, 1980, 1984	
Ian Richards	50 km walk	1980	
Lorraine Baker	800 metres	1984, 1992	
Andy Penn	20 km walk	1992	
Joanne Wise	long jump	1992, 2000	
Andy Hart	800 metres	2000	
Marlon Devonish	200 metres, 4x100 relay	2000, 2004, 2008	Gold medal

== Competitions ==
The club currently competes in various league competitions, ranging from the senior age group down to under 11s. These leagues and the club's most recent 2018/19 performance are listed below:

League Name	Division	Age Group	2018/2019 Rank	Notes
Midland Track & Field League	2	Senior	2nd of 6 (Div 3)	Promoted to Division 2 - August 2018
Birmingham & District Invitational Cross Country League	1	Senior Men	6th of 16	
Midland Women's Cross Country League	2	Senior Women	22nd of 29	
Youth Development League (Midland) Upper Age Group	North / East 1A	U20 & U17	1st of 6	DNS North / East Promotion Match
Youth Development League (Midland) Lower Age Group	North / East 1A	U15 & U13	6th of 6 (Premier)	Relegated from Premier North / East
Heart of England League	1	U17, U15, U13, U11 (n/s)	3rd of 8	
Midland Veterans Track & Field League	N/A	Veteran	N/A	Withdrew after 2017 season
