= Michael Blagrove =

British middle-distance runner

Personal information
- Nationality: British (English)
- Born: 14 March 1934 Brentford, England
- Died: 18 May 2016 (aged 82) Aylesbury, England

Sport
- Sport: Athletics
- Event: middle-distance
- Club: Ealing Harriers

Michael Thomas Blagrove (14 March 1934 – 18 May 2016), was a male athlete who competed for England.

== Biography ==
Blagrove was a member of the Ealing Harriers and earned his place at the Commonwealth Games by winning two important meetings in one week, the 880 yards event at the Leyton floodlit meeting and the 1,500 metres at the Gordon Stewart Trophy meeting.

He represented the England athletics team in the 1 mile race at the 1958 British Empire and Commonwealth Games in Cardiff, Wales.
