= Douglas Zinkala =

Zambian long-distance runner

Personal information
- Nationality: Zambian
- Born: 15 July 1944 (age 82)

Sport
- Sport: Long-distance running
- Event: Marathon

Douglas Zinkala (born 15 July 1944) is a Zambian long-distance runner. He competed in the marathon at the 1968 Summer Olympics.
