= Robert Hackman =

Ghanaian athlete

Personal information
- Nationality: Ghanaian
- Citizenship: United States
- Born: 1 January 1941
- Died: 23 March 2018 (aged 77) Newark, New Jersey, USA

Sport
- Sport: Athletics - Steeplechase

Robert Hackman (1 January 1941 – 23 March 2018) was a former Ghanaian male athlete. He represented Ghana in the 3000 metres steeplechase at the 1972 Summer Olympics.
