= Bill Adcocks =

British long-distance runner

Personal information
- Nationality: British (English)
- Born: 11 November 1941 (age 84) Coventry, England
- Height: 168 cm (5 ft 6 in)
- Weight: 55 kg (121 lb)

Sport
- Sport: Athletics
- Event: long distance
- Club: Coventry Godiva Harriers
Medal record
Athletics
Representing England
British Empire & Commonwealth Games
Silver medal – second place	1966 Kingston	marathon

William Arthur Adcocks (born 11 November 1941) is a British former long-distance runner who competed in the 1968 Summer Olympics.

== Biography ==
He was introduced to athletics at his primary and secondary schools – at secondary school he competed in both cross-country and track and field. He started at school at the age of 12.

He works as an information officer for UK Athletics.

He wrote a book about his marathon performance in Greece in a book titled "The Road to Athens". (ISBN 0954789601) He was invited to start the Athens Classic Marathon in 2002.

== Athletics career ==
He joined the Coventry Godiva Harriers at the age of fourteen.

In 1964, he ran his first marathon, in Port Talbot, finishing second in a time of 2:19:29.

In 1965, he won the Amateur Athletic Association of England title in the marathon, held in Port Talbot, beating nearest rival Brian Kilby by over 40 seconds.

In 1966, he represented England and won silver medal in the Commonwealth Games marathon, finishing 5 seconds behind Scotland's Jim Alder.

In 1968, he competed in the marathon at the Olympics, finishing in fifth. He also medalled for a second and final time at the AAA Marathon Championships in Cwmbran, losing out on the title by 15 seconds. Later that year he ran his personal best for the marathon distance while winning at the Fukuoka Marathon, running 2:10:48, a time which was just a minute outside the world record (which had been set on the same course a year previously) at the time, and was a new European record. He is the only Briton to have won the Fukuoka Marathon.

In 1969, he ran in the Athens Classic Marathon, which is run over the same course as the original marathon run by Pheidippides. He set a course record, clocking 2:11:07, which was not broken until 2004, when Stefano Baldini broke the record. He also raced in the CAU (Counties Athletics Union) 20 Miles Championships, winning the title.

In 1970, he won the Midland Counties 10,000 metres title. He also won the Lake Biwa Marathon that year, setting a new course record in 2:13:46. He represented England in the marathon, at the 1970 British Commonwealth Games in Edinburgh, Scotland.

In 1972, he won the CAU 20 Miles Championships again, running 1:39:01, setting a British record. He currently holds the 20 miles British National, British Domestic and British All-Comers record for times set during a race over that distance, although faster intermediate marks have been set in races over longer distances.

Adcocks ran 10 marathons under 2:20. In 17 total marathons, he won 5 times and placed second 5 times.
