= British West Indies Championships =

The British West Indies Championships was an annual track and field competition between nations involved in the West Indies Federation and several other Caribbean nations with a British colonial history. Like the federation itself, the competition was short-lived: first held in 1957, it ceased after 1965. The competition was created at a time of much sporting co-operation within the region – a British West Indies team was sent to both the 1959 Pan American Games and the 1960 Summer Olympics.

The first event in 1957, held in Kingston, Jamaica, was supported by retired Olympic sprint medallist Herb McKenley. The national championships of the host nation was sometimes replaced by the regional championships.

The championships featured prominent Caribbean men's sprinters of the period, including Commonwealth champion Tom Robinson, and Jamaican Olympic medallists Lennox Miller, George Kerr and Malcolm Spence. Other prominent champions of this event were hurdler Keith Gardner and high jumper Ernle Haisley (both Commonwealth champions). Women were not invited to the first two editions of the competition, but a women's programme was introduced from 1959 onwards.

== Editions ==
Ed.	Year	City	Country	Dates	No. of events	No. of nations	No. of athletes	Winning nation
1st	1957	Kingston	Jamaica		18			Jamaica
2nd	1958	Port of Spain	Trinidad and Tobago		18			Trinidad and Tobago
3rd	1959	Georgetown	British Guiana		27			British Guiana
4th	1960	Kingston	Jamaica		31			Jamaica
5th	1964	Kingston	Jamaica		25			Jamaica
6th	1965	Bridgetown	Barbados		28			Jamaica

== Participating nations ==
- Antigua and Barbuda
- Barbados
- Bahamas
- British Guiana
- British Honduras
- Dominica
- Grenada
- Jamaica
- Montserrat
- Saint Kitts and Nevis
- Saint Lucia
- Saint Vincent and the Grenadines
- Trinidad and Tobago
