= Harnek Singh =

Indian athlete

Harnek Singh was an Indian athlete. He is known as Subedar Harnek Singh Brar. He used to live in Kot Sukhia Village Faridkot, Punjab, India. (all unverified)

== Early life ==
He served in the Indian Army. (unverified)

== Career ==
He joined Athletics in the Army and won a gold medal in Edenberg and medals in England, Scotland, Germany, Singapore, Hong Kong and in Thailand. After winning the Gold Medal he earned Arjuna Award in 1969.

== Birth and Death ==
Born in 1935, died in 2025. (unverified)
