= Andy Boychuk =

Canadian long-distance runner

Personal information
- Full name: Andrew Harry Boychuk
- Born: May 17, 1941 (age 85) Orono, Ontario, Canada
- Height: 177 cm (5 ft 10 in)
- Weight: 68 kg (150 lb)
Medal record
Men's athletics
Representing Canada
Pan American Games
Gold medal – first place	1967 Winnipeg	Marathon

Andrew Harry Boychuk (born May 17, 1941) is a retired long-distance runner.

Boychuk represented Canada at the 1968 Summer Olympics in the men's marathon. There he finished in tenth place. He won the gold medal in the men's marathon at the 1967 Pan American Games.

== See also ==
- 1975 Boston Marathon
