= Dave Ellis (runner) =

Canadian long-distance runner (1937–2026)

Personal information
- Full name: David John Ellis
- Born: 25 April 1937 Louth, Lincolnshire, England
- Died: 8 February 2026 (aged 88) Canada

Sport
- Sport: Long-distance running
- Event: 5000 mi.

David John Ellis (25 April 1937 – 7 February 2026) was a Canadian long-distance runner. He competed in the men's 5000 metres at the 1968 Summer Olympics. Ellis died on 7 February 2026, at the age of 88.
